= 1968–69 Dundee F.C. season =

Dundee
1968–69 season
- Manager: Bobby Ancell (until Oct. 1968); John Prentice (from Oct. 1968)
- Division One: 9th
- Scottish Cup: 1st round
- League Cup: Semi-finals
- Top goalscorer: League: Jocky Scott (10); All: Jocky Scott (17)
Home colours

The 1968–69 season was the 67th season in which Dundee competed at a Scottish national level, playing in Division One, where the club would finish in 9th place for the 2nd consecutive season. Domestically, Dundee would also compete in both the Scottish League Cup and the Scottish Cup, where they would reach the League Cup semi-finals before being defeated by Hibernian, and by Heart of Midlothian in the 1st round of the Scottish Cup.

Dundee would change their shirt style for the first time in over a decade, replacing their iconic v-neck shirt with a newer jersey.

== Scottish Division One ==
Statistics provided by Dee Archive.

Match day	Date	Opponent	H/A	Score	Dundee scorer(s)	Attendance
1	7 September	Aberdeen	H	4–4	Scott, Campbell, B. Wilson, Duncan	10,000
2	14 September	Dundee United	A	1–3	Georgeson	13,942
3	21 September	St Johnstone	H	2–3	Scott, Duncan	8,000
4	28 September	Airdrieonians	A	3–0	Campbell, Scott, Black (o.g.)	3,000
5	5 October	Clyde	H	2–3	Duncan, Bryce	7,000
6	12 October	St Mirren	H	0–0		5,000
7	19 October	Arbroath	A	2–1	McLean, Gilroy	5,307
8	26 October	Heart of Midlothian	H	3–1	Gilroy, Campbell, Kinninmonth	9,025
9	2 November	Celtic	A	1–3	Campbell	34,875
10	9 November	Dunfermline Athletic	H	1–0	Gilroy	7,500
11	16 November	Falkirk	A	1–0	Campbell	4,000
12	23 November	Kilmarnock	A	0–1		6,594
13	30 November	Partick Thistle	H	1–1	Scott	6,000
14	7 December	Greenock Morton	A	1–2	Gilroy	4,500
15	14 December	Hibernian	H	0–0		7,137
16	1 January	Aberdeen	A	0–0		12,000
17	2 January	Dundee United	H	1–2	Bryce	19,549
18	4 January	St Johnstone	A	1–3	Kinninmonth	8,000
19	11 January	Airdrieonians	H	1–1	McLean	5,000
20	18 January	Clyde	A	0–0		3,000
21	1 February	St Mirren	A	3–2	Gilroy, Bryce, Stewart	6,000
22	8 February	Arbroath	H	3–0	Campbell, Bryce, Scott (pen.)	5,000
23	5 March	Dunfermline Athletic	A	0–2		6,000
24	8 March	Falkirk	H	0–0		4,484
25	12 March	Heart of Midlothian	A	2–2	Kinninmonth, Scott	5,141
26	15 March	Kilmarnock	H	0–0		5,000
27	22 March	Partick Thistle	A	4–0	Scott (2), Kinninmonth, Bryce	2,500
28	26 March	Raith Rovers	H	2–2	Bryce, Duncan	6,000
29	29 March	Greenock Morton	H	0–2		3,983
30	8 April	Hibernian	A	3–1	Kinninmonth, Scott (2)	5,000
31	19 April	Raith Rovers	A	0–4		5,000
32	22 April	Rangers	H	3–2	Bryce (2), Gilroy	9,000
33	28 April	Rangers	A	1–1	Steele	6,800
34	30 April	Celtic	H	1–2	Murray	10,959

=== League table ===
Pos	Team	Pld	W	D	L	GF	GA	GD	Pts
7	Airdrieonians	34	13	11	10	46	44	+2	37
8	Heart of Midlothian	34	14	8	12	52	54	−2	36
9	Dundee	34	10	12	12	47	48	−1	32
10	Morton	34	12	8	14	58	68	−10	32
11	St Mirren	34	11	10	13	40	54	−14	32

Source: "1968-1969 First Division - SPFL Archive". SPFL.

== Scottish League Cup ==
Statistics provided by Dee Archive.

=== Group 2 ===
Match day	Date	Opponent	H/A	Score	Dundee scorer(s)	Attendance
1	10 August	Kilmarnock	H	4–0	Scott (2), Duncan, Stuart	8,500
2	14 August	Heart of Midlothian	A	1–2	Stuart	9,526
3	17 August	Airdrieonians	H	1–1	McLean	7,000
4	24 August	Kilmarnock	A	2–2	McLean, Stewart	6,000
5	28 August	Heart of Midlothian	H	4–0	Duncan (3), McLean	7,715
6	31 August	Airdrieonians	A	3–0	McLean (2), Duncan	6,000

==== Group 2 table ====
Team	Pld	W	D	L	GF	GA	GR	Pts
Dundee	6	3	2	1	15	5	3.000	8
Airdrieonians	6	3	1	2	10	7	1.429	7
Heart of Midlothian	6	2	2	2	8	12	0.667	6
Kilmarnock	6	0	3	3	5	14	0.357	3

=== Knockout stage ===
Match day	Date	Opponent	H/A	Score	Dundee scorer(s)	Attendance
Quarter-finals, 1st leg	11 September	Stranraer	A	4–0	Duncan (2), Scott, Georgeson	4,000
Quarter-finals, 2nd leg	18 September	Stranraer	H	6–0	Scott (3), McLean (3)	3,000
Dundee won 10–0 on aggregate
Semi-finals	9 October	Hibernian	N	1–2	McLean	19,572

== Scottish Cup ==
Statistics provided by Dee Archive.

Match day	Date	Opponent	H/A	Score	Dundee scorer(s)	Attendance
1st round	25 January	Heart of Midlothian	H	1–2	Scott	14,000

== Player statistics ==
Statistics provided by Dee Archive

No.	Pos	Nat	Player	Total		Division One		Scottish Cup		League Cup	
No.	Pos	Nat	Player	Apps	Goals	Apps	Goals	Apps	Goals	Apps	Goals
	GK	(Scotland) SCO	John Arrol	1	0	1	0	0	0	0	0
	MF	(Scotland) SCO	Alex Bryce	29	8	24+2	8	1	0	2	0
	FW	(Northern Ireland) NIR	Billy Campbell	39	6	28+1	6	1	0	9	0
	DF	(Scotland) SCO	Bobby Cox	2	0	0	0	0	0	2	0
	GK	(Scotland) SCO	Ally Donaldson	43	0	33	0	1	0	9	0
	FW	(Scotland) SCO	John Duncan	19	11	11	4	0	0	7+1	7
	MF	(Scotland) SCO	Jim Easton	29	0	21	0	0	0	8	0
	FW	(United Arab Republic) UAR	Roddy Georgeson	9	2	4	1	0	0	4+1	1
	FW	(Scotland) SCO	Joe Gilroy	25	6	24	6	1	0	0	0
	MF	(Scotland) SCO	Doug Houston	42	0	32	0	1	0	9	0
	DF	(Scotland) SCO	Davie Johnston	4	0	4	0	0	0	0	0
	FW	(Scotland) SCO	Alex Kinninmonth	23	5	20+2	5	0	0	1	0
	FW	(Scotland) SCO	Derek McKay	2	0	1	0	0	0	1	0
	FW	(Scotland) SCO	George McLean	31	11	20+2	2	1	0	8	9
	FW	(Scotland) SCO	Steve Murray	40	1	31	1	1	0	8	0
	FW	(Scotland) SCO	Jocky Scott	43	17	32+1	10	1	1	9	6
	DF	(Scotland) SCO	Ron Selway	5	0	4+1	0	0	0	0	0
	DF	(Scotland) SCO	Jim Steele	5	1	3+1	1	0	0	1	0
	DF	(Scotland) SCO	George Stewart	34	2	24	1	1	0	9	1
	DF	(Scotland) SCO	Alex Stuart	9	2	5	0	0	0	4	2
	DF	(Scotland) SCO	Davie Swan	19	0	18	0	1	0	0	0
	DF	(Scotland) SCO	Bobby Wilson	42	1	34	1	1	0	7	0
	FW	(Northern Ireland) NIR	Sammy Wilson	3	0	0+2	0	0	0	1	0

== See also ==
- List of Dundee F.C. seasons
