= 1967–68 Dundee F.C. season =

Dundee
1967–68 season
- Manager: Bobby Ancell
- Division One: 9th
- Scottish Cup: 2nd round
- League Cup: Finalists
- Inter-Cities Fairs Cup: Semi-finals
- Top goalscorer: League: George McLean (23); All: George McLean (35)
Home colours

The 1967–68 season was the 66th season in which Dundee competed at a Scottish national level, playing in Division One, where the club would finish in 9th place. Domestically, Dundee would also compete in both the Scottish League Cup and the Scottish Cup, where they would reach the League Cup Final before being defeated by Celtic, and by Rangers in a 2nd round replay in the Scottish Cup. Dundee would also compete in the Inter-Cities Fairs Cup, the precursor to the UEFA Cup and currently the UEFA Europa League, where they would reach the semi-finals before being defeated by eventual champions, Don Revie's Leeds United.

== Scottish Division One ==
Statistics provided by Dee Archive.

Match day	Date	Opponent	H/A	Score	Dundee scorer(s)	Attendance
1	9 September	Aberdeen	A	2–4	Campbell, Stuart	15,000
2	16 September	Dundee United	H	2–2	J. McLean, Scott	13,186
3	23 September	Heart of Midlothian	A	0–1		9,404
4	30 September	Motherwell	H	2–1	G. McLean (2)	7,000
5	7 October	Kilmarnock	H	0–0		5,000
6	14 October	St Johnstone	H	1–4	J. McLean	8,000
7	23 October	Rangers	A	0–2		26,016
8	4 November	Airdrieonians	A	0–0		3,000
9	8 November	Stirling Albion	H	4–2	Bryce, J. McLean, S. Wilson, B. Wilson	4,000
10	11 November	Hibernian	H	1–4	G. McLean	7,070
11	18 November	Dunfermline Athletic	H	4–0	G. McLean (2), J. McLean, S. Wilson	8,000
12	25 November	Clyde	A	0–1		2,500
13	2 December	Partick Thistle	H	3–4	J. McLean, G. McLean, S. Wilson	8,000
14	9 December	Greenock Morton	A	0–0		7,000
15	16 December	Celtic	H	4–5	G. McLean, Scott, Campbell, S. Wilson	17,801
16	23 December	Raith Rovers	H	4–0	G. McLean, J. McLean, Houston, Campbell	5,000
17	30 December	Falkirk	A	2–0	Stuart, J. McLean	4,000
18	1 January	Aberdeen	H	0–2		10,000
19	2 January	Dundee United	A	0–0		14,014
20	20 January	Kilmarnock	H	6–5	G. McLean (2), Campbell (2), Bryce, Stuart	4,500
21	3 February	St Johnstone	A	2–0	Campbell, Stuart	5,000
22	10 February	Rangers	H	2–4	Scott (2)	21,439
23	2 March	Airdrieonians	H	6–2	G. McLean (3), S. Wilson (2), Scott	8,000
24	6 March	Stirling Albion	A	3–0	G. McLean (2), Campbell	600
25	9 March	Hibernian	A	0–2		8,467
26	13 March	Motherwell	A	4–2	G. McLean (2), Campbell (2)	2,600
27	16 March	Dunfermline Athletic	A	0–2		5,000
28	23 March	Clyde	H	3–0	G. McLean (3)	8,000
29	30 March	Partick Thistle	A	1–1	J. McLean	3,000
30	13 April	Celtic	A	2–5	Scott, G. McLean	37,474
31	15 April	Heart of Midlothian	H	1–0	G. McLean	4,757
32	20 April	Raith Rovers	A	2–0	G. McLean, Georgeson	4,485
33	24 April	Greenock Morton	H	0–3		6,000
34	27 April	Falkirk	H	1–1	J. McLean	3,500

=== League table ===
Pos	Team	Pld	W	D	L	GF	GA	GD	Pts
7	Kilmarnock	34	13	8	13	59	57	+2	34
8	Clyde	34	15	4	15	55	55	0	34
9	Dundee	34	13	7	14	62	59	+3	33
10	Partick Thistle	34	12	7	15	51	67	−16	31
11	Dundee United	34	10	11	13	53	72	−19	31

Source: "1967-1968 First Division - SPFL Archive". SPFL.

== Scottish League Cup ==
Statistics provided by Dee Archive.

=== Group 3 ===
Match day	Date	Opponent	H/A	Score	Dundee scorer(s)	Attendance
1	12 August	Hibernian	H	0–0		12,681
2	16 August	Clyde	A	2–1	J. McLean, S. Wilson	2,000
3	19 August	Motherwell	H	2–1	G. McLean, Campbell	10,000
4	26 August	Hibernian	A	4–2	G. McLean (2), J. McLean, S. Wilson	13,317
5	30 August	Clyde	H	1–0	S. Wilson	10,000
6	2 September	Motherwell	A	5–2	J. McLean (2), Scott, Campbell, G. McLean	3,000

==== Group 3 table ====
Team	Pld	W	D	L	GF	GA	GR	Pts
Dundee	6	5	1	0	14	6	2.333	11
Hibernian	6	3	1	2	9	7	1.286	7
Motherwell	6	1	1	4	8	13	0.615	3
Clyde	6	1	1	4	6	11	0.545	3

=== Knockout stage ===
Match day	Date	Opponent	H/A	Score	Dundee scorer(s)	Attendance
Quarter-finals, 1st leg	13 September	East Fife	A	1–0	Murray	8,553
Quarter-finals, 2nd leg	20 September	East Fife	H	4–0	J. McLean, G. McLean, Scott, Stuart	9,000
Dundee won 5–0 on aggregate
Semi-finals	11 October	St Johnstone	N	3–1	Miller (2x o.g.), J. McLean (pen.)	18,000
Final	28 October	Celtic	N	3–5	G. McLean (2), J. McLean	66,660

== Scottish Cup ==
Statistics provided by Dee Archive.

Match day	Date	Opponent	H/A	Score	Dundee scorer(s)	Attendance
1st round	27 January	Cowdenbeath	A	1–0	Kinninmonth	5,633
2nd round	17 February	Rangers	H	1–1	Campbell	33,000
2R replay	4 March	Rangers	A	1–4 (A.E.T.)	S. Wilson	53,875

== Inter-Cities Fairs Cup ==
Statistics provided by Dee Archive.

Match day	Date	Opponent	H/A	Score	Dundee scorer(s)	Attendance
1st round, 1st leg	27 September	(Netherlands) DWS Amsterdam	A	1–2	G. McLean	12,000
1st round, 2nd leg	4 October	(Netherlands) DWS Amsterdam	H	3–0	S. Wilson, J. McLean (2)	15,000
Dundee won 4–2 on aggregate
2nd round, 1st leg	1 November	(Belgium) RFC Liégeois	H	3–1	Stuart (2), S. Wilson	12,000
2nd round, 2nd leg	14 November	(Belgium) RFC Liégeois	A	4–1	G. McLean (4)	12,000
Dundee won 7–2 on aggregate
Dundee received a bye in the 3rd round
Quarter-finals, 1st leg	27 March	(Switzerland) FC Zürich	H	1–0	Easton	13,500
Quarter-finals, 2nd leg	3 April	(Switzerland) FC Zürich	A	1–0	S. Wilson	25,000
Dundee won 2–0 on aggregate
Semi-finals, 1st leg	1 May	(England) Leeds United	H	1–1	B. Wilson	24,371
Semi-finals, 2nd leg	15 May	(England) Leeds United	A	0–1		28,830
Leeds United won 2–1 on aggregate

== Player statistics ==
Statistics provided by Dee Archive

No.	Pos	Nat	Player	Total		Division One		Scottish Cup		League Cup		Fairs Cup	
No.	Pos	Nat	Player	Apps	Goals	Apps	Goals	Apps	Goals	Apps	Goals	Apps	Goals
	GK	(Scotland) SCO	John Arrol	22	0	10	0	0	0	9	0	3	0
	MF	(Scotland) SCO	Alex Bryce	25	2	12+1	2	1	0	9	0	2	0
	FW	(Northern Ireland) NIR	Billy Campbell	53	12	32	9	3	1	10	2	8	0
	DF	(Scotland) SCO	Bobby Cox	18	0	6+1	0	0	0	8	0	3	0
	GK	(Scotland) SCO	Ally Donaldson	33	0	24	0	3	0	1	0	5	0
	MF	(Scotland) SCO	Jim Easton	32	1	23+1	0	3	0	0	0	5	1
	FW	(United Arab Republic) UAR	Roddy Georgeson	8	1	3+4	1	0	0	0	0	0+1	0
	MF	(Scotland) SCO	Doug Houston	35	1	25	1	3	0	2	0	5	0
	FW	(Scotland) SCO	Alex Kinninmonth	12	1	5+3	0	1+1	1	0	0	1+1	0
	FW	(Scotland) SCO	Derek McKay	3	0	3	0	0	0	0	0	0	0
	FW	(Scotland) SCO	George McLean	52	35	32	23	3	0	8+1	7	8	5
	FW	(Scotland) SCO	Jim McLean	55	18	34	9	3	0	10	7	8	2
	FW	(Scotland) SCO	Steve Murray	54	1	33	0	3	0	10	1	8	0
	FW	(Scotland) SCO	Jocky Scott	33	8	19+3	6	2	0	4+1	2	3+1	0
	DF	(Scotland) SCO	Ron Selway	4	0	2	0	0	0	0	0	2	0
	DF	(Scotland) SCO	Jim Steele	1	0	1	0	0	0	0	0	0	0
	DF	(Scotland) SCO	George Stewart	42	0	23	0	2	0	10	0	7	0
	DF	(Scotland) SCO	Alex Stuart	35	7	20	4	1	0	10	1	4	2
	DF	(Scotland) SCO	Davie Swan	10	0	9	0	0	0	0	0	1	0
	DF	(Scotland) SCO	Bobby Wilson	54	2	34	1	3	0	10	0	7	1
	FW	(Northern Ireland) NIR	Sammy Wilson	43	13	24	6	2	1	9	3	8	3

== See also ==
- List of Dundee F.C. seasons
