= 1969–70 Dundee F.C. season =

Dundee
1969–70 season
- Manager: John Prentice
- Division One: 6th
- Scottish Cup: Semi-finals
- League Cup: Group stage
- Top goalscorer: League: Gordon Wallace (22); All: Gordon Wallace (24)
Home colours

The 1969–70 season was the 68th season in which Dundee competed at a Scottish national level, playing in Division One, where the club would finish in 6th place. Domestically, Dundee would also compete in both the Scottish League Cup and the Scottish Cup, where they would get knocked out in the League Cup group stages, and make it to the Scottish Cup semi-finals before being knocked out by Celtic.

== Scottish Division One ==
Statistics provided by Dee Archive.

Match day	Date	Opponent	H/A	Score	Dundee scorer(s)	Attendance
1	30 August	Partick Thistle	H	0–1		3,000
2	3 September	Motherwell	H	1–3	Scott	5,400
3	6 September	Ayr United	H	1–0	Georgeson	5,000
4	13 September	Raith Rovers	A	0–0		4,000
5	20 September	Dundee United	H	1–2	Wallace	11,888
6	27 September	Aberdeen	A	1–1	Wilson	13,000
7	4 October	Airdrieonians	H	4–2	Scott (2), Gilroy (2)	5,000
8	11 October	Kilmarnock	A	0–3		
9	18 October	Clyde	H	3–0	Murray (2), Wallace	4,000
10	25 October	Greenock Morton	A	1–0	Wallace	5,000
11	1 November	Rangers	A	1–3	Wallace	30,000
12	8 November	Dunfermline Athletic	H	1–1	Wallace	7,000
13	15 November	St Johnstone	A	4–1	Wallace (3), Scott	6,000
14	22 November	Heart of Midlothian	H	2–0	Gilroy (2)	4,727
15	29 November	St Mirren	H	1–0	Wallace	5,000
16	6 December	Celtic	A	0–1		26,835
17	20 December	Motherwell	A	1–1	Wallace	4,500
18	27 December	Hibernian	H	1–0	Houston	10,466
19	1 January	Aberdeen	H	2–0	Steele, Bryce	12,000
20	3 January	Dundee United	A	1–4	Wallace	16,891
21	17 January	Raith Rovers	H	0–0		5,500
22	31 January	Ayr United	A	2–3	Kinninmonth, Wallace	5,000
23	9 February	Hibernian	A	1–4	Steele	6,409
24	25 February	Airdrieonians	A	1–0	Kinninmonth	
25	28 February	Kilmarnock	H	3–0	Houston, Scott, Wallace	9,000
26	7 March	Clyde	A	1–1	Wallace	2,000
27	11 March	St Mirren	A	1–2	Scott	4,800
28	21 March	Rangers	H	2–1	Wallace, Scott	17,000
29	25 March	Greenock Morton	H	2–1	Wallace (2)	6,000
30	28 March	Dunfermline Athletic	A	2–3	Wallace, Johnston	4,000
31	1 April	Partick Thistle	H	4–1	Wallace, Scott, Bryce, Kinninmonth	3,000
32	4 April	St Johnstone	H	0–2		6,500
33	8 April	Celtic	H	1–2	Wallace	11,900
34	12 April	Heart of Midlothian	A	3–1	Wallace (2), Scott	7,544

=== League table ===
Pos	Team	Pld	W	D	L	GF	GA	GD	Pts
4	Heart of Midlothian	34	13	12	9	50	36	+14	38
5	Dundee United	34	16	6	12	62	64	−2	38
6	Dundee	34	15	6	13	49	44	+5	36
7	Kilmarnock	34	13	10	11	62	57	+5	36
8	Aberdeen	34	14	7	13	55	45	+10	35

Source: "1969-1970 First Division - SPFL Archive". SPFL.

== Scottish League Cup ==
Statistics provided by Dee Archive.

=== Group 3 ===
Match day	Date	Opponent	H/A	Score	Dundee scorer(s)	Attendance
1	9 August	St Johnstone	A	1–3	Scott	6,600
2	13 August	Partick Thistle	H	4–0	Campbell, Gilroy (2), Stewart	7,000
3	16 August	Kilmarnock	H	0–0		10,000
4	20 August	Partick Thistle	A	1–0	Gilroy	2,000
5	23 August	St Johnstone	H	1–2	Scott	13,400
6	27 August	Kilmarnock	A	0–1		3,000

==== Group 3 table ====
Team	Pld	W	D	L	GF	GA	GR	Pts
St Johnstone	6	6	0	0	22	6	3.667	12
Kilmarnock	6	3	1	2	12	5	2.400	7
Dundee	6	2	1	3	7	6	1.167	5
Partick Thistle	6	0	0	6	1	25	0.040	0

== Scottish Cup ==
Statistics provided by Dee Archive.

Match day	Date	Opponent	H/A	Score	Dundee scorer(s)	Attendance
1st round	24 January	Albion Rovers	A	2–1	Bryce, Kinninmonth	2,710
2nd round	7 February	Airdrieonians	H	3–0	Kinninmonth (2), Wallace	10,000
Quarter-finals	21 February	East Fife	A	1–0	Bryce	14,994
Semi-finals	14 March	Celtic	N	1–2	Wallace	64,519

== Player statistics ==
Statistics provided by Dee Archive

No.	Pos	Nat	Player	Total		Division One		Scottish Cup		League Cup	
No.	Pos	Nat	Player	Apps	Goals	Apps	Goals	Apps	Goals	Apps	Goals
	MF	(Scotland) SCO	Alex Bryce	38	4	27+1	2	4	2	6	0
	FW	(Northern Ireland) NIR	Billy Campbell	28	1	18+1	0	3	0	6	1
	GK	(Scotland) SCO	Ally Donaldson	44	0	34	0	4	0	6	0
	FW	(Scotland) SCO	John Duncan	3	0	2	0	0	0	1	0
	MF	(Scotland) SCO	Jim Easton	27	0	23	0	4	0	0	0
	MF	(Scotland) SCO	Jim Fraser	8	0	2	0	0	0	6	0
	FW	(United Arab Republic) UAR	Roddy Georgeson	2	1	2	1	0	0	0	0
	FW	(Scotland) SCO	Joe Gilroy	20	6	14	4	0	0	6	2
	MF	(Scotland) SCO	Doug Houston	40	2	30	2	4	0	6	0
	DF	(Scotland) SCO	Davie Johnston	3	1	3	1	0	0	0	0
	FW	(Scotland) SCO	Alex Kinninmonth	38	6	26+3	3	4	3	4+1	0
	FW	(Scotland) SCO	Steve Murray	34	2	25	2	3	0	6	0
	FW	(Scotland) SCO	Jocky Scott	42	11	32	9	4	0	6	2
	DF	(Scotland) SCO	Ron Selway	34	0	29	0	4	0	1	0
	DF	(Scotland) SCO	Jim Steele	29	2	23+1	2	4	0	1	0
	DF	(Scotland) SCO	George Stewart	28	1	21+1	0	1	0	5	1
	DF	(Scotland) SCO	Davie Swan	12	0	11	0	0	0	1	0
	FW	(Scotland) SCO	Gordon Wallace	34	24	30	22	4	2	0	0
	DF	(Scotland) SCO	Bobby Wilson	28	1	22	1	1	0	5	0

== See also ==
- List of Dundee F.C. seasons
