= 1966–67 Dundee F.C. season =

Dundee
1966–67 season
- Manager: Bobby Ancell
- Division One: 6th
- Scottish Cup: 1st round
- League Cup: Group Stage
- Top goalscorer: League: Jim McLean (13); All: Jim McLean (17)
Home colours

The 1966–67 season was the 65th season in which Dundee competed at a Scottish national level, playing in Division One, where the club would finish in 6th place. domestically, Dundee would also compete in both the Scottish League Cup and the Scottish Cup, where they would be knocked out in the group stages of the League Cup 1966-67, and by Aberdeen in the 1st round of the Scottish Cup 1966-67.

== Scottish Division One ==
Statistics provided by Dee Archive.

Match day	Date	Opponent	H/A	Score	Dundee scorer(s)	Attendance
1	10 September	Aberdeen	H	2–1	Cameron, Penman	10,000
2	17 September	Dundee United	A	4–1	Cameron, Penman (2), McKay	10,198
3	24 September	Celtic	H	1–2	Penman	27,535
4	1 October	Heart of Midlothian	A	1–3	Stuart	7,182
5	8 October	Kilmarnock	H	1–1	Kinninmonth	9,000
6	15 October	Falkirk	A	2–3	Cameron, Penman	4,500
7	22 October	Motherwell	H	3–0	Penman, McLean, Scott	8,500
8	29 October	Partick Thistle	A	0–0		3,500
9	5 November	St Johnstone	H	4–0	Penman (3), McLean	10,000
10	12 November	Ayr United	A	1–1	Wilson	5,000
11	19 November	Hibernian	H	2–1	McLean (2)	8,073
12	26 November	Stirling Albion	A	3–2	McLean (2) (pen.), Kinninmonth	4,000
13	3 December	St Mirren	H	2–0	McLean, Stuart	6,000
14	10 December	Clyde	H	3–4	Wilson, Campbell, Kinninmonth	6,000
15	17 December	Dunfermline Athletic	A	1–0	Campbell	5,000
16	24 December	Airdrieonians	H	0–0		7,000
17	31 December	Rangers	A	2–2	Bryce, Cameron	26,898
18	2 January	Aberdeen	A	2–5	Cameron (2)	17,000
19	3 January	Dundee United	H	2–3	Scott, Bryce	17,286
20	7 January	Celtic	A	1–5	Cameron	32,855
21	14 January	Heart of Midlothian	H	1–1	Houston	10,168
22	21 January	Kilmarnock	A	4–4	Kinninmonth (2), Bryce (2)	4,000
23	4 February	Falkirk	H	4–1	Scott (2), McLean (2)	6,500
24	11 February	Motherwell	A	3–5	Murray, Scott (2)	4,500
25	25 February	Partick Thistle	H	0–0		6,000
26	4 March	St Johnstone	A	3–0	Scott, Bryce, Wilson	5,000
27	10 March	Ayr United	H	3–0	Bryce, Scott, Stuart	5,000
28	18 March	Hibernian	A	1–2	Wilson	10,478
29	25 March	Stirling Albion	H	2–0	Scott (2) (pen.)	4,500
30	1 April	St Mirren	A	5–0	McLean (2), Campbell, Wilson, Stuart	3,000
31	8 April	Clyde	A	3–1	Scott, Wilson (2)	2,500
32	12 April	Dunfermline Athletic	H	3–1	McLean (2), Stuart	8,000
33	22 April	Airdrieonians	A	4–1	Wilson (2), Campbell, Cameron	2,000
34	29 April	Rangers	H	1–1	Scott	16,851

=== League table ===
Pos	Team	Pld	W	D	L	GF	GA	GD	Pts
4	Aberdeen	34	17	8	9	72	38	+34	42
5	Hibernian	34	19	4	11	72	49	+23	42
6	Dundee	34	16	9	9	74	51	+23	41
7	Kilmarnock	34	16	8	10	59	46	+13	40
8	Dunfermline Athletic	34	14	10	10	72	52	+20	38

Source: RSSSF

== Scottish League Cup ==
Statistics provided by Dee Archive.

=== Group 1 ===
Match day	Date	Opponent	H/A	Score	Dundee scorer(s)	Attendance
1	13 August	Dundee United	A	0–2		13,867
2	17 August	Aberdeen	H	3–4	Scott, McLean (2)	9,500
3	20 August	St Johnstone	H	2–0	McLean, Cameron	8,000
4	27 August	Dundee United	H	1–1	Penman	10,087
5	31 August	Aberdeen	A	0–2		12,000
6	3 September	St Johnstone	A	2–2	McLean, Cameron	3,200

==== Group 1 table ====
Team	Pld	W	D	L	GF	GA	GR	Pts
Aberdeen	6	6	0	0	20	7	2.857	12
Dundee United	6	2	2	2	13	13	1.000	6
Dundee	6	1	2	3	8	11	0.727	4
St Johnstone	6	0	2	4	6	16	0.375	2

== Scottish Cup ==
Statistics provided by Dee Archive.

Match day	Date	Opponent	H/A	Score	Dundee scorer(s)	Attendance
1st round	28 January	Aberdeen	H	0–5		23,000

== Player statistics ==
Statistics provided by Dee Archive

No.	Pos	Nat	Player	Total		Division One		Scottish Cup		League Cup	
No.	Pos	Nat	Player	Apps	Goals	Apps	Goals	Apps	Goals	Apps	Goals
	GK	(Scotland) SCO	John Arrol	30	0	28	0	1	0	1	0
	MF	(Scotland) SCO	Alex Bryce	24	6	22	6	1	0	1	0
	FW	(Scotland) SCO	Kenny Cameron	24	10	13+5	8	1	0	4+1	2
	FW	(Northern Ireland) NIR	Billy Campbell	25	4	24	4	0	0	1	0
	DF	(Scotland) SCO	Bobby Cox	33	0	29	0	0	0	4	0
	GK	(Scotland) SCO	Ally Donaldson	11	0	6	0	0	0	5	0
	MF	(Scotland) SCO	Jim Easton	31	0	25	0	1	0	5	0
	DF	(Scotland) SCO	Alex Hamilton	22	0	19	0	1	0	2	0
	FW	(Scotland) SCO	Tony Harvey	1	0	0	0	0	0	0+1	0
	MF	(Scotland) SCO	Doug Houston	16	1	11	1	1	0	4	0
	FW	(Scotland) SCO	Alex Kinninmonth	23	5	17+4	5	1	0	1	0
	FW	(Scotland) SCO	Derek McKay	10	1	7+2	1	0	0	1	0
	FW	(Scotland) SCO	Jim McLean	36	17	29	13	1	0	6	4
	FW	(Scotland) SCO	Steve Murray	39	1	32	1	1	0	6	0
	MF	(Scotland) SCO	Andy Penman	22	10	16	9	0+1	0	5	1
	FW	(Scotland) SCO	Jocky Scott	26	13	20	12	1	0	5	1
	DF	(Scotland) SCO	Ron Selway	10	0	4	0	0	0	6	0
	DF	(Scotland) SCO	George Stewart	9	0	9	0	0	0	0	0
	DF	(Scotland) SCO	Alex Stuart	36	5	30	5	1	0	5	0
	DF	(Scotland) SCO	Bobby Wilson	19	0	15	0	0	0	4	0
	FW	(Northern Ireland) NIR	Sammy Wilson	19	9	18+1	9	0	0	0	0

== See also ==
- List of Dundee F.C. seasons
