= 1965–66 Dundee F.C. season =

Dundee
1965–66 season
- Manager: Bobby Ancell
- Division One: 9th
- Scottish Cup: 2nd round
- League Cup: Group Stage
- Top goalscorer: League: Andy Penman (15); All: Andy Penman (19)
Home colours

The 1965–66 season was the 64th season in which Dundee competed at a Scottish national level, playing in Division One, where the club would finish in 9th place. Domestically, Dundee would also compete in both the Scottish League Cup and the Scottish Cup, where they would be knocked out in the group stages of the League Cup, and by Celtic in the 2nd round of the Scottish Cup.

== Scottish Division One ==
Statistics provided by Dee Archive.

Match day	Date	Opponent	H/A	Score	Dundee scorer(s)	Attendance
1	25 August	Clyde	A	2–0	Penman, Bertelsen	2,500
2	11 September	Dundee United	H	0–5		15,058
3	18 September	Aberdeen	A	3–2	Penman, Cooke, Bertelsen	8,000
4	25 September	Rangers	H	1–1	Bertelsen	21,451
5	2 October	Heart of Midlothian	A	0–0		11,605
6	9 October	Falkirk	H	2–0	McLean, Murray	8,000
7	16 October	Kilmarnock	A	3–5	McLean, Penman, Cameron	8,000
8	27 October	Celtic	H	1–2	Penman	15,551
9	30 October	St Mirren	A	5–2	Murray (2), Cameron, Stuart, Bertelsen	2,500
10	6 November	Greenock Morton	A	2–2	Cameron, Penman	6,000
11	13 November	Hibernian	H	4–3	Cooke, Houston, Bertelsen, Murray	11,948
12	20 November	St Johnstone	H	3–1	Cameron, Penman, Houston	9,000
13	27 November	Stirling Albion	A	4–1	Cameron, Penman, Houston, Murray	2,000
14	18 December	Partick Thistle	A	0–2		3,500
15	25 December	Motherwell	H	4–0	Cameron (3), Bertelsen	8,000
16	3 January	Dundee United	A	1–2	Murray	21,325
17	8 January	Clyde	H	1–4	Harvey	9,000
18	29 January	Falkirk	A	1–3	Penman (pen.)	5,000
19	12 February	Kilmarnock	H	0–2		8,000
20	26 February	St Mirren	H	3–2	Penman, Cameron (2)	7,000
21	28 February	Celtic	A	0–5		21,358
22	5 March	Greenock Morton	H	5–1	Stuart, McLean (2), Penman, Wilson	8,000
23	9 March	Hamilton Academical	H	2–1	McLean, Wilson	7,000
24	12 March	Hibernian	A	1–1	Wilson	8,302
25	19 March	St Johnstone	A	0–1		7,000
26	26 March	Stirling Albion	H	6–2	Penman (3), Cooke (2), Cameron	6,000
27	4 April	Rangers	A	0–1		12,421
28	9 April	Dunfermline Athletic	A	2–2	Stuart, Cameron	4,266
29	13 April	Heart of Midlothian	H	1–0	Penman	5,157
30	16 April	Hamilton Academical	A	2–1	Murray, Penman	750
31	20 April	Aberdeen	H	1–2	Murray	5,500
32	23 April	Partick Thistle	H	1–1	McLean	4,000
33	27 April	Dunfermline Athletic	H	0–2		3,500
34	30 April	Motherwell	A	0–2		3,000

=== League table ===
Pos	Team	Pld	W	D	L	GF	GA	GD	Pts
7	Hearts	34	13	12	9	56	48	+8	38
8	Aberdeen	34	15	6	13	61	54	+7	36
9	Dundee	34	14	6	14	61	61	0	34
10	Falkirk	34	15	1	18	48	72	−24	31
11	Clyde	34	13	4	17	62	64	−2	30

Source: RSSSF

== Scottish League Cup ==
Statistics provided by Dee Archive.

=== Group 1 ===
Match day	Date	Opponent	H/A	Score	Dundee scorer(s)	Attendance
1	14 August	Motherwell	A	0–1		6,000
2	18 August	Dundee United	H	0–0		23,095
3	21 August	Celtic	A	2–0	Cameron (2)	31,343
4	28 August	Motherwell	H	1–2	Cameron	12,000
5	1 September	Dundee United	A	3–1	Cameron (2), Murray	18,705
6	4 September	Celtic	H	1–3	Penman	22,262

==== Group 1 table ====
Team	Pld	W	D	L	GF	GA	GR	Pts
Celtic	6	4	0	2	11	7	1.571	8
Motherwell	6	3	0	3	9	11	0.818	6
Dundee	6	2	1	3	7	7	1.000	5
Dundee United	6	2	1	3	9	11	0.818	5

== Scottish Cup ==
Statistics provided by Dee Archive.

Match day	Date	Opponent	H/A	Score	Dundee scorer(s)	Attendance
1st round	9 February	East Fife	H	9–1	Penman (3), Cox, McLean (2), Cameron, Stuart (2)	8,000
2nd round	23 February	Celtic	H	0–2		29,000

== Player statistics ==
Statistics provided by Dee Archive

No.	Pos	Nat	Player	Total		Division One		Scottish Cup		League Cup	
No.	Pos	Nat	Player	Apps	Goals	Apps	Goals	Apps	Goals	Apps	Goals
	GK	(Scotland) SCO	John Arrol	6	0	5	0	1	0	0	0
	DF	(Scotland) SCO	Norrie Beattie	3	0	2	0	1	0	0	0
	FW	(Denmark) DEN	Carl Bertelsen	22	6	15	6	1	0	6	0
	FW	(Scotland) SCO	Kenny Cameron	36	18	28	12	2	1	6	5
	FW	(Scotland) SCO	Charlie Cooke	34	4	26	4	2	0	6	0
	FW	(Scotland) SCO	Alan Cousin	9	0	3	0	0	0	6	0
	DF	(Scotland) SCO	Bobby Cox	28	1	27	0	1	1	0	0
	GK	(Scotland) SCO	Ally Donaldson	36	0	29	0	1	0	6	0
	MF	(Scotland) SCO	Jim Easton	42	0	34	0	2	0	6	0
	DF	(Scotland) SCO	Alex Hamilton	30	0	22	0	2	0	6	0
	FW	(Scotland) SCO	Tony Harvey	5	1	5	1	0	0	0	0
	MF	(Scotland) SCO	Doug Houston	21	3	15	3	0	0	6	0
	FW	(Scotland) SCO	Alex Kinninmonth	6	0	6	0	0	0	0	0
	FW	(Scotland) SCO	Jim McLean	29	8	27	6	2	2	0	0
	FW	(Scotland) SCO	Steve Murray	41	9	33	8	2	0	6	1
	MF	(Scotland) SCO	Andy Penman	41	19	33	15	2	3	6	1
	MF	(Scotland) SCO	George Ryden	6	0	4	0	1	0	1	0
	FW	(Scotland) SCO	Jocky Scott	7	0	7	0	0	0	0	0
	DF	(Scotland) SCO	Alex Stuart	39	5	32	3	2	2	5	0
	DF	(Scotland) SCO	Davie Swan	3	0	3	0	0	0	0	0
	DF	(Scotland) SCO	Bobby Wilson	11	0	11	0	0	0	0	0
	FW	(Northern Ireland) NIR	Sammy Wilson	7	3	7	3	0	0	0	0

== See also ==
- List of Dundee F.C. seasons
