= George Stewart =

George Stewart may refer to:

== Business and industry ==
- George William Stewart (1793–1841), Postmaster General of Ceylon
- G. F. Stewart (George Francis Stewart, 1851–1928), Irish land agent
- George Stewart (New Zealand businessman) (1885–1955), New Zealand wool and fur skin exporter
- George Osborne Wauchope Stewart (fl. 1929–1969), British banker

== Law and politics ==
- George Vesey Stewart (1832–1920), New Zealand farmer, colonizer and local politician
- George H. Stewart (1858–1914), American jurist; associate justice of the Idaho Supreme Court
- J. George Stewart (1890–1970), American architect and politician

== Military ==
- George Stewart, 9th Seigneur d'Aubigny (1618–1642), Scottish nobleman and Royalist commander in the English Civil War
- George Stewart, 8th Earl of Galloway (1768–1834), British naval commander and politician
- George Stewart (VC) (1831–1868), Scottish recipient of the Victoria Cross
- George E. Stewart (1872–1946), US Army officer and Philippine-American War Medal of Honor recipient

== Science and medicine ==
- George Stewart (surgeon) (1752–1813), Irish physician; president of the Royal College of Surgeons
- George Neil Stewart (1860–1930), Scottish-Canadian doctor
- George F. Stewart (1908–1982), American food scientist
- George W. Stewart (1876–1956), American physicist

== Sports ==
=== Association football (soccer) ===
- George Stewart (1890s footballer) (a.k.a. Tom Stewart, fl. 1890s), Scottish footballer for Partick Thistle, Motherwell, Newcastle United
- George Stewart (footballer, born 1883) (1882–1962), Scottish footballer for Hibernian, Manchester City, Scotland
- George Stewart (footballer, born 1920) (1920–2012), Scottish footballer
- George Stewart (footballer, born 1927) (1927–2011), Scottish footballer
- George Stewart (footballer, born 1932) (1932–1998), Scottish footballer
- George Stewart (footballer, born 1947), Scottish footballer

=== Australian rules football ===
- George Stewart (footballer, born 1873) (1873–1937), Australian rules footballer for St Kilda
- George Stewart (footballer, born 1882) (1882–1966), Australian rules footballer for Carlton
- George Stewart (footballer, born 1901) (1901–1994), Australian rules footballer for South Melbourne

=== Other sports ===
- George A. Stewart (1862–1894), American football coach at Harvard University
- Leon Duray (born George Stewart, 1894–1956), American race car driver
- George Stewart (American football) (born 1958), American football coach
- George Stewart (tennis) (fl, 1940s–1950s), Panama-born tennis player

== Others ==
- George Wilson Stewart (1862–1937), American architect
- George Craig Stewart (1879–1940), American clergyman; bishop of the Episcopal Diocese of Chicago
- George R. Stewart (1895–1980), American professor and novelist

== See also ==
- George Stuart (disambiguation)
- George Steuart (disambiguation)
