= 1964–65 Dundee F.C. season =

Dundee
1964–65 season
- Manager: Bob Shankly (until Feb. 1965); Sammy Kean (caretaker) (Feb. – Mar.); Bobby Ancell (from Mar. 1965)
- Division One: 6th
- Scottish Cup: 1st round
- League Cup: Group Stage
- Cup Winners' Cup: 2nd round
- Summer Cup: Group Stage
- Top goalscorer: League: Andy Penman (24); All: Andy Penman (33)
Home colours

The 1964–65 season was the 63rd season in which Dundee competed at a Scottish national level, playing in Division One, where the club would finish in 6th place for the second consecutive season. Domestically, Dundee would also compete in both the Scottish League Cup and the Scottish Cup, where they would be knocked out in the group stages of the League Cup, and by St Johnstone in the 1st round of the Scottish Cup. The club would return to European football, playing in the European Cup Winner's Cup, where they would be eliminated in the 2nd round by Spanish side Real Zaragoza. They would also compete in the Summer Cup. Dundee's long-time, league-winning manager Bob Shankly resigned in February 1965 to take the Hibernian job, and was replaced by former Dundee player Bobby Ancell a month later.

== Scottish Division One ==
Statistics provided by Dee Archive.

Match day	Date	Opponent	H/A	Score	Dundee scorer(s)	Attendance
1	19 August	Greenock Morton	A	2–3	Cousin, Penman	15,000
2	5 September	Aberdeen	H	3–1	Penman (2), Stuart	8,000
3	12 September	Dundee United	A	4–1	Cousin, Waddell, Scott (2)	16,838
4	19 September	Rangers	H	4–1	Stuart, Cousin, Robertson (2)	21,451
5	26 September	Motherwell	A	1–2	Penman	7,000
6	3 October	Clyde	H	1–2	Cameron	10,000
7	10 October	Falkirk	A	2–4	Stuart, Cameron	4,000
8	17 October	Kilmarnock	H	1–3	Murray	14,000
9	24 October	Heart of Midlothian	H	1–2	Waddell	14,629
10	31 October	St Mirren	A	2–0	Gilzean (2)	2,500
11	7 November	Dunfermline Athletic	H	3–1	Penman (2), Cousin	14,000
12	14 November	Celtic	A	2–0	Penman, Murray	13,578
13	21 November	Partick Thistle	H	3–3	Penman, Stuart, Robertson	11,000
14	28 November	Hibernian	A	2–2	Murray, Penman	11,622
15	5 December	St Johnstone	H	4–4	Gilzean (3), Penman	12,000
16	12 December	Third Lanark	A	1–0	Baillie (o.g.)	2,500
17	19 December	Airdrieonians	H	4–0	Harley (3), Cooke	9,000
18	26 December	Greenock Morton	H	1–1	Harley	10,000
19	1 January	Aberdeen	A	1–1	Penman	8,000
20	9 January	Rangers	A	0–4		28,000
21	16 January	Motherwell	H	4–2	Cousin, Cooke, Cameron, Robertson	10,500
22	10 February	Falkirk	H	3–2	Penman (2), Cooke	5,300
23	13 February	Kilmarnock	A	4–1	Cooke (2), Murray, Robertson	6,000
24	20 February	Clyde	A	0–1		4,500
25	27 February	Heart of Midlothian	A	7–1	Penman (3) (pen.), Cameron (3), Cousin	13,393
26	6 March	St Mirren	H	2–1	Penman (2)	11,000
27	13 March	Dunfermline Athletic	A	3–3	Murray, Cameron, Cousin	10,000
28	20 March	Celtic	H	3–3	Cameron (2), Murdoch (o.g.)	16,935
29	24 March	Dundee United	H	2–4	Cooke, Cameron	16,598
30	27 March	Partick Thistle	A	4–4	Cameron (2), Penman (2)	6,000
31	3 April	Hibernian	H	2–1	Scott (2)	15,813
32	9 April	St Johnstone	A	2–2	Penman (2) (pen.)	7,500
33	17 April	Third Lanark	H	6–1	Scott (2), Penman (2), Cousin, Cooke	8,000
34	24 April	Airdrieonians	A	2–2	Cameron (2)	1,000

=== League table ===
Pos	Team	Pld	W	D	L	GF	GA	GAv	Pts
4	Hibernian	34	21	4	9	75	47	1.596	46
5	Rangers	34	18	8	8	78	35	2.229	44
6	Dundee	34	15	10	9	86	63	1.365	40
7	Clyde	34	17	6	11	64	58	1.103	40
8	Celtic	34	16	5	13	76	57	1.333	37

Source: RSSSF

== Scottish League Cup ==
Statistics provided by Dee Archive.

=== Group 4 ===
Match day	Date	Opponent	H/A	Score	Dundee scorer(s)	Attendance
1	8 August	Dundee United	H	2–3	Penman (pen.), Waddell	16,773
2	12 August	Motherwell	A	0–3		8,000
3	15 August	Falkirk	H	4–1	Penman, Houston, Waddell, Kinninmonth	9,000
4	22 August	Dundee United	A	1–2	Stuart	14,519
5	26 August	Motherwell	H	6–0	Waddell (3), Penman (2), Cousin	9,000
6	29 August	Falkirk	A	3–1	Penman, Waddell, Cousin	3,500

==== Group 4 table ====
Team	Pld	W	D	L	GF	GA	GR	Pts
Dundee United	6	5	0	1	13	9	1.444	10
Dundee	6	3	0	3	16	10	1.600	6
Motherwell	6	2	1	3	8	11	0.727	5
Falkirk	6	1	1	4	9	16	0.563	3

== Scottish Cup ==
Statistics provided by Dee Archive.

Match day	Date	Opponent	H/A	Score	Dundee scorer(s)	Attendance
1st round	6 February	St Johnstone	A	0–1		17,000

== European Cup Winners' Cup ==
Statistics provided by Dee Archive. Dundee would receive a bye in the 1st round.

Match day	Date	Opponent	H/A	Score	Dundee scorer(s)	Attendance
2nd round, 1st leg	18 November	(Spain) Real Zaragoza	H	2–2	Murray, Houston	21,000
2nd round, 2nd leg	8 December	(Spain) Real Zaragoza	A	1–2	Robertson	23,000
Real Zaragoza won 4–3 on aggregate

== Summer Cup ==
Statistics provided by Dee Archive.

=== Group 2 ===
Match day	Date	Opponent	H/A	Score	Dundee scorer(s)	Attendance
1	1 May	Dundee United	A	1–4	Stuart	12,000
2	5 May	Aberdeen	A	1–3	Cameron	5,000
3	8 May	St Johnstone	H	2–1	Cameron, Penman	5,000
4	12 May	Dundee United	H	2–3	Penman (2)	12,000
5	15 May	Aberdeen	H	1–2	Penman	4,000
6	19 May	St Johnstone	A	3–2	Cameron (2), Richmond (o.g.)	2,000

==== Group table ====
Pos	Team	Pld	W	D	L	GF	GA	GD	Pts
1	Dundee United	6	6	0	0	21	6	+15	12
2	Aberdeen	6	3	0	3	8	9	−1	6
3	Dundee	6	2	0	4	10	15	−5	4
4	St Johnstone	6	1	0	5	7	16	−9	2

Updated to match(es) played on unknown. Source:

== Player statistics ==
Statistics provided by Dee Archive

No.	Pos	Nat	Player	Total		Division One		Scottish Cup		League Cup		Cup Winners' Cup		Summer Cup	
No.	Pos	Nat	Player	Apps	Goals	Apps	Goals	Apps	Goals	Apps	Goals	Apps	Goals	Apps	Goals
	DF	(Scotland) SCO	Norrie Beattie	13	0	6	0	0	0	0	0	1	0	6	0
	FW	(Scotland) SCO	Kenny Cameron	26	18	16	14	1	0	2	0	1	0	6	4
	FW	(Scotland) SCO	Charlie Cooke	25	7	18	7	1	0	0	0	0	0	6	0
	FW	(Scotland) SCO	Alan Cousin	44	10	34	8	1	0	6	2	2	0	1	0
	DF	(Scotland) SCO	Bobby Cox	22	0	15	0	1	0	4	0	2	0	0	0
	GK	(Scotland) SCO	Ally Donaldson	40	0	30	0	0	0	2	0	2	0	6	0
	MF	(Scotland) SCO	Jim Easton	33	0	26	0	1	0	0	0	0	0	6	0
	FW	(Scotland) SCO	Alan Gilzean	7	5	7	5	0	0	0	0	0	0	0	0
	DF	(Scotland) SCO	Alex Hamilton	40	0	29	0	1	0	6	0	2	0	2	0
	FW	(Scotland) SCO	Alex Harley	10	4	10	4	0	0	0	0	0	0	0	0
	FW	(Scotland) SCO	Tony Harvey	4	0	0	0	0	0	0	0	0	0	4	0
	MF	(Scotland) SCO	Doug Houston	11	2	5	0	0	0	3	1	2	1	1	0
	FW	(Scotland) SCO	Alex Kinninmonth	3	1	2	0	0	0	1	1	0	0	0	0
	FW	(Scotland) SCO	Steve Murray	27	6	23	5	0	0	2	0	2	1	0	0
	MF	(Scotland) SCO	Andy Penman	49	33	34	24	1	0	6	5	2	0	6	4
	MF	(Scotland) SCO	John Phillips	6	0	4	0	0	0	2	0	0	0	0	0
	DF	(Scotland) SCO	Hugh Reid	11	0	7	0	0	0	0	0	0	0	4	0
	FW	(Scotland) SCO	Hugh Robertson	42	6	32	5	1	0	3	0	2	1	4	0
	MF	(Scotland) SCO	George Ryden	20	0	8	0	0	0	6	0	1	0	5	0
	FW	(Scotland) SCO	Jocky Scott	11	6	6	6	0	0	2	0	0	0	3	0
	MF	(Scotland) SCO	Bobby Seith	12	0	7	0	1	0	4	0	0	0	0	0
	GK	(Scotland) SCO	Bert Slater	9	0	4	0	1	0	4	0	0	0	0	0
	DF	(Scotland) SCO	Alex Stuart	49	6	34	4	1	0	6	1	2	0	6	1
	DF	(Scotland) SCO	Alex Totten	11	0	9	0	0	0	2	0	0	0	0	0
	FW	(Scotland) SCO	Bobby Waddell	14	8	8	2	0	0	5	6	1	0	0	0

== See also ==
- List of Dundee F.C. seasons
