= 1967 Scottish League Cup final =

- Event: 1967–68 Scottish League Cup
Dundee	Celtic
3	5
- Date: 28 October 1967
- Venue: Hampden Park, Glasgow
- Attendance: 70,000

The 1967 Scottish League Cup final was played on 28 October 1967 at Hampden Park in Glasgow and was the final of the 22nd Scottish League Cup competition. The final was contested by Dundee and Celtic, with Dundee becoming the first side from outside the Old Firm to reach a League Cup final since 1963. Celtic won a high-scoring match by 5–3, with Stevie Chalmers, John Hughes, Bobby Lennox and Willie Wallace all scoring for Celtic. George McLean and Jim McLean scored Dundee's goals.

== Match details ==
28 October 1967

Dundee	3–5	Celtic
G. McLean; J. McLean		Chalmers; Hughes; Lennox; Wallace

Hampden Park, Glasgow
Attendance: 70,000

DUNDEE:
GK	John Arroll
FB	Bobby Wilson
FB	Doug Houston
RH	Steve Murray
CH	George Stewart
LH	Alex Stuart (c)
RW	Billy Campbell
IF	Jim McLean
CF	Sammy Wilson
IF	George McLean
LW	Alex Bryce
Substitutes:
FB	Bobby Cox
Manager:
Bobby Ancell

CELTIC:
GK	Ronnie Simpson
FB	Jim Craig
FB	Tommy Gemmell
RH	Bobby Murdoch
CH	Billy McNeill (c)
LH	John Clark
RW	Stevie Chalmers
IF	Bobby Lennox
CF	Willie Wallace
IF	Bertie Auld	(substituted off) 45'
LW	John Hughes
Substitutes:
FB	Willie O'Neill	(substituted on) 45'
Manager:
Jock Stein
