= 1969–70 Scottish Cup =

Tournament details
- Country: Scotland

Final positions
- Champions: Aberdeen
- Runners-up: Celtic

The 1969–70 Scottish Cup was in the 85th season of Scotland's most prestigious football knockout competition. The Cup was won by Aberdeen who defeated Celtic in the final.

== First preliminary round ==
6 December 1969	Alloa	3–1	Peterhead
	Hodge 10'; McCulloch 28'; McCallan	Report	Third 62'	Attendance: 1,750 (estimated); Referee: R Gordon

6 December 1969	Berwick Rangers	1–0	Brechin City	Berwick
	Jones 24'	Report		Stadium: Shielfield Park; Referee: E H Pringle

6 December 1969	Forres Mechanics	0–2	Clydebank	Forres
		Report	Caskie 54'; Fallon 61' (pen.)	Stadium: Mosset Park; Referee: R C Greenlees

6 December 1969	Stenhousemuir	0–1	Gala Fairydean	Stenhousemuir
		Report	Pajak 60'	Stadium: Ochilview Park; Referee: A S McDonald

6 December 1969	Stranraer	3–1	East Stirlingshire	Stranraer
	Copland 20' 59'; Campbell	Report	McCallum	Stadium: Stair Park; Attendance: 750 (estimated); Referee: T Kellock

== Second preliminary round ==
20 December 1969	Inverness Caledonian	5–0	Ross County
	Finnie 28' 30'; Johnston 60'; Neill 65'	Report		Referee: I K Bain

20 December 1969	Montrose	2–1	Cowdenbeath
	Kemp 30'; Livingstone 68'	Report	Sharpe 11'	Referee: J R Grant

20 December 1969	Stranraer	1–1	St Cuthbert Wanderers
	Campbell	Report	McGowan 73'

20 December 1969	Vale of Leithen	1–2	Hamilton Academical
	Buchanan	Report	Brown; Gilchrist

24 December 1969	Albion Rovers	1–0	Berwick Rangers	Coatbridge
	Ferris	Report

24 December 1969	Clydebank	1–0	Queen's Park	Clydebank
	McGhee 78'	Report		Stadium: Kilbowie Park; Referee: E Thomson

27 December 1969	Gala Fairydean	1–4	Dumbarton
	Hamilton	Report	McCormack 40'; Boyd	Referee: A E Currie

27 December 1969	Tarff Rovers	1–0	Alloa
	McNight pen'	Report

=== Replay ===
25 December 1969	St Cuthbert Wanderers	0–5	Stranraer
		Report	Symington; Orr; Copland

== First round ==
24 January 1970	Aberdeen	4–0	Clyde	Aberdeen
	Harper 6' 36'; Robb 19' 51'	Report		Stadium: Pittodrie Stadium; Attendance: 12,000 (estimated); Referee: R D Henderson

24 January 1970	Airdrieonians	5–0	Hamilton Academical	Airdrie
	Whiteford 6'; Jarvie 51' (pen.) 62' (pen.) 65' 76'	Report		Stadium: Broomfield Park; Referee: A F McDonald

24 January 1970	Albion Rovers	1–2	Dundee	Coatbridge
	McGovern 50'	Report	Bryce 8'; Kinninmonth 42'	Stadium: Cliftonhill Stadium; Referee: T Kellock

24 January 1970	Arbroath	1–2	Clydebank
	Cant 31'	Report	Caskie 70'; Love 74'	Referee: W Anderson

24 January 1970	Celtic	2–1	Dunfermline Athletic	Glasgow
	Hughes 81'; Hood 89'	Report	Gillespie 60'	Stadium: Celtic Park; Referee: W J Mullen

24 January 1970	Dumbarton	1–2	Forfar Athletic
	McGhee	Report	Waddell 11'; May 58'	Referee: E H Pringle

24 January 1970	Dundee United	1–0	Ayr United	Dundee
	Mitchell 42' (pen.)	Report		Stadium: Tannadice Park; Referee: J W Paterson

24 January 1970	East Fife	3–0	Raith Rovers
	Waddell 12'; Finlayson	Report		Referee: J R P Gordon

24 January 1970	Falkirk	3–0	Tarff Rovers
	Ferguson 8' 58'; Roxburgh	Report		Referee: J M Kelly

24 January 1970	Kilmarnock	3–0	Partick Thistle	Kilmarnock
	Morrison 8'; Cook 43'; Mathie 58'	Report		Stadium: Rugby Park; Referee: I M D Foote

24 January 1970	Montrose	1–1	Hearts	Montrose
	Livingstone	Report	Fleming 89'	Stadium: Links Park; Referee: A F J Webster

24 January 1970	Greenock Morton	2–0	Queen of the South	Greenock
	Sweeney; McChesney o.g'	Report		Stadium: Cappielow Park; Referee: T Marshall

24 January 1970	Motherwell	2–1	St Johnstone	Motherwell
	McInally 25'; Deans 39'	Report	Hall 2'	Stadium: Fir Park; Referee: A McKenzie

24 January 1970	Rangers	3–1	Hibernian	Glasgow
	A MacDonald 12' 53'; Penman 39'	Report	Graham 16'	Stadium: Ibrox Park; Attendance: 73,716; Referee: T Wharton

24 January 1970	St Mirren	2–0	Stirling Albion	Paisley
	Young 65' 72'	Report		Stadium: Love Street; Referee: J Callaghan

24 January 1970	Stranraer	2–5	Inverness Caledonian	Stranraer
	Dillon 47'; Copland	Report	Allan 40'; Finnie 43'; Neild	Stadium: Stair Park; Referee: J C B McRoberts

=== Replay ===
27 January 1970	Hearts	1–0	Montrose	Edinburgh
	Fleming 87'	Report		Stadium: Tynecastle Park; Referee: A F J Webster

== Second round ==
7 February 1970	Celtic	4–0	Dundee United	Glasgow
	Hughes; Macari; Wallace	Report		Stadium: Celtic Park; Referee: A McKenzie

7 February 1970	Dundee	3–0	Airdrieonians	Dundee
	Kinninmonth; Wallace	Report		Stadium: Dens Park

7 February 1970	East Fife	1–0	Greenock Morton	Methil
	Rankin og'	Report		Stadium: Bayview Park

7 February 1970	Falkirk	2–1	St Mirren	Falkirk
	Hoggan 4'; Ferguson	Report	McFadden	Stadium: Brockville Park

7 February 1970	Forfar Athletic	0–7	Rangers	Forfar
		Report	Stein; A MacDonald; Penman; Johansen pen' Greig	Stadium: Station Park

7 February 1970	Kilmarnock	2–0	Hearts	Kilmarnock
	Cook 4'; Mathie 59'	Report		Stadium: Rugby Park; Referee: Tom Wharton

7 February 1970	Motherwell	3–1	Inverness Caledonian	Motherwell
	Deans; McInally pen'	Report	Johnston	Stadium: Fir Park

11 February 1970	Aberdeen	2–1	Clydebank	Aberdeen
	Forrest 5'; Robb 32'	Report	McGhee 11'	Stadium: Pittodrie Stadium; Attendance: 13,082; Referee: R K Wilson

== Quarter-finals ==
21 February 1970	Celtic	3–1	Rangers	Glasgow
	Lennox 39'; Hay 87'; Johnstone 89'	Report	Craig 5' (o.g.)	Stadium: Celtic Park; Referee: Tom Wharton

21 February 1970	East Fife	0–1	Dundee	Methil
		Report	Bryce 14'	Stadium: Bayview Park; Referee: R H Davidson

21 February 1970	Falkirk	0–1	Aberdeen	Falkirk
		Report	McKay 72'	Stadium: Brockville Park; Referee: J W Paterson

21 February 1970	Motherwell	0–1	Kilmarnock	Motherwell
		Report	Mathie 68'	Stadium: Fir Park; Referee: W J Mullan

== Semi-finals ==
14 March 1970	Celtic	2–1	Dundee	Hampden Park, Glasgow
	Macari 58'; Lennox 82'	Report	Wallace 64'	Attendance: 64,546; Referee: W J Mullan

14 March 1970	Aberdeen	1–0	Kilmarnock	Muirton Park, Perth
	McKay 21'	Report		Attendance: 25,812; Referee: J W Paterson

== Final ==
11 April 1970

Aberdeen	3–1	Celtic
Harper 27' (pen.); McKay 83' 90'	Report	Lennox 89'

Hampden Park, Glasgow
Attendance: 108,434
Referee: Bobby Davidson

== See also ==
- 1969–70 in Scottish football
- 1969–70 Scottish League Cup
