= Davie Swan =

Scottish footballer (born 1949)

Personal information
- Full name: Davie Swan
- Date of birth: 3 February 1949 (age 77)
- Place of birth: Edinburgh, Scotland
- Position: Left-back

Youth career
- –1965: Edina Hearts

Senior career*
Years	Team	Apps	(Gls)
1965–1970	Dundee	44	(0)
1970–1971	Kilmarnock	2	(0)
1972	Arcadia Shepherds		(0)
1973–1975	Highlands Park		(0)
- * Club domestic league appearances and goals

Davie Swan (born 3 February 1949) is a retired Scottish footballer. He played as a left-back for Dundee throughout the late 1960s and the mid 1970s. He also had a three-year career in South Africa, playing for Arcadia Shepherds and Highlands Park.

== Club career ==
Emerging from Edina Hearts, Swan was signed for Dundee for their 1965–66 season although he would make few appearances throughout his first two seasons with the club to where there as a 21-month long gap in between the 1966–67 season and the following 1966–68 season until his match against Clyde on 25 November. Despite beginning to appear more often within the season, by December of 1967, he found himself injured with a twisted ankle and had to miss out on even more matchdays. By the time he recovered, Swan was primarily used as a substitute throughout the remainder of the season. The following 1968–69 season saw Swan briefly be a part of the Starting XI where he and Doug Houston would make remarkable impressions. However, Swan was later replaced with Davie Johnston which led to Swan openly declaring is interest in playing for another club.However, the club's mediocre performance during the 1967–68 season and lack of appearances led to Swan begin to openly express interest in leaving the club. His wish was achieved by the 1969–70 season where he would be allowed to transfer to a different club by the end of the season.

Eventually, Swan would be signed with Kilmarnock for their 1970–71 season. However, Swan was once again injured in his debut game for Kilmarnock against St Mirren on 20 August for the 1970–71 Scottish League Cup. His stint with Kilmarnock was further stifled when he was given a 14-day suspension on 1 September. Seeing a lack of opportunities in Scotland, he chose to play abroad in South Africa for Arcadia Shepherds in 1972. He later signed with Highlands Park for the remainder of his career as he never found a chance to return to play for another Scottish club, retiring in 1975.
