= Dundee F.C. in European football =

Scottish club in European football

Dundee in European football
- Club: Dundee
- First entry: 1962–63 European Cup
- Latest entry: 2003–04 UEFA Cup

Titles
- Champions League: 0 (Best: Semi-finals)
- Europa League: 0 (Best: Third round)
- Cup Winners' Cup: 0 (Best: Second round)

Dundee Football Club is a Scottish association football club based in the city of Dundee. The club first competed in a European competition in 1962–63, entering the European Cup as champions of Scotland. The club reached the semi-finals on its first attempt, which remains the club's best run in a UEFA competition.

== Matches ==
List of Dundee games in European competitions
Season	Competition	Round	Opponent	Home	Away	Other	Agg.	(Note: Round or group progressed or eliminated)	Notes	Ref
1962–63	European Cup	PR	(West Germany) 1. FC Köln	8–1	0–4	—	8–5		—	
1962–63	European Cup	1R	(Portugal) Sporting CP	4–1	0–1	—	4–2		—	
1962–63	European Cup	QF	(Belgium) RSC Anderlecht	2–1	4–1	—	6–2		—	
1962–63	European Cup	SF	(Italy) Milan	1–0	1–5	—	2–5		—	
1964–65	Cup Winners' Cup	2R	(Spain) Real Zaragoza	2–2	1–2	—	3–4		—	
1967–68	Fairs Cup	1R	(Netherlands) DWS	3–0	1–2	—	4–2		—	
1967–68	Fairs Cup	2R	(Belgium) RFC Liégeois	3–1	4–1	—	7–2		—	
1967–68	Fairs Cup	QF	(Switzerland) FC Zürich	1–0	1–0	—	2–0		—	
1967–68	Fairs Cup	SF	(England) Leeds United	1–1	0–1	—	1–2		—	
1971–72	UEFA Cup	1R	(Denmark) AB	4–2	1–0	—	5–2		—	
1971–72	UEFA Cup	2R	(West Germany) 1. FC Köln	4–2	1–2	—	5–4		—	
1971–72	UEFA Cup	3R	(Italy) Milan	2–0	0–3	—	2–3		—	
1973–74	UEFA Cup	1R	(Netherlands) Twente	1–3	2–4	—	3–7		—	
1974–75	UEFA Cup	1R	(Belgium) RDC Molenbeek	2–4	0–1	—	2–5		—	
2001–02	Intertoto Cup	1R	(Serbia and Montenegro) Sartid	0–0	2–5	—	2–5		—	
2003–04	UEFA Cup	QR	(Albania) Vllaznia Shkodër	4–0	2–0	—	6–0		—	
2003–04	UEFA Cup	1R	(Italy) Perugia	1–2	0–1	—	1–3		—	

== Overall record ==
=== By competition ===
Competition	P	W	D	L	GF	GA	GD
European Cup / UEFA Champions League	8	5	0	3	20	14	+6
UEFA Cup / UEFA Europa League	14	6	0	8	24	24	0
UEFA Cup Winners' Cup	2	0	1	1	3	4	-1
UEFA Intertoto Cup	2	0	1	1	2	5	-3
Inter-Cities Fairs Cup	8	5	1	2	14	6	+8
Total	34	16	3	15	63	53	+16

=== By country ===
Country	Pld	W	D	L	GF	GA	GD	Win%	Ref
Albania	2	2	0	0	6	0	+6	100.00	
Belgium	6	4	0	2	15	9	+6	66.67	
Denmark	2	2	0	0	5	2	+3	100.00	
England	2	0	1	1	1	2	−1	0.00	
Germany / West Germany	4	2	0	2	13	9	+4	50.00	
Italy	6	2	0	4	5	11	−6	33.33	
Netherlands	4	1	0	3	7	9	−2	25.00	
Portugal	2	1	0	1	4	2	+2	50.00	
Serbia and Montenegro	2	0	1	1	2	5	−3	0.00	
Spain	2	0	1	1	3	4	−1	0.00	
Switzerland	2	2	0	0	2	0	+2	100.00	
