= 1970 Scottish Cup final =

1970 Scottish Cup Final
- Event: 1969–70 Scottish Cup
Aberdeen	Celtic
3	1
- Date: 11 April 1970
- Venue: Hampden Park, Glasgow
- Referee: Bobby Davidson
- Attendance: 108,434

The 1970 Scottish Cup Final was played on 11 April 1970 at Hampden Park in Glasgow and was the final of the 85th Scottish Cup. Aberdeen and Celtic contested the match, Aberdeen won the match 3–1 with a goal from Joe Harper and two from Derek McKay.

== Road to Hampden Park ==
Home teams listed first.

=== Aberdeen ===
First Round: Aberdeen 4–0 Clyde

Second Round: Aberdeen 2–1 Clydebank

Quarter Final: Falkirk 0–1 Aberdeen

Semi-final: Aberdeen 1-0 Kilmarnock (at Muirton Park, Perth)

=== Celtic ===
First Round: Celtic 2–1 Dunfermline Athletic

Second Round: Celtic 4–0 Dundee United

Quarter Final: Celtic 3-1 Rangers

Semi-final: Celtic 2-1 Dundee (at Hampden Park, Glasgow)

== Match details ==
11 April 1970

Aberdeen	3 – 1	Celtic
Harper 27' (pen.); McKay 83', 90'	Report	Lennox 89'

Hampden Park, Glasgow
Attendance: 108,434
Referee: Bobby Davidson

ABERDEEN:
GK	(Scotland) Bobby Clark
DF	(Denmark) Henning Boel
DF	(Scotland) Tommy McMillan
DF	(Scotland) Martin Buchan (c)
DF	(Scotland) Jim Hermiston
MF	(Scotland) Derek McKay
MF	(Scotland) George Murray
MF	(Scotland) Davie Robb
MF	(Scotland) Arthur Graham
FW	(Scotland) Jim Forrest
FW	(Scotland) Joe Harper
Substitutes:
FW	(Scotland) George Buchan
Manager:
(Scotland) Eddie Turnbull

CELTIC:
GK	(Scotland) Evan Williams
DF	(Scotland) David Hay
DF	(Scotland) Billy McNeill (c)
DF	(Scotland) Jim Brogan
DF	(Scotland) Tommy Gemmell
MF	(Scotland) Jimmy Johnstone
MF	(Scotland) Bobby Murdoch
MF	(Scotland) Bobby Lennox
MF	(Scotland) John Hughes	Substituted off
FW	(Scotland) George Connelly
FW	(Scotland) Willie Wallace
Substitutes:
MF	(Scotland) Bertie Auld	Substituted on
Manager:
(Scotland) Jock Stein
