= Steve Murray (footballer) =

Scottish footballer and manager (born 1944)

Personal information
- Date of birth: 9 October 1944 (age 82)
- Place of birth: Dumbarton, Scotland
- Position: Midfielder

Youth career
- St Patrick's Dumbarton

Senior career*
Years	Team	Apps	(Gls)
1963–1969	Dundee	179	(17)
1969–1973	Aberdeen	101	(20)
1973–1976	Celtic	62	(11)
1979–1980	Dundee United	3	(0)
Total		345	(48)

International career
1971	Scotland	1	(0)

Managerial career
- 1980: Forfar Athletic
- 1982: Montrose
- * Club domestic league appearances and goals

Steve Murray (born 9 October 1944) is a Scottish former footballer who played as a midfielder. He spent the majority of his career in the north-east of Scotland, with Dundee and Aberdeen. Murray also enjoyed success with Glasgow club Celtic and represented Scotland once. He later managed Forfar Athletic and Montrose.

== Playing career ==
Murray began his career in the early 1960s with Dundee, spending six years at Dens Park and picking up runners-up medals in both domestic cup competitions, making around 200 appearances in total.

In 1970, he became Aberdeen's record signing in a £50,000 deal, missing the 1970 Scottish Cup final due to being cup-tied but winning a solitary Scotland cap in 1971, coincidentally in a fixture played at Pittodrie. Following Martin Buchan's departure to Manchester United, Murray became captain.

He moved to Celtic in a £55,000 deal in May 1973 after a contractual disagreement. Murray won all three domestic competitions during his two years at Celtic Park, retiring due to a toe injury in early 1976.

Murray joined Dundee United in 1979 as a scout but after having acupuncture treatment was able to resume his playing career and made three league appearances, also appearing as a substitute in the first game of the Scottish League Cup final that season.

== Management ==
In 1980, Murray began his managerial career with Forfar Athletic, but resigned one training session and three days later. He returned to management two years later with Montrose; however he left to pursue a career in banking.

Murray then returned to former club Dundee United as assistant manager in July 1989. However he had a fall-out with then manager Jim McLean (a teammate in the 1967 Scottish League Cup final). Murray left before the end of the year, later winning a "substantial sum" in a court action.

== Family ==
Murray, whose son Chris was a youth player at Dundee United, Celtic and had coaching spells with Dundee and Brechin City, has now retired from banking and now concentrates on his painting.

== Career statistics ==
=== Club ===
Appearances and goals by club, season and competition
Club	Season	League			Scottish Cup		League Cup		Europe		Total	
Club	Season	Division	Apps	Goals	Apps	Goals	Apps	Goals	Apps	Goals	Apps	Goals
Dundee	1963–64	Scottish Division One	2	0	0	0	0	0	0	0	2	0
Dundee	1964–65	Scottish Division One	23	5	0	0	2	0	2	1	27	6
Dundee	1965–66	Scottish Division One	33	8	2	0	6	1	0	0	41	9
Dundee	1966–67	Scottish Division One	32	1	1	0	6	0	0	0	39	1
Dundee	1967–68	Scottish Division One	33	0	3	0	10	1	8	0	54	1
Dundee	1968–69	Scottish Division One	31	1	1	0	8	0	0	0	40	1
Dundee	1969–70	Scottish Division One	25	2	3	0	6	0	0	0	34	2
Dundee	Total		179	17	10	0	38	2	10	1	237	20
Aberdeen	1969–70	Scottish Division One	7	0	0	0	0	0	0	0	7	0
Aberdeen	1970–71	Scottish Division One	33	6	4	0	5	1	2	2	44	9
Aberdeen	1971–72	Scottish Division One	32	10	3	0	6	0	4	0	45	10
Aberdeen	1972–73	Scottish Division One	29	4	3	1	11	0	1	1	44	6
Aberdeen	Total		101	20	10	1	22	1	7	3	140	25
Celtic	1973–74	Scottish Division One	32	3	5	3	12	2	8	1	57	9
Celtic	1974–75	Scottish Division One	28	8	3	1	8	3	2	0	41	12
Celtic	1975–76	Scottish Premier Division	2	0	0	0	0	0	0	0	2	0
Celtic	Total		62	11	8	4	20	5	10	1	100	21
Dundee United	1979–80	Scottish Premier Division	3	0	0	0	2	0	0	0	5	0
Career total			345	48	28	5	82	8	27	5	482	66

=== International ===
Appearances and goals by national team and year
National team	Year	Apps	Goals
Scotland	1971	1	0
Total		1	0

== Managerial record ==
Team	From	To	Record				
Team	From	To	P	W	L	D	Win %
Forfar Athletic	1980	1980	1	1	0	0	100.00%
Montrose	1982	1983	29	9	12	8	31.03%
Total			30	10	12	8	35.00%

== Honours ==
Dundee

- Scottish Cup Runner-up: 1

1963–64

- Scottish League Cup Runner-up: 1

1967–68

Celtic

- Scottish League Division One: 1

1973–74

- Scottish Cup: 2

1973–74, 1974–75

- Scottish League Cup: 1

1974–75

Dundee United

- Scottish League Cup: 1

1979–80
