= Reuben Bennett =

Scottish footballer & manager (1913–1989)

- Born: 21 December 1913
- Died: 14 December 1989 (aged 75)
- Occupation: professional footballer

Reuben Bennett (21 December 1913 – 14 December 1989) was a Scottish professional football player and manager who played as a goalkeeper for Hull City, Queen of the South, Dundee and Elgin City. He was then manager of Ayr United and a founding member of the Boot Room coaching staff at Liverpool.

== Player ==
In Bennett's playing days, he was a goalkeeper with Hull City and Dumfries club Queen of the South. After his war service, he joined Dundee where in three seasons from 1946 to 1949, he made 21 league appearances. Among his Dundee club mates was Bobby Ancell. Bennett then moved to Elgin City.

== Manager and trainer ==
After retiring as a player, he was manager with Ayr United from May 1953 to 9 April 1955. Coaching was his strength but he was not cut out for management and the 1954–1955 season was punctuated by some demoralising results. Despite his two cup quarter final places, his team also squandered two good promotion chances after mediocre league performances and he left as manager in April 1955. After resigning, he later became assistant trainer for Bobby Ancell at Motherwell then trainer at Third Lanark.

Bennett joined Liverpool's coaching staff when Phil Taylor was team manager. However Taylor resigned on 17 November 1959. In December Taylor's replacement was announced as Bill Shankly who immediately set about rejuvenating the club with relish. Shankly arrived at a decayed club in stagnation but recognised the strength of the existing coaching staff of Bennett, Bob Paisley and Joe Fagan. Shankly elected to retain all three with Bennett staying on board until 1986. Shankly started holding his coaches meetings in the Anfield boot room. In this informal environment, between them they discussed tactics and plans. Thus the management philosophy behind Liverpool's success over the next three decades was born. A fitness fanatic, at Liverpool Bennett was entrusted by Shankly with responsibility for player training and physical condition.

Shankly signed Ian St. John from Bennett's former club Motherwell and Ron Yeats from Dundee United after the season's end in 1961. Yeats was immediately installed as captain. Liverpool were emphatic winners of the Second Division title (then the second tier of English domestic football) in 1962 by eight points. In the top division they were champions in 1964 and 1966 as well as winners of the FA Cup in 1965. In Europe, Liverpool reached the European Cup semi-final in 1965 (losing to the eventual winner Inter Milan) and European Cup Winners' Cup final in 1966 (losing to Borussia Dortmund after extra time at Hampden Park in Bennett's native Scotland).

A string of domestic and European trophies were then captured in the 1970s and 1980s. Bennett's retirement in 1986, at the age of 72, came in the year that Liverpool won the double in their first season under the management of Kenny Dalglish. He had served under five managers—Phil Taylor, Bill Shankly, Bob Paisley, Joe Fagan and Kenny Dalglish—in 30 years at Anfield.

Bennett, who died in December 1989 at the age of 75, is the only one of the original Anfield boot room quartet who did not manage Liverpool at some point during his career.
