= George Stuart =

George Stuart may refer to:

- George Harold Stuart (1870–1951), British trade unionist
- George Okill Stuart Jr. (1807–1884), Quebec lawyer, judge and political figure
- George Okill Stuart (1776–1862), Anglican clergyman and educator
- George S. Stuart (born 1929), American sculptor, raconteur and historian
- George R. C. Stuart (1924–2008), American attorney and politician
- Lord George Stuart (1780–1841), Royal Navy officer
- George Stuart (classicist) (1715–1793), professor of humanities at the University of Edinburgh and joint founder of the Royal Society of Edinburgh
- George L. Stuart Jr., former state senator from Orlando

== See also ==
- George Steuart (disambiguation)
- George Stewart (disambiguation)
