= George Steuart =

George Steuart may refer to:

- George Steuart (architect) (1730–1806), Scottish architect
- George H. Steuart (brigadier general) (1828–1903), American Civil War general
- George H. Steuart (militia general) (1790–1867), militia general who saw action in the War of 1812
- George H. Steuart (politician) (1700–1784), Maryland politician and planter
- George H. Steuart (diplomat) (1907–1998), one of the last consuls of the United States at Liverpool, England
- George H. Steuart (physician) (1865–1945), physician from Maryland

== Company ==
- George Steuart Group, Sri Lanka's oldest commerce establishment

== See also ==
- George Steuart Hume (1747–1788), physician, born George H. Steuart
- George Stuart (disambiguation)
- George Stewart (disambiguation)
