= Tom Stewart (Scottish footballer) =

Scottish footballer

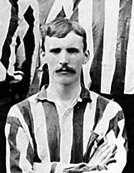

Personal information
- Full name: Thomas Stewart
- Place of birth: Lanarkshire, Scotland
- Position: Full-back

Senior career*
Years	Team	Apps	(Gls)
- Glasgow Perthshire
1894–1895	Third Lanark	1	(0)
1895–1896	Partick Thistle	9	(0)
1896	Motherwell	7	(0)
1896–1898	Newcastle United	27	(0)
1898–1899	Grimsby Town	1	(0)
- * Club domestic league appearances and goals

Thomas Stewart, also known as George Stewart, was a Scottish professional footballer who played as a full-back.
