= George Stewart (New Zealand businessman) =

New Zealand exporter and businessman

George Stewart (1885–1955) was a notable New Zealand wool and fur skin exporter, businessman. He was born in Dunedin, New Zealand in 1885.
