= George Osborne Wauchope Stewart =

George Osborne Wauchope Stewart, JP was a British banker. He was the deputy chief manager of the Hongkong and Shanghai Banking Corporation and became the chairman of the Mercantile Bank of India in 1966 after it was acquired by the Hongkong Bank.

Stewart joined the Hong Kong and Shanghai Banking Corporation in around 1929 and worked for it for forty years. He spent his early career in Shanghai. From 1952 to 1953, he was chief accountant of the Bank, and as such Hong Kong banknotes displayed his signature. Later, he was the deputy chief manager under chief manager Michael Turner.

During Turner's absence in 1961, Stewart was appointed provisionally to the Executive Council of Hong Kong for a brief period of time. Stewart was involved in the Hongkong Bank's takeover of the British Bank of the Middle East in 1959 in order to prevent an American bank taking control, as suggested by London manager S. W. P. Perry-Aldworth. Stewart later sat on the board of the British Bank of the Middle East in which he retired in 1969. He became the chairman of the Mercantile Bank, which was acquired by the Hongkong Bank in 1959, in April 1966.

In 1961, he left Hong Kong for London to take the position of the Manager for Europe. He also succeeded S. W. P. Perry-Aldworth as the chairman of the Chinese Bondholders' Committee in December 1961. He held the position until 1968 when he was succeeded by G. P. Stubbs. In 1964, Stewart was also appointed chairman of the London Committee of the Hongkong and Shanghai Banking Corporation. He was also the vice chairman of China Association.

Stewart retired in 1969.
