= George Stewart (surgeon) =

Irish physician (1752–1813)

- Born: 1752; Drumasple, County Tyrone
- Died: 8 June 1813 (aged 60–61); Dublin
- Occupation: Surgeon
- Years active: from 1773

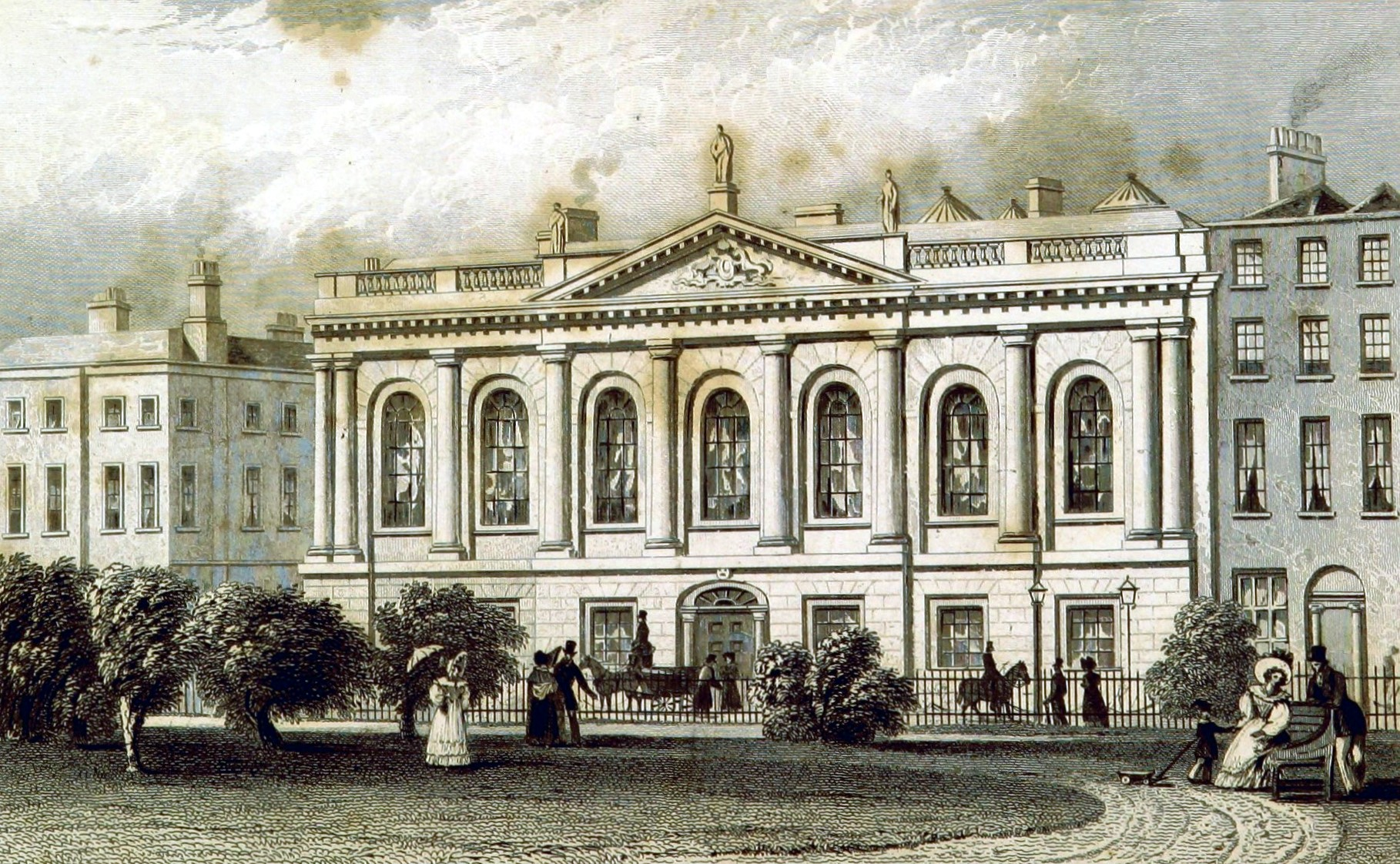
"The College of Surgeons, Dublin". 1837.

George Stewart (1752 – 8 June 1813) was the president of the Royal College of Surgeons in Ireland (RCSI) in 1792 and in 1799.

== Early life and family ==
George Stewart was sixth in descent from the second Lord Ochiltree, who belonged to one of the many branches of the royal family of Stewart, or Stuart. His father, Alexander, resided at Drumasple, in the County of Tyrone, of which county he was high sheriff in 1752. His mother was Jane, daughter of Benjamin Wallace, of Ramelton, County of Donegal; she was Alexander Stewart's second wife. George Stewart was born in his father's house in 1752.

Stewart was twice married; firstly to Frances Anne, daughter of William Stewart, of Killymoon, County of Tyrone, who for some time represented that county in the Irish Parliament; secondly to Elizabeth Mitchell, a Dublin lady.

== Career ==
Stewart began to practise at 11 Fownes Street, Dublin, in 1773, and in the same year he was elected a surgeon to the Charitable Infirmary, Inns Quay, which subsequently was removed to Jervis Street. Soon after Stewart moved to South George's Street, and at the date of the foundation of the college he resided at 32 Mary Street. He again changed his residence to 74 Stephen Street, and the latter portion of his life was spent in a fine mansion in Upper Merrion Street.

Stewart being well connected, having agreeable manners and much surgical skill, soon acquired an extensive practice amongst the upper classes. In 1785 he was appointed state surgeon, and on Richardson's death, in 1787, he succeeded that surgeon in the position of surgeon-general to the forces.

== Death and legacy ==
He died at his house, 19 Upper Merrion Street, on 8 June 1813. On 21 June 1813, the Royal College of Surgeons in Ireland, on the motion of Abraham Colles, resolved to help to perpetuate his memory by placing a marble bust of him in their principal hall.
