= George Neil Stewart =

Scottish-Canadian doctor

Professor George Neil Stewart
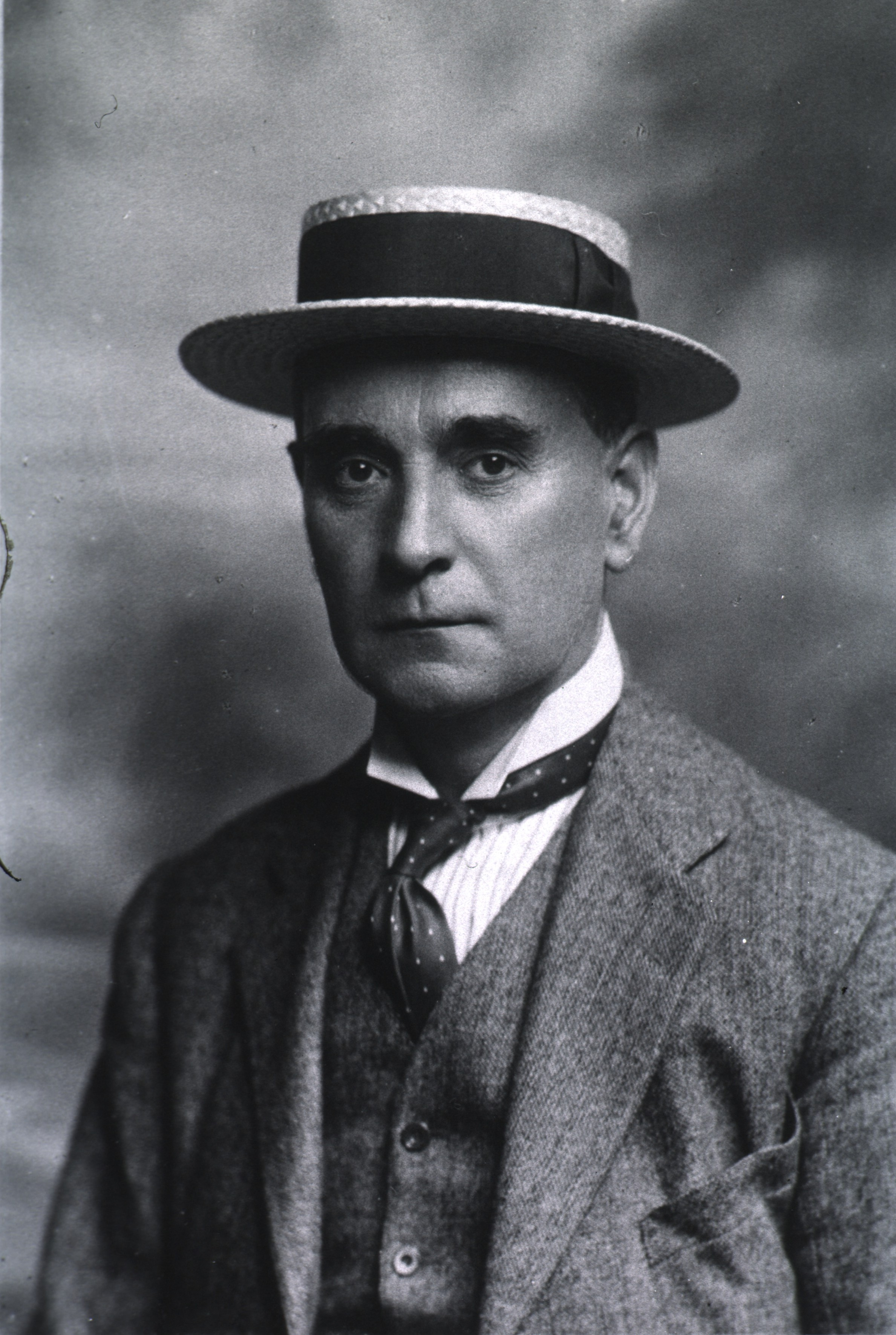
- Born: 18 April 1860; London, Canada West
- Died: 28 May 1930 (aged 70); Cleveland, Ohio
- Education: University of Edinburgh
- Known for: Physiology
- Spouse: Louise Kate Powell

George Neil Stewart (18 April 1860 – 28 May 1930) was a Scottish-Canadian medical doctor who made a major contribution to teaching and research in physiology.

== Early life ==
George Neil Stewart was born in Canada at London, Canada West, the son of James Innes and Catherine Sutherland Stewart. His parents returned to Scotland and he grew up in Lybster in Caithness. He studied at the University of Edinburgh starting in 1879, graduating M.A. in 1883 with honours in Mathematics before progressing to study Medicine. He was Mackay Smith scholar in 1883–1884. Eminent professors from whom he learned included Peter Guthrie Tait, with whom he took up an assistantship in 1879, and William Rutherford, from whom he learned physiology. To pursue these interests further, in 1886–1887 he went to Berlin to study with Emil du Bois-Reymond. He received further qualifications at Edinburgh, receiving his B.Sc in 1886, D.Sc in 1887, M.B., C.M. in 1889, and finally his M.D. in 1891, winning the gold medal for his graduation thesis, The influence of temperature and of endocardiac pressure on the heart, and particularly on the action of the vagus and cardiac sympathetic nerves. Additionally, in 1892 he submitted an essay for the Goodsir Memorial Prize, Researches on the circulation time in organs and on the influences which affect it.

== Early career ==
Following his D.Sc, Stewart became senior demonstrator of physiology at Owens College, Victoria University, Manchester (1887–1889), where he learned from William Stirling the value of the illustrative experiment in teaching science. He then became a George Henry Lewes student at Downing College, Cambridge (1889–1893), receiving his D.P.H. in 1890. He acted as examiner in physiology at Aberdeen (1890–1894) and spent time in Strasbourg in 1892.

== American career ==
In 1893, Stewart went to Harvard University as instructor in physiology following an invitation from Henry P. Bowditch. In 1894 he was appointed professor of physiology and histology at Western Reserve University School of Medicine, in Cleveland, Ohio, where he remained with the exception of the years 1903–1907 during which he was professor of physiology at the University of Chicago. In 1907 he became professor of experimental medicine and director of the H.K. Cushing Laboratory of Experimental Medicine; he was also clinical physiologist to Lakeside Hospital, Cleveland.

== Research and publications ==
At Cleveland, using improvised laboratory equipment, Stewart began illustrating lectures with experiments. This inspired his 796-page Manual of Physiology (1895), the first work of its kind to include practical exercises for students. The practice spread and the Manual became a standard text, going into 8 editions by 1918.

After earlier work on color vision, electrophysiology, Talbot's law, cardiac nerves, otoliths, muscle proteins, and permeability of blood corpuscles, Stewart

later experimentally investigated such clinical problems as the effect of total anemia on the brain, resuscitation, the measurement of blood flow by the calorimetric method, and the estimation of pulmonary blood capacity and cardiac output by indicator-dilution techniques. With Julius M. Rogoff he studied the functions of the adrenal medulla and cortex, including the epinephrine output and the usefulness of cortex extracts to treat Addison's disease. They discovered that the adrenal cortex was indispensable to the life of higher animals. Stewart published a series of papers on "The liberation of epinephrin from the adrenals" in the Journal of Pharmacology and Experimental Therapeutics.

Stewart was a member of the Physiology Society, American Physiology Society, American Pharmacology Society. The University of Edinburgh awarded him the honorary L.L.D. in 1920.

== Later life ==
Stewart was described as a brilliant teacher, witty, and possessed of prodigious energy and an amazing memory. In later life he suffered from pernicious anemia and progressive spinal degeneration, but he remained mentally alert until the end and made notes about his own condition. Stewart married Louise Kate Powell on 20 September 1906, and his wife and four children were living in Toronto at the time of his death. His funeral was held at the University Chapel at Cleveland on 31 May 1930; his body was cremated and his ashes taken to Toronto. His life was summarised in obituaries of the time in Nature, Science and (with some inaccuracies) in the British Medical Journal.
