= Alex Kinninmonth =

Scottish footballer (1941–2024)

Alexander Kinninmonth (26 September 1941 – 8 August 2024) was a Scottish footballer who played as a midfielder.

== Career ==
Kinninmonth started his career with Dundee making 129 league appearances over an eight-year spell before moving to Dunfermline Athletic where he served as club captain and then rounded off his career with a brief stint with Forfar Athletic.

Kinninmonth died on 8 August 2024, at the age of 82.
