= Ron Selway =

Scottish footballer (1944–2025)

- Selway in 1969

Personal information
- Full name: Ronald Alexander Selway
- Date of birth: 19 March 1946
- Place of birth: Dundee, Angus, Scotland
- Date of death: 26 October 2024 (aged 78)
- Place of death: Forfar, Angus, Scotland
- Height: 1.80 m (5 ft 11 in)
- Position: Centre-half

Youth career
- 1959–1964: Boys' Brigade

Senior career*
Years	Team	Apps	(Gls)
1965–1966	Preston North End		(0)
1966–1972	Dundee	81	(0)
1972–1974	Raith Rovers		(0)
- * Club domestic league appearances and goals

Ronald "Ron" Alexander Selway (19 March 1946 – 26 October 2024) was a Scottish footballer. He played as a centre-half for Dundee throughout the late 1960s and the early 1970s.

== Career ==
Selway was born on 19 March 1946 at Dundee. He began his career within the youth ranks of the Boys' Brigade football team in 1959 based in Wallacetown Church in Dundee. He would later make his professional debut with Preston North End in the 1965–66 season in where despite breaking one of his legs during training with the club, the club would keep him for the season. He would then make his debut for Dundee beginning in the 1966 season. His first major campaign with the club would be through Dundee's run at the 1967–68 Inter-Cities Fairs Cup where they would reach the semifinals, losing out to Leeds United. During the 1969–70 Dundee F.C. season, Aberdeen would briefly have interest in potentially signing Selway to play for their club. This would also be the season in where Selway would predominantly partner up with Doug Houston during games. At the beginning of the 1970–71 season, Selway would initially be injured before returning in time to play in the 2–1 victory against Ayr United on 11 August 1970 for the 1970–71 Scottish League Cup. He would also return for consistent participation within the club following a relative absence from the starting XI of the club. During a 3–0 defeat to Celtic on 26 September, following a prior foul by Celtic forward Lou Macari, Selway reacted violently to the point of being expulsed from the match. He would later be one of the few prevailing players in the 1–3 defeat against Clyde on 28 November.

He would later be unavailable for a few weeks following general poor performance by the club throughout the season as well as leg injuries inhibiting his performance. He would later return following an ankle injury during training, returning alongside club captain Houston. His subsequent season with the club wouldn't be nearly as consistent as his preceding season as he would play as a substitute for George Stewart. His participation would be further hampered as a flu outbreak would occur in November 1971 which left both Selway and Stewart unable to play and cause Selway to miss out on his participation in the inaugural 1971–72 UEFA Cup third round first leg match against AC Milan that would later end in a 3–0 defeat.

Selway would later be released by Dundee at the end of the 1971–72 season as he would soon sign with Raith Rovers as the first signing of a project by club manager George Farm to strengthen the club as he would later be joined by Joe Baker of Hibernian and Billy McLaren of East Fife. Despite initial success within the club, only Selway and Tom Brown would particularly stand out amongst the starting XI for the club by October 1972. Selway was then infected with another flu outbreak in January 1973 alongside his teammates Roddy Georgeson, Peter Donaldson and Donald Urquhart before being able to fully play once more by February 1973. This period of activity wouldn't last long as he would be injured within two minutes during a 2–0 victory against Clydebank on 28 February. This was around the time Selway would fully commit to playing as a centre-half as he would later contribute to the 1–4 victory against Stranraer alongside Cooper and Donaldson.

However, he soon faced his ankle injuries and was forced to stop playing in order to recover in early April. Following his recovery for the 1973–74 Scottish Division Two, he would score an own goal during the inaugural game of the 1973–74 Drybrough Cup against his old club Dundee on 29 July after an unexpected kick by right-back Billy Brown that bounced off of Selway's shoulder. His performance throughout the season would be considerably worse compared to his previous season through a combination of bad chemistry with other defenders such as Brown and Brian Cooper as well as general exhaustion. His prone to injuries were also beginning to get considerably worse as he would be injured at least once a month. This would force him to retire from his football career prematurely in February 1974 following his persistent leg injury at the age of 27.

== Later life ==
Selway got married at some point and had a daughter: Debbie. He died on 26 October 2024 from natural causes at the Finavon Court Care Home at Forfar.
