= Joe Gilroy =

Scottish footballer

Personal information
- Full name: Joseph Gilroy
- Date of birth: 19 October 1940 (age 86)
- Place of birth: Glasgow, Scotland
- Position: Forward

Youth career
- Balfron

Senior career*
Years	Team	Apps	(Gls)
1958–1960	Queen's Park	4	(0)
1963–1964	Montrose	31	(6)
1964–1967	Clyde	106	(44)
1967–1969	Fulham	24	(8)
1969–1971	Dundee	52	(13)
1971–1974	Highlands Park	62	(24)
Total		279	(95)

Managerial career
- Valur
- 1975–1976: Morton
- 1976–1979: Queen's Park
- Brisbane Lions
- Brisbane City
- * Club domestic league appearances and goals

Joseph Gilroy (born 19 October 1941) is a Scottish former football forward.

Joe Gilroy began his career with Queens Park, where at 16 years old he made 8 appearances alongside Sir Alex Ferguson. He studied at The Scottish School of Physical Education with Craig Brown and Andy Roxburgh. During this time he gained his full SFA coaching badge and was a staff coach in 1963. That year he signed for Montrose to play alongside Gordon Wallace.

Gilroy then joined Clyde managed by John Prentice, playing with Jim McLean, Harry Hood and Davie White and 44 goals in 106 games saw him sign for Fulham where he joined Johnny Haynes, George Cohen and Allan Clark. John Prentice signed Gilroy for Dundee to again link up with Gordon Wallace and Jim McLean. After three seasons he joined Highlands Park in South Africa to help win the league and the National Castle Cup. Returning to Scotland he was appointed coach of Falkirk with John Prentice as Manager. Gilroy then managed Valur in Iceland, Morton and Queen's Park before emigrating to Australia. There he managed Brisbane Lions and Brisbane City in the National League then coached the Queensland Team until 1997.

== Honours ==
Player

- Highlands Park
- NFL Championship: Runners-up: 1973
- NFL Cup: 1973

Manager

- Brisbane Lions
- NSL Cup: 1981

Individual

- Clyde FC Hall of Fame: 2014 Inductee
  Inducted as part of the 1966–67 Clyde squad.
