= Derek McKay =

Scottish footballer

Personal information
- Date of birth: 13 December 1948
- Place of birth: Banff, Scotland
- Date of death: 20 April 2008 (aged 59)
- Place of death: Bangkok, Thailand
- Height: 5 ft 8 in (1.73 m)
- Position: Right winger

Senior career*
Years	Team	Apps	(Gls)
1966–1969	Dundee	13	(1)
1969–1971	Aberdeen	15	(0)
1971	Crystal Palace	0	(0)
1971–1972	Barrow	18	(0)
Total		46	(1)
- * Club domestic league appearances and goals

Derek McKay (13 December 1948 – 20 April 2008) was a Scottish footballer who played as a right winger.

== Biography ==
Derek McKay was born in Banff, Aberdeenshire, on the Moray Firth Coast. McKay began his career with his local Banff based, part-time professional club, Deveronvale FC of the Scottish Highland Football League.

As an 18-year-old McKay transferred to Scottish First Division Football League Club, Dundee FC. He featured in a dozen Dundee league matches.

He next moved to Aberdeen in 1969. In the 1969–70 Scottish Cup his career reached its zenith. McKay scored the winning goals in the quarter- and semi-final matches, before scoring twice in the 3-1 Final win over favourites Celtic. Known afterwards as 'Cup-tie McKay', he left Pittodrie just three matches later after a row over bonuses for the Cup Final.

He next had brief spells in England with Crystal Palace and Barrow.

McKay moved back into the Highland Football League with short spells at Elgin City and Buckie Thistle. He then moved abroad to play in South Africa, Hong Kong and Australia where he settled and worked in the Mail Room of a local hospital in Perth.

McKay died on 20 April 2008 from a heart attack while on holiday in Thailand.

== Career statistics ==
Appearances and goals by club, season and competition
Club	Season	League			National Cup		League Cup		Europe		Total	
Club	Season	Division	Apps	Goals	Apps	Goals	Apps	Goals	Apps	Goals	Apps	Goals
Dundee	1966-67	Scottish Division One	9	1	0	0	1	0	0	0	10	1
Dundee	1967-68	Scottish Division One	3	0	0	0	0	0	0	0	3	0
Dundee	1968-69	Scottish Division One	1	0	0	0	1	0	0	0	2	0
Dundee	Total		13	1	0	0	2	0	0	0	15	1
Aberdeen	1969-70	Scottish Division One	13	0	3	4	0	0	0	0	16	4
Aberdeen	1970-71	Scottish Division One	2	0	0	0	0	0	1	0	3	0
Aberdeen	Total		15	0	3	4	0	0	1	0	19	4

== Honours ==
Aberdeen

- Scottish Cup: 1

1969–70
