= George McLean (footballer, born 1943) =

Scottish footballer

Personal information
- Full name: George Tomlinson McLean
- Date of birth: 26 May 1943 (age 83)
- Place of birth: Paisley, Scotland
- Position: Centre forward

Youth career
- Drumchapel Amateur

Senior career*
Years	Team	Apps	(Gls)
1960–1962	St Mirren	45	(11)
1962–1967	Rangers	69	(49)
1967–1969	Dundee	52	(25)
1969–1971	Dunfermline Athletic	45	(23)
1971–1975	Ayr United	93	(32)
1974	→ Vancouver Whitecaps (loan)	19	(5)
1976	Hamilton Academical	1	(0)
Total		324	(145)

International career
1968	Scotland	1	(0)
- * Club domestic league appearances and goals

George Tomlinson McLean (born 26 May 1943) is a Scottish former footballer who played at both professional and international levels as a centre forward.

== Career ==
Born in Paisley, McLean played club football for Drumchapel Amateur, St Mirren, Rangers, Dundee, Dunfermline Athletic, Ayr United, Vancouver Whitecaps and Hamilton Academical.

He earned one international cap for Scotland, in a goalless draw with the Netherlands on 30 May 1968.
