= Jim Steele (footballer) =

Scottish footballer (born 1950)

Personal information
- Full name: James Steele
- Date of birth: 11 March 1950 (age 76)
- Place of birth: Edinburgh, Scotland
- Height: 6 ft 1 in (1.85 m)
- Position: Centre back

Youth career
- 1965–1967: Heart of Midlothian

Senior career*
Years	Team	Apps	(Gls)
1967–1972	Dundee	75	(5)
1972–1977	Southampton	161	(2)
1976	→ Rangers (loan)	5	(0)
1977–1980	Washington Diplomats	71	(2)
1979–1979	Pittsburgh Spirit (indoor)	2	(1)
1980	Memphis Rogues	7	(0)
1980–1981	Chicago Sting (indoor)	15	(8)
1981	Chicago Sting	0	(0)
Total		336	(18)
- * Club domestic league appearances and goals

James Steele (born 11 March 1950) is a Scottish former professional footballer who played as a centre back.

He began his playing career in 1967 at Dundee before moving to Southampton in 1972, with whom he helped to win the 1976 FA Cup. Steele was loaned out to Rangers in 1976. He departed for the United States in 1977 where he would spend the remainder of his career, with spells at Washington Diplomats, Pittsburgh Spirit, Memphis Rogues and Chicago Sting.

== Club career ==
=== Early career ===
Steele was born in Edinburgh; after leaving school, he was a trainee mechanical engineer with the National Coal Board. As a 15-year-old he was playing for a village team in his native Scotland when Tynecastle Boys Club, who were affiliated to Scottish First Division team, Hearts, spotted his talent and signed him up as an apprentice.

=== Dundee ===
Dundee signed him as a 17-year-old and he made his debut in the first team with a solitary appearance in the 1967–68 season against Stirling Albion at Annfield.

The highlight of his Dundee career was in their 1971–72 UEFA Cup run, when Dundee beat German side FC Koln, but went out to AC Milan despite a 2–0 victory in the home leg. These high-profile games brought him to the attention of English clubs and soon Leeds United and Southampton (alerted by their former player and scout, Campbell Forsyth) expressed an interest.

=== Southampton ===
His transfer to English first division club Southampton for a club record fee of £80,000 was shrouded in secrecy as manager Ted Bates moved swiftly to secure Steele's services from under the noses of many bigger clubs. He made his debut for Southampton on 29 January 1972 in a 4–1 victory at home against Nottingham Forest.

The pinnacle of his career came in Southampton's 1976 FA Cup final victory over Manchester United and his performance at the centre of Saints' defence, alongside Mel Blyth, earned him the man of the match award.

After the first few games of the 1976–77 season, he was replaced by Malcolm Waldron and was briefly loaned out to Rangers in November 1976, playing five games, including the Old Firm derby against Celtic but did not fit into Jock Wallace's plans and returned to The Dell. After his return to Southampton, he seemed to have re-established himself in the team being virtually ever-present from mid-December onwards, including appearing in an FA Cup run before Saints were eliminated by the team they had beaten in the previous season's final, Manchester United. He was sent off in the replay on 8 March against United by referee Clive Thomas after a series of bad-tempered exchanges with Jimmy Greenhoff.

On 16 March 1977, Saints were playing Anderlecht in the European Cup-winners' Cup when Jim made a mistake in defence allowing Van der Elst to get past him to score the winning goal. This error, coupled with the sending-off, led to a falling-out with the manager Lawrie McMenemy, who was intent on a wholesale rebuilding of the team in order to gain promotion back to Division 1, and Jim made his final appearance for Saints away to Nottingham Forest on 22 March 1977.

In total he made 201 appearances for Southampton, scoring just two goals.

=== United States ===
In April 1977, he moved to the United States and, although still relatively young, he never played again in British football. He spent three years with Washington Diplomats in the NASL followed by a short spell at Memphis Rogues and the Chicago Sting. He served as player-coach during the 1978 NASL indoor season while head coach Gordon Bradley was away scouting. On 21 September 1979, he signed on loan from the Diplomats with the Pittsburgh Spirit of the Major Indoor Soccer League. He tore the anterior cruciate ligament in his left knee two games into the season. This led to a legal mess in which the Diplomats were considered legal action against the Spirit for the loss of Steele.

The Diplomats then released Steele who considered suing them before signing with the Memphis Rogues on 29 May 1980. In 1981, he signed with the Chicago Sting, but saw no first team games – the knee injury bring an end to his playing career.

== Personal life ==
After retiring from football, he was employed as a foreman at an electrical plant in Washington, before returning to Britain in 1994.

Upon his return, he entered the pub trade and ran two pubs in Southampton before he moved to Cotswolds, where he also became a landlord of a pub. He later returned to live near Southampton and helped run the Eastleigh District Irish Society bar in Eastleigh, Hampshire.

== Honours ==
=== As a player ===
Southampton

- FA Cup: 1975–76
