= Tayside derby =

Scottish football rivalry

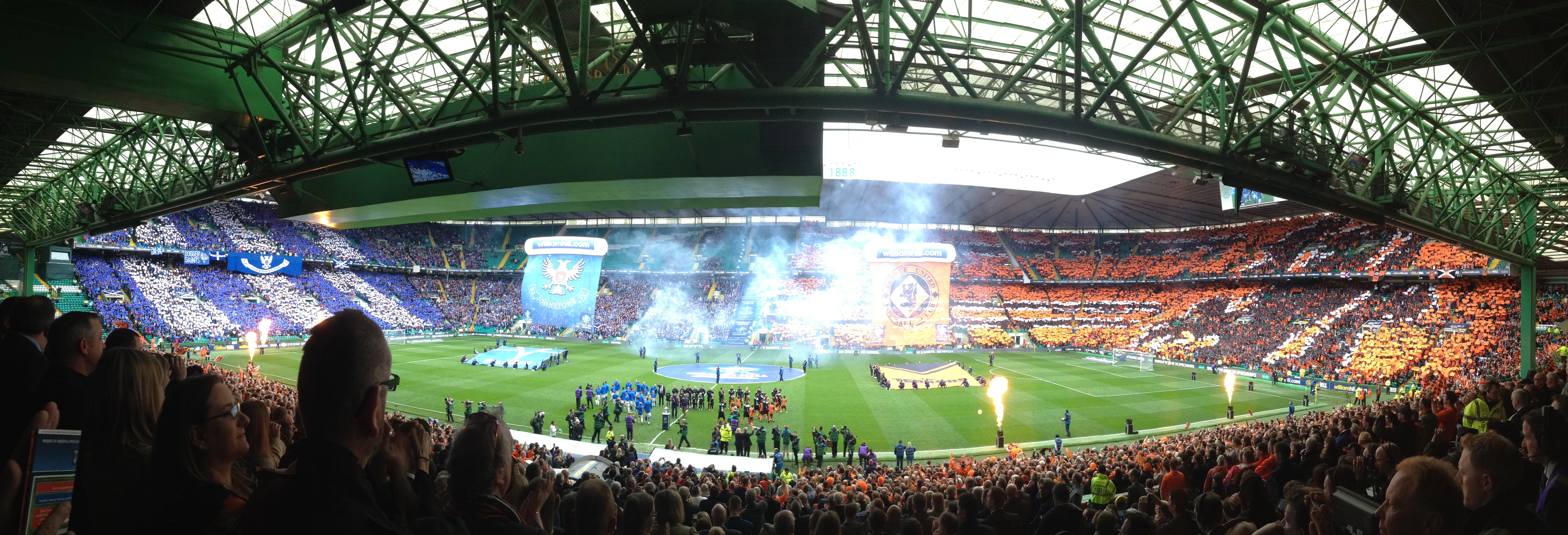
- Banner and card display by fans of St Johnstone (left) and Dundee United (right) at the 2014 Scottish Cup Final
- Location: Tayside, Scotland
- Teams: Dundee; Dundee United; St Johnstone
- First meeting: 23 September 1911; St Johnstone 1–0 Dundee Hibernian; 1911–12 Scottish Division Two
- Stadiums: Dens Park (Dundee); Tannadice Park (Dundee United); McDiarmid Park (St Johnstone)

Statistics
- Total meetings: 543 (January 2026)
- Most wins: Dundee United (158) (Note: Includes fixtures played under the Dundee Hibernian name)
- All-time record: Dundee United (158); Dundee (127); St Johnstone (123); Draw (135)

The Tayside Derby (also known as the Tayside Trifecta) is a football rivalry based in Tayside, Scotland. The matches are contested by the three professional clubs in the region: Dundee, Dundee United and St Johnstone.

A match between Dundee and Dundee United, whose grounds are in the same street, is referred to as a Dundee derby. St Johnstone are based in Perth, 20 miles from Dundee.

In seasons where all local derby matches were traditionally held on the same weekend (including at New Year), the Dundee derby would take precedence if all three clubs were in the same league, and any uneven number of Tayside teams would lead to one usually playing Aberdeen, who had no closer rivals geographically.

Followers of the Dundee clubs generally consider their city rivalry as far more important than any relationship with St Johnstone, with Dundee captain Charlie Adam stating in 2021 prior to a Scottish Cup tie with the Saints that there was no such thing as a Tayside derby; opposing goalkeeper Zander Clark did not refute this outright but highlighted the increased travelling support typically brought to each ground for matches due to the close distance between Perth and Dundee, bringing more local interest into league fixtures particularly in seasons where the Dundee clubs are in different divisions and no city derbies are played.

== Achievements ==
Between them, the three clubs have won thirteen major trophies (as well as finishing runners-up/beaten finalists 26 times across the three competitions), with St Johnstone's three triumphs all the most recent, but they are still behind the Dundee clubs who have each won four cups and one national league championship.

In the season following their title wins, the Dundee clubs each progressed to the semi-final stage of the European Cup (Dundee in 1962–63, United in 1983–84). Dundee also reached the semi-finals of the 1967–68 Inter-Cities Fairs Cup, while Dundee United were runners-up in the 1987 UEFA Cup Final. St Johnstone have never made a major impact in European football, although they qualified for Europe six times between 2014 and 2021, more than either Dundee club managed in the 21st century.

All three clubs have endured spells in the second tier, but St Johnstone are the only club to have dropped into the third tier for a short period. Between them, they have won the second tier championship 14 times, and have lifted the minor Scottish Challenge Cup on four occasions up to 2017–18.

=== Achievements by Tayside clubs ===
Up to and including season 2024–25.

Club	Top tier seasons	Scottish League (level 1)			Scottish League (level 2)		Scottish League (level 3)		Scottish Cup		League Cup		Challenge Cup	
Club	Top tier seasons	W	RU	3rd	W	RU	W	RU	W	RU	W	RU	W	RU
Dundee United	63	1	0	8	4	4	0	0	2	8	2	5	1	1
Dundee	100	1	4	1	6	5	0	0	1	4	3	3	2	1
St Johnstone	54	0	0	3	7	3	0	1	2	0	1	2	1	1

== Dundee United vs St Johnstone ==
- First meeting: 23 September 1911, 1911–12 Scottish Division Two
- Next meeting: To be confirmed.

By far the most famous meeting between the Terrors and the Saints was the 2014 Scottish Cup Final at Celtic Park, won 2–0 by St Johnstone to secure the first major trophy in their long history.

In 1991, the clubs met in the semi-final stage of the same tournament, Dundee United winning that match at East End Park to set up a final against Motherwell which they lost 4–3 after extra time.

=== Results table ===
As of: 12 April 2025.

Competition (Note: Does not include unofficial wartime competitions, or regional tournaments like the Forfarshire Cup.)	GP	DUT	Dr	STJ	DUTG	STJG
League (Note: Includes matches in different divisions, and from the different eras: SFL, SPL, SPFL)	162	61	43	58	227	222
Scottish Cup	4	2	0	2	6	7
League Cup	17	12	3	2	43	24
Total	183	75	46	62	276	253

== Dundee vs St Johnstone ==
- First meeting: 4 October 1924, 1924–25 Scottish Division One
- Next meeting: To be confirmed.

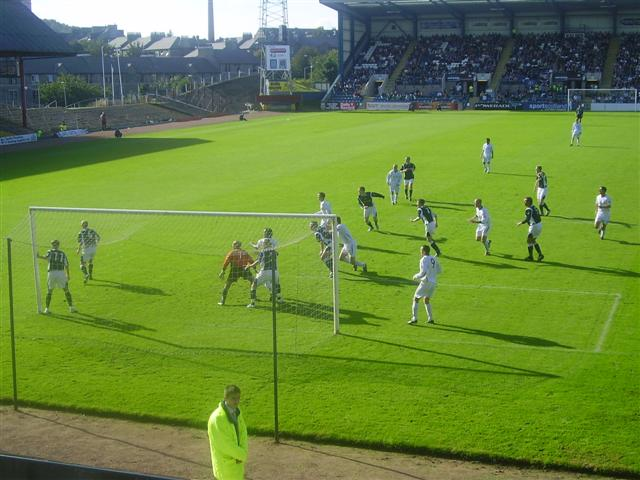
Dundee host St Johnstone at Dens Park, 2006

The two clubs met in the semi-final of the 1967–68 Scottish League Cup at Tannadice. Dundee won 3–1, but went on to lose the final to Celtic. St Johnstone also lost out (in a replay) at the same stage of that season's Scottish Cup to eventual winners Dunfermline Athletic.

Prior to that, Dundee's greatest triumph – winning the 1961–62 Scottish Division One, the only league title in their history – also involved heartbreak for St Johnstone, as the Dark Blues, needing only a draw to secure the championship, won 3–0 at Muirton Park on the final day, a result which saw the home club relegated on goal average.

Saints gained a small form of revenge many years later, with both teams in the second tier, when they won 1–0 at Dens Park to all but confirm their return to the top flight by winning the 2008–09 Scottish First Division (it was not mathematically certain at that point, although they eventually held a 10-point margin by the season's end).

=== Results table ===
As of: 18 May 2025.

Competition	GP	DFC	Dr	STJ	DFCG	STJG
League	157	63	40	54	230	198
Scottish Cup	10	6	2	2	22	10
League Cup	12	6	2	4	23	15
Challenge Cup	1	0	0	1	1	5
Total	180	75	44	61	276	228

== Dundee United vs Dundee ==
- First meeting: 21 November 1925, 1925–26 Scottish Division One
- Next meeting: 14 March 2026, 2025–26 Scottish Premiership

The city rivals contested the 1980 Scottish League Cup Final, held at Dens Park after lots were drawn. United's 3–0 victory was one of the early signs of them becoming a force in Scottish football along with Aberdeen, with the two clubs' spell of success and relative geographical proximity leading to them being dubbed the New Firm, challenging Glasgow's Old Firm. Previously existing in Dundee's shadow, the United team built by Jim McLean had won the previous edition of the League Cup too, their victory over Aberdeen also played at Dens in a replay after a draw at Hampden Park; Paul Sturrock was a scorer in both years.

Dundee United would win the league title in 1983, and once again it was Dens Park which was the scene of their victory, winning 2–1 over Dundee thanks to a memorable chipped goal from Ralph Milne to top the table by one point from Celtic and Aberdeen. They also came out on top 3–2 in the semi-final of the 1986–87 Scottish Cup between the teams played at Tynecastle Park, although lost the final to St Mirren.

The Tangerines' good fortune at Dens Park ran out in May 2016, however, as Dundee won the city derby 2–1 to confirm United's descent to the second tier.

=== Results table ===
As of: 27 April 2026.

Competition	GP	DUT	Dr	DFC	DUTG	DFCG
League	147	69	35	43	245	186
Scottish Cup	19	8	7	4	30	22
League Cup	16	7	4 (Note: Includes 1 penalty shootout victory for Dundee in 1996 following a draw, counted as a win in the source but usually considered a draw)	5	27	26
Total	182	84	46	52	302	234

== Totals for three teams ==
As of: 27 April 2026.

Competition	GP	DUT	DFC	STJ	Dr	DUTG	DFCG	STJG
League	466	130	106	112	118	472	466	420
Scottish Cup	33	10	10	4	9	36	44	17
League Cup	45	19	11	7	8	70	49	39
Challenge Cup	1	0	0	1	0	0	1	5
Total	545	159	127	123	136	578	558	481
Total goals:						1,617		

== League placing comparison ==
(2000–2025)

P.	01	02	03	04	05	06	07	08	09	10	11	12	13	14	15	16	17	18	19	20	21	22	23	24	25
1																									
2																									
3										3			3												
4											4	4		4	4	4	4					4			4
5				5				5	5						5						5				
6	6		6									6	6	6	6					6				6	
7				7															7						
8		8								8	8					8		8							
9		9			9	9	9											9			9		9		
10	10																10							10	10
11	11		11																			11			
12		12			12								12			12			12			12	12		12
D2			3	3	8	2	2	2	1	2	6	2		1			3	3	2	1	2		1	1	
D2						7	3	3	4											3					
