= Bobby Ancell =

Scottish footballer and manager

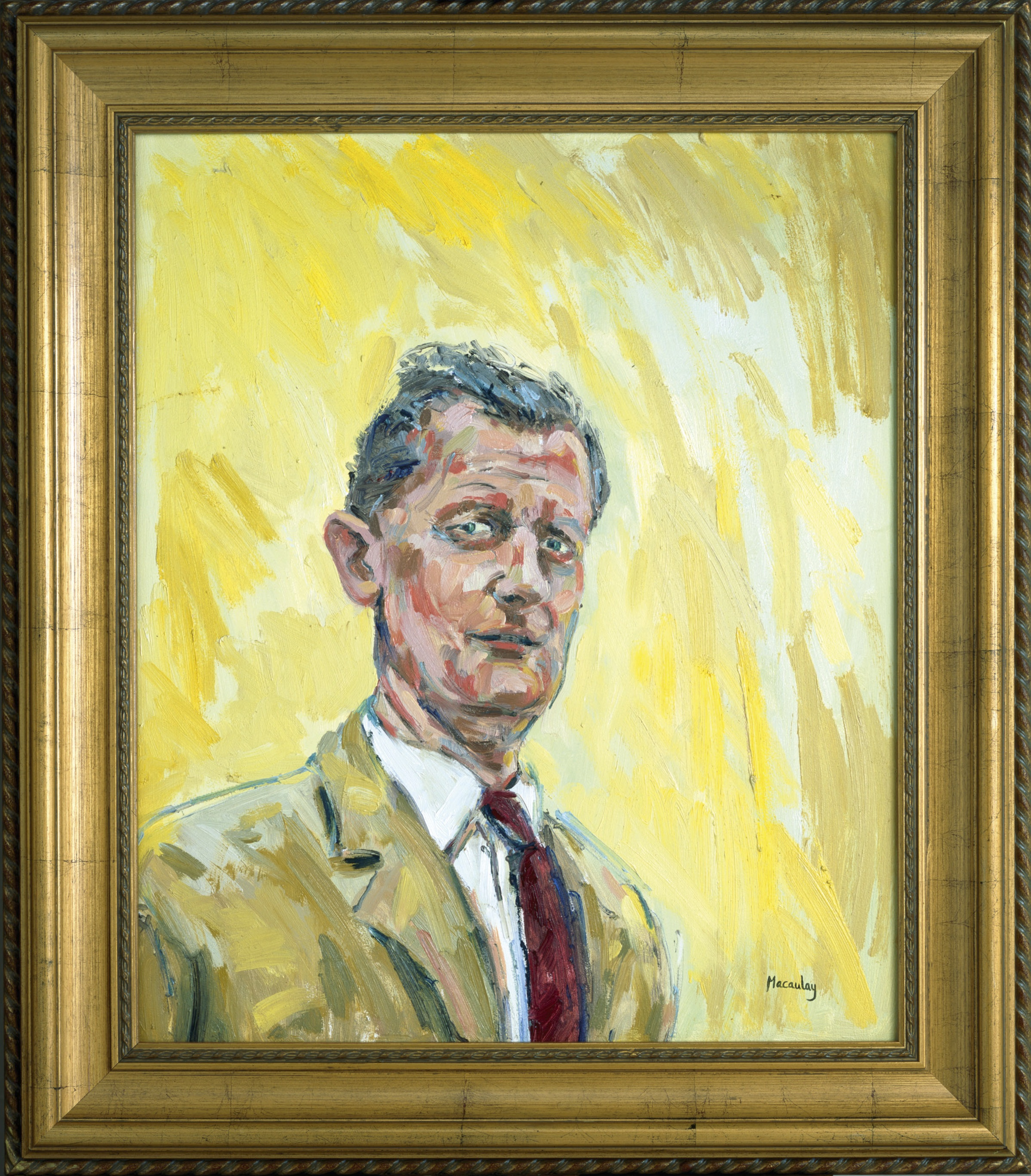
- Bobby Ancell

Personal information
- Full name: Robert Francis Dudgeon Ancell
- Date of birth: 16 June 1911
- Place of birth: Dumfries, Scotland
- Date of death: 5 July 1987 (aged 76)
- Height: 5 ft 9 in (1.75 m)
- Position: Left back

Youth career
- Mid Annandale

Senior career*
Years	Team	Apps	(Gls)
1930–1937	St Mirren	158	(0)
1936–1939	Newcastle United	97	(1)
1946–1948	Dundee	58	(0)
1948–1949	Aberdeen	15	(0)
1949–1950	Dundee	6	(0)
Total		334	(1)

International career
1936	Scotland	2	(0)
1939	Scotland (wartime)	1	(0)

Managerial career
- 1950–1952: Berwick Rangers
- 1952–1955: Dunfermline Athletic
- 1955–1965: Motherwell
- 1965–1968: Dundee
- * Club domestic league appearances and goals

Robert Francis Dudgeon Ancell (16 June 1911 – 5 July 1987) was a Scottish football player and manager. He played as a left back for St Mirren, Newcastle United, Dundee and Aberdeen. He won two full caps with the Scotland national football team who he also represented in an unofficial war time match. He managed Berwick Rangers, Dunfermline Athletic, Motherwell and Dundee during the 1950s and 1960s.

== Player ==
Born in Dumfries, Ancell grew up with a marked aptitude for sport, thanks in no small part to his father, a physical training instructor at Dumfries Academy. As a teenager, he represented his home town at both cricket and rugby and one of his first jobs was as an assistant golf professional, a sport in which he retained a keen interest, eventually playing off a handicap of three.

Ancell's playing career began with local side Mid Annandale, from where he moved to St Mirren in 1930. He was a stylish, intelligent full back. Ancell stayed with the Paisley club for six years, where the best league finishes were fifth in 1932 and seventh in 1933. In 1934 he played for St Mirren in a Scottish Cup final defeat against Rangers in front of a crowd of 113,430. However the team was in decline and was relegated in 1935. This was the only relegation of Ancell's career as either player or manager. The drop of a division was short lived though, and promotion straight back up followed the season after.

Ancell was signed by Newcastle United for a fee of £2,750 for the start of season 1936–37. Within months of joining Newcastle, Ancell received international recognition. He made his Scotland debut in a 3–1 victory over Northern Ireland. He second and last cap was shortly after in the season against Wales. Ancell received a third, unofficial cap, against England in December 1939 played at Newcastle's St. James' Park.

Having returned north upon the outbreak of World War II, Ancell served the war as a PT instructor as many players did. Guesting for numerous teams before joining Dundee in 1944, he had a spell as coach to the Norwegian army. Ancell helped Dundee lift the Second Division championship in 1946–47 and their first season back in the top flight ended in fourth spot.

In season 1948–49 he left the Dark Blues to join a side managed by a fellow native of Dumfries, Dave Halliday's Aberdeen. Ancell returned to Dundee play a small number of games in the season after.

== Manager ==
Ancell then turned his hand to management in 1950 with Berwick Rangers, then of the East of Scotland League, turning down an offer from Dunfermline Athletic who at that point were making headlines from board room disputes. Ancell was then approached by Dunfermline again in 1952 and with a completely new set of directors running the club, and accepted the offer. The Pars had been without a manager during the previous season and, having released no fewer than eighteen players at the end of it, Ancell had to rebuild the squad with very little money. The upheaval led to a mediocre season but Ancell was happy to develop young talent and shape them into the kind of players he wanted. One of his first signings was 17-year-old Jimmy Millar. The Dunfermline improved in all three seasons under Ancell and achieved promotion to the First Division in 1955 after an absence of eighteen years; however Ancell moved on.

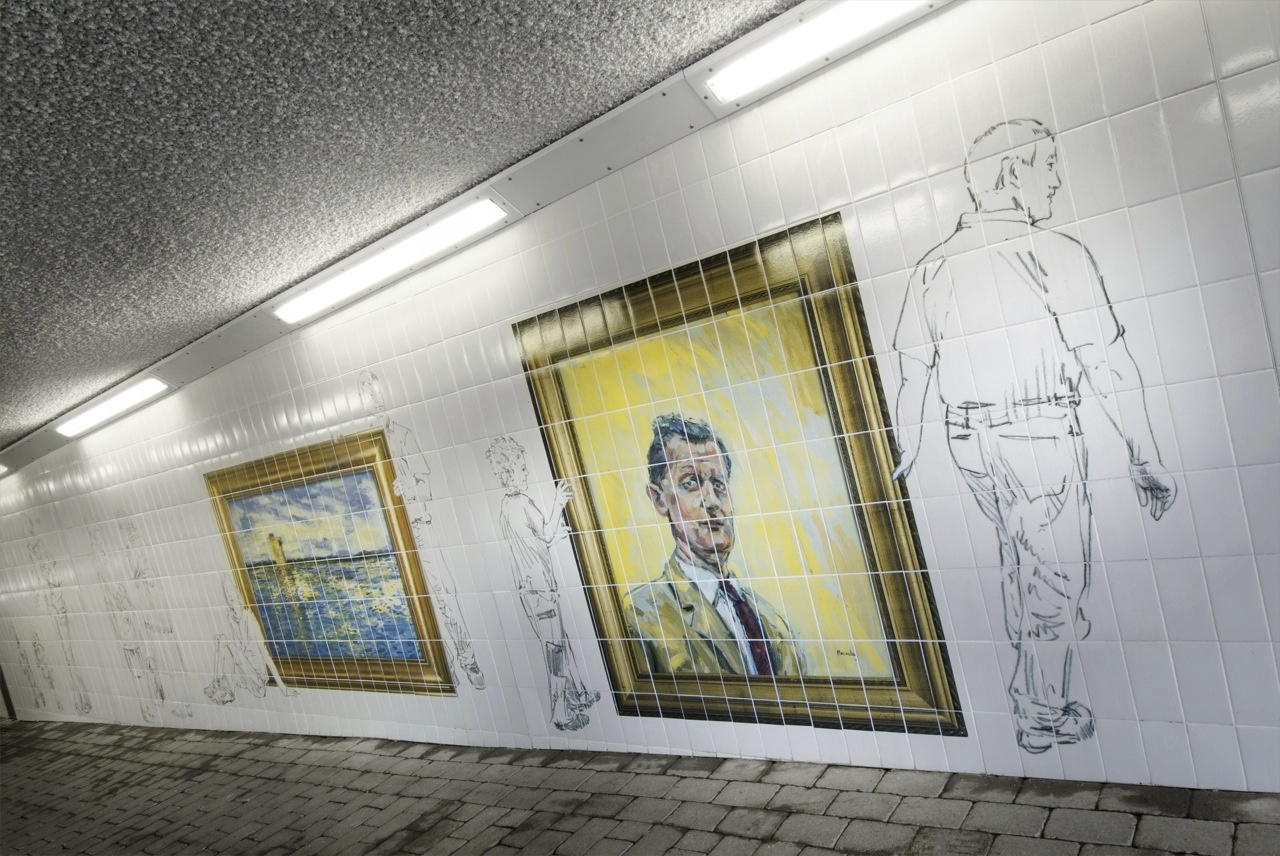
Commemorative mural in Motherwell featuring Bobby Ancell

Motherwell was Ancell's next port of call in 1955 where he appointed ex-Dundee teammate Reuben Bennett to his training staff. At Fir Park, he was able to put his purist principles into practice and developed a dynamic young side known as the 'Ancell Babes'. Under his guidance, no fewer than eight players gained international recognition featuring players like Ian St John, Charlie Aitken and Willie Hunter. The club's best finish in Ancell's tenure was third place in 1959 followed by finishes in fifth spot in the two subsequent seasons.

Ancell next rejoined former club Dundee where his best finish was sixth in 1967. He took Dundee to an autumn 1967 Scottish League Cup Final against the previous season's European Cup winners, Celtic. Ancell's team scored three times at Hampden Park in Glasgow but still lost out 5–3. In the 1967–68 Inter-Cities Fairs Cup, Dundee eliminated opposition from Netherlands, Belgium and Switzerland to meet Leeds United in the semi-final; after a 1–1 draw at Dens, a 1–0 second leg win took Leeds through on their way to lifting the trophy. From his first to last season in management, not once did his side finish a season having been fighting for divisional survival.

After a year working as reserve team coach at Dens Park, he acted for Nottingham Forest in a scouting role before finally retiring from the game to spend more time on the golf course prior to his death on 5 July 1987.

== Honours ==
=== Player ===
St Mirren

- Scottish Cup: runner-up 1934

Dundee

- Scottish Division Two: 1946–47

=== Manager ===
Dunfermline Athletic

- Scottish Division Two: promotion 1951–52

Dundee

- Scottish League Cup: Runners-up 1967–68
- Forfarshire Cup: 1965–66, 1966–67
