= Sammy Wilson (footballer, born 1937) =

Northern Irish footballer (1936–2022)

Personal information
- Date of birth: 30 November 1936
- Place of birth: Dromore, County Down, Northern Ireland
- Date of death: 30 October 2022 (aged 85)
- Place of death: Dromore, County Down, Northern Ireland
- Height: 5 ft 8 in (1.73 m)
- Position: Forward

Senior career*
Years	Team	Apps	(Gls)
1954–1956	Crusaders		
1956–1963	Glenavon		
1963–1965	Falkirk	60	(28)
1965–1968	Dundee	50	(18)
1968–1970	Coleraine		
Total		110	(46)

International career
1961–1967	Northern Ireland	12	(7)
- * Club domestic league appearances and goals

Samuel J. Wilson (30 November 1936 – 30 October 2022) was a Northern Irish footballer who played as a forward.

== Career ==
Born in Dromore, County Down on 30 November 1936, Wilson played for Crusaders, Glenavon, Falkirk, Dundee and Coleraine. He also earned twelve caps for the Northern Ireland national team.

Wilson later became a farmer, auctioneer and estate agent.
