= Billy Campbell (Northern Irish footballer) =

Northern Irish footballer (1944–2026)

Personal information
- Full name: William Gibson Campbell
- Date of birth: 2 July 1944
- Place of birth: Belfast, Northern Ireland
- Date of death: 13 March 2026 (aged 81)
- Position: Right winger

Youth career
- Distillery

Senior career*
Years	Team	Apps	(Gls)
1964–1966	Sunderland	5	(0)
1966–1970	Dundee	102	(17)
1970–1974	Motherwell	76	(6)
1974–1976	Linfield		
1976–1977	Hamilton Academical	3	(1)
1977–1978	Lossiemouth		
Total		186	(24)

International career
1967–1970	Northern Ireland	6	(1)

Managerial career
- 1974–1975: Linfield (player-manager)
- * Club domestic league appearances and goals

William Gibson Campbell (2 July 1944 – 13 March 2026) was a Northern Irish footballer who played as a right winger for Sunderland, Dundee, Motherwell, Hamilton Academical and Northern Ireland. He was also the player-manager of Linfield. He died on 13 March 2026, at the age of 81.

== Career statistics ==
=== International ===
Appearances and goals by national team and year
National team	Year	Apps	Goals
Northern Ireland	1967	2	0
Northern Ireland	1968	1	1
Northern Ireland	1969	1	0
Northern Ireland	1970	2	0
Total		6	1

Scores and results list Northern Ireland's goal tally first, score column indicates score after each Campbell goal.

List of international goals scored by Billy Campbell
No.	Date	Venue	Cap	Opponent	Score	Result	Competition
1.	23 October 1968	Windsor Park, Belfast, Northern Ireland	3	Turkey	4–1	4–1	1970 FIFA World Cup qualification (UEFA)
