= Alex Stuart (footballer) =

Scottish footballer and manager

Personal information
- Full name: Alexander Stuart
- Date of birth: 8 August 1940 (age 86)
- Place of birth: Aberdeen, Scotland
- Height: 5 ft 9 in (1.75 m)
- Position: Left-back

Youth career
- Aberdeen East End

Senior career*
| Years | Team | Apps | (Gls) |
| 1958–1969 | Dundee | 166 | (21) |
| 1969 | Dundee United | 1 | (0) |
| 1969–1973 | Montrose | 76 | (8) |

Managerial career
- 1969–1975: Montrose
- 1975–1978: Ayr United
- 1978–1980: St Johnstone
- 1980: Knattspyrnufélag Reykjavíkur
- * Club domestic league appearances and goals

Alexander Stuart (born 8 August 1940) is a Scottish former footballer and manager who played as a left-back.

Beginning his career in 1958 with Dundee, Stuart went on to spend ten years at Dens Park, winning the Scottish Football League in 1961–62 and gaining a Scottish Cup runners-up medal two years later. In 1969, Stuart moved to city rivals Dundee United but left within the year to become player/manager at Montrose. Stuart spent six years at Links Park.

He moved to succeed Ally MacLeod at Premier Division side Ayr United in 1975-76 season. He kept the part-time side in the top flight for two seasons. He had a short, final managerial spell with St Johnstone at the end of the 1970s. Stuart went on to become a sports administrator, working on a project for Dundee and Dundee United to share a youth academy. He is now retired.

After creating many sports centres throughout Dundee, he is now to thank for providing facilities for younger players to try to improve their football. In 2017, he was inducted into the Dundee Hall of Fame for being a part of the 'Golden Era'.

== Honours ==
=== Dundee ===
- Scottish Football League: 1

1961–62

- Scottish Cup Runner-up: 1

1963–64
