= Alex Bryce (footballer) =

Scottish footballer

Personal information
- Date of birth: 22 May 1944
- Place of birth: Glasgow, Scotland
- Date of death: 10 April 2025 (aged 80)
- Position: Midfielder

Youth career
- Strathclyde

Senior career*
Years	Team	Apps	(Gls)
1961–1964	Third Lanark	32	(4)
1964–1966	Clyde	58	(12)
1966–1972	Dundee	104	(22)
1972	Falkirk	8	(0)
1972–1973	Cowdenbeath	13	(0)
Total		215	(38)
- * Club domestic league appearances and goals

Alex Bryce (22 May 1944 – 10 April 2025) was a Scottish footballer, who played for Third Lanark, Clyde, Dundee, Falkirk and Cowdenbeath.

He died on 10 April 2025.
