= Bobby Wilson (footballer, born 1943) =

Scottish footballer (1943–2026)

Personal information
- Full name: Robert Angus Wilson
- Date of birth: 23 July 1943
- Place of birth: Windygates, Scotland
- Date of death: 18 November 2026 (aged 83)
- Place of death: Inverness, Scotland
- Position: Right-back

Youth career
- Dundonald Bluebell

Senior career*
| Years | Team | Apps | (Gls) |
| 1961–1966 | Cowdenbeath | 134 | (2) |
| 1966–1976 | Dundee | 296 | (8) |
- Lossiemouth
| Total | | 430 | (10) |

International career
| 1967 | Scottish Football League XI | 1 | (0) |

Managerial career
- 1983–1986: Raith Rovers
- 1987–1996: Ross County
- * Club domestic league appearances and goals

Robert Angus Wilson (23 July 1943 – 18 November 2026) was a Scottish footballer who played as a right-back in the Scottish Football League for Cowdenbeath and Dundee. He was given a testimonial match by Dundee, played against Celtic on 1 December 1975. Wilson went on to manage Raith Rovers and Ross County. He was inducted into the Dundee FC Hall of Fame in 2013. Wilson died at a hospital in Inverness, in the early hours of 18 November 2026, aged 83.
