= Jim Easton =

Scottish footballer and manager

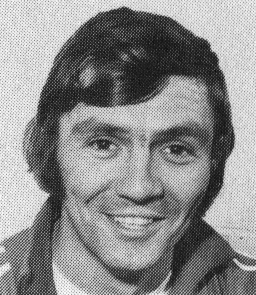
- Easton in 1975

Personal information
- Date of birth: 3 September 1940 (age 86)
- Place of birth: Glasgow, Scotland
- Position: Midfielder

Youth career
- Drumchapel Amateurs

Senior career*
Years	Team	Apps	(Gls)
1960–1964	Hibernian	79	(1)
1964–1971	Dundee	168	(1)
1971–1973	Queen of the South	57	(2)
1973	Miami Toros	19	(0)

International career
1963	Scotland under-23	1	(0)

Managerial career
- 1971–1973: Queen of the South
- 1974–1975: Vancouver Whitecaps
- * Club domestic league appearances and goals

Jim Easton (born 3 September 1940) is a Scottish former professional footballer and manager. He played for Hibernian and Dundee and was player/manager of Queen of the South. He also played for the Miami Toros in the NASL and also managed the Vancouver Whitecaps for their first two seasons.

== Club career ==
Easton was with Drumchapel Amateurs before joining the senior ranks with Hibernian. He was with Hibernian from 1960 to 1964, making 79 league appearances in which he scored one goal. He also played in European ties, including a 3–2 victory against FC Barcelona at Easter Road.

Easton joined Dundee and was there until 1971. During his time with Dundee, he made 168 league appearances in which he again scored once. He also played 11 Scottish cup games and 22 league cup games. He also played a number of European cup games scoring the winning goal against Zurich in 1967.

Easton was appointed Queen of the South player / manager in May 1971. He made 57 league appearances for the Dumfries club in which he scored twice. He left Palmerston Park in March of his second season after which he moved to Canada.

Jim Easton played for the Miami Toros in 1973 in the original North American Soccer League. He then moved on to expansion Vancouver Whitecaps as manager from 1974 to 1975, and saw good success during his tenure with a small budget and local players.

== International career ==
While at Hibernian, he gained one Scotland under-23 cap.

== Personal life ==
Jim is married to Rae Easton (née Coffey) to which they have three children; Jim Easton Jr. (a former NASL player himself), Stewart Easton and Alan Easton; and four granddaughters, Kaitlyn, Nicola, Eliana and Gabriela and one grandson Ewan. He currently resides in North Vancouver BC Canada.
