= Ally Donaldson =

Scottish footballer

Personal information
- Date of birth: 27 November 1943 (age 82)
- Place of birth: Edinburgh, Scotland
- Position: Goalkeeper

Youth career
- Tynecastle

Senior career*
Years	Team	Apps	(Gls)
1964–1972	Dundee	189	(0)
1972–1976	Falkirk	138	(0)
1976–1981	Dundee	126	(0)
1981	Hibernian	6	(0)
1981–1982	Raith Rovers	18	(0)
Total		477	(0)

International career
1964–1965	Scotland U23	2	(0)
1965–1969	Scottish League XI	2	(0)
- * Club domestic league appearances and goals

Ally Donaldson (born 27 November 1943) is a Scottish former footballer who played for Tynecastle, Dundee, Falkirk, Hibernian and Raith Rovers, as a goalkeeper.
