= George Stewart (footballer, born 1947) =

Scottish footballer

Personal information
- Date of birth: 29 August 1947 (age 79)
- Place of birth: Edinburgh, Scotland
- Position: Defender

Youth career
- Tynecastle Boys Club

Senior career*
Years	Team	Apps	(Gls)
1964–1976	Dundee	199	(6)
1976–1981	Hibernian	109	(2)
1981	Cowdenbeath	13	(1)
Total		321	(9)
- * Club domestic league appearances and goals

George Stewart (born 29 August 1947) is a Scottish former professional footballer who played for Dundee and Hibernian. Born in Edinburgh, Stewart started his career with Tynecastle Boys Club, before signing for Dundee in 1964. Stewart was part of the Dundee side that won the 1973 Scottish League Cup Final.

He transferred to Hibernian in 1976, after Dundee were relegated from the Scottish Premier Division. Stewart played in over 100 league matches for Hibs, and played in the twice-replayed 1979 Scottish Cup Final. Stewart had helped Hibs reach that final by scoring one of the goals against Edinburgh derby rivals Hearts in the quarter-final. Stewart left Hibs in 1981 to sign for Cowdenbeath, but at the end of the season he joined Dunfermline as a coach. He then returned to Hibs as an assistant to Pat Stanton.
