= Muirton Park =

Football ground in Perth, Scotland

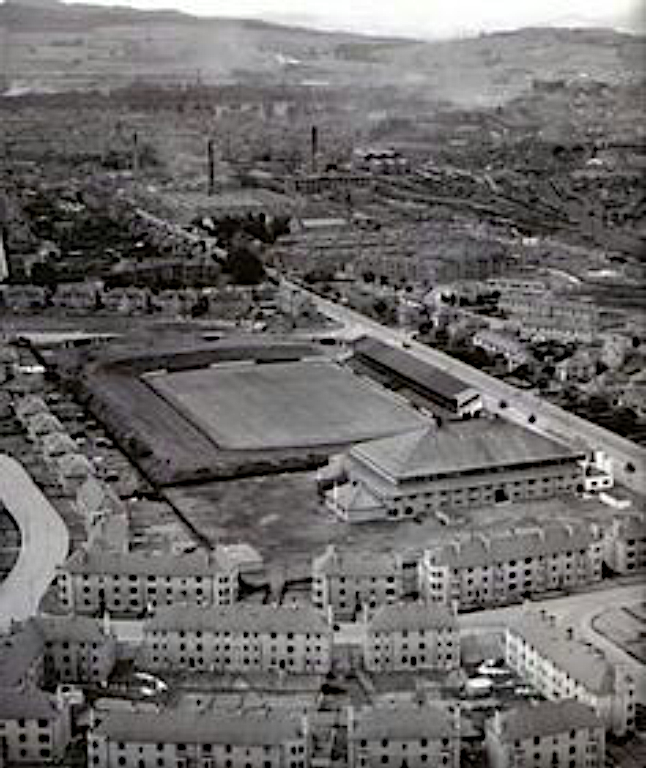
- Muirton Park in the mid-20th century, looking south

- Location within Perth and Kinross
- Location: Perth, Scotland
- Coordinates: 56°24′22.16″N 3°26′46.13″W
- Owner: St Johnstone F.C.
- Record attendance: 29,972

Construction
- Opened: 25 December 1924
- Closed: 29 April 1989
- Cost: £13,194

Muirton Park was the second of three football stadiums the football club St Johnstone from Perth, Scotland, have occupied in their history. It was preceded by the Recreation Grounds (1885–1924) and succeeded by McDiarmid Park (1989–present). Muirton Park stood between 1924 and 1989, at which point it was demolished and replaced with a supermarket.

== History ==
From 1885, St Johnstone played its home fixtures at the Recreation Grounds, which was situated opposite Perth Prison on Edinburgh Road. However, as the club grew in stature and obtained Scottish Football League status, it became apparent that the Recreation Grounds no longer met their needs and would cost too much to develop. The men in charge of the club's affairs decided it was time to look at other options and locations for the club to relocate.

Soon after, vacant land at Muirton was chosen as the preferred site out of several given serious consideration for a brand new football ground. The Muirton site was adjacent to an "excellent public highway" (the Dunkeld Road) and was served by the Corporation trams. The underlying soil conditions were also ideal for creating a fine football pitch, plus there was ample space for spectators to enter and exit the proposed new football park.

It was then unanimously agreed at a meeting of the shareholders held in February 1924, that the club would move to the new Muirton Park site at what was at that time on the northern outskirts of the town. Muirton Park was constructed in accordance with almost all football grounds of that era: it was of a basic design with uncovered terracing on three sides of the ground. The grandstand running along the Dunkeld Road side of the pitch was of a steel and concrete construction but with wooden flooring and seating. The pitch at Muirton Park was of international standard and dimensions. The first match took place on Christmas Day, 1924, against Queen's Park in front of an official attendance of over 11,000.

The stadium was largely unchanged until the early 1950s, when a terracing cover was added to the east side. A record attendance of 29,972 was set by a 1950–51 Scottish Cup tie against Tayside derby rivals Dundee. The floodlights were also installed in the 1960s and were first used on 28 November 1964 in a match against Hearts. Reigning FA Cup holders West Ham were invited up to Scotland for a challenge match on 16 December 1964 to commemorate the inauguration of the new floodlights. The uncovered standing areas behind each goal were colloquially known as the Ice Rink End and the Florence Place/Town End. Before the permanent segregation fence was erected it was common for fans to "change ends" during half-time and congregate towards the end that St Johnstone was attacking.

As a result of the club's promotion to the Premier Division in 1983, Muirton Park became a designated stadium under the Safety of Sports Grounds Act. The club was immediately relegated to the lower divisions, but the designation remained in place and the club could not afford the remedial work required. The North Stand, plus part of the Centre Stand, were closed off as a direct result of the disastrous fire at Bradford City in 1985 raising the issue that all such wooden stands were simply too dangerous. Of 2185 seats in the main stand, only 500 were permitted for use. The future looked bleak for Muirton Park and for a club looking at huge costs to bring the ground up to modern standards if they achieved their aim of playing at the top flight of Scottish football. Muirton Park had remained almost unchanged until a permanent segregation fence was put in place prior to a Scottish Cup tie against Aberdeen in 1988.

Out of the blue, the UK supermarket chain Asda offered to purchase the land occupied by Muirton Park and the neighbouring ice rink to enable them to build a new superstore. As part of the deal, ASDA would bear the costs of building Saints a new all-seated stadium on the western edge of the town. Although a fair amount of financial wrangling ensued, and the whole deal was on the verge of falling through at times, by the beginning of 1989-90 season, 65-year-old Muirton Park had been demolished and St Johnstone were beginning a new era at McDiarmid Park.

== Statistics ==
- St Johnstone played at Muirton Park for more than 64 years - from December 1924 to April 1989
- The total cost involved in building Muirton Park totalled £13,194
  - The purchase price of the land at South Muirton was £294
  - Ground preparation cost £3,207
  - Construction of the grandstand cost £9,574
  - £117 was spent on various fixtures and fittings
- First Match: 25 December 1924 v. Queen's Park
- Last Match: 29 April 1989 v. Ayr United
- Highest attendance: 29,972 v. Dundee (10 February 1951)
- Lowest attendance: 466 v. Albion Rovers (April 1986)

== See also ==
- Stadium relocations in Scottish football
