= Doug Houston =

Scottish footballer

Personal information
- Full name: Douglas Houston
- Date of birth: 13 April 1943 (age 83)
- Place of birth: Glasgow, Scotland
- Position: Midfielder

Senior career*
Years	Team	Apps	(Gls)
1960–1962	Queen's Park	56	(16)
1962–1973	Dundee	235	(16)
1973	Rangers	10	(0)
1973–1977	Dundee United	86	(5)
1977–1979	St Johnstone	47	(0)
Total		434	(37)

Managerial career
- 1980–1982: Brechin City
- 1982–1986: Forfar Athletic
- * Club domestic league appearances and goals

Douglas Houston (born 13 April 1943 in Glasgow) is a Scottish former footballer who played midfield. Houston, who played around half his career with Dundee, also played for Queen's Park, Rangers, Dundee United and St Johnstone, before becoming manager at Brechin City and then Forfar Athletic. Houston won a Scottish League Cup runners-up medal with Dundee and a Scottish Cup runners-up medal during his time with Dundee United.

== Honours ==
- League Cup: Runner-up

1967–68

- Scottish Cup: Runner-up

1973–74
