= 1966–67 Celtic F.C. season =

Celtic
1966–67 season
- Manager: Jock Stein
- Scottish Division One: 1st
- Scottish Cup: Winners
- Scottish League Cup: Winners
- Glasgow Cup: Winners
- European Cup: Winners
- Top goalscorer: League: Stevie Chalmers (21); All: Joe McBride (35)
- Average home league attendance: 31,082
Home colours	Away colours

Celtic competed for five trophies in the 1966–67 season and the club won all of them: the Scottish League, the Scottish Cup, the Scottish League Cup, the Glasgow Cup, and the European Cup, and completed the only ever European Quintuple. However, their European Cup victory from this season qualified them for the World Championship the following season, which they went on to lose in a playoff to Racing. Over the course of this season, Celtic scored a world record 196 goals in the major competitions they took part in.

The team from this season are commonly known as the Lisbon Lions, because the European Cup final was held in Lisbon.

== Season overview ==
Season 1966–67 is considered Celtic's annus mirabilis. The club won every competition they entered: the Scottish League, the Scottish Cup, the Scottish League Cup, the Glasgow Cup, and the European Cup; scoring a world record total of 196 goals in the process.

The League Cup was the first trophy to be won that season, courtesy of a 1–0 win on 29 October 1966 over Rangers in the final. The Glasgow Cup was secured a week later when Celtic beat Partick Thistle 4–0; Stevie Chalmers opening the scoring, and Bobby Lennox scoring a hat-trick. Celtic's progression to the Scottish Cup was relatively straightforward aside from being taken to replay in the semi-final by Clyde. On 29 April 1967 Celtic met Aberdeen in the final, and two Willie Wallace goals eased Celtic to a 2–0 win. The league campaign proved to be a more tightly contested affair as, despite Celtic only losing twice, with two games remaining Rangers were still in contention. Celtic's penultimate league fixture was against Rangers at Ibrox, with a draw required to clinch the title. A brace by Jimmy Johnstone gave Celtic a 2–2 draw and the championship.

Celtic's European Cup campaign in 1966–67 was their first ever participation in Europe's premier club tournament. FC Zürich and Nantes were comfortably disposed of in the first two rounds (5–0 and 6–2 on aggregate respectively). The quarter final in March 1967 pitched Celtic against the Yugoslav champions, Vojvodina. The Yugoslav side won the first leg in Novi Sad 1–0. The return match in Glasgow proved to be a fraught affair. The Yugoslavs defended resolutely and threatened on the counter-attack, but Celtic levelled the tie on aggregate in the second half with a goal by Stevie Chalmers. Celtic pressed for a winner, but Vojvodina defended well and the tie looked like a play-off in neutral Rotterdam would be required. However, in the final minute Billy McNeill headed in a Charlie Gallacher cross to see Celtic progress to the semi-final. Celtic now faced Czechoslovak side Dukla Prague. This time the first leg of the tie took place in Glasgow, with Celtic winning 3–1 courtesy of goals from Jimmy Johnstone and a Willie Wallace brace. In respect of his opponents' quality, manager Jock Stein set up Celtic to be ultra-defensive for the second leg and forsake - temporarily - their philosophy of attacking football. The tactics worked as Celtic secured a 0–0 draw to put them in the final. However, Stein was almost apologetic about the manner of Celtic's success in that game and he felt uncomfortable in later years discussing the matter.

1967 European Cup Final line-up
(The Lisbon Lions)

The final saw Celtic play Inter Milan, with the match taking place at the Estádio Nacional on the outskirts of Lisbon on 25 May 1967. Celtic fell a goal behind after only seven minutes, Jim Craig adjudged to have fouled Renato Cappellini in the penalty box and Sandro Mazzola converting the resultant penalty. Celtic swept into constant attack after that but found Inter goalkeeper Giuliano Sarti in outstanding form. With 63 minutes played, after incessant pressure, Celtic finally equalised when Tommy Gemmell scored with a powerful 25-yard shot. The balance of play remained the same with Inter defending deeply against sustained Celtic attacking. With about five minutes remaining, a long-range shot from Bobby Murdoch was diverted by Stevie Chalmers past a wrong-footed Sarti. It proved to be the winning goal and thus Celtic became the first British team, and the first from outside Spain, Portugal or Italy to win the competition.

Jock Stein commented after the match,

Winning was important, but it was the way that we won that has filled me with satisfaction. We did it by playing football; pure, beautiful, inventive football. There was not a negative thought in our heads.

Celtic are one of only two clubs to have won the trophy with a team composed entirely of players from the club's home country; all of the players in the side were born within 30 miles of Celtic Park in Glasgow, and they subsequently became known as the 'Lisbon Lions'. The entire east stand at Celtic Park is dedicated to The Lisbon Lions, and the west stand to Jock Stein. The sight of captain Billy McNeill holding aloft the European Cup in the Estádio Nacional has become one of the iconic images of Scottish football, immortalized in a bronze statue of McNeill outside Parkhead stadium in 2015, created by John McKenna (sculptor).

Two weeks later, on 7 June 1967, Celtic played Real Madrid in a testimonial match for the now retired Alfredo Di Stefano. In front of over 100,000 fans at the Bernabéu Stadium, the sides engaged in a keenly fought contest which saw Bertie Auld and Real Madrid's Amancio sent off. Di Stefano played for the first 15 minutes, but it was Jimmy Johnstone who stole the show with an exhilarating performance that had even the Spanish supporters chanting "Olé!" throughout the game in appreciation of his skill. Johnstone capped an outstanding performance by playing the pass to Bobby Lennox for the only goal in a 1–0 win for Celtic.

=== Competition overview ===
Competition	First match	Last match	Starting round	Final position	Record							
Competition	First match	Last match	Starting round	Final position	Pld	W	D	L	GF	GA	GD	Win %
Division One	10 September 1966	15 May 1967	Round 1	Winners	34	26	6	2	111	33	+78	76.47
League Cup	13 August 1966	29 October 1966	Group Stage	Winners	10	10	0	0	35	7	+28	100.00
Scottish Cup	28 January 1967	29 April 1967	First round	Winners	6	5	1	0	20	3	+17	83.33
European Cup	28 September 1966	25 May 1967	First round	Winners	9	7	1	1	18	5	+13	77.78
Glasgow Cup	23 August 1966	7 November 1966	First round	Winners	3	3	0	0	12	0	+12	100.00
Total					62	51	8	3	196	48	+148	82.26

Source: Competitions

== Results and fixtures ==
=== Friendlies ===
6 August 1966 Friendly	Celtic	4–1	Manchester United	Celtic Park
	Lennox 7'; Murdoch 10'; McBride 15'; Foulkes o.g. 61'	"Hurricane Celts' glorious start"	Sadler 12'	Attendance: 60,000; Referee: W. Anderson

7 February 1967 Friendly	Celtic	0–1	GNK Dinamo Zagreb	Celtic Park
		"The Glasgow Herald" 8 February 1967	Zambata 87'	Attendance: 46,000; Referee: W. J. Mullan

7 June 1967 Friendly	Real Madrid	0–1	Celtic	Santiago Bernabéu Stadium
				Attendance: 120,000; Referee: S Zariqulegui (Spain)

=== Scottish Division One ===
10 September 1966 Division One	Clyde	0–3	Celtic	Glasgow
15:00 GMT				Stadium: Shawfield Stadium; Attendance: 16,504

17 September 1966 Division One	Celtic	2–0	Rangers	Glasgow
15:00 GMT				Stadium: Celtic Park; Attendance: 61,333

24 September 1966 Division One	Dundee	1–2	Celtic	Dundee
15:00 GMT				Stadium: Dens Park; Attendance: 27,535

1 October 1966 Division One	Celtic	6–1	St Johnstone	Glasgow
15:00				Stadium: Celtic Park; Attendance: 20,777

8 October 1966 Division One	Hibernian	3–5	Celtic	Edinburgh
15:00 GMT				Stadium: Easter Road; Attendance: 43,526

15 October 1966 Division One	Celtic	3–0	Airdireonians	Glasgow
19:00 GMT				Stadium: Celtic Park; Attendance: 39,550

24 October 1966 Division One	Celtic	5–1	Ayr United	Glasgow
15:00 GMT				Stadium: Celtic Park; Attendance: 19,287

2 November 1966 Division One	Celtic	7–3	Stirling Albion	Glasgow
19:30 GMT				Stadium: Celtic Park; Attendance: 17,335

5 November 1966 Division One	Celtic	1–1	St Mirren	Glasgow
15:00 BST				Stadium: Celtic Park; Attendance: 21,725

12 November 1966 Division One	Falkirk	0–3	Celtic	Falkirk
15:00 GMT				Stadium: Brockville Park; Attendance: 13,467

19 November 1966 Division One	Dunfermline Athletic	4–5	Celtic	Dunfermline
15:00 BST				Stadium: East End Park; Attendance: 20,787

26 November 1966 Division One	Celtic	3–0	Hearts	Glasgow
15:00 GMT				Stadium: Celtic Park; Attendance: 36,238

3 December 1966 Division One	Kilmarnock	0–0	Celtic	Kilmarnock
15:00 GMT				Stadium: Rugby Park; Attendance: 27,136

10 December 1966 Division One	Celtic	4–2	Motherwell	Glasgow
15:00 BST				Stadium: Celtic Park; Attendance: 35,022

17 December 1966 Division One	Celtic	6–2	Partick Thistle	Glasgow
15:00 GMT				Stadium: Celtic Park; Attendance: 21,047

24 December 1966 Division One	Aberdeen	1–1	Celtic	Aberdeen
15:00 BST				Stadium: Pittodrie Stadium; Attendance: 30,176

31 December 1966 Division One	Dundee United	3–2	Celtic	Dundee
14:30 GMT				Stadium: Tannadice Park; Attendance: 18,577

7 January 1967 Division One	Celtic	5–1	Dundee	Glasgow
15:00 BST				Stadium: Celtic Park; Attendance: 32,855

11 January 1967 Division One	Celtic	5–1	Clyde	Glasgow
19:30				Stadium: Celtic Park; Attendance: 35,222

14 January 1967 Division One	St Johnstone	0–4	Celtic	Perth
19:30 GMT				Stadium: Muirton Park; Attendance: 17,973

21 January 1967 Division One	Celtic	2–0	Hibernian	Glasgow
15:00 BST				Stadium: Celtic Park; Attendance: 36,727

4 February 1967 Division One	Airdrieonians	0–3	Celtic	Airdrie
15:00 BST				Stadium: Broomfield Park; Attendance: 21,897

11 February 1967 Division One	Ayr United	0–5	Celtic	Ayr
13:00 GMT				Stadium: Somerset Park; Attendance: 13,805

25 February 1967 Division One	Stirling Albion	1–1	Celtic	Stirling
15:00 BST				Stadium: Annfield; Attendance: 15,358

4 March 1967 Division One	St Mirren	0–5	Celtic	Paisley
15:00 GMT				Stadium: St Mirren Park, Love Street; Attendance: 20,068

18 March 1967 Division One	Celtic	3–2	Dunfermline Athletic	Glasgow
15:00 GMT				Stadium: Celtic Park; Attendance: 36,935

20 March 1967 Division One	Celtic	5–0	Falkirk	Glasgow
19:30 GMT				Stadium: Celtic Park; Attendance: 22,393

25 March 1967 Division One	Hearts	0–3	Celtic	Glasgow
15:00 BST				Stadium: Tynecastle Park; Attendance: 24,902

27 March 1967 Division One	Partick Thistle	1–4	Celtic	Glasgow
15:00 BST				Stadium: Firhill Park; Attendance: 29,888

8 April 1967 Division One	Motherwell	0–2	Celtic	Motherwell
15:00 GMT				Stadium: Fir Park; Attendance: 19,873

19 April 1967 Division One	Celtic	0–0	Aberdeen	Glasgow
19:30 GMT				Stadium: Celtic Park; Attendance: 31,712

3 May 1967 Division One	Celtic	2–3	Dundee United	Glasgow
19:30 GMT				Stadium: Celtic Park; Attendance: 40,741

6 May 1967 Division One	Rangers	2–2	Celtic	Glasgow
15:00 GMT				Stadium: Ibrox Park; Attendance: 77,790

15 May 1967 Division One	Celtic	2–0	Kilmarnock	Glasgow
19:30 BST				Stadium: Celtic Park; Attendance: 19,097

=== Scottish League Cup ===
13 August 1966 Group 4	Hearts	0–2	Celtic	Glasgow
15:00 GMT				Stadium: Tynecastle Park; Attendance: 24,022

17 August 1966 Group 4	Celtic	6–0	Clyde	Glasgow
19:30 GMT				Stadium: Celtic Park; Attendance: 27,816

20 August 1966 Group 4	Celtic	8–2	St Mirren	Glasgow
15:00 GMT				Stadium: Celtic Park; Attendance: 29,065

27 August 1966 Group 4	Celtic	3–0	Hearts	Glasgow
15:00 GMT				Stadium: Celtic Park; Attendance: 45,524

31 August 1966 Group 4	Clyde	1–3	Celtic	Glasgow
19:30 GMT				Stadium: Shawfield Stadium; Attendance: 18,878

3 September 1966 Group 4	St Mirren	0–1	Celtic	Paisley
19:30 GMT				Stadium: St Mirren Park, Love Street; Attendance: 18,778

14 September 1966 Quarter-final 1st leg	Celtic	6–3	Dunfermline Athletic	Glasgow
19:30 GMT				Stadium: Celtic Park; Attendance: 33,554

21 September 1966 Quarter-final 2nd leg	Dunfermline Athletic	1–3 (4–9 agg.)	Celtic	Dunfermline
19:30 GMT				Stadium: East End Park; Attendance: 21,291

17 October 1966 Semi-final	Celtic	2–0	Airdrieonians	Glasgow
19:30 GMT				Stadium: Hampden Park; Attendance: 37,101

29 October 1966 Final	Celtic	1–0	Rangers	Glasgow
15:00 GMT				Stadium: Hampden Park; Attendance: 94,492

=== Scottish Cup ===
28 January 1967 First round	Celtic	4–0	Arbroath	Glasgow
15:00 GMT				Stadium: Celtic Park; Attendance: 31,000

18 February 1967 Second round	Celtic	7–0	Elgin City	Glasgow
15:00 GMT				Stadium: Celtic Park; Attendance: 34,000

11 March 1967 Third round	Celtic	5–3	Queen's Park	Glasgow
15:00 GMT				Stadium: Celtic Park; Attendance: 34,000

1 April 1967 Semi-final	Celtic	0–0	Clyde	Glasgow
15:00 GMT				Stadium: Hampden Park; Attendance: 56,787

5 April 1967 Semi-final replay	Celtic	2–0	Clyde	Glasgow
19:30 GMT				Stadium: Hampden Park; Attendance: 55,138

29 April 1967 Final	Celtic	2–0	Aberdeen	Glasgow
15:00 GMT				Stadium: Hampden Park; Attendance: 127,117

=== Glasgow Cup ===
23 August 1966 First round	Rangers	0–4	Celtic	Glasgow
				Stadium: Ibrox Park

10 October 1966 Semi-final	Celtic	4–0	Queen's Park	Glasgow
				Stadium: Celtic Park

7 November 1966 Final	Celtic	4–0	Partick Thistle	Glasgow
19:30 GMT		The Glasgow Herald		Stadium: Celtic Park; Attendance: 31,000

=== European Cup ===
28 September 1966 1st round 1st leg	Celtic (Scotland)	2–0	(Switzerland) FC Zürich	Glasgow
19:00 GMT	Gemmell 64'; McBride 69'			Stadium: Celtic Park; Attendance: 47,604

5 October 1966 1st round 2nd leg	FC Zürich (Switzerland)	0–3 (0–5 agg.)	(Scotland) Celtic	Zürich
19:15 GMT			Gemmell 22' 48' (pen) Chalmers 38'	Stadium: Letzigrund; Attendance: 20,236

30 November 1966 2nd round 1st leg	FC Nantes (France)	1–3	(Scotland) Celtic	Nantes
20:00 GMT			McBride 24'; Lennox 50'; Chalmers 67'	Stadium: Stade Marcel Saupin; Attendance: 15,464

7 December 1966 2nd round 2nd leg	Celtic (Scotland)	3–1 (6–2 agg.)	(France) FC Nantes	Glasgow
20:00 GMT	Johnstone 13'; Chalmers 56'; Lennox 78'			Stadium: Celtic Park; Attendance: 39,120

1 March 1967 Quarter-final 1st leg	FK Vojvodina (Socialist Federal Republic of Yugoslavia)	1–0	(Scotland) Celtic	Novi Sad
18:30 GMT	Stanić 70'	Report		Stadium: Styadium of Vojvodina; Attendance: 24,000; Referee: Paul Schiller (Austria)

8 March 1967 Quarter-final 2nd leg	Celtic (Scotland)	2–0 (2–1 agg.)	(Socialist Federal Republic of Yugoslavia) FK Vojvodina	Glasgow
20:00 GMT	Chalmers 58'; McNeill 90'			Stadium: Celtic Park; Attendance: 63,374

12 April 1967 Semi-final 1st leg	Celtic (Scotland)	3–1	(Czechoslovakia) Dukla Prague	Glasgow
19:30 GMT	Johnstone 27'; Wallace 59', 65'		Štrunc 44'	Stadium: Celtic Park; Attendance: 74,406

25 April 1967 Semi-final 2nd leg	Dukla Prague (Czechoslovakia)	0–0 (1–3 agg.)	(Scotland) Celtic	Prague
15:00 GMT				Stadium: Stadion Juliska; Attendance: 19,157

25 May 1967 Final	Internazionale (Italy)	1–2	(Scotland) Celtic	Lisbon
17:30 GMT	Mazzola 7' (pen.)		Gemmell 63'; Chalmers 84'	Stadium: Estádio Nacional; Attendance: 48,500

== Squad and statistics ==
=== First team squad ===
Note: Flags indicate national team as defined under FIFA eligibility rules; some limited exceptions apply. Players may hold more than one non-FIFA nationality.

No.	Pos.	Nation	Player
—	GK	SCO	Ronnie Simpson
—	GK	SCO	John Fallon
—	GK	NIR	Jack Kennedy
—	GK	DEN	Bent Martin
—	DF	SCO	Jim Craig
—	DF	SCO	Billy McNeill
—	DF	SCO	John Clark
—	DF	SCO	Tommy Gemmell
—	DF	SCO	Jim Brogan
—	DF	SCO	Willie O'Neill
—	DF	SCO	Ian Young
—	DF	SCO	John Cushley

No.	Pos.	Nation	Player
—	DF	SCO	Frank McCarron
—	DF	SCO	Davie Cattanach
—	MF	SCO	Bobby Murdoch
—	MF	SCO	Bertie Auld
—	MF	IRL	Charlie Gallacher
—	MF	SCO	Sammy Henderson
—	FW	SCO	Jimmy Johnstone
—	FW	SCO	Bobby Lennox
—	FW	SCO	Willie Wallace
—	FW	SCO	Stevie Chalmers
—	FW	SCO	Joe McBride
—	FW	SCO	John Hughes

=== Starting XI ===
Note: Flags indicate national team as defined under FIFA eligibility rules; some limited exceptions apply. Players may hold more than one non-FIFA nationality.

No.	Pos.	Nation	Player
1	GK	SCO	Ronnie Simpson
2	DF	SCO	Jim Craig
3	DF	SCO	Tommy Gemmell
4	MF	SCO	Bobby Murdoch
5	DF	SCO	Billy McNeill (Captain)
6	DF	SCO	John Clark
7	FW	SCO	Jimmy Johnstone
8	FW	SCO	Willie Wallace
9	FW	SCO	Stevie Chalmers
10	MF	SCO	Bertie Auld
11	FW	SCO	Bobby Lennox

Celtic's lineup in Lisbon

=== League table ===
Pos	Team	Pld	W	D	L	GF	GA	GD	Pts
1	Celtic	34	26	6	2	111	33	+78	58
2	Rangers	34	24	7	3	92	31	+61	55
3	Clyde	34	20	6	8	64	48	+16	46
4	Aberdeen	34	17	8	9	72	38	+34	42
5	Hibernian	34	19	4	11	72	49	+23	42

Source: RSSSF

== See also ==
- List of Celtic F.C. seasons
- Nine in a row
