= 1967 European Cup final =

- Match programme cover
- Event: 1966–67 European Cup
Inter Milan	Celtic
(Italy)	(Scotland)
1	2
- Date: 25 May 1967
- Venue: Estádio Nacional, Lisbon
- Referee: Kurt Tschenscher (West Germany)
- Attendance: 45,000

The 1967 European Cup final was a football match contested between Italian team Internazionale and Scottish team Celtic to determine the champion of the 1966–67 European Cup. It took place on 25 May 1967 at the Estádio Nacional in Lisbon, Portugal, in front of a crowd of 45,000. The match was Inter's third European final and Celtic's first; the Italian club had won the tournament in two of the previous three years. It was the first final since the beginning of the competition in the 1955–56 season not to feature a team from the Iberian Peninsula and the first not to be won by a team from Southern Europe. The 1967 European Cup Final is widely regarded as one of the greatest upsets in the tournament's history and among the greatest finals ever played, due to Celtic being massive underdogs and lack of European Cup experience, where Inter Milan was heavy favorites due to winning back to back in 1964 and 1965, and having reached their 3rd final in 4 years.

Both teams had to go through four rounds of matches to reach the final. Inter's first tie was very close, but they won their next two by bigger margins. In the semi-final, Inter needed a replay to win their tie. Celtic won their first two ties comfortably, with their second two rounds being tighter.

Inter scored after seven minutes, when Sandro Mazzola converted a penalty. Celtic equalised when Tommy Gemmell scored at the 63 minute mark. Stevie Chalmers then put Celtic in the lead after 84 minutes. The match finished 2–1 to Celtic. It was said to be a victory for football because Celtic's attacking football overcame Inter's catenaccio defensive style, which was considered to be a less attractive way to play the game. Celtic manager Jock Stein and his team received acclaim after the match and were given the nickname the "Lisbon Lions"; this is considered to be the greatest side in the club's history. The victory made Celtic the first British team and first team from northern Europe to win the European Cup.

== Route to the final ==
=== Internazionale ===
Round	Opponents	First leg	Second leg	Aggregate score
First round	(Soviet Union) Torpedo Moscow	1–0 (h)	0–0 (a)	1–0
Second round	(Hungary) Vasas SC	2–1 (h)	2–0 (a)	4–1
Quarter-finals	(Spain) Real Madrid	1–0 (h)	2–0 (a)	3–0
Semi-finals	(Bulgaria) CSKA Red Flag	1–1 (a)	1–1 (h)	2–2
Play-off	CSKA Red Flag	1–0 (n)		

Inter Milan had qualified for the competition as champions of the 1965–66 Serie A, their tenth title, finishing four points ahead of runners-up Bologna. As a result of this, they qualified for the European Cup and their first round opponents were Soviet side Torpedo Moscow. Inter won the first leg 1–0, thanks to an own goal by Valery Voronin before drawing 0–0 in Russia. Their second round opponents were Vasas of Hungary, Inter won 2–1 at home, with goals from Carlo Soldo and Mario Corso, while Lajos Puskás had scored for the visitors. Two goals from Sandro Mazzola gave Inter the victory in the second leg.

Inter beat six-time champions and holders Real Madrid in the quarter-finals. Inter won 1–0 at home, through a Renato Cappellini goal. Before defeating Madrid 2–0 in Spain, thanks to another goal from Cappellini, and an own goal from Ignacio Zoco. In the semi-finals. Inter faced Bulgarian side CSKA Red Flag (now CSKA Sofia). Giacinto Facchetti scored for Inter, as they drew 1–1 at home, with Nikola Tsanev scoring for the visitors. Facchetti scored again in Bulgaria, but his goal was cancelled out by Nikolay Radlev, meaning that a play-off was needed to settle the tie. The play-off was supposed to be held in Graz, Austria, but CSKA were persuaded to let it be moved to Bologna in Italy, after they were offered a larger share of the gate money. The match was won 1–0 by Inter, thanks to a goal from Cappellini, sealing their place in the final.

=== Celtic ===
Round	Opponents	First leg	Second leg	Aggregate score
First round	(Switzerland) Zürich	2–0 (h)	3–0 (a)	5–0
Second round	(France) Nantes	3–1 (a)	3–1 (h)	6–2
Quarter-finals	(Socialist Federal Republic of Yugoslavia) Vojvodina	0–1 (a)	2–0 (h)	2–1
Semi-finals	(Czechoslovakia) Dukla Prague	3–1 (h)	0–0 (a)	3–1

Celtic qualified for the European Cup after winning the 1965–66 Scottish Division One, their 21st title, by two points over Old Firm rivals Rangers. Celtic entered at the first round where they faced Swiss side Zürich. Celtic won 2–0 at home, with goals from Tommy Gemmell and Joe McBride. They then won the away leg 3–0 as Stevie Chalmers scored and Gemmell got a brace. Celtic faced French side Nantes in the second round, and won the away leg 3–1. Nantes had taken the lead through Francis Magny, before McBride had equalised to level the match at 1–1. In the second half, Bobby Lennox and Bertie Auld scored to seal a victory. Celtic won the home leg by the same scoreline. Jimmy Johnstone put them in front, before Gérard Georgin equalised. Celtic again scored twice in the second half, as Chalmers and Lennox secured the victory.

Celtic faced Yugoslav (now Serbian) side Vojvodina Novi Sad in the quarter-finals, and lost the first leg 1–0 after a goal from Milan Stanić; this was Celtic's only defeat of the competition. The tie looked like it was going to end in a draw after Chalmers had given Celtic a 1–0 lead in the second leg. This would have resulted in the teams having to go to Rotterdam for a replay. However, in the 90th minute captain Billy McNeill scored to give Celtic the victory. In the semi-finals, Czechoslovak side Dukla Prague were beaten 3–1 in Glasgow, Johnstone put the hosts in front, before Stanislav Štrunc equalised. A second half brace from Willie Wallace gave Celtic the victory. The teams then drew 0–0 in Prague, which meant Celtic progressed to the final.

== Match ==
=== Background ===
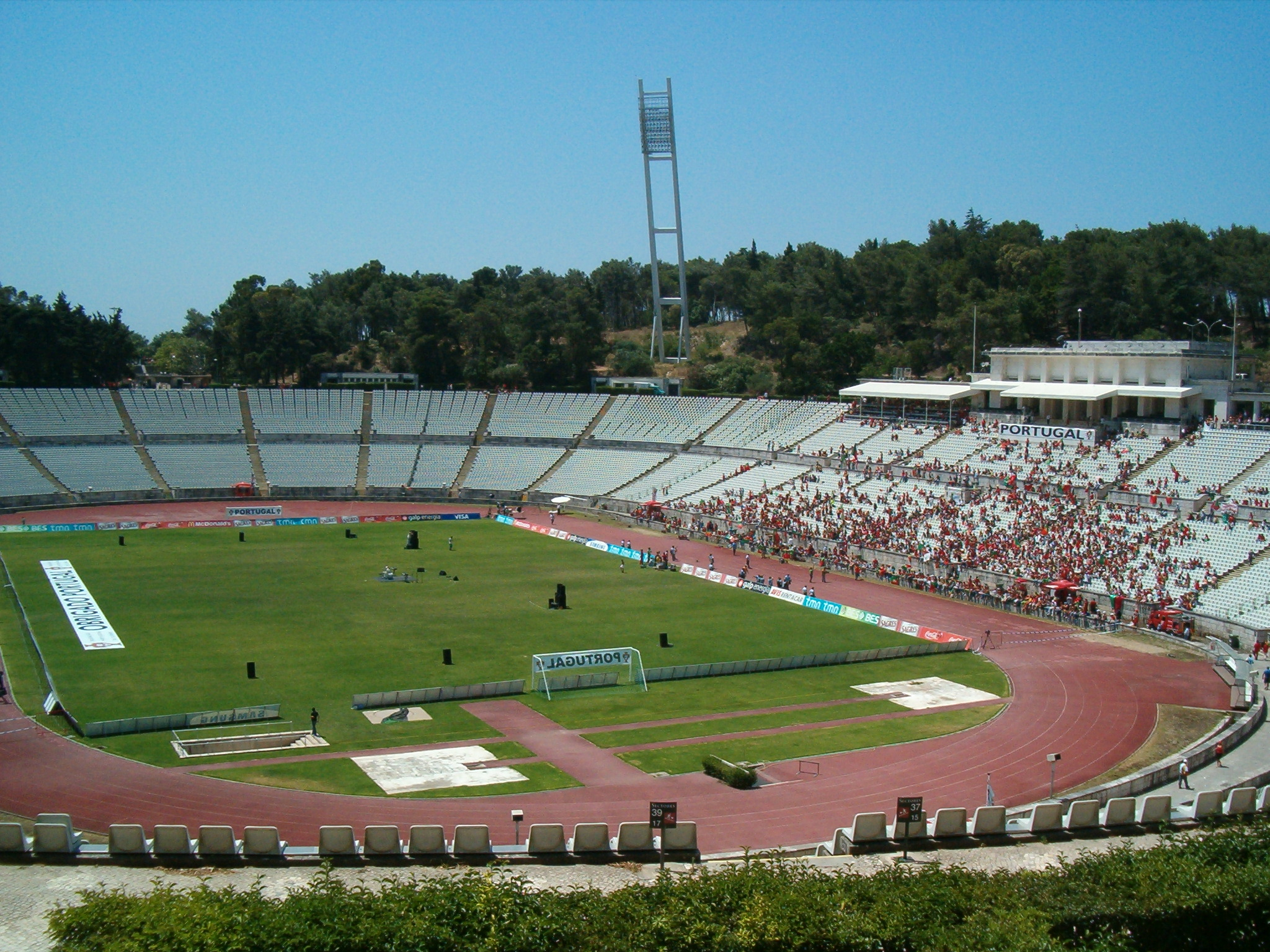
The final was held in the Estádio Nacional, Lisbon

Inter had won the European Cup in two of the previous three seasons, 1964 and 1965. Pre-match talk focused on Inter winning a famous tripletta of European Cups and they were considered strong favourites going into the game.

Inter were very well known for using a defensive tactic, the Catenaccio, which meant that they won many matches by slim scorelines and rarely conceded. Their manager, Helenio Herrera, was the highest paid in Europe and was considered to be the catalyst of their success. By contrast Celtic were an attacking team. Before the match their manager Jock Stein said that, "Celtic will be the first team to bring the European Cup back to Britain... we are going to attack as we have never attacked before,"

Inter's most important player, Spanish international and Ballon d'Or winner Luis Suarez, missed the match with an injury. He was replaced by veteran Mauro Bicicli, a player with very few appearances in the season, and the loss of their star in the middle of the field would prove decisive in shaping Inter's destiny in the match, and also Jair missed the match for injury.

One of Celtic's most important players, striker Joe McBride was to miss the match. He had suffered a long-term knee injury and his last match of the season was on 24 December 1966. McBride would definitely have played had he been fit. He was in such good form for Celtic that, despite missing half the season, McBride finished as the top scorer in Scotland that year with 35 goals in 26 appearances.

Both Inter and Celtic had been performing well domestically throughout the season. Only a few days before the final Inter had been on the verge of winning a historic treble but losses in their last two games knocked them out of the semi-finals of the Coppa Italia and cost them the Scudetto. The European Cup was the last chance for them to redeem what had initially been such a promising season. Celtic came into the final having already won the Scottish Division One, the Scottish Cup and the Scottish League Cup as well as the Glasgow Cup earlier in the season.

=== Summary ===
Inter had the first attack of the match, with Renato Cappellini running down the wing and supplying a cross to Sandro Mazzola whose header hit Celtic goalkeeper Ronnie Simpson's knees. Inter won a penalty minutes later when Jim Craig fouled Cappellini in the box, and Mazzola converted to put Inter in front after only six minutes. Once they had taken the lead, Inter retreated back into their defensive style, which allowed Celtic to attack. However, they struggled to get through Inter's defensive wall and were mainly restricted to long shots from outside the box. Bertie Auld hit the crossbar, then a cross from Jimmy Johnstone was gathered up by Giuliano Sarti, who then tipped a header from the same player over the crossbar. Inter pulled nine men back, but Celtic kept attacking them. Tommy Gemmell's dangerous free-kick was saved by Sarti, he then speculatively attempted to lob the Inter 'keeper and hit the bar. Despite Celtic's inability to break through their opponents defence they were in complete control of the match and Inter were not able to attack. Inter had not had another chance since their goal, whilst Celtic found themselves foiled time and again by outstanding goalkeeping from Sarti.

After just over an hour, Gemmell finally managed to equalise for Celtic when Craig passed to him from the right wing and he scored with a powerful 25 yard shot. The balance of play remained the same with Inter defending deeply against sustained Celtic attacking. With about five minutes remaining, a long-range shot from Bobby Murdoch was diverted by Stevie Chalmers past a wrong-footed Sarti – rather than an instinctive intervention, Chalmers and his teammates asserted that they had practiced the same move many times in training. This proved to be the winning goal.

=== Details ===
25 May 1967
17:30 WEST

Inter Milan (Italy)	1–2	(Scotland) Celtic
Mazzola 7' (pen.)	Report	Gemmell 63'; Chalmers 84'

Estádio Nacional, Lisbon
Attendance: 45,000
Referee: Kurt Tschenscher (West Germany)

Inter Milan	Celtic

GK	1	(Italy) Giuliano Sarti
SW	6	(Italy) Armando Picchi (c)
RB	2	(Italy) Tarcisio Burgnich
CB	5	(Italy) Aristide Guarneri
LB	3	(Italy) Giacinto Facchetti
CM	4	(Italy) Gianfranco Bedin
CM	8	(Italy) Sandro Mazzola 7' (pen.)
CM	10	(Italy) Mauro Bicicli
RW	7	(Italy) Angelo Domenghini
CF	9	(Italy) Renato Cappellini
LW	11	(Italy) Mario Corso
Substitute:
GK	12	(Italy) Ferdinando Miniussi
Manager:
(Argentina) Helenio Herrera

GK	1	(Scotland) Ronnie Simpson
RB	2	(Scotland) Jim Craig
CB	5	(Scotland) Billy McNeill (c)
CB	6	(Scotland) John Clark
LB	3	(Scotland) Tommy Gemmell 63'
CM	4	(Scotland) Bobby Murdoch
CM	10	(Scotland) Bertie Auld
RW	7	(Scotland) Jimmy Johnstone
CF	9	(Scotland) Stevie Chalmers 84'
CF	8	(Scotland) Willie Wallace
LW	11	(Scotland) Bobby Lennox
Substitute:
GK	12	(Scotland) John Fallon
Manager:
(Scotland) Jock Stein

Assistant referees:
Rudibert Jacobi (West Germany)
Rudolf Eisemann (West Germany)

== Post-match ==
After the final whistle, there was a pitch invasion by Celtic fans, which meant that the Celtic team could not be presented the trophy on the pitch. Some of the Celtic players also had their shirts taken by Celtic supporters. Celtic captain Billy McNeill had to be ushered around the outside of the stadium under armed guards to receive the trophy on a podium in the stand.

Inter's loss in the final is considered to be the downfall of "La Grande Inter", the greatest period of success in the club's history. They had been one of the top teams in Europe for the previous three years, however, failed to recover from their bad season in which they lost out to Celtic as well as in their two domestic competitions. They finished the following season trophyless again and Helenio Herrera, the manager who was considered to be the catalyst of their success, then left the club.

Celtic's attacking style play against Inter's catenaccio was heralded as a win for football. Inter manager Helenio Herrera said that "We can have no complaints. Celtic deserved their victory. We were beaten by Celtic's force. Although we lost, the match was a victory for sport." while one Portuguese official said "This attacking play, this is the real meaning of football. This is the true game.". The Portuguese newspaper, Mundo Desportivo, said "It was inevitable. Sooner or later the Inter of Herrera, the Inter of catenaccio, of negative football, of marginal victories, had to pay for their refusal to play entertaining football."

Celtic manager Jock Stein received widespread praise following the final. Liverpool manager Bill Shankly said to him after the match, "John, you're immortal now". Since the match a stand has been named after him at Celtic Park and he was appointed a Commander of the Order of the British Empire. Stein is considered by many, including Alex Ferguson, to be the greatest ever Scottish manager, with his victory in the final being one of the main reasons for this.

The Celtic team from that year has also received much recognition. They have become known as the Lisbon Lions and are widely considered the greatest team in Celtic's history. All of Celtic's players were born within a 30-mile radius of Glasgow. In 2000, Celtic named a stand at Celtic Park after the Lisbon Lions. They also won the BBC Sports Personality Team of the Year Award in 1967.

== See also ==
- 1966–67 Inter Milan season
- 1966–67 Celtic F.C. season
- 1967 European Cup Winners' Cup final
- 1967 Inter-Cities Fairs Cup final
- 1967 Intercontinental Cup
- Inter Milan in international football
- Celtic F.C. in international football
