= Bobby Murdoch =

Scottish footballer (1944–2001)

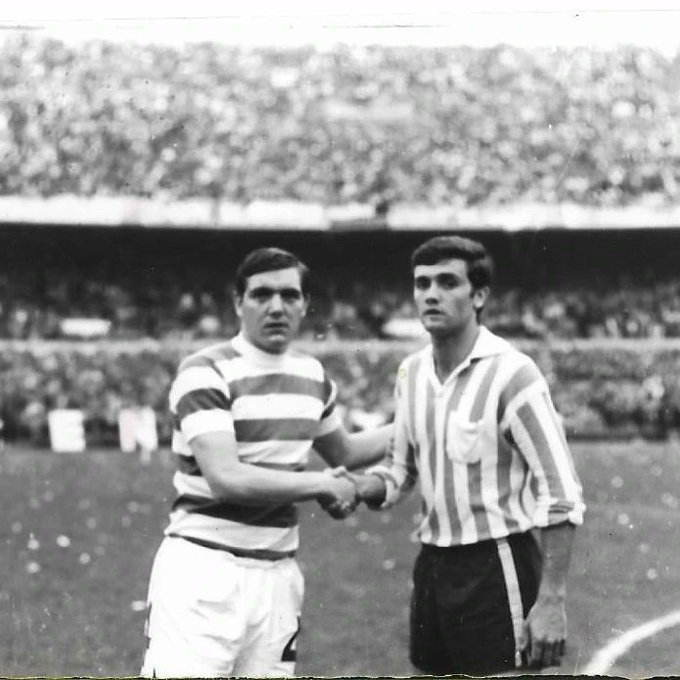
- Murdoch (left) shaking hands with Roberto Perfumo prior to the second match of the 1967 Intercontinental Cup

Personal information
- Full name: Robert White Murdoch
- Date of birth: 17 August 1944
- Place of birth: Bothwell, Scotland
- Date of death: 15 May 2001 (aged 56)
- Place of death: Glasgow, Scotland
- Height: 5 ft 10 in (1.78 m)
- Position: Midfielder

Senior career*
Years	Team	Apps	(Gls)
1959–1973	Celtic	291	(61)
1959–1961	→ Cambuslang Rangers (loan)		
1973–1976	Middlesbrough	95	(6)
Total		386	(67)

International career
1964	Scotland U23	1	(0)
1965–1969	Scotland	12	(6)
1965–1969	Scottish League XI	5	(0)

Managerial career
- 1981–1982: Middlesbrough
- * Club domestic league appearances and goals

Robert White Murdoch (17 August 1944 – 15 May 2001) was a Scottish professional footballer, who played as a midfielder for Celtic, Middlesbrough and Scotland. Murdoch was one of the Lisbon Lions, the Celtic team who won the European Cup in 1967. He later also managed Middlesbrough.

== Club career ==
=== Celtic ===
Brought up in Rutherglen, he lived there for most of his life and attended local St. Columbkillle's Primary school (a classmate was Tommy McAvoy who went on to become the long-serving MP for the area), before moving to Our Lady's High Secondary in Motherwell. Murdoch first joined Celtic in 1959, earning £3 per week as a part-time player while also being employed as a sheet-metal worker. He played for junior club Cambuslang Rangers for two years to gain experience before joining Celtic as a full-time professional.

Murdoch initially played for Celtic as an inside right, but only showed signs of being a reasonable performer in that position. This was in a period where players were not well developed by Celtic due to a lack of quality coaching. Jock Stein moved Murdoch to right half soon after he was appointed Celtic manager in 1965. With that simple action, Murdoch was the first player to significantly benefit from Stein's arrival. Playing in the deeper position allowed Murdoch to use his long passing ability more effectively. He still continued to score a handful of goals a season, knocking in shots from cutbacks by Bertie Auld or Jimmy Johnstone.

During his time at Celtic, he won eight Scottish League titles, four Scottish Cups and five League Cups, as well as the 1967 European Cup Final winners' medal. Murdoch's shot was deflected by Stevie Chalmers to score Celtic's winning goal. Murdoch also played in the 1970 European Cup Final, when Celtic lost 2–1 to Feyenoord. In total, he made over 500 appearances for Celtic and scored approximately 100 goals.

His later years with Celtic were marked with injury problems, as Murdoch had difficulty maintaining his weight at a correct level. Murdoch was voted Scottish player of the year in 1969 by the football writers. Jock Stein credited Murdoch with being "just about the best player I had as a manager". Stein allowed Murdoch to leave the club because he had "run out of challenges" at Celtic.

=== Middlesbrough ===
Murdoch left Celtic in 1973 and joined Middlesbrough on a free transfer as Jack Charlton's first signing. He provided advice to the young Graeme Souness and the club was promoted to Division One in his first season there. He made 125 appearances for Middlesbrough before his playing retirement in 1976. Murdoch then took up the role of coaching Middlesbrough youth players. He had a brief, unsuccessful, spell as manager of Middlesbrough between 1981 and 1982. Murdoch left the club shortly after it was relegated to Division Two. His job at Middlesbrough had been made difficult by the fact that the club had sold star players such as Craig Johnston, David Armstrong and Mark Proctor.

== International career ==
Murdoch won a total of 12 caps for Scotland, having to compete for selection with Jim Baxter and then Billy Bremner among others. His debut was in a 1–0 victory against Italy on 9 October 1965 during 1966 FIFA World Cup qualification. His first two international goals came in his second cap, a 4–1 British Home Championship victory against Wales in the same month. He scored six international goals in total, including the equaliser in a 1–1 draw against West Germany in 1970 FIFA World Cup qualification.

== Style of play ==
A physically strong player who originally started out as an inside right, Murdoch flourished as a playmaker in the midfield under the leadership of Celtic manager Jock Stein, with teammate Bertie Auld as his partner. Murdoch was known for his accurate and precise passing of the ball, either short or long, that split opponents' defences. Aside from his accurate passing, Murdoch possessed great technique and control, could tackle and was able to shoot and pass with either foot.

Fellow Celtic player Jim Craig noted Murdoch's influence on Celtic's efficiency as a team, stating: "When Bobby Murdoch played, the whole Celtic team played."

== Later life, death and legacy ==
Murdoch had an unsuccessful spell as a publican that ended in debt. In 1995, Murdoch won a legal case in a Medical Appeal Tribunal that an ankle injury he had sustained playing for Celtic was an industrial injury, entitling him to compensation from the state. In his last years he had a role helping at Celtic Park with match-day hospitality.

He died, aged 56, following a stroke, in the Glasgow Victoria Infirmary. He was survived by Kathleen – his wife since 1964 – and by a daughter and two sons. Murdoch was the first of the Lisbon Lions to die. In 2016 his contribution was recognised with the unveiling of a plaque listing his achievements at the town hall in his hometown of Rutherglen; the ceremony was attended by family members, local dignitaries and former teammates.

Murdoch's younger brothers Billy and James were also footballers; Billy was a reserve player at Celtic while Bobby was in the first team, and later played for Stenhousemuir and Kilmarnock. James a.k.a. Jimmy was also on Celtic's books as a youth before signing provisionally with Cardiff City, and played at Junior level for Cumbernauld United.

== Career statistics ==
=== Club ===
Appearances and goals by club, season and competition
Club	Season	League			National cup (Note: Includes Scottish Cup, FA Cup.)		League cup (Note: Includes Scottish League Cup, Football League Cup.)		Continental		Other (Note: Includes Glasgow Cup (several years), the 1967–68 Intercontinental Cup and 1972–73 Drybrough Cup.)		Total	
Club	Season	Division	Apps	Goals	Apps	Goals	Apps	Goals	Apps	Goals	Apps	Goals	Apps	Goals
Celtic	1962–63	Scottish Division One	19	4	6	5	6	2	0	0	3	3	34	14
Celtic	1963–64	Scottish Division One	26	15	3	1	3	0	7	3	5	2	44	21
Celtic	1964–65	Scottish Division One	32	8	6	0	9	5	4	2	3	1	54	16
Celtic	1965–66	Scottish Division One	31	5	7	2	11	2	8	2	0	0	57	11
Celtic	1966–67	Scottish Division One	31	4	4	2	10	2	9	0	3	0	57	8
Celtic	1967–68	Scottish Division One	34	6	1	0	9	2	2	0	4	1	50	9
Celtic	1968–69	Scottish Division One	30	4	7	2	8	1	5	1	0	0	50	8
Celtic	1969–70	Scottish Division One	26	5	5	0	6	0	7	1	2	0	46	6
Celtic	1970–71	Scottish Division One	23	2	1	0	8	0	4	2	2	1	38	5
Celtic	1971–72	Scottish Division One	15	4	6	1	6	0	6	0	0	0	33	5
Celtic	1972–73	Scottish Division One	24	4	7	0	7	3	2	0	3	0	43	7
Celtic	1973–74	Scottish Division One	0	0	0	0	1	0	0	0	0	0	1	0
Celtic	Total		291	61	53	13	84	17	54	11	25	8	507	110
Middlesbrough	1973–74	Second Division	34	5	2	0	3	0	0	0	0	0	39	5
Middlesbrough	1974–75	First Division	39	1	4	1	4	0	0	0	0	0	47	2
Middlesbrough	1975–76	First Division	22	0	1	0	6	0	0	0	0	0	29	0
Middlesbrough	Total		95	6	7	1	13	0	0	0	0	0	115	7
Career total			386	67	60	14	97	17	54	11	25	8	622	117

=== International ===
Appearances and goals by national team and year
National team	Year	Apps	Goals
Scotland	1965	3	2
Scotland	1966	2	1
Scotland	1967	1	0
Scotland	1968	1	2
Scotland	1969	5	1
Total		12	6

Scores and results list Scotland's goal tally first, score column indicates score after each Murdoch goal.

List of international goals scored by Bobby Murdoch
No.	Date	Venue	Opponent	Score	Result	Competition
1	24 November 1965	Hampden Park, Glasgow, Scotland	Wales	1–0	4–1	1965–66 British Home Championship
2	24 November 1965	Hampden Park, Glasgow, Scotland	Wales	3–1	4–1	1965–66 British Home Championship
3	16 November 1966	Hampden Park, Glasgow, Scotland	Northern Ireland	1–1	2–1	1966–67 British Home Championship/Euro 1968 Qualifiers
4	11 December 1968	GSP Stadium, Nicosia, Cyprus	Cyprus	2–0	5–0	1970 World Cup Qualifiers
5	11 December 1968	GSP Stadium, Nicosia, Cyprus	Cyprus	4–0	5–0	1970 World Cup Qualifiers
6	16 April 1969	Hampden Park, Glasgow, Scotland	West Germany	1–1	1–1	1970 World Cup Qualifiers

== Honours ==
Celtic

- European Cup: 1966–67; runner-up 1969–70
- Intercontinental Cup: runner-up 1967
- Scottish League Championship (8): 1965–66, 1966–67, 1967–68, 1968–69, 1969–70, 1970–71, 1971–72, 1972–73
- Scottish Cup (5): 1964–65, 1966–67, 1968–69, 1970–71, 1971–72
- Scottish League Cup (5): 1965–66, 1966–67, 1967–68, 1968–69, 1969–70
- Glasgow Cup (5): 1963–64, 1964–65, 1966–67, 1967–68, 1969–70

Middlesbrough

- Football League Second Division: 1973–74

Scotland

- British Home Championship: 1966–67

Individual

- Scottish Football Writers' Player of the Year: 1968–69
- Scottish Football Hall of Fame: posthumous inductee 2004
