= 1966–67 in Scottish football =

Division One champions
- Celtic

Division Two champions
- Morton

Scottish Cup winners
- Celtic

League Cup winners
- Celtic

Junior Cup winners
- Kilsyth Rangers

Teams in Europe
- Celtic, Dunfermline Athletic, Dundee United, Kilmarnock, Rangers

Scotland national team
- 1967 BHC/UEFA Euro 1968 qualifying

The 1966–67 season was the 94th season of competitive football in Scotland and the 70th season of Scottish league football.

== Overview ==
A number of significant events occurred during the season. The domestic campaign was dominated by Celtic, who along with winning all 5 tournaments they entered, became the first British team to win the European Cup; the great Celtic team who achieved this were later nicknamed the Lisbon Lions.

1966–67 was arguably Scottish football's best ever season in European football, with Rangers reaching the final of the Cup Winners Cup and Kilmarnock reaching the Fairs Cup semi-finals. In addition, Dundee United marked their European debut by eliminating Fairs Cup holders Barcelona.

It was also a season in which the Scottish national team recorded one of their most celebrated victories, beating greatest rivals and World Cup holders England 3–2 at Wembley in the British Home Championship.

The season also marked the league debut of Clydebank, while it was the final appearance of Third Lanark, one of the founding members of the SFA and Scottish League, who went out of business in the summer of 1967.

== Scottish League Division One ==
Celtic were champions for the second season running, losing only two matches, both to Dundee United; these were Celtic's only defeats against Scottish opposition during the entire season. They won the title at Ibrox, home of arch-rivals Rangers, in a 2–2 draw which meant they could no longer be caught (it was Rangers' final match of the season while Celtic had one more fixture to fulfil).

Clyde finished third, which is their highest ever league placing. Clyde did not qualify for Europe, however, because Rangers finished second and took the Inter-Cities Fairs Cup place.

St Mirren and Ayr United were relegated, meaning the former would be outside the top flight for the first time since 1936. Ayr managed only one league win during the whole campaign, and had to wait until April to record it.

Pos	Team	Pld	W	D	L	GF	GA	GD	Pts	Qualification
1	Celtic	34	26	6	2	111	33	+78	58	
2	Rangers	34	24	7	3	92	31	+61	55	
3	Clyde	34	20	6	8	64	48	+16	46	
4	Aberdeen	34	17	8	9	72	38	+34	42	
5	Hibernian	34	19	4	11	72	49	+23	42	
6	Dundee	34	16	9	9	74	51	+23	41	
7	Kilmarnock	34	16	8	10	59	46	+13	40	
8	Dunfermline Athletic	34	14	10	10	72	52	+20	38	
9	Dundee United	34	14	9	11	68	62	+6	37	
10	Motherwell	34	10	11	13	59	60	−1	31	
11	Hearts	34	11	8	15	39	48	−9	30	
12	Partick Thistle	34	9	12	13	49	68	−19	30	
13	Airdrieonians	34	11	6	17	41	53	−12	28	
14	Falkirk	34	11	4	19	33	70	−37	26	
15	St Johnstone	34	10	5	19	53	73	−20	25	
16	Stirling Albion	34	5	9	20	31	85	−54	19	
17	St Mirren (R)	34	4	7	23	25	81	−56	15	Relegated to the Second Division
18	Ayr United (R)	34	1	7	26	20	86	−66	9	Relegated to the Second Division

Source: RSSSF
(R) Relegated

=== Top scorer ===
- Stevie Chalmers (Celtic) 21

== Scottish League Division Two ==
Morton, relegated the previous year, made an immediate return to Division One. They won the title by an eleven-point margin from Raith Rovers, who were also promoted.

Clydebank, who had been established as a separate senior club in 1965 following their ill-fated merger with East Stirlingshire, were elected to the Scottish League in 1966, and finished third from bottom in their inaugural season.

Financially troubled Third Lanark finished in mid-table, but they dropped out of the Scottish League and folded, going into liquidation in the summer: they were the first League team to fold since 1933. The final league match for Third Lanark was a 5–1 defeat at Dumbarton on 28 April 1967.

Brechin City finished bottom of the league for the fourth time in six seasons.

Pos	Team	Pld	W	D	L	GF	GA	GD	Pts	Promotion or relegation
1	Morton	38	33	3	2	113	20	+93	69	Promotion to the 1967–68 First Division
2	Raith Rovers	38	27	4	7	95	44	+51	58	Promotion to the 1967–68 First Division
3	Arbroath	38	25	7	6	75	32	+43	57	
4	Hamilton Academical	38	18	8	12	74	60	+14	44	
5	East Fife	38	19	4	15	70	63	+7	42	
6	Cowdenbeath	38	16	8	14	70	55	+15	40	
7	Queen's Park	38	15	10	13	78	68	+10	40	
8	Albion Rovers	38	17	6	15	66	62	+4	40	
9	Queen of the South	38	15	9	14	84	76	+8	39	
10	Berwick Rangers	38	16	6	16	63	55	+8	38	
11	Third Lanark	38	13	8	17	67	78	−11	34	Club folded
12	Montrose	38	13	8	17	63	77	−14	34	
13	Alloa	38	15	4	19	55	74	−19	34	
14	Dumbarton	38	12	9	17	56	64	−8	33	
15	Stranraer	38	13	7	18	57	73	−16	33	
16	Forfar Athletic	38	12	3	23	74	106	−32	27	
17	Stenhousemuir	38	9	9	20	62	104	−42	27	
18	Clydebank	38	8	8	22	59	92	−33	24	
19	East Stirlingshire	38	7	10	21	44	87	−43	24	
20	Brechin City	38	8	7	23	58	93	−35	23	

Source: "1966-1967 Second Division - SPFL Archive". SPFL (in Malay).

== Cup honours ==
=== Scottish Cup ===
The first round produced one of the largest upsets in the history of the competition when Division Two outfit Berwick Rangers eliminated holders Rangers 1–0 at Shielfield, with Sammy Reid scoring the game's only goal.

That result meant Celtic became clear favourites to lift the trophy, and they began with comfortable victories over Arbroath, Elgin City and Queen's Park. They then overcame Clyde in a replayed semi-final to set up a final meeting with Aberdeen, who had eliminated Dundee United at the penultimate stage. A 2–0 victory in the final saw Celtic lift the Cup for the 19th time, equalling Rangers' record in the competition.

Scottish Cup Final

29 April 1967

Celtic	2–0	Aberdeen
Wallace

Hampden Park
Attendance: 127,117
Referee: W Syme, Glasgow

=== League Cup ===
Celtic picked up their first trophy of the season courtesy of a 1–0 win against oldest rivals Rangers in the final. After winning all six matches in a section including Hearts, Clyde and St Mirren, Celtic also eliminated Dunfermline and, in the semi-finals, Airdrieonians on their way to the final. The other semi saw Rangers beat Aberdeen in a replay.

League Cup Final

29 October 1966

Celtic	1–0	Rangers
Lennox

Hampden Park
Attendance: 94,532
Referee: T Wharton, Glasgow

=== Individual honours ===
Award	Winner	Club
Footballer of the Year	(Scotland) Ronnie Simpson	Celtic

== Scottish clubs in Europe ==
Celtic made their debut in the European Cup and exceeded all expectations by lifting the trophy with a memorable victory over Inter Milan in the final in Lisbon, thanks to goals from Tommy Gemmell and Stevie Chalmers. Their achievement ended the stranglehold which Latin teams had hitherto exerted on the competition, as Celtic became not only the first Scottish champions of Europe, but indeed the first British and Northern European ones also. The Lisbon Lions, as they became known, remain the only Scottish side to have won the European Cup.

In a notably successful season for Scottish clubs in Europe, Rangers had the chance to win Glasgow's second continental trophy within a week after reaching the Cup Winners Cup final for the second time, only to narrowly lose out to Bayern Munich in Nuremberg. Earlier in May there had been the possibility of Scottish involvement in the final of all three European tournaments, but Kilmarnock lost out to Leeds United in their Fairs Cup semi-final meeting. It remains the club's best European run.

Dundee United had a remarkable introduction to European football; drawn against Fairs Cup holders Barcelona, United eliminated the Spaniards with victories in both legs. Of Scotland's five representatives, only Dunfermline failed to make any great impact, losing to eventual winners Dinamo Zagreb in the Fairs Cup second round.

=== Celtic ===
Date	Venue	Opponents	Score	Competition	Celtic scorer(s)
28 September 1966	Celtic Park, Glasgow (H)	(Switzerland) FC Zürich	2–0	EC1	Gemmell, McBride
5 October 1966	Letzigrund, Zürich (A)	(Switzerland) FC Zürich	3–0	EC1	Gemmell (2 (1 pen)), Chalmers
30 November 1966	Stade Marcel Saupin, Nantes (A)	(France) FC Nantes	3–1	EC2	McBride, Lennox, Chalmers
7 December 1966	Celtic Park, Glasgow (H)	(France) FC Nantes	3–1	EC2	Johnstone, Chalmers, Lennox
1 March 1967	Stadium of Vojvodina, Novi Sad (A)	(Socialist Federal Republic of Yugoslavia) FK Vojvodina	0–1	ECQF	
8 March 1967	Celtic Park, Glasgow (H)	(Socialist Federal Republic of Yugoslavia) FK Vojvodina	2–0	ECQF	Chalmers, McNeill
12 April 1967	Celtic Park, Glasgow (H)	(Czechoslovakia) Dukla Prague	3–1	ECSF	Johnstone, Wallace (2)
25 April 1967	Stadion Juliska, Prague (A)	(Czechoslovakia) Dukla Prague	0–0	ECSF	
25 May 1967	Estádio Nacional, Oeiras (N)	(Italy) Inter Milan	2–1	EC Final	Gemmell, Chalmers

=== Rangers ===
Date	Venue	Opponents	Score	Competition	Rangers scorer(s)
27 September 1966	The Oval, Belfast (A)	(Northern Ireland) Glentoran	1–1	CWC1	McLean
5 October 1966	Ibrox Park, Glasgow (H)	(Northern Ireland) Glentoran	4–0	CWC1	McLean, Johnston, D. Smith, Setterington
23 November 1966	Ibrox Park, Glasgow (H)	(West Germany) Borussia Dortmund	2–1	CWC2	Johansen, A. Smith
6 December 1966	Rote Erde Stadion, Dortmund (A)	(West Germany) Borussia Dortmund	0–0	CWC2	
1 March 1967	Ibrox Park, Glasgow (H)	(Spain) Real Zaragoza	2–0	CWCQF	D. Smith, Willoughby
22 March 1967	La Romareda, Zaragoza (A)	(Spain) Real Zaragoza	0–2 *	CWCQF	
19 April 1967	Ovcha Kupel Stadium, Sofia (A)	(Bulgaria) Slavia Sofia	1–0	CWCSF	D. Smith
3 May 1967	Ibrox Park, Glasgow (H)	(Bulgaria) Slavia Sofia	1–0	CWCSF	Henderson
31 May 1967	Frankenstadion, Nuremberg (N)	(West Germany) Bayern Munich	0–1 (a.e.t.)	CWC Final	

* Rangers progressed on a coin flip.

=== Dundee United ===
Date	Venue	Opponents	Score	Competition	Dundee United scorer(s)
25 October 1966	Camp Nou, Barcelona (A)	(Spain) Barcelona	2–1	FC2	Hainey, Seemann
16 November 1966	Tannadice Park, Dundee (H)	(Spain) Barcelona	2–0	FC2	Mitchell, Hainey
8 February 1967	Stadio Comunale, Turin (A)	(Italy) Juventus	0–3	FC3	
8 March 1967	Tannadice Park, Dundee (H)	(Italy) Juventus	1–0	FC3	Døssing

=== Dunfermline Athletic ===
Date	Venue	Opponents	Score	Competition	Dunfermline scorer(s)
24 August 1966	Unknown, Oslo (A)	(Norway) Frigg Oslo	3–1	FC1	Fleming (2), T. Callaghan
28 September 1966	East End Park, Dunfermline (H)	(Norway) Frigg Oslo	3–1	FC1	Delaney (2), T. Callaghan
26 October 1966	East End Park, Dunfermline (H)	(Socialist Federal Republic of Yugoslavia) Dinamo Zagreb	4–2	FC2	Delaney, Edwards (pen.), Ferguson (2)
2 November 1966	Maksimir Stadium, Zagreb (A)	(Socialist Federal Republic of Yugoslavia) Dinamo Zagreb	0–2	FC2	

=== Kilmarnock ===
Date	Venue	Opponents	Score	Competition	Kilmarnock scorer(s)
25 October 1966	Bosuilstadion, Antwerp (A)	(Belgium) Royal Antwerp	1–0	FC2	Mclnally
2 November 1966	Rugby Park, Kilmarnock (H)	(Belgium) Royal Antwerp	7–2	FC2	Mclnally (2) Queen (2, 2 pens) McLean (2, 1 pen.), C. Watson
14 December 1966	Rugby Park, Kilmarnock (H)	(Belgium) AA Gent	1–0	FC3	Murray
21 December 1966	Jules Ottenstadion, Ghent (A)	(Belgium) AA Gent	2–1 (a.e.t.)	FC3	McInally, McLean
19 April 1967	Bruno-Plache-Stadion, Leipzig (A)	(East Germany) Lokomotive Leipzig	0–1	FCQF	
26 April 1967	Rugby Park, Kilmarnock (H)	(East Germany) Lokomotive Leipzig	2–0	FCQF	McFadzean, McIlroy
19 May 1967	Elland Road, Leeds (A)	(England) Leeds United	2–4	FCSM	McIlroy (2)
25 May 1967	Rugby Park, Kilmarnock (H)	(England) Leeds United	0–0	FCSM	

== Other honours ==
=== National ===
Competition	Winner	Score	Runner-up
Scottish Qualifying Cup - North	Elgin City	5 – 4 *	Nairn County
Scottish Qualifying Cup - South	Hawick Royal Albert	8 – 2 *	Tarff Rovers

=== County ===
Competition	Winner	Score	Runner-up
Aberdeenshire Cup	Keith		
East of Scotland Shield	Hibernian	2 – 1	Hearts
Fife Cup	Raith Rovers	5 – 1	East Fife
Forfarshire Cup	Dundee	4 – 3	Dundee United
Glasgow Cup	Celtic	4 – 0	Partick Thistle
Lanarkshire Cup	Airdrie	2 – 1	Hamilton
Renfrewshire Cup	St Mirren	3 – 2 *	Morton
Stirlingshire Cup	Falkirk	5 – 1	Stenhousemuir

^{*} - aggregate over two legs

=== Highland League ===
Top Three
Pos	Team	Pld	W	D	L	GF	GA	GD	Pts
1	Ross County	30	24	4	2	107	32	+75	52
2	Elgin City	30	19	9	2	111	37	+74	47
3	Inverness Caledonian	30	21	3	6	101	54	+47	45

== Scotland national team ==
Unbeaten Scotland became outright British champions for the first time in four years. Following a draw in Cardiff and victory at home to Northern Ireland, Scotland travelled to Wembley needing to beat England, who had won both their matches, to take the title. This was secured with a 3–2 win which has become legendary in Scottish football, not only because it was England's first defeat since becoming world champions the previous year, but due to Scotland's assured performance and the skillful arrogance of Jim Baxter, who at various times juggled the ball by himself.

At the same time, Scotland's Home Championship win got Scotland off to a good start in their first attempt to qualify for the European Championships, with this and the following season's tourney doubling as qualifying matches for the 1968 finals.

Scotland had begun the season with Kilmarnock manager Malky McDonald in temporary charge for the games against Wales and Northern Ireland. Bobby Brown was then appointed as the national team's first full-time manager, with the England match proving to be a memorable start to his tenure.

Date	Venue	Opponents	Score	Competition	Scotland scorer(s)
22 October 1966	Ninian Park, Cardiff (A)	Wales	1–1	BHC / ECQG8	Denis Law
16 November 1966	Hampden Park, Glasgow (H)	Northern Ireland	2–1	BHC / ECQG8	Bobby Murdoch, Bobby Lennox
15 April 1967	Wembley Stadium, London (A)	England	3–2	BHC / ECQG8	Denis Law, Bobby Lennox, Jim McCalliog
10 May 1967	Hampden Park, Glasgow (H)	Soviet Union	0–2	Friendly	

Key:

- (H) = Home match
- (A) = Away match
- ECQG8 = European Championship qualifying - Group 8
- BHC = British Home Championship
