= Billy McNeill =

Scottish footballer and manager (1940–2019)

Billy McNeill MBE
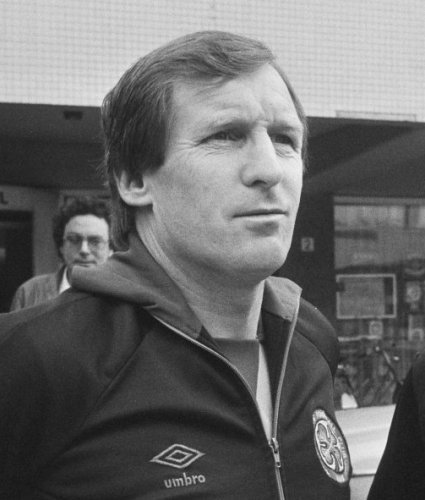
- McNeill as Celtic manager in 1982

Personal information
- Full name: William McNeill
- Date of birth: 2 March 1940
- Place of birth: Mossend, Scotland
- Date of death: 22 April 2019 (aged 79)
- Place of death: Newton Mearns, Scotland
- Position: Defender

Youth career
- –1957: Blantyre Victoria

Senior career*
Years	Team	Apps	(Gls)
–1957	Blantyre Victoria		
1957–1975	Celtic	486	(22)

International career
1960–1962	Scotland U23	5	(0)
1961	SFA trial v SFL	1	(0)
1961–1967	Scottish League XI	9	(0)
1961–1972	Scotland	29	(3)

Managerial career
- 1977: Clyde
- 1977–1978: Aberdeen
- 1978–1983: Celtic
- 1983–1986: Manchester City
- 1986–1987: Aston Villa
- 1987–1991: Celtic
- 1998: Hibernian (caretaker)
- * Club domestic league appearances and goals

William McNeill MBE (2 March 1940 – 22 April 2019) was a Scottish football player and manager. He had a long association with Celtic, spanning more than sixty years as a player, manager and club ambassador. McNeill captained Celtic's 'Lisbon Lions' to their European Cup victory in 1967 and later spent two spells as the club's manager. As a player and manager, he won 31 major trophies with Celtic.

A defender, McNeill played for Celtic for his entire senior career, and holds the club record for most appearances, a total of 822 games over 18 seasons. He was captain during their most successful era in the 1960s and 70s. The club won nine consecutive Scottish league championships and thirteen other major domestic trophies in this time, and in 1967 became the first British club to win the European Cup. He also played 29 times for Scotland.

McNeill managed Celtic for nine seasons, from 1978 to 1983 and 1987 to 1991, winning four Scottish league championships. This included a league and cup double in 1987–88, the club's centenary season. He also managed Clyde, Aberdeen, Manchester City and Aston Villa. In 2015, Celtic installed a statue outside Celtic Park of McNeill holding aloft the European Cup, an iconic image in their history.

== Early life ==
McNeill was born on 2 March 1940 in Bellshill, Lanarkshire. His father was a soldier in the Black Watch and later the Army Physical Training Corps. Aged nine, McNeill moved to Hereford in England where his father was posted, and stayed for two and a half years. Although he already liked football, he enjoyed playing rugby union in his time there.

He moved to Motherwell and excelled playing football as centre-half at Our Lady's High School. His schoolboy performances led to him signing for the junior team Blantyre Victoria.

== Playing career ==
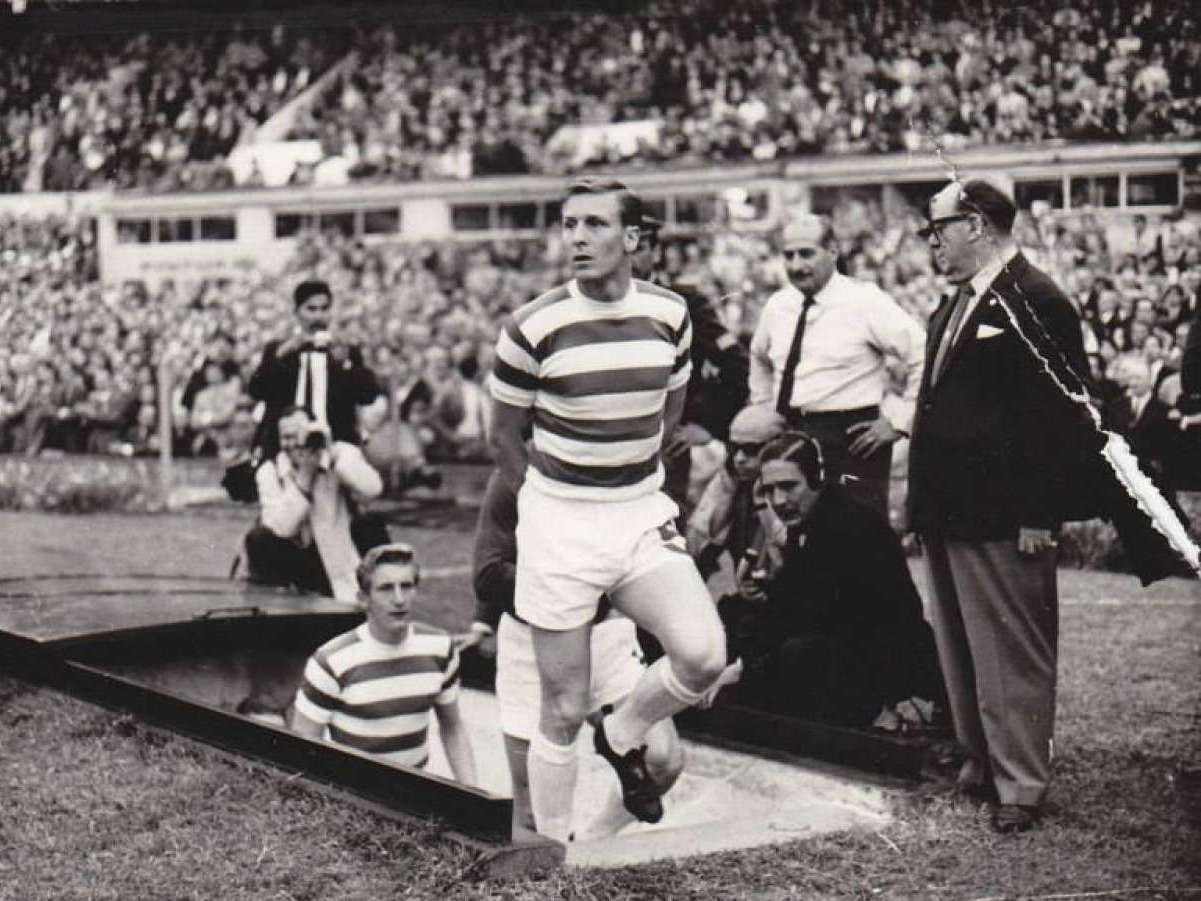
McNeill (front) leaving the tunnel of the Argentine Racing Club stadium for the 1967 Intercontinental Cup.

McNeill was signed by Celtic for £250 in 1957 after then reserve team coach Jock Stein saw him playing for Scotland schoolboys against England. He was given the nickname Cesar after the actor Cesar Romero.

In his early career, Celtic endured some of their most difficult times, and did not win a trophy for eight years. After Stein became manager in 1965, however, the club's fortunes improved. In the 1965 Scottish Cup final, Celtic defeated Dunfermline 3–2, with McNeill scoring the winning goal. In that season he was named Scottish Footballer of the Year, the first year it was awarded.

With McNeill as captain, Celtic enjoyed their most successful period, dominating Scottish football and regularly competing in the latter stages of European competitions. They won nine Scottish League championships in a row, as well as seven Scottish Cups and six Scottish League Cups.

Celtic's greatest season was in 1966–67, when they won every competition they entered; as well as a domestic treble and the Glasgow Cup, McNeill led the team to victory in the 1967 European Cup Final. The team, which became known as the 'Lisbon Lions,' defeated Inter Milan 2–1 and McNeill (whose last minute goal, a characteristic header from a set piece, had ensured progression against Vojvodina Novi Sad in the quarter-final) was the first British footballer to lift the trophy. He also became the first player to captain his side to the European Treble, and remains the only captain to win the fabled Quadruple.

Following another domestic treble in 1968–69, in which another McNeill headed goal set his team on the way to a 4–0 win over Rangers in the Scottish Cup Final, Celtic again reached the European Cup final in 1970, this time losing to Feyenoord.

McNeill retired as a player in 1975, having made a club record 822 (Note: This total is sometimes given as 790. 822 includes 32 games in minor competitions, including the Glasgow Cup, Drybrough Cup and the Anglo-Scottish Cup.) appearances for Celtic and never being substituted. He won 29 caps for Scotland, scoring 3 goals, and also played 9 times for the Scottish League XI.

== Managerial career ==
After retiring as a player, McNeill began coaching Celtic Boys Club's under 16 team. He began his management career at Clyde in April 1977, before moving to Aberdeen two months later. McNeill recorded four wins, three draws from eight league matches and recorded a total of 11 out of a possible 16 points at Clyde. His last match in charge was a Glasgow Cup semi-final against Celtic, in which Celtic struck two late goals to win 4–2.

=== Aberdeen ===
McNeill was appointed Aberdeen manager in June 1977, having been recommended by Jock Stein. He succeeded Ally MacLeod. In his one season in charge, 1977–78, McNeill led Aberdeen to runners-up finishes in the league and Scottish Cup, and enjoyed a positive working relationship with the club's chairman, Dick Donald. Their performance in the league was their best since 1972, and three places above Celtic. During his season with Aberdeen, McNeill signed Gordon Strachan, Steve Archibald and Neil Simpson. When Stein retired as Celtic manager, he identified McNeill as his successor, and McNeill accepted the club's offer. He was succeeded at Aberdeen by Alex Ferguson.

=== Celtic ===
McNeill returned to a Celtic side who had finished in fifth place in 1977–78. He immediately improved the club's fortunes, as they won the league championship in 1978–79. Celtic clinched the title in their final match of the league season by beating Rangers 4–2, despite having had Johnny Doyle sent off.

His five years in charge saw Celtic win three League championships, in 1978–79, 1980–81 and 1981–82, the Scottish Cup in 1979–80 and the League Cup in 1982–83. This period saw Celtic's greatest competition come from the New Firm clubs – Aberdeen, who won the League championship in 1979–80, and Dundee United, who won the title in 1982–83.

McNeill is credited with developing young players for Celtic, such as Paul McStay and Charlie Nicholas, and making signings such as Murdo MacLeod and Davie Provan who became key players for the club through the 1980s. However, McNeill found working with Desmond White, Celtic's chairman, very difficult, and felt underpaid and underappreciated. Despite Celtic's successes, by 1983 he was being paid less than the managers of Aberdeen, Dundee United, Rangers and St Mirren. When White sold Nicholas to Arsenal, against McNeill's wishes, McNeill looked for the first available way out, and took up the offer to manage Manchester City.

=== Manchester City and Aston Villa ===
On 30 June 1983 he moved to England to manage Manchester City. Two years before being appointed by City, he had been strongly linked with the manager's job at their city rivals Manchester United, when Ron Atkinson was appointed instead. McNeill secured promotion for City after two seasons in charge (in 1984–85), and oversaw survival in their first season back in the First Division (1985–86). He started the 1986–87 season as manager of Manchester City but quit in September 1986.

That same season he took charge of Aston Villa. Despite the club's recent success, transfer resources were limited and McNeill's brief was to generate his own team-building resources through wheeling and dealing. When Villa were relegated, after finishing bottom of the First Division in May 1987, McNeill stood down and was replaced by Graham Taylor. Manchester City were also relegated that season.

=== Return to Celtic ===
He then returned to Celtic, and in his first season, 1987–88, the club won the League Championship and Scottish Cup double in their centenary year. Celtic were renowned for scoring late goals that season, and in both the Cup semi-final and final scored late goals to come from behind and win 2–1. Celtic won the Scottish Cup in 1988–89, defeating Rangers 1–0 in the final.

The following two seasons were disappointing, and Celtic did not win a trophy. They lost the 1990 Scottish Cup Final to Aberdeen on penalties. Celtic's league performance was particularly poor; after finishing in third place in 1988–89, they managed only fifth in 1989–90 and third in 1990–91. This was the beginning of a period of poor results and increasing financial instability for Celtic, which continued until the club was taken over by Fergus McCann in 1994. McNeill was sacked by Celtic on 22 May 1991 after four seasons as manager, at the age of 51. In two spells he won eight trophies as Celtic manager – four League championships, three Scottish Cups and one League Cup.

After leaving Celtic he turned down several offers to return to management, including from Dundee, and worked in the media instead. He remained bitter about the manner of his departure from Celtic, until he was asked to become a club ambassador in 2009.

=== Hibernian ===
McNeill had a brief spell as football development manager (Note: McNeill's position at Hibernian has been described in different sources as "football development manager", "football development officer" and "director of development".) at Hibernian in the later part of the 1997–98 season. He was brought in as a mentor to manager Jim Duffy, as they unsuccessfully attempted to arrest a decline in fortunes at the club. McNeill took charge of the team for one game after Duffy was sacked, even though he had been out of football since leaving Celtic in 1991 and was recovering from heart surgery. He left Hibernian at the end of the 1997–98 season.

== Books ==
McNeill wrote three autobiographies:

- McNeill, Billy (1966). For Celtic and Scotland. The Sportmans Book Club.
- McNeill, Billy; Cameron, Alex (1988). Back to Paradise. Mainstream. ISBN 978-1851581887.
- McNeill, Billy (2004). Hail Cesar. Headline. ISBN 978-0755313167.

== Awards and recognition ==
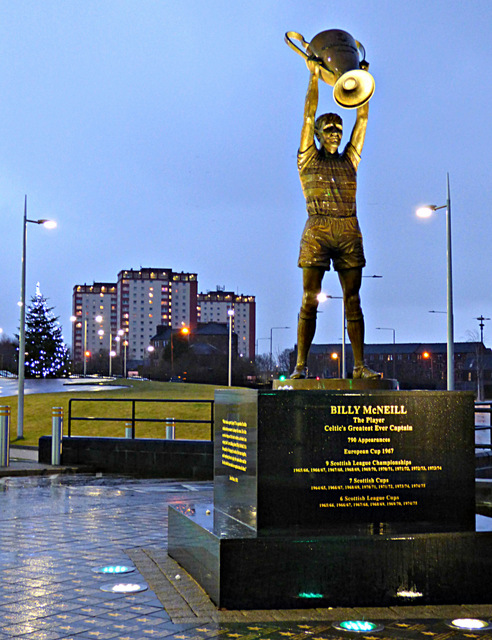
John McKenna's statue of McNeill outside Celtic Park

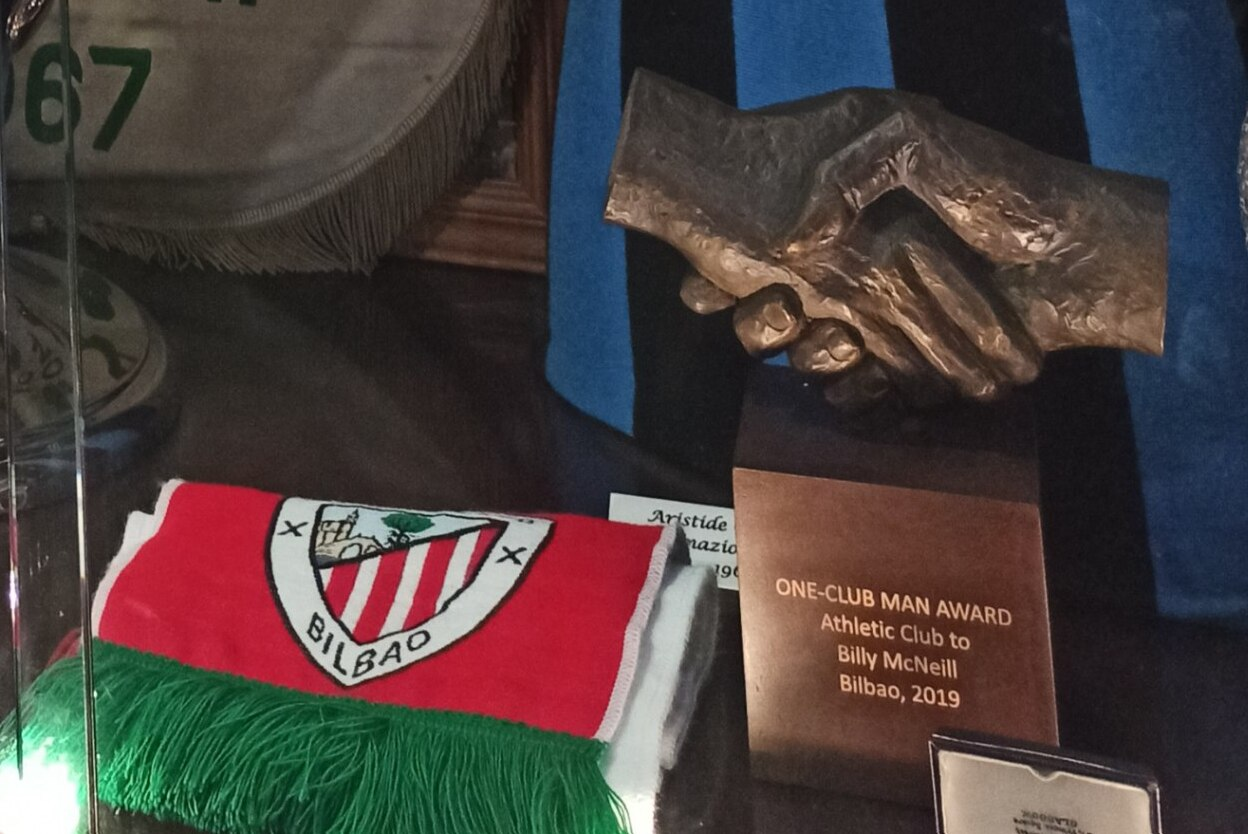
McNeill's One Club Award on display at Celtic Park

McNeill was awarded the MBE in November 1974. In 2002 he was voted Celtic's greatest ever captain, and a member of Celtic's greatest team, by the club's fans. He was inducted into the Scottish Sports Hall of Fame in 2002 and the Scottish Football Hall of Fame in 2004.

In December 2015 Celtic installed a statue at the entrance to the Celtic Way outside Celtic Park, created by sculptor John McKenna. The statue, in bronze on a granite base, shows McNeill holding aloft the European Cup, an iconic image in the club's history.

In 2019, he was recognised with the "One Club Award" by Spanish club Athletic Bilbao for his achievements and loyalty to Celtic.

A short time after his death, the new sports pitch at his former school, Our Lady's High, was named in his honour.

In 2019, the Billy McNeill Commemoration Committee was created in Bellshill, and campaigned to raise funds to build a bronze sculpture of McNeill at the pedestrian area of Bellshill Cross. The statue was unveiled in November 2022.

== Personal life ==
McNeill's maternal grandparents were from Lithuania, while his father was of Irish descent. He was Catholic.

McNeill married Liz Callaghan, a dancer on the TV variety show The White Heather Club in 1963. They had five children.

McNeill, along with former Rangers player Eric Caldow, stood as a candidate for the Scottish Senior Citizens Unity Party in the 2003 Scottish Parliament election. In 2008, he was awarded an honorary degree from the University of Glasgow.

During the 2014 Scottish independence referendum McNeill was a supporter of the Better Together campaign against Scottish independence.

It was reported in February 2017 that McNeill was suffering from dementia and was very limited in his speech. He died on 22 April 2019, aged 79.

== Career statistics ==
=== Club ===
Appearances and goals by club, season and competition
Club	Season	League			Scottish Cup		Scottish League Cup		Europe		Other		Total	
Club	Season	Division	Apps	Goals	Apps	Goals	Apps	Goals	Apps	Goals	Apps	Goals	Apps	Goals
Celtic	1957–58	Division One	0	0	0	0	0	0	0	0	–		0	0
Celtic	1958–59	Division One	17	0	0	0	6	0	0	0	–		23	0
Celtic	1959–60	Division One	19	0	7	0	6	0	0	0	–		32	0
Celtic	1960–61	Division One	31	1	8	0	4	0	0	0	–		43	1
Celtic	1961–62	Division One	29	1	6	0	6	0	0	0	–		41	1
Celtic	1962–63	Division One	28	1	7	0	6	0	1	0	–		42	1
Celtic	1963–64	Division One	28	0	4	0	6	0	8	0	–		46	0
Celtic	1964–65	Division One	22	0	6	1	6	0	2	0	–		36	1
Celtic	1965–66	Division One	25	0	7	0	10	0	7	1	–		49	1
Celtic	1966–67	Division One	33	0	6	0	10	2	9	1	–		58	3
Celtic	1967–68	Division One	34	5	1	0	10	0	2	0	3 (Note: Appearances in the World Club Championship)	1	50	6
Celtic	1968–69	Division One	34	3	7	3	9	0	6	0	–		56	6
Celtic	1969–70	Division One	31	5	5	0	10	2	9	0	–		55	7
Celtic	1970–71	Division One	31	1	8	1	10	0	5	1	–		54	3
Celtic	1971–72	Division One	34	3	6	1	8	0	7	0	–		55	4
Celtic	1972–73	Division One	30	1	7	1	10	0	4	0	–		51	2
Celtic	1973–74	Division One	30	0	5	0	11	0	7	0	–		53	0
Celtic	1974–75	Division One	30	1	4	0	9	0	2	0	–		45	1
Career total			486	22	94	7	137	4	69	3	3	1	789	37

NB These totals do not include appearances in the Glasgow Cup, which at the time was a senior trophy.

=== International ===
Appearances and goals by national team and year
National team	Year	Apps	Goals
Scotland	1961	6	0
Scotland	1962	2	0
Scotland	1963	3	0
Scotland	1964	2	0
Scotland	1965	6	1
Scotland	1967	1	0
Scotland	1968	2	0
Scotland	1969	4	2
Scotland	1972	3	0
Total		29	3

Scores and results list Scotland's goal tally first, score column indicates score after each McNeill goal.

List of international goals scored by Billy McNeill
No.	Date	Venue	Opponent	Score	Result	Competition
1	13 October 1965	Hampden Park, Glasgow, Scotland	Poland	1–0	1–2	1966 FIFA World Cup qualification
2	3 May 1969	Racecourse Ground, Wrexham, Wales	Wales	1–0	5–3	1968–69 British Home Championship
3	17 May 1969	Hampden Park, Glasgow, Scotland	Cyprus	2–0	8–0	1970 FIFA World Cup qualification

== Managerial statistics ==
Team	Nat	From	To	Record				
Team	Nat	From	To	G	W	D	L	Win %
Clyde	(Scotland)	April 1977	June 1977	8	4	3	1	50.00
Aberdeen	(Scotland)	June 1977	August 1978	50	31	11	8	62.00
Celtic	(Scotland)	August 1978	May 1983	258	165	40	53	63.95
Manchester City	(England)	June 1983	September 1986	150	60	41	49	40.00
Aston Villa	(England)	September 1986	May 1987	41	9	15	17	21.95
Celtic	(Scotland)	May 1987	May 1991	197	108	41	48	54.82
Total				654	346	140	168	52.91

== Honours ==
=== Player ===
Celtic

- Scottish Division One: 1965–66, 1966–67, 1967–68, 1968–69, 1969–70, 1970–71, 1971–72, 1972–73, 1973–74
- Scottish Cup: 1964–65, 1966–67, 1968–69, 1970–71, 1971–72, 1973–74, 1974–75
- Scottish League Cup: 1965–66, 1966–67, 1967–68, 1968–69, 1969–70, 1974–75
- Drybrough Cup: 1974–75
- Glasgow Cup: 1961–62, 1963–64, 1964–65, 1966–67, 1967–68
- European Cup: 1966–67

Scotland

- British Home Championship: 1961–62, 1963–64 (shared), 1971–72

=== Manager ===
Celtic

- Scottish Premier Division: 1978–79, 1980–81, 1981–82, 1987–88
- Scottish Cup: 1979–80, 1987–88, 1988–89
- Scottish League Cup: 1982–83
- Glasgow Cup: 1981–82

Aberdeen

- Scottish Cup runner-up: 1977–78

Manchester City

- Football League Second Division: Promotion 1984–85
- Full Members' Cup: runner-up 1985–86

=== Individual ===
- SFWA Footballer of the Year: 1964–65
- Scottish Football Personality of the Year: 1977–78
- SFWA Manager of the Year: 1987–88
- Glasgow Sportman of the Millenium: 1999
- Scottish Football Hall of Fame: 2004
  - 2017 (as part of the Lisbon Lions)
- Scottish Sports Hall of Fame: 2002
- One Club Award: 2019

== See also ==
- List of one-club men in association football
- List of Scotland national football team captains

Sporting positions
Preceded by Duncan MacKay	Celtic captain 1962–1975	Succeeded by Kenny Dalglish
