= Bertie Auld =

Scottish footballer and manager (1938–2021)

- Auld in his debut game for Scotland, 1959

Personal information
- Full name: Robert Auld
- Date of birth: 23 March 1938
- Place of birth: Glasgow, Scotland
- Date of death: 14 November 2021 (aged 83)
- Positions: Outside left; midfielder

Youth career
- Maryhill Harp

Senior career*
Years	Team	Apps	(Gls)
1955–1961	Celtic	74	(17)
1956–1957	→ Dumbarton (loan)	15	(8)
1961–1965	Birmingham City	126	(26)
1965–1971	Celtic	102	(36)
1971–1973	Hibernian	11	(3)
Total		328	(90)

International career
1958–1965	Scottish League XI	2	(0)
1959	Scotland	3	(0)

Managerial career
- 1974–1980: Partick Thistle
- 1980–1982: Hibernian
- 1982–1983: Hamilton Academical
- 1986: Partick Thistle
- 1988: Dumbarton
- * Club domestic league appearances and goals

Robert Auld (23 March 1938 – 14 November 2021) was a Scottish football player and manager. He was a member of Celtic's Lisbon Lions, who won the 1967 European Cup Final.

As a player, he made more than 200 appearances in the Scottish League for Celtic, Dumbarton and Hibernian, and more than 100 in the Football League in England with Birmingham City. He also earned three caps for Scotland early in his career.

He spent six years as manager at Partick Thistle, and was appointed to the club's hall of fame. He also managed Hibernian, Hamilton Academical and Dumbarton.

== Early life and club career ==
Auld was born in Maryhill, Glasgow, the eldest of eight children, and at the age of 15 joined local club Maryhill Harp. Rejecting offers from Clyde and Partick Thistle, he first joined Celtic in March 1955, making his debut in a League Cup game against Airdrieonians and scoring his first goal for the club in a 6–1 win over East Fife in the same competition four days later. He was converted from a fullback into a winger, but his headstrong character and poor discipline impeded his progress and after spending a season on loan to Dumbarton, he was sold to Birmingham City in 1961 for £15,000, making his debut against Internazionale in the semi-final of the 1960–61 Inter-Cities Fairs Cup. He appeared in the final of the competition, in which Birmingham were beaten 4–2 on aggregate by A.S. Roma. With the Midlands club he won a League Cup medal in 1963, as Birmingham beat city rivals Aston Villa 3-1 on aggregate.

In 1965 Auld returned to Celtic in a £12,000 deal, possibly on the initiative of Jock Stein, who had not yet been appointed Celtic manager. No longer considered a winger, Auld formed a midfield partnership with Bobby Murdoch. He became an integral part of the side that won nine League titles, as well as the 1967 European Cup Final. Prior to that match, against Italian club Internazionale, Auld instigated a rendition of "The Celtic Song" in the tunnel, much to the bemusement of the Inter players.

Auld left Celtic again in 1971, this time joining Hibernian on a free transfer. While at Easter Road he combined his playing role with one as a trainer, eventually focusing solely on the latter role.

== International career ==
Auld made three appearances for Scotland, all in 1959. He made his debut against the Netherlands, a game in which he became the first player ever to be sent off for Scotland, after lashing out in retaliation at an opponent.

== Managerial career ==
Auld started a career as a manager in 1974, when appointed by Partick Thistle, where he stayed for six seasons. After Thistle won the Scottish First Division title in 1975–76. Thistle also reached the semi-finals of Scottish Cup twice (1978 and 1979), Scottish League Cup (1975), and Anglo-Scottish Cup (1977) under Auld's management.

He returned to Edinburgh as Hibs manager in 1980, in an attempt to revive the club following their relegation in the 1979–80 season. Auld guided Hibs to promotion by winning the 1980–81 Scottish First Division, but was replaced by Pat Stanton in 1982. He then spent a year in charge of Hamilton Academical before returning to manage Thistle for a brief second spell in 1986. His final appointment was with Dumbarton in 1988.

== Style of play ==
A pacey winger with short stature in his first years at Celtic and at Birmingham City, Auld was converted into a midfielder under Celtic manager Jock Stein. In similar vein as his midfield partner Bobby Murdoch, Auld was capable of defence splitting passes.

== Personal life ==
From 1963 until his death, Auld was married to Liz, with whom he had two children. Following the end of his football career, he ran a pub named The Buccaneer in Hamilton. In the early 21st century Auld was a regular guest on Celtic TV. During the 2014 Scottish independence referendum, Auld stated his support for the Better Together campaign against Scottish independence. Auld died on 14 November 2021, aged 83.

== Honours ==
In November 2009 Auld was inducted into the Scottish Football Hall of Fame.

=== Player ===
Celtic

- Scottish First Division: 1965–66, 1966–67, 1967–68, 1968–69, 1969–70
- Scottish Cup: 1964–65, 1966–67, 1968–69
- Scottish League Cup: 1966–67, 1967–68, 1968–69, 1969–70
- Glasgow Cup: 1964–65, 1966–67
- European Cup: 1966–67; runner-up 1969–70
- Intercontinental Cup runner-up: 1967

Birmingham City

- Football League Cup: 1962–63
- Inter-Cities Fairs Cup: runners-up 1960–61

Scotland

- British Home Championship: 1959–60 (shared)

=== Manager ===
Partick Thistle

- Scottish First Division: 1975–76

Hibernian

- Scottish First Division: 1980–81
- East of Scotland Shield: 1980–81
