= Lisbon Lions =

Celtic Football Club 1967 team

We did it by playing football. Pure, beautiful, inventive football.

— Jock Stein on Celtic's triumph in Lisbon

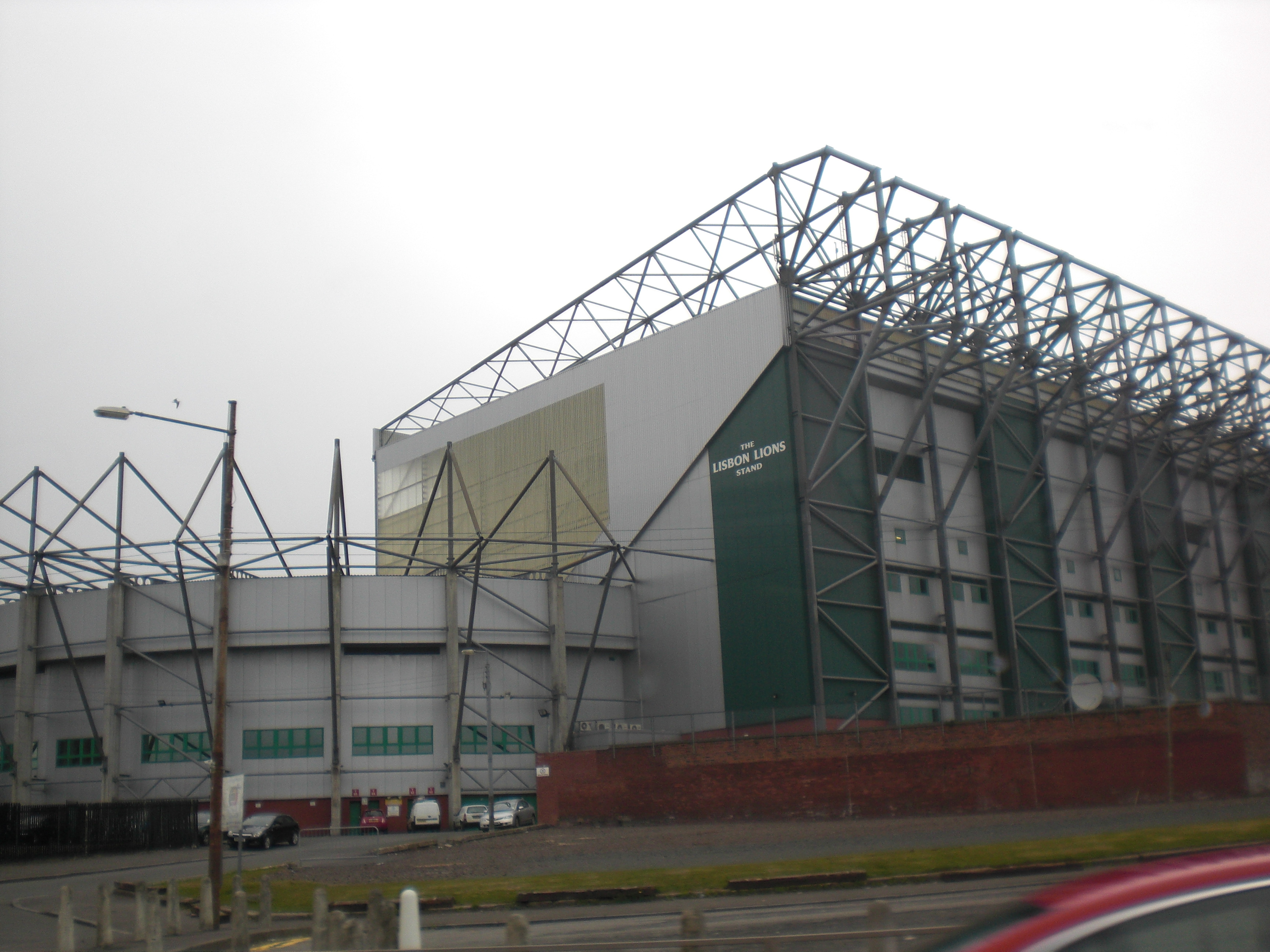
The east stand at Celtic Park is named in honour of the team.

The Lisbon Lions is the nickname given to the Celtic team that won the European Cup at the Estádio Nacional in Lisbon, Portugal on 25 May 1967, defeating Inter Milan 2–1.

== Name ==
The name is likely due to the fact that the Lisbon-based club Sporting's mascot is a lion and both clubs wear green and white horizontal stripes.

== Event ==
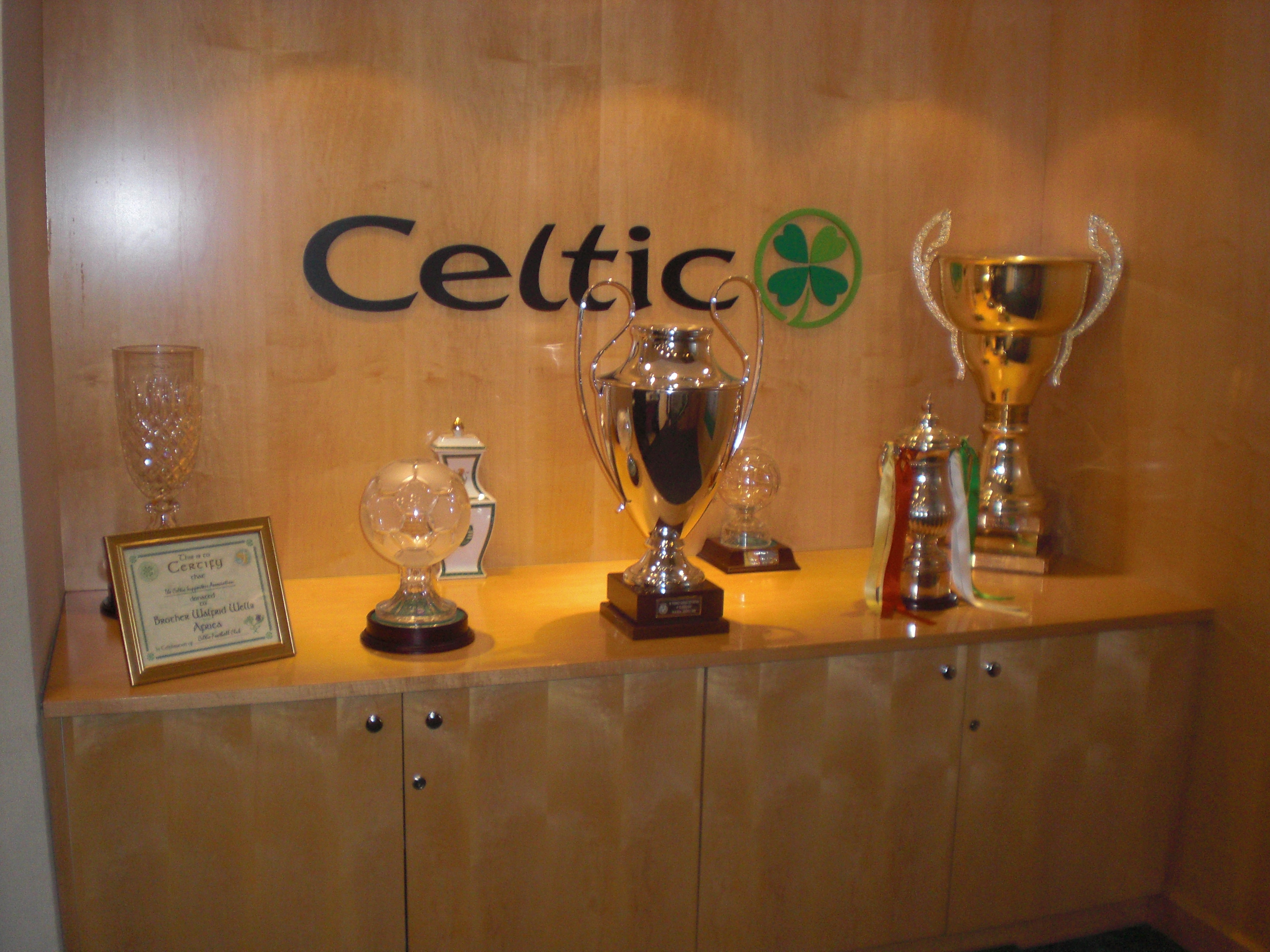
A display of some of Celtic's trophies, including a replica of the European Cup featuring prominently

All but two members of the 15 man squad were born within 10 miles of Celtic Park in Glasgow, Scotland (Bobby Lennox, who was born 30 miles away in Saltcoats, and Tommy Gemmell, who was born in Motherwell 11 miles away). Celtic's style was the antithesis of the cynical – but highly effective – defensive style of Inter. Jimmy Johnstone described the team's style as "like the Dutch speeded-up".

In the stadium where his father Valentino played his last match, Sandro Mazzola opened the scoring for Inter with a 7th-minute penalty after Jim Craig had brought down Renato Cappellini. The Italians then retreated into their famous 11-man defence. Inter did not win a single corner and forced Celtic goalkeeper Ronnie Simpson to make only two saves. Celtic had two shots off the crossbar, and 39 other attempts on goal, 13 of which were saved by Italian goalkeeper Giuliano Sarti, seven were blocked or deflected, and 19 were off-target. Craig made amends for his penalty mistake on 63 minutes, when he laid off the ball for Tommy Gemmell to fire home for the Celtic equaliser. With 83 minutes on the clock, Gemmell was allowed space, and he played the ball to Bobby Murdoch, whose long-range shot was deflected by Stevie Chalmers past Sarti into the net.

Celtic were the first British club to win the European Cup, and still the only Scottish club to have reached the final. Having already triumphed in the Scottish top flight, Scottish Cup, and Scottish League Cup, the Lisbon Lions became the first winners of the European Treble and remain the only winners of the fabled Quadruple. Celtic are also one of just three European clubs to have won five trophies in a single season, thanks to their Glasgow Cup triumph over Partick Thistle. They reached the European Cup final again in 1970 but were beaten 2–1 by Feyenoord after extra time in the San Siro Stadium in Milan.

== Celtic's results in the 1966–67 European Cup ==
1966–67 European Cup
| Date | Venue | Opponents | Score | Round | Celtic scorers |
|---|---|---|---|---|---|
| 28 September 1966 | Celtic Park, Glasgow (H) | FC Zürich | 2–0 | First round, 1st leg | Gemmell, McBride |
| 5 October 1966 | Letzigrund, Zürich (A) | FC Zürich | 3–0 | First round, 2nd leg | Gemmell (2, 1 pen.), Chalmers |
| 30 November 1966 | Stade Marcel Saupin, Nantes (A) | FC Nantes | 3–1 | Second round, 1st leg | McBride, Lennox, Chalmers |
| 7 December 1966 | Celtic Park, Glasgow (H) | FC Nantes | 3–1 | Second round, 2nd leg | Johnstone, Chalmers, Lennox |
| 1 March 1967 | Karađorđe Stadium, Novi Sad (A) | FK Vojvodina | 0–1 | Quarter-final, 1st leg | n/a |
| 8 March 1967 | Celtic Park, Glasgow (H) | FK Vojvodina | 2–0 | Quarter-final, 2nd leg | Chalmers, McNeill |
| 12 April 1967 | Celtic Park, Glasgow (H) | Dukla Prague | 3–1 | Semi-final, 1st leg | Johnstone, Wallace (2) |
| 25 April 1967 | Stadion Juliska, Prague (A) | Dukla Prague | 0–0 | Semi-final, 2nd leg | n/a |
| 25 May 1967 | Estádio Nacional, Lisbon (N) | Inter Milan | 2–1 | Final | Gemmell, Chalmers |

== Celtic team in the final ==
1. Ronnie Simpson
2. Jim Craig
3. Tommy Gemmell
4. Bobby Murdoch
5. Billy McNeill (captain)
6. John Clark
7. Jimmy Johnstone
8. Willie Wallace
9. Stevie Chalmers
10. Bertie Auld
11. Bobby Lennox
12. John Fallon (substitute goalkeeper, not used)
- Jock Stein (Manager)
- Sean Fallon (Assistant Manager)
- Neil Mochan (Trainer)

Notes: Celtic did not wear numbers on their shirts at this time. The numbers shown were sewn onto their shorts.

A second goalkeeper was the only substitute allowed at the time. The other members of the squad who played in Europe during that season were Charlie Gallagher, John Hughes, Joe McBride and Willie O'Neill.

== Awards ==
- BBC Sports Team of the Year:

1967

- SPFA Special Merit Award:

1992 (awarded to Lisbon Lions)

- Scottish Football Hall of Fame:

2017 (Lisbon Lions inducted)

- The Loving Cup (Lord Provost's Awards):

2017 (the 50th anniversary)
