= Alfredo Di Stéfano (disambiguation) =

Alfredo Di Stéfano (1926–2014) was a professional footballer and manager.

Alfredo Di Stéfano may also refer to:

- Alfredo di Stéfano Stadium, the home ground of Real Madrid Castilla
- Alfredo Di Stéfano Trophy (testimonial match), a testimonial match for Alfredo Di Stéfano in 1967
- Trofeo Alfredo Di Stéfano, a trophy awarded by Spanish sports newspaper Marca to the best footballer of La Liga
