= Ronnie Simpson =

Scottish footballer (1930–2004)

Personal information
- Full name: Ronald Campbell Simpson
- Date of birth: 11 October 1930
- Place of birth: Glasgow, Scotland
- Date of death: 19 April 2004 (aged 73)
- Place of death: Edinburgh, Scotland
- Height: 5 ft 10 in (1.78 m)
- Position: Goalkeeper

Senior career*
Years	Team	Apps	(Gls)
1946–1950	Queen's Park	78	(0)
1950–1951	Third Lanark	21	(0)
1951–1960	Newcastle United	262	(0)
1960–1964	Hibernian	123	(0)
1964–1970	Celtic	118	(0)
Total		602	(0)

International career
1948	Great Britain		
1953–1957	Scotland B	2	(0)
1967–1968	Scotland	5	(0)
1968	Scottish Football League XI	1	(0)

Managerial career
- 1971–1972: Hamilton Academical
- * Club domestic league appearances and goals

Ronald Campbell Simpson (11 October 1930 – 19 April 2004) was a Scottish football player and coach. He is mainly remembered for his time with Celtic, where he was the goalkeeper in the Lisbon Lions team that won the European Cup in 1967. Earlier in his career, Simpson had won the FA Cup twice with Newcastle United. He also played for Queen's Park, Third Lanark and Hibernian. Simpson represented Great Britain in the 1948 Olympics, but was not selected for Scotland until 1967. He made his international debut in the famous 3–2 victory against England at Wembley.

== Club career ==
Simpson started his senior career with amateur club Queen's Park; he was selected by their first team in 1945, aged just 14 years and 304 days. This made him the youngest person to represent a Scottish league club, although it was an unofficial record due to the suspension of normal competitive football during the Second World War. He was 15 when he made his first Scottish Football League appearance in August 1946.

After completing his National Service, Simpson moved to Third Lanark in 1950. He then joined Newcastle United six months later for a fee of £8,750. He won the FA Cup twice with Newcastle, after taking over as their regular goalkeeper from Jack Fairbrother, in 1952 and 1955.

After nine years and almost 300 appearances for Newcastle, Simpson returned to Scotland, with Hibernian, in 1960. His performances helped to save Hibs from relegation in 1962, but he fell out of favour under the management of Jock Stein due to his attitude in training. Hibernian sold Simpson to Celtic in 1964 for £4,000.

Thought to be in the last throes of his career, Celtic signed Simpson as cover for John Fallon. This perception appeared to be confirmed when Jock Stein, who had let Simpson go as Hibernian manager, was appointed Celtic manager later in the 1964–65 season; however, Simpson became the first choice after Fallon was blamed for a defeat by Rangers in the 1964 Scottish League Cup Final. His sense of humour made Simpson a popular figure in the team, who nicknamed him "Faither", on account of his relative old age.

The highlight of his time at Celtic was winning the 1967 European Cup Final, as part of a clean sweep of trophies in the 1966–67 season. Apart from an early save with his knees from a Sandro Mazzola header, Simpson had little to do during the match. His fancy footwork when dealing with a backpass was one of the highlights. Because Fallon did not factor into that season's Scottish Cup or Scottish League Cup, Simpson stood alone as the first goalkeeper to win the European Treble and remains the only goalkeeper to win the fabled Quadruple.

He suffered a dislocated shoulder in 1969, and trouble with this injury forced him to miss the 1970 European Cup Final and to retire as a player that year.

== International career ==
Simpson represented the Scotland Youth side in a match against England Youth played on 25 October 1947 at Belle Vue, Doncaster. He was selected by Matt Busby to play for the Great Britain squad in the 1948 Olympics. Great Britain finished fourth, losing a bronze medal playoff to Denmark.

Simpson also played for the Scotland national team, making his debut in the famous 3–2 win over 1966 World Cup winners England at Wembley in 1967. He set a new record for being the oldest player to make his Scotland debut, aged 36 years and 196 days. He won five full caps in total, alongside the Youth and B international caps won earlier in his career. He also represented the Scottish League once, in 1968.

== Style of play ==
Simpson was small in stature for a goalkeeper, at just 5 feet 10 inches. He compensated for this with an unorthodox style of shot-stopping, using his elbows and shoulders to block shots. He also had top-class foot movement and ball distribution skills.

== Personal and later life ==
Simpson's father Jimmy Simpson also played for Scotland, and enjoyed notable success as a centre-half for Rangers and Dundee United in the 1930s.

After Ronnie Simpson retired as a player, he was manager of Hamilton Academical for a year. He also served on the Pools Panel, which adjudicated on results of postponed matches in periods of exceptionally bad weather. He was also a Progressives Councillor on Edinburgh City Council in the 1970s. Simpson died from a heart attack on 19 April 2004.

== Awards ==
In 2002, Simpson was named in Celtic's greatest ever team, ahead of John Thomson and Pat Bonner.

He was posthumously inducted into the Scottish Football Hall of Fame in November 2011.

== Honours ==
Newcastle United

- FA Cup: 1951–52, 1954–55

Celtic

- Scottish League: 1965–66, 1966–67, 1967–68, 1968–69
- Scottish Cup: 1966–67; runner-up: 1965–66
- Scottish League Cup: 1965–66, 1966–67, 1967–68
- Glasgow Cup: 1966–67, 1967–68
- European Cup: 1966–67

Individual

- SFWA Footballer of the Year: 1967
