= Scottish Football Hall of Fame =

Scottish football award

Coordinates: 55°49′32″N 4°15′4″W

The Scottish Football Hall of Fame is located at the Scottish Football Museum in Glasgow, Scotland. Nominations are made each year by fans and a committee selects the inductees. The first inductions to the Hall of Fame were in November 2004 in a ceremony at Hampden Park. Brian Laudrup and Henrik Larsson became the first players from outside Scotland to be inducted, in 2006. Rose Reilly was the first woman to be inducted into the Hall of Fame, in 2007. As of October 2019, there had been 122 inductions to the Hall of Fame.

== Members ==
Year	Image	Name	Notes	Ref
2004	Statue of Jim Baxter	Jim Baxter	(statue in Hill of Beath pictured)	
2004	Billy Bremner	Billy Bremner		
2004	Matt Busby	Matt Busby		
2004	Kenny Dalglish in 2009	Kenny Dalglish		
2004	Alex Ferguson in 2006	Alex Ferguson		
2004	–	Hughie Gallacher		
2004	Statue of John Greig	John Greig	(statue at Ibrox Stadium pictured)	
2004	Jimmy Johnstone in 1971	Jimmy Johnstone		
2004	Denis Law in 2011	Denis Law		
2004	Dave Mackay in 2006	Dave Mackay		
2004	Danny Grain in 2013	Danny McGrain		
2004	Jimmy McGrory	Jimmy McGrory		
2004	Billy McNeill in 1982	Billy McNeill		
2004	–	Willie Miller		
2004	–	Bobby Murdoch		
2004	Statue of Shankley at Anfield	Bill Shankly	(statue at Anfield pictured)	
2004	–	Gordon Smith		
2004	Souness in 2001	Graeme Souness		
2004	Jock Stein in 1971	Jock Stein		
2004	–	Willie Woodburn		
2005	Charles Campbell	Charles Campbell		
2005	Alex James	Alex James		
2005	Joe Jordan in 2009	Joe Jordan		
2005	Bobby Lennox in 1971	Bobby Lennox		
2005	–	Jim McLean		
2005	Alex McLeish in 2012	Alex McLeish		
2005	Alan Morton	Alan Morton		
2005	–	Lawrie Reilly		
2005	–	Willie Waddell		
2005	John White in 1961	John White		
2005	–	George Young		
2006	Statue of Davie Cooper in Hamilton	Davie Cooper	(statue in Hamilton pictured)	
2006	Tommy Gemmell in 1971	Tommy Gemmell		
2006	–	Richard Gough		
2006	–	Willie Henderson		
2006	–	Sandy Jardine		
2006	Henrik Larsson in 2014	Henrik Larsson		
2006	Brian Laudrup in 2013	Brian Laudrup		
2006	–	Willie Ormond		
2006	John Robertson in 1980	John Robertson		
2006	–	Billy Steel		
2006	Tommy Walker in 1947	Tommy Walker		
2007	–	Willie Bauld		
2007	–	Eric Caldow		
2007	–	Jimmy Cowan		
2007	Alan Hansen in 2004	Alan Hansen		
2007	Ally McCoist in 1994	Ally McCoist		
2007	Rose Reilly in 1975	Rose Reilly		
2007	–	Walter Smith		
2007	Gordon Strachan in 2007	Gordon Strachan		
2007	–	Eddie Turnbull		
2008	–	Bobby Evans		
2008	–	Archie Gemmill		
2008	Derek Johnstone in 1978	Derek Johnstone		
2008	Jim Leighton in 2009	Jim Leighton		
2008	Billy Liddell in 1939	Billy Liddell		
2008	Ian St John in 1966	Ian St John		
2008		Bill Struth		
2008	John Thomson	John Thomson		
2009	–	Steve Archibald		
2009	–	Bertie Auld		
2009	–	Jimmy Delaney		
2009	–	Alan Gilzean		
2009	–	Mo Johnston		
2009	Paul Lambert in 2011	Paul Lambert		
2009	–	Willie Maley		
2009	–	David Meiklejohn		
2010	–	Craig Brown		
2010	–	Andy Goram		
2010	–	Bobby Johnstone		
2010	–	Paul McStay		
2010	–	David Narey		
2010	–	Tiny Wharton		
2011	Terry Butcher in 2011	Terry Butcher		
2011	Paddy Crerand in 2011	Paddy Crerand		
2011	Robert Smyth McColl in c. 1901	Robert Smyth McColl		
2011	–	Hugh McIlvanney		
2011	–	Ronnie Simpson		
2012	–	Pat Stanton		
2012	–	Bob McPhail		
2012	–	Gordon McQueen		
2012	Frank McLintock in 2009	Frank McLintock		
2012	Andrew Watson	Andrew Watson		
2013	–	Bobby Walker		
2013	–	Eddie Gray		
2013	–	Alan Rough		
2013	–	Scot Symon		
2013	–	Martin Buchan		
2013	Tommy Docherty in 2017	Tommy Docherty		
2014	–	Bill Brown		
2014	–	Peter Lorimer		
2014	–	McCrae's Battalion	Footballers who volunteered for military service in the First World War	
2014	–	Davie Wilson		
2014	–	Charlie Nicholas		
2015	–	Bobby Brown		
2015	George Graham in 1970	George Graham		
2015	–	Stewart Hillis		
2015	–	Ally MacLeod		
2015	–	Maurice Malpas		
2016	–	Stevie Chalmers		
2016	John Wark in 2006	John Wark		
2016	Gary McAllister in 2010	Gary McAllister		
2016		Jock Wallace Jr.		
2016	–	Alex Smith		
2017	–	John Clark		
2017	Willie Wallace in 1971	Willie Wallace		
2017	–	Jim Craig		
2017	John McGovern in 2007	John McGovern		
2017	–	Allan McGraw		
2017	–	Archie Macpherson		
2017	–	Queen's Park		
2017	–	Lisbon Lions	Celtic team that won the 1966–67 European Cup	
2018	Roy Aitken	Roy Aitken		
2018	Julie Fleeting	Julie Fleeting		
2018	–	Archie Knox		
2018	–	Ian McMillan		
2019	–	Patsy Gallacher		
2019	–	Joe Harper		
2019	–	Tommy McLean		
2019	–	John Robertson		
2019	Colin Stein	Colin Stein		
2019	–	Paul Sturrock		

== See also ==
- Scottish FA International Roll of Honour, a list of all Scotland players with more than 50 caps
