= Tommy Gemmell =

Scottish footballer and manager

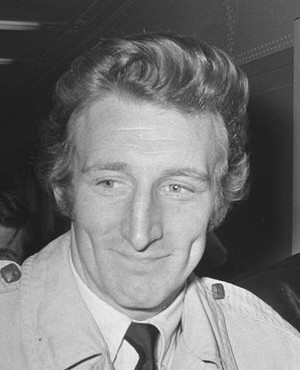
- Gemmell (1971)

Personal information
- Date of birth: 16 October 1943
- Place of birth: Craigneuk, Scotland
- Date of death: 2 March 2017 (aged 73)
- Height: 1.88 m (6 ft 2 in)
- Position: Left back

Youth career
- 1959–1961: Coltness United

Senior career*
Years	Team	Apps	(Gls)
1961–1971	Celtic	247	(37)
1971–1973	Nottingham Forest	39	(6)
1973	Miami Toros	0	(0)
1973–1977	Dundee	94	(8)
Total		380	(51)

International career
1966–1971	Scotland	18	(1)
1965–1968	Scottish Football League XI	5	(0)

Managerial career
- 1977–1980: Dundee
- 1986–1987: Albion Rovers
- 1993–1994: Albion Rovers
- * Club domestic league appearances and goals

Thomas Gemmell (16 October 1943 – 2 March 2017) was a Scottish football player and manager. Although right-footed, he excelled as a left-sided fullback and had powerful shooting ability. Gemmell is best known as one of the Celtic side who won the 1966–67 European Cup; he scored the first Celtic goal in the final. Gemmell played 18 times for Scotland, and also played for Nottingham Forest, Miami Toros and Dundee. After retiring as a player in 1977, Gemmell managed Dundee and Albion Rovers.

== Playing career ==
=== Celtic ===
In October 1961, Gemmell joined Celtic from Coltness United; he signed youth terms on the same day as right winger Jimmy Johnstone, who lived a few miles away and would also have a long association with the club. He was one of the 'Lisbon Lions' who won the 1967 European Cup final against Inter Milan, a final in which Gemmell scored an equalising goal with a shot from outside the penalty area. Ironically, Gemmell should not have been in position to score the goal, as he had ignored team orders for one full-back to stay in defence at all times; the right back Jim Craig had already ventured forward, and it was he who played the square ball for Gemmell to shoot, with both advancing on the Inter box. With this triumph, Celtic also sealed the first European Treble and the only Quadruple to date. Gemmell was one of just two Lisbon Lions to appear in all 59 matches in major competitions, the other being John Clark. Gemmell also scored in the 1970 European Cup final in a defeat to Feyenoord, making him currently one of only three British footballers to score in two different European Cup finals, the others being Phil Neal of Liverpool and Gareth Bale of Real Madrid.

Gemmell made 418 appearances for Celtic and scored 63 goals. This total comprised 247 league (37 goals), 43 cup (5 goals), 74 league cup (10 goals) and 54 European (12 goals) appearances. His record for penalties was 34 goals from 37 attempts. He placed sixth for the Ballon d'Or in 1967 and 24th in 1968.

In his book, Lion Heart, Gemmell revealed that, during his time at Celtic, he was on the receiving end of sectarian abuse from certain teammates; he and teammate Ian Young had been the target of "a handful" of colleagues who had wanted an all-Catholic team. He also stated that he received verbal abuse on several occasions from some supporters of Old Firm rivals Rangers due to his perceived status as a 'turncoat' (as a Protestant who played for Celtic), such as when attending matches many years after retiring.

=== Later career ===
In December 1971, Gemmell transferred to Nottingham Forest to cover for Liam O'Kane. At the end of that season Forest were relegated from the top flight.

In 1973 he had a short stint with the Miami Toros in the North American Soccer League. He returned to Scotland, signing for Dundee in July 1973, and won the 1973 Scottish League Cup final against former team Celtic. He retired from playing in 1977.

=== International ===
Gemmell made his international debut for Scotland against England at Hampden on 2 April 1966. The following year on 15 April, he played in the famous Home Championship match where Scotland recorded a 3–2 victory over World Champions England at Wembley Stadium, ending that team's run of nineteen games without defeat. He won 18 caps and scored one goal from the penalty spot against Cyprus in an 8–0 win in a 1970 World Cup qualifier. Gemmell's final appearance for Scotland came in 1971.

== Style of play ==
At his peak, Gemmell was considered one of the finest left backs in the world. Although right footed, Celtic manager Jock Stein placed him as a left-back. Gemmell was known for his overlaps and powerful shot, and was also a fine tackler, as well as penalty taker.

== Coaching career ==
After retiring as a player, Gemmell stayed to manage Dundee from 1 June 1977 to 15 April 1980. He signed Jimmy Johnstone, his former teammate at Celtic, for Dundee.

Gemmell later managed Albion Rovers from 1986 to 1987 and again from 1993 to 1994.

== Later life and death ==
In 1994, Gemmell sold his collection of Celtic medals at auction for £32,000; they were purchased by Glasgow businessman Willie Haughey, who has close ties with the club and loaned them back to Celtic to be put on display. He was inducted to the Scottish Football Hall of Fame in 2006.

Gemmell died on 2 March 2017, aged 73, after a long illness. His funeral was held on 10 March with a procession starting from Celtic Park, and was attended by former teammates, serving Celtic manager Brendan Rodgers and Rangers managing director Stewart Robertson.

== Honours ==
- European Cup: 1966–67
- Scottish League champions (6): 1965–66, 1966–67, 1967–68, 1968–69, 1969–70, 1970–71
- Scottish Cup (4): 1964–65, 1966–67, 1968–69, 1970–71
- Scottish League Cup (5): 1965–66, 1966–67, 1967–68, 1968–69, 1969–70
- Glasgow Cup (5): 1961–62, 1963–64, 1964–65, 1966–67, 1967–68
