= Pat Delaney (footballer) =

Scottish footballer (born 1940)

Personal information
- Full name: Patrick James Delaney
- Date of birth: 1940 (age 85–86)
- Place of birth: Cleland, Scotland
- Height: 6 ft 0 in (1.83 m)
- Position: Central defender

Senior career*
Years	Team	Apps	(Gls)
–	Douglas Water Thistle		
1959–1966	Motherwell	164	(22)
1966–1968	Dunfermline Athletic	29	(9)
1968–1969	Clyde	13	(2)
1969–1972	Airdrieonians	62	(1)
1972–1973	Clydebank	13	(1)
1973–1974	Albion Rovers	17	(0)
Total		298	(35)

International career
1964	SFA trial v SFL	1	(0)
- * Club domestic league appearances and goals

Patrick James Delaney (born 1940) is a Scottish former footballer who played for several clubs, primarily Motherwell and Airdrieonians, as a central defender – though he began his career as a centre forward and could also play at full-back. He was Motherwell's 'player of the year' in the 1964–65 season.

His father Jimmy Delaney and his nephew John Kennedy were also footballers, both of whom played for Celtic and Scotland.
