= 1966–67 Scottish Cup =

Tournament details
- Country: Scotland

Final positions
- Champions: Celtic
- Runners-up: Aberdeen

The 1966–67 Scottish Cup was the 82nd season of Scotland's most prestigious football knockout competition. The Cup was won by Celtic who defeated Aberdeen in the final.

== Preliminary round 1 ==
Home team	Score	Away team
Chirnside United	1 – 7	Elgin City
Forfar Athletic	1 – 0	East Stirlingshire
Hawick Royal Albert	4 – 1	Gala Fairydean
Nairn County	0 – 3	Stenhousemuir
Rothes	1 – 2	Clydebank
Vale of Leithen	1 – 8	Berwick Rangers

== Preliminary round 2 ==
Home team	Score	Away team
Hawick Royal Albert	1 – 1	Elgin City
Queen's Park	3 – 0	Stenhousemuir
Albion Rovers	0 – 1	Cowdenbeath
Alloa Athletic	2 – 1	Montrose
Berwick Rangers	2 – 0	Forfar Athletic
Brechin City	1 – 0	Third Lanark
Dumbarton	2 – 0	Clydebank
Inverness Caledonian	0 – 0	Stranraer

=== Replays ===
Home team	Score	Away team
Elgin City	2 – 0	Hawick Royal Albert
Stranraer	1 – 2	Inverness Caledonian

== First round ==
Home team	Score	Away team
Berwick Rangers	1 – 0	Rangers
Celtic	4 – 0	Arbroath
Dundee	0 – 5	Aberdeen
Elgin City	2 – 0	Ayr United
Falkirk	3 – 1	Alloa Athletic
Hearts	0 – 3	Dundee United
Hibernian	2 – 0	Brechin City
Inverness Caledonian	1 – 3	Hamilton Academical
Kilmarnock	2 – 2	Dunfermline Athletic
Greenock Morton	0 – 1	Clyde
Motherwell	0 – 1	East Fife
Partick Thistle	3 – 0	Dumbarton
Queen's Park	3 – 2	Raith Rovers
St Johnstone	4 – 0	Queen of the South
St Mirren	1 – 1	Cowdenbeath
Stirling Albion	1 – 2	Airdrieonians

=== Replays ===
Home team	Score	Away team
Cowdenbeath	0 – 2	St Mirren
Dunfermline Athletic	1 – 0	Kilmarnock

== Second round ==
Home team	Score	Away team
Aberdeen	5 – 0	St Johnstone
Celtic	7 – 0	Elgin City
Clyde	4 – 1	East Fife
Dundee United	1 – 0	Falkirk
Hibernian	1 – 0	Berwick Rangers
Partick Thistle	1 – 1	Dunfermline Athletic
Queen's Park	1 – 1	Airdrieonians
St Mirren	0 – 1	Hamilton Academical

=== Replays ===
Home team	Score	Away team
Dunfermline Athletic	5 – 1	Partick Thistle
Airdrieonians	1 – 2	Queen's Park

== Quarter-finals ==
Home team	Score	Away team
Celtic	5 – 3	Queen's Park
Clyde	0 – 0	Hamilton Academical
Dundee United	1 – 0	Dunfermline Athletic
Hibernian	1 – 1	Aberdeen

=== Replays ===
Home team	Score	Away team
Aberdeen	3 – 0	Hibernian
Hamilton Academical	1 – 5	Clyde

== Semi-finals ==
1 April 1967

Aberdeen	1 – 0	Dundee United
Millar 4' (o.g.)	Report

Dens Park, Dundee
Attendance: 41,500
Referee: Tiny Wharton

1 April 1967

Celtic	0 – 0	Clyde
	Report

Hampden Park, Glasgow
Attendance: 56,704
Referee: John Gordon

=== Replay ===
5 April 1967

Celtic	2 – 0	Clyde
Lennox 3'; Auld 22'	Report

Hampden Park, Glasgow
Attendance: 55,138
Referee: John Gordon

== Final ==
29 April 1967

Celtic	2 – 0	Aberdeen
William Wallace 42' 49'

Hampden Park, Glasgow
Attendance: 126,102
Referee: Willie Syme

== See also ==
- 1966–67 in Scottish football
- 1966–67 Scottish League Cup
