= Bobby Lennox =

Scottish footballer (born 1943)

Bobby Lennox MBE
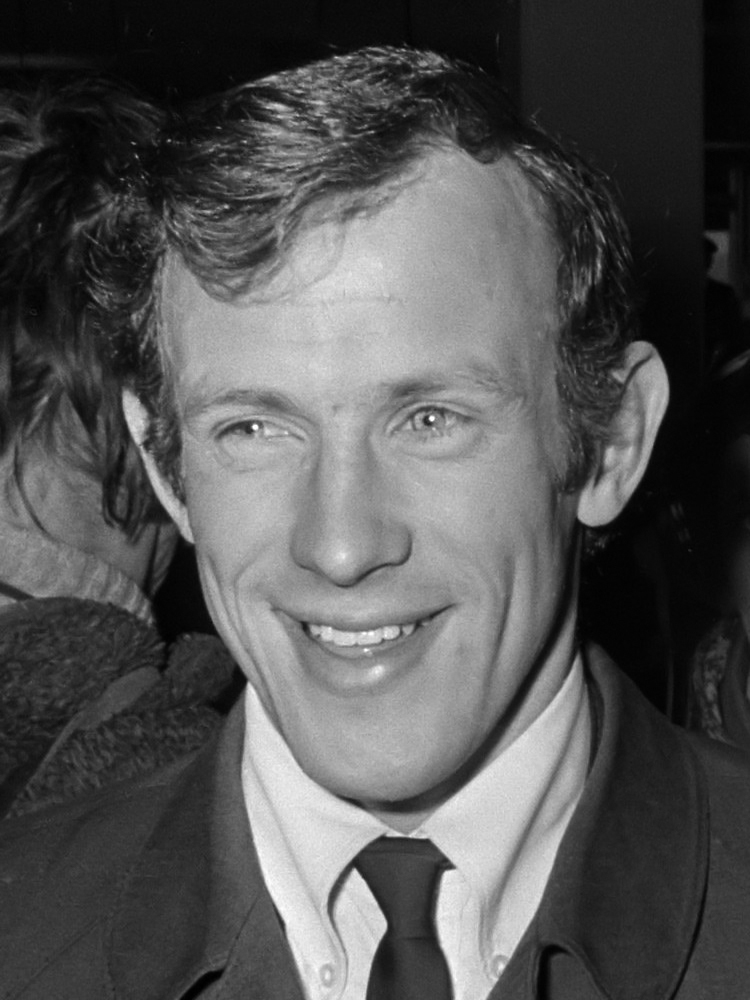
- Lennox in 1971

Personal information
- Full name: Robert Lennox
- Date of birth: 30 August 1943 (age 83)
- Place of birth: Saltcoats, Scotland
- Height: 1.72 m (5 ft 8 in)
- Position: Outside left

Youth career
- Ardeer Recreation F.C.

Senior career*
Years	Team	Apps	(Gls)
1961–1978	Celtic	294	(157)
1978	Houston Hurricane	30	(3)
1978–1981	Celtic	42	(10)
Total		366	(170)

International career
1966–1970	Scotland	10	(3)
1966–1968	Scottish League XI	3	(2)
- * Club domestic league appearances and goals

Robert Lennox (born 30 August 1943) is a Scottish former footballer who played for Celtic and was a member of their 1967 European Cup-winning team, known as the Lisbon Lions. Lennox earned ten international caps for Scotland. With 25 trophies, including 11 league titles, he one of Celtic's most decorated players. In 2002, Celtic supporters voted him a member of the club's all-time team.

== Club career ==
Celtic signed Lennox from Scottish Junior team Ardeer Recreation on provisional forms in 1961 at the age of 18, and he made his first team debut the following March. He went on to score 301 goals in all competitions, second only to Celtic's all-time top scorer Jimmy McGrory's total of 468 goals. Of those, 171 were scored in the Scottish league, making him the fifth-highest league scorer for Celtic. He placed third for the European Golden Boot in 1967–68.

He won 11 League medals, eight Scottish Cup medals, and five League Cup medals (scoring 63 goals in the competition) and was a member of the 1967 European Cup-winning Celtic team, the Lisbon Lions, who defeated Inter Milan 2–1 in the Estádio Nacional stadium in Lisbon, Portugal.

He played in a second European Cup final with Celtic in 1970, losing 2–1 after extra time to Feyenoord Rotterdam of the Netherlands at the San Siro stadium, Milan. He was an extremely fast winger and was known by fans as 'Buzz Bomb' or 'Lemon' as they thought he made defenders look like 'suckers'.

He left Celtic in March 1978, and moved to the United States to play for Houston Hurricane in their debut season in the NASL. After a disappointing three goals in 30 games for a struggling team, he got a surprise offer to rejoin Celtic in September 1978. It was a good move, as Celtic took the League Championship that year and the Scottish Cup in 1980. He was the last Lisbon Lion to retire as a player when he joined Celtic's coaching staff in November 1980.

== International career ==
Lennox made his debut for Scotland in a 2–1 victory over Northern Ireland in 1966, going on to win 10 international caps and scoring three goals in the process. He scored one of the goals in the famous victory over the then reigning FIFA World Cup holders England at Wembley in 1967, England's first defeat since winning the trophy. The goal made him the first Celtic player to score for Scotland at Wembley, and he later said it was a major moment in his life.

Although he thought there was no particular bias, he believes that he and several of his Celtic teammates should have received more caps than they were given. His last appearance for Scotland was against Wales in 1970 at Hampden Park which resulted in a 0–0 draw.

== Style of play ==
Possessing incredible speed and acceleration, Lennox cemented a reputation as a prolific goalscorer on the left wing. Regarding Lennox, Bobby Charlton said: "If I'd had Lennox in my team, I could have played forever. He was one of the best strikers I have ever seen." Alfredo Di Stefano, who played against Lennox in his testimonial match, recalled: "The Scotsman who gave me the most trouble was Bobby Lennox of Celtic. My testimonial at the Bernabeu was against Celtic as, of course, they were the champions of Europe in 1967, and although I remember the Bernabeu rising to Jimmy Johnstone, I admired Lennox greatly."

== Personal life ==
He was inducted into the Scottish Football Hall of Fame in November 2005 and was also appointed a Member of the Order of the British Empire (MBE) in the 1981 New Year Honours "for services to the Glasgow Celtic Football Club." Lennox published his autobiography, A Million Miles For Celtic, in 1982.

He continues his connection with Celtic as a match day host and is the Honorary President of the Houston Bobby Lennox Celtic Club. His son Gary carried on the family's footballing tradition, playing professionally for Dundee, Ayr United and Falkirk. He married his wife Kathryn (who converted to his Catholic faith) in 1967.

== Career statistics ==
=== International appearances ===
Appearances and goals by national team and year
National team	Year	Apps	Goals
Scotland	1966	1	1
Scotland	1967	3	1
Scotland	1968	4	1
Scotland	1969	1	0
Scotland	1970	1	0
Total		10	3

=== International goals ===
Scores and results list Scotland's goal tally first

No.	Date	Venue	Opponent	Score	Result	Competition	Ref
1.	16 November 1966	Hampden Park, Glasgow	Northern Ireland	2–1	2–1	1966–67 British Home Championship	
2.	15 April 1967	Wembley Stadium, London	England	2–0	3–2	1966–67 British Home Championship	
3.	16 October 1968	Idraetsparken, Copenhagen	Denmark	1–0	1–0	Friendly match	
