= 1966–67 Scottish Division One =

61st season of top-tier football league in Scotland

Scottish Division One
- Season: 1966–67
- Champions: Celtic
- Relegated: St Mirren; Ayr United

The 1966–67 Scottish Division One was won by Celtic by three points over city rivals Rangers. St Mirren and Ayr United finished 17th and 18th respectively and were relegated to the 1967–68 Second Division.

== League table ==
Pos	Team	Pld	W	D	L	GF	GA	GD	Pts	Qualification
1	Celtic	34	26	6	2	111	33	+78	58	
2	Rangers	34	24	7	3	92	31	+61	55	
3	Clyde	34	20	6	8	64	48	+16	46	
4	Aberdeen	34	17	8	9	72	38	+34	42	
5	Hibernian	34	19	4	11	72	49	+23	42	
6	Dundee	34	16	9	9	74	51	+23	41	
7	Kilmarnock	34	16	8	10	59	46	+13	40	
8	Dunfermline Athletic	34	14	10	10	72	52	+20	38	
9	Dundee United	34	14	9	11	68	62	+6	37	
10	Motherwell	34	10	11	13	59	60	−1	31	
11	Hearts	34	11	8	15	39	48	−9	30	
12	Partick Thistle	34	9	12	13	49	68	−19	30	
13	Airdrieonians	34	11	6	17	41	53	−12	28	
14	Falkirk	34	11	4	19	33	70	−37	26	
15	St Johnstone	34	10	5	19	53	73	−20	25	
16	Stirling Albion	34	5	9	20	31	85	−54	19	
17	St Mirren (R)	34	4	7	23	25	81	−56	15	Relegated to the Second Division
18	Ayr United (R)	34	1	7	26	20	86	−66	9	Relegated to the Second Division

Source: RSSSF
(R) Relegated

== Results ==
Home \ Away	ABE	AIR	AYR	CEL	CLY	DND	DNU	DNF	FAL	HOM	HIB	KIL	MOT	PAR	RAN	STJ	STM	STI
Aberdeen		7–0	2–0	1–1	1–1	5–2	0–1	1–2	6–1	3–1	2–1	4–0	2–1	5–2	1–2	3–2	0–0	1–0
Airdrieonians	1–2		3–1	0–3	2–3	1–4	2–2	0–3	1–0	1–2	0–1	1–4	2–0	3–1	0–1	2–0	1–0	7–0
Ayr United	2–5	0–1		0–5	0–1	1–1	0–7	0–0	0–1	0–1	0–2	2–3	3–3	1–2	1–4	1–0	0–0	0–1
Celtic	0–0	3–0	5–1		5–1	5–1	2–3	3–2	5–0	3–0	2–0	2–0	4–2	6–2	2–0	6–1	1–1	7–3
Clyde	0–0	1–0	0–0	0–3		1–3	2–0	1–0	4–0	2–1	5–1	1–3	3–1	4–1	1–5	2–0	2–1	0–1
Dundee	2–1	0–0	3–0	1–2	3–4		2–3	3–1	4–1	1–1	2–1	1–1	3–0	0–0	1–1	4–0	2–0	2–0
Dundee United	1–3	3–1	4–0	3–2	4–3	1–4		2–4	4–4	2–0	1–3	1–1	1–1	2–2	2–3	1–0	2–2	2–0
Dunfermline Athletic	1–1	0–1	6–0	4–5	4–0	0–1	3–3		4–0	1–0	5–6	1–1	2–1	3–2	3–2	4–1	2–0	3–3
Falkirk	1–0	2–1	5–3	0–3	0–2	3–2	0–3	1–0		2–1	0–2	0–1	0–1	1–0	0–1	0–3	2–0	1–1
Heart of Midlothian	0–3	1–1	1–0	0–3	0–1	3–1	2–1	1–1	1–1		0–0	1–0	1–2	0–0	1–1	1–0	4–0	5–1
Hibernian	1–0	0–2	4–1	3–5	1–1	2–1	2–2	2–0	3–1	3–1		3–1	2–1	7–0	1–2	2–5	1–1	6–0
Kilmarnock	1–1	1–0	1–0	0–0	1–3	4–4	4–0	1–1	3–0	1–2	2–1		3–0	0–0	1–2	5–3	3–0	2–1
Motherwell	3–2	2–2	0–0	0–2	1–1	5–3	1–1	6–2	1–2	1–0	1–2	2–0		5–0	1–5	3–3	4–0	1–1
Partick Thistle	1–1	2–2	4–1	1–4	0–1	0–0	3–0	0–0	1–0	1–1	1–4	1–2	2–2		1–1	3–0	2–2	2–0
Rangers	3–0	3–0	4–0	2–2	1–1	2–2	3–1	0–1	5–0	5–1	1–0	3–0	5–1	6–1		4–3	3–0	4–0
St Johnstone	1–0	1–0	3–0	0–4	2–4	0–3	2–0	3–3	2–1	3–2	1–2	1–3	1–1	3–5	1–1		3–0	4–1
St Mirren	1–3	0–3	3–1	0–5	1–3	0–5	0–1	0–5	1–2	3–0	1–3	3–2	0–5	0–3	1–6	0–0		4–0
Stirling Albion	2–6	0–0	1–1	1–1	2–5	2–3	1–4	1–1	1–1	0–3	1–0	1–4	0–0	1–3	0–1	2–1	2–0	

Legend: Blue = home team win; Yellow = draw; Red = away team win.

== Awards ==
Award	Winner	Club
SFWA Footballer of the Year	(Scotland) Ronnie Simpson	Celtic

== See also ==
- Nine in a row
