= 1966–67 Scottish League Cup =

Tournament details
- Country: Scotland

Final positions
- Champions: Celtic
- Runners-up: Rangers

The 1966–67 Scottish League Cup was the twenty-first season of Scotland's second football knockout competition. The competition was won for the second successive season by Celtic, who defeated Rangers in the Final.

== First round ==
=== Group 1 ===
Team	Pld	W	D	L	GF	GA	GR	Pts
Aberdeen	6	6	0	0	20	7	2.857	12
Dundee United	6	2	2	2	13	13	1.000	6
Dundee	6	1	2	3	8	11	0.727	4
St Johnstone	6	0	2	4	6	16	0.375	2

Home team	Score	Away team	Date
Aberdeen	3–0	St Johnstone	13 August 1966
Dundee United	2–0	Dundee	13 August 1966
Dundee	3–4	Aberdeen	17 August 1966
St Johnstone	1–1	Dundee United	17 August 1966
Aberdeen	4–1	Dundee United	20 August 1966
Dundee	2–0	St Johnstone	20 August 1966
Dundee	1–1	Dundee United	27 August 1966
St Johnstone	0–3	Aberdeen	27 August 1966
Aberdeen	2–0	Dundee	31 August 1966
Dundee United	5–3	St Johnstone	31 August 1966
Dundee United	3–4	Aberdeen	3 September 1966
St Johnstone	2–2	Dundee	3 September 1966

=== Group 2 ===
Team	Pld	W	D	L	GF	GA	GR	Pts
Rangers	6	3	2	1	13	4	3.250	8
Hibernian	6	4	0	2	12	9	1.333	8
Kilmarnock	6	2	2	2	6	3	2.000	6
Stirling Albion	6	0	2	4	3	18	0.167	2

Home team	Score	Away team	Date
Kilmarnock	2–0	Stirling Albion	13 August 1966
Rangers	1–0	Hibernian	13 August 1966
Hibernian	2–1	Kilmarnock	17 August 1966
Stirling Albion	0–8	Rangers	17 August 1966
Rangers	0–0	Kilmarnock	20 August 1966
Stirling Albion	2–4	Hibernian	20 August 1966
Hibernian	3–2	Rangers	27 August 1966
Stirling Albion	0–0	Kilmarnock	27 August 1966
Kilmarnock	3–0	Hibernian	31 August 1966
Rangers	1–1	Stirling Albion	31 August 1966
Hibernian	3–0	Stirling Albion	3 September 1966
Kilmarnock	0–1	Rangers	3 September 1966

=== Group 3 ===
Team	Pld	W	D	L	GF	GA	GR	Pts
Dunfermline Athletic	6	4	1	1	15	10	1.500	9
Motherwell	6	3	2	1	13	7	1.857	8
Partick Thistle	6	1	2	3	3	10	0.300	4
Falkirk	6	0	3	3	5	9	0.556	3

Home team	Score	Away team	Date
Dunfermline Athletic	2–1	Motherwell	13 August 1966
Falkirk	0–0	Partick Thistle	13 August 1966
Motherwell	2–2	Falkirk	17 August 1966
Partick Thistle	0–3	Dunfermline Athletic	17 August 1966
Dunfermline Athletic	2–2	Falkirk	20 August 1966
Motherwell	4–0	Partick Thistle	20 August 1966
Motherwell	4–3	Dunfermline Athletic	27 August 1966
Partick Thistle	1–0	Falkirk	27 August 1966
Dunfermline Athletic	3–2	Partick Thistle	31 August 1966
Falkirk	0–2	Motherwell	31 August 1966
Falkirk	1–2	Dunfermline Athletic	3 September 1966
Partick Thistle	0–0	Motherwell	3 September 1966

=== Group 4 ===
Team	Pld	W	D	L	GF	GA	GR	Pts
Celtic	6	6	0	0	23	3	7.667	12
Heart of Midlothian	6	3	1	2	10	10	1.000	7
Clyde	6	2	0	4	7	16	0.438	4
St Mirren	6	0	1	5	3	14	0.214	1

Home team	Score	Away team	Date
Clyde	1–0	St Mirren	13 August 1966
Heart of Midlothian	0–2	Celtic	13 August 1966
Celtic	6–0	Clyde	17 August 1966
St Mirren	0–0	Heart of Midlothian	17 August 1966
Celtic	8–2	St Mirren	20 August 1966
Heart of Midlothian	4–3	Clyde	20 August 1966
Celtic	3–0	Heart of Midlothian	27 August 1966
St Mirren	0–1	Clyde	27 August 1966
Clyde	1–3	Celtic	31 August 1966
Heart of Midlothian	3–1	St Mirren	31 August 1966
Clyde	1–3	Heart of Midlothian	3 September 1966
St Mirren	0–1	Celtic	3 September 1966

=== Group 5 ===
Team	Pld	W	D	L	GF	GA	GR	Pts
Ayr United	6	2	3	1	9	6	1.500	7
Cowdenbeath	6	2	3	1	7	8	0.875	7
Raith Rovers	6	2	2	2	8	6	1.333	6
Berwick Rangers	6	0	4	2	3	7	0.429	4

Home team	Score	Away team	Date
Berwick Rangers	1–1	Ayr United	13 August 1966
Raith Rovers	1–2	Cowdenbeath	13 August 1966
Ayr United	0–0	Raith Rovers	17 August 1966
Cowdenbeath	0–0	Berwick Rangers	17 August 1966
Ayr United	2–2	Cowdenbeath	20 August 1966
Berwick Rangers	1–1	Raith Rovers	20 August 1966
Ayr United	2–0	Berwick Rangers	27 August 1966
Cowdenbeath	2–1	Raith Rovers	27 August 1966
Berwick Rangers	1–1	Cowdenbeath	31 August 1966
Raith Rovers	3–1	Ayr United	31 August 1966
Cowdenbeath	0–3	Ayr United	3 September 1966
Raith Rovers	2–0	Berwick Rangers	3 September 1966

=== Group 6 ===
Team	Pld	W	D	L	GF	GA	GR	Pts
Morton	6	5	1	0	9	3	3.000	11
Arbroath	6	2	3	1	5	4	1.250	7
East Fife	6	1	2	3	7	9	0.778	4
Third Lanark	6	0	2	4	7	12	0.583	2

Home team	Score	Away team	Date
Arbroath	2–0	Third Lanark	13 August 1966
Morton	2–1	East Fife	13 August 1966
East Fife	0–0	Arbroath	17 August 1966
Third Lanark	0–1	Morton	17 August 1966
Arbroath	0–0	Morton	20 August 1966
East Fife	2–2	Third Lanark	20 August 1966
East Fife	0–1	Morton	27 August 1966
Third Lanark	1–1	Arbroath	27 August 1966
Arbroath	2–1	East Fife	31 August 1966
Morton	3–2	Third Lanark	31 August 1966
Morton	2–0	Arbroath	3 September 1966
Third Lanark	2–3	East Fife	3 September 1966

=== Group 7 ===
Team	Pld	W	D	L	GF	GA	GR	Pts
Queen of the South	6	4	2	0	20	6	3.333	10
Airdrieonians	6	4	1	1	12	8	1.500	9
Dumbarton	6	1	1	4	8	12	0.667	3
Queen's Park	6	1	0	5	7	21	0.333	2

Home team	Score	Away team	Date
Airdrieonians	3–0	Dumbarton	13 August 1966
Queen's Park	1–5	Queen of the South	13 August 1966
Dumbarton	1–2	Queen's Park	17 August 1966
Queen of the South	3–0	Airdrieonians	17 August 1966
Dumbarton	1–1	Queen of the South	20 August 1966
Queen's Park	1–3	Airdrieonians	20 August 1966
Dumbarton	1–2	Airdrieonians	27 August 1966
Queen of the South	6–1	Queen's Park	27 August 1966
Airdrieonians	1–1	Queen of the South	31 August 1966
Queen's Park	0–3	Dumbarton	31 August 1966
Airdrieonians	3–2	Queen's Park	3 September 1966
Queen of the South	4–2	Dumbarton	3 September 1966

=== Group 8 ===
Team	Pld	W	D	L	GF	GA	GR	Pts
Montrose	6	3	2	1	9	5	1.800	8
Alloa	6	3	0	3	9	5	1.800	6
Hamilton Academical	6	2	1	3	6	8	0.750	5
Albion Rovers	6	1	3	2	3	9	0.333	5

Home team	Score	Away team	Date
Alloa	4–0	Albion Rovers	13 August 1966
Hamilton Academical	1–3	Montrose	13 August 1966
Albion Rovers	0–0	Hamilton Academical	17 August 1966
Montrose	2–1	Alloa	17 August 1966
Albion Rovers	0–0	Montrose	20 August 1966
Alloa	3–1	Hamilton Academical	20 August 1966
Albion Rovers	1–0	Alloa	27 August 1966
Montrose	2–0	Hamilton Academical	27 August 1966
Alloa	1–0	Montrose	31 August 1966
Hamilton Academical	3–0	Albion Rovers	31 August 1966
Hamilton Academical	1–0	Alloa	3 September 1966
Montrose	2–2	Albion Rovers	3 September 1966

=== Group 9 ===
Team	Pld	W	D	L	GF	GA	GR	Pts
Brechin City	5	4	1	0	14	3	4.667	9
Forfar Athletic	5	3	1	1	12	6	2.000	7
Stranraer	5	2	2	1	5	4	1.250	6
Clydebank	5	2	0	3	8	8	1.000	4
Stenhousemuir	5	0	2	3	5	12	0.417	2
East Stirlingshire	5	0	2	3	2	13	0.154	2

Home team	Score	Away team	Date
Brechin City	4–0	Stenhousemuir	13 August 1966
Clydebank	3–0	East Stirlingshire	13 August 1966
Stranraer	2–1	Forfar Athletic	13 August 1966
East Stirlingshire	0–4	Brechin City	17 August 1966
Forfar Athletic	2–1	Clydebank	17 August 1966
Stenhousemuir	1–1	Stranraer	17 August 1966
Brechin City	3–1	Clydebank	20 August 1966
East Stirlingshire	0–0	Stranraer	20 August 1966
Stenhousemuir	1–3	Forfar Athletic	20 August 1966
East Stirlingshire	1–1	Stenhousemuir	27 August 1966
Forfar Athletic	1–1	Brechin City	27 August 1966
Stranraer	1–0	Clydebank	27 August 1966
Clydebank	3–2	Stenhousemuir	3 September 1966
Forfar Athletic	5–1	East Stirlingshire	3 September 1966
Stranraer	1–2	Brechin City	3 September 1966

== Supplementary round ==
=== First leg ===
Home team	Score	Away team	Date
Brechin City	1–2	Morton	5 September 1966

=== Second leg ===
Home team	Score	Away team	Date	Agg
Morton	5–2	Brechin City	7 September 1966	7–3

== Quarter-finals ==
=== First leg ===
Home team	Score	Away team	Date
Ayr United	1–1	Rangers	14 September 1966
Celtic	6–3	Dunfermline Athletic	14 September 1966
Montrose	3–3	Airdrieonians	14 September 1966
Morton	3–1	Aberdeen	14 September 1966

=== Second leg ===
Home team	Score	Away team	Date	Agg
Aberdeen	3–0	Morton	21 September 1966	4–3
Airdrieonians	5–1	Montrose	21 September 1966	8–4
Dunfermline Athletic	1–3	Celtic	21 September 1966	4–9
Rangers	3–0	Ayr United	21 September 1966	4–1

== Semi-finals ==
=== Ties ===
Home team	Score	Away team	Date
Celtic	2–0	Airdrieonians	17 October 1966
Rangers	2–2	Aberdeen	19 October 1966

=== Replays ===
Home team	Score	Away team	Date
Rangers	2–0	Aberdeen	24 October 1966

== Final ==
29 October 1966

Rangers	0–1	Celtic
		Lennox

Hampden Park, Glasgow
Attendance: 94,532
