= 1961–62 Dundee F.C. season =

Scottish First Division football season

Dundee
1961–62 season
- Manager: Bob Shankly
- Division One: 1st (champions)
- Scottish Cup: 2nd round
- Scottish League Cup: Group Stage
- Top goalscorer: League: Alan Gilzean (24); All: Alan Gilzean (27)
- Highest home attendance: 35,000 vs Rangers, 14 March 1962 (League)
Home colours

The 1961–62 season was the 60th season of competitive football played by Dundee. Dundee finished in first place in Division One, winning their first (and to date only) Scottish League Championship. A 20-game unbeaten streak (17 of those being wins, 10 consecutive) served as the backbone for the Dark Blues most successful season ever. Dundee wrapped up the title in the final game of the season at Muirton Park, home of local rivals St Johnstone. In a triumphant day for those in dark blue, Alan Gilzean scored twice and Andy Penman got one of his own to ensure a comfortable 0–3 victory, simultaneously relegating St Johnstone and confirming Dundee as champions.

== Scottish Division One ==
Statistics provided by Dee Archive.

| Date | Opponent | Venue | Result | Dundee Scorer(s) | Attendance |
|---|---|---|---|---|---|
| 23 August 1961 | Falkirk | A | 3–1 | Smith, Cousin, Wishart | 7,000 |
| 9 September 1961 | Dundee United | H | 4–1 | Penman, Smith, Briggs (o.g.), Robertson | 18,765 |
| 16 September 1961 | Aberdeen | A | 1–3 | Gilzean | 12,000 |
| 23 September 1961 | Heart of Midlothian | H | 2–0 | Gilzean (2) | 10,921 |
| 30 September 1961 | Third Lanark | A | 3–1 | Gilzean (2), Cousin | 9,500 |
| 7 October 1961 | Kilmarnock | H | 5–3 | Watson (o.g.), Penman (3), Gilzean | 14,000 |
| 14 October 1961 | Motherwell | A | 4–2 | Penman, Cousin, Smith, Gilzean | 15,000 |
| 21 October 1961 | Dunfermline Athletic | A | 2–1 | Cousin (2) | 10,000 |
| 28 October 1961 | Partick Thistle | H | 3–2 | Cousin (2), Penman | 16,000 |
| 4 November 1961 | Celtic | H | 2–1 | Wishart, Gilzean | 23,654 |
| 11 November 1961 | Rangers | A | 5–1 | Gilzean (4), Penman | 38,000 |
| 18 November 1961 | Raith Rovers | H | 5–4 | Gilzean (2), Wishart, Seith, Smith | 15,000 |
| 25 November 1961 | Hibernian | A | 3–1 | Gilzean, Penman, Smith | 14,764 |
| 2 December 1961 | Stirling Albion | H | 2–2 | Robertson, Cousin | 11,500 |
| 16 December 1961 | Airdrieonians | H | 5–1 | Wishart, Smith, Cousin, Robertson (2) | 11,500 |
| 23 December 1961 | St Mirren | A | 1–1 | Wishart | 8,991 |
| 6 January 1962 | Falkirk | H | 2–1 | Gilzean (2) | 15,000 |
| 13 January 1962 | Heart of Midlothian | A | 2–0 | Cousin, Gilzean | 17,981 |
| 17 January 1962 | Aberdeen | H | 2–1 | Cousin, Penman | 16,000 |
| 20 January 1962 | Third Lanark | H | 2–1 | Penman, Robertson | 17,500 |
| 24 January 1962 | St Johnstone | H | 2–1 | Gilzean, Penman | 16,000 |
| 3 February 1962 | Kilmarnock | A | 1–1 | Cousin | 14,000 |
| 10 February 1962 | Motherwell | H | 1–3 | Robertson | 19,000 |
| 24 February 1962 | Partick Thistle | A | 0–3 | | 15,000 |
| 3 March 1962 | Celtic | A | 1–2 | Wishart | 38,360 |
| 6 March 1962 | Dunfermline Athletic | H | 1–2 | Seith | 17,500 |
| 14 March 1962 | Rangers | H | 0–0 | | 35,000 |
| 17 March 1962 | Raith Rovers | A | 3–2 | Cousin, Penman (2) | 5,000 |
| 24 March 1962 | Hibernian | H | 1–0 | Waddell | 10,710 |
| 31 March 1962 | Stirling Albion | A | 3–2 | Cousin, Smith, Gilzean | 4,500 |
| 7 April 1962 | Airdrieonians | A | 2–1 | Penman (2) | 7,000 |
| 9 April 1962 | Dundee United | A | 2–1 | Gilzean (2) | 21,138 |
| 25 April 1962 | St Mirren | H | 2–0 | Cousin, Penman | 18,712 |
| 28 April 1962 | St Johnstone | A | 3–0 | Gilzean (2) 24', 59, Penman 67' | 26,500 |

=== League table ===
| Pos | Team | Pld | W | D | L | GF | GA | GR | Pts | Qualification or relegation |
|---|---|---|---|---|---|---|---|---|---|---|
| 1 | Dundee (C) | 34 | 25 | 4 | 5 | 80 | 46 | 1.739 | 54 | Qualified for the European Cup |
| 2 | Rangers | 34 | 22 | 7 | 5 | 84 | 31 | 2.710 | 51 | Qualified for the Cup Winners' Cup |
| 3 | Celtic | 34 | 19 | 8 | 7 | 81 | 37 | 2.189 | 46 | Invited for the Inter-Cities Fairs Cup |
| 4 | Dunfermline Athletic | 34 | 19 | 5 | 10 | 77 | 46 | 1.674 | 43 | Invited for the Inter-Cities Fairs Cup |
| 5 | Kilmarnock | 34 | 16 | 10 | 8 | 74 | 58 | 1.276 | 42 | |

Source: RSSSF
(C) Champions

dundee 12th

== Scottish League Cup ==
Statistics provided by Dee Archive.

| Date | Rd | Opponent | Venue | Result | Dundee Scorer(s) | Attendance |
|---|---|---|---|---|---|---|
| 12 August 1961 | G3 | Airdrieonians | H | 2–0 | Wishart, Cousin | 13,000 |
| 16 August 1961 | G3 | Rangers | A | 2–4 | Penman, Cousin | 40,000 |
| 19 August 1961 | G3 | Third Lanark | A | 2–3 | Smith, Gilzean | 12,000 |
| 26 August 1961 | G3 | Airdrieonians | A | 5–0 | Cousin, Smith, Penman, Gilzean (2) | 4,500 |
| 30 August 1961 | G3 | Rangers | H | 1–1 | Robertson | 24,000 |
| 2 September 1961 | G3 | Third Lanark | H | 2–2 | Cousin, Penman | 9,000 |

=== Group 3 table ===
| Team | Pld | W | D | L | GF | GA | GR | Pts |
|---|---|---|---|---|---|---|---|---|
| Rangers | 6 | 5 | 1 | 0 | 18 | 5 | 3.600 | 11 |
| Dundee | 6 | 2 | 2 | 2 | 14 | 10 | 1.400 | 6 |
| Third Lanark | 6 | 2 | 2 | 2 | 10 | 14 | 0.714 | 6 |
| Airdrieonians | 6 | 0 | 1 | 5 | 5 | 18 | 0.278 | 1 |

== Scottish Cup ==
Statistics provided by Dee Archive.

| Date | Rd | Opponent | Venue | Result | Dundee Scorer(s) | Attendance |
|---|---|---|---|---|---|---|
| 27 January 1962 | R2 | St Mirren | H | 0–1 | | 22,834 |

== Squad and statistics ==
=== First team squad ===
Note: Flags indicate national team as defined under FIFA eligibility rules; some limited exceptions apply. Players may hold more than one non-FIFA nationality.

| No. | Pos. | Nation | Player |
|---|---|---|---|
| — | GK | SCO | Pat Liney |
| — | DF | SCO | Bobby Cox |
| — | DF | SCO | Alex Hamilton |
| — | DF | SCO | Alex Stuart |
| — | MF | SCO | Craig Brown |
| — | MF | SCO | Hugh Robertson |
| — | MF | SCO | Bobby Seith |
| — | MF | SCO | Ian Ure |

| No. | Pos. | Nation | Player |
|---|---|---|---|
| — | FW | SCO | Alan Cousin |
| — | FW | SCO | George McGeachie |
| — | FW | SCO | Alan Gilzean |
| — | FW | SCO | Andy Penman |
| — | FW | SCO | Gordon Smith |
| — | FW | SCO | Bobby Waddell |
| — | FW | SCO | Bobby Wishart |

=== Player statistics ===
Statistics provided by Dee Archive

| No. | Pos | Nat | Player | Total | | Division One | | Scottish Cup | | League Cup | |
| No. | Pos | Nat | Player | Apps | Goals | Apps | Goals | Apps | Goals | Apps | Goals |
|---|---|---|---|---|---|---|---|---|---|---|---|
| | MF | (Scotland) SCO | Craig Brown | 9 | 0 | 9 | 0 | 0 | 0 | 0 | 0 |
| | FW | (Scotland) SCO | Alan Cousin | 41 | 19 | 34 | 15 | 1 | 0 | 6 | 4 |
| | DF | (Scotland) SCO | Bobby Cox | 38 | 0 | 31 | 0 | 1 | 0 | 6 | 0 |
| | FW | (Scotland) SCO | Alan Gilzean | 35 | 27 | 29 | 24 | 1 | 0 | 5 | 3 |
| | DF | (Scotland) SCO | Alex Hamilton | 41 | 0 | 34 | 0 | 1 | 0 | 6 | 0 |
| | GK | (Scotland) SCO | Pat Liney | 41 | 0 | 34 | 0 | 1 | 0 | 6 | 0 |
| | FW | (Scotland) SCO | George McGeachie | 5 | 0 | 3 | 0 | 0 | 0 | 2 | 0 |
| | MF | (Scotland) SCO | Andy Penman | 39 | 20 | 32 | 17 | 1 | 0 | 6 | 3 |
| | FW | (Scotland) SCO | Hugh Robertson | 40 | 7 | 33 | 6 | 1 | 0 | 6 | 1 |
| | MF | (Scotland) SCO | Bobby Seith | 40 | 2 | 34 | 2 | 1 | 0 | 5 | 0 |
| | FW | (Scotland) SCO | Gordon Smith | 37 | 9 | 32 | 7 | 1 | 0 | 4 | 2 |
| | DF | (Scotland) SCO | Alex Stuart | 2 | 0 | 2 | 0 | 0 | 0 | 0 | 0 |
| | MF | (Scotland) SCO | Ian Ure | 41 | 0 | 34 | 0 | 1 | 0 | 6 | 0 |
| | FW | (Scotland) SCO | Bobby Waddell | 5 | 1 | 4 | 1 | 0 | 0 | 1 | 0 |
| | FW | (Scotland) SCO | Bobby Wishart | 36 | 7 | 29 | 6 | 1 | 0 | 6 | 1 |

== See also ==
- 1961–62 in Scottish football
