= 1962–63 Dundee F.C. season =

Scottish First Division football season

Dundee
1962–63 season
- Manager: Bob Shankly
- Scottish Division One: 9th W12 D9 L13 F60 A49 P33
- Scottish Cup: Quarter-finals
- League Cup: Group stage
- European Cup: Semi-finals
- Top goalscorer: League: Alan Gilzean (24); All: Alan Gilzean (41)
- Highest home attendance: 38,232 vs Anderlecht, 13 March 1963 (European Cup)
Home colours

The 1962–63 season was the 61st season of competitive football played by Dundee. The club finished in ninth place in Division One, as well as competing in the Scottish Cup, Scottish League Cup, and European Cup after winning the league the season prior.

Dundee's European Cup run was the main focus of the season, as the Dark Blues made it to the tournament's semi-finals. They recorded large victories throughout the campaign, including 8–1 against German champions 1. FC Köln, a 4–1 win over Portuguese side Sporting CP, home and away victories over R.S.C. Anderlecht, and an unlikely win over eventual European champions A.C. Milan.

Alan Gilzean was Dundee's top scorer with 24 in the league and 41 overall, including a 7-goal game against Queen of the South which tied Albert Juliussen's club record for most goals in a single game.

== Scottish Division One ==
Statistics provided by Dee Archive.

Date	Opponent	Venue	Result	Dundee Scorer(s)	Attendance
22 August 1962	Heart of Midlothian	A	1–3	Houston	14,399
8 September 1962	Aberdeen	H	2–2	Penman, Gilzean	12,000
15 September 1962	Dundee United	A	1–1	Cousin	15,627
22 September 1962	Clyde	H	2–0	Penman (2)	12,000
29 September 1962	Rangers	A	1–1	Robertson	57,000
6 October 1962	Falkirk	H	2–1	Cousin, Gilzean	3,500
13 October 1962	Hibernian	A	2–2	Penman, Cousin	10,739
20 October 1962	Kilmarnock	H	1–0	Gilzean	16,000
27 October 1962	Dunfermline Athletic	A	0–2		9,000
3 November 1962	Airdrieonians	H	2–1	Houston, Gilzean	12,000
10 November 1962	Partick Thistle	A	0–1		18,000
17 November 1962	Celtic	H	0–0		16,951
24 November 1962	Third Lanark	A	3–4	Cousin, Gilzean (2)	5,000
1 December 1962	Queen of the South	H	10–2	Gilzean (7), Penman, Ryden, Houston	12,000
8 December 1962	St Mirren	A	3–0	Campbell (o.g.), Cousin, Penman	4,711
15 December 1962	Motherwell	H	2–2	Gilzean, Wishart	13,000
22 December 1962	Raith Rovers	A	4–2	Gilzean (3), Penman	2,700
1 January 1963	Aberdeen	A	0–1		10,597
5 January 1963	Clyde	A	2–3	Gilzean (2)	7,000
9 March 1963	Airdrieonians	A	0–1		3,000
16 March 1963	Partick Thistle	H	2–1	Hogan (o.g.), Cameron	12,000
23 March 1963	Celtic	A	1–4	Gilzean	40,710
5 April 1963	Queen of the South	A	0–1		5,500
8 April 1963	Hibernian	H	1–3	Penman	9,398
13 April 1963	St Mirren	H	5–1	Houston, Waddell (3), Gilzean	10,000
17 April 1963	Dundee United	H	1–2	Waddell	14,967
20 April 1963	Motherwell	A	1–2	Gilzean	8,500
27 April 1963	Raith Rovers	H	1–1	Gilzean	9,000
6 May 1963	Heart of Midlothian	H	2–2	Penman (2)	9,141
11 May 1963	Kilmarnock	A	0–1		6,000
13 May 1963	Third Lanark	H	5–2	Smith (2), Cameron (2), Ryden	6,000
15 May 1963	Dunfermline Athletic	H	1–0	Cousin	12,000
18 May 1963	Falkirk	A	2–0	Gilzean, Smith	2,000
25 May 1963	Rangers	H	0–0		17,000

=== League table ===
Pos	Team	Pld	W	D	L	GF	GA	GR	Pts
7	Dundee United	34	15	11	8	67	52	1.288	41
8	Dunfermline	34	13	8	13	50	47	1.064	34
9	Dundee	34	12	9	13	60	49	1.224	33
10	Motherwell	34	10	11	13	60	63	0.952	31
11	Airdrieonians	34	14	2	18	52	76	0.684	30

Source: RSSSF

== European Cup ==
Statistics provided by Dee Archive.

Date	Rd	Opponent	Venue	Result	Dundee Scorer(s)	Attendance
5 September 1962	PR (1L)	(Germany) Köln	H	8–1	Hemmersbach (o.g.), Wishart, Robertson, Gilzean (3), Smith, Penman	23,821
26 September 1962	PR (2L)	(Germany) Köln	A	0–4		37,998
Dundee won 8–5 on aggregate
24 October 1962	FR (1L)	(Portugal) Sporting CP	A	0–1		45,000
31 October 1962	FR (2L)	(Portugal) Sporting CP	H	4–1	Gilzean (3), Cousin	30,596
Dundee won 4–2 on aggregate
6 March 1963	QF (1L)	(Belgium) Anderlecht	A	4–1	Gilzean (2), Cousin, Smith	64,703
13 March 1963	QF (2L)	(Belgium) Anderlecht	H	2–1	Cousin, Smith	38,232
Dundee won 6–2 on aggregate
24 April 1963	SF (1L)	(Italy) A.C. Milan	A	1–5	Cousin	73,933
1 May 1963	SF (2L)	(Italy) A.C. Milan	H	1–0	Gilzean	35,169
Milan won 5–2 on aggregate

== Scottish League Cup ==
Statistics provided by Dee Archive.

Date	Rd	Opponent	Venue	Result	Dundee Scorer(s)	Attendance
11 August 1962	G2	Dundee United	A	2–3	Gilzean (2)	22,917
15 August 1962	G2	Celtic	H	1–0	Smith	19,807
18 August 1962	G2	Heart of Midlothian	H	0–2		19,075
25 August 1962	G2	Dundee United	H	2–1	Smith (2)	18,493
29 August 1962	G2	Celtic	A	0–3		14,815
1 September 1962	G2	Heart of Midlothian	A	0–2		18,843

=== Group 2 table ===
Team	Pld	W	D	L	GF	GA	GR	Pts
Heart of Midlothian (A)	6	4	0	2	11	8	1.375	8
Celtic	6	3	1	2	12	5	2.400	7
Dundee United	6	2	1	3	7	11	0.636	5
Dundee	6	2	0	4	5	11	0.455	4

Source: statto.com
(A) Advanced to Supplementary Round

== Scottish Cup ==
Statistics provided by Dee Archive.

Date	Rd	Opponent	Venue	Result	Dundee Scorer(s)	Attendance
12 January 1963	R1	Caledonian	A	5–1	Penman (2), Robertson, Gilzean, Cousin	4,632
8 February 1963	R2	Montrose	H	8–0	Cousin (2), Gilzean (2), Wishart, Robertson, Waddell, Smith	12,062
18 March 1963	R3	Hibernian	H	1–0	Gilzean	16,000
30 March 1963	QF	Rangers	H	1–1	Penman	36,839
3 April 1963	QF(r)	Rangers	A	2–3	Gilzean (2)	81,190

== Squad and statistics ==
=== Player statistics ===
Statistics provided by Dee Archive

No.	Pos	Nat	Player	Total		Division One		Scottish Cup		League Cup		European Cup	
No.	Pos	Nat	Player	Apps	Goals	Apps	Goals	Apps	Goals	Apps	Goals	Apps	Goals
	MF	(Scotland) SCO	Craig Brown	5	0	4	0	0	0	1	0	0	0
	FW	(Scotland) SCO	Kenny Cameron	5	3	3	3	0	0	2	0	0	0
	FW	(Scotland) SCO	Alan Cousin	48	13	30	6	5	3	5	0	8	4
	DF	(Scotland) SCO	Bobby Cox	44	0	27	0	5	0	6	0	6	0
	FW	(Scotland) SCO	Alan Gilzean	43	41	27	24	5	6	3	2	8	9
	DF	(Scotland) SCO	Alex Hamilton	49	0	30	0	5	0	6	0	8	0
	MF	(Scotland) SCO	Doug Houston	23	4	17	4	0	0	3	0	3	0
	GK	(Scotland) SCO	Pat Liney	2	0	2	0	0	0	0	0	0	0
	FW	(Scotland) SCO	Tommy Mackle	3	0	3	0	0	0	0	0	0	0
	FW	(Scotland) SCO	George McGeachie	1	0	1	0	0	0	0	0	0	0
	MF	(Scotland) SCO	Andy Penman	52	14	34	10	4	3	6	0	8	1
	DF	(Scotland) SCO	Hugh Reid	4	0	4	0	0	0	0	0	0	0
	FW	(Scotland) SCO	Hugh Robertson	31	4	16	1	5	2	5	0	5	1
	MF	(Scotland) SCO	George Ryden	10	2	9	2	1	0	0	0	0	0
	MF	(Scotland) SCO	Bobby Seith	46	0	28	0	5	0	5	0	8	0
	GK	(Scotland) SCO	Bert Slater	51	0	32	0	5	0	6	0	8	0
	FW	(Scotland) SCO	Gordon Smith	48	10	29	3	5	1	6	3	8	3
	DF	(Scotland) SCO	Alex Stuart	11	0	8	0	0	0	1	0	2	0
	MF	(Scotland) SCO	Ian Ure	50	0	32	0	4	0	6	0	8	0
	FW	(Scotland) SCO	Bobby Waddell	10	5	9	4	1	1	0	0	0	0
	FW	(Scotland) SCO	Bobby Wishart	47	3	29	1	5	1	5	0	8	1

== See also ==
- 1962–63 in Scottish football
