= 1963–64 Dundee F.C. season =

Dundee
1963–64 season
- Manager: Bob Shankly
- Division One: 6th
- Scottish Cup: Finalists
- League Cup: Quarter-finals
- Summer Cup: Group Stage
- Top goalscorer: League: Alan Gilzean (33); All: Alan Gilzean (52)
Home colours

The 1963–64 season was the 62nd season in which Dundee competed at a Scottish national level, playing in Division One, where the club would finish in 6th place. Dundee would also compete in both the Scottish Cup and the Scottish League Cup. They would be knocked out of the Quarter-finals of the League Cup by Hibernian, and made it to the final of the Scottish Cup, where they lost Rangers. They would also compete in the revamped Summer Cup, being knocked out in the group stages.

Striker Alan Gilzean would break the club record for most goals in a single season, scoring 52 times in 48 appearances.

== Scottish Division One ==
Statistics provided by Dee Archive.

Match day	Date	Opponent	H/A	Score	Dundee scorer(s)	Attendance
1	21 August	Rangers	H	1–1	Seith	34,500
2	7 September	Aberdeen	A	4–2	Gilzean (2), Cameron, Penman	12,500
3	14 September	Dundee United	H	1–1	Gilzean	20,945
4	21 September	Third Lanark	A	2–1	Waddell, Gilzean	6,000
5	28 September	East Stirlingshire	H	3–1	Gilzean, Penman, Collumbine (o.g.)	11,000
6	5 October	Queen of the South	A	5–0	Waddell (2), Cousin, Gilzean (2)	5,500
7	12 October	Motherwell	H	1–3	Waddell	15,000
8	19 October	Hibernian	A	4–0	Gilzean (4)	11,071
9	26 October	Dunfermline Athletic	H	2–1	Cousin, Gilzean	17,500
10	2 November	St Mirren	A	1–2	Waddell	7,500
11	9 November	Airdrieonians	H	4–0	Cox, Penman, Gilzean (2) (pen.)	10,500
12	16 November	St Johnstone	A	6–1	Gilzean, Penman (2), Stuart, Richmond (o.g.), Waddell	12,000
13	23 November	Heart of Midlothian	A	3–1	Gilzean, Penman, Waddell	11,582
14	30 November	Celtic	H	1–1	Penman (pen.)	23,569
15	7 December	Kilmarnock	A	1–1	Gilzean	8,000
16	14 December	Partick Thistle	A	0–2		10,000
17	21 December	Falkirk	H	4–3	Waddell, Gilzean, Robertson, Hamilton	9,000
18	28 December	Rangers	A	1–2	Penman	43,000
19	1 January	Aberdeen	H	1–4	Gilzean	15,000
20	2 January	Dundee United	A	1–2	Gilzean	21,255
21	4 January	Third Lanark	H	6–0	Gilzean (2), Penman, Waddell, Cousin, Cameron	8,000
22	18 January	East Stirlingshire	A	5–1	Cousin (2), Waddell (2), Gilzean	3,500
23	1 February	Queen of the South	H	6–2	Cameron (2), Gilzean (3), Penman	11,000
24	29 April	Motherwell	A	2–2	Cousin, Cameron	7,000
25	19 February	Hibernian	H	3–0	Penman, Cameron (2)	10,591
26	22 February	Dunfermline Athletic	H	2–1	Cousin, Penman	9,000
27	29 February	St Mirren	H	9–2	Gilzean (3), Waddell (2), Cousin, Cameron (2), Penman	13,000
28	18 March	Airdrieonians	A	1–3	Stuart	802
29	21 March	Heart of Midlothian	H	2–4	Waddell, Cameron	11,593
30	1 April	Celtic	A	1–2	Gilzean	16,309
31	4 April	Kilmarnock	H	2–1	Cameron, Gilzean	13,000
32	13 April	St Johnstone	H	2–1	Stuart, Robertson	13,000
33	18 April	Partick Thistle	H	5–2	Stuart (2), Penman, Gilzean (2)	12,000
34	29 April	Falkirk	A	2–0	Penman (2)	3,000

=== League table ===
Pos	Team	Pld	W	D	L	GF	GA	GR	Pts
4	Hearts	34	19	9	6	74	40	1.850	47
5	Dunfermline	34	18	9	7	64	33	1.939	45
6	Dundee	34	20	5	9	94	50	1.880	45
7	Partick Thistle	34	15	5	14	55	54	1.019	35
8	Dundee United	34	13	8	13	65	49	1.327	34

Source: RSSSF

== Scottish League Cup ==
Statistics provided by Dee Archive.

=== Group 3 ===
Match day	Date	Opponent	H/A	Score	Dundee scorer(s)	Attendance
1	10 August	Third Lanark	A	2–1	Cousin, Gilzean	5,000
2	14 August	Airdrieonians	H	2–1	Penman, Houston	15,000
3	17 August	Dunfermline Athletic	H	4–1	Penman (2) (pen.), Gilzean, Robertson	16,500
4	24 August	Third Lanark	H	3–2	Gilzean (3)	14,500
5	28 August	Airdrieonians	A	1–4	Penman	7,000
6	31 August	Dunfermline Athletic	A	4–3	Gilzean (2), Cameron (2)	13,000

==== Group 3 table ====
Team	Pld	W	D	L	GF	GA	GR	Pts
Dundee	6	5	0	1	16	12	1.333	10
Dunfermline Athletic	6	3	0	3	13	13	1.000	6
Third Lanark	6	3	0	3	11	13	0.846	6
Airdrieonians	6	1	0	5	10	12	0.833	2

=== Knockout stage ===
Match day	Date	Opponent	H/A	Score	Dundee scorer(s)	Attendance
Quarter-finals, 1st leg	11 September	Hibernian	H	3–3	Gilzean, Penman, Waddell	23,225
Quarter-finals, 2nd leg	18 September	Hibernian	A	0–2		24,375
Hibernian won 5–3 on aggregate

== Scottish Cup ==
Statistics provided by Dee Archive.

Match day	Date	Opponent	H/A	Score	Dundee scorer(s)	Attendance
1st round	11 January	Forres Mechanics	A	6–3	Waddell, Gilzean, Penman (pen.), Stuart, Cousin, Cameron	5,681
2nd round	25 January	Brechin City	A	9–2	Penman (2) (pen.), Waddell, Cousin (2), Gilzean (3), Cameron	8,022
3rd round	15 February	Forfar Athletic	H	6–1	Waddell (2), Gilzean (2), Cousin, Cameron	17,574
Quarter-finals	7 March	Motherwell	H	1–1	Cameron	30,443
QF replay	11 March	Motherwell	A	4–2	Cameron (2), Gilzean, Waddell	26,280
Semi-finals	28 March	Kilmarnock	N	4–0	Gilzean (2), Penman, McFadzean (o.g.)	32,664
Final	25 April	Rangers	N	1–3	Cameron	120,982

== Summer Cup ==
Statistics provided by Dee Archive.

=== Group 2 ===
Match day	Date	Opponent	H/A	Score	Dundee scorer(s)	Attendance
1	1 May	Dundee United	A	0–0		13,500
2	6 May	Aberdeen	H	1–0	Cousin	5,000
3	9 May	St Johnstone	A	2–2	Penman, Cameron	7,000
4	13 May	Dundee United	H	3–3	Penman (2x pen.), Cameron	16,000
5	16 May	Aberdeen	A	1–3	Gilzean	9,000
6	20 May	St Johnstone	H	5–1	Penman (2), Gilzean, Tinney, Cousin	6,000

==== Group table ====
Pos	Team	Pld	W	D	L	GF	GA	GD	Pts
1	Aberdeen	6	4	0	2	14	8	+6	8
2	Dundee United	6	3	2	1	9	9	0	8
3	Dundee	6	2	3	1	12	9	+3	7
4	St Johnstone	6	0	1	5	5	14	−9	1

== Player statistics ==
Statistics provided by Dee Archive

No.	Pos	Nat	Player	Total		Division One		Scottish Cup		League Cup		Summer Cup	
No.	Pos	Nat	Player	Apps	Goals	Apps	Goals	Apps	Goals	Apps	Goals	Apps	Goals
	MF	(Scotland) SCO	Craig Brown	2	0	1	0	0	0	1	0	0	0
	FW	(Scotland) SCO	Kenny Cameron	28	22	15	11	7	7	1	2	5	2
	FW	(Scotland) SCO	Alan Cousin	53	15	32	8	7	4	8	1	6	2
	DF	(Scotland) SCO	Bobby Cox	52	1	32	1	7	0	7	0	6	0
	GK	(Scotland) SCO	Ally Donaldson	1	0	0	0	0	0	0	0	1	0
	FW	(Scotland) SCO	Alan Gilzean	48	52	30	33	7	9	7	8	4	2
	DF	(Scotland) SCO	Alex Hamilton	51	1	32	1	7	0	8	0	4	0
	MF	(Scotland) SCO	Doug Houston	15	1	8	0	0	0	7	1	0	0
	FW	(Scotland) SCO	Alex Kinninmonth	1	0	0	0	0	0	0	0	1	0
	FW	(Scotland) SCO	Steve Murray	5	0	2	0	0	0	0	0	3	0
	MF	(Scotland) SCO	Andy Penman	50	30	29	16	7	4	8	5	6	5
	DF	(Scotland) SCO	Hugh Reid	6	0	3	0	0	0	0	0	3	0
	FW	(Scotland) SCO	Hugh Robertson	30	3	21	2	2	0	7	1	0	0
	MF	(Scotland) SCO	George Ryden	51	0	31	0	7	0	8	0	5	0
	MF	(Scotland) SCO	Bobby Seith	52	1	32	1	7	0	7	0	6	0
	GK	(Scotland) SCO	Bert Slater	54	0	34	0	7	0	8	0	5	0
	FW	(Scotland) SCO	Gordon Smith	12	0	9	0	0	0	3	0	0	0
	DF	(Scotland) SCO	Alex Stuart	50	6	32	5	7	1	5	0	6	0
	MF	(Scotland) SCO	Phillip Tinney	1	1	0	0	0	0	0	0	1	1
	FW	(Scotland) SCO	Bobby Waddell	39	20	28	14	5	5	2	1	4	0
	FW	(Scotland) SCO	Bobby Wishart	4	0	3	0	0	0	1	0	0	0

== See also ==
- List of Dundee F.C. seasons
