= 1960–61 Dundee F.C. season =

Dundee
1960–61 season
- Manager: Bob Shankly
- Division One: 10th
- Scottish Cup: 2nd round
- League Cup: Quarter-finals
- Top goalscorer: League: Alan Gilzean (19); All: Alan Gilzean (32)
Home colours

The 1960–61 season was the fifty-ninth season in which Dundee competed at a Scottish national level, playing in Division One, where the club would finish in 10th place. Dundee would also compete in both the Scottish Cup and the Scottish League Cup. They would be knocked out of both the League Cup and Scottish Cup by Rangers.

== Scottish Division One ==
Statistics provided by Dee Archive.

Match day	Date	Opponent	H/A	Score	Dundee scorer(s)	Attendance
1	24 August	Raith Rovers	A	1–2	Cousin	7,000
2	10 September	Aberdeen	H	3–3	Gilzean (3)	12,000
3	17 September	Dundee United	A	1–3	Penman	20,000
4	24 September	Clyde	H	4–1	Cousin, Gilzean, Robertson, Seith	13,700
5	1 October	St Johnstone	H	2–1	Waddell, Robertson	12,000
6	8 October	Rangers	A	1–0	Cousin	22,160
7	15 October	Kilmarnock	H	1–0	Penman (pen.)	16,000
8	22 October	St Mirren	A	2–1	Waddell, Cousin	10,000
9	29 October	Dunfermline Athletic	A	2–4	Cousin, Gilzean	9,000
10	5 November	Hibernian	H	0–1		13,000
11	12 November	Third Lanark	H	0–2		10,000
12	19 November	Ayr United	A	4–2	Gilzean (3), Cousin	6,000
13	26 November	Partick Thistle	H	1–2	Cowie (pen.)	10,000
14	10 December	Airdrieonians	H	2–1	Cousin, Robertson	8,000
15	17 December	Motherwell	A	0–2		11,000
16	24 December	Heart of Midlothian	H	2–2	Gilzean (2)	13,000
17	26 December	Celtic	A	1–2	Robertson	11,000
18	31 December	Raith Rovers	H	2–3	Henderson, Cousin	8,000
19	2 January	Aberdeen	A	1–2	Gilzean	23,000
20	7 January	Dundee United	H	3–0	Wishart (2), Adamson	22,000
21	14 January	Clyde	A	0–0		7,000
22	21 January	St Johnstone	A	1–1	Gilzean	10,000
23	8 February	Rangers	H	4–2	Wishart, Cousin, Gilzean (2)	8,706
24	18 February	Kilmarnock	A	1–2	Gilzean	10,000
25	4 March	Dunfermline Athletic	H	4–1	Seith, Cowie, Gilzean, Cox (pen.)	11,000
26	8 March	St Mirren	H	2–0	Robertson, Cousin	12,000
27	18 March	Third Lanark	A	1–2	Cousin	7,000
28	20 March	Hibernian	A	0–1		8,000
29	25 March	Ayr United	H	6–1	H. Robertson (2), Crichton, Gilzean (2), Cousin	8,000
30	1 April	Partick Thistle	A	2–2	Penman, Robertson	7,000
31	8 April	Celtic	H	0–1		17,500
32	12 April	Airdrieonians	A	4–2	Waddell, Robertson, Penman, Gilzean	3,500
33	22 April	Motherwell	H	2–2	Waddell, Robertson	10,000
34	29 April	Heart of Midlothian	A	1–2	Wishart	10,000

=== League table ===
Pos	Team	Pld	W	D	L	GF	GA	GR	Pts	Qualification or relegation
8	Hibernian	34	15	4	15	66	69	0.957	34	Invited for the Inter-Cities Fairs Cup
9	Dundee United	34	13	7	14	60	58	1.034	33	
10	Dundee	34	13	6	15	61	53	1.151	32	
11	Partick Thistle	34	13	6	15	59	69	0.855	32	
12	Dunfermline Athletic	34	12	7	15	65	81	0.802	31	Qualified for the Cup Winners' Cup

Source: RSSSF

== Scottish League Cup ==
Statistics provided by Dee Archive.

=== Group 4 ===
Match day	Date	Opponent	H/A	Score	Dundee scorer(s)	Attendance
1	13 August	Raith Rovers	H	5–0	Penman, Gilzean (3), Robertson	16,000
2	17 August	Ayr United	A	2–1	Gilzean, Cousin	9,000
3	20 August	Aberdeen	A	4–1	Gilzean (2), Cousin, Penman	18,000
4	27 August	Raith Rovers	A	3–0	Gilzean (3)	8,000
5	31 August	Ayr United	H	3–0	Waddell, Gilzean, Robertson	10,500
6	3 September	Aberdeen	H	6–0	Gilzean (3), McGeachie (2), Waddell	14,500

==== Group 4 table ====
Team	Pld	W	D	L	GF	GA	GR	Pts
Dundee	6	6	0	0	23	2	11.500	12
Aberdeen	6	2	1	3	10	18	0.556	5
Raith Rovers	6	2	1	3	7	14	0.500	5
Ayr United	6	0	2	4	7	13	0.538	2

=== Knockout stage ===
Match day	Date	Opponent	H/A	Score	Dundee scorer(s)	Attendance
Quarter-finals, 1st leg	14 September	Rangers	A	0–1		45,000
Quarter-finals, 2nd leg	21 September	Rangers	H	3–4	Cousin (2), Penman (pen.)	33,000
Rangers won 5–3 on aggregate

== Scottish Cup ==
Statistics provided by Dee Archive.

Match day	Date	Opponent	H/A	Score	Dundee scorer(s)	Attendance
2nd round	11 February	Rangers	H	1–5	Cousin	32,000

== Player statistics ==
Statistics provided by Dee Archive

No.	Pos	Nat	Player	Total		Division One		Scottish Cup		League Cup	
No.	Pos	Nat	Player	Apps	Goals	Apps	Goals	Apps	Goals	Apps	Goals
	FW	(Scotland) SCO	Bobby Adamson	8	1	8	1	0	0	0	0
	FW	(Scotland) SCO	Alan Cousin	34	17	29	12	1	1	4	4
	MF	(Scotland) SCO	Doug Cowie	18	2	17	2	0	0	1	0
	DF	(Scotland) SCO	Bobby Cox	38	1	30	1	1	0	7	0
	FW	(Scotland) SCO	Ronnie Crichton	11	1	11	1	0	0	0	0
	FW	(Scotland) SCO	Dave Curlett	2	0	2	0	0	0	0	0
	FW	(Scotland) SCO	Alan Gilzean	42	32	33	19	1	0	8	13
	DF	(Scotland) SCO	Alex Hamilton	37	0	28	0	1	0	8	0
	FW	(Scotland) SCO	Albert Henderson	11	2	11	2	0	0	0	0
	GK	(Scotland) SCO	John Horsburgh	4	0	4	0	0	0	0	0
	DF	(Scotland) SCO	Fred Jardine	3	0	3	0	0	0	0	0
	GK	(Scotland) SCO	Pat Liney	39	0	30	0	1	0	8	0
	FW	(Scotland) SCO	George McGeachie	17	2	10	0	0	0	7	2
	MF	(Scotland) SCO	Andy Penman	25	7	16	4	1	0	8	3
	DF	(Scotland) SCO	Hugh Reid	11	0	10	0	0	0	1	0
	FW	(Scotland) SCO	Hugh Robertson	43	11	34	9	1	0	8	2
	MF	(Scotland) SCO	Bobby Seith	41	2	33	2	0	0	8	0
	FW	(Scotland) SCO	Billy Smith	16	0	7	0	1	0	8	0
	DF	(Scotland) SCO	Alex Stuart	4	0	3	0	1	0	0	0
	MF	(Scotland) SCO	Ian Ure	41	0	32	0	1	0	8	0
	FW	(Scotland) SCO	Bobby Waddell	12	6	8	4	0	0	4	2
	FW	(Scotland) SCO	Bobby Wishart	16	4	15	4	1	0	0	0

== See also ==
- List of Dundee F.C. seasons
