= 1959–60 Dundee F.C. season =

Dundee
1959–60 season
- Manager: Willie Thornton (until September 1959); Bob Shankly (from September 1959)
- Division One: 4th
- Scottish Cup: 2nd round
- League Cup: Group Stage
- Top goalscorer: League: Hugh Robertson & Alan Cousin (13); All: Alan Cousin (17)
Home colours

The 1959–60 season was the fifty-eighth season in which Dundee competed at a Scottish national level, playing in Division One, where the club would finish in 4th place for the second straight season. Dundee would also compete in both the Scottish Cup and the Scottish League Cup. They would be knocked out in the group stage of the League Cup, and would be eliminated by Hibernian in the Scottish Cup. After the resignation of manager Willie Thornton early in the season, Bob Shankly would take over the club.

== Scottish Division One ==
Statistics provided by Dee Archive.

Match day	Date	Opponent	H/A	Score	Dundee scorer(s)	Attendance
1	19 August	Heart of Midlothian	H	1–3	Cousin	18,500
2	5 September	Aberdeen	A	3–0	Cousin, Waddell, Hill	12,000
3	12 September	Raith Rovers	H	0–2		11,000
4	19 September	Clyde	A	1–1	Henderson	10,000
5	26 September	Motherwell	H	1–1	H. Robertson	14,000
6	3 October	Kilmarnock	A	2–2	McGeachie, H. Robertson	9,000
7	10 October	Rangers	H	1–3	H. Robertson	22,000
8	17 October	Ayr United	H	3–1	Bonthrone, Curlett, Cousin	9,000
9	24 October	St Mirren	A	3–2	Bonthrone, H. Robertson, Curlett	12,000
10	31 October	Arbroath	H	5–0	Logie (o.g.), Bonthrone (2), Cousin, Cowie	12,000
11	7 November	Dunfermline Athletic	H	3–2	Bonthrone, Curlett, H. Robertson	11,000
12	14 November	Partick Thistle	A	5–0	Curlett (2), Bonthrone, Cousin (2)	8,000
13	21 November	Hibernian	A	2–4	Cousin (2)	16,000
14	28 November	Airdrieonians	H	1–2	McGeachie	10,000
15	5 December	Celtic	A	3–2	Bonthrone, H. Robertson, Henderson	12,000
16	12 December	Stirling Albion	A	1–0	Cousin	5,000
17	19 December	Third Lanark	H	2–1	Henderson, Cowie	9,000
18	26 December	Heart of Midlothian	A	0–3		16,000
19	1 January	Aberdeen	H	4–1	Henderson (2), H. Robertson, Penman	15,500
20	2 January	Raith Rovers	A	1–1	Bonthrone	11,000
21	9 January	Clyde	H	2–0	Penman, H. Robertson	11,000
22	16 January	Motherwell	A	0–0		10,000
23	23 January	Kilmarnock	H	0–4		15,000
24	9 February	Rangers	A	0–0		22,000
25	27 February	St Mirren	H	3–1	McGeachie, Gilzean, Cousin	11,000
26	5 March	Arbroath	A	1–1	Cowie	5,200
27	10 March	Ayr United	A	0–1		4,500
28	12 March	Dunfermline Athletic	A	2–2	Cousin, Waddell	7,000
29	19 March	Partick Thistle	H	3–0	H. Robertson (2), Cousin	7,500
30	26 March	Hibernian	H	6–3	Gilzean, Penman (3), McGeachie, H. Robertson	8,000
31	2 April	Airdrieonians	A	3–3	Gilzean, H. Robertson, Cowie	4,500
32	16 April	Celtic	H	2–0	Gilzean, H. Robertson	16,000
33	23 April	Stirling Albion	H	4–1	Gilzean (3), McGeachie	7,000
34	30 April	Third Lanark	A	2–2	Gilzean, Cousin	5,000

=== League table ===
Pos	Team	Pld	W	D	L	GF	GA	GR	Pts	Qualification or relegation
2	Kilmarnock	34	24	2	8	67	45	1.489	50	
3	Rangers	34	17	8	9	72	38	1.895	42	Qualified for the Cup Winners' Cup
4	Dundee	34	16	10	8	70	49	1.429	42	
5	Motherwell	34	16	8	10	71	61	1.164	40	
6	Clyde	34	15	9	10	77	69	1.116	39	

Source: RSSSF

== Scottish League Cup ==
Statistics provided by Dee Archive.

=== Group 4 ===
Match day	Date	Opponent	H/A	Score	Dundee scorer(s)	Attendance
1	8 August	Motherwell	A	2–4	Cousin, Bonthrone	15,500
2	12 August	Hibernian	H	4–3	Cowie, Cousin (2), H. Robertson	17,000
3	15 August	Rangers	A	0–2		37,000
4	22 August	Motherwell	H	1–4	Hill	18,000
5	26 August	Hibernian	A	3–1	H. Robertson (2), McGeachie	17,000
6	29 August	Rangers	H	2–3	Waddell, Cousin	20,000

==== Group 4 table ====
Team	Pld	W	D	L	GF	GA	GR	Pts
Motherwell	6	6	0	0	19	8	2.375	12
Rangers	6	4	0	2	18	8	2.250	8
Dundee	6	2	0	4	12	17	0.706	4
Hibernian	6	0	0	6	9	25	0.360	0

== Scottish Cup ==
Statistics provided by Dee Archive.

Match day	Date	Opponent	H/A	Score	Dundee scorer(s)	Attendance
2nd round	29 February	Hibernian	A	0–3		30,419

== Player statistics ==
Statistics provided by Dee Archive

No.	Pos	Nat	Player	Total		Division One		Scottish Cup		League Cup	
No.	Pos	Nat	Player	Apps	Goals	Apps	Goals	Apps	Goals	Apps	Goals
	FW	(Scotland) SCO	Jimmy Bonthrone	13	9	10	8	0	0	3	1
	FW	(Scotland) SCO	Alan Cousin	41	17	34	13	1	0	6	4
	MF	(Scotland) SCO	Doug Cowie	34	5	29	4	1	0	4	1
	DF	(Scotland) SCO	Bobby Cox	41	0	34	0	1	0	6	0
	FW	(Scotland) SCO	Dave Curlett	22	5	18	5	0	0	4	0
	MF	(Scotland) SCO	Jimmy Gabriel	27	0	21	0	1	0	5	0
	FW	(Scotland) SCO	Alan Gilzean	10	8	8	8	1	0	1	0
	DF	(Scotland) SCO	Alex Hamilton	41	0	34	0	1	0	6	0
	FW	(Scotland) SCO	Albert Henderson	24	5	18	5	0	0	6	0
	FW	(Scotland) SCO	Ally Hill	10	2	7	1	0	0	3	1
	GK	(Scotland) SCO	John Horsburgh	5	0	1	0	0	0	4	0
	DF	(Scotland) SCO	Fred Jardine	2	0	2	0	0	0	0	0
	GK	(Scotland) SCO	Pat Liney	36	0	33	0	1	0	2	0
	FW	(Scotland) SCO	George McGeachie	36	6	30	5	1	0	5	1
	MF	(Scotland) SCO	Billy McMillan	8	0	6	0	0	0	2	0
	MF	(Scotland) SCO	Andy Penman	22	5	20	5	1	0	1	0
	FW	(Scotland) SCO	Hugh Robertson	39	16	32	13	1	0	6	3
	FW	(Scotland) SCO	Tommy Robertson	2	0	1	0	0	0	1	0
	FW	(Scotland) SCO	Billy Smith	27	0	26	0	1	0	0	0
	MF	(Scotland) SCO	Ian Ure	7	0	7	0	0	0	0	0
	FW	(Scotland) SCO	Bobby Waddell	4	3	3	2	0	0	1	1

== See also ==
- List of Dundee F.C. seasons
