= 1958–59 Dundee F.C. season =

Dundee
1958–59 season
- Manager: Willie Thornton
- Division One: 4th
- Scottish Cup: 1st round
- League Cup: Group Stage
- Top goalscorer: League: Alan Cousin (17); All: Alan Cousin (18)
Home colours

The 1958–59 season was the fifty-seventh season in which Dundee competed at a Scottish national level, playing in Division One, where the club would finish in 4th place, their highest since the 1950–51 season. Dundee would also compete in both the Scottish Cup and the Scottish League Cup. They would be knocked out in the group stage of the League Cup, and would be eliminated by Highland League side Fraserburgh in one of the biggest upsets in Scottish Cup history.

== Scottish Division One ==
Statistics provided by Dee Archive.

Match day	Date	Opponent	H/A	Score	Dundee scorer(s)	Attendance
1	20 August	Falkirk	A	5–2	Cousin (3), Hill, Curlett	13,000
2	6 September	Aberdeen	H	2–1	H. Robertson, McGeachie	12,000
3	13 September	Raith Rovers	A	1–4	Hill	10,000
4	20 September	Kilmarnock	H	1–0	Sneddon	12,000
5	27 September	Rangers	A	2–1	Telfer (o.g.), Hill	32,000
6	4 October	Motherwell	H	1–1	H. Robertson	10,000
7	11 October	Heart of Midlothian	H	3–3	Cousin (2), Cowie	18,000
8	18 October	Clyde	A	2–3	Curlett, H. Robertson	11,000
9	25 October	St Mirren	A	2–2	Crossan (2)	8,000
10	1 November	Celtic	H	1–1	McNeill (o.g.)	22,500
11	8 November	Stirling Albion	H	3–0	Curlett, Cousin, H. Robertson	12,500
12	15 November	Queen of the South	A	3–1	Cousin (2), H. Robertson	5,500
13	22 November	Third Lanark	H	3–0	Henderson, Curlett (2)	10,500
14	29 November	Partick Thistle	A	0–3		9,000
15	6 December	Hibernian	H	2–1	H. Robertson, Cousin	13,000
16	13 December	Dunfermline Athletic	A	1–2	Sneddon	8,000
17	20 December	Airdrieonians	H	1–1	H. Robertson	10,000
18	27 December	Falkirk	H	3–2	Sneddon (3)	8,000
19	1 January	Aberdeen	A	1–1	Curlett	12,000
20	3 January	Raith Rovers	H	2–0	Curlett, Bonthrone	14,000
21	10 January	Kilmarnock	A	0–1		7,000
22	24 January	Motherwell	A	0–2		11,000
23	28 January	Rangers	H	1–3	Sneddon	16,000
24	7 February	Heart of Midlothian	A	0–1		18,000
25	21 February	St Mirren	H	4–6	Bonthrone (2), Cowie, Henderson	6,500
26	28 February	Clyde	H	2–1	Cousin (2)	7,000
27	4 March	Celtic	A	1–1	Bonthrone	7,500
28	7 March	Stirling Albion	A	1–0	Cousin	5,500
29	14 March	Queen of the South	H	2–1	Cousin (2)	5,000
30	21 March	Third Lanark	A	3–0	Cousin (2), McGeachie	6,000
31	28 March	Partick Thistle	H	3–2	H. Robertson, McGeachie, Cousin	8,000
32	4 April	Hibernian	A	2–1	Grant (o.g.), T. Robertson	10,000
33	13 April	Dunfermline Athletic	H	2–2	H. Robertson, Sweeney (o.g.)	5,000
34	18 April	Airdrieonians	A	1–1	T. Robertson	5,000

=== League table ===
Pos	Team	Pld	W	D	L	GF	GA	GR	Pts
2	Heart of Midlothian	34	21	6	7	92	51	1.804	48
3	Motherwell	34	18	8	8	83	50	1.660	44
4	Dundee	34	16	9	9	61	51	1.196	41
5	Airdrieonians	34	15	7	12	64	62	1.032	37
6	Celtic	34	14	8	12	70	53	1.321	36

Source: RSSSF

== Scottish League Cup ==
Statistics provided by Dee Archive.

=== Group 3 ===
Match day	Date	Opponent	H/A	Score	Dundee scorer(s)	Attendance
1	9 August	Partick Thistle	H	2–3	Cowie, Sneddon	11,000
2	13 August	Motherwell	A	2–1	H. Robertson, Bonthrone	12,000
3	16 August	Queen of the South	A	0–1		6,500
4	23 August	Partick Thistle	A	2–3	Cousin, Hill	12,000
5	27 August	Motherwell	H	2–3	Hill (2)	8,000
6	30 August	Queen of the South	H	2–0	Cowie, Hill	8,000

==== Group 3 table ====
Team	Pld	W	D	L	GF	GA	GR	Pts
Partick Thistle	6	4	1	1	17	11	1.545	9
Motherwell	6	3	1	2	13	11	1.182	7
Dundee	6	2	0	4	10	11	0.909	4
Queen of the South	6	2	0	4	6	13	0.462	4

== Scottish Cup ==
Statistics provided by Dee Archive.

Match day	Date	Opponent	H/A	Score	Dundee scorer(s)	Attendance
1st round	31 January	Fraserburgh	A	0–1		4,500

== Player statistics ==
Statistics provided by Dee Archive

No.	Pos	Nat	Player	Total		Division One		Scottish Cup		League Cup	
No.	Pos	Nat	Player	Apps	Goals	Apps	Goals	Apps	Goals	Apps	Goals
	FW	(Scotland) SCO	Jimmy Bonthrone	17	5	13	4	1	0	3	1
	GK	(Scotland) SCO	Bill Brown	37	0	30	0	1	0	6	0
	FW	(Scotland) SCO	Alan Cousin	39	18	32	17	1	0	6	1
	MF	(Scotland) SCO	Doug Cowie	34	4	27	2	1	0	6	2
	DF	(Scotland) SCO	Bobby Cox	41	0	34	0	1	0	6	0
	FW	(Scotland) SCO	Frank Crossan	2	2	2	2	0	0	0	0
	FW	(Scotland) SCO	Dave Curlett	25	7	21	7	1	0	3	0
	FW	(Scotland) SCO	Hugh Drennan	1	0	1	0	0	0	0	0
	MF	(Scotland) SCO	Jimmy Gabriel	40	0	34	0	1	0	5	0
	DF	(Scotland) SCO	Alex Hamilton	22	0	15	0	1	0	6	0
	FW	(Scotland) SCO	Albert Henderson	37	2	30	2	1	0	6	0
	FW	(Scotland) SCO	Ally Hill	19	7	16	3	0	0	3	4
	DF	(Scotland) SCO	Fred Jardine	1	0	1	0	0	0	0	0
	GK	(Scotland) SCO	Pat Liney	2	0	2	0	0	0	0	0
	FW	(Scotland) SCO	George McGeachie	27	3	23	3	0	0	4	0
	MF	(Scotland) SCO	Ralph McKenzie	1	0	0	0	0	0	1	0
	MF	(Scotland) SCO	Andy Penman	2	0	2	0	0	0	0	0
	DF	(Scotland) SCO	Hugh Reid	19	0	19	0	0	0	0	0
	FW	(Scotland) SCO	Hugh Robertson	25	4	23	3	2	1	0	0
	FW	(Scotland) SCO	Tommy Robertson	4	2	4	2	0	0	0	0
	FW	(Scotland) SCO	Davie Sneddon	39	7	32	6	1	0	6	1
	MF	(Scotland) SCO	Ian Ure	2	0	2	0	0	0	0	0
	GK	(Scotland) SCO	Mike Watson	2	0	2	0	0	0	0	0

== See also ==
- List of Dundee F.C. seasons
