= 1957–58 Dundee F.C. season =

Dundee
1957–58 season
- Manager: Willie Thornton
- Division One: 11th
- Scottish Cup: 3rd round
- League Cup: Group Stage
- Top goalscorer: League: Alan Cousin (15); All: Alan Cousin (23)
Home colours

The 1957–58 season was the fifty-sixth season in which Dundee competed at a Scottish national level, playing in Division One, where the club would finish in 11th place. Dundee would also compete in both the Scottish Cup and the Scottish League Cup. They would be knocked out in the group stage of the League Cup, and in the third round of the Scottish Cup by Aberdeen. The club would change their sock colours back to navy, cementing their iconic look for the next decade.

== Scottish Division One ==
Statistics provided by Dee Archive.

Match day	Date	Opponent	H/A	Score	Dundee scorer(s)	Attendance
1	7 September	Heart of Midlothian	A	0–6		19,700
2	14 September	Raith Rovers	H	0–2		13,000
3	21 September	Aberdeen	A	0–3		10,000
4	5 October	Clyde	A	1–3	Christie	7,000
5	12 October	Motherwell	H	3–0	O'Hara, A. Henderson (2)	10,000
6	19 October	Hibernian	H	3–0	Sneddon, Christie, Black	16,000
7	26 October	East Fife	A	1–3	Chalmers	6,000
8	2 November	Queen of the South	H	2–1	A. Henderson, Cousin	9,000
9	9 November	Third Lanark	A	1–5	O'Hara	8,000
10	16 November	Partick Thistle	H	5–0	Cousin, O'Hara (3), Robertson	9,000
11	23 November	St Mirren	A	1–1	Cousin	10,000
12	30 November	Queen's Park	H	1–0	Cowie	7,500
13	7 December	Celtic	A	0–0		12,000
14	14 December	Rangers	H	1–2	Cousin	21,000
15	21 December	Falkirk	H	2–4	Cousin, Robertson	7,000
16	26 December	Kilmarnock	H	2–0	Cousin, McGrory	9,000
17	28 December	Airdrieonians	A	1–7	Black	6,000
18	1 January	Aberdeen	H	1–2	Sneddon	18,000
19	2 January	Raith Rovers	A	0–4		10,000
20	4 January	Heart of Midlothian	H	0–5		23,000
21	11 January	Kilmarnock	A	1–1	Cousin	11,000
22	18 January	Clyde	H	2–0	Chalmers, Cousin	15,000
23	22 February	Queen of the South	A	0–4		7,000
24	5 March	Third Lanark	H	2–0	Robertson, Sneddon	4,000
25	8 March	Partick Thistle	A	0–2		10,000
26	15 March	St Mirren	H	0–0		10,000
27	22 March	Queen's Park	A	7–2	Sneddon (2), Cousin (3), Christie, Bonthrone	4,000
28	29 March	Celtic	H	5–3	Sneddon, Bonthrone, Cousin, Curlett (2)	20,000
29	12 April	Falkirk	A	2–0	Cousin (2)	7,000
30	16 April	Hibernian	A	1–1	Bonthrone	12,000
31	26 April	Airdrieonians	H	1–3	Curlett	6,500
32	28 April	Motherwell	A	0–1		5,000
33	30 April	East Fife	H	2–0	Cowie, Curlett	5,000
34	10 May	Rangers	A	1–0	Cousin	11,000

=== League table ===
Pos	Team	Pld	W	D	L	GF	GA	GR	Pts
9	Hibernian	34	13	5	16	59	60	0.983	31
10	Falkirk	34	11	9	14	64	82	0.780	31
11	Dundee	34	13	5	16	49	65	0.754	31
12	Aberdeen	34	14	2	18	68	76	0.895	30
13	St Mirren	34	11	8	15	59	66	0.894	30

Source: RSSSF

== Scottish League Cup ==
Statistics provided by Dee Archive.

=== Group 4 ===
Match day	Date	Opponent	H/A	Score	Dundee scorer(s)	Attendance
1	10 August	Queen's Park	A	5–2	Easson (2), Cousin (3)	10,000
2	14 August	Kilmarnock	H	0–3		15,000
3	20 August	Heart of Midlothian	H	2–2	Chalmers, Cousin	16,200
4	24 August	Queen's Park	H	1–1	Cousin	10,000
5	28 August	Kilmarnock	A	1–1	Chalmers	13,535
6	31 August	Heart of Midlothian	A	2–4	Cousin (2)	18,000

==== Group 4 table ====
Team	Pld	W	D	L	GF	GA	GR	Pts
Kilmarnock	6	3	3	0	12	6	2.000	9
Heart of Midlothian	6	2	3	1	17	9	1.889	7
Dundee	6	1	3	2	11	13	0.846	5
Queen's Park	6	0	3	3	8	20	0.400	3

== Scottish Cup ==
Statistics provided by Dee Archive.

Match day	Date	Opponent	H/A	Score	Dundee scorer(s)	Attendance
2nd round	15 February	Raith Rovers	A	1–0	Cousin	12,649
3rd round	1 March	Aberdeen	H	1–3	Robertson	24,532

== Player statistics ==
Statistics provided by Dee Archive

No.	Pos	Nat	Player	Total		Division One		Scottish Cup		League Cup	
No.	Pos	Nat	Player	Apps	Goals	Apps	Goals	Apps	Goals	Apps	Goals
	MF	(Scotland) SCO	Dougie Alexander	1	0	1	0	0	0	0	0
	MF	(Scotland) SCO	Gordon Black	24	2	20	2	0	0	4	0
	FW	(Scotland) SCO	Jimmy Bonthrone	7	3	7	3	0	0	0	0
	GK	(Scotland) SCO	Bill Brown	39	0	31	0	2	0	6	0
	FW	(Scotland) SCO	Jimmy Chalmers	17	4	9	2	2	0	6	2
	FW	(Scotland) SCO	George Christie	33	3	26	3	1	0	6	0
	FW	(Scotland) SCO	Alan Cousin	39	23	31	15	2	1	6	7
	MF	(Scotland) SCO	Doug Cowie	39	2	31	2	2	0	6	0
	DF	(Scotland) SCO	Bobby Cox	42	0	34	0	2	0	6	0
	FW	(Scotland) SCO	Dave Curlett	8	4	8	4	0	0	0	0
	FW	(Scotland) SCO	Dave Easson	3	2	1	0	0	0	2	2
	GK	(Scotland) SCO	Jimmy Ferguson	2	0	2	0	0	0	0	0
	MF	(Scotland) SCO	Alec Glen	1	0	1	0	0	0	0	0
	DF	(Scotland) SCO	Alex Hamilton	21	0	18	0	2	0	1	0
	FW	(Scotland) SCO	Albert Henderson	32	3	26	3	2	0	4	0
	GK	(Scotland) SCO	Pat Liney	1	0	1	0	0	0	0	0
	FW	(Scotland) SCO	George McGeachie	8	0	4	0	0	0	4	0
	FW	(Scotland) SCO	Frank McGrory	5	1	5	1	0	0	0	0
	FW	(Scotland) SCO	Arthur McIvor	3	0	3	0	0	0	0	0
	MF	(Scotland) SCO	Ralph McKenzie	33	0	31	0	2	0	0	0
	FW	(Scotland) SCO	Danny McLennan	4	0	0	0	0	0	4	0
	FW	(Scotland) SCO	George O'Hara	19	5	15	5	1	0	3	0
	DF	(Scotland) SCO	Hugh Reid	21	0	16	0	0	0	5	0
	FW	(Scotland) SCO	Felix Reilly	4	0	4	0	0	0	0	0
	FW	(Scotland) SCO	Hugh Robertson	25	4	23	3	2	1	0	0
	FW	(Scotland) SCO	Davie Sneddon	25	6	23	6	2	0	0	0
	MF	(Scotland) SCO	Gordon Tosh	1	0	1	0	0	0	0	0
	FW	(Scotland) SCO	Clive Wallace	1	0	1	0	0	0	0	0
	FW	(Scotland) SCO	Don Watt	1	0	1	0	0	0	0	0

== See also ==
- List of Dundee F.C. seasons
