= Dalry Thistle F.C. =

Association football club in North Ayrshire, Scotland

Dalry Thistle
- Full name: Dalry
- Nickname: Theeso
- Founded: 1920
- Ground: Merksworth Park, Dalry
- Coordinates: 55°42′18″N 4°43′30″W
- Manager: John Dalziel
- League: West of Scotland League Second Division
- 2025–26: West of Scotland League Third Division, 6th of 16 (promoted)
Home colours

Dalry Thistle Football Club are a Scottish football club, based in the town of Dalry, Ayrshire. Formed in 1920, they play at Merksworth Park. Currently playing in the West of Scotland League Second Division, they wear dark blue strips. 2020 was their centenary year.

The team are managed by John Dalziel, who joined the club at the end of October 2026 along with his management team Neil Whitelaw (Assistant Manager), Scott Perry (Goalie Coach), John Hughes and Reece Walsh.

== Notable players ==
- Jim Leighton - 91 international caps for Scotland, second only to Kenny Dalglish. European Cup Winners' Cup winner with Aberdeen. Also played for Manchester United, Dundee and Hibernian.
- Hugh Baird - Airdrie, Leeds United, Aberdeen and Scotland
- Ian Ure - Dundee, Arsenal, Manchester United and Scotland.
- Pat Liney - Scottish Football League winner with Dundee in 1961–62
- Tommy Murray - Scottish Cup winner with Falkirk in 1957.
- Tom Brown - Scottish Cup winner with Kilmarnock in 1997 and Scotland B cap.

== Honours ==
- Ayrshire Third Division winners: 2001–02
- Ayrshire (Ardrossan & Saltcoats Herald) Cup: 1960–61
- Ayrshire League (Kerr & Smith) Cup: 1933–34
- Ayrshire District (Irvine Times) Cup: 1939–40
- Ayrshire District League Champions: 2008–09, 2017–18
