= Andrew Penman =

Andrew Penman may refer to:

- Andy Penman (1943–1994), Scottish footballer
- Andrew Penman, guitarist with the band Salmonella Dub
