= Bobby Cox (footballer) =

Scottish footballer (1934–2010)

Personal information
- Full name: Robert Cox
- Date of birth: 24 January 1934
- Place of birth: Dundee, Scotland
- Date of death: 20 February 2010 (aged 76)
- Place of death: Scotland
- Position: Defender

Youth career
- Dundee Osborne

Senior career*
Years	Team	Apps	(Gls)
1956–1968	Dundee	327	(2)

International career
1961	SFL trial v SFA	1	(0)
- * Club domestic league appearances and goals

Robert Cox (24 January 1934 – 20 February 2010) was a Scottish footballer who played for Dundee from 1955 to 1969 and was their captain when they won their only Scottish league title in 1962.

== Career ==
Dundee manager Willie Thornton signed Cox in 1955 and began what was to be a 14-year playing association with the club that he supported all his life. He made the first of what were to be more than 400 appearances in a 3–1 Dens Park win over Queen's Park, on 20 October 1956 after only four matches for the reserve side. For the remainder of his career only injury and illness would prevent him from wearing the number three shirt. Doug Cowie was one of the mainstays of the team and when Cowie left, Cox succeeded him as captain – would eventually notch up the second highest number of appearances for Dundee and his 433 starts are only bettered by the man whom he succeeded as captain.

The club had waned from the early 1950 days of Billy Steel and company, but at the start of the next decade, as manager Bob Shankly introduced youngsters Alex Hamilton, Ian Ure, Andy Penman, Alan Gilzean, and Hugh Robertson and brought in experience in the shape of Bobby Seith, Bobby Wishart and Gordon Smith, the Dark Blues became genuine contenders for the major prizes.

In 1962 they surpassed anything accomplished by a previous Dundee side, winning the Scottish League title by three points from Rangers – whom they defeated 5–1 at Ibrox en route to the big prize.

Saturday, 28 April 1962 became a date to remember for Dundee fans as Cox led his troops to the League Flag following a 3–0 win over St Johnstone at Muirton Park. At the end of the match, the Dundee support steamed their way onto the pitch to acclaim their triumph and the pictures of the fans lifting their captain onto their shoulders as he held arms up in the air are synonymous with Dundee's greatest day.

The following season, Dundee set off on a memorable European odyssey as Cox led the club into its first foray into continental competition. As they took their European Cup challenge to a semi-final against AC Milan, they showed that the classic Scottish passing game which they played, could work as well in Europe as in Scotland. Their campaign began with an 8–1 thumping of second favourites Cologne, before a bruising rematch in Germany. Sporting Lisbon and Anderlecht were also despatched before, significantly, with Cox injured and unable to play, AC Milan ended the dream in the San Siro.

That team then began to break up, but in 1964, whilst owner of the aptly named public house, 'The Sliding Tackle' in Broughty Ferry (he was renowned for his trademark sliding tackle with the outside of his right foot), he once again captained the team to another memorable occasion as Dundee played Rangers in the Scottish Cup Final. It was Dundee's first appearance in the Final for twelve years but two late goals from Rangers denied the Dark Blues a replay.

Cox was again involved in another classic Cup Final three years later when he was on the bench for the 1967 League Cup Final against Celtic but he was to be again denied a cup winning medal when the newly crowned Lisbon Lions ran out winners by five goals to three. That same season, Dundee reached a European semi for a second time and Cox was part of the squad which faced Leeds United in the Inter-Cities Fairs Cup, the forerunner of the U.E.F.A. Cup. Cox didn't play in either leg against the men from Elland Road but he did play in the first two rounds against Dutch side DWS Amsterdam and Royal Liege from Belgium.

Although an established member and skipper of at one stage the best team in the country, Cox did not receive the full recognition of his country. His only representative honour was for a Scottish League XI against the Scotland national side in a 'trial' international at Parkhead in 1961 but it was a match in which no caps were awarded. He was named as reserve on no fewer than twelve occasions but was repeatedly overlooked for the cap.

When Cox eventually retired in 1969, Dundee were still the top team on Tayside but that was by no means the end of his Dark Blue association. He was always a welcome guest at Dens Park, to which he returned on a more regular basis after chairman Angus Cook brought him back in 1989 as a match day host alongside friend and full back partner Alex Hamilton. It was a role he fulfilled with honour, entertaining a new generation of fans until he died in February 2010.

At 5 ft 7in, Cox was a rugged Dundonian, born and bred a few hundred yards from Dens Park in Wedderburn Street on 24 January 1934, he was described by Shankly's right-hand man, trainer Sammy Kean, as a 'a real tiger, a born winner who never gave up and whose influence was immense.' He continued to be an inspiration to the players who followed in his footsteps and he regularly travelled to away matches on the team's coach. He also accompanied Jim Duffy's squad on their European trips to Shkodër and Perugia in 2003, having led Dundee into their first campaign just over forty years previously. Cox was a one club man, giving the club over fifty years service.

In 1999, fans voted to have one of the new stands at Dens Park named after Cox and he was inducted to the Dundee F.C. Hall of Fame in 2009.

== Personal life ==
The actor Brian Cox is his cousin.
