= 1969–70 Arsenal F.C. season =

English football club season

Arsenal
1969–70 season
- Chairman: Denis Hill-Wood
- Manager: Bertie Mee
- First Division: 12th
- FA Cup: Third round
- League Cup: Third round
- Inter-Cities Fairs Cup: Winners
- Top goalscorer: League: John Radford (12); All: John Radford (19)
- Highest home attendance: 59,498 vs Manchester United (20 September 1969)
- Lowest home attendance: 21,165 vs West Bromwich Albion (7 October 1969)
- Average home league attendance: 35,758
Home colours	Away colours	Third colours

During the 1969–70 English football season, Arsenal F.C. competed in the Football League First Division. Arsenal finished twelfth in the league. However, the team won the Inter-Cities Fairs Cup, their first European trophy and first silverware in 17 years. Arsenal beat Ajax in the semifinals and Anderlecht in the finals to raise the trophy.

Arsenal were knocked out in the third round of both the FA Cup and the League Cup.

John Radford was again the top scorer in both the league and all competitions. Frank McLintock served as captain.

== Season summary ==
Arsenal began the 1969-70 season by altering their socks from white and blue stripes to red with a white band on the top. Along with minor design changes, Arsenal soon saw the departure of defender Ian Ure as he was sold to Manchester United for £80,000. Mee brought in John Roberts as a potential successor. Goalkeeper Geoff Barnett was bought from Everton as well. Bobby Gould was mostly sidelined to the reserves until he was bought by Wolves midway through the season.

The season opener, a 1-0 home defeat to Everton, saw the debut of 18-year-old Charlie George. George saw his first League goal come in the third match at West Brom. 17-year-old Ray Kennedy also began to feature for Arsenal throughout the season.

Arsenal played in the Inter-Cities Fairs Cup, having finished fourth in the League the previous season (and first out of the London teams). By the time the cup started, Arsenal had played just eight league games, scoring six goals and winning two matches. However, Arsenal made it past Glentoran in their first tie of the Fairs Cup; however, in the first round, second leg of that matchup, George was sent off for dissent. In the next round against Sporting Lisbon, Barnett saved a penalty and Arsenal kept a clean sheet to win 3-0.

Arsenal, now that Graham had moved to midfield and George had been sent down to the reserves after his sending-off, struggled to find a regular goalscorer. The defense also took time to adjust to the loss of Ure, with Terry Neill, John Roberts, and Frank McLintock all featuring in the center. Captain McLintock eventually solidified himself at centre-half, having previously played wing-half. The struggling team went ten matches without a win before winning 5-1 over Crystal Palace.

In the winter, 19-year-old Peter Marinello joined Arsenal for £100,000 and scored in his first appearance against Manchester United. It was his only goal in fourteen games. Jimmy Robertson was soon released to Ipswich. Arsenal faced Rouen in the Inter-Cities Fairs Cup and managed to break through with a late goal from Jon Sammels. Arsenal, playing four games in a week, then faced Blackpool in the FA Cup and lost 3-2 after leading by two at half-time, the end of that cup run for the season and the last appearance as a player for Terry Neill. Such failure was compounded by a 3-0 defeat at home to Chelsea, a match which featured Ray Kennedy's full debut. However, all Arsenal's focus were on their European campaign. They beat Dinamo Bacau 2-0 away and then slammed then 7-1 at home, with Eddie Kelly finding his feet.

Arsenal faced European Cup winners Ajax in the semi-finals, a tough matchup against a team which included Johan Cruyff and Rudi Krol among their stars. The first match was at home and featured two goals from George: a long-range shot and a converted penalty. Sammels also contributed a goal, leaving the scoreline at 3-0 to Arsenal. Traveling to Amsterdam, Arsenal restricted Ajax to just one goal, meaning Arsenal were through to the finals.

Arsenal faced Anderlecht in the final, their talented forward Jan Mulder a major threat to Arsenal's defense. After going down 3-0 with Mulder scoring twice against goalkeeper Bob Wilson, Kennedy came on for George and managed to nab one back. McLintock, initially extremely disappointed about the possibility of losing yet another cup final, rallied the dressing room. He believed that Arsenal could exploit Anderlecth's vulnerable defense in the home match at Highbury. In the return match, Arsenal performed admirably and with great energy. Kelly scored a valuable first goal before John Radford found space in the air to head Arsenal's second. Arsenal, ahead on the away-goals rule, had no room to rest as Mulder hit the post. Finally, Sammels added a third goal and Arsenal had won their first European trophy and their first trophy in seventeen years.

The 1970 World Cup meant that the season was compressed to finish in April. Arsenal finished a distant twelfth, having focused on their run in European competition. Manager Bertie Mee had players returning from injury, and players he could trust to take Arsenal to the next level for the upcoming season. Although the Inter-Cities Fairs Cup was an achievement, it was soon to be overshadowed by the Double which was still to come.

== Final league table ==
Pos	Team	Pld	W	D	L	GF	GA	GAv	Pts	Qualification or relegation
10	Manchester City	42	16	11	15	55	48	1.146	43	Qualification for the European Cup Winners' Cup first round (Note: Manchester City qualified for the European Cup Winners' Cup as the 1969-70 European Cup Winners' Cup winners.)
11	Tottenham Hotspur	42	17	9	16	54	55	0.982	43	
12	Arsenal	42	12	18	12	51	49	1.041	42	Qualification for the Inter-Cities Fairs Cup first round
13	Wolverhampton Wanderers	42	12	16	14	55	57	0.965	40	
14	Burnley	42	12	15	15	56	61	0.918	39	

Source: World Football
Rules for classification: 1) Points; 2) Goal average; 3) Goals scored

== Results ==
Arsenal's score comes first

=== Legend ===
Win	Draw	Loss

=== Football League First Division ===
Date	Opponent	Venue	Result	Attendance	Scorers
9 August 1969	Everton	H	0–1	44,364	
13 August 1969	Leeds United	A	0–0	37,164	
16 August 1969	West Bromwich Albion	A	1–0	32,215	George
19 August 1969	Leeds United	H	1–1	44,923	Rice
23 August 1969	Nottingham Forest	H	2–1	30,290	Graham, McNab
25 August 1969	West Ham United	A	1–1	39,590	(o.g.)
30 August 1969	Newcastle United	A	1–3	47,208	Robertson
6 September 1969	Sheffield Wednesday	H	0–0	28,605	
13 September 1969	Burnley	A	1–0	14,721	Graham
16 September 1969	Tottenham Hotspur	H	2–3	55,280	Radford, Robertson
20 September 1969	Manchester United	H	2–2	59,498	Graham, Sammels
27 September 1969	Chelsea	A	0–3	46,370	
4 October 1969	Coventry City	H	0–1	28,977	
7 October 1969	West Bromwich Albion	H	1–1	21,165	Radford
11 October 1969	Stoke City	A	0–0	25,801	
18 October 1969	Sunderland	A	1–1	17,864	Sammels
25 October 1969	Ipswich Town	H	0–0	22,458	
1 November 1969	Crystal Palace	A	5–1	34,894	Radford (3), Armstrong, Graham
8 November 1969	Derby County	H	4–0	49,763	Armstrong, Sammels (2), George
15 November 1969	Wolverhampton Wanderers	A	0–2	26,796	
22 November 1969	Manchester City	H	1–1	42,923	Neill (pen.)
29 November 1969	Liverpool	A	1–0	40,295	Robertson
6 December 1969	Southampton	H	2–2	24,509	Radford, Sammels
13 December 1969	Burnley	H	3–2	21,404	Armstrong, Radford, Robertson
20 December 1969	Sheffield Wednesday	A	1–1	17,101	Sammels
26 December 1969	Nottingham Forest	A	1–1	38,915	McNab
27 December 1969	Newcastle United	H	0–0	39,646	
10 January 1970	Manchester United	A	1–2	41,055	Marinello
17 January 1970	Chelsea	H	0–3	51,338	
31 January 1970	Coventry City	A	0–2	31,661	
7 February 1970	Stoke City	H	0–0	26,363	
14 February 1970	Everton	A	2–2	48,564	George, Radford
18 February 1970	Manchester City	A	1–1	25,508	Graham
21 February 1970	Derby County	A	2–3	32,584	Radford, Roberts
28 February 1970	Sunderland	H	3–1	21,826	Kennedy, Storey (pen.), Kelly
14 March 1970	Liverpool	H	2–1	32,333	Radford, Sammels
21 March 1970	Southampton	A	2–0	23,902	George, Sammels
28 March 1970	Wolverhampton Wanderers	H	2–2	32,353	Graham (2)
30 March 1970	Crystal Palace	H	2–0	34,144	George, Radford
31 March 1970	Ipswich Town	A	1–2	25,713	George
4 April 1970	West Ham United	H	2–1	36,218	Radford, Kelly
2 May 1970	Tottenham Hotspur	A	0–1	46,969	

=== FA Cup ===
Round	Date	Opponent	Venue	Result	Attendance	Scorers
R3	3 January 1970	Blackpool	H	1–1	32,210	Radford
R3 R	15 January 1970	Blackpool	A	2–3	24,801	Radford, Sammels

=== League Cup ===
Round	Date	Opponent	Venue	Result	Attendance	Scorers
R2	2 September 1969	Southampton	A	1–1	21,111	McNab
R2 R	4 September 1969	Southampton	H	2–0 (aet)	26,362	Graham (2)
R3	24 September 1969	Everton	H	0–0	36,102	
R3 R	1 October 1969	Everton	A	0–1	41,140	

=== Inter-Cities Fairs Cup ===
Round	Date	Opponent	Venue	Result	Attendance	Scorers
R1 L1	9 September 1969	(Northern Ireland) Glentoran	H	3–0	24,292	Gould, Graham (2)
R1 L2	29 September 1969	(Northern Ireland) Glentoran	A	0–1	13,000	
R2 L1	29 October 1969	Sporting Clube de Portugal	A	0–0	40,000	
R2 L2	26 November 1969	Sporting Clube de Portugal	H	3–0	35,253	Graham (2), Radford
R3 L1	17 December 1969	(France) Rouen	A	0–0	12,093	
R3 L2	13 January 1970	(France) Rouen	H	1–0	38,018	Sammels
QF L1	11 March 1970	(Romania) Dinamo Bacău	A	2–0	20,000	Radford, Sammels
QF L2	18 March 1970	(Romania) Dinamo Bacău	H	7–1	35,342	George (2), Graham, Radford (2), Sammels (2)
SF L1	8 April 1970	(Netherlands) Ajax	H	3–0	46,271	George (2), Sammels
SF L2	15 April 1970	(Netherlands) Ajax	A	0–1	32,000	
F L1	22 April 1970	(Belgium) Anderlecht	A	1–3	37,000	Kennedy
F L2	28 April 1970	(Belgium) Anderlecht	H	3–0	51,612	Kelly, Radford, Sammels

== Squad ==
Note: Flags indicate national team as defined under FIFA eligibility rules; some limited exceptions apply. Players may hold more than one non-FIFA nationality.

Pos.	Nation	Player
GK	SCO	Bob Wilson
GK	ENG	Geoff Barnett
GK	ENG	Malcolm Webster
DF	NIR	Pat Rice
DF	SCO	Frank McLintock
DF	ENG	Peter Simpson
DF	ENG	Bob McNab
DF	NIR	Sammy Nelson
DF	NIR	Terry Neill
DF	SCO	Ian Ure
DF	WAL	John Roberts

Pos.	Nation	Player
MF	ENG	George Armstrong
MF	SCO	George Graham
MF	ENG	Jon Sammels
MF	ENG	Peter Storey
MF	SCO	Eddie Kelly
MF	ENG	David Court
FW	ENG	Ray Kennedy
FW	ENG	John Radford
FW	ENG	Charlie George
FW	ENG	Bobby Gould
FW	SCO	Peter Marinello
