= 1969–70 Manchester United F.C. season =

English football club season

Manchester United F.C.
1969–70 season
- Chairman: Louis Edwards
- Manager: Wilf McGuinness
- First Division: 8th
- FA Cup: Third place
- League Cup: Semi-finals
- Top goalscorer: League: George Best (15); All: George Best (23)
- Highest home attendance: 63,418 vs Manchester City (17 December 1969); 63,418 vs Middlesbrough (25 February 1970)
- Lowest home attendance: 26,582 vs West Bromwich Albion (8 April 1970)
- Average home league attendance: 51,152
Home colours	Away colours	Third colours

The 1969–70 season was Manchester United's 68th season in the Football League, and their 25th consecutive season in the top division of English football. Before the beginning of the season, on 4 June 1969, United manager Matt Busby stepped down as manager after 24 years as manager. McGuinness guided United to an eighth-place finish in his first season as manager, and they reached the semi-finals of both the FA Cup and the League Cup.

== First Division ==
Date	Opponents	H / A	Result F–A	Scorers	Attendance
9 August 1969	Crystal Palace	A	2–2	Charlton, Morgan	48,610
13 August 1969	Everton	H	0–2		57,752
16 August 1969	Southampton	H	1–4	Morgan	46,328
19 August 1969	Everton	A	0–3		53,185
23 August 1969	Wolverhampton Wanderers	A	0–0		50,783
27 August 1969	Newcastle United	H	0–0		52,774
30 August 1969	Sunderland	H	3–1	Best, Givens, Kidd	50,570
6 September 1969	Leeds United	A	2–2	Best (2)	44,271
13 September 1969	Liverpool	H	1–0	Morgan	56,509
17 September 1969	Sheffield Wednesday	A	3–1	Best (2), Kidd	39,298
20 September 1969	Arsenal	A	2–2	Best, Sadler	59,498
27 September 1969	West Ham United	H	5–2	Best (2), Burns, Charlton, Kidd	58,579
4 October 1969	Derby County	A	0–2		40,724
8 October 1969	Southampton	A	3–0	Best, Burns, Kidd	31,044
11 October 1969	Ipswich Town	H	2–1	Best, Kidd	52,281
18 October 1969	Nottingham Forest	H	1–1	Best	53,702
25 October 1969	West Bromwich Albion	A	1–2	Kidd	45,120
1 November 1969	Stoke City	H	1–1	Charlton	53,406
8 November 1969	Coventry City	A	2–1	Aston, Law	43,446
15 November 1969	Manchester City	A	0–4		63,013
22 November 1969	Tottenham Hotspur	H	3–1	Charlton (2), Burns	50,003
29 November 1969	Burnley	A	1–1	Best	23,770
6 December 1969	Chelsea	H	0–2		49,344
13 December 1969	Liverpool	A	4–1	Charlton, Morgan, Ure, own goal	47,682
26 December 1969	Wolverhampton Wanderers	H	0–0		50,806
27 December 1969	Sunderland	A	1–1	Kidd	36,504
10 January 1970	Arsenal	H	2–1	Morgan, Sartori	41,055
17 January 1970	West Ham United	A	0–0		41,643
26 January 1970	Leeds United	H	2–2	Kidd, Sadler	59,879
31 January 1970	Derby County	H	1–0	Charlton	59,315
10 February 1970	Ipswich Town	A	1–0	Kidd	29,755
14 February 1970	Crystal Palace	H	1–1	Kidd	54,711
28 February 1970	Stoke City	A	2–2	Morgan, Sartori	38,917
17 March 1970	Burnley	H	3–3	Best, Crerand, Law	38,377
21 March 1970	Chelsea	A	1–2	Morgan	61,479
28 March 1970	Manchester City	H	1–2	Kidd	59,777
30 March 1970	Coventry City	H	1–1	Kidd	38,647
31 March 1970	Nottingham Forest	A	2–1	Charlton, Gowling	39,228
4 April 1970	Newcastle United	A	1–5	Charlton	43,094
8 April 1970	West Bromwich Albion	H	7–0	Charlton (2), Fitzpatrick (2), Gowling (2), Best	26,582
13 April 1970	Tottenham Hotspur	A	1–2	Fitzpatrick	41,808
15 April 1970	Sheffield Wednesday	H	2–2	Best, Charlton	36,649

Pos	Team	Pld	W	D	L	GF	GA	GAv	Pts	Qualification or relegation
6	Coventry City	42	19	11	12	58	48	1.208	49	Qualification for the Inter-Cities Fairs Cup first round
7	Newcastle United	42	17	13	12	57	35	1.629	47	Qualification for the Inter-Cities Fairs Cup first round
8	Manchester United	42	14	17	11	66	61	1.082	45	Qualification for the Watney Cup (Note: Derby County and Manchester United qualified for the Watney Cup as the two teams with the most goals that hadn't already qualified for a European competition.)
9	Stoke City	42	15	15	12	56	52	1.077	45	
10	Manchester City	42	16	11	15	55	48	1.146	43	Qualification for the Cup Winners' Cup first round (Note: Manchester City qualified for the Cup Winners' Cup first round as the 1969–70 European Cup Winners' Cup winners.)

Source: World Football
Rules for classification: 1) Points; 2) Goal average; 3) Goals scored

== FA Cup ==
Date	Round	Opponents	H / A	Result F–A	Scorers	Attendance
3 January 1970	Round 3	Ipswich Town	A	1–0	own goal	29,552
24 January 1970	Round 4	Manchester City	H	3–0	Kidd (2), Morgan	63,417
7 February 1970	Round 5	Northampton Town	A	8–2	Best (6), Kidd (2)	21,771
21 February 1970	Round 6	Middlesbrough	A	1–1	Sartori	40,000
25 February 1970	Round 6 Replay	Middlesbrough	H	2–1	Charlton, Morgan	63,418
14 March 1970	Semi-Final	Leeds United	N	0–0		55,000
23 March 1970	Semi-Final; Replay	Leeds United	N	0–0 (a.e.t.)		62,500
26 March 1970	Semi-Final; Second Replay	Leeds United	N	0–1		56,000
10 April 1970	Third Place Playoff	Watford	N	2–0	Kidd (2)	15,105

== League Cup ==
Date	Round	Opponents	H / A	Result F–A	Scorers	Attendance
3 September 1969	Round 2	Middlesbrough	H	1–0	Sadler	38,939
23 September 1969	Round 3	Wrexham	H	2–0	Kidd, Best	48,347
14 October 1969	Round 4	Burnley	A	0–0		27,959
20 October 1969	Round 4 Replay	Burnley	H	1–0	Best	50,275
12 November 1969	Round 5	Derby County	A	0–0		38,895
19 November 1969	Round 5 Replay	Derby County	H	1–0	Kidd	57,393
3 December 1969	Semi Final; First Leg	Manchester City	A	1–2	Charlton	55,799
17 December 1969	Semi Final; Second Leg	Manchester City	H	2–2	Edwards, Law	63,418

== Squad statistics ==
Pos.	Name	League		FA Cup		League Cup		Total	
Pos.	Name	Apps	Goals	Apps	Goals	Apps	Goals	Apps	Goals
GK	(England) Jimmy Rimmer	5	0	0	0	0	0	5	0
GK	(England) Alex Stepney	37	0	9	0	8	0	54	0
DF	(Republic of Ireland) Shay Brennan	8(1)	0	1	0	1	0	10(1)	0
DF	(Scotland) Francis Burns	30(2)	3	3(1)	0	6	0	39(3)	3
DF	(Republic of Ireland) Tony Dunne	33	0	7	0	8	0	48	0
DF	(England) Paul Edwards	18(1)	0	7	0	2	1	27(1)	1
DF	(England) Bill Foulkes	3	0	0	0	0	0	3	0
DF	(England) Steve James	2	0	0	0	1	0	3	0
DF	(England) David Sadler	40	2	9	0	8	1	57	3
DF	(Scotland) Ian Ure	34	1	7	0	7	0	48	1
MF	(England) John Aston, Jr.	21(1)	1	1(1)	0	6	0	28(2)	1
MF	(Northern Ireland) George Best	37	15	8	6	8	2	53	23
MF	(England) Bobby Charlton	40	12	9	1	8	1	57	14
MF	(Scotland) Paddy Crerand	25	1	9	0	2	0	36	1
MF	(Scotland) John Fitzpatrick	20	3	1	0	5	0	26	3
MF	(Scotland) Willie Morgan	35	7	9	2	5	0	49	9
MF	(Scotland) Jimmy Ryan	0(1)	0	0	0	0	0	0(1)	0
MF	(Italy) Carlo Sartori	13(4)	2	7	1	1(2)	0	21(6)	3
MF	(England) Nobby Stiles	8	0	3	0	2	0	13	0
FW	(Republic of Ireland) Don Givens	4(4)	1	0	0	1	0	5(4)	1
FW	(England) Alan Gowling	6(1)	3	0	0	0(1)	0	6(2)	3
FW	(England) Brian Kidd	33(1)	12	9	6	6	2	48(1)	20
FW	(Scotland) Denis Law	10(1)	2	0(2)	0	3	1	13(3)	3
–	Own goals	–	1	–	1	–	0	–	2
