= Bobby Seith =

Scottish footballer and manager

Personal information
- Full name: Robert Seith
- Date of birth: 9 March 1932 (age 94)
- Place of birth: Coatbridge, Scotland
- Position: Right half

Youth career
- Monifeith Tayside
- 1948–1953: Burnley

Senior career*
Years	Team	Apps	(Gls)
1953–1960	Burnley	211	(6)
1960–1965	Dundee	134	(5)
Total		345	(11)

International career
1962	SFL trial v SFA	1	(0)

Managerial career
- 1968–1970: Preston North End
- 1970–1974: Heart of Midlothian
- * Club domestic league appearances and goals

Robert Seith (born 9 March 1932) is a Scottish former football player and manager. He won league championships in both England and Scotland, with Burnley and Dundee respectively.

== Playing career ==
Seith began his professional career with Burnley, whom he joined in 1948 aged 16. He made his debut for the Clarets in 1953, in a 2–1 away victory against Manchester United, and soon became their regular right half. By 1959–60 Burnley had become a genuine title challenger and Seith played 27 games in that league campaign as they moved towards their first championship since 1920–21. However a defensive blip in a game against challengers Wolves saw him dropped in March 1960 and he was still absent from the side when they eventually clinched the title.

That summer, a dispute with the Burnley chairman led to Seith's transfer back to Scotland, where he joined Dundee for £7,500. The Dens Park side contained famous names such as Alan Gilzean, Gordon Smith and Ian Ure and was a potent threat to the traditional dominance of the Old Firm, eventually winning the League title in the 1961–62 season. This allowed Seith the opportunity to compete in the European Cup which had been denied him by his acrimonious departure from Turf Moor and he featured prominently in the Dark Blues run to the semi-final, where they eventually lost to eventual winners A.C. Milan.

== Coaching career ==
Seith retired from playing in 1964, joining the Dundee coaching staff before moving to a similar role with Rangers; he was to resign from his Rangers post in protest at the sacking of manager Scot Symon in 1967. He earned his first opportunity as a manager when appointed to replace Jimmy Milne at Preston North End but left in 1970. He had a brief period in charge of the Scottish national youth team before being hired as manager of Heart of Midlothian. It was Seith who brought striker Drew Busby to Tynecastle. The Maroons had endured several seasons of mediocrity prior to Seith's appointment but gradually improved under his charge and in the 1973–74 season topped the League for several months following a 13-match unbeaten run. An inconsistent finish saw them narrowly miss out on European qualification though and following a 10 games winless streak at the beginning of 1974–75, he was dismissed.

Seith left the football business following his departure from Tynecastle and has since worked as a chiropodist, based in Broughty Ferry. He was belatedly awarded a medal for his efforts in Burnley's 1959–60 league title win in 1999, having been denied one at the time due a dispute with the then club chairman. He was presented with this medal in a public ceremony prior to a Burnley home match in October 1999.
