= Bobby Adamson =

Scottish footballer

Personal information
- Full name: Robert Adamson
- Position: Outside left

Senior career*
Years	Team	Apps	(Gls)
- Muirkirk
1960–1961	Dundee	8	(1)
1961–1963	Raith Rovers	50	(14)
1963–1965	Greenock Morton		
1965–1970	St Mirren	152	(43)
1970	Arbroath		
- * Club domestic league appearances and goals

Robert 'Bobby' Adamson is a Scottish former footballer who played for Greenock Morton, Raith Rovers, St Mirren and Arbroath.
