= Ernie Collumbine =

Scottish footballer (1938–2019)

Personal information
- Date of birth: 1938
- Place of birth: Carronshore, Scotland
- Date of death: June 2019 (aged 80–81)
- Positions: Wing half; sweeper

Senior career*
Years	Team	Apps	(Gls)
- Bo'ness United
1958–1961	Stenhousemuir		
1961–1965	East Stirlingshire		
1965–1966	St Johnstone	5	(0)
1966–1969	Clydebank	99	(5)
Total		104+	(5+)
- * Club domestic league appearances and goals

Ernie Collumbine (1938 – 19 June 2019) was a Scottish professional footballer who played as a wing half and sweeper.

== Career ==
Born in Carronshore, Collumbine played for Bo'ness United, Stenhousemuir, East Stirlingshire (captaining the side to promotion to the First Division), St Johnstone and Clydebank.
