= Craig Brown (footballer, born 1940) =

Scottish football manager (1940–2023)

Craig Brown CBE

Personal information
- Full name: James Craig Brown
- Date of birth: 1 July 1940
- Place of birth: Glasgow, Scotland
- Date of death: 26 June 2023 (aged 82)
- Place of death: Ayr, Scotland
- Position: Wing half

Youth career
- Kilmarnock Amateurs

Senior career*
| Years | Team | Apps | (Gls) |
| 1957–1961 | Rangers | 0 | (0) |
| 1957–1958 | → Coltness United (loan) | | |
| 1960–1961 | → Dundee (loan) | | |
| 1961–1965 | Dundee | 14 | (0) |
| 1965–1967 | Falkirk | 17 | (0) |
| Total | | 31 | (0) |

Managerial career
- 1977–1986: Clyde
- 1986–1993: Scotland U21
- 1993–2001: Scotland
- 1994–1995: Scotland B
- 2002–2004: Preston North End
- 2009–2010: Motherwell
- 2010–2013: Aberdeen
- * Club domestic league appearances and goals

James Craig Brown (1 July 1940 – 26 June 2023) was a Scottish professional football player and manager. After his playing career with Rangers, Dundee and Falkirk was curtailed by a series of knee injuries, Brown entered management with Clyde in 1977. He then coached various Scotland youth teams until he was appointed Scotland manager in 1993. He held this position until 2001, the longest tenure for a Scotland manager, and they qualified for the UEFA Euro 1996 and 1998 FIFA World Cup tournaments. He later managed Preston North End, Motherwell and Aberdeen. He retired from management in 2013 and was appointed a non-executive director of Aberdeen.

== Early life ==
Brown was born on 1 July 1940 in Corkerhill, Glasgow, but brought up with two younger brothers in Troon, Rutherglen and Hamilton, mother Margaret Caldow, moving with his father's career as a physical education teacher, later a senior advisor on the subject. He was a keen golfer as well as watching Queen's Park and Hamilton Academical matches.

== Playing career ==
=== Early career ===
Educated at the former Hamilton Academy, Brown played for the school in Scottish schools competitions and in youth international teams, before joining Rangers in 1957, being considered a top prospect.

=== Rangers ===
Brown was initially farmed out to Coltness United to gain experience, and was selected for the Scotland Junior squad. He failed to find a regular first team place at Rangers, with his progress halted by a knee injury and the arrival of Jim Baxter who played in the same position, and moved to Dundee on loan in October 1960.

=== Dundee ===
Brown was the first signing of Dundee manager Bob Shankly. Although knee surgery meant he barely played for the first team during his loan, the move was made permanent in the summer of 1961. Brown always travelled with the Dundee first team squad but this was before substitutes were commonly used. Thus he did not make a competitive appearance until November 1961, then waited until February 1962 for his league debut when captain Bobby Cox was injured. Brown played in nine consecutive league games before becoming injured himself on 31 March in a 3–2 win against bottom placed Stirling Albion. Dundee won the Scottish league title that season and Brown's nine appearances entitled him to a medal. Brown stayed at Dundee for four and a half injury-affected years, making 16 total appearances for the Dark Blues but playing no active part in the club's European Cup run, or the 1964 Scottish Cup Final which they lost to Rangers. During that time he also completed a course in physical education and primary teaching at Jordanhill College, and was also a member of the pop music group Hammy and the Hamsters formed by six Dundee players.

=== Falkirk ===
Brown signed for Falkirk in 1965 on a part-time basis and went on to make 42 total appearances at Brockville. He was released in 1967 and signed for Stranraer, but his injured knee almost immediately required him to call time on his playing career, and he returned the signing-on fee he had received from the club.

== Managerial career ==
=== Clyde ===
Brown quickly showed a keen interest in being involved in the coaching side of football and he became assistant manager of Motherwell in 1974. He got his first managerial job as part-time manager of Clyde in 1977, where he spent ten seasons – winning the Second Division championship in his first season – whilst also working as a primary school head teacher then a lecturer in primary education at Craigie College, Ayr.

=== Scotland ===
Brown was in charge of Scotland's youth teams. In 1989, he coached Scotland's Under-16s to the final of the 1989 FIFA U-16 World Championship and three years later coached the under-21s to the semi-finals of the 1992 UEFA Under-21 Championship.

In July 1986, he took up the post of assistant manager of Scotland, also with responsibility for the under-21 team. Brown was assistant manager to Alex Ferguson for the Scotland senior team's campaign at the 1986 FIFA World Cup (the appointment he said 'changed his life' as it enabled him to move from being a part-time manager and teacher to a full member of the national coaching setup), and served the same role under Andy Roxburgh at the 1990 FIFA World Cup and UEFA Euro 1992. He succeeded Roxburgh initially on an interim basis, after the team failed to qualify for the 1994 FIFA World Cup; his debut was a 3–1 loss away to Italy.

==== Euro 1996 ====
Brown took Scotland to Euro 96, as the team only conceded three goals in 10 qualifying matches as they finished second in Group 8. An Ally McCoist goal against Greece, scored with his first touch as a substitute after a long period out of international football due to a broken leg, proved key to securing qualification.

Scotland were drawn in the finals with the Netherlands, England (the host nation) and Switzerland. The opening game against the Netherlands ended in a goalless draw, then the match against England hinged on two moments late in the second half. With the score standing at 1–0 to England, Gary McAllister had a penalty kick saved by David Seaman and almost straight away Paul Gascoigne scored a brilliant goal to secure a 2–0 England win. This left Scotland needing an unlikely combination of results from the final games to qualify, but for a while this was happening as another McCoist goal gave them a 1–0 lead against Switzerland while the Netherlands were losing 4–0 to England. The Scots were unable to add to their lead, however, and a goal by Patrick Kluivert narrowed the Dutch defeat to 4–1, which meant that they progressed on goals scored.

==== 1998 World Cup ====
Scotland also qualified for the 1998 World Cup under Brown, again only conceding three goals in their 10 qualifying matches as they finished second in UEFA Group 4. A notable incident during that qualifying phase was when Estonia refused to turn up for a match in Tallinn against Scotland. Brown had complained about the poor standard of floodlighting at the Kadriorg Stadium, which prompted FIFA to bring forward the kick-off time on the morning of the game. This decision upset the Estonians, who had their preparations disrupted and stood to lose some television revenue. Brown thought the Estonians would just protest the kick-off change and turn up at the last minute, but they did not and Scotland were left to kick-off without any opposition. The FIFA delegate at the match believed Scotland would be awarded a walkover win, but instead a committee ordered the game to be replayed at a neutral site.

Scotland were drawn in Group A at the finals with Brazil, Norway and Morocco. As Brazil were the World Cup holders, this meant that Scotland played in the opening match of the tournament. Much of the preparation for that match focused on how to stop the star Brazilian striker Ronaldo, with his former club manager Bobby Robson advising Brown that the only way would be to stop him receiving the ball. The Scots were able to restrict Ronaldo, but lost 2–1 due to a Cesar Sampaio header from a corner and an unfortunate own goal by Tom Boyd. Brown cited a lack of on-field preparations immediately before the game, which were limited by opening match ceremonies, for them conceding the first goal from a set piece.

A 1–1 draw with Norway left Scotland needing a positive result against Morocco in their third match to have a chance of progressing. Scotland lost that match 3–0 and were eliminated them from the tournament, although a Norwegian win against Brazil meant that Morocco did not progress either. The result against Morocco was heavily criticised as Scotland had rarely conceded more than two goals in a game under Brown, although he cited secondary statistics (shots at goal, possession and corners) which suggested the performance was better than the one-sided scoreline.

==== Euro 2000 qualifying ====
Scotland finished second in their UEFA Euro 2000 qualifying group, which meant they entered a playoff against England. Scotland lost the first leg 2–0 at Hampden Park, but then won 1–0 at the old Wembley in the second, losing 2–1 on aggregate. Paul Scholes scored both England goals in the tie. Brown cited an injury to Paul Lambert, who would have been assigned with the task of marking Scholes, as being key to the Scots losing the tie.

==== 2002 World Cup qualification ====
After Scotland finished third in their 2002 FIFA World Cup qualification group and failed to qualify for the World Cup, Brown resigned as Scotland manager in October 2001. He was replaced by German Berti Vogts. Brown took charge of Scotland for 70 international matches, more than any other Scotland manager until Steve Clarke. He won 32 games, drew 18 and lost 20. Scotland did not qualify for another major tournament until Euro 2020, and 1998 was their last appearance in a men's World Cup finals for 28 years, until 2026.

=== Preston North End ===
Brown then had a spell in club management when he was appointed manager of Preston North End in April 2002, but left by mutual consent on 29 August 2004 after a poor start to the league campaign. He later had a brief spell as football consultant at Derby County under former protégé Billy Davies, helping them win promotion to the Premier League in 2006–07. He was one of eight members of staff sacked alongside Davies in November after a poor start to the 2007–08 Premier League season.

In October 2008, the 68-year-old Brown was linked to the vacant managerial position with Scottish First Division side Dundee, but the job went to Jocky Scott.

=== Motherwell ===
On 28 December 2009, it was announced that Brown would be taking charge of Motherwell, with Archie Knox as his assistant. Brown and Knox established Motherwell in the top six of the Scottish Premier League during their time in charge.

=== Aberdeen ===
Brown, who was working without a contract at Motherwell, rebuffed an initial approach by Aberdeen on 8 December 2010. He then had a change of heart after a second approach was made, and was appointed Aberdeen manager on 10 December.

On 14 March 2013, Brown announced he was retiring from football management at the end of the 2012–13 season. His retirement date was brought forward when Derek McInnes was appointed to the position on 5 April, with Brown accepting a position on the Aberdeen board.

== Personal life ==
Brown was appointed Commander of the Order of the British Empire (CBE) in the 1999 Birthday Honours for services to football. Brown was also awarded an honorary Doctorate of Arts by Abertay University in 2001.

Brown had two brothers: Jock was a football commentator, and Bob was the minister at Queen's Cross Parish Church in Aberdeen from 1984 until his retirement in 2008. Brown's grandson and namesake, Craig, plays for Montrose.

Brown died on 26 June 2023, five days before his 83rd birthday. His funeral was held at Masonhill Crematorium in Ayr, followed by a memorial service at Ayr Racecourse, on 25 July.

== Managerial statistics ==
| Team | From | To | Record | | | | |
| Team | From | To | G | W | D | L | Win % |
|---|---|---|---|---|---|---|---|
| Clyde | August 1977 | May 1986 | 410 | 136 | 118 | 156 | 33.17 |
| Scotland U21 | September 1986 | November 1993 | 44 | 19 | 7 | 18 | 43.18 |
| Scotland (Note: Brown's Scotland record includes one 1993 match in interim charge (Italy 3–1 Scotland) prior to his full appointment; it is not included in his SFA website profile, which assigns no manager to this fixture.) | 13 October 1993 | 30 October 2001 | 71 | 32 | 18 | 21 | 45.07 |
| Scotland B | February 1994 | February 1995 | 2 | 1 | 0 | 1 | 50.00 |
| Preston North End | 29 April 2002 | 29 August 2004 | 106 | 36 | 30 | 40 | 33.96 |
| Motherwell | 29 December 2009 | 10 December 2010 | 44 | 21 | 9 | 14 | 47.73 |
| Aberdeen | 13 December 2010 | 6 April 2013 | 106 | 36 | 30 | 40 | 33.96 |
| Total | | | 791 | 282 | 216 | 293 | 35.65 |

== Honours ==
=== Player ===
Dundee

- Scottish league champion: 1961–62

=== Manager ===
Clyde

- Scottish Second Division: 1977–78, 1981–82

Scotland U16

- FIFA under-16 World Cup: Runner-up 1989

Scotland U21

- UEFA under-21 Euros: Bronze 1992
- Toulon Tournament: Bronze 1991, 1993

Individual

- Scottish Premier League manager of the month: January 2010, February 2010, January 2012 and October 2012
