= Ally Hill =

Scottish footballer (1934–2018)

Personal information
- Full name: Alastair Greenwood Hill
- Date of birth: 25 April 1934
- Place of birth: Glasgow, Scotland
- Date of death: 18 December 2018 (aged 84)
- Place of death: Blairgowrie, Scotland
- Position: Right winger

Youth career
- Jeanfield Swifts

Senior career*
| Years | Team | Apps | (Gls) |
| 1952–1958 | Clyde | 71 | (20) |
| 1958–1960 | Dundee | 23 | (4) |
| 1960 | Bristol City | 3 | (0) |
| 1960 | Stirling Albion | 9 | (1) |
| 1960–1961 | Falkirk | 3 | (1) |
| Total | | 109 | (26) |

International career
| 1955 | Scotland U23 | 1 | (0) |
- * Club domestic league appearances and goals

Alastair Greenwood Hill (25 April 1934 – 18 December 2018) was a Scottish footballer. He won the 1955 Scottish Cup with Clyde.

Hill died in Blairgowrie on 18 December 2018, at the age of 84.
