= Pat Liney =

Scottish footballer (1936–2022)

Personal information
- Full name: Patrick Liney
- Date of birth: 14 July 1936
- Place of birth: Paisley, Scotland
- Date of death: 10 August 2022 (aged 86)
- Place of death: Broughty Ferry, Scotland
- Position: Goalkeeper

Youth career
- –1957: Dalry Thistle

Senior career*
Years	Team	Apps	(Gls)
1957–1963	Dundee	102	(0)
1963–1966	St Mirren	48	(0)
1966–1967	Bradford Park Avenue	11	(0)
1967–1972	Bradford City	147	(0)
1972–1973	Bradford Park Avenue		
Total		308	(0)
- * Club domestic league appearances and goals

Patrick Liney (14 July 1936 – 10 August 2022) was a Scottish professional footballer who played as a goalkeeper. He played for clubs in both Scotland and England for Dalry Thistle, Dundee, St Mirren, Bradford Park Avenue and Bradford City.

Born in Paisley, Liney was Dundee's first-choice goalkeeper during their 1961–62 Scottish Division One season, in which Dundee won the only league championship in the club's history. A vital part of achieving this goal, league-winning teammate Alan Gilzean stated of him that "Pat Liney's contribution to Dundee's Championship season should never be underestimated and the fact that he was an ever present that year speaks for itself. He was rock solid and never let us down." After his playing career, Liney was nominated to Dundee's Hall of Fame and appointed as Honorary Club President.

== Playing career ==
=== Dundee ===
After spending his youth seasons with Scottish Junior Football Association side Dalry Thistle, Liney was signed by Dundee in 1957. He made his debut for the Dee in the final game of the 1957–58 season against Rangers at Ibrox, keeping a clean sheet in a 1–0 away win. Liney played two games for Dundee the following season, and took over as first choice goalkeeper beginning the 1959–60 season following the departure of Bill Brown to Tottenham Hotspur. During Liney's three seasons as Dundee's first-choice goalie, he played a further 97 league games, as well as 3 appearances in the Scottish Cup, 16 in the Scottish League Cup, and five games in the 1962 International Soccer League.

Liney's defining moment as Dundee's league-winning keeper came in the penultimate game of the season at home against his boyhood club, St Mirren. With a chance to overtake Rangers in the title race who lost to Aberdeen, Dundee gave away a late penalty to St Mirren while holding a slender 1–0 lead. Despite the weight of a title fight sitting on his shoulders, Liney clawed down Jim Clunie's shot to the top-right corner, and minutes later Dundee scored a second goal to secure a win and clear the way for a league win. After the full-time whistle, a pitch invasion ensued and Liney had to be escorted to the pavilion by four policemen. In a 2011 interview, Liney said about the penalty that he "was probably the coolest guy in the packed ground" as his father, also a lifelong Buddies fan, told him exactly where Clunie would place his penalty.

Unfortunately, Liney made only two more appearances for Dundee as he was replaced as first choice by ex-Liverpool goalie Bert Slater. By the end of his time with Dundee, Liney had made a total of 126 appearances for the Dark Blues, 102 of them being in the league.

=== St Mirren ===
Liney left Dundee in 1963 to join fellow Scottish Division One side St Mirren. A lifelong supporter of the Buddies, Liney described the feeling of making his debut for them in a 2013 interview as "the best feeling in the world." Liney made 48 league appearances for St Mirren over three seasons, and left the club in 1966.

=== England ===
Liney moved to Bradford Park Avenue in 1966, before joining city rivals Bradford City the following year. He became a mainstay and fan favourite of the Bantams, becoming known for regularly singing in Bradford's Edwardian Club after matchdays. During Liney's time with the club, they enjoyed promotion from the English Fourth Division in 1968–69. Liney left the club in 1972 and returned to Bradford Park Avenue, but retired the following season.

== Post-playing career ==
A popular figure at Valley Parade, Liney spent the immediate years after retiring as Bradford City's host for pre-match hospitality until 1978, when he returned north to Scotland where he provided the same role regularly for Dundee. In 2011, Liney was inducted into the club's Hall of Fame, the first goalkeeper to receive the honour. Later on that same year, he was also appointed to be the Honorary Club President of Dundee.

Liney died in August 2022, at the age of 86.

== Honours ==
Dundee

- Scottish Division One: 1961–62
- Dundee Hall of Fame: 2011 Legends Award

Bradford City

- Football League Fourth Division promotion: 1968–69
