= Ian Ure =

Scottish footballer and manager

Personal information
- Full name: John Francombe Ure
- Date of birth: 7 December 1939 (age 86)
- Place of birth: Ayr, Scotland
- Position: Centre half

Youth career
- Ayr Albion

Senior career*
Years	Team	Apps	(Gls)
1958–1963	Dundee	107	(0)
1963–1969	Arsenal	168	(2)
1969–1971	Manchester United	47	(1)
1971–1973	St Mirren	3	(0)
Total		325	(3)

International career
1961	Scotland U23	1	(0)
1961–1962	Scottish League XI	4	(0)
1961–1967	Scotland	12	(0)
1962	SFA trial v SFL	1	(0)

Managerial career
- 1974–1975: East Stirlingshire
- * Club domestic league appearances and goals

John Francombe "Ian" Ure (born 7 December 1939) is a Scottish former football player and manager.

Ure started his career with Dundee, before moving to England to play for Arsenal and Manchester United. After eight years in England, Ure returned to Scotland to play for St Mirren, however, after two seasons with the club and only three league appearances, Ure went into football management with East Stirlingshire.

During his time with Dundee and Arsenal, Ure played on 12 occasions for the Scotland national team.

== Club career ==
Ure started his career as a centre-half with Ayr Albion. In 1958, after being scouted by the Dens Park club, Ure signed for Dundee where he remained for five seasons. During that time, the club won its one and only First Division title in 1961–62, and reached the semi-finals of the European Cup in 1962–63, losing 5–2 on aggregate to eventual champions Milan.

He moved south of the border in 1963 for a transfer fee of £62,500 to play for Arsenal. He only missed one match for Arsenal in his first season, but injury and a loss of form restricted his appearances in 1964–65 and 1965–66, although he still managed more than 20 matches each season. Ure was restored to the Arsenal line-up by Bertie Mee, however, and played 44 matches in 1966–67. Ure continued to feature regularly for Arsenal as the 1960s went on, but during this time made a couple of errors in big matches, exemplified by his mistake in the 1969 League Cup Final against Swindon Town, which allowed Roger Smart to score Swindon's opening goal; Swindon went on to win 3–1 after extra time.

Ure played 202 matches for Arsenal in defence over the course of six years, scoring two goals, and picking up two League Cup runners-up medals (1968 and 1969). He was famously involved in a number of clashes with Denis Law in the game against Manchester United in October 1967, that saw both players being sent off and subsequently receiving six-match bans. However, with Frank McLintock and Terry Neill competing for the centre half position, Ure found himself being squeezed out towards the end of that decade, and he left Arsenal in August 1969 to join Manchester United. The only major signing made by manager Wilf McGuinness, Ure spent two seasons at Manchester United before returning to Scotland to play for St Mirren.

After retiring from playing, he spent some time as a coach, including a spell as manager of East Stirlingshire, but later left the game completely, and was employed as a social worker in Kilmarnock.

== International career ==
During his time with Dundee, Ure won eight caps for Scotland. He made his debut international debut on 8 November 1961, in a 2–0 win against Wales. He made 12 appearances in total, with his last cap coming against Northern Ireland on 21 October 1967. One of his appearances was during a 1967 overseas tour that the Scottish Football Association decided in October 2021 to reclassify as a full international, which increased Ure's cap tally from 11 to 12.

== Career statistics ==
Career statistics
Club	Season	League			Cup		League cup		Continental		Other		Total	
Club	Season	Division	Apps	Goals	Apps	Goals	Apps	Goals	Apps	Goals	Apps	Goals	Apps	Goals
Dundee	1958–59	Division One	2	0										
Dundee	1959–60	Division One	7	0										
Dundee	1960–61	Division One	32	0										
Dundee	1961–62	Division One	34	0										
Dundee	1962–63	Division One	32	0										
Dundee	Total		107	0										
Arsenal	1963–64	First Division	41	1	4	0	—		4	0	—		49	1
Arsenal	1964–65	First Division	22	1	2	0	—		—		—		24	1
Arsenal	1965–66	First Division	21	0	0	0	—		—		1	0	22	0
Arsenal	1966–67	First Division	37	0	3	0	4	0	—		—		44	0
Arsenal	1967–68	First Division	21	0	3	0	5	0	—		—		29	0
Arsenal	1968–69	First Division	23	0	4	0	5	0	—		—		32	0
Arsenal	1969–70	First Division	3	0	0	0	0	0	—		—		3	0
Arsenal	Total		168	2	16	0	14	0	4	0	1	0	203	2
Manchester United	1969–70	First Division	34	1	7	0	7	0	0	0	0	0	48	1
Manchester United	1970–71	First Division	13	0	1	0	3	0	0	0	3	0	20	0
Manchester United	1971–72	First Division	0	0	0	0	0	0	0	0	0	0	0	0
Manchester United	Total		47	1	8	0	10	0	0	0	3	0	68	1
St Mirren	1972–73	Division Two	3	0										
St Mirren	1973–74	Division Two	0	0										
St Mirren	Total		3	0										
Career total			325	3										

== Honours ==
Arsenal

- Football League Cup runner-up: 1967–68, 1968–69

== See also ==
- List of Scotland national football team captains
