= George Ryden =

Scottish footballer (1940–2021)

Personal information
- Date of birth: 14 July 1940
- Place of birth: Dumbarton, Scotland
- Date of death: 12 December 2021 (aged 81)
- Position: Centre-half

Youth career
- Duntocher Hibs

Senior career*
Years	Team	Apps	(Gls)
1963–1966	Dundee	52	(2)
1966–1969	St Johnstone	25	(0)
1969–1970	Stirling Albion	3	(0)
Total		80	(2)
- * Club domestic league appearances and goals

George Ryden (14 July 1940 – 12 December 2021) was a Scottish footballer who played as a centre-half for Dundee, St Johnstone and Stirling Albion. Ryden played for Dundee in the 1964 Scottish Cup Final, which they lost 3–1 to Rangers. He died on 12 December 2021, at the age of 81.
