= Gordon Smith (footballer, born 1924) =

Scottish footballer (1924–2004)

Personal information
- Date of birth: 25 May 1924
- Place of birth: Edinburgh, Scotland
- Date of death: 7 August 2004 (aged 80)
- Place of death: North Berwick, Scotland
- Position: Outside right

Youth career
- 1935–1938: Bromford Boys Club
- 1938–1940: Kirriemuir Harp
- 1939: → Kirriemuir Thistle
- 1939: → Montrose Roselea
- 1940: → Hillside United
- 1940–1941: Dundee North End

Senior career*
| Years | Team | Apps | (Gls) |
| 1941–1959 | Hibernian | 310 | (125) |
| 1959–1961 | Heart of Midlothian | 42 | (13) |
| 1961–1964 | Dundee | 70 | (9) |
| 1964 | Drumcondra | 1 | (0) |
| Total | | 430 | (147) |

International career
| 1938 | Scotland (Schoolboys) | 2 | (2) |
| 1941 | Scottish Junior XI | 1 | (3) |
| 1946–1957 | Scotland | 19 | (4) |
| 1948–1955 | Scottish League XI | 11 | (3) |
- * Club domestic league appearances and goals

Gordon Smith (25 May 1924 – 7 August 2004) was a Scottish footballer. He is the only player to have won a Scottish league championship with three clubs: Hibernian, Heart of Midlothian, and Dundee. Smith also represented Scotland and the Scottish League XI.

== Club career ==
=== Hibernian ===
Born in Edinburgh, Smith spent most of his childhood in Montrose in Angus. He showed great footballing promise in his school days at Southesk and Montrose Academy, earning two Scottish schoolboy caps at aged 14. At the juvenile and junior level, he played for Bromford, Kirriemuir Harp (turning out a few times for junior sides Montrose Roselea and Kirriemuir Thistle) and Dundee North End. Smith scored an abundance of goals in his junior days, regularly netting a hat-trick and even as many as eight goals a match.

On 14 April 1941, Smith played for a Scottish Junior select side against a Hearts and Hibs select to celebrate the opening of Lochee Harp's Beechwood Park, scoring a hat-trick. Afterwards, both Edinburgh club's quickly sought his signature. Smith had been due to sign for his boyhood favourites Hearts, but the 16-year-old was signed by Hibs as a professional and played against their Edinburgh rivals on his debut, scoring a hat-trick in a 5–3 victory at Tynecastle on 28 April 1941.

The "Gay Gordon" soon established himself as an idol for a whole generation of post-war football fans. Alongside Bobby Johnstone, Lawrie Reilly, Eddie Turnbull, and Willie Ormond, Smith became part of the "Famous Five", the most celebrated forward line in Hibs' history. During the late 1940s and 1950s Smith and the Famous Five ensured Hibs were one of the most successful sides in Scotland, both sporting-wise and at the turnstiles. The League title was captured three times (1948, 1951, 1952), while 1953 saw Rangers pip Hibs only through the goal average system. Smith was less successful in cup competition however, reaching only one Scottish Cup Final with Hibs, which they lost 2–1 to Aberdeen in 1947.

A recurring ankle injury led to Hibs releasing him in 1959.

=== Heart of Midlothian ===
Smith believed that an operation could cure the injury. Smith paid for an operation on the offending ankle himself, and then he signed for Hearts. He was to enjoy immediate success at Tynecastle, winning both the league and the League Cup in his first season with the club.

After an injury-plagued second season with Hearts, Smith was released and again the football writers prepared obituaries for the veteran's career.

=== Dundee ===
Smith was to again confound contemporary wisdom, signing for Dundee and forming a part of their league winning side in 1962. At the age of 38, Smith had achieved the unique distinction of being the only player to win the league title with three different teams, none of them with either half of the traditionally dominant Old Firm.

In the following season Smith was paired in a forward line with Alan Gilzean. They helped Dundee to the European Cup semi-finals, where they performed gallantly in an aggregate defeat to A.C. Milan. After leaving Dundee, he played briefly for Drumcondra in the Republic of Ireland, before finally retiring at the end of the 1963–64 season.

== International career ==
During his playing career, Gordon Smith was capped 19 times by Scotland, scoring four goals. Smith was compared with his English contemporaries Stanley Matthews and Tom Finney, but he did not appear to have a "big-match temperament". Smith had to compete for selection with Rangers winger Willie Waddell, who was capped 17 times in the same period. In addition to his appearances for the national team, Smith appeared 11 times for the Scottish League XI.

== Career statistics ==
=== International appearances ===
As of 4 March 2019

International statistics
| National team | Year | Apps | Goals |
|---|---|---|---|
| Scotland | 1946 | 2 | 0 |
| Scotland | 1947 | 2 | 0 |
| Scotland | 1948 | 3 | 0 |
| Scotland | 1949 | — | |
| Scotland | 1950 | — | |
| Scotland | 1951 | — | |
| Scotland | 1952 | 2 | 0 |
| Scotland | 1953 | — | |
| Scotland | 1954 | — | |
| Scotland | 1955 | 6 | 3 |
| Scotland | 1956 | 1 | 0 |
| Scotland | 1957 | 3 | 1 |
| Total | | 19 | 4 |

=== International goals ===
As of 4 March 2019

International goals by date, venue, cap, opponent, score, result and competition
| No. | Date | Venue | Cap | Opponent | Score | Result | Competition |
|---|---|---|---|---|---|---|---|
| 1 | 15 May 1955 | JNA Stadium, Belgrade | 11 | Yugoslavia | 2–2 | 2–2 | Friendly match |
| 2 | 19 May 1955 | Prater Stadium, Vienna | 12 | Austria | 2–0 | 4–1 | Friendly match |
| 3 | 29 May 1955 | Nepstadion, Budapest | 13 | Hungary | 1–0 | 1–3 | Friendly match |
| 4 | 26 May 1957 | Estadio Santiago Bernabéu, Madrid | 19 | Spain | 1–3 | 1–4 | 1958 FIFA World Cup qualification |

== Honours ==
Hibernian

- Scottish Division A: 1947–48, 1950–51, 1951–52
- Southern League Cup: 1943–44
- Wilson Cup: 1944–45, 1945–46
- Rosebery Charity Cup: 1944–45

Heart of Midlothian

- Scottish Division One: 1959–60
- Scottish League Cup: 1959–60

Dundee

- Scottish Division One: 1961–62

Scotland

- British Home Championship: 1955–56 (shared)

Dundee North End

- Forfarshire Junior Consolation Cup: 1940-41

Individual

- Rex Kingsley Footballer of the Year: Inaugural, 1951
- Scottish Sports Hall of Fame: 2003
- Scottish Football Hall of Fame: 2004
- Dundee Hall of Fame: Legends Award 2012
- Hibernian Hall of Fame: Inaugural inductee, 2010

== See also ==
- List of Scotland national football team captains
