= Jimmy Bonthrone =

Scottish footballer, coach, and manager

Personal information
- Full name: James Bonthrone
- Date of birth: 16 June 1929
- Place of birth: Kinglassie, Fife, Scotland
- Date of death: 7 June 2008 (aged 78)
- Position: Inside forward

Senior career*
Years	Team	Apps	(Gls)
1949–1957	East Fife	222	(85)
1957–1959	Dundee	30	(15)
1959–1961	Stirling Albion	43	(21)
1961–1962	Queen of the South	6	(0)
Total		301	(121)

International career
1953	Scotland B	1	(0)

Managerial career
- 1963–1969: East Fife
- 1971–1975: Aberdeen
- * Club domestic league appearances and goals

James Bonthrone (16 June 1929 – 7 June 2008) was a Scottish professional football player, coach and manager.

Born in Kinglassie, Fife, Bonthrone's playing career centred on his time with a successful East Fife team, although he also played for Dundee, Stirling Albion and for George Farm at Queen of the South. He won the Scottish League Cup as a player with East Fife in 1953.

After retiring as a player, Bonthrone managed East Fife from 1963 until 1969 before assisting Eddie Turnbull at Aberdeen. Bonthrone was assistant manager when Aberdeen won the Scottish Cup in 1970. He was promoted to become the Aberdeen manager in 1971 after Turnbull moved to Hibernian.

Bonthrone managed the Dons from 1971 until his resignation in 1975. The club won the Drybrough Cup in 1971 just after he was appointed. He gave Willie Miller his debut, but had to contend with the high-profile departures of Martin Buchan and Joe Harper, which effectively broke up the team that had been successful under Turnbull.

After leaving Aberdeen, he became commercial manager with East Fife before retiring.
