= Bobby Waddell =

Scottish footballer (1939–2021)

Personal information
- Full name: Robert Waddell
- Date of birth: 5 September 1939
- Place of birth: Kirkcaldy, Scotland
- Date of death: 25 August 2021 (aged 81)
- Position: Centre forward

Youth career
- St Andrews Swifts

Senior career*
Years	Team	Apps	(Gls)
1959–1965	Dundee	60	(26)
1965–1966	Blackpool	28	(5)
1966–1967	Bradford Park Avenue	20	(3)
1967–1970	East Fife	82	(24)
1970–1971	Montrose	26	(5)
- Newburgh
Total		216	(63)
- * Club domestic league appearances and goals

Robert Waddell (5 September 1939 – 25 August 2021) was a Scottish footballer who played as a centre forward.

Waddell was part of the Dundee side that won the Scottish league championship in 1962. He also played for Blackpool, Bradford Park Avenue, East Fife and Montrose.
