= Bob Shankly =

Scottish footballer and manager

Personal information
- Full name: Robert Fleming Blyth Shankly
- Date of birth: 25 February 1910
- Place of birth: Glenbuck, Scotland
- Date of death: 5 May 1982 (aged 72)
- Positions: Centre half; forward

Senior career*
Years	Team	Apps	(Gls)
- Auchinleck Talbot
–1930	Glenbuck Cherrypickers		
1930–1932	Alloa Athletic	63	(14)
1932–1933	Tunbridge Wells Rangers		
1933–1946	Falkirk	215	(7)

International career
1937	Scottish League XI	1	(0)

Managerial career
- 1950–1957: Falkirk
- 1957–1959: Third Lanark
- 1959–1965: Dundee
- 1965–1969: Hibernian
- 1967: Toronto City
- 1970–1973: Stirling Albion
- * Club domestic league appearances and goals

Robert Fleming Blyth Shankly (25 February 1910 – 5 May 1982) was a Scottish professional football player and manager. He was an elder brother of Bill Shankly, the former Liverpool manager.

Shankly is considered one of Dundee's greatest managers for his achievements with the club, and has been inducted into the club's Hall of Fame.

== Playing career ==
Shankly was one of five brothers who all played football professionally, including Bill, who would become a Scottish international and manager of Liverpool. Bob began his career with junior club Auchinleck before moving to the local club Glenbuck Cherrypickers.

He then moved into the senior ranks with Alloa Athletic after being turned down by Ayr United, despite scoring a hat-trick of goals in a trial match. Shankly then played for English non-league team Tunbridge. He later played for Falkirk, although he had signed for Falkirk while unaware that Preston North End (where his brother Bill was then playing) wanted to sign him. He represented the Scottish League XI in 1937. Like many working-class men from Ayrshire at the time, he began working life as a miner (as did all his brothers), combining this job with football on a part-time basis. He married in 1936 and had two children, John (who became a civil engineer, but was offered the chance to become a professional footballer himself) and Margaret.

== Managerial career ==
It was as a football club manager that Shankly made his name. After retiring from playing, he had a spell as a coach of Stenhousemuir before managing Falkirk, Third Lanark, Dundee, Hibernian and Stirling Albion, where he eventually became a director. While manager of Dundee, he managed to guide his club to victory in the Scottish Football League championship of 1961–62, three points ahead of Rangers and to date the only time Dundee have won the league title. The following season, he guided Dundee to the semi-finals of the European Champions Cup, where they were defeated 5–2 on aggregate by AC Milan. Craig Brown later compared Shankly's achievements with Walter Smith, Jock Stein, Alex Ferguson and Jim McLean. Dundee made it to the 1964 Scottish Cup Final, but a Scottish Cup defeat by St Johnstone the following season prompted his departure.

Shankly resigned from Dundee in February 1965 to succeed Jock Stein as manager of Hibernian. Hibs reached a League Cup Final in April 1969, but lost heavily to Stein's Celtic. He temporarily retired and left Hibs later in 1969. He returned to football management with Stirling Albion, then became their general manager and a club director.

== Personal life ==
Shankly survived a major car accident in 1975, in which he, Jock Stein and another friend were seriously injured. He died from a heart attack at an SFA meeting on 5 May 1982. He was 72 years old, and his death came just under a year after that of his younger brother Bill, who had also died from a heart attack. A stand at Dens Park is named in Shankly's honour and he is a member of the Dundee hall of fame.

== Achievements ==
=== As a player ===
Falkirk

- Scottish League Second Division (1): 1935–36
- Stirlingshire Cup (2): 1934–35, 1938–39
- Falkirk Infirmary Shield (6): 1933–34, 1934–35, 1935–36, 1936–37, 1937–38, 1938–39
- Dewar Shield (1): 1938–39

=== As a manager ===
Falkirk

- Stirlingshire Cup (2): 1950–51, 1951–52

Dundee

- Scottish League First Division (1): 1961–62
- Scottish Cup runners-up: 1963-64
- European Cup semi-finalist: 1962-63

Stirling Albion

- Stirlingshire Cup (1): 1971–72

=== As an individual ===
- Dundee Hall of Fame
