= George McGeachie (footballer, born 1939) =

Scottish footballer

Personal information
- Full name: George McGeachie
- Date of birth: 9 September 1939 (age 87)
- Place of birth: Falkirk, Scotland
- Position: Left winger

Senior career*
| Years | Team | Apps | (Gls) |
| 1956–1963 | Dundee | 77 | (8) |
| 1964–1967 | Darlington | 119 | (9) |
| Total | | 196 | (17) |
- * Club domestic league appearances and goals

George McGeachie (born 9 September 1939) is a Scottish former footballer who played as a left winger in the Scottish Football League for Dundee and in the English Football League for Darlington in the 1950s and 1960s.

McGeachie was born in Falkirk, where he attended Falkirk High School. From there he signed for Dundee as a part-timer, combining football with acquiring a science degree and then teaching. He made his debut as a 17-year-old, and was able to establish himself as a regular in the team, but by the 1961–62 season, when Dundee won the league title for the first time, he had become a fringe member of the squad.

In 1963, McGeachie moved to the north-east of England to work for ICI. He also signed for Fourth Division club Darlington. He made his debut on 25 January 1964 in the club's record defeat, 10–0 against Doncaster Rovers, and went on to be part of the promotion-winning team of 1965–66. He had played regularly – 135 matches in all competitions in less than three years and ever-present in the promotion season – but suffered cartilage damage in October 1966 that put an end to his career.
