= Alan Cousin =

Scottish footballer (1938–2016)

Personal information
- Date of birth: 7 March 1938
- Place of birth: Alloa, Scotland
- Date of death: 20 September 2016 (aged 78)
- Position: Striker

Youth career
- Alloa Y.M

Senior career*
Years	Team	Apps	(Gls)
1955–1965	Dundee	288	(103)
1965–1969	Hibernian	84	(4)
1969–1970	Falkirk	14	(0)
Total		386	(107)

International career
1958	Scottish League XI	2	(1)
1958–1960	Scotland U23	3	(3)
1960–1962	SFL trial v SFA	2	(1)
- * Club domestic league appearances and goals

Alan Cousin (7 March 1938 – 20 September 2016) was a Scottish footballer, who played for Dundee, Hibernian, and Falkirk.

== Career ==
At the age of 16, Cousin played rugby in the mornings and football in the afternoons, for Alloa Y.M.C.A. He was noticed within a year of helping out the Central Scottish side and played for Scotland Under 16s, where as a centre forward, he was in the side that beat England 8–1.

Scouts from various clubs sought his skills, but it was Dundee manager Willie Thornton who succeeded in signing him. Cousin made his debut when first team regular George Merchant was injured and one month later, he scored his first goal for Dundee in a 5–1 friendly victory against Manchester United, who had just become the English champions.

After establishing a first-team place, Cousin attended St. Andrews University to study Greek and Latin for an Arts Degree, whilst combining this with his early professional footballing career. Often his training would involve running on the St. Andrews beach later made famous in the film Chariots Of Fire.

Cousin was Dundee's top goalscorer three consecutive seasons (1958 to 1960). He played in attack for Dundee alongside Alan Gilzean in a team considered by Bob Crampsey to be the best produced in Scotland since the Second World War. Dundee won the Scottish League championship in 1962 and then reached the semi-final of the European Cup in the following season. Cousin played in every match of the championship-winning season.

Cousin was dubbed the 'King of the double shuffle' because of his ability to repeatedly outwit opposing players, by stepping over the ball. He was inducted into the Dundee F.C. Hall Of Fame in a tribute dinner in 2011, to salute his contribution to football at the club.

Cousin was never booked or sent off in his career, which is remarkable, given the treatment meted out to strikers in those days.

Cousin began a teaching course in Dundee after completing his degree, before he took up the post of Classics teacher at his old school, Alloa Academy. He would take up teaching full-time after his football career, eventually becoming Deputy Rector at Lornshill Academy, until he retired in 1995.

Cousin died in September 2016, aged 78.
