= Andy Penman =

Scottish footballer (1943–1994)

Personal information
- Date of birth: 20 February 1943
- Place of birth: Rosyth, Fife, Scotland
- Date of death: 19 July 1994 (aged 51)
- Position: Midfielder

Senior career*
Years	Team	Apps	(Gls)
1958	Everton	0	(0)
1958–1967	Dundee	215	(100)
1967–1973	Rangers	101	(36)
1973–1976	Arbroath	79	(10)
1976–1979	Inverness Caledonian		
Total		395	(146)

International career
1960–1965	Scotland U23	4	(0)
1961	SFL trial v SFA	1	(0)
1960–1967	Scottish League XI	6	(3)
1966–1967	Scotland	4	(0)
- * Club domestic league appearances and goals

Andy Penman (20 February 1943 – 19 July 1994) was a Scottish professional footballer who played as a midfielder for Dundee, Rangers and Arbroath. Penman helped Dundee win the Scottish league championship in 1962. He made four appearances in full internationals for Scotland.

== Career ==
Penman started his career at Everton in 1958 as a 15 year old. He played for the Everton first team twice, against Liverpool in a Floodlit Challenge Trophy match and against a touring South African team. He returned to Scotland later that year with Dundee, and made his first league appearance just before his 16th birthday. Penman was part of the Dundee team that won the Scottish league championship in 1962, and reached the semi-final of the 1962–63 European Cup. He moved to Rangers in 1967 and played there for five seasons. Penman played in two Scottish Cup Finals for Rangers, both of which were lost to Celtic. He left Rangers in 1973 and joined Arbroath. Penman then played for Inverness Caledonian in the Highland League before retiring in 1979.

Penman made his debut international appearance for Scotland in a 3–0 defeat to the Netherlands on 11 May 1966. He made three further appearances during a 1967 overseas tour that the Scottish Football Association decided in October 2021 to reclassify as full internationals, which increased Penman's cap tally from one to four. He also represented the Scottish League XI six times.

== Legacy ==
Penman died in 1994, at the age of 51. There is a lounge at Dundee's Dens Park named in his honour.
