= Alex Hamilton (footballer, born 1936) =

Scottish footballer

Personal information
- Full name: Alexander William Hamilton
- Date of birth: 5 April 1936
- Place of birth: Armadale, West Lothian, Scotland
- Date of death: 24 July 1993 (aged 57)
- Place of death: Broughty Ferry, Dundee, Scotland
- Height: 5 ft 7 in (1.70 m)
- Position: Right back

Senior career*
Years	Team	Apps	(Gls)
1957–1966	Dundee	261	(1)
1967–1969	East London Celtic		
1970–1972	East London United		

International career
1961–1965	Scotland	24	(0)
1961–1965	Scottish League XI	8	(1)
1962–1964	SFA trial v SFL	2	(0)
- * Club domestic league appearances and goals

Alexander William Hamilton (5 April 1936 – 24 July 1993) was a Scottish footballer, who played for Dundee and the Scotland national team.

Hamilton, a right back, was signed for Dundee by manager Willie Thornton and made his league debut in a 7–1 win over Airdrieonians in 1957. He remained with Dundee for ten years, winning the League title in 1961–62 and reaching the Scottish Cup final in 1963–64.

During his time at Dens Park, Hamilton won 24 caps for the Scotland national team. He made his international debut in a 2–1 win over Wales in November 1961. In his 24 appearances for Scotland, Hamilton finished on the winning side on 13 occasions. His final appearance for Scotland was in a 2–1 defeat to Poland in October 1965. He also represented the Scottish League XI.

Hamilton was also a noted singer and was the frontman of a band comprising several of his Dundee teammates, including future Scotland manager Craig Brown. "Hammy and the Hamsters" success was restricted to the local Dundee area however, and they only released one record.

Hamilton left Dundee in 1967 to join Durban United in the South African soccer league known then as the National Football League (NFL). When Durban Spurs merged with Durban United to become Durban Spurs United, Hamilton - together with a number of other players that were surplus to the merged entity's requirements - joined the then newly-promoted East London Celtic.

He played with distinction for East London Celtic which later became East London United. Always colourful and controversial, one of his more memorable games was when East London Celtic thrashed Cape Town City 6–3. Towards the end of the game, with Cape Town City players back-pedalling furiously in fear of conceding a seventh goal, Alex Hamilton - with the ball at his feet - decided to show his disdain for the opposition by sitting down on the ball. He later apologised for these actions.

East London Celtic, and later as East London United, were something of a bogey side for one of the NFL's glamour teams, Cape Town City. In one memorable game at the Border Rugby Union stadium in East London, despite being packed with stars such as George Eastham, Cape Town City lost once again. Eastham was marked out of the game by Arthur Barker, the younger brother of Clive Barker who as coach led the South African national team - Bafana Bafana - to African Cup glory in 1986.

Hamilton later managed junior side Dundee Violet before returning to South Africa briefly during which time he managed East London United.

Hamilton returned to Dundee in 1988 and was back at Dens Park for a spell running the club's lottery. Hamilton died at his home in Broughty Ferry on 24 July 1993, at the age of 57.
