= Hugh Robertson (footballer, born 1939) =

Scottish footballer and manager

Personal information
- Full name: Hugh Robertson
- Date of birth: 29 November 1939
- Place of birth: Auchinleck, Scotland
- Date of death: 12 March 2010 (aged 70)
- Position: Winger

Senior career*
Years	Team	Apps	(Gls)
1957–1965	Dundee	223	(48)
1965–1971	Dunfermline Athletic	172	(49)
1971–1973	Arbroath	40	(5)
Total		435	(102)

International career
1961	Scotland	1	(0)
1961–1962	Scotland U23	2	(0)

Managerial career
- 1981–1983: Herfølge
- * Club domestic league appearances and goals

Hugh Robertson (29 November 1939 – 12 March 2010) was a Scottish association football player and manager. He played as a winger for the Dundee team that won the Scottish league championship in 1962, and the Dunfermline side that won the 1968 Scottish Cup. He played 40 games for Arbroath, including their promotion from Division 2 in 1971–2. He later managed Danish club Herfølge.

Robertson represented the Scotland national football team once, in a vital 1962 FIFA World Cup qualifying match against Czechoslovakia. Injuries to Davie Wilson and Alex Scott meant that Robertson and Ralph Brand were brought in for the match, which Scotland had to win to qualify. Despite two goals by Ian St. John, Scotland lost 4–2 after extra time.

Hugh was 1st team coach of Dalry FC season 94–95

Robertson died at his home on 12 March 2010.
