= Alan Gilzean =

Scottish footballer (1938–2018)

Personal information
- Full name: Alan John Gilzean
- Date of birth: 22 October 1938
- Place of birth: Perth, Scotland
- Date of death: 8 July 2018 (aged 79)
- Place of death: Weston-super-Mare, Somerset, England
- Height: 6 ft 0 in (1.83 m)
- Position: Striker

Senior career*
Years	Team	Apps	(Gls)
1957–1964	Dundee	190	(169)
1964–1974	Tottenham Hotspur	343	(93)
1974–1975	Highlands Park		
Total		533+	(262+)

International career
1960–1964	Scottish League XI	3	(1)
1961–1962	Scotland under-23	3	(0)
1962	SFA trial v SFL	1	(2)
1963–1971	Scotland	22	(12)

Managerial career
- 1975–1976: Stevenage Athletic
- * Club domestic league appearances and goals

Alan John Gilzean (/ɡɪlziːn/; 22 October 1938 – 8 July 2018) was a Scottish professional footballer, active from 1955 to 1975. A striker, Gilzean played most prominently for Dundee and Tottenham Hotspur, and also appeared in 22 international games for Scotland. He helped Dundee win the Scottish league championship in 1961–62 and Tottenham win the FA Cup in 1967, two League Cups (1971 and 1973) and the 1971–72 UEFA Cup

== Playing career ==
=== Dundee ===
Gilzean began his career with local side Coupar Angus Juniors, before signing provisional forms with Dundee in January 1956 as a 17-year-old amateur. He played once for their youth team Dundee Violet, but then played again for Coupar Angus while working as a despatch clerk for a carpet manufacturer in Perth. He signed professional forms with Dundee in February 1957, but then had a spell in Hampshire while he underwent National Service in the Royal Army Service Corps. Gilzean made his competitive debut for Dundee in August 1959, and then became a key part of a successful side. He scored 169 goals in 190 appearances for Dundee in the Scottish top flight as Dundee won the Scottish league championship in 1961–62 and reached the semi-finals of the 1962–63 European Cup. In 2009 Gilzean was one of the first inductees in the Dens Park club's Hall of fame.

=== Tottenham Hotspur ===
Gilzean joined Tottenham Hotspur in December 1964, moving for a transfer fee of £72,500. He made his first appearance for Tottenham a week later, in a home fixture against Everton.

Gilzean enjoyed a glittering career as a Tottenham player, while he also changed his style of play from being the main goalscorer to being an intelligent and creative forward. He formed an effective goal-scoring partnership alongside crowd favourite Jimmy Greaves, and together they were referred to by fans as the "G-Men". A notable match he was involved in was the 4th round FA Cup in 1966 match against Burnley when he scored a hat-trick, and won the game 4–3 with a late goal. He was a member of the 1967 FA Cup Final winning team. Gilzean continued to be a regular first-team player after the arrival of Martin Chivers in early 1968 from Southampton.

After strike-partner Greaves moved to West Ham United in March 1970, Gilzean and Chivers formed a new and equally successful goalscoring partnership. This contributed greatly to Tottenham's cup triumphs in the first half of the decade, winning the League Cup in 1971, an all-English 1972 UEFA Cup Final against Wolverhampton Wanderers, and a second League Cup victory in 1973. He earned the moniker "The King of White Hart Lane" while at Spurs.

The 1973–74 season was Gilzean's last as a professional footballer as Spurs lost the UEFA Cup final to Dutch side Feyenoord Rotterdam. Tottenham awarded Gilzean with a testimonial match, played against Red Star Belgrade in November 1974, to recognise his ten years of service as a Tottenham player.

=== Highlands Park ===
Following his retirement from Tottenham, Gilzean played in South Africa for three months with Highlands Park.

=== International career ===
Gilzean made his debut for Scotland in November 1963, in a 6–1 win against Norway. He had previously represented his country at Under-23 level and the Scottish League XI. He received four more international caps in the following twelve months while playing for Dundee. He also scored twice for a Scotland Select XI against Tottenham Hotspur in a November 1964 memorial match for Tottenham and Scotland player John White, who had died in tragic circumstances earlier that year.

Gilzean represented Scotland seventeen times during his Spurs career. In total he scored 12 goals in 22 full international appearances for Scotland, between November 1963 and April 1971.

== Style of play ==
A prolific goalscorer during his time at Dundee, Gilzean continued to be a prolific goalscorer at Tottenham while also providing chances for his strike partners Jimmy Greaves and Martin Chivers. Gilzean was a natural header of the ball and possessed great technique. Greaves described Gilzean as the finest player he ever played with and as a "blood brother".

Many Tottenham supporters who watched him play in the 1960s and 1970s have compared 21st-century Tottenham forward Dimitar Berbatov to Gilzean.

== Management career ==
Gilzean returned to England after his spell in South Africa, to become manager of Stevenage Athletic who he managed for one season from 1975 to 1976.

== Personal life ==
Gilzean stated, whilst playing, that he disliked football and had no intention of furthering his career after playing. He later worked for a transport company in Enfield, only a short distance from White Hart Lane.

When journalist Hunter Davies surveyed the Tottenham Hotspur squad in 1972, Gilzean said that he was supportive of the Conservative Party. His son Ian also became a professional football player. Gilzean died on 8 July 2018, having been diagnosed as suffering from a brain tumour a few weeks earlier.

== Career statistics ==
=== International goals ===
Scores and results list Scotland's goal tally first, score column indicates score after each Gilzean goal.

List of international goals scored by Alan Gilzean
No.	Date	Venue	Opponent	Score	Result	Competition
1	11 April 1964	Hampden Park, Glasgow	England	1–0	1–0	1963–64 British Home Championship
2	12 May 1964	Niedersachsen Stadion, Hannover	West Germany	1–2	2–2	Friendly
3	12 May 1964	Niedersachsen Stadion, Hannover	West Germany	2–2	2–2	Friendly
4	25 November 1964	Hampden Park, Glasgow	Northern Ireland	2–1	3–2	1964–65 British Home Championship
5	2 October 1965	Windsor Park, Belfast	Northern Ireland	1–0	2–3	1965–66 British Home Championship
6	2 October 1965	Windsor Park, Belfast	Northern Ireland	2–2	2–3	1965–66 British Home Championship
7	22 November 1967	Hampden Park, Glasgow	Wales	1–0	3–2	1967–68 British Home Championship / UEFA Euro 1968 qualifying
8	22 November 1967	Hampden Park, Glasgow	Wales	2–2	3–2	1967–68 British Home Championship / UEFA Euro 1968 qualifying
9	17 December 1968	Lefkosia, Nicosia	Cyprus	1–0	5–0	1970 FIFA World Cup qualification
10	17 December 1968	Lefkosia, Nicosia	Cyprus	3–0	5–0	1970 FIFA World Cup qualification
11	3 May 1969	The Racecourse Ground, Wrexham	Wales	3–2	5–3	1968–69 British Home Championship
12	22 October 1969	Volksparkstadion, Hamburg	West Germany	2–2	2–3	1970 FIFA World Cup qualification

== Honours ==
Dundee

- Scottish League Division One: 1961–62

Tottenham Hotspur

- FA Cup: 1966–67
- Football League Cup: 1970–71, 1972–73
- FA Charity Shield: 1967 (shared)
- UEFA Cup: 1971–72

Individual

- Inducted to the Scottish Football Hall of Fame: 2009
- Inducted to the Dundee FC Hall of Fame: 2009
- Inducted to the Tottenham Hotspur Hall of Fame: 2013
