= 1961–62 in Scottish football =

Division One champions
- Dundee

Division Two champions
- Clyde

Scottish Cup winners
- Rangers

League Cup winners
- Rangers

Junior Cup winners
- Kirkintilloch Rob Roy

Teams in Europe
- Dunfermline Athletic, Heart of Midlothian, Hibernian, Rangers

Scotland national team
- 1962 BHC, 1962 World Cup qualification

The 1961–62 season was the 89th season of competitive football in Scotland and the 65th season of the Scottish Football League.

== Scottish League Division One ==
Dundee had an excellent start to the season, including a 5–1 win away to Rangers, and having a seemingly invincible lead by Christmas. A poor run of form in the new year, including a run of three successive defeats, allowed Rangers to move to the top of the table. Rangers themselves lost to Dundee United and Aberdeen in the closing weeks, allowing Dundee to take the title with a 3–0 win at St Johnstone on the last day of the season.

Pos	Team	Pld	W	D	L	GF	GA	GR	Pts	Qualification or relegation
1	Dundee (C)	34	25	4	5	80	46	1.739	54	Qualified for the European Cup
2	Rangers	34	22	7	5	84	31	2.710	51	Qualified for the Cup Winners' Cup
3	Celtic	34	19	8	7	81	37	2.189	46	Invited for the Inter-Cities Fairs Cup
4	Dunfermline Athletic	34	19	5	10	77	46	1.674	43	Invited for the Inter-Cities Fairs Cup
5	Kilmarnock	34	16	10	8	74	58	1.276	42	
6	Hearts	34	16	6	12	55	49	1.122	38	
7	Partick Thistle	34	16	3	15	60	55	1.091	35	
8	Hibernian	34	14	5	15	58	72	0.806	33	Invited for the Inter-Cities Fairs Cup
9	Motherwell	34	13	6	15	65	62	1.048	32	
10	Dundee United	34	13	6	15	70	71	0.986	32	
11	Third Lanark	34	13	5	16	59	60	0.983	31	
12	Aberdeen	34	10	9	15	60	73	0.822	29	
13	Raith Rovers	34	10	7	17	51	73	0.699	27	
14	Falkirk	34	11	4	19	45	68	0.662	26	
15	Airdrieonians	34	9	7	18	57	78	0.731	25	
16	St Mirren	34	10	5	19	52	80	0.650	25	
17	St Johnstone (R)	34	9	7	18	35	61	0.574	25	Relegated to the Second Division
18	Stirling Albion (R)	34	6	6	22	34	76	0.447	18	Relegated to the Second Division

Source: RSSSF
(C) Champions; (R) Relegated

Champions: Dundee
Relegated: St Johnstone, Stirling Albion

== Scottish League Division Two ==
Pos	Team	Pld	W	D	L	GF	GA	GD	Pts	Promotion or relegation
1	Clyde	36	25	4	7	108	47	+61	54	Promotion to the 1962–63 First Division
2	Queen of the South	36	24	5	7	78	33	+45	53	Promotion to the 1962–63 First Division
3	Morton	36	19	6	11	78	64	+14	44	
4	Alloa Athletic	36	17	8	11	92	78	+14	42	
5	Montrose	36	15	11	10	63	50	+13	41	
6	Arbroath	36	17	7	12	66	59	+7	41	
7	Stranraer	36	14	11	11	61	62	−1	39	
8	Berwick Rangers	36	16	6	14	83	70	+13	38	
9	Ayr United	36	15	8	13	71	63	+8	38	
10	East Fife	36	15	7	14	60	59	+1	37	
11	East Stirlingshire	36	15	4	17	70	81	−11	34	
12	Queen's Park	36	12	9	15	64	62	+2	33	
13	Hamilton Academical	36	14	5	17	78	79	−1	33	
14	Cowdenbeath	36	11	9	16	65	77	−12	31	
15	Stenhousemuir	36	13	5	18	69	86	−17	31	
16	Forfar Athletic	36	11	8	17	68	76	−8	30	
17	Dumbarton	36	9	10	17	49	66	−17	28	
18	Albion Rovers	36	10	5	21	42	74	−32	25	
19	Brechin City	36	5	2	29	44	123	−79	12	

Source: "1961-1962 Second Division - SPFL Archive". SPFL.

Promoted: Clyde, Queen of the South

== Cup honours ==
Competition	Winner	Score	Runner-up
Scottish Cup 1961–62	Rangers	2 – 0	St Mirren
League Cup 1961–62	Rangers	3 – 1 (rep.)	Heart of Midlothian
Junior Cup	Kirkintilloch Rob Roy	1 – 0 (rep.)	Renfrew

== Other honours ==
=== National ===
Competition	Winner	Score	Runner-up
Scottish Qualifying Cup – North	Keith	4 – 3 *	Inverness Caledonian
Scottish Qualifying Cup – South	Duns	7 – 2 *	Eyemouth United

=== County ===
Competition	Winner	Score	Runner-up
Aberdeenshire Cup	Deveronvale		
Ayrshire Cup	Kilmarnock	7 – 2 *	Ayr United
East of Scotland Shield	Hearts	3 – 1	Hibernian
Fife Cup	Raith Rovers	4 – 0 *	East Fife
Forfarshire Cup	Montrose	2 – 1	Arbroath
Glasgow Cup	Celtic	3 – 2 †	Third Lanark
Lanarkshire Cup	Motherwell	7 – 1	Albion Rovers
Renfrewshire Cup	Morton	4 – 3 *	St Mirren
Stirlingshire Cup	East Stirling	3 – 1	Stenhousemuir

^{*} – aggregate over two legs
† – replay

=== Highland League ===
Top Three
Pos	Team	Pld	W	D	L	GF	GA	GD	Pts
1	Keith	28	22	2	4	93	29	+64	46
2	Elgin City	28	18	4	6	91	46	+45	40
3	Deveronvale	28	16	4	8	87	48	+39	36

== Scotland national team ==
Date	Venue	Opponents	Score	Competition	Scotland scorer(s)
26 September 1961	Hampden Park, Glasgow (H)	Czechoslovakia	3–2	WCQG8	Denis Law (2), Ian St John
7 October 1961	Windsor Park, Belfast (A)	Northern Ireland	6–1	BHC	Alex Scott (3), Ralph Brand (2), Davie Wilson
8 November 1961	Hampden Park, Glasgow (H)	Wales	2–0	BHC	Ian St John (2)
29 November 1961	Heysel Stadium, Brussels	Czechoslovakia	2–4 (a.e.t.)	WCQPO	Ian St John (2)
14 April 1962	Hampden Park, Glasgow (H)	England	2–0	BHC	Davie Wilson, Eric Caldow (pen.)
2 May 1962	Hampden Park, Glasgow (H)	Uruguay	2–3	Friendly	Jim Baxter, Ralph Brand

- 1962 British Home Championship – Winners

Key:

- (H) = Home match
- (A) = Away match
- WCQG8 = World Cup qualifying – Group 8
- WCQPO = World Cup qualifying – play-off match
- BHC = British Home Championship
