= 1974–75 Dundee F.C. season =

Dundee
1974–75 season
- Manager: Davie White
- Division One: 6th
- Scottish Cup: Semi-finals
- League Cup: Group stage
- UEFA Cup: First round
- Top goalscorer: League: Jocky Scott (8); All: Jocky Scott (12)
Home colours

The 1974–75 season was the 73rd season in which Dundee competed at a Scottish national level, playing in Division One, where the club would finish in 6th place. Domestically, Dundee would also compete in both the Scottish League Cup and the Scottish Cup, where they would be eliminated in the group stage of the League Cup, and get knocked out by Celtic in semi-finals of the Scottish Cup for the third straight year. Dundee would also compete in the UEFA Cup, where they would be knocked out by R.W.D. Molenbeek in the 1st round.

== Scottish Division One ==
Statistics provided by Dee Archive.

Match day	Date	Opponent	H/A	Score	Dundee scorer(s)	Attendance
1	31 August	Airdrieonians	A	1–0	Lambie	5,000
2	7 September	Aberdeen	H	0–1		6,396
3	14 September	Dundee United	A	0–3		10,857
4	21 September	Arbroath	H	0–1		4,672
5	28 September	Motherwell	A	1–0	Robinson	3,939
6	5 October	Hibernian	H	0–0		8,252
7	12 October	Kilmarnock	A	1–1	Robinson	6,000
8	19 October	Greenock Morton	H	3–0	J. Scott (2) (pen.), I. Scott	4,578
9	26 October	Dunfermline Athletic	A	1–3	Robinson	4,500
10	2 November	Clyde	H	4–1	J. Scott (2) (pen.), Hutchinson, Hoggan	3,434
11	9 November	Rangers	A	0–1		26,744
12	16 November	St Johnstone	H	4–0	Hutchinson (2), Stewart, Robinson	5,933
13	23 November	Dumbarton	A	0–0		2,900
14	30 November	Partick Thistle	H	1–0	Hoggan	4,495
15	7 December	Ayr United	A	1–2	Hutchinson	3,900
16	14 December	Celtic	H	0–6		14,901
17	21 December	Heart of Midlothian	A	0–0		10,180
18	28 December	Airdrieonians	H	1–0	Gordon	5,500
19	1 January	Aberdeen	A	0–4		12,000
20	4 January	Dundee United	H	2–0	Wallace, Anderson	16,184
21	11 January	Arbroath	A	2–2	Gordon, Hutchinson	4,292
22	1 February	Hibernian	A	1–2	Anderson	9,788
23	8 February	Kilmarnock	H	4–1	Wallace (2), Gordon, J. Scott (pen.)	4,835
24	10 February	Motherwell	H	4–1	I. Scott (2), J. Scott, Wallace	5,347
25	22 February	Greenock Morton	A	2–1	Wallace (2)	3,000
26	1 March	Dunfermline Athletic	H	2–0	Ford, Gordon	4,491
27	15 March	Rangers	H	1–2	Hutchinson	22,738
28	18 March	Clyde	A	1–0	Robinson	2,500
29	22 March	St Johnstone	A	1–3	Smith (o.g.)	4,400
30	29 March	Dumbarton	H	2–1	Stewart, Hutchinson	4,411
31	5 April	Partick Thistle	A	2–2	Gordon, Hoggan	3,500
32	12 April	Ayr United	H	2–3	J. Scott, B. Wilson	3,599
33	19 April	Celtic	A	2–1	Robinson, Hoggan	12,355
34	23 April	Heart of Midlothian	H	2–0	Anderson, J. Scott	4,949

=== League table ===
Pos	Team	Pld	W	D	L	GF	GA	GD	Pts	Qualification
4	Dundee United	34	19	7	8	72	43	+29	45	Qualification to UEFA Cup First round
5	Aberdeen	34	16	9	9	66	43	+23	41	
6	Dundee	34	16	6	12	48	42	+6	38	
7	Ayr United	34	14	8	12	50	61	−11	36	
8	Hearts	34	11	13	10	47	52	−5	35	

Source: Soccerbase and League Tables

== Scottish League Cup ==
Statistics provided by Dee Archive.

=== Group 2 ===
Match day	Date	Opponent	H/A	Score	Dundee scorer(s)	Attendance
1	10 August	St Johnstone	A	1–2	Duncan	4,000
2	14 August	Hibernian	H	2–1	J. Scott, Spalding (o.g.)	6,829
3	17 August	Rangers	H	0–2		18,548
4	21 August	Hibernian	A	2–4	I. Scott, Duncan	13,913
5	24 August	Rangers	A	0–4		35,000
6	28 August	St Johnstone	H	6–1	Hutchinson, I. Scott (2), Ford, J. Scott (2) (pen.)	2,903

==== Group 2 table ====
Team	Pld	W	D	L	GF	GA	GD	Pts
Hibernian	6	5	0	1	16	6	+10	10
Rangers	6	4	0	2	16	9	+7	8
Dundee	6	2	0	4	11	14	−3	4
St Johnstone	6	1	0	5	9	23	−14	2

== Scottish Cup ==
Statistics provided by Dee Archive.

Match day	Date	Opponent	H/A	Score	Dundee scorer(s)	Attendance
3rd round	25 January	Clyde	A	1–0	Gordon	4,500
4th round	15 February	St Johnstone	A	1–0	Anderson	11,840
Quarter-finals	8 March	Heart of Midlothian	A	1–1	Wallace	22,197
QF replay	12 March	Heart of Midlothian	H	3–2	Stewart, Hutchinson, Robinson	16,228
Semi-finals	2 April	Celtic	N	0–1		40,720

== UEFA Cup ==
Match day	Date	Opponent	H/A	Score	Dundee scorer(s)	Attendance
1st round, 1st leg	18 September	(Belgium) R.W.D. Molenbeek	A	0–1		15,000
1st round, 2nd leg	2 October	(Belgium) R.W.D. Molenbeek	H	2–4	Duncan, J. Scott	12,000
Molenbeek won 5–2 on aggregate

== Player statistics ==
Statistics provided by Dee Archive

No.	Pos	Nat	Player	Total		Division One		Scottish Cup		League Cup		UEFA Cup	
No.	Pos	Nat	Player	Apps	Goals	Apps	Goals	Apps	Goals	Apps	Goals	Apps	Goals
	GK	(Scotland) SCO	Thomson Allan	47	0	34	0	5	0	6	0	2	0
	DF	(Scotland) SCO	Ian Anderson	22	4	13+2	3	5	1	0+1	0	0+1	0
	DF	(Scotland) SCO	Alex Caldwell	25	0	19+3	0	0	0	1	0	2	0
	FW	(Scotland) SCO	John Duncan	9	3	4	0	0	0	3+1	2	1	1
	MF	(Scotland) SCO	Bobby Ford	40	2	28	1	5	0	6	1	1	0
	DF	(Scotland) SCO	Tommy Gemmell	38	0	25	0	5	0	4+2	0	2	0
	FW	(Scotland) SCO	Alan Gordon	19	6	13+3	5	2+1	1	0	0	0	0
	FW	(Scotland) SCO	Wilson Hoggan	30	4	25	4	5	0	0	0	0	0
	MF	(Scotland) SCO	Bobby Hutchinson	34	9	21+2	7	2+1	1	6	1	2	0
	DF	(Scotland) SCO	Davie Johnston	34	0	22+3	0	1+1	0	4+1	0	2	0
	FW	(Scotland) SCO	Derek Laing	3	0	1	0	0+1	0	1	0	0	0
	FW	(Scotland) SCO	Duncan Lambie	3	1	1+2	1	0	0	0	0	0	0
	DF	(Scotland) SCO	Iain Phillip	23	0	17	0	0	0	4	0	2	0
	MF	(Scotland) SCO	Bobby Robinson	46	7	33+1	6	5	1	5	0	2	0
	FW	(Scotland) SCO	Ian Scott	23	6	7+8	3	1	0	3+3	3	1	0
	FW	(Scotland) SCO	Jocky Scott	45	12	32+1	8	4	0	6	3	2	1
	FW	(Scotland) SCO	Eric Sinclair	1	0	1	0	0	0	0	0	0	0
	DF	(Scotland) SCO	George Stewart	40	3	28	2	5	1	6	0	1	0
	MF	(Scotland) SCO	Gordon Strachan	2	0	1	0	0	0	1	0	0	0
	FW	(Scotland) SCO	Gordon Wallace	20	7	13+2	6	5	1	0	0	0	0
	DF	(Scotland) SCO	Bobby Wilson	46	1	33	1	5	0	6	0	2	0
	FW	(Scotland) SCO	Jimmy Wilson	11	0	3+3	0	0	0	4	0	0+1	0

== See also ==
- List of Dundee F.C. seasons
