= 1973–74 Dundee F.C. season =

Dundee
1973–74 season
- Manager: Davie White
- Scottish Division One: 5th
- Scottish Cup: Semi-finals
- League Cup: Winners
- UEFA Cup: First round
- Top goalscorer: League: Jocky Scott (22); All: Jocky Scott (29)
Home colours

The 1973–74 season was the 72nd season in which Dundee competed at a Scottish national level, playing in Division One, where the club would finish in 5th place for the fourth consecutive season. Domestically, Dundee would also compete in both the Scottish League Cup and the Scottish Cup, where they would get knocked out by Celtic in the semi-finals of the Scottish Cup for the second straight year, but would defeat them to win the club's third League Cup. Despite the issues such as a miners' strike and blizzards causing attendances for games to be uncharacteristically low, a Gordon Wallace goal would give Dundee its fifth major title. Dundee would also compete in the UEFA Cup, where they would be knocked out by FC Twente in the 1st round.

== Scottish Division One ==
Statistics provided by Dee Archive.

Match day	Date	Opponent	H/A	Score	Dundee scorer(s)	Attendance
1	1 September	Falkirk	H	4–0	J. Scott (2), Wallace, Lambie	4,500
2	8 September	Aberdeen	A	0–0		9,517
3	15 September	Dundee United	H	0–1		12,092
4	22 September	Heart of Midlothian	A	2–2	Duncan, Lambie	13,348
5	29 September	East Fife	H	0–1		3,483
6	6 October	Partick Thistle	A	0–1		3,500
7	13 October	Celtic	A	0–1		17,434
8	20 October	Arbroath	A	4–2	Wallace, B. Wilson, J. Scott, Robinson	3,120
9	27 October	Ayr United	H	2–1	Duncan, J. Scott (pen.)	5,611
10	3 November	St Johnstone	A	4–1	J. Wilson, Wallace (2), Duncan	3,800
11	10 November	Dumbarton	H	2–1	Wallace (2)	4,465
12	17 November	Hibernian	A	1–2	Wallace	11,348
13	24 November	Dunfermline Athletic	H	1–5	J. Scott	3,550
14	22 December	Motherwell	H	0–1		6,000
15	29 December	Falkirk	A	3–3	J. Wilson, J. Scott, Lambie	2,500
16	1 January	Aberdeen	H	1–1	J. Wilson	9,451
17	5 January	Dundee United	A	2–1	Duncan (2)	12,087
18	19 January	East Fife	A	3–0	J. Scott (3)	2,927
19	3 February	Partick Thistle	H	4–1	Robinson, Lambie, Duncan, J. Scott	7,526
20	10 February	Celtic	A	2–1	Lambie, Duncan	38,734
21	23 February	Arbroath	H	5–2	J. Scott (4) (pen.), Lambie	7,676
22	2 March	Ayr United	A	2–4	J. Scott (pen.), Gemmell	6,500
23	30 March	Dunfermline Athletic	A	5–1	J. Scott (pen.), Ford, J. Wilson, Pringle, Wallace	4,000
24	6 April	Greenock Morton	H	2–1	J. Scott, Wallace	4,000
25	10 April	Hibernian	H	1–3	J. Scott	7,398
26	13 April	Rangers	A	2–1	J. Scott (2)	23,000
27	17 April	Clyde	A	2–0	Duncan, Wallace	1,000
28	20 April	Clyde	H	6–1	Robinson, Wallace (2), Duncan (2), J. Scott (pen.)	4,027
29	22 April	St Johnstone	H	2–2	Wallace, Duncan	5,184
30	27 April	Motherwell	A	2–2	Wallace, J. Scott	3,902
31	29 April	Rangers	H	2–3	Duncan (2)	10,578
32	3 May	Greenock Morton	A	1–0	Wallace	3,100
33	6 May	Heart of Midlothian	H	0–0		5,056
34	10 May	Dumbarton	A	0–2		1,000

=== League table ===
Scottish Division One
- Season: 1973–74
- Champions: Celtic; 29th title
- Relegated: East Fife; Falkirk

The 1973–74 Scottish Division One was won by Celtic by four points over nearest rival Hibernian. East Fife and Falkirk finished 17th and 18th respectively and were relegated to the 1974–75 Second Division.

This was Celtic's ninth title in a row, a record that would be equalled by Rangers in the 1996–97 season and again by Celtic themselves in 2019–20.

== Table ==
Pos	Team	Pld	W	D	L	GF	GA	GD	Pts	Qualification or relegation
1	Celtic	34	23	7	4	82	27	+55	53	Champion
2	Hibernian	34	20	9	5	75	42	+33	49	
3	Rangers	34	21	6	7	67	34	+33	48	
4	Aberdeen	34	13	16	5	46	26	+20	42	
5	Dundee	34	16	7	11	67	48	+19	39	
6	Heart of Midlothian	34	14	10	10	54	43	+11	38	
7	Ayr United	34	15	8	11	44	40	+4	38	
8	Dundee United	34	15	7	12	55	51	+4	37	1974–75 European Cup Winners' Cup First round
9	Motherwell	34	14	7	13	45	40	+5	35	
10	Dumbarton	34	11	7	16	43	58	−15	29	
11	Partick Thistle	34	9	10	15	33	46	−13	28	
12	St Johnstone	34	9	10	15	41	60	−19	28	
13	Arbroath	34	10	7	17	52	69	−17	27	
14	Morton	34	8	10	16	37	49	−12	26	
15	Clyde	34	8	9	17	29	65	−36	25	
16	Dunfermline Athletic	34	8	8	18	43	65	−22	24	
17	East Fife	34	9	6	19	26	51	−25	24	Relegated to 1974–75 Second Division
18	Falkirk	34	4	14	16	33	58	−25	22	Relegated to 1974–75 Second Division

Source: Soccerbase and League Tables

== Results ==
Home \ Away	ABE	ARB	AYR	CEL	CLY	DUM	DND	DNU	DNF	EFI	FAL	HOM	HIB	MOR	MOT	PAR	RAN	STJ
Aberdeen		2–2	2–1	0–0	1–1	3–0	0–0	3–1	0–0	2–0	6–0	3–1	1–1	0–0	0–0	2–0	1–1	0–1
Arbroath	1–3		1–1	1–2	1–2	2–1	2–4	1–2	3–1	1–2	0–0	2–3	3–2	2–1	0–2	0–3	1–2	3–1
Ayr United	0–0	1–2		0–1	2–2	0–1	4–2	1–1	3–1	1–0	1–0	2–1	1–1	2–1	1–0	1–0	0–1	3–2
Celtic	2–0	1–0	4–0		5–0	3–3	1–2	3–3	6–0	4–2	6–0	1–0	1–1	1–1	2–0	7–0	1–0	3–0
Clyde	1–3	3–2	1–3	0–2		0–3	0–2	1–2	1–0	2–0	0–0	2–0	1–1	0–2	0–3	1–0	0–2	0–1
Dumbarton	0–1	5–2	0–2	0–2	1–1		2–0	1–2	1–0	1–1	1–5	0–1	3–3	1–0	3–0	2–0	0–2	2–1
Dundee	1–1	5–2	2–1	0–1	6–1	2–1		0–1	1–5	0–1	4–0	0–0	1–3	2–1	0–1	4–1	2–3	2–2
Dundee United	0–3	3–1	2–1	0–2	4–0	6–0	1–2		0–1	0–0	2–1	3–3	1–4	4–2	0–1	1–1	1–3	2–0
Dunfermline Athletic	0–0	1–1	0–4	2–3	2–3	3–2	1–5	2–3		0–1	4–0	2–3	2–3	1–1	2–4	1–1	2–2	3–1
East Fife	2–2	0–2	0–1	1–6	1–0	0–1	0–3	0–2	0–1		1–2	0–0	0–3	0–1	1–0	2–1	0–3	1–2
Falkirk	1–3	2–2	1–1	1–1	3–0	2–3	3–3	0–1	0–1	1–1		0–2	0–0	1–1	1–1	0–0	0–0	1–1
Heart of Midlothian	0–0	4–0	0–1	1–3	0–0	0–0	2–2	1–1	3–0	2–2	2–1		4–1	0–2	2–0	3–1	2–4	0–2
Hibernian	3–1	2–1	4–2	2–4	5–0	3–0	2–1	3–1	1–1	2–1	2–0	3–1		5–0	1–0	2–1	3–1	3–3
Morton	2–0	1–1	1–2	0–0	2–2	3–1	0–1	0–2	1–2	1–0	0–3	2–3	0–3		4–3	0–0	2–3	1–1
Motherwell	0–0	3–4	2–0	3–2	0–0	2–0	2–2	4–0	1–0	3–1	2–1	2–2	1–1	1–0		1–2	1–4	0–1
Partick Thistle	2–0	2–3	3–0	2–0	1–3	0–0	1–0	2–1	1–1	0–1	2–2	1–3	1–0	0–0	1–0		0–1	0–1
Rangers	1–1	2–3	0–0	0–1	4–0	3–1	1–2	3–1	3–0	0–1	2–1	0–3	4–0	1–0	2–1	1–1		5–1
St Johnstone	1–2	0–0	1–1	2–1	1–1	3–3	1–4	1–1	3–1	1–3	2–0	0–2	0–2	1–4	0–1	2–2	1–3	

Legend: Blue = home team win; Yellow = draw; Red = away team win.

== Scottish League Cup ==
Statistics provided by Dee Archive.

=== Group 3 ===
Match day	Date	Opponent	H/A	Score	Dundee scorer(s)	Attendance
1	11 August	St Johnstone	H	1–0	B. Wilson	6,400
2	15 August	Partick Thistle	A	3–0	Gray, Anderson, J. Scott	6,000
3	18 August	Heart of Midlothian	H	2–1	Wallace, J. Scott	8,052
4	22 August	Partick Thistle	H	4–0	J. Scott, Gray, Wallace (2)	6,000
5	25 August	Heart of Midlothian	A	0–0		13,414
6	29 August	St Johnstone	A	1–1	Wallace	6,000

==== Group 3 table ====
Team	Pld	W	D	L	GF	GA	GD	Pts
Dundee	6	4	2	0	11	2	+9	10
St Johnstone	6	3	1	2	12	9	+3	7
Heart of Midlothian	6	2	2	2	8	5	+3	6
Partick Thistle	6	0	1	5	2	17	−15	1

=== Knockout stage ===
Match day	Date	Opponent	H/A	Score	Dundee scorer(s)	Attendance
2nd round, 1st leg	12 September	Dunfermline Athletic	A	3–2	J. Scott, Gray, Lambie	6,000
2nd round, 2nd leg	10 October	Dunfermline Athletic	H	2–2	B. Wilson, Wallace	4,868
Dundee win 5–4 on aggregate
Quarter-finals, 1st leg	31 October	Clyde	H	1–0	Duncan	4,609
Quarter-finals, 2nd leg	21 November	Clyde	A	2–2	J. Wilson, Wallace	5,000
Dundee win 3–2 on aggregate
Semi-finals	28 November	Kilmarnock	N	1–0	Gemmell	4,682
Final	15 December	Celtic	N	1–0	Wallace 76'	27,924

== Scottish Cup ==
Statistics provided by Dee Archive.

Match day	Date	Opponent	H/A	Score	Dundee scorer(s)	Attendance
3rd round	27 January	Aberdeen	A	2–0	Johnston, Robinson	23,574
4th round	17 February	Rangers	A	3–0	J. Scott, Duncan (2)	64,672
Quarter-finals	9 March	Hibernian	A	3–3	J. Scott, J. Wilson, Duncan	28,236
QF replay	18 March	Hibernian	H	3–0	J. Scott, Duncan, B. Wilson	30,888
Semi-finals	3 April	Celtic	N	0–1		58,271

== UEFA Cup ==
Match day	Date	Opponent	H/A	Score	Dundee scorer(s)	Attendance
1st round, 1st leg	19 September	(Netherlands) FC Twente	H	1–3	Stewart	11,210
1st round, 2nd leg	3 October	(Netherlands) FC Twente	A	2–4	Johnston, I. Scott	15,000
Twente won 7–3 on aggregate

== Player statistics ==
Statistics provided by Dee Archive

No.	Pos	Nat	Player	Total		Division One		Scottish Cup		League Cup		UEFA Cup	
No.	Pos	Nat	Player	Apps	Goals	Apps	Goals	Apps	Goals	Apps	Goals	Apps	Goals
	GK	(Scotland) SCO	Thomson Allan	52	0	33	0	5	0	12	0	2	0
	DF	(Scotland) SCO	Ian Anderson	10	1	4	0	0	0	5	1	0+1	0
	DF	(Scotland) SCO	Alex Caldwell	10	0	9+1	0	0	0	0	0	0	0
	FW	(Scotland) SCO	John Duncan	38	18	29	13	5	4	4	1	0	0
	MF	(Scotland) SCO	Bobby Ford	50	1	31	1	5	0	12	0	2	0
	DF	(Scotland) SCO	Tommy Gemmell	49	2	30	1	5	0	12	1	2	0
	FW	(Scotland) SCO	John Gray	10	3	0+3	0	0	0	5	3	2	0
	GK	(Scotland) SCO	Mike Hewitt	1	0	1	0	0	0	0	0	0	0
	MF	(Scotland) SCO	Doug Houston	51	6	33	5	5	1	11	0	2	0
	DF	(Scotland) SCO	Davie Johnston	41	2	25+2	0	1	1	10+1	0	2	1
	FW	(Scotland) SCO	Duncan Lambie	47	7	24+7	6	5	0	8+1	1	2	0
	DF	(Scotland) SCO	Iain Phillip	35	0	26	0	5	0	4	0	0	0
	DF	(Scotland) SCO	Alex Pringle	21	1	5+6	1	0+1	0	7	0	1+1	0
	MF	(Scotland) SCO	Bobby Robinson	51	4	30+2	3	5	1	12	0	2	0
	FW	(Scotland) SCO	Ian Scott	21	1	9+6	0	0+2	0	1+1	0	1+1	1
	FW	(Scotland) SCO	Jocky Scott	48	29	30	22	5	3	11	4	2	0
	FW	(Scotland) SCO	Billy Semple	9	0	1+4	0	0	0	0+3	0	0+1	0
	DF	(Scotland) SCO	George Stewart	21	1	11	0	4	0	5	0	1	1
	MF	(Scotland) SCO	Gordon Strachan	1	0	0	0	0	0	0+1	0	0	0
	FW	(Scotland) SCO	Gordon Wallace	37	22	23+1	15	0+1	0	11	7	1	0
	DF	(Scotland) SCO	Bobby Wilson	49	4	31+2	1	5	1	9	2	2	0
	FW	(Scotland) SCO	Jimmy Wilson	33	6	22+1	4	5	1	4+1	1	0	0

== See also ==
- List of Dundee F.C. seasons
