= 1975–76 Dundee F.C. season =

Dundee
1975–76 season
- Manager: Davie White
- Premier Division: 9th (relegated)
- Scottish Cup: 3rd round
- League Cup: Group stage
- Anglo-Scottish Cup: 1st round
- Top goalscorer: League: Gordon Wallace (12); All: Gordon Wallace (14)
Home colours

The 1975–76 season was the 74th season in which Dundee competed at a Scottish national level, playing in the rebranded Scottish Premier Division. In a tight relegation scrap, Dundee were relegated for the first time since the 1937–38 season due to inferior goal average. Domestically, Dundee would also compete in both the Scottish League Cup and the Scottish Cup, where they would be eliminated in the group stage of the League Cup, and by Falkirk in the 3rd round of the Scottish Cup. Dundee would also compete in the Anglo-Scottish Cup, where they would be knocked out by Motherwell in the 1st round of the Scottish Group.

== Scottish Premier Division ==
Statistics provided by Dee Archive.

Match day	Date	Opponent	H/A	Score	Dundee scorer(s)	Attendance
1	30 August	Aberdeen	H	3–2	Ford, Gemmell (pen.), Hoggan	6,067
2	6 September	Celtic	A	0–4		24,504
3	13 September	Heart of Midlothian	H	2–3	Martin, Johnston	6,707
4	20 September	Ayr United	A	1–2	Wallace	4,024
5	27 September	Rangers	H	0–0		15,087
6	4 October	Hibernian	A	1–1	Wallace	8,708
7	11 October	St Johnstone	H	4–3	Hoggan (2) (pen.), Gordon, Wallace	5,300
8	18 October	Dundee United	A	2–1	Wallace, Hoggan (pen.)	11,327
9	25 October	Motherwell	H	3–6	Gordon, Strachan (pen.), Wallace	6,850
10	1 November	Aberdeen	A	0–2		6,313
11	8 November	Celtic	H	1–0	Robinson	16,456
12	15 November	Heart of Midlothian	A	1–1	Strachan	9,304
13	22 November	Ayr United	H	2–2	Gordon, Strachan	5,132
14	29 November	Rangers	A	1–2	Wallace	16,500
15	6 December	Hibernian	H	2–0	Caldwell (2)	7,360
16	13 December	St Johnstone	A	3–1	Wallace (3)	3,500
17	20 December	Dundee United	H	0–0		9,957
18	27 December	Motherwell	A	2–3	Wallace, Laing	7,169
19	1 January	Aberdeen	H	1–3	Hutchinson	10,009
20	3 January	Celtic	A	3–3	Lynch (o.g.), Hoggan, McIntosh	19,968
21	10 January	Heart of Midlothian	H	4–1	Wallace, Martin, Hutchinson, Robinson	6,568
22	17 January	Ayr United	A	1–3	Hutchinson	4,100
23	31 January	Rangers	H	1–1	Johnston	14,407
24	7 February	Hibernian	A	0–4		9,241
25	21 February	St Johnstone	H	3–0	Strachan (2) (pen.), Wallace	4,100
26	28 February	Dundee United	A	0–1		10,199
27	13 March	Aberdeen	A	1–0	Hutchinson	6,460
28	20 March	Celtic	H	0–1		14,830
29	27 March	Heart of Midlothian	A	0–3		7,768
30	3 April	Ayr United	H	1–2	Strachan (pen.)	4,150
31	10 April	Rangers	A	0–3		24,000
32	14 April	Hibernian	H	1–1	Ford	6,054
33	17 April	St Johnstone	A	1–1	Gemmell (pen.)	3,410
34	21 April	Dundee United	H	2–1	Gemmell (pen.), Sinclair	13,768
35	24 April	Motherwell	A	1–1	Hutchinson	4,675
36	1 May	Motherwell	H	1–0	Sinclair	7,661

=== League table ===
Pos	Team	Pld	W	D	L	GF	GA	GD	Pts	Qualification or relegation
6	Ayr United	36	14	5	17	46	59	−13	33	
7	Aberdeen	36	11	10	15	49	50	−1	32	
8	Dundee United	36	12	8	16	46	48	−2	32	
9	Dundee (R)	36	11	10	15	49	62	−13	32	Relegation to the 1976–77 Scottish First Division
10	St Johnstone (R)	36	3	5	28	29	79	−50	11	Relegation to the 1976–77 Scottish First Division

Source: Statto
Rules for classification: 1) points; 2) goal difference; 3) number of goals scored.
(R) Relegated

== Scottish League Cup ==
Statistics provided by Dee Archive.

=== Group 2 ===
Match day	Date	Opponent	H/A	Score	Dundee scorer(s)	Attendance
1	9 August	Hibernian	A	0–2		10,851
2	13 August	Dunfermline Athletic	H	4–0	Gemmell (2) (pen.), Wallace, Gordon	4,000
3	16 August	Ayr United	A	1–1	Gordon	5,000
4	20 August	Dunfermline Athletic	A	1–1	Caldwell	3,000
5	23 August	Ayr United	H	2–4	Wallace, Hoggan	5,248
6	27 August	Hibernian	H	1–2	Munro (o.g.)	4,982

==== Group 2 table ====
Team	Pld	W	D	L	GF	GA	GD	Pts
Hibernian	6	5	0	1	14	4	+10	10
Ayr United	6	2	3	1	11	9	+2	7
Dundee	6	1	2	3	9	10	−1	4
Dunfermline Athletic	6	0	3	3	4	15	−11	3

== Scottish Cup ==
Statistics provided by Dee Archive.

Match day	Date	Opponent	H/A	Score	Dundee scorer(s)	Attendance
3rd round	24 January	Falkirk	H	1–2	Laing	5,600

== Anglo-Scottish Cup ==
Match day	Date	Opponent	H/A	Score	Dundee scorer(s)	Attendance
1st round, 1st leg	4 August	Motherwell	A	1–1	Wilson	3,799
1st round, 2nd leg	6 August	Motherwell	H	0–1		4,881
Motherwell won 2–1 on aggregate

== Player statistics ==
Statistics provided by Dee Archive

No.	Pos	Nat	Player	Total		Premier Division		Scottish Cup		League Cup		Anglo-Scottish Cup	
No.	Pos	Nat	Player	Apps	Goals	Apps	Goals	Apps	Goals	Apps	Goals	Apps	Goals
	GK	(Scotland) SCO	Thomson Allan	45	0	36	0	1	0	6	0	2	0
	DF	(Scotland) SCO	Ian Anderson	3	0	2	0	0	0	0	0	1	0
	FW	(Scotland) SCO	Mitch Bavidge	5	0	0+2	0	0	0	1+2	0	0	0
	DF	(Scotland) SCO	Alex Caldwell	30	3	18+3	2	1	0	5+1	1	2	0
	MF	(Scotland) SCO	Bobby Ford	39	2	29+1	2	1	0	6	0	2	0
	DF	(Scotland) SCO	Tommy Gemmell	25	5	16+3	3	0	0	5	2	0+1	0
	FW	(Scotland) SCO	Alan Gordon	27	5	17+3	3	0	0	5	2	2	0
	MF	(Scotland) SCO	Tom Hendrie	3	0	2	0	0+1	0	0	0	0	0
	FW	(Scotland) SCO	Wilson Hoggan	29	5	16+4	5	1	0	6	0	1+1	0
	MF	(Scotland) SCO	Bobby Hutchinson	22	5	18+3	5	1	0	0	0	0	0
	DF	(Scotland) SCO	Davie Johnston	39	2	32	2	0	0	5	0	2	0
	FW	(Scotland) SCO	Derek Laing	21	2	18+2	1	1	1	0	0	0	0
	MF	(Scotland) SCO	George Mackie	16	0	14+1	0	1	0	0	0	0	0
	DF	(Scotland) SCO	John MacPhail	6	0	5+1	0	0	0	0	0	0	0
	DF	(Scotland) SCO	John Martin	16	2	10	2	0	0	4+1	0	1	0
	MF	(Scotland) SCO	Dave McIntosh	4	1	4	1	0	0	0	0	0	0
	DF	(Scotland) SCO	Iain Phillip	32	0	23+4	0	1	0	1+1	0	2	0
	FW	(Scotland) SCO	Ian Purdie	30	0	22+4	0	0	0	3+1	0	0	0
	MF	(Scotland) SCO	Bobby Robinson	29	2	17+3	2	1	0	4+2	0	2	0
	FW	(Scotland) SCO	Jocky Scott	1	0	0	0	0	0	0	0	1	0
	FW	(Scotland) SCO	Eric Sinclair	13	2	9+3	2	0	0	0	0	1	0
	DF	(Scotland) SCO	George Stewart	28	0	25	0	0	0	3	0	0	0
	MF	(Scotland) SCO	Gordon Strachan	31	6	17+6	6	1	0	6	0	1	0
	FW	(Scotland) SCO	Gordon Wallace	38	14	29+2	12	1	0	4+1	2	1	0
	DF	(Scotland) SCO	Bobby Wilson	20	1	17	0	0	0	2	0	1	1

== See also ==
- List of Dundee F.C. seasons
