= 1972–73 Dundee F.C. season =

Dundee
1972–73 season
- Manager: Davie White
- Division One: 5th
- Scottish Cup: Semi-finals
- League Cup: Quarter-finals
- Texaco Cup: 1st round
- Top goalscorer: League: John Duncan (23); All: John Duncan (40)
Home colours

The 1972–73 season was the 71st season in which Dundee competed at a Scottish national level, playing in Division One, where the club would finish in 5th place for the third consecutive season. Domestically, Dundee would also compete in both the Scottish League Cup and the Scottish Cup, where they would get knocked out by Celtic in both the quarter-finals of the League Cup and the semi-finals of the Scottish Cup, with both ties requiring replays. Dundee would also compete in the Texaco Cup, where they would be knocked out by Norwich City in the 1st round.

== Scottish Division One ==
Statistics provided by Dee Archive.

Match day	Date	Opponent	H/A	Score	Dundee scorer(s)	Attendance
1	2 September	Motherwell	A	2–2	J. Wilson, Duncan	5,000
2	9 September	Aberdeen	H	0–0		10,100
3	16 September	Dundee United	A	1–2	Ford	12,071
4	23 September	Celtic	H	2–0	I. Scott, Gray	18,226
5	30 September	Airdrieonians	A	1–0	Robinson	2,500
6	7 October	Hibernian	H	1–0	Ford	11,618
7	14 October	Dumbarton	A	2–2	Wallace, Cushley (o.g.)	4,000
8	21 October	Kilmarnock	H	1–0	Duncan	5,600
9	28 October	Greenock Morton	A	2–5	Rowan (o.g.), Duncan	2,500
10	4 November	Rangers	H	1–1	Wallace	19,600
11	11 November	Arbroath	A	1–2	Duncan	5,149
12	18 November	St Johnstone	H	3–0	Duncan, Robinson, Houston	6,000
13	25 November	Ayr United	A	1–2	Anderson	5,000
14	2 December	East Fife	H	4–0	Duncan (2), Wallace, J. Scott	5,300
15	9 December	Falkirk	A	2–2	Duncan, I. Scott	4,000
16	16 December	Partick Thistle	H	4–1	Duncan (3), Johnston	3,900
17	23 December	Heart of Midlothian	A	2–1	Stewart, Duncan	8,366
18	30 December	Motherwell	H	2–0	Duncan, J. Scott	5,600
19	1 January	Aberdeen	A	1–3	J. Scott	13,576
20	6 January	Dundee United	H	3–0	Duncan (2), Houston	13,570
21	13 January	Celtic	A	1–2	Houston	25,977
22	27 January	Hibernian	A	1–1	Duncan	15,896
23	10 February	Dumbarton	H	2–1	J. Scott, Wallace	4,500
24	20 February	Airdrieonians	H	1–1	Stewart	3,650
25	27 February	Kilmarnock	A	2–1	I. Scott, J. Scott	2,000
26	3 March	Greenock Morton	H	6–0	J. Wilson (2), J. Scott, Duncan (3)	5,000
27	10 March	Rangers	A	1–3	Duncan	32,500
28	21 March	Arbroath	H	6–0	J. Scott (3), Duncan (2), Wallace	5,950
29	24 March	St Johnstone	A	1–4	Lambie (o.g.)	4,500
30	31 March	Ayr United	H	2–1	J. Scott, Houston	5,050
31	14 April	Falkirk	H	5–3	Wallace (2), Duncan, J. Scott (2)	4,000
32	18 April	East Fife	A	1–0	Semple	4,304
33	21 April	Partick Thistle	A	1–1	Wallace	5,000
34	28 April	Heart of Midlothian	H	2–2	Wallace, Houston	6,348

=== League table ===
Pos	Team	Pld	W	D	L	GF	GA	GD	Pts
3	Hibernian	34	19	7	8	74	33	+41	45
4	Aberdeen	34	16	11	7	61	34	+27	43
5	Dundee	34	17	9	8	68	43	+25	43
6	Ayr United	34	16	8	10	50	51	−1	40
7	Dundee United	34	17	5	12	56	51	+5	39

Source: Soccerbase and League Tables

== Scottish League Cup ==
Statistics provided by Dee Archive.

=== Group 7 ===
Match day	Date	Opponent	H/A	Score	Dundee scorer(s)	Attendance
1	12 August	East Stirlingshire	A	8–2	Duncan (5), Robinson, J. Wilson, Stein (o.g.)	1,500
2	16 August	Clyde	H	2–1	Duncan, I. Scott	4,900
3	19 August	Motherwell	A	3–1	J. Wilson, Duncan (2)	5,000
4	23 August	Clyde	A	1–0	Phillip	2,000
5	26 August	East Stirlingshire	H	3–0	Duncan, J. Scott, Robinson	4,700
6	30 August	Motherwell	H	2–1	Wallace, Duncan	4,000

==== Group 7 table ====
Team	Pld	W	D	L	GF	GA	GD	Pts
Dundee	6	6	0	0	19	5	+14	12
Motherwell	6	2	2	2	11	9	+2	6
Clyde	6	2	2	2	9	7	+2	6
East Stirlingshire	6	0	0	6	4	22	−18	0

=== Knockout stage ===
Match day	Date	Opponent	H/A	Score	Dundee scorer(s)	Attendance
2nd round, 1st leg	20 September	Dumbarton	A	0–3		4,000
2nd round, 2nd leg	4 October	Dumbarton	H	4–0	I. Scott, Wallace (2), Duncan	7,200
Dundee won 4–3 on aggregate
Quarter-finals, 1st leg	11 October	Celtic	H	1–0	Wallace	14,492
Quarter-finals, 2nd leg	1 November	Celtic	A	2–3 (A.E.T.)	Wallace, J. Scott	36,416
Aggregate tied at 3–3, replay required
QF Replay	20 November	Celtic	N	1–4	J. Scott	36,483

== Scottish Cup ==
Statistics provided by Dee Archive.

Match day	Date	Opponent	H/A	Score	Dundee scorer(s)	Attendance
3rd round	3 February	Dunfermline Athletic	A	3–0	J. Wilson, Duncan, J. Scott	10,618
4th round	24 February	Stranraer	A	9–2	Duncan (4), Wallace (3), Houston, I. Scott	3,350
Quarter-finals	17 March	Montrose	A	4–1	Wallace, J. Scott (2), Duncan	8,893
Semi-finals	7 April	Celtic	N	0–0		53,428
SF Replay	11 April	Celtic	N	0–3		47,384

== Texaco Cup ==
Match day	Date	Opponent	H/A	Score	Dundee scorer(s)	Attendance
1st round, 1st leg	13 September	(England) Norwich City	H	2–1	I. Scott, Lambie	8,000
1st round, 2nd leg	27 September	(England) Norwich City	A	0–2		18,339
Norwich won 3–2 on aggregate

== Player statistics ==
Statistics provided by Dee Archive

No.	Pos	Nat	Player	Total		Division One		Scottish Cup		League Cup		Texaco Cup	
No.	Pos	Nat	Player	Apps	Goals	Apps	Goals	Apps	Goals	Apps	Goals	Apps	Goals
	GK	(Scotland) SCO	Thomson Allan	42	0	29	0	5	0	8	0	0	0
	DF	(Scotland) SCO	Ian Anderson	12	1	5+1	1	1	0	1+4	0	0	0
	FW	(Scotland) SCO	John Duncan	46	40	30+1	23	5	6	10	11	0	0
	MF	(Scotland) SCO	Bobby Ford	35	2	19+4	2	1+2	0	9	0	0	0
	FW	(Scotland) SCO	John Gray	9	1	3+2	1	0	0	1+2	0	1	0
	GK	(Scotland) SCO	Mike Hewitt	10	0	5	0	0	0	3	0	2	0
	MF	(Scotland) SCO	Doug Houston	51	6	33	5	5	1	11	0	2	0
	DF	(Scotland) SCO	Davie Johnston	25	1	18	1	5	0	2	0	0	0
	FW	(Scotland) SCO	Duncan Lambie	17	1	12+2	0	0	0	2	0	1	1
	DF	(Scotland) SCO	Ian Mathieson	1	0	1	0	0	0	0	0	0	0
	MF	(Scotland) SCO	Duncan MacLeod	1	0	0	0	0	0	0	0	1	0
	DF	(Scotland) SCO	Iain Phillip	12	1	4	0	0	0	7	1	1	0
	DF	(Scotland) SCO	Alex Pringle	11	0	9+1	0	0	0	1	0	0	0
	MF	(Scotland) SCO	Bobby Robinson	49	4	31	2	5	0	11	2	2	0
	FW	(Scotland) SCO	Ian Scott	42	7	25+1	3	4+1	1	9	2	2	1
	FW	(Scotland) SCO	Jocky Scott	50	18	31+1	12	5	3	11	3	2	0
	FW	(Scotland) SCO	Billy Semple	8	1	2+4	1	0+2	0	0	0	0	0
	FW	(Scotland) SCO	Ian Smith	1	0	1	0	0	0	0	0	0	0
	DF	(Scotland) SCO	George Stewart	47	2	33	2	5	0	7	0	2	0
	FW	(Scotland) SCO	Gordon Wallace	48	18	31+1	9	5	4	9	5	2	0
	DF	(Scotland) SCO	Bobby Wilson	50	0	32+1	0	5	0	10	0	2	0
	FW	(Scotland) SCO	Jimmy Wilson	37	5	20+1	3	4	1	9+1	1	2	0

== See also ==
- List of Dundee F.C. seasons
