= 1970–71 Dundee F.C. season =

Dundee
1970–71 season
- Manager: John Prentice
- Division One: 5th
- Scottish Cup: Quarter-finals
- League Cup: Quarter-finals
- Texaco Cup: 1st round
- Top goalscorer: League: Jocky Scott (16); All: Jocky Scott (21)
Home colours

The 1970–71 season was the 69th season in which Dundee competed at a Scottish national level, playing in Division One, where the club would finish in 5th place. Domestically, Dundee would also compete in both the Scottish League Cup and the Scottish Cup, where they would get knocked out by Celtic in the quarter-finals of the League Cup, and by Hibernian in the quarter-finals of the Scottish Cup. Dundee would also compete in the first edition of the Texaco Cup, being knocked out by English side Wolves in the 1st round.

== Scottish Division One ==
Statistics provided by Dee Archive.

Match day	Date	Opponent	H/A	Score	Dundee scorer(s)	Attendance
1	29 August	Cowdenbeath	A	1–0	Duncan	5,500
2	5 September	Aberdeen	H	1–2	Duncan	9,000
3	12 September	Dundee United	A	2–3	Gilroy, Scott	12,319
4	19 September	St Mirren	H	2–2	Wallace (2)	5,000
5	26 September	Celtic	A	0–3		25,665
6	3 October	Falkirk	H	1–2	Scott	4,000
7	10 October	Ayr United	A	1–0	Duncan	5,500
8	17 October	Heart of Midlothian	H	1–0	Scott	4,121
9	24 October	St Johnstone	A	3–3	Wallace (2), Duncan	6,500
10	31 October	Kilmarnock	H	3–0	Wallace, Johnston, Kinninmonth	4,000
11	7 November	Hibernian	A	2–1	Wallace (2)	7,210
12	14 November	Airdrieonians	A	3–0	Wallace, Scott (2)	5,500
13	21 November	Dunfermline Athletic	H	0–0		5,000
14	28 November	Clyde	H	1–3	Scott	5,500
15	5 December	Rangers	A	0–0		25,420
16	12 December	Greenock Morton	H	2–0	Scott, Gilroy	4,000
17	19 December	Motherwell	A	1–1	Wallace	7,000
18	26 December	Cowdenbeath	H	5–1	Wallace, Scott (2), Gilroy, Kinninmonth	5,000
19	1 January	Aberdeen	A	0–3		24,000
20	9 January	St Mirren	A	4–2	Duncan (2), Scott (2)	3,500
21	16 January	Celtic	H	1–8	Duncan	20,169
22	30 January	Falkirk	A	2–2	Duncan, B. Wilson	6,000
23	6 February	Ayr United	H	2–1	Wallace, B. Wilson	4,500
24	20 February	Heart of Midlothian	A	0–0		7,268
25	27 February	St Johnstone	H	0–1		9,500
26	9 March	Kilmarnock	A	1–1	Scott	3,003
27	13 March	Hibernian	H	1–0	B. Wilson	5,758
28	20 March	Airdrieonians	A	6–2	Duncan (3), Scott, Bryce (2)	1,000
29	27 March	Dunfermline Athletic	H	0–0		6,500
30	3 April	Clyde	A	0–0		1,000
31	5 April	Dundee United	H	2–3	Scott, Steele	11,590
32	10 April	Rangers	H	1–0	Scott	18,000
33	17 April	Greenock Morton	A	0–1		2,500
34	24 April	Motherwell	H	4–0	Easton, Kinninmonth, Scott, Wallace	4,500

=== League table ===
Pos	Team	Pld	W	D	L	GF	GA	GD	Pts
3	St Johnstone	34	19	6	9	59	44	+15	44
4	Rangers	34	16	9	9	58	34	+24	41
5	Dundee	34	14	10	10	53	45	+8	38
6	Dundee United	34	14	8	12	53	54	−1	36
7	Falkirk	34	13	9	12	46	53	−7	35

Source: Soccerbase and League Tables

== Scottish League Cup ==
Statistics provided by Dee Archive.

=== Group 3 ===
Match day	Date	Opponent	H/A	Score	Dundee scorer(s)	Attendance
1	8 August	St Mirren	H	1–0	Kinninmonth	6,000
2	12 August	Ayr United	A	2–1	Duncan	6,500
3	15 August	Kilmarnock	H	2–0	Scott (2)	8,000
4	19 August	Ayr United	H	4–1	Steele, Wallace, Scott, J. Wilson	6,000
5	22 August	St Mirren	A	2–0	Duncan, Scott	4,000
6	26 August	Kilmarnock	A	1–2	Duncan	3,000

==== Group 3 table ====
Team	Pld	W	D	L	GF	GA	GD	Pts
Dundee	6	5	0	1	12	4	+8	10
Kilmarnock	6	4	1	1	8	4	+4	9
Ayr United	6	1	2	3	6	10	−4	4
St Mirren	6	0	1	5	4	12	−8	1

=== Knockout stage ===
Match day	Date	Opponent	H/A	Score	Dundee scorer(s)	Attendance
Quarter-finals, 1st leg	9 September	Celtic	H	2–2	Kinninmonth, Scott	20,933
Quarter-finals, 2nd leg	23 September	Celtic	A	1–5	Wallace	38,151
Celtic won 7–3 on aggregate

== Scottish Cup ==
Statistics provided by Dee Archive.

Match day	Date	Opponent	H/A	Score	Dundee scorer(s)	Attendance
1st round	23 January	Partick Thistle	H	1–0	Johnston	8,000
2nd round	13 February	Stirling Albion	H	2–0	Johnston, B. Wilson	6,000
Quarter-finals	6 March	Hibernian	A	0–1		21,710

== Texaco Cup ==
Match day	Date	Opponent	H/A	Score	Dundee scorer(s)	Attendance
1st round, 1st leg	16 September	(England) Wolverhampton Wanderers	H	1–2	Wallace	11,500
1st round, 2nd leg	29 September	(England) Wolverhampton Wanderers	A	0–0		13,042
Wolves won 2–1 on aggregate

== Player statistics ==
Statistics provided by Dee Archive

No.	Pos	Nat	Player	Total		Division One		Scottish Cup		League Cup		Texaco Cup	
No.	Pos	Nat	Player	Apps	Goals	Apps	Goals	Apps	Goals	Apps	Goals	Apps	Goals
	MF	(Scotland) SCO	Alex Bryce	26	2	14+2	2	1+1	0	7	0	1	0
	GK	(Scotland) SCO	Ally Donaldson	42	0	29	0	3	0	8	0	2	0
	FW	(Scotland) SCO	John Duncan	25	15	13+2	11	0+1	0	6+1	4	1+1	0
	MF	(Scotland) SCO	Jim Easton	9	1	6	1	0	0	3	0	0	0
	FW	(Scotland) SCO	George Falconer	3	0	1+2	0	0	0	0	0	0	0
	MF	(Scotland) SCO	Jim Fraser	3	0	2	0	0	0	1	0	0	0
	FW	(Scotland) SCO	Joe Gilroy	18	3	14+1	3	1	0	1	0	1	0
	GK	(Scotland) SCO	Mike Hewitt	5	0	5	0	0	0	0	0	0	0
	MF	(Scotland) SCO	Doug Houston	46	0	32+1	0	3	0	8	0	2	0
	DF	(Scotland) SCO	Davie Johnston	35	3	25+3	1	3	2	3	0	0+1	0
	FW	(Scotland) SCO	Alex Kinninmonth	36	5	25+2	3	2	0	6	2	1	0
	FW	(Scotland) SCO	Duncan Lambie	1	0	1	0	0	0	0	0	0	0
	DF	(Scotland) SCO	Iain Phillip	34	0	29+1	0	3	0	0+1	0	0	0
	FW	(Scotland) SCO	Jocky Scott	45	21	33	16	3	0	7	5	2	0
	DF	(Scotland) SCO	Ron Selway	22	0	15+1	0	1+1	0	2	0	2	0
	DF	(Scotland) SCO	Dave Souter	12	0	9+1	0	1	0	1	0	0	0
	DF	(Scotland) SCO	Jim Steele	40	2	28	1	3	0	7	1	2	0
	DF	(Scotland) SCO	George Stewart	20	0	9	0	1	0	8	0	2	0
	FW	(Scotland) SCO	Gordon Wallace	46	14	33	11	3	0	8	2	2	1
	DF	(Scotland) SCO	Bobby Wilson	44	4	32	3	3	1	7	0	2	0
	FW	(Scotland) SCO	Jimmy Wilson	30	0	19+2	0	2	0	5	0	2	0

== See also ==
- List of Dundee F.C. seasons
