= 1976–77 Dundee F.C. season =

Dundee
1976–77 season
- Manager: Davie White
- First Division: 3rd
- Scottish Cup: Semi-finals
- League Cup: Group stage
- Top goalscorer: League: Billy Pirie (38); All: Billy Pirie (44)
Home colours

The 1976–77 season was the 75th season in which Dundee competed at a Scottish national level, playing in the second tier for the first time since the 1946–47 season. The club would fail to achieve promotion, finishing in 3rd place. Dundee would also compete in both the Scottish League Cup and the Scottish Cup, where they would be eliminated in the group stage of the League Cup, and would reach the semi-finals of the Scottish Cup before being defeated by Celtic.

For the first time in their history, Dundee's kit would be made by an official manufacturer, namely Admiral, who brought their unique look to Dens Park with their curved stripes.

== Scottish First Division ==
Statistics provided by Dee Archive.

Match day	Date	Opponent	H/A	Score	Dundee scorer(s)	Attendance
1	4 September	Dumbarton	H	2–1	Hutchinson, Pirie	4,619
2	8 September	East Fife	A	4–2	Strachan, Sinclair, Pirie (2)	2,083
3	11 September	Greenock Morton	A	2–2	Hutchinson, Sinclair	1,800
4	15 September	Arbroath	H	2–1	Carson (o.g.), Pirie	4,229
5	18 September	Queen of the South	H	1–1	Pirie	5,061
6	22 September	Airdrieonians	A	2–2	Pirie, Hutchinson	3,000
7	25 September	Falkirk	A	6–1	Hutchinson (2), Purdie, Pirie (2), Strachan	2,500
8	29 September	Hamilton Academical	H	5–1	Pirie (3) (pen.), Purdie, Hutchinson	3,500
9	2 October	St Mirren	A	0–4		4,000
10	6 October	Hamilton Academical	A	2–4	Pirie (pen.), Purdie	1,000
11	9 October	Raith Rovers	H	3–1	Ford, Pirie (2)	5,372
12	16 October	Clydebank	A	1–2	Pirie	2,000
13	23 October	Montrose	H	6–1	Sinclair (3), Pirie (2), Hutchinson	4,941
14	30 October	St Johnstone	A	1–0	Pirie	5,329
15	10 November	Dumbarton	A	1–1	Hutchinson	500
16	13 November	Greenock Morton	H	1–1	Gemmell (pen.)	4,948
17	20 November	Queen of the South	A	2–2	Purdie (2)	2,000
18	27 November	Falkirk	H	2–0	Sinclair, Ford	4,287
19	15 December	Raith Rovers	A	2–1	Hutchinson, Robinson	1,645
20	25 December	Montrose	A	1–0	Purdie	3,500
21	8 January	Greenock Morton	A	3–2	Pirie (2), Hoggan	2,000
22	22 January	Falkirk	A	8–0	Pirie (4), Sinclair (3), Purdie	2,500
23	5 February	St Mirren	A	1–3	Strachan	10,000
24	12 February	Raith Rovers	H	4–0	Hoggan, Pirie (2), Sinclair	5,088
25	15 February	Queen of the South	H	0–2		4,635
26	19 February	Clydebank	A	0–3		3,900
27	5 March	Montrose	H	3–2	Strachan (2), Pirie	4,333
28	15 March	St Johnstone	H	2–0	Gemmell (pen.), Laing	2,849
29	19 March	Arbroath	A	0–1		2,330
30	23 March	Dumbarton	H	4–0	Pirie (4)	2,401
31	26 March	Arbroath	H	5–2	Strachan, Pirie (3), Sinclair	4,006
32	30 March	St Johnstone	A	0–0		2,048
33	2 April	Airdrieonians	A	2–2	Pirie, Gemmell (pen.)	1,500
34	9 April	Airdrieonians	H	3–1	Phillip, Pirie, Strachan	3,926
35	12 April	Clydebank	H	2–3	Hutchinson, Ford	8,707
36	16 April	East Fife	H	2–2	Gemmell (pen.), Hutchinson	2,887
37	19 April	St Mirren	H	0–4		4,386
38	23 April	East Fife	A	2–0	Pirie, Robinson	2,263
39	30 April	Hamilton Academical	A	3–0	Hutchinson, Caldwell, Pirie	400

=== League table ===
Pos	Team	Pld	W	D	L	GF	GA	GD	Pts	Promotion or relegation
1	St Mirren (C, P)	39	25	12	2	91	38	+53	62	Promotion to the Premier Division
2	Clydebank (P)	39	24	10	5	89	38	+51	58	Promotion to the Premier Division
3	Dundee	39	21	9	9	90	55	+35	51	
4	Morton	39	20	10	9	77	52	+25	50	
5	Montrose	39	16	9	14	61	62	−1	41	

Source: RSSSF and statto
Rules for classification: 1) points; 2) goal difference; 3) number of goals scored.
(C) Champions; (P) Promoted

== Scottish League Cup ==
Statistics provided by Dee Archive.

=== Group 1 ===
Match day	Date	Opponent	H/A	Score	Dundee scorer(s)	Attendance
1	14 August	Heart of Midlothian	A	0–2		9,401
2	18 August	Motherwell	H	2–1	Sinclair, Hutchinson	6,000
3	21 August	Partick Thistle	H	0–2		5,837
4	25 August	Motherwell	A	3–3	Pirie (3) (pen.)	4,258
5	28 August	Partick Thistle	A	1–0	Hoggan	5,000
6	1 September	Heart of Midlothian	H	3–2	Robinson, Pirie, Purdie	4,733

==== Group 1 table ====
Team	Pld	W	D	L	GF	GA	GD	Pts
Heart of Midlothian	6	4	1	1	15	8	+7	9
Dundee	6	3	1	2	9	10	−1	7
Partick Thistle	6	2	2	2	8	7	+1	6
Motherwell	6	0	2	4	7	14	−7	2

== Scottish Cup ==
Statistics provided by Dee Archive.

Match day	Date	Opponent	H/A	Score	Dundee scorer(s)	Attendance
3rd round	7 February	St Johnstone	A	1–1	Purdie	7,000
3R replay	8 February	St Johnstone	H	4–2	Pirie (2), Purdie, Hutchinson	8,197
4th round	26 February	Aberdeen	H	0–0		16,999
4R replay	2 March	Aberdeen	A	2–1	Hutchinson (2)	18,373
Quarter-finals	12 March	Arbroath	A	3–1	Strachan, Sinclair (2)	9,558
Semi-finals	6 April	Celtic	N	0–2		29,900

== Player statistics ==
Statistics provided by Dee Archive

No.	Pos	Nat	Player	Total		First Division		Scottish Cup		League Cup	
No.	Pos	Nat	Player	Apps	Goals	Apps	Goals	Apps	Goals	Apps	Goals
	GK	(Scotland) SCO	Thomson Allan	16	0	10	0	0	0	6	0
	DF	(Scotland) SCO	Alex Caldwell	46	1	31+3	1	5+1	0	5+1	0
	GK	(Scotland) SCO	Ally Donaldson	35	0	29	0	6	0	0	0
	MF	(Scotland) SCO	Bobby Ford	46	4	34+3	3	6	0	3	1
	DF	(Scotland) SCO	Tommy Gemmell	25	4	20	4	2	0	3	0
	FW	(Scotland) SCO	Wilson Hoggan	36	3	23+4	2	4	0	3+2	1
	MF	(Scotland) SCO	Bobby Hutchinson	45	16	35	12	5	3	5	1
	DF	(Scotland) SCO	Davie Johnston	28	0	21+1	0	5	0	1	0
	FW	(Scotland) SCO	Derek Laing	13	1	2+8	1	0+1	0	1+1	0
	DF	(Scotland) SCO	Dave MacKinnon	9	0	2+2	0	0+1	0	3+1	0
	DF	(Scotland) SCO	John MacPhail	35	0	23+2	0	4	0	6	0
	DF	(Scotland) SCO	John Martin	21	0	12+2	0	1	0	6	0
	MF	(Scotland) SCO	Dave McIntosh	5	0	2+1	0	0+2	0	0	0
	FW	(Scotland) SCO	Paddy Morris	1	0	0	0	0	0	0+1	0
	DF	(Scotland) SCO	Iain Phillip	48	1	36	1	6	0	6	0
	FW	(Scotland) SCO	Billy Pirie	44	44	33	38	6	2	5	4
	FW	(Scotland) SCO	Ian Purdie	46	10	33+1	7	6	2	6	1
	MF	(Scotland) SCO	Ian Redford	1	0	0+1	0	0	0	0	0
	MF	(Scotland) SCO	Bobby Robinson	40	3	20+13	2	2+2	0	2+1	1
	FW	(Scotland) SCO	Eric Sinclair	43	14	30+3	11	2+3	2	5	1
	MF	(Scotland) SCO	Gordon Strachan	42	8	33+3	7	6	1	0	0

== See also ==
- List of Dundee F.C. seasons
