= 1971–72 Dundee F.C. season =

Dundee
1971–72 season
- Manager: John Prentice (1971); Davie White (1972)
- Division One: 5th
- Scottish Cup: 4th round
- League Cup: Group stage
- UEFA Cup: 3rd round
- Top goalscorer: League: Gordon Wallace (16); All: Gordon Wallace (21)
Home colours

The 1971–72 season was the 70th season in which Dundee competed at a Scottish national level, playing in Division One, where the club would finish in 5th place for the second consecutive season. Domestically, Dundee would also compete in both the Scottish League Cup and the Scottish Cup, where they would get knocked out in the group stages of the League Cup, and by Celtic in the 4th round of the Scottish Cup. Dundee would also compete in the UEFA Cup, where they would reach the 3rd round before being eliminated by A.C. Milan.

For the first time since the 1945–46 season, and the first time in the Scottish Football League since the 1901–02 season, Dundee would switch their primary colours from navy blue to white. The change however proved unpopular, and it would be the last season to date where the club alternated from their traditional home colours.

== Scottish Division One ==
Statistics provided by Dee Archive.

Match day	Date	Opponent	H/A	Score	Dundee scorer(s)	Attendance
1	4 September	Aberdeen	A	0–3		13,188
2	11 September	Dundee United	H	6–4	Wallace (2), Bryce (2), J. Scott (2) (pen.)	16,500
3	18 September	East Fife	A	5–2	Wallace (4), Johnston	5,331
4	25 September	Heart of Midlothian	H	0–0		10,185
5	2 October	Ayr United	A	0–0		6,000
6	9 October	Falkirk	H	4–0	Duncan, Wallace (2), Lambie	7,500
7	16 October	Celtic	A	1–3	Duncan	31,460
8	25 October	Partick Thistle	H	0–0		10,000
9	30 October	Motherwell	A	3–1	Wallace, Duncan (2)	3,813
10	6 November	Greenock Morton	H	0–1		6,000
11	13 November	Rangers	A	3–2	Kinninmonth, Wallace, Johnston	33,200
12	20 November	Clyde	H	0–0		4,700
13	27 November	Dunfermline Athletic	A	2–1	Wallace, Duncan	5,000
14	4 December	Airdrieonians	H	4–1	J. Scott (3), Duncan	5,000
15	11 December	Hibernian	A	0–1		11,383
16	18 December	Kilmarnock	H	2–0	J. Scott, Wallace	4,800
17	25 December	St Johnstone	A	0–0		6,800
18	1 January	Aberdeen	H	1–1	Duncan	19,000
19	3 January	Dundee United	A	1–1	Steele	16,954
20	8 January	East Fife	H	0–0		6,500
21	15 January	Heart of Midlothian	A	5–2	Duncan (2), Wallace (2), I. Scott	8,667
22	22 January	Ayr United	H	5–1	Duncan, J. Scott (2) (pen.), I. Scott (2)	5,500
23	29 January	Falkirk	A	1–1	Duncan	5,000
24	19 February	Partick Thistle	A	0–0		7,000
25	4 March	Motherwell	H	2–0	Wallace, Muir (o.g.)	5,000
26	11 March	Greenock Morton	A	2–2	J. Scott, Wallace	3,200
27	25 March	Clyde	A	1–1	Johnston	1,500
28	1 April	Dunfermline Athletic	H	1–0	J. Scott	5,000
29	8 April	Airdrieonians	A	2–4	I. Scott, J. Scott	4,200
30	10 April	Rangers	H	2–0	I. Scott, Stewart	13,000
31	17 April	Hibernian	H	1–2	J. Wilson	9,137
32	22 April	Kilmarnock	A	3–0	Johnston, Duncan, J. Scott	4,000
33	29 April	St Johnstone	H	1–3	Duncan	5,500
34	1 May	Celtic	H	1–1	I. Scott	10,755

=== League table ===
Pos	Team	Pld	W	D	L	GF	GA	GD	Pts
3	Rangers	34	21	2	11	71	38	+33	44
4	Hibernian	34	19	6	9	62	34	+28	44
5	Dundee	34	14	13	7	59	38	+21	41
6	Heart of Midlothian	34	13	13	8	53	49	+4	39
7	Partick Thistle	34	12	10	12	53	54	−1	34

Source: Soccerbase and League Tables

== Scottish League Cup ==
Statistics provided by Dee Archive.

=== Group 2 ===
Match day	Date	Opponent	H/A	Score	Dundee scorer(s)	Attendance
1	14 August	Aberdeen	A	1–1	Duncan	19,053
2	18 August	Falkirk	H	2–2	Johnston, Wallace	8,500
3	21 August	Clyde	A	1–0	B. Wilson	2,000
4	25 August	Falkirk	A	0–1		6,000
5	28 August	Aberdeen	H	3–1	Wallace (2), Houston	11,875
6	1 September	Clyde	H	3–0	J. Scott (2), Bryce	6,030

==== Group 2 table ====
Team	Pld	W	D	L	GF	GA	GD	Pts
Falkirk	6	4	1	1	12	6	+6	9
Dundee	6	3	2	1	10	5	+5	8
Aberdeen	6	3	1	2	11	7	+4	7
Clyde	6	0	0	6	2	17	−15	0

== Scottish Cup ==
Statistics provided by Dee Archive.

Match day	Date	Opponent	H/A	Score	Dundee scorer(s)	Attendance
3rd round	9 February	Queen of the South	H	3–0	B. Wilson, Johnston, J. Scott	8,500
4th round	26 February	Celtic	A	0–4		47,500

== UEFA Cup ==
Match day	Date	Opponent	H/A	Score	Dundee scorer(s)	Attendance
1st round, 1st leg	15 September	(Denmark) AB	H	4–2	Bryce (2), Wallace, Lambie	10,000
1st round, 2nd leg	29 September	(Denmark) AB	A	1–0	Duncan	2,000
Dundee won 5–2 on aggregate
2nd round, 1st leg	19 October	(Germany) 1. FC Köln	A	1–2	Kinninmonth	16,000
2nd round, 2nd leg	3 November	(Germany) 1. FC Köln	H	4–2	Duncan (3), B. Wilson	15,500
Dundee won 5–4 on aggregate
3rd round, 1st leg	24 November	(Italy) A.C. Milan	A	0–3		25,500
3rd round, 2nd leg	8 December	(Italy) A.C. Milan	H	2–0	Wallace, Duncan	15,500
A.C. Milan won 3–2 on aggregate

== Player statistics ==
Statistics provided by Dee Archive

No.	Pos	Nat	Player	Total		Division One		Scottish Cup		League Cup		UEFA Cup	
No.	Pos	Nat	Player	Apps	Goals	Apps	Goals	Apps	Goals	Apps	Goals	Apps	Goals
	MF	(Scotland) SCO	Alex Bryce	8	5	4+1	2	0	0	0+2	1	1	2
	GK	(Scotland) SCO	Ally Donaldson	6	0	3	0	0	0	0	0	3	0
	FW	(Scotland) SCO	John Duncan	45	19	32	13	2	0	6	1	4+1	5
	MF	(Scotland) SCO	Bobby Ford	22	0	19+1	0	2	0	0	0	0	0
	GK	(Scotland) SCO	Mike Hewitt	42	0	31	0	2	0	6	0	3	0
	MF	(Scotland) SCO	Doug Houston	42	1	28	0	2	0	6	1	6	0
	DF	(Scotland) SCO	Davie Johnston	47	6	33	4	2	1	6	1	5+1	0
	FW	(Scotland) SCO	Alex Kinninmonth	25	2	9+5	1	0+1	0	4+1	0	5	1
	FW	(Scotland) SCO	Duncan Lambie	31	2	20+3	1	2	0	2	0	3+1	1
	DF	(Scotland) SCO	Iain Phillip	45	0	32	0	2	0	6	0	5	0
	FW	(Scotland) SCO	Ian Scott	23	6	14+2	6	2	0	2	0	0+3	0
	FW	(Scotland) SCO	Jocky Scott	48	15	34	12	2	1	6	2	6	0
	DF	(Scotland) SCO	Ron Selway	6	0	3+1	0	0	0	0	0	0+2	0
	DF	(Scotland) SCO	Jim Steele	31	1	19	1	0	0	6	0	6	0
	DF	(Scotland) SCO	George Stewart	19	1	16	1	0	0	0	0	3	0
	FW	(Scotland) SCO	Gordon Wallace	46	21	30+2	16	2	0	6	3	6	2
	DF	(Scotland) SCO	Bobby Wilson	46	3	32	0	2	1	6	1	6	1
	FW	(Scotland) SCO	Jimmy Wilson	28	1	15+4	1	0	0	4	0	4+1	0

== See also ==
- List of Dundee F.C. seasons
