= 1973 Scottish League Cup final =

- Event: 1973–74 Scottish League Cup
Dundee	Celtic
1	0
- Date: 15 December 1973
- Venue: Hampden Park, Glasgow
- Referee: Bobby Davidson
- Attendance: 27,924

The 1973 Scottish League Cup final was played on 15 December 1973 and was the final of the 28th Scottish League Cup competition. It was contested by Dundee and Celtic. Dundee won the match 1–0, with Gordon Wallace scoring the winning goal.

== Match details ==
15 December 1973
1:30pm

Dundee	1–0	Celtic
Wallace 76'	Report

Hampden Park, Glasgow
Attendance: 27,924
Referee: Bobby Davidson

DUNDEE:
GK	1	Thomson Allan
DF	2	Bobby Wilson
DF	3	Tommy Gemmell
MF	4	Bobby Ford
DF	5	George Stewart
DF	6	Iain Phillip (c)
MF	7	John Duncan
MF	8	Bobby Robinson
FW	9	Gordon Wallace 76'
FW	10	Jocky Scott
MF	11	Duncan Lambie	Substituted off
Substitutes:
DF	12	Davie Johnston	Substituted on
FW	13	Ian Scott
Manager:
David White

CELTIC:
GK	1	Ally Hunter
DF	2	Danny McGrain
DF	3	Jim Brogan
DF	4	Pat McCluskey
DF	5	Billy McNeill (c)
MF	6	Steve Murray
MF	7	Harry Hood	Substituted off
MF	8	David Hay		Substituted off
MF	9	Paul Wilson
FW	10	Tommy Callaghan
FW	11	Kenny Dalglish
Substitutes:
MF	?	Jimmy Johnstone	Substituted on
MF	?	George Connelly		Substituted on
Manager:
Jock Stein

== Media coverage ==
In Scotland highlights of the final was shown on BBC One Scotland on their Sportsreel programme in the evening and also on STV and Grampian Television on the former's Scotsport programme the following day.
