= 1969–70 Rangers F.C. season =

Rangers
1969–70 season
- Chairman: John Lawrence
- Manager: David White (until 27 November); Willie Thornton (from 27 November); William Waddell (8 December)
- Ground: Ibrox Park
- Scottish League Division One: 2nd P34 W19 D7 L8 F67 A40 Pts45
- Scottish Cup: Quarter-finals
- League Cup: Sectional round
- Cup Winners' Cup: Second round
- Top goalscorer: League: Colin Stein (24); All: Colin Stein (27)

The 1969–70 season was the 90th season of competitive football by Rangers.

== Overview ==
Rangers played a total of 47 competitive matches during the 1969–70 season.

== Results ==
All results are written with Rangers' score first.

=== Scottish First Division ===
Date	Opponent	Venue	Result	Attendance	Scorers
30 August 1969	Dundee United	A	0–0	22,000	
3 September 1969	Aberdeen	H	2–0	45,000	David Provan (Pen), Colin Stein
6 September 1969	St Mirren	H	2–0	41,000	Willie Johnston, David Provan (Pen)
13 September 1969	Ayr United	A	1–2	25,250	Colin Stein
20 September 1969	Celtic	H	0–1	84,000	
27 September 1969	Partick Thistle	H	2–1	21,000	Willie Henderson, Willie Johnston
4 October 1969	St Johnstone	A	3–1	20,000	Colin Stein (2), Jim Baxter
11 October 1969	Hibernian	H	1–3	54,000	Willie Johnston
25 October 1969	Dunfermline Athletic	H	2–0	32,998	Andy Penman, Kaj Johansen
29 October 1969	Motherwell	A	2–2	25,000	Colin Stein (2)
1 November 1969	Dundee	H	3–1	30,000	Andy Penman (2 [1 Pen]), Willie Johnston
8 November 1969	Airdrieonians	A	3–1	12,000	Andy Penman, Willie Henderson, Willie Johnston
15 November 1969	Kilmarnock	H	5–3	35,499	Colin Stein (3), Andy Penman (Pen), Willie Johnston
22 November 1969	Morton	A	2–2	18,000	Colin Stein, Willie Johnston
29 November 1969	Raith Rovers	H	3–0	25,000	Willie Johnston, Colin Stein, Alex MacDonald
6 December 1969	Heart of Midlothian	A	2–1	36,000	Colin Stein, Willie Johnston
13 December 1969	Dundee United	H	2–1	45,000	Willie Henderson, Colin Stein
20 December 1969	Aberdeen	A	3–2	22,000	Colin Stein (2), Willie Johnston
27 December 1969	Clyde	H	3–0	35,000	Dennis Setterington, Andy Penman (Pen), John Greig
1 January 1970	Partick Thistle	H	3–1	40,000	Willie Johnston, Billy Semple, Colin Stein
3 January 1970	Celtic	A	0–0	75,000	
17 January 1970	Ayr United	H	3–0	32,000	Colin Stein, John Greig, Iain McDonald
31 January 1970	St Mirren	A	4–0	48,000	Colin Stein (2), John Greig, Alex MacDonald
25 February 1970	St Johnstone	H	3–1	25,000	John Greig (2), Billy Semple
28 February 1970	Hibernian	A	2–2	31,332	Colin Stein, John Greig
7 March 1970	Motherwell	H	2–1	31,000	Colin Stein (2)
11 March 1970	Raith Rovers	A	1–2	6,500	Andy Penman
14 March 1970	Dunfermline Athletic	A	1–2	16,000	Colin Stein
21 March 1970	Dundee	A	1–2	17,000	Colin Stein
25 March 1970	Heart of Midlothian	H	3–2	14,000	Andy Penman (2), Willie Johnston
28 March 1970	Airdrieonians	H	1–1	16,700	Andy Penman
31 March 1970	Clyde	A	0–1	14,000	
4 April 1970	Kilmarnock	A	2–2	11,135	John Greig, Willie Henderson
18 April 1970	Morton	H	0–2	20,000	

=== European Cup-Winners Cup ===
Date	Round	Opponent	Venue	Result	Attendance	Scorers
17 September 1969	R1	Steaua Bucharest	H	2–0	43,346	Willie Johnston (2)
1 October 1969	R1	Steaua Bucharest	A	0–0	82,743	
12 November 1969	R2	Gornik Zabrze	A	1–3	72,000	Örjan Persson
26 November 1969	R2	Gornik Zabrze	H	1–3	63,000	Jim Baxter

=== Scottish Cup ===
Date	Round	Opponent	Venue	Result	Attendance	Scorers
24 January 1970	R1	Hibernian	H	3–1	73,716	Alex MacDonald (2), Andy Penman
7 February 1970	R2	Forfar Athletic	A	7–0	10,800	John Greig (2), Alex MacDonald, Colin Stein, Andy Penman, Kaj Johansen (Pen), Sandy Jardine
21 February 1970	QF	Celtic	A	1–3	75,000	Craig (og)

=== League Cup ===
Date	Round	Opponent	Venue	Result	Attendance	Scorers
9 August 1969	SR	Raith Rovers	A	3–2	21,056	Kaj Johansen, Colin Stein, Alex MacDonald
13 August 1969	SR	Celtic	H	2–1	71,645	Örjan Persson, Willie Johnston
16 August 1969	SR	Airdrieonians	A	3–0	23,000	Örjan Persson, Sandy Jardine, Bobby Watson
20 August 1969	SR	Celtic	A	0–1	70,000	
23 August 1969	SR	Raith Rovers	H	3–3	30,000	Andy Penman, Alex MacDonald, Polland (og)
27 August 1969	SR	Airdrieonians	H	3–0	18,000	Colin Stein, Willie Johnston, Andy Penman

== See also ==
- 1969–70 in Scottish football
- 1969–70 Scottish Cup
- 1969–70 Scottish League Cup
- 1969–70 European Cup Winners' Cup
