= Gordon Strachan =

Scottish football coach and former player

Gordon Strachan OBE
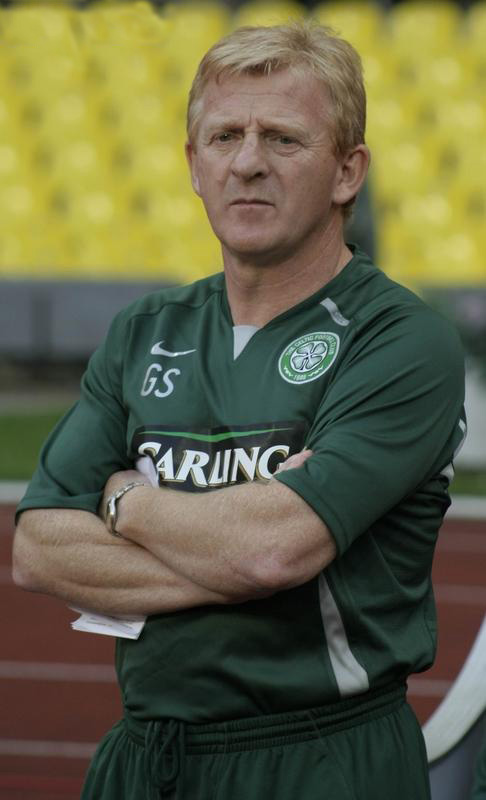
- Strachan as manager of Celtic in 2007

Personal information
- Full name: Gordon David Strachan
- Date of birth: 9 February 1957 (age 69)
- Place of birth: Edinburgh, Scotland
- Height: 5 ft 6 in (1.68 m)
- Position: Midfielder

Team information
- Current team: Dundee (technical director)

Youth career
- 1971–1974: Dundee

Senior career*
Years	Team	Apps	(Gls)
1974–1977	Dundee	69	(13)
1977–1984	Aberdeen	183	(55)
1984–1989	Manchester United	160	(33)
1989–1995	Leeds United	197	(37)
1995–1997	Coventry City	26	(0)
Total		635	(138)

International career
1979	Scotland U21	1	(0)
1980–1992	Scotland	50	(5)

Managerial career
- 1996–2001: Coventry City
- 2001–2004: Southampton
- 2005–2009: Celtic
- 2009–2010: Middlesbrough
- 2013–2017: Scotland
- * Club domestic league appearances and goals

Gordon David Strachan OBE (/ˈstræxən/ born 9 February 1957) is a Scottish former football coach and player who is currently Technical Director of Dundee. He played for Dundee, Aberdeen, Manchester United, Leeds United and Coventry City, as well as the Scotland national team. He has since managed Coventry City, Southampton, Celtic, Middlesbrough and Scotland.

In club football, Strachan played 635 league games, scoring a total of 138 goals, playing 21 of 25 career seasons in either the English or Scottish top-flight. In international football Strachan earned 50 caps, scoring five goals and played in two FIFA World Cup final tournaments, Spain 82 and Mexico 86. Strachan retired from playing in 1997 at age 40, setting a Premier League record for an outfield player.

A right-sided midfielder, Strachan made his senior debut in 1974 with Dundee before moving on within Scotland, to spend seven seasons at Aberdeen. He first played for the Scotland national team in 1980. While at Aberdeen Strachan won multiple domestic league and cup honours in the early 1980s, as well as the 1982–83 European Cup Winners' Cup and 1983 European Super Cup. Moving to England, Strachan won the 1985 FA Cup final in five seasons with Manchester United. He spent the next seven seasons as club captain at Leeds, winning the 1989–90 Second Division and 1991–92 First Division league titles. He played his last game for Scotland in 1992. He moved to Coventry in 1995 for a final three seasons, as a player-coach.

Overall, he made 1,000 appearances in his career.

Strachan became full-time manager of Coventry when the incumbent Ron Atkinson was appointed as director of football. Strachan spent five years as manager of Coventry, but was dismissed in 2001 after the club was relegated from the top-flight for the first time in 34 years. He returned to the Premier League as Southampton manager and guided the club to the 2003 FA Cup final, where they lost 1–0 to Arsenal. Strachan resigned from Southampton in 2004 and took a 16-month break from management. He returned to Scotland to become manager of Celtic, where he achieved three successive league titles and other domestic cup wins. Strachan left Celtic in May 2009 after failing to win a fourth title. He subsequently became manager of Middlesbrough in the English Championship, but left the club after an unsuccessful 12 months in the job. Strachan later managed the Scotland national team for five years, but was unable to secure qualification for a major tournament.

Strachan was named as FWA Footballer of the Year for the 1990–91 season while at Leeds. He was also named Manager of the Year in Scotland several times by writers and players while at Celtic. In 2007, Strachan was inducted into the Scottish Football Hall of Fame. He is the father of Craig Strachan and Gavin Strachan, both of whom were also footballers.

Strachan was appointed an Officer of the Order of the British Empire (OBE) in the 1993 New Year Honours for services to association football.

== Club career ==
Born and raised in Muirhouse, Edinburgh, Strachan supported Hibernian as a boy. His father, Jim, worked as a scaffolder, and his mother, Catherine, worked at a whisky distillery. At age 15, he damaged his vision playing football on the school playground when a pen in his pocket became lodged in his right eye; the pen came within "a thousandth of an inch" of permanently costing him the vision in his eye. He was offered a contract by Hibernian manager Eddie Turnbull, but his father decided against the offer after stating the club did not pay sufficient expenses for footwear.

=== Dundee ===
Strachan began his career with Dundee, having decided to sign with the Scottish club at age 14. In joining the club, he rejected an approach from Manchester United, reasoning he had a better chance to establish himself in the first team at Dens Park. His natural talent was immediately apparent, and he quickly earned a reputation as an outstanding player in the second team, twice winning the Scottish Reserve Player of the Year Award. He made his mark as an 18-year-old when he outplayed Alan Ball in a friendly with Arsenal in August 1975; The Sunday Post compared him to a young Billy Bremner. Strachan became a regular player in the 1975–76 season, the inaugural season of the Scottish Premier Division, featuring in 17 of the club's 36 league matches; however, Dundee were relegated on the last day of the season after rivals Dundee United edged ahead on goal average with an unlikely draw with champions Rangers.

New boss Tommy Gemmell handed 19-year-old Strachan the captaincy for the 1976–77 First Division campaign, and he remains the youngest player to have captained Dundee. Strachan considers his performance as captain as very poor. "I was a pathetic Billy Bremner. I wanted to go about bumping into people, growling at people, shouting at people. And I forgot to be a footballer." The club failed to shine in the lower divisions, and Strachan lost his first-team place early in the 1977–78 season following a drinking session with Jimmy Johnstone; Gemmell was also concerned that Strachan was "getting kicked a lot" after opposition teams worked out that the way to stop Dundee was to take out their playmaker. Strachan decided to leave Dundee as the club seemed unlikely to win back their top-flight status; the Dundee chairman was also keen on cashing in his most prized asset, and told Gemmell that "we need £50,000 by Friday or the banks are closing the gate". His last match for Dundee was on 26 October 1977 in a 6–0 defeat in the League Cup to Queen of the South at Palmerston Park, which Strachan described in his autobiography as "embarrassing".

=== Aberdeen ===
Strachan was signed by Aberdeen manager Billy McNeill in November 1977 for a fee of £50,000 plus Jim Shirra. Poor form and niggling injuries made 1977–78 a mediocre season for Strachan, though the club went on to finish second in the Scottish Premier Division. He was not picked for the 1978 Scottish Cup Final defeat to Rangers. Strachan did win the Scottish 2nd XI Cup with the reserves in 1978.

McNeill left the Pittodrie Stadium for Celtic in summer 1978, and Alex Ferguson was appointed as the new manager. Strachan played at Hampden Park in the 1979 League Cup defeat to Rangers, and set up Duncan Davidson for the game's opening goal. Though the 1978–79 campaign was a disappointment, Aberdeen went on to win the league title in 1979–80 after closing a ten-point deficit over Celtic with a late run that included two victories at Celtic Park. Aberdeen again reached the League Cup Final, defeating both Old Firm sides en route, where they lost 3–0 to Dundee United at Dens Park. At the end of the season, Strachan was elected SFWA Footballer of the Year. After gaining assurance Alex McLeish would also stay with the club, Strachan signed a new contract to keep him at Pittodrie until 1984.

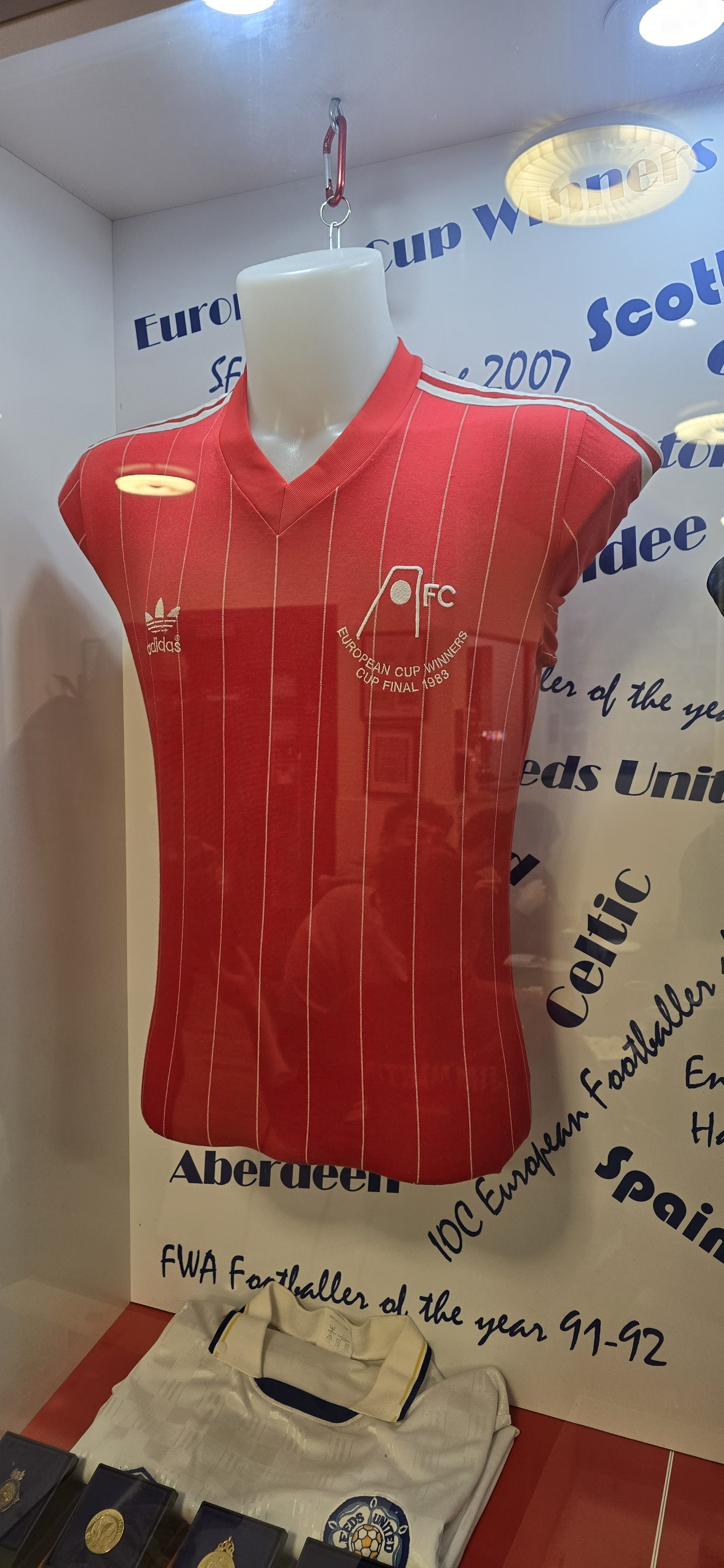
Gordon Strachan's 1983 European Cup Winner's Cup final shirt on display at Spartan FC's HQ at Pilton Edinburgh

Aberdeen could only manage a second-place finish in 1980–81, as Celtic regained the league title. Aberdeen exited the European Cup in the second round with defeat to eventual champions Liverpool; manager Bob Paisley said Strachan would become "Britain's first £2 million player", in what was a (successful) early attempt at mind games. He missed the second half of the season with a muscle tear in his stomach. With fit-again Strachan on the right flank – supported by full-back Stuart Kennedy – and record signing Peter Weir on the left-flank, Aberdeen mounted a genuine title challenge in 1981–82, but had to settle for second place to Celtic. They did though lift the Scottish Cup with a 4–1 extra-time victory over Rangers, with Strachan contributing one assist and one goal.

The 1982–83 campaign was the greatest in the history of the club, and Strachan made his mark early on with four goals in a 5–1 victory at former club Dundee in the League Cup. Despite only finishing third in the league (albeit only one point behind champions and New Firm rivals Dundee United) and exiting the League Cup in the quarter-finals, Aberdeen won the Scottish Cup and the European Cup Winners' Cup. The club's European success came with a 2–1 after-extra-time victory over Spanish giants Real Madrid at Ullevi in Gothenburg. The Scottish Cup came with a 1–0 win over Rangers. Aberdeen continued their success by delivering the league title and Scottish Cup in 1983–84, with Strachan setting up Mark McGhee for the winning goal in the cup final win over Celtic. This completed a unique treble, as they defeated Hamburger SV in the 1983 European Super Cup.

=== Manchester United ===
In August 1984, Manchester United spent £500,000 to take Strachan to Old Trafford. However, because Strachan had previously signed a pre-contract agreement with Bundesliga side 1. FC Köln, United paid £75,000 compensation to resolve the row – teammate Mark McGhee had also signed a contract with Hamburger SV on the understanding that Strachan would also be playing in Germany. Strachan opened the 1984–85 campaign with four goals in seven matches, though the "Red Devils" could only manage a fourth-place finish in the First Division. He featured at Wembley Stadium in the 1985 FA Cup Final, as United ran out 1–0 winners over Everton; his lung-bursting run off-the-ball helped Norman Whiteside to find the space for his extra-time winner.

After winning their opening ten league matches of the 1985–86 season, United had to cope without Strachan, who was sidelined for much of the season with injury. They proved unable to cope with their injuries – another key player facing extended time in the treatment room was Bryan Robson – and limped to another fourth-place finish. Atkinson was replaced by Alex Ferguson in November 1986, and Strachan mocked sobbing as he told his teammates, "I never thought he'd follow me this far south!" After his arrival, Ferguson speculated that no longer being the star player had negatively affected Strachan's form. United finished a disappointing 11th in 1986–87, before rising to second place in 1987–88. Strachan's form was again patchy in 1988–89, as United slipped back down to 11th.

=== Leeds United ===
In March 1989, Sheffield Wednesday manager Ron Atkinson had a bid of £200,000 accepted by Manchester United, and he offered Strachan a contract paying more money than anyone in the club's history. However likely a move to Sheffield seemed, Leeds United manager Howard Wilkinson matched the offer and convinced Strachan to drop down into the Second Division. He quickly became a popular figure at Elland Road, earning comparisons to former players Bobby Collins and Johnny Giles. Signing a two-year contract, he was awarded with the captain's armband. He formed an unlikely midfield partnership with Vinnie Jones and led the club to the Second Division title in 1989–90.

With Leeds now in the First Division, Wilkinson secured a midfield quartet of Strachan, Gary McAllister, David Batty and Gary Speed. They achieved a commendable fourth-place finish in 1990–91, and also reached the semi-finals of the League Cup. Strachan was voted FWA Footballer of the Year for his performances during the campaign, becoming the first player to win the award both in Scotland and in England.

Strachan signed a new two-year contract, before captaining Leeds to the league title in 1991–92. In so doing, he denied former boss Alex Ferguson and Leeds' fierce rivals Manchester United the title. However, Strachan (now nearing age 35) was beginning to feel the effects of his sciatica and missed a number of matches due to his back pain. Following the club's success, Strachan was appointed an OBE for his services to sport.

However, Leeds were unable to build on their success, and finished the 1992–93 season in 17th place in what was newly re-branded as the Premier League. Strachan continued to impress though, and was given the club's Player of the Year award. He scored a hat-trick against Blackburn Rovers on 10 April 1993. This was his second hat-trick for Leeds, the first having come in September 1989 when he found the net three times in a 4–0 win over promotion rivals Swindon Town in the Second Division at Elland Road.

Strachan managed 37 starts in 1993–94, and Leeds rose to fifth. He was rarely selected in the 1994–95 season, which would prove to be the end of his spell at Elland Road, where he had spent six years.

=== Coventry City ===
In March 1995, Strachan moved to Coventry City to work as assistant manager under new manager Ron Atkinson, the man who had brought him south of the border to Manchester United 11 years earlier. It was also agreed he would replace Atkinson as manager in summer 1997. Strachan coached the team and led training sessions while learning the finer points of management from Atkinson. He also took to the field at Highfield Road, playing 26 Premier League matches for the Sky Blues over the next two years before finally retiring in his 40th year. Atkinson signed Aberdeen midfielder Eoin Jess in 1996 purely on the basis of Strachan's recommendation. However, Brazilian strikier Isaías left the club after falling-out with Strachan.

Coventry signed Gary McAllister for £3 million on wages of £20,000 per week; the deal was done by McAllister's former teammate and friend Strachan, while Atkinson was largely opposed to the deal. The club struggled at the start of the 1996–97 campaign, and the club's board of directors asked Atkinson to step aside in November 1996, some months earlier than first agreed, and Strachan was appointed manager.

== International career ==
Strachan won his first cap for Scotland on 16 May 1980, in a British Home Championship defeat to Northern Ireland at Windsor Park. Strachan helped Scotland qualify for the 1982 FIFA World Cup and scored a crucial goal in qualifying by scoring the only goal against Sweden at the Råsunda Stadium in Stockholm. He did not feature in the 1982 British Home Championship, as Jock Stein wanted to rest him for the World Cup, held in Spain. The Scots cruised to a 5–2 victory over New Zealand at La Rosaleda Stadium, Málaga; Strachan was named Man of the Match. Scotland then lost 4–1 to a world-class Brazil side at the Estadio Benito Villamarín, Seville. In the third match, a 2–2 draw with the Soviet Union back in Málaga saw Scotland exit the tournament on goal difference.

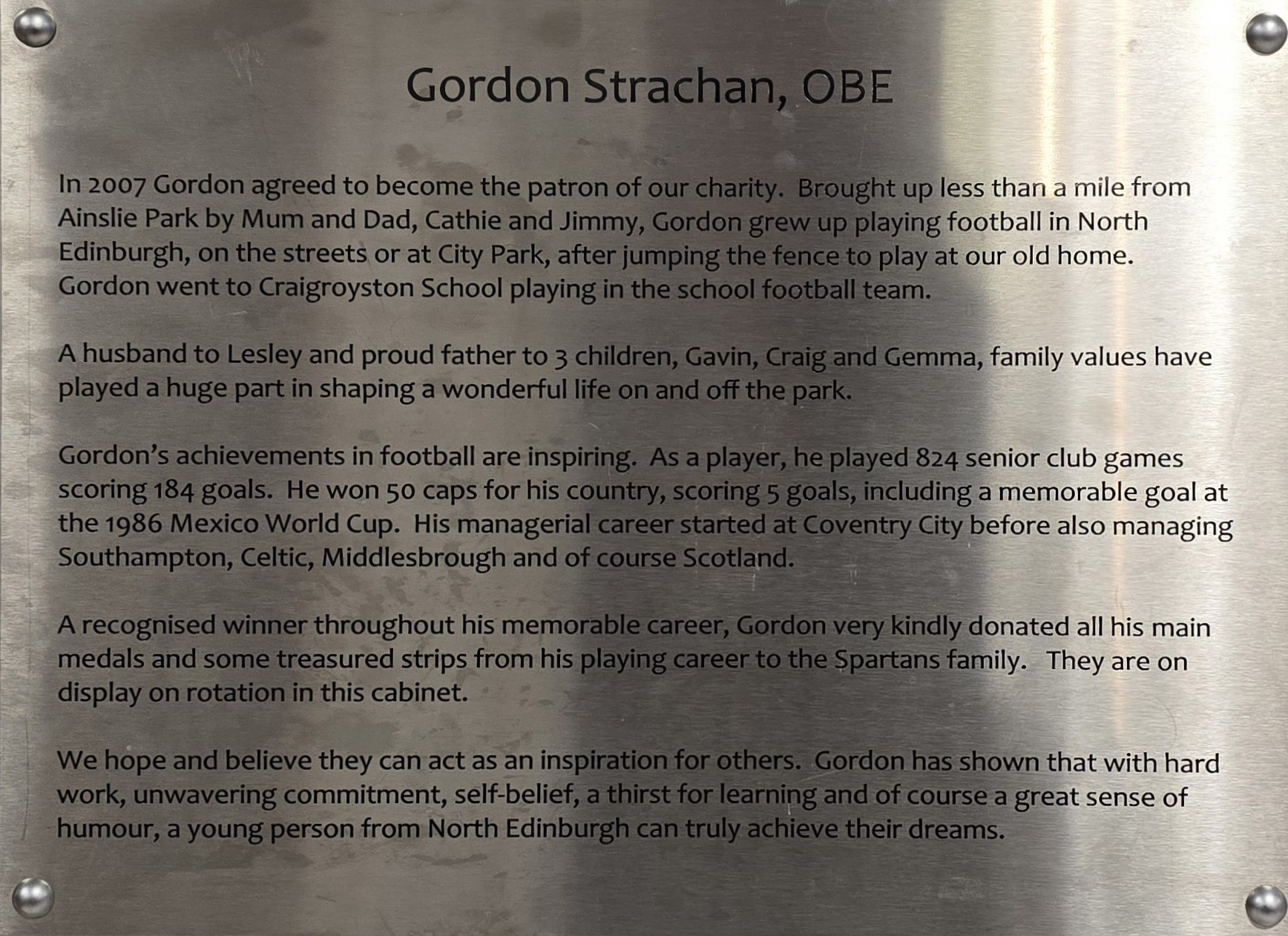
A commemorative plaque to Gordon Strachan at Spartan FC clubhouse in Edinburgh, and marking his gift of medals and football shirts to the club.

Scotland also qualified for the 1986 FIFA World Cup. However, shortly after the draw with Wales at Ninian Park on 10 September 1985, Jock Stein died of a heart attack, and his assistant Alex Ferguson took charge for the World Cup campaign. To complete their qualification, they had to beat Australia in a play-off. Strachan played in the first leg at Hampden Park, but did not travel to Melbourne for the second leg. The Scots faced a tough draw in Mexico and lost their opening match 1–0 at the Estadio Neza 86 in the Mexico City suburb of Nezahualcóyotl to the unseeded – but highly fancied – Denmark. Strachan then scored in a 2–1 defeat to West Germany at the Estadio Corregidora in Queretaro; his goal celebration was memorable, as he tried to climb the advertising hoardings, but was thwarted by his short stature and so merely rested his leg on the hoarding before he was joined by his teammates. In the third and final group match back in Nezahualcóyotl, Scotland drew 0–0 with Uruguay despite their opponents going down to ten men after less than a minute of play when José Batista attempted to take Strachan out of the game.

Strachan fell out of the first team picture under Andy Roxburgh, and was omitted from the squad for the 1990 World Cup. Nevertheless, he enjoyed a national team revival between 1990 and 1992, and captained his country in qualification for UEFA Euro 1992. However, he did not travel to Sweden as a member of the squad, as he announced his retirement due to long-term back troubles. He won 50 full caps, and scored five international goals.

== Managerial career ==
=== Coventry City ===
When Ron Atkinson became Coventry City's director of football in November 1996, Strachan was promoted to a player manager position. He appointed Alex Miller as his assistant. After an upturn in results, Strachan was named Manager of the Month in December. However, 1 win in 12 matches in the New Year left the "Sky Blues" in the relegation zone. Late wins over Liverpool, Chelsea and Tottenham Hotspur saved their season though, and relegation was avoided by a one-point margin. Strachan played in the win over Chelsea at Highfield Road at age 40, in what was at the time a record age for an outfield player in the Premier League.

Strachan signed Swedish goalkeeper Magnus Hedman and defender Roland Nilsson, Dutch midfielder George Boateng, and Romanian striker Viorel Moldovan – all of whom would win international caps. Coventry rose to 11th place in 1997–98, and also reached the quarter-finals of the 1997–98 FA Cup. After Miller left the club, Strachan replaced him with Garry Pendrey, who would go on to spend many years as his assistant at various clubs. Strachan was again named Manager of the Month in February 1998.

The club finished 15th in 1998–99 and 14th in 1999–2000, as Strachan spent £6 million on Irish striker Robbie Keane and £5 million on Moroccans Mustapha Hadji and Youssef Chippo, while selling Dion Dublin to Midlands rivals Aston Villa. Coventry were relegated at the end of the 2000–01 season, making Strachan unpopular with fans. New signing Craig Bellamy proved disappointing, while Robbie Keane was sold and Gary McAllister departed for Liverpool. Strachan attempted to launch a promotion campaign by signing striker Lee Hughes, but in the face of increasing supporter unrest, he was dismissed after five matches of the 2001–02 First Division campaign. His replacement, Roland Nilsson, took the club to an 11th-place finish.

=== Southampton ===
Strachan returned to management within weeks, taking the manager's job at Premier League Southampton, who had sacked manager Stuart Gray after a terrible start to their first season at the new St Mary's Stadium. Most pundits had already written off their survival chances by the time of Strachan's appointment in October 2001, but he turned round their fortunes and they finished 11th in the Premier League. The Saints progressed further in 2002–03 when they finished eighth and reached the FA Cup Final, where they lost 1–0 to Arsenal. As Arsenal had already qualified for the 2003–04 UEFA Champions League, Southampton won a place in the UEFA Cup.

In February 2004, Strachan announced his resignation as Southampton manager after his decision not to stay on at the club in the summer was leaked to the press. He wanted to take a break from football, but was forced to resign earlier than initially intended due to the speculation surrounding his and the club's future following the leak.

=== Celtic ===
After a 16-month break, Strachan returned to management on 1 June 2005, when he succeeded Martin O'Neill as manager of Celtic in the Scottish Premier League (SPL). For 2005–06, his stated aim was to regain the SPL title from rivals Rangers. He had an embarrassing start to his campaign as Celtic manager, losing 5–0 to Slovak champions Artmedia Bratislava on 27 July 2005 and three days later, drawing 4–4 with Motherwell in his first SPL match in charge of the Glasgow club. The loss against Artmedia meant Celtic suffered an early exit from European competition, despite winning the return match 4–0. After this disastrous start, Celtic started to improve under Strachan. A low-point was the shock defeat in the third round of the Scottish Cup to First Division Clyde on 8 January 2006. However, the following month his team made history when they defeated Dunfermline Athletic 8–1, a record victory margin for the SPL at the time. Strachan's first season was ultimately successful as he coached Celtic to victory in the League Cup and, on 5 April 2006, his side clinched the SPL title in record time and with six matches remaining. Reflecting this achievement, Strachan was voted Manager of the Year by the Scottish Football Writers' Association eight days later.

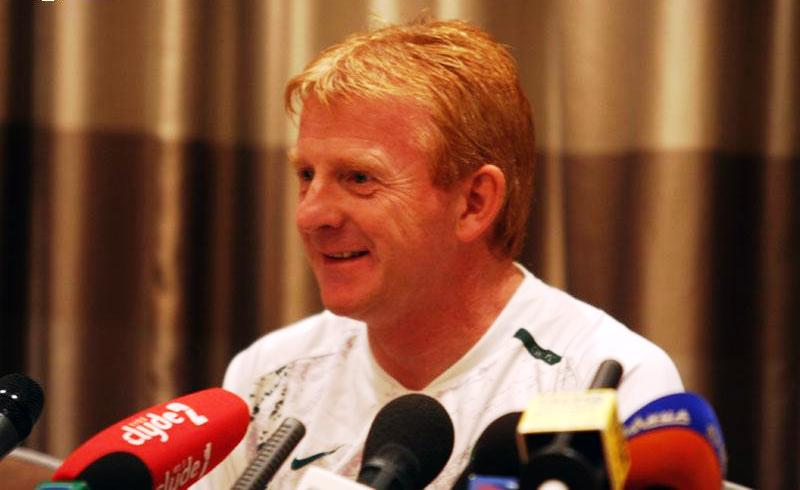
Strachan ahead of Celtic's Champions League qualifier against Spartak Moscow, August 2007

The following year, Strachan restructured the team and made a series of signings, bringing in players such as Hibernian's Derek Riordan; Chelsea's Jiří Jarošík; Kenny Miller and Lee Naylor from Wolverhampton Wanderers; Jan Vennegoor of Hesselink from PSV; Thomas Gravesen from Real Madrid; and Paul Hartley and Steven Pressley from Hearts. Celtic flourished and by mid-January 2007 held a 17-point lead in the SPL table. UEFA Champions League football again returned to Celtic Park, the team having automatically qualified for the group stages and drawn alongside Benfica, Copenhagen and Manchester United. Home victories against all three Group F members saw the team progress to the round of 16 of the Champions League for the first time since the competition was re-formatted in 1993. Celtic lost their round of 16 tie against eventual winners Milan in extra time, missing out on a place in the quarter-finals. On 22 April 2007, Strachan guided Celtic to their 41st league championship, and second in succession. A 2–1 victory against Kilmarnock left Celtic 13 points clear of Rangers with four matches remaining. Later that day, Strachan was recognised as the inaugural PFA Scotland Manager of the Year for 2007. Celtic went on to win the Scottish Cup, beating Dunfermline Athletic.

In the 2007–08 season, Strachan led Celtic into the round of 16 of the UEFA Champions League again after defeating Milan, Benfica and Shakhtar Donetsk. By April, there was significant criticism from the press and the fans after a 1–0 loss to Aberdeen in the Scottish Cup quarter-final and a 1–0 loss to ten-man Motherwell in the SPL. However, after defeating Rangers twice at home, on 22 May 2008 Strachan became only the third ever Celtic manager to guide the club to three consecutive Scottish league titles.

In the 2008–09 season, after winning the League Cup after extra time against Rangers, but failing to lead Celtic to another league title, he resigned as manager on 25 May 2009.

=== Middlesbrough ===
Strachan signed a four-year contract with English Championship team Middlesbrough on 26 October 2009, succeeding Gareth Southgate. He had been linked with the Middlesbrough manager's job 15 years earlier, when still a Leeds United player. His first match in charge was on 31 October, a 1–0 defeat to Plymouth Argyle, with Adam Johnson missing a penalty. On 5 December, Middlesbrough won their first match under Strachan, 5–1 away to Queens Park Rangers. After a poor run of results, including a 3–0 loss at home to Blackpool and a 1–0 loss at home to Cardiff City, Strachan earned his first home win after his team beat Scunthorpe United 3–0.

After a poor start to the 2010–11 season meant Middlesbrough were in 20th place, Strachan left the club by mutual consent on 18 October. He voluntarily ended his contract and left without compensation.

=== Scotland ===
Strachan was appointed manager of the Scotland national team on 15 January 2013, succeeding Craig Levein. His first match in charge was at Pittodrie Stadium in a friendly match against Estonia on 6 February. The game ended 1–0 to Scotland, with Charlie Mulgrew getting his first international goal. Scotland suffered defeats to Wales and Serbia in Strachan's first two competitive matches, which ended the Scots' slim chances of qualification for the 2014 World Cup. After this, Scotland had an upturn in form, winning both matches against Croatia and away against Macedonia. Scotland finished fourth in qualifying Group A.

In Euro 2016 qualifying, Scotland appeared to have a better chance of qualification as the finals tournament was expanded from 16 teams to 24, but were drawn in a tough group with Germany, Poland and the Republic of Ireland. After losing their opening match in Germany, Scotland recorded home wins against Georgia, Ireland and Gibraltar, and away draws against Poland and Ireland. In their following match, Scotland produced an "insipid" performance, as they lost 1–0 in Georgia. A home defeat by Germany left Scotland four points behind third-placed Ireland, with two matches to play. In the penultimate matches of the group, Scotland needed to beat Poland, or hope that Ireland would lose to Germany. Scotland came from behind to lead 2–1 in their match, but Ireland had scored the only goal of their match, leaving the Scots needing a win to stay alive. A late scrambled goal by Robert Lewandowski gave Poland a draw that eliminated Scotland from contention. Strachan bemoaned what he perceived to be bad luck. After a win against Gibraltar in the last qualifier, Strachan agreed to a new contract with the Scottish Football Association. After failing to qualify for the 2018 FIFA World Cup, Strachan resigned from his position on 12 October 2017.

== Management style ==
Typically playing a traditional 4–4–2 formation, and very occasionally 4–5–1, Strachan is known for his rigorous management style. He also places great emphasis on player health and fitness, forbidding his players to drink alcohol excessively or regularly, and often giving dietary advice to his players, attributing his own longevity as a player to a strict and somewhat unusual diet involving seaweed. Players such as Scotland international Gary Caldwell have attributed their success at Celtic to lifestyle changes enforced by Strachan.

Renowned for his deadpan humour in media interviews, quotes attributed to Strachan have become part of popular football culture.

=== Enmity with Alex Ferguson ===
As a manager Strachan continued an ongoing public feud with Alex Ferguson, that dated back to Strachan's playing days under Ferguson at two clubs. In his 1999 autobiography, Ferguson said, "I decided this man could not be trusted an inch – I would not want to expose my back to him in a hurry." Strachan's reaction to the attack, in his own 2006 autobiography, My Life in Football, was one of being "surprised and disappointed", although he suspected that Ferguson had helped to relegate Strachan's Coventry City in 2001 by fielding a weakened Manchester United team in a match against Derby County. In August 2006, after his Celtic team was drawn to play Ferguson's Manchester United in the Champions League, Strachan said that there was no longer any enmity between them.

Their enmity dates from Strachan's time playing under Ferguson, first at Aberdeen and later Manchester United. Ferguson claimed that their relationship broke down when Strachan signed an agreement with German club FC Köln without telling Ferguson, although Strachan ended up signing with Manchester United in 1984. Strachan, while admitting that he had not handled the transfer in the best way, defended the move since he was increasingly disenchanted with Ferguson's coaching, saying "I needed him to treat me as an adult, not a kid; to have some respect for the fact that I was an experienced professional to whom abuse from the manager had become more of a motivational turn-off than a stimulus". Strachan said that he "loved playing for Ron Atkinson at Manchester United. After being beaten with a big stick for so long at Aberdeen, it was refreshing to have a manager who trusted and appreciated me, and treated me as an adult. When Fergie moved to United, I had to endure the big stick again". With Ferguson having joined Manchester United in November 1986, he thought that Strachan did not play for United with the same confidence he had in Scotland and subsequently sold him to Leeds United in 1989. Strachan enjoyed significant success with Leeds as a veteran player, helping them win the 1991–92 English league championship in a title race with Ferguson's United.

== Other work ==
Strachan has analysed football matches for the media, including alongside Adrian Chiles on BBC Sport's Match of the Day 2. He has worked as a regular pundit for ITV's coverage of the FA Cup and the UEFA Champions League. During the 2014 World Cup, he worked as a pundit for ITV. In April 2019, Strachan apologised for remarks he made during The Debate on Sky Sports. Following the release of convicted sex offender Adam Johnson from prison, Strachan had appeared to suggest that abusing Johnson for that offence was comparable with racial abuse.

For the 2006 World Cup, Strachan was appointed as the official FIFA Ambassador for Scotland, joining 50 others in fundraising for SOS Children's Villages, the official charity of the tournament.

Strachan and his two sons started their own football school in the Coventry area in August 2009.

In July 2019, Strachan was appointed to a technical director position with Dundee.

== Personal life ==
Strachan married Lesley Scott in 1977; George Mackie was his best man. Together, they had three children: sons Craig and Gavin Strachan, also footballers, and a daughter.

== Career statistics ==
=== Club ===
Appearances and goals by club, season and competition
Club	Season	League			National cup (Note: Includes Scottish Cup, FA Cup)		League cup (Note: Includes Scottish League Cup, Football League Cup)		Continental		Other		Total	
Club	Season	Division	Apps	Goals	Apps	Goals	Apps	Goals	Apps	Goals	Apps	Goals	Apps	Goals
Dundee	1973–74	Scottish First Division	0	0	0	0	1	0	0	0	–		1	0
Dundee	1974–75	Scottish First Division	1	0	0	0	1	0	0	0	–		2	0
Dundee	1975–76	Scottish Premier Division	23	6	1	0	6	0	0	0	–		30	6
Dundee	1976–77	Scottish First Division	36	7	6	1	0	0	–		–		42	8
Dundee	1977–78	Scottish First Division	9	0	0	0	5	1	–		–		14	1
Dundee	Total		69	13	7	1	13	1	0	0	–		89	15
Aberdeen	1977–78	Scottish Premier Division	12	1	4	0	0	0	0	0	–		16	1
Aberdeen	1978–79	Scottish Premier Division	31	5	4	0	8	0	3 (Note: Appearances in European Cup Winners' Cup)	1	–		46	6
Aberdeen	1979–80	Scottish Premier Division	33	10	5	1	11	4	2 (Note: Appearances in UEFA Cup)	0	–		51	15
Aberdeen	1980–81	Scottish Premier Division	20	6	0	0	6	3	4 (Note: Appearances in European Cup)	0	–		30	9
Aberdeen	1981–82	Scottish Premier Division	30	7	6	4	8	6	6	3	–		50	20
Aberdeen	1982–83	Scottish Premier Division	32	12	3	0	7	7	10	1	–		52	20
Aberdeen	1983–84	Scottish Premier Division	25	13	7	2	6	0	7	3	2 (Note: Appearances in European Super Cup)	0	47	18
Aberdeen	Total		183	54	29	7	46	20	32	8	2	0	292	89
Manchester United	1984–85	First Division	41	15	7	2	2	0	6	2	–		56	19
Manchester United	1985–86	First Division	28	5	5	0	1	0	–		4 (Note: One appearance in FA Charity Shield, three appearances in Football League Super Cup)	0	38	5
Manchester United	1986–87	First Division	34	4	2	0	2	0	–		–		38	4
Manchester United	1987–88	First Division	36	8	3	0	5	1	–		–		44	9
Manchester United	1988–89	First Division	21	1	6	0	3	0	–		0	0	30	1
Manchester United	Total		160	33	23	2	13	1	6	2	4	0	206	38
Leeds United	1988–89	Second Division	11	3	0	0	0	0	—		—		11	3
Leeds United	1989–90	Second Division	46	16	1	0	2	1	—		—		49	17
Leeds United	1990–91	First Division	34	7	6	1	7	1	—		—		47	9
Leeds United	1991–92	First Division	36	4	0	0	4	1	—		—		40	5
Leeds United	1992–93	Premier League	31	4	4	0	3	1	5 (Note: Appearances in UEFA Champions League)	1	1 (Note: Appearance in FA Charity Shield)	0	44	6
Leeds United	1993–94	Premier League	33	3	3	1	2	0	—		—		38	4
Leeds United	1994–95	Premier League	6	0	0	0	1	0	—		—		7	0
Leeds United	Total		197	37	14	2	19	4	5	1	1	0	236	44
Coventry City	1994–95	Premier League	5	0	—		—		—		—		5	0
Coventry City	1995–96	Premier League	12	0	2	0	3	0	—		—		17	0
Coventry City	1996–97	Premier League	9	0	1	0	1	0	—		—		11	0
Coventry City	Total		26	0	3	0	4	0	—		—		33	0
Career total			635	137	76	12	95	26	43	11	7	0	856	186

=== International ===
Appearances and goals by national team and year
National team	Year	Apps	Goals
Scotland	1980	7	1
Scotland	1981	2	0
Scotland	1982	8	0
Scotland	1983	9	1
Scotland	1984	2	0
Scotland	1985	5	0
Scotland	1986	6	2
Scotland	1987	2	0
Scotland	1989	2	0
Scotland	1991	5	1
Scotland	1992	2	0
Total		50	5

==== International goals ====
Scores and results list Scotland's goal tally first, score column indicates score after each Strachan goal.

List of international goals scored by Gordon Strachan
No.	Date	Venue	Cap	Opponent	Score	Result	Competition
1	10 September 1980	Råsunda Stadium, Stockholm, Sweden	6	Sweden	1–0	1–0	1982 FIFA World Cup qualification
2	12 June 1983	Empire Stadium, Vancouver, Canada	22	Canada	1–0	2–0	Friendly
3	26 March 1986	Hampden Park, Glasgow, Scotland	34	Romania	1–0	3–0	Friendly
4	8 June 1986	Estadio La Corregidora, Queretaro, Mexico	36	West Germany	1–0	1–2	1986 FIFA World Cup
5	1 May 1991	Stadio Olimpico, Serravalle, San Marino	46	San Marino	1–0	2–0	UEFA Euro 1992 qualifying

=== Managerial record ===
As of 8 October 2017 (competitive club matches and all international matches)

Team	From	To	Record				
Team	From	To	G	W	D	L	Win %
Coventry City	5 November 1996	10 September 2001	215	70	56	89	32.56
Southampton	22 October 2001	13 February 2004	110	39	32	39	35.45
Celtic	1 June 2005	25 May 2009	182	122	28	32	67.03
Middlesbrough	26 October 2009	18 October 2010	46	13	13	20	28.26
Scotland	15 January 2013	12 October 2017	40	19	9	12	47.50
Total			593	263	138	192	44.35

== Honours ==
=== Player ===
Aberdeen

- Scottish Premier Division: 1979–80, 1983–84
- Scottish Cup: 1981–82, 1982–83, 1983–84
- Drybrough Cup: 1980–81
- European Cup Winners' Cup: 1982–83
- European Super Cup: 1983

Manchester United

- FA Cup: 1984–85

Leeds United

- Football League First Division: 1991–92
- Football League Second Division: 1989–90
- FA Charity Shield: 1992

Scotland

- The Rous Cup: 1985

Individual

- SFWA Footballer of the Year: 1979–80
- Ballon d'Or: 1983 (4th place)
- PFA Team of the Year: 1989–90 Second Division, 1990–91 First Division
- FWA Footballer of the Year: 1990–91
- Scottish FA International Roll of Honour: 1992
- Leeds United Player of the Year: 1993
- PFA Merit Award: 1995
- English Football Hall of Fame inductee: 2016

=== Manager ===
Southampton

- FA Cup runner-up: 2002–03

Celtic

- Scottish Premier League: 2005–06, 2006–07, 2007–08
- Scottish Cup: 2006–07
- Scottish League Cup: 2005–06, 2008–09

Individual

- Premier League Manager of the Month: December 1996, February 1998, January 2002, December 2002
- SPFA Manager of the Year: 2005–06
- SFWA Manager of the Year: 2005–06, 2006–07
- PFA Scotland Manager of the Year: 2006–07, 2008–09

== See also ==
- List of Scotland national football team captains
- List of Scottish football families
