= Dave Souter =

Scottish footballer (1940–2020)

Personal information
- Date of birth: 30 March 1940
- Place of birth: Dundee, Scotland
- Date of death: 11 March 2020 (aged 79)
- Positions: Winger; left back

Senior career*
Years	Team	Apps	(Gls)
–1959	Carnoustie Panmure		
1959	→ Dundee United (trialist)	1	(0)
1959–1961	Arbroath		
1961–1962	Berwick Rangers	4	(1)
1962	East Fife	5	(0)
1962–1964	Arbroath		
1964–1970	Clyde	104	(7)
1970–1971	Dundee	10	(0)
- Arbroath Victoria
Total		124	(8)
- * Club domestic league appearances and goals

Dave Souter (30 March 1940 – 11 March 2020) was a Scottish professional footballer.
