= George Falconer (footballer) =

Scottish footballer (1946–2013)

George Falconer (23 November 1946 – 3 January 2013) was a Scottish footballer who played as a forward.

Falconer was best known for his time at Raith Rovers making 68 appearances and scoring 22 goals, he also played for Montrose, Dundee and Forfar Athletic in the Scottish Football League and Elgin City in the Highland Football League.

Falconer died on 3 January 2013, aged 68, from a heart attack.
