= George Mackie (footballer) =

Scottish footballer

Personal information
- Date of birth: 18 May 1954 (age 72)
- Place of birth: Edinburgh, Scotland
- Positions: Defender; midfielder

Senior career*
Years	Team	Apps	(Gls)
- Salvesen B.C.
1975–1976	Dundee	15	(0)
1976–1980	Partick Thistle	53	(0)
1980	B 1909		
1980–1981	Albion Rovers	15	(1)
1981–1985	Brechin City	118	(15)
1985–1988	Arbroath	82	(2)
Total		283	(18)
- * Club domestic league appearances and goals

George Mackie (born 18 May 1954) is a Scottish former professional footballer who played as a defender and midfielder.

== Career ==
Born in Edinburgh, Mackie began his career at Salvesen B.C., before playing in the Scottish Football League for Dundee, Partick Thistle, Albion Rovers, Brechin City and Arbroath.

He also played in Denmark for B 1909.
