= Bobby Hutchinson =

Scottish footballer

Personal information
- Date of birth: 19 June 1953 (age 73)
- Place of birth: Glasgow, Scotland
- Height: 5 ft 9 in (1.75 m)
- Position: Midfielder

Senior career*
| Years | Team | Apps | (Gls) |
| 1971–1974 | Montrose | 41 | (8) |
| 1974–1977 | Dundee | 88 | (25) |
| 1977–1980 | Hibernian | 67 | (13) |
| 1980–1981 | Wigan Athletic | 35 | (3) |
| 1981–1982 | Tranmere Rovers | 35 | (6) |
| 1982–1983 | Mansfield Town | 35 | (3) |
| 1983–1984 | Tranmere Rovers | 21 | (4) |
| 1984–1986 | Bristol City | 92 | (10) |
| 1986–1988 | Walsall | 16 | (0) |
| 1987 | → Blackpool (loan) | 6 | (0) |
| 1988 | → Carlisle United (loan) | 13 | (2) |
- * Club domestic league appearances and goals

Bobby Hutchinson (born 19 June 195) is a Scottish former professional footballer.

He lifted the Associate Members' Cup on 24 May 1986 at Wembley Stadium as Bristol City beat Bolton Wanderers 3–0 in the final.

== Honours ==
Bristol City

- Associate Members' Cup: 1985–86

Individual

- PFA Team of the Year: 1986–87 Third Division
