= Alex Caldwell (footballer, born 1954) =

Scottish footballer and manager

Alex Caldwell (born 23 October 1954) is a Scottish former football player and manager. He played for Dundee, St Johnstone and Forfar Athletic in the Scottish Football League. Caldwell managed Elgin City from 2000 until 2002. Before joining Elgin, Caldwell had been assistant manager to Steve Paterson at Inverness Caledonian Thistle, and was involved in their shock Scottish Cup victory against Celtic in 2000.
