= Thomson Allan =

Scottish footballer (born 1946)

Personal information
- Full name: Thomson Sandlands Allan
- Date of birth: 5 October 1946 (age 80)
- Place of birth: Longridge, Scotland
- Height: 1.78 m (5 ft 10 in)
- Position: Goalkeeper

Youth career
- Edina Hibs

Senior career*
Years	Team	Apps	(Gls)
1963–1971	Hibernian	70	(0)
1967	→ Toronto City (loan)	12	(0)
1971–1979	Dundee	159	(0)
1979	→ Meadowbank Thistle (loan)	2	(0)
1979–1980	Heart of Midlothian	24	(0)
1980–1983	Falkirk	12	(0)
1983	East Stirlingshire	1	(0)
Total		280	(0)

International career
1974	Scotland	2	(0)
- * Club domestic league appearances and goals

Thomson Sandlands Allan (born 5 October 1946) is a Scottish former professional footballer who played as a goalkeeper.

Allan began his career at Hibernian in 1963, where he was a League Cup runner-up in 1968-69. He joined Dundee in 1971 and collected his only winner's medal at Hampden Park, when the Dark Blues defeated Celtic 1–0 in the 1973 Scottish League Cup Final.

Allan was called up to the Scotland squad that season, earning his only two caps in warm-up matches for the 1974 FIFA World Cup. He was selected in the squad for West Germany but was considered back-up to Leeds United's David Harvey and did not play during the tournament.

Allan reverted to part-time status when he started working at British Leyland's Bathgate plant and wound down his career with brief spells at Meadowbank Thistle, Heart of Midlothian, Falkirk and East Stirlingshire before retiring in 1983.
