= Duncan Lambie =

Scottish footballer (1952–2015)

Personal information
- Date of birth: 20 April 1952
- Place of birth: Whitburn, Scotland
- Date of death: 2015 (aged 62–63)
- Position: Left winger

Youth career
- Armadale Thistle

Senior career*
Years	Team	Apps	(Gls)
1970–1974	Dundee	71	(8)
1974–1977	St Johnstone	70	(8)
1977–1978	SpVgg. Fürth	71	(6)
1978–1980	Hibernian	16	(0)
Total		228	(22)
- * Club domestic league appearances and goals

Duncan Lambie (20 April 1952 – December 2015) was a Scottish footballer, who played for Dundee, St Johnstone, SpVgg. Fürth, and Hibernian.
