= Bobby Robinson (footballer, born 1950) =

Scottish footballer

Personal information
- Full name: Robert Sharp Robinson
- Date of birth: 10 November 1950
- Place of birth: Edinburgh, Scotland
- Date of death: 24 December 1996 (aged 46)
- Position: Midfielder

Senior career*
| Years | Team | Apps | (Gls) |
| 1969–1972 | Falkirk | 16 | (2) |
| 1972–1978 | Dundee | 149 | (16) |
| 1978–1979 | Dundee United | 30 | (0) |
| 1979–1981 | Hearts | 54 | (1) |
| 1981–1983 | Raith Rovers | 49 | (3) |
| Total | | 298 | (22) |

International career
| 1974 | Scotland U23 | 1 | (1) |
| 1974–1975 | Scotland | 4 | (0) |
- * Club domestic league appearances and goals

Robert Sharp Robinson (10 November 1950 – 24 December 1996) was a Scottish international footballer, who played as a midfielder. Beginning his career with Falkirk, Robinson went on to spend around half his career with Dundee, winning four caps for Scotland during his time at Dens Park. Later playing for city rivals Dundee United, Robinson moved on to Hearts and Raith Rovers, ending his senior career with Raith in 1983. Robinson played just under 300 league matches during his fourteen-year career.

In 1989, he joined Dundee United's reserve team to help develop the team's younger players. After his football career, Robinson was a teacher in Kirriemuir and Brechin. He died after a long illness in 1996 at the age of 46.
