= Gordon Wallace (footballer, born 1943) =

Scottish footballer (1943–2026)

Personal information
- Full name: George Gordon Wallace
- Date of birth: 20 June 1943
- Place of birth: Dundee, Scotland
- Date of death: 13 March 2026 (aged 82)
- Position: Forward

Senior career*
Years	Team	Apps	(Gls)
1962–1966	Montrose	132	(75)
1966–1970	Raith Rovers	102	(59)
1970–1976	Dundee	197	(89)
1976	Seattle Sounders	21	(12)
1976–1978	Dundee United	40	(16)
1978	Seattle Sounders	24	(8)
1978–1980	Raith Rovers	65	(25)
Total		581	(284)

Managerial career
- 1978–1983: Raith Rovers
- 1989–1991: Dundee
- 1995: Dundee United (caretaker)
- * Club domestic league appearances and goals

George Gordon Wallace (20 June 1943 – 13 March 2026) was a Scottish professional football player and coach. A forward, he was a record-setting goal-scorer in the Scottish league, and was named Scottish Football Writers' Player of the Year for 1967–68. Wallace was employed in an advisory position with Dundee F.C.

== Career ==
A native of Dundee, Wallace began his career in 1961 with Montrose. He went on to play for Raith Rovers, Dundee, and Dundee United. He also played in the NASL for two seasons with the Seattle Sounders, 1976 and 1978.

Wallace once held the Scottish record of 264 league career goals scored, a tally since passed by Ally McCoist. He scored 30 in 1967–68 to be awarded footballer of the year by the Scottish press, the first non Old Firm player to win the award. Despite this achievement, Wallace was never capped for Scotland. He followed his playing days by going into coaching and management of a number of Scottish clubs, including Raith, Dundee, Dundee United and Dunfermline in a career spanning 45 years in football.

== Later life and death ==
Wallace also worked as a summariser for Dundee radio station Radio Tay.

He died on 13 March 2026, at the age of 82.

== Honours ==
=== Player ===
- Scottish League Cup: 1973–74

=== Manager ===
- Scottish Challenge Cup: 1990–91

=== Individual ===
- SFWA Footballer of the Year: 1967–68

== See also ==
- List of footballers in Scotland by number of league appearances (500+)
- List of footballers in Scotland by number of league goals (200+)
