= Bobby Ford (Scottish footballer) =

Scottish footballer (born 1949)

Personal information
- Date of birth: 14 December 1949 (age 76)
- Place of birth: Edinburgh, Scotland
- Position: Midfielder

Youth career
- Melbourne Thistle

Senior career*
Years	Team	Apps	(Gls)
1968–1971	Falkirk	39	(2)
1971–1978	Dundee	187	(10)
1978–1979	Montrose	25	(1)
1979–1982	Raith Rovers	119	(12)
1982–1983	Dunfermline Athletic	10	(0)
1983	Meadowbank Thistle	13	(1)
- Postal United
Total		393	(26)

Managerial career
- 1988-?: Armadale Thistle
- 1998-?: Armadale Thistle
- * Club domestic league appearances and goals

Bobby Ford (born 14 December 1949) is a Scottish footballer, who played for Falkirk, Dundee, Montrose, Raith Rovers, Dunfermline Athletic and Meadowbank Thistle.

In 2024, having played over 250 games and winning the 1973 Scottish League Cup with the club, Ford was inducted in the Dundee F.C. Hall of Fame.
