= John Duncan (footballer) =

Scottish footballer and manager (1949–2022)

Personal information
- Full name: John Pearson Duncan
- Date of birth: 22 February 1949
- Place of birth: Dundee, Scotland
- Date of death: 8 October 2022 (aged 73)
- Position: Forward

Youth career
- Broughty Athletic

Senior career*
Years	Team	Apps	(Gls)
1968–1975	Dundee	121	(64)
1975–1979	Tottenham Hotspur	103	(53)
1979–1981	Derby County	36	(12)
1981–1983	Scunthorpe United	9	(0)
Total		269	(129)

International career
1973	Scottish League XI	1	(2)

Managerial career
- 1981–1983: Scunthorpe United
- 1983: Hartlepool United
- 1983–1987: Chesterfield
- 1987–1990: Ipswich Town
- 1993–2000: Chesterfield
- 2007–2011: Loughborough University
- * Club domestic league appearances and goals

John Pearson Duncan (22 February 1949 – 8 October 2022) was a Scottish football player and manager. He guided Chesterfield to the FA Cup semi-finals in 1997.

== Playing career ==
Born in Dundee, Duncan played as a forward for Dundee, Tottenham Hotspur, Derby County, Scunthorpe United, and also represented the Scottish League XI.

== Managerial career ==
Duncan managed Scunthorpe United, Hartlepool United, Chesterfield and Ipswich Town.

Duncan's first managerial role was at Scunthorpe United. After a brief spell at Hartlepool United, Duncan was appointed Chesterfield manager in the summer of 1983 and led them to the Fourth Division title in 1985. After keeping the club in the Third Division the following season, he was appointed Ipswich Town manager in the summer of 1986 following their relegation to the Second Division.

Duncan led Ipswich to top-half finishes in the Second Division but was dismissed in 1990 after failing to lead promotion challenges. After leaving Ipswich, Duncan became a teacher at a Suffolk school before returning to Chesterfield in February 1993. In his second spell at the club, Chesterfield won the Division Three playoffs in 1995 and reached the FA Cup semi-finals in 1996–97, losing to Middlesbrough in a replay.

Duncan was dismissed by Chesterfield in April 2000 after their relegation back to Division Three. He was awarded a testimonial by Chesterfield in 2002.

Duncan spent four seasons managing Loughborough University from 2007, winning the Midland Combination League Cup in 2008 and the League title and promotion to the Midland Football Alliance in 2009.

Duncan joined the League Managers Association in 2009, eventually becoming technical manager.

== Legacy ==
The League Managers Association named an award in honour of him in 2023, the LMA John Duncan Award. The award is given to an individual chosen by the LMA board who has either accomplished something significant in the field of football or stands for the values of passion and service to football that he embodied. The inaugural award winner was Lou Macari.

== Honours ==
=== As a manager ===
Chesterfield

- Football League Third Division play-offs: 1995
- Football League Fourth Division: 1984–85
