= David White (Scottish footballer) =

Scottish footballer and manager

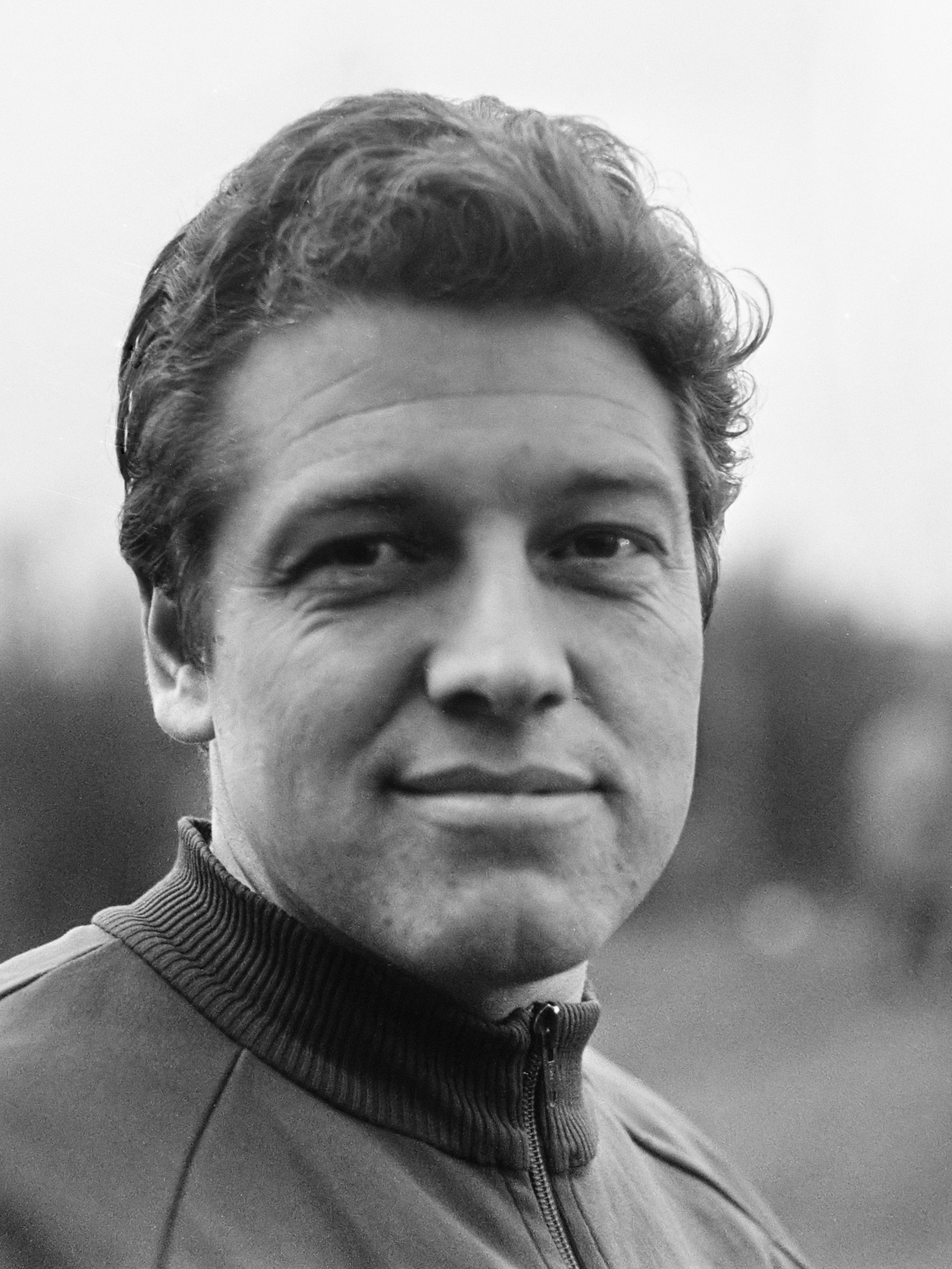

Personal information
- Full name: David White
- Date of birth: 23 August 1933
- Place of birth: Motherwell, Scotland
- Date of death: 17 July 2013 (aged 79)
- Place of death: Wishaw, Scotland
- Position: Wing half

Senior career*
Years	Team	Apps	(Gls)
–1957	Royal Albert		
1957–1966	Clyde	223	(42)

Managerial career
- 1966–1967: Clyde
- 1967–1969: Rangers
- 1972–1977: Dundee
- * Club domestic league appearances and goals

David White (23 August 1933 – 17 July 2013) was a Scottish football player and manager. He played as a wing half for Clyde for his whole career, before managing Clyde, Rangers and Dundee.

== Playing career ==
White was 23 years of age when he joined Clyde from the Junior side Royal Albert. While also working as an engineer, he played more than 300 games for Clyde and became club captain and acted as player-coach.

== Managerial career ==
He was promoted to Clyde manager after the Scottish Football Association appointed his predecessor John Prentice as the Scotland national team manager. After a year managing the Bully Wee (which ended in their highest-ever finish of 3rd place in 1966–67), he was appointed as assistant to Scot Symon at Rangers in summer 1967. When Symon left the club just five months later, White was promoted to manager on 1 November.

His reign was generally unsuccessful and he became the first Rangers manager not to win any major honours whilst in charge at the club. With the expectations of Rangers fans and boardroom high, coupled with the success of Celtic under Jock Stein, the pressure began to build on White. Although he signed Colin Stein and Alex MacDonald who went on to success with the club, a defeat in the European Cup Winners' Cup to Polish team Górnik Zabrze in late 1969 which followed a poor start to the 1969-70 season saw White be sacked.

He later went on to manage Dundee and guided them to a Scottish League Cup triumph in 1973-74. Somewhat ironically the victory in the cup final came against Celtic, the team who had caused him so many problems at Rangers. His success didn't last however, and Dundee were relegated at the end of the inaugural Scottish Premier Division season in 1976. White lasted one more year before retiring after failing to get the side promoted; he gave a first-team debut to future Scotland player and manager Gordon Strachan.

== Later years and death ==
After leaving football, White spent some time working in a supermarket and was also employed by Lanarkshire car sales boss Ian Skelly. He was also a keen golfer and his son Alan became a local club professional. He died in July 2013, aged 79, following a short illness.
