= Jocky Scott =

Scottish footballer (born 1948)

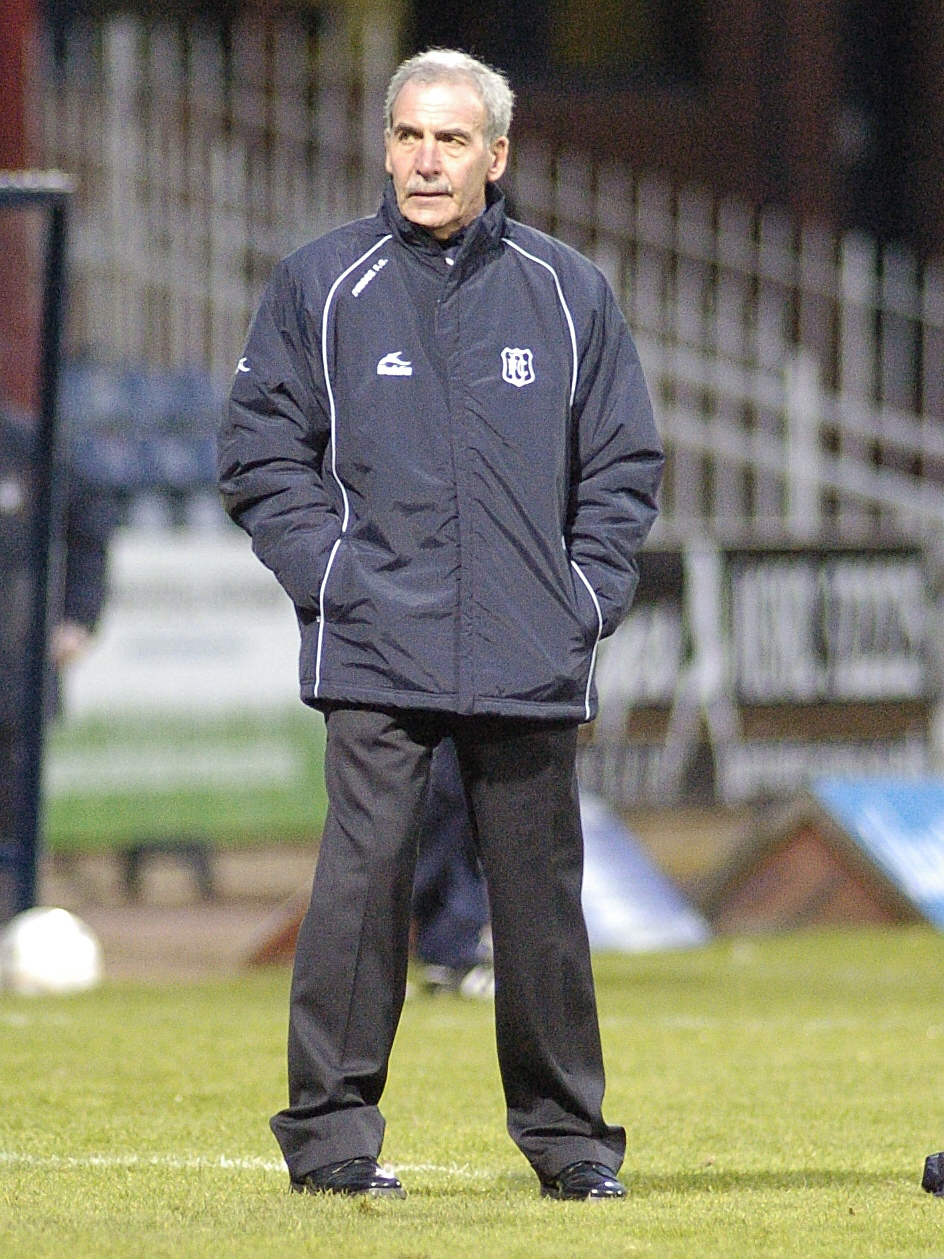
- Scott as Dundee manager, 2009

Personal information
- Full name: John Alexander Scott
- Date of birth: 14 January 1948 (age 78)
- Place of birth: Aberdeen, Scotland
- Position: Striker

Youth career
- Chelsea

Senior career*
Years	Team	Apps	(Gls)
1964–1975	Dundee	275	(113)
1975–1977	Aberdeen	52	(17)
1977–1978	Seattle Sounders	39	(9)
1978–1981	Dundee	27	(4)
Total		393	(143)

International career
1971	Scotland	2	(0)

Managerial career
- 1986–1988: Dundee
- 1988–1991: Aberdeen (co-manager)
- 1991–1993: Dunfermline Athletic
- 1994: Arbroath
- 1996: Hibernian (caretaker)
- 1998–2000: Dundee
- 2000–2001: Notts County
- 2002: Raith Rovers
- 2005: Plymouth Argyle (caretaker)
- 2008–2010: Dundee
- 2011: Stirling Albion
- * Club domestic league appearances and goals

John Alexander Scott (born 14 January 1948) is a Scottish football coach and former player.

During his playing career he played for Dundee, Aberdeen, Seattle Sounders and Scotland.

An extensive management career followed with spells at Aberdeen, Dundee (three separate spells), Arbroath, Dunfermline Athletic, Notts County, Raith Rovers and Stirling Albion. He also had coaching jobs at other various clubs in both Scotland and England.

== Club career ==
Scott played club football for Dundee and Aberdeen, winning the Scottish League Cup with both clubs. He memorably scored a hat-trick when Aberdeen beat Rangers 5–1 in the competition's semi-final in October 1976. He was capped twice for the Scotland national team in 1971. He was Soccer Bowl 1977 finalist with the Seattle Sounders (lost 1–2 to the New York Cosmos) in the North American Soccer League.

== Managerial career ==
After his playing career, Scott moved into management. He managed Aberdeen, Dundee (on three separate occasions), Arbroath, Dunfermline Athletic, Notts County, Raith Rovers and Stirling Albion.

He also had coaching roles at Sunderland, Plymouth Argyle and Hibernian. The latter two he also had spells as manager on a caretaker basis.

Aberdeen appointed Scott to their coaching team in September 2012.

== Personal life ==
His father Willie played for Aberdeen and Newcastle United in the 1930s.

== Managerial stats ==
As of 24 February 2013 (UTC)

Team	Nat	From	To	Record				
Team	Nat	From	To	G	W	D	L	Win %
Dundee	(Scotland)	August 1986	May 1988	108	45	25	38	41.67
Aberdeen	(Scotland)	August 1988	September 1991	151	83	40	28	54.97
Dunfermline	(Scotland)	23 September 1991	31 May 1993	90	28	19	43	31.11
Arbroath	(Scotland)	January 1994	April 1994	14	1	5	8	7.14
Dundee	(Scotland)	8 February 1998	28 June 2000	95	35	18	42	36.84
Notts County	(England)	28 June 2000	10 October 2001	71	28	19	24	39.44
Raith Rovers	(Scotland)	2 January 2002	1 May 2002	17	5	4	8	29.41
Dundee	(Scotland)	30 October 2008	20 March 2010	65	31	13	21	47.69
Stirling	(Scotland)	19 January 2011	5 December 2011	38	5	8	25	13.16
Total				649	261	151	237	40.22

- Caretaker spells not included.
- Jocky Scott co-managed with Alex Smith at Aberdeen.
- Statistics based on soccerbase information.

== Honours ==
=== Player ===
Dundee

- Scottish League Cup: 1973–74

Aberdeen

- Scottish League Cup: 1976–77

=== Manager ===
Aberdeen (as co-manager with Alex Smith)

- Scottish Cup: 1989–90
- Scottish League Cup: 1989–90
  - runners-up: 1988–89

Dunfermline Athletic

- Scottish League Cup:
  - runners-up: 1991–92

Dundee

- Scottish First Division: 1997–98
- Scottish Challenge Cup: 2009-10
- Tennents' Sixes: 1988
