= Davie Johnston (footballer, born 1948) =

Scottish footballer

Personal information
- Date of birth: 29 February 1948 (age 78)
- Place of birth: Aberdeen, Scotland
- Position: Left back

Youth career
- Banks O' Dee

Senior career*
Years	Team	Apps	(Gls)
1968–1978	Dundee	218	(9)
1979–1981	Montrose	21	(2)
- Banks O' Dee
Total		239	(11)
- * Club domestic league appearances and goals

Davie Johnston (born 29 February 1948) is a Scottish footballer, who played for Dundee and Montrose.
