= Iain Phillip =

Scottish footballer

Personal information
- Full name: Iain Frederick Phillip
- Date of birth: 14 February 1951 (age 75)
- Place of birth: Dundee, Scotland
- Position: Defender

Senior career*
Years	Team	Apps	(Gls)
1970–1972	Dundee	61	(0)
1972–1973	Crystal Palace	35	(1)
1974–1978	Dundee	129	(2)
1978–1983	Dundee United	88	(1)
1983–1986	Raith Rovers	70	(0)
1986–1988	Arbroath	51	(0)
Total		434	(4)

International career
1972	Scottish Football League XI	1	(0)
- * Club domestic league appearances and goals

Iain Frederick Phillip (born 14 February 1951 in Dundee) is a Scottish former footballer who played in defence. Phillip made over 400 league appearances during his eighteen-year playing career. He won the Scottish League Cup with each of the Dundee clubs and three times in total. He also played for Crystal Palace, Raith Rovers and Arbroath.

== Honours ==
Dundee:

- Scottish League Cup: 1973–74

Dundee United:

- Scottish League Cup: 1979–80, 1980–81
