= 1951–52 Dundee F.C. season =

Dundee
1951–52 season
- Manager: George Anderson
- Division A: 8th
- Scottish Cup: Finalists
- League Cup: Champions
- Top goalscorer: League: Bobby Flavell (13); All: Bobby Flavell (18)
Home colours

The 1951–52 season was the fiftieth season in which Dundee competed at a Scottish national level, playing in Division A, where the club would finish in 8th place.

Dundee would also compete in both the Scottish Cup and the Scottish League Cup. Dundee would find great success in the cups in this season, coming close to winning the double. After just barely qualifying out from the group stage, Dundee would make it to the League Cup Final where they would defeat Rangers by the score of 3–2, with captain Alf Boyd scoring a 90th-minute header from a Billy Steel free kick to secure the club's second major honour in its history, in front of a crowd of 92,325. Dundee would grace Hampden Park again for the Scottish Cup Final, but failed in their bid to win both cups in a comprehensive defeat to Motherwell. The attendance for this final (136,274) is a Scottish record for any game not involving either of the Old Firm.

== Scottish Division A ==
Statistics provided by Dee Archive.

Match day	Date	Opponent	H/A	Score	Dundee scorer(s)	Attendance
1	8 September	Stirling Albion	A	2–2	Copland	11,000
2	22 September	Aberdeen	A	1–3	Irvine	25,000
3	29 September	Rangers	H	1–0	Steel	31,000
4	6 October	Heart of Midlothian	A	2–4	Toner, Flavell	28,522
5	20 October	Celtic	H	2–1	Christie, Pattillo	32,000
6	3 November	Raith Rovers	H	2–0	Flavell (2)	21,000
7	10 November	Motherwell	A	1–2	Flavell	7,000
8	17 November	Queen of the South	H	0–0		15,000
9	24 November	St Mirren	A	1–1	Flavell	12,000
10	1 December	Hibernian	A	1–4	Ewen	26,000
11	8 December	East Fife	H	3–4	Pattillo, Flavell (2)	23,000
12	15 December	Airdrieonians	A	3–4	Burrell, Steel, Flavell	9,000
13	22 December	Stirling Albion	H	4–1	Cowan, Boyd, Flavell, A. Henderson	17,000
14	25 December	Partick Thistle	A	3–1	A. Henderson (2), Ziesing	17,000
15	29 December	Third Lanark	A	2–0	Flavell, Steel	8,000
16	1 January	Aberdeen	H	3–2	Pattillo, Hill, Flavell	26,000
17	2 January	Rangers	A	2–1	Steel, Christie	35,000
18	5 January	Heart of Midlothian	H	3–3	A. Henderson, Steel, Christie	32,000
19	12 January	Greenock Morton	A	0–3		12,000
20	19 January	Celtic	A	1–1	Steel	35,000
21	13 February	Raith Rovers	A	2–1	Toner, Ewen	4,200
22	16 February	Motherwell	H	1–2	Williams	21,009
23	27 February	Queen of the South	A	0–1		5,000
24	1 March	St Mirren	H	3–0	Burrell, A. Henderson, Ziesing	12,000
25	15 March	East Fife	A	1–3	A. Henderson	12,000
26	22 March	Airdrieonians	H	0–1		17,000
27	2 April	Greenock Morton	H	2–2	Ziesing, Hill	7,500
28	9 April	Hibernian	A	1–3	Christie	26,000
29	12 April	Partick Thistle	H	0–2		16,000
30	26 April	Third Lanark	H	6–0	Christie, Flavell (3), A. Henderson	10,500

=== League table ===
Pos	Team	Pld	W	D	L	GF	GA	GD	Pts
6	Partick Thistle	30	12	7	11	48	51	−3	31
7	Motherwell	30	12	7	11	51	57	−6	31
8	Dundee	30	11	6	13	53	52	+1	28
9	Celtic	30	10	8	12	52	55	−3	28
10	Queen of the South	30	10	8	12	50	60	−10	28

Source: RSSSF

== Scottish League Cup ==
Statistics provided by Dee Archive.

=== Group 3 ===
Match day	Date	Opponent	H/A	Score	Dundee scorer(s)	Attendance
1	11 August	St Mirren	A	2–2	Toner, Flavell	12,000
2	15 August	Heart of Midlothian	H	2–1	Ziesing (2)	22,500
3	18 August	Raith Rovers	H	5–0	Steel, Toner (3), Colville (o.g.)	21,000
4	25 August	St Mirren	H	0–1		21,000
5	29 August	Heart of Midlothian	A	2–5	Toner, Ziesing	32,488
6	1 September	Raith Rovers	A	3–1	Christie (2), Williams	12,400

==== Group 3 table ====
Team	Pld	W	D	L	GF	GA	GR	Pts
Dundee	6	3	1	2	14	10	1.400	7
Heart of Midlothian	6	3	1	2	15	12	1.250	7
St Mirren	6	2	2	2	13	13	1.000	6
Raith Rovers	6	2	0	4	6	13	0.462	4

=== Knockout stage ===
Match day	Date	Opponent	H/A	Score	Dundee scorer(s)	Attendance
Quarter-finals, 1st leg	15 September	Falkirk	A	0–0		12,000
Quarter-finals, 2nd leg	20 September	Falkirk	H	2–1	Ziesing, Steel	20,000
Dundee won 2–1 on aggregate
Semi-finals	13 October	Motherwell	N	5–1	Christie, Flavell (3), Pattillo	31,000
Final	27 October	Rangers	N	3–2	Flavell 47', Pattillo 69', Boyd 90'	92,325

== Scottish Cup ==
Statistics provided by Dee Archive.

Match day	Date	Opponent	H/A	Score	Dundee scorer(s)	Attendance
1st round	26 January	Ayr United	H	4–0	Irvine (2), Pattillo, Steel	20,000
2nd round	9 February	Wigtown & Bladnoch	A	7–1	Steel (2), Pattillo (2), Hill (2), Christie	4,000
3rd round	23 February	Berwick Rangers	H	1–0	Pattillo	15,000
Quarter-finals	8 March	Aberdeen	H	4–0	Ziesing, Steel (2), Boyd	41,000
Semi-finals	29 March	Third Lanark	N	2–0	Burrell, Steel	23,615
Final	19 April	Motherwell	N	0–4		136,274

== Player statistics ==
Statistics provided by Dee Archive

No.	Pos	Nat	Player	Total		Division A		Scottish Cup		League Cup	
No.	Pos	Nat	Player	Apps	Goals	Apps	Goals	Apps	Goals	Apps	Goals
	FW	(Scotland) SCO	Jimmy Andrews	4	0	0	0	0	0	4	0
	MF	(Scotland) SCO	Alfie Boyd	42	3	26	1	6	1	10	1
	GK	(Scotland) SCO	Bill Brown	21	0	16	0	0	0	5	0
	FW	(Northern Ireland) NIR	Gerry Burrell	14	3	12	2	2	1	0	0
	FW	(Scotland) SCO	George Christie	36	9	24	5	6	1	6	3
	FW	(Scotland) SCO	Ernie Copland	2	2	1	2	0	0	1	0
	DF	(Canada) CAN	Jack Cowan	32	1	23	1	6	0	3	0
	MF	(Scotland) SCO	Doug Cowie	38	0	23	0	6	0	9	0
	FW	(Scotland) SCO	Ernie Ewen	8	2	7	2	0	0	1	0
	FW	(Scotland) SCO	Bobby Flavell	32	19	21	14	3	0	8	5
	DF	(Scotland) SCO	Gerry Follon	40	0	24	0	6	0	10	0
	FW	(Scotland) SCO	Jimmy Fraser	1	0	1	0	0	0	0	0
	DF	(Scotland) SCO	Gordon Frew	16	0	9	0	0	0	7	0
	MF	(Scotland) SCO	Tommy Gallacher	35	0	22	0	6	0	7	0
	FW	(Scotland) SCO	Albert Henderson	11	8	11	8	0	0	0	0
	GK	(Scotland) SCO	Bobby Henderson	25	0	14	0	6	0	5	0
	MF	(Scotland) SCO	Robert Henderson	1	0	0	0	0	0	1	0
	FW	(Scotland) SCO	George Hill	17	4	12	2	4	2	1	0
	DF	(Scotland) SCO	Andy Irvine	12	3	7	1	2	2	3	0
	FW	(Scotland) SCO	George Merchant	11	0	11	0	0	0	0	0
	FW	(Scotland) SCO	Johnny Pattillo	23	9	15	3	6	4	2	2
	FW	(Scotland) SCO	Billy Steel	35	14	21	6	6	6	8	2
	FW	(Scotland) SCO	Jimmy Toner	20	7	11	2	0	0	9	5
	FW	(South Africa) RSA	Stan Williams	10	2	7	1	0	0	3	1
	MF	(South Africa) RSA	Ken Ziesing	20	8	12	3	1	1	7	4

== See also ==
- List of Dundee F.C. seasons
