= 1950–51 Dundee F.C. season =

Dundee
1950–51 season
- Manager: George Anderson
- Division A: 3rd
- Scottish Cup: Quarter-finals
- League Cup: Group Stage
- Top goalscorer: League: Billy Steel (7); All: Alfie Boyd (9)
Home colours

The 1950–51 season was the forty-ninth season in which Dundee competed at a Scottish national level, playing in Division A, where the club would finish in 3rd place. Dundee would also compete in both the Scottish Cup and the Scottish League Cup. They would fail to make it out of the group stages in the League Cup, but would make it to the Quarter-finals in the Scottish Cup.

== Scottish Division A ==
Statistics provided by Dee Archive.

Match day	Date	Opponent	H/A	Score	Dundee scorer(s)	Attendance
1	9 September	Heart of Midlothian	H	1–0	Gunn	25,000
2	16 September	Rangers	A	0–0		40,000
3	23 September	Aberdeen	H	2–0	Steel, Toner	34,000
4	30 September	Greenock Morton	A	3–2	Mitchell (o.g.), Steel, Boyd	15,000
5	7 October	Falkirk	H	2–0	Toner	24,000
6	14 October	Clyde	A	1–2	Gunn	25,000
7	21 October	Celtic	A	0–0		30,000
8	28 October	Partick Thistle	H	3–2	Steel, Boyd, Gerrie	25,000
9	4 November	Raith Rovers	A	1–0	Gerrie	19,000
10	11 November	Motherwell	H	0–0		30,000
11	18 November	Third Lanark	A	0–2		14,000
12	25 November	St Mirren	H	5–0	Christie (2), Pattillo (2), Boyd	20,000
13	2 December	Hibernian	A	0–2		31,000
14	9 December	East Fife	A	3–1	Williams, Hill, Pattillo	8,000
15	16 December	Airdrieonians	H	3–0	Steel (2), Boyd	13,000
16	23 December	Heart of Midlothian	A	1–1	Pattillo	22,147
17	30 December	Rangers	H	2–0	Gunn, Ewen	37,400
18	1 January	Aberdeen	A	0–1		30,000
19	2 January	Greenock Morton	H	2–1	Ziesing, Ewen	35,000
20	6 January	Falkirk	A	1–2	Ziesing	10,000
21	20 January	Celtic	H	3–1	Boyd (2), Ziesing	28,000
22	17 February	Motherwell	A	2–0	Copland, Shaw (o.g.)	10,000
23	24 February	Third Lanark	H	2–1	Ewen, Andrews	20,000
24	3 March	St Mirren	A	2–2	Ewen, Irvine	10,000
25	17 March	East Fife	H	2–4	Ewen, Williams	15,000
26	24 March	Airdrieonians	A	0–2		10,000
27	31 March	Clyde	H	1–1	Steel	9,000
28	2 April	Raith Rovers	A	2–0	Williams, Hill	15,000
29	7 April	Hibernian	H	2–2	Hill, Steel	21,000
30	28 April	Partick Thistle	A	1–1	Andrews	20,000

=== League table ===
Pos	Team	Pld	W	D	L	GF	GA	GD	Pts
1	Hibernian	30	22	4	4	78	26	+52	48
2	Rangers	30	17	4	9	64	37	+27	38
3	Dundee	30	15	8	7	47	30	+17	38
4	Heart of Midlothian	30	16	5	9	72	45	+27	37
5	Aberdeen	30	15	5	10	61	50	+11	35

Source: RSSSF

== Scottish League Cup ==
Statistics provided by Dee Archive.

=== Group 2 ===
Match day	Date	Opponent	H/A	Score	Dundee scorer(s)	Attendance
1	12 August	Hibernian	A	0–2		40,000
2	16 August	Falkirk	H	1–2	Follon	15,000
3	19 August	St Mirren	H	3–1	Gerrie, Rattray (2)	18,000
4	26 August	Hibernian	H	0–2		25,000
5	30 August	Falkirk	A	2–1	Rattray, Gerrie	9,000
6	2 September	St Mirren	A	1–3	Boyd	12,000

==== Group 2 table ====
Team	Pld	W	D	L	GF	GA	GR	Pts
Hibernian	6	6	0	0	24	4	6.000	12
St Mirren	6	2	1	3	7	16	0.438	5
Dundee	6	2	0	4	7	11	0.636	4
Falkirk	6	1	1	4	8	15	0.533	3

== Scottish Cup ==
Statistics provided by Dee Archive.

Match day	Date	Opponent	H/A	Score	Dundee scorer(s)	Attendance
1st round	27 January	Dundee United	H	2–2	Boyd, Ewen	38,000
1R replay	31 January	Dundee United	A	1–0	Steel	22,000
2nd round	10 February	St Johnstone	A	3–1	Boyd, Christie, Ewen	29,972
Quarter-finals	10 March	Raith Rovers	H	1–2	Christie	40,920

== Player statistics ==
Statistics provided by Dee Archive

No.	Pos	Nat	Player	Total		Division A		Scottish Cup		League Cup	
No.	Pos	Nat	Player	Apps	Goals	Apps	Goals	Apps	Goals	Apps	Goals
	FW	(Scotland) SCO	Jimmy Andrews	16	2	15	2	0	0	1	0
	FW	(Scotland) SCO	Alec Beaton	2	0	2	0	0	0	0	0
	MF	(Scotland) SCO	Alfie Boyd	37	9	28	6	4	2	5	1
	GK	(Scotland) SCO	Bill Brown	13	0	11	0	2	0	0	0
	FW	(Scotland) SCO	George Christie	16	4	13	2	3	2	0	0
	FW	(Scotland) SCO	Ernie Copland	7	1	5	1	1	0	1	0
	DF	(Canada) CAN	Jack Cowan	33	0	25	0	3	0	5	0
	MF	(Scotland) SCO	Doug Cowie	34	0	25	0	4	0	5	0
	MF	(Scotland) SCO	Willie Craig	4	0	4	0	0	0	0	0
	FW	(Scotland) SCO	Ernie Ewen	19	7	15	5	4	2	0	0
	DF	(Scotland) SCO	Gerry Follon	35	1	27	0	4	0	4	1
	FW	(Scotland) SCO	Jimmy Fraser	2	0	0	0	0	0	2	0
	DF	(Scotland) SCO	Gordon Frew	4	0	2	0	2	0	0	0
	MF	(Scotland) SCO	Tommy Gallacher	19	0	13	0	1	0	5	0
	FW	(Scotland) SCO	Syd Gerrie	10	4	5	2	0	0	5	2
	FW	(Scotland) SCO	Alistair Gunn	13	3	13	3	0	0	0	0
	FW	(Scotland) SCO	George Hill	22	3	15	3	3	0	4	0
	DF	(Scotland) SCO	Andy Irvine	22	1	18	1	4	0	0	0
	GK	(Scotland) SCO	Johnny Lynch	21	0	19	0	2	0	0	0
	DF	(Scotland) SCO	Alan Massie	3	0	2	0	0	0	1	0
	FW	(Scotland) SCO	Johnny McIlhatton	4	0	0	0	0	0	4	0
	FW	(Scotland) SCO	Johnny Pattillo	17	4	13	4	1	0	3	0
	FW	(Scotland) SCO	Peter Rattray	2	3	0	0	0	0	2	3
	GK	(Scotland) SCO	Gordon Rennie	5	0	0	0	0	0	5	0
	MF	(Scotland) SCO	Willie Roy	2	0	2	0	0	0	0	0
	FW	(Scotland) SCO	Billy Steel	30	8	26	7	4	1	0	0
	FW	(Scotland) SCO	George Stewart	2	0	0	0	0	0	2	0
	FW	(Scotland) SCO	Jimmy Toner	8	3	8	3	0	0	0	0
	FW	(South Africa) RSA	Stan Williams	22	3	21	3	0	0	1	0
	MF	(South Africa) RSA	Ken Ziesing	5	3	3	3	2	0	0	0

== See also ==
- List of Dundee F.C. seasons
