= 1949–50 Dundee F.C. season =

Dundee
1949–50 season
- Manager: George Anderson
- Division A: 6th
- Scottish Cup: 1st round
- League Cup: Group Stage
- Top goalscorer: League: Syd Gerrie (13); All: Syd Gerrie (15)
Home colours

The 1949–50 season was the forty-eighth season in which Dundee competed at a Scottish national level, playing in Division A, where the club would finish in 6th place. Dundee would also compete in both the Scottish Cup and the Scottish League Cup, but would struggle in both competitions, finishing bottom of their group in the League Cup and being knocked out in a 1st round replay against Heart of Midlothian in the Scottish Cup.

== Scottish Division A ==
Statistics provided by Dee Archive.

Match day	Date	Opponent	H/A	Score	Dundee scorer(s)	Attendance
1	10 September	Stirling Albion	A	2–2	Fraser, Andrews	15,000
2	17 September	Queen of the South	H	3–0	Boyd, Fraser (2)	19,000
3	24 September	Aberdeen	A	2–2	Fraser, Rattray	23,000
4	1 October	Motherwell	H	3–1	Fraser (2), Boyd	18,000
5	15 October	Clyde	H	2–3	Gunn, Boyd	19,000
6	22 October	Celtic	H	3–0	Rattray, Gerrie, Gunn	35,000
7	29 October	Partick Thistle	A	3–2	Rattray (2), Andrews	20,000
8	5 November	Raith Rovers	H	2–1	Gerrie (2)	20,000
9	12 November	Queen of the South	A	1–1	Gunn	6,000
10	19 November	Falkirk	H	2–0	Boyd, Gerrie	13,000
11	26 November	St Mirren	A	1–1	Gunn	35,000
12	3 December	Hibernian	H	1–2	Rattray	28,000
13	10 December	East Fife	H	1–0	Gerrie	22,000
14	17 December	Third Lanark	A	0–1		5,000
15	24 December	Stirling Albion	H	4–1	Toner (2), Stewart, Gerrie	13,000
16	31 December	Rangers	A	2–2	Toner, Stewart	35,000
17	2 January	Aberdeen	H	1–1	Gerrie	32,000
18	3 January	Motherwell	A	2–0	Gerrie, Hill	20,000
19	7 January	Heart of Midlothian	H	3–1	Gerrie (2), Gunn	33,500
20	14 January	Clyde	A	0–1		11,000
21	21 January	Celtic	A	0–2		25,000
22	4 February	Partick Thistle	H	1–0	Cowie	21,000
23	25 February	Falkirk	A	2–2	Fraser (2)	10,000
24	4 March	St Mirren	H	2–0	Fraser (2)	13,000
25	11 March	Hibernian	A	2–4	Gerrie (2)	33,000
26	18 March	East Fife	A	0–1		7,000
27	25 March	Third Lanark	H	1–4	Ewen	11,000
28	8 April	Raith Rovers	A	1–4	Boyd	10,000
29	17 April	Rangers	H	0–1		32,000
30	22 April	Heart of Midlothian	A	2–6	Gerrie, Hill	19,447

=== League table ===
Pos	Team	Pld	W	D	L	GF	GA	GD	Pts
4	East Fife	30	15	7	8	58	43	+15	37
5	Celtic	30	14	7	9	51	50	+1	35
6	Dundee	30	12	7	11	49	46	+3	31
7	Partick Thistle	30	13	3	14	55	45	+10	29
8	Aberdeen	30	11	4	15	48	56	−8	26

Source: RSSSF

== Scottish League Cup ==
Statistics provided by Dee Archive.

=== Group 2 ===
Match day	Date	Opponent	H/A	Score	Dundee scorer(s)	Attendance
1	13 August	Clyde	H	1–1	Ewen	28,500
2	17 August	Motherwell	A	0–2		18,000
3	20 August	Partick Thistle	H	5–2	Hill, Stott (3), Gerrie	25,000
4	27 August	Clyde	A	0–2		16,000
5	31 August	Motherwell	H	0–1		20,000
6	3 September	Partick Thistle	A	2–4	Ewen, Fraser	40,000

==== Group 3 table ====
Team	Pld	W	D	L	GF	GA	GR	Pts
Partick Thistle	6	4	1	1	14	10	1.400	9
Motherwell	6	2	3	1	7	6	1.167	7
Clyde	6	1	3	2	8	9	0.889	5
Dundee	6	1	1	4	8	12	0.667	3

== Scottish Cup ==
Statistics provided by Dee Archive.

Match day	Date	Opponent	H/A	Score	Dundee scorer(s)	Attendance
1st round	28 January	Heart of Midlothian	A	1–1	Gerrie	39,568
1R replay	6 February	Heart of Midlothian	H	1–2 (AET)	Toner	29,000

== Player statistics ==
Statistics provided by Dee Archive

No.	Pos	Nat	Player	Total		Division A		Scottish Cup		League Cup	
No.	Pos	Nat	Player	Apps	Goals	Apps	Goals	Apps	Goals	Apps	Goals
	DF	(Scotland) SCO	Bobby Ancell	6	0	6	0	0	0	0	0
	FW	(Scotland) SCO	Jimmy Andrews	17	2	15	2	2	0	0	0
	DF	(Scotland) SCO	Jimmy Archibald	3	0	3	0	0	0	0	0
	FW	(Scotland) SCO	Alec Beaton	2	0	2	0	0	0	0	0
	MF	(Scotland) SCO	Alfie Boyd	37	5	29	5	2	0	6	0
	GK	(Scotland) SCO	Bill Brown	10	0	10	0	0	0	0	0
	DF	(Canada) CAN	Jack Cowan	23	0	21	0	2	0	0	0
	MF	(Scotland) SCO	Doug Cowie	29	1	22	1	1	0	6	0
	FW	(Scotland) SCO	Ernie Ewen	13	3	8	1	2	0	3	2
	DF	(Scotland) SCO	Gerry Follon	32	0	24	0	2	0	6	0
	FW	(Scotland) SCO	Jimmy Fraser	23	11	21	10	0	0	2	1
	MF	(Scotland) SCO	Tommy Gallacher	23	0	16	0	1	0	6	0
	FW	(Scotland) SCO	Syd Gerrie	31	15	25	13	2	1	4	1
	FW	(Scotland) SCO	Alistair Gunn	34	5	27	5	2	0	5	0
	FW	(Scotland) SCO	George Hill	22	3	17	2	0	0	5	1
	DF	(Scotland) SCO	Andy Irvine	5	0	3	0	0	0	2	0
	GK	(Scotland) SCO	Johnny Lynch	26	0	20	0	2	0	4	0
	DF	(Scotland) SCO	Alan Massie	8	0	6	0	0	0	2	0
	FW	(Scotland) SCO	Johnny McIlhatton	7	0	5	0	0	0	2	0
	FW	(Scotland) SCO	Johnny Pattillo	28	0	21	0	2	0	5	0
	FW	(Scotland) SCO	Peter Rattray	17	5	15	5	0	0	2	0
	GK	(Scotland) SCO	Jimmy Steadward	2	0	0	0	0	0	2	0
	FW	(Scotland) SCO	George Stewart	4	2	4	2	0	0	0	0
	FW	(Scotland) SCO	Alex Stott	4	3	0	0	0	0	4	3
	FW	(Scotland) SCO	Jimmy Toner	12	4	10	3	2	1	0	0

== See also ==
- List of Dundee F.C. seasons
