= 1947–48 Dundee F.C. season =

Dundee
1947–48 season
- Manager: George Anderson
- Division A: 4th
- Scottish Cup: 1st round
- League Cup: Group Stage
- Top goalscorer: League: Albert Juliussen (17); All: Albert Juliussen (19)
Home colours

The 1947–48 season was the forty-sixth season in which Dundee competed at a Scottish national level, and the first season back in the top tier since 1937–38, after winning the Scottish Division B the season prior. In their first season back in the top division, Dundee would have an impressive season and finish 4th, their highest finish in Scottish football since 1921–22.

Dundee would also compete in both the Scottish Cup and the Scottish League Cup. They would have less success in the cups than the league, as they failed to get out of their group in the League Cup, and were knocked out of the Scottish Cup in the 1st round by Heart of Midlothian.

== Scottish Division A ==
Statistics provided by Dee Archive.

Match day	Date	Opponent	H/A	Score	Dundee scorer(s)	Attendance
1	13 August	Greenock Morton	A	0–3		12,000
2	27 August	Queen of the South	H	1–0	Ewen	20,000
3	20 September	Aberdeen	A	2–3	Juliussen (2)	20,000
4	27 September	Airdrieonians	H	6–0	Juliussen (3), Pattillo, Turnbull, Ewen	19,000
5	4 October	Clyde	A	4–1	Turnbull (3), Pattillo	15,000
6	6 October	Heart of Midlothian	H	2–1	Pattillo, Ewen	26,000
7	18 October	Airdrieonians	A	0–2		8,000
8	25 October	Queen's Park	H	2–1	Pattillo, Turnbull	18,000
9	8 November	St Mirren	H	6–1	Hill, Juliussen (2), Pattillo, Smith, Turnbull	19,000
10	15 November	Hibernian	A	1–2	Turnbull	35,000
11	22 November	Motherwell	A	2–0	Turnbull (2)	10,000
12	29 November	Third Lanark	H	5–2	Hill, Ewen (2), Juliussen (2)	18,000
13	6 December	Celtic	A	1–1	Juliussen	25,000
14	13 December	Partick Thistle	H	2–2	Juliussen (2)	22,000
15	20 December	Greenock Morton	H	0–4		19,000
16	25 December	Rangers	H	1–3	Ewen	25,000
17	27 December	Queen of the South	A	2–5	Pattillo, Ewen	8,000
18	1 January	Aberdeen	H	0–0		14,500
19	3 January	Rangers	A	1–2	Juliussen	35,000
20	10 January	Clyde	H	7–0	Pattillo (2), Rattray, Smith, Gunn, Juliussen (2)	20,000
21	17 January	Heart of Midlothian	A	1–0	Johnsen	25,607
22	14 February	Queen's Park	A	1–0	Rattray	15,000
23	21 February	Falkirk	H	4–0	Pattillo (2), Rattray, Juliussen	12,000
24	28 February	St Mirren	A	1–4	Pattillo	12,000
25	6 March	Falkirk	A	2–3	Ewen, Juliussen	11,000
26	13 March	Motherwell	H	2–0	Paton (o.g.), Boyd	21,000
27	20 March	Third Lanark	A	4–1	Gunn, Pattillo, Ewen (2)	6,000
28	3 April	Partick Thistle	A	2–6	Gunn, Ewen	15,000
29	17 April	Celtic	H	2–3	Ewen, Mackay	31,000
30	1 May	Hibernian	H	3–1	Mackay, Ewen, Pattillo	30,000

=== League table ===
Pos	Team	Pld	W	D	L	GF	GA	GD	Pts
2	Rangers	30	21	4	5	92	20	+72	46
3	Partick Thistle	30	16	4	10	61	42	+19	36
4	Dundee	30	15	3	12	67	51	+16	33
5	St Mirren	30	13	5	12	54	58	−4	31
6	Clyde	30	12	7	11	52	57	−5	31

Source: SPFL

== Scottish League Cup ==
Statistics provided by Dee Archive.

=== Group 3 ===
Match day	Date	Opponent	H/A	Score	Dundee scorer(s)	Attendance
1	9 August	Third Lanark	H	5–0	Ewen (3), Turnbull (2)	24,313
2	16 August	Celtic	A	1–1	Turnbull	35,000
3	23 August	Rangers	A	0–3		25,000
4	30 August	Third Lanark	A	1–5	Stott	15,000
5	6 September	Celtic	H	4–1	Pattillo, Ewen (2), Juliussen	35,000
6	13 September	Rangers	H	1–1	Gallacher	39,000

==== Group 3 table ====
Team	Pld	W	D	L	GF	GA	GR	Pts
Rangers	6	4	1	1	12	4	3.000	9
Dundee	6	2	2	2	12	11	1.091	6
Celtic	6	2	1	3	9	11	0.818	5
Third Lanark	6	2	0	4	10	17	0.588	4

== Scottish Cup ==
Statistics provided by Dee Archive.

Match day	Date	Opponent	H/A	Score	Dundee scorer(s)	Attendance
1st round	24 January	Heart of Midlothian	H	2–4	Juliussen, Pattillo	31,500

== Player statistics ==
Statistics provided by Dee Archive

No.	Pos	Nat	Player	Total		Division A		Scottish Cup		League Cup	
No.	Pos	Nat	Player	Apps	Goals	Apps	Goals	Apps	Goals	Apps	Goals
	DF	(Scotland) SCO	Bobby Ancell	33	0	27	0	0	0	6	0
	FW	(Scotland) SCO	Jimmy Andrews	4	0	0	0	0	0	4	0
	GK	(Scotland) SCO	Reuben Bennett	0	0	0	0	0	0	0	0
	DF	(Scotland) SCO	Bob Bowman	1	0	0	0	0	0	1	0
	MF	(Scotland) SCO	Alfie Boyd	37	1	30	1	1	0	6	0
	GK	(Scotland) SCO	Jock Brown	11	0	10	0	1	0	0	0
	DF	(Scotland) SCO	Jack Bruce	4	0	4	0	0	0	0	0
	MF	(Scotland) SCO	Doug Cowie	18	0	15	0	0	0	3	0
	FW	(Scotland) SCO	Ernie Ewen	30	18	24	13	0	0	6	5
	DF	(Scotland) SCO	Gerry Follon	35	0	28	0	1	0	6	0
	MF	(Scotland) SCO	Tommy Gallacher	21	1	19	0	1	0	1	1
	MF	(Scotland) SCO	Tommy Gray	16	0	11	0	0	0	5	0
	FW	(Scotland) SCO	Alistair Gunn	20	3	16	3	1	0	3	0
	FW	(Scotland) SCO	George Hill	29	2	24	2	1	0	4	0
	DF	(Scotland) SCO	Andy Irvine	7	0	6	0	1	0	0	0
	FW	(Scotland) SCO	Jack Johnsen	1	1	1	1	0	0	0	0
	FW	(England) ENG	Albert Juliussen	24	19	20	17	1	1	3	1
	GK	(Scotland) SCO	Johnny Lynch	25	0	19	0	0	0	6	0
	FW	(Scotland) SCO	George Mackay	6	2	6	2	0	0	0	0
	MF	(Scotland) SCO	Gibby McKenzie	2	0	1	0	0	0	1	0
	FW	(Scotland) SCO	Johnny Pattillo	32	15	26	13	1	1	5	1
	FW	(Scotland) SCO	Peter Rattray	8	3	7	3	1	0	0	0
	FW	(England) ENG	Reg Smith	23	2	19	2	1	0	3	0
	GK	(Scotland) SCO	Jimmy Steadward	1	0	1	0	0	0	0	0
	FW	(Scotland) SCO	George Stewart	5	0	5	0	0	0	0	0
	FW	(Scotland) SCO	Alex Stott	1	1	0	0	0	0	1	1
	FW	(England) ENG	Ronnie Turnbull	17	12	11	9	0	0	6	3

== See also ==
- List of Dundee F.C. seasons
