= 1948–49 Dundee F.C. season =

Dundee
1948–49 season
- Manager: George Anderson
- Division A: 2nd
- Scottish Cup: Semi-finals
- League Cup: Semi-finals
- Top goalscorer: League: Alex Stott (30); All: Alex Stott (39)
Home colours

The 1948–49 season was the forty-seventh season in which Dundee competed at a Scottish national level, playing in Division A. In one of the club's most impressive seasons in its history, Dundee would lead the league going into the final day, but a loss to Falkirk and title rivals Rangers defeating Albion Rovers resulted in Dundee finishing 2nd, just 1 point behind Rangers. Striker Alex Stott would top the Division A scoring charts with 30 league goals, and would score 39 goals in all competitions.

Dundee would also compete in both the Scottish Cup and the Scottish League Cup. Continuing their impressive season, Dundee would reach the semi-finals of both competitions, but would fall to Rangers in the League Cup and to Clyde in a replay in the Scottish Cup.

== Scottish Division A ==
Statistics provided by Dee Archive.

Match day	Date	Opponent	H/A	Score	Dundee scorer(s)	Attendance
1	14 August	Heart of Midlothian	H	2–1	Stewart, Gunn	30,000
2	18 August	Clyde	A	3–3	Ewen, Gunn, Stewart	20,000
3	21 August	Aberdeen	H	3–0	Stott, Gunn, Ewen	30,000
4	28 August	Rangers	A	1–1	Stott	55,000
5	1 September	East Fife	H	2–5	Stott, Gunn	29,500
6	23 October	Celtic	A	1–0	Gerrie	25,000
7	6 November	Albion Rovers	A	6–0	Gunn, Stott (4), Mackay	8,000
8	13 November	Queen of the South	H	2–1	Pattillo, Stott	18,000
9	27 November	St Mirren	H	1–0	Boyd	18,000
10	4 December	Hibernian	A	1–2	Malloch	32,000
11	11 December	Motherwell	A	2–0	Hill, Gunn	12,000
12	18 December	Third Lanark	H	1–1	Hill	16,500
13	25 December	Clyde	H	3–1	Stott (2), Ewen	19,000
14	1 January	Aberdeen	A	3–1	Pattillo, Stott, Follon	26,000
15	3 January	Rangers	H	3–1	Ewen, Stott (2)	39,975
16	8 January	Heart of Midlothian	A	1–0	Stott	39,389
17	15 January	Greenock Morton	H	3–1	Stott (3)	16,000
18	29 January	East Fife	A	0–3		15,000
19	12 February	Partick Thistle	A	4–4	Gunn (2), Pattillo, Boyd	37,000
20	19 February	Albion Rovers	H	5–0	Pattillo (2), Andrews, Stott (2)	17,000
21	26 February	Queen of the South	A	1–0	Gunn	11,500
22	12 March	St Mirren	A	1–6	Gerrie	14,000
23	19 March	Hibernian	H	4–3	Pattillo, Stott, Bruce, Hill	32,500
24	2 April	Third Lanark	A	3–2	Stott (2), Pattillo	6,000
25	11 April	Celtic	H	3–2	Stott, Gerrie (2)	29,000
26	16 April	Greenock Morton	A	2–2	Ewen, Stott	15,000
27	20 April	Falkirk	H	3–1	Gunn, Stott (2)	21,500
28	23 April	Partick Thistle	H	4–2	Stott (2), Gerrie, Pattillo	25,000
29	27 April	Motherwell	H	2–1	Pattillo, Stott	26,000
30	30 April	Falkirk	A	1–4	Stott	18,000

=== League table ===
Pos	Team	Pld	W	D	L	GF	GA	GD	Pts
1	Rangers	30	20	6	4	63	32	+31	46
2	Dundee	30	20	5	5	71	48	+23	45
3	Hibernian	30	17	5	8	75	52	+23	39
4	East Fife	30	16	3	11	64	46	+18	35
5	Falkirk	30	12	8	10	70	54	+16	32

Source: RSSSF

== Scottish League Cup ==
Statistics provided by Dee Archive.

=== Group 2 ===
Match day	Date	Opponent	H/A	Score	Dundee scorer(s)	Attendance
1	11 September	Albion Rovers	H	2–1	Pattillo (2)	20,000
2	18 September	Falkirk	A	3–2	Gunn, Rattray, Stott	10,000
3	25 September	Motherwell	A	1–0	Stott	9,000
4	2 October	Albion Rovers	A	3–2	Gerrie, Hill, Pattillo	10,000
5	9 October	Falkirk	H	4–2	Boyd, Rattray, Fiddes (o.g.), Pattillo	16,000
6	16 October	Motherwell	H	0–1		23,000

==== Group 2 table ====
Team	Pld	W	D	L	GF	GA	GR	Pts
Dundee	6	5	0	1	13	8	1.625	10
Motherwell	6	4	0	2	11	5	2.200	8
Falkirk	6	2	0	4	8	11	0.727	4
Albion Rovers	6	1	0	5	9	17	0.529	2

=== Knockout stage ===
Match day	Date	Opponent	H/A	Score	Dundee scorer(s)	Attendance
Quarter-finals	30 October	Alloa Athletic	H	1–1 (AET)	Gunn	13,000
QF replay	3 November	Alloa Athletic	A	3–1	Stott, Boyd, Pattillo	9,500
Semi-finals	25 September	Rangers	N	1–4	Smith	50,996

== Scottish Cup ==
Statistics provided by Dee Archive.

Match day	Date	Opponent	H/A	Score	Dundee scorer(s)	Attendance
1st round	22 January	St Johnstone	H	6–1	Stott (4), Pattillo (2)	14,000
2nd round	5 February	St Mirren	H	0–0		34,000
2R replay	8 February	St Mirren	A	2–1	Gunn, Stott	28,000
Quarter-finals	5 March	Heart of Midlothian	A	4–2	Gunn, Hill, Gerrie, Pattillo	37,356
Semi-finals	26 March	Clyde	N	2–2	Gunn, Stott	33,000
SF replay	4 April	Clyde	N	1–2	Milligan (o.g.)	50,000

== Player statistics ==
Statistics provided by Dee Archive

No.	Pos	Nat	Player	Total		Division A		Scottish Cup		League Cup	
No.	Pos	Nat	Player	Apps	Goals	Apps	Goals	Apps	Goals	Apps	Goals
	DF	(Scotland) SCO	Bobby Ancell	19	0	10	0	0	0	9	0
	FW	(Scotland) SCO	Jimmy Andrews	15	1	10	1	2	0	3	0
	GK	(Scotland) SCO	Reuben Bennett	4	0	3	0	1	0	0	0
	DF	(Scotland) SCO	Bob Bowman	1	0	0	0	0	0	1	0
	MF	(Scotland) SCO	Alfie Boyd	43	4	29	2	5	0	9	2
	GK	(Scotland) SCO	Jock Brown	11	0	4	0	0	0	7	0
	DF	(Scotland) SCO	Jack Bruce	3	1	2	1	1	0	0	0
	FW	(Wales) WAL	Jack Court	3	0	2	0	1	0	0	0
	MF	(Scotland) SCO	Doug Cowie	30	0	23	0	6	0	1	0
	FW	(Scotland) SCO	Ernie Ewen	18	5	15	5	2	0	1	0
	DF	(Scotland) SCO	Gerry Follon	42	1	28	1	5	0	9	0
	MF	(Scotland) SCO	Tommy Gallacher	44	1	29	0	6	0	9	1
	FW	(Scotland) SCO	Syd Gerrie	18	7	11	5	3	1	4	1
	MF	(Scotland) SCO	Tommy Gray	21	0	11	0	1	0	9	0
	FW	(Scotland) SCO	Alistair Gunn	42	15	28	10	5	3	9	2
	FW	(Scotland) SCO	George Hill	28	5	18	3	5	1	5	1
	DF	(Scotland) SCO	Andy Irvine	21	0	16	0	5	0	0	0
	GK	(Scotland) SCO	Johnny Lynch	30	0	23	0	5	0	2	0
	FW	(Scotland) SCO	George Mackay	4	1	3	1	0	0	1	0
	FW	(Scotland) SCO	Jimmy Malloch	4	1	4	1	0	0	0	0
	FW	(Scotland) SCO	Johnny Pattillo	40	17	25	9	6	3	9	5
	FW	(Scotland) SCO	Peter Rattray	8	2	3	0	0	0	5	2
	FW	(England) ENG	Reg Smith	12	1	8	0	1	0	3	1
	FW	(Scotland) SCO	George Stewart	2	2	2	2	0	0	0	0
	FW	(Scotland) SCO	Alex Stott	33	39	23	30	6	6	4	3

== See also ==
- List of Dundee F.C. seasons
