= 1946–47 Dundee F.C. season =

Dundee
1946–47 season
- Manager: George Anderson
- Division B: 1st, Champions
- Scottish Cup: Quarter-finals
- League Cup: Quarter-finals
- Top goalscorer: League: Albert Juliussen (30); All: Albert Juliussen & Ernie Ewen (33)
Home colours

The 1946–47 season was the forty-fifth season in which Dundee competed at a Scottish national level, and the second season playing in the second tier, as well as the first season back in the Scottish Football League following the end of World War II. Dundee would sport an impressively high-scoring team who would win the league and record several records, including logging 10–0 victories in consecutive games, with striker Albert Juliussen breaking records for most goals scored by a Dundee player in a single match (7) and most scored in two consecutive matches (13). Dundee would also compete in the Scottish Cup in its first edition since its suspension after the outbreak of war, and despite an impressive 1st round victory over Celtic, they would be knocked out in the Quarter-finals by Aberdeen.

Dundee would also compete in the inaugural staging of the Scottish League Cup, which had been inspired by the previous season's Southern League Cup. Just as in the Scottish Cup, they would be knocked out by Aberdeen in the Quarter-finals.

== Scottish Division B ==
Statistics provided by Dee Archive.

| Match day | Date | Opponent | H/A | Score | Dundee scorer(s) | Attendance |
|---|---|---|---|---|---|---|
| 1 | 10 August | East Fife | A | 6–2 | Joyner (3), Juliussen (2), Pattillo | 10,000 |
| 2 | 17 August | Airdrieonians | H | 1–1 | Pattillo | 21,074 |
| 3 | 24 August | Dundee United | A | 2–1 | Juliussen, Turnbull | 21,000 |
| 4 | 31 August | Arbroath | H | 5–0 | Pattillo, Rattray (2), Ewen, Juliussen | 14,500 |
| 5 | 7 September | Dumbarton | A | 1–2 | Juliussen | 4,000 |
| 6 | 14 September | Alloa Athletic | A | 6–2 | Juliussen (4), Pattillo, Ewen | 14,000 |
| 7 | 2 November | Raith Rovers | A | 4–1 | Juliussen (2), Gunn, Pattillo | 8,000 |
| 8 | 9 November | Stenhousemuir | H | 4–1 | Ewen (3), Juliussen | 11,000 |
| 9 | 16 November | Cowdenbeath | A | 8–2 | Turnbull (3), Ewen (3), Pattillo (2) | 6,500 |
| 10 | 23 November | Dunfermline Athletic | A | 5–2 | Hill, Ewen (3), Turnbull | 6,000 |
| 11 | 30 November | Albion Rovers | H | 6–2 | Turnbull (4), McKenzie, Gunn | 16,000 |
| 12 | 7 December | St Johnstone | A | 5–1 | Pattillo (2), Ewen (2), Turnbull | 10,000 |
| 13 | 14 December | Ayr United | A | 6–2 | Hill, Turnbull (2), Gunn, McKenzie, Pattillo | 5,500 |
| 14 | 21 December | East Fife | H | 2–0 | Pattillo, Hill | 17,500 |
| 15 | 28 December | Airdrieonians | A | 1–2 | Smith | 15,000 |
| 16 | 1 January | Dundee United | H | 2–0 | Turnbull, Ewen | 24,000 |
| 17 | 2 January | Arbroath | A | 4–1 | Ewen (2), Hill, Turnbull | 10,000 |
| 18 | 4 January | Cowdenbeath | H | 6–2 | Turnbull (3), Juliussen, Ewen (2) | 12,000 |
| 19 | 11 January | Stenhousemuir | A | 0–0 | | 2,500 |
| 20 | 18 January | St Johnstone | H | 2–0 | Gunn, Turnbull | 16,800 |
| 21 | 1 February | Albion Rovers | A | 2–2 | Joyner, Pattillo | 4,000 |
| 22 | 8 March | Alloa Athletic | A | 10–0 | Gunn, Juliussen (6), Rattray, Smith, Ewen | 3,700 |
| 23 | 22 March | Dunfermline Athletic | H | 10–0 | Rattray, Juliussen (7), Ewen (2) | 14,000 |
| 24 | 5 April | Dumbarton | H | 4–0 | Smith, Rattray (3) | 5,873 |
| 25 | 23 April | Raith Rovers | H | 5–2 | Ewen, Pattillo, Juliussen (3) | 10,000 |
| 26 | 3 May | Ayr United | H | 6–2 | Gunn, Ewen (2), Juliussen, Smith, Pattillo | 4,000 |

=== League table ===
| Pos | Team | Pld | W | D | L | GF | GA | GD | Pts | Promotion or relegation |
|---|---|---|---|---|---|---|---|---|---|---|
| 1 | Dundee | 26 | 21 | 3 | 2 | 113 | 30 | +83 | 45 | Promotion to the 1947–48 Division A |
| 2 | Airdrieonians | 26 | 19 | 4 | 3 | 78 | 38 | +40 | 42 | Promotion to the 1947–48 Division A |
| 3 | East Fife | 26 | 12 | 7 | 7 | 58 | 39 | +19 | 31 | |
| 4 | Albion Rovers | 26 | 10 | 7 | 9 | 50 | 54 | −4 | 27 | |
| 5 | Alloa Athletic | 26 | 11 | 5 | 10 | 51 | 57 | −6 | 27 | |

== Scottish League Cup ==
Statistics provided by Dee Archive.

=== Group Section 6 ===
| Match day | Date | Opponent | H/A | Score | Dundee scorer(s) | Attendance |
|---|---|---|---|---|---|---|
| 1 | 21 September | Raith Rovers | A | 2–0 | Pattillo | 6,000 |
| 2 | 28 September | Stenhousemuir | H | 4–0 | Juliussen, Ewen (3) | 13,000 |
| 3 | 12 October | Raith Rovers | H | 3–1 | Ewen, Pattillo (2) | 15,000 |
| 4 | 19 October | Stenhousemuir | A | 4–0 | Ewen (2), Pattillo (2) | 1,000 |

==== Section 6 table ====
| Team | Pld | W | D | L | GF | GA | GR | Pts |
|---|---|---|---|---|---|---|---|---|
| Dundee (2) | 4 | 4 | 0 | 0 | 13 | 0 | — | 8 |
| Stenhousemuir (2) | 4 | 1 | 0 | 3 | 5 | 12 | 0.417 | 2 |
| Raith Rovers (2) | 4 | 1 | 0 | 3 | 4 | 10 | 0.400 | 2 |

=== Knockout stage ===
| Match day | Date | Opponent | H/A | Score | Dundee scorer(s) | Attendance |
|---|---|---|---|---|---|---|
| Quarter-finals, 1st leg | 1 March | Aberdeen | H | 0–1 | | 28,300 |
| Quarter-finals, 2nd leg | 28 September | Aberdeen | A | 2–3 | Juliussen (2) | 18,000 |
Aberdeen won 4–2 on aggregate

== Scottish Cup ==
Statistics provided by Dee Archive.

Dundee received a bye past the 2nd round and directly into the 3rd round.

| Match day | Date | Opponent | H/A | Score | Dundee scorer(s) | Attendance |
|---|---|---|---|---|---|---|
| 1st round | 25 January | Celtic | H | 2–1 | Ewen, Turnbull | 36,000 |
| 3rd round | 22 February | Albion Rovers | H | 3–0 | Ewen, Pattillo (2) | 20,269 |
| Quarter-finals | 29 March | Aberdeen | H | 1–2 (AET) | Ewen | 38,000 |

== Player statistics ==
Statistics provided by Dee Archive

| No. | Pos | Nat | Player | Total | | Division B | | Scottish Cup | | League Cup | |
| No. | Pos | Nat | Player | Apps | Goals | Apps | Goals | Apps | Goals | Apps | Goals |
|---|---|---|---|---|---|---|---|---|---|---|---|
| | DF | (Scotland) SCO | Bobby Ancell | 32 | 0 | 24 | 0 | 2 | 0 | 6 | 0 |
| | FW | (Scotland) SCO | Jimmy Andrews | 1 | 0 | 1 | 0 | 0 | 0 | 0 | 0 |
| | GK | (Scotland) SCO | Reuben Bennett | 26 | 0 | 18 | 0 | 2 | 0 | 6 | 0 |
| | MF | (Scotland) SCO | Alfie Boyd | 8 | 0 | 6 | 0 | 2 | 0 | 0 | 0 |
| | MF | (Scotland) SCO | Doug Cowie | 3 | 0 | 3 | 0 | 0 | 0 | 0 | 0 |
| | FW | (Scotland) SCO | Ernie Ewen | 34 | 33 | 25 | 24 | 3 | 3 | 6 | 6 |
| | DF | (Scotland) SCO | Gerry Follon | 32 | 0 | 23 | 0 | 3 | 0 | 6 | 0 |
| | MF | (Scotland) SCO | Tommy Gray | 33 | 0 | 24 | 0 | 3 | 0 | 6 | 0 |
| | FW | (Scotland) SCO | Alistair Gunn | 28 | 6 | 19 | 6 | 3 | 0 | 6 | 0 |
| | FW | (Scotland) SCO | George Hill | 22 | 4 | 18 | 4 | 0 | 0 | 4 | 0 |
| | FW | (Scotland) SCO | Frank Joyner | 4 | 4 | 3 | 4 | 1 | 0 | 0 | 0 |
| | FW | (England) ENG | Albert Juliussen | 22 | 33 | 15 | 30 | 2 | 0 | 5 | 3 |
| | GK | (Scotland) SCO | Johnny Lynch | 9 | 0 | 8 | 0 | 1 | 0 | 0 | 0 |
| | DF | (Scotland) SCO | Alec McIntosh | 5 | 0 | 5 | 0 | 0 | 0 | 0 | 0 |
| | MF | (Scotland) SCO | Gibby McKenzie | 33 | 2 | 24 | 2 | 3 | 0 | 6 | 0 |
| | FW | (Scotland) SCO | Kinnaird Ouchterlonie | 1 | 0 | 1 | 0 | 0 | 0 | 0 | 0 |
| | FW | (Scotland) SCO | Johnny Pattillo | 32 | 22 | 23 | 14 | 3 | 2 | 6 | 6 |
| | FW | (Scotland) SCO | Peter Rattray | 5 | 7 | 5 | 7 | 0 | 0 | 0 | 0 |
| | FW | (England) ENG | Reg Smith | 35 | 4 | 26 | 4 | 3 | 0 | 6 | 0 |
| | FW | (Scotland) SCO | George Stewart | 0 | 0 | 0 | 0 | 0 | 0 | 0 | 0 |
| | FW | (England) ENG | Ronnie Turnbull | 20 | 19 | 15 | 18 | 2 | 1 | 3 | 0 |

== See also ==
- List of Dundee F.C. seasons
