= 1951 Scottish League Cup final =

- Event: 1951–52 Scottish League Cup
Dundee	Rangers
3	2
- Date: 27 October 1951
- Venue: Hampden Park, Glasgow
- Attendance: 92,325

The 1951 Scottish League Cup final was played on 27 October 1951, at Hampden Park in Glasgow and was the final of the sixth Scottish League Cup competition. The final was contested by Dundee and Rangers. Dundee won the match 3–2, thanks to goals by Alf Boyd, Bobby Flavell and Johnny Pattillo.

== Match details ==
27 October 1951

Dundee	3–2	Rangers
Boyd; Flavell; Pattillo		Findlay; Thornton

Hampden Park, Glasgow
Attendance: 92,325
Referee: Jack Mowat

DUNDEE :
GK	Bill Brown
FB	Gerry Follon
FB	Jack Cowan
RH	Tommy Gallacher
CH	Doug Cowie
LH	Alf Boyd (c)
RW	Jimmy Toner
IF	Johnny Pattillo
CF	Bobby Flavell
IF	Billy Steel
LW	George Christie
Manager:
George Anderson

RANGERS :
GK	Bobby Brown
FB	George Young (c)
FB	John Little
RH	Ian McColl
CH	Willie Woodburn
LH	Sammy Cox
RW	Willie Waddell
IF	Willie Findlay
CF	Willie Thornton
IF	Joe Johnson
LW	Eddie Rutherford
Manager:
Bill Struth
