= Doug Cowie =

Doug Cowie may refer to:

- Doug Cowie (footballer) (1926–2021), Scottish footballer
- Doug Cowie (umpire) (born 1946), New Zealand cricket umpire
