= 1954–55 Dundee United F.C. season =

Dundee United
1954–55 season
- Chairman: J. Johnston-Grant
- Manager: Willie MacFadyen (to September); Reg Smith (from September)
- Stadium: Tannadice Park
- Scottish Second Division: 13th W8 D6 L16 F55 A70 P22
- Scottish Cup: Round 4
- League Cup: Group stage

The 1954–55 season was the 47th year of football played by Dundee United, and covers the period from 1 July 1954 to 30 June 1955. United finished in thirteenth place in the Second Division.

== Match results ==
Dundee United played a total of 37 competitive matches during the 1954–55 season.

=== Legend ===
Win
Draw
Loss

All results are written with Dundee United's score first. Own goals in italics

=== Division B ===
Date	Opponent	Venue	Result	Attendance	Scorers
11 September 1954	Stenhousemuir	H	1-1	5,000	
18 September 1954	St Johnstone	A	0-4	5,000	
25 September 1954	Third Lanark	H	2-0	5,000	
2 October 1954	Airdrieonians	A	1-2	6,000	
9 October 1954	Brechin City	H	2-3	5,000	
16 October 1954	Ayr United	A	1-5	5,500	
6 November 1954	Albion Rovers	H	1-1	5,000	
13 November 1954	Dunfermline Athletic	A	1-3	2,500	
20 November 1954	Queen's Park	H	1-3	7,000	
27 November 1954	Alloa Athletic	H	5-4	5,000	
4 December 1954	Hamilton Academical	A	1-1	3,000	
11 December 1954	Greenock Morton	A	0-5	5,000	
18 December 1954	Forfar Athletic	H	3-4	5,000	
25 December 1954	Stenhousemuir	A	4-3	1,500	
1 January 1955	St Johnstone	H	1-5	11,000	
3 January 1955	Third Lanark	A	0-2	6,000	
8 January 1955	Airdrieonains	H	3-4	8,000	
22 January 1955	Ayr United	H	3-0	8,000	
29 January 1955	Arbroath	A	1-3	2,500	
5 February 1955	Brechin City	A	3-2	2,000	
12 February 1955	Cowdenbeath	H	0-0	5,000	
5 March 1955	Dunfermline Athletic	H	1-4	6,000	
12 March 1955	Queen's Park	A	1-1	4,893	
19 March 1955	Alloa Athletic	A	0-0	1,500	
26 March 1955	Hamilton Academical	H	1-2	5,000	
2 April 1955	Greenock Morton	H	5-0	3,000	
9 April 1955	Forfar Athletic	A	4-1	1,000	
16 April 1955	Arbroath	H	6-1	8,000	
23 April 1955	Cowdenbeath	A	1-3	550	
2 May 1955	Albion Rovers	A	2-3	300	

=== Scottish Cup ===
Date	Rd	Opponent	Venue	Result	Attendance	Scorers
23 October 1954	R4	Forfar Athletic	H	1-3	7,000	

=== League Cup ===
Date	Rd	Opponent	Venue	Result	Attendance	Scorers
14 August 1954	G6	Ayr United	H	2-5	8,000	
18 August 1954	G6	Dunfermline Athletic	A	1-3	7,000	
21 August 1954	G6	Brechin City	A	0-2	2,000	
28 August 1954	G6	Ayr United	A	1-3	7,000	
1 September 1954	G6	Dunfermline Athletic	H	3-1	8,000	
4 September 1954	G6	Brechin City	H	0-1	7,000	

== See also ==
- 1954–55 in Scottish football
