= Frank Joyner =

Scottish footballer and manager

Frank Joyner (20 August 1918 – 25 April 1997) was a Scottish football player and manager.

His first senior club was Raith Rovers, where Joyner was part of a team that set a league goalscoring record during the 1937–38 season. He was transferred to Sheffield United for £1650 in April 1938, but his career was then interrupted by the Second World War.

Joyner initially signed up with the Cameronians (Scottish Rifles) and played as a guest for Third Lanark and Chelsea. He served in France behind German lines before returning to the UK and playing as a guest for Norwich City. Joyner then served in south Asia for two years, achieving the rank of captain.

After the war ended, Joyner signed for Dundee. He then moved back to his first club, Raith Rovers, and played for Raith in a Scottish League Cup Final against Rangers. Joyner later played for Hamilton Accies, Kettering Town, Falkirk, Forfar and Stirling Albion. He later managed Third Lanark and Stirling Albion.
