= Johnny Pattillo =

Scottish footballer and manager (1914–2002)

Personal information
- Full name: John Pattillo
- Date of birth: 17 October 1914
- Place of birth: Aberdeen, Scotland
- Date of death: 12 August 2002 (aged 87)
- Position: Forward

Youth career
- Hall Russells

Senior career*
Years	Team	Apps	(Gls)
1938–1946	Aberdeen	10	(11)
1946–1952	Dundee	123	(43)
1952	Aberdeen	0	(0)
1952–1953	St Johnstone	8	(2)
Total		141	(56)

Managerial career
- 1953–1958: St Johnstone
- * Club domestic league appearances and goals

Johnny Pattillo (17 October 1914 – August 2002) was a Scottish football player and manager. He played for Aberdeen, Dundee and finally St Johnstone in 1953. He managed St Johnstone for five years, initially performing both playing and management roles.

Pattillo played during a golden era at Dens, playing right in the heart of it as a prolific striker who won two winners' medals and two runners-up medals as well as scoring a goal in the 1951 League Cup Final victory to cement his place in Dundee's history.

Born in Aberdeen in 1923, Pattillo joined his home town team in 1938 and, like so many players of his generation, had his career interrupted by the Second World War. He joined The Dons one year after their first Scottish Cup Final and left the year before they won the Cup again in 1947 but success was just around the corner for him at Dens. Before he left Pittodrie however he did finish as The Dons' top scorer and won the 1945/46 Southern League Cup against Rangers. The following summer he moved down the east coast to Dundee to join George Anderson's new look Dark Blues for £1,000.

Pattillo made his debut for The Dee on the opening day of the season in a 'B' Division match away to East Fife and was on the scoresheet in a 6–2 win. This high scoring Dark Blues' performance was a sign of things to come for the new season as they went on to score five goals or more on sixteen occasions and scored four goals eight times. His debut season saw him score twenty-two times on the way to winning the title and a further four in the Forfarshire Cup where the season ended on a high with a 5–0 home win over Dundee United in the final and Pattillo getting one of the goals.

In Dundee's first season back in the top flight, Pattillo scored fifteen goals, helping the team to a very respectable fourth‑placed finish. The following year, he increased his tally by two as Dundee also improved their league position by two places, finishing as runners‑up in the 'A' Division.

Having scored fifty-five goals in the last three seasons, he now went the whole of 1949/50 season without scoring at all as Dundee finished a sixth. They had failed to get out of their section in the League Cup and were knocked out in the first round of the Scottish Cup.

Anderson persuaded superstar Billy Steel to join the Dark Blues for a world record fee of £24,000. Inside-left Steel would join inside-right Pattillo in a new dynamic forward line, alongside former Hearts centre-forward Bobby Flavell who joined shortly afterwards. It wasn't long before the trio shot Dundee to two Hampden cup final appearances in the same season.

The first of those appearances was in the League Cup Final of 1951 and Dundee's 3–2 win over Rangers. Pattillo scored in the 5–1 semi-final win over Motherwell at Ibrox but the real glory came for him in the final when he scored the second on sixty-nine minutes. Pattillo ran on to a Flavell through ball and shot high past Bobby Brown in the Rangers goal to put the Dark Blues 2–1 ahead.

Dundee returned to Hampden just five months later when they appeared in their second final of the season but there was no joy this time in the Scottish Cup as Motherwell took the trophy back to Lanarkshire with a 4–0 win. Pattillo played in the final and all five matches en route, scoring four times, which included a brace against Wigtown in a 7–1 second round away win and the only goal in a 1–0 victory over Berwick at Dens in the next round.

The final against Motherwell proved to be Pattillo's penultimate match for The Dee as the following week at Dens against Third Lanark in the final match of the season in the 'A' Division, Pattillo made his last appearance in dark blue, unusually at right back!

That summer he moved back to his hometown team Aberdeen to take up a coaching role but in February 1953 he was appointed manager of St Johnstone and pulled on their light blue shirt eight times to become one of the first player/managers in Scottish Football history.

Pattillo left St Johnstone in 1958 and retired from the game and died aged 79 in August 2002. In his six years at Dens he scored sixty-seven goals, making him twentieth on Dundee's all-time top goalscorers' list, putting him ahead of other high goalscorers Dens Park Tommy Coyne, Ray Stephen, Iain Ferguson, Nacho Novo, Juan Sara, Alec Stott and George Merchant.

Pattillo became the first of the club's goalscoring legends to win a major honour while scoring in the final.

== Career statistics ==
Appearances and goals by club, season and competition
Club	Season	League			Scottish Cup		League Cup		Europe		Total	
Club	Season	Division	Apps	Goals	Apps	Goals	Apps	Goals	Apps	Goals	Apps	Goals
Aberdeen	1938–39	Scottish Division One	9	11	5	4	–	–	–	–	14	15
Aberdeen	1939–40	Scottish Division One	1*	0	–	–	–	–	–	–	1*	0
Aberdeen	1940–41	Competitive Football Cancelled Due to WW2										
Aberdeen	1941–42	Competitive Football Cancelled Due to WW2										
Aberdeen	1942–43	Competitive Football Cancelled Due to WW2										
Aberdeen	1943–44	Competitive Football Cancelled Due to WW2										
Aberdeen	1944–45	Competitive Football Cancelled Due to WW2										
Aberdeen	1945–46	Competitive Football Cancelled Due to WW2										
Aberdeen	Total		10	11	5	4	-	-	-	-	15	15
Dundee	1946–47	Scottish Division Two	23	14	3	2	6	6	0	0	32	22
Dundee	1947–48	Scottish Division One	26	13	1	1	5	1	0	0	32	15
Dundee	1948–49	Scottish Division One	25	9	6	3	9	5	0	0	40	17
Dundee	1949–50	Scottish Division One	21	0	2	0	5	0	0	0	28	0
Dundee	1950–51	Scottish Division One	13	4	1	0	3	0	0	0	17	4
Dundee	1951–52	Scottish Division One	15	3	6	4	2	2	0	0	23	9
Dundee	Total		123	43	19	10	30	14	0	0	172	67
Aberdeen	1952–53	Scottish Division One	0	0	0	0	1	0	0	0	1	0
St Johnstone	1952–53	Scottish Division Two	8	2	–	–	–	–	–	–	8+	2+
Career total			141	56	24+	14+	31+	14+	0	0	196+	84+

*Games played before league season was suspended

== Managerial record ==
Team	From	To	Record				
Team	From	To	P	W	L	D	Win %
St Johnstone	1953	1958	218	98	89	31	44.95%

== Honours at Dundee ==
- Scottish League Cup winners: 1951/52
- Scottish League Championship runners-up: 1948/49
- Scottish Cup runners-up: 1952
- Scottish League B Division winners: 1946/47
- Appearances, Goals:
- League: 123, 43 goals
- Scottish Cup: 19, 10 goals
- League Cup: 30, 14 goals
- Totals: 172, 67 goals
