= Tommy Gallacher =

Scottish footballer (1922–2001)

Personal information
- Date of birth: 13 July 1922
- Place of birth: Renfrew, Scotland
- Date of death: 24 November 2001 (aged 79)
- Place of death: Dundee, Scotland
- Position: Wing half

Senior career*
Years	Team	Apps	(Gls)
?–1947	Queen's Park	5	(0)
1947–1956	Dundee	190	(0)
Total		195	(5)

International career
1949	Scottish League	1	(0)
- * Club domestic league appearances and goals

Tommy Gallacher (13 July 1922 – 24 November 2001) was a Scottish footballer in the late 1940s and 1950s.

== Football career ==
Tommy was only seven years old when his mother died. He was thus brought up by his father, by this stage playing for Falkirk at the end of his career. At one point the thought of the priesthood was a possibility for Tommy. However, that was not to be and he joined amateur side Queen's Park as a young man and played for them throughout World War II. He made five appearances in league matches for Queen's Park when the league resumed in the 1946/47 season.

Tommy moved to Dundee in 1947 to become a professional player. That coincided with one of the greatest eras in the club's history and formed the backbone of the legendary Dundee team that included names such as Bill Brown, Doug Cowie, Alfie Boyd, Bobby Flavell and Billy Steel. Together with Cowie and Boyd in Dundee's half-back line, Gallacher and Dundee missed out on the League Championship on the last day of the 1948/49 season to Rangers.

A few years later though, the same Dundee team won the Scottish League Cup in 1951 and in 1952. Dundee became the first side to retain the League Cup. They could have won a cup double in 1951/52, but lost the 1952 Scottish Cup Final to Motherwell 4–0 at Hampden.

Tommy was unlucky not to have been capped for Scotland. One appearance for the Scottish League against the English League at Newcastle in 1949 was his only international honour. Gallacher was unfortunate that at the time there were an abundance of great Scottish right-halves - the likes of Bobby Evans of Celtic, Ian McColl of Rangers, Tommy Docherty of Preston North End and Jimmy Scoular of Newcastle United.

== Journalist ==
Gallacher's impact on Dundee and Tayside was not just as a footballer because after his retirement in 1956, he became one of the most respected journalists in the country working for the Courier. Not only did he follow both the Dundee teams through their ventures in Europe and at home, but he was also much respected in the peripheral areas of St Johnstone, Raith Rovers and Forfar for the encouragement he gave to the smaller teams. He retired from this job in 1985.

== Personal life ==
Tommy Gallacher was the son of Celtic legend Patsy Gallacher. Tommy played for Dundee in a game in April 1948 which could have relegated Celtic, if Dundee had won. His father was watching in the Dens Park stand and his brother, Willie, was playing for Celtic that day. Celtic won 3-2 and avoided relegation.

Tommy married Cathy in 1952 and they had five children: Brian, Mark, Kevin, Sheila and Patricia.

Former Dundee United, Coventry, Blackburn and Newcastle forward and Scottish international, Kevin Gallacher, is Tommy's nephew. Kevin now works in the media for Sky Sports, BBC Radio 5 Live and BBC Scotland.

Brian's son Sean was briefly a reserve team player at Dundee. Amy Gallacher, Tommy's granddaughter, joined the Celtic women's team in 2022 after five years at Hibernian. The Gallachers are also related to another footballing branch of the family, John Divers and his son of the same name who both played for Celtic.

== Career Recognition ==
At the 2011 Dundee F.C. Hall of Fame ceremony, Tommy Gallacher was awarded the Heritage Award by the club. The award is granted biannually to late greats of the club.

== Honours ==
Dundee

Scottish League Cup: 1951–52, 1952–53

== See also ==
- List of Scottish football families
