= Ernie Copland =

Scottish footballer (1923–1971)

Personal information
- Full name: Ernest George Copland
- Date of birth: 14 October 1923
- Place of birth: Montrose, Scotland
- Date of death: December 1971 (aged 48)
- Place of death: Elizabeth, Australia
- Position: Forward

Youth career
- 1944–1948: Hillside United

Senior career*
| Years | Team | Apps | (Gls) |
| 1948 | Montrose Roselea | | |
| 1948–1950 | Arbroath | 15 | (5) |
| 1950–1951 | Dundee | 6 | (3) |
| 1951–1958 | Raith Rovers | 178 | (105) |
- * Club domestic league appearances and goals

Ernie Copland (14 October 1924 – December 1971) was a Scottish footballer who played for Arbroath, Dundee and Raith Rovers. He was selected for Scotland's 1954 FIFA World Cup squad, but did not travel to the finals and never actually played for the national side.

Although selected for the 22-man squad for the 1954 FIFA World Cup, the Scottish Football Association only budgeted to take 13 players (including only one goalkeeper) to the finals in Switzerland. Copland was one of the players who stayed at home on reserve, with the likes of Bobby Combe and Jimmy Binning.

Copland was chosen as reserve in the Scottish team for the World Cup qualifiers in 1957, and travelled to Basel (Switzerland), Stuttgart (Germany), and Madrid (Spain), but did not play.

Copland died Elizabeth, South Australia in December 1971, at the age of 47.
