= Alex Stott =

Scottish footballer (1925–1998)

Personal information
- Full name: Alexander Gair Stott
- Date of birth: 19 April 1925
- Place of birth: Monifieth, Scotland
- Date of death: 19 December 1998 (aged 73)
- Place of death: East Renfrewshire, Scotland
- Position: Centre forward

Senior career*
Years	Team	Apps	(Gls)
1946–1947	Portsmouth	0	(0)
1947–1949	Dundee	23	(30)
1949–1953	Partick Thistle	84	(59)
1953–1954	Hamilton Academical	2	(1)
Total		109	(90)
- * Club domestic league appearances and goals

Alexander Gair Stott (19 April 1925 – 19 December 1998) was a Scottish footballer who played as a centre forward for clubs including Dundee and Partick Thistle.

With Dundee, he finished as the top goalscorer in Scottish Football League Division One in the 1948–49 season, but achieved notoriety in the last match of that season when he had penalty kick saved in a match against Falkirk which Dundee went on to lose, having been in the position where they would win the title with a victory. At Partick, he was the focal point of an attack-focused team which impressed spectators but did not win any trophies.
