= 1951–52 Scottish League Cup =

Tournament details
- Country: Scotland

Final positions
- Champions: Dundee
- Runners-up: Rangers

The 1951–52 Scottish League Cup was the sixth season of Scotland's second football knockout competition. The competition was won by Dundee, who defeated Rangers in the Final.

== First round ==
=== Group 1 ===
Team	Pld	W	D	L	GF	GA	GR	Pts
Celtic	6	3	2	1	7	4	1.750	8
Morton	6	4	0	2	12	8	1.500	8
Third Lanark	6	2	1	3	11	9	1.222	5
Airdrieonians	6	1	1	4	5	14	0.357	3

Home team	Score	Away team	Date
Celtic	1–1	Third Lanark	11 August 1951
Morton	2–1	Airdrieonians	11 August 1951
Airdrieonians	1–1	Celtic	15 August 1951
Third Lanark	2–0	Morton	15 August 1951
Airdrieonians	2–1	Third Lanark	18 August 1951
Celtic	2–0	Morton	18 August 1951
Airdrieonians	1–3	Morton	25 August 1951
Third Lanark	0–1	Celtic	25 August 1951
Celtic	2–0	Airdrieonians	29 August 1951
Morton	5–2	Third Lanark	29 August 1951
Morton	2–0	Celtic	1 September 1951
Third Lanark	5–0	Airdrieonians	1 September 1951

=== Group 2 ===
Team	Pld	W	D	L	GF	GA	GR	Pts
Motherwell	6	4	1	1	16	9	1.778	9
Partick Thistle	6	3	1	2	10	10	1.000	7
Hibernian	6	2	1	3	12	13	0.923	5
Stirling Albion	6	1	1	4	10	16	0.625	3

Home team	Score	Away team	Date
Motherwell	6–4	Stirling Albion	11 August 1951
Partick Thistle	4–2	Hibernian	11 August 1951
Hibernian	0–4	Motherwell	15 August 1951
Stirling Albion	0–1	Partick Thistle	15 August 1951
Hibernian	4–2	Stirling Albion	18 August 1951
Partick Thistle	0–0	Motherwell	18 August 1951
Hibernian	5–1	Partick Thistle	25 August 1951
Stirling Albion	3–2	Motherwell	25 August 1951
Motherwell	1–0	Hibernian	29 August 1951
Partick Thistle	2–0	Stirling Albion	29 August 1951
Motherwell	3–2	Partick Thistle	1 September 1951
Stirling Albion	1–1	Hibernian	1 September 1951

=== Group 3 ===
Team	Pld	W	D	L	GF	GA	GR	Pts
Dundee	6	3	1	2	14	10	1.400	7
Heart of Midlothian	6	3	1	2	15	12	1.250	7
St Mirren	6	2	2	2	13	13	1.000	6
Raith Rovers	6	2	0	4	6	13	0.462	4

Home team	Score	Away team	Date
Heart of Midlothian	1–0	Raith Rovers	11 August 1951
St Mirren	2–2	Dundee	11 August 1951
Dundee	2–1	Heart of Midlothian	15 August 1951
Raith Rovers	3–2	St Mirren	15 August 1951
Dundee	5–0	Raith Rovers	18 August 1951
St Mirren	5–5	Heart of Midlothian	18 August 1951
Dundee	0–1	St Mirren	25 August 1951
Raith Rovers	2–0	Heart of Midlothian	25 August 1951
Heart of Midlothian	5–2	Dundee	29 August 1951
St Mirren	2–0	Raith Rovers	29 August 1951
Heart of Midlothian	3–1	St Mirren	1 September 1951
Raith Rovers	1–3	Dundee	1 September 1951

=== Group 4 ===
Team	Pld	W	D	L	GF	GA	GR	Pts
Rangers	6	4	1	1	15	6	2.500	9
East Fife	6	3	1	2	10	9	1.111	7
Queen of the South	6	2	0	4	11	16	0.688	4
Aberdeen	6	2	0	4	10	15	0.667	4

Home team	Score	Away team	Date
Aberdeen	5–4	Queen of the South	11 August 1951
East Fife	0–0	Rangers	11 August 1951
Queen of the South	3–2	East Fife	15 August 1951
Rangers	2–1	Aberdeen	15 August 1951
East Fife	3–0	Aberdeen	18 August 1951
Queen of the South	0–3	Rangers	18 August 1951
Queen of the South	2–0	Aberdeen	25 August 1951
Rangers	4–1	East Fife	25 August 1951
Aberdeen	2–1	Rangers	29 August 1951
East Fife	1–0	Queen of the South	29 August 1951
Aberdeen	2–3	East Fife	1 September 1951
Rangers	5–2	Queen of the South	1 September 1951

=== Group 5 ===
Team	Pld	W	D	L	GF	GA	GR	Pts
Falkirk	6	6	0	0	23	4	5.750	12
Stenhousemuir	6	2	1	3	12	16	0.750	5
Dundee United	6	1	2	3	6	10	0.600	4
Cowdenbeath	6	1	1	4	7	18	0.389	3

Home team	Score	Away team	Date
Dundee United	1–1	Cowdenbeath	11 August 1951
Falkirk	3–1	Stenhousemuir	11 August 1951
Cowdenbeath	0–5	Falkirk	15 August 1951
Stenhousemuir	1–1	Dundee United	15 August 1951
Cowdenbeath	2–3	Stenhousemuir	18 August 1951
Falkirk	3–0	Dundee United	18 August 1951
Cowdenbeath	2–0	Dundee United	25 August 1951
Stenhousemuir	2–5	Falkirk	25 August 1951
Dundee United	4–2	Stenhousemuir	29 August 1951
Falkirk	6–1	Cowdenbeath	29 August 1951
Dundee United	0–1	Falkirk	1 September 1951
Stenhousemuir	3–1	Cowdenbeath	1 September 1951

=== Group 6 ===
Team	Pld	W	D	L	GF	GA	GR	Pts
Queen's Park	6	4	1	1	15	7	2.143	9
Alloa Athletic	6	3	0	3	9	9	1.000	6
Hamilton Academical	6	2	1	3	8	10	0.800	5
Dunfermline Athletic	6	2	0	4	7	13	0.538	4

Home team	Score	Away team	Date
Dunfermline Athletic	4–1	Alloa Athletic	11 August 1951
Queen's Park	1–2	Hamilton Academical	11 August 1951
Alloa Athletic	2–0	Queen's Park	15 August 1951
Hamilton Academical	1–4	Dunfermline Athletic	15 August 1951
Hamilton Academical	0–1	Alloa Athletic	18 August 1951
Queen's Park	2–0	Dunfermline Athletic	18 August 1951
Alloa Athletic	2–2	Dunfermline Athletic	25 August 1951
Hamilton Academical	2–3	Queen's Park	25 August 1951
Dunfermline Athletic	3–0	Hamilton Academical	29 August 1951
Queen's Park	2–1	Alloa Athletic	29 August 1951
Alloa Athletic	1–2	Hamilton Academical	1 September 1951
Dunfermline Athletic	2–1	Queen's Park	1 September 1951

=== Group 7 ===
Team	Pld	W	D	L	GF	GA	GR	Pts
St Johnstone	6	4	1	1	14	8	1.750	9
Clyde	6	4	0	2	16	8	2.000	8
Albion Rovers	6	3	0	3	10	14	0.714	6
Arbroath	6	0	1	5	10	20	0.500	1

Home team	Score	Away team	Date
Albion Rovers	3–4	St Johnstone	11 August 1951
Arbroath	2–3	Clyde	11 August 1951
Clyde	4–0	Albion Rovers	14 August 1951
St Johnstone	4–0	Arbroath	15 August 1951
Arbroath	0–1	Albion Rovers	18 August 1951
St Johnstone	3–2	Clyde	18 August 1951
Clyde	5–2	Arbroath	25 August 1951
St Johnstone	0–1	Albion Rovers	25 August 1951
Albion Rovers	0–2	Clyde	28 August 1951
Arbroath	2–2	St Johnstone	29 August 1951
Albion Rovers	5–4	Arbroath	1 September 1951
Clyde	0–1	St Johnstone	1 September 1951

=== Group 8 ===
Team	Pld	W	D	L	GF	GA	GR	Pts
Forfar Athletic	6	4	1	1	13	8	1.625	9
Kilmarnock	6	4	0	2	9	4	2.250	8
Ayr United	6	2	0	4	11	12	0.917	4
Dumbarton	6	1	1	4	6	15	0.400	3

Home team	Score	Away team	Date
Dumbarton	3–4	Forfar Athletic	11 August 1951
Kilmarnock	3–0	Ayr United	11 August 1951
Ayr United	5–0	Dumbarton	15 August 1951
Forfar Athletic	2–1	Kilmarnock	15 August 1951
Ayr United	2–3	Forfar Athletic	18 August 1951
Dumbarton	1–0	Kilmarnock	18 August 1951
Ayr United	1–2	Kilmarnock	25 August 1951
Forfar Athletic	1–1	Dumbarton	25 August 1951
Dumbarton	1–3	Ayr United	29 August 1951
Kilmarnock	1–0	Forfar Athletic	29 August 1951
Forfar Athletic	3–0	Ayr United	1 September 1951
Kilmarnock	2–0	Dumbarton	1 September 1951

== Quarter-finals ==
=== First leg ===
Home team	Score	Away team	Date
Celtic	4–1	Forfar Athletic	15 September 1951
Dunfermline Athletic	1–0	Rangers	15 September 1951
Falkirk	0–0	Dundee	15 September 1951
St Johnstone	0–4	Motherwell	15 September 1951

=== Second leg ===
Home team	Score	Away team	Date	Agg
Dundee	2–1	Falkirk	19 September 1951	2–1
Forfar Athletic	1–1	Celtic	19 September 1951	2–5
Motherwell	3–0	St Johnstone	19 September 1951	7–0
Rangers	3–1	Dunfermline Athletic	19 September 1951	3–2

== Semi-finals ==
Home team	Score	Away team	Date
Dundee	5–1	Motherwell	13 October 1951
Rangers	3–0	Celtic	13 October 1951

== Final ==
27 October 1951

Dundee	3–2	Rangers
Boyd; Flavell; Pattillo		Findlay; Thornton

Hampden Park, Glasgow
Attendance: 92,325
