= Reg Smith =

English footballer (1912–2004)

Personal information
- Full name: James Christopher Reginald Smith
- Date of birth: 20 January 1912
- Place of birth: Battersea, England
- Date of death: 6 January 2004 (aged 91)
- Place of death: Stevenage, England
- Height: 5 ft 10 in (1.78 m)
- Position: Outside left

Senior career*
Years	Team	Apps	(Gls)
1931–1935	Hitchin Town		
1935–1946	Millwall	117	(21)
1946–1948	Dundee		

International career
1938	England	2	(2)

Managerial career
- 1948: Corby Town
- 1954–1957: Dundee United
- 1957–1959: Falkirk
- 1959–1961: Millwall
- 1961: Addington
- 1961–1963: Bedford Town
- Addington
- Cape Town Spurs
- 1971–1972: Bedford Town
- * Club domestic league appearances and goals

James Christopher Reginald Smith (20 January 1912 – 6 January 2004), was an English football player and manager who played as an outside left.

== Playing career ==
The son of a South African rugby union international, Smith began his career as an amateur with Hitchin Town in the early 1930s, playing in one of that club's finest teams and helping them to the Spartan League title in 1935, before turning professional when he joined Millwall later that year.

After a slow start at The Den, Smith came to terms with professional football in 1936–37, helping his new side to FA Cup semi-finals, the first time a team from the third tier of English football had reached that stage. In the 1937–38 season Smith enjoyed even greater success, as Millwall hurtled to the Division Three South title, while also claiming the London FA Challenge Cup by defeating Crystal Palace.

Smith became Millwall's last full England internationalist in 1938, when he was selected for two games in seven days in November, despite only playing in the English second tier at the time. He scored twice on his debut versus Norway in a 4–0 win, but didn't score in a 7–0 defeat of Northern Ireland.

When the Second World War broke out in 1939, Smith, like many other footballers, found his career disrupted. He joined the RAF and continued to appear sporadically for Millwall when his military schedule allowed. He was transferred to RAF Leuchars in Fife in 1944 and subsequently turned out for Dundee as a guest in the war-time North-Eastern League. When the hostilities finished, he joined the Dark Blues on a permanent deal in March 1946, helping them to the B Division title in 1946–47.

== Managerial career ==
In 1948, Smith was appointed player-manager of Corby Town upon the club's formation but left after only a couple of months for family reasons, returning north to Dundee where he became a coach. He moved into management with Dundee United in September 1954, leaving his coaching post at rivals Dundee to join United. After two seasons of steady mid-table finishes, he resigned to take over as manager of Falkirk (then bottom of Division One) in January 1957. Three months later, Smith had saved the Bairns from relegation and led his new club to victory in the Scottish Cup.

In the summer of 1959, Smith was approached by old club Millwall to replace Jimmy Seed as manager, and he returned to the Londoners for the beginning of the 1959–60 season. His side started well, setting a Millwall record 19 match unbeaten run. However, a high proportion of draws ensured they finished no higher than 5th, just missing out on promotion from Division Four. Despite challenging at the top of the table again the following season, Millwall sacked Smith in January 1961, replacing him with assistant Ron Gray. He then moved to South Africa to become manager of Addington, but returned to England later in the year when he was appointed manager of Bedford Town in November 1961. He resigned in September 1963, but was persuaded to stay on until December. He subsequently returned to Addington and then managed Cape Town City F.C. before returning to Bedford in November 1971, remaining in post until June 1972. He was appointed assistant manager at Stevenage Athletic for the 1972–73 season, before going on to work at a computer company.

== Honours ==
=== As a player ===
Millwall

- Division Three South: 1937–38

Dundee

- B Division: 1946–47

=== As a manager ===
Falkirk

- Scottish Cup: 1956–57
