= Bill Brown (footballer, born 1931) =

Scottish footballer

Personal information
- Full name: William Dallas Fyfe Brown
- Date of birth: 8 October 1931
- Place of birth: Arbroath, Angus, Scotland
- Date of death: 30 November 2004 (aged 73)
- Place of death: Simcoe, Ontario, Canada
- Height: 1.78 m (5 ft 10 in)
- Position: Goalkeeper

Youth career
- Carnoustie Panmure

Senior career*
Years	Team	Apps	(Gls)
1949–1959	Dundee	215	(0)
1959–1966	Tottenham Hotspur	222	(0)
1966–1967	Northampton Town	17	(0)
1967	Toronto Falcons	16	(0)
Total		470	(0)

International career
1956	Scotland B	1	(0)
1956–1958	Scottish League XI	8	(0)
1958	SFL trial v SFA	1	(0)
1958–1965	Scotland	28	(0)
1959	SFA trial v SFL	1	(0)
- * Club domestic league appearances and goals

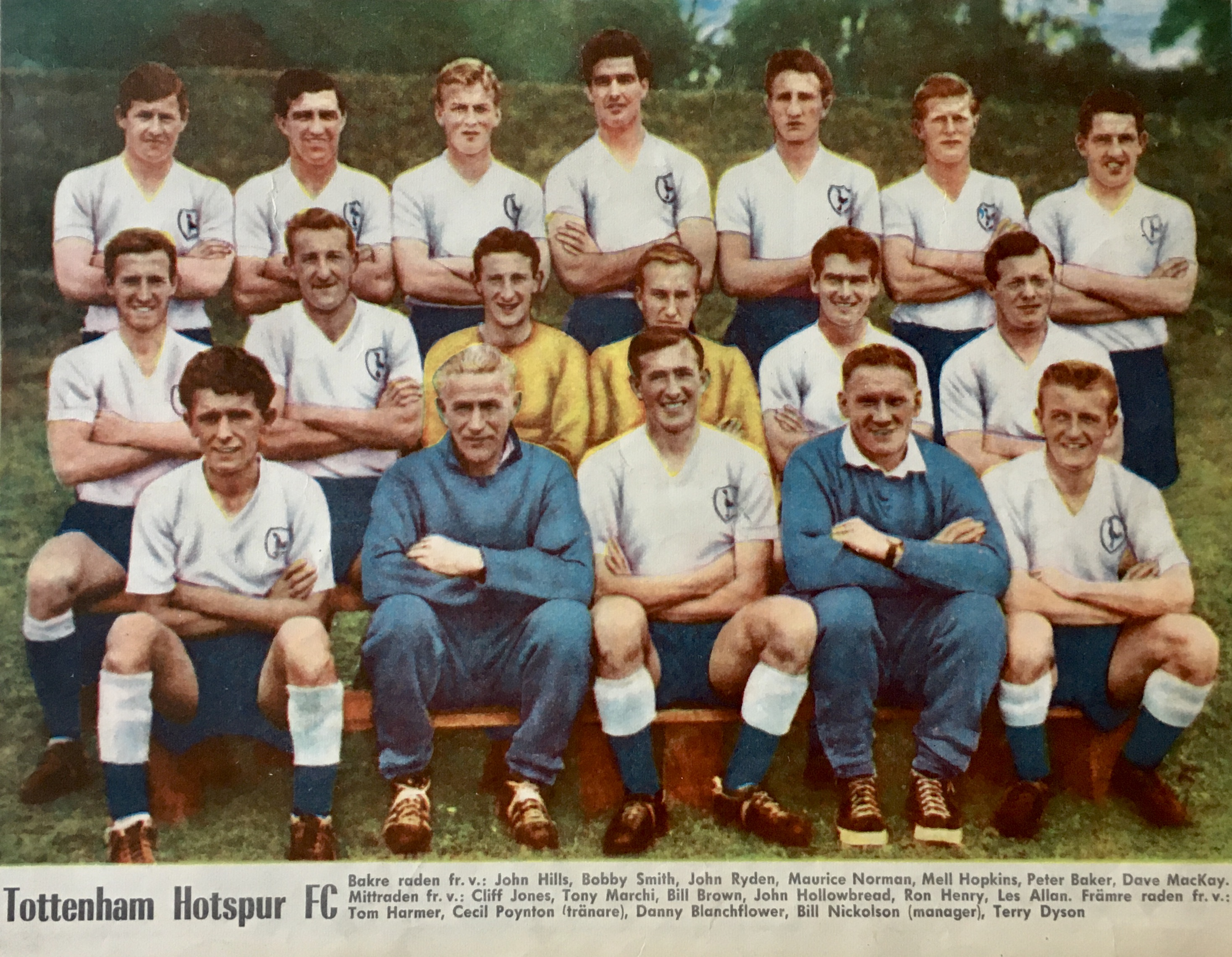
Tottenham Hotspur in 1960 with Bill Brown, John Hollowbread and Danny Blanchflower in the team with Bill Nicholson as manager.

William Dallas Fyfe Brown (8 October 1931 – 30 November 2004) was a Scottish football goalkeeper.

Brown played for Dundee between 1949 and 1959, and for Tottenham Hotspur between 1959 and 1966. He was part of the Spurs team that won the Double of Football League and FA Cup in 1961 - the first club to achieve the feat in the 20th century. He was also capped 28 times for the Scotland national team.

== Career ==
=== Dundee ===
Brown played as a youth for Carnoustie Panmure. He started his senior career with Dundee as a teenager and made over 200 appearances in the Scottish Football League.

=== Tottenham Hotspur ===
Brown was signed in 1959 for £16,500 to Tottenham Hotspur in June 1959. He was at White Hart Lane for seven years, winning the Double in 1961 missing only one game the entire season. He also helped the team win the FA Cup again in 1962, and the European Cup Winners' Cup in 1963. He produced one of his best performances in the match against Bratislava in quarter-final of 1962–63 European Cup Winners' Cup.

He suffered injuries in the mid-1960s, and with the arrival of Pat Jennings to the team, he began to lose his place in the starting lineup. He played his last game for the club in a friendly in October 1966, and transferred to Northampton Town the same month.

=== Northampton and Toronto Falcons ===
He next had a spell at Northampton Town. Brown then moved to Canada to end his playing days with the Toronto Falcons during the 1967 National Professional Soccer League season.

=== International ===
Brown was capped 28 times for Scotland and played in the 1958 World Cup. He also played for his country at 'B' team, youth and schoolboy level. Brown also represented the Scottish League XI while he was with Dundee.

== After playing ==
After he finished playing, he stayed in Canada and worked as a property developer and for the government. He died in 2004, aged 73. The news broke just before Tottenham played a League Cup tie against Liverpool and, as a tribute, they wore black armbands for the occasion.

== Honours ==
Dundee

- Scottish League Cup: 1951–52

Tottenham Hotspur

- Football League First Division: 1960–61
- FA Cup: 1960–61, 1961–62
- FA Charity Shield: 1961, 1962
- European Cup Winners' Cup: 1962–63
