= Alistair Gunn =

Scottish footballer

Personal information
- Full name: Alistair Robert Gunn
- Date of birth: 2 November 1924
- Place of birth: Broughty Ferry, Dundee, Scotland
- Date of death: 3 April 2010 (aged 85)
- Place of death: Dundee, Scotland
- Position: Winger

Senior career*
Years	Team	Apps	(Gls)
1946–1951	Dundee	103	(26)
1951–1953	Huddersfield Town	83	(11)
1953–1955	Bournemouth & Boscombe Athletic	27	(2)
1955–1957	Arbroath	20	(2)
- * Club domestic league appearances and goals

Alistair Robert Gunn (2 November 1924 – 3 April 2010) was a professional footballer, who played for Dundee, Huddersfield Town, Bournemouth & Boscombe Athletic & Arbroath. He was born in Broughty Ferry, Dundee, Scotland.
