= George Stewart (footballer, born 1927) =

Scottish footballer

Personal information
- Full name: George Thompson Scott Stewart
- Date of birth: 11 February 1927
- Place of birth: Buckie, Scotland
- Date of death: 4 June 2011 (aged 84)
- Place of death: Buckie, Scotland
- Position: Centre forward

Senior career*
Years	Team	Apps	(Gls)
- Buckie Thistle
1947–1950	Dundee	11	(4)
1950–1954	St Mirren	75	(38)
1954	Worcester City		
1954–1958	Accrington Stanley	182	(136)
1958–1960	Coventry City	40	(23)
1960–1961	Carlisle United	7	(2)
- Buckie Thistle
Total		315	(203)
- * Club domestic league appearances and goals

George Thompson Scott Stewart (17 February 1927 – 4 June 2011) was a Scottish professional footballer who played as a centre forward.

== Career ==
Born in Buckie, Stewart played for Buckie Thistle, Dundee, St Mirren, Worcester City, Accrington Stanley, Coventry City and Carlisle United. At Accrington Stanley, Stewart broke the club's goalscoring record during the 1955–56 season, scoring 35 goals.
