= Billy Steel =

Scottish footballer

Personal information
- Full name: William Steel
- Date of birth: 1 May 1923
- Place of birth: Denny, Stirlingshire, Scotland
- Date of death: 13 May 1982 (aged 59)
- Place of death: Lancaster, California, United States
- Position: Inside left

Youth career
- Dunipace Thistle
- 1938: Bo'ness Cadora
- 1938–1939: Leicester City

Senior career*
Years	Team	Apps	(Gls)
1939–1942	St Mirren	0	(0)
1942–1947	Morton	9	(2)
1947–1950	Derby County	109	(27)
1950–1954	Dundee	94	(27)
Total		212	(56)

International career
1947–1952	Scottish Football League XI	4	(2)
1947–1953	Scotland	30	(12)
1947	United Kingdom	1	(1)
- * Club domestic league appearances and goals

William Steel (1 May 1923 – 13 May 1982) was a Scottish professional footballer who played for St Mirren, Morton, Derby County, Dundee and the Scotland national team.

One of Scotland's greatest inside forwards, Billy Steel combined a brilliant footballing brain with a busy work ethic and explosive shot. Steel was the subject of two record transfer fees during his career. As well as receiving 30 caps for Scotland, Steel made four appearances with the Scottish League, was a Scottish Cup finalist in 1952, and was a Scottish League Cup winner in 1952 and 1953. He scored a memorable goal for a Great Britain XI against the Rest of Europe in 1947. He was inducted into Scottish Football Hall of Fame in 2006.

== Early career ==
Steel began his career at local juvenile side Dunipace Thistle, signing for Junior side Bo'ness Cadora in the summer of 1938, whilst still 15 years of age. He played several games at inside-left before being developed into a winger by Cadora. Leicester City manager Frank Womack was determined to get his man halfway through the season and took him on to the Filbert Street ground staff at the end of 1938; things did not work out as the boss was sacked and nobody remembered to renew his contract.

While still contracted to Morton, Steel played for the British Army of the Rhine, (BAOR) who, in 1944 to 1946, were re-establishing footballing connections with other teams on the Continent. The team "visited" France, the Netherlands, Poland, Switzerland, the Channel Islands and Germany, and Steel played along with such notables as Leslie Compton, Eddie Hapgood, and Matt Busby. Demobbed in December 1946 he returned to Morton.

== Derby County ==
His £15,500 transfer from Morton to Derby County in 1947 was a then British transfer record. He was brought to Derby County after playing just a few first team games for Morton and was a good buy, going on to play for three seasons at the Baseball Ground. In that time he made 124 appearances, scoring 35 goals. Steel was not always popular at Derby, especially among his fellow professionals: one dressing room incident ended in Steel being threatened with being hung on a cloakroom peg by a member of his own team. Players often accused Steel of saving his best performances for when the Rams travelled down to play the London teams. He was further disliked for his "moonlighting" (though in the days of the maximum wage for footballers he could hardly be blamed); he received payments for articles that he wrote for several newspapers, enabling him to have a more luxurious life style than his teammates. A deal with News Chronicle was said to be worth as much again as his football wage.

== Dundee ==
Steel left Derby in September 1950 to return to his native Scotland, Dundee paying a Scottish record transfer fee of £22,500. He helped the club to win the Scottish League Cup in 1951–52 and 1952–53. He was also a finalist in the 1951–52 Scottish Cup. He retired as a player in 1954.

In May 2009, Steel was inducted into Dundee F.C.'s Hall of Fame.

== International career ==
He won a total of 30 caps for Scotland, scoring 12 goals. Despite having played only a handful of league games for Morton, he was selected for a Great Britain XI for a match against the Rest of Europe in 1947, in which he scored from 30 yards out in a 6–1 win.

== Retirement and emigration ==
In 1954 he announced he was emigrating to the US, where he managed the Los Angeles Danes, before later working in advertising.

== Playing style ==
Billy Steel had springs for muscles, a choirboy's face that masked a devouring, often ruthless determination to achieve football perfection, a caustic tongue that frequently angered team-mates more bitterly than opponents, and a style and ability that, in this modern age, would have the wealthy clubs of Europe bidding frantically for his transfer. Unlike so many of his predecessors, who were indelibly stamped with the style of their birthplace, Steel was classless. No one watching this chirpy little man in action could have said from which soccer school he graduated. His touch was Scottish of course, but later in his career he welded to that eternal grace an iron physique. He belonged to the elite corp of players: the global greats. His secret was that of Denis Law, an agile brain, a puma's pounce, and extraordinary gymnastic ability that put him a move ahead of his colleagues. There was nothing svelte about Steel: he exuded vitality, he had the killer instinct of a boxing champion, he was the type of aggressive attacker who was so keen to win that he would have sworn at his best friend if he felt he hadn't been pulling his weight.

== Career statistics ==
=== International appearances ===
Appearances and goals by national team and year
National team	Year	Apps	Goals
Scotland	1947	5	3
Scotland	1948	4	0
Scotland	1949	4	4
Scotland	1950	7	4
Scotland	1951	6	1
Scotland	1952	2	0
Scotland	1953	2	0
Total		30	12

=== International goals ===
Scores and results list Scotland's goal tally first.

#	Date	Venue	Opponent	Score	Result	Competition	Ref
1.	18 May 1947	Stade Heysel, Brussels	Belgium	1–1	1–2	Friendly match	
2.	24 May 1947	Stade Municipal, Luxembourg City	Luxembourg	2–0	6–0	Friendly match	
3.	24 May 1947	Stade Municipal, Luxembourg City	Luxembourg	3–0	6–0	Friendly match	
4.	9 April 1949	Wembley Stadium, London	England	2–0	3–1	1948–49 British Home Championship	
5.	27 April 1949	Hampden Park, Glasgow	France	1–0	2–0	Friendly	
6.	27 April 1949	Hampden Park, Glasgow	France	2–0	2–0	Friendly	
7.	1 October 1949	Windsor Park, Belfast	Ireland	3–0	8–2	1949–50 British Home Championship	
8.	1 November 1950	Hampden Park, Glasgow	Ireland	3–1	6–1	1950–51 British Home Championship	
9.	1 November 1950	Hampden Park, Glasgow	Ireland	4–1	6–1	1950–51 British Home Championship	
10.	1 November 1950	Hampden Park, Glasgow	Ireland	5–1	6–1	1950–51 British Home Championship	
11.	1 November 1950	Hampden Park, Glasgow	Ireland	6–1	6–1	1950–51 British Home Championship	
12.	12 May 1951	Hampden Park, Glasgow	Denmark	1–1	3–1	Friendly match	

== See also ==
- List of Scotland national football team hat-tricks
