= Jimmy Andrews =

Scottish footballer

Personal information
- Full name: James Patrick Andrews
- Date of birth: 1 February 1927
- Place of birth: Invergordon, Scotland
- Date of death: 12 September 2012 (aged 85)
- Place of death: Bridgend, Wales
- Position: Winger

Senior career*
Years	Team	Apps	(Gls)
1946–1951	Dundee	41	(5)
1951–1956	West Ham United	114	(21)
1956–1959	Leyton Orient	35	(8)
1959–1962	Queens Park Rangers	82	(15)

Managerial career
- 1974–1978: Cardiff City
- * Club domestic league appearances and goals

James Patrick Andrews (1 February 1927 – 12 September 2012) was a Scottish footballer who played as a left winger.

== Biography ==
Andrews was born on 1 February 1927 in Invergordon, Scotland. He was signed by English club West Ham United from Dundee in November 1951 for £4,750. He played his first game for the club on 24 November 1951, against Everton. His final game for West Ham came against Plymouth Argyle on 31 March 1956. He made a total of 120 League and FA Cup appearances for the Upton Park club. After leaving West Ham, Andrews joined nearby Leyton Orient and scored eight goals in 36 league appearances for them. He later played for Queens Park Rangers, scoring 15 goals in 82 League games, before retiring.

After his playing career ended, Andrews worked as a coach with Queens Park Ranger, Luton Town and Tottenham Hotspur. He became manager of Cardiff City and took them to a double of promotion and Welsh Cup winners in 1975–76. He was sacked in November 1978 and later worked as a scout for Southampton.

Andrews died on 12 September 2012, aged 85.

== Managerial statistics ==
Team	Country	From	To	Record				
Team	Country	From	To	G	W	D	L	Win %
Cardiff City	(Wales)	1 May 1974	6 November 1978	190	63	51	76	33.16
Total				190	63	51	76	33.16
