= George Anderson (footballer, born 1887) =

Scottish footballer and manager (1887-1956)

Personal information
- Full name: George Albert Anderson
- Date of birth: 6 June 1887
- Place of birth: Haydon Bridge, England
- Date of death: 28 May 1956 (aged 68)
- Place of death: Dundee, Scotland
- Position: Goalkeeper

Senior career*
Years	Team	Apps	(Gls)
1907–1910	Haydon Bridge		
1910–1911	Mickley Colliery Welfare		
1911–1914	Sunderland	10	(0)
1914–1917	Aberdeen	100	(0)
1917–1918	Dundee	18	(0)
1918–1922	Aberdeen	105	(0)

Managerial career
- 1941–1942: Aberdeen (caretaker)
- 1944–1954: Dundee
- * Club domestic league appearances and goals

George Albert Anderson (6 June 1887 – 28 May 1956) was an English professional footballer, best remembered for his 10 years as manager of Dundee between 1944 and 1954. As a player, Anderson played as a goalkeeper and made over 200 Scottish League appearances for Aberdeen. He also played in the Football League for Sunderland. Between his retirement as a player as his appointment as manager of Dundee, Anderson served Aberdeen as a director and manager.

== Personal life ==
Anderson served in the Royal Artillery during the First World War.

== Career statistics ==
=== Club ===
Appearances and goals by club, season and competition
Club	Season	League			National Cup		Other		Total	
Club	Season	Division	Apps	Goals	Apps	Goals	Apps	Goals	Apps	Goals
Sunderland	1911–12	First Division	8	0	0	0	—		8	0
Sunderland	1912–13	First Division	2	0	0	0	—		2	0
Sunderland	Total		10	0	0	0	—		10	0
Aberdeen	1914–15	Scottish Division One	29	0	—		—		29	0
Aberdeen	1915–16	Scottish Division One	33	0	—		2 (Note: Appearances in Robertson Cup)	0	35	0
Aberdeen	1916–17	Scottish Division One	38	0	—		—		38	0
Aberdeen	Total		100	0	—		2	0	102	0
Aberdeen	1919–20	Scottish Division One	42	0	4	0	1	0	47	0
Aberdeen	1920–21	Scottish Division One	38	0	4	0	—		42	0
Aberdeen	1921–22	Scottish Division One	25	0	0	0	—		25	0
Aberdeen	Total		205	0	8	0	3	0	216	0
Career total			215	0	8	0	5	0	226	0

=== Manager ===
Managerial record by team and tenure
Team	From	To	Record				
Team	From	To	P	W	D	L	Win %
Dundee	5 May 1944	19 July 1954	321	162	63	96	50.5
Total			321	162	63	96	50.5

== Honours ==
Dundee

- Southern League B Division: 1945–46
- Scottish League Division B: 1946–47
- Scottish League Cup: 1951–52, 1952–53

Individual

- Dundee Hall of Fame
