= Doug Cowie (footballer) =

Scottish footballer and manager (1926–2021)

Personal information
- Full name: Douglas Cowie
- Date of birth: 5 May 1926
- Place of birth: Aberdeen, Scotland
- Date of death: 26 November 2021 (aged 95)
- Place of death: Dundee, Scotland
- Height: 5 ft 11 in (1.80 m)
- Positions: Half back; centre-back

Youth career
- Caledonian Juveniles
- Aberdeen St Clement's

Senior career*
Years	Team	Apps	(Gls)
1945–1961	Dundee	341	(20)
1961–1963	Greenock Morton	61	(9)
Total		402	(29)

International career
1953	Scotland B	1	(0)
1953–1958	Scotland	20	(0)
1953–1956	Scottish League XI	3	(0)
1958	SFA trial v SFL	1	(0)

Managerial career
- 1963–1964: Raith Rovers
- * Club domestic league appearances and goals

Douglas Cowie (5 May 1926 – 26 November 2021) was a Scottish footballer who played for Dundee, Greenock Morton and the Scotland national team. He played initially as a central defender but later converted to a left half.

== Club career ==
Signed for Dundee by manager George Anderson, Cowie went on to play 341 times for the club in the Scottish Football League alone, many of them as captain. He was part of the Dundee side that won back-to-back League Cups in 1951–52 and 1952–53, also played in the 1952 Scottish Cup Final and was a member of the squad that missed out on winning the League Championship by one point in the 1948–49 season.

Cowie left Dundee in 1961 and had a two-year spell with Greenock Morton as a player-coach. He was Raith Rovers manager for the 1963–64 season but left the Kirkcaldy club to rejoin the Morton coaching staff in the summer of 1964. He later worked at Dundee United in coaching and scouting capacities.

On 3 April 2009, Cowie was inducted into Dundee's Hall of Fame.

== International career ==
Cowie won all 20 of his Scotland caps while with Dundee. He made his international debut against England in April 1953. He was involved in Scotland's first two World Cup appearances, playing both matches in 1954 and two of three matches in 1958; Scotland's 3–2 defeat to Paraguay at the 1958 World Cup was his final appearance for Scotland. He also appeared once for the Scotland B team and three times for the Scottish League representative team.

== Death ==
Cowie died on 26 November 2021, at the age of 95. He was the last surviving player of the 1954 and 1958 Scottish World Cup teams.
