= Alf Boyd =

Scottish footballer

Personal information
- Date of birth: 22 October 1920
- Place of birth: Dundee, Scotland
- Date of death: 3 July 1998 (aged 77)
- Place of death: South Africa
- Position: Wing half

Senior career*
Years	Team	Apps	(Gls)
- Dundee North End
1946–1947	St Johnstone	6	(2)
1947–1953	Dundee	170	(18)
- Marist Bros.
Total		176	(20)

International career
1949	Scottish League XI	1	(0)

Managerial career
- Marist Bros.
- Durban City
- * Club domestic league appearances and goals

Alf Boyd (22 October 1920 – 3 July 1998) was a Scottish professional footballer who played as a wing half.

== Career ==
Born in Dundee, Boyd played in Scotland for Dundee North End, St Johnstone and Dundee; he was later player-coach of Marist Bros. in South Africa. He went on to manage Durban City.

Boyd played 235 games and scored 27 times for Dundee. He only missed six games in that period. He captained Dundee to consecutive League Cup wins.

Boyd was later on the backroom staff when Dundee won the League in 1962.

== International career ==
Boyd played for the Scotland Schoolboys team against England in 1935.

His solitary senior international honour was being selected for the Scottish League against the Football League in 1949.

== Honours ==
Dundee

- Scottish A Division:
  - Runners-up: 1948–49
- Scottish B Division
  - Champions: 1946–47
- Scottish Cup:
  - Runners-up: 1951–52
- Scottish League Cup:
  - Winners: 1951–52, 1952–53
- Forfarshire Cup
  - Winners: 1946–47, 1948–49
  - Runners-up: 1950–51

Individual

- Dundee FC Hall of Fame:
  - Legends Award: 2013
