= Dundee F.C. =

Association football club in Dundee, Scotland

Dundee
- Full name: Dundee Football Club
- Nicknames: The Dee; The Dark Blues
- Founded: 1893; 133 years ago
- Ground: Dens Park
- Capacity: 11,775
- Coordinates: 56°28′29″N 2°58′25″W
- Chairman: Tim Keyes
- Head coach: Steven Pressley
- League: Scottish Premiership
- 2025–26: Scottish Premiership, 8th of 12
- Website: dundeefc.co.uk
Home colours	Away colours

Dundee Football Club is a professional football club based in the city of Dundee, Scotland, founded in 1893. The team are nicknamed "The Dark Blues" or "The Dee". The club plays its home matches at Dens Park and currently play in the Scottish Premiership.

The club was formed after a merger between clubs Dundee East End and Dundee Our Boys in order to apply for the SFL. Within a decade they had become a major force in Scottish football, finishing as league runners-up three times in the 1900s, and finished the decade as Scottish Cup winners in 1910. They remained a major side in Scottish football before a decline in the 1930s. After the return to football in the aftermath of the Second World War, the club experienced a revival in the late 1940s and 1950s under George Anderson with another runners-up finish and consecutive Scottish League Cup wins in 1952 and 1953.

The club's most successful era was in the 1960s when, under the management of Bob Shankly, Dundee won the Scottish Football League title in 1962, before reaching the semi-finals of the 1962–63 European Cup the following season. The club again won the League Cup in the 1973–74 season. Since the late 1980s the club has experienced issues with frequent relegations and financial issues, though has found stability in the latter as of late.

The club has a long-standing rivalry with Dundee United, whose stadium is situated on the same street as Dundee's. It is the most localised football derby in Great Britain. Matches between the two are called the Dundee derby, are fiercely contested and are often considered one of the most exciting fixtures in Scottish football. Despite this, the rivalry is much friendlier than other Scottish derbies such as the Old Firm, with families often split down the middle in terms of support.

== History ==
=== Late 19th and early 20th century ===
Dundee F.C. was formed in 1893 by the merger of two local clubs, East End and Our Boys, with the intention of gaining election to the Scottish Football League (SFL). Their application was successful and they played their first League game on 12 August 1893 at West Craigie Park, securing a 3–3 draw against Rangers. Dundee struggled during the first 10 years of their existence. Their best league position was fifth which they achieved in seasons 1895–96 and 1896–97. They also reached the semi-finals of the Scottish Cup in 1894–95 and 1897–98, losing to Renton and Kilmarnock respectively. On 26 October 1895 Dundee lost a league game by a club record score of 0–11 to Celtic in Glasgow. On 1 January 1894, Dundee defeated Newton Heath (the future Manchester United) 2–1 at their then Carolina Port ground. Carolina Port also hosted the first international football match held in Dundee on 21 March 1896 when Scotland defeated Wales 4–0. Dundee's goalkeeper Frank Barrett, midfielder Sandy Keillor and inside-forward Bill Thomson were all capped for Scotland during this early period of the club's history. Things began to improve for Dundee with the beginning of the new century. In 1899 they moved from Carolina Port to their present ground of Dens Park. In season 1902–03 they finished runners-up in the league championship to Hibernian (Dundee conceded only 12 goals, which remains the fewest by any British club in a full league season).

Dundee were also league runners-up in 1906–1907 and 1908–09, behind Celtic on both occasions, by just one point in 1908–09. In the ten seasons from 1902 to 1913 Dundee lost just 16 league games at Dens Park out of 154 played, and were unbeaten at home during season 1909–10. Although ultimate success eluded Dundee in the league the club achieved success in the Scottish Cup. In season 1909–10 Dundee won their first trophy, defeating Clyde in the Scottish Cup final. Dundee took three games to beat Hibernian in the semi-final and then the same number to defeat Clyde. The winning goal in the second replay was scored by John 'Sailor' Hunter. In season 1910–11, Dundee defeated Rangers 2–1 at Dens Park in the Scottish Cup quarter-final but lost to Hamilton in the semi-final. The beginning of the First World War and the call-up of many players for military duty drastically curtailed football in Britain from 1914, and in 1917 Dundee and Aberdeen were both asked to withdraw from the league due to increasing transport costs for the other league clubs. In 1919 league football recommenced and good home form once again propelled Dundee up the league. They finished fourth in seasons 1919–20, 1920–21 and 1921–22, and were unbeaten at home during season 1921–22. However, they could not make the breakthrough to win the league championship.

Dave Halliday had played on the left wing for his previous clubs – St Mirren and his hometown side Queen of the South. He went to Dundee in 1921, where Scotland internationalist Alec Troup played left wing. Dundee thus converted Halliday to centre forward with spectacular results; he finished as Scottish top scorer in the 1923–24 season with 38 goals from his 36 top division appearances. This remains the club record all-time league goalscoring record for a single season (later, Halliday top-scored in England's top division in 1928–29, to become the most recent of only two players to be outright top scorer in Scotland and England). With Halliday, Dundee reached the 1924–25 Scottish Cup final, en route eliminating the holders, the Airdrieonians side of Hughie Gallacher. Dundee led Celtic 1–0 at half time in the final before losing out to a last-minute Jimmy McGrory winner. Halliday top-scored for Dundee in that cup run. In end-of-season tours with Dundee, he scored doubles against each of Athletic Bilbao, Real Madrid CF, Valencia CF and FC Barcelona. He scored 103 goals in 147 league and cup appearances for the Dee. He then moved south to set scoring records in England, where other teams profited from Dundee's decision to convert Halliday to centre-forward.

=== Mid-20th century ===
Chart of yearly table positions of Dundee in the Scottish League

The post-Second World War period was a golden era for Dundee Football Club. Having been relegated on the eve of war, the Dark Blues started in 1946 in the first official season in the second tier but within five years they were runners-up in the Scottish League Championship and won their first trophy in 41 years.

Back-to-back 'B' Division titles earned George Anderson's Dundee promotion in 1947, and just two years later they were within a whisker of becoming champions of Scotland. Dundee set a British football record in 1947 when they won 10–0 in back-to-back league games v Alloa Athletic (a) on 8 March and Dunfermline Athletic (h) on 22 March.

Silverware was not far away; after spending a world record transfer fee of £23,500 on Billy Steel (much to the chagrin of some supporters of the club – who resented the aspect of finance in football, and instead wished for 'homegrown' talent), they won the Scottish League Cup in 1951 in one of the most exciting finals Hampden has ever seen.

Twelve months later the team were back at Hampden to become the first side to retain the League Cup, and in between these two victories appeared in the 1952 Scottish Cup Final. The Dark Blue side of the era included players such as Bill Brown, Tommy Gallacher, Doug Cowie, Alfie Boyd, Bobby Flavell and Billy Steel.

In the 1958–59 Scottish Cup Dundee suffered a shock 1–0 defeat to Highland League side Fraserburgh. This is widely regarded as Dundee's most embarrassing defeat in their history.

=== 1960s – Dundee's golden age ===
Bob Shankly (brother of Bill Shankly) was appointed manager in 1959. Dundee became champions of Scotland when they won the Division One league title in the 1961–1962 season. With players such as Bobby Cox, Bobby Wishart, Pat Liney, Alan Cousin, Andy Penman, Hugh Robertson, Alan Gilzean, Alex Hamilton, Bobby Seith, Gordon Smith and Ian Ure they clinched the title with a win against St Johnstone, which in turn relegated St Johnstone to the then Second Division. Gordon Smith earned the distinction of being the only player to win the Scottish football championship with three clubs (Hibs, Hearts and Dundee), none of them either half of the traditionally dominant Old Firm.

The following season, 1962–1963, Dundee reached the semi-finals of the European Cup beating 1. FC Köln, Sporting CP and R.S.C. Anderlecht. Dundee lost to AC Milan on aggregate in the semi-finals, though they won (and kept a clean sheet) against Milan in the home leg at Dens Park.

The Dee reached the Scottish Cup final again in the 1963–1964 competition. Shankly left Dundee in February 1965.

The next manager after Shankly was former player Bobby Ancell from the 1947 B Division Championship side. Ancell took Dundee to a 1967–68 League Cup final against the previous season's European Cup winners, Celtic. Ancell's team scored three times at Hampden Park in Glasgow but still lost 5–3.

In the predecessor to the UEFA Cup and Europa League, Dundee reached the semi-finals of the 1967–68 Inter-Cities Fairs Cup. Dundee eliminated opposition from the Netherlands, Belgium and Switzerland to meet Leeds United in the semi-final. After a 1–1 draw at Dens, a 1–0 second leg win took Leeds through.

=== Late 20th century ===
In 1973, under the management of David White and captaincy of Tommy Gemmell, the Scottish League Cup returned to Dens following a 1–0 win against Celtic.

In 1986, Dundee secured a 2–0 victory over Hearts at Dens Park on the final day of the season to deny the Edinburgh club their first league title in 26 years. Hearts had managed to stay unbeaten in the league since 28 September 1985, and simply had to continue this run for one more game to finish top of the table ahead of their closest challengers Celtic; however, two late goals from substitute Albert Kidd, coupled with Celtic's 5–0 victory at St Mirren, ensured that the league championship went to Glasgow.

=== 21st century ===
In 2000 the club hit the headlines when it signed Argentine international Claudio Caniggia, who later signed for Rangers. Caniggia was only one of many foreign signings in the Dundee side in the early 2000s, which also included former Newcastle United player Temur Ketsbaia. The signing of such high-profile players, along with many others, led Dundee to a Scottish Cup final and two top-six finishes. This was achieved firstly under the managership of Ivano Bonetti (who also made a short but notable playing contribution, linking up well with Caniggia) and then under Jim Duffy. Attendances were still short of the hoped-for numbers, and with spending significantly outweighing income, Dundee was soon forced into administration.

Before Dundee entered financial trouble, the team knocked out Glasgow side Partick Thistle 2–0 away from home in the third round of the Scottish Cup in 2003. The fourth round saw Dundee knock out Aberdeen 2–0 at Dens Park. Dundee continued their march towards Hampden Park with a 1–1 draw away and a 4–1 extra time victory over Falkirk at Dens booked their place in the semi-finals playing Inverness CT at Hampden Park. A goal by Georgi Nemsadze secured a 1–0 victory and a place in the Final against Rangers. In the final Barry Smith hit the post for Dundee but Lorenzo Amoruso scored to bring Dundee's cup run to an end.

That year, due to the club's failure to sell on players as anticipated, insufficient income was raised to fund the large wage bill under owners Peter and James Marr, resulting in a £23m debt which meant they were forced to go into administration with many players such as Fabian Caballero, Craig Burley and Georgian captain Georgi Nemsadze leaving in 2005. Despite this huge debt, Dundee survived by selling their stadium in 2003. But the club was then relegated to the second tier of the Scottish leagues, where they remained until July 2012. In mid-2006, financial restructuring saw the club become debt-free.

In 2007, James and Peter Marr severed some of their ties with Dundee, stepping down as chairman and Chief Executive respectively, when their company P&J Taverns was forced into administration. Bob Brannan and Dave MacKinnon took the Marrs' place.

In 2008, after a poor run in the league, manager Alex Rae was sacked, with former manager Jocky Scott taking over for his third stint with the club.

Logo used from 1987–2008

Logo used for 2024–25 season

In the 2009–10 season Dundee director Calum Melville was in trouble for claiming he was going to offer rivals Dundee United £500,000 for ex-Dundee midfielder Scott Robertson. Dundee won the Challenge Cup Final when they beat Inverness Caledonian Thistle 3–2.

In March 2010, Scott was sacked as manager after a 3–0 defeat by Airdrie United. He was replaced by Gordon Chisholm, with Billy Dodds as his assistant.

In September 2010, Dundee were again on the brink of going into administration due to a £365,000 unpaid tax bill. During negotiations with HM Revenue and Customs, the club's offer to pay £100,000 immediately was rejected. On 14 September, the club went into administration. As punishment for entering administration the Scottish Football League docked Dundee 25 points on 1 November 2010. At the time the punishment was imposed, this left Dundee bottom of the First Division table with −11 points, 20 points behind the second-bottom team. On 10 December 2010 the Dark Blues Business Trust was set up by former Dundee owner Peter Marr and former director Steve Martin to help the club recover from their financial situation. On 17 December 2010 Dundee's appeal against the points deduction was rejected. Dundee went on a record 23 match undefeated streak in the first division.

On 12 May 2011, Dundee FC exited administration. The club's supporters' trust, Dundee FC Supporters' Society Ltd., became the majority shareholder, and Steve Martin of the DFC Business Trust joined the board of directors along with five of the Society Fans board.

On 6 November 2011, Harry MacLean resigned from his position as Chief Executive. MacLean, who had played a key role in saving the club during administration, accepted an invitation to re-join the club in a non-executive role before departing his position as Chief Executive. His resignation was followed just eleven days later by Stuart Murphy's decision to step down as club chairman and director of the club which was effective immediately. On 27 December 2011, Harry MacLean resigned from his non-executive role causing questions to arise about the stability of the boardroom. Shortly after the gap left by MacLean was filled by Scot Gardiner.

On 16 July 2012, Dundee were invited to join the Scottish Premier League to replace Rangers after their financial crisis and subsequent admittance to the fourth tier of Scottish football.

Since the second period of administration, Dundee, along with their Supporters' Society, implemented regular KPI targets. These targets were set to ensure, in some part, that the failures that led to administration and indeed, several decades of financial turmoil could not be repeated. Dundee were left after the second administration with only footballing debt and no borrowing capability. Since exiting administration, the club has focused on honouring the footballing debt, whilst keeping lower football wages and stadium bills, according to the income generated. The debt post-admin was unexpectedly still over £200,000 which had to be quickly worked into the board's already stretched budgets.

After an unsuccessful season in the Premier League, Dundee were again relegated after finishing bottom, despite vastly improved form after John Brown replaced Barry Smith as manager toward the end of the season. The following season (2013–14), Dundee took part in the Scottish Championship (formerly the First Division) after reforms were made to the Scottish League system.

=== FPS ownership ===
Throughout the summer leading up to the start of the 2013–14 season talks were held regarding a possible Texan based takeover with investments to be made of up to £650,000. The takeover was completed and former Director Bill Colvin was appointed as chairman to oversee this new board of which main investor Tim Keyes of Keyes Capital, Austin, Texas, appointed John Nelms to look after his interests. The 2013–14 season proved to be one to remember with Dundee clinching the title and promotion to the top tier on the last day of the season with a 2–1 win over Dumbarton. After a heavy defeat to Falkirk and a draw against Alloa, manager John Brown was replaced by Paul Hartley. A 3–0 win at Alloa for The Dark Blues and a 4–1 loss to Dumbarton for Hamilton Academical meant that Dundee were in the driving seat when it came to the finale. Dens Park was sold out for the game against Dumbarton when Christian Nadé headed in the opening goal. Soon after, Peter MacDonald scored the second goal. The away side pulled a goal back in the second half and Hamilton Academical managed to close the goal difference with a 10–2 victory over Greenock Morton. But Dundee got the three points, and clinched promotion to the Scottish Premiership.

Paul Hartley was quick in the transfer window for the following season, bringing in no fewer than twelve new players, to rebuild the squad for top-flight football, having already signed Greg Stewart on a pre-contract from Cowdenbeath and Philip Roberts who joined before the end of May. Released Hibernian players James McPake and Kevin Thomson were next to join, along with Alloa goalkeeper Scott Bain. Thomson was made captain after signing. Simon Ferry, released from Portsmouth, then returned to his hometown to play for Dundee. Paul McGowan and Paul McGinn arrived from St Mirren and Dumbarton, then attacking midfielder Gary Harkins signed for his third spell at the club on the last day of June, after also being released from St Mirren. A number of first team players departed, namely Christian Nadé and Ryan Conroy, who both went on to join Raith Rovers, Gavin Rae who retired from playing and player-coach Matt Lockwood.

On the opening day of the 2014–2015 season, Dundee recorded a 1–1 draw against Kilmarnock at home, Gary Harkins put Dundee ahead from the spot after Kilmarnock conceded a penalty, with Craig Slater equalising for the visitors from a well struck free-kick on the edge of the Dundee area. Dundee won their first game of the 2014–2015 season on 23 August with a 1–0 win over St Mirren away from home, a 79th-minute goal from Peter MacDonald securing the win, making them unbeaten in their first four league games of the season. Dundee also started the League Cup well with two 4–0 wins on the bounce over Peterhead and Raith Rovers.

Dundee managed to gain a top six place by mid-April thus securing their position in the Premiership for 2015–16 campaign. They secured the place for definite after Kilmarnock were defeated 2–1 by Aberdeen on 12 April and a derby victory on 8 April in a 3–1 win at home to Dundee United.

At the end of the 2014–15 season, in June, Dundee chairman Bill Colvin stepped down as chairman and sold his share in Dundee to then director Tim Keyes who became the new chairman of the club.

Dundee finished eighth in the 2015–16 Scottish Premiership, notably relegating rivals Dundee United at Dens Park.

Dundee were relegated to the Scottish Championship at the end of the 2018–2019 season. Manager Jim McIntyre and assistant manager Jimmy Boyle were sacked on 12 May. After playing the role of interim manager in Dundee's final home game, former player James McPake was hired as manager on a permanent basis, with Jimmy Nicholl, then current assistant manager of Northern Ireland, brought in as assistant manager. The club finished the season (prematurely ended due to the COVID-19 pandemic) in third place, and the following season finished as runners-up. In the Premiership play-offs, Dundee defeated Raith Rovers and Premiership side Kilmarnock to earn promotion back into the top flight after two seasons.

After an underwhelming return to the Premiership which again resulted in relegation, Dundee finished the 2022–23 Scottish Championship as champions under one-season manager Gary Bowyer. In January 2024, Dundee announced a strategic partnership with ALK Capital, the majority owners of English club Burnley with the focus of a pathway for players to develop for both sides. In November of the same year, Dundee struck up another strategic partnership with Mexican club Monterrey. Dundee formed another key partnership in August 2025 when they announced a cooperation agreement with local club Brechin City.

== Stadium ==
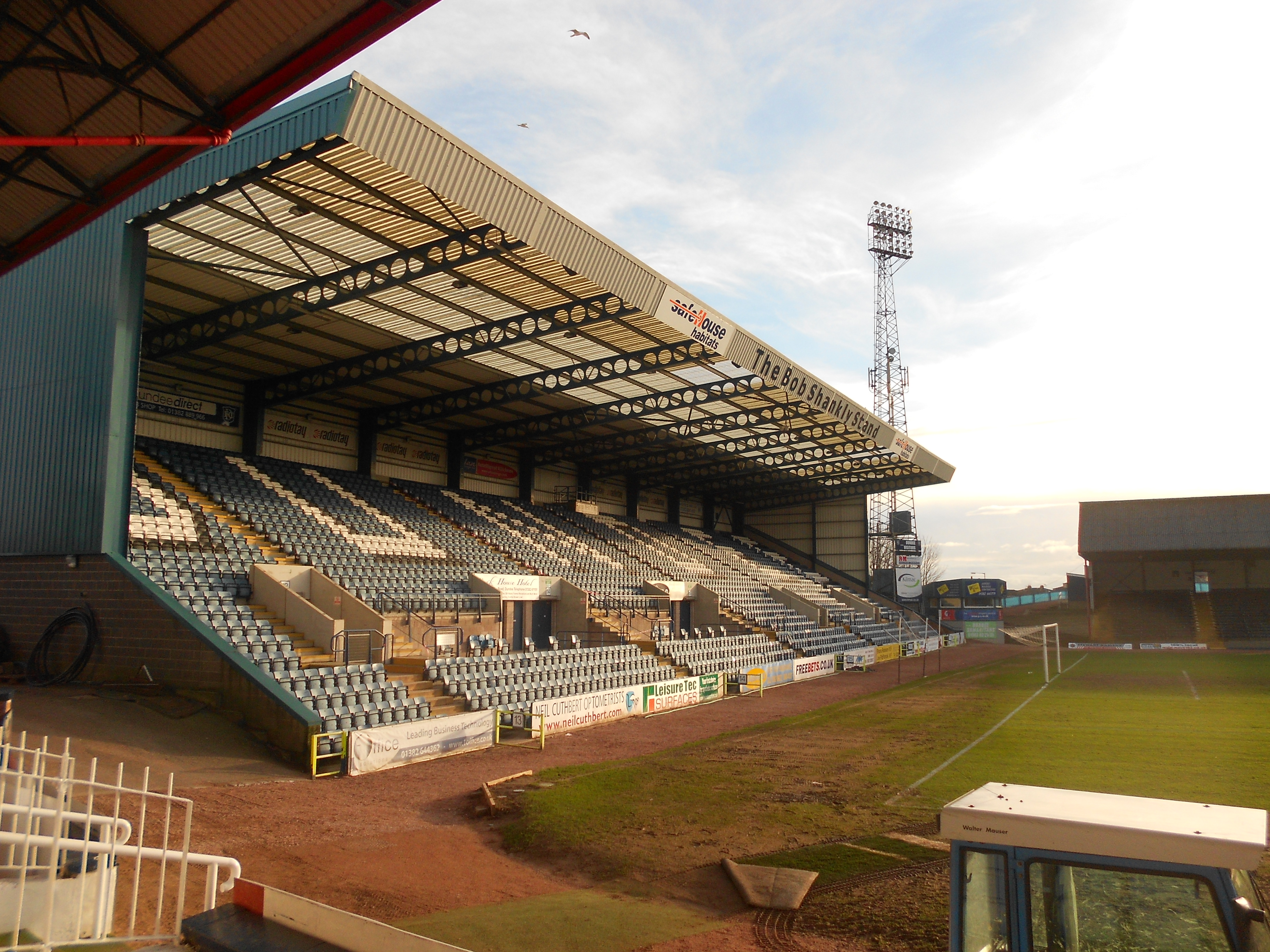
The Bob Shankly Stand at Dens Park

Since 1899, Dundee have played their home matches at Dens Park which has a capacity of 11,775. Uniquely, the stadium shares part of the same road (Sandeman Street) as Tannadice Park, which is the home of city rivals Dundee United.

In 2002, plans were drawn up for a new stadium to be built in the city as part of Scotland's joint bid to host the 2008 European Football Championship. This stadium would have been shared by Dundee and near-neighbours Dundee United, which would have required the two to leave their historic grounds at Dens Park and Tannadice Stadium respectively. However, when Austria and Switzerland were selected to co-host the event, the plans were shelved for the immediate future.

In May 2009, it was reported that the stadium is owned by local businessman John Bennett who, despite having invested heavily in Dundee, had rejoined the Dundee United board, where he had previously been a director until September 2008.

In October 2014, Dundee Supporter's Society announced they had put forward plans to then club chairman, Bill Colvin, which would allow the club to buy back the stadium from current owner John Bennett. They also expressed this was not a plan to enable the Supporter's Society to own the Stadium but for the club themselves, and that they will "simply administer the scheme".

In April 2015, Colvin announced that negotiations were taking place to buy back the Stadium from current owner John Bennett and his company Sandeman Holdings.

In August 2016, club owners Tim Keyes and John Nelms were reported to have bought land in the Camperdown area of Dundee, next to the city's Ice Arena. It was then made clear in February 2017 that the plan for this land was to develop a new stadium for the club due to the increasing maintenance costs of Dens Park, although plans for a move were described by Nelms as being "early doors" in a video interview published on the club's website.

In May 2018, the stadium was renamed Kilmac Stadium at Dens Park for sponsorship reasons for the next two seasons. In October 2020, the club announced that Kilmac had extended its sponsorship for another year, again renaming the stadium to Kilmac Stadium. At the start of the 2023–24 season, the stadium sponsor changed to The Scot Foam Stadium.

In October 2023, Keyes and Nelms announced that their company, Dark Blue Property Holdings, had completed the purchase of Dens Park from John Bennett as part of the process of moving the club from Dens to the proposed new stadium at Camperdown.

In February 2024, Dark Blue Property Holdings Ltd announced that planning permission in principle documentation had been submitted to the council.

== Club staff ==
=== Corporate board ===
Position	Name
Chairman	Tim Keyes
Managing director	John Nelms
Company secretary	Lindsay Darroch
Finance director	Alasdair McGill
Director	Bob Hynd

=== Management and staff ===
Position	Name
Head coach	Steven Pressley
Assistant head coach	Barry Nicholson
First team coach	Scott Paterson
Goalkeeping coach	Glen Johnson
Technical director	Gordon Strachan
Technical manager	David Longwell
First team performance and opposition analyst	Neil Paylor
First team performance and opposition analyst	Luke Ellison
First team physiotherapist	Cameron Ross
First team physiotherapist	David Smith
Strength and conditioning coach	Scott Teister
Sports scientist	Alex Webb
Head of recruitment	Gary Piggott
Recruitment analyst	Billy Kirkwood
Head of football operations	Tommy Young
Head of academy	Stephen Wright
Head of football development	Scott Robertson
Performance and development coach	Greig McNaughton
Academy coach	Kevin Garrick
Academy director	Jamie McBrearty
Club secretary	Eric Drysdale
Head of club media	Joe Anderson
Head groundsman	Paul Murray

== Players ==
=== First-team squad ===
As of 10 October 2026

Note: Flags indicate national team as defined under FIFA eligibility rules; some limited exceptions apply. Players may hold more than one non-FIFA nationality.

No.	Pos.	Nation	Player
1	GK	CAN	Owen Goodman (on loan from Crystal Palace)
2	DF	ENG	Brad Halliday
3	DF	ENG	Idris Odutayo
4	DF	WAL	Ryan Astley
5	DF	WAL	Owen Bevan
6	DF	USA	Matai Akinmboni (on loan from Bournemouth)
7	MF	ENG	Drey Wright
8	MF	ENG	Ryan Finnigan
9	FW	SCO	Bobby Wales (on loan from Swansea City)
10	MF	SCO	Finlay Robertson
11	FW	ENG	Ashley Hay
12	DF	ENG	Imari Samuels
13	GK	IRL	Kieran O'Hara

No.	Pos.	Nation	Player
14	MF	SCO	Alan Forrest
15	FW	SCO	Simon Murray (captain)
17	MF	SLO	Žan Bešir
18	MF	SCO	Charlie Reilly
19	FW	ENG	Joe Westley
21	FW	SUI	Bradley Fink (on loan from Wycombe Wanderers)
26	DF	WAL	Joe Wright
27	FW	SCO	Joe Bevan
28	MF	WAL	Callum Jones
30	GK	SCO	Harrison Sharp
48	MF	SCO	Ethan Hamilton
77	MF	ENG	Alfie Harrison

=== On loan ===
Note: Flags indicate national team as defined under FIFA eligibility rules; some limited exceptions apply. Players may hold more than one non-FIFA nationality.

No.	Pos.	Nation	Player
45	DF	SCO	Cole Perrie (on loan at Cowdenbeath)
49	FW	SCO	Luca Perrie (co-operation loan with Forfar Athletic)
52	DF	SCO	Charley Oosenbrugh (co-operation loan with Montrose)

No.	Pos.	Nation	Player
58	MF	SCO	Ethan Crombie (co-operation loan with Forfar Athletic)
—	DF	NIR	Aaron Donnelly (on loan at Dunfermline Athletic)

=== Development squad ===
Note: Flags indicate national team as defined under FIFA eligibility rules; some limited exceptions apply. Players may hold more than one non-FIFA nationality.

No.	Pos.	Nation	Player
41	GK	SCO	Ruaridh Lynch
47	DF	SCO	Ashton Leiper
50	FW	SCO	Christopher Rooney
53	MF	SCO	Leo Howett
54	FW	SCO	Adam Anderson
55	MF	SCO	Rory Hughes
57	MF	SCO	Travis Boyd
59	FW	SCO	Jack Barr
60	MF	SCO	Ryan Bland
—	GK	SCO	Johnny Watson
—	DF	SCO	Ethan Flynn

No.	Pos.	Nation	Player
—	DF	SCO	Logan Myles
—	DF	SCO	Lewis Webster
—	DF	SCO	Jamie Whitton
—	MF	SCO	Rory Cargill
—	MF	SCO	Isaac Dunn
—	MF	SCO	Caeden Jack
—	MF	SCO	Connor McLaren
—	MF	SCO	Sonny Paterson
—	MF	SCO	Lough Simpson
—	MF	SCO	Lewis Wiseman
—	FW	SCO	Leo Boath

== International players ==
Former and current players who have played at full international level while with the club, ordered by nationality and year of their debut:

Australia

- Mark Robertson (2001)

Canada

- Chris Pozniak (2008)
- Marcus Haber (2016)
- Owen Goodman (2026)

China

- Fan Zhiyi (2001)

Denmark

- Morten Wieghorst (1992)

Finland

- Glen Kamara (2017)
- Benjamin Källman (2018)

(Georgia (country)) Georgia

- Georgi Nemsadze (2000)
- Temur Ketsbaia (2001)
- Zurab Khizanishvili (2001)

Guadeloupe

- Mickaël Antoine-Curier (2008)

Northern Ireland

- Sam Irving (1923)
- Billy Campbell (1967)
- Niall McGinn (2022)
- Aaron Donnelly (2024)

Poland

- Dariusz Adamczuk (1993)
- Piotr Czachowski (1994)

Scotland

- Sandy Keillor (1894)
- William Longair (1894)
- Francis Barrett (1894)
- William Sawers (1895)
- Billy Thomson (1896)
- Bob Kelso (1896)
- Peter Robertson (1903)
- Sandy MacFarlane (1904)
- Jimmy Sharp (1904)
- Jack Fraser (1907)
- Willie Muir (1907)
- John Hunter (1907)
- George Chaplin (1908)
- Robert Hamilton (1911)
- Tom Kelso (1914)
- David Thomson (1920)
- Alex Troup (1920)
- John Gilmour (1930)
- Colin McNab (1931)
- James Robertson (1931)
- Doug Cowie (1945)
- Billy Steel (1952)
- Bill Brown (1958)
- Ian Ure (1962)
- Alex Hamilton (1962)
- Hugh Robertson (1962)
- Alan Gilzean (1964)
- Charlie Cooke (1965)
- Andy Penman (1966)
- George McLean (1968)
- Jocky Scott (1971)
- Thomson Allan (1974)
- Bobby Robinson (1974)
- Bobby Connor (1986)
- Gavin Rae (2001)
- Lee Wilkie (2002)
- Scott Bain (2018)

Sierra Leone

- Amadou Bakayoko (2023)

Slovakia

- Dušan Vrťo (1994)

Trinidad and Tobago

- Brent Sancho (2003)
- Kelvin Jack (2004)

Venezuela

- Jonay Hernández (2002)

== Hall of Fame ==
=== Legends Award ===
- Alan Gilzean (2009)
- Barry Smith (2009)
- Billy Steel (2009)
- Bobby Cox (2009)
- Doug Cowie (2009)
- Jocky Scott (2009)
- Alex Hamilton (2010)
- Gordon Wallace (2010)
- Jim Duffy (2010)
- Alan Cousin (2011)
- Andy Penman (2011)
- Ian Ure (2011)
- Pat Liney (2011)
- Tommy Coyne (2011)
- Bobby Seith (2012)
- Bobby Wishart (2012)
- Gordon Smith (2012)
- Hugh Robertson (2012)
- Alf Boyd (2013)
- Bobby Glennie (2013)
- Bobby Wilson (2013)
- John Duncan (2015)
- Bill Brown (2015)
- Ally Donaldson (2016)
- Billy Pirie (2016)
- Neil McCann (2016)
- Thomson Allan (2017)
- Keith Wright (2017)
- Eric Sinclair (2018)
- Cammy Fraser (2018)
- Tosh McKinlay (2019)
- George Stewart (2019)
- Bobby Ford (2024)

=== Heritage Award ===
- William 'Plum' Longair (2009)
- Bob Shankly (2010)
- Tommy Gallacher (2011)
- George Anderson (2013)
- Sandy MacFarlane (2015)
- John 'Sailor' Hunter (2016)
- Alec Troup (2017)
- David 'Napper' Thomson (2018)
- Albert Juliussen (2019)
- Jock Gilmour (2024)

=== Golden Era Award ===
- Jimmy Toner (2016)
- Alex Stuart (2017)
- Bobby Flavell (2018)
- Bert Slater (2024)

=== International Award ===
- Claudio Caniggia (2009)
- Georgi Nemsadze (2010)
- Jack Cowan (2013)
- Julián Speroni (2015)
- Dariusz Adamczuk (2019)
- Morten Wieghorst (2019)

=== Special Recognition Award ===
- Bobby Geddes (2016)
- Eric Ferguson (2024)
- Jim Thomson (2024)

=== Modern Moment Award ===
- James Grady's goal against Dundee United at Tannadice in 1998–1999 (2015)

=== Modern Heroes Award ===
- Rab Douglas (2017)
- Gavin Rae (2018)
- Gary Harkins (2024)

Note: Year is year inducted into Hall of Fame

== Managerial history ==
Name	Period
(Scotland) Willie Wallace	1899–1919
(Scotland) Sandy MacFarlane	1919–1925
(Scotland) Alec McNair	1925–1927
(Scotland) Jimmy Bissett	1927–1933
(Northern Ireland) Billy McCandless	1933–1937
(Scotland) Andy Cunningham	1937–1940
(England) George Anderson	1944–1954
(Scotland) Willie Thornton	1954–1959
(Scotland) Bob Shankly	1959–1965
(Scotland) Bobby Ancell	1965–1968

Name	Period
(Scotland) John Prentice	1968–1972
(Scotland) David White	1972–1977
(Scotland) Tommy Gemmell	1977–1980
(Scotland) Don Mackay	1980–1984
(Scotland) Archie Knox	1984–1986
(Scotland) Jocky Scott	1986–1988
(Scotland) Jocky Scott	1998–2000
(Scotland) Jocky Scott	2008–2010
(Scotland) Dave Smith	1988–1989
(Scotland) Gordon Wallace	1989–1991

Name	Period
(Scotland) Iain Munro	1991–1992
(England) Simon Stainrod	1992–1993
(Scotland) Jim Duffy	1993–1996
(Scotland) Jim Duffy	2002–2005
(Scotland) John McCormack	1997–1998
(Italy) Ivano Bonetti	2000–2002
(Republic of Ireland) Alan Kernaghan	2005–2006
(Scotland) Alex Rae	2006–2008
(Scotland) Gordon Chisholm	2010
(Scotland) Barry Smith	2010–2013

Name	Period
(Scotland) John Brown	2013–2014
(Scotland) Paul Hartley	2014–2017
(Scotland) Neil McCann	2017–2018
(Scotland) Jim McIntyre	2018–2019
(Northern Ireland) James McPake	2019–2022
(Scotland) Mark McGhee	2022
(England) Gary Bowyer	2022–2023
(Scotland) Tony Docherty	2023–2025
(Scotland) Steven Pressley	2025–

== Player and young player of the year awards ==
=== Andrew De Vries Player of the Year ===
- Neil McCann (1993–94)
- George Shaw (1994–95)
- George Shaw (1995–96)
- Barry Smith (1996–97)
- Rab Douglas (1997–98)
- Dariusz Adamczuk (1998–99)
- Willie Falconer (1999–00)
- Claudio Caniggia (2000–01)
- Temur Ketsbaia (2001–02)
- Lee Wilkie (2002–03)
- Nacho Novo (2003–04)
- Steve Lovell (2004–05)
- Bobby Mann (2005–06)
- Kevin McDonald (2006–07)
- Scott Robertson (2007–08)
- Rab Douglas (2008–09)
- Jim Lauchlan (2009–10)
- Rab Douglas (2010–11)
- Gary Irvine (2011–12)
- Jim McAlister (2012–13)
- Kyle Letheren (2013–14)
- Scott Bain (2014–15)
- Kane Hemmings (2015–16)
- Cammy Kerr (2016–17)
- Glen Kamara (2017–18)
- Nathan Ralph (2018–19)
- Paul McGowan (2019–20)
- Lee Ashcroft (2020–21)
- Ryan Sweeney (2021–22)
- Lyall Cameron (2022–23)
- Luke McCowan (2023–24)
- Simon Murray (2024–25)
- Ethan Hamilton (2025–26)

=== Isobel Sneddon Young Player of the Year ===
- Cammy Kerr (2013–14)
- Craig Wighton (2014–15)
- Cammy Kerr (2015–16)
- Cammy Kerr (2016–17)
- Kerr Waddell (2017–18)
- Callum Moore (2018–19)
- Finlay Robertson (2019–20)
- Max Anderson (2020–21)
- Max Anderson (2021–22)
- Lyall Cameron (2022–23)
- Lyall Cameron (2023–24)
- Oluwaseun Adewumi (2024–25)
- Luke Graham (2025–26)

=== Players' Player of the Year ===
- Nathan Ralph (2018–19)
- Jordan McGhee (2019–20)
- Lee Ashcroft (2020–21)
- Ryan Sweeney (2021–22)
- Lyall Cameron (2022–23)
- Luke McCowan (2023–24)
- Simon Murray (2024–25)
- Luke Graham (2025–26)

== Rivalries ==
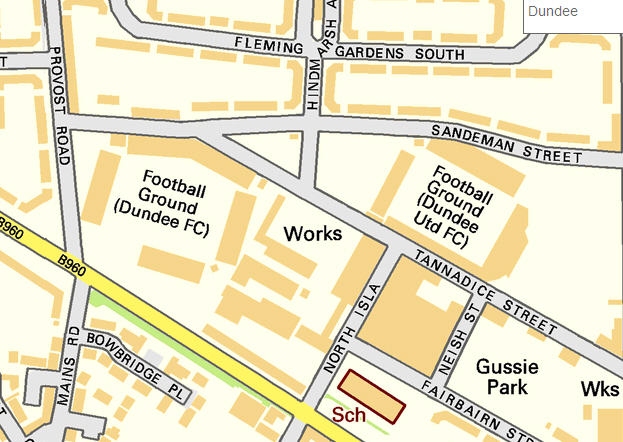
Map showing the proximity of Dundee FC's stadium Dens Park (left) and Dundee United FC's stadium Tannadice Park (right)

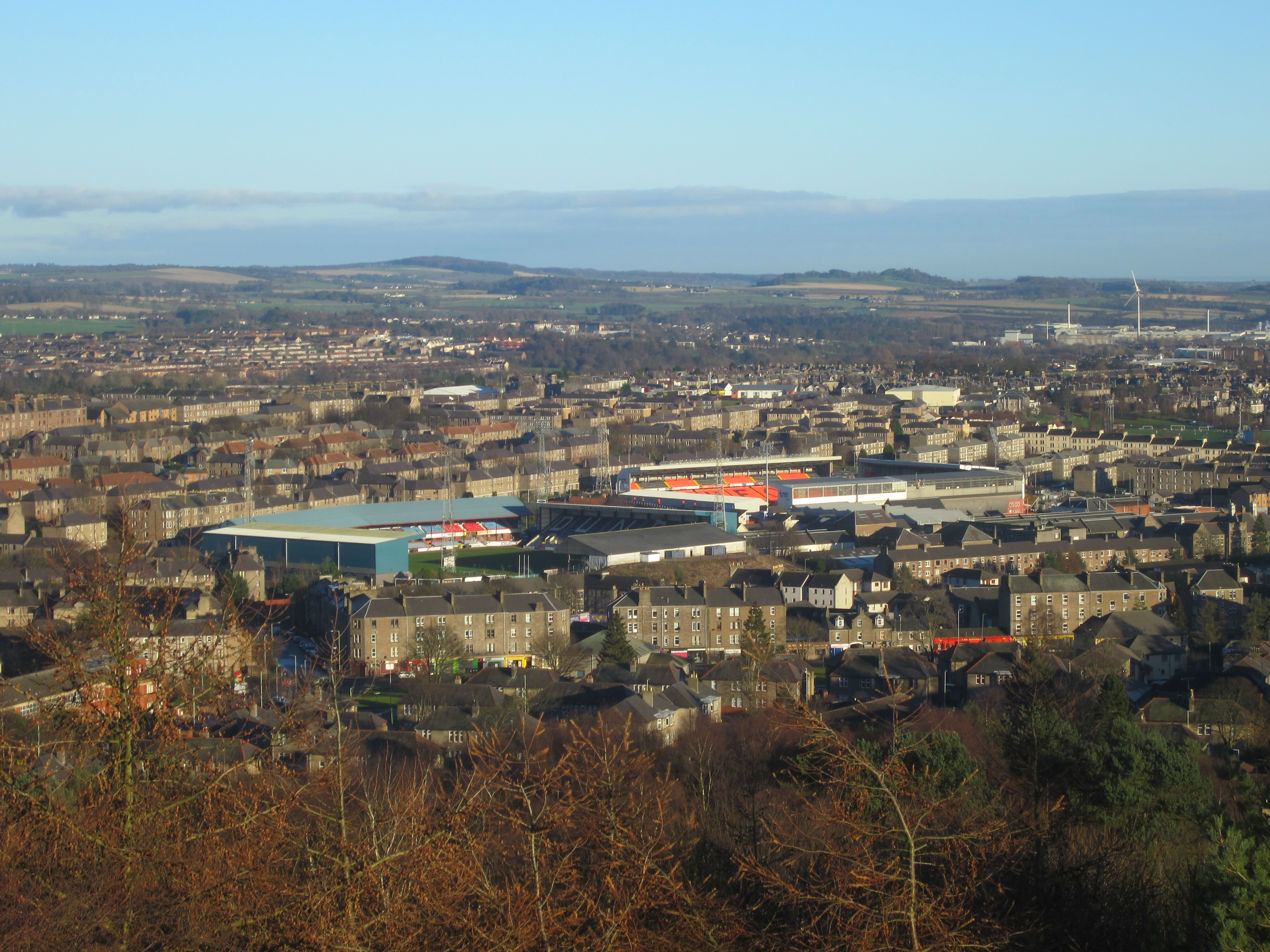
Dundee's Dens Park and United's Tannadice Park pictured from the Dundee Law, 2014.

Dundee's traditional rivals are Dundee United, with whom they compete in the Dundee derby. The rivalry is unique, as the two teams' stadiums are located within 100 yards of each other, making them the two closest League grounds in Britain. The close proximity of the two teams also fuels the intensity of the rivalry. This intensity makes it one of the most exciting and notable derbies in Scotland. While it is far friendlier than other Scottish derbies such as the Old Firm, both sets of fans regard the fixture to be of high importance, with derby results throughout the season being defining points in each teams' seasons.

Dundee traditionally dominated the fixture in its first few decades, but the momentum shifted in the 1970s, with United taking a foothold in the fixture. The history of late has been defined by the inability of both teams to consistently stay in the same division, with Dundee a division below United for quite a few seasons while dealing with the after-effects of multiple administrations. Dundee eventually returned to the Scottish Premiership in 2014, and in 2016 it was a Dundee derby victory over United that confirmed the latter's own relegation. After a few years of Dundee being a league above United, the two were eventually reunited again in the Scottish Championship in 2019 following Dundee's relegation.

Dundee and United also share a mutual rivalry with St Johnstone, due to the close proximity between Dundee and Perth, known as the Tayside derby. Dundee fans however treat the tie far less seriously than the Dundee derby and in comparison to their Perth counterparts, though the fixture took prominence after United's relegation in 2016. The most notable fixture between the two occurred in 1962, where Dundee defeated St Johnstone 0–3 at the latter's former ground, Muirton Park. This result both confirmed Dundee as league champions for the first and to date only time in their history, and confirmed St Johnstone's relegation from the First Division.

== Records ==
- Highest attendance: 136,495 fans attended the 1952 Scottish Cup final between Dundee and Motherwell. This is also a record for a club match in Scotland not featuring either of the Old Firm.
- Highest home attendance: 43,024 vs Rangers, 7 February 1953, Scottish Cup second Round
- Highest average home attendance: 24,532, 1948–1949 (15 games)
- Biggest league win: 10–0 vs. Alloa Athletic and Dunfermline Athletic, 1947
- Biggest league loss: 11–0 vs. Celtic, 1895
- Most capped player: Alex Hamilton, 24, Scotland
- Most league appearances: Bill Marsh, 386, 1924–1937
- Most appearances: Doug Cowie, 445, 1945–1961
- Most league goals: Alan Gilzean, 113
- Most goals in a match: Albert Juliussen, 7 vs Dunfermline, 22 March 1947
- Most goals in two consecutive matches: Albert Juliussen, 13 (6 vs Alloa, 6/3/47, 7 vs Dunfermline, 22/3/47)
- Most goals in consecutive matches: Johnny Bell, 9 goals in 9 matches, 1920–1921
- Most league goals in a season: Dave Halliday, 38, 1923–1924
- Most league and cup goals in a season: Alan Gilzean, 52, 1963–1964
- Most games unbeaten: 23 (2 October 2010 – 26 March 2011)
- Highest transfer fee paid: £600,000, Fabián Caballero from Club Sol de América
- Highest transfer fee received: £2,000,000 Luke Graham to Stoke City
- Oldest player: Bobby Geddes, 49 against Raith Rovers, 21 April 2010
- Youngest player: Andy Penman, 15 years 352 days against Hearts, 7 February 1959
- Youngest goalscorer: Craig Wighton, 16 years 105 days against Raith Rovers, 9 November 2013

== Honours ==
=== League ===
- Scottish Premiership:
  - Winners (1): 1961–1962
  - Runners-up (4): 1902–1903, 1906–1907, 1908–1909, 1948–1949
- Scottish Championship:
  - Winners (6): 1946–1947, 1978–1979, 1991–1992, 1997–1998, 2013–2014, 2022–2023
  - Runners-up (5): 1980–1981, 2007–2008, 2009–2010, 2011–2012, 2020–2021

=== Domestic cups ===
- Scottish Cup:
  - Winners (1): 1909–1910
  - Runners-up (4): 1924–1925, 1951–1952, 1963–1964, 2002–2003
- Scottish League Cup:
  - Winners (3): 1951–1952, 1952–1953, 1973–1974
  - Runners-up (3): 1967–1968, 1980–1981, 1995–1996
- Scottish Challenge Cup:
  - Winners (2): 1990–1991, 2009–2010
  - Runners-up (1): 1994–1995

=== Europe ===
- European Cup:
  - Semi-finalists (1): 1962–1963
- Inter-Cities Fairs Cup:
  - Semi-finalists (1): 1967–1968

=== Other ===
- Forfarshire Cup:
  - Winners (28): 28 times
- Scottish Youth Cup:
  - Runners-up (3): 1987–1988, 1995–1996, 1998–1999
- Evening Telegraph Challenge Cup:
  - Winners (1): 2006
- Tennent's Sixes:
  - Winners (1): 1988
  - Finalists (1): 1984

== Kit sponsors and manufacturers ==
Year	Kit manufacturer	Primary shirt sponsor	Secondary shirt sponsor	Shorts Sponsor
1976–1980	Admiral Sportswear	none	none	none
1980–1987	Umbro	none	none	none
1987–1989	Matchwinner	Novafone Cellular	none	none
1989–1990	Matchwinner	Novafone	none	none
1990–1992	Matchwinner	Kelly's Copiers	none	none
1992–1993	Asics	none	none	none
1993–1994	Asics	Sports Division	none	none
1994–1996	Matchwinner	Auto Windscreens	none	none
1996–1998	Avec	Firkin Brewery	none	none
1998–1999	Avec	Scottish Hydro Electric	none	none
1999–2002	Xara	Ceramic Tile Warehouse	none	none
2002–2003	360	Jsearch.co.uk	none	none
2003–2005	Xara	Magners	none	none
2005–2006	Xara	The Forfar Roof Truss Company	none	none
2006–2008	Bukta	Signatures4U	none	none
2008–2009	Bukta	Bukta	Scott Fyffe Motors	none
2009–2010	Bukta	Viga	Scott Fyffe Motors	none
2010–2011	Puma	Kilmac Energy	Scott Fyffe Motors	Energie Group
2011–2013	Puma	Kilmac Energy	Scott Fyffe Motors	none
2014–2015	Puma	Hangar Records	Scott Fyffe Motors	Crown Engineering
2015–2016	Puma	Kilmac Energy	Scott Fyffe Motors	Crown Engineering
2016–2019	Puma	McEwan Fraser Legal	Scott Fyffe Motors	Crown Engineering
2019–2020	Macron	Switch Gas & Electric	MKM Building Supplies & Metro Motors	Crown Engineering
2020–2024	Macron	Crown Engineering	MKM Building Supplies & Metro Motors	Kilmac Energy
2024–	Macron	Crown Engineering	MKM Building Supplies & Metro Motors	DrainBlitz
