= 1924–25 Dundee F.C. season =

Dundee
1924–25 season
- Manager: Sandy MacFarlane (until Feb. 1925)
- Stadium: Dens Park
- Division One: 8th
- Scottish Cup: Finalists
- Top goalscorer: League: Dave Halliday (19); All: Dave Halliday (24)
Home colours

The 1924–25 season was the thirtieth season in which Dundee competed at a Scottish national level, playing in Division One, where they would finish in 8th place. Dundee would also compete in the Scottish Cup, where they would make it all the way to the final for the second time in their history. Despite David McLean putting the Dee ahead at half-time, they would concede two late goals and be defeated in the final by Celtic.

== Scottish Division One ==
Statistics provided by Dee Archive.

Match day	Date	Opponent	H/A	Score	Dundee scorer(s)	Attendance
1	16 August	Celtic	H	0–0		22,000
2	23 August	Partick Thistle	A	1–1	Halliday	
3	30 August	Heart of Midlothian	H	6–0	Halliday (4), McLean (2)	17,000
4	6 September	St Mirren	A	1–2	Halliday	
5	13 September	Kilmarnock	H	3–1	Halliday, Nicholson (2)	
6	20 September	Motherwell	A	1–4	Thomson	
7	27 September	Queen's Park	H	2–4	Halliday (2)	
8	4 October	St Johnstone	A	2–1	Duncan (2)	
9	11 October	Greenock Morton	H	0–0		
10	18 October	Aberdeen	A	0–0		18,000
11	25 October	Hibernian	A	2–4	McDonald, Halliday	10,000
12	1 November	Third Lanark	H	1–2	Duncan	
13	8 November	Ayr United	A	0–1		
14	15 November	Cowdenbeath	H	1–1	Duncan	
15	22 November	Hamilton Academical	A	1–4	Irving	
16	29 November	Raith Rovers	H	2–0	Halliday, McDonald	
17	6 December	Rangers	H	0–0		20,000
18	13 December	Falkirk	A	2–1	Halliday, McLean	
19	20 December	Airdrieonians	H	3–2	Duncan, Thomson, Brown	
20	25 December	Third Lanark	A	0–3		
21	27 December	Greenock Morton	A	1–1	Hunter	
22	1 January	Aberdeen	H	2–0	Halliday, Duncan	13,000
23	3 January	Partick Thistle	H	0–2		
24	5 January	Raith Rovers	A	3–4	McDonald, McLean, Duncan	
25	10 January	Kilmarnock	A	1–4	Hunter	
26	17 January	Falkirk	H	1–0	Halliday	
27	31 January	Cowdenbeath	A	0–2		
28	10 February	Rangers	A	0–2		5,000
29	14 February	Hamilton Academical	H	2–0	Duncan, Halliday	
30	25 February	Ayr United	H	1–0	Halliday	
31	28 February	Celtic	A	0–4		8,000
32	10 March	Queen's Park	A	1–0	Gilmour	
33	14 March	Motherwell	H	1–0	W. Rankin	
34	28 March	St Johnstone	H	2–0	Halliday, Duncan	
35	4 April	Hibernian	H	3–0	McLean, Halliday (2)	13,000
36	15 April	St Mirren	H	0–2		
37	18 April	Heart of Midlothian	A	0–1		6,000
38	22 April	Airdrieonians	A	1–1	W. Rankin	

=== League table ===
Pos	Team	Pld	W	D	L	GF	GA	GD	Pts
6	St Mirren	38	18	5	15	66	63	+3	41
7	Partick Thistle	38	14	10	14	60	61	−1	38
8	Dundee	38	14	8	16	47	54	−7	36
9	Raith Rovers	38	14	8	16	53	61	−8	36
10	Heart of Midlothian	38	12	11	15	64	68	−4	35

== Scottish Cup ==
Statistics provided by Dee Archive.

Match day	Date	Opponent	H/A	Score	Dundee scorer(s)	Attendance
1st round	24 January	Johnstone	H	5–0	Halliday (3), J. Rankin, McLean	
2nd round	7 February	Lochgelly United	H	2–1	Duncan, W. Rankin	
3rd round	21 February	Airdrieonians	H	3–1	McLean, Duncan, Halliday	
Quarter-finals	7 March	Broxburn United	H	1–0	Halliday	
Semi-finals	21 March	Hamilton Academical	H	1–1	Duncan	
SF replay	24 March	Hamilton Academical	A	2–0	McLean, J. Rankin	
Final	11 April	Celtic	N	1–2	McLean	75,317

== Player statistics ==
Statistics provided by Dee Archive

No.	Pos	Nat	Player	Total		First Division		Scottish Cup	
No.	Pos	Nat	Player	Apps	Goals	Apps	Goals	Apps	Goals
	FW	(Scotland) SCO	John Barclay	2	0	2	0	0	0
	GK	(Scotland) SCO	Jock Britton	44	0	37	0	7	0
	DF	(Scotland) SCO	Finlay Brown	21	1	18	1	3	0
	MF	(Scotland) SCO	Hugh Coyle	4	0	4	0	0	0
	FW	(Scotland) SCO	Charlie Duncan	34	12	28	9	6	3
	FW	(Scotland) SCO	George Gibson	3	0	3	0	0	0
	DF	(Scotland) SCO	Jock Gilmour	20	1	13	1	7	0
	FW	(Scotland) SCO	Davie Halliday	43	24	36	19	7	5
	FW	(Scotland) SCO	Jimmy Hunter	19	2	18	2	1	0
	MF	(Ireland) EIR	Sam Irving	35	1	28	1	7	0
	FW	(Scotland) SCO	Willie Knox	17	0	16	0	1	0
	MF	(Scotland) SCO	Crawford Letham	4	0	4	0	0	0
	GK	(England) ENG	Bill Marsh	1	0	1	0	0	0
	FW	(Scotland) SCO	Jock McDonald	31	3	28	3	3	0
	FW	(Scotland) SCO	Davie McLean	40	9	33	5	7	4
	MF	(Scotland) SCO	Colin McNab	25	0	21	0	4	0
	FW	(Scotland) SCO	George Nicholson	10	2	10	2	0	0
	FW	(Scotland) SCO	John Rankin	18	2	11	0	7	2
	DF	(Scotland) SCO	Willie Rankin	39	3	32	2	7	1
	MF	(Scotland) SCO	Dave Robb	3	0	3	0	0	0
	DF	(Scotland) SCO	Jock Ross	36	0	32	0	4	0
	DF	(Scotland) SCO	David Thomson	42	2	36	2	6	0
	MF	(Scotland) SCO	Jock Thomson	1	0	1	0	0	0
	MF	(Scotland) SCO	Norman Wilson	3	0	3	0	0	0

== See also ==
- List of Dundee F.C. seasons
