= 1925–26 Dundee F.C. season =

Dundee
1925–26 season
- Manager: Alec McNair
- Division One: 10th
- Scottish Cup: Second round
- Top goalscorer: League: Alec Ross & Andy Campbell (9); All: Andy Campbell (11)
Home colours

The 1925–26 season was the thirty-first season in which Dundee competed at a Scottish national level, playing in Division One, where they would finish in 10th place under new manager Alec McNair. Dundee would also compete in the Scottish Cup, where they would be knocked out by Aberdeen in the 2nd round. For one season only, the Dee would wear a unique home jersey with a large white semicircle around the collar.

== Scottish Division One ==
Statistics provided by Dee Archive.

| Match day | Date | Opponent | H/A | Score | Dundee scorer(s) | Attendance |
|---|---|---|---|---|---|---|
| 1 | 15 August | Greenock Morton | H | 3–0 | Ross, Irving, Duncan | |
| 2 | 22 August | St Johnstone | H | 0–1 | | |
| 3 | 29 August | St Mirren | A | 2–2 | Anderson (2) | |
| 4 | 5 September | Hibernian | A | 1–2 | McLean | 18,000 |
| 5 | 12 September | Hamilton Academical | H | 2–2 | McLean, Hunter | |
| 6 | 19 September | Cowdenbeath | A | 0–5 | | |
| 7 | 26 September | Clydebank | H | 3–1 | Campbell, Cook, Ross | |
| 8 | 3 October | Heart of Midlothian | H | 1–0 | D. Thomson | 8,000 |
| 9 | 5 October | Motherwell | H | 1–2 | Campbell | |
| 10 | 10 October | Raith Rovers | A | 0–1 | | |
| 11 | 17 October | Aberdeen | H | 3–2 | Finlay (2), Nicholson | 14,000 |
| 12 | 24 October | Rangers | A | 2–1 | Ross, Nicholson | 12,000 |
| 13 | 31 October | Celtic | A | 0–0 | | 12,000 |
| 14 | 7 November | Partick Thistle | H | 3–1 | Ross (3) | |
| 15 | 14 November | Airdrieonians | A | 1–4 | Ross | |
| 16 | 21 November | Dundee United | H | 0–0 | | 18,000 |
| 17 | 28 November | Greenock Morton | A | 0–3 | | |
| 18 | 5 December | Queen's Park | A | 3–1 | Barclay (2), McLean | |
| 19 | 12 December | Kilmarnock | H | 1–0 | Cook | |
| 20 | 19 December | St Johnstone | A | 0–0 | | |
| 21 | 26 December | Hibernian | H | 1–4 | Barclay | 6,000 |
| 22 | 1 January | Aberdeen | A | 1–2 | Finlay | 18,000 |
| 23 | 2 January | Raith Rovers | H | 1–1 | Campbell | |
| 24 | 4 January | Dundee United | A | 1–0 | McLean | 20,059 |
| 25 | 9 January | St Mirren | H | 1–1 | D. Thomson | |
| 26 | 16 January | Kilmarnock | A | 2–5 | Ross (2) | |
| 27 | 30 January | Clydebank | A | 2–1 | Irving, Campbell | |
| 28 | 13 February | Hamilton Academical | A | 0–0 | | |
| 29 | 17 February | Falkirk | H | 1–0 | Cook | |
| 30 | 23 February | Partick Thistle | A | 1–0 | Campbell | |
| 31 | 27 February | Rangers | H | 1–5 | Meagher | 14,000 |
| 32 | 6 March | Falkirk | A | 0–1 | | |
| 33 | 17 March | Celtic | H | 1–2 | McNulty | 12,000 |
| 34 | 20 March | Motherwell | A | 0–2 | | |
| 35 | 27 March | Heart of Midlothian | A | 2–2 | Campbell (2) | 10,000 |
| 36 | 3 April | Airdrieonians | H | 0–1 | | |
| 37 | 10 April | Queen's Park | H | 2–1 | Campbell, Meagher | |
| 38 | 24 April | Cowdenbeath | H | 4–3 | Campbell, Meagher (2), J. Thomson | |

=== League table ===
| Pos | Team | Pld | W | D | L | GF | GA | GD | Pts |
|---|---|---|---|---|---|---|---|---|---|
| 8 | Falkirk | 38 | 14 | 14 | 10 | 61 | 57 | +4 | 42 |
| 9 | Kilmarnock | 38 | 17 | 7 | 14 | 79 | 77 | +2 | 41 |
| 10 | Dundee | 38 | 14 | 9 | 15 | 47 | 59 | −12 | 37 |
| 11 | Aberdeen | 38 | 13 | 10 | 15 | 49 | 54 | −5 | 36 |
| 12 | Hamilton Academical | 38 | 13 | 9 | 16 | 68 | 79 | −11 | 35 |

Source: "1925-1926 Division 1 - SPFL Archive". SPFL.

== Scottish Cup ==
Statistics provided by Dee Archive.

| Match day | Date | Opponent | H/A | Score | Dundee scorer(s) | Attendance |
|---|---|---|---|---|---|---|
| 1st round | 20 January | Caledonian | H | 2–0 | Campbell (2) | |
| 2nd round | 6 February | Aberdeen | A | 0–0 | | 12,621 |
| 2R replay | 10 February | Aberdeen | H | 0–3 | | 10,000 |

== Player statistics ==
Statistics provided by Dee Archive

| No. | Pos | Nat | Player | Total | | First Division | | Scottish Cup | |
| No. | Pos | Nat | Player | Apps | Goals | Apps | Goals | Apps | Goals |
|---|---|---|---|---|---|---|---|---|---|
| | FW | (Scotland) SCO | John Anderson | 3 | 2 | 3 | 2 | 0 | 0 |
| | FW | (Scotland) SCO | John Barclay | 10 | 3 | 9 | 3 | 1 | 0 |
| | GK | (Scotland) SCO | Jock Britton | 34 | 0 | 31 | 0 | 3 | 0 |
| | DF | (Scotland) SCO | Finlay Brown | 35 | 0 | 32 | 0 | 3 | 0 |
| | FW | (Scotland) SCO | Andy Campbell | 24 | 11 | 21 | 9 | 3 | 2 |
| | FW | (Scotland) SCO | Willie Cook | 38 | 3 | 36 | 3 | 2 | 0 |
| | FW | (Scotland) SCO | Charlie Duncan | 11 | 1 | 11 | 1 | 0 | 0 |
| | FW | (Scotland) SCO | Andy Finlay | 26 | 3 | 24 | 3 | 2 | 0 |
| | DF | (Scotland) SCO | Jock Gilmour | 11 | 0 | 11 | 0 | 0 | 0 |
| | FW | (Scotland) SCO | Jimmy Hunter | 11 | 1 | 11 | 1 | 0 | 0 |
| | MF | (Ireland) EIR | Sam Irving | 34 | 2 | 31 | 2 | 3 | 0 |
| | GK | (England) ENG | Bill Marsh | 7 | 0 | 7 | 0 | 0 | 0 |
| | FW | (Scotland) SCO | Davie McLean | 24 | 4 | 21 | 4 | 3 | 0 |
| | MF | (Scotland) SCO | Colin McNab | 36 | 0 | 33 | 0 | 3 | 0 |
| | MF | (Scotland) SCO | Bernie McNulty | 11 | 1 | 8 | 1 | 3 | 0 |
| | FW | (Scotland) SCO | Jim Meagher | 10 | 4 | 10 | 4 | 0 | 0 |
| | FW | (Scotland) SCO | George Nicholson | 12 | 2 | 12 | 2 | 0 | 0 |
| | FW | (Scotland) SCO | John Rankin | 2 | 0 | 2 | 0 | 0 | 0 |
| | DF | (Scotland) SCO | Willie Rankin | 36 | 0 | 33 | 0 | 3 | 0 |
| | MF | (Scotland) SCO | Dave Robb | 4 | 0 | 4 | 0 | 0 | 0 |
| | FW | (Scotland) SCO | Alec Ross | 19 | 9 | 18 | 9 | 1 | 0 |
| | DF | (Scotland) SCO | Jock Ross | 16 | 0 | 16 | 0 | 0 | 0 |
| | DF | (Scotland) SCO | David Thomson | 35 | 2 | 32 | 2 | 3 | 0 |
| | MF | (Scotland) SCO | Jock Thomson | 2 | 1 | 2 | 1 | 0 | 0 |

== See also ==
- List of Dundee F.C. seasons
