= 1926–27 Dundee F.C. season =

Dundee
1926–27 season
- Manager: Alec McNair
- Division One: 5th
- Scottish Cup: Third round
- Top goalscorer: League: Andy Campbell (30); All: Andy Campbell (35)
Home colours

The 1926–27 season was the thirty-second season in which Dundee competed at a Scottish national level, playing in Division One, where they would finish in 5th place. Dundee would also compete in the Scottish Cup, where they would make it to the 3rd round before being knocked out by Celtic. The club would return to its regular navy blue jersey this season.

== Scottish Division One ==
Statistics provided by Dee Archive.

| Match day | Date | Opponent | H/A | Score | Dundee scorer(s) | Attendance |
|---|---|---|---|---|---|---|
| 1 | 14 August | Heart of Midlothian | H | 4–1 | Rankin, Irving, Townrow, McGinn | 14,000 |
| 2 | 21 August | St Johnstone | A | 1–0 | Campbell | |
| 3 | 28 August | Dundee United | H | 5–0 | Campbell (4), Meagher | 20,000 |
| 4 | 4 September | Partick Thistle | A | 3–3 | Campbell (2), Townrow | |
| 5 | 11 September | Airdrieonians | H | 1–0 | Townrow | |
| 6 | 18 September | Motherwell | A | 5–2 | Cook (3), Campbell, Thomson | |
| 7 | 25 September | Dunfermline Athletic | H | 1–1 | Meagher | |
| 8 | 2 October | Celtic | A | 0–0 | | 25,000 |
| 9 | 9 October | St Mirren | H | 2–1 | Campbell, Cook | |
| 10 | 16 October | Cowdenbeath | H | 1–2 | Meagher | |
| 11 | 23 October | Falkirk | A | 1–3 | Cassidy | |
| 12 | 30 October | Aberdeen | A | 1–2 | Campbell | 18,000 |
| 13 | 6 November | Hibernian | H | 3–0 | Campbell (3) | 7,000 |
| 14 | 13 November | Kilmarnock | A | 2–3 | McGinn, Cook | |
| 15 | 20 November | Hamilton Academical | A | 4–1 | Cook, Campbell (2), Hunter | |
| 16 | 27 November | Greenock Morton | H | 6–1 | Campbell (4), Hunter, Cook | |
| 17 | 4 December | Clyde | A | 2–2 | Cassidy, Hunter | |
| 18 | 11 December | Rangers | H | 1–1 | Hunter | 18,000 |
| 19 | 25 December | Heart of Midlothian | A | 0–0 | | 16,500 |
| 20 | 1 January | Aberdeen | H | 1–1 | McNab | 16,500 |
| 21 | 3 January | Dundee United | A | 0–1 | | 20,000 |
| 22 | 8 January | Partick Thistle | H | 4–2 | Campbell (2), Cook, Cassidy | |
| 23 | 15 January | Airdrieonians | A | 1–3 | Campbell | |
| 24 | 29 January | Motherwell | H | 3–1 | Campbell (3) | |
| 25 | 12 February | Celtic | H | 1–2 | Cook | 18,000 |
| 26 | 16 February | Dunfermline Athletic | A | 3–4 | Meagher, Cook, Campbell | |
| 27 | 22 February | St Mirren | A | 2–2 | Ramage (2) | |
| 28 | 26 February | Cowdenbeath | A | 1–0 | Meagher | |
| 29 | 12 March | St Johnstone | H | 4–1 | Agar, Campbell, McNab, Kirkwood (o.g.) | |
| 30 | 16 March | Falkirk | H | 2–3 | Cassidy, Cook | |
| 31 | 19 March | Hibernian | A | 1–0 | Campbell | 8,000 |
| 32 | 26 March | Kilmarnock | H | 1–2 | Gilmour | |
| 33 | 2 April | Hamilton Academical | H | 1–0 | Cassidy | |
| 34 | 9 April | Greenock Morton | A | 1–3 | Gilmour | |
| 35 | 16 April | Clyde | H | 1–2 | Gilmour | |
| 36 | 18 April | Queen's Park | A | 4–1 | Campbell (2), McNab, Townrow | |
| 37 | 23 April | Rangers | A | 0–0 | | 12,000 |
| 38 | 30 April | Queen's Park | H | 3–0 | Ramage, Brown, Townrow | |

=== League table ===
| Pos | Team | Pld | W | D | L | GF | GA | GD | Pts |
|---|---|---|---|---|---|---|---|---|---|
| 3 | Celtic | 38 | 21 | 7 | 10 | 101 | 55 | +46 | 49 |
| 4 | Airdrieonians | 38 | 18 | 9 | 11 | 97 | 64 | +33 | 45 |
| 5 | Dundee | 38 | 17 | 9 | 12 | 77 | 51 | +26 | 43 |
| 6 | Falkirk | 38 | 15 | 12 | 11 | 77 | 60 | +17 | 42 |
| 7 | Cowdenbeath | 38 | 18 | 6 | 14 | 74 | 60 | +14 | 42 |

Source: "1926-1927 Division 1 - SPFL Archive". SPFL.

== Scottish Cup ==
Statistics provided by Dee Archive.

| Match day | Date | Opponent | H/A | Score | Dundee scorer(s) | Attendance |
|---|---|---|---|---|---|---|
| 1st round | 22 January | Motherwell | H | 3–0 | Campbell (2), Cook | |
| 2nd round | 5 February | Kilmarnock | A | 1–1 | Townrow | |
| 2R replay | 9 February | Kilmarnock | H | 5–1 | Campbell (2), Cassidy, Cook, Townrow | |
| 3rd round | 19 February | Celtic | H | 2–4 | Campbell, Cook | 37,471 |

== Player statistics ==
Statistics provided by Dee Archive

| No. | Pos | Nat | Player | Total | | First Division | | Scottish Cup | |
| No. | Pos | Nat | Player | Apps | Goals | Apps | Goals | Apps | Goals |
|---|---|---|---|---|---|---|---|---|---|
| | FW | (England) ENG | Alf Agar | 3 | 1 | 3 | 1 | 0 | 0 |
| | DF | (Scotland) SCO | Finlay Brown | 42 | 1 | 38 | 1 | 4 | 0 |
| | FW | (Scotland) SCO | Andy Campbell | 36 | 35 | 32 | 30 | 4 | 5 |
| | FW | (Scotland) SCO | Joe Cassidy | 31 | 6 | 27 | 5 | 4 | 1 |
| | FW | (Scotland) SCO | Willie Cook | 37 | 14 | 33 | 11 | 4 | 3 |
| | MF | (Scotland) SCO | John Crawford | 13 | 0 | 13 | 0 | 0 | 0 |
| | DF | (Scotland) SCO | John Devine | 1 | 0 | 1 | 0 | 0 | 0 |
| | FW | (Scotland) SCO | Bobby Farrell | 4 | 0 | 4 | 0 | 0 | 0 |
| | FW | (Scotland) SCO | Tom Flanagan | 1 | 0 | 1 | 0 | 0 | 0 |
| | DF | (Scotland) SCO | Jock Gilmour | 18 | 2 | 17 | 2 | 1 | 0 |
| | FW | (Scotland) SCO | Jimmy Hunter | 18 | 4 | 18 | 4 | 0 | 0 |
| | MF | (Ireland) EIR | Sam Irving | 1 | 1 | 1 | 1 | 0 | 0 |
| | GK | (England) ENG | Bill Marsh | 42 | 0 | 38 | 0 | 4 | 0 |
| | FW | (Scotland) SCO | Hugh McGinn | 34 | 2 | 30 | 2 | 4 | 0 |
| | MF | (Scotland) SCO | Colin McNab | 28 | 3 | 24 | 3 | 4 | 0 |
| | FW | (Scotland) SCO | Jim Meagher | 15 | 5 | 15 | 5 | 0 | 0 |
| | FW | (Scotland) SCO | Andy Ramage | 7 | 4 | 7 | 4 | 0 | 0 |
| | DF | (Scotland) SCO | Willie Rankin | 34 | 1 | 30 | 1 | 4 | 0 |
| | DF | (Scotland) SCO | Jock Ross | 17 | 0 | 15 | 0 | 2 | 0 |
| | DF | (Scotland) SCO | David Thomson | 29 | 1 | 25 | 1 | 4 | 0 |
| | MF | (Scotland) SCO | Jock Thomson | 24 | 0 | 23 | 0 | 1 | 0 |
| | FW | (Scotland) SCO | Frank Townrow | 27 | 7 | 23 | 5 | 4 | 2 |

== See also ==
- List of Dundee F.C. seasons
