= 1923–24 Dundee F.C. season =

Dundee
1923–24 season
- Manager: Sandy MacFarlane
- Stadium: Dens Park
- Division One: 5th
- Scottish Cup: Second round
- Top goalscorer: League: Dave Halliday (38); All: Dave Halliday (39)
Home colours

The 1923–24 season was the twenty-ninth season in which Dundee competed at a Scottish national level, playing in Division One, where they would finish in 5th place. Dundee would also compete in the Scottish Cup, where they were knocked out in the 2nd round by Raith Rovers. During this season, striker Dave Halliday would set the record for most goals scored by a Dundee player in a league campaign, topping the Scottish scoring charts with 38 goals, a total that remains a Dundee record to this day.

For the second straight year, Dundee would follow up their season with a footballing tour of Spain. They would get revenge over Barcelona and consolidate their success over Real Madrid by beating both, becoming the first club outside of Spain to defeat both at their respective home grounds.

== Scottish Division One ==
Statistics provided by Dee Archive.

Match day	Date	Opponent	H/A	Score	Dundee scorer(s)	Attendance
1	18 August	Raith Rovers	A	0–3		
2	25 August	Heart of Midlothian	H	5–1	Bird (2), Knox (2), McLean	13,000
3	1 September	Aberdeen	A	0–0		19,000
4	8 September	Third Lanark	H	1–0	D. McDonald	
5	15 September	St Mirren	A	2–2	D. McDonald, Halliday	
6	22 September	Queen's Park	H	3–0	Halliday (3)	
7	29 September	Kilmarnock	A	3–1	J. McDonald, McLean, Halliday	
8	6 October	Rangers	H	1–4	Halliday	22,000
9	13 October	Motherwell	A	2–4	Halliday, J. McDonald	
10	20 October	Airdrieonians	H	3–1	Halliday (2), J. McDonald	
11	27 October	Hibernian	H	7–2	J. McDonald, Halliday (4), McLean, Duncan	12,000
12	3 November	Greenock Morton	A	1–2	Halliday	
13	10 November	Clydebank	H	4–1	Halliday (3), Irving	
14	17 November	Celtic	A	0–0		10,000
15	24 November	Hamilton Academical	A	0–0		
16	1 December	Falkirk	H	4–2	McLean (2), Duncan, Halliday	
17	8 December	Partick Thistle	H	0–0		
18	15 December	Ayr United	A	0–2		
19	22 December	Celtic	H	2–1	Halliday, McLean	20,000
20	29 December	Heart of Midlothian	A	0–1		13,000
21	1 January	Aberdeen	H	1–1	McLean	17,000
22	2 January	Falkirk	A	1–4	Halliday	
23	5 January	Raith Rovers	H	1–1	Duncan	
24	12 January	Rangers	A	1–1	Halliday	10,000
25	19 January	Kilmarnock	H	4–2	Halliday (3), McLean	
26	2 February	Clyde	A	2–0	Halliday (2)	
27	16 February	Hibernian	A	0–2		10,000
28	20 February	Ayr United	H	2–1	Duncan, Halliday	
29	23 February	Third Lanark	A	5–3	Halliday (4), McGrory	
30	27 February	Airdrieonians	A	2–4	Halliday (2)	
31	1 March	Greenock Morton	H	1–1	Duncan	
32	8 March	Motherwell	H	4–1	McLean (2), Halliday (2)	
33	15 March	Hamilton Academical	H	1–1	McLean	
34	22 March	Partick Thistle	A	2–5	McLean, Halliday	
35	29 March	St Mirren	H	1–1	Halliday	
36	5 April	Clyde	H	3–1	Duncan (2), Halliday	
37	12 April	Queen's Park	A	1–1	McGrory	
38	19 April	Clydebank	A	0–0		

=== League table ===
Pos	Team	Pld	W	D	L	GF	GA	GD	Pts
3	Celtic	38	17	12	9	56	33	+23	46
4	Raith Rovers	38	18	7	13	56	38	+18	43
5	Dundee	38	15	13	10	70	57	+13	43
6	St Mirren	38	15	12	11	53	45	+8	42
7	Hibernian	38	15	11	12	66	52	+14	41

Source: "1923-1924 Division 1 - SPFL Archive". SPFL (in Malay).

== Scottish Cup ==
Statistics provided by Dee Archive.

Match day	Date	Opponent	H/A	Score	Dundee scorer(s)	Attendance
1st round	26 January	Dykehead	H	2–0	McLean, Halliday	
2nd round	9 February	Raith Rovers	H	0–0		
2R replay	13 February	Raith Rovers	A	0–1		

== 1924 Tour of Spain ==
Date	Opponent	H/A	Score	Dundee scorer(s)	Attendance
2 June	Barcelona	A	2–0	Halliday (2)	
6 June	Barcelona	A	2–1	Duncan, McLean	
8 June	Real Madrid	A	1–1	McLean	6,000
9 June	Real Madrid	A	2–1	Duncan, Letham	12,000
11 June	Deportivo de La Coruña	A	3–3	McLean (3)	
13 June	Deportivo de La Coruña	A	1–5	McLean	
15 June	Deportivo de La Coruña	A	2–0	McLean	

== Player statistics ==
Statistics provided by Dee Archive

No.	Pos	Nat	Player	Total		First Division		Scottish Cup	
No.	Pos	Nat	Player	Apps	Goals	Apps	Goals	Apps	Goals
	FW	(England) ENG	Walter Bird	8	2	8	2	0	0
	DF	(Scotland) SCO	Finlay Brown	30	0	27	0	3	0
	MF	(Scotland) SCO	Hugh Coyle	36	0	33	0	3	0
	FW	(Scotland) SCO	Charlie Duncan	33	7	30	7	3	0
	GK	(Scotland) SCO	Willie Fotheringham	38	0	35	0	3	0
	DF	(Scotland) SCO	Jock Gilmour	16	0	16	0	0	0
	FW	(Scotland) SCO	Francis Gordon	1	0	1	0	0	0
	DF	(Scotland) SCO	Sandy Herd	1	0	1	0	0	0
	FW	(Scotland) SCO	Davie Halliday	39	39	36	38	3	1
	MF	(Ireland) EIR	Sam Irving	12	1	12	1	0	0
	FW	(Scotland) SCO	Willie Knox	26	2	24	2	2	0
	MF	(Scotland) SCO	Crawford Letham	10	0	10	0	0	0
	FW	(Scotland) SCO	Dave McDonald	6	2	4	2	2	0
	FW	(Scotland) SCO	Jock McDonald	40	4	38	4	2	0
	GK	(Scotland) SCO	Harry McGregor	3	0	3	0	0	0
	FW	(Scotland) SCO	Tom McGrory	12	2	12	2	0	0
	FW	(Scotland) SCO	Davie McLean	36	13	33	12	3	1
	FW	(Scotland) SCO	Jim O'Neill	3	0	3	0	0	0
	DF	(Scotland) SCO	Willie Rankin	36	0	33	0	3	0
	FW	(Scotland) SCO	Alec Ross	1	0	1	0	0	0
	DF	(Scotland) SCO	Jock Ross	32	0	29	0	3	0
	DF	(Scotland) SCO	David Thomson	31	0	28	0	3	0
	FW	(Scotland) SCO	Jimmy Walker	1	0	1	0	0	0

== See also ==
- List of Dundee F.C. seasons
