= 1922–23 Dundee F.C. season =

Dundee
1922–23 season
- Manager: Sandy MacFarlane
- Stadium: Dens Park
- Division One: 7th
- Scottish Cup: Quarter-finals
- Top goalscorer: League: Davie McLean (22); All: Davie McLean (23)
Home colours

The 1922–23 season was the twenty-eighth season in which Dundee competed at a Scottish national level, playing in Division One, where they would finish in 7th place. Dundee would also compete in the Scottish Cup, where they were knocked out in the Quarter-finals on the third attempt by Third Lanark.

At the end of the season, Dundee would embark on a football tour of Spain, facing off against illustrious names such as Real Madrid and Barcelona, and impressing with good results, including a win over the former, despite the demands of the tour.

== Scottish Division One ==
Statistics provided by Dee Archive.

Match day	Date	Opponent	H/A	Score	Dundee scorer(s)	Attendance
1	19 August	Aberdeen	H	1–1	D. McLean	22,000
2	26 August	Heart of Midlothian	A	1–2	D. McLean	28,500
3	29 August	Clyde	A	3–4	D. McLean (3)	
4	2 September	Kilmarnock	H	2–0	D. McLean (2)	
5	9 September	Motherwell	A	4–3	Bell, Cowan, D. McLean, Troup	
6	16 September	Partick Thistle	H	1–0	D. McLean	
7	23 September	Celtic	H	0–1		25,000
8	30 September	Albion Rovers	A	0–0		
9	2 October	Third Lanark	H	2–0	Cowan (2)	
10	7 October	Ayr United	H	1–0	D. McLean	
11	14 October	Alloa Athletic	A	3–1	Halliday, D. McLean (2)	
12	21 October	Hamilton Academical	H	3–0	Cowan, D. McLean, Halliday	
13	28 October	Raith Rovers	A	3–0	Cowan, D. McLean (2)	
14	4 November	Airdrieonians	H	1–0	D. McLean	
15	11 November	Hibernian	A	3–3	D. McLean, Halliday (2)	18,000
16	18 November	St Mirren	H	2–0	D. McLean (2)	
17	25 November	Greenock Morton	A	3–2	D. McLean (2), Halliday	
18	2 December	Raith Rovers	H	0–4		
19	9 December	Rangers	A	1–4	Knox	35,000
20	16 December	Alloa Athletic	H	2–1	D. McLean, Troup	
21	23 December	Falkirk	A	0–1		
22	25 December	Third Lanark	A	0–2		
23	30 December	Albion Rovers	H	4–0	W. McLean, McDonald (2), Halliday	
24	1 January	Aberdeen	A	0–0		23,000
25	2 January	Hibernian	H	1–0	McDonald	20,000
26	6 January	Kilmarnock	A	0–2		
27	20 January	Heart of Midlothian	H	0–0		12,000
28	3 February	Partick Thistle	A	0–2		
29	6 February	St Mirren	A	0–4		
30	17 February	Airdrieonians	A	1–1	W. McLean	
31	3 March	Ayr United	A	0–1		
32	10 March	Greenock Morton	H	0–1		
33	17 March	Celtic	A	1–2	Gibson	7,000
34	24 March	Rangers	H	1–2	Halliday	20,000
35	31 March	Hamilton Academical	A	0–0		
36	7 April	Clyde	H	1–0	Thomson	
37	9 April	Falkirk	H	3–0	Bird, Halliday (2)	
38	14 April	Motherwell	H	3–1	Cowan, Halliday, Thomson	

=== League table ===
Pos	Team	Pld	W	D	L	GF	GA	GD	Pts
5	Aberdeen	38	15	12	11	46	34	+12	42
6	St Mirren	38	15	12	11	54	44	+10	42
7	Dundee	38	17	7	14	51	45	+6	41
8	Hibernian	38	17	7	14	45	40	+5	41
9	Raith Rovers	38	13	13	12	31	43	−12	39

Source: "1922-1923 Division 1 - SPFL Archive". SPFL.

== Scottish Cup ==
Statistics provided by Dee Archive.

Match day	Date	Opponent	H/A	Score	Dundee scorer(s)	Attendance
1st round	13 January	Vale of Atholl	H	6–0	Troup, Cowan (2), Halliday (3)	
2nd round	27 January	St Bernard's	H	0–0		
2R replay	31 January	St Bernard's	A	3–2	Halliday, D. McLean, Knox	
3rd round	10 February	Hamilton Academical	H	0–0		
3R replay	14 February	Hamilton Academical	A	1–0	Knox	
Quarter-finals	24 February	Third Lanark	A	1–1	Halliday	
QF replay	28 February	Third Lanark	H	0–0		
QF 2nd replay	5 March	Third Lanark	N	0–1		

== 1923 Tour of Spain ==
Date	Opponent	H/A	Score	Dundee scorer(s)	Attendance
20 May	Athletic Bilbao	A	3–0	McDonald, Halliday (2)	10,000
21 May	Athletic Bilbao	A	1–1	D. McLean	9,000
24 May	Real Madrid	A	2–0	Halliday (2)	11,000
26 May	Valencia	A	3–0	Halliday (2)	
27 May	Valencia	A	1–0	McDonald	
3 June	Barcelona	A	1–3		20,000
4 June	Barcelona	A	0–2		28,000

== Player statistics ==
Statistics provided by Dee Archive

No.	Pos	Nat	Player	Total		First Division		Scottish Cup	
No.	Pos	Nat	Player	Apps	Goals	Apps	Goals	Apps	Goals
	DF	(Scotland) SCO	George Aimer	17	0	16	0	1	0
	FW	(Scotland) SCO	Robert Bell	6	1	6	1	0	0
	FW	(England) ENG	Walter Bird	16	1	12	1	4	0
	FW	(Scotland) SCO	Willie Cowan	36	8	30	6	6	2
	MF	(Scotland) SCO	Hugh Coyle	13	0	10	0	3	0
	FW	(Scotland) SCO	Peter Dyer	2	0	2	0	0	0
	GK	(Scotland) SCO	Willie Fotheringham	46	0	38	0	8	0
	FW	(Scotland) SCO	George Gibson	2	1	2	1	0	0
	MF	(Scotland) SCO	George Greenshields	11	0	11	0	0	0
	FW	(Scotland) SCO	Davie Halliday	34	15	26	10	8	5
	MF	(Ireland) EIR	Sam Irving	38	0	30	0	8	0
	FW	(Scotland) SCO	Willie Knox	31	3	23	1	8	2
	MF	(Scotland) SCO	Crawford Letham	20	0	18	0	2	0
	DF	(Scotland) SCO	Bob Maiden	2	0	2	0	0	0
	FW	(Scotland) SCO	Jock McDonald	28	3	25	3	3	0
	FW	(Scotland) SCO	Davie McLean	31	23	24	22	7	1
	FW	(Scotland) SCO	Willie McLean	14	2	11	2	3	0
	MF	(Scotland) SCO	Dave Nicol	21	0	16	0	5	0
	DF	(Scotland) SCO	Willie Rankin	31	0	27	0	4	0
	DF	(Scotland) SCO	Ralph Rogerson	8	0	5	0	3	0
	DF	(Scotland) SCO	Jock Ross	34	0	27	0	7	0
	DF	(Scotland) SCO	David Thomson	37	2	30	2	7	0
	FW	(Scotland) SCO	Alec Troup	17	3	16	2	1	1
	FW	(Scotland) SCO	Neil Turner	9	0	9	0	0	0
	MF	(England) ENG	Bob Willis	2	0	2	0	0	0

== See also ==
- List of Dundee F.C. seasons
