= 1928–29 Dundee F.C. season =

Dundee
1928–29 season
- Manager: Jimmy Bissett
- Division One: 18th
- Scottish Cup: Third round
- Top goalscorer: League: Gus Smith (12); All: Gus Smith (15)
Home colours	Away colours

The 1928–29 season was the thirty-fourth season in which Dundee competed at a Scottish national level, playing in Division One under new manager Jimmy Bissett, where they would finish in 18th place, surviving relegation by 3 points. Dundee would also compete in the Scottish Cup, where they would make it to the 3rd round for the third consecutive season before being knocked out by rivals Dundee United, a reverse from the previous season. The club would change jersey design, favouring a collar over buttons and white borders to the arms, whilst continuing to occasionally wear black shorts as a change kit.

== Scottish Division One ==
Statistics provided by Dee Archive.

Match day	Date	Opponent	H/A	Score	Dundee scorer(s)	Attendance
1	11 August	Celtic	H	0–1		19,000
2	18 August	Partick Thistle	A	2–4	An. Campbell, Townrow	
3	25 August	St Mirren	H	2–3	Craddock, Gilmour	
4	1 September	Kilmarnock	A	1–3	An. Campbell	
5	8 September	Rangers	H	2–3	O'Hare, Cook	16,000
6	15 September	Hamilton Academical	H	0–1		
7	22 September	Falkirk	A	3–1	Smith (2), Craddock	
8	29 September	Heart of Midlothian	H	5–3	Smith, Cook, Thomson, Gilmour (2)	12,000
9	6 October	Raith Rovers	A	3–0	McNab, Smith (2)	8,000
10	13 October	Third Lanark	H	2–2	McNab, Craddock	
11	20 October	St Johnstone	A	2–2	Smith (2)	
12	27 October	Ayr United	H	2–3	Townrow, Smith	
13	3 November	Airdrieonians	A	1–1	Townrow	
14	10 November	Clyde	A	1–2	Townrow	
15	17 November	Aberdeen	H	1–1	Craddock	15,000
16	24 November	Cowdenbeath	A	2–4	Townrow, Smith	
17	1 December	Queen's Park	A	4–2	O'Hare (3), Cook	
18	8 December	Motherwell	H	3–0	O'Hare, Smith (2)	
19	15 December	Hibernian	A	0–2		12,000
20	22 December	Partick Thistle	H	0–0		
21	25 December	Third Lanark	A	2–1	Barrett, Lawley	
22	29 December	Celtic	A	1–2	Smith	10,000
23	1 January	St Johnstone	H	0–2		
24	2 January	Ayr United	A	3–0	Thomson, Lawley, Craddock	
25	12 January	Kilmarnock	H	1–3	Townrow	
26	26 January	Hibernian	A	1–0	Townrow	8,000
27	9 February	Falkirk	H	1–2	Thomson	
28	23 February	Raith Rovers	H	0–3		
29	6 March	Heart of Midlothian	A	1–1	An. Campbell	6,000
30	9 March	Airdrieonians	H	2–2	An. Campbell, Barrett	
31	16 March	Clyde	H	1–2	Gibb	
32	23 March	Aberdeen	A	0–4		12,000
33	30 March	Cowdenbeath	H	4–0	Gibb, Robertson, McNab, Townrow	
34	6 April	Queen's Park	H	0–0		
35	12 April	Hamilton Academical	A	3–3	An. Campbell (2), Gibb	
36	20 April	Motherwell	A	1–1	Townrow	
37	22 April	St Mirren	A	2–2	O'Hare (2)	
38	30 April	Rangers	A	0–3		5,000

=== League table ===
Pos	Team	Pld	W	D	L	GF	GA	GD	Pts
16	Ayr United	38	12	7	19	65	84	−19	31
17	Clyde	38	12	6	20	47	71	−24	30
18	Dundee	38	9	11	18	59	59	0	29
19	Third Lanark	38	10	6	22	71	102	−31	26
20	Raith Rovers	38	9	6	23	52	105	−53	24

== Scottish Cup ==
Statistics provided by Dee Archive.

Match day	Date	Opponent	H/A	Score	Dundee scorer(s)	Attendance
1st round	19 January	King's Park	H	1–1	Smith	
1R replay	23 January	King's Park	A	5–1	Crickett (o.g.), Smith (2), O'Hare, Gilmour	
2nd round	2 February	Brechin City	H	6–1	Craddock, Townrow (2), An. Campbell, McNab, Lawley	
3rd round	16 February	Dundee United	H	1–1	Lawley	24,000
3R replay	20 February	Dundee United	A	0–1		14,000

== Player statistics ==
Statistics provided by Dee Archive

No.	Pos	Nat	Player	Total		First Division		Scottish Cup	
No.	Pos	Nat	Player	Apps	Goals	Apps	Goals	Apps	Goals
	MF	(Scotland) SCO	Peter Barrett	19	2	15	2	4	0
	DF	(Scotland) SCO	Finlay Brown	34	0	29	0	5	0
	FW	(Scotland) SCO	Andy Campbell	16	7	15	6	1	1
	MF	(England) ENG	Archie Campbell	5	0	4	0	1	0
	FW	(Scotland) SCO	Willie Cook	18	3	18	3	0	0
	FW	(England) ENG	Claude Craddock	21	6	18	5	3	1
	MF	(Scotland) SCO	John Crawford	3	0	3	0	0	0
	FW	(Scotland) SCO	Willie Gibb	8	3	8	3	0	0
	DF	(Scotland) SCO	Jock Gilmour	40	4	35	3	5	1
	MF	(England) ENG	George Lawley	27	4	22	2	5	2
	MF	(Scotland) SCO	Tom Lynch	3	0	3	0	0	0
	GK	(England) ENG	Bill Marsh	38	0	33	0	5	0
	MF	(Scotland) SCO	Tom McCarthy	2	0	2	0	0	0
	MF	(Scotland) SCO	Colin McNab	39	4	34	3	5	1
	FW	(Scotland) SCO	Henry Nicholson	9	0	9	0	0	0
	FW	(Scotland) SCO	Willie O'Hare	24	8	21	7	3	1
	DF	(Scotland) SCO	Jim Paton	37	0	32	0	5	0
	FW	(Scotland) SCO	Jimmy Robertson	10	1	10	1	0	0
	GK	(Scotland) SCO	Peter Robertson	5	0	5	0	0	0
	DF	(Scotland) SCO	Jock Ross	17	0	17	0	0	0
	FW	(Scotland) SCO	Gus Smith	22	15	19	12	3	3
	MF	(Scotland) SCO	Jock Thomson	40	3	35	3	5	0
	FW	(Scotland) SCO	Frank Townrow	36	11	31	9	5	2

== See also ==
- List of Dundee F.C. seasons
