= 1927–28 Dundee F.C. season =

Dundee
1927–28 season
- Manager: Alec McNair (until Oct. 1927); Sandy MacFarlane (from Oct. 1927)
- Division One: 14th
- Scottish Cup: Third round
- Top goalscorer: League: Gus Smith (24); All: Gus Smith (24)
Home colours	Away colours

The 1927–28 season was the thirty-third season in which Dundee competed at a Scottish national level, playing in Division One. After a poor start, manager Alec McNair was replaced by Sandy MacFarlane in his 2nd stint, who led the Dark Blues to finish in 14th place. Dundee would also compete in the Scottish Cup, where they would make it to the 3rd round before being knocked out by Dunfermline Athletic. The club would also wear black shorts occasionally as a change kit.

== Scottish Division One ==
Statistics provided by Dee Archive.

Match day	Date	Opponent	H/A	Score	Dundee scorer(s)	Attendance
1	13 August	Cowdenbeath	A	0–1		
2	20 August	Motherwell	H	0–3		
3	27 August	St Mirren	A	0–0		
4	3 September	Partick Thistle	H	4–2	Hunter, O'Hare, Campbell, Cook	
5	10 September	Bo'ness	A	0–2		
6	17 September	St Johnstone	H	1–2	Pirie	
7	24 September	Airdrieonians	A	1–1	O'Hare	
8	1 October	Celtic	H	1–4	Gilmour	13,000
9	8 October	Heart of Midlothian	A	0–1		22,500
10	15 October	Aberdeen	H	3–2	Smith (2), Godfrey	10,000
11	22 October	Falkirk	H	1–0	Smith	
12	29 October	Dunfermline Athletic	A	1–3	Smith	
13	5 November	Hibernian	A	0–4		7,000
14	12 November	Kilmarnock	H	7–0	O'Hare, Cassidy (2), Smith (3), Brown	
15	19 November	Hamilton Academical	H	3–1	O'Hare, Smith, Cook	
16	26 November	Raith Rovers	A	1–1	O'Hare	
17	3 December	Clyde	H	4–3	McNab, Smith, Cassidy	
18	10 December	Rangers	A	1–5	O'Hare	7,000
19	17 December	Queen's Park	H	1–3	O'Hare	
20	24 December	Cowdenbeath	H	3–1	Smith, O'Hare, Gilmour	
21	31 December	Partick Thistle	A	2–2	Smith, Thomson	
22	2 January	Aberdeen	A	1–3	Smith	15,000
23	3 January	Bo'ness	H	3–2	O'Hare (2), Gilmour	
24	7 January	St Mirren	H	2–1	O'Hare, McNab	
25	14 January	St Johnstone	A	1–5	Smith	
26	28 January	Heart of Midlothian	H	2–7	O'Hare, Smith	6,000
27	11 February	Airdrieonians	H	3–0	O'Hare (2), Smith	
28	14 February	Celtic	A	1–3	Smith	12,000
29	22 February	Dunfermline Athletic	H	3–2	Craddock (2), Smith	
30	25 February	Falkirk	A	1–5	McNab	
31	7 March	Motherwell	A	2–2	Cassidy, Smith	
32	10 March	Hibernian	H	4–1	Townrow (2), Smith (2)	2,000
33	17 March	Kilmarnock	A	2–1	Lawley, Smith	
34	24 March	Hamilton Academical	A	3–3	Smith, Townrow, Cassidy	
35	31 March	Raith Rovers	H	1–2	Smith	
36	7 April	Clyde	A	0–0		
37	18 April	Rangers	H	0–1		12,000
38	21 April	Queen's Park	A	2–1	Smith, Cook	

=== League table ===
Pos	Team	Pld	W	D	L	GF	GA	GD	Pts
12	Hibernian	38	13	9	16	73	75	−2	35
13	Airdrieonians	38	12	11	15	59	69	−10	35
14	Dundee	38	14	7	17	65	80	−15	35
15	Clyde	38	10	11	17	46	72	−26	31
16	Queen's Park	38	12	6	20	69	80	−11	30

Source: "1927-1928 Division 1 - SPFL Archive". SPFL.

== Scottish Cup ==
Statistics provided by Dee Archive.

Match day	Date	Opponent	H/A	Score	Dundee scorer(s)	Attendance
1st round	21 January	Stranraer	A	4–2	Townrow, McGarry, Cook, Hunter	
2nd round	4 February	Dundee United	A	3–3	Lawley, Whitlow (2)	20,365
2R replay	8 February	Dundee United	H	1–0	O'Hare	12,839
3rd round	18 February	Dunfermline Athletic	H	1–2	Whitlow	

== Player statistics ==
Statistics provided by Dee Archive

No.	Pos	Nat	Player	Total		First Division		Scottish Cup	
No.	Pos	Nat	Player	Apps	Goals	Apps	Goals	Apps	Goals
	DF	(Scotland) SCO	Finlay Brown	31	1	30	1	1	0
	FW	(Scotland) SCO	Andy Campbell	5	1	5	1	0	0
	FW	(Scotland) SCO	Joe Cassidy	26	5	24	5	2	0
	FW	(Scotland) SCO	Willie Cook	33	5	30	4	3	1
	FW	(England) ENG	Claude Craddock	3	2	2	2	1	0
	MF	(Scotland) SCO	John Crawford	20	0	18	0	2	0
	FW	(Scotland) SCO	Bobby Farrell	12	0	12	0	0	0
	DF	(Scotland) SCO	Jock Gilmour	38	3	34	3	4	0
	FW	(Scotland) SCO	Ed Godfrey	23	1	21	1	2	0
	FW	(Scotland) SCO	Jimmy Hunter	7	2	6	1	1	1
	MF	(Scotland) SCO	Bob Kearney	1	0	1	0	0	0
	MF	(England) ENG	George Lawley	15	2	12	1	3	1
	GK	(England) ENG	Bill Marsh	39	0	35	0	4	0
	MF	(Scotland) SCO	Ed McGarry	2	1	1	0	1	1
	MF	(Scotland) SCO	Colin McNab	34	3	34	3	0	0
	FW	(Scotland) SCO	Billy McNeill	1	0	1	0	0	0
	FW	(Scotland) SCO	Jim Meagher	3	0	3	0	0	0
	FW	(Scotland) SCO	Willie O'Hare	33	15	29	14	4	1
	FW	(Scotland) SCO	Jim Pirie	2	1	2	1	0	0
	GK	(Scotland) SCO	Peter Robertson	3	0	3	0	0	0
	DF	(Scotland) SCO	Jock Ross	24	0	20	0	4	0
	FW	(Scotland) SCO	Gus Smith	30	24	29	24	1	0
	MF	(Scotland) SCO	Jock Thomson	42	1	38	1	4	0
	FW	(Scotland) SCO	Frank Townrow	30	4	26	3	4	1
	FW	(Scotland) SCO	Fred Whitlow	5	3	2	0	3	3

== See also ==
- List of Dundee F.C. seasons
