= 1921–22 Dundee F.C. season =

Dundee
1921–22 season
- Manager: Sandy MacFarlane
- Stadium: Dens Park
- Division One: 4th
- Scottish Cup: 3rd round
- Top goalscorer: League: Davie Halliday (23); All: Davie Halliday (25)
Home colours

The 1921–22 season was the twenty-seventh season in which Dundee competed at a Scottish national level, playing in Division One. They would finish in 4th place for the third consecutive season. Dundee would also compete in the Scottish Cup, where they were knocked out in the 3rd round by Aberdeen.

== Scottish Division One ==
Statistics provided by Dee Archive.

Match day	Date	Opponent	H/A	Score	Dundee scorer(s)	Attendance
1	17 August	Airdrieonians	H	1–1	McLean	
2	20 August	Falkirk	A	0–1		
3	27 August	Third Lanark	H	2–0	Cowan, Bell	
4	3 September	Aberdeen	A	2–1	Bird, Nicoll	18,000
5	10 September	Greenock Morton	A	1–2	Bird	
6	17 September	Ayr United	H	1–0	McLean	
7	21 September	Motherwell	A	1–2	Halliday	
8	24 September	Queen's Park	H	3–1	Bird (2), Troup	
9	1 October	Airdrieonians	A	2–0	Halliday, Troup	
10	3 October	Motherwell	H	1–1	Halliday	
11	8 October	Celtic	H	0–0		26,000
12	15 October	Heart of Midlothian	A	0–0		26,500
13	22 October	Kilmarnock	H	5–0	Bird, Halliday (2), McLean, Troup	
14	29 October	Clydebank	A	3–0	Halliday, Bird, Johnstone	
15	5 November	Rangers	H	0–0		39,000
16	12 November	Hibernian	A	1–1	Halliday	12,000
17	19 November	Albion Rovers	H	2–0	Halliday, Bird	
18	26 November	St Mirren	A	1–2	Bell	
19	3 December	Clyde	H	2–1	McLean, Bird	
20	10 December	Raith Rovers	A	0–0		
21	17 December	Dumbarton	A	0–2		4,000
22	24 December	Hamilton Academical	H	2–0	Bell, McLean	
23	26 December	Rangers	A	1–2	Troup	10,000
24	31 December	Clyde	A	1–3	Bird	
25	2 January	Aberdeen	H	1–0	Bird	22,000
26	3 January	Hibernian	H	0–0		15,000
27	7 January	Partick Thistle	A	1–4	McLean	
28	14 January	Greenock Morton	H	2–1	Halliday (2)	
29	21 January	Queen's Park	A	3–0	Halliday (3)	
30	4 February	St Mirren	H	2–2	Halliday (2)	
31	15 February	Kilmarnock	A	3–5	Bird (2), Ross	
32	18 February	Dumbarton	H	2–0	Halliday, Ross	15,000
33	1 March	Partick Thistle	H	0–0		
34	4 March	Albion Rovers	A	0–1		
35	11 March	Third Lanark	A	0–1		
36	18 March	Heart of Midlothian	H	2–0	Halliday (2)	12,000
37	25 March	Hamilton Academical	A	2–1	Halliday, McLean	
38	8 April	Celtic	A	0–4		9,000
39	15 April	Falkirk	H	3–0	Halliday (3)	
40	19 April	Raith Rovers	H	1–0	Cowan	
41	22 April	Clydebank	H	1–1	Cowan	
42	29 April	Ayr United	A	2–0	Halliday, Bird	

=== League table ===
Pos	Team	Pld	W	D	L	GF	GA	GD	Pts
2	Rangers	42	28	10	4	83	26	+57	66
3	Raith Rovers	42	19	13	10	66	43	+23	51
4	Dundee	42	19	11	12	57	40	+17	49
5	Falkirk	42	16	17	9	48	38	+10	49
6	Partick Thistle	42	20	8	14	57	53	+4	48

Source: "1921-1922 Division 1 - SPFL Archive". SPFL.

== Scottish Cup ==
Statistics provided by Dee Archive.

Match day	Date	Opponent	H/A	Score	Dundee scorer(s)	Attendance
1st round	28 January	Stenhousemuir	A	2–0	Halliday, McDonald	
2nd round	11 February	Royal Albert	A	1–0	Halliday	
3rd round	25 February	Aberdeen	A	0–3		

== Player statistics ==
Statistics provided by Dee Archive

No.	Pos	Nat	Player	Total		First Division		Scottish Cup	
No.	Pos	Nat	Player	Apps	Goals	Apps	Goals	Apps	Goals
	DF	(Scotland) SCO	George Aimer	13	0	13	0	0	0
	FW	(Scotland) SCO	John Bell	17	3	17	3	0	0
	FW	(England) ENG	Walter Bird	38	13	35	13	3	0
	FW	(Scotland) SCO	Willie Cowan	18	3	16	3	2	0
	FW	(Scotland) SCO	Dave Cumming	1	0	1	0	0	0
	DF	(Scotland) SCO	Tom Fleming	2	0	2	0	0	0
	GK	(Scotland) SCO	Willie Fotheringham	45	0	42	0	3	0
	FW	(Scotland) SCO	Davie Halliday	31	25	28	23	3	2
	MF	(Scotland) SCO	Alex Hird	17	0	15	0	2	0
	MF	(Ireland) EIR	Sam Irving	24	0	24	0	0	0
	FW	(Scotland) SCO	John Jackson	23	0	20	0	3	0
	MF	(Scotland) SCO	Jock Johnstone	4	1	4	1	0	0
	FW	(Scotland) SCO	Tom Kilpatrick	11	0	11	0	0	0
	FW	(Scotland) SCO	Hugh Lorimer	8	0	8	0	0	0
	FW	(Scotland) SCO	Dave McDonald	5	1	4	0	1	1
	FW	(Scotland) SCO	Willie McLean	32	7	31	7	1	0
	MF	(Scotland) SCO	Dave Nicol	41	1	39	1	2	0
	DF	(Scotland) SCO	David Raitt	40	0	37	0	3	0
	DF	(Scotland) SCO	Jock Ross	25	2	22	2	3	0
	MF	(Scotland) SCO	George Thompson	13	0	11	0	2	0
	DF	(Scotland) SCO	David Thomson	32	0	29	0	3	0
	FW	(Scotland) SCO	Alec Troup	40	4	38	4	2	0
	MF	(England) ENG	Bob Willis	15	0	15	0	0	0

== See also ==
- List of Dundee F.C. seasons
