= 1925–26 Scottish Cup =

Tournament details
- Country: Scotland

Final positions
- Champions: St Mirren
- Runners-up: Celtic

The 1925–26 Scottish Cup was the 48th staging of Scotland's most prestigious football knockout competition. The tournament began on 23 January 1926 and ended on 10 April 1926. The cup was won by St Mirren, who defeated the previous years cup winners Celtic 2–0 in the final.

== Fixtures & Results ==
=== First round ===
23 January 1926	Aberdeen	8 − 1	St Bernard's

23 January 1926	Albion Rovers	6 − 1	Nithsdale Wanderers

23 January 1926	Arbroath	8 − 0	Berwick Rangers

23 January 1926	Arthurlie	5 - 4	Armadale

23 January 1926	Bathgate	5 − 4	East Stirlingshire

23 January 1926	Brechin City	12 − 1	Thornhill

23 January 1926	Clyde	3 − 0	Dunfermline Athletic

23 January 1926	Cowdenbeath	1 - 2	Hamilton Academical

23 January 1926	Douglas Wanderers	1 − 4	Forfar Athletic

23 January 1926	Dumbarton	1 - 1	Buckie Thistle

20 January 1926	Dundee	2 − 0	Caledonian

23 January 1926	Dundee United	1 − 1	Heart of Midlothian

23 January 1926	Dykehead	1 - 1	Morton

23 January 1926	Falkirk	10 − 0	Breadalbane

23 January 1926	Bo'ness	2 - 1	East Fife

23 January 1926	Hibernian	1 - 1	Broxburn United

23 January 1926	Kilmarnock	0 − 5	Celtic

23 January 1926	King's Park	5 - 2	Peterhead

23 January 1926	Leith Athletic	2 − 0	Civil Service Strollers

23 January 1926	Partick Thistle	3 − 0	Motherwell

23 January 1926	Peebles Rovers	7 - 3	Keith

23 January 1926	Queen of the South	0 − 0	Airdrieonians

23 January 1926	Queen's Park	4 - 2	Clydebank

23 January 1926	Raith Rovers	3 - 1	Ayr United

23 January 1926	Rangers	3 − 0	Lochgelly United

23 January 1926	Royal Albert	0 − 1	Alloa Athletic

23 January 1926	Solway Star	2 - 2	Johnstone

23 January 1926	Stenhousemuir	1 - 1	Vale of Leven

23 January 1926	St Johnstone	6 - 1	Nairn County

23 January 1926	St Mirren	4 − 0	Mid Annandale

23 January 1926	Third Lanark	7 − 0	Moorpark

==== First round replay ====
27 January 1926	Airdrieonians	7 − 0	Queen of the South

26 January 1926	Hibernian	1 − 0	Broxburn United

27 January 1926	Buckie Thistle	1 - 2	Dumbarton

6 February 1926	Heart of Midlothian	1 - 1	Dundee United

26 January 1926	Johnstone	0 − 3	Solway Star

27 January 1926	Morton	4 − 1	Dykehead

27 January 1926	Vale of Leven	1 − 2	Stenhousemuir

==== Second First round replay ====
1 February 1926	Heart of Midlothian	6 − 0	Dundee United

=== Second round ===
6 February 1926	Aberdeen	0 − 0	Dundee

6 February 1926	Albion Rovers	1 − 1	Peebles Rovers

6 February 1926	Arbroath	0 − 0	St Mirren

6 February 1926	Arthurlie	2 − 2	Clyde

6 February 1926	Celtic	4 − 0	Melville United

6 February 1926	Falkirk	5 - 1	Montrose

6 February 1926	Bo'ness	1 - 1	Bathgate

6 February 1926	Forfar Athletic	2 - 2	Dumbarton

6 February 1926	Heart of Midlothian	5 − 2	Alloa Athletic

6 February 1926	Hibernian	2 − 3	Airdrieonians

6 February 1926	Morton	3 - 1	Raith Rovers

6 February 1926	Partick Thistle	4 − 1	King's Park

6 February 1926	Rangers	1 − 0	Stenhousemuir

6 February 1926	Solway Star	0 − 3	Brechin City

6 February 1926	St Johnstone	7 − 2	Queen's Park

6 February 1926	Third Lanark	6 − 1	Leith Athletic

==== Second round replay ====
10 February 1926	Bathgate	3 − 1	Bo'ness

9 February 1926	Clyde	1 − 0	Arthurlie

10 February 1926	Dumbarton	4 − 1	Forfar Athletic

10 February 1926	Dundee	0 − 3	Aberdeen

10 February 1926	Peebles Rovers	0 − 4	Albion Rovers

9 February 1926	St Mirren	3 − 0	Arbroath

=== Third round ===
20 February 1926	Aberdeen	2 − 2	St Johnstone

20 February 1926	Bathgate	2 − 5	Airdrieonians

20 February 1926	Dumbarton	3 − 0	Clyde

20 February 1926	Falkirk	0 − 2	Rangers

20 February 1926	Heart of Midlothian	0 − 4	Celtic

20 February 1926	Morton	1 − 0	Albion Rovers

20 February 1926	St Mirren	2 − 1	Partick Thistle

20 February 1926	Third Lanark	4 − 0	Brechin City

==== Third round replay ====
24 February 1926	St Johnstone	0 − 0	Aberdeen

==== Second Third round replay ====
1 March 1926	Aberdeen	1 − 0	St Johnstone

=== Quarter-finals ===
6 March 1926	Celtic	6–1	Dumbarton

6 March 1926	Morton	0–4	Rangers

6 March 1926	St Mirren	2–0	Airdrieonians

6 March 1926	Third Lanark	1–1	Aberdeen

==== Quarter-final replay ====
10 March 1926	Aberdeen	3 - 0	Third Lanark	Pittodrie Stadium, Aberdeen
15:45	Doolan (o.g.); Smith	Report		Attendance: 11,591; Referee: Small

=== Semi-finals ===
20 March 1926	Celtic	2 − 1	Aberdeen	Tynecastle, Edinburgh
	McInally; Jimmy McGrory	Report	Hutton (pen.)	Attendance: 23,000

20 March 1926	St Mirren	1 − 0	Rangers	Celtic Park, Glasgow
	Thomson			Attendance: 61,000

== Final ==
10 April 1926

St Mirren	2–0	Celtic
McCrae; Howieson	Report

Hampden Park, Glasgow
Attendance: 98,620

=== Teams ===
Celtic:
GK	Peter Shevlin
RB	Willie McStay
LB	Hugh Hilley
RH	Peter Wilson
CH	Jimmy McStay
LH	John McFarlane
OR	Paddy Connolly
IR	Alec Thomson
CF	Jimmy McGrory
IL	Tommy McInally
OL	Willie Leitch

St Mirren:
GK	Jock Bradford
RB	Andrew Findlay
LB	Willie Newbiggin
RH	Tom Morrison
CH	Willie Summers
LH	William McDonald
OR	Mattha Morgan
IR	Allan Gebbie
CF	David McCrae
IL	Jimmy Howieson
OL	Jamie Thomson

== See also ==
- 1925–26 in Scottish football
