= David Robb (disambiguation) =

David Robb (born 1947) is a Scottish actor.

David Robb may also refer to:

- David Robb (footballer) (1903–1992), Scottish association football player
- Davie Robb (born 1947), Scottish association football player
- David Robb (motorcycling) (born 1956), American motorcycle designer
