= Finlay Brown =

Finlay Brown may refer to:

- Finlay Brown (footballer) (1902–1977), Scottish footballer
- Finlay Brown (rugby union), Scottish rugby union referee
