= Harry McGregor =

Harry McGregor or MacGregor may refer to:

- J. Harry McGregor (1896–1958), member of the U.S. House of Representatives from Ohio
- Harry McGregor (footballer), Scottish football goalkeeper
- Harry MacGregor, a character in the film Father Goose
