= 1916–17 in Scottish football =

Football in Scotland
- Season: 1916–17

1916–17 in Scottish football

Division One champions
- Celtic

Junior Cup winners
- St Mirren Juniors

The 1916–17 season was the 44th season of competitive football in Scotland and the 27th season of the Scottish Football League.

== League competitions ==
=== Scottish Football League ===
Pos	Team	Pld	W	D	L	GF	GA	GD	Pts
1	Celtic (C)	38	27	10	1	79	17	+62	64
2	Morton	38	24	6	8	72	39	+33	54
3	Rangers	38	24	5	9	68	32	+36	53
4	Airdrieonians	38	21	8	9	71	38	+33	50
5	Third Lanark	38	19	11	8	53	37	+16	49
6	Kilmarnock	38	18	7	13	69	46	+23	43
7	St Mirren	38	15	10	13	49	43	+6	40
8	Motherwell	38	16	6	16	57	59	−2	38
9	Dumbarton	38	12	11	15	56	73	−17	35
9	Partick Thistle	38	14	7	17	44	43	+1	35
9	Hamilton Academical	38	13	9	16	54	73	−19	35
12	Clyde	38	10	14	14	41	53	−12	34
12	Falkirk	38	12	10	16	58	57	+1	34
14	Heart of Midlothian	38	14	4	20	44	59	−15	32
15	Ayr United	38	12	7	19	47	59	−12	31
16	Dundee	38	13	4	21	58	71	−13	30
16	Hibernian	38	10	10	18	57	72	−15	30
18	Queen's Park	38	11	7	20	56	81	−25	29
19	Raith Rovers	38	8	7	23	42	91	−49	23
20	Aberdeen	38	7	7	24	36	68	−32	21

Source: "1916-1917 SFL - SPFL Archive". SPFL.
(C) Champions

Champions: Celtic

Note: Due to increasing travel difficulties under war-time conditions, Aberdeen, Dundee and Raith Rovers were asked to retire from the League at the end of the season. Clydebank were elected to maintain an even number of teams.

== Other honours ==
=== Cup honours ===
==== National ====
Competition (Note: The Scottish Cup, Scottish Qualifying Cup (except 1914–15 and 1918–19), and Scottish Amateur Cup were not held during WWI years.)	Winner	Score	Runner-up
Scottish Junior Cup	St Mirren Juniors	1 – 0	Renfrew

==== County ====
Competition (Note: The Border Cup, North of Scotland Cup, and Perthshire Cup were not held during WWI years. The Aberdeenshire Cup, Ayrshire Cup, Forfarshire Cup, Stirlingshire Cup, and Southern Counties Cup were not held either after 1914–15.) (Note: The East of Scotland Shield and Renfrewshire Cup were not held this season.)	Winner	Score	Runner-up
Dumbartonshire Cup	Clydebank	1 – 0	Dumbarton Harp
Fife Cup	Cowdenbeath	0 – 0 (Note: Won on corners.)	East Fife
Glasgow Cup	Celtic	3 – 2	Clyde
Lanarkshire Cup	Wishaw Thistle	2 – 1	Dykehead
Linlithgowshire Cup	Armadale	2 – 1	Broxburn

=== Non-league honours ===
Senior Leagues

Division	Winner
Eastern League	Cowdenbeath
Western League	Clydebank

== Scotland national team ==
There were no Scotland matches played with the British Home Championship suspended due to World War I.

== See also ==
- 1916–17 Aberdeen F.C. season
- 1916–17 Rangers F.C. season
- Association football during World War I
