= Hilley =

Hilley is a surname. Notable people with the surname include:

- Audrey Marie Hilley (1933–1987), American murderer
- Dave Hilley (born 1938), Scottish footballer
- Ed Hilley (1879–1956), American baseball player
- Hugh Hilley (1899–1987), Scottish footballer
- Joe Hilley (born 1956), American author
