= Walter Bird =

Walter Bird may refer to:

- Walter Bird (cricketer) (1854–1921), British cricketer
- Walter James Bird (1863–1953), English organ-builder
- Walter Bird (footballer) (1891–1965), British footballer
- Walter Bird (photographer) (1903–1969), British photographer
- Walter Bird, founder of the American company Birdair in 1957

== See also ==
- Walter Burd (1888–1939), Anglican bishop
- Walter Byrd (born 1942), American basketball player
