= 1926–27 Scottish Cup =

Tournament details
- Country: Scotland

Final positions
- Champions: Celtic
- Runners-up: East Fife

The 1926–27 Scottish Cup was the 49th season of Scotland's most prestigious football knockout competition. The Cup was won by Celtic who defeated East Fife in the final at Hampden Park.

== Fourth round ==
Team One	Team Two	Score
Bo'ness	Celtic	2-5
Falkirk	Rangers	2-2 1-0
Arthurlie	East Fife	0-3
Partick Thistle	Dundee United	5-0 2-0

== Semi-finals ==
26 March 1927

Celtic	1–0	Falkirk

Attendance: 73,000

26 March 1927

East Fife	2–1	Partick Thistle

Attendance: 40,000

== Final ==
16 April 1927

Celtic	3–1	East Fife
Connolly; McLean; Robertson (o.g.)		Wood

Hampden Park, Glasgow
Attendance: 80,070

=== Teams ===
Celtic
GK	John Thomson
RB	Willie McStay
LB	Hugh Hilley
RH	Peter Wilson
CH	Jimmy McStay
LH	John McFarlane
OR	Paddy Connolly
IR	Alec Thomson
CF	Tommy McInally
IL	John McMenemy
OL	Adam McLean

East Fife:
GK	Jock Gilfillan
RB	Stewart Robertson
LB	William Gillespie
RH	James Hope
CH	Jimmy Brown
LH	Bobby Russell
OR	Phil Weir
IR	George Paterson
CF	Jock Wood
IL	Peter Barrett
OL	Dave Edgar

== See also ==
- 1926–27 in Scottish football
