= 1925–26 Rangers F.C. season =

Rangers
1925–26 season
- Chairman: Joseph Buchanan
- Manager: Bill Struth
- Ground: Ibrox Park
- Scottish League Division One: 6th P38 W19 D6 L13 F79 A55 Pts44
- Scottish Cup: Fourth round

The 1925–26 season was the 52nd season of competitive football by Rangers.

== Overview ==
It was and still is their worst-ever top-tier league finish.

== Results ==
All results are written with Rangers' score first.

=== Scottish League Division One ===
Date	Opponent	Venue	Result	Attendance	Scorers
15 August 1925	St Johnstone	A	3–0	15,879	
22 August 1925	Motherwell	H	1–0	25,000	
29 August 1925	Morton	H	4–1	15,000	
5 September 1925	Airdrieonians	A	1–2	24,992	
12 September 1925	Aberdeen	A	1–3	26,000	
19 September 1925	St Mirren	H	4–1	40,000	
21 September 1925	Hibernian	A	2–0	15,000	
26 September 1925	Heart of Midlothian	A	0–3	32,000	
3 October 1925	Kilmarnock	H	3–0	20,000	
10 October 1925	Partick Thistle	A	0–2	35,000	
17 October 1925	Celtic	H	1–0	45,000	
24 October 1925	Dundee	H	1–2	12,000	
31 October 1925	Raith Rovers	A	0–1	7,000	
7 November 1925	Queen's Park	A	6–3	35,000	
14 November 1925	Cowdenbeath	H	3–0	14,000	
25 November 1925	Motherwell	A	3–1	8,000	
28 November 1925	Falkirk	H	2–3	16,000	
5 December 1925	Kilmarnock	A	2–2	10,000	
12 December 1925	Hibernian	H	3–1	22,000	
19 December 1925	Dundee United	A	1–2	12,000	
26 December 1925	St Johnstone	H	0–1	7,500	
1 January 1926	Celtic	A	2–2	57,000	
2 January 1926	Partick Thistle	H	2–1	20,000	
4 January 1926	Clydebank	H	3–1	15,000	
9 January 1926	Hamilton Academical	A	3–3	12,000	
16 January 1926	Heart of Midlothian	H	2–2	25,000	
30 January 1926	Cowdenbeath	A	3–2	8,000	
10 February 1926	Airdrieonians	H	1–2	12,000	
13 February 1926	Raith Rovers	H	4–2	15,000	
24 February 1926	Falkirk	A	1–1	5,000	
27 February 1926	Dundee	A	5–1	14,000	
10 March 1926	Queen's Park	H	1–2	6,000	
23 March 1926	St Mirren	A	2–3	6,000	
27 March 1926	Aberdeen	H	0–1	12,000	
3 April 1926	Morton	A	3–1	8,000	
5 April 1926	Dundee United	H	2–1	7,000	
10 April 1926	Clydebank	A	2–2	6,000	
24 April 1926	Hamilton Academical	H	2–0	6,000	

=== Scottish Cup ===
Date	Round	Opponent	Venue	Result	Attendance	Scorers
23 January 1926	R1	Lochgelly United	H	3–0	5,700	
6 February 1926	R2	Stenhousemuir	H	1–0	14,000	
20 February 1926	R3	Falkirk	A	2–0	21,572	
6 March 1926	R4	Morton	A	4–0	15,000	
20 March 1926	SF	St Mirren	N	0–1	61,039	

== See also ==
- 1925–26 in Scottish football
- 1925–26 Scottish Cup
