= James Thomson (footballer, fl. 1912–1928) =

Scottish footballer

Personal information
- Place of birth: Dumbarton, Scotland
- Height: 5 ft 9 in (1.75 m)
- Position: Outside left

Senior career*
Years	Team	Apps	(Gls)
- Clydebank Juniors
1912–1913	Renton		
1913–1914	Manchester United	6	(1)
1914–1915	Dumbarton Harp		
1916–1917	Clyde	25	(6)
1917–1928	St Mirren	345	(79)
1920	→ Dumbarton (loan)		
- * Club domestic league appearances and goals

James Thomson (born in Dumbarton) was a Scottish professional footballer who played as an outside left. During his career, he played for a number of clubs, including short spells at Clydebank Juniors, Renton, Manchester United, Dumbarton Harp and Clyde, followed by 11 years with St Mirren.

During his time at Manchester United, he made six appearances, scoring one goal, during the 1913–14 Football League season. He was part of the St Mirren team which won the Scottish Cup in 1926, beating Celtic (he had scored the winning goal in their semi-final victory over Rangers).
