= 1925 Scottish Cup final =

1925 Scottish Cup Final
- Event: 1924–25 Scottish Cup
Celtic	Dundee
2	1
- Date: 11 April 1925
- Venue: Hampden Park, Glasgow
- Referee: T. Dougray
- Attendance: 75,317

The 1925 Scottish Cup Final was the 47th final of the Scottish Cup. The match took place at Hampden Park in Glasgow on 11 April 1925. The match was contested by Celtic and Dundee, with Celtic winning 2–1 for their eleventh success in the tournament and seeing them overtake Queens Park as the most successful club in the cup. The game is best remembered for Patsy Gallacher's equalising goal for Celtic, where he somersaulted over the goalkeeper into the goal with the ball between his feet.

== Match details ==
=== Report ===
Dundee dominated the early stages of the game. They ably defended against Celtic's forwards, whilst their own attackers repeatedly threatened the Celtic goal. Dundee took the lead after 30 minutes when David McLean scored with a fine shot. The rest of the first half saw the game fluctuate, with both goalkeepers kept busy. However, both sets of defenders restricted their opponents to long range shots.

The second half saw Celtic constantly pushing forward for an equaliser, but were repeatedly thwarted by Dundee goalkeeper Jock Britton. The Dundee attack was largely nullified due to Celtic's pressure in attack. Celtic eventually equalised on 81 minutes: Peter Wilson passed to Patsy Gallacher, who dribbled past several Dundee defenders. Close to goal, Gallacher was tackled and fell, but he gripped the ball in between his feet and somersaulted into the goal - tangling himself in the goalnet in the process.

Dundee's confidence was visibly shaken after that, with Britton time-wasting at taking goal-kicks, and virtually every outfield player now acting as a defender. On 86 minutes, Celtic scored what proved to be the winning goal. John McFarlane took a free kick, sending it towards goal, and Jimmy McGrory headed it in to put Celtic 2-1 ahead.

=== Details ===
11 April 1925

Celtic	2 – 1	Dundee
Gallacher 81'; McGrory 86'		McLean 30'

Hampden Park, Glasgow
Attendance: 75,317
Referee: T. Dougray

Celtic:
GK	Peter Shevlin
RB	Willie McStay
LB	Hugh Hilley
RH	Peter Wilson
CH	Jimmy McStay
LH	John McFarlane
OR	Paddy Connolly
IR	Patsy Gallacher
CF	Jimmy McGrory
IL	Alec Thomson
OL	Adam McLean
Manager:
Willie Maley

Dundee:
GK	Jock Britton
RB	Finlay Brown
LB	Napper Thomson
RH	Jock Ross
CH	Willie Rankin
LH	Sam Irving
OR	Charlie Duncan
IR	Dave McLean
CF	Dave Halliday
IL	Johnnie Rankin
OL	Jock Gilmour
Manager:
Sandy MacFarlane
