= 1916–17 Rangers F.C. season =

Rangers
1916–17 season
- Chairman: John Ure Primrose
- Manager: William Wilton
- Ground: Ibrox Park
- Scottish League: 3rd P38 W24 D5 L9 F68 A32 Pts53
- Top goalscorer: League: Charlie Duncan (15); All: Charlie Duncan (15)

The 1916–17 season was the 43rd season of competitive football by Rangers.

== Overview ==
Rangers played a total of 41 competitive matches during the 1916–17 season. They finished third in the Scottish League after winning 24 of the 38 league matches and collecting a total of 53 points (11 behind league winners Celtic).

The Scottish Cup was not competed for this season, as the Scottish Football Association had withdrawn the tournament due to the outbreak of the First World War.

== Results ==
All results are written with Rangers' score first.

=== Scottish League Division One ===
| Date | Opponent | Venue | Result | Attendance | Scorers |
|---|---|---|---|---|---|
| 19 August 1916 | Dundee | H | 3–0 | 12,000 | C.Duncan (2), S.Duncan |
| 26 August 1916 | Heart of Midlothian | A | 3–1 | 10,500 | Cairns, S.Duncan, Archibald |
| 2 September 1916 | Dumbarton | H | 6–0 | 10,000 | C.Duncan (3), Logan, Cairns, S.Duncan (pen.) |
| 16 September 1916 | Kilmarnock | H | 3–0 | 10,000 | S.Duncan (2, 1 pen.), C.Duncan |
| 30 September 1916 | St Mirren | H | 1–0 | 12,000 | Cairns |
| 7 October 1916 | Ayr United | A | 3–1 | 6,000 | Paterson (2), S.Duncan |
| 14 October 1916 | Motherwell | H | 2–1 | 5,000 | Cairns (2) |
| 21 October 1916 | Third Lanark | A | 1–1 | 30,000 | Paterson |
| 28 October 1916 | Celtic | A | 0–0 | 40,000 | |
| 4 November 1916 | Greenock Morton | H | 0–1 | 30,000 | |
| 11 November 1916 | Hibernian | A | 0–0 | 10,000 | |
| 18 November 1916 | Clyde | H | 1–0 | 8,000 | S.Duncan |
| 25 November 1916 | Raith Rovers | A | 4–1 | 5,000 | Archibald (2), Riddell, Bennett |
| 2 December 1916 | Falkirk | H | 3–1 | 7,000 | S.Duncan (2), Cairns |
| 9 December 1916 | Airdrieonians | A | 0–2 | 8,000 | |
| 16 December 1916 | Hibernian | H | 5–1 | 10,000 | Martin (2), Manderson, C.Duncan, Dornan (o.g.) |
| 23 December 1916 | Motherwell | A | 1–2 | 8,000 | Blair (pen.) |
| 30 December 1916 | Airdrieonians | H | 3–0 | 12,000 | C Duncan (2), Lawson |
| 1 January 1917 | Celtic | H | 0–0 | 50,000 | |
| 2 January 1917 | Partick Thistle | A | 1–0 | 12,000 | Martin |
| 6 January 1917 | Heart of Midlothian | H | 1–0 | 12,000 | Martin |
| 13 January 1917 | Clyde | A | 1–0 | 15,000 | Riddell |
| 20 January 1917 | Partick Thistle | H | 3–0 | 10,000 | C.Duncan (2), Riddell |
| 27 January 1917 | Hamilton Academical | H | 2–1 | 8,000 | Blair (pen.), Pursell |
| 3 February 1917 | Aberdeen | A | 1–3 | 6,000 | C.Duncan |
| 10 February 1917 | Ayr United | H | 1–0 | 12,000 | Manderson |
| 17 February 1917 | Dumbarton | A | 3–0 | 5,000 | Bell, Cairns, Croot |
| 24 February 1917 | St Mirren | A | 1–1 | 12,000 | Cairns |
| 3 March 1917 | Aberdeen | H | 1–0 | 8,000 | Gordon |
| 10 March 1917 | Greenock Morton | A | 0–1 | 7,000 | |
| 17 March 1917 | Falkirk | A | 2–0 | 5,000 | Cairns (2) |
| 24 March 1917 | Raith Rovers | H | 4–3 | 5,000 | Livingston (3), Cairns |
| 31 March 1917 | Kilmarnock | A | 1–4 | 5,000 | Cairns |
| 7 April 1917 | Third Lanark | H | 0–2 | 15,000 | |
| 9 April 1917 | Queen's Park | A | 4–1 | 10,000 | C.Duncan (2), Gray, Rutherford |
| 21 April 1917 | Hamilton Academical | A | 1–3 | 7,000 | C.Duncan |
| 21 April 1917 | Queen's Park | H | 1–0 | 7,000 | Harris |
| 28 April 1917 | Dundee | A | 1–2 | 9,000 | Blair (pen.) |

== Appearances ==
| Player | Position | Appearances | Goals |
|---|---|---|---|
| (England) Herbert Lock | GK | 18 | 0 |
| (Ireland) Bert Manderson | DF | 41 | 2 |
| (Scotland) Jimmy Blair | DF | 37 | 3 |
| (Scotland) James Logan | DF | 14 | 1 |
| (Scotland) Harold McKenna | MF | 26 | 0 |
| (Scotland) Scott Duncan | MF | 30 | 9 |
| (Scotland) Dick Bell | MF | 15 | 1 |
| (Scotland) Charlie Duncan | FW | 26 | 15 |
| (Scotland) Tommy Cairns | FW | 27 | 14 |
| (Scotland) Bobby Archibald | FW | 14 | 3 |
| (Scotland) James Riddell | DF | 25 | 3 |
| (Scotland) Hector Lawson | MF | 26 | 1 |
| (Scotland) George Philip | FW | 2 | 0 |
| (Scotland) Bill Paterson | FW | 5 | 3 |
| (Scotland) John Hempsey | GK | 22 | 0 |
| (Scotland) George Law | DF | 4 | 0 |
| (Scotland) Alec Bennett | MF | 7 | 1 |
| (Scotland) James Bowie | MF | 21 | 0 |
| (Scotland) James Martin | MF | 22 | 4 |
| (Scotland) William Hamilton | GK | 1 | 0 |
| (Scotland) Joe Hendry | MF | 6 | 0 |
| (Scotland) Jimmy Gordon | DF | 7 | 1 |
| (Scotland) Fred Crook | MF | 9 | 1 |
| (Scotland) Andrew Livingstone | FW | 5 | 3 |
| (Scotland) Fred Gray | MF | 2 | 1 |
| (Scotland) Walter Rutherford | FW | 1 | 1 |
| (Scotland) John Anderson | MF | 2 | 0 |
| (Scotland) Neil Harris | FW | 1 | 1 |
| (Scotland) John Dick | MF | 1 | 0 |
| (Scotland) Sandy Archibald (Note: Appearance in the Glasgow Merchants Charity Cup; one-match loan from Raith Rovers.) | FW | 1 | 0 |
| (Scotland) Alex Lindsay | FW | 1 | 0 |

== See also ==
- 1916–17 in Scottish football
