= Jimmy Howieson =

Scottish footballer (1900–1971)

Personal information
- Date of birth: 7 June 1900
- Place of birth: Rutherglen, Scotland
- Date of death: 28 May 1971 (aged 70)
- Place of death: Glasgow, Scotland
- Position: Inside forward

Senior career*
Years	Team	Apps	(Gls)
1921–1922	Rutherglen Glencairn		
1921–1924	Airdrieonians	66	(20)
1924–1925	St Johnstone	19	(9)
1925	→ St Mirren (loan)	0	(0)
1925	Dundee United	10	(5)
1925–1927	St Mirren	44	(14)
1927–1928	Hull City	39	(7)
1928–1929	New Bedford Whalers	43	(17)
1929	New York Giants	4	(3)
1929–1930	Hull City	28	(5)
1930–1932	Shelbourne		
1932–1934	Clyde	37	(6)
1934–1935	Alloa Athletic		
1934–1935	Glenavon		
1935–1936	Belfast Celtic		

International career
1927	Scotland	1	(0)
- * Club domestic league appearances and goals

James Howieson (7 June 1900 – 28 May 1971) was a Scottish footballer who played as an inside forward for clubs in Scotland, Ireland, England and the United States. He earned one cap with Scotland in 1927.

== Early life ==
Howieson, the son of a Glasgow city centre tavern owner, attended Rutherglen Elementary School and John Street School (Bridgeton). He spent two years as a marine engineer, but an accident led him to enlist in the Royal Navy in 1917. He spent four years as a sailor and took part in organised football for the first time, having previously played on the streets with most of his time spent assisting his father.

== Playing career ==
=== Club ===
In 1921, Howieson purchased his release from the Navy and joined Rutherglen Glencairn. Later that year, he moved to Airdrieonians (they won the Scottish Cup during his time there and he played a part in the run, but was not involved in the final itself). In 1924, he transferred to St Johnstone and appeared in most of the Perth club's league games, but an arrangement was made for him to play for St Mirren in the Paisley team's cup games – however this did not include replays, and in his absence they were eliminated at the third attempt by eventual winners Celtic. At the end of that season, Howieson moved to Dundee United; in October 1925, Dundee United sold his contract to St Mirren for £1,000. He won the 1926 Scottish Cup with St Mirren, scoring the winning goal. In March 1927, St Mirren sent him south to Hull City for £3,200.

A season later, he left the British Isles to join the New Bedford Whalers for the 1928–29 American Soccer League season. That season saw the outbreak of the "Soccer War" between the ASL and the United States Football Association over control of the sport. As part of that dispute, the USFA and FIFA declared the ASL and outlaw league and created a competing league, the Eastern Professional Soccer League. Although the Whalers remained in the ASL for most of the season, it moved to the EPSL in the spring of 1929. Howieson played thirty-five games, scoring nine goals in the ASL, then another eight games, scoring eight goals, in the EPSL. With four games left in the season, the Whalers sent Howieson to the New York Giants for four games.

At the end of the season, Howieson returned to Hull City. In 1930, they sent him to Dublin club Shelbourne for £3,200. He then played for another two teams in Scotland (including boyhood favourites Clyde) and two in Northern Ireland until his career ended in 1936.

=== International ===
On 26 February 1927, Howieson earned his only Scotland cap in a 1–0 victory over Ireland.

== After football ==
Following his retirement, Howieson co-owned the Railway Tavern in Gorbals, Glasgow with his brother.

== Honours ==
St Mirren

- Scottish Cup: 1925–26

Shelbourne

- League of Ireland: 1930–31
