= David McCrae =

Scottish footballer

Personal information
- Date of birth: 23 February 1900
- Place of birth: Bridge of Weir, Scotland
- Date of death: 1976 (aged 75–76)
- Place of death: Kilmacolm, Scotland
- Position: Striker

Youth career
- Kilmacolm Amateurs

Senior career*
Years	Team	Apps	(Gls)
1923–1924	Beith	8	(5)
1924–1934	St Mirren	319	(222)
1934	New Brighton		(2)
1934–1935	Queen of the South	6	(2)
1935–1936	Darlington		
Total		325	(231)

International career
1929	Scotland	2	(0)
- * Club domestic league appearances and goals

David McCrae (23 February 1900 – 1976) was a Scottish footballer who played at both professional and international levels as a striker.

After being signed after an impressive Scottish Cup performance as an opposition player with Beith, McCrae played club football for St Mirren, where he was all-time top scorer with 222 league goals and 251 in all competitions and won the Scottish Cup in 1926, scoring in the final. McCrae later played club football for New Brighton, Queen of the South and Darlington.

While at St Mirren, McCrae also earned two caps for Scotland in 1929. His brother was fellow player James McCrae.

== See also ==
- List of footballers in Scotland by number of league goals (200+)
- List of Scottish football families

== Sources ==
- Smith, Paul (2013). Scotland Who's Who. Pitch Publishing. ISBN 9781909178847.
