= Hugh Lorimer =

Scottish footballer

Personal information
- Full name: Hugh Harper Lorimer
- Date of birth: 11 November 1896
- Place of birth: Paisley, Scotland
- Date of death: 1 July 1939 (aged 42)
- Place of death: Youngstown, Ohio, USA
- Position: Outside right

Youth career
- St Mirren Juniors

Senior career*
Years	Team	Apps	(Gls)
1919–1921	Tottenham Hotspur	5	(0)
- Dundee
- Boston Soccer Club
- J&P Coats
- * Club domestic league appearances and goals

Hugh Harper Lorimer (11 November 1896 – 1 July 1939) was a Scottish footballer who played for St Mirren Juniors, Tottenham Hotspur, Dundee, Boston Soccer Club and J&P Coats.

== Football career ==
Harper played for St Mirren Juniors before joining Tottenham Hotspur in 1919. The outside right played a total of five matches for the Spurs between 1919 and 1921. After leaving White Hart Lane, he had a spell at Dundee before joining the American Soccer League club Boston Soccer Club (dubbed the "Wonder Workers") and later J&P Coats in 1925–26.

== Death ==
Harper was killed in an automobile accident in Youngstown, Ohio, aged 42.
