= David Cumming (footballer, born 1900) =

Scottish footballer

Personal information
- Full name: David Douglas Cumming
- Date of birth: 1900
- Place of birth: Glasgow, Scotland
- Height: 5 ft 9 in (1.75 m)
- Position: Winger

Senior career*
| Years | Team | Apps | (Gls) |
| 1921–1922 | Dundee | | |
| 1922–1923 | Grimsby Town | 6 | (0) |
- * Club domestic league appearances and goals

David Douglas Cumming (1900 – after 1922) was a Scottish professional footballer who played as a winger.
