= Harry McGregor (footballer) =

Scottish footballer

Personal information
- Full name: Harry McGregor
- Place of birth: Scotland
- Date of death: 1960s
- Place of death: Scotland
- Position: Goalkeeper

Senior career*
Years	Team	Apps	(Gls)
1924	Dundee	3	
–1928	East Stirlingshire		(0)
1928–1930	Dundee United	43	
1930–	Alloa Athletic		
- * Club domestic league appearances and goals

Harry McGregor was a Scottish professional footballer who played as a goalkeeper. After a brief stint with Dundee in 1924, McGregor was playing for East Stirlingshire before signing for Dundee United after showing up well in a public trial in August 1928. He made his debut at the beginning of September 1928, displacing Jock McHugh between the posts. He became the first choice keeper for the rest of the season and helped the side to promotion, winning the Scottish Second Division championship. During the First Division campaign that followed, McGregor became the understudy to McHugh until the end of the season and was released in April 1930, joining Alloa Athletic. McGregor died in the early 1960s.

== Honours ==
=== Dundee United ===
- Scottish Second Division: 1

1928–29
