= Alf Agar =

English footballer

Personal information
- Date of birth: 28 August 1904
- Place of birth: Esh Winning, County Durham, England
- Date of death: March 1989 (age 84)
- Place of death: Carlisle, Cumbria, England
- Height: 5 ft 8 in (1.73 m)
- Position: Outside right

Senior career*
Years	Team	Apps	(Gls)
–	Esh Winning		
–	Shildon		
–	West Stanley		
–	Dundee		
1927–1928	Barrow	31	(7)
1928–1930	Carlisle United	49	(11)
1930–1932	Accrington Stanley	73	(27)
1932–1936	Oldham Athletic	96	(28)
1936–1937	York City	24	(4)
1937–1939	Scarborough		(42)
- * Club domestic league appearances and goals

Alfred Agar (28 August 1904 – Mar 1989) was an English footballer.

He played for Esh Winning, Shildon, West Stanley, Dundee, Barrow, Carlisle United, Accrington Stanley, Oldham Athletic, York City and Scarborough.

World War II ended his football career. He moved to Carlisle, where he got married and worked as a police officer, then at a power plant. He became a passionate supporter of his old club, Carlisle United, and was a special guest at their 60th anniversary match.
