= St Mirren Juniors F.C. =

Former association football club in Scotland

St Mirren Juniors
- Full name: St Mirren Juniors Football Club
- Nickname: Young Saints
- Founded: 1896
- Dissolved: 1920
- Ground: Love Street
- President: James Fleming (vice-president of the Scottish Football Association)
Home colours

St Mirren Juniors F.C. was a Scottish Junior Football Association football club which won the Scottish Junior Cup in 1917.

== History ==
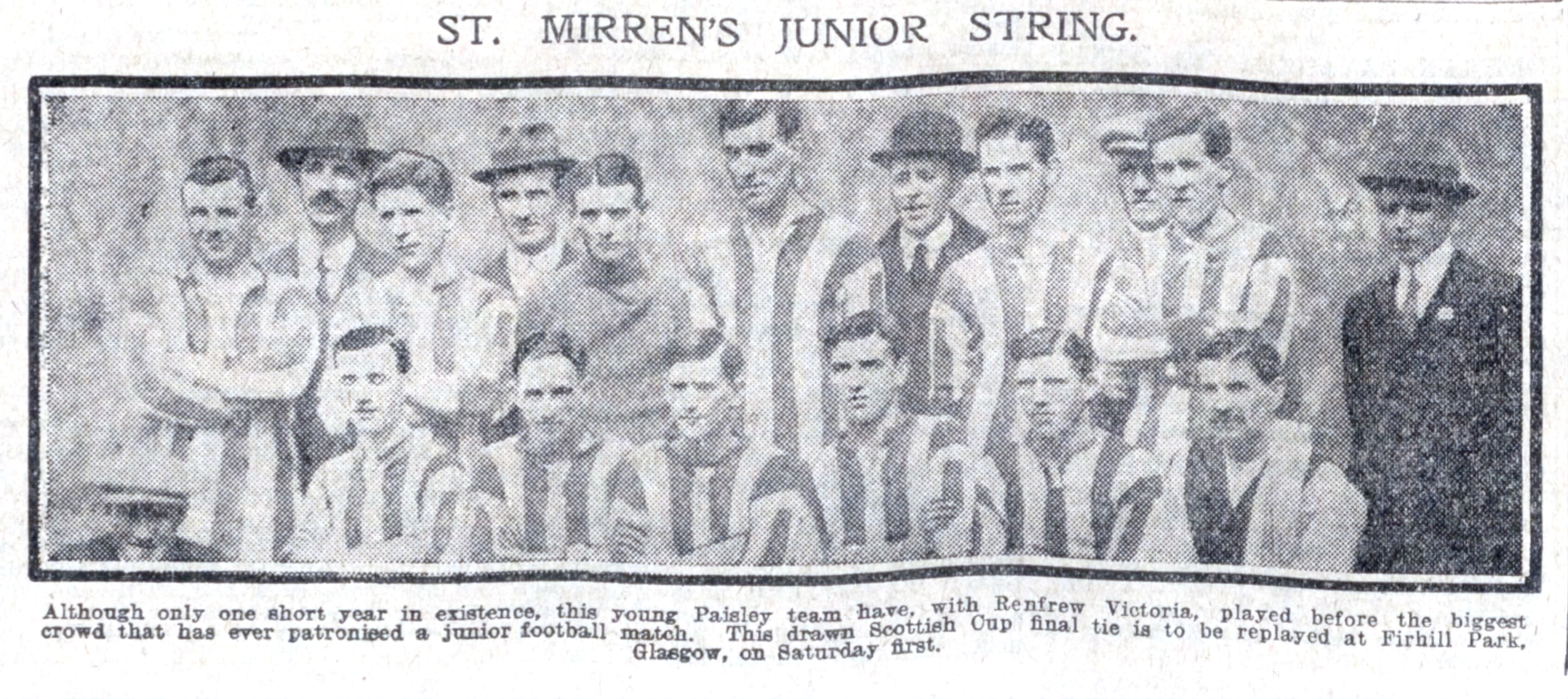
The 1916–17 St Mirren Juniors side, Daily Record, 6 June 1917

The Senior side St Mirren F.C. formed the Juniors by raising the club's Juvenile XI (St Mirren Thistle) to Junior status before the start of the 1896–97 season, as a way to fill the gap at the club's new Love Street ground when the senior side was playing away. St Mirren's existing affiliate Junior side - Westmarch XI - had not followed the Saints to Love Street, but moved instead to Caledonia Park. Although the Westmarch XI continued for the 1896–97 season as affiliated with St Mirren, St Mirren Juniors and Westmarch XI even having fixtures with each other. Westmarch then switched allegiance to Abercorn.

The club reached the Renfrewshire Junior Cup final in 1897–98, but did not re-emerge for the 1898–99 season. The club was re-started in 1912 and successfully applied to join the Scottish Junior League. This attempt lasted only the 1912–13 season, the club finishing 10th out of 12 in the Junior League second division, but the Saints revived the club once more in 1916, applying to join the Glasgow & District Junior League. In the club's first season back, it won the Scottish Junior Cup, bearing Renfrew 1–0 a final replay at Firhill, Durward's winning goal being the only one Renfrew conceded in the competition. Goalkeeper Alec Hart pulled off a late save of such brilliance that the club presented him with a fresh kit as a reward. As at 2025 St Mirren remains the only senior name on the trophy.

The club joined the Glasgow Junior League in 1918–19, finishing 4th and 11th (out of 16 clubs) in the two seasons it completed. In 1918–19, the club won the Renfrewshire Junior Cup, beating Port Glasgow Juniors 3–1 at Love Street, and, in 1919–20, the club was able to have Pollock and Miller from the Senior side re-instated as Juniors to help the club in its league campaign.

Despite this run of success, the parent club seems to have wanted rid of its tenant in 1920, as the club Young Saints sought to take over the tenancy at New Ralston Park for the 1920–21 season, and it resigned from the Glasgow Junior League in July 1920. By March 1922, with no activity having taken place for 2 seasons, the club was confirmed as having "gone into oblivion". The final attempt to re-start the club was in 1923, and, despite gaining the promises of a number of potential players, the effort did not seem to bear any results.

== Colours ==
The club wore the same colours as its parent club, namely black and white stripes.

== Ground ==
The club played at Love Street.

== Notable players ==
A number of players joined the senior side from the Junior, including Cup winners Billy Durward, goalkeeper Alec Hart, Angus Leitch, and John McQuade. Left-half Alec Leslie, part of the Renfrewshire Cup-winning side, stepped up to the Senior side in 1919–20, and played in the 1931 FA Cup final for Birmingham.
