= Joe Nicholls (footballer, born 1905) =

English footballer (1905–1973)

Personal information
- Full name: Joseph Henry Nicholls
- Date of birth: 8 March 1905
- Place of birth: Carlton, England
- Date of death: 20 June 1973 (aged 68)
- Place of death: Nottingham, England
- Height: 6 ft 4 in (1.93 m)
- Position: Goalkeeper

Senior career*
| Years | Team | Apps | (Gls) |
- Darlaston
- Northfleet United
| 1927–1936 | Tottenham Hotspur | 124 | (0) |
| 1936–1939 | Bristol Rovers | 112 | (0) |
- * Club domestic league appearances and goals

Joseph Henry Nicholls (8 March 1905 – 20 June 1973) was a professional footballer who played for teams including Darlaston, Northfleet United, Tottenham Hotspur and Bristol Rovers.

== Football career ==
Nicholls initially trained as a bricklayer, but joined the Grenadier Guards in 1922, where he became the heavyweight boxing champion of his battalion. In 1924 he had a trial with Notts County but without success. He went on to play for Darlaston before joining the Tottenham Hotspur nursery club Northfleet United. The goalkeeper joined the White Hart Lane club in 1927 and featured in 129 matches in all competitions. In 1936 he moved to Bristol Rovers and played a further 112 games by 1939.
