= John McHugh (footballer, born 1909) =

Scottish footballer

Jock McHugh
Personal information
- Full name: John McHugh
- Date of birth: 13 August 1909
- Place of birth: Hamilton, South Lanarkshire, Scotland
- Date of death: 9 October 1966 (aged 57)
- Place of death: Bushey, Hertfordshire, England
- Height: 6 ft 0 in (1.83 m)
- Position: Goalkeeper

Senior career*
Years	Team	Apps	(Gls)
–1928	Burnbank Athletic		
1928–1930	Dundee United	52	(0)
1929	→ Montrose (loan)		
1930–1933	Portsmouth	3	(0)
1933–1939	Watford	38	(0)
1936	→ Southend United (loan)	0	(0)
- * Club domestic league appearances and goals

John McHugh (13 August 1909 – 9 October 1966) was a Scottish professional footballer who played as a goalkeeper. McGregor was playing for Burnbank Athletic before signing for Dundee United in 1928 following Bill Paterson's transfer to Arsenal. He made his United debut in February 1928, sharing goalkeeping duties with Alex Johnstone during the 1927–28 season. He became the second choice keeper for the 1928–29 season and helped the side to promotion, winning the Scottish Second Division championship, although he also spent time on loan at Montrose. During the First Division campaign that followed, McHugh became first choice again and attracted interest from Portsmouth, signing for the club in November 1930 for a fee of £400. McHugh went on to play for Watford and had a loan spell with Southend United during his time at Vicarage Road.

== Honours ==
Dundee United

- Scottish Second Division: 1

1928–29
