= John McFarlane (footballer, born 1899) =

Scottish footballer

Personal information
- Date of birth: 24 November 1899
- Place of birth: Bathgate, Scotland
- Date of death: 25 February 1956 (aged 56)
- Place of death: Scotland
- Position: Left half

Senior career*
Years	Team	Apps	(Gls)
1917–1918	Denbeath Star		
1918–1919	Wellesley Juniors		
1919–1929	Celtic	268	(12)
1929–1933	Middlesbrough		
1933–1934	Shelbourne		
1934–1935	Dunfermline Athletic	26	(0)

International career
1924–1928	Scottish League XI	4	(0)
- * Club domestic league appearances and goals

John "Jean" McFarlane (24 November 1899 – 25 February 1956) was a Scottish footballer who played for Celtic, Middlesbrough and Dunfermline Athletic as a half back.

He made over 300 appearances for Celtic in a decade as a first team player at the club, winning five major honours: two Scottish Football League championships (1921–22 and 1925–26) and three Scottish Cups (1923, 1925 and 1927).

McFarlane was selected four times for the Scottish Football League XI and played in an international trial match in 1924 but never gained a full cap for Scotland, one of few players to appear so often for the SFL team without playing at least once for the SFA.

His nephew Willie Fagan was also a footballer who played for Celtic and won the English Football League title with Liverpool.
