= Patrick Connolly (footballer, born 1901) =

Scottish footballer

Paddy Connolly
Personal information
- Date of birth: 14 April 1901
- Place of birth: Hamilton, Scotland
- Date of death: 18 February 1969 (aged 67)
- Place of death: East Kilbride, Scotland
- Position: Outside right

Senior career*
Years	Team	Apps	(Gls)
- Kirkintilloch Rob Roy
1921–1933	Celtic	259	(40)
1924	→ Third Lanark (loan)	0	(0)
1930–1931	→ Shelbourne (loan)		
1931–1932	→ Morton (loan)	13	(0)
1933	→ Armadale (loan)		
1933	Hibernian	9	(8)
1933–1934	Airdrieonians		
1934–1935	Bo'ness		

International career
1926	Scottish League XI	1	(0)
- * Club domestic league appearances and goals

Patrick Connolly (14 April 1901 – 18 February 1969) was a Scottish footballer who played as an outside right, primarily for Celtic where his role was as a provider of crosses for prolific goalscorer Jimmy McGrory. He made over 300 total appearances for the Glasgow club, winning the Scottish Football League title in 1925–26 as well as playing in five Scottish Cup finals (three victories in 1923, 1925, 1927 in which he scored and set up the other two goals; two defeats in 1926 and 1928). At the end of the 1920s, Bertie Thomson was signed to replace him, but he was reluctant to leave the club and instead went out on loan several times.

He later spent half a season with Hibernian, helping them to re-gain promotion to the top tier as winners of 1932–33 Scottish Division Two.

Connolly was selected by the Scottish Football League XI once, in 1926.
