= Jock Britton =

Scottish footballer

Personal information
- Full name: John Britton
- Date of birth: 18 March 1900
- Place of birth: Lennoxtown, Scotland
- Date of death: 8 October 1953 (aged 53)
- Place of death: Lennoxtown, Scotland
- Height: 6 ft 0 in (1.83 m)
- Position: Goalkeeper

Senior career*
Years	Team	Apps	(Gls)
- Duntocher Hibs
1920–1924	Albion Rovers	90	(0)
1924–1926	Dundee	68	(0)
1926–1928	Tottenham Hotspur	40	(0)
1928–1931	Celtic	0	(0)
1931–1932	Kirkintilloch Rob Roy		
- * Club domestic league appearances and goals

John Britton (18 March 1900 – 8 October 1953) was a Scottish footballer who played as a goalkeeper for Albion Rovers, Dundee, Tottenham Hotspur and Celtic.

== Football career ==
Born in Lennoxtown, Stirlingshire, Britton had spells with Duntocher Hibs, Albion Rovers and Dundee (playing on the losing side in the 1925 Scottish Cup Final) before joining Tottenham Hotspur in March 1926. Britton appeared in 40 Football League matches for the White Hart Lane club, though had to battle with several rivals (including compatriot Jimmy Smith, Joe Nicholls and Cyril Spiers) for a place in the team.

Released by Tottenham following their relegation in 1927–28 he returned to Scotland and ended his senior career at Celtic, though again he was firmly a backup member of the squad behind John Thomson and John Kelly and never made a first team appearance for the Glasgow club. Finally he went back to the junior level with Kirkintilloch Rob Roy.
