= Joe Cassidy (footballer, born 1896) =

Scottish footballer

Personal information
- Full name: John Joseph Cassidy
- Date of birth: 14 February 1894
- Place of birth: Govan, Scotland
- Date of death: 21 July 1949 (aged 55) (Note: Some sources record him as being born in 1896 and thus making his debut aged 16, but checks have shown him to have been born in 1894.)
- Place of death: Glasgow, Scotland
- Height: 5 ft 7 in (1.70 m)
- Positions: Inside left; centre forward

Senior career*
Years	Team	Apps	(Gls)
1911–1912	Vale of Clyde		
1912–1924	Celtic	188	(92)
1913	→ Abercorn (loan)	1	(0)
1913–1915	→ Ayr United (loan)	50	(4)
1924–1925	Bolton Wanderers	22	(7)
1925–1926	Cardiff City	24	(6)
1926–1928	Dundee	51	(9)
1928–1929	Clyde	14	(9)
1929–1931	Ballymena		
1931–1932	Dundalk	13	(3)
1932	Morton	4	(0)
Total		367	(130)

International career
1921–1923	Scottish Football League XI	3	(1)
1921–1924	Scotland	4	(1)
1930	Irish League XI	3	(0)
- * Club domestic league appearances and goals

John Joseph Cassidy MM (14 February 1894 – 21 July 1949) was a Scottish professional footballer who played as an inside left or centre forward. His career was mainly associated with Celtic – he played for the club between 1912 and 1924, although his football career was interrupted by the First World War, during which he served in the British Army in the Black Watch (Royal Highlanders) 1/7th Fife Battalion and won the Military Medal, which led to him being nicknamed "Trooper Joe". He also played for several other Scottish clubs, in England with Bolton Wanderers, in Wales (albeit in the English Football League) with Cardiff City, and on both sides of the border in Ireland with Ballymena and Dundalk. He represented Scotland four times.

== Club career ==
Cassidy had played junior football for Vale of Clyde before appearing as a trialist for Celtic in a match against Hibernian on 16 October 1912 at the age of 18, being registered under the surname of Smith for the match. His performance impressed enough for the club to offer him a contract the same day and was handed his first-team debut six months later on 15 March 1913, playing in a 1–0 defeat to Motherwell. He featured rarely for Celtic in his first few seasons and instead served loans at several clubs to gain experience (including brief spells at Abercorn, Kilmarnock and Clydebank plus more than a season with Ayr United). Following the outbreak of World War I, Cassidy enlisted in the Black Watch (Royal Highlanders) 1/7th Fife Battalion, and was awarded the Military Medal in November 1918. He came back to Britain soon after and appeared in the first-team for Celtic on 31 December 1918, the day after he returned, in a 1–1 draw with Old Firm rivals Rangers.

He soon established himself as a prolific goalscorer, finishing as the club's top scorer for three consecutive seasons between 1921 and 1924. During the 1922–23 season, Cassidy scored eleven of Celtic's thirteen goals during their 1922–23 Scottish Cup triumph, including a hat-trick against Lochgelly United in the first round and four in the following round against Hurlford. In the final, Celtic defeated Hibernian 1–0, Cassidy scoring the winner to ensure the Bhoys claimed their first Scottish Cup win since 1914. His eleven goals in a single Scottish Cup campaign remains a joint club record, Jimmy McGrory (his understudy and then successor in the squad) having equalled the tally in the 1924–25 season.

He left Celtic in 1924 having made over 200 appearances for the Hoops and scored over 100 goals, joining Bolton Wanderers for a fee of £4,500. During his time there, Cassidy suffered from a severe bout of influenza that caused him to lose 22lbs in weight and resulted in him struggling with his stamina levels for several years. He remained with Bolton for one season before joining Cardiff City in 1925, also spending one year at Ninian Park before returning to Scotland with Dundee in an exchange deal that saw Sam Irving move in the opposite direction (coincidentally Cardiff won the FA Cup the year after Cassidy departed, as had also been the case with Bolton a year earlier). After two seasons with Dundee and one with Clyde, in 1929 Cassidy moved to Ireland, joining Ballymena, helping the club to victory in the 1929 Irish Cup final, defeating Belfast Celtic 2–1. He later joined Dundalk for the 1931–32 season but returned to Scotland in January 1932 with Morton.

== International career ==
Having previously represented a Scottish Football League XI, Cassidy was handed his debut for the Scotland national football team on 12 February 1921 in a 2–1 victory over Wales at Pittodrie Stadium in the 1920–21 British Home Championship. Two weeks later, on 26 February, he scored his first goal for Scotland in a 2–0 victory over Ireland at Windsor Park in Belfast. He did not feature again for the side until March 1923, winning his third cap in a 1–0 victory over Ireland. His fourth and final cap came in February 1924, during a 2–0 defeat to Wales.

=== International goals ===
Results list Scotland's goal tally first.

Goal	Date	Venue	Opponent	Result	Competition
1.	26 February 1921	Windsor Park, Belfast, Ireland	Ireland	2–0	1920–21 British Home Championship

== Personal life ==
Due to his regular changes of clubs during the 1920s, Cassidy's first four children were all born in separate countries of the United Kingdom, Scotland, England, Wales and Northern Ireland. He died in 1949 at the age of 55.

== Honours ==
Celtic

- Scottish Division One: 1918–19, 1921–22
- Scottish Cup: 1922–23
- Glasgow Cup: 1919–20, 1920–21
- Glasgow Merchants Charity Cup: 1920–21, 1923–24

Ballymena

- Irish Cup: 1928–29

Scotland

- British Home Championship: 1920–21
