= Bobby Farrell (footballer) =

Scottish footballer

Personal information
- Full name: Robert Farrell
- Date of birth: 1 January 1906
- Place of birth: Dundee, Scotland
- Date of death: 17 January 1971 (aged 65)
- Place of death: Hove, England
- Height: 5 ft 7 in (1.70 m)
- Position: Outside forward

Senior career*
Years	Team	Apps	(Gls)
192?–1926	Dundee North End		
1926–1928	Dundee	16	(0)
1928–1939	Brighton & Hove Albion	382	(66)
- * Club domestic league appearances and goals

Robert Farrell (1 January 1906 – 17 January 1971) was a Scottish professional footballer who played as an outside forward. He made 16 appearances in the Scottish League for Dundee and 382 in the English Football League for Brighton & Hove Albion.

== Life and career ==
Farrell was born in Dundee. He began his football career with junior club Dundee North End before joining Dundee in 1926. According to the Dundee Courier, he was a "tall, well-built lad" who could "fill any position in the forward line, having played in junior circles on the right and left wings with equal success." He made four Division One appearances in his first season and twelve in his second, but was given a free transfer at the end of the 1927–28 season. Reports of his joining Dundee United proved premature, a trial with English First Division club Portsmouth came to nothing, and in September 1928, Farrell signed for another English club, Brighton & Hove Albion of the Third Division South.

Farrell soon established himself at outside right in Brighton's first team, and continued in place for most of the next ten years. Stan Hurst took over the position during the 1938–39 season, and Farrell retired at the end of that campaign. For much of the 1930s, he had spent his summers as twelfth man and baggage master for Sussex County Cricket Club. He became landlord of a local pub, served in the RAF during the Second World War, and was still in the licensed trade at the time of his death in 1971 at the age of 65.
