= Sam Irving =

Northern Irish footballer-manager

Personal information
- Full name: Samuel Johnstone Irving
- Date of birth: 28 August 1893
- Place of birth: Belfast, Ireland
- Date of death: 12 December 1968 (aged 75)
- Place of death: Dundee, Scotland
- Height: 5 ft 9 in (1.75 m)
- Positions: Right half; inside right

Senior career*
Years	Team	Apps	(Gls)
- Shildon Athletic
- Galashiels United
- Esh Winning
1913–1915	Bristol City	18	(4)
- Blyth Spartans
- Shildon Athletic
1920–1926	Dundee	158	(5)
1926–1928	Cardiff City	47	(3)
1928–1932	Chelsea	89	(5)
1932–1933	Bristol Rovers	21	(1)

International career
1923–1931	Ireland	18	(0)

Managerial career
- 1938–39: Dundee United
- * Club domestic league appearances and goals

Samuel Johnstone Irving (28 August 1893 – 12 December 1968) was an Irish professional footballer and manager. Born In Ireland, he was raised in Scotland before playing football in the North of England. He turned professional in 1913 and played in the Football League for Bristol City before World War I. After the war he returned to non-league in England.

In 1920, Irving joined Scottish Football League side Dundee where he quickly established himself in the first team. He spent six years with the club, making over 150 appearances in all competitions, despite suffering persistent knee injuries for several years. He helped the club to two top four finishes and reach the 1925 Scottish Cup Final where they were defeated by Celtic. He joined Football League First Division side Cardiff City in 1926 in a swap deal with Joe Cassidy. In his first year with the club, he helped them win both the FA Cup, becoming the only team from outside England to win the competition, and the Welsh Cup. He also won the 1927 FA Charity Shield the following year, but fell out of favour midway through the 1927–28 season.

He was sold to Second Division side Chelsea where he gained promotion to the First Division in 1930. He signed for Bristol Rovers in 1932 and spent one season with the side before retiring from playing. At international level, Irving made 18 appearances for Ireland between 1923 and 1931, captaining the side on several occasions. After retiring as a player, he was co-manager of Dundee United for the 1938–39 season.

== Early life ==
Irving was born in Belfast on 28 August 1893 to Henry and Isabella Irving, both of whom were Scottish. The family later moved to Glasgow where Irving was raised. His father worked as a blacksmith. Irving served in the Royal Army Medical Corps during the First World War.

== Club career ==
=== Early career ===
Irving began his playing career in the North-East of England, appearing for non-League clubs Shildon Athletic, Galashiels United and Esh Winning. In 1911, he had an unsuccessful trial with Football League First Division side Newcastle United before eventually being signed to a Football League side with Bristol City in November 1913. After the First World War, Irving had spells playing for Blyth Spartans and with his first club Shildon Athletic before signing for Dundee in 1920.

=== Dundee ===
Irving quickly impressed during the club's pre-season and debuted for the first team on the opening day of the 1920–21 season in a 2–2 draw away at Falkirk on 16 August. He immediately established himself in the first team and scored his first goal for the side on 4 September in a victory over Falkirk. After receiving the ball, he advanced to the penalty area before shooting past the opposition goalkeeper, with the Dundee Evening Telegraph describing it as a "great goal". With the club struggling to fulfill their forward line, Irving moved from his traditional half back role to play as an outside right in November, although it was deemed unsuccessful by the Dundee Courier who noted that his presence was also missed from the half back line. His early season was later disrupted after missing several weeks of the season during the later months of 1920 after sustaining an injury against Airdrieonians. He made his return in December against Hamilton Academical. Irving helped the club to a fourth-placed finish in the 1920–21 Scottish Football League.

At the end of his debut season with Dundee, Irving was appointed captain of the first team. After failing to win their opening two games of the 1921–22 campaign, Irving led his side to victory over Third Lanark after which the Dundee Courier remarked that there was "probably no more popular player" at the club than Irving. These early performances led to him being considered for his first selection for the Ireland national football team, but he was denied a call up due to injury. These persistent problems would disrupt most of the remaining season as he missed several months at the start of 1922 with injuries, before returning in April. Dundee achieved another fourth-place finish during the season.

The following year, Dundee were unable to repeat their top four finishes and fell to seventh place before undertaking a tour of Spain at the end of the campaign. Irving missed the opening of the 1923–24 season due to injury. He returned to the first team in September but suffered further injury problems after playing for Ireland against England in October that saw him rarely feature in the following months. He returned to the first team in late February 1924 against Third Lanark. However, Irving continued to be plagued by knee problems; he was stretchered off in matches against both St Mirren on 30 March and Clydebank on 19 April. Representatives from Burnley had travelled to watch Irving play in the latter match, the final game of the season, and were informed that the recurring problem would require surgery to remove a piece of loose cartilage from the knee to rectify the problem.

Although troubled by injury, Irving was resigned for the following season. However, he began the season as cover for Crawford Letham until the latter was sold to Cowdenbeath in September. Having overcome his injury concerns, Irving remained a first team regular and returned to form. Although Dundee finished in eighth place in the league, their lowest placing since Irving's arrival, the club did reach the 1925 Scottish Cup Final, losing 2–1 against Celtic at Hampden Park. Despite the defeat, Irving was praised for his performance in the match with the Dundee Courier remarking that he had "held the Celts' forwards as in a vice".

Irving started the 1925–26 season in goalscoring form, opening his account for the campaign on the opening day during a 3–0 win over Morton. He added another against local rivals Dundee United a week later, in the first Dundee derby played since United's promotion to the top tier of Scottish football. Irving's side won the match 5–0 with his goal being scored via a deflected shot off a United player. He was awarded a benefit match against Sunderland in April 1926. More than 11,000 people attended the match which raised around £500 for Irving. Dundee ended the season in 10th place. His final appearance for the club came on the opening day of the 1926–27 season when he scored in a 4–1 victory over Heart of Midlothian. In total, he made 183 appearances for Dundee netting 6 goals.

=== Cardiff City ===
In June 1926, after six years with Dundee, Irving signed for Football League First Division side Cardiff City in an exchange deal that led to Joe Cassidy moving to Dundee, with the Scottish club also paying a fee towards the move. Irving had nearly joined Cardiff in February 1924 but the move had collapsed. He made his debut for Cardiff in a goalless draw with Leeds United on 30 August, before scoring his first goal on 9 October in a 3–0 win over Sheffield United. His early months were disrupted by a knee injury sustained after slipping down steps at a team hotel before a game against Bury and an infected finger that caused him to miss several matches in November. Having initially played at half back, he was moved to inside right in February 1927 and remained there for the rest of the campaign. Irving made 27 league appearances, scoring three times as Cardiff finished in 14th place. He also played in all six of the club's matches en route to reaching the 1927 FA Cup Final and was instrumental in his side's 3–2 victory over Chelsea in a sixth round replay, scoring one and assisting Len Davies for another. In the final, Irving started at inside right as Cardiff went on to beat Arsenal 1–0 to become the only side from outside England to win the competition. Two weeks later, Irving scored in the final of the Welsh Cup as Cardiff defeated Rhyl to complete a cup double.

Irving remained a first team regular the following season and played in Cardiff's 2–1 victory over Corinthians in the 1927 FA Charity Shield on 12 October. During a 2–1 defeat against Burnley on 24 December, Irving was hit in the chest by a forceful shot. After the match, he was taken ill and rushed to hospital where he was diagnosed with pleurisy. Irving found his first team opportunities limited after the injury and appeared in only four more matches for the club.

=== Chelsea ===
On 29 February 1928, Irving joined Second Division side Chelsea and made his debut in a victory over Hull City. Despite his advancing years, the Dundee Evening Telegraph reported that by December of the same year he was excelling following his move to Chelsea. Near the end of his first full season with Chelsea, Irving was signed on for another season shortly before the club embarked on a 20-match tour of South America. The team were surprised by the unsporting tactics of their opponents, and antics of the crowd who pelted them with oranges. Irving responded by catching one of the oranges, before peeling and eating the fruit. He was part of the side that won promotion out of the Second Division during the 1929–30 season after finishing the campaign as runners-up.

During a match against Liverpool in October 1931, Irving collapsed on the field late in the game and required medical attention. The cause was later discovered to be a burst varicose vein in his knee. The injury would keep Irving out of the side until the following year and, on his return, he found himself unable to regain his place in the first team. At the end of the 1931–32 season Irving was released by the club.

=== Bristol Rovers ===
In May 1932, he returned to Bristol, this time signing for Bristol Rovers alongside teammate Alec Donald. Irving assumed a player-coach role upon his arrival at the club. After leaving Rovers at the end of the season, Irving spent a year away from playing. He initially agreed to join Scottish Division Two side Brechin City in August 1934 but later backed out of the deal after deciding to retire from playing.

== International career ==
Irving first attracted the attention of selectors for the Irish national side in 1921 after his first season with Dundee, but was not called up after struggling with injury. He was again considered for selection for matches against Scotland and England in 1922, but missed the first match due to injury before turning down his call-up for the latter game due to Dundee suffering from a number of injuries which had left them short of players. He eventually made his debut for the side in March 1923 against Scotland and played in the remaining two matches of the 1922–23 British Home Championship. Their victory over England October 1923 was the first time they had defeated the opposition since 1914, with Irving being described as "a big factor" in the win by The Sunday Post. After the match, Irving and Billy Gillespie were carried off the pitch on the shoulders of the team's supporters.

In October 1925, Irving was selected to captain the Irish side for the first time, but withdrew from the squad when Dundee refused to release him for international duty. From his debut, Irving missed only one match for Ireland until 1929 when he was omitted from the squad for a match against Wales in February of that year when Chelsea refused to release him. After an absence of two years, Irving was recalled to win his 18th, and final cap, at the age of 38 in a 4–2 defeat against Wales in April 1931.

== Managerial career ==
Upon retiring from playing, Irving unsuccessfully applied for the vacant managerial position at his former club Dundee. In July 1938 he was involved in a takeover of Dundee United, taking control of the team as joint-manager/director with Jimmy Brownlie for the 1938–39 season. The pair led the side to 9th place in the Scottish First Division but stepped down from the manager's role after a year, remaining with the club as a director.

== Style of play ==
Irving spent the majority of his career as a half back. The Western Mail wrote that, although not as accomplished on the defensive side of the game as other leading backs, he was especially skilled at "creating openings for the forwards" and always "placed (his passing) perfectly". The paper also noted that, during his time with Dundee, he was regarded as "one of the best attacking half-backs in Scotland". During his career, Irving played at inside right on numerous occasions when required, but was often deemed to be simply adequate cover in the position rather than a natural.

In the later years of his career, the Dundee Evening Telegraph noted how Irving adapted his game to compensate for his advancing years, writing how he "has made a fine art of accomplishing much with the minimum of effort".

== Personal life ==
Irving married Nellie Gelston on 8 December 1922 in Monifieth. Bobby Willis, his Dundee teammate, served as his groomsman at the ceremony. The couple had a son and daughter together. Their son died as an infant in 1930 after suffering from diphtheria. During his playing career, Irving owned a shop in the Dundee area. After his retirement, Irving settled in Dundee where he ran the La Scala billiards hall and competed for the venue's team in the Dundee Snooker League. He died in December 1968 at the age of 75 in a Dundee hospital.

== Managerial statistics ==
Team	Country	From	To	Record				
Team	Country	From	To	G	W	D	L	Win %
Dundee United	(Scotland)	June 1938	July 1939	36	16	3	17	44.44
Total				36	16	3	17	44.44

== Honours ==
Dundee

- Scottish Cup runner-up: 1924–25

Cardiff City

- FA Cup: 1926–27
- FA Charity Shield: 1927
- Welsh Cup: 1926–27

Chelsea

- Football League Second Division runner-up: 1929–30
