= Alec Ross (footballer) =

Scottish footballer (1902–1985)

Alexander Smart Ross (27 July 1902 – 1985) was a Scottish footballer who played league football as a centre forward for Dundee, Arbroath and Rochdale. Ross was joint top goal scorer for Dundee in the 1925–26 season. He played one game for Rochdale in 1926 and scored one goal, but suffered a serious injury which subsequently ended his professional career.
