= Hugh Hilley =

Scottish footballer

Personal information
- Full name: Hugh Hilley
- Date of birth: 19 March 1899
- Place of birth: Glasgow, Scotland
- Date of death: 14 September 1987 (aged 88)
- Place of death: Paisley, Scotland
- Position: Left back

Senior career*
| Years | Team | Apps | (Gls) |
| – | St Anthony's | | |
| 1921–1928 | Celtic | 171 | (0) |

International career
| 1924 | Scottish League XI | 1 | (0) |
- * Club domestic league appearances and goals

Hugh Hilley (19 March 1899 – 14 September 1987) was a Scottish footballer, who played as a left back for Celtic from 1921 to 1928. He won the Scottish Football League championship in 1925–26, either side of Scottish Cup victories in 1925 and 1927, as well as one winner's medal each in the Glasgow Cup and Glasgow Merchants Charity Cup.

Noted for his energy and bravery on the field, in 1927 it was reported that he had suffered some kind of nervous breakdown brought on by exhaustion. He recovered, but decided to give up playing, and later operated an ice-cream shop in Townhead, Glasgow.
