= George Lawley =

English footballer (1903–1987)

Personal information
- Full name: George Harry Lawley
- Date of birth: 10 April 1903
- Place of birth: Wolverhampton, England
- Date of death: 7 April 1987 (aged 83)
- Place of death: Stourbridge, England
- Position: Winger

Senior career*
Years	Team	Apps	(Gls)
1920–1921	Bloxwich All Saints		
1921–1922	Talbot Stead Tube Works		
1922–1923	Darlaston		
1923–1925	Bloxwich Strollers		
1925–1926	Walsall	26	(3)
1926–1927	Burton Town		
1927	Merthyr Town	18	(2)
1927–1929	Dundee		
1929–1931	Sunderland	10	(1)
1931–1932	Swindon Town	28	(3)
1932–1933	Worcester City		
1933–1934	Shrewsbury Town		
1934	Brierley Hill Alliance		
1934–1935	Dudley Town		
1935	Hednesford Town		
1935–1936	Cannock Town		
1936	Nuneaton Town		
1936–193?	Bournville Athletic		
- * Club domestic league appearances and goals

George Lawley (10 April 1903 – 7 April 1987) was an English professional footballer who played as a winger for Sunderland.
