= George Aimer =

Scottish footballer (1897–1935)

Personal information
- Full name: George Anderson Aimer
- Date of birth: 27 October 1897
- Place of birth: Dundee, Scotland
- Date of death: 5 June 1935 (aged 37)
- Place of death: Dundee, Scotland
- Height: 5 ft 9 1/2 in (1.77 m)
- Position: Left back

Senior career*
| Years | Team | Apps | (Gls) |
- Eastern Juniors
| 1919–1921 | Dundee Hibernian | | |
| 1921–1923 | Dundee | 29 | (0) |
| 1923–1925 | Fulham | 16 | (0) |
| 1925–1927 | Third Lanark | 59 | (0) |
| 1927–1930 | Providence | 130 | (2) |
| 1931 | Fall River | 1 | (0) |
| 1931 | New York Giants | 2 | (0) |
- * Club domestic league appearances and goals

George Aimer (27 October 1897 – 5 June 1935) was a Scottish footballer who played in the English Football League for Fulham for two years, and spent roughly the same period with each of Dundee Hibernian, Dundee and Third Lanark in his homeland.

In 1927 he moved to the United States and signed with Providence of the American Soccer League. In the spring of 1931, he played for Fall River and finished his career with the New York Giants in the fall of 1931.

Aimer was killed in an accident during the demolition of a wall at Polepark Works, Dundee, on 5 June 1935, aged 37. Having seen that the tottering wall would bring down with it a heavy roof beam, and fearing that one of his workmates was in danger, he dashed through a doorway, being struck in the head.
