= Billy Cowan (footballer) =

Scottish footballer

Personal information
- Full name: William Duncan Cowan
- Date of birth: 9 August 1896
- Place of birth: Edinburgh, Scotland
- Height: 5 ft 9 1/2 in (1.77 m)
- Position: Inside right

Youth career
- Tranent

Senior career*
Years	Team	Apps	(Gls)
1920–1923	Dundee	68	(12)
1923–1925	Newcastle United	87	(23)
1926–1927	Manchester City	22	(11)
1927–1929	St Mirren	10	(4)
1929	Peebles Rovers		
- Northfleet
- North Shields
1930	Hartlepools United	3	(2)
1930	Darlington	7	(1)
- Bath City

International career
1924	Scotland	1	(1)
- * Club domestic league appearances and goals

William Duncan Cowan (9 August 1896 – unknown) was a Scottish professional footballer. An inside right who could also play at inside left, he played in the Football League for Newcastle United, Manchester City, Hartlepools United and Darlington.

Cowan also received one cap for Scotland, scoring his team's goal in a 1–1 draw with England in 1924

== Honours ==
Newcastle United

- FA Cup: 1923–24
