= Johnnie Rankin =

Scottish footballer

Personal information
- Full name: John Paterson Rankin
- Date of birth: 10 May 1901
- Place of birth: Coatbridge, Scotland
- Date of death: 24 September 1952 (aged 51)
- Place of death: Glasgow, Scotland
- Height: 5 ft 8 1/2 in (1.74 m)
- Position: Inside forward

Senior career*
Years	Team	Apps	(Gls)
–	Bellshill Athletic		
1922–1924	Hamilton Academical	40	(3)
1923	→ Ayr United (loan)	0	(0)
1923	→ Mid-Annandale (loan)		
1924	Doncaster Rovers	6	(0)
1924–1925	Bradford City		
1925	Dundee	13	(1)
1925–1930	Charlton Athletic	187	(34)
1930–1934	Chelsea	62	(9)
1934–1936	Notts County	25	(2)
1936–1937	Burton Town		
- * Club domestic league appearances and goals

John Paterson Rankin (10 May 1901 – 24 September 1952) was a Scottish footballer who played as an inside forward for clubs including Hamilton Academical, Dundee, Charlton Athletic, Chelsea and Notts County. He played on the losing side in the 1925 Scottish Cup Final while with Dundee and won the Football League Third Division South title in 1928–29 with Charlton, prior to playing in the English top flight with Chelsea where he featured regularly during the 1931–32 and 1932–33 campaigns.
