= Peter Wilson (footballer, born 1904) =

Scottish football player and manager (1905-1983)

Personal information
- Full name: Peter Wilson
- Date of birth: 25 November 1904
- Place of birth: Beith, Scotland
- Date of death: 13 February 1983 (aged 78)
- Place of death: Beith, Scotland
- Position: Right half

Youth career
- Beith

Senior career*
| Years | Team | Apps | (Gls) |
| 1923–1934 | Celtic | 344 | (14) |
| 1923 | → Beith (loan) | 2 | (0) |
| 1934–1938 | Hibernian | 87 | (2) |
| 1938–1939 | Dunfermline Athletic | 14 | (0) |
| Total | | 447 | (16) |

International career
| 1926–1933 | Scotland | 4 | (0) |
| 1926–1933 | Scottish League XI | 4 | (0) |

Managerial career
- 1938–1939: Dunfermline Athletic
- * Club domestic league appearances and goals

Peter Wilson (25 November 1904 – 13 February 1983) was a Scottish football player and manager.

Born in Beith in Cunninghame (North Ayrshire), Wilson played for Celtic, Hibernian and the Scotland national football team. With Celtic he won four Scottish Cup medals in 1925, 1927, 1931 and 1933 and one Scottish league medal in 1933. He later became player-manager of Dunfermline Athletic and a coach at Kilmarnock.
