= David Robb (footballer) =

Scottish footballer

Personal information
- Date of birth: 18 February 1903
- Place of birth: Leith, Scotland
- Date of death: July 1992 (aged 89)
- Place of death: Burnley, England
- Position: Half back

Youth career
- Leith Unitas
- Musselburgh Bruntonians

Senior career*
Years	Team	Apps	(Gls)
1924–1926	Dundee		
1924–1925	→ Arbroath (loan)		
1926–1930	Wigan Borough	107	(3)
1930–1932	Chesterfield	23	(1)
1932–1933	New Brighton	34	(0)
- * Club domestic league appearances and goals

David Robb (18 February 1903 – July 1992) was a Scottish footballer who played for Dundee, Wigan Borough, Chesterfield and New Brighton.
