= David McLean (footballer, born 1890) =

Scottish footballer

Personal information
- Full name: David Prophet McLean
- Date of birth: 13 December 1890
- Place of birth: Forfar, Scotland
- Date of death: 21 December 1967 (aged 77)
- Place of death: Forfar, Scotland
- Position: Striker

Youth career
- Forfar West End
- Forfar Celtic

Senior career*
Years	Team	Apps	(Gls)
1907	Forfar Athletic		
1907–1909	Celtic	24	(19)
1909–1911	Preston North End	49	(25)
1911–1919	Wednesday	135	(88)
1915–1918	→ Third Lanark (loan)	85	(70)
1918–1919	→ Rangers (loan)	24	(29)
1919–1922	Bradford (Park Avenue)	85	(49)
1922	Forfar Athletic		
1922–1926	Dundee	114	(43)
1926–1931	Forfar Athletic	153	(72)
Total		669	(395)

International career
1912	Scotland	1	(0)
1918	Scotland (wartime)	1	(1)
- * Club domestic league appearances and goals

David Prophet McLean (13 December 1890 – 21 December 1967) was a Scottish Association football striker. He scored over 150 goals in each of the Scottish and English football leagues. At club level he represented Celtic, Preston North End, Sheffield Wednesday, Third Lanark, Rangers, Bradford (Park Avenue), Dundee and Forfar Athletic. He had one cap for Scotland.

== Football ==
=== Celtic ===
McLean moved from Forfar to Glasgow to join Celtic as a 16-year-old; he quickly won a Glasgow Cup medal, being selected to make his debut in the replayed final against Rangers and scoring the decisive goal in a 2–1 victory. Though understudy to the established centre-forward Jimmy Quinn and out of favour for a spell after expressing anger at criticism from manager Willie Maley after a poor team performance, he was involved in Scottish Football League title wins in his first and second seasons, including a significant part in Celtic's 'famous fortnight' in April 1909, when they played eight games in twelve days to retain the championship. However, he was not able to displace Quinn and moved on to Preston North End while still a teenager.

=== The Wednesday, Rangers loan ===
In England he was the top scorer twice in successive seasons in England's top flight when playing for The Wednesday, as the Sheffield club were then named. He shared the distinction with two others on the first occasion, all with 25 strikes, before he was outright winner in 1912–13 on 30. In 1915, World War I halted league football in England, but not in Scotland, and McLean was permitted to play for Third Lanark, where he scored 70 goals in less than three seasons, and for Celtic's cross-town rivals, Rangers. In his sole season with the Ibrox club he was top scorer in the Scottish League in 1918–19 (29 goals in 24 matches); he thus became the first player to be outright top scorer in the top divisions in both England and Scotland. The feat has since only been matched by McLean's future teammate at Dundee, Dave Halliday. He also won another Glasgow Cup, eleven years after his first, with a win over his former employers Celtic; however, they claimed the league title over Rangers by a one-point margin. At the end of the war in 1919, McLean returned to Wednesday but was soon transferred to Bradford (Park Avenue) where he spent three years.

=== Dundee ===
McLean joined Dundee in 1922 where in his first season he was a teammate of Alex Troup. Dave Halliday was top scorer in Dundee's run to the 1925 Scottish Cup Final, in which McLean's goal had Dundee leading at half time. Celtic's Patsy Gallacher equalised before Jimmy McGrory headed a last minute winner for the Glasgow club. After his Dundee spell, McLean closed out his career back home with five more years at Forfar Athletic.

=== International ===
McLean received one cap for Scotland, in a 1912 British Home Championship match against England. While based in England, he took part in five Home Scots v Anglo-Scots trial matches between 1910 and 1920, scoring four times, with further international opportunities limited by the war.

=== IFFHS recognition ===
In the International Federation of Football History & Statistics updated 2008 list of the world's most successful top division goal scorers (1888–2008), McLean was placed at 43rd equal with 316 top division strikes.

== Cricket ==
McLean also played cricket for Strathmore C.C. and played in the game in June 1930 at The Hill in Kirriemuir when J.M. Barrie opened the pavilion, and two members of the touring Australian side, one of them the great Macartney, played before a packed crowd.

== Personal life ==
He was the elder brother of footballer George McLean who was also a forward. They were teammates at Bradford for one season (1921–22, David's last of three campaigns at the club and George's first of nine) and both closed out their careers at Forfar, but David (eight years older) had retired by the time George came 'home'.

Apart from when his footballing career took him elsewhere, he lived in Forfar all his life. He frequently attended football matches and was often invited to be the guest of Celtic at games in which they were involved. He died in December 1967.

== See also ==
- List of English football first tier top scorers
- Played for Celtic and Rangers
