= Willie Cook (footballer) =

Scottish footballer

Personal information
- Full name: William Lindsay Cook
- Date of birth: 11 March 1903
- Place of birth: Dundee, Scotland
- Date of death: June 1981 (aged 78)
- Place of death: Dundee, Scotland
- Height: 5 ft 4 1/2 in (1.64 m)
- Position: Outside left

Senior career*
Years	Team	Apps	(Gls)
- Dundee North End
1924–1925	Forfar Athletic	21	(3)
1925–1928	Dundee	117	(21)
1928–1935	Bolton Wanderers	234	(35)
1936	Blackpool	19	(1)
1937	Reading	33	(2)
1938–1942	Dundee	18	(1)
Total		442	(63)

International career
1926–1927	Scottish League XI	2	(0)
1934	Scotland	3	(0)
- * Club domestic league appearances and goals

William Lindsay Cook (11 March 1903 – 1981) was a Scottish professional footballer. An outside left, he began his senior career with Forfar Athletic before joining Dundee in 1925. Cook spent much of his career with Football League club Bolton Wanderers, winning the FA Cup at the end of his first season in 1929, and eventually making 234 League appearances and scoring 35 goals. He later played for Blackpool and Reading before rejoining Dundee in 1939. After the club temporarily closed down due to the Second World War, Cook made several guest appearances for neighbours Dundee United during 1941 while he was stationed locally with the Royal Air Force.

While at Bolton, Cook won three caps for the Scotland national team.

== Honours ==
Bolton Wanderers

- FA Cup: 1928–29
