= Walter Bird (footballer) =

English footballer

Personal information
- Full name: Walter Smith Bird
- Date of birth: 12 July 1891
- Place of birth: Hugglescote, England
- Date of death: 2 March 1965 (aged 73)
- Height: 5 ft 9 in (1.75 m)
- Position: Inside forward

Senior career*
Years	Team	Apps	(Gls)
1908–1909	Ellistown St Christopher's		
1909–1910	Hugglescote United		
1910–1912	Coalville Swifts		
1912–1915	Notts County	10	(2)
1919–1920	Grimsby Town	7	(2)
1920–1921	Bristol Rovers	20	(5)
1921–1923	Dundee		
1923–1924	Heart of Midlothian		
1924–1925	Kilmarnock		
1925–192?	Loughborough Corinthians		
- * Club domestic league appearances and goals

Walter Smith Bird (12 July 1891 – 2 March 1965) was an English professional footballer who played as an inside forward.
