= Willie Rankin (footballer, born 1900) =

Scottish footballer

William Rankin
Personal information
- Full name: William Rankin
- Date of birth: 20 March 1900
- Place of birth: Jamestown, Scotland
- Date of death: 1968 (aged 67–68)
- Place of death: Burton upon Trent, England
- Position: Centre half

Senior career*
Years	Team	Apps	(Gls)
–	Parkhead		
1922–1927	Dundee	155	(2)
1927–1932	Blackburn Rovers	144	(4)
1932–1933	Charlton Athletic	26	(0)
–	Burton Town		
Total		325	(6)

International career
1926	Scottish League XI	1	(0)

Managerial career
- –: Burton Town
- * Club domestic league appearances and goals

William Rankin (20 March 1900 – 1968) was a Scottish footballer who played as a centre half for Dundee, Blackburn Rovers and Charlton Athletic.

With Dundee he took part in two tours of Spain, finished on the losing side in the 1925 Scottish Cup Final, and was selected for the Scottish Football League XI in 1926. In his first season after moving to England with Football League First Division Blackburn, he won the FA Cup in 1928. He moved on to Second Division Charlton in March 1932, but was part of the team relegated in 1932–33, after which he retired from the professional game and became as player-manager of Burton Town, signing several other Scots including Alex Hair, John Torbet and former Dundee and Charlton teammate Johnnie Rankin (no relation). His post ended before June 1937, when he is known to have taken over the Devonshire Arms pub in Burton upon Trent.

== Honours ==
Blackburn Rovers

- FA Cup: 1927–28
