= Charlie Duncan =

Scottish footballer

Personal information
- Full name: Charles Stanley Duncan
- Date of birth: 1889
- Place of birth: Kinross, Scotland
- Date of death: Unknown
- Place of death: Scotland
- Height: 5 ft 7 1/2 in (1.71 m)
- Position: Centre forward

Senior career*
Years	Team	Apps	(Gls)
1912	Dunfermline Athletic	3	(3)
1912–1919	Birmingham	22	(6)
1916–1917	→ Rangers (loan)	25	(15)
1917–1918	→ Third Lanark (loan)	18	(11)
1919–1923	Clyde	142	(39)
1923–1926	Dundee	68	(17)
1926–1927	Arbroath	10	(3)
Total		288	(94)

International career
1921	Scottish League XI	1	(1)
- * Club domestic league appearances and goals

Charles Stanley Duncan (1889 – after 1927) was a Scottish professional footballer who scored 88 goal from 266 appearances in the Scottish League and 6 goals from 22 appearances in the English Football League. He began his senior career with Dunfermline Athletic, played for English club Birmingham either side of the First World War, and returned to Scotland where he represented Rangers, Third Lanark, Clyde, Dundee and Arbroath. He was capped once for the Scottish League representative team. He played as a centre forward.

== Career ==
Duncan was born in Kinross. He played for Dunfermline Athletic before coming to England to sign for Birmingham of the Second Division in 1913. He made his debut in the Football League on 22 February 1913, scoring the opening goal in a 3–1 home win against Hull City, and followed up with three more goals in the next five games, but lost his place when Billy Jones returned to fitness. Unable to establish himself in the first team, Duncan scored a remarkable 52 goals in the 1914–15 season for Birmingham's reserve team as they won the Birmingham & District League title. When the Football League was suspended for the duration of the First World War, Duncan returned to Scotland and signed for Clyde. He joined Rangers for the 1916–17 season, scored twice in the opening game against Dundee and a hat-trick in the third game, against Dumbarton, and finished the season as the club's top scorer, with 15 goals from 25 League games.

While a Clyde player, he was selected by the Scottish League XI for a representative match against the Irish League XI. The game took place on 26 October 1921 at Clyde's home ground, Shawfield Stadium, and Duncan scored the third goal of a 3–0 win.
