= John Gilmour (footballer) =

Scottish footballer

Personal information
- Full name: John Rooney Gilmour
- Date of birth: 15 June 1901
- Place of birth: Bellshill, Scotland
- Date of death: 26 February 1963 (aged 61)
- Place of death: Dundee, Scotland
- Height: 5 ft 11 in (1.80 m)
- Position: Left back

Senior career*
Years	Team	Apps	(Gls)
1921–1923	Bathgate	56	(2)
1923–1936	Dundee	333	(13)
1936–1937	Yeovil & Petters United		
1937	Montrose	11	(0)
1937	Brechin City	5	(0)
1938	Dundee United	9	(0)

International career
1930	Scottish League XI	1	(0)
1930	Scotland	1	(0)
- * Club domestic league appearances and goals

John Rooney Gilmour (15 June 1901 – 26 February 1963) was a Scottish footballer who played as a left back for Bathgate and Dundee, plus shorter spells with Yeovil & Petters United, Montrose, Brechin City and Dundee United.

He made 369 appearances in the Scottish Football League and Scottish Cup for Dundee between 1923 and 1936, playing in the 1925 Scottish Cup Final, a 2–1 defeat to Celtic. In that match he played at outside left and also filled in at right back at times in his first four years at Dens Park, with 'Napper' Thomson the usual occupant of the left back berth; after Thomson left the club in 1927, Gilmour made the position his own for the next eight seasons.

He made one appearance for the Scotland national team in 1930 and also played once for the Scottish League XI.

In 2024, Gilmour was named into the Dundee F.C. Hall of Fame, receiving the Heritage Award.
