= Jock Thomson =

Scottish footballer and manager

Personal information
- Full name: John Ross Thomson
- Date of birth: 6 July 1906
- Place of birth: Thornton, Scotland
- Date of death: 1979 (aged 72–73)
- Place of death: Carnoustie, Scotland
- Height: 6 ft 0 in (1.83 m)
- Position: Left half

Senior career*
Years	Team	Apps	(Gls)
–	Thornton Rangers		
1924–1930	Dundee	125	(7)
1930–1939	Everton	272	(5)
Total		397	(12)

International career
1929	Scottish League XI	1	(0)
1932	Scotland	1	(0)

Managerial career
- 1947–1950: Manchester City
- * Club domestic league appearances and goals

John Ross Thomson (6 July 1906 – 1979) was a Scottish football player and manager.

== Playing career ==
Thomson, a wing half, started his career with Thornton Rangers in his native Fife, before moving to Dundee, where he played for four years. In 1929 he moved to Everton. His Everton career had an inauspicious start, with the club suffering relegation in his first season. The following season, he gained a Second Division winners medal as Everton made an immediate return to the top flight, and then added a First Division medal in 1932 as Everton became champions. He played in the 1933 FA Cup Final, helping Everton to a 3–0 win against Manchester City. Later in his time at Everton, first team appearances became more uncommon for Thomson as he was displaced from the team by Joe Mercer. Thomson retired from playing in 1939, having made 299 appearances for Everton, in which he scored five goals.

He made his only full international appearance in 1932, representing Scotland in a 5–2 home international defeat against Wales.

== Managerial career ==
In 1947 Thomson became manager of Manchester City, replacing Sam Cowan. In his first season in charge the club finished tenth in the First Division, though they failed to win any of the final six games of the season. The 1948–49 season saw a slight upturn with a seventh-place finish. In October 1949 Thomson made the decision to sign goalkeeper Bert Trautmann, attracting criticism for signing a former German paratrooper so soon after World War II. Trautmann justified Thomson's decision by going on to play for the club for 15 years. The 1949–50 season proved to be Thomson's last. With two thirds of the season gone City had won only five matches. Thomson was dismissed, and at the end of season the club were relegated.

After leaving Manchester City, Thomson returned to Scotland, where he ran a pub until his retirement. He died in 1979.

== Honours ==
Everton

- FA Cup: 1932–33

Sporting positions
Preceded by Billy Cook	Everton captain 1938-1939	Succeeded by None (due to outbreak of the Second World War)
