= Jock Ross (1920s footballer) =

Scottish footballer

Personal information
- Place of birth: Paisley, Scotland
- Height: 5 ft 8 in (1.73 m)
- Positions: Right half; right back

Senior career*
Years	Team	Apps	(Gls)
1921–1929	Dundee	178	(2)
1929–1930	Dundee United	35	(0)
1930–1931	Connah's Quay		
- * Club domestic league appearances and goals

John Ross was a Scottish footballer. His regular positions were defensive: right half or right back, although he began his career at outside right and scored the only two goals of his career in 1921–22 while in that forward role. He played for Dundee for eight seasons – meeting King Alfonso XIII of Spain as team captain during a 1923 tour and featuring on the losing side in the 1925 Scottish Cup Final – then switched to local rivals Dundee United for just over one season, before playing in Wales with Connah's Quay.
