= Finlay Brown (footballer) =

Scottish footballer

Personal information
- Full name: John Finlay Brown
- Date of birth: 18 May 1902
- Place of birth: Newbattle, Scotland
- Date of death: 1977 (aged 74–75)
- Place of death: Dundee, Scotland
- Position: Right back

Senior career*
Years	Team	Apps	(Gls)
1920–1923	Newtongrange Star		
1923–1934	Dundee	270	(3)

International career
1931	Scottish League XI	1	(0)
- * Club domestic league appearances and goals

John Finlay Brown (18 May 1902 – 1977) was a Scottish footballer. His regular position was defender. Joining from Newtongrange Star where he had been a member of the team that dominated the Midlothian Junior League, he played for Dundee (his only club at the professional level) for a decade, featuring on the losing side in the 1925 Scottish Cup Final. He was selected once for the Scottish League XI in 1931. Following his departure from Dundee in 1934 it was speculated locally that he may join Darlington in England, but it appears this did not transpire.

In 1930, Brown was involved in an on-field collision with opponent Daniel McKenzie of Aberdeen, who later died from his injuries a year later, aged 22.
