= David Thomson (footballer, born 1892) =

Scottish footballer

Personal information
- Date of birth: 1892
- Place of birth: Dundee, Scotland
- Position: Left back

Senior career*
Years	Team	Apps	(Gls)
1913–1927	Dundee	350	(15)
Total		350	(15)

International career
1920	Scotland	1	(0)
1921	Scottish League XI	2	(0)
- * Club domestic league appearances and goals

David Thomson (1892 – c. 1950) was a Scottish footballer who played as a left back for Dundee and Scotland. He played in the 1925 Scottish Cup Final which Dundee lost to Celtic.

Known as 'Napper', he received a benefit match against Aberdeen in 1926, and is a posthumous inductee of the Dundee Hall of Fame since 2018.

== See also ==
- List of one-club men in association football
