= 1953–54 Dundee F.C. season =

Dundee
1953–54 season
- Manager: George Anderson
- Division A: 7th
- Scottish Cup: 3rd round
- League Cup: Group Stage
- Top goalscorer: League: Albert Henderson (9); All: George Merchant (11)
Home colours

The 1953–54 season was the fifty-second season in which Dundee competed at a Scottish national level, playing in Division A, where the club would finish in 7th place for the second consecutive season. Dundee would also compete in both the Scottish Cup and the Scottish League Cup. Dundee failed to defend their League Cup champion status for a third consecutive year, being knocked out of the group stages by goal ratio. As for the Scottish Cup, they would be upset by Division C side Berwick Rangers in the third round. This season would be the final for manager George Anderson, whose ill health forced him into retirement at the end of the campaign.

== Scottish Division A ==
Statistics provided by Dee Archive.

| Match day | Date | Opponent | H/A | Score | Dundee scorer(s) | Attendance |
|---|---|---|---|---|---|---|
| 1 | 5 September | Falkirk | A | 0–4 | | 15,000 |
| 2 | 12 September | Raith Rovers | H | 0–0 | | 23,000 |
| 3 | 19 September | Aberdeen | A | 1–1 | Flavell | 20,000 |
| 4 | 26 September | Clyde | H | 2–0 | Turnbull, Steel | 18,000 |
| 5 | 3 October | Hamilton Academical | A | 3–2 | Turnbull (2), Carmichael | 10,000 |
| 6 | 10 October | Queen of the South | H | 4–1 | Cowie, Christie, Turnbull, Steel | 22,000 |
| 7 | 17 October | Heart of Midlothian | A | 1–2 | Flavell | 26,000 |
| 8 | 24 October | Rangers | H | 1–0 | A. Henderson | 34,000 |
| 9 | 31 October | Celtic | H | 1–1 | Cowie | 27,000 |
| 10 | 7 November | Partick Thistle | A | 0–1 | | 16,000 |
| 11 | 14 November | Airdrieonians | A | 2–2 | Steel, A. Henderson | 9,000 |
| 12 | 21 November | Stirling Albion | H | 2–1 | A. Henderson, Turnbull | 15,000 |
| 13 | 28 November | Hibernian | H | 1–0 | Cowie | 26,000 |
| 14 | 12 December | East Fife | H | 1–1 | A. Henderson | 15,000 |
| 15 | 19 December | Falkirk | A | 1–0 | A. Henderson | 13,000 |
| 16 | 26 December | Raith Rovers | A | 2–1 | Toner (2) | 10,000 |
| 17 | 1 January | Aberdeen | H | 4–2 | Toner (2), Steel, Malloy | 28,000 |
| 18 | 2 January | Clyde | A | 0–2 | | 18,000 |
| 19 | 9 January | Hamilton Academical | H | 3–2 | Steel, Carmichael (2) | 14,000 |
| 20 | 16 January | Queen of the South | A | 1–5 | Merchant | 8,500 |
| 21 | 23 January | Heart of Midlothian | H | 2–4 | Cowie, Steel | 25,000 |
| 22 | 6 February | Rangers | A | 0–2 | | 38,000 |
| 23 | 20 February | Celtic | A | 1–5 | Merchant | 32,000 |
| 24 | 10 March | Airdrieonians | H | 1–0 | Merchant | 5,500 |
| 25 | 13 March | Stirling Albion | A | 3–2 | Merchant, Christie, A. Henderson | 7,000 |
| 26 | 20 March | Hibernian | A | 0–2 | | 23,000 |
| 27 | 27 March | St Mirren | H | 2–0 | Gallacher, Christie | 10,000 |
| 28 | 3 April | East Fife | A | 1–1 | Merchant | 3,000 |
| 29 | 10 April | St Mirren | A | 0–3 | | 7,000 |
| 30 | 17 April | Partick Thistle | H | 6–0 | Merchant, A. Henderson (3), Hill, Walker | 11,000 |

=== League table ===
| Pos | Team | Pld | W | D | L | GF | GA | GD | Pts |
|---|---|---|---|---|---|---|---|---|---|
| 5 | Hibernian | 30 | 15 | 4 | 11 | 72 | 51 | +21 | 34 |
| 6 | East Fife | 30 | 13 | 8 | 9 | 55 | 45 | +10 | 34 |
| 7 | Dundee | 30 | 14 | 6 | 10 | 46 | 47 | −1 | 34 |
| 8 | Clyde | 30 | 15 | 4 | 11 | 64 | 67 | −3 | 34 |
| 9 | Aberdeen | 30 | 15 | 3 | 12 | 66 | 51 | +15 | 33 |

Source: RSSSF

== Scottish League Cup ==
Statistics provided by Dee Archive.

=== Group 4 ===
| Match day | Date | Opponent | H/A | Score | Dundee scorer(s) | Attendance |
|---|---|---|---|---|---|---|
| 1 | 8 August | Stirling Albion | H | 6–1 | Flavell (4), Steel (2) | 21,000 |
| 2 | 12 August | Clyde | A | 4–2 | Ziesing, Christie, Flavell, Turnbull | 15,000 |
| 3 | 15 August | Partick Thistle | H | 1–1 | Turnbull | 19,500 |
| 4 | 22 August | Stirling Albion | A | 2–0 | Christie (2) | 11,000 |
| 5 | 26 August | Clyde | H | 4–2 | Turnbull (2), Christie, Steel | 20,000 |
| 6 | 29 August | Partick Thistle | A | 0–4 | | 30,000 |

==== Group 4 table ====
| Team | Pld | W | D | L | GF | GA | GR | Pts |
|---|---|---|---|---|---|---|---|---|
| Partick Thistle | 6 | 4 | 1 | 1 | 15 | 7 | 2.143 | 9 |
| Dundee | 6 | 4 | 1 | 1 | 17 | 10 | 1.700 | 9 |
| Clyde | 6 | 1 | 1 | 4 | 14 | 19 | 0.737 | 3 |
| Stirling Albion | 6 | 1 | 1 | 4 | 8 | 18 | 0.444 | 3 |

== Scottish Cup ==
Statistics provided by Dee Archive.

| Match day | Date | Opponent | H/A | Score | Dundee scorer(s) | Attendance |
|---|---|---|---|---|---|---|
| 2nd round | 13 February | Albion Rovers | A | 1–1 | Merchant | 9,000 |
| 2R replay | 17 February | Albion Rovers | H | 4–0 | Merchant (4) | 12,256 |
| 3rd round | 27 February | Berwick Rangers | A | 0–3 | | 9,000 |

== Player statistics ==
Statistics provided by Dee Archive

| No. | Pos | Nat | Player | Total | | Division A | | Scottish Cup | | League Cup | |
| No. | Pos | Nat | Player | Apps | Goals | Apps | Goals | Apps | Goals | Apps | Goals |
|---|---|---|---|---|---|---|---|---|---|---|---|
| | GK | (Scotland) SCO | Bill Brown | 29 | 0 | 20 | 0 | 3 | 0 | 6 | 0 |
| | FW | (Northern Ireland) NIR | Gerry Burrell | 5 | 0 | 5 | 0 | 0 | 0 | 0 | 0 |
| | FW | (Scotland) SCO | George Carmichael | 10 | 3 | 10 | 3 | 0 | 0 | 0 | 0 |
| | FW | (Scotland) SCO | George Christie | 30 | 7 | 24 | 3 | 0 | 0 | 6 | 4 |
| | DF | (Canada) CAN | Jack Cowan | 25 | 0 | 20 | 0 | 1 | 0 | 4 | 0 |
| | MF | (Scotland) SCO | Doug Cowie | 36 | 4 | 27 | 4 | 3 | 0 | 6 | 0 |
| | MF | (Scotland) SCO | Willie Craig | 1 | 0 | 1 | 0 | 0 | 0 | 0 | 0 |
| | FW | (Scotland) SCO | Bobby Flavell | 18 | 7 | 12 | 2 | 2 | 0 | 4 | 5 |
| | DF | (Scotland) SCO | Gerry Follon | 19 | 0 | 10 | 0 | 3 | 0 | 6 | 0 |
| | DF | (Scotland) SCO | Gordon Frew | 28 | 0 | 23 | 0 | 3 | 0 | 2 | 0 |
| | MF | (Scotland) SCO | Tommy Gallacher | 31 | 1 | 22 | 1 | 3 | 0 | 6 | 0 |
| | FW | (Scotland) SCO | Albert Henderson | 23 | 9 | 21 | 9 | 0 | 0 | 2 | 0 |
| | GK | (Scotland) SCO | Bobby Henderson | 10 | 0 | 10 | 0 | 0 | 0 | 0 | 0 |
| | FW | (Scotland) SCO | George Hill | 23 | 1 | 15 | 1 | 2 | 0 | 6 | 0 |
| | DF | (Scotland) SCO | Andy Irvine | 9 | 0 | 8 | 0 | 1 | 0 | 0 | 0 |
| | DF | (Scotland) SCO | Danny Malloy | 32 | 1 | 29 | 1 | 3 | 0 | 0 | 0 |
| | FW | (Scotland) SCO | George Merchant | 13 | 11 | 10 | 6 | 3 | 5 | 0 | 0 |
| | FW | (Scotland) SCO | Archie Simpson | 1 | 0 | 1 | 0 | 0 | 0 | 0 | 0 |
| | FW | (Scotland) SCO | Billy Steel | 33 | 9 | 25 | 6 | 2 | 0 | 6 | 3 |
| | MF | (Scotland) SCO | Jackie Stewart | 7 | 0 | 7 | 0 | 0 | 0 | 0 | 0 |
| | FW | (Scotland) SCO | Jimmy Toner | 6 | 4 | 6 | 4 | 0 | 0 | 0 | 0 |
| | FW | (England) ENG | Ronnie Turnbull | 23 | 9 | 16 | 5 | 1 | 0 | 6 | 4 |
| | FW | (Scotland) SCO | Bert Walker | 1 | 1 | 1 | 1 | 0 | 0 | 0 | 0 |
| | MF | (South Africa) RSA | Ken Ziesing | 16 | 1 | 7 | 0 | 3 | 0 | 6 | 1 |

== See also ==
- List of Dundee F.C. seasons
