= 1954–55 Dundee F.C. season =

Dundee
1954–55 season
- Manager: Willie Thornton
- Division A: 8th
- Scottish Cup: 5th round
- League Cup: Group Stage
- Top goalscorer: League: George Merchant (11); All: George Merchant (16)
Home colours

The 1954–55 season was the fifty-third season in which Dundee competed at a Scottish national level, playing in Division A, where the club would finish in 8th place under new manager Willie Thornton. Dundee would also compete in both the Scottish Cup and the Scottish League Cup. They would be knocked out of the group stages of the League Cup, and would be defeated by Rangers in a replay in the 5th round of the Scottish Cup.

== Scottish Division A ==
Statistics provided by Dee Archive.

Match day	Date	Opponent	H/A	Score	Dundee scorer(s)	Attendance
1	11 September	Raith Rovers	A	0–3		14,000
2	18 September	Aberdeen	H	0–2		27,000
3	25 September	Kilmarnock	A	2–0	Walker, A. Henderson	15,000
4	2 October	Heart of Midlothian	H	3–2	Dunsmuir, Malloy	20,000
5	9 October	Clyde	A	0–2		11,000
6	16 October	Falkirk	H	2–0	A. Henderson, Walker	18,500
7	23 October	Rangers	A	0–3		30,000
8	30 October	Queen of the South	H	3–1	Carmichael, Dunsmuir, Flavell	13,500
9	6 November	East Fife	A	1–4	Flavell	9,000
10	13 November	St Mirren	H	0–1		12,500
11	20 November	Hibernian	A	1–3	Roy	30,000
12	27 November	Stirling Albion	A	2–0	Merchant, A. Henderson	4,000
13	4 December	Motherwell	H	4–1	Malloy, Merchant (3)	14,000
14	11 December	Partick Thistle	H	3–1	Carmichael (2), Merchant	16,000
15	18 December	Celtic	A	1–4	Merchant	14,000
16	25 December	Raith Rovers	H	4–1	Merchant (2), A. Henderson, Christie	13,000
17	1 January	Aberdeen	A	0–1		25,000
18	3 January	Kilmarnock	H	2–5	Cowie, Merchant	17,000
19	8 January	Heart of Midlothian	A	1–2	Christie	24,000
20	29 January	Rangers	H	2–1	Christie, Merchant	28,000
21	12 February	Queen of the South	A	1–1	Chalmers	6,500
22	5 March	St Mirren	A	2–0	Dunsmuir, A. Henderson	12,000
23	9 March	East Fife	H	1–1	Dunsmuir	7,000
24	12 March	Hibernian	H	2–2	Merchant, Christie	18,000
25	19 March	Stirling Albion	H	4–1	Chalmers (3), Malloy	8,000
26	26 March	Motherwell	A	2–0	A. Henderson (2)	9,000
27	2 April	Partick Thistle	A	1–2	Chalmers	10,000
28	9 April	Celtic	H	0–1		23,000
29	11 April	Clyde	H	2–1	Cowie, Chalmers	12,010
30	30 April	Falkirk	A	2–2	A. Henderson, Christie	12,000

=== League table ===
Pos	Team	Pld	W	D	L	GF	GA	GD	Pts
6	St Mirren	30	12	8	10	55	54	+1	32
7	Clyde	30	11	9	10	59	50	+9	31
8	Dundee	30	13	4	13	48	48	0	30
9	Partick Thistle	30	11	7	12	49	61	−12	29
10	Kilmarnock	30	10	6	14	46	58	−12	26

Source: RSSSF

== Scottish League Cup ==
Statistics provided by Dee Archive.

=== Group 4 ===
Match day	Date	Opponent	H/A	Score	Dundee scorer(s)	Attendance
1	14 August	Heart of Midlothian	A	1–3	Hill	35,000
2	18 August	Celtic	H	3–1	Merchant, A. Henderson, Roy	29,000
3	21 August	Falkirk	H	3–1	Merchant (3)	16,500
4	28 August	Heart of Midlothian	H	4–1	Merchant, Roy (2), Gallacher	29,500
5	1 September	Celtic	A	1–0	Malloy	30,000
6	4 September	Falkirk	A	0–4		15,000

==== Group 4 table ====
Team	Pld	W	D	L	GF	GA	GR	Pts
Heart of Midlothian	6	5	0	1	19	11	1.727	10
Dundee	6	4	0	2	12	10	1.200	8
Celtic	6	1	1	4	9	11	0.818	3
Falkirk	6	1	1	4	10	18	0.556	3

== Scottish Cup ==
Statistics provided by Dee Archive.

Match day	Date	Opponent	H/A	Score	Dundee scorer(s)	Attendance
5th round	5 February	Rangers	A	0–0		58,000
5R replay	9 February	Rangers	H	0–1		25,600

== Player statistics ==
Statistics provided by Dee Archive

No.	Pos	Nat	Player	Total		Division A		Scottish Cup		League Cup	
No.	Pos	Nat	Player	Apps	Goals	Apps	Goals	Apps	Goals	Apps	Goals
	GK	(Scotland) SCO	Bill Brown	36	0	28	0	2	0	6	0
	FW	(Scotland) SCO	George Carmichael	11	3	11	3	0	0	0	0
	FW	(Scotland) SCO	Jimmy Chalmers	14	6	12	6	2	0	0	0
	FW	(Scotland) SCO	George Christie	28	5	22	5	2	0	4	0
	MF	(Scotland) SCO	Doug Cowie	28	2	26	2	2	0	0	0
	MF	(Scotland) SCO	Willie Craig	15	0	8	0	2	0	5	0
	FW	(Scotland) SCO	Davie Dunsmuir	14	4	14	4	0	0	0	0
	FW	(Scotland) SCO	Dave Easson	3	0	1	0	0	0	2	0
	FW	(Scotland) SCO	Bobby Flavell	10	2	8	2	0	0	2	0
	DF	(Scotland) SCO	Gerry Follon	18	0	17	0	0	0	1	0
	MF	(Scotland) SCO	Tommy Gallacher	35	1	27	0	2	0	6	1
	DF	(Scotland) SCO	Davie Gray	20	0	12	0	2	0	6	0
	FW	(Scotland) SCO	Albert Henderson	37	10	29	9	2	0	6	1
	GK	(Scotland) SCO	Bobby Henderson	2	0	2	0	0	0	0	0
	FW	(Scotland) SCO	George Hill	16	1	10	0	0	0	6	1
	DF	(Scotland) SCO	Andy Irvine	34	0	28	0	0	0	6	0
	DF	(Scotland) SCO	Danny Malloy	38	4	30	3	2	0	6	1
	DF	(Scotland) SCO	Alan Massie	1	0	1	0	0	0	0	0
	MF	(Scotland) SCO	Jimmy Mason	1	0	1	0	0	0	0	0
	FW	(Scotland) SCO	George Merchant	23	16	18	11	2	0	3	5
	DF	(Scotland) SCO	Hugh Reid	1	0	1	0	0	0	0	0
	FW	(Scotland) SCO	Joe Roy	23	4	15	1	2	0	6	3
	FW	(Scotland) SCO	Davie Sneddon	1	0	1	0	0	0	0	0
	FW	(Scotland) SCO	Bert Walker	8	2	7	2	0	0	1	0
	DF	(Scotland) SCO	Jake Young	1	0	1	0	0	0	0	0

== See also ==
- List of Dundee F.C. seasons
