= 1919–20 Dundee F.C. season =

Dundee
1919–20 season
- Manager: Sandy MacFarlane
- Stadium: Dens Park
- Division One: 4th
- Scottish Cup: Second round
- Top goalscorer: League: John Bell (28); All: John Bell (28)
Home colours

The 1919–20 season was the twenty-fifth season in which Dundee competed at a Scottish national level, playing in Division One, and their first since 1916–17, after being asked by the Scottish Football League to leave due to travel difficulties imposed by World War I. In the interim, Dundee has competed in the Eastern Football League, before being readmitted after the war in 1919. Their return to the national level would be under a new manager in former long-time player Sandy MacFarlane, following the resignation of William Wallace in 1919 for health reasons. They would finish in 4th place, their highest finish since 1908–09. Dundee would also compete in the Scottish Cup for the first time since its restart, and were knocked out in the 2nd round by Celtic.

== Scottish Division One ==
Statistics provided by Dee Archive.

Match day	Date	Opponent	H/A	Score	Dundee scorer(s)	Attendance
1	16 August	Motherwell	A	1–3	D. Brown	10,000
2	23 August	Third Lanark	H	3–1	Buchan, McDonald, Thomson	12,000
3	30 August	Partick Thistle	A	0–1		
4	3 September	Airdrieonians	A	2–1	D. Brown (2)	
5	6 September	St Mirren	H	1–2	D. Brown	13,000
6	13 September	Falkirk	A	1–2	D. Brown	
7	20 September	Heart of Midlothian	H	1–0	D. Brown	16,000
8	22 September	Aberdeen	A	0–2		12,000
9	4 October	Airdrieonians	H	1–1	Troup	14,000
10	6 October	Motherwell	H	3–0	D. Brown (2), Slade	14,000
11	11 October	Dumbarton	A	3–0	D. Brown (2), McLaughlan	
12	18 October	Hamilton Academical	H	1–0	D. Brown	
13	25 October	Rangers	H	0–2		28,000
14	1 November	Clydebank	A	3–3	Slade (2), Bell	
15	8 November	Clyde	H	3–0	Bell (2), Troup	12,000
16	15 November	Raith Rovers	A	3–1	Rawlings, Bell (2)	
17	22 November	Albion Rovers	H	3–2	McDonald, Bell (2)	15,000
18	29 November	Ayr United	H	7–1	Bell (3), Nicol, Slade (2), McLaughlan	14,000
19	6 December	Greenock Morton	A	0–0		
20	13 December	Raith Rovers	H	5–4	Bell (2), McLauglan, Slade (2)	12,000
21	20 December	Queen's Park	A	2–3	Bell, Slade	20,000
22	25 December	Third Lanark	A	0–2		16,000
23	27 December	Hibernian	H	3–1	Slade, Bell (2)	14,000
24	1 January	Aberdeen	H	1–3	Troup	20,000
25	3 January	Albion Rovers	A	2–0	Bell, McLaughlan	
26	10 January	Kilmarnock	H	3–2	Bell, Gibson (o.g.), Hamilton (o.g.)	10,000
27	17 January	Clyde	A	2–3	Bell (2)	
28	31 January	Celtic	H	2–1	Bell, McLauglan	20,000
29	14 February	Heart of Midlothian	A	1–2	Slade	20,000
30	21 February	Falkirk	H	1–0	Troup	10,000
31	28 February	St Mirren	A	3–1	Bell (3)	
32	13 March	Kilmarnock	A	2–4	Jackson, Slade	
33	20 March	Dumbarton	H	3–1	Bell, Cowan, Rawlings	10,000
34	27 March	Queen's Park	H	1–1	Bell	14,000
35	3 April	Hamilton Academical	H	2–1	Downie (2)	12,000
36	10 April	Ayr United	A	3–5	Bell (2), Downie	
37	12 April	Clydebank	H	1–0	Nicol	15,000
38	17 April	Partick Thistle	H	2–1	Rawlings, McDonald	18,000
39	21 April	Greenock Morton	H	2–0	Bell, McDonald	16,000
40	24 April	Rangers	A	1–6	Slade	25,000
41	26 April	Celtic	A	1–1	Slade	7,000
42	1 May	Hibernian	A	0–0		7,000

=== League table ===
Pos	Team	Pld	W	D	L	GF	GA	GD	Pts
2	Celtic	42	29	10	3	89	31	+58	68
3	Motherwell	42	23	11	8	74	53	+21	57
4	Dundee	42	22	6	14	79	65	+14	50
5	Clydebank	42	20	8	14	79	65	+14	48
6	Morton	42	16	13	13	71	48	+23	45

Source: "1919-1920 SFL - SPFL Archive". SPFL.

== Scottish Cup ==
Statistics provided by Dee Archive.

Match day	Date	Opponent	H/A	Score	Dundee scorer(s)	Attendance
1st round	24 January	Airdrieonians	H	1–0	Slade	25,000
2nd round	7 February	Celtic	H	1–3	McLaughlan	34,000

== Player statistics ==
Statistics provided by Dee Archive

No.	Pos	Nat	Player	Total		First Division		Scottish Cup	
No.	Pos	Nat	Player	Apps	Goals	Apps	Goals	Apps	Goals
	FW	(Scotland) SCO	John Bell	30	28	28	28	2	0
	FW	(Scotland) SCO	Davie Brown	13	11	13	11	0	0
	DF	(Scotland) SCO	Willie Brown	6	0	6	0	0	0
	FW	(England) ENG	Colin Buchan	6	1	6	1	0	0
	GK	(Scotland) SCO	Tom Capper	7	0	7	0	0	0
	MF	(Scotland) SCO	Peter Connelly	1	0	1	0	0	0
	FW	(Scotland) SCO	Willie Cowan	5	1	5	1	0	0
	FW	(Scotland) SCO	Jim Downie	3	3	3	3	0	0
	DF	(Scotland) SCO	Ernie Ferguson	1	0	1	0	0	0
	DF	(Scotland) SCO	Adam Fleming	2	0	2	0	0	0
	FW	(Scotland) SCO	George Henderson	7	0	7	0	0	0
	MF	(Scotland) SCO	Davie Hutcheson	23	0	22	0	1	0
	FW	(Scotland) SCO	John Jackson	22	1	20	1	2	0
	FW	(Scotland) SCO	Dave McDonald	23	4	23	4	0	0
	MF	(Scotland) SCO	Roy McDonald	8	0	8	0	0	0
	MF	(Scotland) SCO	Bert McIntosh	41	0	39	0	2	0
	FW	(Scotland) SCO	Jim McLaughlan	19	6	18	5	1	1
	MF	(Scotland) SCO	Bill Nairn	3	0	3	0	0	0
	MF	(Scotland) SCO	Dave Nicol	35	2	33	2	2	0
	FW	(Scotland) SCO	Jim Orr	3	0	3	0	0	0
	FW	(Scotland) SCO	John Paterson	1	0	1	0	0	0
	DF	(Scotland) SCO	David Raitt	43	0	41	0	2	0
	FW	(England) ENG	Archie Rawlings	29	3	27	3	2	0
	FW	(England) ENG	Donald Slade	31	14	29	13	2	1
	MF	(Scotland) SCO	George Stuart	1	0	1	0	0	0
	DF	(Scotland) SCO	David Thomson	42	1	40	1	2	0
	FW	(Scotland) SCO	Alec Troup	42	4	40	4	2	0
	GK	(Scotland) SCO	John Vallis	5	0	5	0	0	0
	GK	(Scotland) SCO	James Watson	32	0	30	0	2	0

== See also ==
- List of Dundee F.C. seasons
