= 1920–21 Dundee F.C. season =

Dundee
1920–21 season
- Manager: Sandy MacFarlane
- Stadium: Dens Park
- Division One: 4th
- Scottish Cup: Quarter-finals
- Top goalscorer: League: John Bell (25); All: John Bell (26)
Home colours

The 1920–21 season was the twenty-sixth season in which Dundee competed at a Scottish national level, playing in Division One. They would finish in 4th place for the second consecutive season. Dundee would also compete in the Scottish Cup, where they were knocked out in the Quarter-finals by Albion Rovers.

== Scottish Division One ==
Statistics provided by Dee Archive.

| Match day | Date | Opponent | H/A | Score | Dundee scorer(s) | Attendance |
|---|---|---|---|---|---|---|
| 1 | 16 August | Falkirk | A | 2–2 | Bell (2) | 7,000 |
| 2 | 21 August | Aberdeen | H | 1–1 | Bell | 18,000 |
| 3 | 25 August | Third Lanark | A | 1–0 | Troup | 15,000 |
| 4 | 28 August | Dumbarton | H | 1–1 | Bell | 3,000 |
| 5 | 4 September | Falkirk | H | 2–0 | Irving, Troup | 18,000 |
| 6 | 8 September | Hamilton Academical | A | 0–1 | | 10,000 |
| 7 | 11 September | St Mirren | A | 1–0 | Bell | 8,000 |
| 8 | 18 September | Third Lanark | H | 2–1 | Johnstone, Bell | 17,000 |
| 9 | 25 September | Queen's Park | H | 1–1 | Bell | 19,000 |
| 10 | 2 October | Raith Rovers | A | 2–1 | Bell, McLean | |
| 11 | 4 October | Heart of Midlothian | H | 3–0 | Honeyman, Bell (2) | 14,000 |
| 12 | 9 October | Motherwell | A | 2–1 | Bell, Hogg | |
| 13 | 16 October | Celtic | H | 1–2 | Bell | 25,000 |
| 14 | 23 October | Heart of Midlothian | A | 1–3 | Bell | 19,500 |
| 15 | 30 October | Kilmarnock | H | 3–1 | Bell, Troup, Cowan | 16,000 |
| 16 | 6 November | Rangers | A | 0–5 | | 41,300 |
| 17 | 13 November | Airdrieonians | H | 0–1 | | 14,000 |
| 18 | 20 November | Hibernian | A | 0–2 | | 12,000 |
| 19 | 27 November | Clyde | H | 2–1 | McLean, Thomson | 12,000 |
| 20 | 4 December | Ayr United | A | 1–1 | Troup | |
| 21 | 11 December | Albion Rovers | H | 3–0 | McLean (2), Thomson | 20,000 |
| 22 | 18 December | Partick Thistle | A | 1–2 | McLean | |
| 23 | 25 December | Hamilton Academical | H | 4–0 | Bell (2), McDonald, McLean | 11,000 |
| 24 | 1 January | Aberdeen | A | 0–0 | | 20,000 |
| 25 | 3 January | Hibernian | H | 1–1 | Nicoll | 20,000 |
| 26 | 8 January | Greenock Morton | H | 0–0 | | 15,000 |
| 27 | 15 January | Queen's Park | A | 0–0 | | |
| 28 | 29 January | Dumbarton | H | 2–1 | Bell, Thomson | 15,000 |
| 29 | 9 February | Clydebank | A | 1–0 | T. Jackson | 2,000 |
| 30 | 12 February | Rangers | H | 1–2 | T. Jackson | 28,000 |
| 31 | 26 February | Raith Rovers | H | 0–0 | | 15,000 |
| 32 | 9 March | Celtic | A | 0–2 | | 10,000 |
| 33 | 12 March | Partick Thistle | H | 1–0 | Bell | 4,000 |
| 34 | 19 March | Kilmarnock | A | 0–5 | | |
| 35 | 26 March | Ayr United | H | 2–0 | Troup, Bell | 9,000 |
| 36 | 2 April | Albion Rovers | A | 3–2 | McLean, Bell, Troup | |
| 37 | 4 April | Greenock Morton | A | 0–1 | | |
| 38 | 9 April | Motherwell | H | 2–1 | Cowan, Bell | 12,000 |
| 39 | 11 April | Clydebank | H | 2–0 | Bell, Kilpatrick | 12,000 |
| 40 | 16 April | Airdrieonians | A | 1–1 | Bell | |
| 41 | 23 April | St Mirren | A | 2–0 | Bell (2) | 11,000 |
| 42 | 30 April | Clyde | A | 2–5 | J. Jackson, Thomson | |

=== League table ===
| Pos | Team | Pld | W | D | L | GF | GA | GD | Pts |
|---|---|---|---|---|---|---|---|---|---|
| 2 | Celtic | 42 | 30 | 6 | 6 | 89 | 31 | +58 | 66 |
| 3 | Heart of Midlothian | 42 | 20 | 10 | 12 | 74 | 49 | +25 | 50 |
| 4 | Dundee | 42 | 19 | 11 | 12 | 54 | 48 | +6 | 49 |
| 5 | Motherwell | 42 | 19 | 10 | 13 | 75 | 51 | +24 | 48 |
| 6 | Partick Thistle | 42 | 17 | 12 | 13 | 53 | 39 | +14 | 46 |

== Scottish Cup ==
Statistics provided by Dee Archive.

| Match day | Date | Opponent | H/A | Score | Dundee scorer(s) | Attendance |
|---|---|---|---|---|---|---|
| 1st round | 22 January | Caledonian | H | 8–1 | T. Jackson, Nicoll, Troup, Thomson, McLean, Philip (3) | 18,000 |
| 2nd round | 5 February | Stenhousemuir | H | 1–0 | Bell | 16,000 |
| 3rd round | 19 February | Aberdeen | H | 0–0 | | 27,000 |
| 3R replay | 23 February | Aberdeen | A | 1–1 | Hutton (o.g.) | 20,000 |
| 3R 2nd replay | 1 March | Aberdeen | N | 2–0 | Philip, Troup | 15,000 |
| Quarter-finals | 5 March | Albion Rovers | H | 0–2 | | 13,000 |

== Player statistics ==
Statistics provided by Dee Archive

| No. | Pos | Nat | Player | Total | | First Division | | Scottish Cup | |
| No. | Pos | Nat | Player | Apps | Goals | Apps | Goals | Apps | Goals |
|---|---|---|---|---|---|---|---|---|---|
| | FW | (Scotland) SCO | John Bell | 40 | 26 | 36 | 25 | 4 | 1 |
| | FW | (Scotland) SCO | Willie Cowan | 20 | 2 | 17 | 2 | 3 | 0 |
| | FW | (Scotland) SCO | John Davidson | 2 | 0 | 2 | 0 | 0 | 0 |
| | DF | (Scotland) SCO | Tom Fleming | 12 | 0 | 11 | 0 | 1 | 0 |
| | GK | (Scotland) SCO | Tom Gibbon | 48 | 0 | 42 | 0 | 6 | 0 |
| | FW | (England) ENG | Billy Hogg | 2 | 1 | 2 | 1 | 0 | 0 |
| | FW | (England) ENG | John Honeyman | 13 | 1 | 12 | 1 | 1 | 0 |
| | MF | (Scotland) SCO | Davie Hutcheson | 19 | 0 | 16 | 0 | 3 | 0 |
| | MF | (Ireland) EIR | Sam Irving | 40 | 1 | 35 | 1 | 5 | 0 |
| | FW | (Scotland) SCO | John Jackson | 43 | 1 | 37 | 1 | 6 | 0 |
| | FW | (England) ENG | Tom Jackson | 5 | 3 | 3 | 2 | 2 | 1 |
| | MF | (Scotland) SCO | Jock Johnstone | 7 | 1 | 6 | 1 | 1 | 0 |
| | FW | (Scotland) SCO | Tom Kilpatrick | 27 | 1 | 22 | 1 | 5 | 0 |
| | FW | (Scotland) SCO | Dave McDonald | 13 | 1 | 13 | 1 | 0 | 0 |
| | FW | (Scotland) SCO | Willie McLean | 37 | 8 | 31 | 7 | 6 | 1 |
| | MF | (Scotland) SCO | Dave Nicol | 31 | 2 | 28 | 1 | 3 | 1 |
| | FW | (Scotland) SCO | George Philip | 29 | 4 | 26 | 0 | 3 | 4 |
| | DF | (Scotland) SCO | David Raitt | 42 | 0 | 37 | 0 | 5 | 0 |
| | FW | (Scotland) SCO | Isaac Reid | 6 | 0 | 6 | 0 | 0 | 0 |
| | FW | (England) ENG | Donald Slade | 6 | 0 | 6 | 0 | 0 | 0 |
| | DF | (Scotland) SCO | David Thomson | 41 | 5 | 35 | 4 | 6 | 1 |
| | FW | (Scotland) SCO | Alec Troup | 45 | 8 | 39 | 6 | 6 | 2 |

== See also ==
- List of Dundee F.C. seasons
