= 1952–53 Dundee F.C. season =

Dundee
1952–53 season
- Manager: George Anderson
- Division A: 7th
- Scottish Cup: 2nd round
- League Cup: Champions
- Top goalscorer: League: Bobby Flavell (14); All: Bobby Flavell (25)
Home colours	Alternate colours

The 1952–53 season was the fifty-first season in which Dundee competed at a Scottish national level, playing in Division A, where the club would finish in 7th place.

Dundee would also compete in both the Scottish Cup and the Scottish League Cup. Dundee would become the first Scottish team to win the League Cup in consecutive seasons, with a late Bobby Flavell double giving them a 2–0 win over Kilmarnock and winning them their third major honour. They would not see this success replicated in the Scottish Cup, losing at home against Rangers. The attendance for this game, 43,024, is an all-time attendance record at Dens Park.

At the beginning of the season, Dundee would try out a unique navy-and-white quartered home kit per the request of manager George Anderson, but proved highly unpopular with both players and fans. When Anderson took ill in September 1952 and his assistant Reg Smith took over coaching duties temporarily, the team agreed to switch back to their traditional navy shirt, with the addition of navy stripes on the shorts and red socks.

== Scottish Division A ==
Statistics provided by Dee Archive.

Match day	Date	Opponent	H/A	Score	Dundee scorer(s)	Attendance
1	6 September	Motherwell	H	0–0		24,000
2	20 September	Aberdeen	H	3–1	Flavell, Burrell, Harris (o.g.)	23,000
3	27 September	Clyde	A	1–1	Christie	12,000
4	11 October	Raith Rovers	A	1–1	A. Henderson	11,000
5	18 October	Heart of Midlothian	H	2–1	Cowie, A. Henderson	21,000
6	1 November	East Fife	A	2–3	Flavell, Steel	14,000
7	8 November	St Mirren	H	0–0		16,500
8	15 November	Hibernian	A	0–3		25,000
9	22 November	Third Lanark	A	0–0		6,000
10	29 November	Airdrieonians	H	0–2		13,000
11	6 December	Partick Thistle	H	6–0	Flavell (2), Stables, Steel (3)	15,500
12	13 December	Celtic	A	0–5		25,000
13	20 December	Motherwell	A	1–2	Flavell	9,000
14	27 December	Queen of the South	H	0–0		15,000
15	1 January	Aberdeen	A	2–2	Flavell (2)	21,000
16	3 January	Clyde	H	4–1	Burrell (2), Flavell, Hill	18,000
17	10 January	Falkirk	A	1–2	Flavell	8,000
18	17 January	Raith Rovers	H	2–3	Steel, Boyd	22,500
19	31 January	Heart of Midlothian	A	1–1	A. Henderson	20,581
20	14 February	Rangers	H	1–1	Ziesing	24,000
21	21 February	East Fife	H	1–1	Burrell	23,000
22	28 February	St Mirren	A	0–0		14,000
23	7 March	Hibernian	H	2–0	Flavell, Steel	30,000
24	14 March	Falkirk	H	2–1	Boyd, Steel	15,000
25	18 March	Third Lanark	H	3–0	Boyd, Flavell, Toner	6,500
26	21 March	Airdrieonians	A	1–2	Flavell	6,000
27	28 March	Partick Thistle	A	3–0	A. Henderson, Steel, Flavell	1,200
28	4 April	Celtic	H	4–0	Flavell, Toner, A. Henderson (2)	28,000
29	18 April	Queen of the South	A	0–1		10,000
30	2 May	Rangers	A	1–3	Gallacher	60,000

=== League table ===
Pos	Team	Pld	W	D	L	GF	GA	GR	Pts
5	Clyde	30	13	4	13	78	78	1.000	30
6	St Mirren	30	11	8	11	52	58	0.897	30
7	Dundee	30	9	11	10	44	37	1.189	29
8	Celtic	30	11	7	12	51	54	0.944	29
9	Partick Thistle	30	10	9	11	55	63	0.873	29

Source: RSSSF

== Scottish League Cup ==
Statistics provided by Dee Archive.

=== Group 4 ===
Match day	Date	Opponent	H/A	Score	Dundee scorer(s)	Attendance
1	9 August	Raith Rovers	H	2–1	Burrell, Christie	20,000
2	13 August	Airdrieonians	A	3–1	Flavell (3)	12,000
3	16 August	Clyde	H	2–2	Flavell, Steel	21,000
4	23 August	Raith Rovers	A	2–1	Steel (2)	17,000
5	27 August	Airdrieonians	H	3–2	Flavell (2), Toner	19,000
6	30 August	Clyde	A	3–3	Christie, Boyd, Toner	18,000

==== Group 4 table ====
Team	Pld	W	D	L	GF	GA	GR	Pts
Dundee	6	4	2	0	15	10	1.500	10
Clyde	6	1	3	2	15	15	1.000	5
Raith Rovers	6	2	1	3	9	14	0.643	5
Airdrieonians	6	1	2	3	9	9	1.000	4

=== Knockout stage ===
Match day	Date	Opponent	H/A	Score	Dundee scorer(s)	Attendance
Quarter-finals, 1st leg	13 September	Stirling Albion	A	1–3	Burrell	8,000
Quarter-finals, 2nd leg	17 September	Stirling Albion	H	5–0	Flavell (2), Steel (2), Boyd	24,000
Dundee won 6–3 on aggregate
Semi-finals	4 October	Hibernian	N	2–1	Steel, Flavell	44,200
Final	25 October	Kilmarnock	N	2–0	Flavell 82', 87'	51,827

== Scottish Cup ==
Statistics provided by Dee Archive.

Match day	Date	Opponent	H/A	Score	Dundee scorer(s)	Attendance
2nd round	7 February	Rangers	H	0–2		43,024

== Player statistics ==
Statistics provided by Dee Archive

No.	Pos	Nat	Player	Total		Division A		Scottish Cup		League Cup	
No.	Pos	Nat	Player	Apps	Goals	Apps	Goals	Apps	Goals	Apps	Goals
	MF	(Scotland) SCO	Alfie Boyd	31	5	22	3	1	0	8	2
	GK	(Scotland) SCO	Bill Brown	9	0	8	0	1	0	0	0
	FW	(Northern Ireland) NIR	Gerry Burrell	20	6	14	4	1	0	5	2
	FW	(Scotland) SCO	George Christie	24	3	13	1	1	0	10	2
	DF	(Canada) CAN	Jack Cowan	36	0	26	0	1	0	9	0
	MF	(Scotland) SCO	Doug Cowie	39	1	29	1	1	0	9	0
	FW	(Scotland) SCO	Bobby Flavell	38	25	27	14	1	0	10	11
	DF	(Scotland) SCO	Gerry Follon	32	0	24	0	1	0	7	0
	DF	(Scotland) SCO	Gordon Frew	12	0	8	0	0	0	4	0
	MF	(Scotland) SCO	Tommy Gallacher	29	1	24	1	1	0	4	0
	FW	(Scotland) SCO	Albert Henderson	26	6	22	6	0	0	4	0
	GK	(Scotland) SCO	Bobby Henderson	32	0	22	0	0	0	10	0
	MF	(Scotland) SCO	Robert Henderson	3	0	3	0	0	0	0	0
	FW	(Scotland) SCO	George Hill	10	1	10	1	0	0	0	0
	DF	(Scotland) SCO	Andy Irvine	5	0	5	0	0	0	0	0
	FW	(Scotland) SCO	Jack Johnsen	1	0	1	0	0	0	0	0
	DF	(Scotland) SCO	Alan Massie	1	0	1	0	0	0	0	0
	FW	(Scotland) SCO	George Merchant	5	0	3	0	0	0	2	0
	FW	(Scotland) SCO	Ian Stables	6	1	6	1	0	0	0	0
	FW	(Scotland) SCO	Billy Steel	33	14	22	8	1	0	10	6
	FW	(Scotland) SCO	Jimmy Toner	25	4	16	2	1	0	8	2
	FW	(Scotland) SCO	Bert Walker	1	0	1	0	0	0	0	0
	MF	(South Africa) RSA	Ken Ziesing	33	1	23	1	0	0	10	0

== See also ==
- List of Dundee F.C. seasons
