= 1955–56 Dundee F.C. season =

Dundee
1955–56 season
- Manager: Willie Thornton
- Division One: 13th
- Scottish Cup: 6th round
- League Cup: Group Stage
- Top goalscorer: League: George Merchant (12); All: George Merchant (14)
Home colours

The 1955–56 season was the fifty-fourth season in which Dundee competed at a Scottish national level, playing in Division One, where the club would finish in 13th place. Dundee would also compete in both the Scottish Cup and the Scottish League Cup. They would be knocked out of the group stages of the League Cup, and would be defeated by Rangers in the 6th round of the Scottish Cup.

== Scottish Division One ==
Statistics provided by Dee Archive.

Match day	Date	Opponent	H/A	Score	Dundee scorer(s)	Attendance
1	10 September	Heart of Midlothian	A	0–4		26,000
2	17 September	Dunfermline Athletic	H	3–0	A. Henderson, Ritchie (2)	11,000
3	24 September	Aberdeen	A	0–2		20,000
4	1 October	Clyde	H	2–1	Chalmers, Malloy	13,000
5	8 October	Dunfermline Athletic	A	1–2	Gallacher	7,000
6	15 October	Raith Rovers	H	6–3	Smith (4), Malloy, Chalmers	13,000
7	22 October	Kilmarnock	A	0–0		12,000
8	29 October	Falkirk	H	0–0		11,000
9	5 November	Airdrieonians	A	3–3	Ritchie (2), Anderson	8,000
10	12 November	Celtic	H	1–2	Malloy	24,000
11	19 November	Partick Thistle	A	2–1	Smith, Ritchie	12,000
12	26 November	East Fife	H	1–0	Smith	12,500
13	3 December	Queen of the South	H	3–0	Stables (2), Smith	10,000
14	10 December	Hibernian	A	3–6	Merchant, Smith, Christie	7,000
15	17 December	St Mirren	H	5–1	Stables, Smith, Merchant (2), Christie	8,000
16	24 December	Stirling Albion	A	0–0		5,000
17	31 December	Motherwell	H	2–1	A. Henderson, Stables	13,000
18	2 January	Aberdeen	H	2–4	Christie, Merchant	29,000
19	7 January	Rangers	A	1–3	Ritchie	46,000
20	14 January	Heart of Midlothian	H	0–2		17,000
21	21 January	Clyde	A	1–4	Christie	6,000
22	11 February	Raith Rovers	A	1–1	O'Hara	8,000
23	25 February	Kilmarnock	H	1–1	A. Henderson	11,000
24	3 March	Falkirk	A	1–3	Stables	10,000
25	10 March	Airdrieonians	H	1–3	O'Hara	11,000
26	17 March	Celtic	A	0–1		25,000
27	24 March	Partick Thistle	H	3–0	Merchant, Gallacher (2)	7,500
28	31 March	East Fife	A	4–5	Merchant (3), O'Hara	6,000
29	2 April	Rangers	H	0–3		18,500
30	7 April	Queen of the South	A	1–2	Merchant	5,500
31	13 April	Stirling Albion	H	2–1	Merchant, O'Hara	4,000
32	21 April	St Mirren	H	1–3	Christie	7,000
33	23 April	Hibernian	H	3–2	Merchant (2), Christie	10,000
34	28 April	Motherwell	A	2–1	Cousin, O'Hara	8,000

=== League table ===
Pos	Team	Pld	W	D	L	GF	GA	GR	Pts
11	Raith Rovers	34	12	9	13	58	75	0.773	33
12	East Fife	34	13	5	16	61	69	0.884	31
13	Dundee	34	12	6	16	56	65	0.862	30
14	Falkirk	34	11	6	17	58	75	0.773	28
15	St Mirren	34	10	7	17	57	70	0.814	27

Source: RSSSF

== Scottish League Cup ==
Statistics provided by Dee Archive.

=== Group 1 ===
Match day	Date	Opponent	H/A	Score	Dundee scorer(s)	Attendance
1	13 August	Airdrieonians	A	0–4		10,000
2	17 August	Kilmarnock	H	1–2	Anderson	16,000
3	20 August	St Mirren	H	2–0	Chalmers, Anderson	16,000
4	27 August	Airdrieonians	H	2–2	Chalmers, McIvor	15,000
5	31 August	Kilmarnock	A	0–0		15,000
6	3 September	St Mirren	A	3–0	Roy, Ritchie (2)	15,000

==== Group 1 table ====
Team	Pld	W	D	L	GF	GA	GR	Pts
St Mirren	6	3	1	2	10	9	1.111	7
Kilmarnock	6	2	3	1	7	7	1.000	7
Dundee	6	2	2	2	8	8	1.000	6
Airdrieonians	6	1	2	3	13	14	0.929	4

== Scottish Cup ==
Statistics provided by Dee Archive.

Match day	Date	Opponent	H/A	Score	Dundee scorer(s)	Attendance
5th round	4 February	Dundee United	A	2–2	Stables, Merchant	20,000
5R replay	8 February	Dundee United	H	3–0	Merchant, Stables, Anderson	17,000
6th round	18 February	Rangers	H	0–1		42,500

== Player statistics ==
Statistics provided by Dee Archive

No.	Pos	Nat	Player	Total		Division One		Scottish Cup		League Cup	
No.	Pos	Nat	Player	Apps	Goals	Apps	Goals	Apps	Goals	Apps	Goals
	FW	(Scotland) SCO	Johnny Anderson	5	2	3	1	0	0	2	1
	FW	(Scotland) SCO	Billy Birse	2	0	2	0	0	0	0	0
	MF	(Scotland) SCO	Gordon Black	36	0	32	0	3	0	1	0
	GK	(Scotland) SCO	Bill Brown	38	0	31	0	1	0	6	0
	FW	(Scotland) SCO	George Carmichael	1	0	1	0	0	0	0	0
	FW	(Scotland) SCO	Jimmy Chalmers	19	4	13	2	0	0	6	2
	FW	(Scotland) SCO	George Christie	40	6	31	6	3	0	6	0
	FW	(Scotland) SCO	Alan Cousin	6	1	6	1	0	0	0	0
	MF	(Scotland) SCO	Doug Cowie	36	0	27	0	3	0	6	0
	MF	(Scotland) SCO	Willie Craig	8	0	7	0	0	0	1	0
	FW	(Scotland) SCO	Davie Dunsmuir	3	0	0	0	0	0	3	0
	FW	(Scotland) SCO	Dave Easson	1	0	1	0	0	0	0	0
	MF	(Scotland) SCO	Tommy Gallacher	26	3	18	3	3	0	5	0
	DF	(Scotland) SCO	Davie Gray	15	0	8	0	2	0	5	0
	FW	(Scotland) SCO	Albert Henderson	30	5	21	3	3	1	6	1
	GK	(Scotland) SCO	Bobby Henderson	5	0	3	0	2	0	0	0
	DF	(Scotland) SCO	Andy Irvine	41	0	32	0	3	0	6	0
	DF	(Scotland) SCO	Danny Malloy	18	3	13	3	0	0	5	0
	FW	(Scotland) SCO	Arthur McIvor	6	1	3	0	0	0	3	1
	FW	(Scotland) SCO	George Merchant	24	14	20	12	3	2	1	0
	FW	(Scotland) SCO	George O'Hara	13	5	12	5	1	0	0	0
	DF	(Scotland) SCO	Hugh Reid	29	0	27	0	1	0	1	0
	FW	(Scotland) SCO	Billy Ritchie	13	8	12	6	0	0	1	2
	FW	(Scotland) SCO	Joe Roy	7	1	4	0	2	0	1	1
	FW	(Scotland) SCO	Ivor Smith	16	9	15	9	0	0	1	0
	FW	(Scotland) SCO	Davie Sneddon	1	0	1	0	0	0	0	0
	FW	(Scotland) SCO	Ian Stables	23	7	20	5	3	2	0	0
	FW	(Scotland) SCO	Jimmy Stevenson	10	0	10	0	0	0	0	0
	FW	(Scotland) SCO	Jim Watt	1	0	1	0	0	0	0	0

== See also ==
- List of Dundee F.C. seasons
