= 1956–57 Dundee F.C. season =

Dundee
1956–57 season
- Manager: Willie Thornton
- Division One: 10th
- Scottish Cup: 5th round
- League Cup: Semi-finals
- Top goalscorer: League: George O'Hara & Jimmy Chalmers (9); All: Jimmy Chalmers (14)
Home colours

The 1956–57 season was the fifty-fifth season in which Dundee competed at a Scottish national level, playing in Division One, where the club would finish in 10th place. Dundee would also compete in both the Scottish Cup and the Scottish League Cup. They would be knocked out by Clyde in the 5th round of the Scottish Cup via replay, but would make it to the Semi-finals of the League Cup before being defeated in a replay by Partick Thistle. The club's home shirt would change collar-style, from button-up to V-neck, with white arm borders and red socks returning, while the navy short borders were removed.

== Scottish Division One ==
Statistics provided by Dee Archive.

Match day	Date	Opponent	H/A	Score	Dundee scorer(s)	Attendance
1	8 September	Kilmarnock	H	1–1	Merchant	13,000
2	22 September	Aberdeen	H	4–2	Christie (2), Chalmers, O'Hara	20,000
3	29 September	Heart of Midlothian	A	1–2	Birse	30,000
4	13 October	Queen of the South	A	1–3	Watt	7,500
5	20 October	Queen's Park	H	3–1	O'Hara, Watt, Chalmers	8,500
6	3 November	Celtic	H	2–1	Black, O'Hara	24,000
7	10 November	Hibernian	A	1–1	Watt	12,000
8	17 November	St Mirren	A	3–2	Christie, Watt (2)	9,000
9	24 November	Airdrieonians	H	2–1	Christie, Watt	7,000
10	1 December	Falkirk	A	1–1	O'Hara	6,000
11	8 December	Dunfermline Athletic	H	2–0	Christie, Merchant	11,000
12	15 December	Ayr United	H	5–0	Cousin (3), Watt, O'Hara	8,500
13	22 December	East Fife	A	0–2		3,500
14	29 December	Raith Rovers	A	2–1	Christie, Reid	16,000
15	1 January	Aberdeen	A	1–2	Chalmers	20,000
16	2 January	Rangers	H	1–3	O'Hara	28,500
17	5 January	Kilmarnock	A	0–4		13,000
18	12 January	Heart of Midlothian	H	0–3		20,000
19	19 January	Motherwell	A	2–4	Chalmers, Birse	10,000
20	26 January	Queen of the South	H	5–2	Chalmers (3), Birse (2)	9,000
21	9 February	Queen's Park	A	0–2		10,000
22	16 February	Ayr United	A	1–0	Cousin	8,000
23	23 February	Partick Thistle	H	5–1	Cousin (2), Chalmers (2), Birse	5,000
24	2 March	Dunfermline Athletic	A	1–1	Birse	6,000
25	6 March	Celtic	A	1–1	O'Hara	4,000
26	9 March	Hibernian	H	0–3		13,000
27	16 March	St Mirren	H	1–1	Cousin	10,000
28	20 March	Rangers	A	0–4		25,000
29	23 March	Airdrieonians	A	2–3	Cousin, O'Hara	7,000
30	30 March	Falkirk	H	1–2	O'Hara	10,000
31	8 April	Motherwell	H	3–1	Easson (2), Sneddon	7,000
32	20 April	East Fife	H	0–1		3,000
33	23 April	Partick Thistle	A	0–5		6,000
34	27 April	Raith Rovers	H	3–0	Cowie, Black, Easson	7,000

=== League table ===
Pos	Team	Pld	W	D	L	GF	GA	GR	Pts
8	Partick Thistle	34	13	8	13	53	51	1.039	34
9	Hibernian	34	12	9	13	69	56	1.232	33
10	Dundee	34	13	6	15	55	61	0.902	32
11	Airdrieonians	34	13	4	17	77	89	0.865	30
12	St Mirren	34	12	6	16	58	72	0.806	30

Source: RSSSF

== Scottish League Cup ==
Statistics provided by Dee Archive.

=== Group 1 ===
Match day	Date	Opponent	H/A	Score	Dundee scorer(s)	Attendance
1	11 August	Motherwell	A	1–0	Christie	10,000
2	15 August	Raith Rovers	H	1–0	Merchant	16,000
3	18 August	Airdrieonians	H	3–1	Merchant, Christie, Chalmers	13,000
4	25 August	Motherwell	H	2–1	Merchant (2)	15,000
5	29 August	Raith Rovers	A	2–2	Black, Merchant	8,500
6	1 September	Airdrieonians	A	7–1	Merchant (2), Cowie, O'Hara (2), Chalmers, Shanks (o.g.)	6,000

==== Group 1 table ====
Team	Pld	W	D	L	GF	GA	GR	Pts
Dundee	6	5	1	0	16	5	3.200	11
Raith Rovers	6	3	1	2	12	10	1.200	7
Motherwell	6	2	0	4	12	10	1.200	4
Airdrieonians	6	1	0	5	9	24	0.375	2

=== Knockout stage ===
Match day	Date	Opponent	H/A	Score	Dundee scorer(s)	Attendance
Quarter-finals, 1st leg	12 September	Dundee United	H	7–3	Black, Christie, Chalmers (3), O'Hara, Merchant	20,000
Quarter-finals, 2nd leg	15 September	Dundee United	A	1–2	Merchant	14,000
Dundee won 8–5 on aggregate
Semi-finals	6 October	Partick Thistle	N	0–0		22,000
SF Replay	9 October	Partick Thistle	N	2–3	Christie, O'Hara	18,000

== Scottish Cup ==
Statistics provided by Dee Archive.

Match day	Date	Opponent	H/A	Score	Dundee scorer(s)	Attendance
5th round	2 February	Clyde	H	0–0		22,000
5R replay	6 February	Clyde	A	1–2	Cowie	12,000

== Player statistics ==
Statistics provided by Dee Archive

No.	Pos	Nat	Player	Total		Division One		Scottish Cup		League Cup	
No.	Pos	Nat	Player	Apps	Goals	Apps	Goals	Apps	Goals	Apps	Goals
	MF	(Scotland) SCO	Dougie Alexander	1	0	1	0	0	0	0	0
	FW	(Scotland) SCO	Billy Birse	17	6	16	6	1	0	0	0
	MF	(Scotland) SCO	Gordon Black	40	4	33	2	1	0	6	2
	GK	(Scotland) SCO	Bill Brown	43	0	31	0	2	0	10	0
	FW	(Scotland) SCO	George Carmichael	1	0	1	0	0	0	0	0
	FW	(Scotland) SCO	Jimmy Chalmers	44	14	32	9	2	0	10	5
	FW	(Scotland) SCO	George Christie	44	10	32	6	2	0	10	4
	FW	(Scotland) SCO	Alan Cousin	25	8	23	8	2	0	0	0
	MF	(Scotland) SCO	Doug Cowie	29	3	17	1	2	1	10	1
	DF	(Scotland) SCO	Bobby Cox	30	0	28	0	2	0	0	0
	FW	(Scotland) SCO	Dave Easson	7	3	3	3	0	0	4	0
	GK	(Scotland) SCO	Jimmy Ferguson	2	0	2	0	0	0	0	0
	DF	(Scotland) SCO	Jim Ferguson	5	0	5	0	0	0	0	0
	FW	(Scotland) SCO	Albert Henderson	40	0	28	0	2	0	10	0
	DF	(Scotland) SCO	Andy Irvine	12	0	3	0	0	0	9	0
	FW	(Scotland) SCO	George McGeachie	4	0	4	0	0	0	0	0
	MF	(Scotland) SCO	Ralph McKenzie	42	0	30	0	2	0	10	0
	GK	(Scotland) SCO	Dave MacLaren	1	0	1	0	0	0	0	0
	FW	(Scotland) SCO	George Merchant	13	11	3	2	0	0	10	9
	FW	(Scotland) SCO	George O'Hara	40	13	28	9	2	0	10	4
	DF	(Scotland) SCO	Hugh Reid	44	1	32	1	2	0	10	0
	FW	(Scotland) SCO	Felix Reilly	1	0	1	0	0	0	0	0
	DF	(Scotland) SCO	Ed Skinner	2	0	1	0	0	0	1	0
	MF	(Scotland) SCO	Ian Smith	3	0	3	0	0	0	0	0
	FW	(Scotland) SCO	Davie Sneddon	3	1	3	1	0	0	0	0
	MF	(Scotland) SCO	Jackie Stewart	1	0	1	0	0	0	0	0
	FW	(Scotland) SCO	Jim Watt	1	0	1	0	0	0	0	0
	DF	(Scotland) SCO	Jake Young	1	0	1	0	0	0	0	0

== See also ==
- List of Dundee F.C. seasons
