= 1945–46 Dundee F.C. season =

Dundee
1945–46 season
- Manager: George Anderson
- SFL B Division: 1st, Champions
- B Division Supp. Cup: Semi-finals
- Southern League Cup: Quarter-finals
- Victory Cup: 1st round
- Top goalscorer: League: Albert Juliussen (31); All: Albert Juliussen (42)
| Home colours | Alternate colours |

The 1945–46 season was the final season in which Dundee competed under wartime conditions, with the season beginning in the final days of World War II, which would end on 2 September 1945. Dundee were placed in the Southern Football League's B Division, and despite dominating the league and winning comfortably, they were not promoted to the top tier for the following season's resumption of the Scottish Football League. Dundee would also compete in several cups in lieu of the Scottish Cup's suspension. They would play in the Southern League Cup, the precursor to the Scottish League Cup, making it to the Quarter-finals; the B Division Supplementary Cup where they would get to the Semi-finals, and in the one-off Victory Cup where they would be knocked out in the 1st round.

For this season only, Dundee would return to wearing a white shirt and black shorts as the club's primary colours until February for the first time since the 1901–02 season, before returning to a navy jersey and wearing red socks for the first time. The likely reason for the return to white shirts was probably due to clothes rations implemented due to World War II.

== Southern Football League ==
Statistics provided by Dee Archive.

=== B Division ===
| Match day | Date | Opponent | H/A | Score | Dundee scorer(s) | Attendance |
|---|---|---|---|---|---|---|
| 1 | 11 August | East Fife | H | 2–1 | Juliussen, Ewen | 8,934 |
| 2 | 18 August | Arbroath | A | 4–1 | Hill, Ewen, Juliussen (2) | 4,000 |
| 3 | 25 August | Dumbarton | H | 5–2 | Ouchterlonie, Moir, Bowman, Anderson (2) | 8,500 |
| 4 | 1 September | Airdrieonians | A | 3–3 | Laurie, Anderson, McKenzie | 6,000 |
| 5 | 8 September | Dundee United | H | 1–0 | Ouchterlonie | 12,341 |
| 6 | 15 September | Alloa Athletic | A | 1–0 | Anderson | 3,000 |
| 7 | 22 September | Stenhousemuir | A | 5–1 | Hill (2), Anderson, Rattray (2) | 1,051 |
| 8 | 29 September | Raith Rovers | A | 5–0 | Juliussen, Ouchterlonie, Anderson, Hill | 7,000 |
| 9 | 6 October | Ayr United | H | 1–4 | Juliussen | 12,333 |
| 10 | 13 October | St Johnstone | H | 5–1 | Anderson (2), Juliussen (2), Hill | 12,679 |
| 11 | 20 October | Albion Rovers | A | 2–0 | Hill, Anderson | 3,000 |
| 12 | 27 October | Dunfermline Athletic | A | 6–0 | Ouchterlonie, Hill, Juliussen (3), Ancell | 4,000 |
| 13 | 3 November | Cowdenbeath | H | 5–0 | Anderson, Smith, Juliussen (3) | 6,214 |
| 14 | 10 November | Arbroath | H | 8–0 | Juliussen (5), Anderson, Smith, Follon | 9,500 |
| 15 | 17 November | East Fife | A | 4–1 | Follon, Anderson, Juliussen (2) | 5,000 |
| 16 | 24 November | Dumbarton | A | 1–0 | Gallacher | 5,000 |
| 17 | 1 December | Airdrieonians | H | 4–1 | Hill (2), Juliussen, Ouchterlonie | 13,349 |
| 18 | 8 December | Stenhousemuir | H | 6–1 | Hill (2), Juliussen (4) | 5,243 |
| 19 | 15 December | Alloa Athletic | H | 5–1 | Hill (4), Turnbull | 5,000 |
| 20 | 22 December | Raith Rovers | H | 7–0 | Gallacher (2), Juliussen (3), Cox, Turnbull | 6,209 |
| 21 | 29 December | Ayr United | A | 1–2 | Gallacher | 10,000 |
| 22 | 1 January | Dundee United | A | 3–2 | Juliussen, Bowman, Turnbull | 16,500 |
| 23 | 2 January | Cowdenbeath | A | 2–2 | Anderson, Hill | |
| 24 | 5 January | St Johnstone | A | 1–4 | Juliussen | 8,000 |
| 25 | 12 January | Albion Rovers | H | 2–0 | Juliussen, Turnbull | 12,226 |
| 26 | 19 January | Dunfermline Athletic | H | 3–1 | Bowman (2), Anderson | 5,269 |

=== League table ===
| Pos | Team | Pld | W | D | L | GF | GA | GD | Pts |
|---|---|---|---|---|---|---|---|---|---|
| 1 | Dundee | 26 | 21 | 2 | 3 | 92 | 28 | +64 | 44 |
| 2 | Ayr United | 26 | 15 | 4 | 7 | 69 | 43 | +26 | 34 |
| 3 | East Fife | 26 | 15 | 4 | 7 | 64 | 34 | +30 | 34 |
| 4 | Airdrieonians | 26 | 14 | 5 | 7 | 69 | 50 | +19 | 33 |
| 5 | Albion Rovers | 26 | 14 | 2 | 10 | 45 | 41 | +4 | 30 |

== B Division Supplementary Cup ==
Statistics provided by Dee Archive.

| Match day | Date | Opponent | H/A | Score | Dundee scorer(s) | Attendance |
|---|---|---|---|---|---|---|
| 1st round, 1st leg | 26 January | Cowdenbeath | A | 4–1 | Turnbull (2), Gallacher, Ancell | 8,500 |
| 1st round, 2nd leg | 2 February | Cowdenbeath | H | 2–2 | Juliussen, Anderson | 11,285 |
| Quarter-finals | 9 February | Alloa Athletic | H | 6–2 | Anderson (2), Juliussen (4) | 15,472 |
| Semi-finals | 16 February | Airdrieonians | H | 1–1 | Ouchterlonie | 22,370 |
| SF replay | 20 February | Airdrieonians | A | 1–2 | Juliussen | 15,886 |

== Southern League Cup ==
Statistics provided by Dee Archive.

=== Group Section 6 ===
| Match day | Date | Opponent | H/A | Score | Dundee scorer(s) | Attendance |
|---|---|---|---|---|---|---|
| 1 | 23 February | Stirling Albion | A | 0–2 | | 6,000 |
| 2 | 2 March | Arbroath | H | 0–0 | | 11,143 |
| 3 | 16 March | Stirling Albion | H | 8–1 | Cox (2), Juliussen (3), Turnbull, Ouchterlonie (2) | 13,315 |
| 4 | 16 February | Arbroath | A | 3–1 | Ouchterlonie, Cox, McKenzie | 9,000 |

=== Section 6 final table ===
| Team | Pld | W | D | L | GF | GA | GD | Pts |
|---|---|---|---|---|---|---|---|---|
| Dundee | 4 | 2 | 1 | 1 | 11 | 4 | +7 | 5 |
| Stirling Albion | 4 | 2 | 0 | 2 | 6 | 10 | −4 | 4 |
| Arbroath | 4 | 1 | 1 | 2 | 6 | 3 | +3 | 3 |

=== Knockout stage ===
| Match day | Date | Opponent | H/A | Score | Dundee scorer(s) | Attendance |
|---|---|---|---|---|---|---|
| Quarter-finals | 6 April | Rangers | N | 1–3 | Ouchterlonie | 45,000 |

== Victory Cup ==
Statistics provided by Dee Archive.

| Match day | Date | Opponent | H/A | Score | Dundee scorer(s) | Attendance |
|---|---|---|---|---|---|---|
| 1st round, 1st leg | 20 April | Hibernian | A | 0–3 | | 18,500 |
| 1st round, 2nd leg | 27 April | Hibernian | H | 2–0 | Juliussen (2) | 20,000 |

== Player statistics ==
Statistics provided by Dee Archive

| No. | Pos | Nat | Player | Total | | SFL Total | | B Div. Cup | | SL Cup | | Victory Cup | |
| No. | Pos | Nat | Player | Apps | Goals | Apps | Goals | Apps | Goals | Apps | Goals | Apps | Goals |
|---|---|---|---|---|---|---|---|---|---|---|---|---|---|
| | DF | (Scotland) SCO | Bobby Ancell | 28 | 2 | 17 | 1 | 5 | 1 | 4 | 0 | 2 | 0 |
| | FW | (Scotland) SCO | Willie Anderson | 24 | 17 | 18 | 14 | 5 | 3 | 1 | 0 | 0 | 0 |
| | FW | (Scotland) SCO | Jimmy Andrews | 10 | 0 | 6 | 0 | 0 | 0 | 4 | 0 | 0 | 0 |
| | FW | (Scotland) SCO | Alec Beaton | 1 | 0 | 1 | 0 | 0 | 0 | 0 | 0 | 0 | 0 |
| | GK | (Scotland) SCO | Reuben Bennett | 31 | 0 | 24 | 0 | 1 | 0 | 4 | 0 | 2 | 0 |
| | DF | (Scotland) SCO | Bob Bowman | 26 | 4 | 23 | 4 | 1 | 0 | 2 | 0 | 0 | 0 |
| | GK | (Scotland) SCO | Mike Clark | 2 | 0 | 2 | 0 | 0 | 0 | 0 | 0 | 0 | 0 |
| | FW | (Scotland) SCO | Archie Coats | 2 | 0 | 2 | 0 | 0 | 0 | 0 | 0 | 0 | 0 |
| | MF | (Scotland) SCO | Doug Cowie | 1 | 0 | 1 | 0 | 0 | 0 | 0 | 0 | 0 | 0 |
| | DF | (Scotland) SCO | Sammy Cox | 27 | 4 | 17 | 1 | 5 | 0 | 5 | 3 | 0 | 0 |
| | FW | (Scotland) SCO | Ernie Ewen | 2 | 2 | 2 | 2 | 0 | 0 | 0 | 0 | 0 | 0 |
| | DF | (Scotland) SCO | Gerry Follon | 7 | 2 | 4 | 2 | 0 | 0 | 1 | 0 | 2 | 0 |
| | MF | (Scotland) SCO | Tommy Gallacher | 16 | 5 | 10 | 4 | 5 | 1 | 1 | 0 | 0 | 0 |
| | MF | (Scotland) SCO | Tommy Gray | 36 | 0 | 24 | 0 | 5 | 0 | 5 | 0 | 2 | 0 |
| | FW | (Scotland) SCO | George Hill | 25 | 17 | 23 | 17 | 1 | 0 | 0 | 0 | 1 | 0 |
| | FW | (Scotland) SCO | Frank Joyner | 3 | 0 | 0 | 0 | 0 | 0 | 1 | 0 | 2 | 0 |
| | FW | (England) ENG | Albert Juliussen | 28 | 42 | 18 | 31 | 4 | 6 | 4 | 3 | 2 | 2 |
| | MF | (Scotland) SCO | John Laurie | 2 | 1 | 2 | 1 | 0 | 0 | 0 | 0 | 0 | 0 |
| | DF | (Scotland) SCO | Alex Lawrie | 4 | 0 | 3 | 0 | 0 | 0 | 0 | 0 | 1 | 0 |
| | GK | (Scotland) SCO | Johnny Lynch | 5 | 0 | 0 | 0 | 4 | 0 | 1 | 0 | 0 | 0 |
| | FW | (Scotland) SCO | John Marshall | 1 | 0 | 0 | 0 | 0 | 0 | 0 | 0 | 1 | 0 |
| | DF | (Scotland) SCO | Alec McIntosh | 16 | 0 | 6 | 0 | 5 | 0 | 4 | 0 | 1 | 0 |
| | MF | (Scotland) SCO | Gibby McKenzie | 37 | 2 | 26 | 1 | 5 | 0 | 4 | 1 | 2 | 0 |
| | FW | (Scotland) SCO | Billy Moir | 2 | 1 | 2 | 1 | 0 | 0 | 0 | 0 | 0 | 0 |
| | FW | (Scotland) SCO | Kinnaird Ouchterlonie | 34 | 10 | 24 | 5 | 4 | 1 | 5 | 4 | 1 | 0 |
| | FW | (Scotland) SCO | Peter Rattray | 8 | 2 | 5 | 2 | 0 | 0 | 3 | 0 | 0 | 0 |
| | FW | (England) ENG | Reg Smith | 17 | 2 | 16 | 2 | 0 | 0 | 0 | 0 | 1 | 0 |
| | MF | (Scotland) SCO | Harry Sneddon | 1 | 0 | 0 | 0 | 0 | 0 | 0 | 0 | 1 | 0 |
| | FW | (Scotland) SCO | George Stewart | 1 | 0 | 0 | 0 | 0 | 0 | 0 | 0 | 1 | 0 |
| | FW | (Scotland) SCO | Alexander Stirling | 2 | 0 | 2 | 0 | 0 | 0 | 0 | 0 | 0 | 0 |
| | FW | (England) ENG | Ronnie Turnbull | 17 | 7 | 9 | 4 | 4 | 2 | 4 | 1 | 0 | 0 |
| | DF | (Scotland) SCO | Willie Westwater | 2 | 0 | 2 | 0 | 0 | 0 | 0 | 0 | 0 | 0 |

== See also ==
- List of Dundee F.C. seasons
