= 1915–16 Dundee F.C. season =

Dundee
1915–16 season
- Manager: William Wallace
- Stadium: Dens Park
- Division One: 8th
- Top goalscorer: Davie Brown (27)
Home colours

The 1915–16 season was the twenty-third season in which Dundee competed at a Scottish national level, playing in Division One, where they would finish in 8th place. Due to the ongoing First World War, the Scottish Cup was cancelled for the 1915–16 season.

== Scottish Division One ==
Statistics provided by Dee Archive.

Match day	Date	Opponent	H/A	Score	Dundee scorer(s)	Attendance
1	21 August	Ayr United	H	2–0	Brown, Troup	5,000
2	28 August	Greenock Morton	A	1–3	Brown	6,000
3	4 September	Motherwell	H	1–3	Fisher	5,00
4	11 September	Airdrieonians	A	2–1	Troup, Stirling	
5	18 September	Celtic	H	0–2		12,000
6	25 September	Queen's Park	H	7–1	Brown (5), Troup (2)	7,000
7	2 October	Dumbarton	A	1–1	Fisher	
8	9 October	St Mirren	H	1–0	Troup	4,000
9	16 October	Clyde	A	0–2		
10	23 October	Third Lanark	H	1–0	Brown	5,000
11	30 October	Falkirk	A	0–2		
12	6 November	Heart of Midlothian	H	1–0	Brown	5,000
13	13 November	Kilmarnock	A	0–2		
14	20 November	Aberdeen	A	0–2		6,000
15	27 November	Hamilton Academical	H	3–1	McCulloch, Brown, McIntosh	
16	4 December	Partick Thistle	A	0–2		
17	11 December	Motherwell	A	0–3		
18	18 December	Raith Rovers	H	3–0	Stirling, McCulloch (2)	6,000
19	25 December	Hibernian	A	2–0	Brown (2)	3,000
20	1 January	Aberdeen	H	1–1	Brown	10,000
21	3 January	Airdrieonians	H	4–0	Brown (3), Williams (o.g.)	8,000
22	8 January	Third Lanark	A	1–2	Fisher	
23	15 January	Rangers	H	2–0	Brown (2)	11,000
24	22 January	St Mirren	A	2–1	McDonald, McCulloch	
25	29 January	Clyde	H	1–0	Brown	6,000
26	5 February	Hamilton Academical	A	4–4	McCulloch, McDonald, Brown, Steven	4,000
27	12 February	Hibernian	H	2–1	Duffus, Brown	6,000
28	19 February	Partick Thistle	H	3–0	Troup, McIntosh, Steven	7,000
29	26 February	Celtic	A	0–3		10,000
30	4 March	Falkirk	H	3–3	McDonald (2), Steven	5,000
31	11 March	Ayr United	A	2–1	Brown (2)	
32	18 March	Dumbarton	H	0–1		4,000
33	1 April	Raith Rovers	A	2–0	McCulloch, Duffus	4,000
34	8 April	Kilmarnock	H	2–0	Brown (2)	3,500
35	10 April	Rangers	A	2–3	Brown (2)	5,000
36	15 April	Queen's Park	A	0–2		5,000
37	22 April	Greenock Morton	H	0–1		
38	30 April	Heart of Midlothian	A	0–1		6,500

=== League table ===
Pos	Team	Pld	W	D	L	GF	GA	GD	Pts
6	Partick Thistle	38	19	8	11	65	41	+24	46
7	Hamilton Academical	38	19	3	16	68	76	−8	41
8	Dundee	38	18	4	16	56	49	+7	40
9	Dumbarton	38	13	11	14	54	64	−10	37
10	Kilmarnock	38	12	11	15	46	49	−3	35

Source: "1915-1916 SFL - SPFL Archive". SPFL.

== Player statistics ==
Statistics provided by Dee Archive

No.	Pos	Nat	Player	Total		First Division	
No.	Pos	Nat	Player	Apps	Goals	Apps	Goals
	DF	(Scotland) SCO	Alec Aitken	16	0	16	0
	GK	(Scotland) SCO	Dave Balfour	18	0	18	0
	FW	(Scotland) SCO	Davie Brown	38	27	38	27
	DF	(Scotland) SCO	Paddy Burns	29	0	29	0
	MF	(Scotland) SCO	Bobby Duffus	25	2	25	2
	DF	(Scotland) SCO	Ernie Ferguson	31	0	31	0
	MF	(Scotland) SCO	Billy Fisher	29	3	29	3
	GK	(Scotland) SCO	Joe Fraser	20	0	20	0
	DF	(Scotland) SCO	Bob Husson	1	0	1	0
	MF	(Scotland) SCO	Joe Johnstone	1	0	1	0
	FW	(Scotland) SCO	George Lamb	11	0	11	0
	FW	(Scotland) SCO	Tom McCulloch	33	6	33	6
	MF	(Scotland) SCO	Roy McDonald	37	4	37	4
	MF	(Scotland) SCO	Bert McIntosh	27	2	27	2
	FW	(Scotland) SCO	George Steven	38	3	38	3
	MF	(Scotland) SCO	John Stirling	20	2	20	2
	DF	(Scotland) SCO	David Thomson	14	0	14	0
	FW	(Scotland) SCO	Alec Troup	30	6	30	6

== See also ==
- List of Dundee F.C. seasons
