= 1914–15 Dundee F.C. season =

Dundee
1914–15 season
- Manager: William Wallace
- Stadium: Dens Park
- Division One: 14th
- Top goalscorer: Davie Brown (19)
Home colours

The 1914–15 season was the twenty-second season in which Dundee competed at a Scottish national level, playing in Division One, where they would finish in 14th place. Due to the outbreak of the First World War, the Scottish Cup was cancelled for the 1914–15 season.

== Scottish Division One ==
Statistics provided by Dee Archive.

| Match day | Date | Opponent | H/A | Score | Dundee scorer(s) | Attendance |
|---|---|---|---|---|---|---|
| 1 | 15 August | Aberdeen | H | 1–3 | Steven | 8,000 |
| 2 | 22 August | Partick Thistle | A | 1–4 | McIntosh | |
| 3 | 29 August | Hamilton Academical | H | 1–0 | Brown | 6,000 |
| 4 | 5 September | St Mirren | A | 1–0 | Brown | |
| 5 | 12 September | Rangers | H | 1–1 | Steven | 12,000 |
| 6 | 19 September | Dumbarton | A | 1–1 | Steven | |
| 7 | 26 September | Celtic | H | 1–3 | McCulloch | 12,000 |
| 8 | 3 October | Celtic | A | 0–6 | | 7,000 |
| 9 | 5 October | Dumbarton | H | 0–0 | | 5,000 |
| 10 | 10 October | Falkirk | A | 1–0 | Steven | |
| 11 | 17 October | Heart of Midlothian | H | 1–2 | Hogg | 10,000 |
| 12 | 24 October | Airdrieonians | A | 4–3 | McCann, McDonald, Hutcheson, Stirling | |
| 13 | 31 October | Kilmarnock | A | 0–1 | | |
| 14 | 7 November | Greenock Morton | A | 0–2 | | |
| 15 | 14 November | Motherwell | H | 1–0 | McCann | 2,000 |
| 16 | 21 November | Hibernian | A | 0–2 | | 1,500 |
| 17 | 28 November | Raith Rovers | A | 1–1 | Brown | |
| 18 | 5 December | Third Lanark | H | 0–0 | | 1,500 |
| 19 | 12 December | Ayr United | H | 2–3 | Adams, Cargill | 2,000 |
| 20 | 19 December | Hamilton Academical | A | 0–2 | | |
| 21 | 25 December | Third Lanark | A | 0–7 | | 2,000 |
| 22 | 26 December | Hibernian | H | 2–4 | Brown, Steven | 3,500 |
| 23 | 1 January | Aberdeen | A | 1–2 | Fisher | 6,000 |
| 24 | 2 January | Queen's Park | A | 3–0 | Brown, Steven (2) | |
| 25 | 9 January | Falkirk | H | 1–0 | Brown | 5,000 |
| 26 | 16 January | Heart of Midlothian | A | 2–3 | Brown (2) | 10,000 |
| 27 | 23 January | Greenock Morton | H | 1–1 | Brown | 7,000 |
| 28 | 30 January | Motherwell | A | 1–1 | Brown | |
| 29 | 6 February | Partick Thistle | H | 1–2 | Brown | |
| 30 | 13 February | Clyde | A | 1–1 | Fisher | |
| 31 | 23 February | St Mirren | H | 2–1 | McIntosh, Brown | 6,000 |
| 32 | 27 February | Airdrieonians | H | 2–0 | Brown (2) | 6,000 |
| 33 | 6 March | Rangers | A | 0–2 | | 6,000 |
| 34 | 20 March | Kilmarnock | A | 2–3 | Brown (2) | |
| 35 | 3 April | Queen's Park | H | 2–0 | Brown (2) | 5,000 |
| 36 | 10 April | Ayr United | A | 0–0 | | |
| 37 | 12 April | Clyde | H | 3–0 | Brown, Hutcheson, McIntosh | |
| 38 | 17 April | Raith Rovers | H | 2–0 | Hogg, Steven | 4,000 |

=== League table ===
| Pos | Team | Pld | W | D | L | GF | GA | GD | Pts |
|---|---|---|---|---|---|---|---|---|---|
| 12 | Dumbarton | 38 | 13 | 8 | 17 | 51 | 66 | −15 | 34 |
| 13 | Kilmarnock | 38 | 15 | 4 | 19 | 55 | 59 | −4 | 34 |
| 14 | Dundee | 38 | 12 | 9 | 17 | 43 | 61 | −18 | 33 |
| 15 | Aberdeen | 38 | 11 | 11 | 16 | 39 | 52 | −13 | 33 |
| 16 | Third Lanark | 38 | 10 | 12 | 16 | 51 | 57 | −6 | 32 |

== Player statistics ==
Statistics provided by Dee Archive

| No. | Pos | Nat | Player | Total | | First Division | |
| No. | Pos | Nat | Player | Apps | Goals | Apps | Goals |
|---|---|---|---|---|---|---|---|
| | FW | (Scotland) SCO | Harry Adams | 4 | 1 | 4 | 1 |
| | DF | (Scotland) SCO | Alec Aitken | 25 | 0 | 25 | 0 |
| | DF | (Scotland) SCO | William Anderson | 1 | 0 | 1 | 0 |
| | GK | (Scotland) SCO | Dave Balfour | 14 | 0 | 14 | 0 |
| | FW | (Scotland) SCO | John Barbour | 16 | 2 | 16 | 2 |
| | FW | (Scotland) SCO | Davie Brown | 28 | 19 | 28 | 19 |
| | DF | (Scotland) SCO | Paddy Burns | 16 | 0 | 16 | 0 |
| | FW | (Scotland) SCO | Dave Cargill | 16 | 1 | 16 | 1 |
| | MF | (Scotland) SCO | Billy Fisher | 16 | 2 | 16 | 2 |
| | FW | (England) ENG | Billy Hogg | 28 | 2 | 28 | 2 |
| | MF | (Scotland) SCO | Davie Hutcheson | 37 | 0 | 37 | 0 |
| | GK | (Scotland) SCO | Bill Masterton | 24 | 0 | 24 | 0 |
| | FW | (Scotland) SCO | Norman McCann | 4 | 2 | 4 | 2 |
| | FW | (Scotland) SCO | Tom McCulloch | 30 | 1 | 30 | 1 |
| | FW | (Scotland) SCO | John McDonald | 13 | 1 | 13 | 1 |
| | MF | (Scotland) SCO | Roy McDonald | 30 | 0 | 30 | 0 |
| | MF | (Scotland) SCO | Bert McIntosh | 38 | 3 | 38 | 3 |
| | FW | (England) ENG | Walter Miller | 2 | 0 | 2 | 0 |
| | FW | (Scotland) SCO | Bill Milne | 1 | 0 | 1 | 0 |
| | FW | (Scotland) SCO | Bill Montgomery | 9 | 0 | 9 | 0 |
| | FW | (Scotland) SCO | George Smith | 5 | 0 | 5 | 0 |
| | FW | (Scotland) SCO | George Steven | 32 | 8 | 32 | 8 |
| | MF | (Scotland) SCO | John Stirling | 12 | 1 | 12 | 1 |
| | DF | (Scotland) SCO | David Thomson | 33 | 0 | 33 | 0 |

== See also ==
- List of Dundee F.C. seasons
