= List of Dundee F.C. seasons =

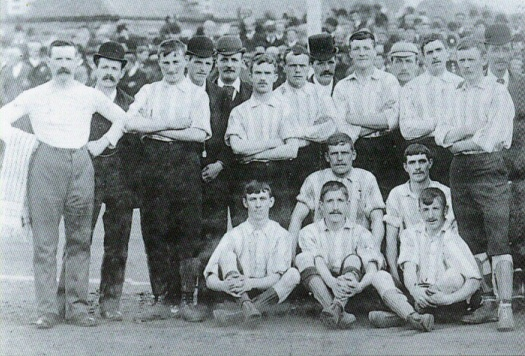
The Dundee team before the very first game against Rangers at West Craigie Park.

Dundee Football Club, is an association football club based in Dundee, Scotland. The club was formed in 1893 from the amalgamation of two local clubs Our Boys FC and East End FC and played their first competitive match in August 1893 in a Scottish Division One fixture at West Craigie Park. By the end of their debut season, Dundee had moved to a new ground, Carolina Port, where they spent five seasons before moving to their current stadium Dens Park (also known as the Scot Foam Stadium under a sponsorship) which has been their home since 1899.

The club has won a total of five major trophies, including the League Championship once, the Scottish Cup once and the Scottish League Cup three times. Dundee have also won the second tier of Scottish football five times and the Scottish Challenge Cup twice (including the inaugural tournament). The club has played in Europe on four occasions in four separate competitions: the European Cup, the UEFA Cup, the Inter-Cities Fairs Cup and the UEFA Intertoto Cup. Dundee reached the semi-finals of both the European Cup, where they beaten by eventual winners AC Milan, and the Fairs Cup where they again lost out to the winners Leeds United.

This list details the club's achievements in major competitions and the top scorers for each season where available. Top scorers in bold were also the top scorers in Dundee's division that season. Records of competitions such as the Forfarshire Cup and the Penman Cup are not included due to them being considered of less importance than the Scottish Cup, League Cup and Challenge Cup.

== Key ==
Champions	Runners-up	3rd / Semi-final	Promoted	Relegated

- Pld = Matches played
- W = Matches won
- D = Matches drawn
- L = Matches lost
- GF = Goals for
- GA = Goals against
- Pts = Points
- Pos = Final position
- SD1/SDA = Scottish Division One/A
- SD2/SDB = Scottish Division Two/B
- SFD = Scottish First Division
- SPD = Scottish Premier Division
- SPL = Scottish Premier League
- SP = Scottish Premiership
- SC = Scottish Championship
- EC = European Cup
- IFC = Inter-Cities Fairs Cup
- UC = UEFA Cup
- UIC = UEFA Intertoto Cup
- PR = Preliminary Round
- QF = Quarter-finals
- R1 = Round 1
- R2 = Round 2
- R3 = Round 3
- R4 = Round 4
- R5 = Round 5
- R6 = Round 6
- SF = Semi-finals

== Seasons ==
Season	League									Scottish Cup	League Cup	Challenge Cup	Europe	Top league goalscorer(s)	
Season	Division	Pld	W	D	L	GF	GA	Pts	Pos	Scottish Cup	League Cup	Challenge Cup	Europe	Player(s)	Goals
1893–94	SD1	18	6	3	9	47	59	15	8th	–	–	–	–	Jimmy Dundas	12
1894–95	SD1	18	6	2	10	28	33	14	8th	SF	–	–	–	Bill Sawyers	6
1895–96	SD1	18	7	2	9	33	42	16	5th	R2	–	–	–	Dave McDonald	6
1896–97	SD1	18	10	2	6	38	30	22	5th	QF	–	–	–	Dave Willocks	9
1897–98	SD1	18	5	3	10	29	36	13	7th	SF	–	–	–	Malcolm McVean	7
1898–99	SD1	18	1	2	15	23	65	4	10th	R1	–	–	–	Charlie Craig	4
1899–1900	SD1	18	4	7	7	36	39	15	6th	QF	–	–	–	Alex Robertson	9
1900–01	SD1	20	6	5	9	36	35	17	7th	QF	–	–	–	David Steven	8
1901–02	SD1	18	4	5	9	15	31	13	9th	R2	–	–	–	Jimmy Turnbull	4
1902–03	SD1	22	13	5	4	31	12	31	2nd	SF	–	–	–	Alan Bell Willie White	6
1903–04	SD1	26	13	2	11	55	46	28	5th	QF	–	–	–	Jimmy Dickson	14
1904–05	SD1	26	10	5	11	38	32	25	7th	R1	–	–	–	Dave Cowie	10
1905–06	SD1	30	11	12	7	40	33	34	7th	R1	–	–	–	Jimmy McLuckie	10
1906–07	SD1	34	18	12	4	53	26	48	2nd	R2	–	–	–	Billy Cox	18
1907–08	SD1	34	20	8	6	71	28	48	4th	R2	–	–	–	John Hunter	18
1908–09	SD1	34	22	6	6	70	32	50	2nd	R2	–	–	–	**John Hunter**	29
1909–10	SD1	34	14	8	12	52	44	36	6th	Winners	–	–	–	Jim Bellamy	13
1910–11	SD1	34	18	5	11	54	42	41	6th	SF	–	–	–	RC Hamilton	17
1911–12	SD1	34	13	9	12	52	41	35	8th	R2	–	–	–	RC Hamilton	14
1912–13	SD1	34	8	13	13	33	46	29	14th	QF	–	–	–	Andy Walker	7
1913–14	SD1	38	19	5	14	64	53	43	7th	R2	–	–	–	Billy Hogg	17
1914–15	SD1	38	12	9	17	43	61	33	15th	–	–	–	–	David Brown	19
1915–16	SD1	38	18	4	16	56	49	40	8th	–	–	–	–	David Brown	27
1916–17	SD1	38	13	4	21	58	71	30	16th	–	–	–	–	David Brown	31
Dundee didn't play competitive football between 1917 and 1919 due to World War I
1919–20	SD1	42	22	6	14	79	65	50	4th	R2	–	–	–	Johnny Bell	28
1920–21	SD1	42	19	11	12	54	48	49	4th	QF	–	–	–	Johnny Bell	25
1921–22	SD1	42	19	11	12	57	40	49	4th	R3	–	–	–	Dave Halliday	23
1922–23	SD1	38	17	7	14	51	45	41	7th	QF	–	–	–	David McLean	22
1923–24	SD1	38	15	13	10	70	57	43	5th	R2	–	–	–	**Dave Halliday**	38
1924–25	SD1	38	14	8	16	47	54	36	8th	Runners-up	–	–	–	Dave Halliday	19
1925–26	SD1	38	14	9	15	47	59	37	10th	R2	–	–	–	Andy Campbell Alec Ross	9
1926–27	SD1	38	17	9	12	77	51	43	5th	R3	–	–	–	Andy Campbell	30
1927–28	SD1	38	14	7	17	65	80	35	14th	R3	–	–	–	Gus Smith	24
1928–29	SD1	38	9	11	18	59	69	29	18th	R3	–	–	–	Gus Smith	12
1929–30	SD1	38	14	6	18	51	58	34	14th	R4	–	–	–	Andy Campbell	15
1930–31	SD1	38	17	5	16	65	63	39	8th	R3	–	–	–	Andy Campbell Jimmy Robertson	14
1931–32	SD1	38	14	10	14	61	72	38	11th	R2	–	–	–	Davie Balfour	21
1932–33	SD1	38	12	9	17	60	77	33	15th	R3	–	–	–	Jimmy Robertson	22
1933–34	SD1	38	15	6	17	68	64	36	12th	R2	–	–	–	Morgan Mackay	17
1934–35	SD1	38	16	8	14	63	63	40	8th	R1	–	–	–	Archie Coats	30
1935–36	SD1	38	11	10	17	67	80	32	12th	R3	–	–	–	Archie Coats	28
1936–37	SD1	38	12	15	11	58	69	39	9th	R3	–	–	–	Archie Coats	25
1937–38	SD1	38	13	6	19	70	74	32	19th	R1	–	–	–	Arthur Baxter	23
1938–39	SD2	34	15	7	12	99	63	37	6th	R2	–	–	–	Charlie McGillivray	29
No competitive football was played between 1939 and 1946 due to World War II
1946–47	SDB	26	21	3	2	113	30	45	1st	QF	QF^{[a]}	–	–	Albert Juliussen	30
1947–48	SDA	30	15	3	12	67	51	33	4th	R1	PR	–	–	Albert Juliussen	18
1948–49	SDA	30	20	5	5	71	48	45	2nd	SF	SF	–	–	**Alex Stott**	30
1949–50	SDA	30	12	7	11	49	46	31	6th	R1	PR	–	–	Syd Gerrie	13
1950–51	SDA	30	15	8	7	47	30	38	3rd	QF	PR	–	–	Billy Steel	7
1951–52	SDA	30	11	6	13	53	52	28	8th	Runners-up	Winners	–	–	Bobby Flavell	14
1952–53	SDA	30	9	11	10	44	37	29	7th	R2	Winners	–	–	Bobby Flavell	14
1953–54	SDA	30	14	6	10	46	47	34	7th	R3	PR	–	–	Bert Henderson	9
1954–55	SDA	30	13	4	13	48	48	30	8th	R5	PR	–	–	George Merchant	11
1955–56	SD1	34	12	6	16	56	45	30	13th	R6	PR	–	–	George Merchant	12
1956–57	SD1	34	13	6	15	55	61	32	10th	R5	SF	–	–	Jimmy Chalmers George O'Hara	9
1957–58	SD1	34	13	5	16	49	65	31	11th	R3	PR	–	–	Alan Cousin	15
1958–59	SD1	34	16	9	9	61	51	41	4th	R1	PR	–	–	Alan Cousin	17
1959–60	SD1	34	16	10	8	70	49	42	4th	R2	PR	–	–	Alan Cousin Hugh Robertson	13
1960–61	SD1	34	13	6	15	61	53	32	10th	R2	QF	–	–	Alan Gilzean	19
1961–62	SD1	34	25	4	5	80	46	54	1st	R2	PR	–	–	**Alan Gilzean**	24
1962–63	SD1	34	12	9	13	60	49	33	9th	QF	PR	–	EC – SF	Alan Gilzean	24
1963–64	SD1	34	20	5	9	94	50	45	6th	Runners-up	QF	–	–	**Alan Gilzean**	32
1964–65	SD1	34	15	10	9	86	63	40	6th	R1	PR	–	–	Andy Penman	24
1965–66	SD1	34	14	6	14	61	61	34	9th	R2	PR	–	–	Andy Penman	15
1966–67	SD1	34	16	9	9	74	51	41	6th	R1	PR	–	–	Jim McLean	13
1967–68	SD1	34	13	7	14	62	59	33	9th	R2	Runners-up	–	IFC – SF	George McLean	23
1968–69	SD1	34	10	12	12	47	48	32	9th	R1	SF	–	–	Jocky Scott	10
1969–70	SD1	34	15	6	13	49	44	36	6th	SF	PR	–	–	Gordon Wallace	22
1970–71	SD1	34	14	10	10	53	45	38	5th	QF	QF	–	–	Jocky Scott	16
1971–72	SD1	34	14	13	7	59	38	41	5th	R4	PR	–	–	Gordon Wallace	16
1972–73	SD1	34	17	9	8	68	43	43	5th	SF	QF	–	–	John Duncan	23
1973–74	SD1	34	16	7	11	67	48	39	5th	SF	Winners	–	–	Jocky Scott	22
1974–75	SD1	34	16	6	12	48	42	38	6th	SF	PR	–	–	Jocky Scott	8
1975–76	SPD	36	11	10	15	49	62	32	9th	R3	PR	–	–	Gordon Wallace	12
1976–77	SFD	39	21	9	9	90	55	51	3rd	SF	PR	–	–	**Billy Pirie**	38
1977–78	SFD	39	25	7	7	91	44	57	3rd	R3	R3	–	–	**Billy Pirie**	35
1978–79	SFD	39	24	7	8	68	36	55	1st	QF	R1	–	–	Billy Pirie Ian Redford	16
1979–80	SPD	36	10	6	20	47	73	26	9th	R3	QF	–	–	Ian Redford	9
1980–81	SFD	39	22	8	9	64	40	52	2nd	R3	Runners-Up	–	–	Eric Sinclair	19
1981–82	SPD	36	11	4	21	46	72	26	8th	QF	PR	–	–	Iain Ferguson	13
1982–83	SPD	36	9	11	16	42	53	29	6th	R4	PR	–	–	Iain Ferguson	9
1983–84	SPD	36	11	5	20	50	74	27	8th	SF	R3	–	–	Iain Ferguson	12
1984–85	SPD	36	15	7	14	48	50	37	6th	QF	QF	–	–	Ray Stephen	8
1985–86	SPD	36	14	7	15	45	51	35	6th	QF	R3	–	–	Ray Stephen	14
1986–87	SPD	44	18	12	14	74	57	48	6th	SF	QF	–	–	Graham Harvey	12
1987–88	SPD	44	17	7	20	70	64	41	7th	QF	SF	–	–	**Tommy Coyne**	33
1988–89	SPD	36	9	10	17	34	48	28	8th	R3	QF	–	–	Tommy Coyne Keith Wright	8
1989–90	SPD	36	5	14	17	41	65	24	10th	R3	R3	–	–	Billy Dodds	13
1990–91	SFD	39	22	8	9	59	33	52	3rd	QF	R2	Winners^{[b]}	–	Keith Wright	18
1991–92	SFD	44	23	12	9	80	48	58	1st	R4	R2	R1	–	Billy Dodds	19
1992–93	SPD	44	11	12	21	48	68	34	10th	R4	R3	–	–	Billy Dodds	16
1993–94	SPD	44	8	13	23	42	57	29	12th	QF	R3	–	–	Dragutin Ristić George Shaw	6
1994–95	SFD	36	20	8	8	65	36	68	5th	R4	R3	Runners-Up	–	George Shaw	16
1995–96	SFD	36	15	12	9	53	40	57	5th	R3	Runners-Up	QF	–	Jim Hamilton	14
1996–97	SFD	36	15	13	8	47	33	58	3rd	R4	SF	QF	–	Jerry O'Driscoll	10
1997–98	SFD	36	20	10	6	52	24	70	1st	QF	R3	R1	–	**James Grady**	15
1998–99	SPL	36	13	7	16	36	56	46	5th	R3	R2	–	–	Eddie Annand	9
1999–2000	SPL	36	12	5	19	45	64	41	7th	R3	QF	–	–	Willie Falconer	12
2000–01	SPL	38	13	8	17	51	49	47	6th	R4	R3	–	–	Juan Sara	15
2001–02	SPL	38	12	8	18	41	55	44	9th	R4	R3	–	UIC – R1	Juan Sara	11
2002–03	SPL	38	10	14	14	50	60	44	6th	Runners-up	R3	–	–	Steve Lovell	11
2003–04	SPL	38	12	10	16	48	57	46	7th	R3	SF	–	UC – R1	Nacho Novo	19
2004–05	SPL	38	8	9	21	37	71	33	12th	R3	R3	–	–	Steve Lovell	12
2005–06	SFD	36	9	16	11	43	50	43	7th	SF	R2	QF	–	Simon Lynch	13
2006–07	SFD	36	16	5	15	48	42	53	3rd	R3	R1	R1	–	Derek Lyle	12
2007–08	SFD	36	20	9	7	58	30	69	2nd	QF	R3	R1	–	Kevin McDonald	9
2008–09	SFD	36	13	11	12	33	32	50	4th	R4	R2	R1	–	Mickaël Antoine-Curier	14
2009–10	SFD	36	16	13	7	48	34	61	2nd	QF	QF	Winners	–	Gary Harkins	15
2010–11	SFD	36	19	12	5	54	34	44	6th^{[c]}	R4	R2	R2	–	Sean Higgins	9
2011–12	SFD	36	15	10	11	53	43	55	2nd	R4	R2	R2	–	Ryan Conroy Steven Milne	11
2012–13	SPL	38	7	9	22	28	66	30	12th	QF	R2	–	–	Ryan Conroy	6
2013–14	SC	36	21	6	9	54	26	69	1st	R4	R3	QF	–	Peter MacDonald	17
2014–15	SP	38	11	12	15	46	57	45	6th	R5	R3	–	–	Greg Stewart	13
2015–16	SP	38	11	15	12	53	57	48	8th	QF	R2	–	–	Kane Hemmings	21
2016–17	SP	38	10	7	21	38	62	37	10th	R4	GS	–	–	Marcus Haber	9
2017–18	SP	38	11	6	21	36	57	39	9th	R5	QF	–	–	Sofien Moussa	7
2018–19	SP	38	5	6	27	31	78	21	12th	R4	R2	–	–	Kenny Miller	8
2019–20	SC	27	11	8	8	32	31	41	3rd	R4	R2	R3	–	Kane Hemmings	10
2020–21	SC	27	12	9	6	49	40	45	2nd	R3	R2	–	–	Jason Cummings Osman Sow	8
2021–22	SP	38	6	11	21	34	64	29	12th	QF	QF	–	–	Danny Mullen	7
2022–23	SC	36	17	12	7	66	40	63	1st	R4	QF	SF	–	Zach Robinson	12
2023–24	SP	38	10	12	16	49	68	42	6th	R4	GS	–	–	Luke McCowan	10
2024–25	SP	38	11	8	19	57	77	41	10th	QF	QF	–	–	Simon Murray	16
2025–26	SP	38	11	9	18	42	61	42	8th	R5	GS	–	–	Simon Murray	7
2026–27	SP	13	5	2	6	18	23	17	7th	R4	R2	–	–	Bradley Fink Joe Westley	4

== Footnotes ==
a. The 1946–47 Scottish League Cup was the inaugural season of the competition.
b. The 1990–91 Scottish Challenge Cup was the inaugural season of the competition.
c. On 1 November 2010, Dundee went into administration as a result they were given a 25-point deduction as punishment.
