= 1904–05 Dundee F.C. season =

Dundee
1904–05 season
- Manager: William Wallace
- Stadium: Dens Park
- Division One: 8th
- Scottish Cup: First round
- Top goalscorer: League: Dave Cowie (10); All: Dave Cowie (10)
Home colours

The 1904–05 season was the twelfth season in which Dundee competed at a Scottish national level, playing in Division One, where they would finish in 8th place. Dundee would also compete in the Scottish Cup, where they would lose to Heart of Midlothian in the first round.

== Scottish Division One ==
Statistics provided by Dee Archive

Match day	Date	Opponent	H/A	Score	Dundee scorer(s)	Attendance
1	20 August	St Mirren	H	2–0	McAteer (2)	7,500
2	27 August	Queen's Park	A	1–0	MacFarlane	9,000
3	3 September	Airdrieonians	H	0–1		7,000
4	10 September	Rangers	H	0–3		14,760
5	17 September	Hibernian	A	1–1	Bell	7,000
6	26 September	Kilmarnock	H	3–0	Brand, MacFarlane (2)	7,000
7	1 October	Motherwell	H	2–0	McAteer, Cowie	4,500
8	8 October	St Mirren	A	1–1	Cowie	
9	15 October	Greenock Morton	H	6–1	Cowie (2), Brown (3), Bell	6,400
10	22 October	Partick Thistle	H	0–1		6,800
11	29 October	Rangers	A	1–2	MacFarlane	13,000
12	5 November	Airdrieonians	A	0–2		5,500
13	12 November	Heart of Midlothian	H	2–0	Wilson, Bell	7,300
14	19 November	Celtic	A	0–3		8,000
15	3 December	Hibernian	H	4–1	Wilson, Findlay, Cowie (2)	6,000
16	10 December	Third Lanark	H	0–0		6,000
17	17 December	Greenock Morton	A	1–5	Brand	2,000
18	26 December	Third Lanark	A	2–2	Cowie (2)	3,000
19	31 December	Port Glasgow Athletic	H	4–0	MacFarlane (2), Cowie, Brown	3,100
20	7 January	Motherwell	H	0–0		5,000
21	14 January	Celtic	H	2–1	Wilson, Brown	13,000
22	21 January	Partick Thistle	A	1–2	Brown	2,200
23	11 February	Kilmarnock	A	1–2	Jeffray	
24	25 February	Heart of Midlothian	A	1–3	Brand	4,500
25	25 March	Port Glasgow Athletic	A	0–1		
26	1 April	Queen's Park	H	3–0	Bell, Brown, Cowie	3,500

=== League table ===
Pos	Team	Pld	W	D	L	GF	GA	GD	Pts
6	Partick Thistle	26	12	2	12	36	56	−20	26
7	Heart of Midlothian	26	11	3	12	46	44	+2	25
8	Dundee	26	10	5	11	38	32	+6	25
9	Kilmarnock	26	9	5	12	29	45	−16	23
10	St Mirren	26	9	4	13	33	36	−3	22

Source: SPFL Archive

== Scottish Cup ==
Statistics provided by Dee Archive

Match day	Date	Opponent	H/A	Score	Dundee scorer(s)	Attendance
1st round	28 January	Heart of Midlothian	H	1–3	MacFarlane	14,000

== Player statistics ==
Statistics provided by Dee Archive

No.	Pos	Nat	Player	Total		First Division		Scottish Cup	
No.	Pos	Nat	Player	Apps	Goals	Apps	Goals	Apps	Goals
	FW	(Scotland) SCO	Alan Bell	25	3	24	3	1	0
	DF	(Scotland) SCO	Dickie Boyle	27	1	26	1	1	0
	FW	(Scotland) SCO	Arthur Brand	12	3	12	3	0	0
	FW	(Scotland) SCO	Tom Brown	14	7	13	7	1	0
	FW	(Scotland) SCO	Jimmy Burnett	8	0	8	0	0	0
	DF	(Scotland) SCO	John Chaplin	26	0	25	0	1	0
	FW	(Scotland) SCO	Dave Cowie	24	10	23	10	1	0
	DF	(Scotland) SCO	Johnny Darroch	1	0	1	0	0	0
	FW	(Scotland) SCO	Bob Findlay	8	1	7	1	1	0
	MF	(Scotland) SCO	Jimmy Jeffray	23	1	22	1	1	0
	FW	(Scotland) SCO	Sandy MacFarlane	25	7	24	6	1	1
	DF	(Scotland) SCO	Tom McAteer	23	3	22	3	1	0
	FW	(Scotland) SCO	Fred McDiarmid	19	0	19	0	0	0
	FW	(Scotland) SCO	John McHardy	3	0	3	0	0	0
	DF	(Scotland) SCO	John McKenzie	9	0	9	0	0	0
	DF	(Scotland) SCO	Hugh McNaught	8	0	7	0	1	0
	GK	(Scotland) SCO	Willie Muir	25	0	24	0	1	0
	GK	(Ireland) EIR	Matthew Reilly	2	0	2	0	0	0
	FW	(Scotland) SCO	Billy Thomson	5	0	5	0	0	0
	FW	(England) ENG	David Wilson	10	3	10	3	0	0

== See also ==
- List of Dundee F.C. seasons
