= 1916–17 Dundee F.C. season =

Dundee
1916–17 season
- Manager: William Wallace
- Stadium: Dens Park
- Division One: 16th
- Top goalscorer: Davie Brown (31)
Home colours

The 1915–16 season was the twenty-fourth season in which Dundee competed at a Scottish national level, playing in Division One, where they would finish in 16th place. Due to the ongoing First World War, the Scottish Cup was cancelled for the 1916–17 season. At the end of the season, due to travel difficulties during wartime, Dundee were asked to retire from the league at the end of the season.

== Scottish Division One ==
Statistics provided by Dee Archive.

Match day	Date	Opponent	H/A	Score	Dundee scorer(s)	Attendance
1	19 August	Rangers	A	0–3		10,000
2	26 August	Clyde	H	0–1		7,000
3	2 September	Motherwell	A	2–4	McCulloch, Brown	
4	9 September	Aberdeen	H	1–1	Steven	8,000
5	16 September	Hibernian	A	2–1	Herron, Troup	3,000
6	23 September	Airdrieonians	H	2–2	McDonald, Brown	5,000
7	30 September	Queen's Park	A	2–2	Brown (2)	4,000
8	7 October	Falkirk	H	1–2	Steven	6,000
9	14 October	Greenock Morton	A	0–1		
10	21 October	Hamilton Academical	H	3–1	Brown (2), McCulloch	7,000
11	28 October	Kilmarnock	A	0–3		
12	4 November	Celtic	H	1–2	Brown	14,000
13	11 November	Dumbarton	A	3–4	Brown (2), Troup	2,000
14	18 November	St Mirren	H	0–2		1,200
15	25 November	Partick Thistle	A	0–3		
16	2 December	Third Lanark	H	0–2		
17	9 December	Raith Rovers	H	6–2	Brown (6)	2,000
18	16 December	Heart of Midlothian	A	0–1		5,000
19	23 December	Airdrieonians	A	3–2	Brown (2), Steven	
20	30 December	Kilmarnock	H	0–2		4,000
21	1 January	Aberdeen	A	1–5	Brown	4,000
22	2 January	Hibernian	H	3–1	McCulloch (2), Steven	4,000
23	6 January	Falkirk	A	0–2		
24	20 January	Ayr United	H	2–1	Stirling, Brown	
25	27 January	Heart of Midlothian	H	2–3	Murray, McCulloch	4,000
26	3 February	Ayr United	A	2–1	Fisher, Brown	
27	10 February	Partick Thistle	H	5–1	Murray, Thomson (2), Brown, Stirling	5,000
28	17 February	Celtic	A	0–2		10,000
29	24 February	Greenock Morton	H	3–1	Steven, Brown (2)	4,000
30	3 March	Raith Rovers	A	2–3	McCulloch, Steven	
31	10 March	St Mirren	A	0–2		5,000
32	17 March	Dumbarton	H	4–1	Fisher, Brown (3)	5,000
33	24 March	Clyde	A	0–2		
34	31 March	Queen's Park	H	2–1	Thomson, Brown	4,000
35	7 April	Hamilton Academical	A	4–2	Herron, Brown (3)	5,000
36	14 April	Motherwell	H	0–2		4,000
37	21 April	Third Lanark	A	0–0		5,000
38	28 April	Rangers	H	2–1	Brown, Fisher	7,500

=== League table ===
Pos	Team	Pld	W	D	L	GF	GA	GD	Pts
14	Heart of Midlothian	38	14	4	20	44	59	−15	32
15	Ayr United	38	12	7	19	47	59	−12	31
16	Dundee	38	13	4	21	58	71	−13	30
16	Hibernian	38	10	10	18	57	72	−15	30
18	Queen's Park	38	11	7	20	56	81	−25	29

Source: "1916-1917 SFL - SPFL Archive". SPFL.

== Player statistics ==
Statistics provided by Dee Archive

No.	Pos	Nat	Player	Total		First Division	
No.	Pos	Nat	Player	Apps	Goals	Apps	Goals
	DF	(Scotland) SCO	Alec Aitken	10	0	10	0
	DF	(Scotland) SCO	John Baxter	10	0	10	0
	GK	(Scotland) SCO	Bob Bower	37	0	37	0
	FW	(Scotland) SCO	Davie Brown	36	31	36	31
	DF	(Scotland) SCO	Paddy Burns	23	0	23	0
	FW	(Scotland) SCO	Dave Cargill	3	0	3	0
	MF	(Scotland) SCO	Bobby Duffus	26	0	26	0
	FW	(Scotland) SCO	Dave Erskine	4	0	4	0
	DF	(Scotland) SCO	Ernie Ferguson	15	0	15	0
	MF	(Scotland) SCO	Billy Fisher	15	3	15	3
	FW	(Scotland) SCO	Jim Herron	27	2	27	2
	GK	(Scotland) SCO	Kennedy (trialist)	1	0	1	0
	FW	(Scotland) SCO	Tom McCulloch	31	6	31	6
	MF	(Scotland) SCO	Roy McDonald	14	1	14	1
	MF	(Scotland) SCO	Bert McIntosh	27	0	27	0
	FW	(Scotland) SCO	John Moyes	5	0	5	0
	FW	(Scotland) SCO	Frank Murray	21	2	21	2
	MF	(Scotland) SCO	George Murray	5	0	5	0
	FW	(Scotland) SCO	Dave Pearson	4	0	4	0
	MF	(Scotland) SCO	Bob Roberts	3	0	3	0
	FW	(Scotland) SCO	Ralph Rogerson	2	0	2	0
	FW	(Scotland) SCO	Jack Simpson	1	0	1	0
	FW	(Scotland) SCO	George Steven	26	6	26	6
	MF	(Scotland) SCO	John Stirling	31	2	31	2
	FW	(Scotland) SCO	Tommy Taylor	1	0	1	0
	DF	(Scotland) SCO	David Thomson	29	3	29	3
	FW	(Scotland) SCO	Alec Troup	11	2	11	2

== See also ==
- List of Dundee F.C. seasons
