= Bob Johnstone (goalkeeper) =

Scottish footballer

Personal information
- Full name: Robert Johnstone
- Date of birth: 6 November 1911
- Place of birth: Motherwell, Scotland
- Position: Goalkeeper

Senior career*
Years	Team	Apps	(Gls)
–	Wishaw Juniors		
1933	Blantyre Celtic		
1933–1940	Partick Thistle	204	(0)
1940–1943	Motherwell	0	(0)
- * Club domestic league appearances and goals

Robert Johnstone (born 6 November 1911) was a Scottish footballer who played as a goalkeeper; his only club at the professional level was Partick Thistle, where he spent six seasons as the regular custodian until the outbreak of World War II in 1939.

Johnstone had been brought to the Jags from the junior leagues in June 1933, a week after the previous goalkeeper, Scotland international John Jackson, was sold to Chelsea, and immediately took over the place in the first team, going on to make 255 appearances for the club in all competitions and claim winner's medals in the Glasgow Cup and Glasgow Merchants Charity Cup, both in the 1934–35 season; His position began to come under threat from the young Bobby Henderson before regular football was suspended.

During the war he moved to hometown club Motherwell, but did not make any official appearances for them before his contract expired in 1943; he also had guest spells with St Mirren and Albion Rovers.
