= John Honeyman (footballer) =

English footballer

Personal information
- Full name: John William Honeyman
- Date of birth: 29 December 1893
- Place of birth: Middlesbrough, England
- Date of death: 1972 (aged 78–79)
- Height: 5 ft 7 1/2 in (1.71 m)
- Position: Winger

Senior career*
Years	Team	Apps	(Gls)
1914–1919	Cargo Fleet & Cochrane Works		
1919–1920	Middlesbrough	1	(0)
1920–1921	Dundee		
1921–1923	Maidstone United		
1923–1924	Grimsby Town	21	(1)
1924–1926	Chatham		
1926	Margate		
1926	New Bedford Whalers		
1926	J & P Coats		
1926–1928	Maidstone United		
1928–1929	Folkestone		
1929–19??	Kreemy Works		
- * Club domestic league appearances and goals

John William Honeyman (29 December 1893 – 1972) was an English professional footballer who played as a winger.
