= Tom Fleming (footballer) =

Scottish footballer

Personal information
- Full name: Thomas Fleming
- Date of birth: 15 November 1901
- Place of birth: Scotland
- Height: 5 ft 9 1/2 in (1.77 m)
- Position: Full back

Senior career*
Years	Team	Apps	(Gls)
–1922	Dundee		
1922–1925	Fulham	111	(0)
1925–	Wigan Athletic		
- * Club domestic league appearances and goals

Thomas Fleming (15 November 1901 – ?) was a Scottish footballer who played as a full back for Dundee, Fulham and Wigan Athletic. He made 114 appearances in all competitions for Fulham between 1922 and 1925.
