= Kinnaird Ouchterlonie =

Scottish footballer

Kinnarid Ouchterlonie
Personal information
- Full name: Kinnaird Robb Richardson Ouchterlonie
- Place of birth: Dundee, Scotland
- Date of death: December , 1995
- Position: Inside forward

Youth career
- Lochee Harp

Senior career*
| Years | Team | Apps | (Gls) |
| 1939–1942 | Celtic | 0 | (0) |
| 1947–1948 | Ayr United | 14 | (4) |
| 1948 | Dundee | 1 | (0) |
| 1948–1949 | Dundee United | 9 | (2) |
- * Club domestic league appearances and goals

Kinnaird 'Ken' Robb Richardson Ouchterlonie (born in Dundee) was a Scottish footballer who played as an inside forward.

Ouchterlonie, whose brother Willie was also a footballer, began his career with local side Lochee Harp before joining Celtic just before the start of the Second World War. During the early 1940s, Ouchterlonie was not retained by the club and he featured as a trialist for Dundee United in March 1943. Ouchterlonie didn't become a signed player until September 1948, by which time he had featured for rivals Dundee and Ayr United, and made his début at inside right, playing regularly for the remainder of the year. After spending the first few months of 1949 in the reserves, Ouchterlonie was released from Tannadice Park in May 1949.

After retiring from football, Ouchterlonie ran a shoemaking and shoe repair business, and was based in the Hawkhill area of Dundee. He and his beloved wife Charlote (Lottie) Ouchterlonie, together with children Aileen, Kay and Kenneth, moved to Canvey Island in Essex. Ken joined Calor Gas as an Engineer until retiring. He died in December 1995.

== See also ==
- Dundee derby
