= Thomas Jackson (footballer, born 1896) =

English footballer

Personal information
- Full name: Thomas Jackson
- Date of birth: 1896
- Place of birth: Sunderland, England
- Position: Inside forward

Senior career*
Years	Team	Apps	(Gls)
	Sunderland West End	?	(?)
1920–1921	Burnley	1	(0)
1921	Dundee	4	(2)
- * Club domestic league appearances and goals

Thomas Jackson (1896 – after 1921) was an English professional footballer who played as an inside forward. Born in Sunderland, he started his career in non-league football with local side Sunderland West End before moving to Football League First Division club Burnley. He made one appearance for Burnley, starting in the 2–2 draw with West Bromwich Albion on 6 March 1920. He left to join Scottish outfit Dundee in January 1921 and stayed at the club for the rest of his career.
