= Bobby Williams (Scottish footballer) =

Scottish footballer (died 1916)

Personal information
- Full name: Robert Williams
- Place of birth: Ayrshire, Scotland
- Date of death: 31 August 1916
- Place of death: France
- Position: Right half

Senior career*
Years	Team	Apps	(Gls)
1910–1916	Airdrieonians	114	(10)
- * Club domestic league appearances and goals

Robert Williams was a Scottish professional footballer who made over 110 appearances in the Scottish League for Airdrieonians as a right half.

== Personal life ==
Williams enlisted as a private in the Royal Scots Fusiliers in February 1916, during the First World War. He was killed on the Western Front on 31 August 1916 and is commemorated on the Thiepval Memorial.
