= Jimmy Ferguson (footballer) =

Scottish footballer

Personal information
- Full name: James Cameron Mars Ferguson
- Date of birth: 20 February 1935 (age 91)
- Place of birth: Glasgow, Scotland
- Position: Goalkeeper

Senior career*
Years	Team	Apps	(Gls)
- Renfrew
1956–1958	Dundee	4	(0)
1958–1959	Falkirk	1	(0)
1959–1960	Oldham Athletic	36	(0)
1960–1962	Crewe Alexandra	26	(0)
1962–1963	Darlington	32	(0)
1963–1964	Stenhousemuir	8	(0)
- * Club domestic league appearances and goals

James Cameron Mars Ferguson (born 20 February 1935) is a Scottish former footballer who played in the Scottish Football League for Dundee, Falkirk and Stenhousemuir, and in the English Football League for Oldham Athletic, Crewe Alexandra and Darlington. He played as a goalkeeper. While on National Service in 1957, Ferguson played for a Scottish-based Combined Services XI.
