= Colin Buchan =

Scottish footballer

Personal information
- Full name: Colin Linwood Buchan
- Date of birth: 1890
- Place of birth: Bradford, Yorkshire, England
- Date of death: 16 April 1947 (age 56)
- Position: Inside left

Senior career*
Years	Team	Apps	(Gls)
1913–1914	Queen's Park	20	(4)
- St Bernard's
1919–1920	Dundee	6	(1)
1920–1921	Linfield		
1923–	Peebles Rovers F.C.		
- * Club domestic league appearances and goals

Colin Linwood Buchan (1890 – 16 April 1947) was a Scottish professional football outside left who played in the Scottish League for Queen's Park.

== Biography ==
Buchan was born in Bradford, Yorkshire, to Scottish parents James Buchan of Hawick, Roxburghshire and Mary Jane Buchan of Peebles, Scottish Borders. His father was a woolsorter, but they moved back to Peebles shortly after Colin's birth.

On 25 August 1914, just over three weeks after Britain's entry into the First World War, Buchan enlisted in the Royal Field Artillery. He became a Battery Quartermaster Sergeant and was wounded late in the war, but recovered and returned to football.

Buchan played in England, Scotland, and Northern Ireland, signed to play for Linfield F.C. in 1920. He returned to his hometown and played for the Peebles Rovers F.C. in 1923.

In 1933, when Billy McCandless returned to manage Dundee, he recalled of Buchan, "The last year I was with Linfield I had as a colleague one of the most gentlemanly footballers who ever kicked a ball in Ireland, Colin Buchan, who came from Dundee."

He died in 1947 and is buried at Peebles St Andrews Cemetery.

== Career statistics ==
Appearances and goals by club, season and competition
Club	Season	League			National Cup		Other		Total	
Club	Season	Division	Apps	Goals	Apps	Goals	Apps	Goals	Apps	Goals
Queen's Park	1913–14	Scottish League First Division	20	4	0	0	1 (Note: Appearance in Glasgow Cup.)	0	21	4
Dundee	1919–20	Scottish League	6	1	0	0	—		6	1
Career total			26	5	0	0	1	0	27	5
