= Jimmy Burnett =

Scottish footballer

Personal information
- Place of birth: Aberdeen, Scotland
- Position: Forward

Senior career*
Years	Team	Apps	(Gls)
1900–1901	Victoria United		
1901–1902	Aberdeen (1881)		
1902–1904	Portsmouth		
1904–1905	Dundee		
1905–1907	Grimsby Town	51	(13)
1907–1908	Brighton & Hove Albion	16	(2)
1908–1910	Leeds City	20	(2)
- * Club domestic league appearances and goals

James J. Burnett was a Scottish professional footballer who played as a forward.
