= John Bell (footballer, born 1891) =

Scottish footballer

Personal information
- Full name: John James Bell
- Date of birth: 1891
- Place of birth: Dundee, Scotland
- Date of death: Unknown
- Position: Forward

Senior career*
Years	Team	Apps	(Gls)
1919–1922	Dundee		
1922	Albion Rovers		
1922–1923	Hamilton Academical		
1923–1924	Newport County	21	(9)
1924–1926	Watford	20	(6)
- * Club domestic league appearances and goals

John James Bell (born 1891; date of death unknown) is a Scottish former professional association footballer, who played as a forward. Born in Dundee, the start of his playing career coincided with the First World War, and Bell played army football during the war. Following the resumption of peacetime football, Bell played in the Scottish Leagues for Dundee, Albion Rovers and Hamilton Academical, before moving to Wales to play for Newport County, and later to England with Hertfordshire-based Watford. He made 20 Football League and one FA Cup appearance while at Watford, scoring 6 goals.
