= Robert Duffus =

Scottish footballer

Personal information
- Full name: Robert Morrice Duncan Duffus
- Date of birth: 27 February 1891
- Place of birth: Aberdeen, Scotland
- Date of death: 19 March 1949 (aged 58)
- Place of death: Aberdeen, Scotland
- Position: Half back

Youth career
- Aberdeen Richmond

Senior career*
Years	Team	Apps	(Gls)
1915–1919	Dundee		
1919–1920	Dumbarton	34	(2)
1921–1922	Millwall		
1922–1923	Clapton Orient		
1923–1924	Accrington Stanley		
- * Club domestic league appearances and goals

Robert Morrice Duncan Duffus (27 February 1891 – 19 March 1949) was a Scottish footballer who played for Dundee, Dumbarton, Millwall, Clapton Orient and Accrington Stanley.
