= Jimmy Toner =

Scottish footballer

James Toner (23 August 1924 – 31 March 2016) was a Scottish footballer, who played for Dundee and Leeds United. He won two Scottish League Cup winner's medals with Dundee.

He was seriously injured in a coach crash on the M25 motorway near London on 4 January 2007 in which his wife Christina was killed.
