= Albert Juliussen =

English footballer

Personal information
- Full name: Albert Lawrence Juliussen
- Date of birth: 20 February 1920
- Place of birth: Blyth, Northumberland, England
- Date of death: 1 January 1982 (aged 61)
- Place of death: Dundee, Scotland
- Position: Centre forward

Senior career*
Years	Team	Apps	(Gls)
?–1938	Cramlington Black Watch		
1938–1945	Huddersfield Town		
- → Mossley (wartime)
1941–1943	→ Dundee United (wartime)		
1943–1944	→ Jeanfield Swifts (wartime)		
1944–1945	→ Dundee United (wartime)		
1945	→ Aberdeen (wartime)		
1945–1948	Dundee	42	(50)
1948	Portsmouth	7	(4)
1948–1949	Everton	10	(1)
1949–	Consett (Player-Manager)		
1951–1953	Berwick Rangers	?	(35)
1953	Dundee United	0	(0)
1954	Brechin City	3	(2)
- * Club domestic league appearances and goals

Albert Lawrence Juliussen (20 February 1920 – 1 January 1982) was an English footballer who played as a centre forward.

== Early life ==
Juliussen was born in Blyth, Northumberland, son of Norwegian parents.

== Club career ==
=== Early career ===
He began his career in 1938 as a reserve with Huddersfield Town as an apprentice, having joined them from Cramlington Black Watch as an apprentice. He also appeared twice for Mossley during the 1939–40 season.

During World War Two Juliussen was based in Perth, Scotland, as an instructor with the army, joining Dundee United initially as a triallist. His scoring record in season 1941–42 was extraordinary and in one match, against St Bernard's, he set the record for a Dundee United player with six goals in one game; he was top scorer in that season. He scored 87 goals in 73 wartime matches for the club. He also played one match (scoring one goal) as a wartime guest for Aberdeen in May 1945.

=== Dundee ===
On the eve of the 1945–46 season, Juliussen signed for Dundee with a fee of £2,000 being paid to Huddersfield. During his time with the club he scored 95 goals in 73 matches across three seasons, including 79 league goals in 53 league matches (though the first season was still within the unofficial Southern League and other associated wartime competitions). In 1945–46 and 1946–47, Dundee captured successive Scottish League 'B' Division titles, returning to the top flight for the 1947–48 season. His spell at Dens Park included scoring 13 goals (6 then 7) across two successive matches, both of which Dundee won 10–0, in March 1947.

=== Portsmouth ===
In May 1948 he signed for Portsmouth for £11,000. During his time with the club he made seven appearances, scoring four goals.

=== Everton ===
In September 1948 Juliussen joined Merseyside club Everton, making ten appearances and scoring one goal. His final competitive match for the club took place on 18 December 1948 against Newcastle during which he was injured.

He spent the following summer looking for another club in Scotland, but eventually took up the player manager position at Consett, in Durham, with a house and job provided by the club as part of the agreement.

=== Berwick Rangers ===
He then signed for Berwick Rangers of the Scottish 'C' Division in August 1951, where he scored 49 times including 35 league goals in the 1951–52 and 1952–53 seasons.

=== Return to Dundee United ===
In August 1953 he returned to Dundee United, playing in three League Cup matches that month, scoring twice in one of the matches.

=== Brechin City ===
Juliussen joined Brechin City in 1954 when they were top of 'C' Division. He scored in one of the two matches before 400 fans travelled to the last match of the season against Celtic 'A', a match which attracted an 11,000 crowd. He scored the only goal to secure the title and Division 'B' status for the club.
