= Jackie Stewart (football manager) =

Scottish footballer and manager

Jackie Stewart was a Scottish football player and manager.

Stewart played as a wing half for junior club Shettleston, then went senior with Dundee and Airdrie in the 1950s and 1960s. Stewart left Airdrie to become manager of Albion Rovers.

He had his greatest success as manager of Dumbarton, taking them from relative obscurity to the quarter-final of the Scottish League Cup, and winning the Second Division of the Scottish Football League in the 1971–72 season. During the next season, he was recruited by St Johnstone to replace Willie Ormond, who had gone on to manage Scotland. St Johnstone struggled badly in the first season (1975–76) of the Premier Division under Stewart, and he left the club in February 1976. Stewart was then appointed manager of Airdrie three weeks later. He held that position until May 1978, when he resigned in protest at the club reducing his coaching staff. After finishing with the game, he went into the motor trade although he still did some scouting work for English clubs. He died young in his forties.

== Honours ==
Dumbarton

- Scottish Second Division : 1971–72
