= Donald Slade =

English footballer

Personal information
- Full name: Donald Slade
- Date of birth: 26 November 1888
- Place of birth: Southampton, England
- Date of death: 24 March 1980 (aged 91)
- Place of death: West End, Hampshire, England
- Height: 5 ft 8 in (1.73 m)
- Position: Centre-forward

Senior career*
Years	Team	Apps	(Gls)
1908–1910	Southampton Ramblers		
1910–1912	Southampton	3	(0)
1912–1913	Lincoln City	23	(9)
1913–1914	Woolwich Arsenal	12	(4)
1914–1915	Fulham	17	(4)
1919–1920	Dundee	35	(13)
1920–1922	Ayr United		
1922–1923	Dundee United		
- * Club domestic league appearances and goals

Donald Slade (26 November 1888 – 24 March 1980) was an English footballer who played as a forward for various English clubs in the period prior to World War I, before a post-war career in Scotland.

== Football career ==
Slade was born in Southampton and attended Foundry Lane school. After leaving school, he obtained employment as a bricklayer and played as an amateur for Southampton Ramblers. He joined Southampton, then playing in the Southern League, in 1910 and soon became a prolific scorer in the reserves, equally at home in the three inside forward positions. He eventually made his first-team debut in a 2–1 defeat at Norwich City on 1 April 1911, when he played at inside-left in place of Harry Brown. His next appearance, this time at inside-right, came in a 4–0 defeat at Millwall in the last match of the season, followed by an appearance at centre-forward (replacing Henry Hamilton) at home to Leyton in the following October, when he was finally on the winning side.

Slade spent the remainder of the 1911–12 season in the reserves, scoring 23 goals. Frustrated at the lack of first-team opportunities, Slade requested a transfer, but this was denied by the Southampton directors. After an appeal to the Football Association the transfer request was granted and Slade moved on a free transfer to Lincoln City in August 1912.

After 23 Football League Second Division games for Lincoln, in which he scored nine goals, Slade was signed by Woolwich Arsenal for a fee of £1,000 in December 1913. Despite the size of the transfer fee, Slade only remained with the "Gunners" for a few months, scoring four goals from 12 appearances, before a move to Fulham in May 1914.

Slade remained at Craven Cottage until the suspension of normal football caused by the First World War. During the war, Slade returned to Southampton, where he worked in Harland & Wolff's rolling mills, maintaining the brick linings of the furnaces. He made frequent guest appearances for Southampton during the war.

Following the war, Slade moved to Scotland, where he had spells with Dundee, Ayr United and Dundee United, gaining considerable popularity with the Scottish supporters.

== Later career ==
After retiring from his football career in 1923, Slade became the manager of a pub in Troon, where he remained until 1927. He then returned south of the border, to run public houses in Reading, Flackwell Heath and Beaconsfield, before retiring to live in Marlow.

He later returned to Hampshire, living in West End, just outside Southampton, where he died in 1980, aged 91.

== Family ==
His younger brother, Reg, was also on the books of Southampton, making three appearances in 1915.
