= David Raitt =

Scottish footballer (1894–1969)

Personal information
- Full name: David Raitt
- Date of birth: 7 December 1894
- Place of birth: Buckhaven, Scotland
- Date of death: 1969 (aged 74–75)
- Position: Full back

Senior career*
Years	Team	Apps	(Gls)
1913–1914	Buckhaven Victoria		
1914–1915	Buckhaven Thistle		
1919–1922	Dundee		
1922–1928	Everton	122	(0)
1928–1929	Blackburn Rovers	4	(0)
1929	Forfar Athletic		
Total		126	(0)
- * Club domestic league appearances and goals

David Raitt (7 December 1894 – 1969) was a Scottish footballer who played in the Football League for Blackburn Rovers and Everton.
