= David Gray (footballer, born 1922) =

Scottish footballer (1922–2008)

Davie Gray
Personal information
- Full name: David Gray
- Date of birth: 8 February 1922
- Place of birth: Coupar Angus, Scotland
- Date of death: 17 May 2008 (aged 86)
- Place of death: Dundee, Scotland
- Position: Right back

Youth career
- Lochee Harp

Senior career*
Years	Team	Apps	(Gls)
1946–1947	Rangers	9	(0)
1947–1948	Preston North End	36	(0)
1948–1953	Blackburn Rovers	107	(5)
1954–1956	Dundee	20	(0)
1956–1958	Dundee United	36	(0)

Managerial career
- 1959–60: Forfar Athletic
- * Club domestic league appearances and goals

David Gray (8 February 1922 – 17 May 2008) was a Scottish professional footballer who played league football for Blackburn Rovers between 1948 and 1953, making over 200 appearances. He also played football with Preston North End and Rangers, Dundee and Dundee United in Scotland. After retirement from playing, Gray had a spell as Forfar Athletic manager.
