= Gordon Black (footballer) =

Scottish footballer (1931–2018)

Personal information
- Full name: James Gordon Black
- Date of birth: 8 July 1931
- Place of birth: Linlithgow, Scotland
- Date of death: 29 November 2018 (aged 87)
- Place of death: Livingston, Scotland
- Position: Wing half

Youth career
- Armadale Thistle

Senior career*
Years	Team	Apps	(Gls)
1948–1954	Hibernian		
1953–1956	Falkirk	39	(0)
1956–1959	Dundee	85	(4)
1958–1959	St Johnstone	6	(2)
1959–1962	Dumbarton	66	(1)
- * Club domestic league appearances and goals

James Gordon Black (8 July 1931 – 29 November 2018) was a Scottish footballer who played for Hibernian, Falkirk, Dundee, St Johnstone and Dumbarton.

Black died in Livingston, West Lothian on 29 November 2018, at the age of 87.
