= Danny Malloy (footballer) =

Scottish footballer and manager

Personal information
- Full name: Daniel Malloy
- Date of birth: 6 November 1930
- Place of birth: Longcroft, Scotland
- Date of death: 14 January 2015 (aged 84)
- Place of death: Larbert, Scotland
- Position: Defender

Youth career
- Camelon Juniors

Senior career*
Years	Team	Apps	(Gls)
1953–1955	Dundee	72	(7)
1955–1961	Cardiff City	225	(1)
1961–1962	Doncaster Rovers	42	(0)
1962–1963	Clyde	14	(0)

International career
1955	Scotland B vs A trial	1	(0)
1955	Scottish League XI	1	(0)
1956–1957	Scotland B	2	(0)

Managerial career
- 1961–1962: Doncaster Rovers (player-manager)
- * Club domestic league appearances and goals

Daniel Malloy (6 November 1930 – 14 January 2015) was a Scottish professional football player and manager.

== Career ==
Beginning his senior career at Dundee, Malloy eventually moved to Cardiff City in December 1955 for a fee of £17,000 as a replacement for Stan Montgomery. He made his debut against Charlton Athletic soon after and became a mainstay of the side for several years. He was quick in making his mark as a footballing hard man, playing against Middlesbrough on 11 January 1958 he came up against prolific striker Brian Clough. Clough had been verbally riling Malloy throughout the match and as play went towards the Middlesbrough end Malloy swung a punch at Clough leaving him sprawled out on the pitch.

Although never a prolific scorer, at Cardiff Malloy was more famed for his scoring feats at the wrong end of the field, scoring a total of fourteen own goals during his six years at the club, including netting two in one match during a 3–2 victory over Liverpool on 22 August 1959. His only league goal for the club came from the penalty spot in the 1956–57 season in a 3–1 defeat to Manchester United. He took over as captain of the side during the 1959–1960 season as Cardiff gained promotion to the top flight as runners up to Aston Villa. At the end of the season in 1961 he could not agree terms with the club and left to become player-manager of Doncaster Rovers. He spent less than one season in charge at Belle Vue as the club spent struggled against relegation, taking charge of his last match on 17 March 1962 against Darlington. He later finished his career at Clyde.

During his career, Malloy won two caps for the Scotland B side.

Danny was also the first cousin of boxer Danny Malloy.

== Managerial statistics ==
Team	Country	From	To	Record				
Team	Country	From	To	G	W	D	L	Win %
Doncaster Rovers	(England)	August 1961	March 1962	34	11	4	19	32.35
Total				34	11	4	19	32.35

== Honours ==
Cardiff City

- Welsh Cup Winner: 2

1955–56, 1958–59

- Football League Second Division Runner-up: 1

1959–60

- Welsh Cup Finalist: 1

1959–60
