= Billy Craig (footballer) =

Scottish footballer

Personal information
- Full name: William James Craig
- Date of birth: 11 September 1929
- Place of birth: Aberdeen, Scotland
- Date of death: 31 August 2011 (aged 81)
- Place of death: Aberdeen, Scotland
- Position: Wing half

Senior career*
Years	Team	Apps	(Gls)
1950–1956	Dundee	20	(0)
1956–1959	Millwall	21	(1)
Total		41	(1)
- * Club domestic league appearances and goals

William James Craig (11 September 1929 – 31 August 2011) was a Scottish footballer who played as a wing half in the Football League.
