= David Hutcheson (footballer) =

Scottish footballer (1892–1962)

Personal information
- Full name: David High Hutcheson
- Date of birth: 29 October 1892
- Place of birth: Logie Fife, Scotland
- Date of death: 1961 (aged 68–69)
- Position: Wing half

Senior career*
Years	Team	Apps	(Gls)
1912–1913	Dundee North End		
1913–1914	Stobswell		
1914–1921	Dundee		
1921–1928	South Shields	188	(4)
Total		188	(4)
- * Club domestic league appearances and goals

David High Hutcheson (29 October 1892 – 1962) was a Scottish footballer who played in the Football League for South Shields.
