= Bobby Flavell (Scottish footballer) =

Scottish footballer and manager (1921–2023)

Personal information
- Full name: Robert Wilson Flavell
- Date of birth: 1 September 1921
- Place of birth: Annathill, Scotland
- Date of death: 18 March 2005 (aged 83)
- Place of death: Airdrie, Scotland
- Height: 5 ft 6 in (1.68 m)
- Positions: Centre forward; outside right

Senior career*
Years	Team	Apps	(Gls)
- Kirkintilloch Rob Roy
1937–1947	Airdrieonians	62	(51)
1947–1950	Heart of Midlothian	69	(26)
1950	Millonarios	12	(3)
1951–1954	Dundee	68	(32)
1954–1956	Kilmarnock	38	(13)
1956–1958	St Mirren	22	(6)
Total		271	(131)

International career
1944	Scotland (wartime)	1	(0)
1947	Scottish Football League XI	2	(6)
1947	Scotland	2	(2)

Managerial career
- 1961: Ayr United
- 1961–1962: St Mirren
- 1963–1964: Ayr United
- 1965–1966: Albion Rovers
- 1969–1972: Albion Rovers
- * Club domestic league appearances and goals

Robert Wilson Flavell (1 September 1921 – 18 March 2005) was a Scottish football player and manager. His senior playing career, which was delayed by the Second World War, had its high point at Dundee, where he won two Scottish League Cup winners' medals in consecutive years. Flavell won two caps for the Scotland national football team, both in 1947. He later became a manager of Ayr United, St Mirren and Albion Rovers.

== Playing career ==
Flavell was born in Annathill, North Lanarkshire in 1921. He joined the senior game by signing for Airdrie in 1937 as a teenager, but only played two seasons before the war broke out; he had to wait until the 1946–47 season to make another league appearance. During the conflict, Flavell had made guest appearances for both Arsenal and Tottenham. When the Scottish Football League resumed in 1946, Flavell scored over a goal per game for Airdrie and won his two caps for Scotland, which convinced Heart of Midlothian to pay £10,000 to acquire his services.

Flavell again scored frequently at Hearts, but he became a football outcast on 12 June 1949 by signing for Millonarios, of the breakaway Colombian league, a move that Hearts manager Dave McLean said meant he would "never play for Hearts again". Flavell played alongside the legendary Alfredo Di Stefano in Bogota, but at the end of the Colombian season returned to Scotland in December 1950; he was punished heavily for his actions in going to Colombia, attracting far stronger sanctions than English players who had made a similar move. He was fined £150 – then a record fine for a Scottish player – and suspended from playing until May 1951. He was transfer-listed by Hearts in February 1951, before signing for Dundee in April, making his debut for the club in a Dewar Shield game against St Johnstone on 5 May 1951. Flavell scored goals in both the 1951 and 1952 Scottish League Cup Finals, which helped Dundee win the cup in successive years. He also played in the 1952 Scottish Cup Final, which ended in a 4–0 defeat by Motherwell. He also played for Kilmarnock and St Mirren before retiring as a player.

== Coaching career ==
Flavell had five stints as a manager at three clubs, starting with Ayr United in 1961. He quickly moved to St Mirren, whom he guided to the 1962 Scottish Cup Final. He briefly returned to Ayr, before having two spells at Albion Rovers. Flavell later became a director of Albion Rovers.
