= Bobby Henderson (footballer) =

Scottish footballer (1917–2006)

Personal information
- Full name: Robert Hunter Henderson
- Date of birth: 4 October 1917
- Place of birth: Maryhill, Scotland
- Date of death: 2006 (aged 88)
- Place of death: Turriff, Scotland
- Position: Goalkeeper

Senior career*
Years	Team	Apps	(Gls)
- Glasgow Perthshire
1937–1951	Partick Thistle	68	(0)
1951–1956	Dundee	52	(0)
1956–1957	Dundee United	2	(0)
Total		122	(0)
- * Club domestic league appearances and goals

Robert Hunter Henderson (4 October 1917 – 2006) was a Scottish footballer who played as a goalkeeper for Partick Thistle, Dundee and Dundee United.

Henderson made 324 appearances for Partick (the club he had supported as a boy living locally) between 1937 and 1951, but the majority were in unofficial competitions during World War II, and he had to battle for the jersey with Bob Johnstone prior to the conflict and Tom Ledgerwood after it. In his time with Dundee, he played on the losing side in the final of the Scottish Cup in 1952, but then helped the team retain the Scottish League Cup later in the same year. He came into contention for international honours (with Dundee colleague Bill Brown one of his rivals hoping to replace Jimmy Cowan who had been usual custodian for Scotland in that post-war period) but ultimately Henderson never received a cap for his country. His time as a veteran at Dundee United was spoiled by a broken leg.
