= George Hill (footballer) =

Scottish footballer and manager (1921–2002)

Personal information
- Full name: George Rennie Hill
- Date of birth: 21 March 1921
- Place of birth: Dundee, Scotland
- Date of death: 1 October 2002 (aged 80)
- Place of death: Dundee, Scotland
- Position: Left winger

Youth career
- Dundee North End

Senior career*
Years	Team	Apps	(Gls)
1940–1955	Dundee	87	(11)
1955–1956	East Fife	27	(5)
Total		114	(16)

Managerial career
- 1956–1959: Montrose
- * Club domestic league appearances and goals

George Rennie Hill (21 March 1921 – 1 October 2002) was a Scottish football player and manager, who played for Dundee and East Fife in the 1940s and 1950s. Hill played for Dundee in the 1952 Scottish Cup Final, which they lost 4–0 to Motherwell. In 1956, Hill became the first manager of Montrose. He held this position until 1959, when he was succeeded by Norman Christie.
