= Gerry Follon =

Scottish footballer (1919–1993)

Personal information
- Full name: Gerrard Follon
- Date of birth: 16 March 1919
- Place of birth: Dundee, Scotland
- Date of death: 1993 (aged 73)
- Place of death: Dundee, Scotland
- Position: Full back

Senior career*
Years	Team	Apps	(Gls)
- Lochee Harp
1946–1955	Dundee	203	(1)
1955–1957	St Johnstone	17	(0)
- Keith
Total		220	(1)

International career
1947	Scottish League XI	1	(0)
- * Club domestic league appearances and goals

Gerrard Follon (16 March 1919 – 1993) was a Scottish professional footballer who played as a full back.

== Career ==
Born in Dundee, Follon played for Lochee Harp, Dundee, St Johnstone and Keith.

Follon died in Dundee in 1993, at the age of 73.
