= Bert McIntosh =

Scottish footballer

Personal information
- Full name: Robert Anderson McIntosh
- Date of birth: 1 August 1892
- Place of birth: Dundee, Scotland
- Date of death: 1952 (aged 59–60)
- Place of death: Dundee, Scotland
- Height: 5 ft 11 in (1.80 m)
- Position: Right half

Senior career*
Years	Team	Apps	(Gls)
–	Dundee Fairfield		
1912–1920	Dundee	176	(5)
1917–1919	→ Motherwell (loan)	63	(2)
1920–1924	Newcastle United	101	(2)
1924–1925	Stockport County	8	(0)

International career
1917	Scottish League (wartime)	1	(0)
- * Club domestic league appearances and goals

Robert Anderson McIntosh (1 August 1892 – 1952) was a Scottish footballer who played for Dundee, Motherwell, Newcastle United and Stockport County, as a right half.
