= Bert Henderson =

Scottish footballer and manager

Personal information
- Full name: Albert Williamson Henderson
- Date of birth: 28 October 1931
- Place of birth: Aberdeen, Scotland
- Date of death: 30 April 2008 (aged 76)
- Place of death: Arbroath, Scotland
- Position: Inside forward

Youth career
- Forces Lads Club

Senior career*
Years	Team	Apps	(Gls)
1951–1961	Dundee	217	(47)
1961–1962	St Mirren	19	(2)
Total		236	(49)

Managerial career
- 1962–1980: Arbroath
- * Club domestic league appearances and goals

Albert "Bert" Henderson (1931–2008) was a Scottish football player and manager. Henderson attended Aberdeen Grammar School before going on to play for Dundee and St Mirren.

Henderson helped Dundee win the 1952–53 Scottish League Cup. He was transferred to St Mirren in 1961 for £2,000, but a knee injury curtailed his playing career a year later. He then became manager of Arbroath in October 1962, a position he held until January 1980. Arbroath twice won promotion to Division One during his time in charge, spending a total of four seasons in the top flight of the Scottish football league system.
