= George Merchant =

Scottish footballer

Personal information
- Date of birth: 13 May 1926
- Place of birth: Dundee, Scotland
- Date of death: 16 August 2015 (aged 89)
- Place of death: Carnoustie, Angus, Scotland
- Position: Forward

Youth career
- Dundee Stobswell
- Third Lanark
- Aberdeen

Senior career*
Years	Team	Apps	(Gls)
1951–1957	Dundee	65	(31)
1957–1958	Falkirk	23	(18)
Total		88	(49)
- * Club domestic league appearances and goals

George Merchant (13 May 1926 – 16 August 2015) was a Scottish footballer, who played for Dundee and Falkirk. Merchant scored one of the goals as Falkirk won the 1957 Scottish Cup Final. After retiring as a football player, he became a football coach at Dunfermline Athletic and set up a printing business.

On 16 August 2015, Merchant died in a nursing home in Carnoustie.
