= David Brown (footballer, born 1887) =

Scottish footballer

Personal information
- Full name: David Brown
- Date of birth: 26 November 1887
- Place of birth: Broughty Ferry, Scotland
- Date of death: 1970 (aged 83)
- Height: 5 ft 7 1/2 in (1.71 m)
- Position: Centre forward

Senior career*
| Years | Team | Apps | (Gls) |
- Dundee St Joseph's
| 1913–1917 | Dundee | 103 | (79) |
| 1917 | Greenock Morton | | |
| 1917–1919 | Rangers | 20 | (14) |
| 1919 | Dundee | 13 | (11) |
| 1919–1921 | Stoke | 50 | (17) |
| 1921–1922 | Notts County | 14 | (7) |
| 1922–1923 | Kilmarnock | 19 | (4) |
| 1923–1925 | Darlington | 97 | (74) |
| 1926–1927 | Crewe Alexandra | 37 | (21) |
| 1927–1928 | Barrow | 23 | (7) |
| Total | | 376 | (234) |
- * Club domestic league appearances and goals

David Brown (26 November 1887 – 1970) was a Scottish footballer who played extensively in both England and Scotland. He played in the Football League for Barrow, Crewe Alexandra, Darlington, Notts County and Stoke. A centre-forward, he scored 39 league goals as Darlington won the Third Division North title in 1924–25.

== Career ==
Brown played for Dundee St Joseph's, Dundee (in two spells, scoring six goals in a Scottish Football League fixture against Raith Rovers in December 1916), Greenock Morton and Peebles Rovers. During World War I he guested for Rangers, Nottingham Forest, Birmingham and Port Vale.

After the war he joined Second Division side Stoke and made an instant impact, scoring twice on his debut against Rotherham County on 1 November 1919. He then scored six goals in four matches in December and went on to become top-scorer in 1919–20 with 13. Stoke had a poor 1920–21 campaign, almost being relegated, and Brown only managed four goals in 20 matches before he was sold to Notts County. He scored seven goals in 14 Second Division games at Meadow Lane in the 1921–22 campaign.

He returned to Scotland to play for Kilmarnock in the 1922–23 season, then left Rugby Park and again moved to England with Darlington. He was a prolific striker for the "Quakers", scoring 27 goals in 1923–24 and then a club record 39 league goals in 1924–25 as Darlington won the Third Division North title. His goalscoring tally left him as the division's top-scorer for two consecutive seasons. He then departed Feethams and played for Crewe Alexandra. He scored 21 goals in 37 Third Division North appearances in the 1926–27 season in a brief stay at Gresty Road. He then spent the 1927–28 season with Barrow, before retiring to become honorary reserve team manager of former club Darlington.

== Career statistics ==
Appearances and goals by club, season and competition
| Club | Season | League | | | FA Cup | | Total | |
| Club | Season | Division | Apps | Goals | Apps | Goals | Apps | Goals |
|---|---|---|---|---|---|---|---|---|
| Stoke | 1919–20 | Second Division | 31 | 13 | 1 | 0 | 32 | 13 |
| Stoke | 1920–21 | Second Division | 19 | 4 | 1 | 0 | 20 | 4 |
| Stoke | Total | | 50 | 17 | 2 | 0 | 52 | 17 |
| Notts County | 1921–22 | Second Division | 14 | 7 | 0 | 0 | 14 | 7 |
| Darlington | 1923–24 | Third Division North | 40 | 27 | 3 | 0 | 43 | 27 |
| Darlington | 1924–25 | Third Division North | 40 | 39 | 5 | 1 | 45 | 40 |
| Darlington | 1925–26 | Third Division North | 17 | 8 | 2 | 2 | 19 | 10 |
| Darlington | Total | | 97 | 74 | 10 | 3 | 107 | 77 |
| Crewe Alexandra | 1926–27 | Third Division North | 37 | 21 | 3 | 2 | 40 | 23 |
| Barrow | 1927–28 | Third Division North | 23 | 7 | 1 | 0 | 24 | 7 |
| Career total | | | 221 | 126 | 16 | 5 | 237 | 131 |

== Honours ==
Rangers

- Scottish League: 1917–18
- Glasgow Cup: 1917–18
- Glasgow Merchants Charity Cup: 1918–19

Darlington

- Football League Third Division North: 1924–25
