= 1935–36 Dundee F.C. season =

Dundee
1935–36 season
- Manager: Billy McCandless
- Division One: 12th
- Scottish Cup: Third round
- Top goalscorer: League: Archie Coats (28); All: Archie Coats (31)
Home colours

The 1935–36 season was the forty-first season in which Dundee competed at a Scottish national level, playing in Division One, where they would finish in 12th place. Dundee would also compete in the Scottish Cup, where they were knocked out in the 3rd round by Clyde in a replay.

== Scottish Division One ==
Statistics provided by Dee Archive.

| Match day | Date | Opponent | H/A | Score | Dundee scorer(s) | Attendance |
|---|---|---|---|---|---|---|
| 1 | 10 August | Hamilton Academical | A | 2–2 | Robertson, Coats | |
| 2 | 17 August | Queen's Park | H | 6–4 | Robertson (2), Phillips, Coats (3) | 11,000 |
| 3 | 24 August | Rangers | A | 3–4 | McNaughton, Coats (2) | 18,000 |
| 4 | 28 August | Airdrieonians | A | 0–2 | | 5,000 |
| 5 | 31 August | Heart of Midlothian | H | 2–5 | Munro (o.g.), McNaughton | 16,000 |
| 6 | 7 September | St Johnstone | A | 0–2 | | 6,000 |
| 7 | 14 September | Clyde | H | 4–3 | Kirby, Phillips, Coats, Robertson | 7,000 |
| 8 | 21 September | Aberdeen | A | 1–4 | Phillips | 18,000 |
| 9 | 28 September | Queen of the South | H | 1–1 | Robertson | 7,000 |
| 10 | 5 October | Albion Rovers | A | 1–1 | McNaughton | 4,000 |
| 11 | 7 October | Third Lanark | H | 3–2 | Coats (2), McNaughton | 10,000 |
| 12 | 12 October | Kilmarnock | H | 0–0 | | 6,000 |
| 13 | 19 October | Hibernian | A | 1–2 | Kirby | 8,000 |
| 14 | 26 October | Ayr United | H | 6–1 | Kirby, Coats (2), Phillips, McNaughton, Robertson | 6,000 |
| 15 | 2 November | Celtic | A | 2–4 | Robertson, Coats | 11,000 |
| 16 | 9 November | Dunfermline Athletic | H | 2–3 | Adamson, Coats | 7,000 |
| 17 | 16 November | Partick Thistle | H | 3–3 | Robertson, McNaughton, Coats | 6,000 |
| 18 | 23 November | Arbroath | A | 0–1 | | 6,500 |
| 19 | 30 November | Motherwell | H | 2–2 | Guthrie, Coats | 6,000 |
| 20 | 7 December | Airdrieonians | H | 1–0 | Coats | 5,000 |
| 21 | 14 December | Third Lanark | A | 2–2 | Coats (2) | 3,500 |
| 22 | 21 December | Hamilton Academical | H | 3–0 | Coats, Robertson, Smith | 7,000 |
| 23 | 28 December | Queen's Park | A | 2–3 | Coats, Robertson | 6,000 |
| 24 | 1 January | Aberdeen | H | 2–2 | Coats, Phillips | 22,000 |
| 25 | 2 January | Heart of Midlothian | A | 0–3 | | 20,947 |
| 26 | 4 January | Rangers | H | 0–3 | | 23,000 |
| 27 | 11 January | St Johnstone | H | 0–2 | | 9,000 |
| 28 | 18 January | Clyde | A | 1–2 | Phillips | 8,000 |
| 29 | 1 February | Queen of the South | A | 4–3 | Coats (2), Guthrie, Robertson | 5,000 |
| 30 | 15 February | Albion Rovers | H | 2–0 | Coats (2) | 6,000 |
| 31 | 29 February | Kilmarnock | A | 1–4 | Robertson | |
| 32 | 7 March | Hibernian | H | 2–1 | Kirby, Coats | 6,000 |
| 33 | 14 March | Ayr United | A | 2–1 | Robertson, Guthrie | 6,000 |
| 34 | 21 March | Celtic | H | 0–2 | | 20,500 |
| 35 | 28 March | Dunfermline Athletic | A | 2–2 | Baxter (2) | 4,000 |
| 36 | 11 April | Partick Thistle | A | 1–1 | Coats | |
| 37 | 18 April | Arbroath | H | 3–0 | Baxter (2), Coats | 10,000 |
| 38 | 25 April | Motherwell | A | 0–3 | | 1,500 |

=== League table ===
| Pos | Team | Pld | W | D | L | GF | GA | GD | Pts |
|---|---|---|---|---|---|---|---|---|---|
| 10 | Partick Thistle | 38 | 12 | 10 | 16 | 64 | 72 | −8 | 34 |
| 11 | Arbroath | 38 | 11 | 11 | 16 | 46 | 69 | −23 | 33 |
| 12 | Dundee | 38 | 11 | 10 | 17 | 67 | 80 | −13 | 32 |
| 13 | Queen's Park | 38 | 11 | 10 | 17 | 58 | 75 | −17 | 32 |
| 14 | Dunfermline Athletic | 38 | 12 | 8 | 18 | 67 | 92 | −25 | 32 |

Source: RSSSF

== Scottish Cup ==
Statistics provided by Dee Archive.

| Match day | Date | Opponent | H/A | Score | Dundee scorer(s) | Attendance |
|---|---|---|---|---|---|---|
| 1st round | 25 January | Babcock & Wilcox | H | 6–0 | Robertson, Guthrie, Coats, Smith, Adamson (2) | 1,073 |
| 2nd round | 8 February | Airdrieonians | H | 2–1 | Coats (2) | 13,367 |
| 3rd round | 22 February | Clyde | A | 1–1 | Robertson | 20,874 |
| 3R replay | 26 February | Clyde | H | 0–3 | | 12,000 |

== Player statistics ==
Statistics provided by Dee Archive

| No. | Pos | Nat | Player | Total | | First Division | | Scottish Cup | |
| No. | Pos | Nat | Player | Apps | Goals | Apps | Goals | Apps | Goals |
|---|---|---|---|---|---|---|---|---|---|
| | MF | (Scotland) SCO | Bert Adamson | 7 | 3 | 5 | 1 | 2 | 2 |
| | FW | (Scotland) SCO | Arthur Baxter | 8 | 4 | 8 | 4 | 0 | 0 |
| | FW | (Scotland) SCO | Archie Coats | 42 | 31 | 38 | 28 | 4 | 3 |
| | MF | (Scotland) SCO | Andy Cowie | 1 | 0 | 1 | 0 | 0 | 0 |
| | DF | (Scotland) SCO | Johnny Evans | 33 | 0 | 29 | 0 | 4 | 0 |
| | DF | (Scotland) SCO | Jock Gilmour | 6 | 0 | 6 | 0 | 0 | 0 |
| | FW | (Scotland) SCO | Jimmy Guthrie | 42 | 4 | 38 | 3 | 4 | 1 |
| | MF | (Scotland) SCO | Matt Innes | 13 | 0 | 13 | 0 | 0 | 0 |
| | FW | (England) ENG | Norman Kirby | 38 | 4 | 36 | 4 | 2 | 0 |
| | DF | (Scotland) SCO | Joe Lindsay | 1 | 0 | 1 | 0 | 0 | 0 |
| | FW | (Scotland) SCO | David Linton | 2 | 0 | 2 | 0 | 0 | 0 |
| | GK | (Scotland) SCO | Johnny Lynch | 5 | 0 | 5 | 0 | 0 | 0 |
| | GK | (England) ENG | Bill Marsh | 37 | 0 | 33 | 0 | 4 | 0 |
| | FW | (Scotland) SCO | Gibson McNaughton | 18 | 6 | 18 | 6 | 0 | 0 |
| | DF | (Scotland) SCO | Lew Morgan | 3 | 0 | 3 | 0 | 0 | 0 |
| | FW | (Scotland) SCO | Willie Phillips | 30 | 6 | 26 | 6 | 4 | 0 |
| | MF | (Scotland) SCO | Albert Presdee | 2 | 0 | 2 | 0 | 0 | 0 |
| | DF | (Scotland) SCO | Bobby Rennie | 34 | 0 | 30 | 0 | 4 | 0 |
| | DF | (Wales) WAL | Len Richards | 33 | 0 | 29 | 0 | 4 | 0 |
| | FW | (Scotland) SCO | Tommy Robertson | 40 | 15 | 36 | 13 | 4 | 2 |
| | MF | (Scotland) SCO | John Russell | 16 | 0 | 13 | 0 | 3 | 0 |
| | MF | (Scotland) SCO | Tom Smith | 39 | 2 | 35 | 1 | 4 | 1 |
| | DF | (Wales) WAL | Emryss Warren | 7 | 0 | 7 | 0 | 0 | 0 |
| | MF | (Scotland) SCO | Tom Wemyss | 5 | 0 | 4 | 0 | 1 | 0 |

== See also ==
- List of Dundee F.C. seasons
