= 1932–33 Dundee F.C. season =

Dundee
1932–33 season
- Manager: Jimmy Bissett
- Division One: 15th
- Scottish Cup: Third round
- Top goalscorer: League: Jimmy Robertson (22); All: Jimmy Robertson (22)
Home colours

The 1932–33 season was the thirty-eighth season in which Dundee competed at a Scottish national level, playing in Division One, where they would finish in 15th place. Dundee would also compete in the Scottish Cup, where they were knocked out in the third round by Motherwell.

== Scottish Division One ==
Statistics provided by Dee Archive.

Match day	Date	Opponent	H/A	Score	Dundee scorer(s)	Attendance
1	13 August	Hamilton Academical	H	1–5	Balfour	
2	20 August	Queen's Park	A	0–2		
3	24 August	Motherwell	H	0–3		
4	27 August	St Johnstone	H	0–0		
5	3 September	Clyde	A	3–0	Robertson (3)	
6	10 September	Aberdeen	H	0–2		8,000
7	17 September	Heart of Midlothian	A	0–1		17,295
8	24 September	Falkirk	H	3–0	Robertson (2), Munro	
9	1 October	Greenock Morton	A	4–1	Campbell, Robertson (3)	
10	8 October	Rangers	H	0–3		6,000
11	15 October	Kilmarnock	A	2–2	Munro, Miller	
12	22 October	Cowdenbeath	A	1–4	Gilmour	
13	29 October	Airdrieonians	H	4–2	Crapnell (o.g.), Balfour, McCarthy, Guthrie	
14	5 November	Motherwell	A	1–6	Robertson	
15	12 November	Third Lanark	H	2–2	Robertson (2)	
16	19 November	St Mirren	H	1–1	Balfour	
17	26 November	Ayr United	H	1–1	Guthrie	
18	3 December	Partick Thistle	A	0–4		
19	10 December	Celtic	A	2–3	Balfour (2)	6,500
20	17 December	East Stirlingshire	H	3–0	Miller, Balfour (2)	
21	24 December	Hamilton Academical	A	2–1	Balfour (2)	
22	26 December	Third Lanark	A	1–1	Robertson	
23	31 December	Queen's Park	H	2–1	Robertson, Miller	
24	2 January	Aberdeen	A	2–3	Robertson (2)	16,000
25	3 January	Heart of Midlothian	H	2–2	H. Smith, Miller	8,000
26	7 January	St Johnstone	A	1–2	Robertson	
27	14 January	Clyde	H	2–1	Gilmour, Munro	
28	28 January	Falkirk	A	0–0		
29	11 February	Greenock Morton	H	2–2	Troup, Balfour	
30	25 February	Rangers	A	4–6	McNab (2), T. Smith, H. Smith	6,000
31	11 March	Cowdenbeath	H	4–2	Robertson (2), Gilmour, Troup	
32	18 March	Airdrieonians	A	0–3		
33	25 March	St Mirren	A	1–2	Robertson	
34	29 March	Kilmarnock	H	3–0	Blyth, Miller, Troup	
35	8 April	Ayr United	A	0–6		
36	15 April	Partick Thistle	H	1–0	Guthrie	
37	22 April	Celtic	H	3–0	Robertson, Miller, H. Smith	8,000
38	29 April	East Stirlingshire	A	2–3	Robertson (2)	

=== League table ===
Pos	Team	Pld	W	D	L	GF	GA	GD	Pts
13	Third Lanark	38	14	7	17	70	80	−10	35
14	Kilmarnock	38	13	9	16	72	86	−14	35
15	Dundee	38	12	9	17	60	77	−17	33
16	Ayr United	38	13	4	21	62	95	−33	30
17	Cowdenbeath	38	10	5	23	65	111	−46	25

Source: RSSSF

== Scottish Cup ==
Statistics provided by Dee Archive.

Match day	Date	Opponent	H/A	Score	Dundee scorer(s)	Attendance
1st round	21 January	Cowdenbeath	A	1–1	Miller	
1R replay	25 January	Cowdenbeath	H	3–0	Guthrie (3)	
2nd round	1 February	Bo'ness	H	4–0	Balfour (3), Symon	5,000
3rd round	18 February	Motherwell	A	0–5		

== Player statistics ==
Statistics provided by Dee Archive

No.	Pos	Nat	Player	Total		First Division		Scottish Cup	
No.	Pos	Nat	Player	Apps	Goals	Apps	Goals	Apps	Goals
	FW	(Scotland) SCO	Jimmy Balfour	15	13	12	10	3	3
	MF	(Scotland) SCO	Willie Blyth	24	1	20	1	4	0
	DF	(Scotland) SCO	Finlay Brown	2	0	2	0	0	0
	FW	(Scotland) SCO	John Cameron	12	0	12	0	0	0
	FW	(Scotland) SCO	Andy Campbell	9	1	9	1	0	0
	GK	(Scotland) SCO	Dave Edwards	19	0	15	0	4	0
	DF	(Scotland) SCO	Jock Gilmour	40	3	36	3	4	0
	FW	(Scotland) SCO	Jimmy Guthrie	20	6	17	3	3	3
	GK	(England) ENG	Bill Marsh	23	0	23	0	0	0
	MF	(Scotland) SCO	Tom McCarthy	42	1	38	1	4	0
	MF	(Scotland) SCO	Colin McNab	18	2	17	2	1	0
	FW	(Scotland) SCO	Andy Miller	30	7	26	6	4	1
	DF	(Scotland) SCO	Lew Morgan	42	0	38	0	4	0
	FW	(Scotland) SCO	Monty Munro	33	3	30	3	3	0
	FW	(Scotland) SCO	Bill Newton	2	0	2	0	0	0
	FW	(Scotland) SCO	Jimmy Robertson	33	22	31	22	2	0
	FW	(Scotland) SCO	Harry Smith	15	3	15	3	0	0
	MF	(Scotland) SCO	Tom Smith	21	1	21	1	0	0
	MF	(Scotland) SCO	Scot Symon	40	1	36	0	4	1
	FW	(Scotland) SCO	Alec Troup	32	3	28	3	4	0

== See also ==
- List of Dundee F.C. seasons
