= 1936–37 Dundee F.C. season =

Dundee
1936–37 season
- Manager: Billy McCandless
- Division One: 9th
- Scottish Cup: Third round
- Top goalscorer: League: Archie Coats (26); All: Archie Coats (28)
Home colours

The 1936–37 season was the forty-second season in which Dundee competed at a Scottish national level, playing in Division One, where they would finish in 9th place. Dundee would also compete in the Scottish Cup, where they were knocked out in the 3rd round by Clyde in a replay for the second successive season. The club would introduce navy stripes on the side of their shorts in this season.

== Scottish Division One ==
Statistics provided by Dee Archive.

Match day	Date	Opponent	H/A	Score	Dundee scorer(s)	Attendance
1	8 August	Rangers	H	2–2		22,000
2	15 August	Kilmarnock	A	1–1	Coats	
3	19 August	Rangers	A	0–3		12,000
4	22 August	St Johnstone	H	3–1	Baxter (2), Phillips	16,000
5	29 August	Clyde	A	2–1	Baxter, Rennie	8,000
6	5 September	Albion Rovers	H	1–0	Coats	9,000
7	9 September	Kilmarnock	H	2–2	Coats, Rennie	9,000
8	12 September	Queen of the South	A	3–2	Coats (2), Baxter	3,000
9	19 September	Aberdeen	H	2–2	Phillips, Coats	27,000
10	26 September	Queen's Park	A	2–0	Coats (2)	8,000
11	3 October	Hamilton Academical	H	1–2	Latimer	10,000
12	10 October	Heart of Midlothian	A	0–4		20,040
13	17 October	Celtic	H	0–0		24,000
14	24 October	Dunfermline Athletic	A	4–3	Baxter, Coats (2), Guthrie	3,000
15	31 October	Partick Thistle	A	1–1	Coats	15,000
16	7 November	Arbroath	H	6–1	Phillips, Baxter, Smith, Coats (2), Fordyce (o.g.)	10,000
17	14 November	Motherwell	A	1–2	Phillips	5,000
18	21 November	Falkirk	A	0–5		9,000
19	28 November	Third Lanark	H	3–2	Kirby, Coats, Baxter	7,000
20	5 December	Hibernian	H	3–1	Kirby, Phillips, Coats	6,000
21	12 December	St Mirren	A	0–4		6,500
22	19 December	St Johnstone	A	3–3	Coats, Baxter, Kirby	7,000
23	26 December	Clyde	H	2–2	Kirby, Coats	7,000
24	1 January	Aberdeen	A	1–3	Coats	28,000
25	2 January	Heart of Midlothian	H	1–0	Coats	22,000
26	9 January	Albion Rovers	A	1–1	Coats	2,500
27	16 January	Queen of the South	H	1–3	Kirby	7,000
28	23 January	Hamilton Academical	A	1–5	Rintoul	4,000
29	6 February	Queen's Park	H	2–2	Latimer, Coats	5,000
30	20 February	Celtic	A	2–1	Coats (2)	8,000
31	6 March	Dunfermline Athletic	H	2–2	Baxter (2)	3,000
32	20 March	Arbroath	A	0–3		4,000
33	27 March	Motherwell	H	0–0		6,000
34	3 April	Falkirk	H	1–1	Coats	3,000
35	10 April	Third Lanark	A	0–4		6,000
36	12 April	Partick Thistle	H	2–2	Kirby, Baxter	3,500
37	19 April	Hibernian	A	0–0		3,000
38	24 April	St Mirren	H	4–0	Guthrie, Baxter, Coats (2)	1,200

=== League table ===
Pos	Team	Pld	W	D	L	GF	GA	GD	Pts
7	Falkirk	38	19	6	13	98	66	+32	44
8	Hamilton Academical	38	18	5	15	91	96	−5	41
9	Dundee	38	12	15	11	58	69	−11	39
10	Clyde	38	16	6	16	59	70	−11	38
11	Kilmarnock	38	14	9	15	60	70	−10	37

Source: RSSSF

== Scottish Cup ==
Statistics provided by Dee Archive.

Match day	Date	Opponent	H/A	Score	Dundee scorer(s)	Attendance
1st round	3 February	East Stirlingshire	H	4–1	Phillips (2), Baxter, Coats	5,966
2nd round	13 February	Queen's Park	H	2–0	Coats, Kirby	16,000
3rd round	27 February	Clyde	A	0–0		20,000
3R replay	3 March	Clyde	H	0–1		14,000

== Player statistics ==
Statistics provided by Dee Archive

No.	Pos	Nat	Player	Total		First Division		Scottish Cup	
No.	Pos	Nat	Player	Apps	Goals	Apps	Goals	Apps	Goals
	MF	(Scotland) SCO	Bert Adamson	1	0	1	0	0	0
	FW	(Scotland) SCO	Arthur Baxter	42	13	38	12	4	1
	FW	(Scotland) SCO	Archie Coats	42	28	38	26	4	2
	MF	(Scotland) SCO	Andy Cowie	7	0	6	0	1	0
	FW	(Scotland) SCO	Morton Dempster	1	0	1	0	0	0
	DF	(Scotland) SCO	Johnny Evans	40	0	36	0	4	0
	FW	(Scotland) SCO	Jimmy Guthrie	36	2	32	2	4	0
	MF	(Scotland) SCO	Matt Innes	3	0	3	0	0	0
	FW	(England) ENG	Norman Kirby	39	7	35	6	4	1
	MF	(Scotland) SCO	John Latimer	40	2	37	2	3	0
	MF	(Scotland) SCO	John Laurie	4	0	4	0	0	0
	FW	(Scotland) SCO	David Linton	12	0	12	0	0	0
	GK	(Scotland) SCO	Johnny Lynch	15	0	12	0	3	0
	GK	(England) ENG	Bill Marsh	27	0	26	0	1	0
	FW	(Scotland) SCO	Willie Phillips	38	7	34	5	4	2
	DF	(England) ENG	John Reddish	17	0	14	0	3	0
	DF	(Scotland) SCO	Bobby Rennie	40	2	36	2	4	0
	DF	(Wales) WAL	Len Richards	23	0	22	0	1	0
	FW	(Scotland) SCO	David Rintoul	1	1	1	1	0	0
	MF	(Scotland) SCO	Tom Smith	42	1	38	1	4	0
	MF	(Scotland) SCO	Willie Watson	2	0	2	0	0	0

== See also ==
- List of Dundee F.C. seasons
