= 1930–31 Dundee F.C. season =

Dundee
1930–31 season
- Manager: Jimmy Bissett
- Division One: 8th
- Scottish Cup: Third round
- Top goalscorer: League: Andy Campbell & Jimmy Robertson (14); All: Andy Campbell (17)
Home colours

The 1930–31 season was the thirty-sixth season in which Dundee competed at a Scottish national level, playing in Division One, where they would finish in 8th place. Dundee would also compete in the Scottish Cup, where they would make it to the 3rd round before being knocked out by Aberdeen in a replay.

== Scottish Division One ==
Statistics provided by Dee Archive.

Match day	Date	Opponent	H/A	Score	Dundee scorer(s)	Attendance
1	9 August	Clyde	H	2–1	Troup, Campbell	12,000
2	16 August	East Fife	A	2–1	Campbell, Robertson	
3	23 August	Rangers	H	0–1		22,000
4	30 August	Greenock Morton	A	1–2	Campbell	
5	6 September	Hamilton Academical	H	4–2	Ritchie, Blyth, Robertson, McNab	
6	13 September	Queen's Park	A	2–2	Campbell (2)	
7	20 September	Aberdeen	H	4–2	Campbell, Robertson (2), Ritchie	13,000
8	27 September	Hibernian	A	3–2	Ritchie, Robertson, Campbell	10,000
9	4 October	Falkirk	H	3–1	Robertson (2), Campbell	
10	11 October	Kilmarnock	A	2–1	Ritchie, Campbell	
11	18 October	Cowdenbeath	H	2–0	Troup, Robertson	
12	25 October	St Mirren	A	1–3	Ritchie	
13	1 November	Motherwell	H	2–1	McCarthy, Robertson	
14	8 November	Ayr United	A	6–2	Troup (3), Robertson (3)	
15	15 November	Airdrieonians	A	0–2		
16	22 November	Heart of Midlothian	H	1–3	Ritchie	10,000
17	6 December	Leith Athletic	H	6–0	Ritchie (3), Dempster (2), O'Hare	
18	13 December	Partick Thistle	H	0–0		
19	20 December	Clyde	A	2–2	Dempster, Troup	
20	27 December	East Fife	H	2–0	Dempster (2)	
21	1 January	Aberdeen	A	1–6	Campbell	22,000
22	3 January	Rangers	A	0–3		17,000
23	5 January	Hibernian	H	1–0	Campbell	4,000
24	10 January	Greenock Morton	H	3–0	Troup, Ritchie, Dempster	
25	24 January	Hamilton Academical	A	0–1		
26	7 February	Falkirk	A	1–4	Campbell	
27	21 February	Cowdenbeath	A	0–3		
28	28 February	Queen's Park	H	3–0	Robertson (2), Dempster	
29	7 March	Motherwell	A	0–2		
30	9 March	St Mirren	H	2–0	Campbell (2)	
31	18 March	Ayr United	H	5–2	Ritchie, Balfour (4)	
32	21 March	Airdrieonians	H	0–1		
33	25 March	Celtic	A	2–2	Troup, Balfour	12,000
34	28 March	Kilmarnock	H	0–2		
35	4 April	Heart of Midlothian	A	0–2		11,500
36	18 April	Leith Athletic	A	1–3	Balfour	
37	22 April	Celtic	H	0–0		12,000
38	25 April	Partick Thistle	A	1–4	Lynch	5,000

=== League table ===
Pos	Team	Pld	W	D	L	GF	GA	GD	Pts
6	Aberdeen	38	17	7	14	79	63	+16	41
7	Cowdenbeath	38	17	7	14	58	65	−7	41
8	Dundee	38	17	5	16	65	63	+2	39
9	Airdrieonians	38	17	5	16	59	66	−7	39
10	Hamilton Academical	38	16	5	17	59	57	+2	37

Source: "1930-1931 Division 1 - SPFL Archive". SPFL.

== Scottish Cup ==
Statistics provided by Dee Archive.

Match day	Date	Opponent	H/A	Score	Dundee scorer(s)	Attendance
1st round	17 January	Fraserburgh	H	10–1	Ritchie (2), Campbell, Gavigan, Troup, Blyth, McNab (2), Dempster (2)	
2nd round	31 January	Rangers	H	2–1	Campbell, Robertson	17,000
3rd round	14 February	Aberdeen	H	1–1	Campbell	38,099
3R replay	18 February	Aberdeen	A	0–2		28,527

== Player statistics ==
Statistics provided by Dee Archive

No.	Pos	Nat	Player	Total		First Division		Scottish Cup	
No.	Pos	Nat	Player	Apps	Goals	Apps	Goals	Apps	Goals
	FW	(Scotland) SCO	Jimmy Balfour	6	6	6	6	0	0
	MF	(Scotland) SCO	Willie Blyth	35	2	31	1	4	1
	DF	(Scotland) SCO	Finlay Brown	41	0	37	0	4	0
	FW	(Scotland) SCO	Andy Campbell	32	17	28	14	4	3
	FW	(Scotland) SCO	George Dempster	13	9	12	7	1	2
	FW	(Scotland) SCO	Peter Gavigan	33	1	29	0	4	1
	DF	(Scotland) SCO	Jock Gilmour	33	0	29	0	4	0
	MF	(Scotland) SCO	Tom Lynch	4	1	4	1	0	0
	GK	(England) ENG	Bill Marsh	40	0	36	0	4	0
	MF	(Scotland) SCO	Tom McCarthy	34	1	31	1	3	0
	MF	(Scotland) SCO	Colin McNab	35	3	31	1	4	2
	FW	(Scotland) SCO	Willie Milne	3	0	3	0	0	0
	GK	(Scotland) SCO	Tom Murray	2	0	2	0	0	0
	FW	(Scotland) SCO	Willie O'Hare	4	1	4	1	0	0
	FW	(Scotland) SCO	Harry Ritchie	35	13	31	11	4	2
	FW	(Scotland) SCO	Jimmy Robertson	35	15	32	14	3	1
	FW	(Scotland) SCO	Harry Smith	7	0	7	0	0	0
	MF	(Scotland) SCO	Scot Symon	22	0	21	0	1	0
	FW	(Scotland) SCO	Alec Troup	39	9	35	8	4	1
	MF	(Scotland) SCO	John Whyte	7	0	7	0	0	0

== See also ==
- List of Dundee F.C. seasons
