= 1931–32 Dundee F.C. season =

Dundee
1931–32 season
- Manager: Jimmy Bissett
- Division One: 11th
- Scottish Cup: Second round
- Top goalscorer: League: Jimmy Balfour (21); All: Jimmy Balfour (22)
Home colours

The 1931–32 season was the thirty-seventh season in which Dundee competed at a Scottish national level, playing in Division One, where they would finish in 11th place. Dundee would also compete in the Scottish Cup, where they were knocked out in the 2nd round by Dunfermline Athletic.

== Scottish Division One ==
Statistics provided by Dee Archive.

Match day	Date	Opponent	H/A	Score	Dundee scorer(s)	Attendance
1	8 August	Rangers	A	1–4	Craigie	40,000
2	15 August	Greenock Morton	H	2–1	Campbell (2)	
3	22 August	Hamilton Academical	A	2–6	Craigie (2)	
4	26 August	St Mirren	H	1–2	Robertson	
5	29 August	Queen's Park	H	4–0	Campbell (3), Troup	
6	2 September	Ayr United	H	2–2	Gilmour, Craigie	
7	5 September	Aberdeen	A	1–1	Craigie	17,000
8	12 September	Dundee United	H	1–1	Campbell	17,000
9	16 September	Partick Thistle	A	3–1	Campbell, Balfour, Lynch	
10	19 September	Leith Athletic	A	0–1		
11	26 September	Clyde	H	1–1	Balfour	
12	28 September	Third Lanark	H	6–3	Robertson, Campbell (2), Lynch, Balfour (2)	
13	3 October	Falkirk	A	2–5	Robertson, Balfour	
14	10 October	Kilmarnock	H	1–1	Lynch	
15	17 October	Celtic	H	2–0	Craigie (2)	18,000
16	24 October	Heart of Midlothian	A	1–3	Lynch	16,240
17	31 October	Cowdenbeath	A	0–4		
18	7 November	Airdrieonians	A	2–2	Robertson, Campbell	
19	14 November	Motherwell	H	2–2	Campbell, Balfour	
20	21 November	Third Lanark	A	1–6	Symon	
21	28 November	St Mirren	A	1–6	Balfour	
22	5 Decembder	Ayr United	A	0–1		
23	12 December	Partick Thistle	H	3–1	Balfour (3)	
24	19 December	Rangers	H	4–2	Balfour (3), Smith	16,000
25	26 December	Greenock Morton	A	1–4	McNab	
26	1 January	Aberdeen	H	0–0		14,000
27	2 January	Dundee United	A	3–0	Campbell (2), Balfour	16,000
28	9 January	Hamilton Academical	H	0–3		
29	23 January	Queen's Park	A	1–0	Balfour	
30	6 February	Clyde	A	1–0	Balfour	
31	13 February	Falkirk	H	2–0	Balfour, Smith	
32	20 February	Kilmarnock	A	0–0		
33	27 February	Celtic	A	2–0	Balfour (2)	9,000
34	5 March	Heart of Midlothian	H	1–0	Troup	4,000
35	12 March	Cowdenbeath	A	1–2	Symon	
36	19 March	Airdrieonians	H	4–1	McNab, Gavigan, Balfour (2)	
37	26 March	Motherwell	A	0–4		
38	2 April	Leith Athletic	H	2–2	Campbell, Troup	

=== League table ===
Pos	Team	Pld	W	D	L	GF	GA	GD	Pts
9	Kilmarnock	38	16	7	15	68	70	−2	39
10	Hamilton Academical	38	16	6	16	84	65	+19	38
11	Dundee	38	14	10	14	61	72	−11	38
12	Cowdenbeath	38	15	8	15	66	78	−12	38
13	Clyde	38	13	9	16	58	70	−12	35

== Scottish Cup ==
Statistics provided by Dee Archive.

Match day	Date	Opponent	H/A	Score	Dundee scorer(s)	Attendance
1st round	16 January	Greenock Morton	H	4–1	Troup, McNab, Balfour, Campbell	
2nd round	30 January	Dunfermline Athletic	A	0–1		

== Player statistics ==
Statistics provided by Dee Archive

No.	Pos	Nat	Player	Total		First Division		Scottish Cup	
No.	Pos	Nat	Player	Apps	Goals	Apps	Goals	Apps	Goals
	FW	(Scotland) SCO	Jimmy Balfour	26	22	24	21	2	1
	MF	(Scotland) SCO	Willie Blyth	19	0	19	0	0	0
	DF	(Scotland) SCO	Finlay Brown	21	0	21	0	0	0
	FW	(Scotland) SCO	Andy Campbell	39	15	37	14	2	1
	FW	(Scotland) SCO	Jim Craigie	12	7	12	7	0	0
	FW	(Scotland) SCO	Peter Gavigan	19	1	19	1	0	0
	DF	(Scotland) SCO	Jock Gilmour	34	1	32	1	2	0
	FW	(Scotland) SCO	Alex Lindsay	2	0	2	0	0	0
	MF	(Scotland) SCO	Tom Lynch	13	4	13	4	0	0
	GK	(England) ENG	Bill Marsh	39	0	37	0	2	0
	MF	(Scotland) SCO	Tom McCarthy	24	0	22	0	2	0
	MF	(Scotland) SCO	Colin McNab	34	3	32	2	2	1
	GK	(Scotland) SCO	Archie McNiven	1	0	1	0	0	0
	FW	(Scotland) SCO	Willie Milne	3	0	3	0	0	0
	DF	(Scotland) SCO	Lew Morgan	30	0	28	0	2	0
	FW	(Scotland) SCO	Monty Munro	4	0	4	0	0	0
	FW	(Scotland) SCO	Jimmy Robertson	32	4	30	4	2	0
	FW	(Scotland) SCO	Harry Smith	14	2	12	2	2	0
	MF	(Scotland) SCO	Tom Smith	2	0	2	0	0	0
	MF	(Scotland) SCO	Scot Symon	34	2	32	2	2	0
	FW	(Scotland) SCO	Alec Troup	38	4	36	3	2	1

== See also ==
- List of Dundee F.C. seasons
