= 1934–35 Dundee F.C. season =

Dundee
1934–35 season
- Manager: Billy McCandless
- Division One: 8th
- Scottish Cup: First round
- Top goalscorer: League: Archie Coats (30); All: Archie Coats (30)
Home colours

The 1934–35 season was the fortieth season in which Dundee competed at a Scottish national level, playing in Division One, where they would finish in 8th place. Dundee would also compete in the Scottish Cup, where they were knocked out in the 1st round by Motherwell. The club would change their style of collar and socks this season.

== Scottish Division One ==
Statistics provided by Dee Archive.

Match day	Date	Opponent	H/A	Score	Dundee scorer(s)	Attendance
1	11 August	Albion Rovers	H	3–2	Kirby, Coats (2)	10,000
2	18 August	Queen of the South	A	0–1		7,500
3	22 August	Dunfermline Athletic	H	1–1	Kirby	8,000
4	24 August	Rangers	H	3–2	Coats (2), Mackay	22,500
5	1 September	Heart of Midlothian	A	1–1	Rankin	21,250
6	8 September	Aberdeen	H	0–0		18,500
7	12 September	Airdrieonians	A	3–0	Coats (2), Robertson	5,000
8	15 September	Queen's Park	A	0–4		8,000
9	22 September	Hamilton Academical	H	2–1	Kirby, Coats	6,000
10	29 September	Clyde	A	2–2	Coats (2)	9,000
11	1 October	Celtic	H	0–0		18,000
12	6 October	St Johnstone	H	1–2	Coats	22,000
13	13 October	Kilmarnock	A	0–2		
14	20 October	Motherwell	A	3–5	Coats, Robertson	6,000
15	27 October	Falkirk	H	1–0	Rankin	5,500
16	3 November	St Mirren	A	1–0	Guthrie	
17	10 November	Ayr United	H	5–4	Coats (2), Rankin, Robertson, McNaughton	4,000
18	17 November	Partick Thistle	A	4–1	Coats (3), McNaughton	9,000
19	24 November	Celtic	A	0–4		13,000
20	1 December	Hibernian	H	0–2		5,000
21	8 December	Dunfermline Athletic	A	5–2	Robertson (2), Coats (2), Guthrie	5,000
22	15 December	Airdrieonians	H	2–0	Coats, McNaughton	3,500
23	22 December	Albion Rovers	A	2–1	Coats (2)	6,000
24	29 December	Queen of the South	H	5–0	Guthrie, Coats (2), Robertson, McNaughton	7,500
25	1 January	Aberdeen	A	0–3		20,000
26	2 January	Heart of Midlothian	H	1–5	McNaughton	23,500
27	5 January	Rangers	A	1–3	Robertson	14,000
28	12 January	Queen's Park	H	4–1	Guthrie, Robertson, Coats (2)	5,000
29	19 January	Hamilton Academical	A	1–1	Coats	27,000
30	2 February	Clyde	H	2–2	McNaughton, Robertson	3,000
31	16 February	St Johnstone	A	1–0	Coats	7,000
32	23 February	Motherwell	H	3–1	Coats, McNaughton, Guthrie	6,000
33	2 March	Kilmarnock	H	0–2		3,500
34	9 March	Partick Thistle	H	2–0	Mackay, Coats	3,500
35	16 March	Falkirk	A	1–1	Mackay	7,000
36	23 March	St Mirren	H	0–2		3,000
37	30 March	Ayr United	A	2–3	McNaughton, Robertson	8,000
38	27 April	Hibernian	A	1–2	Coats	8,000

=== League table ===
Pos	Team	Pld	W	D	L	GF	GA	GD	Pts
6	Aberdeen	38	17	10	11	68	54	+14	44
7	Motherwell	38	15	10	13	83	64	+19	40
8	Dundee	38	16	8	14	63	63	0	40
9	Kilmarnock	38	16	6	16	76	68	+8	38
10	Clyde	38	14	10	14	71	69	+2	38

Source: RSSSF

== Scottish Cup ==
Statistics provided by Dee Archive.

Match day	Date	Opponent	H/A	Score	Dundee scorer(s)	Attendance
1st round	26 January	Motherwell	A	0–1		27,000

== Player statistics ==
Statistics provided by Dee Archive

No.	Pos	Nat	Player	Total		First Division		Scottish Cup	
No.	Pos	Nat	Player	Apps	Goals	Apps	Goals	Apps	Goals
	MF	(Scotland) SCO	Willie Blyth	25	0	25	0	0	0
	FW	(Scotland) SCO	Archie Coats	39	30	38	30	1	0
	DF	(Scotland) SCO	Jock Gilmour	36	0	35	0	1	0
	FW	(Scotland) SCO	Jimmy Guthrie	37	5	36	5	1	0
	DF	(Scotland) SCO	Bill Hogg	1	0	1	0	0	0
	FW	(England) ENG	Norman Kirby	27	3	26	3	1	0
	GK	(Scotland) SCO	Albert Lamb	7	0	7	0	0	0
	FW	(Scotland) SCO	Morgan Mackay	7	3	7	3	0	0
	GK	(England) ENG	Bill Marsh	32	0	31	0	1	0
	MF	(Scotland) SCO	Tom McCarthy	11	0	11	0	0	0
	FW	(Scotland) SCO	Eddie McGoldrick	1	0	1	0	0	0
	FW	(Scotland) SCO	Gibson McNaughton	31	9	30	8	1	1
	DF	(Scotland) SCO	Lew Morgan	38	0	37	0	1	0
	FW	(Scotland) SCO	William Pollock	3	0	3	0	0	0
	FW	(Scotland) SCO	Dennis Quigley	2	0	2	0	0	0
	FW	(Scotland) SCO	Bobby Rankin	17	3	16	3	1	0
	DF	(Scotland) SCO	Bobby Rennie	3	0	3	0	0	0
	FW	(Scotland) SCO	Tommy Robertson	36	11	35	11	1	0
	MF	(Scotland) SCO	Dave Russell	0	0	0	0	0	0
	MF	(Scotland) SCO	John Russell	14	0	14	0	0	0
	MF	(Scotland) SCO	Tom Smith	23	0	22	0	1	0
	MF	(Scotland) SCO	Scot Symon	37	0	36	0	1	0
	MF	(Scotland) SCO	Tom Wemyss	2	0	2	0	0	0

== See also ==
- List of Dundee F.C. seasons
