= 1933–34 Dundee F.C. season =

Dundee
1933–34 season
- Manager: Billy McCandless
- Division One: 12th
- Scottish Cup: Second round
- Top goalscorer: League: Morgan Mackay (17); All: Morgan Mackay (17)
Home colours

The 1933–34 season was the thirty-ninth season in which Dundee competed at a Scottish national level, playing in Division One under new manager Billy McCandless, where they would finish in 12th place. Dundee would also compete in the Scottish Cup, where they were knocked out in the 2nd round by Aberdeen.

== Scottish Division One ==
Statistics provided by Dee Archive.

Match day	Date	Opponent	H/A	Score	Dundee scorer(s)	Attendance
1	12 August	St Johnstone	A	1–0	Lee	
2	19 August	Clyde	H	1–1	Lee	
3	23 August	Motherwell	A	0–1		
4	26 August	Falkirk	A	1–2	Lee	
5	2 September	Queen of the South	H	8–0	Blyth, Murdoch, Paterson, Mackay (3), Lee, Morgan	7,000
6	9 September	Aberdeen	A	3–1	Mackay (2), Lee	17,000
7	13 September	Third Lanark	H	3–0	Robertson, Lee, Mackay	
8	16 September	Queen's Park	H	1–0	Murdoch	
9	23 September	Rangers	A	0–1		12,000
10	30 September	Heart of Midlothian	H	0–1		12,000
11	7 October	Hamilton Academical	A	2–3	Murdoch, Paterson	
12	14 October	Kilmarnock	H	0–2		
13	21 October	Cowdenbeath	H	4–2	Murdoch, Lee (2), Mackay	
14	28 October	Airdrieonians	A	1–2	Mackay	
15	4 November	Motherwell	H	2–3	Robertson (2)	
16	11 November	Third Lanark	A	1–4	Morgan	
17	18 November	St Mirren	A	3–0	Lee, Kirby, Murdoch	
18	25 November	Ayr United	A	3–3	Robertson, Kirby, Blyth	
19	2 December	Partick Thistle	H	1–2	Murdoch	
20	9 December	Celtic	H	3–2	Kirby, Guthrie, Lee	12,000
21	16 December	Hibernian	A	1–2	Guthrie	7,000
22	23 December	St Johnstone	H	3–0	Mackay (3)	
23	30 December	Clyde	A	0–3		
24	1 January	Aberdeen	H	1–1	Kirby	7,000
25	2 January	Heart of Midlothian	A	1–6	Murdoch	15,732
26	6 January	Falkirk	H	1–3	Rennie	
27	13 January	Queen of the South	A	1–3	Guthrie	
28	27 January	Rangers	H	0–6		20,000
29	17 February	Queen's Park	A	4–2	Rennie (2), Rankin, Blyth	
30	24 February	Hamilton Academical	H	1–1	Rankin	
31	3 March	Kilmarnock	A	3–1	Murdoch (2), Rennie	
32	10 March	Cowdenbeath	A	1–1	Rennie	
33	17 March	Airdrieonians	H	4–0	Guthrie, Murdoch, Mackay, Kirby	
34	24 March	St Mirren	H	3–0	Rankin, Mackay (2)	
35	31 March	Ayr United	H	2–1	McCarthy, Mackay	
36	7 April	Partick Thistle	A	1–1	Rennie	
37	21 April	Celtic	A	2–3	Rankin, Mackay	1,000
38	28 April	Hibernian	H	1–0	Mackay	350

=== League table ===
Pos	Team	Pld	W	D	L	GF	GA	GD	Pts
10	Falkirk	38	16	6	16	73	68	+5	38
11	Hamilton Academical	38	15	8	15	65	79	−14	38
12	Dundee	38	15	6	17	68	64	+4	36
13	Partick Thistle	38	14	5	19	73	78	−5	33
14	Clyde	38	10	11	17	56	70	−14	31

Source: RSSSF

== Scottish Cup ==
Statistics provided by Dee Archive.

Match day	Date	Opponent	H/A	Score	Dundee scorer(s)	Attendance
1st round	20 January	King's Park	A	1–0	Rankin	
2nd round	3 February	Aberdeen	A	0–2		26,943

== Player statistics ==
Statistics provided by Dee Archive

No.	Pos	Nat	Player	Total		First Division		Scottish Cup	
No.	Pos	Nat	Player	Apps	Goals	Apps	Goals	Apps	Goals
	MF	(Scotland) SCO	Willie Blyth	33	3	31	3	2	0
	MF	(Scotland) SCO	James Brown	1	0	1	0	0	0
	DF	(Scotland) SCO	Jock Gilmour	35	0	33	0	2	0
	FW	(Scotland) SCO	Jimmy Guthrie	21	4	20	4	1	0
	FW	(England) ENG	Norman Kirby	25	5	23	5	2	0
	DF	(Scotland) SCO	Alfred Lawson	3	0	3	0	0	0
	FW	(Scotland) SCO	Pat Lee	26	10	25	10	1	0
	FW	(Scotland) SCO	Morgan Mackay	32	17	30	17	2	0
	GK	(England) ENG	Bill Marsh	39	0	37	0	2	0
	MF	(Scotland) SCO	Tom McCarthy	33	1	31	1	2	0
	FW	(Scotland) SCO	Eddie McGoldrick	3	0	3	0	0	0
	DF	(Scotland) SCO	Lew Morgan	39	2	37	2	2	0
	FW	(Scotland) SCO	Johnny Murdoch	39	10	37	10	2	0
	FW	(Scotland) SCO	Danny Paterson	11	2	11	2	0	0
	GK	(Scotland) SCO	Bob Peden	1	0	1	0	0	0
	FW	(Scotland) SCO	Bobby Rankin	13	5	11	4	2	1
	FW	(Scotland) SCO	John Rennie	8	6	8	6	0	0
	FW	(Scotland) SCO	Jimmy Robertson	20	4	20	4	0	0
	FW	(Scotland) SCO	Harry Smith	2	0	2	0	0	0
	MF	(Scotland) SCO	Tom Smith	19	0	19	0	0	0
	MF	(Scotland) SCO	Scot Symon	37	0	35	0	2	0

== See also ==
- List of Dundee F.C. seasons
