= 1929–30 Dundee F.C. season =

Dundee
1929–30 season
- Manager: Jimmy Bissett
- Division One: 14th
- Scottish Cup: Quarter-finals
- Top goalscorer: League: Andy Campbell (15); All: Andy Campbell (20)
Home colours

The 1929–30 season was the thirty-fifth season in which Dundee competed at a Scottish national level, playing in Division One, where they would finish in 14th place. Dundee would also compete in the Scottish Cup, where they would make it to the Quarter-finals before being knocked out by Heart of Midlothian in a replay.

== Scottish Division One ==
Statistics provided by Dee Archive.

Match day	Date	Opponent	H/A	Score	Dundee scorer(s)	Attendance
1	10 August	Partick Thistle	A	2–0	Townrow, O'Hare	
2	17 August	Falkirk	H	0–0		
3	24 August	Motherwell	A	0–3		
4	31 August	Dundee United	H	1–0	Townrow	17,000
5	7 September	St Mirren	A	0–3		
6	14 September	St Johnstone	H	0–1		
7	21 September	Celtic	A	1–1	Pryde	6,000
8	28 September	Kilmarnock	H	2–2	Thomson, Ferguson	
9	5 October	Queen's Park	H	1–0	Ferguson	
10	12 October	Hamilton Academical	A	0–2		
11	19 October	Hibernian	H	4–0	McNab, McCarthy, Thomson, Robertson	5,000
12	26 October	Aberdeen	A	0–1		20,000
13	2 November	Clyde	H	0–1		
14	9 November	Greenock Morton	A	1–2	O'Hare	
15	16 November	Airdrieonians	H	3–0	Campbell, O'Hare, Feeney	
16	23 November	Cowdenbeath	A	1–2	Campbell	
17	30 November	Ayr United	A	2–2	Feeney, Campbell	
18	7 December	Rangers	A	1–4	Feeney	12,000
19	14 December	Heart of Midlothian	H	3–0	McNab, Campbell, O'Hare	8,000
20	21 December	Partick Thistle	H	2–4	Campbell (2)	
21	25 December	St Johnstone	A	1–0	O'Hare	
22	28 December	Falkirk	A	2–5	Milne (2)	
23	1 January	Aberdeen	H	0–3		20,000
24	2 January	Hibernian	A	1–0	Robb (o.g.)	10,000
25	4 January	Motherwell	H	0–3		
26	11 January	Dundee United	A	1–0	Campbell	16,000
27	25 January	St Mirren	H	1–3	Nelson	
28	8 February	Celtic	H	2–2	Campbell, Milne	10,000
29	22 February	Queen's Park	A	1–2	Campbell	
30	8 March	Clyde	A	1–1	Campbell	
31	12 March	Hamilton Academical	H	3–2	O'Hare, Campbell, Troup	
32	15 March	Greenock Morton	H	3–2	Troup (2), Ritchie	
33	22 March	Airdrieonians	A	2–3	Robertson, Campbell	
34	29 March	Cowdenbeath	H	3–0	Ritchie, Troup, O'Hare	
35	5 April	Ayr United	H	3–0	Campbell (3)	
36	19 April	Heart of Midlothian	A	0–1		5,500
37	21 April	Kilmarnock	A	2–0	O'Hare, McNab	
38	23 April	Rangers	H	1–3	Troup	5,000

=== League table ===
Pos	Team	Pld	W	D	L	GF	GA	GD	Pts
12	Airdrieonians	38	16	4	18	60	66	−6	36
13	Hamilton Academical	38	14	7	17	76	81	−5	35
14	Dundee	38	14	6	18	51	58	−7	34
15	Queen's Park	38	15	4	19	67	80	−13	34
16	Cowdenbeath	38	13	7	18	64	74	−10	33

Source: "1929-1930 Division 1 - SPFL Archive". SPFL.

== Scottish Cup ==
Statistics provided by Dee Archive.

Match day	Date	Opponent	H/A	Score	Dundee scorer(s)	Attendance
1st round	18 January	Greenock Morton	H	2–0	Campbell (2)	
2nd round	1 February	St Johnstone	H	4–1	Campbell (2), Milne, O'Hare	
3rd round	15 February	Airdrieonians	H	0–0		
3R replay	19 February	Airdrieonians	A	0–0		
3R 2nd replay	24 February	Airdrieonians	N	2–1	Robertson, O'Hare	
Quarter-finals	1 March	Heart of Midlothian	H	2–2	Campbell, Robertson	31,000
QF replay	5 March	Heart of Midlothian	A	0–2		32,000

== Player statistics ==
Statistics provided by Dee Archive

No.	Pos	Nat	Player	Total		First Division		Scottish Cup	
No.	Pos	Nat	Player	Apps	Goals	Apps	Goals	Apps	Goals
	MF	(Scotland) SCO	Willie Blyth	13	0	13	0	0	0
	DF	(Scotland) SCO	Finlay Brown	43	0	36	0	7	0
	FW	(Scotland) SCO	Andy Campbell	39	20	32	15	7	5
	FW	(Scotland) SCO	George Dempster	1	0	1	0	0	0
	FW	(Scotland) SCO	Owen Feeney	5	3	5	3	0	0
	FW	(Scotland) SCO	Hughie Ferguson	17	2	17	2	0	0
	DF	(Scotland) SCO	Jock Gilmour	43	0	36	0	7	0
	DF	(Scotland) SCO	Davie Hopewell	1	0	1	0	0	0
	MF	(Scotland) SCO	Tom Lynch	15	0	15	0	0	0
	GK	(England) ENG	Bill Marsh	37	0	33	0	4	0
	MF	(Scotland) SCO	Tom McCarthy	45	1	38	1	7	0
	MF	(Scotland) SCO	Colin McNab	44	3	37	3	7	0
	FW	(Scotland) SCO	Willie Milne	16	4	11	3	5	1
	GK	(Scotland) SCO	Tom Murray	8	0	5	0	3	0
	MF	(Scotland) SCO	John Nelson	11	1	9	1	2	0
	FW	(Scotland) SCO	Willie O'Hare	41	10	34	8	7	2
	DF	(Scotland) SCO	Bill Proctor	2	0	2	0	0	0
	FW	(Scotland) SCO	Jim Pryde	4	1	4	1	0	0
	FW	(Scotland) SCO	Harry Ritchie	15	2	10	2	5	0
	FW	(Scotland) SCO	Jimmy Robertson	41	4	34	2	7	2
	MF	(Scotland) SCO	Jock Thomson	33	2	26	2	7	0
	FW	(Scotland) SCO	Frank Townrow	10	2	10	2	0	0
	FW	(Scotland) SCO	Alec Troup	11	5	9	5	2	0

== See also ==
- List of Dundee F.C. seasons
