= 1937–38 Dundee F.C. season =

Dundee
1937–38 season
- Manager: Andy Cunningham
- Division One: 19th (relegated)
- Scottish Cup: First round
- Top goalscorer: League: Arthur Baxter (23); All: Arthur Baxter (24)
Home colours

The 1937–38 season was the forty-third season in which Dundee competed at a Scottish national level, playing in Division One under new manager Andy Cunningham. Despite a very strong start to the season and a record 6–1 win over Rangers, Dundee would finish in 19th place after a draw against relegation rivals Ayr United and Queen of the South defeating Rangers on the final day, and would be relegated by a single point from the Scottish Division One for the first time in their history despite having "the richest directorate in Scotland at the time." Dundee would also compete in the Scottish Cup, where they were knocked out in the 1st round by Albion Rovers.

== Scottish Division One ==
Statistics provided by Dee Archive.

Match day	Date	Opponent	H/A	Score	Dundee scorer(s)	Attendance
1	14 August	Arbroath	A	3–0	Baxter (2), Regan	9,500
2	21 August	Clyde	H	4–1	Kirby, Baxter (2), Regan	15,000
3	25 August	Arbroath	H	1–0	Kirby	11,000
4	28 August	Greenock Morton	A	2–0	Regan, Baxter	8,000
5	4 September	Queen of the South	H	4–1	Kirby, Baxter (2), Coats	15,000
6	11 September	Aberdeen	A	3–2	Coats, Baxter (2)	26,000
7	14 September	Clyde	H	2–3	Coats, McMenemy	9,000
8	18 September	Queen's Park	H	2–0	McMenemy, Cross (o.g.)	6,000
9	25 September	Hamilton Academical	H	0–4		14,000
10	30 September	Queen of the South	A	2–2	Regan, Baxter	6,000
11	2 October	Kilmarnock	H	1–2	Baxter	8,000
12	4 October	Third Lanark	H	2–1	Regan, Coats	15,000
13	9 October	Rangers	A	0–6		30,000
14	16 October	Heart of Midlothian	H	0–2		20,000
15	23 October	Partick Thistle	H	5–3	Baxter (2), Smith, McMenemy, Laurie	11,000
16	30 October	St Johnstone	A	2–4	Baxter (2)	7,000
17	6 November	Motherwell	H	2–2	Coats, Smith	16,000
18	13 November	Falkirk	H	1–4	Boyd	10,000
19	20 November	Third Lanark	A	3–4	Boyd, Cowie, Holland	6,000
20	27 November	Hibernian	H	1–2	McMenemy	8,000
21	25 December	Greenock Morton	H	2–2	Coats	4,500
22	1 January	Aberdeen	H	0–1		22,000
23	3 January	Heart of Midlothian	A	1–2	McMenemy	24,901
24	8 January	Queen's Park	A	1–3	Kirby	6,000
25	15 January	Hamilton Academical	H	3–0	Coats, Kirby, McMenemy	6,500
26	29 January	Kilmarnock	A	1–3	Boyd	
27	5 February	Rangers	H	6–1	Baxter (3), Coats (2), Boyd	15,000
28	19 February	Partick Thistle	A	0–1		10,000
29	26 February	St Johnstone	H	6–1	Coats, McMenemy (2), Baxter (2), Laurie	11,000
30	5 March	St Mirren	H	0–0		8,000
31	12 March	Motherwell	A	1–1	Baxter	
32	19 March	St Mirren	A	1–2	McMenemy	4,000
33	2 April	Hibernian	H	1–2	Laurie	5,000
34	11 April	Ayr United	H	5–1	Coats (2), Roberts, Baxter (2)	8,000
35	16 April	Celtic	H	2–3	Roberts, Cowie	21,000
36	18 April	Celtic	A	0–3		7,000
37	23 April	Falkirk	A	0–5		4,000
38	30 April	Ayr United	A	0–0		9,000

=== League table ===
Pos	Team	Pld	W	D	L	GF	GA	GD	Pts
16	Queen of the South	38	11	11	16	58	71	−13	33
17	Ayr United	38	9	15	14	66	85	−19	33
18	Kilmarnock	38	12	9	17	65	91	−26	33
19	Dundee	38	13	6	19	70	74	−4	32
20	Morton	38	6	3	29	64	127	−63	15

Source: RSSSF

== Scottish Cup ==
Statistics provided by Dee Archive.

Match day	Date	Opponent	H/A	Score	Dundee scorer(s)	Attendance
1st round	22 January	Albion Rovers	A	2–4	Coats, Baxter	

== Player statistics ==
Statistics provided by Dee Archive

No.	Pos	Nat	Player	Total		First Division		Scottish Cup	
No.	Pos	Nat	Player	Apps	Goals	Apps	Goals	Apps	Goals
	MF	(Scotland) SCO	Bert Adamson	3	0	3	0	0	0
	FW	(Scotland) SCO	Arthur Baxter	37	24	36	23	1	1
	FW	(Scotland) SCO	Jimmy Boyd	37	4	36	4	1	0
	FW	(Scotland) SCO	Archie Coats	39	14	38	13	1	1
	MF	(Scotland) SCO	Andy Cowie	38	2	37	2	1	0
	DF	(Scotland) SCO	Johnny Evans	20	0	20	0	0	0
	FW	(Scotland) SCO	Gilbert Holland	3	1	3	1	0	0
	FW	(England) ENG	Norman Kirby	24	5	23	5	1	0
	MF	(Scotland) SCO	John Laurie	33	3	33	3	0	0
	GK	(Scotland) SCO	Johnny Lynch	23	0	22	0	1	0
	GK	(England) ENG	Bill Marsh	16	0	16	0	0	0
	FW	(Scotland) SCO	Harry McMenemy	37	9	36	9	1	0
	MF	(Scotland) SCO	Bill Morgan	19	0	18	0	1	0
	FW	(Scotland) SCO	Bobby Regan	16	5	16	5	0	0
	DF	(Scotland) SCO	Bobby Rennie	19	0	18	0	1	0
	DF	(Wales) WAL	Len Richards	24	0	23	0	1	0
	FW	(Scotland) SCO	Sam Roberts	12	2	12	2	0	0
	MF	(Scotland) SCO	Tom Smith	27	2	27	2	0	0
	MF	(Scotland) SCO	Harry Sneddon	12	0	11	0	1	0

== See also ==
- List of Dundee F.C. seasons
