= Peden =

Peden may refer to:

== People ==
=== First name ===
- Peden McLeod (1940–2021), American lawyer and politician

=== Middle name ===
- Pearl Peden Oldfield (1876–1962), American politician

=== Surname ===
- Alexander Peden (1626–1686), Scottish religious figure
- Bill Peden (born 1970), Australian rugby league footballer
- Bob Peden (1906–1985), Scottish footballer
- Chris Peden, American politician
- Don Peden (1898–1970), American football and baseball player and coach
- Doug Peden (1916–2005), Canadian basketball player
- Forrest E. Peden (1913–1945), American soldier and Medal of Honor recipient
- G. C. Peden (born 1943), British historian
- George Peden (footballer) (born 1943), Scottish footballer
- Irene C. Peden (1925–2025), American engineer
- Jack Peden (1863–1944), Irish footballer
- John Peden (American football), American football coach
- Les Peden (1923–2002), American baseball player and manager
- Margaret Peden (1905–1981), Australian cricketer
- Margaret Sayers Peden (1927–2020), American translator and professor
- Mike Peden, British producer, remixer, and composer
- Murray Peden, (1923–2022), Canadian Air Force pilot, lawyer and author
- Murray Peden, (1946–1978), Scottish cricketer
- Preston E. Peden (1914–1985), American politician
- Robbie Peden (born 1973), Australian boxer

== Places ==
- Peden Cliffs, a line of cliffs in Antarctica
- Peden Stadium, a football stadium on the campus of Ohio University
- Peden's Stone, a monument in Harthill, Scotland named for Alexander Peden
