= 1938–39 Dundee F.C. season =

Dundee
1938–39 season
- Manager: Andy Cunningham
- Division Two: 6th
- Scottish Cup: Second round
- Top goalscorer: League: Charlie McGillivray (29); All: Charles McGillivray (29)
Home colours

The 1938–39 season was the forty-fourth season in which Dundee competed at a Scottish national level, and the first season playing in the second tier, having been relegated from the Scottish Division One the previous season. In their first season in Division Two, Dundee would finish in 6th place. Dundee would also compete in the Scottish Cup, where they were knocked out in the 2nd round by Clyde in a replay.

== Scottish Division Two ==
Statistics provided by Dee Archive.

Match day	Date	Opponent	H/A	Score	Dundee scorer(s)	Attendance
1	13 August	Brechin City	H	5–0	Coats (2), Melville, Cowie, Brown (o.g.)	7,000
2	20 August	Greenock Morton	A	1–2	Miller	6,500
3	27 August	Stenhousemuir	H	3–1	Baxter (2), Coats	6,000
4	3 September	Dunfermline Athletic	A	1–4	Smith	3,000
5	10 September	Edinburgh City	H	2–2	Coats, Sneddon	3,000
6	17 September	Dundee United	A	0–3		10,523
7	24 September	Forfar Athletic	H	10–2	Sneddon, Coats (3), Stewart (3), Baxter (2), Gray	3,500
8	1 October	Leith Athletic	A	1–3	McGillivray	2,000
9	8 October	East Stirlingshire	H	5–6	Stewart, McGillivray (3), Roberts	4,000
10	15 October	East Fife	H	1–1	McGillivray	10,000
11	22 October	Cowdenbeath	A	1–3	Coats	5,000
12	29 October	Dumbarton	A	4–4	McGillivray, Stewart, McAllister (o.g.), Laurie	4,500
13	5 November	Airdrieonians	A	1–2	Stewart	6,000
14	12 November	King's Park	A	1–3	McGillivray	3,000
15	19 November	Alloa Athletic	A	1–2	Bulloch (o.g.)	2,500
16	26 November	Montrose	H	5–0	McGillivray (3), Cook, Coats	3,000
17	3 December	St Bernard's	H	3–0	Kirby, McGillivray, Roberts	4,000
18	10 December	Forfar Athletic	A	1–2	Coats	11,000
19	17 December	Alloa Athletic	H	1–4	McGillivray	1,000
20	24 December	Stenhousemuir	A	1–1	McGillivray	1,500
21	31 December	Greenock Morton	H	2–1	Coats (2)	4,000
22	3 January	Edinburgh City	A	4–1	Laurie (3), McGillivray	
23	14 January	Airdrieonians	A	6–3	Coats (2), McGillivray (4)	4,000
24	28 January	Cowdenbeath	H	5–0	McGillivray (3), Wilson, Coats	15,826
25	11 February	Brechin City	A	1–2	McGillivray	1,500
26	18 February	King's Park	H	3–0	Coats, Melville, Wilson	2,000
27	25 February	Leith Athletic	H	7–0	Ramsay (2), McGillivray, Coats (2), Wilson, Sneddon	2,500
28	4 March	East Stirlingshire	A	5–3	Coats (3), McGillivray (2)	1,000
29	11 March	East Fife	A	2–0	Sneddon, Coats	2,500
30	18 March	Dundee United	H	2–0	McGillivray, Wilson	12,500
31	1 April	Dunfermline Athletic	H	7–1	Melville, Coats (3), Stewart, McGillivray (2)	3,800
32	8 April	St Bernard's	A	1–1	Stewart	2,000
33	15 April	Dumbarton	H	1–1	Laurie	1,700
34	29 April	Montrose	A	5–5	Stewart, Melville (2), Coats, McGillivray	1,500

=== League table ===
Pos	Team	Pld	W	D	L	GF	GA	GD	Pts	Qualification
4	Airdrieonians	34	21	5	8	85	57	+28	47	
5	Dunfermline Athletic	34	18	5	11	99	78	+21	41	
6	Dundee	34	15	7	12	99	63	+36	37	
7	St Bernard's (Note: Team did not return to the league when official competitions resumed in 1946–47.)	34	15	6	13	39	39	0	36	Left the League
8	Stenhousemuir	34	15	5	14	74	69	+5	35	

Source: "1938-1939 Division 2 - SPFL Archive". SPFL.

== Scottish Cup ==
Statistics provided by Dee Archive.

Match day	Date	Opponent	H/A	Score	Dundee scorer(s)	Attendance
2nd round	4 February	Clyde	H	0–0		15,000
2R replay	8 February	Clyde	A	0–1		15,000

== Player statistics ==
Statistics provided by Dee Archive

No.	Pos	Nat	Player	Total		Division Two		Scottish Cup	
No.	Pos	Nat	Player	Apps	Goals	Apps	Goals	Apps	Goals
	FW	(Scotland) SCO	Arthur Baxter	14	4	14	4	0	0
	DF	(Scotland) SCO	John Brothwick	6	0	6	0	0	0
	DF	(Scotland) SCO	Micky Clark	1	0	1	0	0	0
	FW	(Scotland) SCO	Archie Coats	36	26	34	26	2	0
	FW	(Scotland) SCO	Willie Cook	20	1	18	1	2	0
	MF	(Scotland) SCO	Andy Cowie	17	1	17	1	0	0
	MF	(Scotland) SCO	Jim Dougal	1	0	1	0	0	0
	GK	(Scotland) SCO	Frank Galloway	1	0	1	0	0	0
	FW	(Scotland) SCO	Charlie Gray	1	1	1	1	0	0
	FW	(England) ENG	Norman Kirby	21	1	19	1	2	0
	MF	(Scotland) SCO	John Laurie	20	4	18	4	2	0
	GK	(Scotland) SCO	Johnny Lynch	35	0	33	0	2	0
	MF	(Scotland) SCO	Bill Masson	15	0	13	0	2	0
	FW	(Scotland) SCO	Charlie McGillivray	28	29	26	29	2	0
	DF	(Scotland) SCO	Ronnie McWalter	1	0	1	0	0	0
	FW	(Scotland) SCO	Johnston Melville	17	5	17	5	0	0
	FW	(Scotland) SCO	Norman Miller	4	1	4	1	0	0
	MF	(Scotland) SCO	Bill Morgan	8	0	8	0	0	0
	MF	(Scotland) SCO	Jimmy Morgan	1	0	1	0	0	0
	FW	(Scotland) SCO	Bob Ramsay	2	2	2	2	0	0
	DF	(Scotland) SCO	Bobby Rennie	33	0	31	0	2	0
	FW	(Scotland) SCO	Sam Roberts	22	2	21	2	1	0
	MF	(Scotland) SCO	Tom Smith	17	1	17	1	0	0
	MF	(Scotland) SCO	Harry Sneddon	31	4	29	4	2	0
	FW	(Scotland) SCO	George Stewart	30	9	28	9	2	0
	MF	(Scotland) SCO	Frank Sweeney	2	0	2	0	0	0
	FW	(Scotland) SCO	Bobby Wilson	12	5	11	5	1	0

== See also ==
- List of Dundee F.C. seasons
