= John Reddish (disambiguation) =

John Reddish may refer to:

- John Reddish (footballer, born 1879) (1879-1935), English footballer, see List of Bury F.C. players (1–24 appearances)
- John Reddish (soldier) (1902-1971), Australian soldier
- John Reddish (1904-1989), English footballer and Cricketer, also known as Jack Reddish
