= 1934–35 Heart of Midlothian F.C. season =

Heart of Midlothian
1934–35 season
- Manager: Willie McCartney
- Stadium: Tynecastle Park
- Scottish First Division: 3rd
- Scottish Cup: Semi-final

During the 1934–35 season Hearts competed in the Scottish First Division, the Scottish Cup and the East of Scotland Shield.

== Fixtures ==
=== Friendlies ===
15 August 1934 Testimonial	Hearts	5–1	Austria Vienna	Tynecastle Park

16 August 1934 Friendly	Berwick Rangers	1–3	Hearts	Tynecastle Park

17 September 1934 Benefit	Huddersfield Town	2–2	Hearts	Boothferry Park

24 September 1934 Testimonial	Hearts	3–0	Huddersfield Town	Tynecastle Park

5 December 1934 Benefit	East Craigie	4–8	Hearts	Stamford Bridge

24 April 1935 Benefit	Bradford Park Avenue	3–1	Hearts	Lonsdale Park

26 April 1935 Friendly	East of Scotland XI	0–4	Hearts	Victoria Park

=== Wilson Cup ===
30 April 1935 Final	Hearts	4–0	Hibernian	Tynecastle Park

=== East of Scotland Shield ===
29 August 1934 SF	Hearts	5–1	St Bernard's	Tynecastle Park
				Attendance: 4,000

23 April 1935 Final	Hibernian	2–4	Hearts	Easter Road
				Attendance: 4,000

=== Stirling Charity Cup ===
4 May 1935 Stirling Charity Cup Final	King's Park	2–3	Hearts	Forthbank Park
				Attendance: 900

=== Rosebery Charity Cup ===
8 May 1935 SF	Hearts	5–2	Hamilton Academical	Tynecastle Park

15 May 1935 Final	Hearts	2–1	Leith Athletic	Tynecastle Park
				Attendance: 5,000

=== Scottish Cup ===
26 January 1935 Scottish Cup R1	Hearts	7–0	Solway Star	Tynecastle Park
				Attendance: 5,811

9 February 1935 Scottish Cup R2	Hearts	2–0	Kilmarnock	Tynecastle Park
				Attendance: 36,863

23 February 1935 Scottish Cup R3	Hearts	2–2	Dundee United	Tynecastle Park
				Attendance: 29,682

27 February 1935 Scottish Cup R3 Replay	Dundee United	2–4	Hearts	Tannadice Park
				Attendance: 22,266

9 March 1935 Scottish Cup R4	Airdrieonians	2–3	Hearts	Broomfield Park
				Attendance: 24,000

30 March 1935 Scottish Cup SF	Rangers	1–1	Hearts	Hampden Park
				Attendance: 102,661

10 April 1935 Scottish Cup SF Replay	Rangers	2–0	Hearts	Hampden Park
				Attendance: 90,428

=== Scottish First Division ===
11 August 1934 Scottish First Division	Falkirk	0–2	Hearts	Brockville Park
				Attendance: 10,000

18 August 1934 Scottish First Division	Hearts	0–0	Celtic	Tynecastle Park
				Attendance: 39,370

22 August 1934 Scottish First Division	Rangers	2–1	Hearts	Ibrox Park
				Attendance: 30,000

25 August 1934 Scottish First Division	Dunfermline Athletic	1–2	Hearts	East End Park
				Attendance: 10,000

1 September 1934 Scottish First Division	Hearts	1–1	Dundee	Tynecastle Park
				Attendance: 21,250

8 September 1934 Scottish First Division	Hibernian	1–0	Hearts	Tynecastle Park
				Attendance: 24,038

12 September 1934 Scottish First Division	Hearts	4–0	Albion Rovers	Tynecastle Park
				Attendance: 9,870

15 September 1934 Scottish First Division	Hearts	1–0	Airdrieonians	Tynecastle Park
				Attendance: 14,271

22 September 1934 Scottish First Division	Partick Thistle	1–3	Hearts	Firhill Park
				Attendance: 10,000

29 September 1934 Scottish First Division	Hearts	5–0	Ayr United	Tynecastle Park
				Attendance: 13,935

6 October 1934 Scottish First Division	St Mirren	2–4	Hearts	St Mirren Park, Love Street
				Attendance: 5,000

13 October 1934 Scottish First Division	Hearts	2–1	Motherwell	Tynecastle Park
				Attendance: 32,887

24 October 1934 Scottish First Division	Hearts	2–1	Hamilton Academical	Tynecastle Park
				Attendance: 19,153

27 October 1934 Scottish First Division	Queen's Park	3–3	Hearts	Hampden Park
				Attendance: 12,022

3 November 1934 Scottish First Division	Queen of the South	1–3	Hearts	Palmerston Park
				Attendance: 7,000

10 November 1934 Scottish First Division	Clyde	0–1	Hearts	Shawfield Stadium
				Attendance: 8,000

17 November 1934 Scottish First Division	Hearts	2–2	Kilmarnock	Tynecastle Park
				Attendance: 19,132

24 November 1934 Scottish First Division	Aberdeen	1–0	Hearts	Pittodrie Park
				Attendance: 16,000

1 December 1934 Scottish First Division	Hearts	2–2	St Johnstone	Tynecastle Park
				Attendance: 22,673

8 December 1934 Scottish First Division	Hearts	4–1	Rangers	Tynecastle Park
				Attendance: 36,345

15 December 1934 Scottish First Division	Albion Rovers	2–2	Hearts	Cliftonhill
				Attendance: 10,000

22 December 1934 Scottish First Division	Hearts	4–1	Falkirk	Tynecastle Park
				Attendance: 13,951

29 December 1934 Scottish First Division	Celtic	4–2	Hearts	Celtic Park
				Attendance: 30,000

1 January 1935 Scottish First Division	Hearts	5–2	Hibernian	Tynecastle Park
				Attendance: 28,743

2 January 1935 Scottish First Division	Dundee	1–5	Hearts	Dens Park
				Attendance: 23,500

5 January 1935 Scottish First Division	Hearts	0–1	Dunfermline Athletic	Tynecastle Park
				Attendance: 18,108

12 January 1935 Scottish First Division	Airdrieonians	4–7	Hearts	Broomfield Park
				Attendance: 4,000

19 January 1935 Scottish First Division	Hearts	1–2	Partick Thistle	Tynecastle Park
				Attendance: 19,282

2 February 1935 Scottish First Division	Ayr United	0–3	Hearts	Somerset Park
				Attendance: 7,000

16 February 1935 Scottish First Division	Hearts	0–1	St Mirren	Tynecastle Park
				Attendance: 6,960

2 March 1935 Scottish First Division	Motherwell	2–2	Hearts	Fir Park
				Attendance: 6,000

16 March 1935 Scottish First Division	Hearts	2–1	Queen's Park	Tynecastle Park
				Attendance: 11,366

23 March 1935 Scottish First Division	Hearts	4–2	Queen of the South	Tynecastle Park
				Attendance: 10,833

5 April 1935 Scottish First Division	Hamilton Academical	2–0	Hearts	Douglas Park
				Attendance: 2,000

13 April 1935 Scottish First Division	Kilmarnock	3–3	Hearts	Rugby Park
				Attendance: 4,000

15 April 1935 Scottish First Division	Hearts	2–0	Clyde	Tynecastle Park
				Attendance: 5,645

20 April 1935 Scottish First Division	Hearts	1–1	Aberdeen	Tynecastle Park
				Attendance: 10,668

27 April 1935 Scottish First Division	St Johnstone	2–2	Hearts	Muirton Park
				Attendance: 4,000

== See also ==
- List of Heart of Midlothian F.C. seasons
