= Arthur Baxter =

Arthur Baxter may refer to:

- Arthur Baxter (cricketer) (1910–1986), Scottish cricketer
- Arthur Baxter (footballer) (1911–1944), Scottish professional footballer
- Arthur Beverley Baxter (1891–1964), Canadian-born UK journalist and politician
