= 1936–37 Heart of Midlothian F.C. season =

Heart of Midlothian
1936–37 season
- Manager: David Pratt
- Stadium: Tynecastle Park
- Scottish First Division: 5th
- Scottish Cup: Round 3

During the 1936–37 season Hearts competed in the Scottish First Division, the Scottish Cup and the East of Scotland Shield.

== Fixtures ==
=== Friendlies ===
11 August 1936 Friendly	Leith Athletic	1–1	Hearts	Old Meadowbank
	Goal

23 September 1936 Benefit	Hearts	1–1	Chelsea	Tynecastle Park
	Goal

5 October 1936 Friendly	Raith Rovers	1–5	Hearts	Stark's Park
	Goal

18 November 1936 Testimonial	Hearts	4–4	Grajanski Zagreb	Tynecastle Park
	Goal

27 April 1937 Friendly	East of Scotland XI	1–3	Hearts	Raid Stane Park
	Goal

=== Wilson Cup ===
12 August 1936 Final	Hearts	3–2	Hibernian	Tynecastle Park
	Goal

=== East of Scotland Shield ===
2 September 1936 Semi-Final	Hearts	3–0	Leith Athletic	Tynecastle Park
				Attendance: 2,000

14 April 1937 Final	Hearts	6–2	Hibernian	Tynecastle Park
				Attendance: 7,431

=== Rosebery Charity Cup ===
1 May 1937 Semi-Final	Hearts	6–2	St Bernard's	Tynecastle Park
	Goal

15 May 1937 Final	Hearts	2–0	Hibernian	Tynecastle Park
	Goal

=== Stirling Charity Cup ===
7 May 1937 Final	King's Park	1–5	Hearts	Forthbank Park

=== Scottish Cup ===
30 January 1937 Scottish Cup R1	Hearts	3–1	St Bernard's	Tynecastle Park
				Attendance: 13,120

13 February 1937 Scottish Cup R2	Hearts	15–0	King's Park	Tynecastle Park
				Attendance: 16,647

3 March 1937 Scottish Cup R3	Hamilton Academical	2–1	Hearts	Douglas Park
				Attendance: 28,690

=== Scottish First Division ===
8 August 1936 Scottish First Division	Dunfermline Athletic	2–5	Hearts	East End Park
				Attendance: 12,000

15 August 1936 Scottish First Division	Hearts	3–4	Motherwell	Tynecastle Park
				Attendance: 32,759

19 August 1936 Scottish First Division	Hearts	3–2	Dunfermline Athletic	Tynecastle Park
				Attendance: 15,591

22 August 1936 Scottish First Division	Arbroath	0–3	Hearts	Gayfield Park
				Attendance: 5,000

29 August 1936 Scottish First Division	Hearts	2–1	St Mirren	Tynecastle Park
				Attendance: 19,945

5 September 1936 Scottish First Division	Third Lanark	3–0	Hearts	Cathkin Park
				Attendance: 15,000

9 September 1936 Scottish First Division	Motherwell	1–3	Hearts	Fir Park
				Attendance: 6,000

12 September 1936 Scottish First Division	Hearts	3–1	Falkirk	Tynecastle Park
				Attendance: 15,698

19 September 1936 Scottish First Division	Hibernian	3–3	Hearts	Easter Road
				Attendance: 27,741

26 September 1936 Scottish First Division	Hearts	0–1	Celtic	Tynecastle Park
				Attendance: 42,223

3 October 1936 Scottish First Division	Partick Thistle	2–2	Hearts	Firhill Park
				Attendance: 8,000

10 October 1936 Scottish First Division	Hearts	4–0	Dundee	Tynecastle Park
				Attendance: 20,040

17 October 1936 Scottish First Division	St Johnstone	3–0	Hearts	Tynecastle Park
				Attendance: 4,5000

24 October 1936 Scottish First Division	Hearts	5–0	Kilmarnock	Tynecastle Park
				Attendance: 8,495

7 November 1937 Scottish First Division	Hearts	6–0	Hamilton Academical	Tynecastle Park
				Attendance: 15,293

14 November 1936 Scottish First Division	Hearts	2–0	Aberdeen	Tynecastle Park
				Attendance: 32,668

21 November 1936 Scottish First Division	Queen's Park	0–2	Hearts	Hampden Park
				Attendance: 12,441

28 November 1936 Scottish First Division	Queen of the South	0–4	Hearts	Palmerston Park
				Attendance: 8,000

5 December 1936 Scottish First Division	Hearts	5–2	Rangers	Tynecastle Park
				Attendance: 40,211

12 December 1936 Scottish First Division	Albion Rovers	1–3	Hearts	Cliftonhill
				Attendance: 10,000

19 December 1936 Scottish First Division	Hearts	4–1	Arbroath	Tynecastle Park
				Attendance: 15,019

26 December 1936 Scottish First Division	St Mirren	2–2	Hearts	St Mirren Park, Love Street
				Attendance: 12,000

1 January 1937 Scottish First Division	Hearts	3–2	Hibernian	Tynecastle Park
				Attendance: 38,908

2 January 1937 Scottish First Division	Dundee	1–0	Hearts	Dens Park
				Attendance: 22,000

4 January 1937 Scottish First Division	Rangers	0–1	Hearts	Ibrox Park
				Attendance: 31,000

9 January 1937 Scottish First Division	Hearts	5–2	Third Lanark	Tynecastle Park
				Attendance: 20,376

16 January 1937 Scottish First Division	Falkirk	3–0	Hearts	Brockville Park
				Attendance: 16,000

23 January 1937 Scottish First Division	Hearts	5–1	Partick Thistle	Tynecastle Park
				Attendance: 17,595

6 February 1937 Scottish First Division	Celtic	3–2	Hearts	Celtic Park
				Attendance: 36,000

20 February 1937 Scottish First Division	Hearts	3–1	St Johnstone	Tynecastle Park
				Attendance: 19,420

6 March 1937 Scottish First Division	Kilmarnock	3–0	Hearts	Rugby Park
				Attendance: 8,000

20 March 1937 Scottish First Division	Hamilton Academical	5–1	Hearts	Douglas Park
				Attendance: 6,000

23 March 1937 Scottish First Division	Clyde	2–1	Hearts	Shawfield Stadium
				Attendance: 7,000

27 March 1937 Scottish First Division	Aberdeen	4–0	Hearts	Pittodrie Park
				Attendance: 16,000

3 April 1937 Scottish First Division	Hearts	3–1	Queen's Park	Tynecastle Park
				Attendance: 4,230

10 April 1937 Scottish First Division	Hearts	4–2	Queen of the South	Tynecastle Park
				Attendance: 10,731

19 April 1937 Scottish First Division	Hearts	2–1	Clyde	Tynecastle Park
				Attendance: 5,002

24 April 1937 Scottish First Division	Hearts	5–0	Albion Rovers	Tynecastle Park
				Attendance: 7,454

== See also ==
- List of Heart of Midlothian F.C. seasons
