= 1936–37 Celtic F.C. season =

Celtic
1936–37 season
- Manager: Willie Maley
- Stadium: Celtic Park
- Scottish First Division: 3rd
- Scottish Cup: Winners

The 1936–37 Scottish football season was Celtic's 49th season of competitive football, in which they competed in the Scottish First Division and the Scottish Cup.

Despite an unbeaten spell of 15 league matches from 9 September to 15 December, Celtic could not keep up with the good form of both Rangers and Aberdeen, who ended champions and runners-up, respectively. Willie Maley's team ended third in the league table, nine points behind their Govan neighbours and two behind Aberdeen.

In the Scottish Cup, the team had better fortune as they were crowned champions despite having to play away in all rounds: in the 1st round, they drew away 1-1 to Stenhousemuir and progressed after winning the replay 2-0 at Celtic Park. In the 2nd round, they won 2-5 at Albion Rovers. In the 3rd round, 0-3 away at East Fife, and in the 4th round they were finally drawn home, but drew 4-4 with Motherwell and had to replay at Fir Park, where they won 1-2. The semi-final was played at Ibrox Park and Celtic beat Clyde 2-0. In the final they met Aberdeen at Hampden Park in front of a European record domestic crowd of 147,365 and won 2-1 with goals by Johnny Crum and Willie Buchan.

This was Celtic's 15th Scottish Cup and their 33rd major domestic honour.

Celtic also took part in various local or regional tournaments such as the Glasgow Cup and the Glasgow Charity Cup, the latter of which they won beating Queen's Park 4-3 at Hampden, in front of a crowd of 21,000.

== Competitions ==
=== Scottish First Division ===
==== League table ====
Pos	Team	Pld	W	D	L	GF	GA	GD	Pts
1	Rangers	38	26	9	3	88	32	+56	61
2	Aberdeen	38	23	8	7	89	44	+45	54
3	Celtic	38	22	8	8	89	58	+31	52
4	Motherwell	38	22	7	9	96	54	+42	51
5	Heart of Midlothian	38	24	3	11	99	60	+39	51

Source: RSSSF

==== Matches ====
8 August 1936 Division A	Celtic	3–2	St Johnstone	Glasgow
				Stadium: Celtic Park; Attendance: 25,000

15 August 1936 Division A	Clyde	1–1	Celtic	Glasgow
				Stadium: Shawfield Stadium; Attendance: 22,000

19 August 1936 Division A	St Johnstone	2–1	Celtic	Perth
				Stadium: Muirton Park; Attendance: 9,000

22 August 1936 Division A	Celtic	5–0	Queen of the South	Glasgow
				Stadium: Celtic Park; Attendance: 20,000

28 August 1937 Division A	Albion Rovers	1–3	Celtic	Coatbridge
				Stadium: Cliftonhill; Attendance: 16,000

5 September 1936 Division A	Celtic	2–4	Kilmarnock	Glasgow
				Stadium: Celtic Park; Attendance: 8,000

9 September 1936 Division A	Celtic	3–1	Clyde	Glasgow
				Stadium: Celtic Park; Attendance: 8,000

12 September 1936 Division A	Hamilton Academical	1–2	Celtic	Hamilton
				Stadium: Douglas Park; Attendance: 12,000

19 September 1936 Division A	Celtic	1–1	Rangers	Glasgow
				Stadium: Celtic Park; Attendance: 60,000

26 September 1936 Division A	Hearts	0–1	Celtic	Edinburgh
				Stadium: Tynecastle Park; Attendance: 42,223

3 October 1936 Division A	Celtic	3–2	Aberdeen	Glasgow
				Stadium: Celtic Park; Attendance: 46,000

10 October 1936 Division A	Queen's Park	0–2	Celtic	Glasgow
				Stadium: Hampden Park; Attendance: 17,051

17 October 1936 Division A	Dundee	0–0	Celtic	Dundee
				Stadium: Dens Park; Attendance: 24,000

24 October 1936 Division A	Celtic	5–1	Hibernian	Glasgow
				Stadium: Celtic Park; Attendance: 20,000

31 October 1936 Division A	Arbroath	2–3	Celtic	Arbroath
				Stadium: Gayfield Park; Attendance: 8,000

7 November 1936 Division A	Celtic	3–0	St Mirren	Glasgow
				Stadium: Celtic Park; Attendance: 5,000

14 November 1936 Division A	Partick Thistle	1–1	Celtic	Glasgow
				Stadium: Firhill Park; Attendance: 15,000

21 November 1936 Division A	Celtic	6–3	Third Lanark	Glasgow
				Stadium: Celtic Park; Attendance: 28,000

28 November 1936 Division A	Celtic	3–1	Dunfermline Athletic	Glasgow
				Stadium: Celtic Park; Attendance: 7,000

5 December 1936 Division A	Falkirk	0–3	Celtic	Falkirk
				Stadium: Brockville Park; Attendance: 10,000

12 December 1936 Division A	Celtic	3–2	Motherwell	Glasgow
				Stadium: Celtic Park; Attendance: 10,000

19 December 1936 Division A	Queen of the South	1–0	Celtic	Dumfries
				Stadium: Palmerston Park; Attendance: 8,000

26 December 1936 Division A	Celtic	4–0	Albion Rovers	Glasgow
				Stadium: Celtic Park; Attendance: 4,000

1 January 1937 Division A	Rangers	1–0	Celtic	Glasgow
				Stadium: Ibrox Park; Attendance: 94,811

2 January 1937 Division A	Celtic	4–0	Queen's Park	Glasgow
				Stadium: Celtic Park; Attendance: 12,000

9 January 1937 Division A	Kilmarnock	3–3	Celtic	Kilmarnock
				Stadium: Rugby Park; Attendance: 12,000

16 January 1937 Division A	Celtic	3–3	Hamilton Academical	Glasgow
				Stadium: Celtic Park; Attendance: 12,000

23 January 1937 Division A	Aberdeen	1–0	Celtic	Aberdeen
				Stadium: Pittodrie Park; Attendance: 28,000

6 February 1937 Division A	Celtic	3–2	Hearts	Glasgow
				Stadium: Celtic Park; Attendance: 36,000

20 February 1937 Division A	Celtic	1–2	Dundee	Glasgow
				Stadium: Celtic Park; Attendance: 6,000

6 March 1937 Division A	Hibernian	2–2	Celtic	Edinburgh
				Stadium: Easter Road; Attendance: 18,000

20 March 1937 Division A	St Mirren	1–2	Celtic	Paisley
				Stadium: St Mirren Park, Love Street; Attendance: 10,000

27 March 1937 Division A	Celtic	1–1	Partick Thistle	Glasgow
				Stadium: Celtic Park; Attendance: 13,000

29 March 1937 Division A	Celtic	1–0	Falkirk	Glasgow
				Stadium: Celtic Park; Attendance: 7,000

6 April 1937 Division A	Third Lanark	4–2	Celtic	Glasgow
				Stadium: Cathkin Park; Attendance: 10,000

10 April 1937 Division A	Dunfermline Athletic	3–4	Celtic	Dunfermline
				Stadium: East End Park; Attendance: 10,000

16 April 1937 Division A	Celtic	5–1	Arbroath	Glasgow
				Stadium: Celtic Park; Attendance: 6,000

30 April 1937 Division A	Motherwell	8–0	Celtic	Motherwell
				Stadium: Fir Park; Attendance: 6,000

=== Scottish Cup ===
30 January 1937 First round	Stenhousemuir	1–1	Celtic	Stenhousemuir
				Stadium: Ochilview Park; Attendance: 3,000

3 February 1937 First round replay	Celtic	2–0	Stenhousemuir	Glasgow
				Stadium: Celtic Park; Attendance: 8,000

13 February 1937 Second round	Albion Rovers	2–5	Celtic	Coatbridge
				Stadium: Cliftonhill; Attendance: 19,000

27 February 1938 Third round	East Fife	0–3	Celtic	Methil
				Stadium: Bayview Park; Attendance: 12,690

17 March 1937 Fourth round	Celtic	4–4	Motherwell	Glasgow
				Stadium: Celtic Park; Attendance: 36,150

24 March 1937 Fourth round replay	Motherwell	1–2	Celtic	Motherwell
				Stadium: Fir Park; Attendance: 35,023

3 April 1937 Semi-final	Celtic	2–0	Clyde	Glasgow
				Stadium: Ibrox Park; Attendance: 76,000

24 April 1937 Final	Celtic	2–1	Aberdeen	Glasgow
				Stadium: Hampden Park; Attendance: 147,365
