= Andy Cowie =

Scottish footballer

Personal information
- Full name: Andrew David Cowie
- Date of birth: 11 March 1913
- Place of birth: Motherwell, Scotland
- Date of death: 19 January 1972 (aged 60)
- Place of death: Inverness, Scotland
- Position: Wing half

Senior career*
Years	Team	Apps	(Gls)
1935–1938	Dundee	61	(3)
1938–1948	Aberdeen	65	(0)
1948–1951	Swindon Town	89	(4)
Total		215	(7)

International career
1948	Scottish League XI	1	(0)
- * Club domestic league appearances and goals

Andy Cowie (11 March 1913 – 19 January 1972) was a professional footballer who played for Dundee, Aberdeen and Swindon Town. Cowie retired from football in 1951 and died in 1972.

== Career statistics ==
Appearances and goals by club, season and competition
Club	Season	League			Scottish Cup		League Cup		Europe		Total	
Club	Season	Division	Apps	Goals	Apps	Goals	Apps	Goals	Apps	Goals	Apps	Goals
Dundee	1935–36	Scottish Division One	1	0	0	0	–	–	–	–	1	0
Dundee	1936–37	Scottish Division One	6	0	1	0	–	–	–	–	7	0
Dundee	1937–38	Scottish Division One	37	2	1	0	–	–	–		38	2
Dundee	1938–39	Scottish Second Division	17	1	0	0	–	–	–	–	17	1
Dundee	Total		61	3	2	0	-	-	-	-	63	3
Aberdeen	1938–39	Scottish Division One	16	0	6	0	–	–	–	–	22	0
Aberdeen	1939–40	Scottish Division One	5	0	0	0	–	–	–	–	5	0
Aberdeen	1940–41	Competitive Football Cancelled Due to WW2										
Aberdeen	1941–42	Competitive Football Cancelled Due to WW2										
Aberdeen	1942–43	Competitive Football Cancelled Due to WW2										
Aberdeen	1943–44	Competitive Football Cancelled Due to WW2										
Aberdeen	1944–45	Competitive Football Cancelled Due to WW2										
Aberdeen	1945–46	Competitive Football Cancelled Due to WW2										
Aberdeen	1946–47	Scottish Division One	17	0	8	0	0	0	0	0	25	0
Aberdeen	1947–48	Scottish Division One	27	0	2	0	8	0	0	0	37	0
Aberdeen	Total		65	0	16	0	8	0	0	0	89	0
Swindon Town	1948–49	Third Division South	35	2	1	0	–	–	–	–	36	2
Swindon Town	1949–50	Third Division South	35	2	2	0	–	–	–	–	37	2
Swindon Town	1950–51	Third Division South	19	0	0	0	–	–	–	–	19	0
Swindon Town	Total		89	4	3	0	-	-	-	-	92	4
Career total			215	7	21	0	8	0	0	0	244	7
