= 2/6th Field Regiment (Australia) =

Australian Army artillery regiment

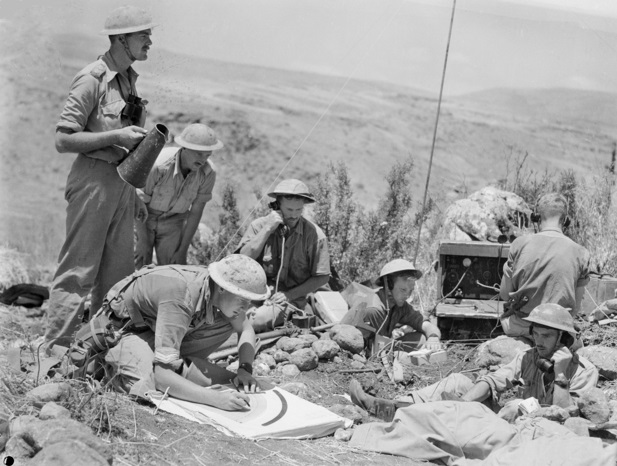
- Troop command post from the 2/6th Field Regiment during the Syria–Lebanon campaign, 1941
- Active: 1940–45
- Country: Australia
- Branch: Australian Military Forces
- Type: Regiment
- Role: Artillery
- Size: 3 batteries
- Part of: 7th Division
- Engagements: World War II: North African Campaign; Syria–Lebanon Campaign; Salamaua–Lae campaign; Huon Peninsula campaign; Borneo campaign

Insignia
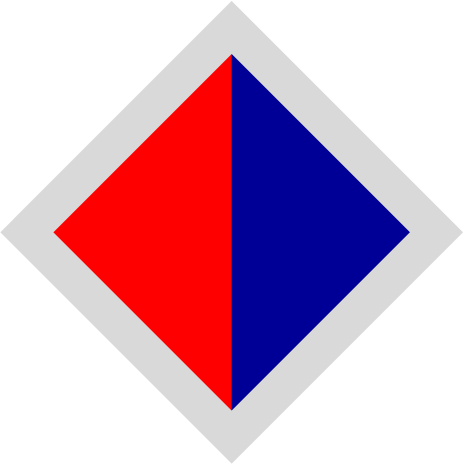
- Unit colour patch

The 2/6th Field Regiment was an Australian Army artillery regiment formed as part of the 7th Division in May 1940 for operations during World War II. The regiment served in Egypt and Syria in 1941–1942 before returning to Australia after Japan's entry in the war. Throughout 1943 and 1944, the regiment served against the Japanese in New Guinea. The regiment's involvement in the fighting in New Guinea saw it committed to several campaigns, including those around Salamaua and on the Huon Peninsula. Its final campaign of the war was fought on Borneo in mid-1945. Shortly after the conclusion of hostilities, the regiment was disbanded in late 1945.

== History ==
The 2/6th Field Regiment was raised in May 1940, as part of the 7th Division, which formed part of the all volunteer Second Australian Imperial Force that was raised for overseas service during the war. Its first commanding officer was Lieutenant Colonel Ralph Daly. The regiment consisted of three numbered batteries: 11th, 12th, and 56th, although upon formation only the first two were raised; the 56th was created in September 1941. The regiment was raised at Ingleburn, New South Wales, but moved to Bathurst in September 1940. The following month they embarked for the Middle East. By November, the regiment was located at Deir Suneid, in Palestine. In March 1941, the regiment was planned to move to Amiriya, in Egypt, where they were to receive the remaining equipment required to bring them up to establishment, after which they would deploy to Greece; these plans were changed following German advances in both North Africa and Greece. Instead, the regiment moved to Ikingi Maryut for equipping and then undertook defensive duties around Mersa Matruh.

The regiment remained in Egypt until May 1941, when it was moved to Palestine in preparation for its involvement in the Syria–Lebanon campaign. During the fighting against the Vichy French forces, the 2/6th Field Regiment was assigned to support the 25th Infantry Brigade, which advanced along the central route. In mid-June, the regiment supported efforts to capture Merdjayoun, with the 11th and 12th Batteries supporting actions around Khirbe and Khiam, and then supporting the attack on Jezzine. In response to a Vichy French counter-attack, the regiment returned to support further fighting around Merdjayoun, and then supported the 25th Infantry Brigade's continued advance towards Badarane and Rharife as part of the drive towards Beirut. The campaign ended with an armistice that was signed in mid-July.

The regiment remained in Syria after the armistice, forming part of the Allied occupation force, based around Tripoli. During this time, the regiment's third battery was raised. In response to Japan's entry into the war in December 1941, the Australian government requested the return of the 6th and 7th Divisions from the Middle East. As a result, in January 1942, the 2/6th was moved to Palestine, as part of preparations to embark for Australia. Departing in February, they arrived in Adelaide, South Australia, the following month. A short period of time was spent at Woodside Camp, before the regiment moved to Casino, New South Wales, and then Caboolture, Queensland in April and May, to occupy defensive positions to respond along the east coast in case of a Japanese invasion.

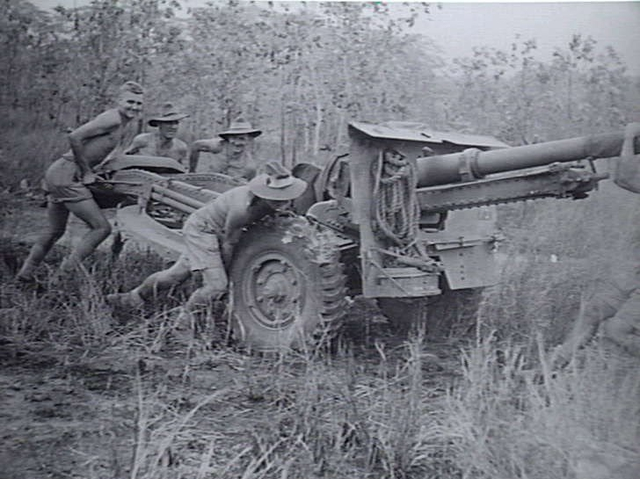
Gunners from the 2/6th around Port Moresby, September 1942

In September 1942, as fighting on the Kokoda Track intensified, the regiment deployed to New Guinea along with the 25th Infantry Brigade. It was initially deployed to defend against an advance on Port Moresby until February 1943, when they moved to Dobodura; with batteries deployed to Simeni, Soputa and the Kumusi River, the regiment's main role was to support troops mopping up isolated pockets of Japanese troops left in the area following the Allied counter-offensive along the Kokoda Track, and in the aftermath of the Battle of Buna–Gona. Throughout April to September, the regiment detached several elements to support US troops as part of the Salamaua–Lae campaign, landing at Tambu Bay during the Battle of Roosevelt Ridge; during this time several troops operated 155 mm guns. The 12th Battery and part of the 56th also deployed in support of the 9th Division during the landing at Lae. After November, the regiment concentrated around Finschaffen as part of the 9th Division to support operations during the Huon Peninsula campaign; when the 4th Infantry Brigade began the advance on Sio, the 2/6th Field Regiment was switched to support them until January 1944, when the regiment handed over its equipment to the 2/14th Field Regiment and embarked for Australia.

Upon arrival in Australia, the regiment established a camp at Warwick, Queensland. The Australian Army's adoption of the jungle division establishment reduced the allocation of field artillery regiments to each division to one, and as a result the 2/6th was deemed surplus to the 7th Division's requirements and was reassigned to a line of communications headquarters. Without a clear role or plan for future employment, the regiment was nearly disbanded, but eventually returned to the 7th Division at Kairi, Queensland, in October 1944. Further training took place on the Atherton Tablelands until the 7th Division was tasked with taking part in recapturing Borneo. Within this plan, the 2/6th was tasked with supporting the landing at Balikpapan. A preliminary move to Morotai Island took place in June 1945. For the initial landing on 1 July, the regiment was in reserve, but as the Australians advanced inland the regiment came ashore to support the 25th Infantry Brigade as they carried out final mopping up operations before the end of the war in August. The regiment's losses in its final campaign amounted to four killed.

The regiment was disbanded in late 1945. Throughout its involvement in the war, a total of 1,923 men served with the 2/6th Field Regiment of whom 19 were killed, and 61 wounded. The Australian War Memorial lists 25 members of the regiment who received decorations as a result of their service.

== Commanders ==
The 2/6th was commanded by the following officers:

- Lieutenant Colonel Ralph Daly
- Lieutenant Colonel John Reddish
- Lieutenant Colonel Francis St John

== Bibliography ==
- Bradley, Phillip (2010). To Salamaua. Port Melbourne, Victoria: Cambridge University Press. ISBN 9780521763905.
- Coulthard-Clark, Chris (1998). Where Australians Fought: The Encyclopaedia of Australia's Battles (First ed.). St Leonards, New South Wales: Allen & Unwin. ISBN 978-1864486117.
- Grey, Jeffrey (2008). A Military History of Australia (3rd ed.). Melbourne, Victoria: Cambridge University Press. ISBN 978-0-521-69791-0.
- Horner, David (1995). The Gunners: A History of Australian Artillery. Sydney, New South Wales: Allen & Unwin. ISBN 1-86373-917-3.
- Johnston, Mark (2005). The Silent 7th: An Illustrated History of the 7th Australian Division 1940–46. Crows Nest, New South Wales: Allen & Unwin. ISBN 1-74114-191-5.
- Long, Gavin (1963). The Final Campaigns. Australia in the War of 1939–1945. Vol. Series 1 – Army. Volume VII. Canberra: Australian War Memorial. OCLC 1297619.
- McKenzie-Smith, Graham (2018). The Unit Guide: The Australian Army 1939–1945, Volume 3. Warriewood, New South Wales: Big Sky Publishing. ISBN 978-1-925675-146.
