= Murray Peden (cricketer) =

Scottish cricketer

Personal information
- Full name: David Murray Peden
- Born: 4 November 1946; Edinburgh, Midlothian, Scotland
- Died: 12 March 1978 (aged 31); Dunfermline, Fife, Scotland
- Batting: Right-handed
- Bowling: Right-arm medium

Domestic team information
- Years: Team
- 1973–1976: Scotland

Career statistics
Competition	First-class
Matches	3
Runs scored	108
Batting average	21.60
100s/50s	–/–
Top score	45
Balls bowled	156
Wickets	2
Bowling average	37.00
5 wickets in innings	–
10 wickets in match	–
Best bowling	2/53
Catches/stumpings	–/–
- Source: Cricinfo, 20 October 2022

David Murray Peden (4 November 1946 — 12 March 1978) was a Scottish first-class cricketer.

Peden was born at Edinburgh in November 1946. A club cricketer for Fifeshire and later Stenhousemuir, Peden made his debut in first-class cricket for Scotland against Ireland at Cork in 1973. He made two further first-class appearances for Scotland, both against Ireland at Dublin in 1975 and Glasgow in 1976. With the bat, he scored 108 runs in his three first-class matches at an average of 21.60, with a highest score of 45. With his right-arm medium pace bowling, he took 2 wickets. Outside of cricket, Peden was a civil servant at Acas. He died suddenly at Dunfermline in March 1978.
