= Charlie McGillivray =

Scottish footballer and manager (1912–1986)

Personal information
- Full name: Charles McGillivray
- Date of birth: 5 July 1912
- Place of birth: Whitburn, West Lothian, Scotland
- Date of death: 7 November 1986 (aged 74)
- Height: 5 ft 8 in (1.73 m)
- Position: Outside right

Senior career*
Years	Team	Apps	(Gls)
?–1930	Dreghorn Juniors		
1930–1932	Ayr United	44	(19)
1932–1933	Celtic	4	(2)
1933–1934	Manchester United	8	(0)
1934–1938	Motherwell	41	(21)
1938–1944	Dundee	26	(29)
1944–1945	Dundee United		
1945–1946	Stirling Albion		

Managerial career
- 1944–1945: Dundee United
- * Club domestic league appearances and goals

Charles McGillivray (5 July 1912 – 7 November 1986) was a Scottish footballer and manager. His position was inside forward (winger).

== Career ==
Having previously played for Manchester United in England, and for Ayr United, Celtic, Motherwell and Dundee in Scotland (followed by several guest spells during World War II), McGillivray was playing for Dundee United when he accepted the offer to become manager in November 1944. The club's youngest ever manager, McGillivray was in charge for eleven months, resigning in late 1945 when it was announced the club were looking for somebody from outside to manage. McGillivray had the misfortune to preside over United's record home defeat (albeit in an unofficial wartime competition), a 9–1 loss to Aberdeen in February 1945.

He became Stirling Albion's player–coach in November 1945, leaving the club at end of the season. He later played five Eastern League games, scoring five times.
