= Dennis Quigley =

Scottish footballer

Personal information
- Full name: Dennis Quigley
- Date of birth: 7 December 1913
- Place of birth: St Andrews, Scotland
- Date of death: 1984 (aged 70–71)
- Position: Outside right

Senior career*
Years	Team	Apps	(Gls)
- St Andrews
- Dundee
- Brechin City
1936–1939	Grimsby Town	23	(2)
1939	Hull City	2	(0)
- * Club domestic league appearances and goals

Dennis Quigley (7 December 1913 – 1984) was a Scottish professional footballer.
