= Willie Phillips (footballer) =

Scottish footballer

Personal information
- Full name: William Nathaniel Phillips
- Date of birth: 15 February 1911
- Place of birth: Scotland
- Date of death: 1 September 1992 (aged 81)
- Place of death: Dundee, Scotland
- Position: Inside left

Senior career*
Years	Team	Apps	(Gls)
1935–1938	Dundee	60	(11)
1938–1946	Heart of Midlothian	8	(0)
1946	St Johnstone		
- * Club domestic league appearances and goals

William Nathaniel Phillips (15 February 1911 – 1 September 1992) was a Scottish professional footballer who played as an inside left in the Scottish League for Dundee and Heart of Midlothian.

== Career statistics ==
Appearances and goals by club, season and competition
Club	Season	League			Scottish Cup		Total	
Club	Season	Division	Apps	Goals	Apps	Goals	Apps	Goals
Dundee	1935–36	Scottish First Division	26	6	4	0	30	6
Dundee	1936–37	Scottish First Division	34	5	4	2	38	7
Dundee	Total		60	11	8	2	68	13
Heart of Midlothian	1938–39	Scottish First Division	8	0	0	0	8	0
Career total			68	11	8	2	76	13
