= Robert Cross (footballer) =

Scottish footballer

Personal information
- Full name: Robert McPherson Cross
- Date of birth: 24 May 1914
- Place of birth: Shettleston, Scotland
- Position: Centre half

Senior career*
| Years | Team | Apps | (Gls) |
| 1935–1940 | Queen's Park | 53 | (0) |

International career
| 1936–1939 | Scotland Amateurs | 4 | (0) |
- * Club domestic league appearances and goals

Robert McPherson Cross was a Scottish amateur footballer who played in the Scottish League for Queen's Park as a centre half. He was capped by Scotland at amateur level.
