= John Reddish (soldier) =

Australian soldier

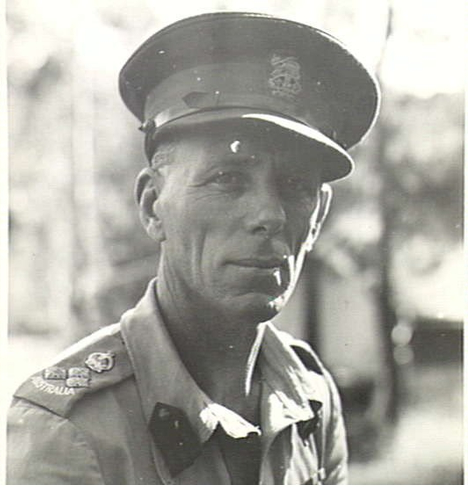
- Brigadier John Reddish in Queensland, March 1944
- Born: 19 May 1902; Croydon, New South Wales
- Died: 2 August 1971 (aged 69); North Balwyn, Victoria
- Military career
- Allegiance: Australia
- Branch: Citizen Military Forces; Second Australian Imperial Force
- Service years: 1926–1951
- Rank: Brigadier
- Nickname: Jack
- Commands: Royal Artillery, 6th Division (1943–45); 2/6th Field Regiment (1942–43); 2/4th Field Regiment (1942)
- Conflicts: Second World War
- Awards: Distinguished Service Order; Efficiency Decoration; Mentioned in Despatches (2)

Brigadier John Reddish, DSO, ED (19 May 1902 – 2 August 1971) was an Australian soldier who served on active service with the 6th Division during the Second World War.

== Early life and career ==
Reddish was born in Croydon, New South Wales, on 19 May 1902, the eldest of three children to Major John Reddish, a School Inspector and Military Cadet Instructor, and Mary Lavinia Reddish (née Sanders).

Jack Reddish served in the Citizen Military Forces and for a time was joined by his younger brother, George. Reddish was commissioned as a lieutenant into the Australian Field Artillery on 20 October 1926. Promotion to captain followed on 16 August 1931, and to major on 31 December 1936. By the outbreak of the Second World War, Reddish was Officer Commanding 114 Battery, 14th Field Brigade.

== Second World War ==
Reddish was commissioned into the Second Australian Imperial Force with the service number NX105 on 26 March 1940 and returned to the Citizen Military Forces on 15 October 1945. As a battery commander in the 2/6th Field Regiment, 7th Division he served in Palestine, Egypt, Mersa-Matruh and Syria. Reddish was awarded the Distinguished Service Order (DSO) for leadership during the Syria–Lebanon campaign. As lieutenant colonel he led his regiment against the Japanese in the New Guinea campaign, fighting in the Owen Stanley Ranges. He also took part in the Salamaua–Lae and Finschhafen actions. Along with the DSO, he was twice Mentioned in Despatches. Reddish was promoted to temporary lieutenant colonel on 15 April 1942 (made substantive on 1 September) and to colonel (temporary brigadier) on 17 November 1943. During his war service he commanded the 2/4th and the 2/6th Field Regiments. He rose to become Commander Royal Artillery of the 6th Division.

For his service in the Citizen Military Forces, Reddish was awarded the Efficiency Decoration. Granted the honorary rank of brigadier on 16 October 1945, Reddish retired from military service on 28 February 1951.

== Personal and later life ==
In civilian life Reddish was a senior manager for Mercantile Mutual in Melbourne. Reddish married Edna Kench on 15 November 1930 in Petersham, New South Wales and had two sons. He died at North Balwyn, Victoria on 2 August 1971.
