= Bobby Rankin =

Scottish footballer and manager

Personal information
- Full name: Robert Rankin
- Date of birth: 7 April 1905
- Place of birth: Paisley, Scotland
- Date of death: 25 August 1954 (aged 49)
- Place of death: Paisley, Scotland
- Position: Inside left

Senior career*
Years	Team	Apps	(Gls)
–	Kilwinning		
–	Strathclyde		
1926–1933	St Mirren	187	(67)
1933–1934	Beith		
1934–1935	Dundee	27	(7)
1935–1937	Clyde	58	(17)
1937–1942	St Mirren	62	(20)
Total		334	(111)

International career
1929	Scotland	3	(2)

Managerial career
- 1945–1954: St Mirren
- * Club domestic league appearances and goals

Robert Rankin (7 April 1905 – 25 August 1954) was a Scottish football player and manager. He played for hometown club St Mirren over two spells, and for Dundee and Clyde, mainly as an inside left. He gained three caps for Scotland in 1929, scoring twice.

He later acted as a director of St Mirren then served as manager of the club for eight seasons from 1946 (plus one wartime campaign prior to that), and was still in the post when he died in 1954 aged 49.
