= Tom Robertson (Scottish footballer) =

Scottish footballer

Personal information
- Full name: Thomas Hawthorn Robertson
- Date of birth: 1908
- Place of birth: Patna, Scotland
- Date of death: 1962 (aged 53–54)
- Place of death: Ayr, Scotland
- Positions: Outside right; right back

Senior career*
Years	Team	Apps	(Gls)
–	Tongue Rovers		
1929–1934	Ayr United	86	(28)
1934–1936	Dundee	73	(24)
1936–1939	Clyde	73	(14)
Total		232	(66)
- * Club domestic league appearances and goals

Thomas Hawthorn Robertson (1908 – 1962) was a Scottish footballer who played mostly as an outside right, though in his early career he was also utilised as a right back.

He played in the Scottish Football League's top division across a decade for Ayr United, Dundee and Clyde, with his most significant achievement coming at its end, when he was a member of the Clyde team that won the Scottish Cup in 1939. World War II then broke out, effectively ending his senior career; during the conflict, he featured for Ayr United again in unofficial competitions.

Robertson played in one edition of the Glasgow Football Association's annual challenge matches against Sheffield, scoring his side's consolation goal in the 1938 fixture, a 5–1 defeat.
