= John Reddish =

English footballer and cricketer

Jack Reddish
Personal information
- Full name: John Reddish
- Date of birth: 22 December 1904
- Place of birth: Nottingham, England
- Date of death: 1989 (aged 84–85)
- Position: Full back

Senior career*
Years	Team	Apps	(Gls)
- Boots Athletic
1929–1932	Tottenham Hotspur	6	(0)
1933–1934	Lincoln City	53	(0)
1935	Notts County	0	(0)
–	Dundee		
- * Club domestic league appearances and goals

John Reddish
Personal information
- Full name: John Reddish
- Born: 22 December 1904; Nottingham, Nottinghamshire, England
- Died: 18 October 1989 (aged 84); Manchester, Lancashire, England
- Batting: Right-handed
- Bowling: Leg break googly

Domestic team information
- Years: Team
- 1930: Nottinghamshire

Career statistics
Competition	First-class
Matches	1
Runs scored	2
Batting average	–
100s/50s	–/–
Top score	2*
Balls bowled	162
Wickets	–
Bowling average	–
5 wickets in innings	–
10 wickets in match	–
Best bowling	–
Catches/stumpings	1/–
- Source: Cricinfo, 3 October 2010

John Reddish (22 December 1904 – 18 October 1989), was an English footballer and cricketer. He played for Boots Athletic, Tottenham Hotspur, Lincoln City, Notts County and Dundee. He was born in Nottingham, Nottinghamshire.

Reddish began his career as footballer with local non-League club Boots Athletic. He joined Tottenham Hotspur in 1929 and played a total of seven matches in all competitions for the Spurs. After leaving White Hart Lane the full back joined Lincoln City where he made 53 appearances. Later on his career he had a spell at Notts County and finally Dundee.

As cricketer, Reddish was a right-handed batsman who bowled leg break googly; he made a single first-class appearance for Nottinghamshire against Oxford University in 1930.

He died at Manchester, Lancashire on 18 October 1989.
