= Bob Peden =

Scottish footballer

Personal information
- Full name: Robert George Cameron Peden
- Date of birth: 5 April 1906
- Place of birth: St Andrews, Scotland
- Date of death: 28 December 1985 (aged 79)
- Place of death: Dundee, Scotland
- Position: Goalkeeper

Senior career*
Years	Team	Apps	(Gls)
–1927	St Andrews University		
1927–1928	East Fife	10	(0)
1928–1933	Queen's Park	109	(0)
1933–1934	Dundee	1	(0)
- Hillcrest

International career
1929–1931	Scotland Amateurs	6	(0)
- * Club domestic league appearances and goals

Robert George Cameron Peden (5 April 1906 – 28 December 1985) was a Scottish amateur footballer who made over 100 appearances in the Scottish League for Queen's Park as a goalkeeper. He represented Scotland at amateur level.

== Personal life ==
Peden worked as a teacher.
