= Harry Ritchie (footballer) =

Scottish footballer

Personal information
- Full name: Henry Ritchie
- Date of birth: 18 February 1900
- Place of birth: Kirkcudbright, Scotland
- Date of death: 3 July 1941 (aged 41) (Note: Source for death details for Ritchie is an article announcing his passing, taken from the Perthshire Advertiser, dated 5 July 1941. This is available to view on the British Newspaper Archive website (or via FindMyPast) and also states that he was a native of Perth and that his father is John Ritchie, rather than Andrew as listed previously. He is not Henry McGill Ritchie (1898-1967).)
- Place of death: Nottingham, England
- Position: Outside right

Senior career*
Years	Team	Apps	(Gls)
–	Perth Roselea		
–	Perth Violet		
1919–1928	Hibernian	284	(77)
1928–1930	Everton	28	(5)
1930–1931	Dundee	41	(13)
1931–1934	St Johnstone	67	(13)
1934–1935	Brechin City	19	(4)
1935	Arbroath	2	(0)

International career
1921–1927	Scottish League XI	5	(0)
1923–1928	Scotland	2	(0)
- * Club domestic league appearances and goals

Henry Ritchie (18 February 1900 – 3 July 1941) was a Scottish footballer who played outside right for Hibernian, Everton, Dundee, St Johnstone, Brechin City and Scotland.

== Career ==
Ritchie was born in Kirkcudbrightnand raised in Perth, the son of John Ritchie. He was a member of the Royal Navy Volunteer Reserve at the end of the First World War before graduating via the junior football ranks to become a mainstay for Hibs throughout the 1920s, and a full Scottish international. He played in the Scottish Cup finals of both 1923 and 1924, though finished on the losing side in both.

In August 1928, English First Division side Everton brought Ritchie down to England team up again alongside his former Easter Road and current international teammate and right-wing partner Jimmy Dunn who had made the same move some months earlier. Hopes were high that, together again, Dunn and Ritchie would rekindle the dazzling form they had displayed together at Hibs and supply further ammunition for legendary Toffees striker William Ralph 'Dixie' Dean, who had just scored his record-breaking 60 goals as Everton became League Champions for the third time in 1927–28.

Both players struggled initially at Goodison Park and, though Dunn would find his feet and go on to win League Championship and FA Cup medals with Everton, Ritchie would return to Scotland, signing for Dundee in February 1930, barely 18 months after his arrival on Merseyside; he went on to have a successful spell with hometown club St Johnstone.

Following the end of his football career, Ritchie worked in the dairy industry, at first back home in Perthshire, then in Nottingham, where he died at Nottingham General Hospital on 3 July 1941, following an operation. He was 41 years of age. He was buried at Carlton Cemetery, Nottingham, on 7 July 1941.
