= Gibson McNaughton =

Scottish footballer

Personal information
- Full name: Gibson Norrie McNaughton
- Date of birth: 30 July 1911
- Place of birth: Broughty Ferry, Scotland
- Date of death: 1971 (aged 59–60)
- Height: 5 ft 9 1/2 in (1.77 m)
- Position: Inside forward

Senior career*
Years	Team	Apps	(Gls)
	Dundee Violet	?	(?)
	Clyde	?	(?)
	Dundee	?	(?)
	Dunfermline Athletic	?	(?)
1936–1939	Nottingham Forest	66	(12)
1939	Notts County	0	(0)
1947–1950	Ilkeston Town	74	(22)

Managerial career
- 1949–1950: Ilkeston Town
- * Club domestic league appearances and goals

Gibson Norrie McNaughton (30 July 1911 – 1971) was a Scottish professional footballer who played primarily as an inside forward, but also as a left-half.

McNaughton began his career in the Junior leagues with Dundee Violet before moving to the Scottish Football League with Clyde, Dundee and Dunfermline Athletic. In 1936 he transferred to English side Nottingham Forest, where he spent three years, scoring 12 goals in 66 English Football League matches during that time. McNaughton signed for city rivals Notts County in 1939, but football in England was abandoned shortly afterwards due to the outbreak of the Second World War.

After the war ended, McNaughton joined non-league side Ilkeston Town. He made 74 appearances for the club and scored 22 goals. During the 1949–50 season, he had a spell as player–manager of Ilkeston before leaving in the summer of 1950.
