= Peter Gavigan =

Scottish footballer (1897–1977)

Personal information
- Full name: Peter Gavigan
- Date of birth: 11 December 1897
- Place of birth: Gorbals, Scotland
- Date of death: 2 March 1977 (aged 79)
- Place of death: Dundee, Scotland
- Height: 5 ft 6 in (1.68 m)
- Position: Outside right

Senior career*
| Years | Team | Apps | (Gls) |
- Vale of Clyde
| 1920–1924 | Fulham | 72 | (1) |
| 1924–1925 | Clapton Orient | 62 | (4) |
- Bilston United
| 1927–1930 | St Johnstone | 77 | (7) |
| 1930–1932 | Dundee | 48 | (1) |
| 1932 | Montrose | 4 | (2) |
| 1932–1933 | Dundee United | 13 | (0) |
- * Club domestic league appearances and goals

Peter Gavigan (11 December 1897 – 2 March 1977) was a Scottish footballer who played in the Football League for Clapton Orient and Fulham as an outside right.

After three seasons in Scottish Division One with St Johnstone, two years at Dundee and a short period at Montrose, his final spell was with Dundee United in Division Two, signing on 9 December 1932 and making his debut against Brechin City the following day. He made 13 league appearances for the club in 1932–33 and was released at the end of the season.

Gavigan's grandson, Peter Loudon, is on the board of directors at St Johnstone.
