= Arthur Baxter (footballer) =

English footballer

Personal information
- Full name: Arthur George Baxter
- Date of birth: 28 December 1911
- Place of birth: Dundee, Scotland
- Date of death: 5 September 1944 (aged 32)
- Place of death: Rimini, Fascist Italy
- Height: 5 ft 9 in (1.75 m)
- Position: Inside forward

Senior career*
Years	Team	Apps	(Gls)
1932	Dundee North End		
1933–1934	Portsmouth	0	(0)
1934–1936	Falkirk	41	(10)
1936–1939	Dundee	103	(45)
1938–1939	Barnsley	6	(3)
Total		184	(62)
- * Club domestic league appearances and goals

Arthur George Baxter (28 December 1911 – 5 September 1944) was a Scottish professional footballer who played as an inside forward in the Scottish Football League for Falkirk and Dundee and in the Football League for Barnsley.

== Personal life ==
Baxter served as a private in the London Scottish of the Gordon Highlanders during the Second World War. He was killed during the Battle of Rimini on 5 September 1944 and was buried at the Gradara War Cemetery.

== Career statistics ==
Appearances and goals by club, season and competition
Club	Season	League			Cup		Total	
Club	Season	Division	Apps	Goals	Apps	Goals	Apps	Goals
Falkirk	1934–35	Scottish Division One	28	9	1	—	29	9
Falkirk	1935–36	Scottish Division Two	12	1	—		12	1
Falkirk	Total		40	10	1	–	41	10
Dundee	1935–36	Scottish Division One	8	4	—		8	4
Dundee	1936–37	Scottish Division One	38	12	4	1	42	13
Dundee	1937–38	Scottish Division One	38	23	1	1	39	24
Dundee	1938–39	Scottish Division Two	14	4	—		14	4
Dundee	Total		98	43	5	2	103	45
Barnsley	1938–39	Third Division North	6	3	0	0	6	3
Dundee United	1939–40	Eastern Regional	25	3	7	0	32	3
Aberdeen	1941–42	North Eastern League	2	1	0	0	2	1
Career total			171	60	13	2	184	62
