= Len Richards =

Welsh footballer (1911–1985)

Personal information
- Full name: Leonard George Richards
- Date of birth: 13 April 1911
- Place of birth: Barry, Wales
- Date of death: 27 December 1985 (aged 74)
- Place of death: Newport, Wales
- Position: Full back

Senior career*
| Years | Team | Apps | (Gls) |
| 1931–1932 | Tottenham Hotspur | 0 | (0) |
| 1932–1933 | Cardiff City | 1 | (0) |
| 1933–1935 | Dundalk | 28 | (0) |
| 1935–1938 | Dundee | | |
| 1938–1939 | Newport County | 33 | (0) |

International career
| 1935 | League of Ireland XI | 1 | (0) |
- * Club domestic league appearances and goals

Leonard George Richards (13 April 1911 — 27 December 1985) was a Welsh professional footballer who played as a full back. He played in the Football League for Cardiff City and Newport County and in Ireland and Scotland for Dundalk and Dundee.

== Career ==
Richards, a Welsh schoolboy international, began his career with Tottenham Hotspur but was unable to break into the club's first team and left in 1932 having made no appearances. He joined Cardiff City and was handed his professional debut in October 1932 in a match against Luton Town in which Cardiff suffered an 8–1 defeat. He remained with the club until the end of the season but made no further appearances before being released.

In November 1933, he signed for Irish side Dundalk as a replacement for Gordon McDiarmuid. Virtually ever present for the side, he was a losing finalist on three occasions in three different competitions during two seasons. His performances led to a call up to the League of Ireland XI in 1935 where he played against a Welsh League XI. He signed for Dundee in 1935 where he spent three seasons before following manager Billy McCandless to Newport County in 1938. In his first season, he helped the side win the Third Division South title before the outbreak of World War II brought an end to his professional career. During wartime, he played for Lovell's Athletic.

== Later life ==
After the end of World War II, Richards worked for Alcan.

== Honours ==
Dundalk

- LFA President's Cup finalist: 1933–1934
- FAI Cup finalist: 1934–1935
- Leinster Senior Cup finalist: 1934–35

Newport County

- Football League Third Division South winner: 1938–39
