= Bert Adamson =

Scottish footballer

Robert McClellan Adamson (21 May 1914 – 1995) was a Scottish professional footballer who played as a left half for a number of British clubs.

== Life and career ==
Adamson was born in Balbeggie; he played for Hearts and Dundee before moving to Welsh side Wrexham. After switching to English side Carlisle United, Adamson moved north to Dundee United. It is unknown where Adamson went immediately after leaving United at the beginning of the 1942–43 season, although he also played for East Fife at some point.

== Personal life ==
Adamson's son-in-law is Tommy Campbell, former Arbroath manager and current youth coach of St Johnstone.
