= 1934–35 Scottish Division One =

36th season of top-tier football league in Scotland

Scottish Division One
- Season: 1934–35
- Champions: Rangers
- Relegated: St Mirren; Falkirk

The 1934–35 Scottish Division One season was won by Rangers by three points over city rival Celtic. St Mirren and Falkirk finished 19th and 20th respectively and were relegated to the 1935–36 Scottish Division Two.

== League table ==
Pos	Team	Pld	W	D	L	GF	GA	GD	Pts
1	Rangers	38	25	5	8	96	46	+50	55
2	Celtic	38	24	4	10	92	45	+47	52
3	Hearts	38	20	10	8	87	51	+36	50
4	Hamilton Academical	38	19	10	9	87	67	+20	48
5	St Johnstone	38	18	10	10	66	46	+20	46
6	Aberdeen	38	17	10	11	68	54	+14	44
7	Motherwell	38	15	10	13	83	64	+19	40
8	Dundee	38	16	8	14	63	63	0	40
9	Kilmarnock	38	16	6	16	76	68	+8	38
10	Clyde	38	14	10	14	71	69	+2	38
11	Hibernian	38	14	8	16	59	70	−11	36
12	Queen's Park	38	13	10	15	61	80	−19	36
13	Partick Thistle	38	15	5	18	61	68	−7	35
14	Airdrieonians	38	13	7	18	64	72	−8	33
15	Dunfermline Athletic	38	13	5	20	56	96	−40	31
16	Albion Rovers	38	10	9	19	62	77	−15	29
17	Queen of the South	38	11	7	20	52	72	−20	29
18	Ayr United	38	12	5	21	61	112	−51	29
19	St Mirren	38	11	5	22	49	70	−21	27
20	Falkirk	38	9	6	23	58	82	−24	24

Source: RSSSF

== Results ==
Home \ Away	ABE	AIR	ALB	AYR	CEL	CLY	DND	DNF	FAL	HAM	HOM	HIB	KIL	MOT	PAR	QOS	QPA	RAN	STJ	STM
Aberdeen		1–3	1–1	7–1	2–0	2–1	3–0	3–0	1–0	3–3	1–0	2–0	1–3	2–2	3–0	1–0	5–0	1–3	2–0	1–0
Airdrieonians	4–1		3–0	3–2	0–2	0–0	0–3	2–3	2–1	2–2	4–7	7–0	3–2	2–0	0–2	3–1	4–2	1–2	1–1	1–0
Albion Rovers	1–1	0–3		8–0	2–1	4–1	1–2	1–2	0–0	4–1	2–2	2–0	1–0	2–3	2–0	3–2	0–0	1–5	2–4	2–3
Ayr United	0–3	2–1	0–1		1–0	2–3	3–2	1–3	3–1	1–2	0–3	1–1	2–1	1–0	3–2	1–1	5–1	2–4	3–0	1–0
Celtic	4–1	2–0	5–1	7–0		0–2	4–0	3–0	7–3	3–1	4–2	4–0	4–1	3–2	3–1	1–2	4–1	1–1	0–0	2–1
Clyde	1–1	3–0	1–1	5–1	0–3		2–2	2–1	3–0	3–3	0–1	3–2	1–1	3–3	3–4	1–2	3–0	2–1	4–1	5–2
Dundee	0–0	2–0	3–2	5–4	0–0	2–2		1–1	1–0	2–1	1–5	0–2	0–2	3–1	2–0	5–0	4–1	3–2	1–2	0–2
Dunfermline Athletic	1–1	1–1	1–3	1–2	1–3	4–2	2–5		2–1	4–1	1–2	2–1	2–2	1–0	2–1	3–1	2–2	1–7	1–2	3–2
Falkirk	3–2	2–4	3–0	8–1	1–2	2–4	1–1	2–0		1–2	0–2	5–2	5–2	0–3	1–2	3–1	1–1	0–3	3–0	1–1
Hamilton Academical	6–1	5–0	4–2	3–2	4–2	4–3	1–1	3–0	1–2		2–0	2–1	4–2	6–1	2–1	1–1	2–2	2–1	2–2	4–0
Heart of Midlothian	2–1	1–0	4–0	5–0	0–0	2–0	1–1	0–1	4–1	1–1		5–2	2–2	2–1	1–2	4–2	2–1	4–1	2–2	0–1
Hibernian	2–3	2–2	3–3	1–1	3–2	4–0	2–1	3–1	2–0	3–1	1–0		1–0	1–1	2–0	1–1	5–1	1–2	1–1	0–0
Kilmarnock	1–3	0–0	2–1	6–3	2–3	2–0	2–0	1–3	4–1	4–1	3–3	0–1		3–3	2–0	3–1	5–0	1–3	1–0	1–4
Motherwell	1–2	3–2	5–2	2–3	1–0	1–1	5–3	9–3	5–2	0–0	2–2	4–1	3–2		4–1	4–0	3–0	2–2	0–1	3–0
Partick Thistle	2–1	4–1	1–0	1–1	1–3	0–0	1–4	7–1	2–2	0–1	1–3	3–1	4–2	1–1		2–1	2–2	1–0	3–0	2–1
Queen of the South	2–1	1–1	1–0	7–1	3–4	1–0	1–0	2–0	1–1	4–1	1–3	0–2	0–1	2–3	2–4		1–0	2–3	0–2	2–0
Queen's Park	1–1	4–2	1–1	5–4	1–0	0–1	4–0	1–0	4–0	3–4	3–3	3–1	1–4	1–1	3–1	2–1		0–4	2–1	4–1
Rangers	2–2	3–1	2–2	2–0	2–1	4–2	3–1	8–1	1–0	1–1	2–1	4–2	2–3	1–0	4–0	5–0	0–1		3–1	1–0
St Johnstone	1–1	4–1	2–0	4–0	0–1	5–2	0–1	5–1	4–0	3–1	2–2	2–0	2–1	2–1	2–1	1–1	0–0	2–0		4–0
St Mirren	3–0	1–0	5–4	3–3	2–4	1–2	0–1	3–0	2–1	1–2	2–4	1–2	0–2	1–0	2–1	1–1	2–3	0–2	1–1	

Legend: Blue = home team win; Yellow = draw; Red = away team win.
