= Jimmy Bissett =

Scottish footballer

Personal information
- Full name: James Thompson Bissett
- Date of birth: 19 June 1898
- Place of birth: Lochee, Dundee, Scotland
- Height: 6 ft 0 in (1.83 m)
- Position: Right back

Senior career*
Years	Team	Apps	(Gls)
–	Dundee		
1920–1922	Everton	0	(0)
–	Ebbw Vale		
1922–1923	Southend United	33	(0)
1923–1924	Rochdale	42	(3)
1924–1926	Middlesbrough	33	(0)
1926–1927	Lincoln City	32	(6)
–	Dundee		
–	Raith Rovers		

Managerial career
- 1928–1933: Dundee
- * Club domestic league appearances and goals

James Thompson Bissett (19 June 1898 – after 1932) was a Scottish footballer who made 140 appearances in the Football League playing for Southend United, Rochdale, Middlesbrough and Lincoln City. He played as a right back. He was manager of Dundee from 1928 to 1933.

== Life and career ==
Bissett was born in Lochee, Dundee, and began his football career with his local professional club, Dundee F.C. He moved to England in early 1920 to sign for Football League First Division club Everton for a £250 fee, At the end of the season he was transfer-listed at the same valuation, but by October, when the player applied to have the fee reduced, the directors decided to invite offers. Interest from Southern League club Ebbw Vale did not result in a permanent move, and eventually, in the 1922 close season, Bissett was allowed to leave on a free transfer to Southend United of the Third Division South.

He made his debut on the opening day of the 1922–23 Football League season in a 2–0 win away at Newport County: according to the Daily Express, "[his] work left nothing to be desired". He played regularly for Southend, and the following season was ever-present for Rochdale, and converted three penalties, as they finished second in the Third Division North, only one point behind champions Wolverhampton Wanderers. He signed for Middlesbrough, newly relegated from the First Division, as soon as the season ended.

Bissett went straight into Middlesbrough's starting eleven for the new campaign, and was a regular selection until the end of January 1925. He next appeared for the first team more than a year later, playing the last nine matches of the 1925–26 season. He then returned to the Third Division, signing for Lincoln City for what the Express called "a substantial fee". He played in 32 matches in his first season, and in the opening match of the next, and then returned to his native Scotland where he was on the books of Dundee and Raith Rovers.

From 1928 to 1933, Bissett was manager of Dundee.
