= Alex Troup =

Scottish footballer

Personal information
- Full name: Alexander Troup
- Date of birth: 4 May 1895
- Place of birth: Forfar, Scotland
- Date of death: 1951 (aged 55–56)
- Height: 5 ft 6 in (1.68 m)
- Position: Winger

Youth career
- Forfar Athletic

Senior career*
Years	Team	Apps	(Gls)
1915–1917	Dundee	41	(8)
1917–1918	Ayr United	4	(0)
1918–1923	Dundee	133	(16)
1923–1930	Everton	260	(35)
1930–1933	Dundee	108	(19)
Total		546	(78)

International career
1920–1926	Scotland	5	(0)
1921	Scottish League XI	2	(0)
- * Club domestic league appearances and goals

Alexander Troup (4 May 1895 – 1951) was a Scottish footballer who played at both professional and international levels as a winger.

== Career ==
Born in Forfar, Troup played club football in Scotland and England for Dundee and Everton.

Troup made five appearances for the Scotland national team between 1920 and 1926. He also played for the Scottish League XI twice in 1921.
