= Colin McNab (footballer) =

Scottish footballer

Personal information
- Full name: Colin Duncan McNab
- Date of birth: 6 April 1902
- Place of birth: Loudoun, Scotland
- Date of death: 25 November 1970 (aged 68)
- Place of death: Arbroath, Scotland
- Position: Right half

Senior career*
Years	Team	Apps	(Gls)
–	Musselburgh Bruntonians		
1924–1934	Dundee	263	(17)
1934–1936	Arbroath	57	(10)
Total		320	(27)

International career
1937–1930	Scottish League XI	5	(0)
1930–1932	Scotland	6	(0)
- * Club domestic league appearances and goals

Colin Duncan McNab (6 April 1902 – 25 November 1970, also spelled MacNab) was a Scottish footballer who played as a right half for Dundee, Arbroath and Scotland.
