= Harry Smith (Scottish footballer) =

Scottish footballer

Personal information
- Full name: Harold McPherson Smith
- Date of birth: 14 October 1911
- Place of birth: Dundee, Scotland
- Height: 5 ft 8 in (1.73 m)
- Position: Inside forward

Senior career*
Years	Team	Apps	(Gls)
–1930	Logie		
1930–1933	Dundee	36	(5)
1933–1934	Raith Rovers	11	(2)
1934–1946	Clapton Orient	148	(34)
1946	Dundee United	0	(0)
- * Club domestic league appearances and goals

Harold McPherson Smith was a Scottish professional footballer who made over 140 appearances in the Football League for Clapton Orient as an inside forward. He also played in the Scottish League for Dundee and Raith Rovers.

== Career statistics ==
Appearances and goals by club, season and competition
Club	Season	League			National Cup		Total	
Club	Season	Division	Apps	Goals	Apps	Goals	Apps	Goals
Dundee	1930–31	Scottish First Division	7	0	0	0	7	0
Dundee	1931–32	Scottish First Division	12	2	2	0	14	2
Dundee	1932–33	Scottish First Division	15	3	0	0	15	3
Dundee	1933–34	Scottish First Division	2	0	0	0	2	0
Dundee	Total		36	5	2	0	38	5
Raith Rovers	1933–34	Scottish Second Division	11	2	1	0	12	2
Career total			47	7	3	0	50	7
