= Jimmy Robertson (footballer, born 1909) =

Scottish footballer

Personal information
- Full name: James Edward Robertson
- Date of birth: 1909
- Place of birth: Dundee, Scotland
- Date of death: 1979 (aged 70)
- Place of death: Cupar, Scotland
- Position: Centre forward

Senior career*
Years	Team	Apps	(Gls)
- Lochee United
- Logie Thistle
1928–1933	Dundee	157	(47)
1933–1934	Birmingham	6	(1)
1934–1938	Kilmarnock	107	(54)

International career
1931	Scotland	2	(0)
- * Club domestic league appearances and goals

James Edward Robertson (1909–1979) was a professional footballer who won two caps for the Scotland national football team. He made more than 150 appearances in the First Division of the Scottish Football League for Dundee, and also played in the English Football League for Birmingham and the Scottish First Division for Kilmarnock.

== Life and career ==
Robertson was born in Dundee in 1909. A centre forward, he played for junior clubs Lochee United and Logie Thistle before joining Dundee in June 1928. In a five-and-a-half-year career with the club, he scored 50 goals in 169 games in all competitions, of which 47 goals came from 157 games in the First Division. At the end of the 1930–31 season, Robertson was included in the squad for Scotland's European tour; he played in two full international matches, a 5–0 defeat to Austria on 16 May 1931 and a 3–0 defeat to Italy four days later.

In December 1933, English First Division club Birmingham paid £1,250 for Robertson's services, seeing him as a potential successor to the prolific Joe Bradford who was coming to the end of his career. He went straight into the starting eleven and played six consecutive games, scoring once, but he suffered badly from homesickness, which affected his play, and at the end of the season he returned to Scotland to join First Division club Kilmarnock for a fee of £1,000. He maintained a scoring rate of a goal every other game while at Kilmarnock, and retired from the game in 1938.

Robertson died in 1979 in Cupar at the age of 70.
