= Lew Morgan =

Scottish footballer

Personal information
- Full name: Lewis Morgan
- Date of birth: 30 April 1911
- Place of birth: Cowdenbeath, Scotland
- Date of death: 22 September 1988 (aged 77)
- Place of death: Portsmouth, England
- Position: Full back

Senior career*
Years	Team	Apps	(Gls)
1928–1929	Crossgates Primrose		
1929–1930	Lochgelly Celtic		
1930–1931	Bowhill Rovers		
1931–1935	Dundee	143	(2)
1935–1939	Portsmouth	123	(0)
1946–1947	Watford	50	(0)
- Chelmsford City

International career
1933	Scottish League XI	1	(0)
- * Club domestic league appearances and goals

Lewis Morgan (30 April 1911 – 22 September 1988) was a Scottish professional football player who played as a right back.

Born in Cowdenbeath, Morgan represented Scotland at schoolboy level and played for various Scottish junior clubs before joining Dundee in 1931. He represented the Scottish League in 1933. Morgan transferred to English side Portsmouth two years later, playing mostly at left back, and he was part of the Portsmouth team that beat Wolves 4–1 in the 1939 FA Cup Final. After the Second World War he joined Watford, playing 50 Football League games for them before being released on a free transfer. Morgan then played for Chelmsford City, signing for the club in May 1948.

== Honours ==
Portsmouth

- FA Cup: 1938–39
