= 1936–37 Scottish Division One =

38th season of top-tier football league in Scotland

Scottish Division One
- Season: 1936–37
- Champions: Rangers
- Relegated: Dunfermline Athletic; Albion Rovers

The 1936–37 Scottish Division One season was won by Rangers by seven points over nearest rival Aberdeen. Dunfermline Athletic and Albion Rovers finished 19th and 20th respectively and were relegated to the 1937–38 Scottish Division Two.

== League table ==
| Pos | Team | Pld | W | D | L | GF | GA | GD | Pts |
|---|---|---|---|---|---|---|---|---|---|
| 1 | Rangers | 38 | 26 | 9 | 3 | 88 | 32 | +56 | 61 |
| 2 | Aberdeen | 38 | 23 | 8 | 7 | 89 | 44 | +45 | 54 |
| 3 | Celtic | 38 | 22 | 8 | 8 | 89 | 58 | +31 | 52 |
| 4 | Motherwell | 38 | 22 | 7 | 9 | 96 | 54 | +42 | 51 |
| 5 | Heart of Midlothian | 38 | 24 | 3 | 11 | 99 | 60 | +39 | 51 |
| 6 | Third Lanark | 38 | 20 | 6 | 12 | 79 | 61 | +18 | 46 |
| 7 | Falkirk | 38 | 19 | 6 | 13 | 98 | 66 | +32 | 44 |
| 8 | Hamilton Academical | 38 | 18 | 5 | 15 | 91 | 96 | −5 | 41 |
| 9 | Dundee | 38 | 12 | 15 | 11 | 58 | 69 | −11 | 39 |
| 10 | Clyde | 38 | 16 | 6 | 16 | 59 | 70 | −11 | 38 |
| 11 | Kilmarnock | 38 | 14 | 9 | 15 | 60 | 70 | −10 | 37 |
| 12 | St Johnstone | 38 | 14 | 8 | 16 | 74 | 68 | +6 | 36 |
| 13 | Partick Thistle | 38 | 11 | 12 | 15 | 73 | 68 | +5 | 34 |
| 14 | Arbroath | 38 | 13 | 5 | 20 | 57 | 84 | −27 | 31 |
| 15 | Queen's Park | 38 | 9 | 12 | 17 | 51 | 77 | −26 | 30 |
| 16 | St Mirren | 38 | 11 | 7 | 20 | 68 | 81 | −13 | 29 |
| 17 | Hibernian | 38 | 6 | 13 | 19 | 54 | 83 | −29 | 25 |
| 18 | Queen of the South | 38 | 8 | 8 | 22 | 49 | 95 | −46 | 24 |
| 19 | Dunfermline Athletic | 38 | 5 | 11 | 22 | 65 | 98 | −33 | 21 |
| 20 | Albion Rovers | 38 | 5 | 6 | 27 | 53 | 116 | −63 | 16 |

Source: RSSSF

== Results ==
| Home \ Away | ABE | ALB | ARB | CEL | CLY | DND | DNF | FAL | HAM | HOM | HIB | KIL | MOT | PAR | QOS | QPA | RAN | STJ | STM | THI |
|---|---|---|---|---|---|---|---|---|---|---|---|---|---|---|---|---|---|---|---|---|
| Aberdeen | | 4–1 | 4–0 | 1–0 | 3–0 | 3–1 | 3–1 | 4–0 | 3–0 | 4–0 | 1–1 | 2–0 | 2–0 | 4–2 | 1–1 | 2–1 | 1–1 | 4–1 | 5–4 | 2–2 |
| Albion Rovers | 1–5 | | 2–0 | 1–3 | 1–1 | 1–1 | 4–0 | 1–4 | 2–3 | 1–3 | 4–0 | 1–3 | 1–4 | 2–4 | 4–0 | 2–3 | 2–3 | 0–4 | 2–6 | 0–4 |
| Arbroath | 1–4 | 4–2 | | 2–3 | 2–1 | 3–0 | 1–1 | 1–2 | 1–2 | 0–3 | 1–0 | 0–0 | 0–0 | 2–1 | 4–0 | 2–0 | 0–0 | 3–1 | 2–2 | 4–1 |
| Celtic | 3–2 | 4–0 | 5–1 | | 3–1 | 1–2 | 3–1 | 1–0 | 3–3 | 3–2 | 5–1 | 2–4 | 3–2 | 1–1 | 5–0 | 4–0 | 1–1 | 3–2 | 3–0 | 6–3 |
| Clyde | 0–0 | 4–1 | 4–2 | 1–1 | | 1–2 | 2–1 | 2–2 | 4–3 | 2–1 | 1–3 | 2–0 | 1–2 | 1–0 | 2–1 | 0–2 | 3–2 | 2–0 | 1–1 | 2–4 |
| Dundee | 2–2 | 1–0 | 6–1 | 0–0 | 2–2 | | 2–2 | 1–1 | 1–2 | 1–0 | 3–1 | 2–2 | 0–0 | 2–2 | 1–3 | 2–2 | 0–0 | 3–1 | 4–0 | 3–2 |
| Dunfermline Athletic | 2–2 | 3–3 | 1–4 | 3–4 | 1–3 | 3–4 | | 0–2 | 4–2 | 2–5 | 2–3 | 0–5 | 2–2 | 1–1 | 5–0 | 2–2 | 2–3 | 0–0 | 1–0 | 0–0 |
| Falkirk | 0–2 | 3–2 | 0–1 | 0–3 | 6–0 | 5–0 | 6–4 | | 3–2 | 3–0 | 4–1 | 5–0 | 1–1 | 4–1 | 5–2 | 1–2 | 0–2 | 3–0 | 5–1 | 5–2 |
| Hamilton Academical | 3–2 | 2–3 | 1–4 | 1–2 | 2–1 | 5–1 | 4–2 | 3–2 | | 5–1 | 4–1 | 2–2 | 2–3 | 3–2 | 1–1 | 5–2 | 1–5 | 5–2 | 2–1 | 3–1 |
| Heart of Midlothian | 2–0 | 5–0 | 4–1 | 0–1 | 2–1 | 4–0 | 3–2 | 3–1 | 6–0 | | 3–2 | 5–0 | 3–4 | 5–1 | 4–2 | 3–1 | 4–2 | 3–1 | 2–1 | 5–2 |
| Hibernian | 1–3 | 1–1 | 4–1 | 2–2 | 0–1 | 0–0 | 0–0 | 2–2 | 5–4 | 3–3 | | 0–0 | 1–2 | 2–2 | 2–2 | 2–3 | 1–4 | 3–3 | 0–0 | 0–1 |
| Kilmarnock | 1–2 | 3–1 | 2–0 | 3–3 | 3–1 | 1–1 | 3–3 | 3–2 | 2–2 | 3–0 | 3–2 | | 0–1 | 1–0 | 1–0 | 0–0 | 1–2 | 4–2 | 2–1 | 0–3 |
| Motherwell | 1–0 | 9–1 | 3–1 | 8–0 | 4–1 | 2–1 | 6–0 | 4–2 | 5–2 | 1–3 | 3–4 | 2–1 | | 4–2 | 4–1 | 3–1 | 1–4 | 2–2 | 4–1 | 1–2 |
| Partick Thistle | 0–2 | 6–1 | 3–1 | 1–1 | 6–0 | 1–1 | 0–4 | 2–2 | 2–3 | 2–2 | 3–1 | 4–0 | 1–0 | | 3–1 | 5–1 | 0–1 | 1–1 | 1–1 | 1–3 |
| Queen of the South | 2–3 | 5–2 | 2–3 | 1–0 | 1–2 | 2–3 | 2–1 | 1–4 | 3–3 | 0–4 | 1–0 | 1–0 | 0–2 | 3–3 | | 1–1 | 0–1 | 1–1 | 1–2 | 1–0 |
| Queen's Park | 1–1 | 3–3 | 2–1 | 0–2 | 1–3 | 0–2 | 0–2 | 3–6 | 0–1 | 0–2 | 2–0 | 2–1 | 0–0 | 2–2 | 2–3 | | 1–1 | 2–2 | 2–2 | 1–2 |
| Rangers | 2–1 | 1–0 | 4–0 | 1–0 | 2–0 | 3–0 | 5–3 | 3–0 | 4–0 | 0–1 | 4–0 | 8–0 | 3–2 | 3–1 | 1–1 | 1–1 | | 0–0 | 2–0 | 3–1 |
| St Johnstone | 2–1 | 4–0 | 6–1 | 2–1 | 2–1 | 3–3 | 1–0 | 1–0 | 6–1 | 3–0 | 3–1 | 1–3 | 1–3 | 0–2 | 4–0 | 4–1 | 1–2 | | 4–2 | 2–3 |
| St Mirren | 1–4 | 3–0 | 5–0 | 1–2 | 1–3 | 4–0 | 2–1 | 3–3 | 1–2 | 2–2 | 1–3 | 3–2 | 3–0 | 1–3 | 6–2 | 1–2 | 1–4 | 2–1 | | 2–1 |
| Third Lanark | 2–0 | 0–0 | 3–2 | 4–2 | 0–2 | 4–0 | 6–3 | 2–3 | 3–2 | 3–0 | 1–1 | 2–1 | 1–1 | 1–0 | 4–1 | 1–2 | 0–0 | 2–0 | 3–0 | |

Legend: Blue = home team win; Yellow = draw; Red = away team win.
