= Jimmy Guthrie (footballer) =

Scottish footballer

James Wallace Tayor Guthrie (6 June 1912 – 10 September 1981) was a Scottish footballer who played for Luncarty City Boys, Perth Thistle F.C. and Scone Thistle before joining Dundee for the 1932–33 season. In August 1937 he was transferred to Portsmouth of the English First Division for a fee of £4,000.

== Honours ==
Portsmouth

- FA Cup: 1938–39
