= 1969–70 Kilmarnock F.C. season =

Kilmarnock
1969–70 season
- Manager: Walter McCrae
- Scottish First Division: 6th
- Scottish Cup: SF
- Scottish League Cup: GS
- Inter-Cities Fairs Cup: R3
- Top goalscorer: League: Ross Mathie 21; All: Ross Mathie 30
- Highest home attendance: 23,821 (v Celtic, 3 September)
- Lowest home attendance: 2,223 (v Airdrieonians, 11 April)
- Average home league attendance: 6,724 (down 1,570)

The 1969–70 season was Kilmarnock's 68th in Scottish League Competitions.

== Squad ==
Note: Flags indicate national team as defined under FIFA eligibility rules; some limited exceptions apply. Players may hold more than one non-FIFA nationality.

No.	Pos.	Nation	Player
—	GK	SCO	Ally Hunter
—	GK	SCO	Sandy McLaughlan
—	DF	SCO	Jackie McGrory
—	DF	SCO	Billy Dickson
—	DF	SCO	Andy King
—	DF	SCO	Alan McDonald
—	DF	SCO	Hugh Strachan
—	DF	SCO	Robin Arthur
—	DF	SCO	Brian Rodman
—	MF	SCO	Tommy McLean

No.	Pos.	Nation	Player
—	MF	SCO	Frank Beattie
—	MF	SCO	John Gilmour
—	MF	SCO	George Maxwell
—	MF	SCO	Ronnie Sheed
—	FW	SCO	Jim McLean
—	FW	SCO	Eddie Morrison
—	FW	SCO	Ross Mathie
—	FW	SCO	Jim Cook
—	FW	SCO	Willie Waddell

== Scottish First Division ==
=== League table ===
Pos	Team	Pld	W	D	L	GF	GA	GD	Pts
5	Dundee United	34	16	6	12	62	64	−2	38
6	Dundee	34	15	6	13	49	44	+5	36
7	Kilmarnock	34	13	10	11	62	57	+5	36
8	Aberdeen	34	14	7	13	55	45	+10	35
9	Morton	34	13	9	12	52	52	0	35

Source: "1969-1970 First Division - SPFL Archive". SPFL.

=== Match results ===
Match Day	Date	Opponent	H/A	Score	Kilmarnock scorer(s)	Attendance
1	30 August	Motherwell	A	0–1		6,762
2	3 September	Celtic	H	2–4	Mathie 45', Morrison 85'	23,821
3	6 September	Raith Rovers	H	1–0	Mathie 60'	3,978
4	13 September	Heart of Midlothian	A	1–4	Morrison 26'	8,227
5	20 September	Ayr United	H	4–1	Cook 3', 64', Mathie 6', T.McLean 66'	10,087
6	27 September	St Mirren	A	2–0	Morrison 31', Mathie 61'	5,342
7	4 October	Partick Thistle	A	2–2	Gilmour 19', Strachan 89'	4,025
8	11 October	Dundee	H	3–0	Morrison 34', 69', Mathie 45'	4,895
9	18 October	Dunfermline Athletic	A	1–2	Baillie 65' o.g.	7,974
10	25 October	Hibernian	H	2–2	Mathie 33', Gilmour 65'	7,608
11	1 November	Clyde	A	3–2	Morrison 7', Cook 34', Mathie 40'	1,944
12	8 November	Morton	H	5–2	Dickson 38', Mathie 54', 66', T.McLean 62' pen., 82' pen.	4,141
13	15 November	Rangers	A	3–5	Morrison 7', 58', Mathie 75'	35,499
14	29 November	Aberdeen	H	0–2		5,396
15	2 December	St Johnstone	H	4–1	Mathie 22', 46', Morrison 27', Gilmour 82'	3,795
16	6 December	Dundee United	A	2–2	Mathie 2', Morrison 69'	5,639
17	13 December	Motherwell	H	2–2	T.McLean 11', Cook 53'	5,027
18	20 December	Celtic	A	1–3	Morrison 24'	31,459
19	1 January	St Mirren	H	1–1	T.McLean 50' pen.	7,587
20	3 January	Ayr United	A	2–3	Mathie 49', 59'	12,722
21	17 January	Heart of Midlothian	H	0–0		5,593
22	18 January	Raith Rovers	A	3–2	McDonald 83', Morrison 84', Mathie 88'	1,713
23	11 February	Dundee United	H	3–1	Morrison 39', Cook 62', Mathie 84'	4,647
24	25 February	Partick Thistle	H	4–2	Morrison 30', 44', 65', Mathie 48'	5,173
25	28 February	Dundee	A	0–3		7,666
26	7 March	Dunfermline Athletic	H	1–0	Mathie 2'	5,391
27	21 March	Clyde	H	2–1	T.McLean 40', Morrison 86'	3,811
28	25 March	Hibernian	A	1–2	T.McLean 21'	7,100
29	29 March	Morton	A	1–1	Mathie 49'	2,680
30	1 April	Airdrieonians	A	0–1		1,431
31	4 April	Rangers	H	2–2	J.McLean 51', T.McLean 56' pen.	11,135
32	4 April	Aberdeen	A	2–2	Mathie 23', Morrison 61'	6,155
33	11 April	Airdrieonians	H	1–0	T.McLean 35'	2,223
34	18 April	St Johnstone	A	1–1	Morrison 3'	1,954

=== Scottish League Cup ===
==== Group stage ====
Round	Date	Opponent	H/A	Score	Kilmarnock scorer(s)	Attendance
G3	9 August	Partick Thistle	A	2–0	Morrison 2', Gilmour 19'	4,915
G3	13 August	St Johnstone	H	2–3	T.McLean 22' pen., Gilmour 64'	5,603
G3	16 August	Dundee	A	0–0		9,207
G3	20 August	St Johnstone	A	1–2	J.McLean 52'	7,313
G3	23 August	Partick Thistle	H	6–0	Morrison 15', W.Waddell 27', 82', Mathie 38', 65', T.McLean 70'	3,472
G3	27 August	Dundee	H	1–0	King 44'	3,971

==== Group 3 final table ====
P	Team	Pld	W	D	L	GF	GA	GD	Pts
1	St Johnstone	6	6	0	0	22	6	12	16
2	Kilmarnock	6	3	1	2	12	5	7	7
3	Dundee	6	2	1	3	7	6	1	5
4	Partick Thistle	6	0	0	6	1	25	−24	0

=== Scottish Cup ===
Round	Date	Opponent	H/A	Score	Kilmarnock scorer(s)	Attendance
R1	24 January	Partick Thistle	H	3–0	Morrison 10', Cook 43', Mathie 58'	7,763
R2	7 February	Heart of Midlothian	H	2–0	Cook 3', Mathie 57'	14,782
QF	21 February	Motherwell	A	1–0	Mathie 69'	16,514
SF	14 March	Aberdeen	N	0–1		25,812

=== Inter-Cities Fairs Cup ===
Round	Date	Opponent	H/A	Score	Kilmarnock scorer(s)	Attendance
R1 L1	16 September	(Switzerland) FC Zürich	A	2–3	J.McLean 2', Mathie 14'	13,500
R1 L2	30 September	(Switzerland) FC Zürich	H	3–1	McGrory 42', Morrison 46' McLean 74',	9.593
R2 L1	19 November	(Bulgaria) Slavia Sofia	H	4–1	Mathie 6', 75', Cook 11', Gilmour 76'	9,535
R2 L2	26 November	(Bulgaria) Slavia Sofia	A	0–2		12,000
R3 L1	17 December	(Romania) Dinamo Bacău	H	1–1	Mathie 49'	7,749
R3 L2	13 January	(Romania) Dinamo Bacău	A	0–2		20,000

== See also ==
- List of Kilmarnock F.C. seasons
