= 1973–74 Kilmarnock F.C. season =

Kilmarnock
1973–74 season
- Manager: Walter McCrae to October 1973, Willie Fernie from October 1973
- Scottish Second Division: 2nd
- Scottish Cup: R3
- Scottish League Cup: SF
- Top goalscorer: League: Ian Fleming 33; All: Ian Fleming 35
- Highest home attendance: 5,675 (v Stirling Albion, 27 April)
- Lowest home attendance: 2,213 (v Berwick Rangers, 2 October)
- Average home league attendance: 3,639 (down 827)

The 1973–74 season was Kilmarnock's 72nd in Scottish League Competitions. They finished as runners-up in the Scottish Second Division and were promoted back to the First Division after 1 season in the 2nd tier.

== Squad ==
Note: Flags indicate national team as defined under FIFA eligibility rules; some limited exceptions apply. Players may hold more than one non-FIFA nationality.

No.	Pos.	Nation	Player
—	GK	SCO	Jim Stewart
—	GK	SCO	Alan McCulloch
—	DF	SCO	Billy Dickson
—	DF	SCO	Brian Rodman
—	DF	SCO	Jim Whyte
—	DF	SCO	Alan Robertson
—	DF	SCO	Derrick McDicken
—	DF	SCO	Andy Ferguson
—	MF	SCO	Jim McSherry
—	MF	SCO	Hugh Cameron
—	MF	SCO	John Gilmour

No.	Pos.	Nation	Player
—	MF	SCO	George Maxwell
—	MF	SCO	Ronnie Sheed
—	MF	SCO	Ian Fleming
—	MF	SCO	Iain McCulloch
—	FW	SCO	Eddie Morrison
—	FW	SCO	Jim Cook
—	FW	SCO	Phil McGovern
—	FW	SCO	Gordon Smith
—	FW	SCO	Bobby Stevenson
—	FW	SCO	Ian Kerr

== Scottish Second Division ==
=== League table ===
Pos	Team	Pld	W	D	L	GF	GA	GD	Pts	Promotion or relegation
1	Airdrieonians	36	28	4	4	102	25	+77	60	Promotion to the 1974–75 First Division
2	Kilmarnock	36	26	6	4	96	44	+52	58	Promotion to the 1974–75 First Division
3	Hamilton Academical	36	24	7	5	68	38	+30	55	
4	Queen of the South	36	20	7	9	73	41	+32	47	
5	Berwick Rangers	36	16	13	7	53	35	+18	45	

Source: "1973-1974 Second Division - SPFL Archive". SPFL.

=== Match results ===
Match Day	Date	Opponent	H/A	Score	Kilmarnock scorer(s)	Attendance
1	1 September	Clydebank	H	3–2	Morrison 14', Stevenson 30' pen., 57' pen.	2,848
2	5 September	Berwick Rangers	A	1–4	Morrison 77'	917
3	8 September	St Mirren	A	3–1	Fleming 41', 85', Cook 67'	4,768
4	15 September	Montrose	H	2–1	O’Donnell 12' o.g., Fleming 56'	2607
5	19 September	Queen of the South	A	0–1		2,463
6	29 September	Cowdenbeath	H	4–3	Sheed 23', Morrison 39', Smith 57', Maxwell 60' pen.	2,222
7	2 October	Berwick Rangers	H	2–3	Morrison 14', Gilmour 58'	2,213
8	6 October	Alloa Athletic	A	1–0	Smith 77'	2,004
9	13 October	Airdrieonians	H	4–0	Fleming 35', Morrison 70', Maxwell 74' pen., McSherry 89'	4,281
10	20 October	Queen's Park	A	2–0	Morrison 72', Fleming 89'	1,466
11	27 October	Raith Rovers	H	1–1	Maxwell 88' pen.	4,181
12	10 November	Stranraer	A	2–2	Fleming 32', Maxwell 80'	1,558
13	17 November	Forfar Athletic	H	5–1	Fleming 5', 13', Morrison 77', 78', McSherry 89'	2,730
14	21 November	Albion Rovers	A	4–3	Morrison 6', 53', Smith 12', 16'	295
15	1 December	Brechin City	H	3–1	Morrison 43', Fleming 70', 86'	2,769
16	22 December	Stirling Albion	A	1–1	Cook 80'	1,192
17	29 December	Clydebank	A	2–1	Fleming 48', Smith 86'	1,611
18	1 January	St Mirren	H	1–1	Fleming 82'	4,599
19	5 January	Montrose	A	2–0	Morrison 4', Sheed 7'	914
20	12 January	Hamilton Academical	H	3–1	Smith 4', Morrison 12', Fleming 55'	4,927
21	19 January	Cowdenbeath	A	4–2	Morrison 25', McSherry 29', Smith 34', 83'	788
22	2 February	Alloa Athletic	H	8–2	McCulloch 1', 55', Maxwell 20', Sheed 22', Fleming 30', 74', Smith 65', 87'	3,515
23	9 February	Airdrieonians	A	0–0		7,824
24	16 February	Stenhousemuir	A	1–0	Smith 85'	978
25	2 March	Raith Rovers	A	1–3	Cook 41'	2,081
26	16 March	Stranraer	H	4–1	Fleming 21', Morrison 23', 27', 56'	3,168
27	23 March	Forfar Athletic	A	5–3	Fleming 16', 43', 79', Maxwell 20' pen., McDicken 80'	697
28	30 March	Albion Rovers	H	3–1	Morrison 27', Maxwell 29', 80' pen.	3,067
29	6 April	Brechin City	A	4–0	Morrison 11', 15', Fleming 24', 60'	2,594
30	9 April	East Stirlingshire	H	4–0	Fleming 18', 79', Robertson 81', Morrison 82'	3,787
31	13 April	Stenhousemuir	H	3–1	Fleming 5', 8', Morrison 66'	3,813
32	16 April	Queen's Park	H	5–0	Morrison 26', 48', Fleming 32', 54', 77'	4,225
33	20 April	East Stirlingshire	A	3–1	Fleming 26', Maxwell 55' pen., Cook 88'	1,250
34	24 April	Queen of the South	H	1–0	Fleming 53'	4,880
35	27 April	Stirling Albion	H	2–1	Fleming 67', Morrison 87'	5,675
36	30 April	Hamilton Academical	A	2–2	Fleming 39', 61'	2,852

=== Scottish League Cup ===
==== Group stage ====
Round	Date	Opponent	H/A	Score	Kilmarnock scorer(s)	Attendance
G5	11 August	East Stirlingshire	A	2–3	Smith 27', Cameron 64'	1,060
G5	15 August	Hamilton Academical	H	0–0		3,169
G5	18 August	Queen's Park	H	2–0	Morrison 27', Smith 90'	2,591
G5	22 August	Hamilton Academical	A	4–0	McSherry 7', Smith 40', Stevenson 45', Morrison 58'	2,450
G5	25 August	Queen's Park	A	1–1	Sheed 31'	3,300
G5	29 August	East Stirlingshire	H	4–0	Morrison 6', 90', Maxwell 56', 77' pen.	2,805

==== Group 5 final table ====
P	Team	Pld	W	D	L	GF	GA	GD	Pts
1	Kilmarnock	6	3	2	1	13	4	9	8
2	East Stirlingshire	6	3	1	2	7	9	−2	7
3	Hamilton Academical	6	1	3	2	5	9	−4	5
4	Queen's Park	6	1	2	3	7	10	−3	4

==== Knockout stage ====
Round	Date	Opponent	H/A	Score	Kilmarnock scorer(s)	Attendance
R2 L1	12 September	St Johnstone	A	0–1		3,600
R2 L2	25 September	St Johnstone	H	3–1	Maxwell 6', Fleming 27', McSherry 103'	3,478
QF L1	30 October	Albion Rovers	A	0–2		2,821
QF L2	25 September	Albion Rovers	H	5–2	Robertson 3', Morrison 4', Maxwell 30' pen., Fleming 44', Cook 88'	5,287
SF	5 December	Dundee	N	0–1		4,682

=== Scottish Cup ===
Round	Date	Opponent	H/A	Score	Kilmarnock scorer(s)	Attendance
R3	26 January	Hibernian	A	2–5	Morrison 13', 19'	14,241

== See also ==
- List of Kilmarnock F.C. seasons
