= 1972–73 Kilmarnock F.C. season =

Kilmarnock
1972–73 season
- Manager: Walter McCrae
- Scottish First Division: 17th
- Scottish Cup: R4
- Scottish League Cup: GS
- Top goalscorer: League: Eddie Morrison 16; All: Eddie Morrison 22
- Highest home attendance: 11,185 (v Celtic, 7 February)
- Lowest home attendance: 2,323 (v Dundee, 27 February)
- Average home league attendance: 4,466 (down 1,227)

The 1972–73 season was Kilmarnock's 71st in Scottish League Competitions. They were relegated at the end of the season for the first time since 1947.

== Squad ==
Note: Flags indicate national team as defined under FIFA eligibility rules; some limited exceptions apply. Players may hold more than one non-FIFA nationality.

No.	Pos.	Nation	Player
—	GK	SCO	Ally Hunter
—	GK	SCO	Jim Stewart
—	DF	SCO	Jackie McGrory
—	DF	SCO	Billy Dickson
—	DF	SCO	Brian Rodman
—	DF	SCO	Alex Cairns
—	DF	SCO	Jim Whyte
—	DF	SCO	Alan Lee
—	DF	SCO	Alan Robertson
—	MF	SCO	Jim McSherry
—	MF	SCO	Hugh Cameron

No.	Pos.	Nation	Player
—	MF	SCO	John Gilmour
—	MF	SCO	George Maxwell
—	MF	SCO	Ronnie Sheed
—	MF	SCO	Ian Fleming
—	FW	SCO	Eddie Morrison
—	FW	SCO	Jim Cook
—	FW	SCO	Jim McCulloch
—	FW	SCO	Phil McGovern
—	FW	SCO	Gordon Smith
—	FW	SCO	Bobby Stevenson

== Scottish First Division ==
=== League table ===
Pos	Team	Pld	W	D	L	GF	GA	GD	Pts	Qualification or relegation
14	Falkirk	34	7	12	15	38	56	−18	26	
15	Arbroath	34	9	8	17	39	63	−24	26	
16	Dumbarton	34	6	11	17	43	72	−29	23	
17	Kilmarnock	34	7	8	19	40	71	−31	22	Relegated to 1973–74 Second Division
18	Airdrieonians	34	4	8	22	34	75	−41	16	Relegated to 1973–74 Second Division

Source: Soccerbase and League Tables

=== Match results ===
Match Day	Date	Opponent	H/A	Score	Kilmarnock scorer(s)	Attendance
1	2 September	Celtic	A	2–6	Cook 26', Morrison 66'	11,661
2	9 September	Ayr United	H	0–1		5,425
3	16 September	Motherwell	A	0–2		4,451
4	23 September	East Fife	H	1–3	Maxwell 65' pen.	2,542
5	30 September	Rangers	H	2–1	Morrison 42', 48'	10,643
6	7 October	Arbroath	A	3–3	Cook 27', 43', McCulloch 88'	2,662
7	14 October	St Johnstone	H	1–4	Maxwell 12' pen.	3,061
8	21 October	Dundee	A	0–1		5,588
9	28 October	Airdrieonians	H	3–1	Maxwell 44' pen., Morrison 65', Smith 67'	2,776
10	4 November	Hibernian	A	1–4	Morrison 4'	11,172
11	11 November	Dumbarton	H	2–2	Morrison 46', Cook 47'	3,039
12	18 November	Aberdeen	A	0–3		11,054
13	25 November	Morton	A	1–2	Morrison 57'	3,043
14	2 December	Partick Thistle	H	2–3	Morrison 15', Dickson 18'	3,490
15	9 December	Heart of Midlothian	A	0–0		6,568
16	16 December	Dundee United	H	0–1		2,536
17	23 December	Falkirk	A	2–3	Smith 59', Maxwell 63' pen.	3,114
18	1 January	Ayr United	A	1–1	Morrison 25'	8,507
19	6 January	Motherwell	H	1–0	Cameron 48'	4,083
20	13 January	East Fife	A	0–3		3,622
21	20 January	Rangers	A	0–4		14,515
22	27 January	Arbroath	H	2–0	McSherry 4', Smith 52'	2,869
23	7 February	Celtic	H	0–4		11,185
24	10 February	St Johnstone	H	2–2	Smith 29', McSherry 30'	2,124
25	27 February	Dundee	H	1–2	Fleming 72'	2,323
26	3 March	Airdrieonians	A	1–0	Morrison 56'	4,026
27	10 March	Hibernian	H	2–2	Dickson 73', Morrison 84'	6,700
28	17 March	Dumbarton	A	2–4	McSherry 43', Morrison 44'	4,141
29	24 March	Aberdeen	H	0–2		3,908
30	31 March	Morton	H	2–1	Morrison 34', Whyte 66'	2,380
31	7 April	Partick Thistle	A	1–1	McSherry 83'	5,240
32	14 April	Heart of Midlothian	H	2–1	Rodman 60', Morrison 86'	4,036
33	21 April	Dundee United	A	1–2	Morrison 38'	3,634
34	28 April	Falkirk	H	2–2	Morrison 13', Sheed 27'	5,314

=== Scottish League Cup ===
==== Group stage ====
Round	Date	Opponent	H/A	Score	Kilmarnock scorer(s)	Attendance
G4	12 August	Stenhousemuir	A	1–1	Mathie 53'	1,046
G4	16 August	Dundee United	H	2–3	Gilmour 22', Cook 43'	3,548
G4	19 August	Dunfermline Athletic	H	2–1	Morrison 15', Mathie 44'	3,066
G4	23 August	Dundee United	A	1–2	Morrison 6'	4,012
G4	26 August	Stenhousemuir	H	3–1	Morrison 14', 70', 89'	2,478
G4	30 August	Dunfermline Athletic	A	0–1		2,024

==== Group 4 final table ====
P	Team	Pld	W	D	L	GF	GA	GD	Pts
1	Dundee United	6	5	0	1	13	5	8	10
2	Stenhousemuir	6	2	2	2	11	13	−2	6
3	Kilmarnock	6	2	1	3	9	9	0	5
4	Dunfermline Athletic	6	1	1	4	6	12	−6	3

=== Scottish Cup ===
Round	Date	Opponent	H/A	Score	Kilmarnock scorer(s)	Attendance
R3	3 February	Queen of the South	H	2–1	McSherry 10', Morrison 82'	4,378
R4	26 February	Airdrieonians	H	0–1		5,828

=== Texaco Cup ===
Round	Date	Opponent	H/A	Score	Kilmarnock scorer(s)	Attendance
R1, L1	12 September	Wolverhampton Wanderers	A	1–5	Bailey ?' o.g.	8,734
R1, L2	26 September	Wolverhampton Wanderers	H	0–0		3,721

== See also ==
- List of Kilmarnock F.C. seasons
