= 1970–71 Kilmarnock F.C. season =

Kilmarnock
1970–71 season
- Manager: Walter McCrae
- Scottish First Division: 13th
- Scottish Cup: QF
- Scottish League Cup: GS
- Inter-Cities Fairs Cup: R1
- Top goalscorer: League: Tommy McLean 10; All: Tommy McLean 14
- Highest home attendance: 17,075 (v Celtic, 20 March)
- Lowest home attendance: 3,003 (v Dundee, 9 March)
- Average home league attendance: 5,933 (down 791)

The 1970–71 season was Kilmarnock’s 69th in Scottish League Competitions.

== Squad ==
Note: Flags indicate national team as defined under FIFA eligibility rules; some limited exceptions apply. Players may hold more than one non-FIFA nationality.

No.	Pos.	Nation	Player
—	GK	SCO	Ally Hunter
—	GK	SCO	Sandy McLaughlan
—	DF	SCO	Jackie McGrory
—	DF	SCO	Billy Dickson
—	DF	SCO	Andy King
—	DF	SCO	Alan McDonald
—	DF	SCO	Robin Arthur
—	DF	SCO	Brian Rodman
—	DF	SCO	Alex Cairns
—	DF	SCO	Eric Gillespie
—	DF	SCO	Davie Swan
—	DF	SCO	Jim Whyte
—	MF	SCO	Jim McSherry
—	MF	SCO	Tommy McLean

No.	Pos.	Nation	Player
—	MF	SCO	Frank Beattie
—	MF	SCO	John Gilmour
—	MF	SCO	George Maxwell
—	MF	SCO	Ronnie Sheed
—	FW	SCO	Eddie Morrison
—	FW	SCO	Ross Mathie
—	FW	SCO	Jim Cook
—	FW	SCO	Willie Waddell
—	FW	SCO	Jimmy Graham
—	FW	SCO	Walter Johnston
—	FW	SCO	John Leckie
—	FW	SCO	Jim McCulloch
—	FW	SCO	Gordon Wylie

== Scottish First Division ==
=== League table ===
Pos	Team	Pld	W	D	L	GF	GA	GD	Pts
11	Heart of Midlothian	34	13	7	14	41	40	+1	33
12	Hibernian	34	10	10	14	47	53	−6	30
13	Kilmarnock	34	10	8	16	43	67	−24	28
14	Ayr United	34	9	8	17	37	54	−17	26
15	Clyde	34	8	10	16	33	59	−26	26

Source: Soccerbase and League Tables

=== Match results ===
Match Day	Date	Opponent	H/A	Score	Kilmarnock scorer(s)	Attendance
1	29 August	Motherwell	A	1–4	Cook 75'	5,661
2	5 September	St Mirren	H	1–2	Mathie 53'	4,256
3	12 September	Ayr United	A	1–1	McLean 44'	8,488
4	19 September	Aberdeen	H	0–4		5,056
5	26 September	Cowdenbeath	A	2–1	Morrison 3', Gilmour 35'	3,148
6	3 October	Heart of Midlothian	H	3–0	McLean 10', Cook 19', Dickson 65'	5,365
7	10 October	Falkirk	A	0–3		4,018
8	17 October	Dundee United	H	2–1	McCulloch 44', Mathie 46'	3,644
9	24 October	Morton	H	2–2	Mathie 60', Cook 65'	3,743
10	31 October	Dundee	A	0–3		3,578
11	7 November	St Johnstone	H	2–4	McLean 70', Mathie 89'	3,910
12	14 November	Celtic	A	0–3		24,410
13	21 November	Hibernian	A	0–1		6,364
14	28 November	Airdrieonians	H	2–3	Graham 2', McLean 9'	3,912
15	5 December	Dunfermline Athletic	A	1–0	Gilmour 72'	4,164
16	12 December	Clyde	H	1–1	Morrison 37'	3,805
17	19 December	Rangers	A	2–4	McLean 70', Maxwell 72'	19,450
18	26 December	Motherwell	H	0–0		5,323
19	1 January	St Mirren	A	3–2	T.McLean 35' pen., 74', Mathie 57'	5,934
20	2 January	Ayr United	H	1–1	McLean 36'	15,240
21	9 January	Aberdeen	A	0–3		19,032
22	16 January	Cowdenbeath	H	2–1	Gilmour 27', Waddell 52'	4,015
23	30 January	Heart of Midlothian	A	0–2		8,823
24	6 February	Falkirk	H	3–2	McCulloch 14', Morrison 18', Rennie 87' o.g.	4,712
25	20 February	Dundee United	A	2–3	McCulloch 8', Cook 68'	3,852
26	27 February	Morton	A	0–3		2,324
27	9 March	Dundee	H	1–1	McLean 75' pen.	3,003
28	13 March	St Johnstone	A	3–2	Rennie 9' o.g., McCulloch 25', Morrison 88'	8,513
29	20 March	Celtic	H	1–4	Morrison 2'	17,075
30	27 March	Hibernian	H	4–1	McCulloch 1', Gilmour 14', McLean 16' pen., Cook 55'	4,209
31	10 April	Dunfermline Athletic	H	0–0		5,050
32	14 April	Airdrieonians	A	1–1	Cook 5'	2,064
33	17 April	Clyde	A	1–0	Waddell 74'	1,537
34	24 April	Rangers	H	1–4	McCulloch 11'	8,544

=== Scottish League Cup ===
==== Group stage ====
Round	Date	Opponent	H/A	Score	Kilmarnock scorer(s)	Attendance
G3	8 August	Ayr United	H	1–0	Mathie 89'	7,073
G3	12 August	St Mirren	A	3–1	Gilmour 6', Cook 36', Mathie 50'	4,488
G3	15 August	Dundee	A	0–2		7,644
G3	20 August	St Mirren	H	2–0	McLean 2', 85' pen.	4,931
G3	22 August	Ayr United	A	0–0		7,911
G3	26 August	Dundee	H	2–1	McLean 30' pen., Mathie 44'	3,280

==== Group 3 final table ====
P	Team	Pld	W	D	L	GF	GA	GD	Pts
1	Dundee	6	5	0	1	12	4	8	10
2	Kilmarnock	6	4	1	1	8	4	4	9
3	Ayr United	6	1	2	3	6	10	−4	4
4	St Mirren	6	0	1	5	4	12	−8	1

=== Scottish Cup ===
Round	Date	Opponent	H/A	Score	Kilmarnock scorer(s)	Attendance
R1	23 January	Queen’s Park	A	1–0	Waddell 17'	5,923
R2	13 February	Morton	A	2–1	McCulloch 45', Waddell 76'	6,840
QF	6 March	Airdrieonians	H	2–3	Dickson 60', Gilmour 80'	11,572

=== Inter-Cities Fairs Cup ===
Round	Date	Opponent	H/A	Score	Kilmarnock scorer(s)	Attendance
R1 L1	15 September	(Northern Ireland) Coleraine F.C.	A	1–1	Mathie 55'	5,000
R1 L2	29 September	(Northern Ireland) Coleraine F.C.	H	2–3	McLean 16', Morrison 22'	5,911

== See also ==
- List of Kilmarnock F.C. seasons
