= 1976–77 Kilmarnock F.C. season =

Kilmarnock
1976–77 season
- Manager: Willie Fernie
- Scottish Football League Premier Division: 10th
- Scottish Cup: R3
- Scottish League Cup: GS
- Top goalscorer: League: Ian Fallis 10; All: Ian Fallis 14
- Highest home attendance: 14,717 (v Rangers, 13 November)
- Lowest home attendance: 1,543 (v Partick Thistle, 20 April)
- Average home league attendance: 5,849 (up 1,559)

The 1976–77 season was Kilmarnock's 75th in Scottish League Competitions. They finished bottom of the table and were relegated at the end of the season.

== Squad ==
Note: Flags indicate national team as defined under FIFA eligibility rules; some limited exceptions apply. Players may hold more than one non-FIFA nationality.

No.	Pos.	Nation	Player
—	GK	SCO	Jim Stewart
—	GK	SCO	Alan McCulloch
—	DF	SCO	Alan Robertson
—	DF	SCO	Derrick McDicken
—	DF	SCO	Stuart McLean
—	DF	SCO	Paul Clarke
—	DF	SCO	Alan Ward
—	DF	SCO	Frank Welsh
—	MF	SCO	David Provan
—	MF	SCO	George Maxwell

No.	Pos.	Nation	Player
—	MF	SCO	Ronnie Sheed
—	MF	SCO	Iain McCulloch
—	MF	SCO	Chris Fleming
—	MF	SCO	Billy Murdoch
—	MF	SCO	Jim Doherty
—	MF	SCO	Iain Jardine
—	MF	SCO	Alan McLean
—	FW	SCO	Gordon Smith
—	FW	SCO	Ian Fallis
—	FW	SCO	Ricky Sharp

== Scottish Premier Division ==
=== League table ===
Pos	Team	Pld	W	D	L	GF	GA	GD	Pts	Qualification or relegation
6	Hibernian	36	8	18	10	34	35	−1	34	
7	Motherwell	36	10	12	14	57	60	−3	32	
8	Ayr United	36	11	8	17	44	68	−24	30	
9	Heart of Midlothian (R)	36	7	13	16	49	66	−17	27	Relegation to the 1977–78 Scottish First Division
10	Kilmarnock (R)	36	4	9	23	32	71	−39	17	Relegation to the 1977–78 Scottish First Division

Source: Statto
Rules for classification: 1) points; 2) goal difference; 3) number of goals scored.
(R) Relegated

=== Match results ===
Match Day	Date	Opponent	H/A	Score	Kilmarnock scorer(s)	Attendance
1	4 September	Motherwell	H	1–1	Clarke 11'	5,163
2	11 September	Rangers	A	0–0		24,800
3	18 September	Aberdeen	A	0–2		9,566
4	25 September	Celtic	H	0–4		14,615
5	2 October	Heart of Midlothian	A	2–2	McCulloch 21', McDicken 26'	9,333
6	23 October	Partick Thistle	A	1–2	Fallis 80'	4,749
7	26 October	Hibernian	H	1–1	Smith 40'	4,202
8	30 October	Ayr United	H	6–1	Sheed 12', McDicken 14', Fallis 29', 34', 53', Murdoch 89'	6,422
9	3 November	Dundee United	A	0–3		4,886
10	6 November	Motherwell	A	4–5	Fallis 5', 13', Maxwell 67', Smith 68'	4,754
11	13 November	Rangers	H	0–4		14,717
12	20 November	Aberdeen	H	1–2	Smith 42' pen.	4,212
13	27 November	Celtic	A	1–2	McCulloch 5'	20,337
14	18 December	Dundee United	H	1–0	Fallis 75'	3,519
15	27 December	Partick Thistle	H	0–0		5,018
16	1 January	Ayr United	A	1–3	Smith 33'	7,938
17	3 January	Motherwell	H	2–2	Fallis 38', Maxwell 80'	6,299
18	8 January	Rangers	A	0–3		18,189
19	22 January	Celtic	H	1–3	Fallis 28'	14,363
20	5 February	Heart of Midlothian	A	0–4		7,226
21	7 February	Aberdeen	A	0–2		8,477
22	12 February	Hibernian	H	0–1		3,397
23	15 February	Heart of Midlothian	H	2–1	Robertson 12', McDicken 87'	3,812
24	19 February	Dundee United	A	0–4		5,096
25	5 March	Partick Thistle	A	1–3	Smith 27' pen.	3,147
26	9 March	Hibernian	A	0–2		3,158
27	12 March	Ayr United	H	0–1		4,124
28	19 March	Motherwell	A	0–2		4,080
29	26 March	Rangers	H	1–0	Robertson 59'	8,037
30	2 April	Aberdeen	H	1–2	McCulloch 10'	8,037
31	9 April	Celtic	A	0–1		18,759
32	13 April	Ayr United	A	1–1	Smith 89' pen.	5,046
33	16 April	Heart of Midlothian	H	2–2	McDicken 4', Smith 45' pen.	2,471
34	20 April	Partick Thistle	H	1–3	Provan 80'	1,543
35	23 April	Hibernian	A	0–0		3,547
36	23 April	Dundee United	H	1–2	Fallis 27'	1,643

=== Scottish League Cup ===
==== Group stage ====
Round	Date	Opponent	H/A	Score	Kilmarnock scorer(s)	Attendance
G2	14 August	Aberdeen	A	0–2		11,758
G2	18 August	Ayr United	H	2–0	Provan 60', Murdoch 80'	6,908
G2	21 August	St Mirren	H	1–1	Fallis 49'	4,242
G2	25 August	Ayr United	A	1–3	McCulloch 25'	5,173
G2	28 August	St Mirren	A	0–1		3,712
G2	1 September	Aberdeen	H	2–1	Smith 40', Welsh 80'	2,536

==== Group 2 final table ====
P	Team	Pld	W	D	L	GF	GA	GD	Pts
1	Aberdeen	6	4	1	1	12	5	7	9
2	Ayr United	6	2	2	2	8	8	0	6
3	Kilmarnock	6	2	1	3	6	8	−2	5
4	St Mirren	6	1	2	3	7	12	−5	4

=== Scottish Cup ===
Round	Date	Opponent	H/A	Score	Kilmarnock scorer(s)	Attendance
R3	24 January	Motherwell	A	0–3		8,335

=== Anglo-Scottish Cup ===
Round	Date	Opponent	H/A	Score	Kilmarnock scorer(s)	Attendance
R1 L1	7 August	Motherwell	A	1–1	Smith 36'	4,706
R1 L2	11 August	Motherwell	H	4–0	Fallis 9', Clarke 33', McDicken 78', Stevens 85' o.g.	5,216
QF L1	14 September	Nottingham Forest	A	1–2	Smith 60' pen.	8,911
QF L2	28 September	Nottingham Forest	H	2–2	Fallis 43', 49'	4,503

== See also ==
- List of Kilmarnock F.C. seasons
