= 1974–75 Kilmarnock F.C. season =

Kilmarnock
1974–75 season
- Manager: Willie Fernie
- Scottish First Division: 12th
- Scottish Cup: R3
- Scottish League Cup: QF
- Top goalscorer: League: Eddie Morrison & Ian Fleming 11; All: Ian Fleming 22
- Highest home attendance: 19,609 (v Rangers, 28 September)
- Lowest home attendance: 3,426 (v Arbroath, 30 November)
- Average home league attendance: 7,071 (up 3,432)

The 1974–75 season was Kilmarnock's 73rd in Scottish League Competitions. They finished 12th and failed to qualify for the inaugural 10 team Scottish Premier League.

== Squad ==
Note: Flags indicate national team as defined under FIFA eligibility rules; some limited exceptions apply. Players may hold more than one non-FIFA nationality.

| No. | Pos. | Nation | Player |
|---|---|---|---|
| — | GK | SCO | Jim Stewart |
| — | GK | SCO | Alan McCulloch |
| — | DF | SCO | Brian Rodman |
| — | DF | SCO | Jim Whyte |
| — | DF | SCO | Alan Robertson |
| — | DF | SCO | Derrick McDicken |
| — | DF | SCO | Stuart McLean |
| — | MF | SCO | Jim McSherry |
| — | MF | SCO | David Provan |
| — | MF | SCO | George Maxwell |

| No. | Pos. | Nation | Player |
|---|---|---|---|
| — | MF | SCO | Ronnie Sheed |
| — | MF | SCO | Ian Fleming |
| — | MF | SCO | Iain McCulloch |
| — | FW | SCO | Eddie Morrison |
| — | FW | SCO | Jim Cook |
| — | FW | SCO | Gordon Smith |
| — | FW | SCO | Ian Kerr |
| — | FW | SCO | Ian Fallis |
| — | FW | SCO | Derek Morrison |

== Scottish First Division ==
=== League table ===
| Pos | Team | Pld | W | D | L | GF | GA | GD | Pts | Qualification |
|---|---|---|---|---|---|---|---|---|---|---|
| 10 | Motherwell | 34 | 14 | 5 | 15 | 52 | 57 | −5 | 33 | |
| 11 | Airdrieonians | 34 | 11 | 9 | 14 | 43 | 55 | −12 | 31 | Relegation to Scottish First Division |
| 12 | Kilmarnock | 34 | 8 | 15 | 11 | 52 | 68 | −16 | 31 | Relegation to Scottish First Division |
| 13 | Partick Thistle | 34 | 10 | 10 | 14 | 48 | 62 | −14 | 30 | Relegation to Scottish First Division |
| 14 | Dumbarton | 34 | 7 | 10 | 17 | 44 | 55 | −11 | 24 | Relegation to Scottish First Division |

Source: Soccerbase and League Tables

=== Match results ===
| Match Day | Date | Opponent | H/A | Score | Kilmarnock scorer(s) | Attendance |
|---|---|---|---|---|---|---|
| 1 | 31 August | Celtic | A | 0–5 | | 26,482 |
| 2 | 7 September | Ayr United | H | 3–0 | Sheed 51', 76', Fleming 64' | 7,279 |
| 3 | 14 September | Heart of Midlothian | A | 1–1 | Fleming 13' | 7,306 |
| 4 | 21 September | Aberdeen | H | 1–0 | McDicken 57' | 5,727 |
| 5 | 28 September | Rangers | H | 0–6 | | 19,609 |
| 6 | 5 October | St Johnstone | A | 2–2 | Sheed 30', Morrison 75' | 2,579 |
| 7 | 12 October | Dundee | H | 1–1 | Smith 36' | 4,951 |
| 8 | 19 October | Motherwell | A | 0–2 | | 3,628 |
| 9 | 2 November | Partick Thistle | A | 2–2 | Morrison 57', Sheed 62' | 3,676 |
| 10 | 9 November | Greenock Morton | A | 3–2 | Sheed 7', McDicken 27', Smith 85' | 2,155 |
| 11 | 13 November | Hibernian | H | 1–1 | McDicken 5' | 5,240 |
| 12 | 16 November | Dunfermline Athletic | H | 2–4 | Fleming 3', 42' | 5,327 |
| 13 | 23 November | Clyde | A | 2–4 | Morrison 37', 50' | 1,605 |
| 14 | 30 November | Arbroath | H | 2–2 | Sheed 66', Morrison 89' | 3,426 |
| 15 | 14 December | Airdrieonians | H | 3–3 | Fleming 8', Maxwell 22' pen., 49' | 3,931 |
| 16 | 21 December | Dundee United | A | 4–3 | Morrison 32', Maxwell 43' pen., Fleming 47', Sheed 54' | 4,415 |
| 17 | 28 December | Celtic | H | 0–1 | | 17,646 |
| 18 | 1 January | Ayr United | A | 2–3 | Smith 28', Fleming 33' | 9,968 |
| 19 | 4 January | Heart of Midlothian | H | 1–1 | Fleming 38' | 7,233 |
| 20 | 11 January | Aberdeen | A | 0–4 | | 8,462 |
| 21 | 1 February | St Johnstone | H | 1–1 | Morrison 5' | 3,938 |
| 22 | 8 February | Dundee | A | 1–4 | Sheed 6' | 4,835 |
| 23 | 15 February | Rangers | A | 3–3 | Provan 30', McDicken 45', Fallis 68' | 27,157 |
| 24 | 22 February | Motherwell | H | 3–1 | Morrison 9', 70', Maxwell 21' | 6,097 |
| 25 | 26 February | Dumbarton | A | 1–1 | Sheed 15' | 4,069 |
| 26 | 1 March | Hibernian | A | 2–0 | Morrison 44', Fallis 59' | 7,866 |
| 27 | 8 March | Partick Thistle | H | 1–1 | Maxwell 80' pen. | 6,676 |
| 28 | 15 March | Morton | H | 2–1 | Smith 37', Fleming 44' | 4,155 |
| 29 | 22 March | Dunfermline Athletic | A | 1–1 | Morrison 45' | 2,594 |
| 30 | 29 March | Clyde | H | 2–1 | Smith 68', Maxwell 83' pen. | 5,054 |
| 31 | 5 April | Arbroath | A | 0–0 | | 1,439 |
| 32 | 12 April | Dumbarton | H | 1–2 | Fleming 85' | 5,489 |
| 33 | 19 April | Airdrieonians | A | 2–2 | Fallis 22', McLean 33' | 3,827 |
| 34 | 28 April | Dundee United | H | 2–4 | Fallis 30', Fleming 42' | 7,589 |

=== Scottish League Cup ===
==== Group stage ====
| Round | Date | Opponent | H/A | Score | Kilmarnock scorer(s) | Attendance |
|---|---|---|---|---|---|---|
| G6 | 10 August | Montrose | H | 2–0 | Fleming 40', McCulloch 65' | 3,264 |
| G6 | 14 August | Stranraer | A | 5–0 | Fleming 1', 65', 77', Smith 49', 52' | 1,338 |
| G6 | 17 August | Queen's Park | A | 2–0 | Fleming 25', 31' | 3,066 |
| G6 | 21 August | Stranraer | H | 2–0 | Maxwell 12' pen., Morrison 27' | 3,358 |
| G6 | 24 August | Queen's Park | H | 6–0 | Rodman 14', Fleming 24', 61', Morrison 35', Smith 50', Cook 80' | 3,300 |
| G6 | 28 August | Montrose | A | 1–1 | Fleming 30' | 1,179 |

==== Group 6 final table ====
| P | Team | Pld | W | D | L | GF | GA | GD | Pts |
|---|---|---|---|---|---|---|---|---|---|
| 1 | Kilmarnock | 6 | 5 | 1 | 0 | 18 | 1 | 17 | 11 |
| 2 | Montrose | 6 | 3 | 2 | 1 | 10 | 7 | 3 | 8 |
| 3 | Queen's Park | 6 | 0 | 3 | 3 | 2 | 11 | −9 | 3 |
| 4 | Stranraer | 6 | 0 | 2 | 4 | 2 | 13 | −11 | 2 |

==== Knockout stage ====
| Round | Date | Opponent | H/A | Score | Hibernian Scorer(s) | Attendance |
|---|---|---|---|---|---|---|
| QF L1 | 11 September | Kilmarnock | H | 3–3 | Fleming 20', 24', Morrison 55' | 10.022 |
| QF L2 | 25 September | Kilmarnock | A | 1–4 | Morrison 8' | 15,694 |

=== Scottish Cup ===
| Round | Date | Opponent | H/A | Score | Kilmarnock scorer(s) | Attendance |
|---|---|---|---|---|---|---|
| R3 | 29 January | Heart of Midlothian | A | 0–2 | | 21,054 |

=== Drybrough Cup ===
| Round | Date | Opponent | H/A | Score | Kilmarnock scorer(s) | Attendance |
|---|---|---|---|---|---|---|
| QF | 27 July | Hibernian | A | 1–2 | Fallis 86' | 13,272 |

== See also ==
- List of Kilmarnock F.C. seasons
