= 1975–76 Kilmarnock F.C. season =

Kilmarnock
1975–76 season
- Manager: Willie Fernie
- Scottish Second Division: 2nd
- Scottish Cup: QF
- Scottish League Cup: GS
- Top goalscorer: League: Ian Fallis 10; All: Ian Fallis 12
- Highest home attendance: 6,375 (v Partick Thistle, 13 September)
- Lowest home attendance: 3,577 (v St Mirren, 4 October)
- Average home league attendance: 4,290 (down 2,781)

The 1975–76 season was Kilmarnock's 74th in Scottish League Competitions. They finished runners up in the Scottish First Division and were promoted to the Premier Division.

== Squad ==
Note: Flags indicate national team as defined under FIFA eligibility rules; some limited exceptions apply. Players may hold more than one non-FIFA nationality.

No.	Pos.	Nation	Player
—	GK	SCO	Jim Stewart
—	GK	SCO	Alan McCulloch
—	DF	SCO	Brian Rodman
—	DF	SCO	Alan Robertson
—	DF	SCO	Derrick McDicken
—	DF	SCO	Stuart McLean
—	DF	SCO	Paul Clarke
—	MF	SCO	David Provan
—	MF	SCO	George Maxwell
—	MF	SCO	Ronnie Sheed
—	MF	SCO	Ian Fleming

No.	Pos.	Nation	Player
—	MF	SCO	Iain McCulloch
—	MF	SCO	Chris Fleming
—	MF	SCO	Billy Murdoch
—	FW	SCO	Eddie Morrison
—	FW	SCO	Gordon Smith
—	FW	SCO	Ian Fallis
—	FW	SCO	Derek Morrison
—	FW	SCO	Jim Jenkins
—	FW	SCO	Ricky Sharp
—	FW	SCO	Billy Wilson

== Scottish First Division ==
=== League table ===
Pos	Team	Pld	W	D	L	GF	GA	GD	Pts	Promotion or relegation
1	Partick Thistle (C, P)	26	17	7	2	47	19	+28	41	Promotion to the Premier Division
2	Kilmarnock (P)	26	16	3	7	44	29	+15	35	Promotion to the Premier Division
3	Montrose	26	12	6	8	53	43	+10	30	
4	Dumbarton	26	12	4	10	53	46	+7	28	
5	Arbroath	26	11	4	11	41	39	+2	26	

Source: RSSSF and statto
Rules for classification: 1) points; 2) goal difference; 3) number of goals scored.
(C) Champions; (P) Promoted

=== Match results ===
Match Day	Date	Opponent	H/A	Score	Kilmarnock scorer(s)	Attendance
1	30 August	Hamilton Academical	H	4–2	Provan 28', Smith 30' pen., Fallis 33', Morrison 38',	3,917
2	6 September	Airdrieonians	A	4–3	Morrison 11', 14', Fallis 47', Smith 65'	3,683
3	13 September	Partick Thistle	H	0–1		6,375
4	20 September	East Fife	A	4–2	Fallis 6', Smith 45' pen., 89', Fleming 83'	2,607
5	27 September	Clyde	H	3–0	Fleming 36', 63', Morrison 70'	3,610
6	4 October	St Mirren	H	3–1	Morrison 15', 45', McLean 36'	3,577
7	11 October	Montrose	A	0–2		1,724
8	18 October	Arbroath	H	2–1	Smith 1', Fallis 71'	3,801
9	25 October	Morton	A	3–1	Fleming 33', 75', Smith 44' pen.	2,137
10	1 November	Falkirk	A	1–0	Smith 84'	3,862
11	8 November	Queen of the South	H	2–0	Fallis 55', Provan 58'	4,345
12	15 November	Dunfermline Athletic	A	0–1		2,673
13	22 November	Dumbarton	H	1–0	Fallis 14'	2,730
14	29 November	Clyde	A	2–0	McDicken 2', Fallis 49'	2,662
15	6 December	St Mirren	A	0–0		5,800
16	13 December	Montrose	H	1–1	McLean 77'	3,992
17	20 December	Arbroath	A	0–2		1,838
18	27 December	Greenock Morton	H	3–2	Morrison 7', Fallis 21' Smith 33'	4,344
19	1 January	Airdrieonians	H	2–1	Provan 46', Smith 62'	5,030
20	3 January	Partick Thistle	A	0–2		11,507
21	10 January	Dunfermline Athletic	H	4–0	Adair 15' o.g., Fallis 20', Scott 35' o.g., Sheed 85'	3,831
22	17 January	Dumbarton	A	0–3		2,611
23	31 January	East Fife	H	2–1	Clarke 32', McCulloch 62'	4,003
24	7 February	Hamilton Academical	A	1–1	Rodman 84'	3,000
25	21 February	Falkirk	H	1–0	Fallis 6'	3,773
26	28 February	Queen of the South	A	1–2	Rodman 49'	4,557

=== Scottish League Cup ===
==== Group stage ====
Round	Date	Opponent	H/A	Score	Kilmarnock scorer(s)	Attendance
G4	9 August	Partick Thistle	H	1–3	Sheed 38'	4,724
G4	13 August	St Johnstone	A	1–2	Fleming 28'	2,293
G4	16 August	Dundee United	A	0–2		4,050
G4	20 August	St Johnstone	H	1–0	McCulloch 58'	2,383
G4	23 August	Dundee United	H	1–0	Fallis 69'	2,795
G4	27 August	Partick Thistle	A	1–2	Morrison 48'	5,211

==== Group 4 final table ====
P	Team	Pld	W	D	L	GF	GA	GD	Pts
1	Partick Thistle	6	6	0	0	17	6	11	12
2	Dundee United	6	3	0	3	8	8	0	6
3	Kilmarnock	6	2	0	4	5	9	−4	4
4	St Johnstone	6	1	0	5	6	13	−7	2

=== Scottish Cup ===
Round	Date	Opponent	H/A	Score	Kilmarnock scorer(s)	Attendance
R3	24 January	Stenhousemuir	A	1–1	Sheed 12'	1,870
R3 R	28 January	Stenhousemuir	H	1–0	Smith 72'	4,926
R4	14 February	Falkirk	H	3–1	McDicken 32', 69', Holt o.g.(83)	6,454
QF	14 February	Dumbarton	A	1–2	Fallis 64'	7,796

=== Spring Cup ===
==== Group stage ====
Round	Date	Opponent	H/A	Score	Kilmarnock scorer(s)	Attendance
G2	10 March	Berwick Rangers	A	0–0		345
G2	13 March	Alloa Athletic	H	0–0		2,568
G2	20 March	Falkirk	H	0–1		2,072
G2	27 March	Alloa Athletic	A	2–2	Maxwell 10', C.Fleming 50'	928
G2	3 April	Berwick Rangers	H	3–1	Smith 12', Murdoch 29', 74'	1,445
G2	10 April	Falkirk	A	0–2		2,257

== See also ==
- List of Kilmarnock F.C. seasons
