= 1971–72 Kilmarnock F.C. season =

Kilmarnock
1971–72 season
- Manager: Walter McCrae
- Scottish First Division: 11th
- Scottish Cup: SF
- Scottish League Cup: GS
- Top goalscorer: League: Ross Mathie 15; All: Ross Mathie 18
- Highest home attendance: 14,707 (v Rangers, 4 March)
- Lowest home attendance: 2,625 (v Dundee, 22 April)
- Average home league attendance: 5,693 (down 240)

The 1971–72 season was Kilmarnock's 70th in Scottish League Competitions.

== Squad ==
Note: Flags indicate national team as defined under FIFA eligibility rules; some limited exceptions apply. Players may hold more than one non-FIFA nationality.

No.	Pos.	Nation	Player
—	GK	SCO	Ally Hunter
—	DF	SCO	Jackie McGrory
—	DF	SCO	Billy Dickson
—	DF	SCO	Andy King
—	DF	SCO	Alan McDonald
—	DF	SCO	Brian Rodman
—	DF	SCO	Alex Cairns
—	DF	SCO	Jim Whyte
—	DF	SCO	Alan Lee
—	MF	SCO	Jim McSherry

No.	Pos.	Nation	Player
—	MF	SCO	Frank Beattie
—	MF	SCO	John Gilmour
—	MF	SCO	George Maxwell
—	MF	SCO	Ronnie Sheed
—	MF	SCO	Ian Fleming
—	MF	SCO	Jim Fleming
—	FW	SCO	Eddie Morrison
—	FW	SCO	Ross Mathie
—	FW	SCO	Jim Cook
—	FW	SCO	Jim McCulloch

== Scottish First Division ==
=== League table ===
Pos	Team	Pld	W	D	L	GF	GA	GD	Pts
9	Dundee United	34	12	7	15	55	70	−15	31
10	Motherwell	34	11	7	16	49	69	−20	29
11	Kilmarnock	34	11	6	17	49	64	−15	28
12	Ayr United	34	9	10	15	40	58	−18	28
13	Morton	34	10	7	17	46	52	−6	27

Source: Soccerbase and League Tables

=== Match results ===
Match Day	Date	Opponent	H/A	Score	Kilmarnock scorer(s)	Attendance
1	4 September	Falkirk	A	1–3	Gilmour 85'	5,897
2	11 September	Ayr United	H	1–2	Cook 28'	7,774
3	18 September	Motherwell	A	0–3		3,774
4	25 September	Dundee United	H	2–0	Cook 28', McSherry 89'	3,012
5	2 October	Partick Thistle	A	2–2	Cook 2', Maxwell 86' pen.	7,491
6	9 October	Aberdeen	H	0–3		5,963
7	16 October	East Fife	A	0–2		3,495
8	23 October	Heart of Midlothian	H	2–2	Mathie 15', Morrison 50'	25,442
9	30 October	Rangers	A	1–3	Mathie 3'	3,743
10	6 November	Clyde	H	2–1	Maxwell 53', Mathie 60'	3,714
11	13 November	Dunfermline Athletic	A	1–0	Morrison 79'	4,344
12	20 November	Airdrieonians	H	5–2	Mathie 40', 68', Morrison 53', Maxwell 58', Cook 65'	3,095
13	27 November	Hibernian	A	2–3	Mathie 24', Maxwell 34' pen.	7,950
14	4 December	Celtic	A	1–5	Mathie 57'	26,824
15	11 December	St Johnstone	H	2–0	Cook 14', Maxwell 87' pen.	3,634
16	18 December	Dundee	A	0–2		4,646
17	25 December	Morton	H	4–2	Gilmour 14', Mathie 23', Cook 52', 87'	4,093
18	1 January	Falkirk	H	2–0	Cook 67', Mathie 74'	5,860
19	3 January	Ayr United	A	0–0		15,265
20	8 January	Motherwell	H	1–0	Mathie 64'	5,017
21	15 January	Dundee United	A	2–1	Mathie 7', Morrison 56'	3,255
22	22 January	Partick Thistle	H	1–4	Mathie 14'	7,056
23	29 January	Aberdeen	A	2–4	Fleming 35', Cook 64'	13,823
24	12 February	East Fife	H	2–3	Maxwell 6', 15' pen.	3,414
25	19 February	Heart of Midlothian	A	1–2	Morrison 37'	8,503
26	4 March	Rangers	H	1–2	Mathie 55'	14,707
27	11 March	Clyde	A	3–0	Morrison 7', 83', Mathie 26'	1,987
28	21 March	Dunfermline Athletic	H	0–0		3,944
29	25 March	Airdrieonians	A	4–0	Morrison 24', Cook 45', Mathie 75', Gilmour 85'	4,065
30	3 April	Hibernian	H	1–1	Gordon 73' o.g.	6,118
31	8 April	Celtic	H	1–3	Morrison 50'	12,620
32	15 April	St Johnstone	A	1–5	Maxwell 55' pen.	2,290
33	22 April	Dundee	H	0–3		2,625
34	29 April	Morton	A	1–1	Morrison 50'	2,692

=== Scottish League Cup ===
==== Group stage ====
Round	Date	Opponent	H/A	Score	Kilmarnock scorer(s)	Attendance
G1	14 August	Dundee United	A	0–1		6,223
G1	18 August	Motherwell	H	2–1	Morrison 6', McCulloch 82'	5,138
G1	21 August	Hibernian	A	1–3	Beattie 81'	12,515
G1	25 August	Motherwell	A	0–2		3,284
G1	28 August	Dundee United	H	4–2	Gilmour 11', McCulloch 17', McSherry 60', 63'	3,053
G1	1 September	Hibernian	H	0–0		4,168

==== Group 1 final table ====
P	Team	Pld	W	D	L	GF	GA	GD	Pts
1	Hibernian	6	5	1	0	14	3	11	11
2	Kilmarnock	6	2	1	3	7	9	−2	5
3	Dundee United	6	2	1	3	9	13	−4	5
4	Motherwell	6	1	1	4	7	12	−5	3

=== Scottish Cup ===
Round	Date	Opponent	H/A	Score	Kilmarnock scorer(s)	Attendance
R3	5 February	Alloa Athletic	H	5–1	Mathie 7', 24', Maxwell 41', Morrison 70', Cook 83'	4,415
R2	26 February	Elgin City	A	4–1	Gerrard 43' o.g., Maxwell 44', Mathie 65', Cook 78'	6,840
QF	18 March	Raith Rovers	A	3–1	Cook 35', Maxwell 54', Morrison 79'	10,815
SF	12 April	Celtic	N	1–3	Cook 47'	48,398

== See also ==
- List of Kilmarnock F.C. seasons
