= 1977–78 Kilmarnock F.C. season =

Kilmarnock
1977–78 season
- Manager: Willie Fernie to October 1977 Davie Sneddon from October 1977
- Scottish First Division: 6th
- Scottish Cup: QF
- Scottish League Cup: R2
- Top goalscorer: League: Donnie McDowell 13; All: Donnie McDowell 15
- Highest home attendance: 5,154 (v Queen of the South, 2 January)
- Lowest home attendance: 1,328 (v East Fife, 29 April)
- Average home league attendance: 2,862 (down 2,987)

The 1977–78 season was Kilmarnock's 76th in Scottish League Competitions.

== Squad ==
Note: Flags indicate national team as defined under FIFA eligibility rules; some limited exceptions apply. Players may hold more than one non-FIFA nationality.

No.	Pos.	Nation	Player
—	GK	SCO	Jim Stewart
—	GK	SCO	Alan McCulloch
—	DF	SCO	Alan Robertson
—	DF	SCO	Derrick McDicken
—	DF	SCO	Stuart McLean
—	DF	SCO	Paul Clarke
—	DF	SCO	Frank Welsh
—	DF	SCO	Ian Baird
—	DF	SCO	David Hynds
—	DF	ENG	Ken Armstrong
—	MF	SCO	David Provan
—	MF	SCO	George Maxwell

No.	Pos.	Nation	Player
—	MF	SCO	Iain McCulloch
—	MF	SCO	Billy Murdoch
—	MF	SCO	Jim Doherty
—	MF	SCO	Iain Jardine
—	MF	SCO	Hugh Arkinson
—	MF	SCO	Eddie Gray
—	MF	SCO	Jackie McGillivray
—	FW	SCO	Gordon Smith
—	FW	SCO	Ian Fallis
—	FW	SCO	Colin Stein
—	FW	SCO	Donny MacDowell

== Scottish First Division ==
=== League table ===
Pos	Team	Pld	W	D	L	GF	GA	GD	Pts
4	Dumbarton	39	16	17	6	65	48	+17	49
5	Stirling Albion	39	15	12	12	60	52	+8	42
6	Kilmarnock	39	14	12	13	52	46	+6	40
7	Hamilton Academical	39	12	12	15	54	56	−2	36
8	St Johnstone	39	15	6	18	52	64	−12	36

Source: RSSSF and statto
Rules for classification: 1) points; 2) goal difference; 3) number of goals scored.

=== Match results ===
Match Day	Date	Opponent	H/A	Score	Kilmarnock scorer(s)	Attendance
1	13 August	Greenock Morton	H	0–3		3,642
2	20 August	Stirling Albion	A	1–2	Murdoch 19'	2,100
3	27 August	Heart of Midlothian	H	1–1	McDowell 44'	5,003
4	10 September	Queen of the South	A	0–1		2,563
5	14 September	Hamilton Academical	A	1–2	Arkison 88'	1,748
6	17 September	Arbroath	H	3–0	McGilivray 13', McDowell 60', 86'	2,195
7	24 September	Airdrieonians	H	0–0		2,563
8	28 September	Montrose	A	0–0		989
9	1 October	Dundee	A	1–2	McCulloch 4'	4,719
10	8 October	Dumbarton	H	2–2	McCulloch 4', Stein 50'	3,186
11	15 October	Alloa Athletic	A	2–1	McCulloch 64'. Murdoch 89'	1,382
12	19 October	St Johnstone	H	0–1		1,905
13	22 October	Greenock Morton	A	2–0	Maxwell 30', McDowell 53'	4,256
14	29 October	Stirling Albion	H	2–3	Stein 41', Maxwell 78' pen.	2,896
15	5 November	Heart of Midlothian	A	2–1	McDowell 67', 83'	7,703
16	12 November	Queen of the South	H	1–1	Provan 44'	2,494
17	19 November	Arbroath	A	2–2	McDowell 20', Maxwell 70'	1,192
18	26 November	Airdrieonians	A	2–1	Stein 8', Provan 55'	1,636
19	3 December	Dundee	H	1–0	McDowell 24'	3,629
20	10 December	Dumbarton	A	2–2	McDowell 40', Maxwell 70'	2,174
21	17 December	Alloa Athletic	H	3–1	Stein 25', 64', McDowell 59'	2,975
22	24 December	East Fife	A	3–2	Stein 2', Maxwell 25', Robertson 30'	1,391
23	31 December	Heart of Midlothian	A	0–3		13,063
24	2 January	Queen of the South	H	2–0	Maxwell 43' pen., Stein 80'	5,154
25	7 January	Stirling Albion	A	0–0		2,137
26	14 January	Hamilton Academical	H	1–1	McDowell 30'	3,548
27	21 January	Airdrieonians	H	1–1	Stein 64'	3,370
28	11 February	Dumbarton	H	0–1		3,641
29	25 February	Alloa Athletic	H	4–0	Doherty 9', Maxwell 65', McDowell 75', Provan 81'	2,005
30	4 March	Greenock Morton	A	0–2		4,036
31	15 March	Montrose	H	5–1	McCulloch 22', 47', 81', Jardine 62', McDowell 63'	1,399
32	18 March	St Johnstone	A	0–2		1,584
33	22 March	Dundee	A	2–5	Maxwell 70', McCulloch 89'	5,295
34	25 March	St Johnstone	H	2–0	McCulloch 21', McDowell 55'	1,997
35	1 April	Arbroath	A	0–1		921
36	8 April	East Fife	A	0–0		741
37	15 April	Montrose	H	1–0	Maxwell 78' pen.	1,337
38	22 April	Hamilton Academical	A	3–1	Doherty 29', 68', Jardine 80'	1,337
39	29 April	East Fife	H	0–0		1,328

== Scottish League Cup ==
Round	Date	Opponent	H/A	Score	Kilmarnock scorer(s)	Attendance
R2 L1	31 August	St Mirren	H	0–0		5,119
R2 L2	3 September	St Mirren	A	1–2	Fallis 46'	9,458

== Scottish Cup ==
Round	Date	Opponent	H/A	Score	Kilmarnock scorer(s)	Attendance
R3	6 February	St Mirren	A	2–1	Maxwell 17' pen., McDowell 68'	10,010
R4	27 February	Celtic	A	1–1	McDowell 30'	16,000
R4R	27 February	Celtic	H	1–0	McDicken 83'	14,137
QF	11 March	Rangers	A	1–4	McCulloch 82'	28,000

== See also ==
- List of Kilmarnock F.C. seasons
