= 1982–83 Kilmarnock F.C. season =

Kilmarnock
1982–83 season
- Chairman: Tom Lauchlan
- Manager: Jim Clunie
- Scottish Premier Division: 10th
- Scottish Cup: R3
- Scottish League Cup: QF
- Top goalscorer: League: Brian Gallacher 9 All: Brian Gallacher 10
- Highest home attendance: 9,194 (v Rangers, 20 November)
- Lowest home attendance: 1,049 (v St Mirren, 27 April)
- Average home league attendance: 3,462 (up 819)

The 1982–83 season was Kilmarnock's 81st in Scottish League Competitions. They finished bottom of the table and were relegated at the end of the season to the First Division. They would not return to the top league for 10 years.

The season would go down as one of the worst in the club's history. They recorded just 3 wins in the league which is the lowest in the club's history and the joint worst goals against. 91 goals were conceded during the campaign. 17 of these were conceded against champions Dundee United and runners-up Celtic scored 15 against the club over the course of the season. However, they did come close to beating United, losing a late penalty equaliser in the first match between the clubs and they were narrowly defeated by Celtic the following week conceding 2 goals in the last 10 minutes.

Perhaps the most embarrassing result was the 8–1 hammering at the hands of Hibernian who notched only 27 goals in their other 35 league games.

There was further humiliation in the quarter final of the Scottish League Cup. Opponents Rangers triumphed 12–1 on aggregate in the two legged tie.

Off the field, the club made a financial loss of £191,919 for the year to 31 July 1982. Club chairman Tom Lauchlan stated at the club's Annual General Meeting in December that the future of the club "lies squarely with the people of the town". No mention was made of any positive action taken by the board of directors turn the club's financial situation around.

== Scottish Premier Division ==
=== League table ===
Pos	Team	Pld	W	D	L	GF	GA	GD	Pts	Qualification or relegation
6	Dundee	36	9	11	16	42	53	−11	29	
7	Hibernian	36	7	15	14	35	51	−16	29	
8	Motherwell	36	11	5	20	39	73	−34	27	
9	Morton (R)	36	6	8	22	36	81	−45	20	Relegation to the 1983–84 Scottish First Division
10	Kilmarnock (R)	36	3	11	22	28	91	−63	17	Relegation to the 1983–84 Scottish First Division

Source: Statto
Rules for classification: 1) points; 2) goal difference; 3) number of goals scored.
(R) Relegated

=== Match results ===
Match Day	Date	Opponent	H/A	Score	Kilmarnock scorer(s)	Attendance
1	4 September	Greenock Morton	A	0–0		2,349
2	11 September	Hibernian	H	1–1	Clarke 65'	2,800
3	18 September	Rangers	A	0–5		17,350
4	25 September	Dundee	H	0–0		2,105
5	2 October	St Mirren	A	2–3	McLean 21' pen., Mauchlen 28'	3,568
6	9 October	Dundee United	H	1–1	Gallacher 28'	2,446
7	16 October	Celtic	A	1–2	Clarke 52'	11,063
8	23 October	Aberdeen	H	0–2		3,402
9	30 October	Motherwell	A	1–4	McLean 42' pen.	3,016
10	6 November	Greenock Morton	H	3–1	J.Clark 23', Gallacher 55', Bourke 78'	1,854
11	13 November	Hibernian	A	2–2	Bryson 14', McDicken 75'	4,182
12	20 November	Rangers	H	0–0		9,194
13	27 November	Dundee	A	2–5	J.Clark 83', MacLeod 85'	4,311
14	4 December	St Mirren	H	2–2	Clarke 19', 68'	2,209
15	11 December	Dundee United	H	0–7		7,259
16	18 December	Celtic	H	0–4		9,024
17	27 December	Aberdeen	A	0–2		14,411
18	1 January	Motherwell	H	0–2		3,314
19	3 January	Greenock Morton	A	0–3		2,015
20	8 January	Hibernian	H	0–2		2,142
21	15 January	Rangers	A	1–1	McGivern 66'	11,223
22	22 January	Dundee	H	2–0	Gallacher 2', R.Clark 52' pen.	1,891
23	5 February	St Mirren	A	0–2		3,303
24	12 February	Dundee United	H	0–5		1,834
25	26 February	Celtic	H	0–4		10,691
26	5 March	Aberdeen	H	1–2	Gallacher 64'	2,349
27	12 March	Motherwell	A	1–3	McGivern 62'	2,895
28	19 March	Greenock Morton	H	4–0	McGivern 5', Clarke 44', Gallacher 48', 82'	1,203
29	26 March	Rangers	H	0–1		6,648
30	2 April	Hibernian	A	1–8	Gallacher 12'	4,065
31	9 April	Dundee	A	0–0		3,376
32	23 April	Dundee United	A	0–4		7,516
33	27 April	St Mirren	H	2–2	Gallacher 68', 86'	1,049
34	30 April	Celtic	H	0–5		7,560
35	7 May	Aberdeen	A	0–5		12,002
36	14 May	Motherwell	H	1–1	Simpson 33'	1,203

== Scottish League Cup ==
=== Group stage ===
Round	Date	Opponent	H/A	Score	Kilmarnock scorer(s)	Attendance
G8	14 August	Berwick Rangers	H	4–0	McCann 9' o.g., McLean 11' pen., Clarke 60', Mauchlen 72'	1,517
G8	18 August	Hamilton Academical	A	0–0		1,472
G8	21 August	Queen's Park	A	2–0	McLean 54' pen., McGivern 89'	1,005
G8	25 August	Hamilton Academical	H	1–0	Bourke 57'	1,582
G8	28 August	Berwick Rangers	A	1–2	McLean 77' pen.	672
G8	1 September	Queen's Park	H	5–1	Bourke 33', 51', McLean 60', Gallacher 65', Mauchlen 71'	1,200

=== Group 8 final table ===
P	Team	Pld	W	D	L	GF	GA	GD	Pts
1	Kilmarnock	6	4	1	1	13	3	10	9
2	Berwick Rangers	6	3	0	3	5	8	−3	6
3	Queen's Park	6	2	1	3	6	11	−5	5
4	Hamilton Academical	6	1	2	3	3	5	−2	4

=== Knockout stage ===
Round	Date	Opponent	H/A	Score	Kilmarnock scorer(s)	Attendance
R2 L1	6 September	Cowdenbeath	H	1–0	McLean 9' pen.	1,091
R2 L2	8 September	Cowdenbeath	A	0–1(AET, won 4–3 on pens)		686
QF L1	22 September	Rangers	H	1–6	McLean 51'	7,903
QF L2	25 September	Rangers	A	0–6		5,342

== Scottish Cup ==
Round	Date	Opponent	H/A	Score	Kilmarnock scorer(s)	Attendance
R3	29 January	Partick Thistle	A	1–1	Bryson 75'	4,398
R3,1R	2 February	Partick Thistle	H	0–0(AET)		3,884
R3,2R	7 February	Partick Thistle	A	2–2(AET)	Gallacher 50', McGivern 91'	4,809
R3,3R	9 February	Partick Thistle	H	0–1		3,745

== See also ==
- List of Kilmarnock F.C. seasons
