= 1984–85 Kilmarnock F.C. season =

Kilmarnock
1984–85 season
- Chairman: Tom Lauchlan until September 1984, Bob Lauchlan
- Manager: Jim Clunie until September 1984 Eddie Morrison from October 1984
- Scottish First Division: 12th
- Scottish Cup: 3R
- Scottish League Cup: 3R
- Top goalscorer: League: Blair Millar 12; All: Blair Millar 12
- Highest home attendance: 2,042 (v Motherwell, 29 December)
- Lowest home attendance: 805 (v Hamilton Academical, 22 September)
- Average home league attendance: 1,351 (down 8)

The 1984–85 season was Kilmarnock's 83rd in Scottish League Competitions. Manager Jim Clunie resigned in September following a poor start to the season. Only 1 win was recorded out of the first 8 matches with 5 goals scored and 20 conceded.

Legendary former striker Eddie Morrison was announced as his replacement the following month. The club received 32 applications for the job including former Partick Thistle manager Bertie Auld and former Motherwell and Hibernian striker Pat Quinn.

Results improved immediately with 3 wins in his first 3 matches as manager. However. a poor sequence of results after Christmas saw the club in the relegation zone with only 1 win recorded in 11 matches. This period also included a humiliating 3–0 Scottish Cup defeat at the hands of Highland League side Inverness Thistle.

5 wins in the last 8 matches meant that the club avoided relegation by 2 points.

== Scottish First Division ==
=== League table ===
Pos	Team	Pld	W	D	L	GF	GA	GD	Pts	Promotion or relegation
10	East Fife	39	12	12	15	55	56	−1	36	
11	Partick Thistle	39	13	9	17	50	55	−5	35	
12	Kilmarnock	39	12	10	17	42	61	−19	34	
13	Meadowbank Thistle (R)	39	11	10	18	50	66	−16	32	Relegation to the Second Division
14	St Johnstone (R)	39	10	5	24	51	79	−28	25	Relegation to the Second Division

Source: RSSSF and statto
Rules for classification: 1) points; 2) goal difference; 3) number of goals scored.
(R) Relegated

=== Match results ===
Match Day	Date	Opponent	H/A	Score	Kilmarnock scorer(s)	Attendance
1	11 August	Motherwell	A	0–2		2,384
2	18 August	Ayr United	H	0–0		2,013
3	25 August	Clyde	A	1–4	Cuthbertson 81'	749
4	1 September	Brechin City	H	1–1	McGivern 73'	855
5	8 September	Forfar Athletic	H	2–1	McEachran 59', McKinna 75'	809
6	15 September	Clydebank	A	0–5		837
7	22 September	Hamilton Academical	H	1–2	Bryson 52'	805
8	29 September	Airdrieonians	H	0–5		1,115
9	6 October	Meadowbank Thistle	A	0–4		419
10	13 October	Falkirk	H	3–1	Robertson 46', Bryson 69', McKinna 73'	1,210
11	20 October	East Fife	A	1–0	Cuthbertson 65'	1,006
12	27 October	St Johnstone	A	1–0	Clarke 54'	1,513
13	3 November	Partick Thistle	H	0–0		1,834
14	10 November	Forfar Athletic	A	1–4	McLean 71' pen.	1,060
15	17 November	Clydebank	H	1–1	Clarke 89'	1,184
16	24 November	Hamilton Academical	A	0–1		889
17	1 December	Airdrieonians	A	1–2	McGivern 84'	1,483
18	8 December	Meadowbank Thistle	H	2–1	McLean 58' pen., Millar 86'	847
19	15 December	Brechin City	A	2–3	McGivern 12', 83'	668
20	22 December	Clyde	H	2–0	Millar 17', 43'	1,303
21	29 December	Motherwell	H	0–0		2,042
22	2 January	Ayr United	A	0–1		4,036
23	5 January	East Fife	H	1–1	McKinna 65'	1,296
24	14 January	St Johnstone	H	3–2	McKinna 27', 35', Millar 56'	1,451
25	2 February	Partick Thistle	A	0–1		1,776
26	23 February	Motherwell	A	2–2	Millar 37', McKinna 83'	2288
27	26 February	Clydebank	H	0–0		1,336
28	2 March	Brechin City	A	1–2	Millar 77'	621
29	9 March	Hamilton Academical	H	1–1	Millar 18'	1,225
30	13 March	Falkirk	A	2–3	Cuthbertson 61', Millar 78'	1,532
31	16 March	Meadowbank Thistle	A	1–2	McGivern 25'	492
32	23 March	Forfar Athletic	H	1–0	Millar 82'	1,082
33	30 March	Ayr United	A	0–0		2,404
34	6 April	Falkirk	H	0–3		1,632
35	13 April	Partick Thistle	H	2–0	McKinna 22', Cuthbertson 32'	1,803
36	20 April	East Fife	A	2–0	Millar 1', 38'	875
37	27 April	St Johnstone	A	4–2	Millar 19', Cormack 44', Cuthbertson 45', Pelosi 86'	781
38	4 May	Clyde	H	2–0	Cuthbertson 52', Clarke 76'	1,692
39	12 May	Airdrieonians	H	1–4	Bryson 29'	1,493

== Scottish League Cup ==
Round	Date	Opponent	H/A	Score	Kilmarnock scorer(s)	Attendance
R2	22 August	Alloa Athletic	H	1–1(AET Won 3–2 on pens)	Cuthbertson 33'	849
R3	27 August	Dundee	A	1–1(AET Lost 2–3 on pens)	McDicken 45'	3,367

== Scottish Cup ==
Round	Date	Opponent	H/A	Score	Kilmarnock scorer(s)	Attendance
R3	9 February	Inverness Thistle	A	0–3		2,500

== See also ==
- List of Kilmarnock F.C. seasons
