= 1981–82 Kilmarnock F.C. season =

Kilmarnock
1981–82 season
- Chairman: Tom Lauchlan
- Manager: Jim Clunie
- Scottish First Division: 2nd
- Scottish Cup: QF
- Scottish League Cup: GS
- Top goalscorer: League: John Bourke 14; All: John Bourke 19
- Highest home attendance: 9,997 (v Heart of Midlothian, 8 May)
- Lowest home attendance: 1,308 (v Clydebank, 21 April)
- Average home league attendance: 2,643 (down 1,864)

The 1981–82 season was Kilmarnock's 80th in Scottish League Competitions. They finished in 2nd place after a very impressive run of only 1 defeat in the last 20 league matches(to eventual champions Motherwell) and were promoted at the end of the season to the Premier Division.

== Scottish First Division ==
=== League table ===
Pos	Team	Pld	W	D	L	GF	GA	GD	Pts	Promotion or relegation
1	Motherwell (C, P)	39	26	9	4	92	36	+56	61	Promotion to the Premier Division
2	Kilmarnock (P)	39	17	17	5	60	29	+31	51	Promotion to the Premier Division
3	Heart of Midlothian	39	21	8	10	65	37	+28	50	
4	Clydebank	39	19	8	12	61	53	+8	46	
5	St Johnstone	39	17	8	14	69	60	+9	42	

Source: RSSSF
Rules for classification: 1) points; 2) goal difference; 3) number of goals scored.
(C) Champions; (P) Promoted

=== Match results ===
Match Day	Date	Opponent	H/A	Score	Kilmarnock scorer(s)	Attendance
1	29 August	Motherwell	H	2–0	Carson 10 o.g., Gallacher 86'	2,694
2	5 September	Heart of Midlothian	A	1–0	Robertson 6'	4,796
3	8 September	Clydebank	A	0–0		1,012
4	12 September	Ayr United	H	1–1	Gallacher 76'	5,477
5	16 September	Queen of the South	A	1–1	Clarke 37'	1,722
6	19 September	Queen's Park	H	0–0		2,337
7	23 September	St Johnstone	A	2–0	Bourke 35', Clark 45'	1,734
8	29 September	East Stirlingshire	A	1–2	McCready 19'	707
9	3 October	Dunfermline Athletic	H	0–1		2,137
10	10 October	Falkirk	H	2–2	Eadie 33', 54'	1,423
11	17 October	Hamilton Academical	A	2–1	Gallacher 68', Bourke 87'	1,747
12	24 October	Dumbarton	A	2–0	Mauchlen 67', Clark 77'	799
13	31 October	Raith Rovers	H	1–1	Gallacher 27'	1,859
14	7 November	Heart of Midlothian	H	0–0		3,348
15	14 November	Motherwell	A	0–2		5,068
16	21 November	Queen of the South	H	0–0		1,591
17	28 November	East Stirlingshire	H	2–0	Eadie 25', Gallacher 59'	1,391
18	5 December	Dunfermline Athletic	A	2–1	McBride 14', McDicken 23'	1,665
19	12 December	St Johnstone	H	0–2		1,811
20	16 January	Hamilton Academical	H	2–2	Mauchlen 13', Bryson 32' pen.	1,480
21	30 January	Dumbarton	H	0–0		1,346
22	17 February	Falkirk	A	2–2	Bourke 7', 19'	1,115
23	20 February	Queen's Park	A	2–0	Clarke 44', Gallacher 71'	1,253
24	27 February	Ayr United	H	1–1	McGivern 49'	4,041
25	10 March	Dunfermline Athletic	H	2–0	Bryson 77' pen., Bourke 89'	1,356
26	13 March	Raith Rovers	A	3–0	Mauchlen 25', Bourke 61', McDicken 89'	1,220
27	17 March	Ayr United	A	1–1	McDicken 90'	3,663
28	20 March	Falkirk	H	4–1	MacLeod 34', Bourke 52', Armstrong 54', McDicken 80'	1,905
29	27 March	Motherwell	A	0–1		4,816
30	30 March	Queen's Park	A	3–2	McDicken 33', Gallacher 67', 85'	1,197
31	3 April	Clydebank	H	0–0		2,087
32	6 April	Raith Rovers	A	3–3	Bryson 1', Clarke 45', Bourke 76'	1,401
33	10 April	St Johnstone	A	3–1	Mauchlen 75', Clarke 76', Bourke 82'	2,209
34	17 April	Hamilton Academical	H	0–0		1,878
35	21 April	Clydebank	H	2–0	Bourke 23', 52'	1,308
36	24 April	Dumbarton	A	2–0	McDicken 62', 82'	715
37	1 May	East Stirlingshire	A	5–1	Bourke 8', 88', Robertson 14', McLean 18' pen., McGivern 28'	482
38	8 May	Heart of Midlothian	H	0–0		9,997
39	15 May	Queen of the South	H	6–0	Gallacher 6', 8', Robertson 26' o.g., Armstrong 38', McDicken 44', Bourke 60'	2,363

== Scottish League Cup ==
=== Group stage ===
Round	Date	Opponent	H/A	Score	Kilmarnock scorer(s)	Attendance
G3	8 August	Aberdeen	A	0–3		8,094
G3	12 August	Airdrieonians	H	1–1	Bourke 80'	1,901
G3	15 August	Heart of Midlothian	A	1–1	Wilson 81' pen.	7,746
G3	19 August	Airdrieonians	A	1–0	Bourke 11'	1,380
G3	22 August	Aberdeen	H	0–3		3,118
G3	26 August	Heart of Midlothian	H	2–0	Clark 3', McLean 16' pen.	1,388

=== Group 3 final table ===
P	Team	Pld	W	D	L	GF	GA	GD	Pts
1	Aberdeen	6	4	1	1	12	1	11	9
2	Kilmarnock	6	2	2	2	5	8	−3	6
3	Heart of Midlothian	6	2	1	3	5	9	−4	5
4	Airdrieonians	6	1	2	3	4	8	−4	4

== Scottish Cup ==
Round	Date	Opponent	H/A	Score	Kilmarnock scorer(s)	Attendance
R3	6 February	Montrose	H	1–0	Bourke 85'	1,441
R4	13 February	St Johnstone	H	3–1	McGivern 25', Bourke 59', 87'	2,693
QF	6 March	Aberdeen	A	2–4	McGivern 1', Gallacher 36'	9,000

== See also ==
- List of Kilmarnock F.C. seasons
