= 1983–84 Kilmarnock F.C. season =

Kilmarnock
1983–84 season
- Chairman: Tom Lauchlan
- Manager: Jim Clunie
- Scottish First Division: 6th
- Scottish Cup: 3R
- Scottish League Cup: 3R
- Top goalscorer: League: Brian Gallagher 11, Robert Clark 11; All: Brian Gallagher 16
- Highest home attendance: 3,111 (v Partick Thistle, 31 December)
- Lowest home attendance: 460 (v Alloa Athletic, 28 April)
- Average home league attendance: 1,359 (down 2,103)

The 1983–84 season was Kilmarnock's 82nd in Scottish League Competitions.

After being relegated the previous season, the club's board of directors announced a plan in July to return to full time football for the first time since 1971. To raise the finance, the club proposed a covenant scheme which would involve 7,000 supporters pledging £30 per annum over a three or four-year period.

The plan was ditched in September due to the lack of response from supporters which was hardly surprising given that the average attendance the previous season was less than half of the required number.

The support dwindled further during the season with 4 home league games recording an attendance of less than 1,000. The average attendance of 1,359 was the lowest recorded in the 20th century.

On the field, Killie finished in mid table despite a promising start of 7 wins in their first 9 games. However, a run of 10 games without a win in the new year put the club near the relegation zone. Three wins from the final 5 games sealed their place in the league for another season.

== Scottish First Division ==
=== League table ===
Pos	Team	Pld	W	D	L	GF	GA	GD	Pts
4	Clydebank	39	16	13	10	62	50	+12	45
5	Brechin City	39	14	14	11	56	58	−2	42
6	Kilmarnock	39	16	6	17	57	53	+4	38
7	Falkirk	39	16	6	17	46	54	−8	38
8	Clyde	39	12	13	14	53	50	+3	37

Source: RSSSF and statto
Rules for classification: 1) points; 2) goal difference; 3) number of goals scored.

=== Match results ===
Match Day	Date	Opponent	H/A	Score	Kilmarnock scorer(s)	Attendance
1	20 August	Ayr United	A	2–0	Bryson 23', McDicken 35'	3,129
2	3 September	Partick Thistle	A	0–2		2,252
3	10 September	Falkirk	H	2–1	R.Clark 72' pen., 89' pen.	1,485
4	12 September	Meadowbank Thistle	H	3–1	McGivern 45', MacLeod 52', Gallacher 56'	1,028
5	17 September	Hamilton Academical	A	1–0	R.Clark 21'	1,407
6	24 September	Alloa Athletic	H	2–0	McDicken 24', Gallacher 57'	1,415
7	28 September	Clydebank	A	0–4		855
8	1 October	Clyde	A	1–0	R.Clark 26'	791
9	8 October	Brechin City	H	4–1	McKinna 10', McGivern 26', 70', MacLeod 50'	1,420
10	15 October	Airdrieonians	A	0–1		1,317
11	22 October	Dumbarton	H	2–2	McDicken 58', Bryson 70'	1,747
12	29 October	Raith Rovers	H	2–1	R.Clark 48', Clarke 61'	1,397
13	5 November	Greenock Morton	A	2–2	McKinna 30', 77'	1,902
14	12 November	Meadowbank Thistle	A	1–2	Bryson 30'	836
15	19 November	Hamilton Academical	H	2–1	Bryson 35', Gallacher 81'	1,257
16	26 November	Brechin City	A	2–3	Gallacher 71', McKinna 85'	799
17	3 December	Clyde	H	0–1		1,377
18	10 December	Alloa Athletic	A	4–0	McDicken 4', McGivern 25', 80', McKinna 36'	547
19	17 December	Clydebank	H	0–1		1,149
20	26 December	Falkirk	A	3–1	McDicken 4', Mackin 48' o.g., Gallacher 75'	3,198
21	31 December	Partick Thistle	H	1–2	R.Clark 40' pen.	3,111
22	3 January	Ayr United	H	1–0	Cuthbertson 89'	2,890
23	7 January	Dumbarton	A	3–4	McClurg 39', 46', McGivern 83'	907
24	14 January	Airdrieonians	H	4–1	McDicken 15', 90', R.Clark 67' pen., 71'	1,310
25	4 February	Greenock Morton	H	0–1		1,313
26	11 February	Brechin City	H	1–1	R.Clark 50' pen.	910
27	25 February	Clydebank	A	0–3		724
28	29 February	Raith Rovers	A	1–2	Gallacher 81'	768
29	3 March	Hamilton Academical	A	1–1	McGivern 23'	874
30	10 March	Dumbarton	H	0–0		1,140
31	17 March	Airdrieonians	A	0–3		727
32	24 March	Raith Rovers	H	1–2	Brown 27'	680
33	31 March	Falkirk	A	0–2		1,203
34	7 April	Meadowbank Thistle	H	1–1	Gallacher 3'	539
35	14 April	Partick Thistle	A	2–1	Gallacher 39', Murray 65' o.g.	1,758
36	21 April	Clyde	A	1–2	R.Clark 80' pen.	633
37	28 April	Alloa Athletic	H	2–0	R.Clark 44', McKinna 57'	460
38	5 May	Ayr United	H	3–0	Gallacher 57', 89', McKinna 60'	1,495
39	12 May	Greenock Morton	A	2–3	Gallacher 78', McKinna 90'	4,547

== Scottish League Cup ==
=== Second round ===
Round	Date	Opponent	H/A	Score	Kilmarnock scorer(s)	Attendance
R2 L1	24 August	Queen's Park	A	2–3	J.Clark 36', 38'	702
R2 L2	27 August	Queen's Park	H	3–1	McGivern 21', 49', McDicken 61'	1506

=== Group stage ===
Round	Date	Opponent	H/A	Score	Kilmarnock scorer(s)	Attendance
G4	31 August	Hibernian	A	0–2		2,681
G4	7 September	Airdrieonians	H	3–0	Gallacher 5', 22', 55'	1,046
G4	5 October	Celtic	A	1–1	Gallacher 64'	5,435
G4	26 October	Airdrieonians	A	2–1	Clarke 47', Robertson 72'	829
G4	9 November	Hibernian	H	3–1	Clarke 33', McDicken 37', 46'	2,001
G4	30 November	Celtic	H	0–1		8,793

=== Group 4 final table ===
P	Team	Pld	W	D	L	GF	GA	GD	Pts
1	Celtic	6	3	3	0	13	3	10	9
2	Kilmarnock	6	3	1	2	9	6	3	7
3	Hibernian	6	2	2	2	7	9	−2	6
4	Airdrieonians	6	0	2	4	3	14	−11	2

== Scottish Cup ==
Round	Date	Opponent	H/A	Score	Kilmarnock scorer(s)	Attendance
R3	13 February	Aberdeen	A	1–1	Gallacher 90'	15,000
R3	15 February	Aberdeen	H	1–3	McKinna 64'	6,106

== See also ==
- List of Kilmarnock F.C. seasons
