= 1986–87 Kilmarnock F.C. season =

Kilmarnock
1986–87 season
- Chairman: Robert Lauchlan
- Manager: Eddie Morrison
- Scottish First Division: 6th
- Scottish Cup: 3R
- Scottish League Cup: 2R
- Top goalscorer: League: Jim McGuire 10; All: Jim McGuire 10
- Highest home attendance: 4,855 (v Dunfermline Athletic, 3 January)
- Lowest home attendance: 875 (v Brechin City, 25 April)
- Average home league attendance: 1,946 (down 39)

The 1986–87 season was Kilmarnock's 85th in Scottish League Competitions.

== Squad ==
Note: Flags indicate national team as defined under FIFA eligibility rules; some limited exceptions apply. Players may hold more than one non-FIFA nationality.

No.	Pos.	Nation	Player
—	MF	SCO	Ian Bryson
—	MF	SCO	Ally MacLeod
—	DF	SCO	Paul Martin
—	DF	SCO	Stuart McLean

No.	Pos.	Nation	Player
—	MF	SCO	Robert Docherty
—	MF	SCO	Sam McGivern
—	DF	SCO	Robert Clark
—	MF	SCO	John McVeigh

== Scottish First Division ==
=== Table ===
Pos	Team	Pld	W	D	L	GF	GA	GD	Pts
4	East Fife	44	15	21	8	68	55	+13	51
5	Airdrieonians	44	20	11	13	58	46	+12	51
6	Kilmarnock	44	17	11	16	62	53	+9	45
7	Forfar Athletic	44	14	15	15	61	63	−2	43
8	Partick Thistle	44	12	15	17	49	54	−5	39

Source: RSSSF and statto
Rules for classification: 1) points; 2) goal difference; 3) number of goals scored.

=== Results ===
Match Day	Date	Opponent	H/A	Score	Kilmarnock scorer(s)	Attendance
1	9 August	East Fife	A	4–1	Bryson 4', 34' pen., Cook 28', MacLeod 49'	949
2	13 August	Greenock Morton	H	2–2	McGuire 40', Cook 44'	2,468
3	16 August	Forfar Athletic	A	1–3	Bryson 28' pen.	863
4	23 August	Montrose	H	3–0	Bryson 13' pen., Martin 16', Cook 17'	1,447
5	30 August	Queen of the South	A	1–2	Cook 68'	2,588
6	6 September	Dunfermline Athletic	H	1–2	Cook 44'	2,662
7	13 September	Airdrieonians	A	2–3	Bryson 43', 69'	1,577
8	16 September	Dumbarton	H	2–1	Bryson 16', Clougherty 78' o.g.	1,664
9	20 September	Brechin City	A	2–2	Cook 26', 90'	572
10	27 September	Clyde	H	0–0		1,760
11	30 September	Partick Thistle	A	0–1		1,799
12	4 October	East Fife	H	1–1	Martin 42'	1,218
13	8 October	Greenock Morton	A	0–2		1,859
14	11 October	Montrose	A	2–0	Harkness 72', McLean 86'	496
15	18 October	Forfar Athletic	H	3–0	Harkness 63', Docherty 65', McGivern 83'	1,440
16	25 October	Airdrieonians	H	2–0	Harkness 36', MacLeod 74'	2,005
17	29 October	Dumbarton	A	0–2		925
18	1 November	Dunfermline Athletic	A	0–1		4,179
19	8 November	Queen of the South	H	3–2	McGivern 2', McGuire 50', MacLeod 89' pen.	1,904
20	15 November	Brechin City	H	0–1		1,600
21	22 November	Clyde	A	0–0		1,524
22	29 November	Partick Thistle	H	3–2	Cuthbertson 40', R.Clark 52', McGuire 75'	2,502
23	6 December	East Fife	A	1–2	R.Clark 25' pen.	1,372
24	13 December	Greenock Morton	H	2–0	Harkness 1', McGuire 73'	1,989
25	20 December	Montrose	H	1–0	Harkness 1'	1,620
26	27 December	Forfar Athletic	A	1–1	McGuire 14'	818
27	1 January	Queen of the South	A	2–1	Cook 17', McVeigh 67'	2,009
28	3 January	Dunfermline Athletic	H	2–2	McGuire 58', Reid 90'	4,855
29	24 January	Airdrieonians	H	0–0		1,983
30	27 January	Dumbarton	H	1–2	McVeigh 28'	2,209
31	7 February	Clyde	H	1–1	McLean 44'	1,769
32	17 February	Brechin City	A	0–1		513
33	28 February	East Fife	H	3–1	Reid 1', 30', Harkness 43'	1,434
34	3 March	Partick Thistle	A	2–1	Bryson 30' pen., McGuire 62'	1,383
35	11 March	Greenock Morton	A	1–2	Cuthbertson 46'	2,420
36	14 March	Montrose	A	1–1	Harkness 80'	417
37	21 March	Forfar Athletic	H	2–0	Reid 63', Bryson 85' pen.	1,059
38	28 March	Queen of the South	H	2–2	Bryson 19', Reid 73'	1,675
39	4 April	Dunfermline Athletic	A	1–0	Harkness 5'	3,704
40	11 April	Dumbarton	A	2–3	Reid 11', 16'	1,030
41	18 April	Airdrieonians	A	3–4	Cuthbertson 46', Reid 54', McVeigh 87'	1,028
42	25 April	Brechin City	H	0–1		875
43	2 May	Clyde	A	1–0	Reid 86'	638
44	9 May	Partick Thistle	H	1–0	McVeigh 60'	1,453

== Scottish League Cup ==
Round	Date	Opponent	H/A	Score	Kilmarnock scorer(s)	Attendance
R2	20 August	Ayr United	H	1–2	McCafferty 80'	3,553

== Scottish Cup ==
Round	Date	Opponent	H/A	Score	Kilmarnock scorer(s)	Attendance
R3	31 January	Heart of Midlothian	A	0–0		15,227
R3R	4 February	Heart of Midlothian	H	1–1	Bryson 44' pen.	14,932
R3,2R	9 February	Heart of Midlothian	H	1–3	Martin 73'	14,150

== See also ==
- List of Kilmarnock F.C. seasons
