= 1985–86 Kilmarnock F.C. season =

Kilmarnock
1985–86 season
- Manager: Eddie Morrison
- Scottish First Division: 3rd
- Scottish Cup: 4R
- Scottish League Cup: 2R
- Top goalscorer: League: Ian Bryson 14; All: Ian Bryson 15
- Highest home attendance: 4,119 (v Ayr United, 1 January)
- Lowest home attendance: 1,260 (v Alloa Athletic, 15 March)
- Average home league attendance: 1,985 (up 634)

The 1985–86 season was Kilmarnock's 84th in Scottish League Competitions.

Killie made a very impressive start to the league campaign in Eddie Morrison's first full season in charge. They were top of the table after 18 matches of the back of 4 consecutive victories and only 3 defeats. However, an inexplicable collapse followed in December. The club lost the next 3 matches all by the margin of 4–1 and then a home defeat by local rivals Ayr United.

Despite a less than impressive run of 4 wins in the next 10 matches, Killie were still firmly in the hunt for promotion. However, 3 defeats in the last 7 matches meant the club missed promotion by a point.

The first of these defeats saw Killie lose 2 late goals to Brechin City and lost the game 2–1.

Killie missed a retaken penalty seven minutes from time against Forfar Athletic and lost 1–0 then missed another penalty in the penultimate league game against Partick Thistle in the 62 minute with the score at 0–0.

== Scottish First Division ==
=== League table ===
Pos	Team	Pld	W	D	L	GF	GA	GD	Pts	Promotion or relegation
1	Hamilton Academical (C, P)	39	24	8	7	77	44	+33	56	Promotion to the Premier Division
2	Falkirk (P)	39	17	11	11	57	39	+18	45	Promotion to the Premier Division
3	Kilmarnock	39	18	8	13	62	49	+13	44	
4	Forfar Athletic	39	17	10	12	51	43	+8	44	
5	East Fife	39	14	15	10	54	46	+8	43	

Source: RSSSF and statto
Rules for classification: 1) points; 2) goal difference; 3) number of goals scored.
(C) Champions; (P) Promoted

=== Match results ===
Match Day	Date	Opponent	H/A	Score	Kilmarnock scorer(s)	Attendance
1	10 August	Alloa Athletic	H	3–0	McLean 50', Millar 51', McGivern 68'	1,439
2	17 August	Forfar Athletic	A	0–0		967
3	24 August	Hamilton Academical	H	1–0	Millar 52'	1,752
4	31 August	Ayr United	A	0–3		2,749
5	7 September	Partick Thistle	H	5–0	Bryson 6', Cuthbertson 21', McLean 29' pen., McGivern 44', Clarke 78'	1,944
6	14 September	Greenock Morton	A	0–3		1,434
7	21 September	Clyde	H	1–1	Millar 2'	2,005
8	28 September	Brechin City	A	4–2	Neilson 34' o.g., Bryson 60', Sarwar 72', McKinna 86'	662
9	5 October	Falkirk	H	1–0	McLean 26' pen.	1,937
10	12 October	Montrose	H	0–0		1,498
11	19 October	Dumbarton	A	0–1		1,559
12	26 October	Airdrieonians	A	2–1	Clarke 69', 88'	1,513
13	2 November	East Fife	H	2–2	Cuthbertson 26', 88'	1,425
14	9 November	Partick Thistle	A	1–1	Bryson 49' pen.	2,391
15	16 November	Greenock Morton	H	3–0	Cockburn 4', Martin 44', Cuthbertson 62'	1,837
16	23 November	Clyde	A	3–1	McGivern 20', 78', Clarke 64'	1,102
17	30 November	Brechin City	H	3–1	Bryson 13', Millar 48', Cuthbertson 82'	2,787
18	7 December	Falkirk	A	1–0	McGivern 62'	2,542
19	14 December	Montrose	A	1–4	McKinna 87'	616
20	21 December	Dumbarton	H	1–4	Bryson 15'	2,311
21	28 December	Hamilton Academical	A	1–4	Bryson 62'	3,271
22	1 January	Ayr United	H	1–2	Bryson 88' pen.	4,119
23	4 January	Forfar Athletic	H	1–0	Millar 37'	1,296
24	11 January	Alloa Athletic	A	4–1	McGivern 25', Millar 74', 88', Cuthbertson 80'	672
25	18 January	Airdrieonians	H	0–2		1,711
26	1 February	East Fife	A	2–2	Bryson 7', 58'	1,182
27	8 February	Greenock Morton	H	1–1	Clarke 59'	2,252
28	1 March	Montrose	H	3–0	McNab 5', Bryson 8', McGuire 37'	1,502
29	8 March	Hamilton Academical	A	2–3	McGivern 17', 74'	2,345
30	15 March	Alloa Athletic	H	2–0	McCafferty 14', McNab 54'	1,260
31	22 March	Airdrieonians	A	0–1		1,409
32	25 March	Falkirk	A	1–1	McNab 29'	1,759
33	29 March	Brechin City	H	1–2	Bryson 22'	1,511
34	5 April	Clyde	A	3–1	Bryson 34', McGivern 47', 51'	820
35	9 April	East Fife	H	2–0	McGivern 9', McGuire 73'	1,320
36	12 April	Forfar Athletic	A	0–1		874
37	19 April	Dumbarton	H	3–0	Bryson 20', Clarke 83', McGuire 89'	2,321
38	26 April	Partick Thistle	A	0–2		2,835
39	3 May	Ayr United	H	3–2	Bryson 29', McGuire 28', 70'	2,369

== Scottish League Cup ==
Round	Date	Opponent	H/A	Score	Kilmarnock scorer(s)	Attendance
R2	20 August	St Mirren	A	1–3	Millar 26'	3,435

== Scottish Cup ==
Round	Date	Opponent	H/A	Score	Kilmarnock scorer(s)	Attendance
R3	25 January	Stirling Albion	H	1–0	McCafferty 33'	2,139
R4	15 February	Dundee United	A	1–1	Bryson 75'	6,610
R4R	19 February	Dundee United	H	0–1		9,054

== See also ==
- List of Kilmarnock F.C. seasons
