= Ian Fleming (footballer) =

Scottish footballer & manager (born 1953)

Personal information
- Full name: John Hares Fleming
- Date of birth: 15 January 1953 (age 73)
- Place of birth: Maybole, Scotland
- Positions: Winger; midfielder

Senior career*
Years	Team	Apps	(Gls)
1971–1975	Kilmarnock	94	(51)
1975–1979	Aberdeen	66	(12)
1979–1980	Sheffield Wednesday	14	(1)
1980–1982	Dundee	48	(5)
1982–1987	Brechin City	132	(15)
Total		354	(84)

Managerial career
- 1982–1987: Brechin City
- * Club domestic league appearances and goals

Ian Fleming (born 15 January 1953) is a Scottish former football player and manager. He played for Kilmarnock, Aberdeen, Sheffield Wednesday and Dundee and was then player-manager of Brechin City.

Aberdeen signed Fleming for $15,000 from Kilmarnock in December 1975.

Despite guiding Brechin to promotion to the First Division and the club enjoying a successful spell, Fleming was sacked by Brechin in December 1986. Fleming was then assistant manager of Forfar Athletic and manager of Icelandic side FH in 1987.

In 2011, Fleming used his football contacts to raise funds for his twin granddaughters, who suffered from cerebral palsy. The funds were needed to pay for surgery in the United States that was not available in the NHS.

== Career statistics ==
=== Club ===
Appearances and goals by club, season and competition
Club	Season	League			National Cup		League Cup		Europe		Total	
Club	Season	Division	Apps	Goals	Apps	Goals	Apps	Goals	Apps	Goals	Apps	Goals
Kilmarnock	1970–71	Scottish Division One	1	0	0	0	0	0	0	0	1	0
Kilmarnock	1971–72	Scottish Division One	5	1	0	0	0	0	0	0	5	1
Kilmarnock	1972–73	Scottish Division One	13	1	0	0	2	0	0	0	15	1
Kilmarnock	1973–74	Scottish Second Division	33	33	1	0	5	2	–	–	39	35
Kilmarnock	1974–75	Scottish Division One	29	11	1	0	8	11	0	0	38	22
Kilmarnock	1975–76	Scottish Second Division	13	5	0	0	6	1	–	–	19	6
Kilmarnock	Total		94	51	2	0	21	14	0	0	117	65
Aberdeen	1975–76	Scottish Premier Division	12	2	0	0	0	0	0	0	12	2
Aberdeen	1976–77	Scottish Premier Division	17	4	0	0	6	2	0	0	23	6
Aberdeen	1977–78	Scottish Premier Division	25	5	5	4	6	3	2	0	38	12
Aberdeen	1978–79	Scottish Premier Division	12	1	0	0	5	1	1	0	18	2
Aberdeen	Total		66	12	5	4	17	6	3	0	91	22
Sheffield Wednesday	1979–80	Third Division	13	1	–	–	–	–	–	–	13+	1+
Dundee	1979–80	Scottish Premier Division	16	3	0	0	0	0	0	0	16	3
Dundee	1980–81	Scottish First Division	8	1	0	0	4	0	–	–	12	1
Dundee	1981–82	Scottish Premier Division	16	1	2	0	6	4	0	0	24	5
Dundee	1982–83	Scottish Premier Division	8	0	0	0	4	0	0	0	12	0
Dundee	Total		48	5	2	0	14	4	0	0	64	9
Career total			221	69	9+	4+	52+	24+	3	0	285+	97+

=== Managerial ===
Managerial record by team and tenure
Team	From	To	Record				
Team	From	To	P	W	L	D	Win %
Brechin City	1982	1986	190	70	70	50	36.84%
