= McDicken =

McDicken is a surname. Notable people with the surname include:

- Derrick McDicken (born 1955), Scottish footballer
- Henry McDicken (1874–1944), Australian politician
