= Alan McCulloch =

Alan McCulloch may refer to:

- Alan McCulloch (politician), leader of the One New Zealand political party
- Alan McCulloch (footballer), Scottish footballer
- Alan McLeod McCulloch, Australian art critic and art historian

== See also ==
- Allan Riverstone McCulloch, Australian ichthyologist
