= Jim Whyte (footballer) =

Scottish footballer

Personal information
- Date of birth: 29 September 1944 (age 82)
- Place of birth: Kilsyth, Scotland
- Position: Full back

Youth career
- Kilsyth Rangers

Senior career*
Years	Team	Apps	(Gls)
1965–1970	Aberdeen	105	(7)
1970–1975	Kilmarnock	104	(1)
- Kirkintilloch Rob Roy
Total		209	(8)

International career
1965–1967	Scotland U23	2	(0)
- * Club domestic league appearances and goals

Jim Whyte (born 29 September 1944) is a Scottish former footballer who played for Kilsyth Rangers, Aberdeen, Kilmarnock and Kirkintilloch Rob Roy, as a full back.

== Career statistics ==
Appearances and goals by club, season and competition
Club	Season	League			Scottish Cup		League Cup		Europe		Total	
Club	Season	Division	Apps	Goals	Apps	Goals	Apps	Goals	Apps	Goals	Apps	Goals
Aberdeen	1964–65	Scottish Division One	0	0	0	0	0	0	0	0	0	0
Aberdeen	1965–66	Scottish Division One	25	2	5	1	0	0	0	0	30	3
Aberdeen	1966–67	Scottish Division One	30	3	6	0	10	2	0	0	46	5
Aberdeen	1967–68	Scottish Division One	28	0	3	0	6	0	4	0	41	0
Aberdeen	1968–69	Scottish Division One	19	1	6	0	6	0	0	0	31	1
Aberdeen	1969–70	Scottish Division One	3	0	0	0	1	0	0	0	4	0
Aberdeen	1970–71	Scottish Division One	0	0	0	0	1	0	0	0	1	0
Aberdeen	Total		105	6	20	1	24	2	4	0	153	9
Kilmarnock	1970–71	Scottish First Division	18	0	3	0	0	0	–	–	21	0
Kilmarnock	1971–72	Scottish First Division	22	0	2	0	6	0	–	–	30	0
Kilmarnock	1972–73	Scottish First Division	33	1	2	0	6	0	–	–	41	1
Kilmarnock	1973–74	Scottish Second Division	29	0	1	0	10	0	–	–	40	0
Kilmarnock	1974–75	Scottish First Division	2	0	0	0	2	0	–	–	4	0
Kilmarnock	Total		104	1	8	0	24	0	-	-	136	1
Career total			209	7	28	1	48	2	4	0	289	10
