= Willie Waddell (footballer, born 1950) =

Scottish footballer (born 1950)

Personal information
- Full name: William Waddell
- Date of birth: 16 April 1950 (age 76)
- Place of birth: Denny, Falkirk, Scotland
- Height: 1.80 m (5 ft 11 in)
- Position: Inside forward

Senior career*
| Years | Team | Apps | (Gls) |
| 1967–1969 | Leeds United | 0 | (0) |
| 1969–1971 | Kilmarnock | 24 | (2) |
| 1971–1972 | Barnsley | 18 | (4) |
| 1972–1974 | Hartlepool United | 48 | (9) |
| 1973 | → Workington (loan) | 3 | (0) |
| 1974 | Dundalk | 11 | (6) |
| 1974–75 | Highlands Park | | |
| 1975–76 | Durban City | | |
| 1976 | Durban United | | |

International career
| 1970 | Scottish League XI | 2 | (2) |
- * Club domestic league appearances and goals

William Waddell (born 16 April 1950) is a retired Scottish footballer. He played for Kilmarnock, Hartlepool United and Dundalk throughout the early 1970s as an inside forward, followed by a stay in South Africa.

== Career ==
Waddell began his career within the reserves of Leeds United alongside his future Kilmarnock teammate Ian Kerr. Throughout his career with The Whites, he primarily played within the reserves as an outside left but wouldn't make an official appearance throughout this period. Following two seasons of relative inactivity, he was signed by Kilmarnock manager Walter McCrae following a discussion with Leeds manager Don Revie where he would begin to play as a left winger throughout this period. He made his debut during a friendly against Aston Villa when he came in as a substitute for Tommy McLean whilst making his Scottish League Cup debut against Dundee on 16 August. Right before Kilmarnock was eliminated from the competition, Waddell was one of the goalscorers in the 6–0 thrashing against Partick Thistle. His Scottish Premier League debut came during the match against Raith Rovers on 8 September where he fouled inside forward Dave Millar. He went on to be a goalscorer across several games throughout his debut season as he initially made limited appearances. However, he would make less games into 1970 following the rough performance into the club at that point, being replaced with Jim McLean. The following 1970–71 season also saw a bad start for Waddell as he had injured his knee during the match against St Mirren for the 1970–71 Scottish Cup. He wouldn't make a single appearance for the rest of the year, not playing until January 1971. Due to these difficulties, he returned to England to play for Barnsley alongside Jimmy Seal. However, Waddell would also find difficulties in Barnsley, repeatedly receiving yellow cards throughout his tenure with the club. He soon found himself loaned to Hartlepool United around February 1972.

Throughout his time with Hartlepool, he was used as a substitute player after being unable to establish himself within the Starting XI. He found enough success to where his loaning period would extend to the 1972–73 season. He'd overall find more success within Hartlepool such as in his performance in the 2–0 victory over Northampton Town where he scored the first goal of the match. This led to Hartlepool wanting to sign Waddell full-time from Barnsley for £1,000. However, player-manager Len Ashurst demanded a quota from Waddell to score 20 goals within the season due to his promotion to the club's starting XI. Throughout the season, he played with Bobby Smith as the attacking formation of the club after the two returned from their injuries. However, he was soon dropped from the starting XI alongside John Coyne in January 1973 due to disciplinary reasons with Waddell being relegated to a substitute player again. However, his relationship with Ashurst declined to a point to where Workington sought interest in Waddell in the Fourth Division with Waddell later being signed on a brief loan.

Due to his knee injury in the first half of the 1973–74 season, he was given a free transfer in December 1973 as he was dropped from the roster. Despite East Fife openly expressing interest in signing Waddell, he joined his teammate Coyne in playing for Irish club Dundalk for the remainder of the 1973–74 season. Despite staying for a brief period of time, Waddell experienced considerably more success with Dundalk, only having two losses and scoring 6 goals in 11 games. He spent the rest of his career abroad in South Africa, playing for various clubs until his retirement in 1976.

== International career ==
Waddell was called up for the Scottish League XI's tour of Rhodesia in 1970, playing against Mashonaland United on 23 May which resulted in a 1–1 draw with Waddell himself scoring the team's only goal in the match. He later scored their second goal during their match against Manica on 31 May which ended in a 6-1 beating.

== Personal life ==
In January 1970, Waddell bought a greyhound to train his speed with.
