= Gordon Wylie =

Scottish footballer

Personal information
- Full name: Gordon Wylie
- Place of birth: Scotland
- Position: Forward

Youth career
- Glasgow University

Senior career*
Years	Team	Apps	(Gls)
1972–1974	Queen's Park	33	(4)

International career
1973	Scotland Amateurs	2	(0)
- * Club domestic league appearances and goals

Gordon Wylie is a Scottish retired amateur football forward who played in the Scottish League for Queen's Park. He was capped by Scotland at amateur level.
