= Derek Neilson =

Scottish footballer

Derek Neilson (23 January 1959 – May 2017) was a Scottish footballer who played as a goalkeeper.

== Career ==
Neilson began his career with Dundee United but left the club without making a first-team appearance after loan spells with East Stirlingshire and Meadowbank Thistle. Neilson then joined Brechin City and was a regular between the goalposts for the Glebe Park club for seven seasons from 1980 to 1987. He saw out his final years in the senior game with Berwick Rangers before turning to the juniors with Armadale Thistle in 1993.

Neilson died in May 2017 at the age of 58.
