= John McVeigh (footballer) =

Scottish footballer and manager

Personal information
- Date of birth: 25 January 1957 (age 69)
- Place of birth: Coatbridge, Scotland
- Position: Midfielder

Senior career*
Years	Team	Apps	(Gls)
1975–1981	Airdrieonians	87	(13)
1981–1982	Brisbane City		
1982–1986	Clyde	135	(6)
1986–1987	Hamilton Academical	20	(0)
1987–1988	Kilmarnock	30	(4)
1988–1989	Falkirk	24	(0)
Total		296	(23)

Managerial career
- 1997–1998: Partick Thistle
- 1999: Raith Rovers
- 2000–2002: Albion Rovers
- 2002–2004: Stenhousemuir
- 2009: Lanark United
- * Club domestic league appearances and goals

John McVeigh (born 25 January 1957) is a Scottish former football player and manager.

== Playing career ==
McVeigh started his career with Airdrieonians in 1975, before moving to Australia to play for Brisbane City. He stayed in Australia for a year, before moving back to Scotland to play for Clyde, where he spent four years, captaining the side on several occasions. He had spells at Hamilton Academical, Kilmarnock and Falkirk, before retiring from the game and becoming a coach at Falkirk.

== Managerial career ==
McVeigh's first managerial job came with Partick Thistle in 1997, although it ended in relegation to the Scottish Second Division. McVeigh moved to Dunfermline Athletic as assistant manager before becoming manager of Raith Rovers in June 1999, although he was sacked within six months amidst accusations of bullying younger players. Later receiving £5,000 after a court rule in his favour, McVeigh joined Albion Rovers, spending two years at Cliftonhill before joining Stenhousemuir in 2002. Signing a number of players from Albion, McVeigh resigned from Stenhousemuir.

In June 2009, McVeigh returned to management with Junior club Lanark United. Two months later, McVeigh was involved in an incident in which it was alleged that he hit a referee with a notebook, resulting in a four-year ban. McVeigh resigned from his post shortly after the incident.

== Personal life ==
During his short time at Raith Rovers, McVeigh was one of several footballers to appear in the film A Shot at Glory, featuring Hollywood actors Michael Keaton and Robert Duvall. The film also featured Ally McCoist in a lead role, alongside several members of the Rovers squad.

== Honours ==
=== Manager ===
Raith Rovers

- Fife Cup : 1999–00

Albion Rovers

- Lanarkshire Cup : 2001–02
