= Hugh Strachan =

Scottish footballer (1939–2023)

Personal information
- Date of birth: 21 February 1939
- Place of birth: Kilmarnock, Scotland
- Date of death: 22 May 2023 (aged 84)
- Position: Central defender

Youth career
- Cumnock

Senior career*
| Years | Team | Apps | (Gls) |
| 1957–1962 | Motherwell | 27 | (4) |
| 1962–1969 | Morton | | |
| 1969–1970 | Kilmarnock | 19 | (1) |
| 1970–1974 | Partick Thistle | 100 | (0) |
| Total | | 146 | (5) |
- * Club domestic league appearances and goals

Hugh Strachan (21 February 1939 – 22 May 2023) was a Scottish professional footballer who played as a central defender for Motherwell, Morton, Kilmarnock and Partick Thistle.

Strachan died on 22 May 2023, at the age of 84.
