= Blair Millar =

Scottish footballer

Personal information
- Date of birth: 16 October 1956 (age 70)
- Place of birth: Paisley, Scotland
- Position: Forward

Youth career
- Glentanyan Thistle

Senior career*
Years	Team	Apps	(Gls)
1977–1982	Clydebank	161	(84)
1982–1985	Airdrieonians	50	(14)
1985–1987	Kilmarnock	50	(19)
Total		261	(117)
- * Club domestic league appearances and goals

Blair Millar (born 16 October 1956), is a Scottish former footballer, who played for Clydebank, Airdrieonians and Kilmarnock.

Millar scored 101 goals in 202 appearances in all competitions while playing for Clydebank. He is fourth top in the club's all time goalscorers chart.
