= 1973–74 Scottish Division Two =

Scottish Second Division
- Season: 1973–74
- Champions: Airdrieonians
- Promoted: Airdrieonians; Kilmarnock

The 1973–74 Scottish Second Division was won by Airdrieonians who, along with second placed Kilmarnock, were promoted to the First Division. Brechin City finished at the bottom.

== Table ==
Pos	Team	Pld	W	D	L	GF	GA	GD	Pts	Promotion or relegation
1	Airdrieonians	36	28	4	4	102	25	+77	60	Promotion to the 1974–75 First Division
2	Kilmarnock	36	26	6	4	96	44	+52	58	Promotion to the 1974–75 First Division
3	Hamilton Academical	36	24	7	5	68	38	+30	55	
4	Queen of the South	36	20	7	9	73	41	+32	47	
5	Berwick Rangers	36	16	13	7	53	35	+18	45	
6	Raith Rovers	36	18	9	9	69	48	+21	45	
7	Stirling Albion	36	17	6	13	76	50	+26	40	
8	Montrose	36	15	7	14	71	64	+7	37	
9	Stranraer	36	14	8	14	64	70	−6	36	
10	Clydebank	36	13	8	15	47	48	−1	34	
11	St Mirren	36	12	10	14	62	66	−4	34	
12	Alloa Athletic	36	15	4	17	47	58	−11	34	
13	Cowdenbeath	36	11	9	16	59	85	−26	31	
14	Queen's Park	36	12	4	20	42	64	−22	28	
15	Stenhousemuir	36	11	5	20	44	59	−15	27	
16	East Stirlingshire	36	9	5	22	47	73	−26	23	
17	Albion Rovers	36	7	6	23	38	72	−34	20	
18	Forfar Athletic	36	5	6	25	42	94	−52	16	
19	Brechin City	36	5	4	27	33	99	−66	14	

Source: "1973-1974 Second Division - SPFL Archive". SPFL.
