= Sandy McLaughlan =

Scottish footballer

- Born: Alexander Donaldson McLaughlan; 17 July 1936
- Died: 13 April 1990 (aged 53)
- Occupation: Football goalkeeper
- Known for: played for Kilmarnock and Sunderland
- Height: 5 ft 8 in (173 cm)

Alexander Donaldson McLaughlan (17 July 1936 – 13 April 1990) was a Scottish football goalkeeper, who played for Kilmarnock and Sunderland. McLaughlan represented the Scottish League once, in 1962. He played in the 1962/63 Scottish League Cup Final for Killie, losing 1–0 to Hearts.
