= Iain Jardine =

Scottish footballer

Personal information
- Date of birth: 17 February 1958 (age 68)
- Place of birth: Irvine, Scotland
- Position: Midfielder

Youth career
- Irvine Victoria

Senior career*
Years	Team	Apps	(Gls)
1976–1980	Kilmarnock	82	(5)
1980–1984	Partick Thistle	116	(12)
1984–1985	Anorthosis Famagusta		
1985–1989	Heart of Midlothian	70	(11)
1989–1990	Partick Thistle	12	(0)
- Kilwinning Rangers
Total		280	(28)

International career
1978	Scotland U21	1	(0)
- * Club domestic league appearances and goals

Iain Jardine (born 17 February 1958) is a Scottish former professional footballer who played as a midfielder.

== Career ==
Born in Irvine, Jardine played in Scotland and Cyprus for Irvine Victoria, Kilmarnock, Partick Thistle, Anorthosis Famagusta, Heart of Midlothian and Kilwinning Rangers.
