= Billy Murdoch (footballer) =

Scottish footballer

Personal information
- Full name: William Hart McDonald Murdoch
- Date of birth: 21 April 1949 (age 77)
- Place of birth: Rutherglen, Scotland
- Position: Midfielder

Youth career
- –1967: Drumchapel Amateurs
- 1967–1970: Celtic
- 1967–1968: → Kilsyth Rangers (loan)

Senior career*
Years	Team	Apps	(Gls)
1970	Bristol City		
1970–1976	Stenhousemuir	155	(28)
1976–1979	Kilmarnock	66	(3)
1979–1980	Stenhousemuir	6	(0)
- Cumbernauld United
Total		227	(31)
- * Club domestic league appearances and goals

William Hart McDonald Murdoch (born 21 April 1949) is a Scottish former professional footballer, who played across the country's three senior divisions for Stenhousemuir and Kilmarnock. His older brother is the late Bobby Murdoch, also a footballer and one of Celtic's most decorated players.

== Career ==
=== Celtic ===
A wing half (midfielder), Murdoch – known as Billy or sometimes as Willie – began his football career as a youth at Drumchapel Amateurs, where he was spotted by Celtic in 1967. He spent his first season out on loan at Kilsyth Rangers (who had also shown an interest in signing him) and whilst on assignment was selected for the Scotland Junior international team for a match against Wales in 1968, scoring a penalty.

Murdoch was a peripheral member of the Quality Street Gang, the club's promising reserve squad of the late 1960s. Although some of his contemporaries such as Kenny Dalglish, Davie Hay and Danny McGrain became star players, Murdoch never made a first-team appearance - Celtic were not only dominant in Scotland but one of the best sides in Europe during that period and he was in competition for a place with various Scottish internationals and European Cup winners, including his brother. After two years of part-time training and infrequent reserve matches while also learning a trade as a glazier, Murdoch left Celtic at his own request in 1970 and signed for Bristol City.

=== Stenhousemuir ===
After a short spell in England Murdoch was homesick and returned to his home country to play with semi-professional Stenhousemuir, with manager Alex Smith having been alerted to his availability due to a mutual connection with a glazing company.

In 1972, he scored the winning goal in one of Stenny's most memorable victories, a 2–1 Scottish League Cup second leg win over Rangers at Ibrox Park. The Glasgow giants (the holders of the UEFA Cup Winners Cup at the time) had already won the first leg 5–0 but still included a number of their regulars in the return line-up. The outcome was bittersweet for the Stenhousemuir board who had agreed to Smith's request to retain the £100-a-head player win bonus as motivation (despite there being no chance of winning the tie overall); the unexpected victory led to financial hardship for the club.

=== Kilmarnock ===
Murdoch moved to Kilmarnock in 1976 for a fee of £10,000 and played for four seasons at Rugby Park during which time the club fluctuated between the top two national divisions (promoted in 1976, relegated in 1977, promoted in 1979) and also had financial problems which meant they were unable to employ their players on a full-time basis.

Perhaps Murdoch's most fondly remembered contribution was scoring in a 6–1 victory over local rivals Ayr United in a 1976–77 Scottish Premier Division fixture. He played in a total of 78 games for Killie and scored 4 goals.

=== Return to Ochilview ===
In 1979 Murdoch left Kilmarnock and returned to Stenhousemuir to see out his senior career. In total he made 161 league appearances for the club over his two spells. He also spent a spell back in the Junior grade with Cumbernauld United.

== Personal life ==
Murdoch was raised in Rutherglen and attended St Columbkilles School. In 2016, he was one of the guests present at a ceremony at Rutherglen Town Hall for the unveiling of a plaque commemorating his brother Bobby's achievements.

A third Murdoch brother, James a.k.a. Jimmy, was also on Celtic's books as a youth (signed from Glasgow Amateurs) before moving to Cardiff City, and also played for Cumbernauld.

== See also ==
- List of Scottish football families
