= Brian Gallacher =

Scottish footballer

Brian Gallagher
Personal information
- Full name: Brian Gallagher
- Date of birth: 8 September 1958 (age 68)
- Place of birth: Glasgow, Scotland
- Height: 5 ft 9 in (1.75 m)
- Position: Midfielder

Youth career
- Radnor Park

Senior career*
Years	Team	Apps	(Gls)
1977–1981	Dumbarton	139	(42)
1981–1984	Kilmarnock	104	(30)
1984–1988	St Mirren	99	(16)
1988–1991	Partick Thistle	40	(2)
1991–1992	Albion Rovers	16	(0)
- Caledonian
- * Club domestic league appearances and goals

Brian Gallagher (born 8 September 1958 in Glasgow) is a Scottish former footballer who played for Dumbarton, St Mirren, Kilmarnock, Partick Thistle, Albion Rovers and Inverness Caledonian.

It has been reported that Brian is related to the family of footballers beginning with Patsy Gallacher in the early 20th century, but this is inaccurate, although the family does include a male with the same forename and of similar age.

== Honours ==
- Stirlingshire Cup: 1980–81
