= Andy King (footballer, born 1942) =

Scottish footballer

Personal information
- Date of birth: 23 July 1942
- Place of birth: Scotland
- Date of death: 23 February 2015 (aged 72)
- Position: Defender

Youth career
- Saxone Amateurs

Senior career*
Years	Team	Apps	(Gls)
1961–1972	Kilmarnock	224	(5)

International career
1963–1964	Scotland U23	3	(0)
1964	SFL trial v SFA	1	(0)
- * Club domestic league appearances and goals

Andy King (23 July 1942 – 23 February 2015) was a Scottish professional footballer who played for Kilmarnock, as a defender.

== See also ==
- List of one-club men in association football
