= Robert Clark (footballer, born 1962) =

Scottish footballer

Personal information
- Full name: Robert Clark
- Date of birth: 4 November 1962 (age 63)
- Place of birth: Hamilton, Scotland
- Position: Defender

Senior career*
Years	Team	Apps	(Gls)
1980–1982	Rangers	1	(0)
1982–1984	Kilmarnock	66	(12)
1984–1986	Motherwell	13	(1)
1986–1987	Kilmarnock	44	(2)
1987–1992	Albion Rovers	149	(13)
1992	Stirling Albion	7	(0)
1993	East Stirlingshire	3	(0)
- * Club domestic league appearances and goals

Robert Clark (born 4 November 1962 in Hamilton) is a Scottish former professional footballer who is best known for his time with Kilmarnock.

Clark began his career at Blantyre Victoria before joining Rangers in 1980. He stayed there for two seasons, making one appearance before moving on to Kilmarnock. After spells with Motherwell, a second term at Kilmarnock, Clark moved on to Albion Rovers in 1987. He enjoyed a successful spell at the club, making over one hundred and fifty appearances. Clark wound down his career at Stirling Albion and East Stirlingshire then re-joined the junior leagues with Shotts Bon Accord.
