= Ross Mathie =

Scottish footballer and manager

Ross Clarkston Mathie (born 13 November 1946) is a Scottish football former player and coach.

Mathie played for Cambuslang Rangers, Kilmarnock, Dumbarton, Berwick Rangers, Falkirk and Shotts Bon Accord.

He later coached the Scotland under-17 team. Mathie left his post as Scotland's under-17 coach in August 2011 and retired in November 2011.
