= Jackie McGrory =

Scottish footballer

Personal information
- Full name: John McGrory
- Date of birth: 15 November 1941
- Place of birth: Renfrew, Scotland
- Date of death: 2004 (aged 62–63)
- Position: Central defender

Youth career
- Kilmarnock Amateurs

Senior career*
Years	Team	Apps	(Gls)
1960–1973	Kilmarnock	336	(0)

International career
1964	Scotland under-23	3	(0)
1964	SFL trial v SFA	1	(0)
1964–1967	Scotland	6	(0)
- * Club domestic league appearances and goals

John McGrory (born 15 November 1941; died 2004) was a Scottish footballer who played for Kilmarnock for his whole senior career; this period included the 1964/65 season, when Killie won the Scottish league championship for the only time in their history. He also won six caps for the Scotland national football team. Three of these appearances were during a 1967 overseas tour that the Scottish Football Association decided in October 2021 to reclassify as full internationals, which increased McGrory's cap tally from three to six.

== See also ==
- List of one-club men
