= Ian Fallis =

Scottish footballer

Personal information
- Full name: Ian Blair Fallis
- Date of birth: 26 January 1954
- Date of death: 3 October 1977 (aged 23)

Senior career*
Years	Team	Apps	(Gls)
- Queen's Park
1974–1977	Kilmarnock	81	(24)
- * Club domestic league appearances and goals

Ian Blair Fallis (26 January 1954 – 3 October 1977) was a Scottish footballer who played as a forward.

Fallis started his career with Queen's Park before moving to Kilmarnock in 1974 where he scored 24 goals in 81 appearances.

Fallis, who latterly lived at Chryston, Lanarkshire, died in Glasgow Royal Infirmary aged 23 on 3 October 1977 as a result of a car accident in a three vehicle collision at Coatbridge.
