= Ally MacLeod (footballer, born 1960) =

Scottish footballer (born 1960)

Personal information
- Full name: Alastair Fraser MacLeod
- Date of birth: 20 October 1960 (age 66)
- Place of birth: Glasgow, Scotland
- Positions: Left back; midfielder

Youth career
- Glasgow Amateurs

Senior career*
| Years | Team | Apps | (Gls) |
| 1977–1982 | Dumbarton | 124 | (5) |
| 1982–1987 | Kilmarnock | 151 | (7) |
| 1987–1988 | Raith Rovers | 30 | (0) |
| Total | | 305 | (12) |
- * Club domestic league appearances and goals

Alastair Fraser MacLeod (born 20 October 1960) was a Scottish footballer who played for Dumbarton, Kilmarnock and Raith Rovers.
