= Ally Hunter =

Scottish footballer (born 1949)

Personal information
- Full name: Alistair Robert Hunter
- Date of birth: 4 October 1949 (age 77)
- Place of birth: Glasgow, Scotland
- Position: Goalkeeper

Youth career
- 1966–1968: Drumchapel Amateurs

Senior career*
Years	Team	Apps	(Gls)
1968–1969	Johnstone Burgh		
1969–1973	Kilmarnock	76	(0)
1973–1976	Celtic	60	(0)
1976–1977	Motherwell	8	(0)
1977–1978	St Mirren	7	(0)
1978–1979	Clydebank	0	(0)
Total		151	(0)

International career
1971–1972	Scotland U23	3	(0)
1972–1973	Scotland	4	(0)
- * Club domestic league appearances and goals

Ally Hunter (born 4 October 1949 in Glasgow) is a Scottish former football goalkeeper, who played for Kilmarnock, Celtic, Motherwell, St Mirren and Scotland.

His longest service was four seasons at Kilmarnock between 1969 and 1973.

With Celtic he won the Scottish League in 1972-73 and 1973-74, and the Scottish League Cup in 1974-75.

As well as four full caps, Hunter played for the Scottish League XI once, in 1972.
