= Iain McCulloch =

Scottish footballer

Personal information
- Full name: John Balfour McCulloch
- Date of birth: 28 December 1954 (age 71)
- Place of birth: Kilmarnock, Scotland
- Position: Winger

Youth career
- Hurlford United

Senior career*
Years	Team	Apps	(Gls)
1973–1978	Kilmarnock	115	(14)
1978–1984	Notts County	215	(51)
- Kettering Town
Total		330	(65)

International career
1982	Scotland under-21	2	(0)
- * Club domestic league appearances and goals

John Balfour "Iain" McCulloch (born 28 December 1954) is a Scottish former footballer.

Playing as a winger or forward, McCulloch began his career with his hometown club Kilmarnock before joining Notts County in 1978. He won promotion with the Magpies in 1980–81, and was their top scorer in the First Division for two consecutive seasons. After County's relegation in 1984, he joined Kettering Town.

McCulloch played twice for the Scotland national under-21 football team, as an over-age player, in 1982.

He had a spell as a coach at Carlton Town
