= Jim McSherry =

Scottish footballer and manager

James McSherry (born 12 February 1952) is a Scottish former football player and manager.

== Football career ==
McSherry's career started with Kilmarnock in 1970. A midfielder, McSherry had 118 appearances for the club and scored 8 goals. In 1975, he joined local rivals Ayr United, where he had 190 appearances and scored 10 goals. In 1982, McSherry joined Berwick Rangers as player-manager with 24 appearances and scored one goal. After leaving the Borderers in January 1983, McSherry had a short spell with Stirling Albion before spending a season with Cypriot club Pezoporikos Larnaca. In 1984, McSherry returned to the Binos for another brief spell before retiring from the game.

== Post-playing career ==
In 1989, McSherry returned to football management, as assistant to Jim Fleeting at Rugby Park with Killie and departed his position in 1992 before being appointed as Kilmarnock's commercial manager at Rugby Park and is currently main host of the Wee Windaes hostelry in Ayr.
