= Billy Dickson (footballer) =

Scottish footballer

Personal information
- Full name: William Dickson
- Date of birth: 8 April 1945 (age 81)
- Place of birth: Larkhall, Scotland
- Position: Left back

Youth career
- Birkenshaw Amateurs

Senior career*
Years	Team	Apps	(Gls)
1964–1974	Kilmarnock	186	(6)
1974–1975	Motherwell	12	(0)
1977–1978	Hamilton Academical	3	(0)

International career
1970–1971	Scotland	5	(0)
1970–1971	Scottish League XI	3	(0)
- * Club domestic league appearances and goals

William Dickson (born 8 April 1945 in Larkhall) is a Scottish former footballer, who played most notably for Kilmarnock and Scotland.

He played for Kilmarnock for approximately a decade, winning international honours in 1970 and 1971. After a season with Motherwell, he became a coach at Ayr United. He briefly resumed his playing career with Hamilton.
