= Walter McCrae =

Scottish footballer and manager

Walter McCrae OBE (1929 - 22 September 2006) was a Scottish footballer and manager best known for managing Kilmarnock from 1968-1973. McCrae also played as a goalkeeper for Kilmarnock Juniors and later served as secretary at Kilmarnock throughout the 1980s.
