= Jim Cook (footballer, born 1948) =

Scottish footballer (born 1948)

Personal information
- Date of birth: 16 February 1948 (age 78)
- Place of birth: Fauldhouse, Scotland
- Position: Forward

Youth career
- Edina Hearts

Senior career*
| Years | Team | Apps | (Gls) |
| 1965–1967 | Hearts | | |
| 1967–1975 | Kilmarnock | 170 | (30) |
| 1974–1977 | Dumbarton | 67 | (7) |
| 1976–1978 | Falkirk | 21 | (1) |
- * Club domestic league appearances and goals

Jim Cook (born 16 February 1948) was a Scottish footballer who played for Hearts, Kilmarnock, Dumbarton and Falkirk.
