= Gordon Smith (footballer, born December 1954) =

Scottish footballer (born 1954)

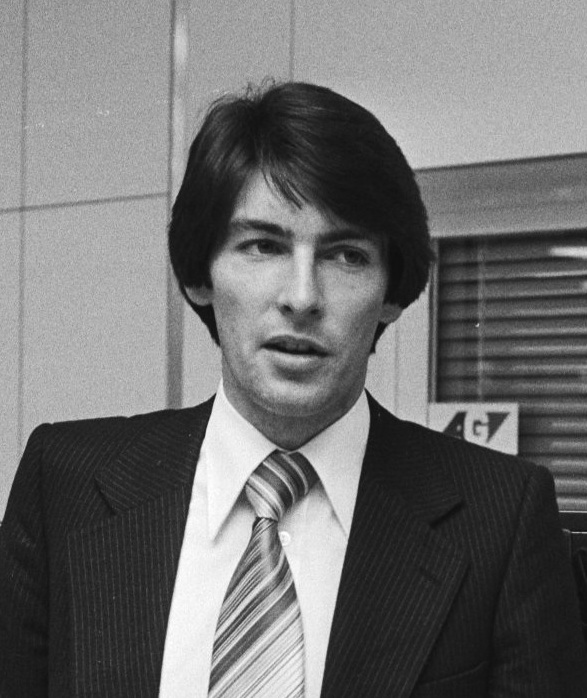
- Smith in 1978

Personal information
- Full name: Gordon Duffield Smith
- Date of birth: 29 December 1954 (age 71)
- Place of birth: Kilwinning, Scotland
- Positions: Forward; midfielder

Senior career*
Years	Team	Apps	(Gls)
1972	Troon Football Club		
1972–1977	Kilmarnock	161	(36)
1977–1980	Rangers	98	(35)
1980–1983	Brighton & Hove Albion	109	(22)
1982	→ Rangers (loan)	2	(0)
1983–1985	Manchester City	45	(15)
1985–1986	Oldham Athletic	9	(0)
1986–1987	Admira Wacker	38	(6)
1987–1988	FC Basel	25	(3)
1988	Stirling Albion	3	(0)
Total		490	(117)

International career
1975–1976	Scotland U23	5	(0)
1978	Scotland U21	1	(0)
- * Club domestic league appearances and goals

Gordon Duffield Smith (born 29 December 1954) is a Scottish former football player, coach, pundit and executive. Smith played for several clubs, beginning his career at Troon Football Club before joining Kilmarnock, Rangers, Brighton & Hove Albion and Manchester City. After retiring as a player, he worked as a football agent and BBC football pundit before being appointed chief executive of the Scottish Football Association in 2007, a post he held until his resignation on 19 April 2010. Smith then worked as the director of football of Rangers during the 2011–12 season.

Smith was also responsible for the introduction of an agreement between the Home Nations' football associations which allowed players educated in a home nation for five years before the age of eighteen to represent that nation at international level. As a result of the change in policy, several players have gone on to represent a country they were previously ineligible for.

== Playing career ==
Smith was born in Kilwinning, and started his career with Kilmarnock, following in the footsteps of his grandfather, Mattha Smith. Sold to Rangers in 1977 for £65,000, in his first season at Ibrox Smith won the domestic treble, scoring 27 goals from midfield. He also scored the winning goal in the 1978 Scottish League Cup Final, against Celtic.

He was sold to Brighton & Hove Albion in 1980 for a record transfer fee of £440,000. He returned to Rangers on loan in December 1982, playing in the 1982 League Cup Final defeat by Celtic. Smith made three appearances during his loan spell without scoring.

Smith played for Brighton in the 1983 FA Cup Final against Manchester United. He scored the first Brighton goal, but his appearance is best remembered for a chance to win the cup for Brighton late in extra time – the ball broke to Smith within 10 yards of the goal, but his shot was smothered by United goalkeeper Gary Bailey. The match ended in a 2–2 draw, and Brighton lost 4–0 in the replay.

After Brighton he joined Manchester City. He was top scorer for City in the 1984–85 season. He then had a short spell with Oldham Athletic, and played in Austria with Admira Wacker.

Smith joined Swiss club FC Basel for their 1987–88 season, signing a one-year contract under head-coach Urs Siegenthaler. He played his league debut for his new club at the St. Jakob Stadium on 12 August 1987 and scored his first goal in the same game, but it did not help the team much, because Basel were defeated 2–1 by Lausanne-Sport. His teammates included goalkeeper Urs Suter, defenders Peter Bernauer and Massimo Ceccaroni, and Switzerland national team players such as Adrian Knup, Dominique Herr and Peter Nadig; however, despite the talent of these individuals, Basel were relegated to the Nationalliga B after the 1987–88 Nationalliga A season.

During his time with Basel, Smith played a total of 26 competitive games (25 in the Nationalliga A, one in the Swiss Cup) and scored three goals, all in the domestic league.

He finished his career back in Scotland with Stirling Albion.

== After playing ==
Smith had a spell as assistant manager of St Mirren between 1990 and 1993 before beginning careers in the media and as a football agent. He represented many players, including Scotland players Paul Lambert and Kenny Miller. Smith published an autobiography in 2005, entitled "And Smith Did Score".

=== Scottish Football Association ===
Smith relinquished his career as an agent to take up the position of Scottish Football Association chief executive, which had been vacated by David Taylor moving to UEFA, in June 2007. Soon after being appointed SFA chief executive, he suggested in a book that there was "an agenda against Rangers", the team he formerly played for. Smith's spell as CEO of the Scottish FA ended when he resigned in April 2010 for personal reasons. After leaving the SFA, Smith wrote a weekly column in the Scottish edition of the Daily Express newspaper and featured on BBC Radio Scotland's Sportsound.

However, he did make his mark in international football, Smith was the driver behind the 2009 Home nations agreement, which allowed players being educated for five years under the age of 18 in a Home nation to become eligible for that nation at full international level. Due to this policy change, several players who were otherwise ineligible could play international football for the nation they were educated and raised in. Somalia-born Islam Feruz became eligible for Scotland, Chester-born Andy Dorman represented Wales and Jamaican-born Raheem Sterling went on to play for England.

=== Rangers ===
In June 2011, Smith was appointed director of football at Rangers by their new owner Craig Whyte, tasked with assisting new manager Ally McCoist. He left this role in February 2012, soon after the club entered administration.

== Honours ==
Rangers

• Premier League 1977-78

• Scottish Cup 1978 1979

• Scottish League Cup 1978 1979

Brighton & Hove Albion

- FA Cup runner-up: 1982–83
