= Sam McGivern =

Scottish footballer

Personal information
- Full name: Samuel Walker McGivern
- Date of birth: 9 October 1963 (age 63)
- Place of birth: Kilwinning, Scotland
- Position: Midfielder

Youth career
- Glenfield BC

Senior career*
Years	Team	Apps	(Gls)
1981–1987	Kilmarnock	186	(19)
1986–1993	Falkirk	153	(37)
1992–1995	Ayr United	60	(13)
1995–1997	Dumbarton	15	(1)
Medal record
Scotland
UEFA European U-18 Championship
Winner	1982 Finland	Team competition
- * Club domestic league appearances and goals

Samuel Walker McGivern (born 9 October 1963) is a Scottish former footballer who played for Kilmarnock, Falkirk, Ayr United and Dumbarton. While at Kilmarnock McGivern won the 1982 European Under-18 Championship with Scotland.
