= Ian Bryson =

Scottish footballer

Personal information
- Full name: James Ian Cook Bryson
- Date of birth: 26 November 1962 (age 63)
- Place of birth: Kilmarnock, Scotland
- Position: Midfielder

Youth career
- 1980–1981: Hurlford United

Senior career*
Years	Team	Apps	(Gls)
1981–1988	Kilmarnock	215	(40)
1988–1993	Sheffield United	156	(38)
1993	Barnsley	16	(3)
1993–1997	Preston North End	151	(19)
1997–1999	Rochdale	54	(1)
Total		495	(101)
- * Club domestic league appearances and goals

James Ian Cook Bryson (born 26 November 1962, in Kilmarnock) is a Scottish former footballer.

Bryson was a junior for Ayr United but was released at 18. He then had a short spell at Hurlford United before moving to Kilmarnock, where he spent seven years as a semi-professional whilst still working on his parents farm. Bryson made almost 200 appearances for "Killie", mostly as a midfielder.

Bryson then got a breakthrough in the pre-season of 1988, when Dave Bassett offered Bryson a trial at Sheffield United. Bryson's trial was successful and he played a crucial part in two successive promotions from the old Third Division, through to the old First Division in 1990. Bryson remained a regular for United in the top flight, assisting and scoring crucial goals, notably a double in a 3–2 victory over Nottingham Forest, which was the first win of the season after 17 games without a win.

After 5 successful years at United, Bryson left for a brief spell at Barnsley, before he joined Preston North End in 1993 on his 31st birthday, where he briefly played alongside a young David Beckham.

Bryson was appointed captain of the north west club. Although Preston lost the Third Division playoff final 4–2 to Wycombe Wanderers, Bryson himself scored with a spectacular overhead kick. Two years later he led them to the Third Division title, lifting the trophy at Deepdale in front of a capacity crowd. Bryson ended his professional league career at Rochdale, later playing for Bamber Bridge.

He is still remembered with great affection at both Sheffield United and Preston. After retiring, Bryson spent a spell coaching youngsters at North End's academy. Ian still lives in Preston and still plays regularly for AC Sporting in the Preston area Veterans League.

== Honours ==
Preston North End

- Football League Third Division: 1995–96

Individual

- PFA Team of the Year: 1995–96 Third Division
