= Alan McCulloch (footballer) =

Scottish footballer

Personal information
- Date of birth: 19 August 1953 (age 73)
- Place of birth: Barrhead, Scotland
- Position: Goalkeeper

Youth career
- Kilbirnie Ladeside

Senior career*
Years	Team	Apps	(Gls)
1973–1990	Kilmarnock	440	(0)
1978	St Mirren	10	(0)
Total		450	(0)

International career
1980	Scottish League XI	1	(0)
1980	Scotland under-21	1	(0)
- * Club domestic league appearances and goals

Alan McCulloch (born 19 August 1953) is a Scottish former footballer, who played for Kilmarnock and St Mirren. He also played for the Scottish League XI and the Scotland under-21s.

== Honours ==
- Kilmarnock Hall of Fame
