= Paul Clarke (Scottish footballer) =

Scottish footballer (born 1956)

Personal information
- Date of birth: 11 October 1956 (age 70)
- Place of birth: Ardrossan, Scotland
- Position: Centre-back

Youth career
- 1971–1972: Saltcoats Star
- 1972–1973: Kilmarnock Star

Senior career*
Years	Team	Apps	(Gls)
1973–1974	Ardrossan Winton Rovers		
1974–1986	Kilmarnock	362	(25)

International career
1978–1980	Scottish League XI	2	(0)
- * Club domestic league appearances and goals

Paul Clarke (born 11 October 1956) is a Scottish former semi-professional footballer who played for Kilmarnock as a centre-back.

== Career ==
Clarke spent some time in the youth team Kilmarnock Star alongside future team-mate at senior level, Stuart McLean, and had a loan spell in the Junior leagues with local Ardrossan Winton Rovers after signing provisionally with Kilmarnock.

His debut for Killie was versus Partick Thistle at Rugby Park in the Scottish League Cup on 9 August 1975, he scored Kilmarnock's first goal in the Premier Division format on 4 September 1976 at home to Motherwell, and his final game was also at home versus Ayrshire derby rivals Ayr United in a league match on 3 May 1986.

He left the club and retired from football at the age of 29 to join Strathclyde Police before reaching their upper recruitment age limit; despite ending his career early, he is ranked 11th on Kilmarnock's all-time appearance list, having played in 436 matches across 11 seasons in the three major competitions.

Clarke's two Scottish League XI caps were versus Italy B in 1978 and League of Ireland in 1980.

He later became involved in coaching the youth teams at Kilmarnock.

Clarke was inducted in the Kilmarnock Hall of Fame in 2018.

== Personal life ==
Paul is the older brother of former Scotland national football team manager and former Chelsea defender, Steve Clarke. The siblings played against each other during the 1982–83 season when Steve was with St Mirren; on 4 December 1982, Paul scored both Kilmarnock goals in a 2–2 draw between the sides at Rugby Park.
