= Ronnie Sheed =

Scottish footballer

Ronald Sheed (1947 – June 2018) was a Scottish footballer who played in midfield for Kilmarnock and Partick Thistle F.C.

Sheed made his Kilmarnock debut in a Fairs Cup tie against Romanian outfit Dinamo Bacau and went on to make 152 appearances for the Rugby Park club. Sheed then moved to Partick Thistle in 1977 making a handful of appearances before retiring from the senior game in 1980.

Sheed died in June 2018 at the age of 71.
