= Stuart McLean (footballer) =

Scottish footballer (born 1955)

Personal information
- Full name: Stuart Donald McLean
- Date of birth: 13 December 1955 (age 70)
- Place of birth: Glasgow, Scotland
- Position: Right-back

Youth career
- Kilmarnock Star

Senior career*
Years	Team	Apps	(Gls)
1972–1974	Darvel Juniors		
1974–1990	Kilmarnock	475	(13)

International career
1980	Scottish League XI	1	(0)
- * Club domestic league appearances and goals

Stuart McLean (born 13 December 1955) is a Scottish former footballer whose position was right-back.

In his professional career, McLean played solely for Kilmarnock, amassing over 500 games in all competitions over sixteen seasons; he is third on the club's all-time appearance list.

== Club career ==
McLean joined Kilmarnock as a teenager from Ayrshire club Darvel Juniors in 1974, and spent some time in the youth team Kilmarnock Star alongside future team-mate at senior level, Paul Clarke. After making his debut in November 1974 versus Clyde in a 4–2 defeat a few weeks before his 19th birthday, McLean thereafter became a regular in the first-team under Willie Fernie, starting 19 league games during that season in Scotland's top flight. However, while Kilmarnock finished 12th of 18 clubs, they were one of eight that missed out in the mid-1970s divisional restructure.

During McLean's spell at Kilmarnock the club had fallen from grace, after having been Scottish champions in 1965. Following their first relegation prior to McLean's arrival, the club suffered financial problems and had to revert to part-time status throughout the 1980s, even when in the Premier Division. McLean celebrated three promotions to the top flight in 1976, 1979 and 1982 (runners-up on each occasion) and then suffered three further relegations back to the second tier in 1977, 1981 and 1983 respectively. After the 1988–89 season, Kilmarnock were relegated to the third tier of Scottish football for the first time in their history, finishing second bottom – despite beating last-placed Queen of the South 6–0 at Palmerston Park in the final match of the season, Killie lost out on goal difference by one solitary goal as Clyde escaped.

In March 1990 McLean played his final game aged 34 against Stenhousemuir, in a 2–1 defeat. He had played his part during the season, as Kilmarnock won promotion back to the second tier at the first time of asking under manager Jim Fleeting, who was only a few months older than McLean himself. He was then appointed as a youth coach at Rugby Park.

Just prior to the end of his playing career, McLean received a testimonial match versus Rangers in January 1990 to recognise his long service at Killie. He started at least twenty matches during every one of his sixteen seasons at the club and was ever-present during the league campaign of 1987–88, playing in all 44 games. McLean had a total of 558 appearances, scoring 21 goals with the East Ayrshire club.

In October 2016 he was inducted into Kilmarnock's Hall of Fame alongside other well-known former players such as Tommy McLean, Ray Montgomerie and James Fowler.

== International career ==
McLean never featured for the Scotland national team, but played once for the Scottish Football League XI in a 1980 match versus League of Ireland XI.

== Personal life ==
McLean has two sons who are involved in football. Steven is a referee who has taken charge of League Cup and Scottish Cup finals. Brian is a footballer who has played for Dundee United, Falkirk, Motherwell and Ross County in Scotland and also had a spell at Preston North End in England.

== See also ==
- List of one-club men in association football
