= Alan Robertson (footballer) =

Scottish footballer & coach (born 1952)

Personal information
- Full name: Alan David Robertson
- Date of birth: 22 September 1952 (age 74)
- Place of birth: Irvine, Scotland
- Position: Left back

Youth career
- Eastercraigs Boys Club

Senior career*
Years	Team	Apps	(Gls)
1971–1972	Troon Juniors		
1971–1988	Kilmarnock	482	(7)

Managerial career
- –1992: Hamilton Academical (youth)
- 1997–2016: Kilmarnock (youth)
- Kilmarnock (U20)
- 2016–2017: BSC Glasgow (U20s Assistant)
- 2017–2022: Bonnyton Thistle
- * Club domestic league appearances and goals

Alan David Robertson (born 22 September 1952) is a Scottish football coach and former player. A one-club man, he made 607 appearances in all competitions (586 in the Scottish League and the two major domestic cups, a club record) for Kilmarnock at left back.

Robertson was appointed manager of West of Scotland Football League side Bonnyton Thistle in 2017; assisted by another former Kilmarnock player, Paul Wright. In May 2021 both Robertson and Wright left the club.
