= Derrick McDicken =

Scottish footballer

Personal information
- Date of birth: 4 April 1955 (age 71)
- Place of birth: Auchinleck, Scotland
- Position: Central defender

Youth career
- Ayr Boswell Boys Club

Senior career*
Years	Team	Apps	(Gls)
1973–1985	Kilmarnock	345	(30)
1985–1986	Clyde	11	(0)
–	Auchinleck Talbot		
Total		356	(30)

International career
1980	Scottish League XI	1	(0)
- * Club domestic league appearances and goals

Derrick McDicken (born 4 April 1955) is a Scottish former footballer who played as a central defender.

McDicken is best known for his time with Kilmarnock where he made 437 appearances in major competitions for the Rugby Park club from 1973 to 1985, before rounding off his career with Clyde then Auchinleck Talbot.
