= Eddie Morrison =

Scottish footballer and manager

Personal information
- Full name: Edward McCallum Morrison
- Date of birth: 22 February 1948
- Place of birth: Gourock, Scotland
- Date of death: 30 May 2011 (aged 63)
- Height: 5 ft 9 in (1.75 m)
- Position: Striker

Youth career
- Port Glasgow

Senior career*
| Years | Team | Apps | (Gls) |
| 1966–1976 | Kilmarnock | 268 | (120) |
| 1976–1978 | Morton | 41 | (8) |
| Total | | 309 | (128) |

Managerial career
- 1985–1989: Kilmarnock
- * Club domestic league appearances and goals

Edward McCallum Morrison (22 February 1948 – 30 May 2011) was a Scottish footballer and manager. Morrison was born in Gourock, and spent the majority of his playing career as a striker at Kilmarnock, where he scored 149 goals in 341 appearances in all competitions. He has been described as a club 'legend'. As of April 2019, Morrison is the club's joint-second league goalscorer of all time, level with Kris Boyd on 121 goals.

Morrison also had a short spell at Morton after leaving Kilmarnock, and later joined the Greenock club's coaching staff. In 1985, he returned to Rugby Park and spent four years as Kilmarnock manager, Killie remaining in the First Division (second tier) throughout.

Morrison died on 30 May 2011, on the flight home from a holiday in Turkey.
