= 1994–95 Kilmarnock F.C. season =

Kilmarnock
1994–95 season
- Chairman: Bobby Fleeting
- Manager: Alex Totten
- Scottish Premier Division: 7th
- Scottish Cup: QF
- Scottish League Cup: 3R
- Top goalscorer: League: Colin McKee 6 All: Steve Maskrey 11
- Highest home attendance: 17,283 (v Rangers, 10 December)
- Lowest home attendance: 7,023 (v Partick Thistle, 22 October)
- Average home league attendance: 9,506 (up 344)

The 1994–95 season was Kilmarnock's 93rd in Scottish League Competitions.

== Scottish Premier Division ==
=== League table ===
Pos	Team	Pld	W	D	L	GF	GA	GD	Pts	Qualification or relegation
5	Falkirk	36	12	12	12	48	47	+1	48	
6	Heart of Midlothian	36	12	7	17	44	51	−7	43	
7	Kilmarnock	36	11	10	15	40	48	−8	43	
8	Partick Thistle	36	10	13	13	40	50	−10	43	Qualification for the Intertoto Cup group stage (Note: Partick Thistle qualified for the 1995 UEFA Intertoto Cup as the highest ranked Scottish club to apply for a place in the competition.)
9	Aberdeen (O)	36	10	11	15	43	46	−3	41	Qualification for the Play-off

Updated to match(es) played on end of season. Source: Soccerbase
Rules for classification: 1) Points; 2) Goal difference; 3) Goals scored
(O) Play-off winners

=== Match results ===
Match Day	Date	Opponent	H/A	Score	Kilmarnock scorer(s)	Attendance
1	13 August	Partick Thistle	A	0–2		7,428
2	20 August	Hibernian	A	0–0		9,101
3	27 August	Motherwell	H	0–1		7,388
4	10 September	Falkirk	H	1–1	Williamson 31'	8,021
5	17 September	Celtic	A	1–1	Williamson 60'	28,457
6	24 September	Heart of Midlothian	A	0–3		9,302
7	1 October	Aberdeen	H	2–1	Winnie 6' o.g., Brown 85'	7,445
8	8 October	Dundee United	H	0–2		7,127
9	15 October	Rangers	A	0–2		44,099
10	22 October	Partick Thistle	H	2–0	McKee 57', Brown 64'	7,023
11	29 October	Motherwell	A	2–3	Henry 12', McKee 40'	7,436
12	5 November	Hibernian	H	0–0		8,319
13	9 November	Falkirk	A	3–3	Skilling 19', Black 21', Weir 32' o.g.	6,127
14	19 November	Celtic	H	0–0		12,602
15	26 November	Heart of Midlothian	H	3–1	Mitchell 60', McKee 73', Skilling 87'	8,029
16	3 December	Aberdeen	A	1–0	Maskrey 1'	10,345
17	10 December	Rangers	H	1–2	McKee 76'	17,283
18	26 December	Dundee United	A	2–2	Bollan 29' o.g., Mitchell 70'	8,468
19	31 December	Partick Thistle	A	2–2	Maskrey 36', MacPherson 63'	7,003
20	7 January	Hibernian	A	1–2	McKee 66'	8,935
21	14 January	Celtic	A	1–2	Black 73' pen.	25,342
22	17 January	Motherwell	H	2–0	Black 8', 42' pen.	7,521
23	21 January	Falkirk	H	2–1	Black 38', McKee 61'	7,648
24	4 February	Aberdeen	H	3–1	Maskrey 27', Brown 34', Roberts 88'	9,384
25	11 February	Heart of Midlothian	A	2–2	Maskrey 5', 18'	8,374
26	25 February	Rangers	A	0–3		44,859
27	4 March	Dundee United	H	2–0	Mitchell 6', 44'	7,630
28	21 March	Celtic	H	0–1		10,112
29	25 March	Falkirk	A	0–2		5,714
30	1 April	Aberdeen	A	1–0	Skilling 50'	14,041
31	12 April	Heart of Midlothian	H	3–2	Anderson 1', Henry 17', Whitworth 60'	7,239
32	15 April	Dundee United	A	2–1	Whitworth 32', Henry 86'	8,723
33	20 April	Rangers	H	0–1		16,086
34	29 April	Partick Thistle	H	0–0		9,201
35	6 May	Motherwell	A	0–2		7,760
36	13 May	Hibernian	H	1–2	Wright 29'	11,676

=== Scottish League Cup ===
Round	Date	Opponent	H/A	Score	Kilmarnock scorer(s)	Attendance
R2	17 August	East Fife	H	4–1	Henry 22', McCluskey 37', Maskrey 46', 55'	4,243
R3	31 August	Raith Rovers	A	2–3	Montgomerie 33', Williamson 80'	4,181

=== Scottish Cup ===
Round	Date	Opponent	H/A	Score	Kilmarnock scorer(s)	Attendance
R3	28 January	Greenock Morton	H	0–0		8,271
R3R	31 January	Greenock Morton	A	2–1(AET)	Maskrey 75', 101'	6,533
4R	18 February	East Fife	H	4–0	Maskrey 23', 56', Reilly 25', Black 66'	7,003
QF	10 March	Celtic	A	0–1		30,873

== See also ==
- List of Kilmarnock F.C. seasons

== Bibliography ==
General

Rollin, Jack (1995). Rothmans Football Yearbook 1995–96. Headline. ISBN 0-7472-7823-7.

Ross, David (2001). Everygame-The New Official History of Kilmarnock Football Club. Kilmarnock Football Club. ISBN 0-9541653-0-6.

Thomson, David C. (1995). The Tartan Special Scottish Football League Review 1995-96. Programme Publications. ISBN 0-86108-965-0.
