= 1993–94 Kilmarnock F.C. season =

Kilmarnock
1993–94 season
- Chairman: Bobby Fleeting
- Manager: Tommy Burns (footballer)
- Scottish Premier Division: 8th
- Scottish Cup: SF
- Scottish League Cup: 2R
- Top goalscorer: League: Bobby Williamson 7 All: Bobby Williamson 8
- Highest home attendance: 19,162 (v Rangers, 6 November)
- Lowest home attendance: 5,670 (v St Johnstone, 11 September)
- Average home league attendance: 9,162 (up 4,537)

The 1993–94 season was Kilmarnock's 92nd in Scottish League Competitions.

== Scottish Premier Division ==
=== League table ===
| Pos | Team | Pld | W | D | L | GF | GA | GD | Pts | Qualification or relegation |
|---|---|---|---|---|---|---|---|---|---|---|
| 6 | Dundee United | 44 | 11 | 20 | 13 | 47 | 48 | −1 | 42 | Qualification for the Cup Winners' Cup first round |
| 7 | Heart of Midlothian | 44 | 11 | 20 | 13 | 37 | 43 | −6 | 42 | |
| 8 | Kilmarnock | 44 | 12 | 16 | 16 | 36 | 45 | −9 | 40 | |
| 9 | Partick Thistle | 44 | 12 | 16 | 16 | 46 | 57 | −11 | 40 | |
| 10 | St Johnstone (R) | 44 | 10 | 20 | 14 | 35 | 47 | −12 | 40 | Relegation to the 1994–95 Scottish First Division |

Source: RSSSF
Rules for classification: 1) points; 2) goal difference; 3) number of goals scored.
(R) Relegated

=== Match results ===
| Match Day | Date | Opponent | H/A | Score | Kilmarnock scorer(s) | Attendance |
|---|---|---|---|---|---|---|
| 1 | 7 August | Dundee | H | 1–0 | Brown 59' | 8,162 |
| 2 | 14 August | Aberdeen | A | 0–1 | | 13,534 |
| 3 | 21 August | Motherwell | H | 0–1 | | 7,555 |
| 4 | 28 August | Rangers | A | 2–1 | Roberts 62', Williamson 90' | 44,243 |
| 5 | 4 September | Hibernian | H | 1–1 | McCluskey 68' | 7,727 |
| 6 | 11 September | St Johnstone | H | 0–0 | | 5,670 |
| 7 | 18 September | Heart of Midlothian | A | 1–0 | Skilling 32' | 8,309 |
| 8 | 25 September | Partick Thistle | H | 3–1 | Black 19' pen., McCluskey 47', Williamson 72' | 7,411 |
| 9 | 2 October | Celtic | A | 0–0 | | 23,396 |
| 10 | 5 October | Dundee United | H | 1–1 | Roberts 53' | 7,034 |
| 11 | 9 October | Raith Rovers | A | 2–2 | Williamson 72', Mitchell 75' | 4,754 |
| 12 | 16 October | Aberdeen | H | 1–1 | Mitchell 76' | 9,108 |
| 13 | 23 October | Dundee | A | 0–1 | | 4,537 |
| 14 | 30 October | Motherwell | A | 2–2 | Mitchell 45', Porteous 51' | 7,384 |
| 15 | 6 November | Rangers | H | 0–2 | | 19,162 |
| 16 | 9 November | Hibernian | A | 1–2 | Brown 20' | 6,441 |
| 17 | 13 November | Celtic | H | 2–2 | Williamson 21', Skilling 89' | 16,649 |
| 18 | 20 November | Partick Thistle | A | 1–0 | Crainie 82' | 6,437 |
| 19 | 27 November | St Johnstone | A | 1–0 | Williamson 27' | 4,576 |
| 20 | 30 November | Heart of Midlothian | H | 0–0 | | 6,948 |
| 21 | 4 December | Dundee United | A | 0–0 | | 7,100 |
| 22 | 11 December | Raith Rovers | H | 1–0 | Brown 24' | 6,012 |
| 23 | 18 December | Aberdeen | A | 1–3 | Skilling 84' | 10,834 |
| 24 | 1 January | Motherwell | H | 0–0 | | 10,511 |
| 25 | 4 January | Dundee | H | 1–0 | McSkimming 47' | 7,406 |
| 26 | 8 January | Rangers | A | 0–3 | | 44,919 |
| 27 | 15 January | Hibernian | H | 0–3 | | 7,358 |
| 28 | 22 January | Heart of Midlothian | A | 1–1 | MacPherson 43' | 9,204 |
| 29 | 5 February | St Johnstone | H | 0–0 | | 6,345 |
| 30 | 12 February | Partick Thistle | H | 1–2 | Mitchell 43' | 7,511 |
| 31 | 1 March | Celtic | A | 0–1 | | 10,882 |
| 32 | 5 March | Dundee United | H | 1–1 | Brown 80' | 7,403 |
| 33 | 15 March | Raith Rovers | A | 2–3 | McSkimming 51', Mitchell 53' | 3,585 |
| 34 | 19 March | Aberdeen | H | 2–3 | Black 63', McCloy 87' | 8,544 |
| 35 | 26 March | Dundee | A | 0–3 | | 3,485 |
| 36 | 30 March | St Johnstone | A | 1–0 | MacPherson 2' | 5,513 |
| 37 | 2 April | Heart of Midlothian | H | 0–1 | | 8,022 |
| 38 | 16 April | Celtic | H | 2–0 | Black 65' pen., Brown 90' | 11,576 |
| 39 | 19 April | Partick Thistle | A | 0–1 | | 7,299 |
| 40 | 23 April | Raith Rovers | H | 0–0 | | 7,426 |
| 41 | 26 April | Dundee United | A | 3–1 | Williamson 12', 88', McSkimming 54' | 8,801 |
| 42 | 30 April | Motherwell | A | 0–1 | | 8,185 |
| 43 | 7 May | Rangers | H | 1–0 | Black 80' | 18,012 |
| 44 | 14 May | Hibernian | A | 0–0 | | 9,975 |

=== Scottish League Cup ===
| Round | Date | Opponent | H/A | Score | Kilmarnock scorer(s) | Attendance |
|---|---|---|---|---|---|---|
| R2 | 10 August | Greenock Morton | H | 1–2 | Mitchell 15' | 5,118 |

=== Scottish Cup ===
| Round | Date | Opponent | H/A | Score | Kilmarnock scorer(s) | Attendance |
|---|---|---|---|---|---|---|
| R3 | 29 January | Ayr United | H | 2–1 | McSkimming 10', Black 59' pen. | 12,856 |
| R4 | 19 February | Greenock Morton | A | 1–0 | Williamson 18' | 7,255 |
| QF | 12 March | Dundee | H | 1–0 | Brown 40' | 10,446 |
| SF | 10 April | Rangers | N | 0–0 | | 35,134 |
| SF | 13 April | Rangers | N | 1–2 | Black 17' | 29,860 |

== See also ==
- List of Kilmarnock F.C. seasons
