= 1991–92 Kilmarnock F.C. season =

Kilmarnock
1991–92 season
- Chairman: Bobby Fleeting
- Manager: Jim Fleeting until April 1992; Tommy Burns from May 1992
- Scottish First Division: 4th
- Scottish Cup: 3R
- Scottish League Cup: 3R
- Scottish Challenge Cup: 2R
- Top goalscorer: League: Ally Mitchell & Calum Campbell (10); All: Ally Mitchell & Calum Campbell (11)
- Highest home attendance: 8,380 (v Ayr United, 31 August)
- Lowest home attendance: 2,094 (v Clydebank, 7 April)
- Average home league attendance: 4,387 (down 547)

The 1991–92 season was Kilmarnock's 90th in Scottish League Competitions. They competed in the Scottish First division, Scottish FA Cup, League Cup and Challenge Cup.

== Season overview ==
Kilmarnock started their league campaign on 10 August 1991 at home against Stirling Albion where the game finished a scoreless draw. Over the next eight games they only recorded one win against Meadowbank Thistle. Into September Kilmarnock form picked up with four wins on the bounce. This form continued into November with a notable 4–2 home win against Forfar Athletic, with two goals from Ross Jack and two from Ally Mitchell. Wins, draws and a few losses from November into December and the start of January. On 7 January 1992 the Kils hosted Montrose where they had a comfortable 5–1 win. After that game Kilmarnock then lost three games in a row. After the February break Kilmarnock won eight of their next 12 games allowing them to finish in 4th place. They narrowly missed out on promotion to the top-tier Premier Division.

There wasn't much success in the cups this season. In the League Cup Kilmarnock won away at Cowdenbeath but lost in the next round to Hibernian. In the FA Cup they played two games against Meadowbank Thistle, the first being a draw that required a reply. The reply went to extra time and then penalties only for Kilmarnock to get kicked out of the competition 4–3 on pens.

Kilmarnock were drawn away to Greenock Morton in the Challenge Cup. After extra time they were kicked out of the competition after the game finished 2–1 in Greenock Morton's favour.

== Squad ==
Note: Flags indicate national team as defined under FIFA eligibility rules; some limited exceptions apply. Players may hold more than one non-FIFA nationality.

| No. | Pos. | Nation | Player |
|---|---|---|---|
| — | DF | SCO | Ray Montgomerie |
| — | DF | SCO | Calum Campbell |
| — | DF | SCO | Gus MacPherson |
| — | DF | SCO | Tom Black |
| — | DF | SCO | Hugh Burns |

| No. | Pos. | Nation | Player |
|---|---|---|---|
| — | MF | SCO | Ally Mitchell |
| — | MF | SCO | Tommy Burns |
| — | MF | SCO | Shaun McSkimming |
| — | FW | SCO | Bobby Williamson |

== Competitions ==
=== Scottish First Division ===
==== Table ====
| Pos | Team | Pld | W | D | L | GF | GA | GD | Pts | Promotion or relegation |
|---|---|---|---|---|---|---|---|---|---|---|
| 2 | Partick Thistle (P) | 44 | 23 | 11 | 10 | 62 | 36 | +26 | 57 | Promotion to the Premier Division |
| 3 | Hamilton Academical | 44 | 22 | 13 | 9 | 72 | 48 | +24 | 57 | |
| 4 | Kilmarnock | 44 | 21 | 12 | 11 | 59 | 37 | +22 | 54 | |
| 5 | Raith Rovers | 44 | 21 | 11 | 12 | 59 | 42 | +17 | 53 | |
| 6 | Ayr United | 44 | 18 | 11 | 15 | 63 | 55 | +8 | 47 | |

Source: RSSSF and statto
Rules for classification: 1) points; 2) goal difference; 3) number of goals scored.
(P) Promoted

==== Results ====
| Match Day | Date | Opponent | H/A | Score | Kilmarnock scorer(s) | Attendance |
|---|---|---|---|---|---|---|
| 1 | 10 August | Stirling Albion | H | 0–0 | | 4,416 |
| 2 | 13 August | Hamilton Academical | H | 1–2 | McSkimming 25' | 4,347 |
| 3 | 17 August | Partick Thistle | A | 0–1 | | 5,537 |
| 4 | 24 August | Meadowbank Thistle | A | 3–2 | Williamson 40', 85' pen., Mitchell 73' | 1,222 |
| 5 | 31 August | Ayr United | H | 1–1 | Montgomerie 76' | 8,380 |
| 6 | 7 September | Clydebank | A | 1–1 | Campbell 39' | 2,576 |
| 7 | 14 September | Montrose | H | 0–0 | | 3,478 |
| 8 | 21 September | Dundee | A | 1–2 | Williamson 17' | 1,299 |
| 9 | 28 September | Raith Rovers | H | 1–0 | Campbell 2' | 3,385 |
| 10 | 5 October | Forfar Athletic | A | 1–0 | Mitchell 51' | 1,019 |
| 11 | 8 October | Greenock Morton | H | 1–0 | Campbell 12' | 3,677 |
| 12 | 12 October | Stirling Albion | A | 3–0 | Mitchell 40', MacPherson 43', Williamson 63' | 2,065 |
| 13 | 19 October | Partick Thistle | H | 2–3 | Williamson 22', Campbell 35' | 4,962 |
| 14 | 26 October | Clydebank | H | 2–1 | T.Burns 10', Campbell 57' | 2,231 |
| 15 | 29 October | Montrose | A | 2–2 | Jack 13', Mitchell 66' | 1,074 |
| 16 | 2 November | Ayr United | A | 3–0 | T.Burns 13', Mitchell 19', Williamson 44' | 6,064 |
| 17 | 9 November | Meadowbank Thistle | H | 1–0 | MacPherson 65' | 3,828 |
| 18 | 16 November | Forfar Athletic | H | 4–2 | Jack 5', 57', Mitchell 39', 44' | 3,560 |
| 19 | 19 November | Greenock Morton | A | 1–0 | Jack 53' | 2,637 |
| 20 | 23 November | Dundee | H | 1–2 | Mitchell 8' | 7,137 |
| 21 | 30 November | Hamilton Academical | A | 2–2 | H.Burns 10', Williamson 46' | 3,893 |
| 22 | 3 December | Raith Rovers | A | 1–1 | Williamson 88' | 2,280 |
| 23 | 7 December | Stirling Albion | H | 2–0 | Williamson 69' pen., H.Burns 87' | 3,796 |
| 24 | 14 December | Clydebank | A | 3–0 | H.Burns 21', Mitchell 31', Campbell 85' | 2,357 |
| 25 | 28 December | Meadowbank Thistle | A | 0–1 | | 1,505 |
| 26 | 1 January | Ayr United | H | 1–1 | Campbell 50' | 8,211 |
| 27 | 4 January | Forfar Athletic | A | 0–0 | | 1,185 |
| 28 | 7 January | Montrose | H | 5–1 | Black 22' pen., Campbell 28', 81', Jack 43', Jack 53', Dornan 65' o.g. | 3,183 |
| 29 | 11 January | Greenock Morton | H | 0–1 | | 4,988 |
| 30 | 18 January | Hamilton Academical | H | 0–2 | | 4,662 |
| 31 | 1 February | Partick Thistle | A | 1–2 | Black 76' | 4,483 |
| 32 | 8 February | Dundee | A | 1–1 | Jack 28' | 5,988 |
| 33 | 26 February | Raith Rovers | H | 1–0 | MacPherson 65' | 3,657 |
| 34 | 29 February | Forfar Athletic | H | 2–0 | H.Burns 74', Campbell 83' | 3,076 |
| 35 | 14 March | Meadowbank Thistle | H | 2–1 | Tait 58', Jack 65' | 2,884 |
| 36 | 21 March | Ayr United | A | 2–0 | Tait 47', T.Burns 86' | 5,530 |
| 37 | 24 March | Greenock Morton | A | 0–0 | | 3,015 |
| 38 | 28 March | Stirling Albion | A | 0–1 | | 2,083 |
| 39 | 4 April | Partick Thistle | H | 1–3 | Black 46' pen. | 5,640 |
| 40 | 7 April | Clydebank | H | 1–0 | Mitchell 31' | 2,094 |
| 41 | 11 April | Montrose | A | 1–0 | McGachie 55' o.g. | 793 |
| 42 | 18 April | Dundee | H | 2–0 | Jamieson 30' o.g., Tait 79' | 4,933 |
| 43 | 25 April | Hamilton Academical | A | 1–0 | Jack 34' | 3,449 |
| 44 | 2 May | Raith Rovers | A | 1–1 | Porteous 75' | 1,960 |

=== Scottish League Cup ===
| Round | Date | Opponent | H/A | Score | Kilmarnock scorer(s) | Attendance |
|---|---|---|---|---|---|---|
| R2 | 26 August | Cowdenbeath | A | 1–0 | Williamson 51' | 4,777 |
| R3 | 28 August | Hibernian | H | 2–3 | Campbell 19', McSkimming 69' | 32,671 |

=== Scottish Cup ===
Results

| Round | Date | Opponent | H/A | Score | Kilmarnock scorer(s) | Attendance |
|---|---|---|---|---|---|---|
| R3 | 25 January | Meadowbank Thistle | A | 1–1 | Mitchell 85' | 2,301 |
| R3R | 4 February | Meadowbank Thistle | H | 1–1(AET, lost 3–4 on pens) | H.Burns 75' | 4,694 |

=== Scottish Challenge Cup ===
Results

| Round | Date | Opponent | H/A | Score | Kilmarnock Scorer(s) | Attendance |
|---|---|---|---|---|---|---|
| R2 | 15 October | Greenock Morton | A | 1–2(AET) | H.Burns 40' | 2,864 |

== See also ==
- List of Kilmarnock F.C. seasons
