= 1995–96 Kilmarnock F.C. season =

Kilmarnock
1995–96 season
- Chairman: Bobby Fleeting (until 15 March); Jim Moffat
- Manager: Alex Totten
- Stadium: Rugby Park
- Scottish Premier Division: 7th
- Scottish League Cup: Third round
- Scottish Cup: Fourth round
- Top goalscorer: League: Paul Wright (13); All: Paul Wright (16)
- Highest home attendance: 17,056 vs. Rangers, Premier Division, 4 May
- Lowest home attendance: 6,017 vs. Falkirk, Premier Division, 9 December
- Average home league attendance: 8,719
Home colours	Away colours

The 1995–96 season was Kilmarnock's third season in the Scottish Premier Division before the formation of the Scottish Premier League in 1998. Kilmarnock also competed in the Scottish Cup and the League Cup.

== Summary ==
=== Season ===
Kilmarnock finished seventh in the Scottish Premier Division with 41 points. They also reached the third round of the League Cup, losing to Dundee, and the fourth round of the Scottish Cup, losing to Heart of Midlothian

== Results and fixtures ==
=== Scottish Premier Division ===
Match Day	Date	Opponent	H/A	Score	Kilmarnock scorer(s)	Attendance
1	26 August 1995	Rangers	A	0–1		44,686
2	9 September 1995	Hibernian	H	0–3		7,014
3	16 September 1995	Raith Rovers	A	0–2		4,441
4	23 September 1995	Aberdeen	H	1–2	Brown 85'	7,198
5	30 September 1995	Motherwell	A	0–3		6,356
6	4 October 1995	Partick Thistle	A	1–1	Watson 42' o.g.	4,000
7	7 October 1995	Heart of Midlothian	H	3–1	Brown 44', McKee 45', 62'	6,721
8	14 October 1995	Falkirk	A	2–0	Mitchell 3', Wright 44'	4,878
9	21 October 1995	Celtic	H	0–0		14,011
10	28 October 1995	Hibernian	A	0–2		10,400
11	4 November 1995	Raith Rovers	H	5–1	Henry 9', 42', Wright 54', 67', Brown 62'	6,440
12	8 November 1995	Rangers	H	0–2		14,823
13	11 November 1995	Heart of Midlothian	A	1–2	McKee 85'	10,442
14	18 November 1995	Motherwell	H	1–1	Mitchell 24'	6,608
15	2 December 1995	Celtic	A	2–4	Mitchell 11', Brown 22'	33,812
16	9 December 1995	Falkirk	H	4–0	Brown 24', 27', Black 46' pen., MacPherson 63'	6,017
17	13 December 1995	Aberdeen	A	1–4	Wright 22'	14,060
18	16 December 1995	Partick Thistle	H	2–1	Wright 30', 65'	6,581
19	26 December 1995	Rangers	A	0–3		45,173
20	6 January 1996	Raith Rovers	A	1–1	Black 87' pen.	4,781
21	13 January 1996	Hibernian	H	3–2	Maskrey 57', Wright 63', Henry 90'	6,686
22	16 January 1996	Motherwell	A	1–0	Wright 59'	5,781
23	20 January 1996	Celtic	H	0–0		15,716
24	23 January 1996	Aberdeen	H	1–1	Wright 82'	6,703
25	3 February 1996	Falkirk	A	2–4	Wright 7', 10'	8,374
26	10 February 1996	Partick Thistle	A	1–0	Black 5' pen.	4,800
27	24 February 1996	Heart of Midlothian	H	0–2		8,022
28	2 March 1996	Aberdeen	A	0–3		7,000
29	16 March 1996	Motherwell	H	0–1		7,035
30	23 March 1996	Raith Rovers	H	2–0	McKee 67', Wright 75'	6,143
31	30 March 1996	Hibernian	A	1–1	Wright 76'	8,102
32	10 April 1996	Celtic	A	1–1	McIntyre 45'	36,372
33	13 April 1996	Falkirk	H	1–0	McIntyre 54'	6,505
34	20 April 1996	Partick Thistle	H	2–1	Skilling 63', Black 84' pen.	7,276
35	27 April 1996	Heart of Midlothian	A	0–1		11,329
36	4 May 1996	Rangers	H	0–3		17,056

=== Scottish League Cup ===
Round	Date	Opponent	H/A	Score	Kilmarnock scorer(s)	Attendance
Second round	19 August 1995	Dumbarton	H	1–0(AET)	Roberts 115'	4,991
Third round	30 August 1995	Dundee	A	1–3	Wright 33'	4,130

=== Scottish Cup ===
Round	Date	Opponent	H/A	Score	Kilmarnock scorer(s)	Attendance
Third round	27 January 1996	Hibernian	A	2–0	Wright 54', 63'	8,350
Fourth round	17 February 1996	Heart of Midlothian	H	1–2	Anderson 67'	15,173

=== Ayrshire Cup ===
Match	Date	Opponent	Venue	Result	Attendance	Scorers
Final	6 May 1996	Ayr United	H	1–0		

== Final league table ==
Pos	Team	Pld	W	D	L	GF	GA	GD	Pts	Qualification or relegation
5	Hibernian	36	11	10	15	43	57	−14	43	
6	Raith Rovers	36	12	7	17	41	57	−16	43	
7	Kilmarnock	36	11	8	17	39	54	−15	41	
8	Motherwell	36	9	12	15	28	39	−11	39	
9	Partick Thistle (R)	36	8	6	22	29	62	−33	30	Qualification for the Play-off

Source: Soccerbase
Rules for classification: 1) Points; 2) Goal difference; 3) Goals scored
(R) Relegated

== See also ==
- List of Kilmarnock F.C. seasons

General

Rollin, Jack (1996). Rothmans Football Yearbook 1996-97. Headline. ISBN 0-7472-7781-8.

Ross, David (2001). Everygame-The New Official History of Kilmarnock Football Club. Kilmarnock Football Club. ISBN 0-9541653-0-6.

Thomson, David C. (1995). The Tartan Special Scottish Football League Review 1995-96. Programme Publications. ISBN 0-86108-965-0.

Thomson, David C. (1996). Tennent's Lager Scottish Football League Review 1996-97. Programme Publications. ISBN 0-9529157-1-5.

Specific
