= 1992–93 Kilmarnock F.C. season =

Kilmarnock
1992–93 season
- Chairman: Bobby Fleeting
- Manager: Tommy Burns (footballer)
- Scottish First Division: 2nd
- Scottish Cup: 4R
- Scottish League Cup: QF
- Scottish Challenge Cup: QF
- Top goalscorer: League: George McCluskey 11; All: George McCluskey 15
- Highest home attendance: 12,830 (v Hamilton Academical, 15 May)
- Lowest home attendance: 2,798 (v Cowdenbeath, 26 September)
- Average home league attendance: 4,625 (up 238)

The 1992–93 season was Kilmarnock's 91st in Scottish League Competitions. They finished in 2nd place and were promoted to the Scottish Premier Division.

== Scottish First Division ==
=== League table ===
| Pos | Team | Pld | W | D | L | GF | GA | GD | Pts | Promotion or relegation |
|---|---|---|---|---|---|---|---|---|---|---|
| 1 | Raith Rovers (C, P) | 44 | 25 | 15 | 4 | 85 | 41 | +44 | 65 | Promotion to the Premier Division |
| 2 | Kilmarnock (P) | 44 | 21 | 12 | 11 | 67 | 40 | +27 | 54 | Promotion to the Premier Division |
| 3 | Dunfermline Athletic | 44 | 22 | 8 | 14 | 64 | 47 | +17 | 52 | |
| 4 | St Mirren | 44 | 21 | 9 | 14 | 62 | 52 | +10 | 51 | |
| 5 | Hamilton Academical | 44 | 19 | 12 | 13 | 65 | 45 | +20 | 50 | |

Source: RSSSF and statto
Rules for classification: 1) points; 2) goal difference; 3) number of goals scored.
(C) Champions; (P) Promoted

=== Match results ===
| Match Day | Date | Opponent | H/A | Score | Kilmarnock scorer(s) | Attendance |
|---|---|---|---|---|---|---|
| 1 | 1 August | Greenock Morton | A | 2–0 | Mitchell 24', Jack 37' | 3,274 |
| 2 | 4 August | Dumbarton | A | 3–1 | Paterson 4', Jack 13', Tait 75' | 2,109 |
| 3 | 8 August | Raith Rovers | H | 1–1 | Mitchell 75' | 4,566 |
| 4 | 15 August | Dunfermline Athletic | H | 0–1 | | 5,511 |
| 5 | 22 August | Ayr United | A | 0–2 | | 5,475 |
| 6 | 29 August | Meadowbank Thistle | H | 1–0 | Campbell 46' | 2,821 |
| 7 | 5 September | Clydebank | A | 1–1 | Williamson 45' | 2,216 |
| 8 | 12 September | Stirling Albion | A | 1–0 | Jack 2' | 1,441 |
| 9 | 19 September | St Mirren | H | 1–2 | Williamson 86' pen. | 5,291 |
| 10 | 26 September | Cowdenbeath | H | 3–0 | Williamson 15', Porteous 66', Jack 90' | 2,798 |
| 11 | 3 October | Hamilton Academical | A | 1–1 | Skilling 69' | 2,863 |
| 12 | 10 October | Greenock Morton | H | 3–0 | T.Burns 27', 82', McCluskey 73' | 3,991 |
| 13 | 17 October | Raith Rovers | A | 1–1 | Reilly 50' pen. | 3,718 |
| 14 | 24 October | Clydebank | H | 3–3 | McCluskey 33', 76', McSkimming 60' | 3,582 |
| 15 | 31 October | Meadowbank Thistle | A | 1–1 | McSkimming 8' | 1,104 |
| 16 | 7 November | Dunfermline Athletic | A | 0–2 | | 3,924 |
| 17 | 14 November | Ayr United | H | 3–0 | McCluskey 3', Skilling 25', Traynor 55' o.g. | 5,709 |
| 18 | 21 November | St Mirren | A | 1–0 | Black 31' pen. | 4,686 |
| 19 | 28 November | Stirling Albion | H | 1–0 | Skilling 14' | 3,526 |
| 20 | 1 December | Hamilton Academical | H | 1–0 | MacPherson 45' | 3,711 |
| 21 | 5 December | Cowdenbeath | A | 3–2 | Jack 22', Reilly 61' pen., MacPherson 72' | 1,176 |
| 22 | 19 December | Dumbarton | H | 1–0 | Campbell 55' | 3,591 |
| 23 | 26 December | Dunfermline Athletic | H | 2–3 | Stark 22', Reilly 70' | 5,762 |
| 24 | 29 December | Greenock Morton | A | 0–2 | | 2,822 |
| 25 | 2 January | Ayr United | A | 1–0 | Porteous 46' | 8,424 |
| 26 | 16 January | Meadowbank Thistle | H | 5–0 | Williamson 22', McCluskey 26', 43', MacPherson 37', Porteous 50' | 3,366 |
| 27 | 27 January | Hamilton Academical | A | 2–1 | Williamson 9', Porteous 44' | 3,106 |
| 28 | 30 January | Raith Rovers | H | 3–0 | Porteous 67', 82', Stark 80' | 7,003 |
| 29 | 13 February | Dumbarton | A | 0–1 | | 2,346 |
| 30 | 16 February | Clydebank | A | 0–2 | | 2,107 |
| 31 | 20 February | Cowdenbeath | H | 1–1 | Campbell 90' | 2,928 |
| 32 | 27 February | St Mirren | H | 1–0 | McCluskey 77' | 6,555 |
| 33 | 6 March | Stirling Albion | A | 0–2 | | 1,386 |
| 34 | 9 March | Greenock Morton | H | 2–2 | Doak 18' o.g., Williamson 57' | 3,407 |
| 35 | 13 March | Raith Rovers | A | 0–2 | | 4,738 |
| 36 | 20 March | Ayr United | H | 1–1 | Skilling 45' | 5,660 |
| 37 | 27 March | Dunfermline Athletic | A | 2–2 | Campbell 53', McSkimming 65' | 5,224 |
| 38 | 3 April | Clydebank | H | 6–0 | McSkimming 2', McCluskey 3', 45', MacPherson 42' pen., Mitchell 78', 80' | 3,005 |
| 39 | 14 April | Meadowbank Thistle | A | 1–1 | McSkimming 1' | 1,493 |
| 40 | 17 April | Stirling Albion | H | 3–0 | McCluskey 6', Mitchell 74', McCarrison 86' | 3,852 |
| 41 | 24 April | St Mirren | A | 1–2 | Mitchell 43' | 8,102 |
| 42 | 1 May | Dumbarton | H | 1–0 | McCluskey 8' | 3,793 |
| 43 | 8 May | Cowdenbeath | A | 3–0 | Stark 4', Crainie 57', MacPherson 60' | 2,750 |
| 44 | 15 May | Hamilton Academical | H | 0–0 | | 12,830 |

== Scottish League Cup ==
| Round | Date | Opponent | H/A | Score | Kilmarnock scorer(s) | Attendance |
|---|---|---|---|---|---|---|
| R2 | 11 August | Greenock Morton | A | 3–2(AET) | Jack 64', T.Burns 113', 119' | 3,453 |
| R3 | 18 August | Hibernian | H | 3–1(AET) | McSkimming 40', McCluskey 91', Jack 95' | 7,495 |
| QF | 25 August | St Johnstone | H | 1–3 | Campbell 79' | 8,293 |

== Scottish Cup ==
| Round | Date | Opponent | H/A | Score | Kilmarnock scorer(s) | Attendance |
|---|---|---|---|---|---|---|
| R3 | 9 January | Raith Rovers | H | 5–0 | Williamson 16', 61', 77', McCluskey 29', MacPherson 73' | 7,309 |
| R4 | 6 February | St Johnstone | H | 0–0 | | 9,278 |
| R4R | 10 February | St Johnstone | A | 0–1(AET) | | 7,144 |

== Scottish Challenge Cup ==
| Match day | Date | Opponent | H/A | Score | Kilmarnock Scorer(s) | Attendance |
|---|---|---|---|---|---|---|
| R1 | 29 September | Clyde | H | 2–1 | McCluskey 31', Mitchell 40' | 2,686 |
| R2 | 20 October | Ayr United | H | 1–0 | McCluskey 18' | 7,122 |
| QF | 28 October | Greenock Morton | H | 1–2 | T.Burns 58' | 4,956 |

== See also ==
- List of Kilmarnock F.C. seasons
