= 1980–81 Kilmarnock F.C. season =

Kilmarnock
1980–81 season
- Chairman: Tom Lauchlan
- Manager: Davie Sneddon until January 1981 Jim Clunie from January 1981
- Scottish Football League Premier Division: 9th
- Scottish Cup: R4R
- Scottish League Cup: R3
- Top goalscorer: League: John Bourke 5 All: John Bourke, Gordon Cramond 7
- Highest home attendance: 15,021 (v Rangers, 20 September)
- Lowest home attendance: 973 (v Greenock Morton, 15 April)
- Average home league attendance: 4,507 (down 2,467)

The 1980–81 season was Kilmarnock's 79th in Scottish League Competitions.

== Scottish Premier Division ==
=== League table ===
Pos	Team	Pld	W	D	L	GF	GA	GD	Pts	Qualification or relegation
6	Partick Thistle	36	10	10	16	32	48	−16	30	
7	Airdrieonians	36	10	9	17	36	55	−19	29	
8	Morton	36	10	8	18	36	58	−22	28	
9	Kilmarnock (R)	36	5	9	22	23	65	−42	19	Relegation to the 1981–82 Scottish First Division
10	Heart of Midlothian (R)	36	6	6	24	27	71	−44	18	Relegation to the 1981–82 Scottish First Division

Source: Statto
Rules for classification: 1) points; 2) goal difference; 3) number of goals scored.
(R) Relegated

=== Match results ===
Match Day	Date	Opponent	H/A	Score	Kilmarnock scorer(s)	Attendance
1	9 August	Dundee United	A	2–2	Street 49', Mauchlen 67'	5,788
2	16 August	Celtic	H	0–3		13,810
3	23 August	Partick Thistle	A	1–0	McBride 70'	3,197
4	6 September	Heart of Midlothian	H	0–1		3,995
5	13 September	Greenock Morton	A	0–2		3,049
6	20 September	Rangers	H	1–8	Bourke 14'	15,023
7	27 September	Airdrieonians	A	0–1		2,736
8	4 October	St Mirren	H	1–6	Cramond 66'	3,897
9	11 October	Aberdeen	A	0–2		11,164
10	18 October	Dundee United	H	0–1		2,719
11	25 October	Celtic	A	1–4	Cramond 13'	16,537
12	1 November	Partick Thistle	H	0–1		2,417
13	8 November	Airdrieonians	H	1–1	Houston 25'	2,230
14	15 November	Rangers	A	0–2		15,791
15	22 November	Aberdeen	H	1–1	Street 35'	3,319
16	29 November	St Mirren	A	0–2		5,300
17	6 December	Heart of Midlothian	A	0–2		5,183
18	13 December	Greenock Morton	H	3–3	Armstrong 16', Bourke 19', Hughes 70'	2,483
19	20 December	Rangers	H	1–1	Bourke 23'	9,172
20	1 January	Celtic	H	1–2	Hughes 2'	7,625
21	3 January	Dundee United	A	0–7		6,474
22	10 January	St Mirren	H	2–0	Mauchlen 39', Doherty 77'	4,385
23	31 January	Greenock Morton	A	0–1		3,497
24	21 February	Partick Thistle	A	1–1	Bourke 43'	1,601
25	28 February	Dundee United	H	0–1		2,102
26	7 March	St Mirren	A	1–1	Bourke 89'	4,203
27	11 March	Airdrieonians	A	0–3		2,084
28	14 March	Aberdeen	H	1–0	Doherty 59'	2,415
29	21 March	Rangers	A	0–2		8,488
30	24 March	Heart of Midlothian	H	2–0	Mauchlen 44', McLean 80'	1,445
31	28 March	Airdrieonians	H	0–1		1,849
32	4 April	Heart of Midlothian	A	0–1		1,866
33	15 April	Greenock Morton	H	0–0		973
34	18 April	Partick Thistle	H	0–1		1,262
35	25 April	Celtic	A	1–1	Eadie 63'	23,050
36	2 May	Aberdeen	A	2–0	McDicken 53', McCready 56'	7,002

== Scottish League Cup ==
Round	Date	Opponent	H/A	Score	Kilmarnock scorer(s)	Attendance
R1 L1	13 August	Airdrieonians	H	1–0	Cramond 41'	2,986
R1 L2	20 August	Airdrieonians	A	1–0	Cramond 59'	2,983
R2 L1	27 August	Dunfermline Athletic	H	0–0		2,273
R2 L2	30 August	Dunfermline Athletic	A	2–1	Clarke 10', McBride 74'	3,084
R3 L1	3 September	Dundee	A	0–0		4,388
R3 L2	24 September	Dundee	H	0–0(AET, lost 3–5 on pens)		2,401

== Scottish Cup ==
Round	Date	Opponent	H/A	Score	Kilmarnock scorer(s)	Attendance
R3	24 January	Ayr United	H	2–1	McDicken 2', Hughes 70'	8,185
R4	14 February	Clydebank	H	0–0		3,741
R4R	17 February	Clydebank	A	1–1(AET)	Bourke 34'	3,400
R42R	23 February	Clydebank	N	0–1		2,340

=== Anglo-Scottish Cup ===
Round	Date	Opponent	H/A	Score	Kilmarnock scorer(s)	Attendance
R1 L1	30 July	East Stirlingshire	H	1–3	Mauchlen 85'	1,563
R1 L2	6 August	East Stirlingshire	A	3–0	McDicken 60', Cairney 64', Houston 74'	1,000
QF L1	9 September	Blackpool	A	1–2	Cramond 80'	4,904
QF L2	14 September	Blackpool	H	4–2	Cramond 5', 27', Bourke 20', Maxwell 45'	2,656
SF L1	4 November	Notts County	H	1–2	McBride 14'	2,865
SF L2	18 November	Notts County	A	2–5	Street 60', McBride 79'	4,314

== See also ==
- List of Kilmarnock F.C. seasons
