= 1979–80 Kilmarnock F.C. season =

Kilmarnock
1979–80 season
- Chairman: Tom Lauchlan
- Manager: Davie Sneddon
- Scottish Football League Premier Division: 8th
- Scottish Cup: R3
- Scottish League Cup: QF
- Top goalscorer: League: Bobby Street 9 All: Bobby Street 12
- Highest home attendance: 16,918 (v Celtic, 3 November)
- Lowest home attendance: 3,533 (v Aberdeen, 19 April)
- Average home league attendance: 6,973 (up 3,940)

The 1979–80 season was Kilmarnock's 78th in Scottish League Competitions.

== Scottish Premier Division ==
=== League table ===
Pos	Team	Pld	W	D	L	GF	GA	GD	Pts	Qualification or relegation
6	Morton	36	14	8	14	51	46	+5	36	
7	Partick Thistle	36	11	14	11	43	47	−4	36	
8	Kilmarnock	36	11	11	14	36	52	−16	33	
9	Dundee (R)	36	10	6	20	47	73	−26	26	Relegation to the 1980–81 Scottish First Division
10	Hibernian (R)	36	6	6	24	29	67	−38	18	Relegation to the 1980–81 Scottish First Division

Source: Statto and RSSSF
Rules for classification: 1) points; 2) goal difference; 3) number of goals scored.
(R) Relegated

=== Match results ===
Match Day	Date	Opponent	H/A	Score	Kilmarnock scorer(s)	Attendance
1	11 August	St Mirren	A	2–2	Doherty 71', Clarke 88'	7,449
2	18 August	Dundee United	H	1–0	Street 57'	5,882
3	25 August	Celtic	A	0–5		24,584
4	8 September	Hibernian	H	1–0	Jardine 88'	4,654
5	15 September	Partick Thistle	A	0–0		5,078
6	22 September	Greenock Morton	A	1–3	Gibson 44'	6,618
7	29 September	Rangers	H	2–1	Clark 8', Cairney 79'	15,479
8	6 October	Dundee	H	3–1	Bourke 39', Maxwell 41', 53'	4,674
9	13 October	Aberdeen	A	1–3	Houston 11'	12,791
10	20 October	St Mirren	H	1–1	Houston 16'	6,377
11	27 October	Dundee United	A	0–4		6,403
12	3 November	Celtic	H	2–0	Street 11', Gibson 59'	16,918
13	10 November	Hibernian	A	1–1	Maxwell 78'	5,269
14	17 November	Partick Thistle	H	0–1		4,951
15	1 December	Rangers	A	1–2	Houston 34'	16,557
16	15 December	Dundee	A	1–3	Glennie 27' o.g.	6,016
17	29 December	Dundee United	H	0–0		4,515
18	5 January	Hibernian	H	3–1	Street 20', 25', 57'	6,092
19	12 January	Partick Thistle	A	1–1	Street 72'	4,543
20	19 January	Greenock Morton	A	2–1	Clarke 56', Cramond 84'	5,352
21	9 February	Dundee	H	1–1	Houston 10'	4,432
22	23 February	Aberdeen	A	2–1	Street 4', Garner 42' o.g.	9,567
23	1 March	St Mirren	H	1–1	Mauchlen 76'	6,800
24	8 March	Dundee United	A	0–0		6,497
25	12 March	Greenock Morton	H	1–1	Mauchlen 47'	4,905
26	15 March	Celtic	H	1–1	Street 1'	14,965
27	29 March	Partick Thistle	H	0–1		3,814
28	1 April	Aberdeen	H	0–4		5,020
29	5 April	Greenock Morton	H	0–2		4,309
30	12 April	St Mirren	A	1–3	Clarke 25'	6,740
31	16 April	Celtic	A	0–2		16,695
32	19 April	Aberdeen	H	1–3	Gibson 14' pen.	3,533
33	21 April	Hibernian	A	2–1	Houston 6', 70'	2,659
34	23 April	Rangers	H	1–0	Street 11'	8,504
35	26 April	Dundee	A	2–0	McDicken 51', Cairney 60'	2,665
36	30 April	Rangers	A	0–1		7,655

== Scottish League Cup ==
Round	Date	Opponent	H/A	Score	Kilmarnock scorer(s)	Attendance
R1 L1	15 August	Alloa Athletic	H	2–0	Jardine 32', Doherty 69'	2,491
R1 L2	22 August	Alloa Athletic	A	1–1(aet)	Doherty 106'	1,696
R2 L1	29 August	Forfar Athletic	H	2–0	Clarke 47', Gibson 65'	2,220
R2 L2	1 September	Forfar Athletic	A	1–1	Maxwell 6'	1,565
R3 L1	26 September	Hibernian	A	2–1	Cairney 23', Bourke 60'	2,659
18	10 October	Hibernian	H	2–1	Maxwell 27', Bourke 71'	5,353
QF L1	31 October	Greenock Morton	A	2–3	McLean 28', Street 70'	7,046
QF L2	24 November	Greenock Morton	H	3–2(aet, lost 3–5 on penalties)	Clarke 70', Cairney 92', Gibson 115'	8,407

== Scottish Cup ==
Round	Date	Opponent	H/A	Score	Kilmarnock scorer(s)	Attendance
R3	30 January	Partick Thistle	H	0–1		7,677

== Drybrough Cup ==
Round	Date	Opponent	H/A	Score	Kilmarnock scorer(s)	Attendance
QF	28 July	Aberdeen	H	1–0	Street 66'	4,548
SF	1 August	Rangers	H	0–2		10,035

== Anglo-Scottish Cup ==
Round	Date	Opponent	H/A	Score	Kilmarnock scorer(s)	Attendance
R1 L1	6 August	Dundee	A	1–1	Clarke 41'	3,832
R1 L2	8 August	Dundee	H	3–3(lost on away goals)	Street 36', 67', Gibson 38'	3,719

== See also ==
- List of Kilmarnock F.C. seasons
