= List of Kilmarnock F.C. seasons =

This is a list of seasons played by Kilmarnock Football Club, an association football club based in Kilmarnock in East Ayrshire, Scotland, up to the present day. The list details the club's record in major league and cup competitions. Records of regular minor competitions, such as the Ayrshire Cup which Kilmarnock won 43 times, are not included.

== Summary ==
Kilmarnock's league performance from their first season in 1895 to the 2018–19 season.

Kilmarnock F.C. was founded in 1869 during a general meeting at Robertson's Temperance Hotel on Portland Street. The club first played professional football in 1873 when they participated in the inaugural season of the Scottish Cup, an annual knockout competition. They did not play league fixtures until 1895 when they joined the Scottish Football League, competing in the 1895–96 Scottish Division Two.

Having won the Scottish Cup twice (1920 and 1929) from five appearances in the final before the Second World War, the club's finest achievement was winning the Scottish league title in 1964–65, securing the championship on goal average on the final day by beating direct challengers Hearts 2–0 away from home. It ended a long wait for a trophy – they had been runners-up in four of the past five seasons, and had lost in major domestic cup finals four times in the previous seven years. In the 1966–67 season, Kilmarnock reached the semi-finals of the Inter-Cities Fairs Cup, but this was to mark the end of their spell of high achievement, and by 1972–73 they had been relegated for only the second time in their history.

They spent the next two decades regularly swapping between the first and second levels (and one season in the third) before going up to the top tier in 1992–93; they have remained there since, with only three other clubs having longer current runs at that level. Killie won the Scottish Cup for a third time in 1997, and finally claimed the Scottish League Cup, in their sixth appearance in the final, in 2012. In 2018–19, the club's 150th anniversary season, they finished in 3rd place in the Scottish Premiership, their highest position and points total in the modern era.

On 24 May 2021 Kilmarnock were relegated to the Scottish Championship. This is the first time in 28 years they will have played out of the top flight.

== Seasons ==
=== Pre-1891 ===
Between the club's formation in 1869 and 1891 – when they joined the Scottish Football Alliance – Kilmarnock only competed in cup competitions including the Scottish Cup and the Ayrshire Cup.

Season	Scottish Cup	Ayrshire Cup	Kilmarnock Merchants' Charity Cup	Ayr Charity Cup	Glasgow Exhibition Cup
1873–74	First round				
1874–75	Second round				
1875–76	Second round				
1876–77	Second round				
1877–78	Second round	Second round			
1878–79	First round	First round			
1879–80	Second round	Third round			
1880–81	Third round	Third round			
1881–82	Fifth round	Runner-up	First round		
1882–83	Second round	First round	First round		
1883–84	Third round	Winners	Winners		
1884–85	Second round	Winners	Runner-up	Runner-up	
1885–86	Second round	Winners	Winners		
1886–87	Quarter-final	Second round	Runner-up		
1887–88	Fourth round	Third round	Runner-up	Winners	
1888–89	Second round	Semi-final	Runner-up	Semi-final	First round
1889–90	First round	First round	Semi-final		
1890–91	First round	Winners			

Notes

1. a- The Ayrshire Cup wasn't played until season 1877–78.
2. b- The Kilmarnock Merchants' Charity Cup wasn't played until season 1880–81. Kilmarnock did not enter the competition in 1880–81 or 1890–91.
3. c- The Ayr Charity Cup wasn't played until season 1884–85. Kilmarnock did not enter the competition in 1885–86, 1886–87, 1889–90 or 1890–91.
4. d- The Glasgow Exhibition Cup was a one-off tournament played in 1888.

=== 1891–1914 ===
Season	League record									Scottish Cup	Other competitions	
Season	Division	Pos	P	W	D	L	F	A	Pts	Scottish Cup	Competition	Result
1891–92	Scottish Football Alliance	2nd	22	13	3	6	73	38	29	Second round	Ayrshire Cup	Third round
1891–92	Scottish Football Alliance	2nd	22	13	3	6	73	38	29	Second round	Kilmarnock Merchants' Charity Cup	Winners
1892–93	Scottish Football Alliance	7th	18	4	5	9	42	50	13	Second round		
1893–94	Ayrshire Football Combination	5th	12	5	1	6	34	24	11	First round		
1894–95	Ayrshire Football Combination	3rd	16	11	2	3	56	29	16	Second round		
1895–96	SFL Division Two	4th	18	10	1	7	45	45	21	First round		
1896–97	SFL Division Two	3rd	18	10	1	7	44	33	21	Semi-final	Scottish Qualifying Cup	Winners
1897–98	SFL Division Two	1st	18	14	1	3	64	29	29	Runner-up		
1898–99	SFL Division Two ↑	1st	18	14	4	0	73	24	32	Quarter-final		
1899–1900	SFL Division One	5th	18	6	6	6	30	37	18	Quarter-final	Glasgow & West of Scotland League	Joint winners
1900–01	SFL Division One	5th	20	7	4	9	35	47	18	Second round		
1901–02	SFL Division One	7th	18	5	6	7	21	25	16	Quarter-final		
1902–03	SFL Division One	9th	22	6	4	12	24	43	16	Second round		
1903–04	SFL Division One	14th	26	4	5	17	24	63	13	Quarter-final		
1904–05	SFL Division One	9th	26	9	5	12	29	45	23	First round		
1905–06	SFL Division One	15th	30	8	4	18	46	68	20	Second round	Glasgow & West of Scotland League	Winners
1906–07	SFL Division One	16th	34	8	5	21	40	72	21	Second round		
1907–08	SFL Division One	14th	34	6	13	15	38	61	25	Semi-final		
1908–09	SFL Division One	10th	34	13	7	14	47	61	33	First round		
1909–10	SFL Division One	11th	34	12	8	14	53	60	32	First round		
1910–11	SFL Division One	10th	34	12	10	12	43	45	34	First round		
1911–12	SFL Division One	16th	34	11	4	19	38	60	26	Third round		
1912–13	SFL Division One	11th	34	10	11	13	37	54	31	Third round		
1913–14	SFL Division One	12th	38	11	9	18	48	68	31	Third round		

Notes

1. e- Kilmarnock were deducted 3 points in 1894–95.
2. f- Kilmarnock tied with Renton for third place in 1895–96 so a play-off was arranged to decide who would be the third team to go forward for election to Division One. Renton won the match 2–1 but amassed just one vote at the election and were not elected to Division One.
3. g- As one of the top three teams in Division Two, Kilmarnock were put forward for election to Division One. However, they did not receive a single vote at the election and remained in Division Two.
4. h- Despite winning Division Two, Kilmarnock were not elected to Division One for the 1898–99 season. Clyde defeated Kilmarnock on a second ballot as all three member clubs seeking re-election were re-elected.
5. i- Kilmarnock were elected to Division One for the first time after receiving 15 votes at the election.
6. j- As one of the bottom two teams, Kilmarnock faced re-election for the first time. At the election, they received eight votes and were re-elected along with Motherwell.
7. k- Kilmarnock tied with Port Glasgow Athletic for 14th place in 1905–06 so a play-off was arranged to decide who would be the second team to face re-election to Division One. Port Glasgow Athletic won the match 6–0 but, after it was decided to increase the number of teams in Division One, Kilmarnock and Queen's Park were unanimously re-elected.
8. l- Kilmarnock tied with Port Glasgow Athletic and Hamilton Academical for 14th place in 1906–07 but it was decided not to arrange a three-way play-off and all three clubs were put up for re-election to Division One. The trio were subsequently re-elected.

=== 1914–1919 ===
During World War I a number of changes were introduced, the Scottish Cup was suspended for the duration of the conflict and a number of teams were weakened as players went off to fight in the war. Kilmarnock continued to compete in the Scottish Football League.

Season	League record									Other competitions	
Season	Division	Pos	P	W	D	L	F	A	Pts	Competition	Result
1914–15	SFL Division One	12th	38	15	4	19	55	59	34		
1915–16	SFL Division One	10th	38	12	11	15	46	49	35		
1916–17	SFL Division One	6th	38	18	7	13	69	45	43		
1917–18	SFL Division One	3rd	34	19	5	10	69	41	43	War Fund Shield	Quarter-final
1918–19	SFL Division One	9th	34	14	7	13	61	59	35	Victory Cup	First round

=== 1919–1939 ===
Season	League record									Scottish Cup	Other competitions	
Season	Division	Pos	P	W	D	L	F	A	Pts	Scottish Cup	Competition	Result
1919–20	SFL Division One	9th	42	20	3	19	59	74	43	Winners		
1920–21	SFL Division One	12th	42	17	8	17	62	68	42	Second round		
1921–22	SFL Division One	17th	42	13	9	20	56	83	35	Second round		
1922–23	SFL Division One	15th	38	14	7	17	57	66	35	Second round		
1923–24	SFL Division One	16th	38	12	8	18	48	65	32	Fourth round		
1924–25	SFL Division One	12th	38	12	9	17	53	64	33	Quarter-final		
1925–26	SFL Division One	9th	38	17	7	14	79	77	41	First round		
1926–27	SFL Division One	16th	38	12	8	18	54	71	32	Second round		
1927–28	SFL Division One	8th	38	15	10	13	68	78	40	Third round		
1928–29	SFL Division One	10th	38	14	8	16	79	74	36	Winners		
1929–30	SFL Division One	8th	38	15	9	14	77	73	39	Second round		
1930–31	SFL Division One	11th	38	15	5	18	59	60	35	Semi-final		
1931–32	SFL Division One	9th	38	16	7	15	68	70	39	Runner-up		
1932–33	SFL Division One	14th	38	13	9	16	72	86	35	Fourth round		
1933–34	SFL Division One	7th	38	17	9	12	73	64	43	Second round		
1934–35	SFL Division One	9th	38	16	6	16	76	68	38	Second round		
1935–36	SFL Division One	8th	38	14	7	17	69	64	35	Second round		
1936–37	SFL Division One	11th	38	14	9	15	60	70	37	First round		
1937–38	SFL Division One	18th	38	12	9	17	65	91	33	Runner-up		
1938–39	SFL Division One	10th	38	15	9	14	73	86	39	Second round		

=== 1939–1946 ===
Kilmarnock were inactive during World War II as their Rugby Park ground was used as a munitions store by the British Army during the conflict. They began the 1939–40 season in the subsequently abandoned SFL Division One before competing in the unofficial Emergency League West, finishing eighth, and the Scottish War Emergency Cup where they reached the quarter-finals. The club began competing after the conflict had ended in 1945–46, again in unofficial competitions. They finished 15th in the Southern League, were eliminated in the group stages of the Southern League Cup and lost in the second round of the Victory Cup.

=== 1946–present ===
Season	League record									Scottish Cup	League Cup	Other competitions	
Season	Division	Pos	P	W	D	L	F	A	Pts	Scottish Cup	League Cup	Competition	Result
1946–47	SFL Division A ↓	15th	30	6	9	15	44	66	21	First round	First round		
1947–48	SFL Division B	6th	30	13	4	13	72	62	30	First round	First round		
1948–49	SFL Division B	6th	30	9	7	14	58	61	25	First round	First round		
1949–50	SFL Division B	7th	30	14	5	11	50	43	33	First round	First round		
1950–51	SFL Division B	12th	30	8	8	14	44	49	24	First round	First round		
1951–52	SFL Division B	5th	30	16	2	12	62	48	34	Second round	First round		
1952–53	SFL Division B	4th	30	17	2	11	74	48	36	Second round	Runner-up		
1953–54	SFL Division B ↑	2nd	30	19	4	7	71	39	42	Second round	Quarter-final		
1954–55	SFL Division A	10th	30	10	6	14	46	58	26	Sixth round	First round		
1955–56	SFL Division One	8th	34	12	10	12	52	45	34	Sixth round	First round		
1956–57	SFL Division One	3rd	34	16	10	8	57	39	42	Runner-up	First round		
1957–58	SFL Division One	5th	34	14	9	11	60	55	37	Third round	Quarter-final		
1958–59	SFL Division One	8th	34	13	8	13	58	51	34	Quarter-final	Semi-final		
1959–60	SFL Division One	2nd	34	24	2	8	67	45	50	Runner-up	First round		
1960–61	SFL Division One	2nd	34	21	8	5	77	45	50	Second round	Runner-up		
1961–62	SFL Division One	5th	34	16	10	8	74	58	42	Quarter-final	First round		
1962–63	SFL Division One	2nd	34	20	8	6	92	40	48	Second round	Runner-up		
1963–64	SFL Division One	2nd	34	22	5	7	77	40	49	Semi-final	First round	Summer Cup	Semi-final
1964–65	SFL Division One	1st	34	22	6	6	62	33	50	Quarter-final	First round	Inter-Cities Fairs Cup	Second round
1964–65	SFL Division One	1st	34	22	6	6	62	33	50	Quarter-final	First round	Summer Cup	Group stage
1965–66	SFL Division One	3rd	34	20	5	9	73	46	45	Quarter-final	Semi-final	European Cup	First round
1966–67	SFL Division One	7th	34	16	8	10	59	46	40	First round	First round	Inter-Cities Fairs Cup	Semi-final
1967–68	SFL Division One	7th	34	13	8	13	59	57	34	First round	Quarter-final		
1968–69	SFL Division One	4th	34	15	14	5	50	32	44	Quarter-final	First round		
1969–70	SFL Division One	7th	34	13	10	11	62	57	36	Semi-final	First round	Inter-Cities Fairs Cup	Third round
1970–71	SFL Division One	13th	34	10	8	16	43	67	28	Quarter-final	First round	Inter-Cities Fairs Cup	First round
1971–72	SFL Division One	11th	34	11	6	17	49	64	28	Semi-final	First round		
1972–73	SFL Division One ↓	17th	34	7	8	19	40	71	22	Fourth round	First round	Texaco Cup	First round
1973–74	SFL Division Two ↑	2nd	36	26	6	4	96	44	58	Third round	Semi-final		
1974–75	SFL Division One ↓	12th	34	8	15	11	52	68	31	Third round	Quarter-final	Drybrough Cup	First round
1975–76	SFL First Division ↑	2nd	26	16	3	7	44	29	40	Quarter-final	First round	Spring Cup	Group stage
1976–77	SFL Premier Division ↓	10th	36	4	9	23	32	71	17	Third round	First round		
1977–78	SFL First Division	6th	39	14	12	13	52	46	40	Quarter-final	Second round		
1978–79	SFL First Division ↑	2nd	39	22	10	7	72	35	54	Fourth round	Third round		
1979–80	SFL Premier Division	8th	36	11	11	14	36	52	33	Third round	Quarter-final	Drybrough Cup	Semi-final
1980–81	SFL Premier Division ↓	9th	36	5	9	22	23	65	19	Fourth round	Third round		
1981–82	SFL First Division ↑	2nd	39	17	17	5	60	29	51	Quarter-final	First round		
1982–83	SFL Premier Division ↓	10th	36	3	11	22	28	91	17	Third round	Quarter-final		
1983–84	SFL First Division	6th	39	16	6	17	57	53	38	Third round	Third round		
1984–85	SFL First Division	12th	39	12	10	17	42	61	34	Third round	Third round		
1985–86	SFL First Division	3rd	39	18	8	13	62	49	44	Fourth round	Second round		
1986–87	SFL First Division	6th	44	17	11	16	62	53	45	Third round	Second round		
1987–88	SFL First Division	10th	44	13	11	20	55	61	37	Third round	Second round		
1988–89	SFL First Division ↓	13th	39	10	14	15	47	60	34	Third round	Third round		
1989–90	SFL Second Division ↑	2nd	39	21	5	13	67	41	47	Second round	Second round		
1990–91	SFL First Division	5th	39	15	13	11	58	48	43	Fourth round	Third round	Challenge Cup	Semi-final
1991–92	SFL First Division	4th	44	21	12	11	59	37	54	Third round	Third round	Challenge Cup	Second round
1992–93	SFL First Division ↑	2nd	44	21	12	11	67	40	54	Fourth round	Quarter-final	Challenge Cup	Quarter-final
1993–94	SFL Premier Division	8th	44	12	16	16	36	45	40	Semi-final	Second round		
1994–95	SFL Premier Division	7th	36	11	10	15	40	48	43	Quarter-final	Third round		
1995–96	SFL Premier Division	7th	36	11	8	17	39	54	41	Fourth round	Third round		
1996–97	SFL Premier Division	7th	36	11	6	19	41	61	39	Winners	Second round		
1997–98	SFL Premier Division	4th	36	13	11	12	40	52	50	Fourth round	Third round	UEFA Cup Winners' Cup	First round
1998–99	Scottish Premier League	4th	36	14	14	8	47	29	56	Third round	Quarter-final	UEFA Cup	Second qualifying round
1999–2000	Scottish Premier League	9th	36	8	13	15	38	52	37	Third round	Semi-final	UEFA Cup	First round
2000–01	Scottish Premier League	4th	38	15	9	14	44	53	54	Quarter-final	Runner-up		
2001–02	Scottish Premier League	5th	38	13	10	15	44	54	49	Fourth round	Third round	UEFA Cup	First round
2002–03	Scottish Premier League	4th	38	16	9	13	47	56	57	Third round	Second round		
2003–04	Scottish Premier League	10th	38	12	6	20	51	74	42	Fourth round	Second round		
2004–05	Scottish Premier League	7th	38	15	4	19	49	55	49	Fourth round	Third round		
2005–06	Scottish Premier League	5th	38	15	10	13	63	64	55	Third round	Third round		
2006–07	Scottish Premier League	5th	38	16	7	15	47	54	55	Third round	Runner-up		
2007–08	Scottish Premier League	11th	38	10	10	18	39	52	40	Fifth round	Third round		
2008–09	Scottish Premier League	8th	38	12	8	18	38	48	44	Fifth round	Quarter-final		
2009–10	Scottish Premier League	11th	38	8	9	21	29	51	33	Quarter-final	Third round		
2010–11	Scottish Premier League	5th	38	13	10	15	53	55	49	Fourth round	Quarter-final		
2011–12	Scottish Premier League	7th	38	11	14	13	44	61	47	Fifth round	Winners		
2012–13	Scottish Premier League	9th	38	11	12	15	52	53	45	Quarter-final	Second round		
2013–14	SPFL Premiership	9th	38	11	6	21	45	66	39	Fourth round	Second round		
2014–15	SPFL Premiership	10th	38	11	8	19	44	59	41	Fourth round	Third round		
2015–16	SPFL Premiership	11th	38	9	9	20	41	64	36	Fifth round	Third round		
2016–17	SPFL Premiership	8th	38	9	14	15	36	56	41	Fourth round	First round		
2017–18	SPFL Premiership	5th	38	16	11	11	49	47	59	Quarter-final	Second round		
2018–19	SPFL Premiership	3rd	38	19	10	9	50	31	67	Fifth round	Second round		
2019–20	SPFL Premiership	8th	30	9	6	15	31	41	33	Fifth round	Quarter-final	UEFA Europa League	First qualifying round
2020–21	SPFL Premiership ↓	11th	38	10	6	22	43	54	36	Quarter-final	Group stage		
2021–22	SPFL Championship ↑	1st	36	20	7	9	50	27	67	Fourth round	Second round	Scottish Challenge Cup	Semi-final
2022–23	SPFL Premiership	10th	38	11	7	20	37	62	40	Quarter-final	Semi-final		
2023–24	SPFL Premiership	4th	38	14	14	10	46	44	56	Quarter-final	Quarter-final		
2024–25	SPFL Premiership	9th	38	12	8	18	45	64	44	Fourth round	Second round	UEFA Europa League	Second qualifying round
2024–25	SPFL Premiership	9th	38	12	8	18	45	64	44	Fourth round	Second round	UEFA Conference League	Play-off round

Notes

1. m- 3 points for a win came into effect.
2. n- Remained in the Premiership via the play-offs, beating Championship runners-up Falkirk 4–1 on aggregate in the final.
3. o- The 2019–20 Scottish Premiership was suspended in March 2020 due to the COVID-19 pandemic in Scotland. The season was subsequently curtailed on 18 May 2020 and a points-per-game average was used to calculate a final table.
4. p- Relegated via the play-offs after losing to Championship runners-up Dundee 4–2 on aggregate in the final.

== League performance summary ==
The Scottish Football League was founded in 1890 and, other than during seven years of hiatus during World War II, (Note: The incomplete 1939–40 edition has not been counted in the totals.) the national top division has been played every season since. (Note: The top tier became the Scottish Premier League in 1998, and all four divisions became the Scottish Professional Football League in 2013.) The following is a summary of Kilmarnock's divisional status:

- 125 total eligible seasons (including 2019–20)
- 93 seasons in top level (Note: Has existed between 1890–1939, and since 1946.)
- 26 seasons in second level (Note: Has existed between 1893–1915, 1921–1939 and since 1946.)
- 1 season in third level (Note: Has existed between 1923–1926, 1946–1949, and since 1976.)
- 0 seasons in fourth level (Note: Has existed since 1994.)
- 5 seasons not involved – before club was league member
