= 1978–79 Kilmarnock F.C. season =

Kilmarnock
1978–79 season
- Chairman: Tom Lauchlan
- Manager: Davie Sneddon
- Scottish First Division: 2nd
- Scottish Cup: R4
- Scottish League Cup: R3
- Top goalscorer: League: John Bourke 21; All: John Bourke 23
- Highest home attendance: 5,946 (v Ayr United, 4 November)
- Lowest home attendance: 1,906 (v Montrose, 20 January)
- Average home league attendance: 3,033 (up 171)

The 1978–79 season was Kilmarnock's 77th in Scottish League Competitions. They finished in 2nd place and were promoted at the end of the season to the Premier Division.

== Squad ==
Note: Flags indicate national team as defined under FIFA eligibility rules; some limited exceptions apply. Players may hold more than one non-FIFA nationality.

| No. | Pos. | Nation | Player |
|---|---|---|---|
| — | GK | SCO | Alan McCulloch |
| — | DF | SCO | Alan Robertson |
| — | DF | SCO | Derrick McDicken |
| — | DF | SCO | Stuart McLean |
| — | DF | SCO | Paul Clarke |
| — | DF | SCO | Frank Welsh |
| — | DF | SCO | Ian Baird |
| — | DF | SCO | David Hynds |
| — | DF | ENG | Ken Armstrong |
| — | DF | SCO | Tony Taylor |
| — | MF | SCO | David Provan |
| — | MF | SCO | George Maxwell |

| No. | Pos. | Nation | Player |
|---|---|---|---|
| — | MF | SCO | Billy Murdoch |
| — | MF | SCO | Jim Doherty |
| — | MF | SCO | Iain Jardine |
| — | MF | SCO | Jim Clark |
| — | MF | SCO | Ally Mauchlen |
| — | FW | SCO | Donny MacDowell |
| — | FW | SCO | John Bourke |
| — | FW | SCO | Joe Cairney |
| — | FW | SCO | Ian Gibson |
| — | FW | SCO | Jim Hughes |
| — | FW | SCO | Bobby Street |

== Scottish First Division ==
=== League table ===
| Pos | Team | Pld | W | D | L | GF | GA | GD | Pts | Promotion or relegation |
|---|---|---|---|---|---|---|---|---|---|---|
| 1 | Dundee (C, P) | 39 | 24 | 7 | 8 | 69 | 36 | +33 | 55 | Promotion to the Premier Division |
| 2 | Kilmarnock (P) | 39 | 22 | 10 | 7 | 72 | 36 | +36 | 54 | Promotion to the Premier Division |
| 3 | Clydebank | 39 | 24 | 6 | 9 | 78 | 50 | +28 | 54 | |
| 4 | Ayr United | 39 | 21 | 5 | 13 | 73 | 54 | +19 | 47 | |
| 5 | Hamilton Academical | 39 | 17 | 9 | 13 | 63 | 61 | +2 | 43 | |

Source: RSSSF and statto
Rules for classification: 1) points; 2) goal difference; 3) number of goals scored.
(C) Champions; (P) Promoted

=== Match results ===
| Match Day | Date | Opponent | H/A | Score | Kilmarnock scorer(s) | Attendance |
|---|---|---|---|---|---|---|
| 1 | 12 August | Clydebank | A | 1–2 | Cairney 60' | 1,854 |
| 2 | 19 August | Airdrieonians | H | 2–0 | Maxwell 53', Cairney 63' | 2,707 |
| 3 | 26 August | Ayr United | A | 0–0 | | 4,974 |
| 4 | 6 September | Dumbarton | H | 0–0 | | 2,420 |
| 5 | 9 September | Dundee | H | 1–1 | Cairney 23' | 3,113 |
| 6 | 13 September | St Johnstone | A | 0–0 | | 1,292 |
| 7 | 16 September | Stirling Albion | A | 4–1 | McDicken 32', Provan 33', Doherty 49', Maxwell 65' | 1,434 |
| 8 | 23 September | Montrose | H | 2–2 | Maxwell 37', Street 60' | 2,447 |
| 9 | 27 September | Clyde | A | 1–1 | McDowell 86' | 1,301 |
| 10 | 30 September | Queen of the South | A | 1–2 | Street 54' | 1,423 |
| 11 | 7 October | Arbroath | H | 3–1 | McDowell 8', Maxwell 28' pen., Jardine 64' | 2,556 |
| 12 | 14 October | Raith Rovers | H | 3–0 | Cairney 28', Hughes 29', Bourke 71' | 2,621 |
| 13 | 21 October | Hamilton Academical | A | 3–2 | Cairney 55', Maxwell 80' pen., Bourke 86' | 2,601 |
| 14 | 28 October | Airdrieonians | A | 1–4 | Bourke 84' | 2,505 |
| 15 | 4 November | Ayr United | H | 1–2 | Hughes 70' | 5,946 |
| 16 | 11 November | Dundee | A | 0–0 | | 5,620 |
| 17 | 19 November | Stirling Albion | H | 5–0 | Bourke 35', 89', Gibson 52', Doherty 76', Maxwell 80' | 2,780 |
| 18 | 25 November | Montrose | A | 4–0 | Maxwell 8', 39', Hughes 40', Jardine 86' | 874 |
| 19 | 2 December | Queen of the South | H | 0–0 | | 2,791 |
| 20 | 9 December | Arbroath | A | 2–3 | Street 81', Clark 85' | 880 |
| 21 | 16 December | Raith Rovers | A | 3–1 | Bourke 6', 87', Maxwell 65' | 1,843 |
| 22 | 23 December | Hamilton Academical | H | 4–0 | Bourke 19', 66', 76', Gibson 59' | 2,850 |
| 23 | 20 January | Montrose | H | 4–1 | Clarke 30', Gibson 35', 84', Bourke 39' | 1,906 |
| 24 | 3 February | St Johnstone | H | 3–2 | Bourke 14', Hamilton 19' o.g., Clark 42' | 3,200 |
| 25 | 10 February | Arbroath | A | 1–0 | Gibson 74' | 1,284 |
| 26 | 24 February | Raith Rovers | H | 2–1 | Maxwell 64', Street 65' | 3,267 |
| 27 | 3 March | Clydebank | H | 0–0 | | 3,518 |
| 28 | 7 March | Ayr United | A | 1–2 | Clark 52' | 5,693 |
| 29 | 13 March | Dumbarton | A | 3–0 | Cairney 23', Bourke 29', Maxwell 49' pen. | 1,345 |
| 30 | 17 March | St Johnstone | H | 3–1 | Cairney 21', Gibson 70', 77' | 2,315 |
| 31 | 24 March | Clyde | H | 2–1 | Bourke 19', 24' | 2,417 |
| 32 | 31 March | Clydebank | A | 2–1 | Gibson 12', Bourke 16' | 2,519 |
| 33 | 4 April | Stirling Albion | A | 0–0 | | 1,352 |
| 34 | 7 April | Clyde | A | 1–0 | Bourke 2' | 2,509 |
| 35 | 11 April | Airdrieonians | H | 1–0 | Bourke 54' | 2,665 |
| 36 | 14 April | Queen of the South | H | 3–1 | Street 28', Bourke 38', Cairney 87' | 2,978 |
| 37 | 21 April | Hamilton Academical | A | 0–1 | | 2,897 |
| 38 | 25 April | Dundee | H | 2–1 | McDicken 59', Bourke 61' | 5,072 |
| 39 | 28 April | Dumbarton | A | 3–1 | Cairney 14', Gibson 51', Bourke 78' | 2,278 |

== Scottish League Cup ==
| Round | Date | Opponent | H/A | Score | Kilmarnock scorer(s) | Attendance |
|---|---|---|---|---|---|---|
| R2 L1 | 30 August | Alloa Athletic | H | 2–0 | McDowell 5', Street 32' | 2,080 |
| R2 L2 | 2 September | Alloa Athletic | A | 1–1 | Cairney 41' | 1,301 |
| R3 L1 | 4 October | Greenock Morton | H | 2–0 | Cairney 1', Maxwell 35' | 3,967 |
| R3 L2 | 11 October | Greenock Morton | A | 2–5 | McDicken 8', Welsh 70' | 5,623 |

== Scottish Cup ==
| Round | Date | Opponent | H/A | Score | Kilmarnock scorer(s) | Attendance |
|---|---|---|---|---|---|---|
| R3 | 31 January | Clyde | A | 5–1 | Gibson 1', Bourke 47', 82', Street 61', 76' | 2,509 |
| R4 | 21 February | Rangers | A | 1–1 | McDicken 72' | 17,500 |
| R4R | 26 February | Rangers | H | 0–1 | | 19,493 |

== See also ==
- List of Kilmarnock F.C. seasons
