= 1987–88 Kilmarnock F.C. season =

Kilmarnock
1987–88 season
- Chairman: Bob Lauchlan
- Manager: Eddie Morrison
- Scottish First Division: 10th
- Scottish Cup: 3R
- Scottish League Cup: 2R
- Top goalscorer: League: Colin Harkness 15; All: Colin Harkness 16
- Highest home attendance: 3,230 (v Queen of the South, 2 January)
- Lowest home attendance: 1,235 (v Forfar Athletic, 22 August)
- Average home league attendance: 1,846 (down 1,000)

The 1987–88 season was Kilmarnock's 86th in Scottish League Competitions. After a troublesome season exacerbated by their lack of scoring, the club staved off relegation, finishing in 10th place, one point ahead East Fife and Dumbarton who were relegated.

By early March 1988, the team had only ten wins and 41 goals in 34 games and were rated as being in "dire straits" in terms of potential relegation to the Second Division. The team's poor performance was blamed on a "lack of punch up front."

With one game remaining in the season, the club faced relegation if they did not win the final game. Kilmarnock keeper Alan McCulloch returned from a suspected broken hand for the final game. Kilmarnock defeated Partick Thistle 1–0 in the final game to avoid relegation.

Manager Eddie Morrison, interviewed by The Kilmarnock Standard, described the season as "probably one of the most disappointing the club has ever experienced" and added, "The team's performances were, to say the least, erratic, frustrating and at times very disappointing."

== Players ==
The 1987–88 squad for Kilmarnock was as follows:

- Archie Bell
- Ian Bryson
- Robert Clark
- Jim Cockburn
- Derek Cook
- Scott Cuthbertson
- Frazer Davidson
- Colin Harkness
- Barry Holland
- Hugh Houston
- Lex Lindsay
- Lenny Lowe
- Stephen Marshall
- Paul Martin
- Graham Millar
- Bobby McConville
- Alan McCulloch
- Jim McGuire
- Ian McInnes
- Stuart McLean
- John McVeigh
- Joe Reid
- Alan Robertson

== Competitions ==
=== Scottish First Division ===
==== Tables ====
Pos	Team	Pld	W	D	L	GF	GA	GD	Pts	Promotion or relegation
8	Partick Thistle	44	16	9	19	60	64	−4	41	
9	Clyde	44	16	6	22	73	75	−2	38	
10	Kilmarnock	44	13	11	20	55	60	−5	37	
11	East Fife (R)	44	13	10	21	61	76	−15	36	Relegation to the Second Division
12	Dumbarton (R)	44	12	12	20	51	70	−19	36	Relegation to the Second Division

Source: RSSSF and statto
Rules for classification: 1) points; 2) goal difference; 3) number of goals scored.
(R) Relegated

==== Results ====
Match Day	Date	Opponent	H/A	Score	Kilmarnock scorer(s)	Attendance
1	8 August	Hamilton Academical	H	0–2		2,178
2	12 August	East Fife	A	1–2	Reid 24'	657
3	15 August	Dumbarton	A	3–1	Harkness 46', McInnes 63', Cuthbertson 81'	824
4	22 August	Forfar Athletic	H	2–2	Harkness 6', Reid 87'	1,235
5	29 August	Queen of the South	H	0–2		1,836
6	5 September	Meadowbank Thistle	A	1–2	Cook 45'	698
7	12 September	Raith Rovers	H	3–4	Cuthbertson 7', Harkness 12', McInnes 52'	1,436
8	15 September	Clydebank	A	0–2		857
9	19 September	Airdrieonians	A	2–3	Bryson 9', Lawrie 70' o.g.	1,513
10	26 September	Clyde	H	2–0	Harkness 16', Bryson 43'	1,732
11	29 September	Partick Thistle	H	1–1	Harkness 39'	2,030
12	3 October	Hamilton Academical	A	1–1	Harkness 35'	1,218
13	6 October	East Fife	H	2–0	Harkness 37', 89'	1,441
14	10 October	Forfar Athletic	A	0–2		896
15	17 October	Raith Rovers	A	2–0	Gilmour 31' pen., Harkness 47'	2,187
16	20 October	Clydebank	H	1–3	McGuire 79'	1,733
17	24 October	Dumbarton	H	1–0	Gilmour 89'	1,571
18	31 October	Meadowbank Thistle	H	2–4	Harkness 22', 88'	1,442
19	3 November	Partick Thistle	A	0–1		1,407
20	7 November	Queen of the South	A	4–1	Bryson 71', McInnes 74', Reid 89', 90'	1,479
21	14 November	Airdrieonians	H	1–0	Reid 14'	1,978
22	21 November	Clyde	A	0–2		1,145
23	28 November	Hamilton Academical	H	1–0	Harkness 55'	1,922
24	5 December	East Fife	A	1–2	Bryson 38'	571
25	12 December	Raith Rovers	H	1–1	Reid 73'	1,654
26	19 December	Clydebank	A	0–1		1,015
27	26 December	Meadowbank Thistle	A	3–1	McFarlane 44', Harkness 78', 87'	751
28	2 January	Queen of the South	H	0–0		3,230
29	9 January	Airdrieonians	A	3–3	Gilmour 29' pen., McFarlane 67', 70'	1,588
30	16 January	Clyde	H	3–1	Harkness 21', Bryson 44', Cuthbertson 64'	1,752
31	23 January	Dumbarton	A	0–1		1,048
32	6 February	Forfar Athletic	H	0–2		1,281
33	13 February	Partick Thistle	H	0–1		2,432
34	27 February	Hamilton Academical	A	0–1		2,048
35	5 March	Raith Rovers	A	2–2	Davidson 80', Cuthbertson 87'	1,462
36	12 March	Clydebank	H	2–2	Martin 23', Bourke 46'	1,549
37	19 March	Meadowbank Thistle	H	0–0		1,662
38	26 March	Queen of the South	A	0–1		1,650
39	2 April	Forfar Athletic	A	1–1	Gilmour 85' pen.	713
40	9 April	Dumbarton	H	3–1	Gilmour 49', McGuire 55', Bryson 63'	2,205
41	16 April	Clyde	A	0–0		1,120
42	23 April	Airdrieonians	H	4–1	Bourke 10', McGuire 51', 80', Gilmour 56' pen.	1,953
43	30 April	East Fife	H	1–3	Gilmoue	2,488
44	7 May	Partick Thistle	A	1–0	Gilmour 66'	3,103

== Scottish League Cup ==
Round	Date	Opponent	H/A	Score	Kilmarnock scorer(s)	Attendance
R2	19 August	Heart of Midlothian	A	1–6	Bryson 62' pen.	9,500

== Scottish Cup ==
Round	Date	Opponent	H/A	Score	Kilmarnock scorer(s)	Attendance
R3	30 January	Motherwell	A	0–0		6,488
R3R	3 February	Motherwell	H	1–3	Harkness 49'	7,591

== See also ==
- List of Kilmarnock F.C. seasons

== Offline sources ==
Rollin, Jack (1988). Rothmans Football Yearbook 1988–89. Queen Anne Press. ISBN 0-356-15880-2.

Ross, David (2001). Everygame-The New Official History of Kilmarnock Football Club. Kilmarnock Football Club. ISBN 0-9541653-0-6.
