= 1988–89 Kilmarnock F.C. season =

Kilmarnock
1988–89 season
- Chairman: Bob Lauchlan
- Manager: Eddie Morrison until November 1988 Jim Fleeting from November 1988
- Scottish First Division: 13th
- Scottish Cup: 3R
- Scottish League Cup: 3R
- Top goalscorer: League: Willie Watters 12; All: Willie Watters 13
- Highest home attendance: 5,387 (v Ayr United, 27 August)
- Lowest home attendance: 1,584 (v Forfar Athletic, 18 March)
- Average home league attendance: 2,488 (up 642)

The 1988–89 season was Kilmarnock's 87th in Scottish League Competitions. After a poor run of results, manager Eddie Morrison was sacked in November 1988. Jim Clark initially took over as caretaker before the club hired Jim Fleeting for the rest of the season. Less than two months into the job, he sensationally sacked centre half Kenny Brannigan who was sent off for head butting former teammate Derek Cook three minutes into the league game with Queen of The South. Despite a 6–0 victory in their last game, the club was relegated to the third tier at the end of the season for the first time on a goal difference by just one goal.

Off the field, the club were subject to two takeover bids during the season. In September, Largs businessman Hugh Scott offered £500,000 for a controlling interest in the club. A second bid was launched in January by a consortium led by the manager's brother Bobby Fleeting.

== Scottish First Division ==
=== League table ===
Pos	Team	Pld	W	D	L	GF	GA	GD	Pts	Promotion or relegation
10	Meadowbank Thistle	39	13	10	16	45	50	−5	36	
11	Ayr United	39	13	9	17	56	72	−16	35	
12	Clyde	39	9	16	14	40	52	−12	34	
13	Kilmarnock (R)	39	10	14	15	47	60	−13	34	Relegation to the Second Division
14	Queen of the South (R)	39	2	8	29	38	99	−61	12	Relegation to the Second Division

Source: RSSSF and statto
Rules for classification: 1) points; 2) goal difference; 3) number of goals scored.
(R) Relegated

=== Match results ===
Match Day	Date	Opponent	H/A	Score	Kilmarnock scorer(s)	Attendance
1	13 August	Queen of the South	A	2–2	Gilmour 51', McGuire 70'	1,587
2	20 August	Partick Thistle	H	0–1		2,442
3	27 August	Ayr United	H	2–0	McGuire 39', Marshall 60'	5,387
4	3 September	Clydebank	A	2–2	McGuire 5', Cuthbertson 73'	1,418
5	10 September	Airdrieonians	A	1–5	Cook 70'	2,016
6	17 September	Clyde	H	1–2	McDonald 12'	1,745
7	24 September	Dunfermline Athletic	A	0–3		5,379
8	1 October	Greenock Morton	H	3–4	Cook 4', Martin 60', McInnes ?'	1,865
9	8 October	Forfar Athletic	A	2–2	McGuire 22', Gilmour 50'	685
10	15 October	Meadowbank Thistle	A	2–0	Montgomerie 81', Cook 89'	1,185
11	22 October	Raith Rovers	H	1–1	Wylde 9'	1,965
12	29 October	St Johnstone	A	0–2		2,329
13	5 November	Falkirk	H	0–2		2,561
14	12 November	Airdrieonians	H	0–3		1,958
15	19 November	Clyde	A	2–0	McFarlane 31', 45'	1,028
16	26 November	Dunfermline Athletic	H	2–2	Gilmour 57' pen., Brannigan 65'	2,761
17	3 December	Partick Thistle	A	1–0	McFarlane 37'	2,624
18	10 December	St Johnstone	H	0–3		2,501
19	17 December	Raith Rovers	A	0–0		1,514
20	24 December	Meadowbank Thistle	H	1–0	Watters 28'	2,391
21	31 December	Clydebank	H	1–0	McLaughlin 5'	2,760
22	3 January	Ayr United	A	1–4	Faulds 46'	8,585
23	7 January	Falkirk	A	0–2		3,972
24	14 January	Queen of the South	H	2–1	Walker 38', Watters 87'	2,264
25	21 January	Forfar Athletic	H	2–1	Watters 37', 74'	1,813
26	18 February	Clyde	H	0–0		1,953
27	25 February	St Johnstone	A	2–2	Watters 49', Reilly 83'	2,393
28	1 March	Greenock Morton	A	2–2	Watters 75', Harkness 80'	1,807
29	4 March	Airdrieonians	H	1–1	McLaughlin 82'	2,376
30	11 March	Ayr United	A	1–2	Montgomerie 20'	5,476
31	18 March	Forfar Athletic	H	2–2	Harkness 8', Faulds 14'	1,586
32	25 March	Dunfermline Athletic	A	0–0		5,906
33	1 April	Falkirk	H	0–0		3,870
34	8 April	Meadowbank Thistle	A	2–1	Harkness 36', Watters 79'	866
35	15 April	Raith Rovers	H	1–2	Harkness 16'	2,218
36	22 April	Greenock Morton	A	0–3		1,623
37	29 April	Partick Thistle	H	0–0		2,932
38	6 May	Clydebank	A	2–3	Harkness 1', Stewart 21'	1,811
39	13 May	Queen of the South	A	6–0	Watters 39', 47', 54', 69', 87', Reilly 61'	1,570

== Scottish League Cup ==
Round	Date	Opponent	H/A	Score	Kilmarnock scorer(s)	Attendance
R2	17 August	Forfar Athletic	H	1–0	Gilmour 55' pen.	1,523
R3	23 August	Hibernian	A	0–1		10,000

== Scottish Cup ==
Round	Date	Opponent	H/A	Score	Kilmarnock scorer(s)	Attendance
R3	28 January	Queen of the South	A	2–2	Watters 10', Speirs 90'	2,941
R3R	1 February	Queen of the South	H	0–1		5,623

== See also ==
- List of Kilmarnock F.C. seasons
