= 1967–68 Kilmarnock F.C. season =

Kilmarnock
1967–68 season
- Manager: Malky MacDonald until March 1968; Walter McCrae from March 1968
- Scottish Division One: 7th
- Scottish Cup: 1R
- Scottish League Cup: QF
- Top goalscorer: League: Eddie Morrison & Gerry Queen, 14; All: Kenny Cameron, 19
- Highest home attendance: 18,591 (v Celtic, 2 March)
- Lowest home attendance: 2,333 (v Motherwell, 16 March)
- Average home league attendance: 5,694 (down 2,745)

The 1967–68 season was Kilmarnock's 66th in Scottish League competitions.

== Scottish Division One ==
=== League table ===
Pos	Team	Pld	W	D	L	GF	GA	GD	Pts
5	Aberdeen	34	16	5	13	63	48	+15	37
6	Morton	34	15	6	13	57	53	+4	36
7	Kilmarnock	34	13	8	13	59	57	+2	34
8	Clyde	34	15	4	15	55	55	0	34
9	Dundee	34	13	7	14	62	59	+3	33

Source: "1967-1968 First Division - SPFL Archive". SPFL.

=== Match results ===
Match Day	Date	Opponent	H/A	Score	Kilmarnock scorer(s)	Attendance
1	9 September	Morton	H	3–1	Murray 32', 52', McInally 33'	7,508
2	16 September	Stirling Albion	A	0–0		2,636
3	23 September	Airdrieonians	H	2–2	Cameron 32', 80'	4,452
4	30 September	Dunfermline Athletic	A	2–1	McInally 42', McIlroy 64'	3,987
5	7 October	Dundee	H	0–0		4,640
6	14 October	Falkirk	A	1–1	McIlroy 20'	3,227
7	21 October	Raith Rovers	H	1–2	Cameron 27'	3,286
8	28 October	Clyde	A	1–2	McIlroy 70'	1,663
9	11 November	Partick Thistle	H	0–3		2,719
10	15 November	Celtic	A	0–3		26,727
11	18 November	Motherwell	A	2–1	Cameron 60', Morrison 90'	2,270
12	25 November	Dundee United	A	2–3	Morrison 50', McLean 72'	5,144
13	2 December	Heart of Midlothian	H	3–2	Queen 9', Morrison 30', 70'	5,558
14	9 December	Aberdeen	H	3–0	Queen 20', Morrison 51', 75'	4,834
15	16 December	St Johnstone	A	1–0	Cameron 45'	2,439
16	23 December	Rangers	A	1–4	Cameron 90'	33,239
17	30 December	Hibernian	H	1–0	McLean 60'	6,460
18	1 January	Morton	A	2–3	Queen 57' pen., Morrison 65'	3,762
19	2 January	Stirling Albion	H	5–2	Queen 28' pen., Morrison 38', 75', McIlroy 50', Thomson 87' o.g.	4,743
20	20 January	Dundee	A	5–6	Morrison 10', 13', McIlroy 76' Cameron 86', 90'	6,310
21	3 February	Falkirk	H	3–0	Morrison 4', Queen 81', Cameron 90'	2,400
22	6 February	Dunfermline Athletic	H	1–1	Queen 88'	3,056
23	10 February	Raith Rovers	A	2–1	Queen 64' pen., Cameron 82'	2,836
24	21 February	Airdrieonians	A	2–3	Queen 32' pen., Gilmour 62'	2,322
25	28 February	Clyde	H	5–1	Queen 2', 47', McLean 70', Cameron 82', Gilmour 89'	2,968
26	2 March	Celtic	H	0–6		18,591
27	13 March	Partick Thistle	A	0–1		1,700
28	16 March	Motherwell	H	1–1	Queen 15'	2,333
29	6 April	Aberdeen	A	1–1	Morrison 6'	5,465
30	10 April	Heart of Midlothian F.C.	A	0–1		6,000
31	13 April	St Johnstone	H	1–0	Morrison 35'	2,939
32	17 April	Dundee United	H	4–0	McFadzean 34', Dickson 65' Queen 68', 78',	3,020
33	20 April	Rangers	H	1–2	McFadzean 10'	17,286
34	27 April	Hibernian	A	3–3	McLean 38', Queen 48', McFadzean 60'	4,688

=== Scottish League Cup ===
==== Group stage ====
Round	Date	Opponent	H/A	Score	Kilmarnock scorer(s)	Attendance
G1	12 August	Dunfermline Athletic	H	2–2	Cameron 17', McInally 75'	7,269
G1	16 August	Airdrieonians	A	2–1	Cameron 15', McInally 65'	2,596
G1	19 August	Partick Thistle	H	4–0	Cameron 31', 44', 65', McLean 69'	5,892
G1	26 August	Dunfermline Athletic	A	3–1	Cameron 3', 45', 59'	8,155
G1	30 August	Airdrieonians	H	0–0		5,687
G1	2 September	Partick Thistle	A	0–1		3,432

==== Group 1 final table ====
P	Team	Pld	W	D	L	GF	GA	GD	Pts
1	Kilmarnock	6	3	2	1	11	5	6	8
2	Dunfermline Athletic	6	2	2	2	11	12	−1	6
3	Airdrieonians	6	2	1	3	7	8	−1	5
4	Partick Thistle	6	2	1	3	6	10	−4	5

==== Knockout stage ====
Round	Date	Opponent	H/A	Score	Kilmarnock scorer(s)	Attendance
QF L1	13 September	Morton	A	2–3	Queen 8', McLean 30'	8,777
QF L2	27 September	Morton	H	1–2	McInally 59'	14,344

=== Scottish Cup ===
Round	Date	Opponent	H/A	Score	Kilmarnock scorer(s)	Attendance
R1	27 January	Partick Thistle	A	0–0		9,800
R1R	31 January	Partick Thistle	H	1–2	Morrison 53'	9,191

== See also ==
- List of Kilmarnock F.C. seasons
