= 1968–69 Kilmarnock F.C. season =

Kilmarnock
1968–69 season
- Manager: Walter McCrae
- Scottish Division One: 4th
- Scottish Cup: QF
- Scottish League Cup: GS
- Top goalscorer: League: Eddie Morrison & Brien McIlroy, 13; All: Eddie Morrison 16
- Highest home attendance: 32,893 (v Rangers, 4 January)
- Lowest home attendance: 4,069 (v Airdrieonians, 29 March)
- Average home league attendance: 8,294 (up 2,600)

The 1968–69 season was Kilmarnock's 67th in Scottish League Competitions.

== Scottish Division One ==
=== League table ===
Pos	Team	Pld	W	D	L	GF	GA	GD	Pts
2	Rangers	34	21	7	6	81	32	+49	49
3	Dunfermline Athletic	34	19	7	8	63	45	+18	45
4	Kilmarnock	34	15	14	5	50	32	+18	44
5	Dundee United	34	17	9	8	61	49	+12	43
6	St Johnstone	34	16	5	13	66	59	+7	37

Source: "1968-1969 First Division - SPFL Archive". SPFL.

=== Match results ===
Match Day	Date	Opponent	H/A	Score	Kilmarnock scorer(s)	Attendance
1	7 September	St Mirren	A	1–1	Queen 18'	5,204
2	14 September	Morton	H	1–0	Morrison 70'	5,812
3	21 September	Rangers	A	3–3	Morrison 30', 58', Queen 85' pen.	39,407
4	28 September	Dunfermline Athletic	H	0–1		6,507
5	5 October	Arbroath	A	2–1	J.McLean 42', 49'	3,015
6	12 October	Dundee United	H	3–0	Morrison 5', T.McLean 8', J.McLean 40'	5,151
7	19 October	Hibernian	A	0–1		8,653
8	26 October	Raith Rovers	H	4–4	T.McLean 58' pen., 89', Morrison 67', McIlroy 84'	4,565
9	2 November	Heart of Midlothian	A	1–0	T.McLean 87'	6,943
10	9 November	Falkirk	H	5–1	J.McLean 45', McIlroy 46', 52', 83', Morrison 87'	4,340
11	16 November	Partick Thistle	A	2–0	McIlroy 53', Queen 78'	4,400
12	23 November	Dundee	H	1–0	Morrison 20'	6,594
13	30 November	Clyde	A	1–2	Morrison 2'	3,824
14	7 December	Airdrieonians	A	2–0	Morrison 46', McIlroy 49'	2,759
15	14 December	St Johnstone	H	2–0	Morrison 10', J.McLean 63'	5,154
16	21 December	Celtic	A	1–1	McIlroy 60'	37,321
17	28 December	Aberdeen	H	2–1	McIlroy 10', Morrison 51'	7,128
18	1 January	St Mirren	H	0–0		12,082
19	2 January	Morton	A	2–3	McIlroy 45', 64'	7,300
20	4 January	Rangers	H	3–3	Dickson 15', T.McLean 45' pen., McIlroy 74'	32,893
21	11 January	Dunfermline Athletic	A	1–1	W.Callaghan 38' o.g.	8,662
22	18 January	Arbroath	H	1–0	J.McLean 62'	5,544
23	1 February	Dundee United	A	2–2	Queen 3', Morrison 51'	5,076
24	19 February	Hibernian	H	2–1	McIlroy 28', Queen 60'	5,673
25	22 February	Heart of Midlothian	H	1–0	McIlroy 81'	7,025
26	26 February	Raith Rovers	A	0–0		2,246
27	8 March	Partick Thistle	H	1–1	McFadzean 59'	4,541
28	12 March	Falkirk	A	1–1	Dickson 34'	2,838
29	15 March	Dundee	A	0–0		4,345
30	22 March	Clyde	H	0–0		5,042
31	29 March	Airdrieonians	H	2–1	Gilmour 2', McKellar 88'	4,069
32	5 April	St Johnstone	A	0–1		3,748
33	19 April	Aberdeen	A	1–0	Cook 38'	7,502
34	21 April	Celtic	H	2–2	Morrison 9', Queen 31'	18,873

=== Scottish League Cup ===
==== Group stage ====
Round	Date	Opponent	H/A	Score	Kilmarnock scorer(s)	Attendance
G2	10 August	Dundee	A	0–4		7,648
G2	14 August	Airdrieonians	H	0–3		5,446
G2	17 August	Heart of Midlothian	H	3–3	Queen 11', 16' pen., Cook 35'	7,213
G2	24 August	Dundee	H	2–2	Morrison 61', T.McLean 81'	5,435
G2	28 August	Airdrieonians	A	0–2		3,692
G2	31 August	Heart of Midlothian	A	0–0		6,283

==== Group 3 final table ====
P	Team	Pld	W	D	L	GF	GA	GD	Pts
1	Dundee	6	3	2	1	15	5	10	8
2	Airdrieonians	6	3	1	2	10	7	3	7
3	Heart of Midlothian	6	2	2	2	8	12	−4	6
4	Kilmarnock	6	0	3	3	5	14	−9	3

=== Scottish Cup ===
Round	Date	Opponent	H/A	Score	Kilmarnock scorer(s)	Attendance
R1	27 January	Glasgow University	H	6–0	Queen 1', 53', 85', McIlroy 33', 76', Hope 69' o.g.	7,771
R2	8 February	Montrose	A	1–1	Morrison 60'	2,600
R2	8 February	Montrose	H	4–1	T.McLean 16', 45', 90', Morrison 34'	7,385
QF	1 March	Aberdeen	A	0–0		22,601
QF	1 March	Aberdeen	H	0–3		18,128

== See also ==
- List of Kilmarnock F.C. seasons
