= 1891–92 Kilmarnock F.C. season =

Kilmarnock
1891–92 season
- Stadium: Rugby Park
- Scottish Alliance: Runners-up
- Scottish Cup: Second round
- Ayrshire Cup: Third round
- Kilmarnock Merchants' Charity Cup: Winners
Home colours

Season 1891–92 was the 19th season of competitive football by Kilmarnock.

== Overview ==
Kilmarnock were founder members of the Scottish Football Alliance and finished second in its inaugural season. They reached the second round of the Scottish Cup after a 6–1 win away to East Stirlingshire but were eliminated after a second replay by Scottish Football League side Rangers.

The defence of Kilmarnock's Ayrshire Cup win from the previous season began with convincing wins against Lanemark - 5–1 at Rugby Park - and Stewarton Cunninghame - 14–0 at Standalone Park. The run came to an end after a 4–3 home defeat to Annbank in the third round.

There was success in the Kilmarnock Merchants' Charity Cup as Kilmarnock lifted the trophy for the third time after defeating Kilmarnock Athletic 5–0 in the semi-final and Hurlford 2–1 in the final.

== Scottish Alliance ==
Date	Opponents	H / A	Result F–A	Scorers	Attendance	League position
15 August 1891	Thistle	H	5–1			
22 August 1891	Port Glasgow Athletic	A	6–3			
29 August 1891	East Stirlingshire	A	4–3			
12 September 1891	Airdrieonians	H	6–1			
19 September 1891	St Bernard's	A	2–3			
26 September 1891	Northern	H	5–2			
10 October 1891	Port Glasgow Athletic	H	0–0			
24 October 1891	Linthouse	H	2–0			
5 December 1891	Ayr	H	7–0			
6 February 1892	Morton	H	8–1			
13 February 1892	Partick Thistle	A	2–3			
27 February 1892	King's Park	H	4–1			
5 March 1892	Linthouse	A	1–3			
19 March 1892	Northern	A	0–2			
26 March 1892	East Stirlingshire	H	5–0			
2 April 1892	King's Park	A	3–5			
9 April 1892	St Bernard's	H	1–0			
16 April 1892	Thistle	A	3–2			
23 April 1892	Morton	A	3–3			
30 April 1892	Partick Thistle	H	5–0			
7 May 1892	Airdrieonains	A	2–5			
14 May 1892	Ayr	A	1–1			

Notes

1. A- East Stirlingshire refused to play the second half due to sleet and Kilmarnock were awarded the match.

=== League table ===
Pos	Team	Pld	W	D	L	GF	GA	GD	Pts	Qualification or relegation
1	Linthouse (C)	22	15	3	4	88	51	+37	33	Champions
2	Kilmarnock	22	13	3	6	75	39	+36	29	
3	Morton	22	12	3	7	62	67	−5	27	
4	St Bernard's	22	11	4	7	63	45	+18	26	
5	Northern	22	9	4	9	76	71	+5	22	
6	Airdrieonians	22	8	5	9	66	66	0	21	
7	Port Glasgow Athletic	22	7	6	9	54	56	−2	20	
8	Ayr	22	8	4	10	65	70	−5	20	
9	Partick Thistle	22	8	3	11	48	66	−18	19	
10	East Stirlingshire	22	7	4	11	62	81	−19	18	
11	King's Park	22	7	1	14	60	79	−19	15	
12	Thistle	22	5	4	13	55	83	−28	14	

Rules for classification: 1) Points
(C) Champions

== Scottish Cup ==
Date	Round	Opponents	H / A	Result F–A	Scorers	Attendance
28 November 1891	First round	East Stirlingshire	A	6–1	Campbell, Tannahill (2), McAvoy	3,000
19 December 1891	Second round	Rangers	A	0–0		2,000
26 December 1891	Second round replay	Rangers	H	1–1	Brodie	3,000
23 January 1892	Second round second replay	Rangers	N	2–3	Kelvin, McPherson	5,000

== Ayrshire Cup ==
Date	Round	Opponents	H / A	Result F–A	Scorers	Attendance
31 October 1891	First round	Lanemark	H	5–1		
21 November 1891	Second round	Stewarton Cunninghame	A	14–0		
12 December 1891	Third round	Annbank	H	3–4		

== Kilmarnock Merchants' Charity Cup ==
Date	Round	Opponents	H / A	Result F–A	Scorers	Attendance
26 April 1892	Semi-final	Kilmarnock Athletic	H	5–0		
21 May 1892	Final	Hurlford	H	2–1		
