= Hugh Burns (footballer, born 1965) =

Scottish footballer

Personal information
- Full name: Hugh Burns
- Date of birth: 13 December 1965 (age 60)
- Place of birth: Lanark, Scotland
- Position: Defender

Youth career
- Cambuslang Rangers

Senior career*
Years	Team	Apps	(Gls)
1983–1987	Rangers	52	(4)
1986–1987	→ Hamilton Academical (loan)	5	(1)
1987–1988	Heart of Midlothian	24	(0)
1988–1990	Dunfermline Athletic	15	(0)
1989–1990	→ Fulham (loan)	6	(0)
1990–1991	Hamilton Academical	33	(6)
1991–1993	Kilmarnock	41	(4)
1993–1995	Ayr United	58	(5)
1995–1996	Dumbarton	11	(1)

International career
1985	Scotland U21	2	(0)
- * Club domestic league appearances and goals

Hugh Burns (born 13 December 1965) is a Scottish former professional footballer who is best known for his time with Rangers and Kilmarnock.

== Club career ==
Burns began his career with Cambuslang Rangers before joining Rangers. Whilst at Ibrox he made over fifty appearances in the league and played both legs in a UEFA Cup game against CA Osasuna in 1985. He signed for Hamilton Academical on loan the following season then moved on to Heart of Midlothian in 1987.

He had spells at Dunfermline Athletic, Fulham (at that time in the third tier in England) and second spell with Hamilton Academical. In 1991, he joined Kilmarnock and made over forty appearances, then switched to Ayrshire rivals Ayr United. A two-year spell at Somerset Park saw him play over sixty games before winding down his career with Dumbarton. He then moved back to the Junior leagues with Larkhall Thistle.

== Media work ==
Burns is a pundit on the Talking Football programme on Rock Sport Radio.
