= Derek Anderson (footballer) =

Scottish footballer (born 1972)

Personal information
- Date of birth: 15 May 1972 (age 54)
- Place of birth: Paisley, Scotland
- Position: Defender

Team information
- Current team: Greenock Morton (Head of Youth Development and Interim Manager)

Youth career
- Ferguslie United
- 1991–1992: Greenock Morton
- 1992–1994: Kilwinning Rangers

Senior career*
Years	Team	Apps	(Gls)
1994–1998	Kilmarnock	66	(1)
1998	Ayr United	12	(1)
1998–1999	Hibernian	6	(0)
1999–2001	Greenock Morton	74	(5)
2001–2002	Alloa Athletic	10	(0)
2002–2003	Queen of the South	39	(0)
2003–2004	Stirling Albion	28	(0)
- Auchinleck Talbot
Total		235	(7)

Managerial career
- 2013: Greenock Morton (Interim Manager)
- 2018: Greenock Morton (Interim Manager)
- 2021: Greenock Morton (Interim Manager)
- * Club domestic league appearances and goals

Derek Anderson (born 15 May 1972 in Paisley) is a Scottish former professional footballer, who played as a defender for Greenock Morton, Kilmarnock, Ayr United, Hibernian, Alloa Athletic, Queen of the South and Stirling Albion.

Anderson was appointed director of Greenock Morton's youth academy in March 2012. In November 2013, he and David Hopkin took interim charge at Morton after Allan Moore was relieved of his role as manager. He again took caretaker charge of the first team in September 2018, along with John Sutton. In December 2021, following the release of manager Gus MacPherson, Anderson once again took the reins as caretaker manager of Morton.
