= 1892–93 Kilmarnock F.C. season =

Kilmarnock
1892–93 season
- Stadium: Rugby Park
- Scottish Alliance: Seventh place
- Scottish Cup: Second round
- Ayrshire Cup: Second round
- Kilmarnock Merchants' Charity Cup: Runners-up
Home colours

Season 1892–93 was the 20th season of competitive football by Kilmarnock.

== Overview ==
For the second consecutive season, Kilmarnock competed in the Scottish Football Alliance and finished seventh out of 10 teams. They reached the second round of the Scottish Cup after a 2–1 win against to Albion Rovers at Meadow Park but were eliminated in the second round by Queen's Park.

Kilmarnock also suffered a second round defeat in the Ayrshire Cup. After receiving a bye in the first round, they lost 5–4 to Ayr Parkhouse. Killie's defence of the Kilmarnock Merchants' Charity Cup ended at the final hurdle as they lost 5–2 to Annbank in the final.

== Scottish Alliance ==
Date	Opponents	H / A	Result F–A	Scorers	Attendance	League position
13 August 1892	Vale of Leven	A	6–1			
20 August 1892	Partick Thistle	H	6–2			
27 August 1892	Linthouse	A	4–6			
3 September 1892	Northern	A	5–3			
10 September 1892	Airdrieonians	A	0–4			
17 September 1892	Vale of Leven	H	2–2			
24 September 1892	St Bernard's	H	1–3			
1 October 1892	Cowlairs	A	1–3			
22 October 1892	Linthouse	H	2–3			
12 November 1892	Thistle	A	2–0			
11 February 1893	Cambuslang	A	2–2			
18 February 1893	Thistle	H	2–3			
25 February 1893	Partick Thistle	A	0–2			
25 March 1893	Cambuslang	H	3–3			
1 April 1893	St Bernard's	A	0–0			
15 April 1893	Thistle	A	1–2			
22 April 1893	Northern	H	2–3			
29 April 1893	Cowlairs	H	3–3			
13 May 1893	Airdrieonians	H	1–6			

Notes

1. A- Match declared void and replayed on 18 February 1893.
2. B- Kilmarnock's home match against Airdrieonians was played at Broomfield Park, Airdrie.

== Scottish Cup ==
Date	Round	Opponents	H / A	Result F–A	Scorers	Attendance
26 November 1892	First round	Albion Rovers	A	2–1	Todd (2)	
28 January 1893	Second round	Queen's Park	H	0–8		4,000

== Ayrshire Cup ==
Date	Round	Opponents	H / A	Result F–A	Scorers	Attendance
October 1892	First round	Bye				
29 October 1892	Second round	Ayr Parkhouse	A	4–5		

== Kilmarnock Merchants' Charity Cup ==
Date	Round	Opponents	H / A	Result F–A	Scorers	Attendance
6 May 1893	Semi-final	Kilbirnie	H	0–3		
10 June 1893	Final	Annbank	H	2–5		

Notes

1. C- Abandoned after 50 minutes due to fighting. Kilmarnock advanced to the final.
