= 1895–96 Scottish Division Two =

Scottish Second Division
- Season: 1895–96
- Champions: Abercorn
- Promoted: Abercorn

The 1895–96 Scottish Second Division was won by Abercorn with Linthouse finishing bottom.

== Table ==
Pos	Team	Pld	W	D	L	GF	GA	GD	Pts	Promotion or relegation
1	Abercorn (C, P)	18	12	3	3	55	31	+24	27	Promoted to the 1896–97 Scottish First Division
2	Leith Athletic	18	11	1	6	55	37	+18	23	
3	Kilmarnock	18	10	1	7	51	46	+5	21	
3	Renton	18	9	3	6	40	28	+12	21	
5	Airdrieonians	18	7	4	7	48	44	+4	18	
5	Partick Thistle	18	8	2	8	46	54	−8	18	
7	Port Glasgow Athletic	18	6	4	8	40	41	−1	16	
8	Motherwell	18	5	3	10	31	52	−21	13	
9	Morton	18	4	4	10	32	42	−10	12	
10	Linthouse	18	5	1	12	26	49	−23	11	

Source: statto.com
Rules for classification: Teams finish equal if level on points. Points system: 2 points for a win, 1 point for a draw, 0 points for a loss.
(C) Champions; (P) Promoted
