= 1870s Kilmarnock F.C. seasons =

== 1873–74 season ==
Kilmarnock
1873–74 season
- Stadium: Rugby Park; The Grange; Holm Quarry
- Scottish Cup: First round
Home colours

The 1873–74 season was the first season of competitive football by Kilmarnock.

=== Overview ===
As founder members of the Scottish FA, Kilmarnock were one of 16 teams to enter the first edition of the Scottish Cup in 1873. They were involved in the first ever match in the competition when they took on Renton at the neutral Hampden Park in Crosshill on 18 October 1873. Killie - who played the entire match with 10 men - were not used to playing under association rules and lost 2–0.

During the club's early years, the team would play in Oxford blue shirts, white shorts and Oxford blue socks. The now traditional blue and white vertical stripes weren't introduced until 1896.

=== Scottish Cup ===
Date	Round	Opponents	H / A	Result F–A	Scorers	Attendance
18 October 1873	First round	Renton	N	0–2		

=== Friendlies ===
Date	Opponents	H / A	Result F–A	Scorers	Attendance
6 December 1873	Queen's Park	H	0–9		
27 December 1873	Paisley Craiglea	H	1–0	P. Brown	
9 April 1874	Bellahouston Wanderers	H	2–2		

== 1874–75 season ==
Kilmarnock
1874–75 season
- Stadium: The Grange
- Scottish Cup: Second Round
Home colours

The 1874–75 season was the second season of competitive football by Kilmarnock.

=== Overview ===
Kilmarnock entered the Scottish Cup for the second time. They bettered their previous performance in the competition after a 4–0 win at home to Vale of Leven Rovers in the first round. However, they then lost 3–0 at The Grange to Eastern in the second round.

=== Scottish Cup ===
Date	Round	Opponents	H / A	Result F–A	Scorers	Attendance
17 October 1874	First round	Vale of Leven Rovers	H	4–0	Sturrock, D. Brown, Wallace, unknown	
21 November 1874	Second round	Eastern	H	0–3		

=== Friendlies ===
Date	Opponents	H / A	Result F–A	Scorers	Attendance
10 October 1874	Queen's Park	A	0–7		
23 January 1875	Queen's Park	H	0–2		

== 1875–76 season ==
Kilmarnock
1875–76 season
- Stadium: The Grange
- Scottish Cup: Second Round
Home colours

The 1875–76 season was the third season of competitive football by Kilmarnock.

=== Overview ===
Kilmarnock entered the Scottish Cup for the third time. They equalled their previous best performance in the competition after an 8–0 win at home to Ayr Eglinton in the first round. However, they then lost 6–0 at Kinning Park to Clydesdale in the second round.

=== Scottish Cup ===
Date	Round	Opponents	H / A	Result F–A	Scorers	Attendance
9 October 1875	First round	Ayr Eglinton	H	8–0	A. Ferguson, unknown	
6 November 1875	Second round	Clydesdale	A	0–6		

== 1876–77 season ==
Kilmarnock
1876–77 season
- Stadium: Holm Quarry
- Scottish Cup: Second Round
Home colours

The 1876–77 season was the fourth season of competitive football by Kilmarnock.

=== Overview ===
Kilmarnock entered the Scottish Cup for the fourth time. They equalled their previous best performance in the competition after receiving a bye in the first round. However, they then lost 2–1 at Holm Quarry to Mauchline in the second round.

=== Scottish Cup ===
Date	Round	Opponents	H / A	Result F–A	Scorers	Attendance
September 1876	First round	Bye				
21 October 1876	Second round	Mauchline	H	1–2	Thomson	

== 1877–78 season ==
Kilmarnock
1877–78 season
- Stadium: The Grange; Rugby Park
- Scottish Cup: Second Round
- Ayrshire Cup: Second Round
Home colours

The 1877–78 season was the fifth season of competitive football by Kilmarnock.

=== Overview ===
Kilmarnock entered the Scottish Cup for the fifth time and competed in the inaugural Ayrshire Cup. They equalled their previous best performance in the Scottish Cup after a 5–1 win at home to Hurlford in the first round. However, they then lost 1–0 at Springvale Park to Ayr Academicals in the second round. Killie also reached the second round of the Ayrshire Cup where they lost 4–1 to Mauchline.

=== Scottish Cup ===
Date	Round	Opponents	H / A	Result F–A	Scorers	Attendance
29 September 1877	First round	Hurlford	H	5–1		
20 October 1877	Second round	Ayr Academicals	A	0–1		

=== Ayrshire Cup ===
Date	Round	Opponents	H / A	Result F–A	Scorers	Attendance
1 December 1877	First round	Dalry Rangers	H	5–1		
12 January 1878	Second round	Mauchline	H	0–4		

== 1878–79 season ==
Kilmarnock
1878–79 season
- Stadium: Rugby Park
- Scottish Cup: First Round
- Ayrshire Cup: First Round
Home colours

The 1878–79 season was the sixth season of competitive football by Kilmarnock.

=== Overview ===
Kilmarnock entered the Scottish Cup for the sixth time and also competed in the Ayrshire Cup. In both competitions, they were knocked out in the first round, losing 2–0 to Kilbirnie in the Scottish Cup and 7–0 to Mauchline in the Ayrshire Cup.

=== Scottish Cup ===
Date	Round	Opponents	H / A	Result F–A	Scorers	Attendance
28 September 1878	First round	Kilbirnie	H	0–2		

=== Ayrshire Cup ===
Date	Round	Opponents	H / A	Result F–A	Scorers	Attendance
16 November 1878	First round	Mauchline	H	0–7		

=== Friendlies ===
Date	Opponents	H / A	Result F–A	Scorers	Attendance
8 November 1878	Kilmarnock Portland	H	0–3		

== 1879–80 season ==
Kilmarnock
1879–80 season
- Stadium: Rugby Park
- Scottish Cup: Second Round
- Ayrshire Cup: Third Round
Home colours

The 1879–80 season was the seventh season of competitive football by Kilmarnock.

=== Overview ===
Kilmarnock entered the Scottish Cup for the seventh time and also competed in the Ayrshire Cup. They equalled their previous best performance in the Scottish Cup after a walkover victory against Ayr Academicals in the first round. However, they then lost 6–2 at Connell Park to Mauchline in the second round. Killie bettered their previous best performance in the Ayrshire Cup after they defeated Ayr Athole and Kilmarnock Arthurlie to reach the third round where they lost 1–0 to Kilmarnock Portland.

=== Scottish Cup ===
Date	Round	Opponents	H / A	Result F–A	Scorers	Attendance
September 1879	First round	Ayr Academicals	w/o			
11 October 1879	Second round	Mauchline	A	2–6		

=== Ayrshire Cup ===
Date	Round	Opponents	H / A	Result F–A	Scorers	Attendance
October 1879	First round	Ayr Athole	H	6–1		
22 November 1879	Second round	Kilmarnock Arthurlie	A	5–0		
27 December 1879	Third round	Kilmarnock Portland	A	0–1		

== Notes ==
Notes

1. A-The original Rugby Park was located near Dundonald Road, Kilmarnock to the west of the current stadium.
