= Brien McIlroy =

Scottish footballer

Personal information
- Full name: James Brien McIlroy
- Date of birth: 28 July 1939
- Place of birth: Glasgow, Scotland
- Date of death: 6 December 1995 (aged 56)
- Place of death: Paisley, Scotland
- Height: 5 ft 6 in (1.68 m)
- Position: Outside left

Youth career
- Wallace Castle Rovers

Senior career*
Years	Team	Apps	(Gls)
1957–1960	Rangers	0	(0)
1957–1958	→ Kirkintilloch Rob Roy (loan)		
1960	Third Lanark	0	(0)
1960–1969	Kilmarnock	216	(105)
1969–1970	Aberdeen	7	(0)

International career
1964	SFA trial v SFL	1	(1)
- * Club domestic league appearances and goals

James Brien McIlroy (28 July 1939 – 1995) was a Scottish footballer who played as an outside left, primarily for Kilmarnock, with whom he won the Scottish Football League in 1964–65; it was his goal in the decisive match against Heart of Midlothian which won Killie the championship on goal average.

McIlroy is Kilmarnock's third-highest goalscorer of all time, and the annual club award for seasonal top scorer is named in his honour.
