= Gerry Queen =

Scottish footballer

Personal information
- Full name: Gerald Queen
- Date of birth: 15 January 1945 (age 81)
- Place of birth: Glasgow, Scotland
- Height: 6 ft 0 in (1.83 m)
- Position: Forward

Youth career
- Johnstone Burgh

Senior career*
Years	Team	Apps	(Gls)
1962–1965	St Mirren	63	(10)
1965–1969	Kilmarnock	95	(29)
1969–1972	Crystal Palace	108	(24)
1972–1977	Orient	156	(34)
Total		422	(97)
- * Club domestic league appearances and goals

Gerald Queen (born 15 January 1945) is a Scottish retired footballer who played as a forward.

Born in Glasgow, he began his senior career with St Mirren, having played at amateur level with Johnstone Burgh. He made 63 appearances in three years with the club, scoring ten goals, before moving to Kilmarnock in 1965. Queen scored 29 goals over the next four years in 95 matches. He moved to England in 1969 to sign for Crystal Palace, where he scored 24 goals in 108 appearances. His last senior club was Orient, who he joined in 1972. He played in 156 matches for the club over the next five years, scoring 34 goals, before moving to South Africa.

Queen settled in the US managing Cocoa Expos, Florida from 2001 to 2006.
