= Bobby Houston (footballer, born 1952) =

Scottish footballer

Personal information
- Date of birth: 21 January 1952 (age 74)
- Place of birth: Glasgow, Scotland
- Positions: Right winger; right back

Youth career
- Rutherglen Glencairn

Senior career*
Years	Team	Apps	(Gls)
1972–1980	Partick Thistle	186	(18)
1980–1981	Kilmarnock	40	(7)
1981–1984	Greenock Morton	106	(8)
Total		332	(33)

International career
1978	Scottish League XI	1	(0)
- * Club domestic league appearances and goals

Bobby Houston (born 1952) is a Scottish former footballer, who played for Partick Thistle, Kilmarnock and Greenock Morton.
