= Jimmy Gilmour =

Scottish footballer (born 1961)

Personal information
- Date of birth: 17 December 1961 (age 64)
- Place of birth: Bellshill, Scotland
- Position: Winger

Youth career
- Bargeddie Amateurs

Senior career*
| Years | Team | Apps | (Gls) |
| 1981–1984 | Queen's Park | 107 | (27) |
| 1984–1985 | Partick Thistle | 17 | (0) |
| 1985–1988 | Falkirk | 79 | (21) |
| 1988–1989 | Kilmarnock | 44 | (11) |
| 1989–1990 | Stirling Albion | 33 | (3) |
| 1990–1991 | Clyde | 28 | (6) |
| 1991–1994 | Dumbarton | 48 | (20) |
| 1994–1995 | Bo'ness United | | |
| 1995–1999 | Alloa Athletic | 71 | (6) |
- Fauldhouse United
| Total | | 427 | (94) |
- * Club domestic league appearances and goals

Jimmy Gilmour (born 17 December 1961) is a Scottish former professional footballer who played in the 1980s and 1990s.

== Career ==
Born in Bellshill, Gilmour played for Bargeddie Amateurs, Queen's Park, Partick Thistle, Falkirk, Kilmarnock, Stirling Albion, Clyde, Dumbarton, Bo'ness United, Alloa Athletic and Fauldhouse United.
