= Shaun McSkimming =

Scottish footballer

Personal information
- Full name: Shaun Peter McSkimming
- Date of birth: 29 May 1970 (age 56)
- Place of birth: Stranraer, Scotland
- Position: Midfielder

Youth career
- 1986–1987: Stranraer

Senior career*
Years	Team	Apps	(Gls)
1987–1991	Dundee	24	(3)
1991–1994	Kilmarnock	113	(9)
1994–1998	Motherwell	64	(7)
1998–2001	Dundee	63	(4)
2001–2002	Atlanta Silverbacks	??	(??)
2002	Peterhead	9	(1)
2002–2005	Peterhead	57	(0)
Total		330	(24)

International career
1994	Scotland B	1	(0)
- * Club domestic league appearances and goals as of 18:36, 17 January 2018 (UTC)

Shaun McSkimming (born 29 May 1970 in Stranraer) is a Scottish former footballer who played as a left-sided attacking midfielder for Dundee, Kilmarnock, Motherwell and Peterhead in Scotland as well as Atlanta Silverbacks in the USA.

== Club career ==
McSkimming signed for Dundee at the start of the 1987–88 season and remained at Dens Park for 4 years, where he played in 24 league matches and scored 3 league goals.

In the close season of 1991, McSkimming signed for East Ayrshire club Kilmarnock, where he stayed for three years. McSkimming's first match for Kilmarnock was at Rugby Park on 10 August 1991 versus Stirling Albion. McSkimming proved a fair acquisition, scoring some fine goals that included a brilliant solo effort at East End Park versus Dunfermline Athletic and also the winner in a 2–1 home win versus Kilmarnock's South Ayrshire rivals Ayr United in the Scottish Cup of season 1993–94. McSkimming's last match for Kilmarnock was on 29 October 1994 versus Motherwell at Fir Park. McSkimming should arguably have scored more goals at Rugby Park but by the time he was due to depart he was being played at wing back. McSkimming played in 113 league matches and scored 9 league goals.

McSkimming signed for Motherwell in early November 1994 for £300,000. There was some disquiet when he was quoted in the media saying he had joined a bigger club to win medals. Whether he had actually said this is up for debate but McSkimming did not win any silverware at Fir Park and was always taunted by the Killie supporters whenever the two clubs played against each other. In his four years at Motherwell, McSkimming played in 64 league matches and scored 7 league goals.

McSkimming then re-signed for his first club Dundee in the close season of 1998, where he stayed for three years, playing in 63 league matches and scoring 4 goals.

In July 2001, McSkimming moved to the United States to join the Atlanta Silverbacks for six months.

On his return to Scotland in January 2002, McSkimming had a short spell at Peterhead, playing in 9 league matches and scoring one goal against Albion Rovers. After leaving at the end of the 2001–02 season, McSkimming re-signed for the Blue Toon at the start of the 2002–03 season, where he played in 57 league matches without scoring any goals in his second spell. McSkimming then retired from playing to take up a coaching post with Peterhead in the close season of 2005.

== International recognition ==
McSkimming earned a Scotland B cap away to Wales in 1994.
