= Ally Mauchlen =

Scottish footballer and manager

Personal information
- Full name: Alistair Henry Mauchlen
- Date of birth: 29 June 1960 (age 66)
- Place of birth: Kilwinning, Scotland
- Height: 5 ft 7 in (1.70 m)
- Position: Midfielder

Youth career
- Irvine Meadow

Senior career*
Years	Team	Apps	(Gls)
1978–1982	Kilmarnock	123	(10)
1982–1985	Motherwell	76	(4)
1985–1992	Leicester City	239	(11)
1992	→ Leeds United (loan)	0	(0)
1992–1994	Heart of Midlothian	18	(0)
1993–1994	→ Glenavon (loan)	15	(0)
1994–1995	Glenavon	13	(0)
1995–1996	Ballymena United	15	(0)
1996	Leicester United		
1996–????	Corby Town		
- VS Rugby
- Hinckley Town

Managerial career
- Oadby Town
- * Club domestic league appearances and goals

Alistair Henry Mauchlen (born 29 June 1960) is a Scottish former footballer who later went into coaching. Brother of Callum Mauchlen.

== Playing career ==
=== Early years in Scotland ===
Born in Kilwinning, after beginning his career with junior club Irvine Meadow, Mauchlen entered league football in August 1978 when he signed for Kilmarnock of the Scottish Football League First Division. The following season Mauchlen was a regular in a Kilmarnock side that stayed up despite being part-time and was one of the stars of a 2–0 win over Celtic in November 1979.

In October 1982 Mauchlen transferred to Motherwell where he soon gained a strong following amongst the supporters for his organisational skill and his aggression. He was appointed club captain in 1984 and helped his side to the First Division title that season. Motherwell were however suffering from financial difficulties at that time and, with Mauchlen one of their most saleable assets, it was only a matter of time before he left.

=== In England ===
Mauchlen moved to Leicester City in August 1985 as part of deal that also saw teammate Gary McAllister make the switch to Filbert Street. The deal amounted to a combined fee of £350,000. Mauchlen turned out in 239 Football League matches for the club. Mauchlen joined Leeds United on loan on 12 March 1992 but left the club at the end of that month without making a first team appearance.

=== Later career ===
Mauchlen returned to Scotland with Heart of Midlothian in 1992, making 18 league appearances. Unable to command a regular first team place, Mauchlen was loaned to Irish Football League side Glenavon in November 1993, making the move permanent the following season. He switched to Ballymena United in August 1995.

Mauchlen returned to England with non-league club Leicester United in summer 1996. In August Mauchlen scored the winning goal in their 3–2 Southern Football League Midland Division win over Grantham. The following day however it was announced in a shock move that Leicester United had been liquidated. A free agent, Mauchlen promptly signed for Corby Town. He subsequently turned out for VS Rugby and Hinckley Town.

== Coaching career ==
During the late 1990s Mauchlen managed Oadby Town. In 1997, whilst in charge at Oadby, he was offered the chance to return to Glenavon as manager but he rejected the opportunity after feeling that the contract he was offered was not satisfactory. He returned to Oadby Town around 2004 as a coach under manager Lee Adam.

As of 2011 Mauchlen is living back in Leicester where he works for British Gas. His son Iain was for a time on the books at Cowdenbeath.
