= Jim Doherty (footballer) =

Scottish footballer (1958–2024)

Personal information
- Date of birth: 13 September 1958
- Place of birth: Kilmarnock, Scotland
- Date of death: 4 August 2024 (aged 65)
- Position: Midfielder

Senior career*
Years	Team	Apps	(Gls)
1976–1981	Kilmarnock	59	(9)
1981–1987	Clyde	177	(19)
1987–1989	Queen of the South	52	(12)
1989–1990	Stranraer	8	(2)
Total		296	(42)
- * Club domestic league appearances and goals

Jim Doherty (13 September 1958 – 4 August 2024) was a Scottish footballer who played as a midfielder.

Doherty began his career with hometown team Kilmarnock, before moving to Clyde in 1981. He enjoyed the best spell of his career at Shawfield, making over 200 appearances in all competitions for the club. He had spells with Queen of the South and Stranraer, before injury forced him to retire in 1990.

Doherty died on 4 August 2024, at the age of 65.
