= Tom Brown (footballer, born 1968) =

Scottish footballer

Personal information
- Full name: Thomas Heron Brown
- Date of birth: 1 April 1968 (age 58)
- Place of birth: Glasgow, Scotland
- Position: Forward

Senior career*
Years	Team	Apps	(Gls)
- St. Anthony's
- Dalry Thistle
1991–1992	Queen of the South	0	(0)
- Glenafton Athletic
1992–1993	→ Clydebank (trial)	1	(0)
1993–1997	Kilmarnock	107	(15)
1997–2001	St Mirren	89	(10)
2001–2002	Alloa Athletic	10	(1)
2002–2003	Dumbarton	27	(1)
- Bellshill Athletic
Total		234	(27)

International career
1995	Scotland B	2	(1)
- * Club domestic league appearances and goals

Thomas Heron Brown (born 1 April 1968) is a Scottish former footballer who played as a striker for several clubs in the Scottish Football League. A Scottish Cup winner at both Senior and Junior level, he was also capped for the Scotland B side.

== Career ==
Brown began his career at Junior level with St. Anthony's and Dalry Thistle before stepping up to Queen of the South. He failed to break into the first team at Palmerston and returned to the Juniors with Glenafton Athletic. Brown played in Glens' Scottish Junior Cup final victory over Tayport in 1993 before signing for Kilmarnock in the close season.

Newly promoted Kilmarnock, under the management of Tommy Burns, were playing in the Premier Division for the first time in ten years and on the opening day of the season, Brown scored the winning goal on his debut against Dundee. He went on to make over 100 league appearances for Killie and in 1995, his form was recognised with call-ups to the Scotland B squad for games against Northern Ireland and Sweden; Brown scored the winning goal against the Swedes after coming on as a substitute. He made his last appearance for Kilmarnock in the 1997 Scottish Cup final against Falkirk where he came on as a substitute in the Ayrshire club's 1–0 victory. Brown left for St Mirren the following season in a swap deal with Martin Baker.

Brown later played for Alloa Athletic and Dumbarton before retiring in 2003. He went on to work for HM Revenue and Customs and is now living with his wife, Linda, and their three sons in Glasgow, Ewan, Cameron, and Angus.
