= Ray Montgomerie =

Scottish footballer

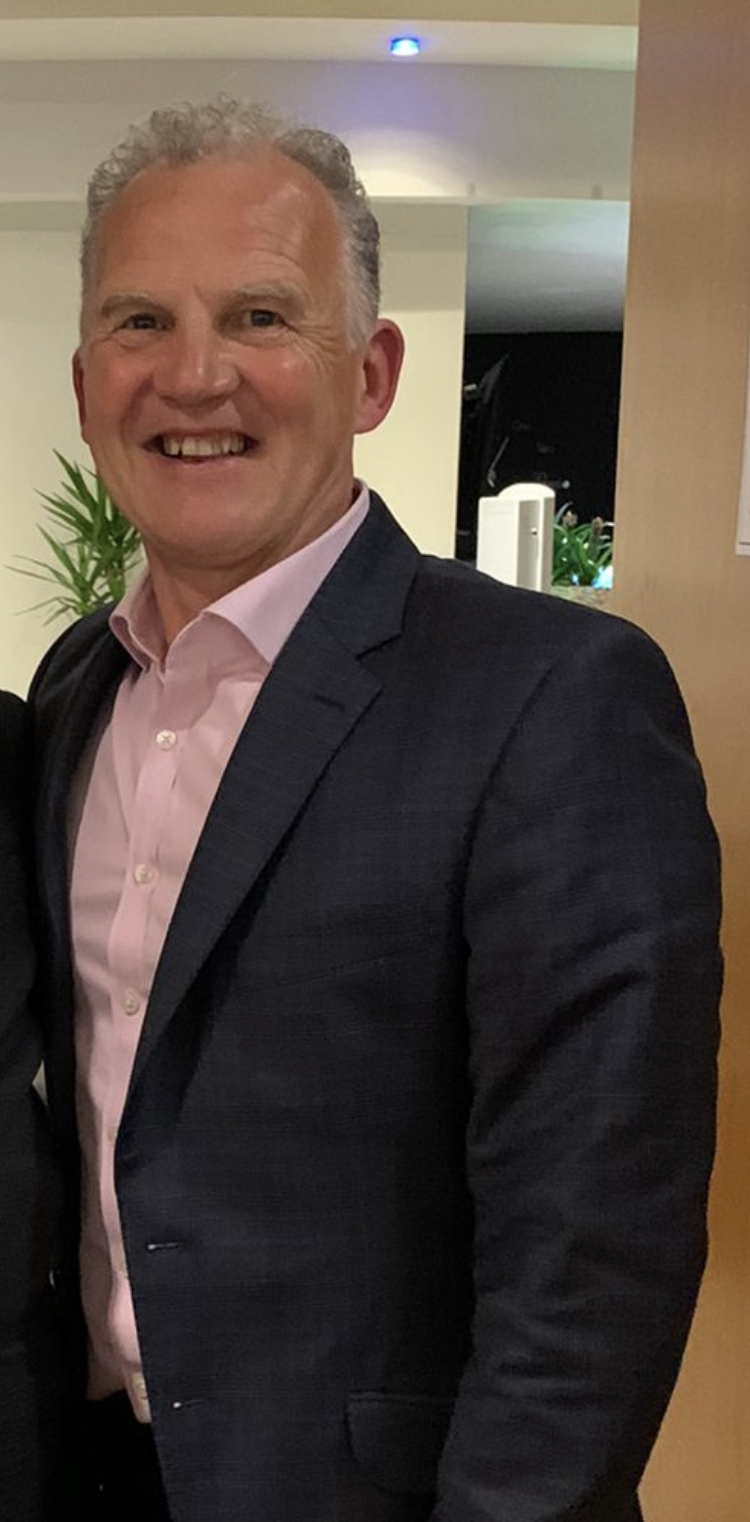

Personal information
- Full name: Samuel Raymond Montgomerie
- Date of birth: 17 April 1961 (age 65)
- Place of birth: Irvine, Scotland
- Position: Defender

Youth career
- 1979–1981: Newcastle United

Senior career*
Years	Team	Apps	(Gls)
1981–1988	Dumbarton	180	(8)
1988–1999	Kilmarnock	313	(7)
1999–2000	Partick Thistle	32	(0)
Total		525	(15)
- * Club domestic league appearances and goals

Ray Montgomerie (born 17 April 1961) is a Scottish former footballer who played as a defender for Dumbarton, Kilmarnock and Partick Thistle.

Montgomerie started out playing with his local Scottish Junior club Saltcoats Victoria before signing for Newcastle United where he spent his formative years in the senior ranks from 1979 until 1981.

After returning to Scotland, Montgomerie signed for the Sons where he played right-back for seven seasons from 1981 until 1988, having scored 8 goals in 180 league appearances.

Montgomerie then moved to Kilmarnock for £12,000 in the 1988 close season, where he was soon moved to centre-back and would be appointed the club's captain thereafter. Montgomerie's first match for Killie was in Dumfries at Palmerston Park versus Queen of the South on 13 August 1988.

Montgomerie was captain of the club that won the 1997 Scottish Cup Final at Ibrox Stadium, as he was to become a player with the East Ayrshire outfit. After just over a decade at Killie, Monty (as he was more well known) was awarded a testimonial match versus Celtic in July 1998. Montgomerie scored 7 goals in 313 league appearances for Killie.

In a poll conducted by Football Focus in 2005, Montgomerie was voted by the Killie fans as the club's all-time cult hero.

Montgomerie's final match for Killie was at home versus Rangers on 28 February 1999. After leaving Rugby Park, Montgomerie signed for Partick Thistle for the 1999-2000 season but after his spell at Firhill, where he played in 32 league matches, he returned to Killie in a match-day hospitality capacity before becoming a publican in Saltcoats and was also the chairman of Saltcoats Victoria.

In October 2016 he was inducted into the Kilmarnock 'Hall of Fame' alongside other well-known former players such as Tommy McLean, James Fowler and Stuart McLean.
