= Mark Skilling =

Scottish footballer

Personal information
- Date of birth: 6 October 1972 (age 54)
- Place of birth: Irvine, Scotland
- Position: Midfielder

Youth career
- Saltcoats Victoria

Senior career*
Years	Team	Apps	(Gls)
1992–1996	Kilmarnock	96	(11)
1998–1999	Stranraer	28	(1)
- Cumnock Juniors
Total		123	(12)

International career
1993	Scotland U21	2	(0)
- * Club domestic league appearances and goals

Mark Skilling (born 6 October 1972) is a Scottish former professional footballer who played as a midfielder.

== Career ==
Born in Irvine, Skilling played for Saltcoats Victoria, Kilmarnock, Stranraer and Cumnock Juniors.
