= John Bourke (Scottish footballer) =

Scottish footballer

Personal information
- Date of birth: 31 December 1953 (age 72)
- Place of birth: Glasgow, Scotland
- Position: Striker

Senior career*
Years	Team	Apps	(Gls)
1973–1978	Dumbarton	111	(52)
1977–1978	Dundee United	26	(5)
1978–1982	Kilmarnock	140	(42)
1982–1987	Dumbarton	106	(26)
1986–1987	Brechin City	28	(7)
1987–1988	Kilmarnock	11	(2)
Total		422	(134)
- * Club domestic league appearances and goals

John Bourke (born 31 December 1953) is a Scottish former footballer who played as a striker for a number of Scottish clubs, including Dumbarton (twice), Dundee United, Brechin City and Kilmarnock (twice). Bourke made more than 400 league appearances during his playing career.

John played for Dumbarton in both Scottish Cup semi-final games against Heart of Midlothian in 1976. The first game ended in a 0-0 draw. The replay, played four days later, resulted in a Hearts 3-0 victory. Hearts lost 3-1 to Rangers in the Final.

In another Scottish Cup semi-final, John was on the losing side with Dundee United, when they lost 2-0 to Rangers in season 1977-78. Rangers beat Aberdeen 2-1 in the Final.

John played in the Kilmarnock team that beat Rangers in the popular pre-season Tennent Caledonian Cup at Ibrox. Rangers were leading 2-0 before Killie scored two late goals to take the final to penalties. Kilmarnock won 6-5 on penalties.

John played for Kilmarnock in the Anglo-Scottish Cup semi-final first leg against Notts County in 1980-81 season. Killie lost the first leg 2-1 at Rugby Park. Notts County won the second leg 5-2 and lost in the final to Chesterfield.

In 1983-84 in his second spell with Dumbarton John helped "The Sons" gain promotion to the Scottish Premier Division He was joint second top league scorer with Kenny Ashwood, both one behind Joe Coyle John played in 34 leage games and scored 13 league goals that season.

After his football career, Bourke became a secondary school teacher, teaching physical education.
