= Ally Mitchell =

Scottish footballer and manager (born 1968)

Personal information
- Full name: Alistair Robert Mitchell
- Date of birth: 3 February 1968 (age 58)
- Place of birth: Kirkcaldy, Scotland
- Height: 5 ft 7 in (1.70 m)
- Position: Attacking midfielder

Youth career
- –1988: Ballingry Rovers

Senior career*
Years	Team	Apps	(Gls)
1988–1991	East Fife	87	(23)
1991–2003	Kilmarnock	363	(45)
2003	St Mirren	12	(0)
2003–2006	Brechin City	74	(2)
2006–2007	East Fife	3	(0)
2007–2008	Lochore Welfare		

Managerial career
- 2007–2008: Lochore Welfare
- * Club domestic league appearances and goals

Alistair Robert "Ally" Mitchell (born 3 February 1968) is a Scottish retired professional footballer. He was a versatile utility player especially in the attacking midfield position. He is nicknamed "Bully" and is 5'7" tall.

== Career ==
=== Playing career ===
Mitchell signed for East Fife from Ballingry Rovers in 1988, and in three seasons made 87 league appearances, scoring 23 goals. Mitchell moved from East Fife to Kilmarnock in July 1991 for a fee of £100,000. In 12 years at Kilmarnock, Mitchell made 363 league appearances, scoring 45 goals. He is perhaps best remembered for scoring a match-winning goal for Kilmarnock against Rangers at Ibrox Stadium that effectively handed the 1997–98 league championship to Celtic, and thereby stopped Rangers' attempt to win ten league titles in succession.

After leaving Kilmarnock in January 2003, Mitchell enjoyed a 12-game spell with St Mirren, before signing for Brechin City in June 2003. In three seasons with Brechin, Mitchell made 74 league appearances, scoring 2 goals. In July 2006 Mitchell re-signed for East Fife, and made 3 league appearances in his one season there.

=== Management career ===
Mitchell later became player-manager for Lochore Welfare.

== Honours ==
- Kilmarnock Hall of Fame
