= Tom Black (footballer) =

Scottish footballer

Personal information
- Date of birth: 11 October 1962 (age 64)
- Place of birth: Lanark, Scotland
- Position: Left back

Youth career
- Bellshill YM

Senior career*
Years	Team	Apps	(Gls)
1982–1989	Airdrieonians	176	(11)
1989–1992	St Mirren	74	(4)
1992–1996	Kilmarnock	139	(17)
1996–2000	Stranraer	105	(8)
–	Stonehouse Violet		
Total		494	(40)
- * Club domestic league appearances and goals

Thomas Black (born 11 October 1962) is a Scottish former footballer who played for Airdrieonians, St Mirren, Kilmarnock and Stranraer. Black played as a left back and scored goals as a free-kick and penalty taker, particularly at Kilmarnock.
