= Gus MacPherson =

Scottish footballer and manager

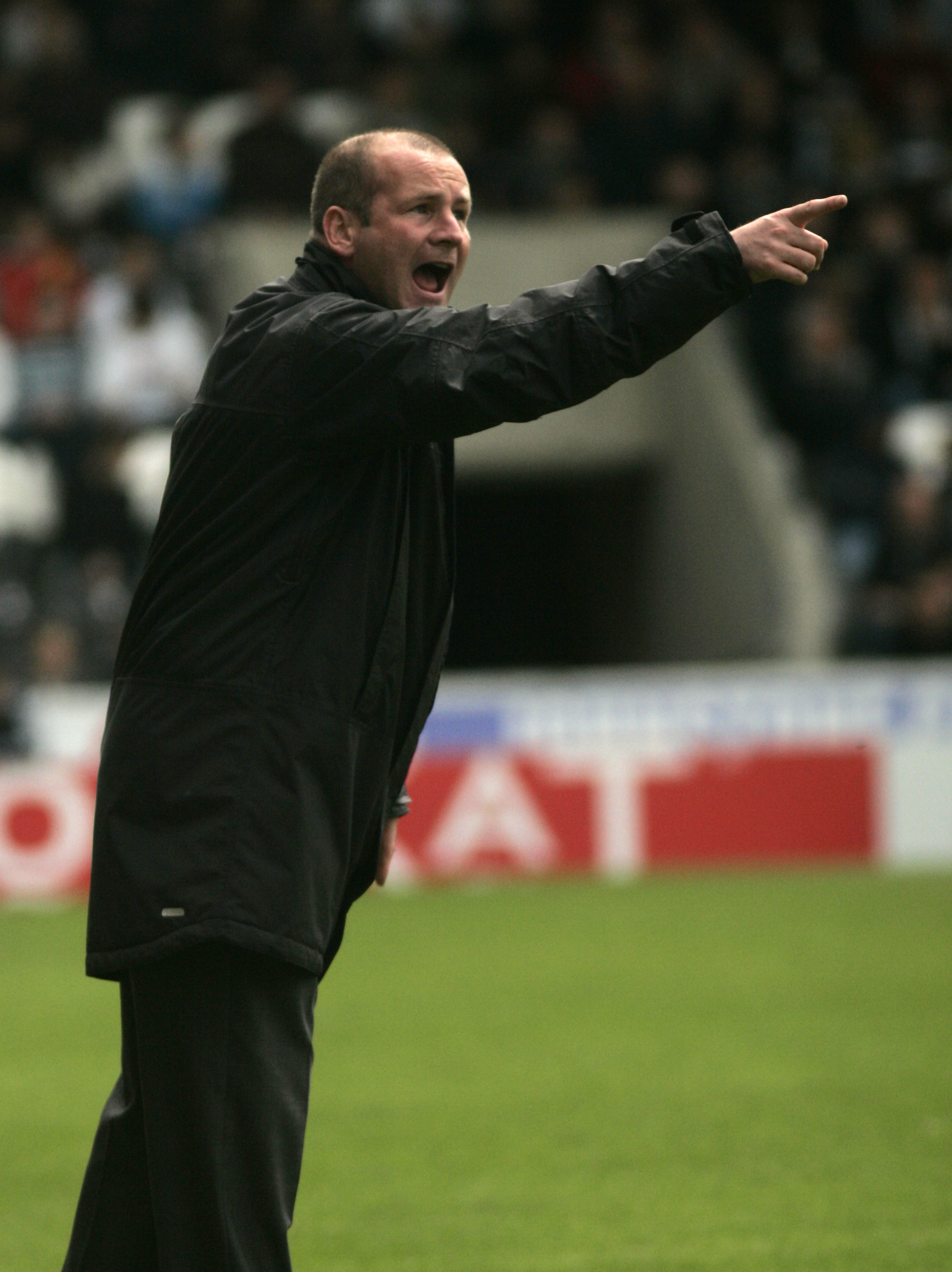
- MacPherson as St Mirren manager

Personal information
- Full name: Angus Ian MacPherson
- Date of birth: 11 October 1968 (age 58)
- Place of birth: Glasgow, Scotland
- Position: Defender

Youth career
- 1984–1989: Rangers

Senior career*
Years	Team	Apps	(Gls)
1989–1990	Rangers	0	(0)
1989–1990	→ Exeter City (loan)	11	(1)
1990–2001	Kilmarnock	354	(15)
2001–2003	Dunfermline Athletic	39	(0)
2003–2004	St Mirren	9	(0)
Total		413	(16)

Managerial career
- 2003–2010: St Mirren
- 2011–2012: Queen of the South
- 2014–2018: Queen's Park
- 2021: Greenock Morton
- * Club domestic league appearances and goals

Angus Ian MacPherson (born 11 October 1968) is a Scottish football coach and former player.

MacPherson's playing career saw spells at Rangers, Exeter City, Kilmarnock, Dunfermline Athletic and St Mirren.

His management career began at his final playing club St Mirren (initially as a player-manager), whom he guided to promotion in 2006. MacPherson has since managed Queen of the South and Queen's Park who he guided to promotion in 2016. He returned to St Mirren in September 2018 in an advisory role, a position he held until August 2020. MacPherson then had a stint as manager of Greenock Morton.

He is currently head of football operations at St Johnstone.

== Playing career ==
=== Rangers and loan to Exeter City ===
MacPherson started his career as a youth player with Rangers, but was unable to break into the first team, spending a period on loan to English side Exeter City.

=== Kilmarnock ===
In 1991, he moved to Kilmarnock, where he would enjoy the most successful period of his career becoming a regular fixture in the Rugby Park first team. He went on to play over 350 games at Kilmarnock and also was in the side that won the Scottish Cup with a 1–0 win over Falkirk at Ibrox Stadium.

=== Dunfermline Athletic ===
MacPherson left Kilmarnock in 2001 to join Dunfermline Athletic for two seasons before moving to St Mirren as player/assistant manager in 2003.

== Manager career ==
=== St Mirren ===
MacPherson was then appointed as player/manager on 18 December 2003 after the resignation of John Coughlin. He retired from playing to concentrate solely on management at the end of the 2003–04 season.

MacPherson guided St Mirren to second in 2004–05 finishing behind Falkirk. This was a significant improvement for the club having finished seventh the previous season. In the following season MacPherson guided St Mirren back to the Scottish Premier League having finished top of the First Division. He also guided the team to a 2–1 win in the Scottish League Challenge Cup final against Hamilton Academical with Simon Lappin and John Sutton netting the goals, becoming the only St Mirren manager to win a domestic double.

In the 2006–07 season he retained St Mirren's place in the SPL, following a brief relegation fight. In the second last game of the season St Mirren's place in the SPL was confirmed courtesy of a 3–2 win over Motherwell despite having been 2–0 down. This coupled with other results saw one of MacPherson's former clubs, Dunfermline relegated to the First Division.

In the following season and being continually challenged with budgetary constraints, MacPherson became the first St Mirren manager to be knocked out of both the Scottish League Cup and Scottish Cup by teams from a lower league in the same season. Despite these set-backs he retained St Mirren's SPL status with 10th place in the division. This was St Mirren's highest finish since the 1990–91 season, finishing one place above MacPherson's former club Kilmarnock and relegated Gretna.

In the 2008–09 season he led St Mirren to a win over Rangers at Love Street with Stephen McGinn netting the only goal of the game. Also in the same season he led St Mirren on a run of four unbeaten games, resulting in him receiving the SPL manager of the month award for December 2008. He also guided them to the semi-finals of the Scottish Cup, beating Celtic 1–0 in the quarter-finals. This result came just a week after a 7–0 defeat at Celtic Park. St Mirren were in a five club relegation battle, but a penultimate weekend win away to Falkirk, almost guaranteed safety. St Mirren stayed in the top flight on goal difference, two goals better off than Inverness.

In January 2010, after Jim Jefferies left Kilmarnock, MacPherson became the longest serving manager in the SPL. On 11 May 2010, St Mirren announced that they had parted company with MacPherson.

=== Queen of the South ===
In June 2011, MacPherson was announced as the new manager of Dumfries club, Queen of the South on a one-year contract. His assistant manager was announced as Andy Millen. MacPherson left the club after they were relegated to the Second Division in April 2012.

=== Queen's Park ===
MacPherson was appointed manager of Scottish League Two side Queen's Park in January 2014. He led the Spiders to promotion to Scottish League One through the play-offs in his second full season in charge beating Clyde over two legs in the playoff final. The club enjoyed two seasons in the third flight before relegation via play-offs in May 2018.

MacPherson left Queen's Park on 18 September 2018 to become the St Mirren technical director. He left St Mirren in August 2020.

=== Greenock Morton ===
In March 2021, MacPherson was appointed manager of Scottish Championship side Greenock Morton until the end of the 2020–21 season. He led the Ton to safety after winning the Scottish Championship play-offs beating Airdrieonians in the two-legged final in May 2021. McPherson parted company with Greenock Morton on 4 December 2021, with the team sitting in 8th place (ahead of the relegation places on goal difference).

== Managerial Record ==
As of match played 4 December 2021

Team	From	To	Record				
Team	From	To	G	W	D	L	Win %
St Mirren	18 December 2003	11 May 2010	289	101	83	105	34.95
Queen of the South	10 June 2011	30 April 2012	42	10	12	20	23.81
Queen's Park	22 January 2014	18 September 2018	211	72	57	82	34.12
Greenock Morton	10 March 2021	4 December 2021	37	9	16	12	24.32
Total			579	191	168	220	32.99

== Honours and achievements ==
=== Player ===
Kilmarnock

- Scottish First Division promotion: 1992–93
- Scottish Cup: 1996–97

=== Manager ===
St Mirren

- Scottish Challenge Cup: 2005-06
- Scottish First Division: 2005-06

Queen's Park

- Scottish League One play-offs: 2015-16

=== Individual ===
- Kilmarnock Hall of Fame
