= 1964–65 Kilmarnock F.C. season =

Kilmarnock
1964–65 season
- Manager: Willie Waddell
- Scottish Division One: Champions
- Scottish Cup: Quarter-finals
- Scottish League Cup: Group stage
- Inter-Cities Fairs Cup: R2
- Top goalscorer: League: Ronnie Hamilton, 15; All: Ronnie Hamilton & Jackie McInally, 21
- Highest home attendance: 32,021 (v Rangers, 14 November)
- Lowest home attendance: 5,193 (v Aberdeen, 27 March)
- Average home league attendance: 10,476 (up 1,585)
Home colours

The 1964–65 season was Kilmarnock's 63rd in Scottish league competitions, during which they became league champions for the first time in the club's history. The title was won on the final day of the season with a 2–0 win at Hearts. Kilmarnock won the championship on goal average, a tie-breaker that was replaced by goal difference in 1971–72. Had goal difference been adopted by 1964–65, Hearts would have won the championship.

== Scottish Division One ==
=== League table ===
Pos	Team	Pld	W	D	L	GF	GA	GAv	Pts	Qualification or relegation
1	Kilmarnock	34	22	6	6	62	33	1.879	50	Division Champions
2	Hearts	34	22	6	6	90	49	1.837	50	
3	Dunfermline Athletic	34	22	5	7	83	36	2.306	49	
4	Hibernian	34	21	4	9	75	47	1.596	46	
5	Rangers	34	18	8	8	78	35	2.229	44	

Source: RSSSF

=== Match results ===
Match Day	Date	Opponent	H/A	Score	Kilmarnock scorer(s)	Attendance
1	19 August	Third Lanark	H	3–1	Watson 68', O’Connor 75', Hamilton 85'	5,197
2	5 September	St Mirren	A	2–0	McIlroy 51', Hamilton 63'	4,636
3	12 September	Airdrieonians	H	2–0	Hamilton 25', McInally 78'	5,299
4	19 September	St Johnstone	A	1–0	McInally 55'	4,829
5	26 September	Dunfermline Athletic	H	1–0	Hamilton 53'	10,755
6	3 October	Hibernian	A	2–1	Hamilton 44', 71'	15,471
7	10 October	Partick Thistle	H	0–0		8,379
8	17 October	Dundee	A	3–1	Murray 62', Sneddon 64', McInally 68'	13,171
9	28 October	Celtic	H	5–2	McInally 7', 38', Hamilton 26', McFadzean 53', 55'	19,122
10	31 October	Dundee United	A	1–0	McInally 69'	8,567
11	7 November	Motherwell	H	1–1	Hamilton 40'	9,698
12	14 November	Rangers	H	1–1	Beattie 74'	32,021
13	21 November	Aberdeen	A	1–1	McInally 89'	9,101
14	28 November	Clyde	A	2–1	McFadzean 6', McInally 37'	4,863
15	5 December	Falkirk	H	2–0	McInally 35', Sneddon 41'	5,535
16	12 December	Morton	A	1–5	Hamilton 66' (pen.)	10,306
17	19 December	Heart of Midlothian	H	3–1	McIlroy 20', Sneddon 44', Hamilton 88'	18,285
18	26 December	Third Lanark	A	4–0	McInally 14', McLean 34', 87', McIlroy 84'	2,549
19	1 January	St Mirren	H	4–0	Sneddon 8', Hamilton 33', 61', Murray 81'	12,039
20	2 January	Airdrieonians	A	1–2	Hamilton 53'	7,808
21	9 January	St Johnstone	H	0–0		6,694
22	16 January	Dunfermline Athletic	A	0–1		9,766
23	30 January	Partick Thistle	A	0–1		6,560
24	13 February	Dundee	H	1–4	Hamilton 22'	7,158
25	16 February	Hibernian	H	4–3	Black 6', 53', Murray 55', King 60'	10,535
26	27 February	Celtic	A	0–2		21,875
27	10 March	Dundee United	H	4–2	Black 4', 87', McIlroy 54', McLean 64' (pen.)	5,756
28	13 March	Motherwell	A	2–0	McIlroy 62', Mason 85'	4,098
29	20 March	Rangers	A	1–1	Mason 49'	30,574
30	27 March	Aberdeen	H	2–1	Murray 10', McIlroy 40'	5,193
31	3 April	Clyde	H	2–1	McInally 10', Hamilton 40'	5,816
32	7 April	Falkirk	A	1–0	McIlroy 35'	2,569
33	17 April	Morton	H	3–0	Black 52', 80', McIlroy 81'	10,605
34	24 April	Heart of Midlothian	A	2–0	Sneddon 26', McIlroy 29'	36,348

=== Scottish League Cup ===
==== Group stage ====
Date	Opponent	H/A	Score	Kilmarnock scorer(s)	Attendance
8 August	Heart of Midlothian	H	1–1	McIlroy 53'	8,832
12 August	Partick Thistle	A	0–0		7,767
15 August	Celtic	A	1–4	Watson 62'	22,017
22 August	Heart of Midlothian	A	1–0	McInally 50'	10,391
26 August	Partick Thistle	H	4–0	Hamilton 42', 52', Murray 43', McInally 55'	6,344
29 August	Celtic	H	2–0	Hamilton 50' (pen.), McIlroy 89'	10,834

==== Group 3 final table ====
P	Team	Pld	W	D	L	GF	GA	GD	Pts
1	Celtic	6	4	1	1	18	5	13	9
2	Kilmarnock	6	3	2	1	9	5	4	8
3	Partick Thistle	6	1	2	3	6	14	–8	4
4	Heart of Midlothian	6	1	1	4	7	16	–19	3

=== Scottish Cup ===
Round	Date	Opponent	H/A	Score	Kilmarnock scorer(s)	Attendance
First round	6 February	Cowdenbeath	H	5–0	McInally 32', 57', 75', McLean 81' (pen.), 89'	6,276
Second round	20 February	East Fife	A	0–0		9,003
Second round replay	24 February	East Fife	H	3–0	McInally 2', 75', Hamilton 88'	10,201
Quarter-final	6 March	Celtic	A	2–3	McInally 59', 73'	47,000

=== Inter-Cities Fairs Cup ===
Killie pulled off a remarkable comeback in their first round Fairs Cup tie against German side Eintracht Frankfurt. They lost 3–0 in the first away leg and conceded again in the second minute of the return game at Rugby Park to fall four goals behind, but then scored five goals without reply to win the tie 5–4 on aggregate.

Round	Date	Opponent	H/A	Score	Kilmarnock scorer(s)	Attendance
First round first leg	2 September	(West Germany) Eintracht Frankfurt	A	0–3		35,000
First round second leg	22 September	(West Germany) Eintracht Frankfurt	H	5–1	Hamilton 12', 88', McIlroy 15', McFadzean 52', McInally 80'	14,930
Second round first leg	11 November	(England) Everton	H	0–2		23,561
Second round second leg	1 December	(England) Everton	A	1–4	McIlroy 6'	30,730

=== 1965 Summer Cup ===
Date	Opponent	H/A	Score	Kilmarnock scorer(s)	Attendance
1 May	Airdrieonians	H	3–0	Sneddon 16', McInally 35', Murray 89'	3,904
5 May	Third Lanark	A	3–0	Black 48' 58', McIlroy 85'	500
8 May	Motherwell	H	1–1	McInally 69'	5,061
12 May	Airdrieonians	A	4–2	McInally 52', McIlroy 69', Sneddon 70', Murray 89'	1,000
15 May	Third Lanark	H	6–2	McIlroy 15', 64', Murray 25', 73', Black 39', McInally 81'	3,718
19 May	Motherwell	A	0–3		5,000

==== Section 3 Final Table ====
P	Team	Pld	W	D	L	GF	GA	GD	Pts
1	Motherwell	6	5	1	0	15	3	12	11
2	Kilmarnock	6	4	1	1	17	9	8	9
3	Airdrieonians	6	1	0	5	8	16	–8	2
4	Third Lanark	6	1	0	5	10	22	–12	2

== See also ==
- Kilmarnock F.C. in European football
- List of Kilmarnock F.C. seasons
