= Heart of Midlothian F.C. 0–2 Kilmarnock F.C. (1965) =

Heart of Midlothian 0–2 Kilmarnock
- Event: 1964–65 Scottish Division One
Heart of Midlothian	Kilmarnock
0	2
- Date: 24 April 1965
- Venue: Tynecastle Park, Edinburgh
- Referee: R. Wilson
- Attendance: 36,346

Heart of Midlothian and Kilmarnock, the top two teams in Division One, contested their final match of the 1964–65 Scottish Football League season at Tynecastle Park on 24 April 1965. The two teams were separated by two points prior to the match which acted as a decider for the championship. In one of the closest contested league seasons, Kilmarnock won the game 2–0 and, as a result, they won the league title by 0.04 of a goal.

== Background ==
Both Kilmarnock and Heart of Midlothian had started the season strongly. Killie won their opening six matches and remained undefeated until a 5–1 loss against Morton on 12 December – 16 games into the season – while Hearts started with five wins from six and remained undefeated until they faced Kilmarnock at Rugby Park, one week after Killie's first loss of the season. The top two drew a crowd of 18,285 when they met on 19 December and goals from Brien McIlroy, Davie Sneddon and Ronnie Hamilton saw Kilmarnock record a 3–1 victory.

In the new year, Killie's title challenge faltered as they went on a run of one win in seven matches between January and February 1965. That left a resurgent Dunfermline Athletic top of the table, ahead of Hearts on goal average with Kilmarnock fourth, behind Hibernian on goal average and two points behind the league leaders having played one match more than them. Fifth-placed Rangers were installed as joint-favourites with Dunfermline by bookmakers as they had three games in hand and were only six points behind.

Kilmarnock and Heart of Midlothian then won six of their next seven games while their rivals faltered – Hibernian were beaten 4–0 by Celtic on 7 April to effectively end their chances before Dunfermline defeated Rangers 3–1 on 14 April to end the Glasgow side's hopes. However, their own title bid was finally derailed by a 1–1 draw with St Johnstone three days later. That left Hearts top with 50 points, two clear of Killie and with a goal average that was 0.097 better going into the final match of the season at Tynecastle Park.

Pos	Team	Pld	W	D	L	GF	GA	GAv	Pts
1	Heart of Midlothian	33	22	6	5	90	47	1.915	50
2	Kilmarnock	33	21	6	6	60	33	1.818	48
3	Dunfermline Athletic	33	21	5	7	78	35	2.229	47

As a result, Heart of Midlothian would be champions of Scotland for the fifth time if they were to beat or draw with Kilmarnock at home in the final league match. To become champions for the first time, Kilmarnock had to win by a margin of at least two goals.

== Match report ==
The home side started the match well and Roald Jensen created the first chance of the match but hit the post. A Hearts goal would have made Kilmarnock's task near impossible. However, Killie weathered the early storm and, after 26 minutes, Tommy McLean found space to cross for Davie Sneddon who headed the ball downward into the net for the first goal of the match. Despite being 1–0 down, Hearts were still in a position to win the league title.

That soon changed though as, just three minutes later, Bertie Black dribbled past a number of defenders before setting up Brien McIlroy to score Kilmarnock's second. The tables had turned and the Ayrshire side were now in a position to claim the title. Killie continued to press for the rest of the first half but couldn't add to their advantage.

Hearts began the second half as they had the first but Bobby Ferguson in the Kilmarnock goal was determined to keep them out. One last chance for the home side fell to Alan Gordon in injury time but Ferguson again stood strong and pulled of the save to keep the score at 2–0. Referee called time on the match and Kilmarnock were league champions.

== Match details ==
24 April 1965

Heart of Midlothian	0–2	Kilmarnock
		Sneddon 26'; McIlroy 29'

Tynecastle Park, Edinburgh
Attendance: 36,346
Referee: R. Wilson

Heart of Midlothian	Kilmarnock

HEART OF MIDLOTHIAN:
GK	1	Jim Cruickshank
DF	2	Danny Ferguson
DF	3	David Holt (c)
DF	4	Willie Polland
DF	5	Alan Anderson
MF	6	Billy Higgins
MF	7	Roald Jensen
MF	8	Roy Barry
FW	9	Willie Wallace
FW	10	Alan Gordon
FW	11	Johnny Hamilton
Manager:
Tommy Walker

KILMARNOCK:
GK	1	Bobby Ferguson
DF	2	Andy King
DF	3	Matt Watson
DF	4	Eric Murray
DF	5	Jackie McGrory
MF	6	Frank Beattie (c)
MF	7	Tommy McLean
IF	8	Jackie McInally
IF	10	Davie Sneddon
FW	9	Bertie Black
FW	11	Brien McIlroy
Manager:
Willie Waddell

== Aftermath ==
In the final league standings, Kilmarnock were ranked above Hearts on goal average by just 0.042 goals.

Pos	Team	Pld	W	D	L	GF	GA	GAv	Pts
1	Kilmarnock	34	22	6	6	62	33	1.879	50
2	Heart of Midlothian	34	22	6	6	90	49	1.837	50
3	Dunfermline Athletic	34	22	5	7	83	36	2.306	49

Defending champions Kilmarnock finished third in Division One the following season, 12 points adrift of winners Celtic – the first of nine consecutive titles for the Glasgow side.

The match was manager Willie Waddell's last in charge of Kilmarnock as he left at the end of the season to take up a job in journalism. Former Kilmarnock manager Malky MacDonald was brought in as his successor.

The following season, Kilmarnock competed in the European Cup for the first time. In the first round, they defeated 17 Nëntori of Albania 1–0 on aggregate which set up a tie with five-time European champions Real Madrid. Despite holding the Spanish champions to a 2–2 draw in the first leg at Rugby Park and briefly taking the lead in the second leg at the Bernabéu, they were ultimately eliminated 7–3 on aggregate. Real Madrid would go on to win the tournament.

Season 1964–65 remains the only time that both Rangers and Celtic finished outside the top four in the Scottish top flight.

Hearts would suffer a similar fate 21 years later. They were top of the league, two points clear ahead of nearest rivals Celtic, going into the final match of the season. However, they again lost 2–0, this time to Dundee, while Celtic defeated St Mirren 5–0 to win the title on goal difference.
