= 1962 Scottish League Cup final =

- Event: 1962–63 Scottish League Cup
| Kilmarnock | Heart of Midlothian |
| 0 | 1 |
- Date: 27 October 1962
- Venue: Hampden Park, Glasgow
- Attendance: 51,000

The 1962 Scottish League Cup final was played on 27 October 1962 at Hampden Park in Glasgow and it was the final of the 17th Scottish League Cup competition. The final was contested by Kilmarnock and Heart of Midlothian. Hearts won the match 1–0, with the only goal scored by Norrie Davidson.

== Match details ==
27 October 1962

| Kilmarnock | 0–1 | Heart of Midlothian |
|---|---|---|
| | | Davidson 25' |

Hampden Park, Glasgow
Attendance: 51,000

KILMARNOCK:
| GK | Sandy McLaughlan |
| FB | Jim Richmond |
| FB | Matt Watson |
| RH | Pat O'Connor |
| CH | Jackie McGrory |
| LH | Frank Beattie (c) |
| RW | Hugh Brown |
| IF | Bertie Black |
| CF | Andy Kerr |
| IF | Jackie McInally |
| LW | Brian McIlroy |
Manager:
Willie Waddell

HEART OF MIDLOTHIAN :
| GK | Gordon Marshall |
| FB | Willie Polland |
| FB | David Holt |
| RH | John Cumming (c) |
| CH | Roy Barry |
| LH | Billy Higgins |
| RW | Willie Wallace |
| IF | Danny Paton |
| CF | Norrie Davidson |
| IF | Willie Hamilton |
| LW | Johnny Hamilton |
Manager:
Tommy Walker
