= 1965–66 Kilmarnock F.C. season =

Kilmarnock
1965–66 season
- Manager: Malky MacDonald
- Scottish Division One: 3rd
- Scottish Cup: R3
- Scottish League Cup: SF
- European Cup: R2
- Top goalscorer: League: Brien McIlroy, 20; All: Brien McIlroy 28
- Highest home attendance: 25,372 (v Rangers, 19 March)
- Lowest home attendance: 3,773 (v Falkirk, 16 April)
- Average home league attendance: 8,706 (down 1,770)

The 1965–66 season was Kilmarnock’s 64th in Scottish League Competitions. They finished 3rd out of 18 clubs in Scottish Division One. They competed in the European Cup for the first time and were knocked out by the eventual winners Real Madrid.

== Scottish Division One ==
=== League table ===
Pos	Team	Pld	W	D	L	GF	GA	GD	Pts
1	Celtic	34	27	3	4	106	30	+76	57
2	Rangers	34	25	5	4	91	29	+62	55
3	Kilmarnock	34	20	5	9	73	46	+27	45
4	Dunfermline	34	19	6	9	94	55	+39	44
5	Dundee United	34	19	5	10	79	51	+28	43

Source: RSSSF

=== Match results ===
Match Day	Date	Opponent	H/A	Score	Kilmarnock scorer(s)	Attendance
1	25 August	Partick Thistle	H	2–1	McIlroy 71', 74'	7,806
2	11 September	Hibernian	A	3–3	McIlroy 32', 33', 71'	13,385
3	18 September	St Mirren	H	3–1	McFadzean 25', McLean 35' (pen.), Hamilton 65'	6,536
4	25 September	Dunfermline Athletic	A	0–1		7,104
5	2 October	Hamilton	H	3–1	McIlroy 27', McLean 45' (pen.), King 63'	5,155
6	9 October	Stirling Albion	A	3–2	McIlroy 17', Hamilton 52', 68'	3,985
7	16 October	Dundee	H	5–3	Hamilton 4', 79', McFadzean 6' 65', McLean 55' (pen.)	7,829
8	23 October	Morton	A	4–1	McIlroy 30', 48' 82', Hamilton 43'	8,458
9	30 October	Clyde	H	1–2	Hamilton 52'	6,362
10	6 November	Aberdeen	A	0–1		8,907
11	13 November	Motherwell	H	5–0	McInally 23', McIlroy 66', 69', Hamilton 75', Murray 86'	6,689
12	20 November	Rangers	A	0–5		33,225
13	3 December	Celtic	A	1–2	McIlroy 57'	21,131
14	11 December	Falkirk	A	2–3	McLean 44' (pen.), McFadzean 89	2,617
15	18 December	Dundee United	A	0–0		7,170
16	25 December	St Johnstone	H	3–1	McLean 25' (pen.), McIlroy 35', Hamilton 57'	4,493
17	1 January	St Mirren	A	7–4	McIlroy 9', 64', Mason 14', McLean 29', McInally 35', 43', Murray 87'	3,906
18	3 January	Hibernian	H	1–0	Mason 45'	11,298
19	8 January	Partick Thistle	A	0–1		6,310
20	15 January	Dunfermline Athletic	H	1–0	McInally 86'	8,526
21	22 January	Hamilton	A	4–1	Mason 5', Queen 44', 52', McInally 78'	2,573
22	29 January	Stirling Albion	H	2–1	McGuinness 35' (o.g.), Queen 67'	5,651
23	12 February	Dundee	A	2–0	Black 29', 40	8,782
24	26 February	Clyde	A	4–1	Queen 20', Murray 49', Black 85', McLean 87' (pen.)	5,137
25	28 February	Morton	H	4–0	McInally 13', 63', Queen 41', Murray 70'	7,148
26	9 March	Aberdeen	H	1–3	McLean 60' (pen.)	5,592
27	12 March	Motherwell	H	3–0	McInally 1', 62', McIlroy 14'	4,383
28	19 March	Rangers	H	1–1	McLean 89'	25,372
29	25 March	Celtic	H	0–2		25,035
30	4 April	Heart of Midlothian	H	2–2	McInally 55', Bertelsen 80'	5,026
31	9 April	Heart of Midlothian	A	3–2	Bertelsen 39', McIlroy 51', 84'	6,209
32	16 April	Falkirk	H	1–0	McIlroy 39'	3,773
33	23 April	Dundee United	H	1–0	Queen 65'	5,711
34	30 April	St Johnstone	A	1–1	Bertelsen 75'	2,441

=== Scottish League Cup ===
==== Group stage ====
Round	Date	Opponent	H/A	Score	Kilmarnock scorer(s)	Attendance
G3	14 August	St Johnstone	A	1–0	McIlroy 10'	5,810
G3	18 August	Partick Thistle	H	2–0	Black 29', McIlroy 88'	9,758
G3	21 August	Dunfermline Athletic	A	3–1	McLean 68', Sneddon 76', McIlroy 90'	9,073
G3	28 August	St Johnstone	H	3–0	Black 78', 88', Sneddon 83'	7,309
G3	1 September	Partick Thistle	A	2–1	McIlroy 38', McInally 82'	3,926
G3	4 September	Dunfermline Athletic	H	0–1		6,858

==== Group 3 final table ====
P	Team	Pld	W	D	L	GF	GA	GD	Pts
1	Kilmarnock	6	5	0	1	11	3	8	10
2	Dunfermline Athletic	6	3	1	2	14	9	5	7
3	St Johnstone	6	3	0	3	7	10	−3	6
4	Partick Thistle	6	0	1	5	3	13	−10	1

==== Knockout stage ====
Round	Date	Opponent	H/A	Score	Kilmarnock scorer(s)	Attendance
QF L1	15 September	Ayr United	H	2–0	McIlroy 64', Black 77'	10,728
QF L2	22 September	Ayr United	A	2–2	Murray 7', McIlroy 79'	8,495
SF	6 October	Rangers	N	4–6	McInally 36', McLean 70', 77' (pen.), 85'	54,702

=== Scottish Cup ===
Round	Date	Opponent	H/A	Score	Kilmarnock scorer(s)	Attendance
R1	5 February	Morton	A	1–1	Queen 65'	9,735
R1 R	9 February	Morton	H	3–0	Beattie 8', Black 29', Queen 46'	11,109
2	21 February	Motherwell	H	5–0	Queen 4', McIlroy 11', McInally 67', W. McCallum 82' (o.g.), Black 84	13,209
QF	5 March	Dunfermline Athletic	A	1–2	McInally 39'	19,363

=== European Cup ===
Round	Date	Opponent	H/A	Score	Kilmarnock scorer(s)	Attendance
R1 L1	8 September	(Albania) 17 Nentori	A	0–0		26,495
R1 L2	29 September	(Albania) 17 Nentori	H	1–0	Black 77'	15,717
R2 L1	17 November	(Spain) Real Madrid	H	2–2	McLean 20' (pen.), McInally 60'	24,325
R2 L2	1 December	(Spain) Real Madrid	A	1–5	McIlroy 22'	26,879

== See also ==
- Kilmarnock F.C. in European football
- List of Kilmarnock F.C. seasons
