= 1960 Scottish League Cup final =

- Event: 1960–61 Scottish League Cup
Rangers	Kilmarnock
2	0
- Date: 29 October 1960
- Venue: Hampden Park, Glasgow
- Attendance: 82,063

The 1960 Scottish League Cup final was played on 29 October 1960 at Hampden Park in Glasgow, and was the final of the 15th Scottish League Cup competition. The final was contested by Rangers and Kilmarnock. Rangers won the match 2–0, thanks to goals by Ralph Brand and Alex Scott.

== Match details ==
29 October 1960

Rangers	2–0	Kilmarnock
Brand; Scott

Hampden Park, Glasgow
Attendance: 82,063

RANGERS:
GK	George Niven
FB	Bobby Shearer
FB	Eric Caldow (c)
RH	Harold Davis
CH	Bill Paterson
LH	Jim Baxter
RW	Alex Scott
IF	Ian McMillan
CF	Jimmy Millar
IF	Ralph Brand
LW	Davie Wilson
Manager:
Scot Symon

KILMARNOCK :
GK	Jimmy Brown
FB	Jim Richmond
FB	Matt Watson
RH	Frank Beattie (c)
CH	Willie Toner
LH	Bobby Kennedy
RW	Hugh Brown
IF	Jackie McInally
CF	Andy Kerr
IF	Bertie Black
LW	Billy Muir
Manager:
Willie Waddell
