= Kilmarnock F.C. in international football =

Scottish club in European football

Kilmarnock in international football
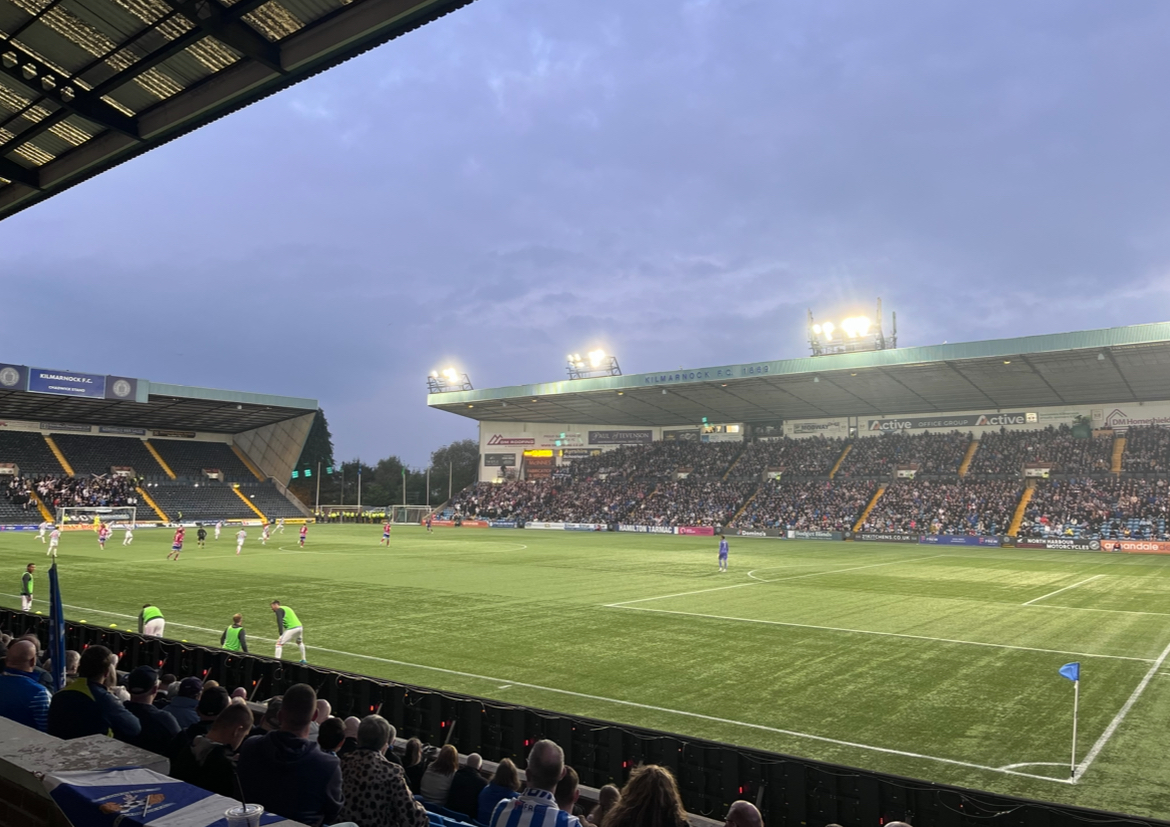
- Kilmarnock F.C. compete in the 2024-25 UEFA Conference League against F.C. Copenhagen
- Club: Kilmarnock
- First entry: 1960 International Soccer League
- Latest entry: 2024–25 UEFA Conference League

Titles
- Champions League: 0 (Best: First round)
- Europa League: 0 (Best: First round)
- Cup Winners' Cup: 0 (Best: First round)

Kilmarnock Football Club is a Scottish association football club based in the town of Kilmarnock. The club first competed in a European competition in 1964–65, entering the Inter-Cities Fairs Cup. In UEFA organised competitions, the club has never progressed beyond the first round. However, in the Inter-Cities Fairs Cup, Kilmarnock reached the semi-finals in 1966–67 losing out to Leeds United of England for a place in the final.

== Record ==
Kilmarnock's score is shown first in each case

=== International Soccer League ===
Kilmarnock's record in the International Soccer League
Season	Round	Venue	Country	Club	Score	Kilmarnock scorers	Att.
1960	Group stage	Polo Grounds, New York	West Germany	Bayern Munich	3–1	Bryceland, Kerr, McInally	10,444
1960	Group stage	Roosevelt Stadium, Jersey City	Northern Ireland	Glenavon	2–0	Muir, Watson	6,000
1960	Group stage	Polo Grounds, New York	England	Burnley	2–0	Kerr, Wentzel	13,000
1960	Group stage	Polo Grounds, New York	France	Nice	1–1	McInally	12,861
1960	Group stage	Roosevelt Stadium, Jersey City	United States	New York Americans	3–1	McInally, Muir, own goal	11,704
1960	Final	Polo Grounds, New York	Brazil	Bangu	0–2		25,044
1961	Group stage	Molson Stadium, Montreal	England	Everton	1–2	Kerr	5,000
1961	Group stage	Polo Grounds, New York	West Germany	Karlsruhe	2–3	Kennedy, Muir	10,000
1961	Group stage	Molson Stadium, Montreal	United States	New York Americans	4–0	Black, Brown, Kerr, Watson	7,000
1961	Group stage	Molson Stadium, Montreal	Canada	Montreal Concordia	4–2	Kerr (2), Black, McInally	4,000
1961	Group stage	Molson Stadium, Montreal	Turkey	Beşiktaş	1–1	Muir	2,000
1961	Group stage	Polo Grounds, New York	Romania	Dinamo București	0–0		3,000
1961	Group stage	Polo Grounds, New York	Brazil	Bangu	0–5		4,000
1963	Group stage	Polo Grounds, New York	England	West Ham United	3–3	Black, Richmond, Yard	14,532
1963	Group stage	Chicopee	West Germany	Preußen Münster	5–2	Black (2), McFadzean, McInally, Murray	6,000
1963	Group stage	Polo Grounds, New York	Mexico	Oro	3–3	McFadzean (2), Black	7,138
1963	Group stage	Chicago	France	Valenciennes	1–2	Yard	7,000
1963	Group stage	Polo Grounds, New York	Italy	Mantova	2–2	Black, McFadzean	7,473
1963	Group stage	Polo Grounds, New York	Brazil	Recife	3–1	Black, Murray, O'Conner	5,826
1965	Group stage	Randall's Island Stadium, New York	Hungary	Ferencváros	1–2	Own goal	6,000
1965	Group stage	Randall's Island Stadium, New York	England	West Bromwich Albion	2–0	Black, Hamilton	5,000
1965	Group stage	Randall's Island Stadium, New York	Poland	Polonia Bytom	1–1	Sneddon	5,000
1965	Group stage	Randall's Island Stadium, New York	England	West Bromwich Albion	0–2		4,000
1965	Group stage	Randall's Island Stadium, New York	Poland	Polonia Bytom	0–2		4,000
1965	Group stage	Randall's Island Stadium, New York	Hungary	Ferencváros	1–4	McIlroy	5,000

=== NASL International Cup ===
At the end of the 1968–69 season, Kilmarnock flew to the United States to take part in the NASL International Cup. The squad represented North American Soccer League side the St. Louis Stars. During the competition, they faced Aston Villa, Dundee United, West Ham United and Wolverhampton Wanderers who respectively represented the Atlanta Chiefs, the Dallas Tornado, the Baltimore Bays and the Kansas City Spurs.

Kilmarnock's record in the North American Soccer League
Venue	Country	Club	Score	Kilmarnock scorers	Att.
Atlanta	England	Aston Villa (Atlanta Chiefs)	1–2	J. McLean	8,171
Seattle	England	West Ham United (Baltimore Bays)	2–1	Queen, Morrison	7,764
Kansas City	England	Wolverhampton Wanderers (Kansas City Spurs)	2–3	Morrison, T. McLean	3,000
Dallas	Scotland	Dundee United (Dallas Tornado)	3–3	Queen (2), T. McLean	1,200
St. Louis	England	Wolverhampton Wanderers (Kansas City Spurs)	0–3		5,000
St. Louis	Scotland	Dundee United (Dallas Tornado)	0–1		5,000
St. Louis	England	Aston Villa (Atlanta Chiefs)	2–1	J. McLean, Queen	5,000
Baltimore	England	West Ham United (Baltimore Bays)	1–4	Morrison	3,008

=== European competitions ===
Key:

- (H) – Home match
- (A) – Away match

Kilmarnock's record in European competitions
Season	Competition	Round	Country	Opponent	1st leg	2nd leg	Agg.
1964–65	Inter-Cities Fairs Cup	First round	West Germany	Eintracht Frankfurt	0–3 (A)	5–1 (H)	5–4
1964–65	Inter-Cities Fairs Cup	Second round	England	Everton	0–2 (H)	1–4 (A)	1–6
1965–66	European Champion Clubs' Cup	Preliminary round	Albania	17 Nëntori	0–0 (A)	1–0 (H)	1–0
1965–66	European Champion Clubs' Cup	First round	Spain	Real Madrid	2–2 (H)	1–5 (A)	3–7
1966–67	Inter-Cities Fairs Cup	Second round	Belgium	Antwerp	1–0 (A)	7–2 (H)	8–2
1966–67	Inter-Cities Fairs Cup	Third round	Belgium	La Gantoise	1–0 (H)	2–1 (A) (Note: Match decided after extra time.)	3–1
1966–67	Inter-Cities Fairs Cup	Quarter-final	East Germany	Lokomotive Leipzig	0–1 (A)	2–0 (H)	2–1
1966–67	Inter-Cities Fairs Cup	Semi-final	England	Leeds United	2–4 (A)	0–0 (H)	2–4
1969–70	Inter-Cities Fairs Cup	First round	Switzerland	Zürich	2–3 (A)	3–1 (H)	5–4
1969–70	Inter-Cities Fairs Cup	Second round	Bulgaria	Slavia Sofia	4–1 (H)	0–2 (A)	4–3
1969–70	Inter-Cities Fairs Cup	Third round	Romania	Dinamo Bacău	1–1 (H)	0–2 (A)	1–3
1970–71	Inter-Cities Fairs Cup	First round	Northern Ireland	Coleraine	1–1 (A)	2–3 (H)	3–4
1997–98	UEFA Cup Winners' Cup	Qualifying round	Republic of Ireland	Shelbourne	2–1 (H)	1–1 (A)	3–2
1997–98	UEFA Cup Winners' Cup	First round	France	Nice	1–3 (A)	1–1 (H)	2–4
1998–99	UEFA Cup	First qualifying round	Bosnia and Herzegovina	Željezničar	1–1 (A)	1–0 (H)	2–1
1998–99	UEFA Cup	Second qualifying round	Czech Republic	Sigma Olomouc	0–2 (A)	0–2 (H)	0–4
1999–2000	UEFA Cup	Qualifying round	Iceland	KR Reykjavík	0–1 (A)	2–0 (H)	2–1
1999–2000	UEFA Cup	First round	Germany	Kaiserslautern	0–3 (A)	0–2 (H)	0–5
2001–02	UEFA Cup	Qualifying round	Northern Ireland	Glenavon	1–0 (A)	1–0 (H)	2–0
2001–02	UEFA Cup	First round	Norway	Viking	1–1 (H)	0–2 (A)	1–3
2019–20	UEFA Europa League	First qualifying round	Wales	Connah's Quay Nomads	2–1 (A)	0–2 (H)	2–3
2024–25	UEFA Europa League	Second qualifying round	Belgium	Cercle Brugge	1–1 (H)	0–1 (A)	1–2
2024–25	UEFA Conference League	Third qualifying round	Norway	Tromsø	2–2 (H)	1–0 (A)	3–2
2024–25	UEFA Conference League	Play-off round	Denmark	Copenhagen	0–2 (A)	1–1 (H)	1–3

== Overall record ==
=== By competition ===
Team	Pld	W	D	L	GF	GA	GD	WPCT
European Champion Clubs' Cup	4	1	2	1	4	7	−3	25.00
UEFA Europa League (Note: Includes matches in the UEFA Cup which was rebranded as the UEFA Europa League.)	16	5	3	8	10	19	−9	31.25
UEFA Conference League	4	1	2	1	4	5	−1	25.00
UEFA Cup Winners' Cup	4	1	2	1	5	6	−1	25.00
Inter-Cities Fairs Cup	20	8	3	9	34	32	+2	40.00
International Soccer League	25	9	7	9	45	42	+3	36.00
Total	73	25	19	29	102	111	−9	34.25

=== By country ===
Team	Pld	W	D	L	GF	GA	GD	WPCT
Albania	2	1	1	0	1	0	+1	50.00
Belgium	6	4	1	1	12	5	+7	66.67
Bosnia and Herzegovina	2	1	1	0	2	1	+1	50.00
Brazil	3	1	0	2	3	8	−5	33.33
Bulgaria	2	1	0	1	4	3	+1	50.00
Canada	1	1	0	0	4	2	+2	100.00
Czech Republic	2	0	0	2	0	4	−4	0.00
Denmark	2	0	1	1	1	3	−2	0.00
East Germany	2	1	0	1	2	1	+1	50.00
England	9	2	2	5	11	17	−6	22.22
France	4	0	2	2	4	7	−3	0.00
Germany	2	0	0	2	0	5	−5	0.00
Hungary	2	0	0	2	2	6	−4	0.00
Iceland	2	1	0	1	2	1	+1	50.00
Republic of Ireland	2	1	1	0	3	2	+1	50.00
Italy	1	0	1	0	2	2	0	0.00
Mexico	1	0	1	0	3	3	0	0.00
Northern Ireland	5	3	1	1	7	4	+3	60.00
Norway	4	1	2	1	4	5	−1	25.00
Poland	2	0	1	1	1	3	−2	0.00
Romania	3	0	2	1	1	3	−2	0.00
Spain	2	0	1	1	3	7	−4	0.00
Switzerland	2	1	0	1	5	4	+1	50.00
Turkey	1	0	1	0	1	1	0	0.00
United States	2	2	0	0	7	1	+6	100.00
Wales	2	1	0	1	2	3	−1	50.00
West Germany	5	3	0	2	15	10	+5	60.00
Total	73	25	19	29	102	111	−9	34.25

=== NASL International Cup ===
Representing the St. Louis Stars

Team	Pld	W	D	L	GF	GA	GD	WPCT
NASL International Cup	8	2	1	5	11	18	−7	25.00
Total	8	2	1	5	11	18	−7	25.00
