= Kilmarnock F.C. 5–1 Eintracht Frankfurt =

Kilmarnock 5–1 Eintracht Frankfurt
- Event: 1964–65 Inter-Cities Fairs Cup first round second leg
Kilmarnock	Eintracht Frankfurt
(Scotland)	(Germany)
5	1
- Date: 22 September 1964
- Venue: Rugby Park, Kilmarnock
- Referee: John Adair (Northern Ireland)
- Attendance: 14,930

Kilmarnock vs Eintracht Frankfurt was a football match played on 22 September 1964. The match was played at Rugby Park in Kilmarnock, Ayrshire and was the second leg of the 1964–65 Inter-Cities Fairs Cup first round tie.

Having lost the first leg 3–0, Kilmarnock came back from 1–0 down on the night and won the match 5–1 to progress to the second round 5–4 on aggregate.

== Background ==
Eintracht had previous experience in European competitions. A Frankfurt XI, made up of players from the city, competed in the inaugural Inter-Cities Fairs Cup in 1955–58 before Eintracht qualified for the European Cup following their only German football championship win in 1959. The following season they would take part in the European Cup final at Hampden Park in Glasgow when they lost 7–3 to Real Madrid. On their road to the final, the Germans eliminated Scottish champions Rangers 12–4 on aggregate in the semi-finals.

Despite having finished runners-up in the Scottish First Division four times in the previous five seasons, Kilmarnock had never played a European tie before 1964 as they had instead been selected by the Scottish Football Association to represent Scotland in the annual New York International Tournament.

On 2 September 1964, the two sides met for the first leg of their Inter-Cities Fairs Cup tie at the Waldstadion in Frankfurt. The score was level at half time. However, early second half goals from Erwin Stein and Horst Trimhold were followed up by a third from Dieter Stinka to give the Germans the upper hand for the second leg three weeks later.

== Match report ==
Injuries to Willie Waddell's Kilmarnock forced the manager to bring in 17-year-old Tommy McLean, whose only previous appearance for the club was in the previous season's Summer Cup semi-final defeat, to support the front line.

In the second minute, Wilhelm Huberts' 20-yard effort was no match for Campbell Forsyth in the Kilmarnock goal as he put Eintracht 1–0 up on the night and 4–0 up on aggregate. However, the home side pulled level in the 13th minute when Davie Sneddon set up Ronnie Hamilton and, four minutes later, they went ahead on the night after McLean's through ball found Brien McIlroy. The home side pressed for a third as the half went on but it remained 2–1 Kilmarnock on the night and 4–2 Eintracht on aggregate until half time.

In the second half, Eintracht started strongly but were unable to find an equaliser before Jackie McGrory's free-kick was headed into the goal by Jim McFadzean in the 52nd minute which reduced the aggregate arrears to one. McIlroy then thought he had levelled the tie on aggregate but his goal was disallowed for offside.

With nine minutes left, McIlroy's cross was headed home by Jackie McInally to put Kilmarnock 4–1 up on the night and tie the aggregate score at 4–4. This prompted the first of three pitch invasions by Kilmarnock supporters.

A foul on McLean lead to a Kilmarnock free-kick on the edge of the Eintracht box after 88 minutes. Sneddon played it short to Hamilton and his effort was deflected into the Eintracht goal which put Kilmarnock ahead for the first time in the tie, 5–4 on aggregate. A second pitch invasion ensued.

After a break in play to clear supporters, the match resumed before referee John Adair called time and the Kilmarnock supporters once again made their way onto the pitch.

== Match details ==
22 September 1964

Kilmarnock	5–1	Eintracht Frankfurt
Hamilton 13', 88'; McIlroy 17'; McFadzean 51'; McInally 81'		Huberts 2'

Rugby Park, Kilmarnock
Attendance: 14,930
Referee: John Adair (Northern Ireland)

GK	1	Campbell Forsyth
DF	2	Andy King
DF	4	Eric Murray
DF	5	Jackie McGrory
MF	6	Frank Beattie
MF	7	Tommy McLean
IF	8	Jackie McInally
IF	10	Davie Sneddon
FW	9	Ronnie Hamilton
FW	11	Brien McIlroy
FW	3	Jim McFadzean
Manager:
Willie Waddell

GK	Egon Loy
DF	Peter Blusch
DF	Willi Herbert
DF	Richard Weber
MF	Dieter Lindner
MF	Dieter Stinka
MF	Horst Trimhold
FW	Wilhelm Huberts
FW	Helmut Kraus
FW	Lothar Schämer
FW	Erwin Stein
Manager:
Ivica Horvat

== Aftermath ==
The following day, the match was described as "a game that will be remembered as long as football is played in Ayrshire" by the press and, despite general elections in both the UK and the United States, the match was front-page news in Scotland. Kilmarnock manager Willie Waddell said he had "never been so proud of any team" after the game.

In the second round, Kilmarnock played English side Everton and lost 6–1 on aggregate.

Later that season, they would go on to win the Scottish League title for the first time. As a result, they faced Real Madrid in the 1965–66 European Cup but were eliminated 7–3 on aggregate.

== See also ==
- 1964–65 Kilmarnock F.C. season
- Eintracht Frankfurt in European football
- Kilmarnock F.C. in European football
- Scottish football clubs in international competitions
