= 1959–60 Scottish Cup =

Tournament details
- Country: Scotland

Final positions
- Champions: Rangers
- Runners-up: Kilmarnock

The 1959–60 Scottish Cup was the 75th staging of Scotland's most prestigious football knockout competition. The Cup was won by Rangers who defeated Kilmarnock in the final.

== First round ==
Home team	Score	Away team
Aberdeen	0 – 0	Brechin City
Albion Rovers	2 – 1	Tarff Rovers
Berwick Rangers	1 – 3	Rangers
Clyde	2 – 0	Third Lanark
Dunfermline Athletic	1 – 1	St Johnstone
East Fife	0 – 2	Partick Thistle
Keith	3 – 0	Hamilton Academical
Kilmarnock	5 – 0	Stranraer
Greenock Morton	0 – 1	East Stirlingshire
Queen of the South	2 – 1	Dumbarton
Queen's Park	2 – 0	Raith Rovers
St Mirren	15 – 0	Glasgow University
Stenhousemuir	2 – 0	Rothes

=== Replays ===
Home team	Score	Away team
Brechin City	3 – 6	Aberdeen
St Johnstone	1 – 4	Dunfermline Athletic

== Second round ==
Home team	Score	Away team
Hibernian	3 – 0	Dundee
Hearts	1 – 1	Kilmarnock
Peebles Rovers	1 – 6	Ayr United
Aberdeen	0 – 2	Clyde
Alloa Athletic	1 – 5	Airdrieonians
Cowdenbeath	1 – 0	Falkirk
Dundee United	2 – 2	Partick Thistle
Dunfermline Athletic	2 – 3	Stenhousemuir
East Stirlingshire	2 – 2	Inverness Caledonian
Elgin City	5 – 1	Forfar Athletic
Eyemouth United	1 – 0	Albion Rovers
Montrose	2 – 2	Queen's Park
Motherwell	6 – 0	Keith
Rangers	2 – 0	Arbroath
St Mirren	1 – 1	Celtic
Stirling Albion	3 – 3	Queen of the South

=== Replays ===
Home team	Score	Away team
Queen's Park	1 – 1	Montrose
Inverness Caledonian	1 – 4	East Stirlingshire
Celtic	4 – 4	St Mirren
Kilmarnock	2 – 1	Hearts
Partick Thistle	4 – 1	Dundee United
Queen of the South	5 – 1	Stirling Albion

==== Second Replays ====
Home team	Score	Away team
Queen's Park	2 – 1	Montrose
Celtic	5 – 2	St Mirren

== Third round ==
Home team	Score	Away team
Clyde	6 – 0	Queen's Park
East Stirlingshire	0 – 3	Hibernian
Elgin City	1 – 2	Celtic
Ayr United	4 – 2	Airdrieonians
Eyemouth United	3 – 0	Cowdenbeath
Kilmarnock	2 – 0	Motherwell
Partick Thistle	3 – 2	Queen of the South
Stenhousemuir	0 – 3	Rangers

== Quarter-finals ==
Home team	Score	Away team
Ayr United	0 – 2	Clyde
Celtic	2 – 0	Partick Thistle
Eyemouth United	1 – 2	Kilmarnock
Rangers	3 – 2	Hibernian

== Semi-finals ==
2 April 1960

Kilmarnock	2 – 0	Clyde

Ibrox Stadium, Glasgow
Attendance: 45,000

2 April 1960

Rangers	1 – 1	Celtic

Hampden Park, Glasgow
Attendance: 79,786

=== Replays ===
6 April 1960

Rangers	4 – 1	Celtic
Davie Wilson (2); Jimmy Millar (2)		Neil Mochan

Hampden Park, Glasgow
Attendance: 70,977

== Final ==
23 April 1960

Rangers	2 – 0	Kilmarnock
Jimmy Millar (2)

Hampden Park, Glasgow
Attendance: 108,017
Referee: Bobby Davidson

=== Teams ===
RANGERS:
GK	(Scotland) George Niven
RB	(Scotland) Eric Caldow (c)
LB	(Scotland) John Little
RH	(Scotland) Ian McColl
CH	(Scotland) Bill Paterson
LH	(Scotland) Willie Stevenson
RW	(Scotland) Alex Scott
IR	(Scotland) Ian McMillan
CF	(Scotland) Jimmy Millar
IL	(Scotland) Sammy Baird
LW	(Scotland) Davie Wilson
Manager:
(Scotland) Scot Symon

KILMARNOCK:
GK	(Scotland) Jimmy Brown
RB	(Scotland) Jim Richmond
LB	(Scotland) Matt Watson
RH	(Scotland) Frank Beattie (c)
CH	(Scotland) Willie Toner
LH	(Scotland) Bobby Kennedy
RW	(Scotland) Jim Stewart
IR	(Scotland) Jackie McInally
CF	(Scotland) Andy Kerr
IL	(Scotland) Bertie Black
LW	(Scotland) Billy Muir
Manager:
(Scotland) Willie Waddell

== See also ==
- 1959–60 in Scottish football
- 1959–60 Scottish League Cup
