= 1966–67 Kilmarnock F.C. season =

Kilmanock
1966–67 season
- Manager: Malky MacDonald
- Scottish Division One: 7th
- Scottish Cup: R1
- Scottish League Cup: GS
- Inter-Cities Fairs Cup: SF
- Top goalscorer: League: Brien McIlroy, 16; All: Brien McIlroy, 21
- Highest home attendance: 31,551 (v Rangers, 11 February)
- Lowest home attendance: 3,689 (v Stirling Albion, 1 October)
- Average home league attendance: 8,439 (down 267)

The 1966–67 season was Kilmarnock's 65th in Scottish League competitions. They finished 7th out of 18 clubs in Scottish Division One. They reached the semi-finals of the Inter-Cities Fairs Cup.

== Scottish Division One ==
=== League table ===
Pos	Team	Pld	W	D	L	GF	GA	GD	Pts
5	Hibernian	34	19	4	11	72	49	+23	42
6	Dundee	34	16	9	9	74	51	+23	41
7	Kilmarnock	34	16	8	10	59	46	+13	40
8	Dunfermline Athletic	34	14	10	10	72	52	+20	38
9	Dundee United	34	14	9	11	68	62	+6	37

Source: RSSSF

=== Match results ===
Match Day	Date	Opponent	H/A	Score	Kilmarnock scorer(s)	Attendance
1	10 September	St Mirren	A	2–3	Bertelsen 50', McFadzean 69'	3,769
2	17 September	Ayr United	H	1–0	C.Watson 40'	9,094
3	24 September	Clyde	A	3–1	McIlroy 13', McInally 28', C.Watson 84'	2,823
4	1 October	Stirling Albion	H	2–1	McInally 68', 74'	3,689
5	8 October	Dundee	A	1–1	C.Watson 1'	9,082
6	15 October	Hibernian	H	2–1	Bertelsen 4', C.Watson 84'	8,341
7	29 October	Airdrieonians	H	1–0	Bertelsen 66'	5,881
8	5 November	Partick Thistle	H	0–0		5,132
9	9 November	Rangers	A	0–3		27,136
10	12 November	Dundee United	A	1–1	O'Connor 44'	6,278
11	19 November	Falkirk	H	3–0	McInally 39', McLean 79' pen., Bertelsen 80'	4,601
12	26 November	St Johnstone	A	3–1	Murray 12', 16', McIlroy 8'	3,849
13	3 December	Celtic	H	0–0		27,136
14	10 December	Dunfermline Athletic	H	1–1	McIlroy 13'	6,921
14	17 December	Motherwell	A	0–2		2,601
15	24 December	Heart of Midlothian	H	1–2	McIlroy 17'	5,039
17	31 December	Aberdeen	A	0–4		12,673
18	2 January	St Mirren	H	3–0	Beattie 5', Queen 63', McInally 83'	6,626
19	3 January	Ayr United	A	3–2	C.Watson 11', 27', 70'	7,899
20	7 January	Clyde	H	1–3	McLean 14'	5,885
21	14 January	Stirling Albion	A	4–1	McIlroy 48', McInally 60', McLean 88' pen., Queen 89'	3,077
22	21 January	Dundee	H	4–4	McIlroy 29', 37', C.Watson 60', McInally 73'	4,685
23	4 February	Hibernian	A	1–3	Morrison 4'	10,862
24	11 February	Rangers	H	1–2	McIlroy 72'	31,551
25	25 February	Airdrieonians	A	4–1	McIlroy 73', Bertelsen 81', 86', 88'	2,595
26	4 March	Partick Thistle	A	2–1	Queen 45', McLean 85'	4,196
27	18 March	Falkirk	A	1–0	McLean 60',	3,241
28	20 March	Dundee United	H	4–0	McInally 15', McIlroy 60', 82', Bertelsen 65'	4,719
29	25 March	St Johnstone	H	5–3	McLean 10', McIlroy 25', 50', 56', Bertelsen 30'	3,948
30	8 April	Dunfermline Athletic	A	1–1	McIlroy 18'	4,812
31	12 April	Motherwell	H	3–0	McIlroy 29', Bertelsen 60', McLean 82'	4,994
32	22 April	Heart of Midlothian	A	0–1		5,809
33	1 May	Aberdeen	H	1–1	McLean 78' pen.	5,229
34	15 May	Celtic	A	0–2		19,077

=== Scottish League Cup ===
==== Group stage ====
Round	Date	Opponent	H/A	Score	Kilmarnock scorer(s)	Attendance
G2	13 August	Stirling Albion	H	2–0	Bertelsen 9', Queen 27'	5,292
G2	17 August	Hibernian	A	1–2	Queen 32'	11,159
G2	20 August	Rangers	A	0–0		51,765
G2	27 August	Stirling Albion	A	0–0		3,375
G2	31 August	Hibernian	H	3–0	McIlroy 21', 48', Queen 35'	12,285
G2	3 September	Rangers	H	0–1		29,743

==== Group 2 final table ====
P	Team	Pld	W	D	L	GF	GA	GD	Pts
1	Rangers	6	3	2	1	13	4	8	8
2	Hibernian	6	4	0	2	12	9	3	8
3	Kilmarnock	6	2	2	2	6	3	3	6
4	Stirling Albion	6	0	2	4	3	18	−15	2

=== Scottish Cup ===
Round	Date	Opponent	H/A	Score	Kilmarnock scorer(s)	Attendance
R1	28 January	Dunfermline Athletic	H	2–2	McInally 47', King 59'	12,847
R1 R	1 February	Dunfermline Athletic	A	0–1		19,000

=== Inter-Cities Fairs Cup ===
Round	Date	Opponent	H/A	Score	Kilmarnock scorer(s)	Attendance
R2 L1	25 October	(Belgium) Royal Antwerp	A	1–0	McInally 16'	10,000
R2 L2	2 November	(Belgium) Royal Antwerp	H	7–2	McInally 7', 49', McLean 33' pen., 48', Queen 17' pen., 51', C.Watson 69'	11,963
R3 L1	14 December	(Belgium) La Gantoise	H	1–0	Murray 39'	8,612
R3 L2	12 December	(Belgium) La Gantoise	A	2–1	McInally 112', McLean 114'	9,500
QF L1	19 April	(East Germany) Lokomotiv Leipzig	A	0–1		30,000
QF L2	26 April	(East Germany) Lokomotiv Leipzig	H	2–0	Murray 6', McIlroy 65'	15,595
SF L1	19 May	(England) Leeds United	A	2–4	McIlroy 22', 36'	43,189
SF L2	24 May	(England) Leeds United	H	0–0		24,831

== See also ==
- List of Kilmarnock F.C. seasons
- Kilmarnock F.C. in European football
