= 1964–65 Dundee United F.C. season =

Dundee United
1964–65 season
- Chairman: J. Johnston-Grant
- Manager: Jerry Kerr
- Stadium: Tannadice Park
- Scottish First Division: 9th W15 D6 L13 F59 A51 P36
- Scottish Cup: Round 2
- League Cup: Semi-final
- Summer Cup: Runners-up

The 1964–65 season was the 57th year of football played by Dundee United, and covers the period from 1 July 1964 to 30 June 1965. United finished in ninth place in the First Division.

== Match results ==
Dundee United played a total of 45 competitive matches during the 1964–65 season.

=== Legend ===
Win
Draw
Loss

All results are written with Dundee United's score first. Own goals in italics

=== First Division ===
Date	Opponent	Venue	Result	Attendance	Scorers
19 August 1964	Partick Thistle	H	1-2	7,971	
5 September 1964	St Johnstone	A	0-2	4,422	
12 September 1964	Dundee	H	1-4	16,838	
19 September 1964	Celtic	A	1-1	24,267	
26 September 1964	Hibernian	H	0-1	7,959	
3 October 1964	St Mirren	A	1-2	4,121	
10 October 1964	Third Lanark	H	4-1	5,141	
17 October 1964	Falkirk	A	0-0	3,430	
24 October 1964	Airdireonians	A	3-3	1,250	
31 October 1964	Kilmarnock	H	0-1	8,567	
7 November 1964	Clyde	A	0-2	1,987	
14 November 1964	Dunfermline Athletic	H	2-0	3,670	
21 November 1964	Greenock Morton	A	0-2	8,434	
28 November 1964	Aberdeen	H	0-3	5,150	
5 December 1964	Heart of Midlothian	A	1-3	10,063	
12 December 1964	Rangers	H	1-3	17,426	
19 December 1964	Motherwell	A	1-1	3,460	
1 January 1965	St Johnstone	H	4-1	13,120	
9 January 1965	Celtic	H	3-1	13,991	
16 January 1965	Hibernian	A	4-3	12,107	
23 January 1965	St Mirren	H	2-0	10,639	
13 February 1965	Falkirk	H	4-0	6,155	
17 February 1965	Third Lanark	A	2-1	988	
27 February 1965	Airdrieonians	H	3-2	5,054	
10 March 1965	Kilmarnock	A	2-4	5,756	
13 March 1965	Clyde	H	6-0	6,102	
20 March 1965	Dunfermline Athletic	A	1-0	7,189	
24 March 1965	Dundee	A	4-2	16,598	
27 March 1965	Greenock Morton	H	3-2	8,454	
3 April 1965	Aberdeen	A	0-1	8,488	
10 April 1965	Heart of Midlothian	H	1-1	12,414	
17 April 1965	Rangers	A	0-1	13,622	
19 April 1965	Partick Thistle	A	0-0	2,458	
24 April 1965	Motherwell	H	3-1	5,213	

=== Scottish Cup ===
Date	Rd	Opponent	Venue	Result	Attendance	Scorers
6 February 1965	R1	Forfar Athletic	A	3-0	6,600	
20 February 1965	R2	Rangers	H	0-2	23,000	

=== League Cup ===
Date	Rd	Opponent	Venue	Result	Attendance	Scorers
8 August 1964	G4	Dundee	A	3-2	16,773	
12 August 1964	G4	Falkirk	H	3-0	6,085	
15 August 1964	G4	Motherwell	A	1-0	4,407	
22 August 1964	G4	Dundee	H	2-1	14,519	
26 August 1964	G4	Falkirk	A	2-5	2,476	
29 August 1964	G4	Motherwell	H	2-1	6,577	
9 September 1964	QF L1	Hamilton Academical	H	8-0	5,098	
16 September 1964	QF L2	Hamilton Academical	A	2-1	620	
30 September 1964	SF	Rangers	N	1-2	39,584	

=== Summer Cup ===
Date	Rd	Opponent	Venue	Result	Attendance	Scorers
1 May 1965	G2	Dundee	A	4-1		
5 May 1965	G2	St Johnstone	H	4-1		
8 May 1965	G2	Aberdeen	A	2-1		
12 May 1965	G2	Dundee	H	3-2		
15 May 1965	G2	St Johnstone	A	5-1		
19 May 1965	G2	Aberdeen	H	3-0		
22 May 1965	SF L1	Partick Thistle	A	4-0		
26 May 1965	SF L2	Partick Thistle	H	3-0		
29 May 1965	F L1	Motherwell	A	1-3		
2 June 1965	F L2	Aberdeen	H	1-0		

== See also ==
- 1964–65 in Scottish football
