= 1965–66 Heart of Midlothian F.C. season =

Heart of Midlothian
1965–66 season
- Manager: Tommy Walker
- Stadium: Tynecastle Park
- Scottish First Division: 7th
- Scottish Cup: Round 3
- League Cup: Group Stage
- Inter-Cities Fairs Cup: Round 3

During the 1965–66 season Hearts competed in the Scottish First Division, the Scottish Cup, the Scottish League Cup, the Inter-Cities Fairs Cup and the East of Scotland Shield.

== Fixtures ==
=== Friendlies ===
27 September 1965 Friendly	Hearts	1–2	Coleraine	Tynecastle Park
	Goal

4 October 1965 Friendly	Selkirk	0–11	Hearts	Ettrick Park
	Goal

11 October 1965 Friendly	Hearts	2–1	Newcastle United	Tynecastle Park
	Goal

=== East of Scotland Shield ===
4 May 1966 Final 1st Leg	Hibernian	1–3	Hearts	Easter Road

7 May 1966 Final 2nd Leg	Hearts	4–2	Hibernian	Tynecastle Park

=== Inter-Cities Fairs Cup ===
18 October 1965 Inter-Cities Fairs Cup R2 1st Leg	Hearts	1–0	Vålerenga	Tynecastle Park
			Goal	Attendance: 9,000

27 October 1965 Inter-Cities Fairs Cup R2 2nd Leg	Vålerenga	1–3	Hearts	Ullevaal Stadion
			Goal	Attendance: 14,625

12 January 1966 Inter-Cities Fairs Cup R3 1st Leg	Hearts	3–3	Real Zaragoza	Tynecastle Park
			Goal	Attendance: 17,200

26 January 1966 Inter-Cities Fairs Cup R3 2nd Leg	Real Zaragoza	2–2	Hearts	La Romareda
			Goal	Attendance: 24,230

2 March 1966 Inter-Cities Fairs Cup R3 Replay	Real Zaragoza	1–0	Hearts	La Romareda
			Goal	Attendance: 25,000

=== League Cup ===
14 August 1965 League Cup Group	Hearts	4–2	Rangers	Tynecastle Park
				Attendance: 32,859

18 August 1965 League Cup Group	Aberdeen	1–1	Hearts	Pittodrie Stadium
				Attendance: 17,275

21 August 1965 League Cup Group	Hearts	1–2	Clyde	Tynecastle Park
				Attendance: 12,007

28 August 1965 League Cup Group	Rangers	1–0	Hearts	Ibrox Park
				Attendance: 44,472

1 September 1965 League Cup Group	Hearts	2–0	Aberdeen	Tynecastle Park
				Attendance: 9,981

4 September 1965 League Cup Group	Clyde	1–2	Hearts	Shawfield Stadium
				Attendance: 2,231

=== Scottish Cup ===
9 February 1966 Scottish Cup R1	Hearts	2–1	Clyde	Tynecastle Park
				Attendance: 11,875

21 February 1966 Scottish Cup R2	Hearts	2–1	Hibernian	Tynecastle Park
				Attendance: 31,244

5 March 1966 Scottish Cup R3	Celtic	3–3	Hearts	Celtic Park
				Attendance: 45,965

9 March 1966 Scottish Cup R3 Replay	Hearts	1–3	Celtic	Tynecastle Park
				Attendance: 72,100

=== Scottish First Division ===
25 August 1965 Scottish First Division	Hearts	2–0	Hamilton Academical	Tynecastle Park
				Attendance: 7,635

11 September 1965 Scottish First Division	Dunfermline Athletic	1–1	Hearts	East End Park
				Attendance: 11,144

18 September 1965 Scottish First Division	Hearts	0–4	Hibernian	Tynecastle Park
				Attendance: 22,369

25 September 1965 Scottish First Division	St Johnstone	3–2	Hearts	Muirton Park
				Attendance: 5,582

2 October 1965 Scottish First Division	Hearts	0–0	Dundee	Tynecastle Park
				Attendance: 11,605

9 October 1965 Scottish First Division	Celtic	5–2	Hearts	Celtic Park
				Attendance: 27,115

16 October 1965 Scottish First Division	Partick Thistle	3–3	Hearts	Firhill Park
				Attendance: 9,653

23 October 1965 Scottish First Division	Hearts	5–2	Motherwell	Tynecastle Park
				Attendance: 9,507

30 October 1965 Scottish First Division	Hearts	1–1	Hearts	Tynecastle Park
				Attendance: 10,541

6 November 1965 Scottish First Division	Dundee United	2–2	Hearts	Tannadice Park
				Attendance: 10,218

13 November 1965 Scottish First Division	Hearts	0–2	Rangers	Tynecastle Park
				Attendance: 28,697

20 November 1965 Scottish First Division	Hearts	2–1	Morton	Tynecastle Park
				Attendance: 9,006

27 November 1965 Scottish First Division	Falkirk	0–1	Hearts	Brockville Park
				Attendance: 4,132

11 December 1965 Scottish First Division	Hearts	4–1	Clyde	Tynecastle Park
				Attendance: 7,459

18 December 1965 Scottish First Division	Stirling Albion	2–2	Hearts	Annfield Stadium
				Attendance: 3,048

25 December 1965 Scottish First Division	Hearts	4–0	St Mirren	Tynecastle Park
				Attendance: 6,250

1 January 1966 Scottish First Division	Hibernian	2–3	Hearts	Easter Road
				Attendance: 32,192

3 January 1966 Scottish First Division	Hearts	0–0	Dunfermline Athletic	Tynecastle Park
				Attendance: 24,579

8 January 1966 Scottish First Division	Hamilton Academical	0–1	Hearts	Douglas Park
				Attendance: 2,914

15 January 1966 Scottish First Division	Hearts	0–0	St Johnstone	Tynecastle Park
				Attendance: 6,410

29 January 1966 Scottish First Division	Hearts	3–2	Celtic	Tynecastle Park
				Attendance: 28,717

12 February 1966 Scottish First Division	Hearts	3–1	Partick Thistle	Tynecastle Park
				Attendance: 7,659

26 February 1966 Scottish First Division	Aberdeen	0–1	Hearts	Pittodrie Stadium
				Attendance: 11,934

12 March 1966 Scottish First Division	Rangers	1–1	Hearts	Ibrox Park
				Attendance: 38,571

16 March 1966 Scottish First Division	Hearts	0–1	Dundee United	Tynecastle Park
				Attendance: 7,306

19 March 1966 Scottish First Division	Morton	0–3	Hearts	Cappielow Park
				Attendance: 5,975

23 March 1966 Scottish First Division	Motherwell	4–2	Hearts	Fir Park
				Attendance: 2,624

26 March 1966 Scottish First Division	Hearts	1–2	Falkirk	Tynecastle Park
				Attendance: 5,315

4 April 1966 Scottish First Division	Kilmarnock	2–2	Hearts	Rugby Park
				Attendance: 5,026

9 April 1966 Scottish First Division	Hearts	2–3	Kilmarnock	Tynecastle Park
				Attendance: 7,162

13 April 1966 Scottish First Division	Dundee	1–0	Hearts	Dens Park
				Attendance: 5,157

16 April 1966 Scottish First Division	Clyde	0–1	Hearts	Shawfield Stadium
				Attendance: 2,128

23 April 1966 Scottish First Division	Hearts	1–1	Stirling Albion	Tynecastle Park
				Attendance: 5,465

30 April 1966 Scottish First Division	St Mirren	1–1	Hearts	St Mirren Park, Love Street
				Attendance: 4,732

== See also ==
- List of Heart of Midlothian F.C. seasons
