= Ian McMillan (footballer) =

Scottish footballer (1931–2024)

Personal information
- Full name: John Livingstone McMillan
- Date of birth: 18 March 1931
- Place of birth: Airdrie, Scotland
- Date of death: 16 February 2024 (aged 92)
- Position: Inside forward

Senior career*
Years	Team	Apps	(Gls)
1948–1958	Airdrieonians	249	(102)
1958–1964	Rangers	127	(36)
1964–1966	Airdrieonians	52	(17)
Total		428	(155)

International career
1952–1961	Scotland	6	(2)
1952–1954	Scottish League XI	2	(0)
1953	Scotland B	1	(1)
1955	Scotland A vs B trial	1	(0)

Managerial career
- 1970–1976: Airdrieonians
- 1985–1986: Airdrieonians
- * Club domestic league appearances and goals

John Livingstone "Ian" McMillan (18 March 1931 – 16 February 2024) was a Scottish footballer who played as an inside forward for Airdrieonians, Rangers and the Scotland national team.

== Club career ==
McMillan was born in Airdrie. Nicknamed "The Wee Prime Minister" (he shared a variant of his surname with the incumbent of the era), he started his career with local club Airdrieonians in 1948 where he would go on to become a club legend. He scored 102 goals in 249 league appearances over ten years for the club in this spell, in the role of scheming inside-forward (a creative midfield position in today's football parlance).

McMillan was at Rangers from 1958 until 1964, making 127 league appearances and 200 in all competitions, including the 1961 European Cup Winners' Cup Final. The Gers lost out in that tie to Fiorentina, but his spell was otherwise very successful, featuring four Scottish League titles (1958–59, 1960–61, 1962–63 and 1963–64), three Scottish Cup winner's medals (1960, 1962 and 1963), and two from the Scottish League Cup (1960 and 1961). Despite his prominent role at a major club, he also continued to work in his other profession as a mining surveyor as he had done as a part-time player. He studied geology as a student at the University of Edinburgh.

McMillan returned to Airdrieonians in 1964 where he would remain for a further two years, though affected by injuries.

== International career ==
McMillan was capped six times by the Scotland national team between 1952 and 1961, scoring twice – both against the United States in April 1952. McMillan was in Scotland's 22-man 1954 World Cup squad, but the SFA decided to take only 13 of the group to the finals, with McMillan staying at home on reserve with the likes of Bobby Combe and Jimmy Binning (inside forward George Hamilton was also on reserve, but travelled after Bobby Johnstone withdrew through injury). He was also the last surviving player of the squad.

== Later life and death ==
McMillan later managed Airdrieonians between 1970 and 1976, taking them to 1975 Scottish Cup Final. He was latterly Honorary president of the current Airdrieonians, a club that was formed as 'Airdrie United' after the original Airdrieonians went out of business in 2002.

Ian McMillan died 16 February 2024, at the age of 92. He was the grandfather of Iain Russell.

== Career statistics ==
Appearances and goals by national team and year
National team	Year	Apps	Goals
Scotland	1952	3	2
Scotland	1955	1	0
Scotland	1956	1	0
Scotland	1961	1	0
Total		6	2

Scores and results list Scotland's goal tally first, score column indicates score after each McMillan goal.

List of international goals scored by Ian McMillan
No.	Date	Venue	Opponent	Score	Result	Competition	Ref.
1	30 April 1952	Hampden Park, Glasgow, Scotland	United States	3–0	6–0	Friendly	
2	30 April 1952	Hampden Park, Glasgow, Scotland	United States	6–0	6–0	Friendly	

== Honours ==
- Scottish Football Hall of Fame inductee: 2018
