= 1963–64 Heart of Midlothian F.C. season =

Heart of Midlothian
1963–64 season
- Manager: Tommy Walker
- Stadium: Tynecastle Park
- Scottish First Division: 2nd
- Scottish Cup: Round 3
- League Cup: Group Stage
- Inter-Cities Fairs Cup: Round 1
- Summer Cup: Group Stage

During the 1963–64 season Hearts competed in the Scottish First Division, the Scottish Cup, the Scottish League Cup, the Inter-Cities Fairs Cup, the Summer Cup and the East of Scotland Shield.

== Fixtures ==
=== Friendlies ===
3 August 1963 Friendly	Hearts	7–0	Dunfermline Athletic	Tynecastle Park
	Goal			Attendance: 12,000

24 April 1964 Stamford Bridge Trophy	Hearts	2–0	Chelsea	Tynecastle Park
	Goal			Attendance: 8,500

27 April 1964 Friendly	East Region Juniors	1–4	Hearts	Creamery Park
	Goal			Attendance: 2,000

31 May 1964 International Soccer League	Hearts	1–0	Blackburn Rovers	Downing Stadium
	Goal

5 June 1964 Tour	East Canada Pro All Stars	0–2	Hearts	Toronto
	Goal

7 June 1964 International Soccer League	Lanerossi Vicenza	1–1	Hearts	Downing Stadium
	Goal

14 June 1964 International Soccer League	Bahia	0–1	Hearts	Downing Stadium
	Goal

19 June 1964 International Soccer League	Hearts	3–0	Werder Bremen	Chicago, Illinois
	Goal

21 June 1964 International Soccer League	Hearts	2–1	Lanerossi Vicenza	Chicopee, Massachusetts
	Goal

24 June 1964 International Soccer League	Hearts	2–0	Blackburn Rovers	Downing Stadium
	Goal

=== East of Scotland Shield ===
16 March 1964 Final 1st Leg	Hibernian	2–0	Hearts	Easter Road

8 April 1964 Final 2nd Leg	Hearts	3–0	Hibernian	Tynecastle Park

=== Inter-Cities Fairs Cup ===
25 September 1963 Inter-Cities Fairs Cup R1 1st Leg	Lausanne-Sports	2–2	Hearts	Stade Olympique de la Pontaise
			Goal	Attendance: 6,000

9 October 1963 Inter-Cities Fairs Cup R1 2nd Leg	Hearts	4–4	Lausanne-Sports	Tynecastle Park
			Goal	Attendance: 11,715

15 October 1963 Inter-Cities Fairs Cup R1 Replay	Lausanne-Sports	3–2	Hearts	Stade Olympique de la Pontaise
			Goal	Attendance: 6,200

=== League Cup ===
10 August 1963 League Cup Group	Hearts	6–2	Falkirk	Tynecastle Park
				Attendance: 11,051

14 August 1963 League Cup Group	Motherwell	0–3	Hearts	Fir Park
				Attendance: 12,833

17 August 1963 League Cup Group	Partick Thistle	2–2	Hearts	Firhill Park
				Attendance: 12,301

24 August 1963 League Cup Group	Falkirk	0–3	Hearts	Brockville Park
				Attendance: 5,935

28 August 1963 League Cup Group	Hearts	0–0	Motherwell	Tynecastle Park
				Attendance: 18,747

31 August 1963 League Cup Group	Hearts	2–2	Partick Thistle	Tynecastle Park
				Attendance: 9,295

=== Scottish Cup ===
25 January 1964 Scottish Cup R2	Queen of the South	0–3	Hearts	Tynecastle Park
				Attendance: 8,433

15 February 1964 Scottish Cup R3	Motherwell	3–3	Hearts	Fir Park
				Attendance: 21,648

19 February 1964 Scottish Cup R3 Replay	Hearts	1–2	Motherwell	Tynecastle Park
				Attendance: 32,403

=== Summer Cup ===
2 May 1964 Summer Cup Group	Hearts	3–2	Hibernian	Tynecastle Park

6 May 1964 Summer Cup Group	Falkirk	1–4	Hearts	Brockville Park

9 May 1964 Summer Cup Group	Hearts	2–1	Dunfermline Athletic	Tynecastle Park

13 May 1964 Summer Cup Group	Hibernian	1–0	Hearts	Easter Road

16 May 1964 Summer Cup Group	Hearts	1–2	Falkirk	Tynecastle Park

20 May 1964 Summer Cup Group	Dunfermline Athletic	0–0	Hearts	East End Park

=== Scottish First Division ===
21 August 1963 Scottish First Division	Airdrieonians	0–2	Hearts	Broomfield Park
				Attendance: 4,089

7 September 1963 Scottish First Division	Hearts	4–2	Hibernian	Tynecastle Park
				Attendance: 29,713

14 September 1963 Scottish First Division	Dunfermline Athletic	2–2	Hearts	East End Park
				Attendance: 12,414

21 September 1963 Scottish First Division	Hearts	4–1	Partick Thistle	Tynecastle Park
				Attendance: 11,766

28 September 1963 Scottish First Division	Falkirk	1–2	Hearts	Brockville Park
				Attendance: 8,518

5 October 1963 Scottish First Division	Hearts	3–3	St Johnstone	Tynecastle Park
				Attendance: 11,609

12 October 1963 Scottish First Division	Hearts	0–1	Queen of the South	Tynecastle Park
				Attendance: 10,817

19 October 1963 Scottish First Division	Third Lanark	0–2	Hearts	Cathkin Park
				Attendance: 4,414

26 October 1963 Scottish First Division	Kilmarnock	3–1	Hearts	Rugby Park
				Attendance: 8,469

2 November 1963 Scottish First Division	Hearts	0–0	Aberdeen	Tynecastle Park
				Attendance: 11,347

9 November 1963 Scottish First Division	Hearts	5–1	St Mirren	Tynecastle Park
				Attendance: 9,599

16 November 1963 Scottish First Division	Dundee United	0–0	Hearts	Tannadice Park
				Attendance: 8,170

23 November 1963 Scottish First Division	Hearts	1–3	Dundee	Tynecastle Park
				Attendance: 11,582

30 November 1963 Scottish First Division	Rangers	0–3	Hearts	Ibrox Park
				Attendance: 24,020

7 December 1963 Scottish First Division	Hearts	1–1	Motherwell	Tynecastle Park
				Attendance: 12,746

14 December 1963 Scottish First Division	Hearts	1–1	Celtic	Tynecastle Park
				Attendance: 22,107

21 December 1963 Scottish First Division	East Stirlingshire	2–3	Hearts	Firs Park
				Attendance: 3,454

28 December 1963 Scottish First Division	Hearts	4–0	Airdrieonians	Broomfield Park
				Attendance: 12,069

1 January 1964 Scottish First Division	Hibernian	1–1	Hearts	Easter Road
				Attendance: 31,439

2 January 1964 Scottish First Division	Hearts	2–1	Dunfermline Athletic	Tynecastle Park
				Attendance: 19,107

4 January 1964 Scottish First Division	Partick Thistle	2–1	Hearts	Firhill Park
				Attendance: 13,047

11 January 1964 Scottish First Division	Hearts	4–0	East Stirlingshire	Tynecastle Park
				Attendance: 8,865

17 January 1964 Scottish First Division	Hearts	4–1	Falkirk	Tynecastle Park
				Attendance: 8,696

1 February 1964 Scottish First Division	St Johnstone	1–4	Hearts	Muirton Park
				Attendance: 8,661

8 February 1964 Scottish First Division	Queen of the South	1–4	Hearts	Palmerston Park
				Attendance: 4,213

22 February 1964 Scottish First Division	Hearts	1–1	Kilmarnock	Tynecastle Park
				Attendance: 13,639

29 February 1964 Scottish First Division	Aberdeen	1–2	Hearts	Pittodrie Park
				Attendance: 10,064

4 March 1964 Scottish First Division	Hearts	4–1	Third Lanark	Tynecastle Park
				Attendance: 5,757

7 March 1964 Scottish First Division	St Mirren	0–2	Hearts	St Mirren Park, Love Street
				Attendance: 5,845

14 March 1964 Scottish First Division	Hearts	0–4	Dundee United	Tynecastle Park
				Attendance: 7,060

21 March 1964 Scottish First Division	Dundee	2–4	Hearts	Dens Park
				Attendance: 11,593

1 April 1964 Scottish First Division	Hearts	1–2	Rangers	Tynecastle Park
				Attendance: 29,240

4 April 1964 Scottish First Division	Motherwell	0–1	Hearts	Fir Park
				Attendance: 5,602

18 April 1964 Scottish First Division	Celtic	1–1	Hearts	Celtic Park
				Attendance: 19,456

== See also ==
- List of Heart of Midlothian F.C. seasons
