= David Sneddon (disambiguation) =

David Sneddon (born 1978) is a British pop artist.

David Sneddon may also refer to:

- David Louis Sneddon (born 1980, disappeared 2004), American university student allegedly abducted by North Korea
- Davie Sneddon (born 1936), Scottish football player
- Davie Sneddon, fictional character on Scottish soap opera Take the High Road
