= Jimmy Collins (footballer, born 1937) =

Scottish footballer

Personal information
- Full name: James Collins
- Date of birth: 21 December 1937
- Place of birth: Sorn, Ayrshire, Scotland
- Date of death: 25 July 2018 (aged 80)
- Place of death: Shoreham-by-Sea, England
- Position: Inside forward

Senior career*
Years	Team	Apps	(Gls)
–1956	Lugar Boswell Thistle		
1956–1962	Tottenham Hotspur	2	(0)
1962–1967	Brighton & Hove Albion	201	(44)
1967–1971	Wimbledon		
- Stevenage
- Southwick
- Shoreham
- Saltdean United
- * Club domestic league appearances and goals

James Collins (21 December 1937 – 25 July 2018) was a Scottish professional footballer who played for Lugar Boswell Thistle, Tottenham Hotspur, Brighton & Hove Albion, and a number of English non-League clubs.

== Life and career ==
Collins was born in Sorn, Ayrshire. He began his football career with Lugar Boswell Thistle, and was capped twice at Junior level in 1956, before joining Tottenham Hotspur in June of that year. The inside forward featured in two first team matches in 1961 for the Lilywhites and made his senior debut against West Ham United on 23 August 1961. In October 1962, Collins signed for Brighton & Hove Albion, where he was appointed captain and went on to score 48 goals from 221 appearances in all competitions. He left the club at the end of the 1966–67 season for Wimbledon of the Southern League, where he spent four years, and then played for Stevenage, Southwick, Shoreham and Saltdean United. Collins died in Shoreham-by-Sea in 2018 at the age of 80.
