= Danny Paton =

Scottish footballer

Personal information
- Full name: Robert Simpson Reid Paton
- Date of birth: 27 January 1936
- Place of birth: West Calder, Scotland
- Date of death: 10 March 2011 (aged 75)
- Place of death: Livingston, Scotland
- Position: Inside forward

Youth career
- Newtongrange Star

Senior career*
Years	Team	Apps	(Gls)
1957–1964	Heart of Midlothian	51	(18)
1964–1965	Oxford United	2	(1)
1965–1969	Bedford Town	223	(58)
Total		276	(77)
- * Club domestic league appearances and goals

Robert Simpson Reid "Danny" Paton (27 January 1936 – 10 March 2011) was a Scottish footballer, who played for Heart of Midlothian ("Hearts"), Oxford United and Bedford Town.

Paton was born in the coal-mining village of Breich. He was a skilful, ball-playing inside-forward and featured in the Hearts side that won the 1962 Scottish League Cup Final.
