= David Holt (footballer, born 1936) =

Scottish footballer (born 1936)

Davie Holt
Personal information
- Full name: David Duff Holt
- Date of birth: 3 January 1936 (age 90)
- Place of birth: Glasgow, Scotland
- Height: 5 ft 08 in (1.73 m)
- Position: Left back

Youth career
- Glentyan Thistle
- Newhill Amateurs
- Lugar Boswell Thistle

Senior career*
Years	Team	Apps	(Gls)
1957–1960	Queen's Park	61	(2)
1960–1969	Heart of Midlothian	231	(0)
1969–1970	Partick Thistle	19	(0)
Total		311	(2)

International career
1958	Scotland U23	1	(0)
1960	Great Britain	3	(0)
1963–1964	Scotland	5	(0)
1964	SFA trial v SFL	1	(0)
1964	Scottish League XI	1	(0)
- * Club domestic league appearances and goals

David Duff Holt (born 3 January 1936) is a Scottish former international footballer who played as a left back. During his playing career, Holt made more than 300 appearances in the Scottish Football League for Queen's Park, Heart of Midlothian and Partick Thistle between 1957 and 1970.

At Hearts (who were reigning Scottish champions at the time he joined the club), Holt won the 1962–63 Scottish League Cup during his nine-year spell at Tynecastle Park and was an important member of the team which only missed out on the 1964–65 Scottish Division One title on goal average. However, he was released on a free transfer in 1969 and later stated he felt he had been badly treated by the club.

Holt, who earned five caps for Scotland national side, also represented Great Britain at the 1960 Summer Olympics (being able to do so as he played for Queen's Park who operated on an amateur basis).

Holt later worked as a taxi driver for many years.
