= Lugar Boswell Thistle F.C. =

Association football club in Scotland

Lugar Boswell Thistle
- Full name: Lugar Boswell Thistle Football Club
- Nickname: The Jaggy Bunnets
- Founded: 1878 (as Lugar Boswell)
- Ground: Rosebank Park, Lugar
- Capacity: 2,000
- Coordinates: 55°28′4″N 4°13′25″W
- Manager: Dean Keenan
- League: West of Scotland League Third Division
- 2025–26: West of Scotland League Third Division, 15th of 16
Home colours	Away colours

Lugar Boswell Thistle Football Club are a Scottish football club, based in the village of Lugar, near Cumnock, Ayrshire. Members of the Scottish Junior Football Association, they currently play in the West of Scotland League Third Division. Their home ground since 1882 is Rosebank Park, and they wear maroon home strips and light blue away strips.

== History ==
Formed in 1878 as Lugar Boswell, the club were originally a Senior side playing such currently distinguished names as Rangers and Heart of Midlothian. The club made nine consecutive Scottish Cup appearances in the 1880s and reached the fifth round of the competition in 1882–83, losing to eventual finalists Vale of Leven. In March 1883, they recorded a 10–2 victory over Hearts which remains the Edinburgh club's record defeat. The following season, forward Sam Thomson was capped twice for Scotland. As success faded, the club then flitted between various Senior, Junior and even Juvenile leagues up to the Second World War. On reforming after hostilities, the club added the suffix Thistle and settled in Ayrshire Junior football.

The Jaggy Bunnets as they are nicknamed enjoyed a successful period in the 1950s. The club reached the semi-final of the Scottish Junior Cup in 1952, losing to Kilbirnie Ladeside after a replay with one tie attracting a then record attendance of over 30,000 to Rugby Park, Kilmarnock. In 1956, the club made it all the way to the final, with Thistle losing 4–1 to Petershill at Hampden Park in front of a crowd of 64,702. The current population of Lugar is 221.

With the club in danger of folding in 2015, Lugar entered a partnership with the Ayr United Football Academy where the SPFL club provided coaching staff and gave Ayr's pro-youth players game time in an adult footballing environment. In March 2016, Lugar announced that this arrangement would not continue beyond the end of the 2015–16 season and the club appointed Derek McMurdo as their new manager in the summer of 2016.

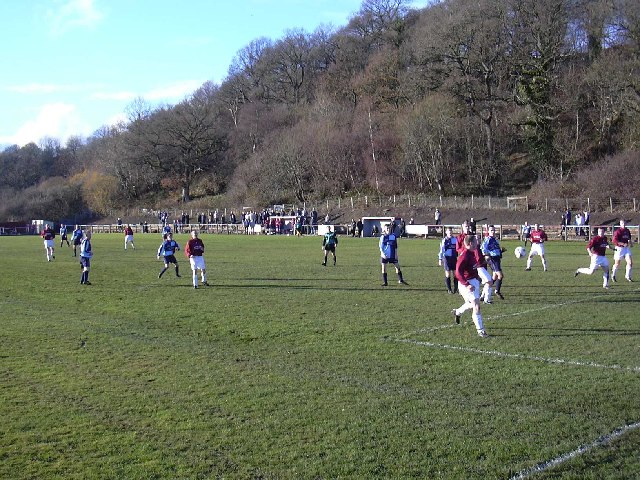
Home game at Rosebank in 2003, Lugar seemingly in their away strip

== Notable former players ==
- John Auld - Scottish International, who later played for Sunderland (1890–1895) and Newcastle United (1896–1897).
- Sam Thomson - Two caps for Scotland in 1884. Later played for Rangers and was a member of the famous "Invincibles" at Preston North End.
- Andy Kerr - Partick Thistle, Kilmarnock and Scotland.
- Jimmy Collins - Scottish Junior international. Played for Tottenham Hotspur and Brighton.
- Bertie Black - Scottish Football League champion with Kilmarnock in 1964–65 and Scottish League international.
- Joe Mason - Kilmarnock FC, Rangers and Greenock Morton player.
- Cameron Menzies - Scottish darts player, who played for Lugar Boswell Thistle before taking on darts

== Honours ==
=== Scottish Junior Cup ===
- Runners-up: 1955–56

=== Other Honours ===
- Western League champions: 1953–54, 1955–56
- Ayrshire Second Division winners: 1995–96, 1999–2000
- Ayrshire (Ardrossan & Saltcoats Herald) Cup winners: 1927–28, 1928–29
- Ayrshire District (Irvine Times) Cup winners: 1929–30, 1948–49
- Ayrshire District League winners: 2002–03
