= Willie Polland =

Scottish footballer

Personal information
- Full name: William Polland
- Date of birth: 28 July 1934
- Place of birth: Armadale, Scotland
- Date of death: 12 February 2010 (aged 75)
- Place of death: Scotland
- Position: Defender

Senior career*
Years	Team	Apps	(Gls)
1955–1961	Raith Rovers	188	(3)
1961–1967	Heart of Midlothian	147	(2)
1967–1970	Raith Rovers	77	(1)
- * Club domestic league appearances and goals

William Polland (28 July 1934 – 12 February 2010) was a Scottish footballer who played for Raith Rovers and Heart of Midlothian. Polland, a defender, began his career with Raith Rovers in 1955, and played about 200 games for the Kirkcaldy club before he was signed by Hearts in April 1961.

At Hearts, Polland was a member of the team that won the Scottish League Cup in 1962, and the team that lost out of the 1964–65 league title on goal average. In total, he played 221 competitive first-team matches for Hearts before returning to Raith in March 1967, where he spent the remainder of his career. He retired from football in 1970, following Raith's relegation from the top flight.

After football, Polland ran a building firm, and worked as a publican in his hometown Armadale.
