= Joe Mason (footballer, born 1940) =

Scottish footballer (1940–2019)

Personal information
- Full name: Joseph Mason
- Date of birth: 17 August 1940
- Place of birth: Kilmarnock, Scotland
- Date of death: 26 September 2019 (aged 79)
- Position: Forward

Youth career
- Lugar Boswell Thistle

Senior career*
Years	Team	Apps	(Gls)
1961–1966	Kilmarnock	47	(23)
1966–1972	Morton	191	(77)
1972–1973	Rangers	16	(2)
- * Club domestic league appearances and goals

Joseph Mason (17 August 1940 – 26 September 2019) was a Scottish professional football player who is best known for his time with Greenock Morton and Rangers.

== Playing career ==
Mason made his professional debut for Kilmarnock after joining from junior side Lugar Boswell Thistle. He made the bulk of his league appearances when he moved to Morton in May 1966. Mason joined Rangers in October 1972.

== Coaching career ==
Mason retired from playing and joined the Rangers coach staff under Jock Wallace and later John Greig. However, upon the former's return in 1983, Wallace decided to make changes to the coaching team, bringing in Alex Totten as first team coach and allowed Tommy McLean, David Provan and Mason to leave.

He died in September 2019 at the age of 79.
