= Jimmy Brown (footballer, born 1925) =

Scottish footballer

Personal information
- Full name: James Robertson Brown
- Date of birth: 19 July 1925
- Place of birth: Buckhaven, Scotland
- Date of death: 7 November 2008 (aged 83)
- Position: Goalkeeper

Youth career
- Bayview YC

Senior career*
Years	Team	Apps	(Gls)
1942–1953	Heart of Midlothian	167	(0)
1953–1960	Kilmarnock	231	(0)
1960–1962	St Mirren	44	(0)
1962–1963	Stranraer	2	(0)
1963	Falkirk	4	(0)
- Polish White Eagles
Total		448	(0)
- * Club domestic league appearances and goals

James Robertson Brown (19 July 1925 – 7 November 2008) was a Scottish football goalkeeper, who played for Heart of Midlothian, Kilmarnock, St Mirren, Stranraer and Falkirk in the Scottish Football League. He was also temporarily loaned to Southend and East Fife.

Brown played for Scotland in every match of a tour of North America in 1949. The last match of the tour was against the United States, but the Scottish Football Association does not consider this match to be a full international.
