= Ronnie Hamilton =

Scottish footballer

Personal information
- Date of birth: 24 April 1945 (age 81)
- Place of birth: Kilmarnock, Scotland
- Position: Centre forward

Youth career
- –1961: Saxone Youth Club
- 1961: Kilmarnock

Senior career*
Years	Team	Apps	(Gls)
1961–1966	Kilmarnock	60	(38)
1966–1971	St Mirren	102	(18)
1971–1975	Queen of the South	83	(25)
- * Club domestic league appearances and goals

Ronald Hamilton (born 24 April 1945) is a Scottish retired professional footballer who played in the Scottish League for Kilmarnock, St Mirren and Queen of the South as a centre forward. He is best remembered for his time as player, assistant manager, coach, scout and chairman of Kilmarnock. At the time of his debut as a player for Kilmarnock, Hamilton was the club's youngest ever player and the youngest post-war Scottish League First Division player. As of June 2022, he had served as president of Ardeer Thistle for more than 30 years.

== Personal life ==
Hamilton attended Kilmarnock Academy. As of 2007, he was working as a chartered accountant.

== Career statistics ==
Appearances and goals by club, season and competition
Club	Season	League			Scottish Cup		League Cup		Europe		Total	
Club	Season	Division	Apps	Goals	Apps	Goals	Apps	Goals	Apps	Goals	Apps	Goals
Kilmarnock	1961–62	Scottish First Division	4	3	0	0	0	0	—		4	3
Kilmarnock	1962–63	Scottish First Division	11	6	1	0	0	0	—		12	6
Kilmarnock	1963–64	Scottish First Division	4	5	0	0	3	1	—		7	6
Kilmarnock	1964–65	Scottish First Division	28	15	4	1	4	3	3 (Note: Appearances in Inter-Cities Fairs Cup)	2	39	21
Kilmarnock	1965–66	Scottish First Division	13	9	0	0	2	0	3 (Note: Appearances in European Cup)	0	18	9
Career total			60	38	5	1	9	4	6	2	80	45

== Honours ==
Kilmarnock

- Scottish League First Division: 1964–65

St Mirren

- Scottish League Second Division: 1967–68

Individual

- Kilmarnock Hall of Fame
