= Billy Higgins (Scottish footballer) =

Scottish footballer

Personal information
- Date of birth: 15 March 1940 (age 86)
- Place of birth: Edinburgh, Scotland
- Position: Midfielder

Senior career*
Years	Team	Apps	(Gls)
1957–1967	Hearts	194	(11)
- Durban City
Total		?	(?)

International career
1960–1962	Scotland U23	4	(0)
1962	SFL trial v SFA	1	(0)
- * Club domestic league appearances and goals

Billy Higgins (born 15 March 1940) is a Scottish former footballer. He played at wing half for Hearts including 197 league appearances. He emigrated to South Africa in 1967 to play for Durban City.
