= Hugh Brown (footballer, born 1940) =

Scottish footballer

Personal information
- Full name: Hugh Brown
- Date of birth: 6 November 1940 (age 85)
- Position: Inside forward

Youth career
- Kilmarnock Amateurs

Senior career*
Years	Team	Apps	(Gls)
1958–1968	Kilmarnock	129	(15)
1968–1969	Dumbarton	15	(0)
- * Club domestic league appearances and goals

Hugh Brown (born 6 November 1940) was a Scottish footballer who played for Kilmarnock and Dumbarton.
