= 1963–64 Scottish Division One =

58th season of top-tier football league in Scotland

Scottish Division One
- Season: 1963–64
- Champions: Rangers
- Relegated: Queen of the South; East Stirlingshire

The 1963–64 Scottish Division One was won by Rangers by six points over nearest rival Kilmarnock. Queen of the South and East Stirlingshire finished 17th and 18th respectively and were relegated to the 1964-65 Second Division.

== League table ==
Pos	Team	Pld	W	D	L	GF	GA	GR	Pts	Qualification or relegation
1	Rangers (C)	34	25	5	4	85	31	2.742	55	
2	Kilmarnock	34	22	5	7	77	40	1.925	49	
3	Celtic	34	19	9	6	89	34	2.618	47	
4	Hearts	34	19	9	6	74	40	1.850	47	
5	Dunfermline	34	18	9	7	64	33	1.939	45	
6	Dundee	34	20	5	9	94	50	1.880	45	
7	Partick Thistle	34	15	5	14	55	54	1.019	35	
8	Dundee United	34	13	8	13	65	49	1.327	34	
9	Aberdeen	34	12	8	14	53	53	1.000	32	
10	Hibernian	34	12	6	16	59	66	0.894	30	
11	Motherwell	34	9	11	14	51	62	0.823	29	
12	St Mirren	34	12	5	17	44	74	0.595	29	
13	St Johnstone	34	11	6	17	54	70	0.771	28	
14	Falkirk	34	11	6	17	54	84	0.643	28	
15	Airdrieonians	34	11	4	19	52	97	0.536	26	
16	Third Lanark	34	9	7	18	47	74	0.635	25	
17	Queen of the South (R)	34	5	6	23	40	92	0.435	16	Relegated to the Second Division
18	East Stirlingshire (R)	34	5	2	27	37	91	0.407	12	Relegated to the Second Division

Source: RSSSF
(C) Champions; (R) Relegated

== Results ==
Home \ Away	ABE	AIR	CEL	DND	DNU	DNF	EST	FAL	HOM	HIB	KIL	MOT	PAR	QOS	RAN	STJ	STM	THI
Aberdeen		2–2	0–3	2–4	0–0	0–1	4–1	3–0	1–2	3–1	0–0	6–2	0–5	3–0	1–1	0–1	0–2	1–1
Airdrieonians	1–7		0–2	3–1	3–1	0–0	5–2	2–5	0–2	5–3	4–5	1–1	2–0	2–1	0–4	3–3	2–4	1–0
Celtic	3–0	9–0		2–1	1–0	2–2	5–2	7–0	1–1	5–0	5–0	2–1	5–3	4–0	0–1	3–1	3–0	4–4
Dundee	1–4	4–0	1–1		1–1	2–1	3–1	4–3	2–4	3–0	2–1	1–3	5–2	6–2	1–1	2–1	9–2	6–0
Dundee United	1–2	9–1	0–3	2–1		1–2	2–0	3–1	0–0	1–1	2–1	4–1	1–2	2–1	2–3	3–1	6–2	4–1
Dunfermline Athletic	3–1	5–1	1–0	1–2	4–2		4–1	1–0	2–2	3–0	2–3	2–0	0–0	0–0	1–4	4–0	5–0	3–0
East Stirlingshire	2–1	1–2	1–5	1–5	1–1	0–2		1–2	2–3	1–3	0–2	0–0	1–0	4–0	0–5	0–1	2–1	2–3
Falkirk	2–3	2–1	1–0	0–2	2–1	2–2	1–0		1–2	1–4	1–1	0–4	3–0	3–2	0–1	1–1	2–0	2–2
Heart of Midlothian	0–0	4–0	1–1	1–3	0–4	2–1	4–0	4–1		4–2	1–1	1–1	4–1	0–1	1–2	3–3	5–1	4–1
Hibernian	2–0	2–1	1–1	0–4	2–3	0–0	5–2	2–2	1–1		0–2	3–1	2–1	5–2	0–1	4–1	1–0	3–0
Kilmarnock	2–0	4–1	4–0	1–1	2–0	0–3	4–1	9–2	3–1	2–1		5–2	3–0	2–1	1–1	4–1	2–0	2–0
Motherwell	0–1	3–0	0–4	2–2	0–3	1–1	4–1	3–0	0–1	4–3	2–0		2–1	0–0	3–3	1–3	3–0	1–1
Partick Thistle	1–1	1–0	2–2	2–0	1–0	0–1	3–2	4–1	2–1	2–1	2–0	0–0		6–1	0–3	2–1	2–1	0–1
Queen of the South	2–3	3–1	0–2	0–5	1–1	1–2	2–1	3–6	1–4	3–2	0–4	2–2	1–2		1–4	0–3	1–1	2–4
Rangers	0–0	4–1	2–1	2–1	2–0	2–1	3–1	4–0	0–3	5–0	2–0	5–1	4–3	2–0		2–3	2–3	2–1
St Johnstone	3–1	0–1	1–1	1–6	2–2	3–2	3–0	5–0	1–4	0–4	0–2	1–1	2–3	2–3	1–0		2–1	0–1
St Mirren	3–1	2–4	2–1	2–1	2–1	1–1	2–1	0–0	0–2	1–1	1–3	2–1	0–0	3–2	0–3	2–1		1–0
Third Lanark	1–2	1–2	1–1	1–2	2–2	0–1	1–2	3–7	0–2	1–0	1–2	3–1	3–2	1–1	0–5	4–2	4–2	

Legend: Blue = home team win; Yellow = draw; Red = away team win.
