= Billy Muir =

Scottish footballer

Personal information
- Full name: William McKie Muir
- Date of birth: 6 May 1934 (age 92)
- Position: Forward

Youth career
- Kilmarnock Amateurs

Senior career*
Years	Team	Apps	(Gls)
1956–1963	Kilmarnock	138	(29)
1962–1963	Clyde	15	(4)
1963–1964	Queen of the South	13	(2)
1964–1965	Ayr United	26	(0)
1965–1966	Dumbarton	18	(2)
- * Club domestic league appearances and goals

William McKie Muir (born 6 May 1934) is a Scottish former footballer who played for Kilmarnock, Clyde, Queen of the South, Ayr United and Dumbarton.
