= Bobby Kennedy (footballer) =

Scottish footballer (1937–2025)

Personal information
- Full name: Robert Kennedy
- Date of birth: 23 June 1937
- Place of birth: Motherwell, Scotland
- Date of death: 11 January 2025 (aged 87)
- Positions: Wing half; full-back

Senior career*
Years	Team	Apps	(Gls)
- Coltness United
1957–1961	Kilmarnock	85	(1)
1961–1969	Manchester City	254	(9)
1969	Grimsby Town	84	(1)
1972–1973	Drogheda	3	(0)

International career
1969	Scotland U23	1	(0)

Managerial career
- 1969–1971: Grimsby Town
- 1975–1978: Bradford City
- * Club domestic league appearances and goals

Robert Kennedy (23 June 1937 – 11 January 2025) was a Scottish footballer, who played as a wing half or full-back.

== Playing career ==
Bobby Kennedy started his career at Coltness United and after trials with Queen of the South and Clyde he joined Kilmarnock in 1957. While at Kilmarnock he overcame serious illness to continue his career, which included one cap for Scotland Under 23s. He returned to the Kilmarnock team which were Scottish League Division One and Scottish Cup runners-up in 1959–60 and Division One and Scottish League Cup runners-up in 1960–61.

In July 1961 Manchester City paid £45,000 for Kennedy after 85 games with Kilmarnock. He played for Manchester City for eight seasons, including the Division One championship-winning side in 1967–68 although he had not played enough games to qualify for a medal. He played 254 league and cup games, including European competitions, before he moved to Grimsby Town as player-manager for £9,000, where he played 88 first-team games.

Kennedy signed for Drogheda United in January 1973 and made his League of Ireland debut on 4 February at Lourdes Stadium.

On 16 October 2021, it was announced by Manchester City, that Kennedy, along with teammate Stan Horne and the families of teammates, Harry Dowd and Paul Hince would be receiving winners medals for the Division One championship-winning season in 1967–68 during half-time at that day's Premier League match against Burnley at the City of Manchester Stadium, after the club's official request to the EFL, that medals be awarded to Stan, Paul, Bobby and posthumously to Harry, was approved in January 2021. The medals were presented by Manchester City Ambassador and former teammate of the recipients, Mike Summerbee.

== Managerial career ==
Kennedy became player-manager at Grimsby Town in 1969. Grimsby had to apply for re-election in Kennedy's first season as they came 23rd in Division Four. In the following two seasons, Grimsby came 16th and 19th, before Kennedy resigned in May 1971.

He became Bradford City's coach and youth team manager, before he had a brief spell with Dundalk. He returned to Bradford, first at City then as honorary manager at Bradford Park Avenue. He returned to Bradford City for a third time in January 1975 when he succeeded Bryan Edwards as manager. He led City to 10th in Division Four in his first season before becoming the club's first manager of the month in January 1976. The club also reached the quarter-finals of the FA Cup in the same year. Further awards followed as he helped the club to promotion to Division Three in 1976–77. He was sacked in January 1978 in the middle of a seven-game losing streak.

He became coach at Blackburn Rovers before leaving football altogether.

== After football ==
Kennedy and his family remained in Bradford while owning various clothing shops along with his wife, Barbara, in Manchester and the North West of England.

His daughter, Lorraine, was also a football player, playing as a forward for Bradford City Women and at international level for Scotland, before moving into coaching and managing Bradford City. His son, Graeme, played football to a semi-professional level, as a goalkeeper, before coaching at the academies of FC Halifax Town, and then Bradford City.

Bobby Kennedy died on 11 January 2025, at the age of 87.

== Managerial statistics ==
Team	Nat	Year	Record				
Team	Nat	Year	G	W	D	L	Win %
Grimsby Town	England	1969–1971	110	34	28	48	30.91
Bradford City	England	1975–1978	157	54	49	54	34.39
Career total			267	88	77	102	32.96
