= 1964–65 in Scottish football =

Division One champions
- Kilmarnock

Division Two champions
- Stirling Albion

Scottish Cup winners
- Celtic

League Cup winners
- Rangers

Junior Cup winners
- Linlithgow Rose

Teams in Europe
- Celtic, Dundee, Dunfermline Athletic, Kilmarnock, Rangers

Scotland national team
- 1965 BHC, 1966 World Cup qualification

The 1964–65 season was the 92nd season of competitive football in Scotland and the 68th season of Scottish league football.

== Scottish League Division One ==
In one of the closest finishes ever seen in a league competition in Britain, Hearts were home to Kilmarnock on the last day of the season with a two-point lead over the Ayrshire club and a slightly better goal average (goals scored divided by goals conceded). Kilmarnock had to beat Hearts by at least 2–0 to win the title. Any worse result for Kilmarnock, including any other two goal winning margin, e.g. 3–1 or 4–2, would have made Hearts champions. Kilmarnock won 2–0 and were champions.

The 1964–65 season is also notable for both Celtic and Rangers finishing in mid-table. It was, and remains as of 2025, only the fifth time that neither of them had finished in the top two, and the only time that both of the Old Firm clubs had failed to finish in the top three of the First Division in the same season.

This was the only season that East Stirling Clydebank (E.S. Clydebank) competed in the Scottish League, reverting to East Stirlingshire for season 1965–66 with Clydebank entering the league the following year.

Pos	Team	Pld	W	D	L	GF	GA	GAv	Pts	Qualification or relegation
1	Kilmarnock	34	22	6	6	62	33	1.879	50	Champions
2	Hearts	34	22	6	6	90	49	1.837	50	
3	Dunfermline Athletic	34	22	5	7	83	36	2.306	49	
4	Hibernian	34	21	4	9	75	47	1.596	46	
5	Rangers	34	18	8	8	78	35	2.229	44	
6	Dundee	34	15	10	9	86	63	1.365	40	
7	Clyde	34	17	6	11	64	58	1.103	40	
8	Celtic	34	16	5	13	76	57	1.333	37	
9	Dundee United	34	15	6	13	59	51	1.157	36	
10	Morton	34	13	7	14	54	54	1.000	33	
11	Partick Thistle	34	11	10	13	57	58	0.983	32	
12	Aberdeen	34	12	8	14	59	75	0.787	32	
13	St Johnstone	34	9	11	14	57	62	0.919	29	
14	Motherwell	34	10	8	16	45	54	0.833	28	
15	St Mirren	34	9	6	19	38	70	0.543	24	
16	Falkirk	34	7	7	20	43	85	0.506	21	
17	Airdrieonians	34	5	4	25	48	110	0.436	14	Relegated to the 1965–66 Second Division
18	Third Lanark	34	3	1	30	22	99	0.222	7	Relegated to the 1965–66 Second Division

Source: RSSSF

Champions: Kilmarnock
Relegated: Airdrieonians, Third Lanark

== Scottish League Division Two ==
Pos	Team	Pld	W	D	L	GF	GA	GD	Pts	Promotion or relegation
1	Stirling Albion	36	26	7	3	84	31	+53	59	Promotion to the 1965–66 First Division
2	Hamilton Academical	36	21	8	7	86	53	+33	50	Promotion to the 1965–66 First Division
3	Queen of the South	36	16	13	7	84	50	+34	45	
4	Queen's Park	36	17	9	10	57	41	+16	43	
5	E. S. Clydebank	36	15	10	11	64	50	+14	40	
6	Stranraer	36	17	6	13	74	64	+10	40	
7	Arbroath	36	13	13	10	56	51	+5	39	
8	Berwick Rangers	36	15	9	12	73	70	+3	39	
9	East Fife	36	15	7	14	78	77	+1	37	
10	Alloa Athletic	36	14	8	14	71	81	−10	36	
11	Albion Rovers	36	14	5	17	56	60	−4	33	
12	Cowdenbeath	36	11	10	15	55	62	−7	32	
13	Raith Rovers	36	9	14	13	54	61	−7	32	
14	Dumbarton	36	13	6	17	55	67	−12	32	
15	Stenhousemuir	36	11	8	17	49	74	−25	30	
16	Montrose	36	10	9	17	80	91	−11	29	
17	Forfar Athletic	36	9	7	20	63	89	−26	25	
18	Ayr United	36	9	6	21	49	67	−18	24	
19	Brechin City	36	6	7	23	53	102	−49	19	

Promoted: Stirling Albion, Hamilton Academical

== Cup honours ==
Competition	Winner	Score	Runner-up
Scottish Cup 1964–65	Celtic	3 – 2	Dunfermline Athletic
League Cup 1964–65	Rangers	2 – 1	Celtic
Junior Cup	Linlithgow Rose	4 – 1	Baillieston Juniors

== Other honours ==
=== National ===
Competition	Winner	Score	Runner-up
Scottish Qualifying Cup - North	Inverness Caledonian	4 – 2 *	Ross County
Scottish Qualifying Cup - South	Gala Fairydean	9 – 5 *	Glasgow University

=== County ===
Competition	Winner	Score	Runner-up
Aberdeenshire Cup	Peterhead		
Ayrshire Cup	Ayr United	1 – 0	Kilmarnock
East of Scotland Shield	Hearts	3 – 1	Hibernian
Fife Cup	Dunfermline Athletic	9 – 4 *	Raith Rovers
Forfarshire Cup	Dundee United	1 – 0	Dundee
Glasgow Cup	Celtic	5 – 0	Queens Park
Lanarkshire Cup	Airdrie		
Renfrewshire Cup	Morton	7 – 4 *	St Mirren
Stirlingshire Cup	Dumbarton	4 – 2 *	Falkirk

^{*} - aggregate over two legs

=== Highland League ===
Top Three
Pos	Team	Pld	W	D	L	GF	GA	GD	Pts
1	Elgin City	30	21	4	5	109	52	+57	46
2	Nairn County	30	21	3	6	99	64	+35	45
3	Inverness Caledonian	30	18	5	7	104	68	+36	41

== Individual honours ==
Award	Winner	Club
Footballer of the Year	(Scotland) Billy McNeill	Celtic

== Scotland national team ==
Date	Venue	Opponents	Score	Competition	Scotland scorer(s)
3 October 1964	Ninian Park, Cardiff (A)	Wales	2–3	BHC	Stevie Chalmers, Dave Gibson
21 October 1964	Hampden Park, Glasgow (H)	Finland	3–1	WCQG8	Denis Law, Dave Gibson, Stevie Chalmers
25 November 1964	Hampden Park, Glasgow (H)	Northern Ireland	3–2	BHC	Davie Wilson (2), Alan Gilzean
10 April 1965	Wembley Stadium, London (A)	England	2–2	BHC	Denis Law, Ian St. John
8 May 1965	Hampden Park, Glasgow (H)	Spain	0–0	Friendly	
23 May 1965	Silesia Stadium, Chorzów / Katowice (A)	Poland	1–1	WCQG8	Denis Law
27 May 1965	Olympiastadion, Helsinki (A)	Finland	2–1	WCQG8	Davie Wilson, John Greig

- Scotland came third in the 1965 British Home Championship

Key:

- (H) = Home match
- (A) = Away match
- WCQG8 = World Cup qualifying - Group 8
- BHC = British Home Championship
