= Andy Kerr (footballer, born 1931) =

Scottish footballer

Personal information
- Full name: Andrew Kerr
- Date of birth: 29 June 1931
- Place of birth: Lugar, Ayrshire, Scotland
- Date of death: 24 December 1997 (aged 66)
- Place of death: Aberdeen, Scotland
- Position: Centre forward

Youth career
- Lugar Boswell Thistle

Senior career*
Years	Team	Apps	(Gls)
1952–1959	Partick Thistle	163	(30)
1959	Manchester City	10	(0)
1959–1963	Kilmarnock	101	(90)
1963–1964	Sunderland	18	(5)
1963–1965	Aberdeen	14	(7)
Total		306	(132)

International career
1955	Scotland	2	(0)
1955–1957	Scottish League XI	2	(0)
1956	Scotland B	1	(0)
1958–1961	SFL trial v SFA	3	(3)
- * Club domestic league appearances and goals

Andrew Kerr (29 June 1931 – 24 December 1997) was a Scottish footballer, who played for Partick Thistle, Manchester City, Kilmarnock, Sunderland, Aberdeen, Inverness club Caledonian in the Highland Football League and also Glentoran in the Northern Ireland Football League.

Kerr started his career with Lugar Boswell Thistle in the Scottish Juniors having been born in the village of Lugar. Kerr also won two caps for Scotland, both of them in 1955. He was initially a defender and achieved his international recognition in that position, but achieved greater success at club level after being converted to a centre forward.
