= Frank Beattie =

Scottish footballer and manager

Personal information
- Full name: Frank Whitfield Beattie
- Date of birth: 17 October 1933
- Place of birth: Stirling, Scotland
- Date of death: 19 November 2009 (aged 76)
- Position: Midfielder

Youth career
- Dunipace Juveniles
- Cowie Juveniles

Senior career*
Years	Team	Apps	(Gls)
1953	Bonnybridge Juniors		
1953–1972	Kilmarnock	422	(34)

International career
1961	Scottish League XI	1	(0)
1964	SFL trial v SFA	1	(0)

Managerial career
- 1972–1973: Albion Rovers
- 1973–1974: Stirling Albion
- * Club domestic league appearances and goals

Frank Whitfield Beattie (17 October 1933 – 19 November 2009) was a Scottish football player and manager. He spent his entire senior playing career with Kilmarnock, making 422 league appearances between 1954 and 1972. He was captain of Kilmarnock when they won the Scottish league championship in 1964–65. After retiring as a player, Beattie managed Albion Rovers and Stirling Albion.

== Early life ==
Frank Beattie was born in St Ninian's, Stirling on 17 October 1933. He started playing football at an early age for his school St Modan's in Stirling, and later moved up to juvenile level with Dunipace and Cowie before joining Bonnybridge Juniors. During his short time at Bonnybridge, scouts from several Scottish clubs were looking at him, and, in October 1953, and just six weeks after signing for Bonnybridge, Beattie signed for Kilmarnock.

== Kilmarnock ==
Brought to Kilmarnock by the then manager Malky MacDonald, Beattie spent the first season playing for the reserve team. His favoured position was inside-left, but he first played for Kilmarnock in an unfamiliar role on the right of the attack during his debut against St Mirren in a League Cup tie at Love Street on 4 September 1954. This did not impact on his performance, because he scored the goal to give his side the lead at half time. The game ended in a 3–2 defeat for Kilmarnock and Beattie was dropped for the first League game of the season the following week. He made his Scottish Football League debut against Partick Thistle on 9 October 1954. Like the game at Love Street, Beattie scored the only goal of the first half but again Kilmarnock lost the game. He did do enough to keep his place in the team for the next two games, but struggled to stay in the team during his first full season. That was the only season that he played in a Kilmarnock team that was threatened by relegation.

At the start of Beattie's second season with Kilmarnock he was still not a regular starter, and played in only one of the opening ten League Cup and league games. When He did get his chance in the team he took it, missing just one of the 33 subsequent matches that season. One of the games he played in was Kilmarnock's victory against Celtic at Parkhead. Kilmarnock finished that season in 8th place, their highest position for twenty years. Beattie still struggled to hold down a permanent place in the team but this was mainly down to the fact that he was a very versatile player. It was only after the appointment of new manager Willie Waddell in 1957 that Beattie eventually nailed down a position in the team at right-half; after that switch of position, he never appeared in the forward line again.

In Beattie's first full season at right-half in 1959–60, Kilmarnock enjoyed their most successful season up to that point, finishing as runners-up in the Scottish Football League for the first time in their history, mounting a sustained title challenge, but eventually finished four points behind eventual winners Hearts. Kilmarnock also finished runners up in the Scottish Cup to Rangers. For their efforts Kilmarnock were rewarded with a trip across the Atlantic to play in the International Soccer Tournament. Kilmarnock played very well in America beating Burnley and FC Bayern Munich en route to the Final where they were beaten by Brazilians Bangu. The following season they got the League Cup Final where once again Rangers stood in the way – Rangers went on to win the match 2–0 which meant that in the last six months Kilmarnock had finished runners-up in four competitions and Beattie had two losing finalist's medals. During this season he played a few games at left-half deputising for Bobby Kennedy.

The following season Kilmarnock finished second in the league, just one point behind Rangers and were again rewarded with a trip to America to compete in the International Soccer Tournament, but this time was not as successful as before. With Bobby Kennedy leaving the club in the summer of 1962, Beattie was moved to left-half permanently. In the 1962–63 League Cup, Kilmarnock once again got to the final where the played Hearts, who took the lead midway through the first half. Beattie almost scored the equaliser but was denied by Gordon Marshall. With just thirty seconds left, Kilmarnock had a free kick which was floated high into the Hearts box where Beattie outjumped everyone to seemingly head home for an equaliser, but the referee had already blown for a free kick to Hearts. At the end of the season Beattie had managed to play in every single one of Kilmarnock's 52 games and also won the Player of the Year award.

Beattie was awarded with the captaincy in November 1963 and his first game as captain was against Rangers in the league which ended in a 1–1 draw. For the fourth time in five years Kilmarnock finished runners-up in the league, but this time they were allowed to play in Europe.

The 1964–65 season was the greatest season in Kilmarnock's history and Beattie played a key role as captain. The club was drawn against Eintracht Frankfurt in the Fairs Cup in their first ever European game (Eintracht had lost to Real Madrid in the final of the European Cup just four years earlier). Kilmarnock left Frankfurt with a 3–0 deficit to overcome in the home leg. The game at Rugby Park was one of the most incredible matches ever witnessed in the ground's history: Kilmarnock fell further behind after just four minutes but by half-time they led on the night 2–1. In the second half Killie scored again and then leveled the tie on aggregate before scoring the winner with two minutes left to play. During the game the supporters invaded the pitch three times as the excitement mounted. Kilmarnock's run in Europe was ended by Everton. The next game they played after being beaten by Everton was against Rangers, which they drew 1–1 thanks to Beattie's only goal in his 53 games that season.

Going into the last game of the season, Kilmarnock still had a chance of winning the title but they would have to beat Hearts (who were top of the league) by scoring at least two goals and to not concede anything, because the league was decided by goal average instead of goal difference. The game was a tight affair but Kilmarnock took a 2–0 lead within thirty minutes, prompting Hearts to bombard the Kilmarnock goal; however the visitors withstood the barrage to win the title by one point. This also meant that Kilmarnock would play in the European Cup for the first time. Beattie became the first Kilmarnock captain to bring a national trophy to Rugby Park since Mattha Smith in 1929.

In Kilmarnock's first game in the European Cup, Beattie played at centre-half against Albanians 17 Nentori Tirana. Kilmarnock won the tie 1–0 on aggregate. In the next round they played Real Madrid but lost the tie. The next season was to be Kilmarnock's best season in Europe as they reached the semi-finals of the Fairs Cup, getting knocked out by Leeds United. The following two seasons Beattie played less and came on as a substitute for only the second time in his career in a match against Raith Rovers: Kilmarnock were down 4–0 at half time when he was brought on and by full-time it was 4–4.

Beattie broke Mattha Smith's club record for most league appearances by playing against Celtic; during the match he and Jimmy Johnstone collided just fifteen minutes in – Beattie broke his right leg. At the age of 36 most people thought that his career was over. Walter McCrae did not think so and signed him up for the following season. Even though Beattie did not feature that season he was awarded with a testimonial match. He made his come back from injury against Clyde in a reserves match. At the end of the season his testimonial took place, with Celtic the team chosen as opponents. The result was 7–2 to Celtic, with a young Kenny Dalglish scoring six goals. Beattie made his last appearance for Kilmarnock against Motherwell, pushing him over 600 appearances for Kilmarnock.

After his retirement, Beattie ran a newsagent in his home village of Cambusbarron. He took over as manager of local amateur side Cambusbarron Rovers in 1976, and two years later led the team to victory in the Scottish Amateur Cup.

== Death ==
After suffering from Parkinson's Disease for 10 years, Beattie died on 19 November 2009 at the age of 76. During the SPL match played between Kilmarnock and Hearts on 28 November, a minute's silence was held in his memory.

On Sunday 22 August 2010, ahead of the first home match of the season against Motherwell, Kilmarnock invited the family of Frank Beattie to Rugby Park to witness the renaming of the West Stand, to be referred to from then on as the Frank Beattie Stand.

== Career statistics ==
Club performance			League		Cup		League Cup		Continental		Total	
Season	Club	League	Apps	Goals	Apps	Goals	Apps	Goals	Apps	Goals	Apps	Goals
1954–55	Kilmarnock	Division One	15	3	0	0	1	1	0	0	16	4
1955–56	Kilmarnock	Division One	29	10	3	2	0	0	0	0	32	12
1956–57	Kilmarnock	Division One	21	7	2	1	4	0	0	0	27	8
1957–58	Kilmarnock	Division One	20	8	0	0	7	2	0	0	27	10
1958–59	Kilmarnock	Division One	27	0	3	0	0	0	0	0	30	10
1959–60	Kilmarnock	Division One	33	1	7	0	0	0	6	0	46	1
1960–61	Kilmarnock	Division One	28	0	1	0	10	1	6	0	45	1
1961–62	Kilmarnock	Division One	30	1	3	0	6	2	0	0	39	3
1962–63	Kilmarnock	Division One	34	1	2	0	10	1	6	0	52	2
1963–64	Kilmarnock	Division One	33	1	5	1	3	1	8	0	49	3
1964–65	Kilmarnock	Division One	31	1	4	0	6	0	13	0	54	1
1965–66	Kilmarnock	Division One	30	0	4	1	9	0	2	0	45	1
1966–67	Kilmarnock	Division One	29	1	2	0	6	0	8	0	45	1
1967–68	Kilmarnock	Division One	25	0	0	0	6	0	0	0	39	0
1968–69	Kilmarnock	Division One	28	0	4	0	2	0	6	0	40	0
1969–70	Kilmarnock	Division One	8	0	0	0	5	0	5	0	18	0
1970–71	Kilmarnock	Division One	0	0	0	0	0	0	0	0	0	0
1971–72	Kilmarnock	Division One	1	0	0	0	5	1	0	0	6	1
Career total			422	34	40	5	80	9	60	0	602	48

== Honours ==
- Scottish league championship winner: 1964–65
- Scottish Cup: Runner-up 1959–60
- Scottish League Cup: Runner-up 1960–61, 1962–63
