= Jim Richmond =

Scottish footballer (1932–2019)

Personal information
- Date of birth: 13 October 1932
- Place of birth: Blantyre, South Lanarkshire, Scotland
- Date of death: 2 November 2019 (aged 87)
- Position: Fullback

Youth career
- Bridgeton Waverley F.C.
- Beith Juniors

Senior career*
Years	Team	Apps	(Gls)
1955–1958	Hamilton Academical	104	(2)
1958–1959	Falkirk	47	(0)
1959–1963	Kilmarnock	116	(4)
1963–1967	St Johnstone	51	(4)
1967–1972	Lossiemouth		

International career
1960	Scottish League XI	1	(0)

Managerial career
- Lossiemouth
- Rothes
- * Club domestic league appearances and goals

Jim Richmond (13 October 1932 – 2 November 2019) was a Scottish footballer who played for Hamilton Academical, Falkirk, Kilmarnock, St Johnstone, and Lossiemouth. While at Kilmarnock, Richmond played in the 1960 Scottish Cup Final, as well as the 1960 and 1962 Scottish League Cup Finals, and was voted the Kilmarnock Supporters Association's Player of the Year, in 1962. He also represented the Scottish Football League XI, in a victory over the League of Ireland. After moving to Highland League side Lossiemouth as a player, Richmond later became their manager and settled in the area for the rest of his life.
