= Pat O'Connor (Scottish footballer) =

Scottish footballer

Pat O'Connor born 9 December 1938, was a professional footballer for Kilmarnock Football Club.
