= Jim McFadzean =

Scottish footballer

Personal information
- Full name: James McFadzean
- Date of birth: 20 August 1938
- Place of birth: Kilmarnock, Scotland
- Date of death: 24 February 2016 (aged 77)
- Place of death: Kilmarnock, Scotland
- Position: Forward

Senior career*
Years	Team	Apps	(Gls)
1956–1960	Heart of Midlothian	25	(5)
1960–1961	St Mirren	7	(1)
1961–1963	Raith Rovers	26	(5)
1963–1969	Kilmarnock	128	(12)
1969–1973	Ayr United	49	(0)
- * Club domestic league appearances and goals

James McFadzean (20 August 1938 – 24 February 2016) was a Scottish footballer who played as a forward.

McFadzean is best known for his part in the 1964-65 title winning Kilmarnock squad while making 128 appearances for the Rugby Park club. He had earlier spells with Heart of Midlothian, St Mirren and Raith Rovers and later joined Ayr United where he ended his playing career.

McFadzean died on 24 February 2016 at the age of 77.
