= Eric Murray (footballer) =

Scottish footballer (1941–2016)

Personal information
- Full name: Eric McIntyre Murray
- Date of birth: 12 December 1941
- Place of birth: Symington, Scotland
- Date of death: 7 November 2016 (aged 74)
- Place of death: Kilmarnock, Scotland
- Position: Right half

Youth career
- –1960: Saxone Amateurs

Senior career*
Years	Team	Apps	(Gls)
1960–1968	Kilmarnock	145	(26)
1960–1961	→ Dreghorn Juniors (loan)		
1968–1971	St Mirren	40	(0)
- Cumnock Juniors
Total		185	(26)
- * Club domestic league appearances and goals

Eric McIntyre Murray (12 December 1941 – 7 November 2016) was a Scottish footballer who played for Kilmarnock and St Mirren as a wing half.

Murray was a regular part of the Kilmarnock side that won the Scottish league championship in 1964–65. Kilmarnock then played in the 1965–66 European Cup against Real Madrid; Murray was tasked with marking the Hungarian great Ferenc Puskás.
