= Willie Waddell =

Scottish footballer and manager

Personal information
- Full name: William Waddell
- Date of birth: 7 March 1921
- Place of birth: Forth, Lanarkshire, Scotland
- Date of death: 14 October 1992 (aged 71)
- Place of death: Glasgow, Scotland
- Position: Outside right

Youth career
- Forth Wanderers
- Strathclyde

Senior career*
Years	Team	Apps	(Gls)
1939–1955	Rangers	201	(39)

International career
1946–1954	Scotland	18	(6)
1947–1951	Scottish League XI	5	(1)

Managerial career
- 1957–1965: Kilmarnock
- 1969–1972: Rangers
- * Club domestic league appearances and goals

William Waddell (7 March 1921 – 14 October 1992) was a professional football player and manager. His only club in a 16-year career as a player in the outside right position (interrupted by World War II) was Rangers which yielded six major winner's medals, and he also played 18 times for Scotland.

Waddell also managed Rangers – leading them to their only continental trophy in the 1972 European Cup Winners' Cup Final – and served as a director of the Glasgow club, after a spell in charge of Kilmarnock which culminated in their only Scottish league title in 1964–65, followed by some years working as a sports journalist.

== Career ==
=== Playing career ===
Waddell was born in Forth, Lanarkshire. As a player, he only played professionally for Rangers in a career spanning both sides of World War II (and including over 200 unofficial matches during the conflict in addition to 317 recognised appearances).

He made his debut at the age of 17 in a friendly match against Arsenal and went on to win four League titles and two Scottish Cups as well as playing a large part in other successful cup runs without playing in the finals, and being a member of the Gers team which dominated the wartime competitions.

He also earned 18 caps for Scotland (scoring six times) between 1946 and 1954 after playing in eight unofficial wartime matches, and was selected for the Scottish League XI five times.

=== Managerial career ===
Waddell became manager of Kilmarnock in 1957. In what was their most prosperous era, the club achieved four runners-up placings in the league under his guidance between 1960 and 1964 and reached three finals (1959–60 Scottish Cup, 1961 League Cup, 1963 League Cup), all of which were lost.

Kilmarnock's efforts were finally rewarded with a trophy when the club won their only league championship to date, in 1964–65; this was achieved with a final day victory against their nearest rivals Heart of Midlothian. On leaving Kilmarnock in 1965 Waddell traded the football world for journalism, becoming a sportswriter for the Evening Citizen and Scottish Daily Express. He took charge of Kilmarnock in 389 competitive matches, winning 215 (55%), the club's best-ever ratio for a manager.

From the mid-1960s Scottish football was dominated by the Celtic side managed by Jock Stein. In 1969 Waddell returned to Rangers as manager, following the sacking of Davie White. The team did not win any League Championships with Waddell as manager, but won the Scottish League Cup in 1971, ending a run of six years without a trophy. In 1972 Waddell led Rangers to a European Cup Winners' Cup win, beating Dynamo Moscow 3–2 in the final in Barcelona. Later in 1972 he handed the management reins to his assistant, Jock Wallace, Jr. having been Rangers boss for 134 games.

== Later career ==
Waddell went on to serve Rangers in general manager and vice chairman roles. During Waddell's time as manager, Rangers had suffered the 1971 Ibrox disaster, when 66 fans lost their lives. Waddell was credited with the reconstruction of Ibrox Stadium in the late 1970s and early 1980s, which made it one of the most modern grounds in Europe at the time of his death. He became general manager in 1972, after leaving his role as first-team manager, and latterly took up the role of vice chairman in September 1975. After four years he resigned his position, to be replaced by Lawrence Marlborough, and took up the role of consultant at the club. However, he left this role on 27 June 1981, after Rangers decided not to renew his £15,000-a-year (equivalent to £52,000 in 2015) contract but remained a director of the club until his death.

== Career statistics ==
=== International appearances ===
Appearances and goals by national team and year
National team	Year	Apps	Goals
Scotland	1946	2	1
Scotland	1948	2	2
Scotland	1949	3	2
Scotland	1950	1	0
Scotland	1951	7	1
Scotland	1953	1	0
Scotland	1954	2	0
Total		18	6

=== International goals ===
Scores and results list Scotland's goal tally first.

#	Date	Venue	Opponent	Score	Result	Competition	Ref
1.	19 October 1946	Racecourse Ground, Wrexham	Wales	1–0	1–3	1946–47 British Home Championship	
2.	23 October 1948	Ninian Park, Cardiff	Wales	2–1	3–1	1948–49 British Home Championship	
3.	23 October 1948	Ninian Park, Cardiff	Wales	3–1	3–1	1948–49 British Home Championship	
4.	1 October 1949	Windsor Park, Belfast	Northern Ireland	2–0	8–2	1949–50 British Home Championship	
5.	1 October 1949	Windsor Park, Belfast	Northern Ireland	5–0	8–2	1949–50 British Home Championship	
6.	20 May 1951	Stade Heysel, Brussels	Belgium	5–0	5–0	Friendly	

=== Managerial record ===
As of 27 November 2013

Team	Nat	From	To	Record				
Team	Nat	From	To	G	W	D	L	Win %
Kilmarnock	(Scotland)	July 1957	June 1965	389	215	76	98	55.27
Rangers	(Scotland)	December 1969	May 1972	134	76	25	33	56.72

== Honours ==
=== Playing ===
Rangers

- Scottish League Championship: 1938–39, 1946–47, 1948–49, 1952–53
- Scottish Cup: 1948–49, 1952–53

=== Managerial ===
Kilmarnock

- Scottish League Championship: 1964–65

Rangers

- Scottish League Cup: 1970–71
- UEFA Cup Winners' Cup: 1971–72
