= 1964–65 Scottish Division One =

59th season of top-tier football league in Scotland

Scottish Division One
- Season: 1964–65
- Champions: Kilmarnock
- Relegated: Airdrieonians; Third Lanark

The 1964–65 Scottish Division One was won by Kilmarnock on goal average, ahead of Hearts. Airdrieonians and Third Lanark finished 17th and 18th respectively and were relegated to the 1965-66 Second Division.

In one of the closest finishes ever seen in a league competition in Britain, Hearts played Kilmarnock at Tynecastle on the last day of the season, holding a two-point lead over the Ayrshire club and a slightly better goal average. Kilmarnock had to beat Hearts by 2–0, or by a greater winning margin, to win the title. Any result better than a 2–0 defeat for Hearts, including other two-goal losing margins where Hearts scored six goals or more (e.g. 6-8) would have made Hearts champions. Realistically, Kilmarnock needed to win by two clear goals, which was the result they achieved by defeating Hearts 2–0 with first-half goals from Davie Sneddon and Brien McIlroy, giving them a goal average of 1.878 as against Hearts' 1.836. If goal difference had been the rule Hearts would have won the title. At the time, it was the only occasion that the championship was decided on the final day between the two challengers directly (in 1891 and 1905 a playoff took place when the top two finished level on points); the rare situation occurred again in 1991, and then in 2026.

To date, this was also the first and only time that neither of the Old Firm clubs finished in the top four of the top flight, and the fifth and last season (following 1897, 1903, 1904 and 1960, four also featuring Hearts) that neither Glasgow club finished in the top two. The situation reversed completely the following season, as Rangers and Celtic were the finalists in both cups and finished first and second in the league.

== League table ==
Pos	Team	Pld	W	D	L	GF	GA	GAv	Pts	Qualification or relegation
1	Kilmarnock	34	22	6	6	62	33	1.879	50	Champions
2	Hearts	34	22	6	6	90	49	1.837	50	
3	Dunfermline Athletic	34	22	5	7	83	36	2.306	49	
4	Hibernian	34	21	4	9	75	47	1.596	46	
5	Rangers	34	18	8	8	78	35	2.229	44	
6	Dundee	34	15	10	9	86	63	1.365	40	
7	Clyde	34	17	6	11	64	58	1.103	40	
8	Celtic	34	16	5	13	76	57	1.333	37	
9	Dundee United	34	15	6	13	59	51	1.157	36	
10	Morton	34	13	7	14	54	54	1.000	33	
11	Partick Thistle	34	11	10	13	57	58	0.983	32	
12	Aberdeen	34	12	8	14	59	75	0.787	32	
13	St Johnstone	34	9	11	14	57	62	0.919	29	
14	Motherwell	34	10	8	16	45	54	0.833	28	
15	St Mirren	34	9	6	19	38	70	0.543	24	
16	Falkirk	34	7	7	20	43	85	0.506	21	
17	Airdrieonians	34	5	4	25	48	110	0.436	14	Relegated to the 1965–66 Second Division
18	Third Lanark	34	3	1	30	22	99	0.222	7	Relegated to the 1965–66 Second Division

Source: RSSSF

== Results ==
Home \ Away	ABE	AIR	CEL	CLY	DND	DNU	DNF	FAL	HOM	HIB	KIL	MOR	MOT	PAR	RAN	STJ	STM	THI
Aberdeen		5–2	1–3	0–3	1–1	1–0	2–2	2–1	0–3	1–1	1–1	2–1	0–1	5–1	2–0	5–5	2–1	3–1
Airdrieonians	2–4		0–6	3–5	2–2	3–3	3–4	2–2	1–2	0–1	2–1	0–2	0–3	0–5	0–4	1–2	5–1	2–1
Celtic	8–0	2–1		1–1	0–2	1–1	1–2	3–0	1–2	2–4	2–0	1–0	2–0	1–2	3–1	0–1	4–1	1–0
Clyde	4–0	4–3	1–1		1–0	2–0	1–0	6–1	2–5	1–3	1–2	1–0	1–1	4–1	0–3	4–1	1–1	1–0
Dundee	3–1	4–0	3–3	1–2		2–4	3–1	3–2	1–2	2–1	1–3	1–1	4–2	3–3	4–1	4–4	2–1	6–1
Dundee United	0–3	3–2	3–1	6–0	1–4		2–0	4–1	1–1	0–1	0–1	3–2	3–1	1–2	1–3	4–1	2–0	4–1
Dunfermline Athletic	2–0	3–1	5–1	7–2	3–3	0–1		5–1	3–2	1–0	1–0	6–0	3–0	2–0	3–1	1–1	2–1	8–0
Falkirk	0–1	4–1	6–2	0–0	4–2	0–0	0–4		2–2	0–1	0–1	0–2	1–1	2–2	0–5	3–2	2–0	3–0
Heart of Midlothian	6–3	8–1	4–2	3–0	1–7	3–1	1–1	5–2		0–1	0–2	4–1	2–0	1–0	1–1	4–1	0–0	3–1
Hibernian	4–2	5–1	0–4	4–3	2–2	3–4	1–0	6–0	3–5		1–2	2–1	2–0	2–1	1–0	2–0	1–1	5–0
Kilmarnock	2–1	2–0	5–2	2–1	1–4	4–2	1–0	2–0	3–1	4–3		3–0	1–1	0–0	1–1	0–0	4–0	3–1
Morton	1–1	5–0	3–3	0–0	3–2	2–0	2–0	4–0	2–3	3–2	5–1		0–2	0–3	1–3	3–1	0–0	4–0
Motherwell	2–2	1–2	1–3	0–1	2–1	1–1	1–3	1–0	1–3	0–2	0–2	4–1		0–2	1–3	2–2	4–0	3–3
Partick Thistle	2–1	3–1	2–4	0–3	4–4	0–0	1–2	4–1	1–3	4–2	1–0	1–1	1–2		1–1	2–2	1–2	0–1
Rangers	2–2	9–2	1–0	6–1	4–0	0–1	0–0	6–1	1–1	2–4	1–1	0–1	1–0	1–1		2–1	1–0	5–0
St Johnstone	2–4	1–1	3–0	1–0	2–2	2–0	1–3	2–2	0–3	1–3	0–1	3–0	1–1	2–2	0–1		5–1	5–0
St Mirren	4–0	3–0	1–5	2–3	0–2	2–1	1–4	3–0	2–1	0–0	0–2	1–1	1–4	4–1	0–7	1–0		2–1
Third Lanark	4–1	0–4	0–3	0–4	0–1	1–2	1–2	1–2	1–5	0–2	0–4	1–2	0–2	0–3	0–1	0–2	2–1	

Legend: Blue = home team win; Yellow = draw; Red = away team win.

== Awards ==
Award	Winner	Club
SFWA Footballer of the Year	(Scotland) Billy McNeill	Celtic
