= 1965–66 Scottish Division One =

60th season of top-tier football league in Scotland

Scottish Division One
- Season: 1965–66
- Champions: Celtic
- Relegated: Morton; Hamilton Academical

The 1965–66 Scottish Division One was won by Celtic by two points over city rivals Rangers. Morton and Hamilton Academical finished 17th and 18th respectively and were relegated to the 1966-67 Second Division. It was Celtic's first championship since 1954. Having both finished outside the top four places for the first (and so far only) time, the Old Firm clubs not only returned to the top of the table but also contested both domestic cup finals, which had not occurred since the introduction of the Scottish League Cup in 1946.

== League table ==
Pos	Team	Pld	W	D	L	GF	GA	GD	Pts	Qualification
1	Celtic	34	27	3	4	106	30	+76	57	
2	Rangers	34	25	5	4	91	29	+62	55	
3	Kilmarnock	34	20	5	9	73	46	+27	45	
4	Dunfermline	34	19	6	9	94	55	+39	44	
5	Dundee United	34	19	5	10	79	51	+28	43	
6	Hibernian	34	16	6	12	81	55	+26	38	
7	Hearts	34	13	12	9	56	48	+8	38	
8	Aberdeen	34	15	6	13	61	54	+7	36	
9	Dundee	34	14	6	14	61	61	0	34	
10	Falkirk	34	15	1	18	48	72	−24	31	
11	Clyde	34	13	4	17	62	64	−2	30	
12	Partick Thistle	34	10	10	14	55	64	−9	30	
13	Motherwell	34	12	4	18	52	69	−17	28	
14	St Johnstone	34	9	8	17	58	81	−23	26	
15	Stirling Albion	34	9	8	17	40	68	−28	26	
16	St Mirren	34	9	4	21	44	82	−38	22	
17	Morton (R)	34	8	5	21	42	84	−42	21	Relegated to the Second Division
18	Hamilton Academical (R)	34	3	2	29	27	117	−90	8	Relegated to the Second Division

Source: RSSSF
(R) Relegated

== Results ==
Home \ Away	ABE	CEL	CLY	DND	DNU	DNF	FAL	HAM	HOM	HIB	KIL	MOR	MOT	PAR	RAN	STJ	STM	STI
Aberdeen		3–1	2–0	2–3	0–0	2–2	2–0	5–2	0–1	1–3	1–0	5–3	1–2	2–1	1–2	2–3	4–1	2–2
Celtic	7–1		2–1	5–0	1–0	2–1	6–0	5–0	5–2	2–0	2–1	8–1	1–0	1–1	5–1	3–2	5–0	6–1
Clyde	2–2	1–3		0–2	4–1	6–1	3–2	4–1	0–1	1–2	1–4	2–0	1–3	3–1	2–2	3–2	0–1	0–1
Dundee	1–2	1–2	1–4		0–5	0–2	2–0	2–1	1–0	4–3	0–2	5–1	4–0	1–1	1–1	3–1	3–2	6–2
Dundee United	3–0	0–4	0–2	2–1		0–4	2–3	7–0	2–2	5–4	0–0	4–2	5–1	5–2	1–0	5–1	3–0	1–1
Dunfermline Athletic	2–3	0–2	6–4	2–2	2–4		6–1	1–0	1–1	3–2	1–0	2–1	6–1	4–3	1–2	5–1	5–1	5–1
Falkirk	3–0	3–4	0–1	3–1	1–4	0–3		0–0	0–1	3–2	3–2	3–2	2–0	2–0	3–2	2–1	2–3	2–0
Hamilton Academical	0–4	1–7	1–4	1–2	0–4	1–6	1–4		0–1	1–2	1–4	1–2	1–4	4–3	1–7	1–1	1–0	3–1
Heart of Midlothian	1–1	3–2	4–1	0–0	0–1	0–0	1–2	2–0		0–4	2–3	2–1	5–2	3–1	0–2	0–0	4–0	1–1
Hibernian	0–1	0–0	3–1	1–1	3–3	1–1	5–1	11–1	2–3		3–3	4–1	2–2	2–0	1–2	3–0	3–2	1–0
Kilmarnock	1–3	0–2	1–2	5–3	1–0	1–0	1–0	3–1	2–2	1–0		4–0	5–0	2–1	1–1	3–1	3–1	2–1
Morton	1–3	0–2	1–1	2–2	2–0	1–1	0–1	3–0	0–3	1–5	1–4		3–1	0–0	0–5	1–2	0–0	2–1
Motherwell	1–0	0–1	0–1	2–0	0–3	1–3	3–0	4–2	4–2	4–0	0–3	3–0		0–3	0–3	5–3	4–1	0–1
Partick Thistle	0–3	2–2	2–1	2–0	4–1	2–6	3–0	1–0	3–3	3–2	1–0	1–2	1–1		1–1	3–1	4–1	1–1
Rangers	1–0	2–1	4–0	1–0	2–0	2–3	3–0	4–0	1–1	2–0	5–0	3–1	2–1	4–0		3–2	4–1	6–0
St Johnstone	2–2	1–4	3–3	1–0	1–2	1–5	2–1	5–0	3–2	1–3	1–1	4–2	3–3	2–2	0–3		3–2	1–1
St Mirren	1–0	0–3	2–1	2–5	1–2	4–3	6–0	1–0	1–1	0–2	4–7	0–1	0–0	2–0	1–6	2–3		0–0
Stirling Albion	2–1	1–0	3–2	1–4	2–4	2–1	0–1	3–0	2–2	1–2	2–3	2–4	1–0	2–2	0–2	1–0	0–1	

Legend: Blue = home team win; Yellow = draw; Red = away team win.

== Awards ==
Award	Winner	Club
SFWA Footballer of the Year	(Scotland) John Greig	Rangers

== See also ==
- Nine in a row
