= Tommy McLean =

Scottish footballer and manager

Personal information
- Date of birth: 2 June 1947 (age 79)
- Place of birth: Ashgill, Scotland
- Position: Midfielder

Senior career*
Years	Team	Apps	(Gls)
1964–1971	Kilmarnock	216	(48)
1971–1982	Rangers	300	(35)
Total		516	(83)

International career
1967–1971	Scotland	9	(1)
1966–1973	Scottish League XI	7	(0)

Managerial career
- 1983–1984: Morton
- 1984–1994: Motherwell
- 1994–1995: Heart of Midlothian
- 1996: Raith Rovers
- 1996–1998: Dundee United
Medal record
Scotland
UEFA European U-18 Championship
Bronze medal – third place	1963 England	Team Competition
- * Club domestic league appearances and goals

Thomas McLean Jr. (born 2 June 1947) is a Scottish former professional football player and manager. McLean played for Kilmarnock, Rangers and Scotland as a midfielder. He managed Morton, Motherwell, Hearts, Raith Rovers and Dundee United.

== Early life ==
McLean was born and grew up in Ashgill, Lanarkshire, along with his elder brothers Jim and Willie, who would also become successful players and managers.

== Playing career ==
A traditional tricky winger, McLean started his career at Kilmarnock, where at one point all three brothers were at the club together, Jim and Tommy as players and Willie as a coach. He was part of the Kilmarnock team which won the club's only league title, in 1964-65.

He joined Rangers in 1971 for £65,000 and was involved in the clubs famous 1972 Cup Winners Cup triumph. He went on to play 452 times for Rangers, winning three League championships, four Scottish Cups and three Scottish League Cups.

McLean made nine appearances for Scotland, all of them during his time with Kilmarnock. Three of those games were during a 1967 overseas tour that the Scottish Football Association decided in October 2021 to reclassify as full internationals, which increased McLean's cap tally from six to nine. He also represented the Scottish League XI seven times.

He was selected for the Scotland under-18s at the 1963 UEFA under-18 Euros in England.

In October 2016 he was inducted into the Kilmarnock 'Hall of Fame' alongside other well-known former players such as James Fowler, Ray Montgomerie and Stuart McLean (no relation).

== Managerial career ==
After his playing career he became Rangers' assistant manager. Thereafter he had spells in management with Morton, Motherwell, Hearts, Raith Rovers and Dundee United, before becoming Under-19 coach at Rangers.

McLean managed Motherwell for ten years, during which the club won the Scottish Cup in 1991. Motherwell defeated Dundee United, who were managed by his brother Jim, in the cup final to enter Europe for the first time in their history. They also challenged for the 1993–94 Scottish Premier Division title, eventually finishing third.

His spell at Raith Rovers in 1996 was remarkable for lasting only six days and encompassing only one game; the lure of working under Jim, by then chairman of Dundee United, saw him quit Stark's Park for Tannadice amidst substantial acrimony.

McLean returned to Rangers in May 2001 as director of youth development, after he had held a similar post at Dundee United since October 2000.

On 4 November 2021, it was announced that McLean was to be inducted into the Motherwell F.C. Hall of Fame. A week later, following consultations with supporter groups, the south stand at Fir Park was renamed in his honour.

Tommy is married to wife Beth. Their daughter Lorna was born in 1991.

== Honours ==
=== Player ===
Kilmarnock

- Scottish league champions: 1964–65

Rangers

- Scottish league champions: 1974–75, 1975–76, 1977–78
- Scottish Cup: 1972–73, 1975–76, 1977–78, 1978–79
- Scottish League Cup: 1975–76, 1977–78, 1978–79
- European Cup Winners' Cup: 1971–72

=== Manager ===
Morton

- Scottish First Division: 1983–84

Motherwell

- Scottish Cup: 1990–91
- Scottish First Division: 1984–85

=== Individual ===
- Scottish Football Hall of Fame inductee: 2019
- Motherwell Hall of Fame: 2022
