= Matt Watson (footballer, born 1936) =

Scottish footballer

Matthew McCluskie Watson (3 May 1936 – 25 October 2015) was a Scottish footballer who played as a full-back and is best known for his time with Kilmarnock where he made 440 appearances for the Rugby Park club from 1955 to 1968.

Watson was part of the 1964–65 Kilmarnock title winning side and also played on the losing sides of the 1960 Scottish Cup final and the 1960/61 and 1962/63 League Cup Finals. He later played for Queen of the South.

Watson died on 25 October 2015 at the age of 79.
