= Davie Sneddon =

Scottish footballer and manager (1936–2020)

Davie Sneddon MBE
Personal information
- Full name: David Sneddon
- Date of birth: 24 April 1936
- Place of birth: Kilwinning, Scotland
- Date of death: 24 December 2020 (aged 84)
- Position: Inside forward

Youth career
- Kilwinning Rangers

Senior career*
Years	Team	Apps	(Gls)
1954–1959	Dundee	60	(13)
1959–1962	Preston North End	91	(17)
1962–1967	Kilmarnock	113	(16)
1967–1971	Raith Rovers	91	(9)
- Hurlford United
Total		355	(55)

International career
1958	Scotland U23	1	(0)

Managerial career
- 1977–1981: Kilmarnock
- 1982–1985: Stranraer
- * Club domestic league appearances and goals

David Sneddon MBE (24 April 1936 – 24 December 2020) was a Scottish football player and manager. His career is notable for managing Kilmarnock to their 1979 Tennent Caledonian Cup victory and also being part of the 1964–65 Scottish First Division winning Kilmarnock side. Sneddon was capped once by the Scotland national under-23 football team.

He was appointed a Member of the Order of the British Empire (MBE) in the 2014 Birthday Honours "for services to Kilmarnock Football Club and the community in Kilmarnock, Ayrshire." Sneddon died on 24 December 2020 at the age of 84.
