= Bertie Black =

Scottish footballer

Personal information
- Full name: Robert Black
- Date of birth: 2 December 1934
- Place of birth: Lugar, Scotland
- Date of death: 24 April 1984 (aged 49)
- Place of death: Cumnock, Scotland
- Position: Inside forward

Youth career
- Lugar Boswell Thistle

Senior career*
Years	Team	Apps	(Gls)
1952–1966	Kilmarnock	233	(86)
1966–1968	Ayr United	61	(11)
- Corby Town
Total		294	(97)

International career
1958–1961	Scottish Football League XI	3	(0)
- * Club domestic league appearances and goals

Robert Black (2 December 1934 – 24 April 1984) was a Scottish professional footballer who played as an inside forward for Lugar Boswell Thistle, Kilmarnock, Ayr United and Corby Town.
