= Jackie McInally =

Scottish footballer

Personal information
- Date of birth: 21 November 1936
- Place of birth: Ayr, Scotland
- Date of death: 8 July 2016 (aged 79)
- Place of death: Ayr, Scotland
- Position: Inside forward

Senior career*
Years	Team	Apps	(Gls)
- Kello Rovers
- Minishant Amateurs
- Crosshill Thistle
1959–1968	Kilmarnock	212	(86)
1968–1973	Motherwell	134	(37)
1973–1975	Hamilton Academical	66	(21)
Total		412	(144)

International career
1961	SFL trial v SFA	1	(0)
- * Club domestic league appearances and goals

Jackie McInally (21 November 1936 – 8 July 2016) was a Scottish professional footballer who played as an inside forward.

== Early life ==
McInally was born in Ayr. Prior to his football career he undertook a plumbing apprenticeship, and he spent two years in the Royal Scots Greys as part of his National Service.

== Career ==
McInally spent his early career in amateur football with Kello Rovers, Minishant Amateurs, and Crosshill Thistle. He then played in the Scottish Football League with Kilmarnock, Motherwell and Hamilton Academical, making over 400 appearances.

He won the Scottish Amateur Cup with Crosshill Thistle in 1959, First Division with Kilmarnock in 1965, and the Second Division with Motherwell in 1969.

He also made one appearance for a Scottish League XI, in an exhibition match against a 'Scotland XI' in January 1961.

== Later and personal life ==
After retiring as a footballer McInally ran a number of shops, worked in a fork lift factory, and managed a paint wholesaler. His son Alan was also a professional footballer.
