= 1998–99 Kilmarnock F.C. season =

Kilmarnock
1998–99 season
- Manager: Bobby Williamson
- Stadium: Rugby Park
- Scottish Premier League: Fourth place
- Scottish Cup: Third round
- Scottish League Cup: Quarter-final
- UEFA Cup: Second Qualifying Round
- Top goalscorer: League: Ally McCoist (7); All: Ally McCoist & Paul Wright (8)
- Highest home attendance: 17,608 v Rangers, Premier League, 22 August 1998
- Lowest home attendance: 6,565 v Livingston, League Cup, 18 August 1998
- Average home league attendance: 11,736
Home colours	Away colours

The 1998–99 season was Kilmarnock's first season in the newly formed Scottish Premier League. They also competed in the Scottish Cup, Scottish League Cup and UEFA Cup.

== Summary ==
=== Season ===
Kilmarnock finished fourth in the Scottish Premier League with 56 points. They reached the fourth round of the League Cup, losing to Airdrieonians. Kilmarnock also reached the third round of the Scottish Cup, losing to rivals Ayr United and lost in the second qualifying round of the UEFA Cup to Sigma Olomouc.

== Results and fixtures ==
Kilmarnock's score comes first

Win Draw Loss Postponed

=== Friendlies ===
Match	Date	Opponent	Venue	Result	Attendance	Scorers
Ray Montgomerie Testimonial	18 July 1998	Celtic	H	1–2	6,860	Wright 19'

=== Scottish Premier League ===
Match	Date	Opponent	Venue	Result	Attendance	Scorers
1	1 August 1998	Dundee United	H	2–0	8,208	Wright 32', Nevin 72'
2	15 August 1998	St Johnstone	A	0–0	6,210	
3	22 August 1998	Rangers	H	1–3	17,608	Wright 52'
4	30 August 1998	Heart of Midlothian	H	3–0	10,376	McCoist 8', 61', 86'
5	12 September 1998	Celtic	A	1–1	58,361	Vareille 50'
6	19 September 1998	Motherwell	A	0–0	6,821	
7	23 September 1998	Dundee	H	2–1	7,069	McCoist 21', McGowne 89'
8	27 September 1998	Aberdeen	A	1–0	13,048	Wright 14'
9	3 October 1998	Dunfermline Athletic	H	0–0	8,346	
10	17 October 1998	Dundee United	A	2–0	8,317	McGowne 12', Vareille 80'
11	24 October 1998	St Johnstone	H	2–2	9,336	Roberts 78', Kernaghan 83' (o.g.)
12	31 October 1998	Celtic	H	2–0	16,695	Roberts 55', Mitchell 70'
13	7 November 1998	Heart of Midlothian	A	1–2	14,363	Wright 87'
14	14 November 1998	Dundee	A	1–1	4,249	Vareille 45'
15	21 November 1998	Motherwell	H	0–0	10,176	
16	28 November 1998	Dunfermline Athletic	A	3–0	5,608	Durrant 32', 56', Holt 77'
17	5 December 1998	Aberdeen	H	4–0	9,875	Mitchell 6', 34', Vareille 38', Wright 66'
18	12 December 1998	Rangers	A	0–1	49,781	
19	20 December 1998	Dundee United	H	2–0	13,585	Wright 30', Durrant 87'
20	26 December 1998	Heart of Midlothian	H	1–0	10,668	Holt 27'
21	1 January 1999	Motherwell	A	2–1	8,532	McCoist 15', McGowne 86'
22	30 January 1999	Dundee	H	0–0	7,677	
23	6 February 1999	Aberdeen	A	1–2	9,299	Mahood 66'
24	17 February 1999	Celtic	A	0–1	59,126	
25	28 February 1999	Rangers	H	0–5	16,242	
26	6 March 1999	Dunfermline Athletic	H	0–0	8,032	
27	13 March 1999	St Johnstone	A	1–0	5,461	Holt 18'
28	21 March 1999	Celtic	H	0–0	14,472	
29	3 April 1999	Heart of Midlothian	A	2–2	14,689	Henry 73', McCoist 77'
30	10 April 1999	Aberdeen	H	4–2	9,048	Mahood 9', MacPherson 19', McCutcheon 86', 90'
31	17 April 1999	Dunfermline Athletic	A	6–0	5,617	Henry 26', 75', Mitchell 56', Durrant 58', Vareille 68', McCoist 90'
32	24 April 1999	Dundee	A	1–2	4,296	Innes 53'
33	1 May 1999	Motherwell	H	0–1	8,867	
34	8 May 1999	Dundee United	A	0–0	7,190	
35	15 May 1999	St Johnstone	H	1–1	15,086	Roberts 8'
36	23 May 1999	Rangers	A	1–1	48,886	McGowne 41'

=== Scottish League Cup ===
Match	Date	Opponent	Venue	Result	Attendance	Scorers
Third Round	18 August 1998	Livingston	H	3–1	6,565	Wright 25, 116', McCoist 92'
Quarter-final	8 September 1998	Airdrieonians	H	0–1	7,900	

=== Scottish Cup ===
Match	Date	Opponent	Venue	Result	Attendance	Scorers
Third Round	23 January 1999	Ayr United	A	0–3	10,153	

=== UEFA Cup ===
Match	Date	Opponent	Venue	Result	Attendance	Scorers
First Qualifying Round 1st leg	22 July 1998	(Bosnia and Herzegovina) Željezničar	A	1–1	15,000	McGowne 55'
First Qualifying Round 2nd leg	29 July 1998	(Bosnia and Herzegovina) Željezničar	H	1–0	14,512	Mahood 31'
Second Qualifying Round 1st leg	11 August 1998	(Czech Republic) Sigma Olomouc	A	0–2	4,000	
Second Qualifying Round 2nd leg	25 August 1998	(Czech Republic) Sigma Olomouc	H	0–2	11,140	

== Squad statistics ==
As of 23 May 1999 (UTC)

No.	Pos	Nat	Player	Total		Premier League		League Cup		Scottish Cup		UEFA Cup	
No.	Pos	Nat	Player	Apps	Goals	Apps	Goals	Apps	Goals	Apps	Goals	Apps	Goals
1	GK	(Scotland) SCO	Gordon Marshall	43	0	36+0	0	2+0	0	1+0	0	4+0	0
2	DF	(Scotland) SCO	Gus McPherson	38	1	31+0	1	2+0	0	1+0	0	4+0	0
3	DF	(Malta) MLT	Dylan Kerr	19	0	16+0	0	2+0	0	0+0	0	1+0	0
4	DF	(Scotland) SCO	Ray Montgomerie	32	2	27+0	2	3+0	0	1+0	0	1+0	0
5	DF	(Scotland) SCO	Kevin McGowne	39	5	32+0	4	2+0	0	1+0	0	4+0	1
6	MF	(Scotland) SCO	John Henry	11	3	7+4	3	0+0	0	0+0	0	0+0	0
7	MF	(Scotland) SCO	Pat Nevin	5	1	2+1	1	0+0	0	1+0	0	1+0	0
7	MF	(Scotland) SCO	Mark Reilly	19	0	17+1	0	0+0	0	1+0	0	0+0	0
8	MF	(Scotland) SCO	Gary Holt	40	3	33+0	3	2+0	0	1+0	0	4+0	0
9	FW	(Scotland) SCO	Paul Wright	39	8	25+8	6	2+0	2	0+0	0	4+0	0
10	MF	(Scotland) SCO	Ian Durrant	43	4	36+0	4	2+0	0	1+0	0	4+0	0
11	MF	(Scotland) SCO	Ally Mitchell	39	4	27+6	4	1+1	0	1+0	0	3+0	0
12	GK	(Scotland) SCO	Colin Meldrum	0	0	0+0	0	0+0	0	0+0	0	0+0	0
13	FW	(Scotland) SCO	Ally McCoist	29	8	16+10	7	1+1	1	1+0	0	0+0	0
14	MF	(Scotland) SCO	Alan Mahood	35	3	16+12	2	2+0	0	0+1	0	3+1	1
15	FW	(France) FRA	Jérôme Vareille	27	5	20+3	5	1+1	0	0+0	0	1+1	0
16	DF	(Scotland) SCO	Martin Baker	27	0	23+0	0	0+0	0	1+0	0	3+0	0
17	DF	(Scotland) SCO	Steven Hamilton	5	0	5+0	0	0+0	0	0+0	0	0+0	0
18	MF	(Scotland) SCO	Martin O'Neill	0	0	0+0	0	0+0	0	0+0	0	0+0	0
19	FW	(Scotland) SCO	Mark Roberts	27	3	9+13	3	0+1	0	1+0	0	0+3	0
20	MF	(Scotland) SCO	Alan Kerr	0	0	0+0	0	0+0	0	0+0	0	0+0	0
21	DF	(Scotland) SCO	Chris Innes	4	1	4+0	1	0+0	0	0+0	0	0+0	0
22	DF	(Scotland) SCO	Jim Lauchlan	19	0	14+0	0	0+0	0	1+0	0	4+0	0
23	MF	(Scotland) SCO	David Bagan	5	0	1+4	0	0+0	0	0+0	0	0+0	0
24	DF	(Scotland) SCO	Garry Hay	0	0	0+0	0	0+0	0	0+0	0	0+0	0
25	FW	(Scotland) SCO	Alex Burke	21	0	2+15	0	0+1	0	0+0	0	2+1	0
26	FW	(Scotland) SCO	Rod Lennox	0	0	0+0	0	0+0	0	0+0	0	0+0	0
27	FW	(Scotland) SCO	Gary McCutcheon	13	2	2+10	2	0+0	0	0+0	0	0+1	0
28	MF	(Scotland) SCO	Stuart Davidson	0	0	0+0	0	0+0	0	0+0	0	0+0	0
29	GK	(Scotland) SCO	Adam Strain	0	0	0+0	0	0+0	0	0+0	0	0+0	0

== Competitions ==
=== League table ===
Pos	Team	Pld	W	D	L	GF	GA	GD	Pts	Qualification or relegation
2	Celtic	36	21	8	7	84	35	+49	71	Qualification for the UEFA Cup qualifying round (Note: Since Rangers, the winners of the 1998–99 Scottish Cup, already qualified for the UEFA Champions League, Celtic, the losing finalist, earned a spot in the 1999–2000 UEFA Cup. As such, the league's UEFA Cup place moved down to third-placed St Johnstone. Scotland were also awarded an additional UEFA Cup place as the association was top of the UEFA Fair Play ranking. Kilmarnock earned this place as winners of the Scottish Fair Play ranking.)
3	St Johnstone	36	15	12	9	39	38	+1	57	Qualification for the UEFA Cup qualifying round
4	Kilmarnock	36	14	14	8	47	29	+18	56	Qualification for the UEFA Cup qualifying round
5	Dundee	36	13	7	16	36	56	−20	46	
6	Heart of Midlothian	36	11	9	16	44	50	−6	42	

Updated to match(es) played on end of season. Source: Soccerway and SPL official website
Rules for classification: 1) Points; 2) Goal difference; 3) Goals scored

=== Division summary ===
Round	1	2	3	4	5	6	7	8	9	10	11	12	13	14	15	16	17	18	19	20	21	22	23	24	25	26	27	28	29	30	31	32	33	34	35	36
Ground	H	A	H	H	A	A	H	A	H	A	H	H	A	A	H	A	H	A	H	H	A	H	A	A	H	H	A	H	A	H	A	A	H	A	H	A
Result	W	D	L	W	D	D	W	W	D	W	D	W	L	D	D	W	W	L	W	W	W	D	L	L	L	D	W	D	D	W	W	L	L	D	D	D
Position	3	2	5	3	3	3	2	2	2	2	2	2	2	2	2	2	2	2	2	2	2	2	2	3	3	3	3	3	3	3	3	3	3	3	3	4

A = Away; H = Home; W = Win; D = Draw; L = Loss

== Transfers ==
=== Players in ===
Player	Previous Club	Fee
(Scotland) Chris Innes	(Scotland) Stenhousemuir	Undisclosed
(Scotland) Ian Durrant	(Scotland) Rangers	Free
(Scotland) Alan Mahood	(Scotland) Greenock Morton	Undisclosed
(Scotland) Ally McCoist	(Scotland) Rangers	Free
(Scotland) Mark Reilly	(England) Reading	Free

=== Players out ===
Player	Previous Club	Fee
(England) Neil Whitworth	(England) Hull City	Free
(Scotland) Mark Skilling	(Scotland) Stranraer	Free
(Scotland) Pat Nevin	(Scotland) Motherwell	Free
(Scotland) Billy Findlay	(Scotland) Ayr United	Free
(Scotland) Colin Meldrum	(Scotland) Stranraer	Loan
(Scotland) John Henry	(Scotland) Falkirk	Loan
(Scotland) Chris Innes	(Scotland) St. Mirren	Loan
(Scotland) Martin O’Neill	(Scotland) Stranraer	Loan
(Scotland) Colin Meldrum	(Scotland) Ross County	Loan
