= 1999–2000 Kilmarnock F.C. season =

Kilmarnock
1999–2000 season
- Manager: Bobby Williamson
- Stadium: Rugby Park
- SPL: Ninth Place
- Scottish Cup: Third round
- League Cup: Semi-final
- UEFA Cup: First round
- Top goalscorer: League: Christophe Cocard (8); All: Christophe Cocard (8)
- Highest home attendance: 15,795 v Rangers, SPL, 16 October 1999
- Lowest home attendance: 6,002 v St Johnstone, SPL, 18 December 1999
- Average home league attendance: 9,419
Home colours	Away colours

The 1999–2000 season was Kilmarnock's second season in the Scottish Premier League. Kilmarnock also competed in the Scottish Cup, Scottish League Cup and the UEFA Cup.

== Summary ==
=== Season ===
Kilmarnock finished ninth in the Scottish Premier League with 37 points. They reached the semi–final of the League Cup, losing to Celtic. Kilmarnock also reached the third round of the Scottish Cup, losing to Alloa Athletic and lost in the first round of the UEFA Cup to 1. FC Kaiserslautern.

== Results and fixtures ==
Kilmarnock's score comes first

Win Draw Loss Postponed

=== Scottish Premier League ===
Match	Date	Opponent	Venue	Result	Attendance	Scorers
1	31 July 1999	Rangers	A	1–2	48,074	Mitchell 65'
2	7 August 1999	Aberdeen	H	2–0	8,378	Hay 38', 62'
3	15 August 1999	St Johnstone	A	0–2	4,681	
4	21 August 1999	Motherwell	H	0–1	7,732	
5	29 August 1999	Dundee United	A	0–0	6,621	
6	12 September 1999	Celtic	H	0–1	14,328	
7	19 September 1999	Hibernian	A	3–0	11,337	Reilly 12', Jeffrey 80', McCoist 90'
8	25 September 1999	Dundee	H	0–2	7,433	
9	16 October 1999	Rangers	H	1–1	15,795	Jeffrey 73'
10	23 October 1999	Aberdeen	A	2–2	10,352	Cocard 50', Mitchell 86'
11	27 October 1999	Heart of Midlothian	A	2–2	12,254	MacPherson 64', Cocard 50'
12	30 October 1999	Celtic	A	1–5	59,720	Cocard 36'
13	6 November 1999	Hibernian	H	0–2	8,735	
14	20 November 1999	Dundee United	H	1–1	7,012	Cocard 49'
15	27 November 1999	Heart of Midlothian	H	2–2	8,326	Mahood 73', Reilly 90'
16	11 December 1999	Rangers	A	0–1	47,169	
17	18 December 1999	St Johnstone	H	1–2	6,002	Wright 49'
18	27 December 1999	Hibernian	A	2–2	12,408	Smith 16', Cocard 22'
19	23 January 2000	Celtic	H	1–1	14,126	Reilly 40'
20	26 January 2000	Dundee	A	0–0	4,036	
21	12 February 2000	Motherwell	H	0–2	7,057	
22	22 February 2000	Motherwell	A	4–0	5,813	Cocard 28', 42', Vareille 85', 90'
23	26 February 2000	Heart of Midlothian	A	0–0	14,243	
24	4 March 2000	Dundee	H	2–2	8,460	Durrant 10', Dindeleux 56'
25	15 March 2000	Dundee United	A	2–2	6,996	Durrant 45', 48'
26	18 March 2000	St Johnstone	A	0–0	4,688	
27	25 March 2000	Hibernian	H	1–0	8,068	Vareille 52'
28	2 April 2000	Celtic	A	2–4	40,569	Wright 49', Lauchlan 57'
29	2 April 2000	Dundee United	H	1–0	6,037	McQuillan 80' (o.g.)
30	12 April 2000	Aberdeen	H	1–0	11,525	Wright 24'
31	16 April 2000	Motherwell	A	0–2	5,429	
32	22 April 2000	Dundee	A	2–1	6,208	Wright 35', 75'
33	29 April 2000	Heart of Midlothian	H	0–1	8,057	
34	7 May 2000	Rangers	H	0–2	13,284	
35	14 May 2000	Aberdeen	A	1–5	10,704	Lauchlan 25'
36	21 May 2000	St Johnstone	H	3–2	9,192	Durrant 10', Smith 50', Cocard 67'

=== Scottish League Cup ===
Match	Date	Opponent	Venue	Result	Attendance	Scorers
Third Round	12 October 1999	Hibernian	H	3–2	6,837	McCoist 19', 25', Vareille 68'
Quarter–Final	2 February 2000	Heart of Midlothian	H	1–0	6,648	Jeffrey 77'
Semi–Final	16 February 2000	Celtic	N	0–1	22,926	

=== Scottish Cup ===
Match	Date	Opponent	Venue	Result	Attendance	Scorers
Third Round	5 February 2000	Alloa Athletic	H	0–0	5,584	
Third Round Replay	9 February 2000	Alloa Athletic	A	0–1	1,894	

=== UEFA Cup ===
Match	Date	Opponent	Venue	Result	Attendance	Scorers
Qualifying Round 1st leg	12 August 1999	(Iceland) KR Reykjavík	A	0–1	5,000	
Qualifying Round 2nd leg	26 August 1999	(Iceland) KR Reykjavík	H	2–0	11,760	Wright 90', Bagan 92'
First Round 1st leg	16 September 1999	(Germany) Kaiserslautern	A	0–3	21,000	
First Round 2nd leg	30 September 1999	(Germany) Kaiserslautern	H	0–2	10,000	

== Player statistics ==
As of 21 May 2000 (UTC)

No.	Pos	Nat	Player	Total		Premier League		League Cup		Scottish Cup		UEFA Cup	
No.	Pos	Nat	Player	Apps	Goals	Apps	Goals	Apps	Goals	Apps	Goals	Apps	Goals
1	GK	(Scotland) SCO	Gordon Marshall	14	0	14+0	0	0+0	0	0+0	0	0+0	0
2	DF	(Scotland) SCO	Gus McPherson	39	1	30+0	1	3+0	0	2+0	0	4+0	0
3	DF	(Malta) MLT	Dylan Kerr	0	0	0+0	0	0+0	0	0+0	0	0+0	0
4	FW	(England) ENG	Michael Jeffrey	26	3	10+8	2	1+2	1	1+0	0	1+3	0
5	DF	(Scotland) SCO	Kevin McGowne	13	0	9+0	0	0+0	0	1+0	0	3+0	0
6	MF	(Scotland) SCO	John Henry	2	0	1+0	0	0+0	0	0+0	0	1+0	0
6	MF	(France) FRA	Christophe Cocard	28	8	24+1	8	1+1	0	1+0	0	0+0	0
7	MF	(Scotland) SCO	Mark Reilly	37	3	28+1	3	3+0	0	2+0	0	2+1	0
8	MF	(Scotland) SCO	Gary Holt	44	0	35+0	0	3+0	0	2+0	0	4+0	0
9	FW	(Scotland) SCO	Paul Wright	18	6	12+4	5	0+0	0	0+0	0	1+1	1
10	MF	(Scotland) SCO	Ian Durrant	40	4	32+0	4	3+0	0	1+1	0	3+0	0
11	MF	(Scotland) SCO	Ally Mitchell	32	2	22+4	2	2+0	0	1+0	0	2+1	0
12	GK	(Scotland) SCO	Colin Meldrum	27	0	18+0	0	3+0	0	2+0	0	4+0	0
13	FW	(Scotland) SCO	Ally McCoist	12	3	5+4	1	1+0	2	0+0	0	2+0	0
14	MF	(Scotland) SCO	Alan Mahood	21	1	6+11	1	1+1	0	0+0	0	2+0	0
15	FW	(France) FRA	Jérôme Vareille	30	4	13+10	3	2+0	1	1+0	0	2+2	0
16	DF	(Scotland) SCO	Martin Baker	18	0	11+0	0	2+0	0	2+0	0	3+0	0
17	DF	(France) FRA	Frédéric Dindeleux	36	1	28+0	1	3+0	0	2+0	0	3+0	0
18	DF	(England) ENG	Sean Hessey	11	0	7+4	0	0+0	0	0+0	0	0+0	0
19	FW	(Scotland) SCO	Mark Roberts	3	0	2+0	0	0+0	0	0+0	0	1+0	0
20	GK	(Scotland) SCO	Michael Watt	4	0	4+0	0	0+0	0	0+0	0	0+0	0
20	FW	(France) FRA	Samassi Abou	10	0	5+5	0	0+0	0	0+0	0	0+0	0
21	DF	(Scotland) SCO	Chris Innes	7	0	5+0	0	0+0	0	0+0	0	2+0	0
22	DF	(Scotland) SCO	Jim Lauchlan	35	2	29+0	2	2+0	0	2+0	0	2+0	0
23	MF	(Scotland) SCO	David Bagan	9	1	2+1	0	0+2	0	0+2	0	1+1	1
24	DF	(Scotland) SCO	Garry Hay	11	2	8+2	2	0+0	0	0+0	0	1+0	0
25	FW	(Scotland) SCO	Alex Burke	14	0	3+6	0	0+2	0	2+0	0	0+1	0
26	MF	(Scotland) SCO	James Fowler	5	0	1+4	0	0+0	0	0+0	0	0+0	0
27	FW	(Scotland) SCO	Gary McCutcheon	3	0	0+2	0	1+0	0	0+0	0	0+0	0
26	MF	(Scotland) SCO	Stuart Davidson	2	0	0+2	0	0+0	0	0+0	0	0+0	0
29	GK	(Scotland) SCO	Colin Stewart	0	0	0+0	0	0+0	0	0+0	0	0+0	0
30	FW	(Scotland) SCO	Paul Di Giacomo	0	0	0+0	0	0+0	0	0+0	0	0+0	0
31	DF	(Scotland) SCO	Peter Canero	11	0	6+5	0	0+0	0	0+0	0	0+0	0
32	DF	(England) ENG	Darren Beesley	2	0	1+1	0	0+0	0	0+0	0	0+0	0
33	FW	(Scotland) SCO	Andy Smith	17	2	11+4	2	0+0	0	1+1	0	0+0	0
34	DF	(Scotland) SCO	Tosh McKinlay	16	0	14+1	0	1+0	0	0+0	0	0+0	0

== Final league table ==
Pos	Team	Pld	W	D	L	GF	GA	GD	Pts	Qualification or relegation
6	Hibernian	36	10	11	15	49	61	−12	41	
7	Dundee	36	12	5	19	45	64	−19	41	
8	Dundee United	36	11	6	19	34	57	−23	39	
9	Kilmarnock	36	8	13	15	38	52	−14	37	
10	Aberdeen	36	9	6	21	44	83	−39	33	Qualification for the UEFA Cup qualifying round (Note: Since Rangers, the winners of the 1999–2000 Scottish Cup, already qualified for the UEFA Champions League, Aberdeen, the losing finalist, earned a spot in the 2000–01 UEFA Cup. As the bottom team, Aberdeen were also due to take part in a three-team play-off with Dunfermline Athletic and Falkirk, but as Falkirk's stadium did not meet SPL criteria, the play-off did not take place.)

Updated to match(es) played on end of season. Source: Scottish Professional Football League
Rules for classification: 1) Points; 2) Goal difference; 3) Goals scored

=== Division summary ===
Round	1	2	3	4	5	6	7	8	9	10	11	12	13	14	15	16	17	18	19	20	21	22	23	24	25	26	27	28	29	30	31	32	33	34	35	36
Ground	A	H	A	H	A	H	A	H	H	A	A	A	H	H	H	A	H	A	H	A	H	A	A	H	A	A	H	A	H	H	A	A	H	H	A	H
Result	L	W	L	L	D	L	W	L	D	D	D	L	L	D	D	L	L	D	D	D	L	W	D	D	D	D	W	L	W	W	L	W	L	L	L	W
Position	8	5	7	9	9	9	7	8	8	7	8	9	9	9	9	9	9	9	9	9	9	9	9	10	10	9	9	9	9	9	9	9	9	9	9	9

Updated to match(es) played on 18 April 2020. Source:
A = Away; H = Home; W = Win; D = Draw; L = Loss

== Transfers ==
=== Players in ===
Player	From	Fee
(England) Michael Jeffrey	(Netherlands) Fortuna Sittard	Free
(England) Sean Hessey	(England) Huddersfield Town	Free
(France) Frédéric Dindeleux	(France) Lille	Free
(Scotland) Michael Watt	(England) Norwich City	Free
(France) Christophe Cocard	(France) Lyon	Free
(Scotland) Tosh McKinlay	(Switzerland) Grasshopper	Free
(Scotland) Andy Smith	(Scotland) Dunfermline Athletic	Undisclosed
(France) Samassi Abou	(England) West Ham United	Loan

=== Players out ===
Player	To	Fee
(Scotland) Ray Montgomerie	(Scotland) Partick Thistle	Free
(Scotland) John Henry	(Scotland) Falkirk	Undisclosed
(Scotland) Martin O'Neill	(Scotland) Clydebank	Free
(Scotland) Mark Roberts	(Scotland) Raith Rovers	Loan
(Scotland) Chris Innes	(Scotland) Falkirk	Loan
(Scotland) Colin Stewart	(Scotland) Clydebank	Loan
(Scotland) Gary McCutcheon	(Scotland) Clydebank	Loan
(Scotland) Stuart Davidson	(Scotland) Queen of the South	Loan
