= 1997–98 Kilmarnock F.C. season =

Kilmarnock
1997–98 season
- Manager: Bobby Williamson
- Stadium: Rugby Park
- Scottish Premier Division: Fourth place
- Scottish Cup: Fourth round
- League Cup: Third round
- UEFA Cup Winners' Cup: First round
- Top goalscorer: League: Paul Wright (10); All: Wright (12)
- Highest home attendance: 18,076 v Celtic, Premier Division, 8 April 1998
- Lowest home attendance: 6,588 v Motherwell, Premier Division, 8 October 1997
- Average home league attendance: 9,125
Home colours	Away colours

The 1997–98 season was Kilmarnock's final season in the Scottish Premier Division before the formation of the Scottish Premier League in 1998. Kilmarnock also competed in the Scottish Cup, League Cup and the UEFA Cup Winners' Cup.

== Summary ==
=== Season ===
Kilmarnock finished fourth in the Scottish Premier Division with 50 points. They reached the third round of the League Cup, losing to Stirling Albion, and the fourth round of the Scottish Cup, losing to rivals Ayr United. Kilmarnock also competed in the UEFA Cup Winners' Cup, losing to Nice in first round.

== Results and fixtures ==
Kilmarnock's score comes first

Win Draw Loss Postponed

=== Scottish Premier Division ===
Match	Date	Opponent	Venue	Result	Attendance	Scorers
1	2 August 1997	Aberdeen	A	0–0	14,041	
2	23 August 1997	Hibernian	A	0–4	9,559	
3	13 September 1997	Dundee United	A	2–1	6,883	Wright 15’, 53’ (pen.)
4	21 September 1997	Dunfermline Athletic	A	1–1	5,374	Wright 89’ (pen.)
5	24 September 1997	Rangers	H	0–3	15,367	
6	27 September 1997	Heart of Midlothian	H	0–3	7,875	
7	4 October 1997	Celtic	A	0–4	48,165	
8	8 October 1997	Motherwell	H	2–1	6,588	Vareille 31’ Burke 37’
9	18 October 1997	St. Johnstone	H	0–1	6,572	
10	25 October 1997	Hibernian	H	2–1	7,541	Roberts 54’ Nevin 57’
11	1 November 1997	Rangers	A	1–4	49,413	Mitchell 43’
12	8 November 1997	Motherwell	A	1–0	5,346	Roberts 67’ (pen.)
13	15 November 1997	Dundee United	H	1–3	7,402	Roberts 9’
14	23 November 1997	Heart of Midlothian	A	3–5	15,500	Nevin 5’ Holt 62’ Roberts 76’ (pen.)
15	29 November 1997	Dunfermline Athletic	H	2–1	6,667	Nevin 24’, 35’
16	6 December 1997	Celtic	H	0–0	15,632	
17	13 December 1997	St. Johnstone	A	1–1	4,385	Mitchell 71’
18	20 December 1997	Aberdeen	H	1–0	8,452	Wright 27’
19	27 December 1997	Hibernian	A	1–0	10,543	Wright 43’
20	3 January 1998	Motherwell	H	4–1	8,724	Wright 8’, 33 Mitchell 44’ Roberts 88’
21	10 January 1998	Dundee United	A	1–1	7,541	Reilly 69’
22	17 January 1998	Heart of Midlothian	H	2–2	11,079	Wright 40’ Reilly 76’
23	31 January 1998	Dunfermline Athletic	A	2–3	4,903	Vareille 31’ Roberts 85’
24	7 February 1998	St. Johnstone	H	1–0	7,408	Reilly 90’
25	21 February 1998	Celtic	A	0–4	49,231	
26	24 February 1998	Rangers	H	1–1	15,412	Wright 15’
27	28 February 1998	Aberdeen	A	0–0	10,243	
28	14 March 1998	Heart of Midlothian	A	1–1	15,338	Henry 34’
29	21 March 1998	Dunfermline Athletic	H	3–0	8,230	Wright 62’ (pen.) Nevin 65’ McIntyre 69’
30	28 March 1998	St. Johnstone	A	0–1	4,982	
31	8 April 1998	Celtic	H	1–2	18,076	Burke 40’
32	11 April 1998	Motherwell	A	1–1	6,209	Holt 28’
33	18 April 1998	Dundee United	H	1–0	7,246	Burke 2’
34	25 April 1998	Aberdeen	H	2–1	8,212	Vareille 33’, 85’
35	2 May 1998	Rangers	A	1–0	50,116	Mitchell 90’
36	9 May 1998	Hibernian	H	1–1	12,393	Roberts 15’

=== Scottish League Cup ===
Match	Date	Opponent	Venue	Result	Attendance	Scorers
Third round	20 August 1997	Stirling Albion	A	2–6	2,154	Vareille, Wright

=== Scottish Cup ===
Match	Date	Opponent	Venue	Result	Attendance	Scorers
Third round	24 January 1998	Stranraer	A	2–0	4,468	Vareille, Roberts
Fourth round	14 February 1998	Ayr United	A	0–2	9,286	

=== UEFA Cup Winners’ Cup ===
Match	Date	Opponent	Venue	Result	Attendance	Scorers
Qualifying Round 1st Leg	14 August 1997	(Republic of Ireland) Shelbourne	H	2–1	9,041	Wright 66’, 90’ (Pen.)
Qualifying Round 2nd Leg	28 August 1997	(Republic of Ireland) Shelbourne	A	1–1	8,100	McIntyre 22’
First Round 1st Leg	18 September 1997	(France) Nice	A	1–3	10,812	Wright 78’ (Pen.)
First Round 2nd Leg	2 October 1997	(France) Nice	H	1–1	8,402	Reilly 32’

=== Ayrshire Cup ===
Match	Date	Opponent	Venue	Result	Attendance	Scorers
Final	13 May 1998	Ayr United	H	4–2	4,652	Millen o.g., Mitchell, Roberts, Kerr

== Competitions ==
=== League table ===
Pos	Team	Pld	W	D	L	GF	GA	GD	Pts	Qualification or relegation
2	Rangers	36	21	9	6	76	38	+38	72	Qualification for the UEFA Cup first qualifying round
3	Heart of Midlothian	36	19	10	7	70	46	+24	67	Qualification for the Cup Winners' Cup qualifying round
4	Kilmarnock	36	13	11	12	40	52	−12	50	Qualification for the UEFA Cup first qualifying round
5	St Johnstone	36	13	9	14	38	42	−4	48	
6	Aberdeen	36	9	12	15	39	53	−14	39	

Source: Rec.Sport.Soccer Statistics Foundation
Rules for classification: 1) Points; 2) Goal difference; 3) Goals scored

=== Division summary ===
Round	1	2	3	4	5	6	7	8	9	10	11	12	13	14	15	16	17	18	19	20	21	22	23	24	25	26	27	28	29	30	31	32	33	34	35	36
Ground	A	A	A	A	H	H	A	H	H	H	A	A	H	A	H	H	A	H	A	H	A	H	A	H	A	H	A	A	H	A	H	A	H	H	A	H
Result	D	L	W	D	L	L	L	W	L	W	L	W	L	L	W	D	D	W	W	W	D	D	L	W	L	D	D	D	W	L	L	D	W	W	W	D
Position	7	9	10	8	6	6	7	8	8	7	8	7	7	7	7	7	7	5	4	4	4	4	5	4	4	4	4	4	4	4	4	5	5	4	4	4

Updated to match(es) played on 25 April 2020. Source:
A = Away; H = Home; W = Win; D = Draw; L = Loss

== Transfers ==
=== Players in ===
Player	Previous Club	Fee
(France) Jérôme Vareille	(France) Mulhouse	Free
(Scotland) Martin O'Neill	(Scotland) Clyde	£75,000
(Scotland) Martin Baker	(Scotland) St Mirren	Swap Deal
(Scotland) Pat Nevin	(England) Tranmere Rovers	£60,000
(Scotland) Gordon Marshall	(Scotland) Celtic	£150,000

=== Players out ===
Player	Subsequent Club	Fee
(Germany) Helmut Rahner	(Germany) FC Nürnberg	Free
(Scotland) Tom Brown	(Scotland) St Mirren	Swap Deal
(Republic of Ireland) Gary Tallon	(England) Mansfield Town	Free
(Scotland) Gary McCutcheon	(Scotland) Stenhousemuir	Loan
(Scotland) Colin McKee	Free agent	Free
(Federal Republic of Yugoslavia) Dragoje Leković	(Spain) Sporting Gijón	Nominal
(Scotland) Derek Anderson	(Scotland) Ayr United	Free
(Scotland) Jim McIntyre	(England) Reading	£440,000
(Scotland) Mark Reilly	(England) Reading	Free
