= 1996–97 Kilmarnock F.C. season =

Kilmarnock
1996–97 season
- Manager: Alex Totten (until 4 December); Bobby Williamson
- Stadium: Rugby Park
- Scottish Premier Division: Seventh Place
- League Cup: Second Round
- Scottish Cup: Winners
- Top goalscorer: League: Paul Wright (15); All: Paul Wright (18)
- Highest home attendance: 16,432 vs. Rangers, Premier Division, 15 January 1997
- Lowest home attendance: 5,505 vs. Raith Rovers, Premier Division, 11 January 1997
- Average home league attendance: 9,125
| Home colours | Away colours |

The 1996–97 season was Kilmarnock's penultimate season in the Scottish Premier Division before the formation of the Scottish Premier League in 1998. Kilmarnock also competed in the Scottish Cup and the League Cup.

== Summary ==
=== Season ===
Kilmarnock finished seventh in the Scottish Premier Division with 39 points. They reached the second round of the League Cup, losing to rivals Ayr United, but went on to win the Scottish Cup, with a 1–0 victory over Falkirk.

== Results and fixtures ==
Kilmarnock's score comes first

Win Draw Loss Postponed

=== Scottish Premier Division ===
| Match | Date | Opponent | Venue | Result | Attendance | Scorers |
|---|---|---|---|---|---|---|
| 1 | 10 August 1996 | Hibernian | A | 2–1 | 8,734 | Mitchell 20’, Henry 26’ |
| 2 | 17 August 1996 | Heart of Midlothian | A | 2–3 | 10,854 | Wright 43’, Lauchlan 88’ |
| 3 | 24 August 1996 | Celtic | H | 1–3 | 15,970 | Reilly 27’ |
| 4 | 7 September 1996 | Dunfermline Athletic | H | 2–2 | 6,623 | Wright 44’, 56 pen. |
| 5 | 14 September 1996 | Aberdeen | A | 0–3 | 11,826 | |
| 6 | 21 September 1996 | Rangers | H | 1–4 | 14,812 | Reilly 19’ |
| 7 | 28 September 1996 | Motherwell | A | 0–1 | 5,705 | |
| 8 | 12 October 1996 | Dundee United | A | 0–0 | 7,365 | |
| 9 | 19 October 1996 | Raith Rovers | H | 2–1 | 5,829 | Brown 37’ Wright 58’ |
| 10 | 26 October 1996 | Dunfermline Athletic | A | 1–2 | 5,705 | Findlay 22’ |
| 11 | 1 November 1996 | Hibernian | H | 4–2 | 10,872 | Henry 17’, McIntyre 24’ Wright 52’, McGinlay 56’ o.g. |
| 12 | 16 November 1996 | Motherwell | H | 2–4 | 7,087 | Wright 55’, 87’ pen. |
| 13 | 30 November 1996 | Raith Rovers | A | 0–1 | 3,749 | |
| 14 | 7 December 1996 | Dundee United | H | 0–2 | 5,812 | |
| 15 | 14 December 1996 | Heart of Midlothian | H | 2–0 | 5,832 | McKee 52’, Mitchell 86’ |
| 16 | 17 December 1996 | Rangers | A | 2–4 | 39,469 | Montgomerie 4’, Roberts 88’ |
| 17 | 21 December 1996 | Aberdeen | H | 3–0 | 6,114 | Burke 11’, 58’ Roberts 89’ |
| 18 | 26 December 1996 | Hibernian | A | 1–0 | 8,957 | McIntyre 42’ |
| 19 | 4 January 1997 | Dundee United | A | 0–2 | 8,508 | |
| 20 | 8 January 1997 | Celtic | A | 0–6 | 45,535 | |
| 21 | 11 January 1997 | Raith Rovers | H | 0–1 | 5,505 | |
| 22 | 15 January 1997 | Rangers | H | 1–1 | 16,432 | McKee 46’ |
| 23 | 18 January 1997 | Dunfermline Athletic | H | 2–1 | 5,813 | Wright 55’ pen., 87’ |
| 24 | 21 January 1997 | Motherwell | A | 0–2 | 5,508 | |
| 25 | 1 February 1997 | Aberdeen | A | 1–2 | 8,000 | McIntyre 49’ |
| 26 | 8 February 1997 | Heart of Midlothian | A | 0–2 | 11,020 | |
| 27 | 22 February 1997 | Dundee United | H | 2–3 | 6,054 | Malpas 3’ o.g. Wright 69’ |
| 28 | 5 March 1997 | Raith Rovers | A | 1–2 | 3,305 | McIntyre 86’ |
| 29 | 11 March 1997 | Celtic | H | 2–0 | 15,087 | Wright 24’ Burke 74’ |
| 30 | 15 March 1997 | Motherwell | H | 1–0 | 7,612 | Wright 77’ |
| 31 | 22 March 1997 | Rangers | A | 2–1 | 50,036 | McIntyre 38’ Wright 81’ pen. |
| 32 | 5 April 1997 | Heart of Midlothian | H | 1–0 | 7,877 | Wright 5’ |
| 33 | 19 April 1997 | Hibernian | H | 1–1 | 10,886 | Wright 14’ |
| 34 | 3 May 1997 | Dunfermline Athletic | A | 1–3 | 5,036 | McIntyre 50’ |
| 35 | 7 May 1997 | Celtic | A | 0–0 | 42,994 | |
| 36 | 10 May 1997 | Aberdeen | H | 1–1 | 10,027 | Holt 73’ |

=== Scottish League Cup ===
| Match | Date | Opponent | Venue | Result | Attendance | Scorers |
|---|---|---|---|---|---|---|
| Second Round | 13 August 1996 | Ayr United | H | 0–1 | 8,543 | |

=== Scottish Cup ===
| Match | Date | Opponent | Venue | Result | Attendance | Scorers |
|---|---|---|---|---|---|---|
| Third Round | 25 January 1997 | East Stirlingshire | H | 2–0 | 8,543 | McGowne 44’ Brown 48’ |
| Fourth Round | 15 February 1997 | Clyde | A | 0–1 | 4,483 | Wright 63’ pen. |
| Quarter–final | 8 March 1997 | Greenock Morton | A | 5–2 | 8,826 | Henry 13’, 41’, 89’ Wright 32’ McIntyre 67’ |
| Semi–final | 14 April 1997 | Dundee United | N | 0–0 | 12,391 | |
| Semi–final Replay | 22 April 1997 | Dundee United | N | 1–0 | 9,265 | McIntyre 86’ |
| Final | 24 May 1997 | Falkirk | N | 1–0 | 48,953 | Wright 20’ |

=== Ayrshire Cup ===
| Match | Date | Opponent | Venue | Result | Attendance | Scorers |
|---|---|---|---|---|---|---|
| Final | 13 May 1997 | Ayr United | A | 0–2 | 2,176 | |

== Competitions ==
=== League table ===
| Pos | Team | Pld | W | D | L | GF | GA | GD | Pts | Qualification or relegation |
|---|---|---|---|---|---|---|---|---|---|---|
| 5 | Dunfermline Athletic | 36 | 12 | 9 | 15 | 52 | 65 | −13 | 45 | |
| 6 | Aberdeen | 36 | 10 | 14 | 12 | 45 | 54 | −9 | 44 | |
| 7 | Kilmarnock | 36 | 11 | 6 | 19 | 41 | 61 | −20 | 39 | Qualification for the Cup Winners' Cup qualifying round (Note: Kilmarnock qualified for the Cup Winners' Cup as the winners of the Scottish Cup.) |
| 8 | Motherwell | 36 | 9 | 11 | 16 | 44 | 55 | −11 | 38 | |
| 9 | Hibernian (O) | 36 | 9 | 11 | 16 | 38 | 55 | −17 | 38 | Qualification for the Play-off |

Source: Soccerbase
Rules for classification: 1) Points; 2) Goal difference; 3) Goals scored
(O) Play-off winners

=== Division summary ===
| Round | 1 | 2 | 3 | 4 | 5 | 6 | 7 | 8 | 9 | 10 | 11 | 12 | 13 | 14 | 15 | 16 | 17 | 18 | 19 | 20 | 21 | 22 | 23 | 24 | 25 | 26 | 27 | 28 | 29 | 30 | 31 | 32 | 33 | 34 | 35 | 36 |
|---|---|---|---|---|---|---|---|---|---|---|---|---|---|---|---|---|---|---|---|---|---|---|---|---|---|---|---|---|---|---|---|---|---|---|---|---|
| Ground | A | A | H | H | A | H | A | A | H | A | H | H | A | H | H | A | H | A | A | A | H | H | H | A | A | A | H | A | H | H | A | H | H | A | A | H |
| Result | W | L | L | D | L | L | L | D | W | L | W | L | L | L | W | L | W | W | L | L | L | D | W | L | L | L | L | L | W | W | W | W | D | L | D | D |
| Position | 2 | 4 | 7 | 7 | 8 | 8 | 9 | 9 | 8 | 9 | 9 | 9 | 9 | 9 | 9 | 10 | 10 | 9 | 8 | 8 | 9 | 9 | 9 | 8 | 8 | 9 | 9 | 9 | 9 | 7 | 7 | 7 | 7 | 7 | 7 | 7 |

Updated to match(es) played on 25 April 2020. Source:
A = Away; H = Home; W = Win; D = Draw; L = Loss

== Transfers ==
=== Transfers in ===
| Player | Previous Club | Fee |
|---|---|---|
| (Republic of Ireland) Gary Tallon | (England) Blackburn Rovers | Free |
| (Sweden) Robert Prytz | (Switzerland) Young Boys | Free |
| (Scotland) Kevin McGowne | (Scotland) St Johnstone | Free |
| (Malta) Dylan Kerr | (England) Reading | Free |
| (Germany) Helmut Rahner | (Germany) Uerdingen | Free |

=== Transfers out ===
| Player | Subsequent Club | Fee |
|---|---|---|
| (Scotland) Tom Black | (Scotland) Stranraer | Free |
| (Scotland) Bobby Connor | (Scotland) Ayr United | Free |
| (Scotland) Bobby Geddes | (Scotland) Raith Rovers | Free |
| (Scotland) Stephen Maskrey | (Scotland) Partick Thistle | Free |
| (Republic of Ireland) Gary Tallon | (England) Chester City | Loan |
