= 2000–01 Kilmarnock F.C. season =

Kilmarnock
2000-01 season
- Manager: Bobby Williamson
- Stadium: Rugby Park
- SPL: Fourth Place
- Scottish Cup: Quarter–Final
- League Cup: Runners-Up
- Top goalscorer: League: Paul Wright (8); All: Paul Wright & Craig Dargo (9)
- Highest home attendance: 14,679 v Rangers, SPL, 5 August 2000
- Lowest home attendance: 6,018 v Motherwell, SPL, 3 February 2001
- Average home league attendance: 8,224
Home colours	Away colours

The 2000–01 season was Kilmarnock's third consecutive season in the Scottish Premier League. Kilmarnock also competed in the Scottish Cup and the Scottish League Cup.

== Summary ==
=== Season ===
Kilmarnock finished fourth in the Scottish Premier League with 54 points. They reached the final of the League Cup but were beaten by Celtic. They also reached the quarter–final of the Scottish Cup, losing to Hibernian.

== Results and fixtures ==
Kilmarnock's score comes first

Win Draw Loss Postponed

=== Scottish Premier League ===
Match	Date	Opponent	Venue	Result	Attendance	Scorers
1	29 July 2000	St Mirren	A	1–0	7,388	Holt 72'
2	5 August 2000	Rangers	H	2–4	14,679	McLaren 3', 10'
3	13 August 2000	Celtic	A	1–2	58,054	McLaren 17'
4	16 August 2000	Hibernian	H	0–1	8,672	
5	19 August 2000	Motherwell	H	3–2	6,533	Dargo 26', Wright 76', Dindeleux 80'
6	26 August 2000	St Johnstone	A	1–1	3,773	McLaren 13'
7	9 September 2000	Dundee United	H	1–0	6,380	Mitchell 30'
8	16 September 2000	Aberdeen	H	1–0	6,876	Mitchell 26'
9	24 September 2000	Heart of Midlothian	A	2–0	10,379	Wright 5', Dindeleux 46'
10	30 September 2000	Dundee	A	0–0	6,170	
11	14 October 2000	Dunfermline Athletic	H	2–1	6,436	Wright 37', Holt 83'
12	21 October 2000	St Mirren	H	2–1	6,436	McLaren 47', Mahood 59'
13	28 October 2000	Rangers	A	3–0	49,569	Cocard 5', Holt 32', Numan 67' (o.g.)
14	5 November 2000	Celtic	H	0–1	13,417	
15	11 November 2000	Hibernian	A	1–1	12,588	Wright 86'
16	18 November 2000	Motherwell	A	2–1	6,571	Wright 37', Cocard 87'
17	25 November 2000	St Johnstone	H	0–2	6,330	
18	28 November 2000	Dundee United	A	1–0	5,497	Dargo 77'
19	2 December 2000	Aberdeen	A	2–1	12,573	McLaren 38', Fowler 38'
20	9 December 2000	Heart of Midlothian	H	0–3	6,823	
21	16 December 2000	Dundee	H	2–3	6,573	Cocard 3', Baker 46'
22	23 December 2000	Dunfermline Athletic	A	0–1	6,054	
23	26 December 2000	St Mirren	A	3–1	5,649	Wright 66', 85', 90'
24	2 January 2001	Celtic	A	0–6	59,380	
25	30 January 2001	Hibernian	H	1–1	6,385	Hay 68'
26	3 February 2001	Motherwell	H	1–2	6,018	Dargo 90'
27	11 February 2001	St Johnstone	A	2–1	6,627	Dargo 70', Canero 90'
28	24 February 2001	Dundee United	H	0–0	6,227	
29	3 March 2001	Aberdeen	H	0–0	6,580	
30	14 March 2001	Heart of Midlothian	A	0–3	9,195	
31	31 March 2001	Dundee	A	2–2	6,719	Dargo 4', Mahood 74'
32	7 April 2001	Dunfermline Athletic	H	2–1	6,529	McCoist 43', MacPherson 67'
33	11 April 2001	Rangers	H	1–2	14,358	Hay 74'
34	21 April 2001	Hibernian	A	1–1	8,224	Cocard 11'
35	27 April 2001	Heart of Midlothian	H	1–1	6,827	McGowne 53'
36	5 May 2001	Dundee	A	1–2	6,261	Dargo 88'
37	12 May 2001	Rangers	A	1–5	46,557	Dargo 70'
38	20 May 2001	Celtic	H	1–0	12,675	Mahood 78'

=== Scottish League Cup ===
Match	Date	Opponent	Venue	Result	Attendance	Scorers
Second Round	22 August 2000	Clyde	A	2–1	2,010	Dindeleux 112', McCoist 113'
Third Round	5 September 2000	St Johnstone	A	1–0	3,231	McCoist 68'
Quarter–Final	31 October 2000	Hibernian	H	2–1	7,819	McLaren 46', Dargo 71'
Semi–Final	6 February 2001	St Mirren	N	3–0	9,213	McLaren 39', Dargo 69', Canero 78'
Final	18 March 2001	Celtic	N	0–3	48,883	

=== Scottish Cup ===
Match	Date	Opponent	Venue	Result	Attendance	Scorers
Third Round	27 January 2001	Partick Thistle	H	1–0	8,836	Mitchell 28'
Fourth Round	17 February 2001	Inverness CT	A	1–1	5,294	Hay 90'
Fourth Round Replay	6 March 2001	Inverness CT	H	2–1	6,528	McGowne 60', Wright 90'
Quarter–Final	10 March 2001	Hibernian	H	0–1	8,287	

== Player statistics ==
As of 20 May 2001 (UTC)

No.	Pos	Nat	Player	Total		Premier League		League Cup		Scottish Cup	
No.	Pos	Nat	Player	Apps	Goals	Apps	Goals	Apps	Goals	Apps	Goals
1	GK	(Scotland) SCO	Gordon Marshall	39	0	31+0	0	4+0	0	4+0	0
2	DF	(Scotland) SCO	Gus McPherson	40	1	32+0	1	5+0	0	3+0	0
3	DF	(Scotland) SCO	Neil MacFarlane	0	0	0+0	0	0+0	0	0+0	0
5	DF	(Scotland) SCO	Kevin McGowne	25	2	20+0	1	2+0	0	3+0	1
6	MF	(France) FRA	Christophe Cocard	40	4	16+17	4	2+1	0	3+1	0
7	MF	(Scotland) SCO	Mark Reilly	18	0	11+3	0	0+2	0	2+0	0
8	MF	(Scotland) SCO	Gary Holt	28	3	19+0	3	5+0	0	4+0	0
8	MF	(Spain) ESP	Jesús Sanjuán	3	0	3+0	0	0+0	0	0+0	0
9	FW	(Scotland) SCO	Paul Wright	33	9	15+10	8	3+1	0	3+1	1
10	MF	(Scotland) SCO	Ian Durrant	17	0	12+2	0	2+1	0	0+0	0
11	MF	(Scotland) SCO	Ally Mitchell	32	3	25+1	2	2+0	1	4+0	0
12	GK	(Scotland) SCO	Colin Meldrum	9	0	7+1	0	1+0	0	0+0	0
13	FW	(Scotland) SCO	Ally McCoist	22	3	11+7	1	1+1	2	0+2	0
14	MF	(Scotland) SCO	Alan Mahood	41	3	33+1	3	4+0	0	3+0	0
15	FW	(France) FRA	Jérôme Vareille	11	0	2+7	0	1+0	0	0+1	0
16	DF	(Scotland) SCO	Martin Baker	20	1	14+0	1	2+0	0	4+0	0
17	DF	(France) FRA	Frédéric Dindeleux	44	3	35+0	2	5+0	1	4+0	0
18	DF	(England) ENG	Sean Hessey	7	0	6+0	0	1+0	0	0+0	0
19	FW	(Scotland) SCO	Craig Dargo	30	9	16+9	7	2+1	2	2+0	0
20	FW	(Scotland) SCO	Andy McLaren	40	8	30+2	6	4+1	2	2+1	0
21	DF	(Scotland) SCO	Chris Innes	29	0	23+1	0	3+0	0	2+0	0
22	FW	(Scotland) SCO	Kris Boyd	1	0	0+1	0	0+0	0	0+0	0
24	DF	(Scotland) SCO	Garry Hay	37	3	27+4	2	3+0	0	0+3	1
25	MF	(Spain) ESP	Antonio Calderón	7	0	7+0	0	0+0	0	0+0	0
26	MF	(Scotland) SCO	James Fowler	18	1	3+11	1	0+3	0	0+1	0
28	MF	(Scotland) SCO	Stuart Davidson	2	0	2+0	0	0+0	0	0+0	0
29	GK	(Scotland) SCO	Colin Stewart	0	0	0+0	0	0+0	0	0+0	0
30	FW	(Scotland) SCO	Paul Di Giacomo	10	0	2+8	0	0+0	0	0+0	0
31	DF	(Scotland) SCO	Peter Canero	34	2	16+12	1	1+1	1	3+1	0
33	FW	(Scotland) SCO	Andy Smith	0	0	0+0	0	0+0	0	0+0	0

== Final league table ==
Pos	Team	Pld	W	D	L	GF	GA	GD	Pts	Qualification or relegation (Note: Teams played each other three times (33 matches), before the league split into two groups (the top six and the bottom six) for the last five matches.)
2	Rangers	38	26	4	8	76	36	+40	82	Qualification for the Champions League second qualifying round
3	Hibernian	38	18	12	8	57	35	+22	66	Qualification for the UEFA Cup first round
4	Kilmarnock	38	15	9	14	44	53	−9	54	Qualification for the UEFA Cup qualifying round (Note: As both finalists of the 2000–01 Scottish Cup, Celtic and Hibernian, qualified for European competition via their league position, the cup berth for 2001–02 UEFA Cup was passed to the next-placed team in the league, fourth-placed Kilmarnock.)
5	Heart of Midlothian	38	14	10	14	56	50	+6	52	
6	Dundee	38	13	8	17	51	49	+2	47	Qualification for the UEFA Intertoto Cup first round (Note: Dundee qualified for the 2001 UEFA Intertoto Cup as the highest-placed team to apply for a place in the competition.)

Source: Scottish Professional Football League
Rules for classification: 1) Points; 2) Goal difference; 3) Goals scored

=== Division summary ===
Round	1	2	3	4	5	6	7	8	9	10	11	12	13	14	15	16	17	18	19	20	21	22	23	24	25	26	27	28	29	30	31	32	33	34	35	36	37	38
Ground	A	H	A	H	H	A	H	H	A	A	H	H	A	H	A	A	H	A	A	H	H	A	A	A	H	H	A	H	H	A	A	H	H	A	H	A	A	H
Result	W	L	L	L	W	D	W	W	W	D	W	W	W	L	D	W	L	W	W	L	L	L	W	L	D	L	W	D	D	L	D	W	L	D	D	L	L	W
Position	4	6	7	8	6	7	6	4	4	4	4	4	3	4	4	4	4	4	4	4	4	4	4	4	4	4	4	4	4	4	4	5	4	4	4	5	5	4

A = Away; H = Home; W = Win; D = Draw; L = Loss

== Transfers ==
=== Players in ===
Player	From	Fee
(Scotland) Craig Dargo	(Scotland) Raith Rovers	Free
(Scotland) Neil McFarlane	(Scotland) Queen’s Park	Free
(Scotland) Andy McLaren	Free Agent	Free
(England) Sam Keevill	(England) Fulham	Free
(Spain) Jesús García Sanjuán	(Scotland) Airdrieonians	Free
(Spain) Antonio Calderón	(Scotland) Airdrieonians	Free

=== Players out ===
Player	To	Fee
(Scotland) Andy Smith	(Scotland) Ross County	Loan
(Malta) Dylan Kerr	(England) Slough Town	Free
(England) Michael Jeffrey	(England) Grimsby Town	Free
(Scotland) Colin Stewart	(Scotland) Queen’s Park	Loan
(Scotland) David Bagan	(Scotland) Inverness CT	Free
(Scotland) Jim Lauchlan	(England) Barnsley	Loan
(Scotland) Gary McCutcheon	(Northern Ireland) Portadown	Loan
(Scotland) Neil McFarlane	(Scotland) Queen’s Park	Loan
(Scotland) Alex Burke	(Scotland) Falkirk	Free
(Scotland) Tosh McKinlay	Retired	
(Scotland) Gary Holt	(England) Norwich City	£135,000
(Scotland) Andy Smith	(Scotland) Raith Rovers	Free
(Scotland) Jim Lauchlan	(Scotland) Dundee United	Free
(Scotland) Stuart Davidson	(Scotland) Airdrieonians	Loan
