= 1997 Scottish Cup final =

1997 Scottish Cup Final
- Event: 1996–97 Scottish Cup
Kilmarnock	Falkirk
1	0
- Date: 24 May 1997
- Venue: Ibrox Stadium, Glasgow
- Man of the Match: Andy Gray
- Referee: Hugh Dallas
- Attendance: 48,953

The 1997 Scottish Cup Final was the 112th final of the Scottish Cup, Scottish football's most prestigious knockout association football competition. The match took place at Ibrox Stadium in Glasgow on 24 May 1997 and was contested by Scottish Premier Division club Kilmarnock and Scottish Division One club Falkirk. It was Kilmarnock's eighth Scottish Cup Final and Falkirk's third. The match was the first Scottish Cup final in forty years not to feature a club from one of Scotland's cities, Falkirk and Kilmarnock being towns, the last coming when the same clubs previously met in the 1957 final.

As Premier and Division One clubs, both Kilmarnock and Falkirk entered the competition in the third round. Neither club won all four of their ties at the first attempt. Kilmarnock defeated three teams from the three tiers below the Premier Division before needing a replay to defeat Dundee United in the semi-finals. Falkirk required two replays to reach the final. They defeated three Premier Division clubs and needed a replay to see off Division Two club Berwick Rangers as well as Celtic in the semi-finals.

The match was Kilmarnock's eighth appearance in the final and Falkirk's third. Kilmarnock had previously won the final twice whilst Falkirk had won both of its previous final appearances. Falkirk's last appearance was in 1957 in a victory over Kilmarnock, whilst it was their first appearance in the final since 1960.

Kilmarnock won the match 1–0, the only goal coming from Paul Wright in the 20th minute of the first half. With an assist from Kevin McGowne

== Route to the final ==
=== Kilmarnock ===
Round	Opposition	Score
Third round	East Stirlingshire	2–0
Fourth round	Clyde	1–0
Quarter-final	Greenock Morton	5–2
Semi-final	Dundee United	0–0
Semi-final replay	Dundee United	1–0

As a Premier Division club, Kilmarnock entered the competition in the third round and were drawn against Division Three club East Stirlingshire who started in the second round. Kilmarnock won the tie 2–0 at Rugby Park. In the fourth round the club was drawn away to Clyde and produced a narrow 1–0 victory to progress to the quarter-finals. Morton was the opposition provided and Kilmarnock triumphed in a 7-goal thriller at Cappielow, winning 5–2. In the semi-finals, Kilmarnock was drawn against Dundee United with the match played at the neutral venue of Easter Road in Edinburgh. The match ended 0–0 with the replay a week later ending in a 1–0 victory for the Ayrshire club. Kilmarnock reached the final for the first time since 1960 when they were defeated by Rangers.

=== Falkirk ===
Round	Opposition	Score
Third round	Berwick Rangers	1–1
Third round replay	Berwick Rangers	2–1
Fourth round	Dunfermline Athletic	2–1
Quarter-final	Raith Rovers	2–0
Semi-final	Celtic	1–1
Semi-final replay	Celtic	1–0

Along with Kilmarnock, Falkirk started the competition in the third round and were drawn against Berwick Rangers at home. The clubs played out a 1–1 draw with the replay a week later resulting in a 2–1 victory for Falkirk to enter the next round. The club faced rivals Dunfermline Athletic at Brockville Park with the club winning 2–1. The quarter-final draw paired Falkirk with other Fife club, Raith Rovers. Falkirk won the tie to set up a semi-final clash with Celtic. The first tie was played at Ibrox Stadium in Glasgow and ended in a 1–1 draw resulting in a replay. Falkirk emerged 1–0 winners in the replay at Ibrox, progressing to their first in forty years since defeating Kilmarnock in a repeat of the fixture in the 1957 competition.

== Match details ==
24 May 1997
15:00 BST

Kilmarnock	1–0	Falkirk
Wright 20'	Report

Ibrox Stadium, Glasgow
Attendance: 48,953
Referee: Hugh Dallas

Kilmarnock	Falkirk

GK	(Federal Republic of Yugoslavia) Dragoje Leković
DF	(Scotland) Gus MacPherson
DF	(England) Dylan Kerr
DF	(Scotland) Ray Montgomerie (c)
DF	(Scotland) Kevin McGowne
MF	(Scotland) Mark Reilly
MF	(Scotland) David Bagan	(substituted off) 85'
MF	(Scotland) Alex Burke
MF	(Scotland) Gary Holt
FW	(Scotland) Jim McIntyre	(substituted off) 82'
FW	(Scotland) Paul Wright	(substituted off) 77'
Substitutes:
MF	(Scotland) Ally Mitchell	(substituted in) 85'
MF	(Scotland) John Henry	(substituted in) 77'
FW	(Scotland) Tom Brown	(substituted in) 82'
Manager:
(Scotland) Bobby Williamson

GK	(Scotland) Craig Nelson
DF	(England) Jamie McGowan (c)
DF	(Scotland) Andy Seaton
DF	(Scotland) Neil Oliver
DF	(Scotland) Kevin James
DF	(England) Andy Gray
MF	(Scotland) Scott MacKenzie
MF	(Scotland) David Hagen
FW	(Scotland) Kevin McAllister
FW	(Scotland) Scott Crabbe	Substituted off
FW	(Scotland) Paul McGrillen	Substituted off
Substitutes:
GK	(Scotland) Paul Mathers
MF	(Scotland) Albert Craig	Substituted in
FW	(Austria) Gerhard Fellner	Substituted in
Manager:
(Scotland) Alex Totten

Match officials

- Assistant referees:
- Fourth official:

Match rules

- 90 minutes.
- 30 minutes of extra-time if necessary.
- Penalty shoot-out if scores still level.
- Five named substitutes.
- Maximum of three substitutions.
