= 1990–91 Hibernian F.C. season =

Hibernian
1990–91 season
- Manager: Alex Miller
- Scottish Premier Division: 9th
- Scottish Cup: R4
- Scottish League Cup: R3
- Highest home attendance: 17,354 (v Rangers, 1 September)
- Lowest home attendance: 3791 (v Dundee United, 20 April)
- Average home league attendance: 9257 (down 1448)

The 1990–91 season saw Hibernian compete in the Scottish Premier Division, in which they finished 9th. They also competed in the Scottish Cup, where they were knocked out in the fourth round, and the Scottish League Cup, in which they were eliminated in the third round.

== Scottish Premier Division ==
Match Day	Date	Opponent	H/A	Score	Hibernian Scorer(s)	Attendance
1	25 August	Aberdeen	A	0–2		16,374
2	1 September	Rangers	H	0–0		17,534
3	8 September	Celtic	A	0–2		29,464
4	15 September	Heart of Midlothian	H	0–3		16,813
5	22 September	St Johnstone	H	1–0	Hamilton	6,361
6	29 September	Dunfermline Athletic	A	1–1	Findlay	7,704
7	6 October	St Mirren	H	1–0	Weir	4,416
8	13 October	Dundee United	A	0–1		10,288
9	20 October	Motherwell	H	1–0	O.G.	7,460
10	27 October	Aberdeen	H	1–1	Wright	10,022
11	3 November	Rangers	A	0–4		35,925
12	10 November	St Johnstone	A	1–1	Wright	9,233
13	17 November	Dunfermline Athletic	H	1–1	MacLeod	8,073
14	24 November	Heart of Midlothian	A	1–1	Houchen	19,004
15	1 December	Celtic	H	0–3		16,219
16	11 December	Motherwell	A	1–4	Orr	4,121
17	15 December	Dundee United	H	0–0		5,660
18	22 December	St Mirren	A	0–1		4,478
19	29 December	St Johnstone	H	0–1		7,104
20	2 January	Heart of Midlothian	H	1–4	O.G.	13,600
21	5 January	Celtic	A	1–1	Wright	20,526
22	12 January	Aberdeen	A	0–2		13,581
23	19 January	Rangers	H	0–2		15,086
24	2 February	Motherwell	H	1–1	MacLeod	5,568
25	9 February	Dundee United	A	0–0		6,114
26	2 March	St Mirren	H	4–3	Wright (2), Hunter, Evans	4,006
27	9 March	Celtic	H	0–2		13,232
28	16 March	Dunfermline Athletic	A	1–1	Wright (pen.)	4,830
29	23 March	Heart of Midlothian	A	1–3	Tortolano	14,221
30	30 March	Aberdeen	H	2–4	Hamilton, Evans	7,500
31	6 April	Rangers	A	0–0		35,507
32	13 April	Motherwell	A	0–1		5,012
33	20 April	Dundee United	H	1–0	Fellenger	3,791
34	27 April	St Johnstone	A	0–0		5,143
35	4 May	Dunfermline Athletic	H	3–0	Miller, McGinlay, Findlay	4,185
36	11 May	St Mirren	A	0–1		3,403

=== Final League table ===
Pos	Team	Pld	W	D	L	GF	GA	GD	Pts	Qualification or relegation
6	Motherwell	36	12	9	15	51	50	+1	33	Qualification for the Cup Winners' Cup first round
7	St Johnstone	36	11	9	16	41	54	−13	31	
8	Dunfermline Athletic	36	8	11	17	38	61	−23	27	
9	Hibernian	36	6	13	17	24	51	−27	25	
10	St Mirren	36	5	9	22	28	59	−31	19	

Source: Statto.com
Rules for classification: 1) points; 2) goal difference; 3) number of goals scored.

=== Scottish League Cup ===
Round	Date	Opponent	H/A	Score	Hibernian Scorer(s)	Attendance
R2	22 August	Meadowbank Thistle	A	1–0 (aet)	Houchen	3,849
R3	29 August	Raith Rovers	A	0–1		4,613

=== Scottish Cup ===
Round	Date	Opponent	H/A	Score	Hibernian Scorer(s)	Attendance
R3	28 January	Clyde	A	2–0	Houchen, Miller	4,000
R4	23 February	St Johnstone	A	1–2	Hamilton	9,153

== See also ==
- List of Hibernian F.C. seasons
