= Mark Reilly (disambiguation) =

Mark Reilly is a footballer.

Mark Reilly may also refer to:

- Mark Reilly, frontman of musical group Matt Bianco

== See also ==
- Mark Riley (disambiguation)
