= Mark Riley =

Mark Riley may refer to:

- Mark Anthony Riley, British physicist
- Mark Riley (American radio host) (born 1951), American broadcaster
- Mark Riley (Australian rules coach) (born 1963), Australian rules football coach
- Mark Riley (journalist), Australian television reporter
- Mark Riley (rugby league) (born 1967), former scrum half

== See also ==
- Marc Riley (born 1961), British radio host
- Mark Reilly (disambiguation)
