= Paul Wright (footballer) =

Scottish footballer and manager

Personal information
- Full name: Paul Hamilton Wright
- Date of birth: 17 August 1967 (age 59)
- Place of birth: East Kilbride, Scotland
- Height: 5 ft 8 in (1.73 m)
- Position: Striker

Youth career
- 1983–1985: Aberdeen

Senior career*
Years	Team	Apps	(Gls)
1984–1989	Aberdeen	68	(16)
1989–1990	Queens Park Rangers	15	(5)
1990–1991	Hibernian	36	(7)
1991–1995	St Johnstone	112	(40)
1995–2001	Kilmarnock	176	(58)
2001–2002	Falkirk	14	(2)
2002	Greenock Morton	13	(4)
	Larkhall Thistle	0	(0)
Total		434	(132)

International career
1987–1989	Scotland U21	4	(1)
1998	Scotland B	2	(1)

Managerial career
- 2015–2017: BSC Glasgow U20s
- * Club domestic league appearances and goals

Paul Hamilton Wright (born 17 August 1967) is a Scottish retired footballer whose position was striker. Wright played for seven professional clubs spanning 14 years.

== Playing career ==
Born in East Kilbride, South Lanarkshire, Wright's professional career began with Aberdeen in 1983. He won the Scottish Youth Cup as a trainee, alongside David Robertson, Joe Miller and Stevie Gray. However the competition for a striking place at Pittodrie was tough and he was never able to hold down a regular spot in the team, moving on to England and Queens Park Rangers for one season and then returning to Scotland for an equally brief spell with Hibernian.

It was in the mid-to-late 1990s, however, that Wright was at the peak of his career in the Scottish Premier Division, firstly with St Johnstone and then Kilmarnock. He was transferred from Hibs to St Johnstone for £275,000, and from St Johnstone to Kilmarnock for £340,000, becoming both clubs' record buys.

Wright scored the winning goal for Kilmarnock in the 1997 Scottish Cup Final against Falkirk.

He brought his professional playing career to a close in 2002 with Greenock Morton and moved into junior football with Larkhall Thistle.

== Coaching career ==
Wright moved into coaching after retirement and worked as Under-20s manager at Scottish Lowland Football League club BSC Glasgow until June 2017, when he joined his former Kilmarnock coach Alan Robertson at new South of Scotland League side Bonnyton Thistle. In May 2021 both Robertson and Wright left the club.

== Career statistics ==
Appearances and goals by club, season and competition
Club	Season	League			National Cup		League Cup		Europe		Other		Total	
Club	Season	Division	Apps	Goals	Apps	Goals	Apps	Goals	Apps	Goals	Apps	Goals	Apps	Goals
Aberdeen	1983–84	Scottish Premier Division	1	0	0	0	0	0	0	0	–	–	1	0
Aberdeen	1984–85	Scottish Premier Division	0	0	0	0	1	0	0	0	–	–	1	0
Aberdeen	1985–86	Scottish Premier Division	10	2	2	0	0	0	2	0	–	–	14	2
Aberdeen	1986–87	Scottish Premier Division	25	4	3	0	1	0	2	1	–	–	31	5
Aberdeen	1987–88	Scottish Premier Division	9	4	0	0	0	0	0	0	–	–	9	4
Aberdeen	1988–89	Scottish Premier Division	23	6	4	2	1	0	1	0	–	–	29	8
Aberdeen	Total		68	16	9	2	3	0	5	1	-	-	85	19
Queens Park Rangers	1989–90	First Division	15	5	–	–	–	–	–	–	–	–	15+	5+
Hibernian	1989–90	Scottish Premier Division	3	1	1	0	0	0	0	0	–	–	4	1
Hibernian	1990–91	Scottish Premier Division	33	6	0	0	1	0	0	0	–	–	34	6
Hibernian	Total		36	7	1	0	1	0	0	0	-	-	38	7
Kilmarnock	1994–95	Scottish Premier Division	7	1	0	0	0	0	0	0	–	–	7	1
Kilmarnock	1995–96	Scottish Premier Division	36	13	2	2	2	1	0	0	–	–	40	16
Kilmarnock	1996–97	Scottish Premier Division	31	15	5	3	1	0	0	0	–	–	37	18
Kilmarnock	1997–98	Scottish Premier Division	28	10	2	0	2	1	3	3	–	–	35	14
Kilmarnock	1998–99	SPL	33	6	0	0	2	2	4	0	–	–	39	8
Kilmarnock	1999-00	SPL	16	5	0	0	0	0	2	1	–	–	18	6
Kilmarnock	2000–01	SPL	25	8	4	1	4	0	0	0	–	–	33	9
Kilmarnock	Total		176	58	13	6	11	4	9	4	-	-	209	72
Falkirk	2001–02	Scottish First Division	14	2	0	0	2	0	0	0	1	0	17	2
Greenock Morton	2001–02	Scottish Second Division	13	4	0	0	0	0	0	0	–	–	13	4
Career total			322+	92+	23+	8+	17+	4+	14	5	1	0	377+	109+
