= Steven Hamilton (footballer) =

Scottish footballer (born 1975)

Personal information
- Date of birth: 19 March 1975 (age 51)
- Place of birth: Baillieston, Scotland
- Height: 1.75 m (5 ft 9 in)
- Position: Right back

Youth career
- 1991–1995: Kilmarnock

Senior career*
Years	Team	Apps	(Gls)
1995–1999	Kilmarnock	17	(0)
1995–1996	→ Troon (loan)		
1999–2001	Raith Rovers	33	(0)
2001–2002	Albion Rovers	33	(1)
2002–2004	Stenhousemuir	58	(0)
2004–2006	Brechin City	31	(0)
2006	Alloa Athletic	5	(0)
Total		177	(1)
- * Club domestic league appearances and goals

Steven Hamilton (born 19 March 1975) is a Scottish former footballer who played mainly as a right back.

He began his career at Kilmarnock, and was a squad member when Killie won the Scottish Cup in 1997 though was not in the 14-man pool for the final itself.

Hamilton then dropped down the divisions with spells at Raith Rovers, Albion Rovers, Stenhousemuir, Brechin City and Alloa Athletic. He later worked as a football development officer in roles with the Scottish Football Association (in partnership with Braidhurst High School and North Lanarkshire Council) and with Kilmarnock.
