= Neil MacFarlane (footballer) =

Scottish footballer (born 1977)

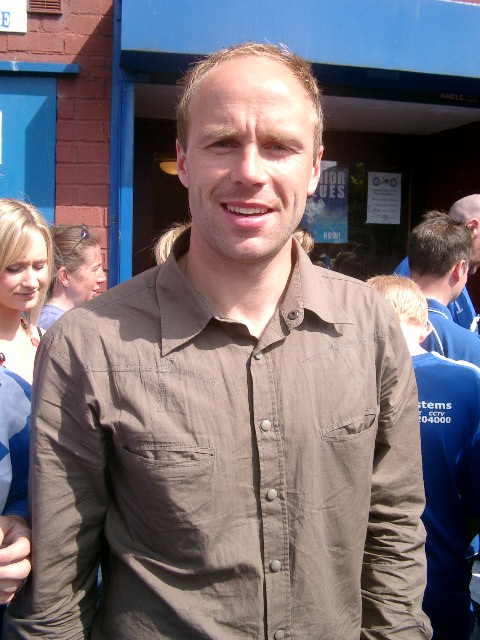
- MacFarlane outside Palmerston Park, Dumfries in 2008

Personal information
- Full name: Neil MacFarlane
- Date of birth: 10 October 1977 (age 49)
- Place of birth: Dunoon, Scotland
- Height: 1.85 m (6 ft 1 in)
- Position: Defensive midfielder

Team information
- Current team: Brentford (assistant first team coach); Scotland U19 (head coach)

Youth career
- –1999: Glasgow Amateurs U21

Senior career*
Years	Team	Apps	(Gls)
1999–2000	Queen's Park	36	(0)
2000–2001	Kilmarnock	0	(0)
2000–2001	→ Queen's Park (loan)	8	(0)
2001	→ Clyde (loan)	7	(0)
2001–2002	Airdrieonians	28	(3)
2002–2006	Heart of Midlothian	73	(0)
2006	Aberdeen	6	(0)
2006–2007	Gretna	5	(0)
2007–2009	Queen of the South	61	(1)
2009–2010	Greenock Morton	16	(0)
2010	Airdrie United	1	(0)
2011	Annan Athletic	15	(1)
Total		256	(5)

Managerial career
- 2015: Coventry City (caretaker)
- 2018–2019: Kidderminster Harriers
- 2019–2025: Brentford B
- 2024–: Scotland U19
- * Club domestic league appearances and goals

Neil MacFarlane (born 10 October 1977) is a Scottish professional football coach and former player who played as a defensive midfielder. He is assistant first team coach of Premier League club Brentford and head coach of the Scotland national under-19 team.

MacFarlane played for a number of clubs at all four levels of the Scottish league system. After his retirement as a player in 2011, he became a coach and was appointed to his first managerial role at English non-League club Kidderminster Harriers in 2018. One year later, he was appointed head coach of Brentford B. He served in the role until July 2025, when he was promoted into the role of assistant first team coach.

== Playing career ==
=== Early years (1999–2002) ===
McFarlane was born in Dunoon. A defensive midfielder, he began his senior career with Queen's Park in 1999 and won the Third Division title in his first season with the club. He moved to Scottish Premier League club Kilmarnock in July 2000, but failed to make a first team appearance and instead spent much of his single season at Rugby Park away on loan at former club Queen's Park and Clyde. MacFarlane transferred to First Division club Airdrieonians in July 2001 and though his 2001–02 season was ended prematurely by a cruciate ligament injury, he was a part of the team which was victorious in the 2001 Scottish Challenge Cup Final.

=== Heart of Midlothian (2002–2006) ===
Though still recovering from a cruciate ligament injury suffered while an Airdrieonians player, MacFarlane signed a one-year contract with Scottish Premier League club Heart of Midlothian in July 2002, on a part-time wage. He broke into the team in November 2002 and progressed sufficiently to sign an improved contract in January 2003. MacFarlane signed a new two-year contract at the end of the 2004–05 season and was a regular member of the team through to the early months of the 2005–06 season, when he fell out of favour under manager George Burley. A move to Dundee United was blocked by the Heart of Midlothian board in August 2005 and after suffering a knee injury, he made just one appearance under Burley's successor, Graham Rix, before departing the club in January 2006. MacFarlane made 95 appearances and scored one goal during his 3 1/2 years at Tynecastle.

=== Later career (2006–2011) ===
MacFarlane spent the second half of the 2005–06 season with Scottish Premier League club Aberdeen, before signing a two-year contract with First Division club Gretna in May 2006. Injuries restricted him to just eight appearances during the 2006–07 season, but he still received a First Division winners' medal. After his Gretna contract was terminated in May 2007, MacFarlane moved to First Division club Queen of the South on a two-year contract. He had two seasons as a mainstay of the Queens team, reaching the 2008 Scottish Cup Final and qualifying for the UEFA Cup, in which he had previously competed while a Heart of Midlothian player. MacFarlane wound down his career with spells at lower division clubs Greenock Morton, Airdrie United and Annan Athletic and retired in 2011.

== Managerial and coaching career ==
=== Early coaching roles ===
MacFarlane began his coaching career in 2012 and served as assistant to former Heart of Midlothian teammate Steven Pressley at Falkirk, Coventry City, Fleetwood Town and Pafos. In February and March 2015, he briefly held the role of caretaker manager at Coventry City, before leaving the club at the end of the 2014–15 season. MacFarlane joined Milton Keynes Dons as first team coach to manager Robbie Neilson in December 2016 and stayed in the role until Neilson's sacking in January 2018.

=== Kidderminster Harriers ===
On 25 May 2018, MacFarlane was announced as manager of National League North club Kidderminster Harriers. He had briefly coached at the club in 2015. Tasked with promotion, MacFarlane presided over 27 matches, winning 12, before he agreed to part ways with the club in January 2019.

=== Brentford ===
On 30 May 2019, MacFarlane joined Brentford as head coach of the club's B team. As a result of first team head coach Thomas Frank testing positive for COVID-19, MacFarlane presided over the first team's 2–1 FA Cup third round victory over Middlesbrough on 9 January 2021. He won competitive cup competitions in each of the 2021–22 and 2022–23 seasons, with the London Senior Cup and Premier League Cups respectively. The team entered the Professional Development League in 2024 and won the competition at the first attempt. In July 2025, after being awarded a UEFA Pro Licence, MacFarlane was promoted into the role of assistant first team coach.

=== Scotland U19 ===
In August 2024, MacFarlane was announced as head coach of the Scotland national under-19 team. He was replaced in the role by Tam Courts in September 2026, but remained within the national youth setup, coaching across all levels.

== Career statistics ==
Appearances and goals by club, season and competition
Club	Season	League			Scottish Cup		League Cup		Europe		Other		Total	
Club	Season	Division	Apps	Goals	Apps	Goals	Apps	Goals	Apps	Goals	Apps	Goals	Apps	Goals
Queen's Park	1999–00	Scottish Third Division	36	0	1	0	2	0	―		3 (Note: Appearances in Scottish Challenge Cup)	0	42	0
Kilmarnock	2000–01	Scottish Premier League	0	0	0	0	0	0	―		―		0	0
Queen's Park (loan)	2000–01	Scottish Second Division	8	0	0	0	―		―		―		8	0
Queen's Park (loan)	Total		44	0	1	0	2	0	―		3	0	50	0
Clyde (loan)	2000–01	Scottish First Division	7	0	―		―		―		―		7	0
Airdrieonians	2001–02	Scottish First Division	28	3	1	0	3	1	―		5	0	37	4
Heart of Midlothian	2002–03	Scottish Premier League	21	0	1	0	2	0	―		―		24	0
Heart of Midlothian	2003–04	Scottish Premier League	29	0	2	0	1	0	3 (Note: Appearances in UEFA Cup)	0	―		35	0
Heart of Midlothian	2004–05	Scottish Premier League	20	0	6	1	1	0	5	0	―		32	1
Heart of Midlothian	2005–06	Scottish Premier League	3	0	0	0	1	0	―		―		4	0
Heart of Midlothian	Total		73	0	9	1	5	0	8	0	―		95	1
Aberdeen	2005–06	Scottish Premier League	6	0	0	0	―		―		―		6	0
Gretna	2006–07	Scottish First Division	5	0	0	0	1	0	―		2	0	8	0
Queen of the South	2007–08	Scottish First Division	28	1	5	0	1	0	―		1	0	35	1
Queen of the South	2008–09	Scottish First Division	33	0	1	0	1	0	2	0	0	0	37	0
Queen of the South	Total		61	1	6	0	2	0	2	0	1	0	72	1
Greenock Morton	2009–10	Scottish First Division	16	0	1	0	2	1	―		2	0	21	1
Greenock Morton	2010–11	Scottish First Division	0	0	―		0	0	―		0	0	0	0
Greenock Morton	Total		16	0	1	0	2	1	―		2	0	21	1
Airdrie United	2010–11	Scottish Second Division	1	0	―		―		―		―		1	0
Annan Athletic	2010–11	Scottish Third Division	15	1	―		―		―		4 (Note: Appearances in Scottish Second Division play-offs)	0	19	1
Career total			256	5	18	1	15	2	10	0	17	0	316	8

== Managerial statistics ==
As of match played 31 March 2026

Managerial record by team and tenure
Team	Nat	From	To	Record					Ref
Team	Nat	From	To	G	W	D	L	Win %	Ref
Coventry City (caretaker)	(England)	23 February 2015	3 March 2015	2	1	0	1	50.00	
Kidderminster Harriers	(England)	25 May 2018	7 January 2019	27	12	6	9	44.44	
Scotland U19	(Scotland)	14 August 2024	13 September 2026	20	7	6	7	35.00	
Total				49	20	12	17	40.82	―

== Honours ==
=== Player ===
Queen's Park

- Scottish League Third Division: 1999–00

Airdrieonians

- Scottish Challenge Cup: 2001–02

Gretna

- Scottish League First Division: 2006–07

=== Manager ===
Brentford B

- London Senior Cup: 2021–22
- Premier League Cup: 2022–23
