= Mark Anthony Riley =

British nuclear physicist

Mark Riley
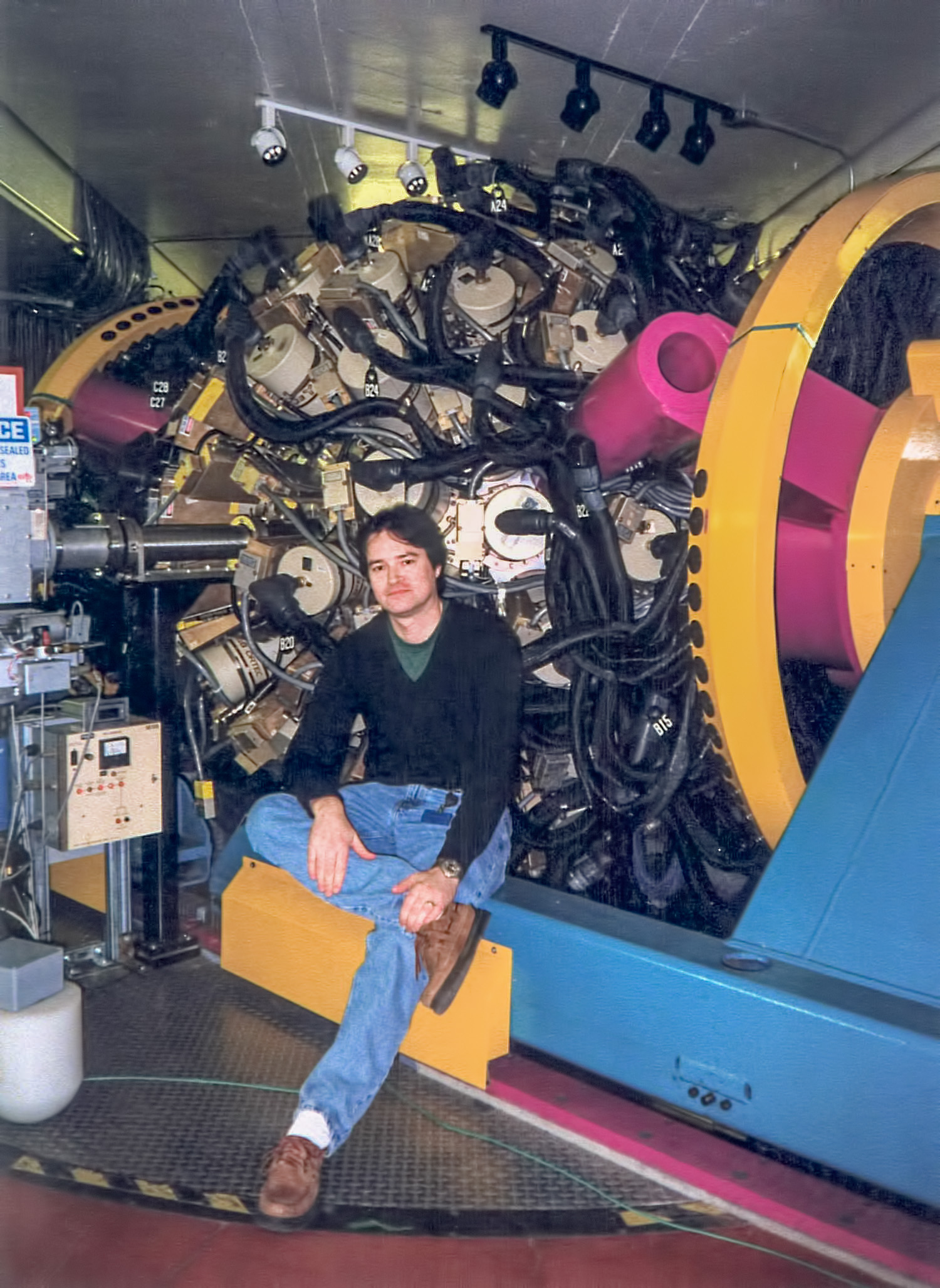
- British nuclear physicist Mark Riley with the Gammasphere, the world's most powerful gamma-ray spectrometer in 2001 at Lawrence Berkeley National Laboratory.
- Born: Mark Anthony Riley; 10 June 1959 (age 67)
- Scientific career
- Fields: Nuclear Physics
- Workplaces: Niels Bohr Institute; Oak Ridge National Laboratory; University of Tennessee; University of Liverpool; Florida State University

Mark Anthony Riley is a British nuclear physicist. He is known for his work in gamma spectroscopy.

Riley earned his bachelor's degree in physics and his doctorate in nuclear physics at the University of Liverpool. He completed postdoctoral research at the Niels Bohr Institute, Oak Ridge National Laboratory, and the University of Tennessee and held the SERC Advanced Fellowship at the University of Liverpool before joining the faculty of Florida State University in 1990. In 2000, Riley was elected a fellow of the American Physical Society, "for his many pioneering contributions to the exploration of atomic nuclei at high angular momentum values." The following year, Riley was appointed Raymond K. Sheline Professor of Physics in 2001, and in 2014 was named a Robert O. Lawton Distinguished Professor at Florida State University. He became interim dean of Florida State University's Graduate School in August 2017, and was formally elevated to the deanship in April 2018.

An invited Open Access comment to a special Physica Scripta Focus issue celebrating the 40 year anniversary of the 1975 Nobel Prize in Physics to Aage Bohr, Ben Roy Mottelson and Leo Rainwater edited by Jerzy Dudek, outlines selected highlights from experimental investigations at the Niels Bohr Institute, Denmark, and Daresbury Laboratory, UK, in the late 1970s and early 1980s, many of which have continued at other national laboratories in Europe and the US to the present day.

A 2022 Open Access article in Nuclear Physics News, co-authored with Ramon Wyss, commemorated the 50 year anniversary of the discovery of the 'backbending', or 'rotational alignment', effect in nuclear structure physics. Riley produced, with Akis Pipidis, a pedagogical movie illustrating a mechanical analogue of this phenomenon.
