= Ramon Wyss =

Swedish theoretical nuclear physicist

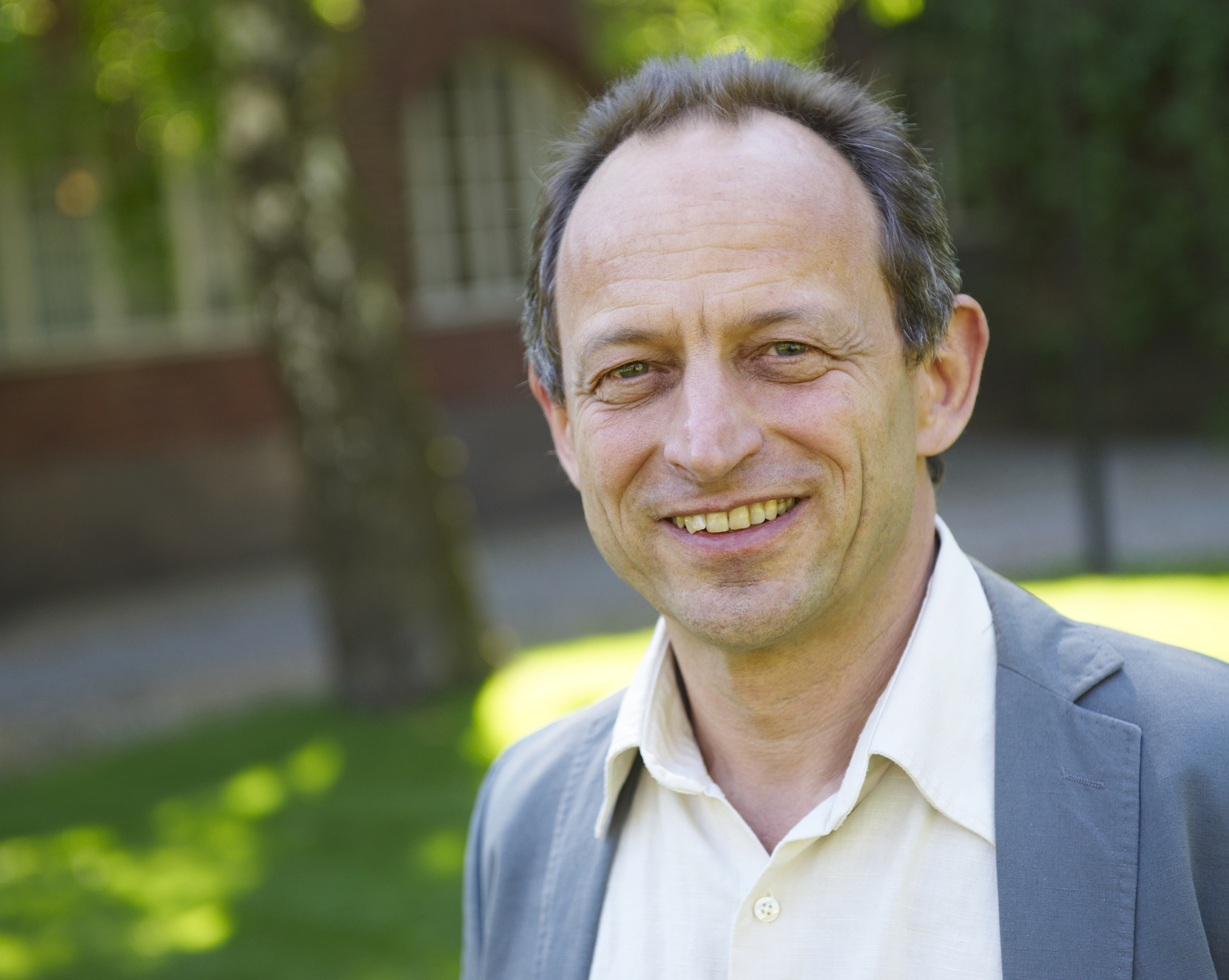
- Born: Ramon Alexander Wyss; 1 March 1952
- Known for: research on neutron-proton
- Scientific career
- Fields: Nuclear Structure Physics and Internationalization of higher education
- Workplaces: KTH Royal Institute of Technology; Peking University; Shanghai Jiao Tong University; Oak Ridge National Lab; Manne Siegbahn Laboratory

Ramon Alexander Wyss (born 1 March 1952) is a Swedish theoretical nuclear physicist. He is a professor emeritus at the KTH Royal Institute of Technology in Stockholm. He served as Vice President for International Affairs at KTH in between 2002 to 2016. He held professorships at Peking University and Shanghai Jiao Tong University.

His research focuses on nuclear structure physics, using simple theoretical models to elucidate complex experimental findings.

In 1995, he was awarded the Edlundska prize of the Royal Swedish Academy of Science.

== Early life and education ==
Ramon Wyss was born to Dieter Wyss and Ursula Wyss Daecke. He became a Swedish citizen in 1973 and earned his Teknologie doktor (PhD) in 1990, followed by a postdoc stay at the Joint Institute of Oak Ridge National Lab 1990-1992. He earned docent promotion in 1994 and in 2006 he was appointed professor of theoretical nuclear physics at KTH.

== Academic career ==
Wyss was appointed professor of theoretical nuclear physics at KTH in 2006.

From 2002 to 2016, Wyss served as Vice President of KTH in charge of international education and global partnerships.

After retiring from KTH, Wyss has worked on interdisciplinary projects linking physics and societal challenges. With Ayşe Ataç Nyberg, he co-founded the European ArtEmis Project in 2022, aimed at building a sensor network to improve earthquake forecasting.

He currently serves as chair of both the governing and science boards of the project. He was the interim director of the Center for New Energy Technology Oskarshamn (CNETO).

He was co-chair for the International advisory board of Beijing Jiaotong University and in 2021 he was appointed to the international advisory board of Shanghai Jiao Tong University.

In 2009, he was reappointed Vice-President for international projects at KTH.

Research and Opinions

Wyss's theoretical contributions in nuclear physics include simplified microscopic-macroscopic approaches and rotational models, notably in studies of backbending and high-spin band structures.

His research has centered on nuclear structure, including rotational motion, backbending phenomena, particle decay and the development of nuclear models linking experimental and theoretical approaches.

He co-authored research on neutron-proton pairing in nuclei and other mass systematics, reinforcing the effectiveness of accessible models in describing complex nuclear behaviors.

In Sweden, he engaged in the debate for nuclear power as an energy source reducing CO2 emission.

== Selected publications ==
- Qi, C.; Xu, F. R.; Liotta, R. J.; Wyss, R. (2009-08-13). "Universal Decay Law in Charged-Particle Emission and Exotic Cluster Radioactivity". Physical Review Letters. 103 (7) 072501. arXiv:0909.4492. Bibcode:2009PhRvL.103g2501Q. doi:10.1103/PhysRevLett.103.072501. ISSN 0031-9007. PMID 19792636.
- Andreyev, A. N.; Wyss, R.; Van Duppen P, null; Weissman, L.; Ackermann, D.; Gerl, J.; Hessberger, F. P.; Hofmann, S.; Kleinbohl, A.; Munzenberg, G.; Reshitko, S.; Schlegel, C.; Schaffner, H.; Cagarda, P.; Matos, M. (2000-05-25). "A triplet of differently shaped spin-zero states in the atomic nucleus 186Pb". Nature. 405 (6785): 430–433. doi:10.1038/35013012. ISSN 1476-4687. PMID 10839532.
- Wyss, R.; Nyberg, J.; Johnson, A.; Bengtsson, R.; Nazarewicz, W. (1988-12-15). "Highly deformed intruder bands in the A≈130 mass region". Physics Letters B. 215 (2): 211–217. Bibcode:1988PhLB..215..211W. doi:10.1016/0370-2693(88)91422-0. ISSN 0370-2693.
- Satuła, W.; Wyss, R. (1996-08-19), "Competition between T = 0 and T = 1 pairing in proton-rich nuclei", Physics Letters B, 393 (1–2): 1–6, arXiv:nucl-th/9608041, doi:10.1016/S0370-2693(96)01603-6, arXiv:nucl-th/9608041
- Xu, F.R.; Walker, P.M.; Sheikh, J.A.; Wyss, R. (1998). "Multi-quasiparticle potential-energy surfaces". Physics Letters B. 435 (3–4): 257–263. Bibcode:1998PhLB..435..257X. doi:10.1016/S0370-2693(98)00857-0.
- Satuła, W.; Wyss, R.; Magierski, P. (1994-10-03). "The Lipkin-Nogami formalism for the cranked mean field". Nuclear Physics A. 578 (1): 45–61. Bibcode:1994NuPhA.578...45S. doi:10.1016/0375-9474(94)90968-7. ISSN 0375-9474.
- Xu, F. R.; Zhao, E. G.; Wyss, R.; Walker, P. M. (2004-06-25). "Enhanced Stability of Superheavy Nuclei Due to High-Spin Isomerism". Physical Review Letters. 92 (25) 252501. arXiv:nucl-th/0404093. Bibcode:2004PhRvL..92y2501X. doi:10.1103/PhysRevLett.92.252501. ISSN 0031-9007. PMID 15244999.
- Wyss, R.; Granderath, A.; Bengtsson, R.; von Brentano, P.; Dewald, A.; Gelberg, A.; Gizon, A.; Gizon, J.; Harissopulos, S.; Johnson, A.; Lieberz, W.; Nazarewicz, W.; Nyberg, J.; Schiffer, K. (1989-12-11). "Interplay between proton and neutron S-bands in the Xe-Ba-Ce-region". Nuclear Physics A. 505 (2): 337–351. Bibcode:1989NuPhA.505..337W. doi:10.1016/0375-9474(89)90378-3. ISSN 0375-9474.
- Nazarewicz, W.; Wyss, R.; Johnson, A. (1989-10-23). "Structure of superdeformed bands in the A ≈ 150 mass region". Nuclear Physics A. 503 (2): 285–330. Bibcode:1989NuPhA.503..285N. doi:10.1016/0375-9474(89)90238-8. ISSN 0375-9474.
- Xu, F. R.; Satula, W.; Wyss, R. (1999-12-02), "Quadrupole pairing interaction and signature inversion", Nuclear Physics A, 669 (1–2): 119–134, arXiv:nucl-th/9912006, doi:10.1016/S0375-9474(99)00817-9, arXiv:nucl-th/9912006
- Satula, W.; Ćwiok, S.; Nazarewicz, W.; Wyss, R.; Johnson, A. (1991-07-08). "Structure of superdeformed states in AuRa nuclei". Nuclear Physics A. 529 (2): 289–314. Bibcode:1991NuPhA.529..289S. doi:10.1016/0375-9474(91)90797-A. ISSN 0375-9474.
- Wyss, R. A.; Johnson, A.; Nyberg, J.; Bengtsson, R.; Nazarewicz, W. (1988-06-01). "Competition between (h11/2)2 proton and neutron excitations around128Ba: Coexistence of near prolate and near oblate shapes at high spin". Zeitschrift für Physik A. 329 (2): 255–256. doi:10.1007/BF01283782. ISSN 0939-7922.
- Wyss, R.; Satuła, W.; Nazarewicz, W.; Johnson, A. (1990-05-07). "Competition between triaxial bands and highly deformed intruder bands around 180Os". Nuclear Physics A. 511 (2): 324–344. doi:10.1016/0375-9474(90)90163-G. ISSN 0375-9474.
