= Gary Tallon =

Irish footballer

Personal information
- Full name: Gerrit Thomas Tallon
- Date of birth: 5 September 1973 (age 53)
- Place of birth: Drogheda, Ireland
- Position: Midfielder

Senior career*
| Years | Team | Apps | (Gls) |
| 1995–1996 | Blackburn Rovers | 0 | (0) |
| 1996–1997 | Kilmarnock | 4 | (0) |
| 1997 | → Chester City (loan) | 1 | (0) |
| 1997–2000 | Mansfield Town | 76 | (2) |
- * Club domestic league appearances and goals

Gerrit Thomas "Gary" Tallon (born 5 September 1973) is an Irish former professional footballer who played in midfield, principally for Mansfield Town.

== Career ==
Born in Drogheda, he was a trainee at Blackburn Rovers. However, he failed to play a first team game for Blackburn and was released on a free transfer in 1996, moving to Scottish Premier Division side Kilmarnock. He made his debut for Kilmarnock on 10 August 1996 in a 2–1 victory against Hibernian. He played Kilmarnock's following two league games but had to wait until January for his fourth appearance in a 6–0 defeat to Celtic. It would be his last game for Kilmarnock. Instead, in March 1997, he moved on loan to English Division Three side Chester City, where he played one game.

In December 1997, he returned to England with Mansfield Town. He made his debut on 2 December in a 2–1 defeat to Torquay United and later the same season scored the first goal of his professional career as Mansfield defeated Peterborough United 2–0. He eventually played 86 games with Mansfield, scoring two goals, until he was forced to retire in July 2000 at the age of 26 because of injury.
