= Michael Jeffrey =

English footballer

Personal information
- Full name: Michael Richard Jeffrey
- Date of birth: 11 August 1971 (age 55)
- Place of birth: Liverpool, England
- Position: Striker

Senior career*
Years	Team	Apps	(Gls)
1989–1992	Bolton Wanderers	15	(0)
1992–1993	Doncaster Rovers	49	(19)
1993–1995	Newcastle United	2	(0)
1995	Rotherham United	22	(5)
1995–1999	Fortuna Sittard	103	(25)
1999–2000	Kilmarnock	19	(2)
2000–2002	Grimsby Town	47	(2)
2002	→ Scunthorpe United (loan)	6	(1)
Total		263	(54)
- * Club domestic league appearances and goals

Michael Richard Jeffrey (born 11 August 1971) is an English former professional footballer who played as a striker.

In a career lasted from 1989 to 2002, Jeffrey notably played in the top flight of English, Dutch and Scottish football with spells in the Premier League with Newcastle United, in the Eredivisie for Fortuna Sittard and in the Scottish Premier League for Kilmarnock. He has also played professionally in the Football League for Bolton Wanderers, Doncaster Rovers, Rotherham United, Grimsby Town and Scunthorpe United.

== Career ==
Jeffrey began his career with Bolton Wanderers in 1988, although it was a move to Doncaster Rovers in 1992 that kickstarted his career as he scored 19 goals in 42 league appearances. He joined Premier League side Newcastle United in October 1993, but under Kevin Keegan he would only make a total of five appearances in all competitions, with a solitary goal coming in a 1–1 League Cup draw against Manchester City on 30 November 1994.

In June 1995 he signed for Rotherham United for £100,000, scoring five goals from twenty appearances before he was subject to a bid from newly promoted Eredivise side Fortuna Sittard in December. He joined Fortuna for £225,000 only six months into his time at Rotherham. He scored 25 goals in 123 appearances over the next few seasons as Fortuna fended off relegation from the Dutch top flight.

In May 1999 he signed for Scottish Premier League side Kilmarnock but saw minimal action which lead him to sign for Grimsby Town the following summer. His time at Grimsby only yielded two league goals over several seasons and during the 2001–02 season he was loaned out to Scunthorpe United. Following his release by Grimsby in the summer of 2002, Jeffrey retired aged only 30 years old.

== Personal life ==
Since retiring from football in 2002, Jeffrey has resided in his native Liverpool and has worked as a car salesman.
