= Helmut Rahner =

German footballer

Personal information
- Date of birth: 29 March 1971 (age 55)
- Place of birth: Weingarts, Kunreuth, West Germany
- Height: 1.81 m (5 ft 11 in)
- Position: Defender

Youth career
- 1. FC Nürnberg

Senior career*
Years	Team	Apps	(Gls)
1990–1991	Blau-Weiß 90 Berlin	8	(0)
1991–1996	Bayer 05 Uerdingen	140	(2)
1997	Kilmarnock		
1997–1999	1. FC Nürnberg	36	(0)
1999	Reggiana		
1999–2000	Preußen Münster	20	(0)
2000–2002	Rot-Weiss Essen	13	(0)
- * Club domestic league appearances and goals

Helmut Rahner (born 29 March 1971) is a German former professional football who played as a defender. In his career, he played for Blau-Weiß 90 Berlin, Bayer Uerdingen, 1. FC Nürnberg and Rot-Weiss Essen.

== Career ==
Born in Weingarts (Kunreuth municipality), Rahner played youth football for 1. FC Nürnberg. He began playing senior football for Blau-Weiß 90 Berlin.

Rahner spent most of his career with Bayer 05 Uerdingen (later renamed KFC Uerdingen 05) playing in the Bundesliga. He also had brief spells in Scotland with Kilmarnock and Italy with A.C. Reggiana 1919.
