= Jérôme Vareille =

French footballer (born 1974)

Personal information
- Full name: Jérôme Vareille
- Date of birth: 1 June 1974 (age 52)
- Place of birth: Vernoux, France
- Height: 1.80 m (5 ft 11 in)
- Position: Forward

Senior career*
Years	Team	Apps	(Gls)
1991–1995	FC Metz	7	(1)
1995–1997	FC Mulhouse	78	(12)
1997–2002	Kilmarnock	94	(12)
2002	Airdrieonians	12	(2)
2002–2005	Airdrie United	89	(29)
2005–2008	Ayr United	82	(19)
2008	Bathgate Thistle		
2008–2011	Kilsyth Rangers		
Total		362	(75)
- * Club domestic league appearances and goals

Jérôme Vareille (born 1 June 1974) is a former French footballer who spent much of his playing career in Scotland.

== Career ==
Vareille began his career in his homeland with FC Metz before moving on to FC Mulhouse. Whilst playing for Mulhouse in a pre-season friendly against Kilmarnock F.C. Vareille scored two goals, convincing then Kille boss Bobby Williamson to sign him. Vareille spent over four seasons at the club and played 113 games (with 16 goals) in all competitions whilst at Rugby Park.

Vareille joined the doomed Airdrieonians late in the 2001–02 season, which was to be their last in existence. However, when Clydebank's league place was purchased by Jim Ballantyne for his new club Airdrie United, Vareille was contracted to this side. During his three seasons with the club he established a single season record goalscoring total, hitting 18 goals during the 2002–03 season and scored 4 goals in 14 minutes during a league game against Stenhousemuir in February 2004, setting a Scottish League record.

Vareille moved on to Ayr United in the close season of 2005 and remained at the club until the end of the 2007–08 season when he was released.

== Personal life ==
His daughter, Olivia, is a promising athlete and featured on Reporting Scotland.
