= Billy Findlay =

Scottish footballer

Personal information
- Full name: William Findlay
- Date of birth: 29 August 1970 (age 56)
- Place of birth: Kilmarnock, Scotland
- Position: Midfielder

Youth career
- Kilmarnock Boys Club

Senior career*
Years	Team	Apps	(Gls)
1987–1995	Hibernian	93	(7)
1995–1998	Kilmarnock	36	(1)
1998–1999	Ayr United	28	(3)
1999	Sligo Rovers	5	(0)
1999–2000	Queen of the South	7	(1)

International career
1990–1991	Scotland U21	6	(3)
- * Club domestic league appearances and goals

William Findlay (born 29 August 1970) is a Scottish former footballer who played as a midfielder. Findlay began his senior career with Hibernian, making just over 100 appearances for the Easter Road side before moving back to hometown club Kilmarnock in the mid-1990s. From there, Findlay spent a year with Ayrshire rivals Ayr United before a short spell with Queen of the South.

After leaving senior football, Findlay played for Maybole up until the mid-2000s.

Findlay is now active on the darts scene and indeed is deadly on the double 10, he also occasionally dabbles in emptying HGV's.
