= Martin O'Neill (footballer, born 1975) =

Scottish footballer (born 1975)

Personal information
- Date of birth: 17 June 1975 (age 51)
- Place of birth: Glasgow, Scotland
- Position: Defender

Youth career
- Clyde Boys Club

Senior career*
Years	Team	Apps	(Gls)
1993–1997	Clyde	82	(9)
1997–1999	Kilmarnock	2	(0)
1999	→ Stranraer (loan)	1	(0)
1999–2000	Clydebank	17	(0)
2000	Stirling Albion	3	(0)
2000–2001	East Fife	4	(0)
2001–2002	Dumbarton	45	(3)
- Auchinleck Talbot

International career
1995–1997	Scotland U21	4	(0)
- * Club domestic league appearances and goals

Martin O'Neill (born 17 June 1975) is a Scottish former professional footballer, who played for Clyde, Kilmarnock, Stranraer, Clydebank, Stirling Albion, East Fife and Dumbarton in the Scottish Football League.

He played for the Scotland U21 team at the Toulon Tournament in 1997. The team were beaten by Brazil in the semi-finals.

O'Neill later returned to Clyde in a non-playing capacity, working in a marketing role in May 2007.
