= Martin Baker (footballer) =

Scottish footballer

Personal information
- Date of birth: 8 June 1974 (age 52)
- Place of birth: Govan, Scotland
- Position: Left back

Senior career*
Years	Team	Apps	(Gls)
1991–1997	St Mirren	177	(4)
1997–2002	Kilmarnock	101	(0)
2002–2003	St Mirren	10	(0)
2003–2004	Pollok	17	(1)
2004–2006	Maryhill	55	(2)

International career
1992–1996	Scotland U21	12	(0)
- * Club domestic league appearances and goals

Martin Baker (born 8 June 1974) is a Scottish former footballer who played as a left back for St Mirren, Kilmarnock and Pollok.

During his time with Kilmarnock he was at the centre of controversy during which he was snubbed by manager Bobby Williamson to participate in the 2001 Scottish League Cup Final which Kilmarnock lost to Celtic three goals to nil thanks to a hat-trick from Henrik Larsson. He later went on to reveal that he was close to confronting and lashing out at Williamson.

He represented his country at the 1996 UEFA European Under-21 Football Championship where Scotland reached the semi-final stage before being knocked out by Spain.
