= Christophe Cocard =

French footballer (born 1967)

Personal information
- Full name: Christophe Bruno Tony Cocard
- Date of birth: 23 November 1967 (age 58)
- Place of birth: Bernay, France
- Height: 1.77 m (5 ft 10 in)
- Position: Midfielder

Youth career
- Évreux AC

Senior career*
Years	Team	Apps	(Gls)
1987–1996	Auxerre	260	(60)
1996–1999	Lyon	46	(9)
1999–2002	Kilmarnock	68	(13)
2002	Guang dong Hongyuan		

International career
1989–1995	France	9	(1)
- * Club domestic league appearances and goals

Christophe Bruno Tony Cocard (born 23 November 1967) is a French former professional footballer who played as a midfielder. He spent the majority of career at AJ Auxerre, while representing France at the Euro 1992.

He also represented Lyon, Kilmarnock in Scotland before a spell in China with Guangdong.

== Career statistics ==
=== International goal ===
Score and result list France's goal tally first, score column indicates score after Cocard goal.

International goal scored by Christophe Cocard
No.	Date	Venue	Opponent	Score	Result	Competition
1	6 September 1995	Stade de l'Abbé-Deschamps, Auxerre, France	Azerbaijan	10–0	10–0	UEFA Euro 1996 qualification

== Honours ==
Auxerre

- Division 1: 1995–96
- Coupe de France: 1993–94, 1995–96

Lyon

- UEFA Intertoto Cup: 1997
