= Jim Lauchlan =

Scottish footballer

Personal information
- Full name: James Harley Lauchlan
- Date of birth: 2 February 1977 (age 49)
- Place of birth: Glasgow, Scotland
- Height: 1.83 m (6 ft 0 in)
- Position: Defender

Senior career*
Years	Team	Apps	(Gls)
1994–2000	Kilmarnock	98	(3)
2000	→ Barnsley (loan)	0	(0)
2000–2003	Dundee United	96	(3)
2003–2004	Livingston	0	(0)
2004-2006	Ross County	89	(5)
2006–2008	Queen of the South	50	(1)
2008–2010	Dundee	54	(0)
2010	Sligo Rovers	20	(2)
2011	Ayr United	20	(1)
Total		442	(15)

International career
1998–1999	Scotland U21	15	(1)
- * Club domestic league appearances and goals

James Harley Lauchlan (born 2 February 1977 in Glasgow) is a Scottish footballer.

== Career ==
Lauchlan started his career with Kilmarnock making his first team debut age just 16 he went on to make 98 league appearances for the club. Following a loan spell with Barnsley in 2000, Lauchlan signed for Dundee United for a transfer fee of £100,000 where he played 96 league games over three years. In December 2003, he joined former United manager Alex Smith at Ross County, where 89 league matches brought five goals. In 2006-07, he signed for Queen of the South as player/coach and went on to make 50 appearances for the club scoring 1 goal. He then agreed terms with Dundee after being involved with their pre-season training camp in Malta going on to make 54 appearances for the club and winning the Scottish league challenge cup. Having been named as Dundee's player of the year for the 2009/10 season, he was released by the club on 4 May 2010 along with 8 other players.

In July 2010, Lauchlan signed for Sligo Rovers.A very successful 6 month period. He went on to make 20 appearances for the club scoring 2 goals going on to win the fai cup and fai league of Ireland cup.

In January 2011 Lauchlan went on to sign for Second Division Club Ayr United. During his time he made 20 appearances scoring 1 goal and gaining promotion back to the championship.

Lauchlan made 15 appearances as captain for the Scotland under-21 team in the late 1990s.

== Family ==
His younger brother Martin was also a professional footballer, with St Johnstone, Partick Thistle and Stenhousemuir.

== Personal life ==
As of 2022, Lauchlan worked as a Rigger.

== Honours ==
- Scottish League Challenge Cup Dundee 2009
- FAI Cup Sligo Rovers
- FAI League of Ireland Cup Sligo Rovers
