= Gary McCutcheon =

Scottish footballer

Personal information
- Full name: Gary Kyle McCutcheon
- Date of birth: 8 October 1978 (age 48)
- Place of birth: Dumfries, Scotland
- Position: Forward

Team information
- Current team: Stranraer (Reserve Team Manager)

Senior career*
Years	Team	Apps	(Gls)
1995–2003	Kilmarnock	15	(2)
1997	→ Stenhousemuir (loan)	20	(14)
2000	→ Clydebank (loan)	4	(0)
2000	→ Portadown (loan)	27	(23)
2002–2003	Dumbarton	30	(16)
2003–2004	Berwick Rangers	34	(14)
2004–2005	Stranraer	15	(3)
2005–2006	Larne	29	(23)
2006–2010	Portadown	126	(95)
2010–2012	Ballymena United	76	(49)
2012–2015	Crusaders	72	(36)
2015	Ballymena United	5	(2)
Total		453	(277)
- * Club domestic league appearances and goals

Gary McCutcheon (born 8 October 1978) is a Scottish former professional footballer who is the Reserve Team Manager at Stranraer.

He began his career at Kilmarnock where he had spells on loan at Stenhousemuir and Clydebank.

McCutcheon joined Carlisle United on trial during the Summer of 2002, scoring twice in a 3:0 victory against Penrith A.F.C., but failed to secure a permanent move.

He joined Larne in the Irish League in 2006. He has played in Northern Ireland ever since, moving to Portadown in 2007, Ballymena United in 2010 and Crusaders in 2012. While at Portadown, he won the Irish League Cup in 2008–09.

He was named Ulster Footballer of the Year for 2011–12.

McCutcheon scored his first goal for Crusaders on 27 August 2012, a penalty against Glebe Rangers in the League Cup. He scored his first league goal, also a penalty, in a 2–1 victory over Linfield at Windsor Park on 4 September. He scored a total of 22 goals in his first season with the Hatchetmen.
