= John Henry (footballer) =

Scottish footballer

Personal information
- Date of birth: 31 December 1971 (age 54)
- Place of birth: Vale of Leven, Scotland
- Position: Midfielder

Youth career
- Clydebank Boys Club

Senior career*
Years	Team	Apps	(Gls)
1990–1994	Clydebank	114	(28)
1994–1999	Kilmarnock	120	(12)
1999	→ Falkirk (loan)	12	(5)
1999–2001	Falkirk	58	(11)
2001–2002	Airdrieonians	22	(0)
2002–2005	Falkirk	41	(10)
2005–2006	St Johnstone	24	(0)
2006–2007	Queen of the South	4	(0)
2007	Dumbarton	5	(1)
Total		400	(67)

International career
1992	Scotland U21	1	(0)

Managerial career
- 2010–2012: Bolton Wanderers Reserves
- * Club domestic league appearances and goals

John Henry (born 31 December 1971) is a Scottish former footballer. During his career, Henry played for Clydebank, Kilmarnock, Falkirk, Airdrie, St Johnstone, Queen of the South and Dumbarton.

John Henry’s ultimate career highlight at Kilmarnock was winning the 1996–97 Scottish Cup, which culminated in a historic 1–0 victory over Falkirk in the final at Ibrox. This triumph marked Kilmarnock’s first major trophy in 32 years. [1]

While Henry struggled with fitness just before the final and had to settle for a place on the substitutes' bench, his contributions earlier in the tournament were indispensable to the club's success. [1, 2]

His defining individual moment during that iconic cup run occurred on in the quarter-finals against Greenock Morton. Playing at Cappielow, Henry put on a masterclass performance, scoring a hat trick to power Kilmarnock to a thrilling 5–2 victory. [1, 2]

Henry was capped once for the Scotland under-21 national football team in 1992 while playing for Clydebank. He also received recognition at the senior international level when he was named as part of the Scotland B squad on 21 February 1995, remaining on the bench as an unused substitute during a 3–0 victory over Northern Ireland B at Easter Road.

After retiring as a player, Henry joined the coaching staff of Partick Thistle, Burnley and Blackburn Rovers.

From 2010 he was the reserve team coach at Bolton Wanderers, but left the club shortly after the dismissal of Owen Coyle in October 2012. He subsequently followed Coyle to Wigan Athletic in 2013, undertaking a similar role to that of his Burnley and Bolton days. In January 2015 Henry was appointed assistant manager, working with Ian McCall, at Scottish League One club Ayr United.

In August 2016 Henry left his role with Ayr to once against work alongside Owen Coyle, this time at Blackburn Rovers as first team coach.

John achieved cult hero status after featuring in the book 'We need to talk about Kevin Bridges'.
