= Kevin McGowne =

Scottish footballer

Personal information
- Date of birth: 16 December 1969 (age 56)
- Place of birth: Kilmarnock, Scotland
- Position: Defender

Senior career*
Years	Team	Apps	(Gls)
1991–1992	St Mirren	48	(1)
1992–1996	St Johnstone	122	(3)
1996–2002	Kilmarnock	138	(6)
2002–2003	Dundee United	12	(0)
2003	Partick Thistle	7	(0)
2003–2007	St Mirren	112	(2)
2007–2008	Montrose	3	(0)
Total		442	(12)

Managerial career
- 2007–2008: Montrose (assistant)
- 2009–2010: Arbroath (assistant)
- 2010–2012: Brechin City (assistant)
- 2023–2025: Kinross Colts (Youth)
- * Club domestic league appearances and goals

Kevin "Big Kev" McGowne (born 16 December 1969 in Kilmarnock) is a Scottish former professional footballer.

McGowne began his career as a defender at St Mirren in 1991. The next year, he joined St Johnstone, where he spent four seasons before being signed to Kilmarnock by Alex Totten.

He spent six seasons with Kilmarnock, helping them to win the 1997 Scottish Cup over Falkirk. He joined Dundee United for one season in 2002, making 12 league appearances.

In 2003, he spent a short amount of time with Partick Thistle before rejoining St Mirren. He helped St Mirren return to the Scottish Premier League by earning promotion in the 2005–06 season and to win the 2005 Scottish Challenge Cup final against Hamilton Academical. He left St Mirren in July 2007 after helping the club maintain their SPL status in the 2006–07 season.

He went on to join Montrose as an assistant manager to Jim Weir for the 2007–08 season. He moved with Weir to Arbroath for the 2009–10 season and went to Brechin City in May 2010.
