= Mark Reilly =

Scottish footballer

Personal information
- Full name: Mark Francis Reilly
- Date of birth: 30 March 1969 (age 57)
- Place of birth: Bellshill, Scotland
- Height: 1.73 m (5 ft 8 in)
- Position: Midfielder

Senior career*
Years	Team	Apps	(Gls)
1988–1991	Motherwell	4	(0)
1991–1998	Kilmarnock	205	(8)
1998	Reading	6	(0)
1998–2002	Kilmarnock	62	(3)
2002	→ Airdrieonians (loan)	6	(0)
2002–2004	St Johnstone	59	(2)
2004–2006	St Mirren	49	(1)
Total		391	(14)

International career
1998	Scotland B	1	(0)
- * Club domestic league appearances and goals

Mark Francis "Mavis" Reilly (born 30 March 1969) is a Scottish former professional footballer, who played in over 250 league matches for Kilmarnock. He was part of the side that won the 1997 Scottish Cup Final.

Reilly began his career at Motherwell in 1988 and joined Kilmarnock in 1991. He spent eleven years at Kilmarnock, punctuated by a short spell at Reading in 1998, and was a member of the cup winning team of 1997. His first team chances were limited in the 2001–02 season and following a loan spell with Airdrieonians, he was released by Kilmarnock in April 2002. Two months later, he joined St Johnstone, where he linked up with former teammate and manager, Billy Stark. Reilly and St Johnstone teammate Mixu Paatelainen joined St Mirren in June 2004. He scored his first and only goal for the club in a 3-0 win over Queen of the South in April 2005. He helped St Mirren win the First Division title in the 2005–06 season and played as a substitute as they won the 2005 Scottish Challenge Cup Final, before retiring from professional football at the end of the season.

== Honours ==
- Kilmarnock Hall of Fame
