= Alex Burke =

Scottish footballer (born 1977)

Personal information
- Full name: Alexander Burke
- Date of birth: 11 November 1977 (age 48)
- Place of birth: Glasgow, Scotland
- Position: Centre midfielder

Senior career*
Years	Team	Apps	(Gls)
1995–2000	Kilmarnock	51	(5)
2000	→ Clydebank (loan)	5	(3)
2000–2001	Falkirk	11	(0)
2001–2002	Clydebank	37	(14)
2002–2003	Berwick Rangers	36	(11)
2003–2004	Queen of the South	33	(13)
2004–2006	Ross County	61	(10)
2006–2008	St Mirren	23	(0)
2008	→ Dunfermline Athletic (loan)	13	(1)
2008–2011	Dunfermline Athletic	67	(2)
2011–2012	Ayr United	3	(0)
Total		340	(59)

International career
1997–1998	Scotland U21	4	(0)
- * Club domestic league appearances and goals as of 15:23, 16 May 2017 (UTC)

Alex Burke (born 11 November 1977) is a Scottish former professional footballer who played as a midfielder. Burke, who started his career with Kilmarnock, also played with Falkirk, Clydebank, Berwick Rangers, Queen of the South, Ross County, St Mirren, Dunfermline Athletic, and Ayr United, as well as short loan spells with Clydebank and Dunfermline Athletic.

== Career ==
Burke started his playing career at Kilmarnock under then manager Alex Totten. After a loan spell at Clydebank in 2000, Burke signed for First Division side Falkirk, again playing under Alex Totten. After just one season, Burke signed for Clydebank, whom he had been on loan at the year before.

Over the next four years, Burke had successful spells at Berwick Rangers, Queen of the South and Ross County, before signing for Paisley side St Mirren in 2006.

In February 2008, Burke moved on loan to First Division side Dunfermline Athletic until the end of the season. After only playing four matches for the Pars, Jim McIntyre confirmed that Burke had signed a two-year deal with the club.

After his released from Dunfermline, he joined Ayr United following a successful trial period. Burke made just three league appearances, six in total, before being let go by the South Ayrshire club in January 2012.
