= Bobby Williamson =

Scottish footballer & manager (born 1961)

Personal information
- Full name: Robert Williamson
- Date of birth: 13 August 1961 (age 65)
- Place of birth: Glasgow, Scotland
- Height: 5 ft 10 in (1.78 m)
- Position: Striker

Senior career*
Years	Team	Apps	(Gls)
1980–1983	Clydebank	70	(28)
1983–1986	Rangers	41	(12)
1986–1988	West Bromwich Albion	53	(11)
1988–1990	Rotherham United	93	(49)
1990–1995	Kilmarnock	145	(38)
Total		402	(138)

Managerial career
- 1996–2002: Kilmarnock
- 2002–2004: Hibernian
- 2004–2005: Plymouth Argyle
- 2007–2008: Chester City
- 2008–2013: Uganda
- 2013–2014: Gor Mahia
- 2014–2016: Kenya
- * Club domestic league appearances and goals

Robert Williamson (born 13 August 1961) is a Scottish football player and manager.

Williamson played as a striker for Clydebank, Rangers, West Bromwich Albion, Rotherham United and Kilmarnock. He then became manager of Kilmarnock, winning the 1996–97 Scottish Cup. Williamson moved to Hibernian in 2002, but had less success there and left in 2004 to manage Plymouth Argyle. He was sacked by Argyle after just over a year in charge. After a short stint with Chester City, Williamson became manager of the Uganda national football team. After a spell with Kenyan Premier League club Gor Mahia during which he won the league title, Williamson was appointed as the manager of Kenya national football team.

== Playing career ==
As a player, Williamson was a striker. He began his career at Clydebank and scored 35 goals in 85 matches. Williamson earned a £100,000 move to Rangers during the 1983–84 season. Five months after signing for Rangers, Williamson broke his right leg while on a night out during an end of season tour of Australia. The injury was initially expected to keep him out of action for two or three months, but Williamson did not return to full training until December 1984. After an injury-hit spell with Rangers, Williamson moved to West Bromwich Albion in 1986, in part-exchange for Jimmy Nicholl. Williamson also played in the Football League for Rotherham United. He returned to Scotland in 1990 to join Kilmarnock, which proved to be his last club as a player.

== Managerial career ==
=== Kilmarnock ===
Williamson became the manager of Kilmarnock following the departure of Alex Totten. In his first season as manager, the club won the 1997 Scottish Cup final by beating Falkirk 1–0 at Ibrox. Kilmarnock finished highly in the Scottish Premier League and he guided them into Europe, playing a total of four two-legged ties over three seasons. He also attracted high-profile players including former Scotland internationals Ally McCoist and Ian Durrant, and the former French international Christophe Cocard.

=== Hibernian ===
Williamson took up a new challenge at Hibernian in February 2002, where he inherited a team that had gone 18 league games without a win. A win against St Johnstone in Williamson's first match in charge effectively removed the danger of relegation. Due to financial problems at the club, Williamson had to move on several senior players, but he did not endear himself to the Hibs fans. He lightheartedly joked about this relationship by referring to himself as a "weegie hun". Nonetheless, Hibs produced several excellent young players, including Scott Brown, Derek Riordan, Garry O'Connor, Kevin Thomson and Steven Whittaker. Williamson guided his young team to the 2004 Scottish League Cup final, but they were beaten 2–0 by Livingston.

=== Plymouth ===
Williamson moved to Plymouth Argyle on 20 April 2004. By winning his first match in charge, the club won promotion to the Football League Championship. After keeping the Pilgrims in the division in his first full campaign, a poor run of results at the start of the 2005–06 season led to his dismissal on 6 September 2005. Financial constraints at Plymouth Argyle resulted in a number of signings which contributed to his demise, most notably Taribo West. He was replaced by Tony Pulis, who had recently been sacked by fellow Championship side Stoke City.

=== Chester ===
Williamson appeared as a pundit on BBC Radio Scotland's Sportsound before he was appointed as Chester City manager on 11 May 2007. Williamson's first Football League match in charge of Chester ended in a 0–0 draw with Chesterfield on 11 August 2007 and has established them as a promotion contender in the opening months of the season. After mid-season, Chester's form began to drop rapidly, winning only 1 out of 14 games since Boxing Day; Williamson was sacked on 2 March 2008.

=== Uganda ===
On 19 August 2008, Williamson was appointed by FUFA to be the coach of the Uganda national football team. Williamson replaced Csaba László, who resigned in July 2008 to join Scottish Premier League side Hearts. Within days of being appointed, Williamson was given the ultimatum of winning his first two games against Niger and Benin to earn a longer contract. He succeeded in doing that, and their FIFA World Ranking steadily improved during his first two years in charge. Williamson led his Uganda team to the 2011 CECAFA Cup.

Uganda almost qualified for the 2013 Africa Cup of Nations, losing on a penalty shootout in their qualifying playoff tie against Zambia. Uganda had a bad start to 2014 World Cup qualifying, taking just two points from three games. It was announced on 8 April 2013 that Williamson had been sacked by Uganda.

=== Gor Mahia ===
On 5 July 2013, it was announced that Williamson agreed terms with Kenyan Premier League side Gor Mahia to join the club as their new head coach. He replaced Croatian counterpart Zdravko Logarusić, who was sacked by the club 9 days earlier, on 25 June. Williamson led Gor Mahia to their first national league championship in 18 years.

=== Kenya ===
In August 2014, Williamson was appointed manager of the Kenya national team. He took over the post after his last game with Gor Mahia in a league game against Sony Sugar on 24 August. He was replaced by ex-Mathare United manager Stanley Okumbi in February 2016.

== Honours ==
=== Player ===
Rotherham United

- Football League Fourth Division: 1988–89

Kilmarnock

- Scottish First Division promotion: 1992–93

Individual

- PFA Team of the Year: 1989–90 Third Division

=== Manager ===
Kilmarnock

- Scottish Cup: 1996–97
- Ayrshire Cup: 1998
- Scottish League Cup runner-up: 2000–01

Hibernian

- Scottish League Cup runner-up: 2003–04

Plymouth Argyle

- Football League Second Division: 2003–04

Uganda

- CECAFA Cup: 2008, 2009, 2011, 2012

Gor Mahia

- Kenyan Premier League: 2013
- President's Cup runner-up: 2013
- Kenyan Super Cup runner-up: 2013

== Personal life ==
Since retiring, Williamson lives in Kenya with his wife, Michelle, and their daughter.

He was diagnosed with cancer of the nasal passages in the summer of 2017. As of July 2018 Williamson is in remission.
