= Gary Holt (footballer) =

Scottish footballer and coach

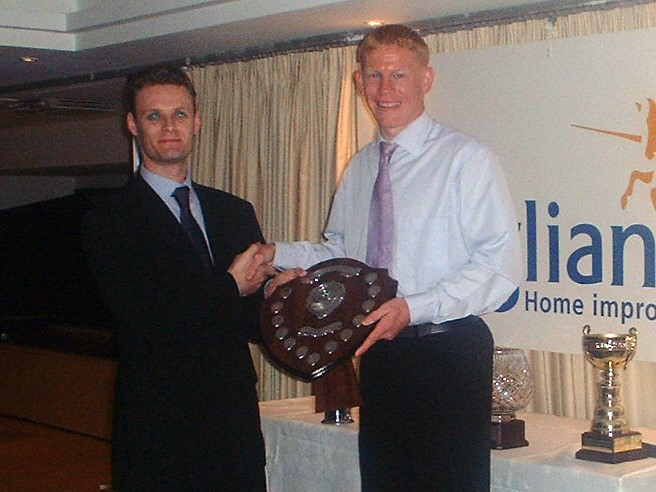
- Holt (right) pictured in 2007

Personal information
- Full name: Gary Holt
- Date of birth: 9 March 1973 (age 53)
- Place of birth: Irvine, Scotland
- Height: 6 ft 0 in (1.83 m)
- Position: Midfielder

Youth career
- 1992–1994: Celtic

Senior career*
Years	Team	Apps	(Gls)
1994–1995	Stoke City	0	(0)
1995–2001	Kilmarnock	152	(9)
2001–2005	Norwich City	168	(3)
2005–2007	Nottingham Forest	65	(1)
2007–2009	Wycombe Wanderers	76	(3)
2009	Colchester United	0	(0)
2009–2010	Lowestoft Town	22	(4)
Total		483	(20)

International career
2000–2004	Scotland	10	(1)

Managerial career
- 2013–2014: Falkirk
- 2018–2020: Livingston
- 2021: Falkirk (interim)
- 2025–: Partick Thistle Women
- * Club domestic league appearances and goals

Gary James Holt (born 9 March 1973) is a Scottish football player and coach, who is currently the manager of Partick Thistle Women. Holt first played competitively for Kilmarnock, making 138 appearances, before transferring to Norwich City, where he made 168 appearances. During his time with Kilmarnock and Norwich he also received ten caps for the Scotland national football team, scoring one goal. Later in his career, Holt also played for Nottingham Forest, Wycombe Wanderers, Colchester United and Lowestoft Town.

His playing style was marked by his energy and stamina. "Others were blessed with greater talent, but Holt could always out-beat their heart. And run. Boy, could he run." As a result of this, Norwich City fans nicknamed him 'Three Lungs'. coincidentally, in 2004, he required hospital treatment for a collapsed lung.

After his retirement from playing football, Holt joined the Norwich City Academy. He then managed Falkirk for just over a year until June 2014, when he returned to Norwich as a first-team coach. Holt was then head coach of Scottish Premiership club Livingston for over two years, until his resignation in November 2020. In January 2021, Holt returned to Falkirk as sporting director, but was sacked 12 months later.

== Playing career ==
Holt came late to professional football, having had a spell in the Army Catering Corps as a chef and played for the British Army team. His professional career began when he joined Celtic but did not play for the first team and moved on to Stoke City.

=== Kilmarnock ===
Holt signed for his boyhood favourites, Kilmarnock, in 1995. He excelled in the Ayrshire team's most consistent period of success since the 1960s.

=== Norwich City ===
In 2001, Norwich City paid £135,000 for Holt. He was voted Norwich City player of the year in 2001–02, when he also collected a number of fans' awards, including the Capital Canaries Player of the Season trophy. That season, Holt was a member of the Norwich team that reached the final of the Division One play-offs, losing on penalties to Birmingham City Holt played in Division One for his first three seasons with the club and helped them win promotion to the Premier League in 2004.

=== Nottingham Forest ===
Holt left Norwich to join Nottingham Forest in 2005, where he spent two years before being released at the end of the 2006–07 season. At Forest he scored three times, with goals against Weymouth in the FA Cup, Cheltenham in the league and Yeovil in the second leg of the 2007 League One play off semi final.

=== Later career ===
He subsequently signed for League Two side Wycombe Wanderers on 12 July 2007. He signed a one-year extension until July 2010 on 17 January 2009. On 28 March 2009, he lobbed Luke Daniels in the League Two match against Shrewsbury Town to score the third goal of his Wycombe Wanderers career.

For the 2009–10 season he left Wycombe to join former manager Paul Lambert at Colchester United as a player coach. However, when Lambert left for Norwich City after only three game of the season, his contract was terminated without him making a single appearance for the club. On 6 October 2009, he signed for Isthmian League club Lowestoft Town.

=== International career ===
Despite his excellent form with Kilmarnock, international recognition with Scotland initially proved elusive for Holt, who briefly explored the option of playing for Canada in 1998 and for Northern Ireland in 1999; however, it emerged that he was not eligible for either. Holt made his Scotland debut on 2 September 2000 as an 89th-minute substitute against Latvia, in a match that Scotland won 1–0. He made ten appearances in total, with his final cap coming in a 1–1 draw against Moldova in October 2004. His only international goal came in a 4–1 win against Trinidad and Tobago in May 2004.

== Coaching career ==
In July 2010, he returned to Norwich City as assistant Academy manager. He was responsible for the coaching of City's under-12 to under-16 age groups as well as assisting the current coaching staff with reserve team matters.

=== Falkirk manager ===
Holt was appointed manager of Scottish First Division club Falkirk on 3 April 2013. Holt credited former Norwich City manager and compatriot, Paul Lambert for helping him. Holt left Falkirk in June 2014 to take a first-team coaching position at Norwich City, where he stayed for two years.

=== Livingston ===
In August 2018, he was appointed head coach of Scottish Premiership club Livingston, replacing former Scotland teammate Kenny Miller in the role. He won the Premiership manager of the month award for September 2018 and guided the relegation favourites to a ninth-place finish on their return to the Premiership.

Holt was forced to take a temporary leave of absence from his role in August 2019 when he overexerted in a gym session and contracted rhabdomyolysis, causing his blood levels to rise to dangerous levels and his skeletal muscle to begin breaking down. The 2019–20 season provided further success for Holt and Livingston, as the Lions finished in fifth place. It was the club's second-highest ever league finish, and Holt won the Premiership manager of the month award for January 2020 and was nominated for the Scottish Football Writers' Association 'Manager of the Year Award'.

After a bad start to the 2020–21 season, Holt resigned on 26 November.

=== Falkirk sporting director ===
Holt returned to Falkirk in January 2021 as their sporting director. He became interim manager in April 2021 after the departures of David McCracken and Lee Miller. He was sacked from this role one year later in January 2022.

=== Partick Thistle Women ===
In November 2025, Holt was appointed the new manager of Partick Thistle Women.

== Career statistics ==
=== Club ===
Appearances and goals by club, season and competition
Club	Season	League			National cup		League cup		Other		Total	
Club	Season	Division	Apps	Goals	Apps	Goals	Apps	Goals	Apps	Goals	Apps	Goals
Stoke City	1994–95	First Division	0	0	0	0	0	0	0	0	0	0
Kilmarnock	1995–96	Scottish Premier Division	26	0	2	0	1	0	0	0	29	0
Kilmarnock	1996–97	Scottish Premier Division	12	1	1	0	0	0	0	0	13	1
Kilmarnock	1997–98	Scottish Premier Division	27	2	2	0	0	0	0	0	29	2
Kilmarnock	1998–99	Scottish Premier League	33	3	1	0	2	0	4	0	40	3
Kilmarnock	1999–2000	Scottish Premier League	35	0	2	0	3	0	4	0	44	0
Kilmarnock	2000–01	Scottish Premier League	19	3	4	0	5	0	0	0	28	3
Kilmarnock	Total		152	9	12	0	11	0	8	0	183	9
Norwich City	2000–01	First Division	4	0	0	0	0	0	0	0	4	0
Norwich City	2001–02	First Division	46	2	2	0	1	0	3	0	52	2
Norwich City	2002–03	First Division	45	0	3	0	1	0	0	0	49	0
Norwich City	2003–04	First Division	46	1	1	0	1	0	0	0	48	1
Norwich City	2004–05	Premier League	27	0	0	0	2	0	0	0	29	0
Norwich City	Total		168	3	6	0	5	0	3	0	182	3
Nottingham Forest	2005–06	League One	26	0	3	1	1	0	1	0	31	1
Nottingham Forest	2006–07	League One	39	1	5	0	1	0	3	1	48	2
Nottingham Forest	Total		65	1	8	1	2	0	4	1	79	3
Wycombe Wanderers	2007–08	League Two	43	2	1	0	0	0	2	0	46	2
Wycombe Wanderers	2008–09	League Two	33	1	2	0	0	0	0	0	35	1
Wycombe Wanderers	Total		76	3	3	0	0	0	2	0	81	3
Colchester United	2009–10	League One	0	0	0	0	0	0	0	0	0	0
Career total			461	16	29	1	18	0	17	1	525	18

=== International ===
Appearances and goals by national team and year
National team	Year	Apps	Goals
Scotland	2000	2	0
Scotland	2001	—	
Scotland	2002	1	0
Scotland	2003	—	
Scotland	2004	7	1
Total		10	1

Score and result list Scotland's goal tally first, score column indicates score after Holt goal.

International goal scored by Gary Holt
No.	Date	Venue	Opponent	Score	Result	Competition
1	30 May 2004	Easter Road, Edinburgh, Scotland	Trinidad and Tobago	2–0	4–1	Friendly

== Managerial record ==
As of matches played on 24 May 2026

Team	Nat	From	To	Record				
Team	Nat	From	To	G	W	D	L	Win %
Falkirk	(Scotland)	3 April 2013	2 June 2014	52	25	11	16	48.08
Livingston	(Scotland)	23 August 2018	26 November 2020	94	33	23	38	35.11
Falkirk (interim)	(Scotland)	21 April 2021	4 May 2021	4	0	1	3	0.00
Partick Thistle Women	(Scotland)	11 November 2025	Present	21	6	2	13	28.57
Total				171	64	37	70	37.43

== Honours ==
Kilmarnock

- Scottish Cup: 1996–97

Norwich City

- Football League First Division: 2003–04

Lowestoft Town

- Isthmian League Division One North: 2009–10

Individual

- Norwich City Player of the Year: 2002
