= List of winners of the Scottish League One and predecessors =

A national third tier of Scottish league football was first established in the 1923–24 season as Division Three, but it only lasted for two full seasons due to the costs of meeting match guarantees and travel and other expenses being beyond most member clubs' capacity to pay.

As a result, the third-tier league was dissolved, and would not be re-established until 1946–47 with the C Division, which also included reserve teams of the clubs from the divisions above. Division C operated as a national competition for the first three seasons; thereafter, it was split into two regional sections until season 1954–55, when the third tier was again dissolved.

The third tier was re-established in 1975–76 season, when a division known as the Second Division was set up. Its status within the Scottish football league system league system changed in season 1998–99, when clubs from the top tier (Premier Division) broke away from the Scottish Football League to form the Scottish Premier League. The Second Division was still the third tier of the Scottish league system, but became the second level of the Scottish Football League rather than the third. In 2013, the Scottish Premier League and Scottish Football League merged to form the Scottish Professional Football League, with the third tier becoming known as the Scottish League One.

== Scottish Football League Division Three (1923–1926) ==
Season	Winner	Runner-up
1923–24	Arthurlie	East Stirlingshire
1924–25	Nithsdale Wanderers	Queen of the South
1925–26	Championship withheld^{[A]}	
1926–1946	No third tier	

^{A} Helensburgh had the most points, whereas Leith Athletic had a better points to match ratio.

== Scottish Football League Division C (1946–1955) ==
Season	Section	Winner	Runner-up
1946–47	—	Stirling Albion	Dundee 'A'
1947–48	—	East Stirlingshire	East Fife 'A'
1948–49	—	Forfar Athletic	Leith Athletic
1949–50	South-East	Hibernian 'A'	Heart of Midlothian 'A'
1949–50	South-West	Clyde 'A'	Rangers 'A'
1950–51	North-East	Heart of Midlothian 'A'	Aberdeen 'A'
1950–51	South-West	Clyde 'A'	Ayr United 'A'
1951–52	North-East	Dundee 'A'	Heart of Midlothian 'A'
1951–52	South-West	Rangers 'A'	Morton 'A'
1952–53	North-East	Aberdeen 'A'	Hibernian 'A'
1952–53	South-West	Rangers 'A' (2)	Partick Thistle 'A'
1953–54	North-East	Brechin City	Aberdeen 'A'
1953–54	South-West	Rangers 'A' (3)	Partick Thistle 'A'
1954–55	North-East	Aberdeen 'A' (2)	Hibernian 'A'
1954–55	South-West	Partick Thistle 'A'	Rangers 'A'
1955–1975	No third tier		

== Scottish Football League Second Division (1975–2013) ==
Season	Winner	Runner-up	Top scorer	
Season	Winner	Runner-up	Player	Goals
1975–76	Clydebank	Raith Rovers	Mickey Lawson (Stirling Albion)	18
1976–77	Stirling Albion (2)	Alloa Athletic	Derek Frye (Stranraer)	24
1977–78	Clyde	Raith Rovers	Derek Frye (Stranraer)	27
1978–79	Berwick Rangers	Dunfermline Athletic	Bruce Cleland (Albion Rovers)	24
1979–80	Falkirk	East Stirlingshire	Ian Campbell (Brechin City)	25
1980–81	Queen's Park	Queen of the South	Steve Hancock (Stenhousemuir)	20
1981–82	Clyde (2)	Alloa Athletic	Danny Masterton (Clyde)	23
1982–83	Brechin City (2)	Meadowbank Thistle	Rowan Alexander (Queen of the South); Ian Campbell (Brechin City)	23
1983–84	Forfar Athletic (2)	East Fife	Jim Liddle (Forfar Athletic)	22
1984–85	Montrose	Alloa Athletic	Bernie Slaven (Albion Rovers)	27
1985–86	Dunfermline Athletic	Queen of the South	Paul Smith (Raith Rovers); Keith Wright (Raith Rovers)	21
1986–87	Meadowbank Thistle	Raith Rovers	John Sludden (Ayr United)	26
1987–88	Ayr United	St Johnstone	John Sludden (Ayr United)	31
1988–89	Albion Rovers	Alloa Athletic	Charlie Lytwyn (Alloa Athletic)	23
1989–90	Brechin City (3)	Kilmarnock	Willie Watters (Kilmarnock)	23
1990–91	Stirling Albion (3)	Montrose	Mike Hendry (Queen's Park)	17
1991–92	Dumbarton	Cowdenbeath	Andy Thomson (Queen of the South)	26
1992–93	Clyde (3)	Brechin City	Miller Mathieson (Stenhousemuir)	26
1993–94	Stranraer	Berwick Rangers	Andy Thomson (Queen of the South)	29
1994–95	Morton	Dumbarton	Martin Mooney (Dumbarton)	17
1995–96	Stirling Albion (4)	East Fife	Steve McCormick (Stirling Albion)	25
1996–97	Ayr United (2)	Hamilton Academical	Paul Ritchie (Hamilton Academical)	31
1997–98	Stranraer (2)	Clydebank	Iain Stewart (Inverness Caledonian Thistle)	16
1998–99	Livingston (2)	Inverness Caledonian Thistle	Alex Bone (Stirling Albion)	21
1999–00	Clyde (4)	Alloa Athletic	Ally Graham (Stirling Albion)	17
2000–01	Partick Thistle	Arbroath	Isaac English (Stenhousemuir)	18
2001–02	Queen of the South	Alloa Athletic	John O'Neill (Queen of the South); Paul Tosh (Forfar Athletic)	19
2002–03	Raith Rovers	Brechin City	Chris Templeman (Brechin City)	21
2003–04	Airdrie United	Hamilton Academical	Gareth Hutchison (Berwick Rangers)	22
2004–05	Brechin City (4)	Stranraer	Paul Shields (Forfar Athletic)	20
2005–06	Gretna	Greenock Morton	Kenny Deuchar (Gretna)	18
2006–07	Greenock Morton (2)	Stirling Albion	Iain Russell (Brechin City)	21
2007–08	Ross County	Airdrie United	Andy Barrowman (Ross County)	24
2008–09	Raith Rovers (2)	Ayr United	Kevin Smith (Raith Rovers)	18
2009–10	Stirling Albion (5)	Alloa Athletic	Rory McAllister (Brechin City)	21
2010–11	Livingston (3)	Ayr United	Mark Roberts (Ayr United); Iain Russell (Livingston)	21
2011–12	Cowdenbeath	Arbroath	Steven Doris (Arbroath)	21
2012–13	Queen of the South (2)	Alloa Athletic	Nicky Clark (Queen of the South)	32

== Scottish League One (2013–) ==
Season	Winner	Runner-up	Top scorer	
Season	Winner	Runner-up	Player	Goals
2013–14	Rangers	Dunfermline Athletic	Michael Moffat (Ayr United)	26
2014–15	Greenock Morton (3)	Stranraer	Declan McManus (Greenock Morton)	20
2015–16	Dunfermline Athletic (2)	Ayr United	Faissal El Bakhtaoui (Dunfermline Athletic); Rory McAllister (Peterhead)	22
2016–17	Livingston (4)	Alloa Athletic	Andy Ryan (Airdrieonians)	23
2017–18	Ayr United (3)	Raith Rovers	Lawrence Shankland (Ayr United)	26
2018–19	Arbroath	Forfar Athletic	Kevin Nisbet (Raith Rovers)	30
2019–20	Raith Rovers (3)	Falkirk	David Goodwillie (Clyde)	20
2020–21	Partick Thistle (2)	Airdrieonians	Mitch Megginson (Cove Rangers)	14
2021–22	Cove Rangers	Airdrieonians	Mitch Megginson (Cove Rangers)	18
2022–23	Dunfermline Athletic (3)	Falkirk	Callum Gallagher (Airdrieonians); Ruari Paton (Queen of the South)	22
2023–24	Falkirk (2)	Hamilton Academical	Callumn Morrison (Falkirk)	23
2024–25	Arbroath (2)	Cove Rangers	Ross Cunningham (Kelty Hearts; Mitch Megginson (Cove Rangers)	13
2025–26	Inverness Caledonian Thistle	Stenhousemuir	Oli Shaw (Hamilton Academical)	19

== Total wins ==
34 different clubs (counting reserve teams separately from first teams) have won the third tier of Scottish football. Three clubs (Clyde, Partick Thistle and Rangers) have won the third tier with both their first team and their reserve team.

As of 28 June 2026

- Clubs participating in the 2026–27 Scottish League One are denoted in **bold** type.
- Clubs no longer active are denoted in italics.

Club	Winners	Runners-up
Stirling Albion	5	1
Brechin City	4	2
Livingston^{[note 1]}	4	1
Clyde	4	—
Raith Rovers	3	4
Ayr United	3	3
Dunfermline Athletic	3	2
Rangers 'A'	3	2
Greenock Morton^{[note 2]}	3	1
**Queen of the South**	2	3
Aberdeen 'A'	2	2
Arbroath	2	2
Falkirk	2	2
Stranraer	2	2
Forfar Athletic	2	1
Clyde 'A'	2	—
Partick Thistle	2	—
**Airdrieonians^{[note 3]}**	1	3
East Stirlingshire	1	2
Heart of Midlothian 'A'	1	2
Hibernian 'A'	1	2
Partick Thistle 'A'	1	2
Berwick Rangers	1	1
Clydebank	1	1
**Cove Rangers**	1	1
Cowdenbeath	1	1
Dumbarton	1	1
Dundee 'A'	1	1
Inverness Caledonian Thistle	1	1
**Montrose**	1	1
Albion Rovers	1	—
Arthurlie	1	—
Gretna	1	—
Nithsdale Wanderers	1	—
Queen's Park	1	—
Rangers	1	—
**Ross County**	1	—
**Alloa Athletic**	—	9
**Hamilton Academical**	—	3
**East Fife**	—	2
Ayr United 'A'	—	1
East Fife 'A'	—	1
Kilmarnock	—	1
Leith Athletic	—	1
Morton 'A'	—	1
Stenhousemuir	–	1
St Johnstone	—	1

^{note 1} Livingston were known as Meadowbank Thistle between 1974 and 1995
^{note 2} Greenock Morton were known as Morton before 1994
^{note 3} Airdrieonians were known as Airdrie United before 2013
