= List of Stenhousemuir F.C. seasons =

Stenhousemuir Football Club, an association football club based in Stenhousemuir, Falkirk, Scotland, was founded in 1884. The club played in lower leagues until the 1921–22 season when they joined the Scottish Football League in the newly reformed Division Two. The club won the first league title in its history when it finished in first place of the 2023–24 Scottish League Two.

The table below details their achievements in first-team competitions for each completed season since joining the Scottish Football League in 1921–22.

== Key ==
Key to divisions

- League One – Scottish League One
- League Two – Scottish League Two
- Division B – Scottish Football League Division B
- Division Two – Scottish Football League Division Two
- Second Division – Scottish Football League Second Division
- Third Division – Scottish Football League Third Division

Key to rounds

- N/A – Competition not held
- PR1 – First preliminary round, etc.
- Group – Group stage
- R1 – First round, etc.
- QF – Quarter-final
- SF – Semi-final
- W – Winners

== Seasons ==
List of seasons, including league division and statistics, cup results and top league scorer where known
Season	League record									Scottish Cup	League Cup (Note: The Scottish League Cup competition started in the 1946–47 season.)	Challenge Cup (Note: The Scottish Challenge Cup competition started in the 1990–91 season.)	Top league scorer(s)	
Season	Division	P	W	D	L	F	A	Pts	Pos	Scottish Cup	League Cup	Challenge Cup	Player(s)	Goals
1921–22	Division Two	38	14	10	14	50	51	38	11th		N/A	N/A		
1922–23	Division Two	38	13	7	18	53	67	33	14th		N/A	N/A		
1923–24	Division Two	38	16	11	11	58	45	43	4th		N/A	N/A		
1924–25	Division Two	38	15	7	16	51	58	37	11th	R1	N/A	N/A		
1925–26	Division Two	38	19	10	9	74	52	48	5th	R2	N/A	N/A		
1926–27	Division Two	38	12	12	14	69	75	36	10th		N/A	N/A		
1927–28	Division Two	38	15	5	18	75	81	35	16th	R2	N/A	N/A		
1928–29	Division Two	35	9	6	20	52	90	24	18th		N/A	N/A		
1929–30	Division Two	38	11	5	22	75	108	27	17th		N/A	N/A		
1930–31	Division Two	38	13	6	19	78	98	32	17th		N/A	N/A		
1931–32	Division Two	38	19	8	11	88	76	46	4th		N/A	N/A		
1932–33	Division Two	34	18	6	10	67	58	42	4th		N/A	N/A		
1933–34	Division Two	34	18	4	12	70	73	40	4th		N/A	N/A		
1934–35	Division Two	34	17	5	12	86	80	39	5th		N/A	N/A		
1935–36	Division Two	34	13	3	18	59	78	29	11th	R2	N/A	N/A		
1936–37	Division Two	34	14	4	16	82	86	32	10th		N/A	N/A		
1937–38	Division Two	34	17	5	12	87	78	39	8th		N/A	N/A		
1938–39	Division Two	34	15	5	14	74	69	35	8th	R1	N/A	N/A		
1939–40	Division Two	4	2	1	1	6	5	5	6th (Note: When the Second World War began, the 1939–40 Scottish Football League season was abandoned with four matches played.)	N/A	N/A	N/A		
No competitive football was played between 1939 and 1945 due to the Second World War
1946–47	Division B	26	8	7	11	43	53	23	7th	R1	R1	N/A		
1947–48	Division B	30	6	11	13	53	83	23	14th	R1	QF	N/A		
1948–49	Division B	30	8	8	14	50	54	24	12th	QF	R1	N/A		
1949–50	Division B	30	8	8	14	54	72	24	12th	QF	R1	N/A		
1950–51	Division B	30	9	2	19	51	80	20	15th	R1	R1	N/A		
1951–52	Division B	30	8	6	16	57	74	22	13th	R1	R1	N/A		
1952–53	Division B	30	10	6	14	56	65	26	12th	R1	R1	N/A		
1953–54	Division B	30	14	8	8	66	58	36	4th	R1	R1	N/A		
1954–55	Division B	30	12	8	10	70	51	32	6th	R5	R1	N/A		
1955–56	Division Two	36	20	4	12	82	54	44	5th	R6	R1	N/A		
1956–57	Division Two	36	13	6	17	71	81	32	14th	R5	R1	N/A		
1957–58	Division Two	36	12	5	19	68	98	29	16th	R2	R1	N/A		
1958–59	Division Two	36	20	6	10	87	68	46	3rd	R2	R1	N/A		
1959–60	Division Two	36	20	4	12	86	67	44	5th	R3	R1	N/A		
1960–61	Division Two	36	24	2	10	99	69	50	3rd	R1	QF	N/A		
1961–62	Division Two	36	13	5	18	69	86	31	15th	R3	R1	N/A		
1962–63	Division Two	36	13	5	18	54	75	31	16th	R1	R1	N/A		
1963–64	Division Two	36	15	5	16	83	75	35	11th	R1	R1	N/A		
1964–65	Division Two	36	11	8	17	49	74	30	15th	R1	R1	N/A		
1965–66	Division Two	36	6	7	23	47	93	19	18th	PR1	R1	N/A		
1966–67	Division Two	38	9	9	20	62	104	27	17th	PR2	R1	N/A		
1967–68	Division Two	36	7	6	23	34	93	20	18th	PR2	R1	N/A		
1968–69	Division Two	36	6	6	24	55	125	18	19th	R1	R1	N/A		
1969–70	Division Two	36	10	6	20	47	89	26	16th	PR1	R1	N/A		
1970–71	Division Two	36	14	8	14	64	70	36	10th	R1	R1	N/A		
1971–72	Division Two	36	10	8	18	41	58	28	14th	R1	R1	N/A		
1972–73	Division Two	36	14	8	14	44	41	36	10th	R2	R2	N/A		
1973–74	Division Two	36	11	5	20	44	59	27	15th	R2	R1	N/A		
1974–75	Division Two	38	14	11	13	52	42	39	11th	R1	R1	N/A		
1975–76	Second Division	26	9	5	12	39	44	23	10th	R3	QF	N/A		
1976–77	Second Division	39	15	5	19	38	49	35	9th	R1	R1	N/A		
1977–78	Second Division	39	10	10	19	43	67	30	12th	R1	R2	N/A		
1978–79	Second Division	39	12	8	19	54	58	32	10th	R2	R2	N/A		
1979–80	Second Division	39	16	9	14	56	51	41	6th	R2	R2	N/A		
1980–81	Second Division	39	13	11	15	63	58	37	10th	R3	R2	N/A		
1981–82	Second Division	39	11	6	22	41	65	28	13th	R1	R1	N/A		
1982–83	Second Division	39	7	15	17	43	66	29	11th	R3	R1	N/A		
1983–84	Second Division	39	14	11	14	47	57	39	7th	R1	R1	N/A		
1984–85	Second Division	39	15	15	9	45	43	45	5th	R2	R1	N/A		
1985–86	Second Division	39	16	8	15	55	63	40	7th	R3	R1	N/A		
1986–87	Second Division	39	10	9	20	37	58	29	12th	R2	R2	N/A		
1987–88	Second Division	39	12	9	18	49	58	33	10th	R2	R1	N/A		
1988–89	Second Division	39	9	11	19	44	59	29	14th	R3	R2	N/A		
1989–90	Second Division	39	18	9	12	62	53	45	4th	R2	R1	N/A		
1990–91	Second Division	39	16	12	11	56	42	44	4th	R2	R1	R2		
1991–92	Second Division	39	11	8	20	46	57	30	13th	R2	R1	R2		
1992–93	Second Division	39	15	10	14	59	48	40	7th	R2	R1	R1		
1993–94	Second Division	39	19	9	11	62	44	47	3rd	R2	R2	R1		
1994–95	Second Division	36	14	14	8	46	39	56	4th	QF	R1	R1		
1995–96	Second Division	36	14	7	15	51	49	49	4th	R4	R2	W		
1996–97	Second Division	36	11	11	14	49	43	44	6th	R2	R2	R1	Ian Little	15
1997–98	Second Division ↓	36	10	10	16	44	53	40	9th	R3	R1	R1	Ian Little	15
1998–99	Third Division ↑	36	19	7	10	62	42	64	2nd	R3	R2	N/A (Note: The Scottish Challenge Cup was not played in the 1998–99 season due to lack of sponsorship.)	Ross Hamilton	10
1999–2000	Second Division	36	10	8	18	44	59	38	8th	R3	R1	R1	Martin Mooney	8
2000–01	Second Division	36	12	6	18	45	63	42	7th	R1	R2	QF	Isaac English	18
2001–02	Second Division	36	8	12	16	33	57	36	9th	R1	R1	R1	Willie Irvine	7
2002–03	Second Division	36	12	11	13	49	51	47	7th	R2	R1	R1	Mark Booth	9
2003–04	Second Division ↓	36	7	4	25	28	65	25	10th	R2	R1	R1	Andy Brown	5
2004–05	Third Division	36	10	12	14	58	58	42	7th	R2	R2	R1	Paul McGrillen	18
2005–06	Third Division	36	23	4	9	78	38	73	3rd (Note: Lost in the play-off semi-final to Berwick Rangers 1–0 on aggregate.)	R2	R1	QF	Colin Cramb	16
2006–07	Third Division	36	13	5	18	53	63	44	7th	R1	R2	R1	John Dempster	9
2007–08	Third Division	36	13	9	14	50	59	48	5th	R2	R1	R1	Scott Dalziel	9
2008–09	Third Division ↑	36	16	8	12	55	46	56	4th (Note: Promoted to Scottish Second Division via the play-offs, beating Queen's Park 2–1 on aggregate in the semi-final and Cowdenbeath 5–4 in a penalty shoot-out in the final after the two legs had finished 0–0 (the second leg after extra time).)	R4	R1	R1	Scott Dalziel	15
2009–10	Second Division	36	9	13	14	38	42	40	8th	R4	R1	R2	Kevin Motion	7
2010–11	Second Division	36	10	8	18	46	59	38	8th	R4	R1	QF	Grant Anderson	7
2011–12	Second Division	36	15	6	15	54	49	51	5th	R4	R2	R1	Andy Rodgers	14
2012–13	Second Division	36	12	13	11	59	59	49	6th	R4	R3	QF	John Gemmell	18
2013–14	League One	36	12	12	12	57	66	48	5th	R5	R1	SF	Sean Dickson; John Gemmell	10
2014–15	League One	36	8	5	23	42	63	29	9th	R3	R2	R1	Colin McMenamin	15
2015–16	League One	36	11	7	18	46	80	40	8th	R3	R1	QF	Colin McMenamin	8
2016–17	League One ↓	36	11	6	19	45	64	39	10th	R4	Group	R3	Colin McMenamin; Oli Shaw	7
2017–18	League Two ↑	36	15	9	12	56	47	54	4th (Note: Promoted to Scottish League One via the play-offs, beating Queen's Park 3–2 on aggregate in the semi-final and Peterhead 2–1 on aggregate in the final.)	R3	Group	R1	Mark McGuigan	20
2018–19	League One ↓	36	10	7	19	35	61	37	9th (Note: Relegated to Scottish League Two via the play-offs, losing to Annan Athletic 4–1 on aggregate in the semi-final.)	R4	Group	R1	Mark McGuigan	16
2019–20	League Two	28	7	8	13	32	48	29	8th (Note: The 2019–20 Scottish League Two was curtailed due to the COVID-19 pandemic, with league positions and promotion to League One decided on a points-per-game basis.)	R2	Group	QF	David Hopkirk	8
2020–21	League Two	22	7	5	10	25	35	26	6th	R3	Group	N/A (Note: The Scottish Challenge Cup was not played in the 2020–21 season due to the COVID-19 pandemic.)	Botti Biabi; Mark McGuigan	6
2021–22	League Two	36	13	10	13	47	46	49	5th	R3	Group	R2	Thomas Orr	13
2022–23	League Two	36	12	11	13	51	55	47	6th	R4	Group	R2	Matty Yates	14
2023–24	League Two ↑	36	18	14	4	50	31	68	1st	R2	Group	R2	Matthew Aitken	14
2024–25	League One	36	15	8	13	48	45	53	4th (Note: Lost in the promotion play-off semi-final to Airdrieonians 5–2 on aggregate.)	R4	Group	R4	Blair Alston; Corey O'Donnell	9
2025–26	League One	36	18	13	5	50	27	67	2nd (Note: Promoted to the Scottish Championship via the play-offs, beating Queen of the South in the semi-final and Alloa Athletic 3–2 on aggregate in the final.)	R5	Group	QF		
