= List of Stirling Albion F.C. seasons =

This is an incomplete list of Stirling Albion Football Club seasons up to the present day. The list details Stirling's record in major league and cup competitions, and the club's top league goal scorer of each season where available. Top scorers in bold were also the top scorers in Stirling's division that season. Records of competitions such as the Stirlingshire Cup are not included.

== Seasons ==
Season	League									Scottish Cup	League Cup	Challenge Cup	Top league goalscorer	
Season	Division	P	W	D	L	F	A	Pts	Pos	Scottish Cup	League Cup	Challenge Cup	Name	Goals
1946–47 (Note: First season playing home fixtures at Annfield Stadium, Stirling.)	Div C	18	13	4	1	66	22	30	1st	—	—	— (Note: The Scottish Challenge Cup competition did not begin until 1990.)		
1947–48	Div B	30	11	6	13	85	66	28	8th	R2	R1	—		
1948–49	Div B	30	20	2	8	71	47	72	2nd	R1	R1	—		
1949–50	Div A	30	6	3	21	38	77	15	16th	QF	R1	—		
1950–51	Div B	30	21	3	6	78	44	45	2nd	R1	R1	—		
1951–52	Div A	30	5	5	20	36	99	15	16th	R2	R1	—		
1952–53	Div B	30	20	4	6	64	43	44	1st	R2	QF	—		
1953–54	Div A	30	10	4	16	39	62	24	14th	R3	R1	—		
1954–55	Div A	30	2	2	26	29	105	6	16th	R5	R1	—		
1955–56	Div 1	34	4	5	25	23	82	13	18th	R6	R1	—		
1956–57	Div 2	36	17	5	14	81	64	39	8th	R5	R1	—		
1957–58	Div 2	36	25	5	6	105	48	55	1st	R2	R1	—		
1958–59	Div 1	34	11	8	15	54	64	30	12th	QF	R1	—		
1959–60	Div 1	34	7	8	19	55	72	22	17th	R2	R1	—		
1960–61	Div 2	36	24	7	5	89	37	55	1st	R1	R1	—		
1961–62	Div 1	34	6	6	22	34	76	18	18th	QF	SF	—		
1962–63	Div 2	36	16	4	16	74	75	36	10th	R1	R1	—		
1963–64	Div 2	36	6	8	22	47	99	20	19th	R1	QF	—		
1964–65	Div 2	36	26	7	3	84	41	59	1st	QF	R1	—		
1965–66	Div 1	34	9	8	17	40	68	26	15th	R2	R1	—		
1966–67	Div 1	34	5	9	20	31	85	19	16th	R1	R1	—		
1967–68	Div 1	34	4	4	26	29	105	12	18th	R1	R1	—		
1968–69	Div 2	36	21	6	9	67	40	48	4th	R1	R1	—		
1969–70	Div 2	36	18	10	8	70	40	46	4th	R1	R1	—		
1970–71	Div 2	36	12	8	16	61	61	32	12th	R4	R1	—		
1971–72	Div 2	36	21	8	7	75	37	50	3rd	R2	QF	—		
1972–73	Div 2	36	19	9	8	70	39	47	4th	R4	R1	—		
1973–74	Div 2	36	17	6	13	76	50	40	7th	R4	R2	—		
1974–75	Div 2	38	17	9	12	67	55	43	8th (Note: Due to league restructuring the teams ranked 7th to 20th of the 1974–75 Second Division were moved to a new "Division Two" to make room for a new Premier Division above Division One for the 1975–76 season. The new Second Division became the third tier of Scottish football behind the new First Division and Premier Division.)	R2	R1	—		
1975–76	Div 2	26	9	7	10	41	33	25	6th	R4	R1	—		
1976–77	Div 2	39	22	11	6	59	29	55	1st	R3	QF	—		
1977–78	Div 1	39	15	12	12	60	52	42	5th	R4	R3	—		
1978–79	Div 1	39	13	9	17	43	55	35	8th	R3	R1	—		
1979–80	Div 1	39	13	13	13	40	40	39	8th	R4	R3	—		
1980–81	Div 1	39	6	11	22	18	48	23	13th	R4	R2	—		
1981–82	Div 2	39	12	11	16	39	44	35	8th	R1	R1	—		
1982–83	Div 2	39	18	10	11	57	41	46	5th	R2	R1	—		
1983–84	Div 2	39	14	14	11	51	42	42	4th	R3	R1	—		
1984–85	Div 2	39	15	13	11	62	47	43	6th	R2	R2	—		
1985–86	Div 2	39	18	8	13	57	53	44	5th	R3	R3	—		
1986–87	Div 2	39	20	12	7	55	33	52	3rd	R2	R2	—		
1987–88	Div 2	39	18	10	11	60	51	46	5th	R1	R2	—		
1988–89	Div 2	39	15	12	12	64	55	42	4th	R1	R2	—		
1989–90	Div 2	39	20	7	12	73	50	47	3rd	QF	R1	—		
1990–91	Div 2	39	20	14	5	62	24	54	1st	R3	R1	R1		
1991–92	Div 1	44	14	13	17	50	57	41	8th	R3	R2	R2		
1992–93 (Note: Last season playing home fixtures at Annfield Stadium.)	Div 1	44	11	13	20	44	61	35	10th	R3	R2	QF		
1993–94 (Note: First season playing home fixtures at Forthbank Stadium, Stirling.)	Div 1	44	13	9	22	41	68	35	9th (Note: The teams placed 8th–12th were relegated to the Second Division, with a new Third Division below.)	R4	R2	R2		
1994–95	Div 2	36	17	7	12	54	43	58	3rd	R3	R2	R2		
1995–96	Div 2	36	24	9	3	83	30	81	1st	R4	R3	SF		
1996–97	Div 1	36	12	10	14	54	61	46	7th	R3	R2	QF		
1997–98	Div 1	36	8	10	18	40	56	34	10th	R4	QF	R2		
1998–99	Div 2	36	12	8	16	50	63	44	6th	R4	R2	— (Note: The 1998–99 Scottish Challenge Cup tournament was suspended due to lack of sponsorship.)		
1999–2000	Div 2	36	11	7	18	60	72	40	7th	R3	R1	SF		
2000–01	Div 2	36	5	17	14	34	50	32	10th	R4	R1	R1		
2001–02	Div 3	36	9	10	17	45	68	37	9th	R2	R3	R1		
2002–03	Div 3	36	15	11	10	50	44	56	5th	R2	R2	R1		
2003–04	Div 3	36	23	8	5	78	27	77	2nd	R2	R1	R2		
2004–05	Div 2	36	14	9	13	56	55	51	4th	R2	R2	R2	Scott McLean	9
2005–06	Div 2	36	15	6	15	54	63	51	5th	R3	R2	QF	Chris Aitken; Paddy Connolly	12
2006–07	Div 2	36	21	6	9	67	39	69	2nd	R3	R1	R1	Colin Cramb	14
2007–08	Div 1	36	4	12	20	41	71	24	10th	R4	R2	R1	Chris Aitken	13
2008–09	Div 2	36	14	11	11	59	49	53	5th	R3	R1	R1	Martin Grehan; David McKenna	12
2009–10	Div 2	36	18	11	7	68	48	65	1st	R5	R1	QF	Martin Grehan; David McKenna; Iain Russell	7
2010–11	Div 1	36	4	8	24	32	82	20	10th	R3	R1	R2	Gordon Smith	11
2011–12	Div 2	36	9	7	20	46	70	34	10th	R3	R1	R2	Scott Davidson	9
2012–13	Div 3	36	12	9	15	59	58	45	7th	R3	R1	R1	Jordan White	13
2013–14	L2	36	16	10	10	60	50	58	3rd	R4	R1	R1	Jordan White	15
2014–15	L1	36	4	8	24	35	84	20	10th	R4	R1	R2	Gordon Smith	8
2015–16	L2	36	13	9	14	47	46	48	7th	R4	R1	R1	Steven Doris; Darren L. Smith	9
2016–17	L2	36	12	11	13	50	59	47	6th	R4	GS	R1	Darren L. Smith	11
2017–18	L2	36	16	7	13	61	52	55	3rd	R2	GS	R1	Darren L. Smith	22
2018–19	L2	36	13	8	15	44	45	47	5th	R2	GS	R1	Darren L. Smith	11
2019–20	L2	28	10	6	12	34	35	36	6th (Note: The 2019–20 Scottish League Two was curtailed due to the COVID-19 pandemic, with league positions, promotions and relegations decided on a points-per-game basis.)	R3	GS	R3	Darryl Duffy	10
2020–21	L2	22	10	6	6	32	22	36	5th	R2	GS	—	Andy Ryan	10
2021–22	L2	36	11	9	16	41	46	42	7th	R4	GS	R2	Dale Carrick	11
2022–23	L2	36	21	10	5	67	37	73	1st	R3	GS	R2	Dale Carrick	19
2023–24	L1	36	10	9	17	39	58	39	9th	R3	R2	R2	Dale Carrick	9
2024–25	L2	36	14	6	16	50	57	48	6th	R3	GS	R3	Adam Brown	9
2025–26	L2	36	9	11	16	46	63	38	8th	R3	GS	R3	Russell McLean	14

== Key ==
Champions	Runners-up	Promoted	Relegated

- P = Played
- W = Games won
- D = Games drawn
- L = Games lost
- F = Goals for
- A = Goals against
- Pts = Points
- Pos = Final position
- GS = Group stage
- R1 = Round 1
- R2 = Round 2
- R3 = Round 3
- R4 = Round 4
- R5 = Round 5
- R6 = Round 6
- QF = Quarter-finals
- SF = Semi-finals
- L1 = Scottish League One
- L2 = Scottish League Two
- Div 1 = Scottish First Division
- Div 2 = Scottish Second Division
- Div 3 = Scottish Third Division
- Div A = Scottish Division A
- Div B = Scottish Division B
- Div C = Scottish Division C
