= 1938–39 Dumbarton F.C. season =

Dumbarton
1938–1939 season
- Stadium: Boghead Park, Dumbarton
- Scottish League Division Two: 11th
- Scottish Cup: First Round
- Top goalscorer: League: J McBride (19); All: J McBride (20)

The 1938–39 season was the 62nd Scottish football season in which Dumbarton competed at national level, entering the Scottish Football League and the Scottish Cup.

== Scottish League ==
Dumbarton went into their 16th successive season in the Second Division encouraged by the positive performance from the previous campaign, and indeed with 6 wins and 3 draws from their first 10 games, it seemed that at last a challenge on the title could be mounted, but as before, the good results couldn't be maintained, and with only one win from the next 12 games the chance was gone. In the end, Dumbarton finished a disappointing 11th out of 18, with 30 points - half of that gathered by champions Cowdenbeath.

13 August 1938 League	Dumbarton	4–0	East Stirling	Boghead Park
	Smith, Jm 15', 46'; Cameron 54'; Mooney (OG)			Attendance: 4,500; Referee: E Gibbon

20 August 1938 League	Brechin City	0–3	Dumbarton	Glebe Park, Brechin
			Fraser 3', 70'; Smith, Jm 42' (pen.)	Attendance: 1,000; Referee: J Henderson

27 August 1938 League	Dumbarton	1–3	Morton	Boghead Park
	Fraser 70'		Collins 3'; Anderson 8'; Meechan 44' (pen.)	Attendance: 7,000; Referee: R Scott

3 September 1938 League	Leith Athletic	1–2	Dumbarton	Old Meadowbank
	Duffy 5'		Smith, Jm 1'; Cameron 35'	Attendance: 2,000; Referee: A Williamson

10 September 1938 League	Dumbarton	2–0	Forfar Athletic	Boghead Park
	Smith,Jm 24' (pen.); Cameron 68'			Attendance: 4,000; Referee: C Faultless

17 September 1938 League	Edinburgh City	2–2	Dumbarton	East Pilton, Edinburgh
	White 2', 15'		Hughes 23', 48'	Referee: J Boyd

24 September 1938 League	Dumbarton	1–0	Dundee United	Boghead Park
	Murray 40'			Attendance: 4,000; Referee: W Robertson

1 October 1938 League	Dunfermline Athletic	2–2	Dumbarton	East End Park, Dunfermline
	Callan 27'; McFadden 40'		Bulloch 33'; Smith, J 60' (pen.)	Attendance: 2,000; Referee: J McKerracher

8 October 1938 League	Dumbarton	2–2	Stenhousemuir	Boghead Park
	Smith, G 20'; Smith, Jm 30'		McMillan 48'; Stark 52'	Attendance: 4,000; Referee: J Mackay

15 October 1938 League	Dumbarton	2–1	King's Park	Boghead Park
	Cameron 5'; Yuill 80'		Kennan 40'	Attendance: 4,000; Referee: W Robertson

22 October 1938 League	East Fife	5–1	Dumbarton	Bayview Park, Methil
	Adams 15', 76' (pen.); Miller 23'; McLafferty 67'; McLeod 75'		Smith,G 30'	Attendance: 5,000; Referee: J Boyd

29 October 1938 League	Dumbarton	4–4	Dundee	Boghead Park
	McBride; McArdle; Murray		McGillivray (pen.); Stewart 48'; McAllister (OG); Laurie	Attendance: 4,500; Referee: C Faultless

5 November 1938 League	Montrose	2–2	Dumbarton	Links Park
	Galloway 46'; Adam		Trialist 11'; McBride 35'	Attendance: 1,000; Referee: J Mackay

12 November 1938 League	Dumbarton	0–0	Airdrie	Boghead Park
				Attendance: 4,000; Referee: R Scott

19 November 1938 League	Dumbarton	1–4	Cowdenbeath	Boghead Park
	Yuill 62'		Milne 5'; Boag 17'; Walls 41' (pen.); Hillan 53'	Attendance: 5,000; Referee: J Provan

26 November 1938 League	St Bernard's	2–4	Dumbarton	Royal Gymnasium Ground
	Johnston, J (pen.); Johnston, S		McBride; McKillop	Attendance: 1,000; Referee: J Taylor

3 December 1938 League	Dumbarton	2–3	Alloa Athletic	Boghead Park
	McKillop 25'; Yuill 62'		Gallacher 19'; Rice 40'; Fitzsimmons 42'	Attendance: 4,500; Referee: C Faultless

10 December 1938 League	Dundee United	4–2	Dumbarton	Tannadice Park
	Benzie 6', 84'; Hutchinson 11', 19'		McBride 12'	Attendance: 3,000; Referee: J Smillie

17 December 1938 League	Dumbarton	2–2	Montrose	Boghead Park
	McKillop 8'; Casey 31' (pen.)		Adam 43'; McMahon 76'	Attendance: 2,500; Referee: W Robertson

31 December 1938 League	Dumbarton	1–1	Leith Athletic	Boghead Park
	McKillop		Robertson	Referee: J Lapping

2 January 1939 League	Forfar Athletic	6–6	Dumbarton	Station Park, Forfar
	McLean; Adamson 45'; Sturrock (pen.) (pen.); Wattie		McKillop 5'; McBride 9', 30'; McArdle; Yuill 65'	Attendance: 1,600; Referee: H Havard

14 January 1939 League	Cowdenbeath	3–1	Dumbarton	Central Park, Cowdenbeath
	Milne 16'; Walls 68'; Monaghan 74' (OG)		McKillop 60'	Attendance: 1,000; Referee: J Boyd

28 January 1939 League	Dumbarton	2–0	East Fife	Boghead Park
	Smith, G 72'; McArdle 87'			Attendance: 3,000; Referee: J Mackay

4 February 1939 League	Dumbarton	1–3	Brechin City	Boghead Park
	Smith, G 22'		Watson 29', 39'; Smith, Jm 42' (OG)	Attendance: 2,000; Referee: R Scott

11 February 1939 League	Airdrie	6–1	Dumbarton	Broomfield Park
	Donald 17', 21', 23', 57'; O'Rawe 65'; Divers 77'		Bulloch 44'	Attendance: 2,000; Referee: A Williamson

18 February 1939 League	East Stirling	6–4	Dumbarton	Firs Park
	Newman 23'; Morrison 47', 64'; Ferguson 55', 87'; Cook 69'		McBride 6', 32', 83'; McArdle 70'	Referee: J Taylor

25 February 1939 League	Dumbarton	2–2	Dunfermline Athletic	Boghead Park
	McAllister 30' (pen.), 75' (pen.)		McFadden 56'; Johnston 59'	Attendance: 2,000; Referee: R Scott

4 March 1939 League	Stenhousemuir	2–0	Dumbarton	Ochilview Park
	Donald 40'; Nichol 80'			Referee: A Williamson

18 March 1939 League	Morton	2–1	Dumbarton	Cappielow Park
	Anderson 9'; Gillespie 81'		Yuill 33'	Attendance: 1,200; Referee: J Boyd

1 April 1939 League	Dumbarton	1–2	St Bernard's	Boghead Park
	Cameron 10'		Kemp 52'; Miller 63'	Referee: W Robertson

8 April 1939 League	Alloa Athletic	2–1	Dumbarton	Recreation Park, Alloa
	Smith 23'; Fitzsimmons 89'		Yuill 5'	Referee: A Williamson

15 April 1939 League	Dundee	1–1	Dumbarton	Dens Park
	Wilson		McBride	Attendance: 1,700; Referee: G Bryden

22 April 1939 League	Dumbarton	5–1	Edinburgh City	Boghead Park
	McBride 19', 23', 57', 87'; Yuill 23'		Newman 36'	Referee: J Smillie

26 April 1939 League	King's Park	2–2	Dumbarton	Forthbank Park
	Goal		McBride; Speedie

== Scottish Cup ==
Dumbarton fell at the 'first hurdle' in a shock defeat to non-league minnows Blairgowrie.

21 January 1939 Cup R1	Blairgowrie	3–2	Dumbarton	Blairgowrie and Rattray
	Linton 3' (pen.), 25'; Boland 60'		Mcallister 27' (pen.); McBride 66'	Attendance: 1,500; Referee: W Keys

== Player statistics ==
No.	Pos	Nat	Player	Total		Second Division		Scottish Cup	
No.	Pos	Nat	Player	Apps	Goals	Apps	Goals	Apps	Goals
	GK	(Scotland) SCO	Andrew Cumming	12	0	11	0	1	0
	GK	(Scotland) SCO	William Morrison	23	0	23	0	0	0
	DF	(Scotland) SCO	Thomas Bilsland	12	0	12	0	0	0
	DF	(Scotland) SCO	Walter Bulloch	23	2	23	2	0	0
	DF	(Scotland) SCO	John Casey	27	1	26	1	1	0
	DF	(Scotland) SCO	John Newton	19	0	18	0	1	0
	DF	(Scotland) SCO	John Smith	16	0	16	0	0	0
	MF	(Scotland) SCO	Frank Campbell	2	0	2	0	0	0
	MF	(Scotland) SCO	James McAllister	23	3	22	2	1	1
	MF	(Scotland) SCO	Patrick McArdle	29	4	28	4	1	0
	MF	(Scotland) SCO	William Monaghan	18	0	17	0	1	0
	MF	(Scotland) SCO	Stephen Murray	29	2	28	2	1	0
	FW	(Scotland) SCO	William Cameron	17	5	17	5	0	0
	FW	(Scotland) SCO	John Craig	8	0	8	0	0	0
	FW	(Scotland) SCO	John Forsyth	6	0	6	0	0	0
	FW	(Scotland) SCO	N James Fraser	3	3	3	3	0	0
	FW	(Scotland) SCO	W Hughes	1	2	1	2	0	0
	FW	(Scotland) SCO	Alistair MacKillop	20	7	19	7	1	0
	FW	(Scotland) SCO	John McBride	25	20	24	19	1	1
	FW	(Scotland) SCO	McLean	1	0	1	0	0	0
	FW	(Scotland) SCO	Miller	1	0	1	0	0	0
	FW	(Scotland) SCO	Gavin Smith	27	4	26	4	1	0
	FW	(Scotland) SCO	Jimmy Smith	11	7	11	7	0	0
	FW	(Scotland) SCO	Robert Speedie	3	1	3	1	0	0
	FW	(Scotland) SCO	John Yuill	28	7	27	7	1	0
	FW	(Scotland) SCO	Trialist	1	1	1	1	0	0

=== Transfers ===
==== Players in ====
Player	From	Date
(Scotland) John Craig	(Scotland) Third Lanark	27 May 1938
(Scotland) Thomas Bilsland	(England) Manchester City	30 May 1938
(Scotland) Jmaes Fraser	(England) Tranmere Rovers	10 Jun 1938
(Scotland) John Newton	(Scotland) Aberdeen	11 Jun 1938
(Scotland) John Yuill	(Scotland) Duntocher Hibs	13 Jun 1938
(Scotland) Walter Bulloch	(Scotland) East Stirling	7 Jul 1938
(Scotland) William Cameron	(Scotland) Albion Rovers	9 Aug 1938
(Scotland) Patrick McArdle	(Northern Ireland) Belfast Celtic	1 Sep 1938
(Scotland) John McBride	(Scotland) Ardrossan Winton Rovers	19 Oct 1938
(Scotland) Frank Campbell	(England) Southampton	29 Oct 1938
(Scotland) John Smith	(Scotland) Queen of the South	10 Nov 1938
(Scotland) Alistair MacKillop	(Scotland)	18 Nov 1938
(Scotland) William Monaghan	(Scotland) Duntocher Hibs	24 Nov 1938
(Scotland) Andrew Cumming	(Scotland)	3 Dec 1938
(Scotland) John Forsyth	(Scotland)	11 Apr 1939

==== Players out ====
Player	To	Date
(Scotland) Abram Robertson	(Scotland) Morton	15 Sep 1938
(Scotland) Jmaes Fraser	(England) Tranmere Rovers	14 Oct 1938
(Scotland) Frank Campbell	(Scotland) Released	10 Nov 1938
(Scotland) Gavin Smith	(England) Barnsley	25 Feb 1939
(Scotland) Stephen Murray	(Scotland) Released	30 Mar 1939
(Scotland) John Newton	(Scotland) Released	30 Mar 1939
(Scotland) Daniel Clancy	(Scotland) Ayr United	
(Scotland) John Clay	(Scotland) King's Park	
(Scotland) Alexander Cochrane	(Scotland) Rothwell	

In addition John Curly, Archibald Duffy, William Kemp, James McKain and Willie White all played their last games in Dumbarton 'colours'.
