= PFA Scotland Players' Player of the Year (lower leagues) =

Scottish football award

This is a list of recipients of the Professional Footballers' Association Scotland (PFA Scotland) Player's Player of the Year award for each of the three divisions (the Scottish Championship, Scottish League One and Scottish League Two), below the top division (the Scottish Premiership). Each is an annual award given to the player who is adjudged to have been the best of the season in Scottish football. The winner is chosen by a vote amongst the members of the players' trade union, the Professional Footballers' Association Scotland (PFA Scotland).

The award was formerly known as the Scottish Professional Footballers' Association Players' Player of the Year, but was renamed after the SPFA merged with the (English) Professional Footballers' Association to become PFA Scotland. In 2007 the SPFA was replaced by a new body, PFA Scotland, but the new organisation's awards are considered to be a direct continuation of the SPFA awards. A shortlist of nominees is published in April and the winner of the award, along with the winners of PFA Scotland's other annual awards, is announced at a gala event in Glasgow a few days later.

== Winners ==
Season	Scottish Championship (Note: The second tier of the Scottish football league system was known as the Scottish First Division between 1975–2013.)			Scottish League One (Note: The third tier of the Scottish football league system was known as the Scottish Second Division between 1975–2013.)			Scottish League Two (Note: The fourth tier of the Scottish football league system was known as the Scottish Third Division between 1994–2013.)			Ref
Season	Nat	Player	Club	Nat	Player	Club	Nat	Player	Club	Ref
1980–81	(Scotland)	Eric Sinclair	Dundee	(Scotland)	Jimmy Robertson	Queen of the South	division did not exist			
1981–82	(Scotland)	Brian McLaughlin	Motherwell	(Scotland)	Pat Nevin	Clyde	division did not exist			
1982–83	(Scotland)	Gerry McCabe	Clydebank	(Scotland)	John Colquhoun	Stirling Albion	division did not exist			
1983–84	(Scotland)	Gerry McCabe	Clydebank	(Scotland)	Jim Liddle	Forfar Athletic	division did not exist			
1984–85	(Scotland)	Gerry McCabe	Clydebank	(Scotland)	Bernie Slaven	Albion Rovers	division did not exist			
1985–86	(Scotland)	John Brogan	Hamilton Accies	(Scotland)	Mark Smith	Queen's Park	division did not exist			
1986–87	(Scotland)	Jimmy Holmes	Greenock Morton	(Scotland)	John Sludden	Ayr United	division did not exist			
1987–88	(Scotland)	Alex Taylor	Hamilton Academical	(Scotland)	Henry Templeton	Ayr United	division did not exist			
1988–89	(Scotland)	Ross Jack	Dunfermline Athletic	(Scotland)	Paul Hunter	East Fife	division did not exist			
1989–90	(Scotland)	Ken Eadie	Clydebank	(Scotland)	Willie Watters	Kilmarnock	division did not exist			
1990–91	(England)	Simon Stainrod	Falkirk	(England)	Kevin Todd	Berwick Rangers	division did not exist			.
1991–92	(Scotland)	Gordon Dalziel	Raith Rovers	(Scotland)	Andy Thomson	Queen of the South	division did not exist			
1992–93	(Scotland)	Gordon Dalziel	Raith Rovers	(Scotland)	Sandy Ross	Brechin City	division did not exist			
1993–94	(England)	Richard Cadette	Falkirk	(Scotland)	Andy Thomson	Queen of the South	division did not exist			
1994–95	(Scotland)	Stevie Crawford	Raith Rovers	(Scotland)	Derek McInnes	Greenock Morton	(Scotland)	David Bingham	Forfar Athletic	
1995–96	(Northern Ireland)	George O'Boyle	St Johnstone	(Scotland)	Steve McCormick	Stirling Albion	(Scotland)	Jason Young	Livingston	
1996–97	(England)	Roddy Grant	St Johnstone	(Scotland)	Paul Ritchie	Hamilton Accies	(Scotland)	Iain Stewart	Inverness CT	
1997–98	(Scotland)	James Grady	Dundee	(Scotland)	Paul Lovering	Clydebank	(Scotland)	Willie Irvine	Alloa Athletic	
1998–99	(Trinidad and Tobago)	Russell Latapy	Hibernian	(Scotland)	David Bingham	Livingston	(England)	Neil Tarrant	Ross County	
1999–2000	(Scotland)	Stevie Crawford	Dunfermline Athletic	(Scotland)	Brian Carrigan	Clyde	(Scotland)	Steven Milne	Forfar Athletic	
2000–01	(Scotland)	David Bingham	Livingston	(Scotland)	Scott McLean	Partick Thistle	(Scotland)	Steve Hislop	East Stirlingshire	
2001–02	(Republic of Ireland)	Owen Coyle	Airdrieonians	(Scotland)	John O'Neill	Queen of the South	(Scotland)	Paul McManus	East Fife	
2002–03	(Scotland)	Dennis Wyness	Inverness CT	(Scotland)	Chris Templeman	Brechin City	(Scotland)	Alex Williams	Greenock Morton	
2003–04	(Scotland)	Ian Harty	Clyde	(Scotland)	Paul Tosh	Forfar Athletic	(Scotland)	Michael Moore	Stranraer	
2004–05	(Trinidad and Tobago)	Russell Latapy	Falkirk	(Scotland)	Steven Hampshire	Brechin City	(Scotland)	David Bingham	Getna	
2005–06	(Scotland)	John Rankin	Ross County	(Scotland)	James Grady	Gretna	(Finland)	Markus Paatelainen	Cowdenbeath	
2006–07	(Scotland)	Colin McMenamin	Gretna	(Scotland)	Iain Russell	Brechin City	(Scotland)	Scott Chaplain	Albion Rovers	
2007–08	(Scotland)	Graham Dorrans	Livingston	(Scotland)	Allan Russell	Airdrie United	(Scotland)	Jonathan Smart	East Fife	
2008–09	(Scotland)	Leigh Griffiths	Livingston	(Scotland)	Bryan Prunty	Ayr United	(Scotland)	Bobby Barr	Albion Rovers	
2009–10	(Republic of Ireland)	Adam Rooney	Inverness CT	(Scotland)	Rory McAllister	Brechin City	(Scotland)	Robbie Winters	Livingston	
2010–11	(Scotland)	John Baird	Raith Rovers	(Scotland)	Rory McAllister	Brechin City	(Scotland)	Gavin Swankie	Arbroath	
2011–12	(France)	Farid El Alagui	Falkirk	(Scotland)	Jon Robertson	Cowdenbeath	(Scotland)	Stevie May	Alloa Athletic	
2012–13	(England)	Lyle Taylor	Falkirk	(Scotland)	Nicky Clark	Queen of the South	(Scotland)	Lee Wallace	Rangers	
2013–14	(England)	Kane Hemmings	Cowdenbeath	(Scotland)	Lee Wallace	Rangers	(Scotland)	Rory McAllister	Peterhead	
2014–15	(Scotland)	Scott Allan	Hibernian	(Scotland)	Declan McManus	Greenock Morton	(Scotland)	Bobby Linn	Arbroath	
2015–16	(Scotland)	Lee Wallace	Rangers	(France)	Faissal El Bakhtaoui	Dunfermline Athletic	(Scotland)	Nathan Austin	East Fife	
2016–17	(Scotland)	John McGinn	Hibernian	(Scotland)	Liam Buchanan	Livingston	(Scotland)	Shane Sutherland	Elgin City	
2017–18	(Scotland)	Lewis Morgan	St Mirren	(Scotland)	Lawrence Shankland	Ayr United	(Scotland)	Darren Smith	Stirling Albion	
2018–19	(Scotland)	Stephen Dobbie	Queen of the South	(Scotland)	Bobby Linn	Arbroath	(Scotland)	Blair Henderson	Edinburgh City	
2019–20	Due to the COVID-19 pandemic, PFA Scotland cancelled their awards for the 2019–20 season.									
2020–21	(Northern Ireland)	Liam Boyce	Heart of Midlothian		not awarded			not awarded		
2021–22	(Scotland)	Michael McKenna	Arbroath	(Scotland)	Dylan Easton	Airdrieonians	(England)	Joe Cardle	Kelty Hearts	
2022–23	(England)	Dipo Akinyemi	Ayr United	(Scotland)	Calum Gallagher	Airdrieonians	(Scotland)	Charlie Reilly	Albion Rovers	
2023–24	(Scotland)	Brian Graham	Partick Thistle	(Scotland)	Callumn Morrison	Falkirk	(Scotland)	Gregor Buchanan	Stenhousemuir	
2024–25	(Scotland)	Brad Spencer	Falkirk	(Scotland)	Fraser Taylor	Arbroath	(Scotland)	Alan Trouten	East Fife	
2025–26	(Scotland)	Josh McPake	St Johnstone	(Scotland)	Oli Shaw	Hamilton Academical	(Scotland)	John Robertson	East Kilbride	

=== List of other nominees ===
Season	Scottish Championship			Scottish League One			Scottish League Two			Ref
Season	Nat	Player	Club	Nat	Player	Club	Nat	Player	Club	Ref
1980–81	(Scotland)	Bobby Ford	Raith Rovers	(England)	Steve Hanson	Stenhousemuir	division did not exist			
1980–81	(Scotland)	Jackie McNamara	Hibernian	(Scotland)	McCombe	Alloa Athletic	division did not exist			
1980–81	(Scotland)	Eric Morris	Ayr United	(Scotland)	Irvine	Queen's Park	division did not exist			
1981–82	(Scotland)	John Gahagan	Motherwell	(England)	Steve Hanson	Forfar Athletic	division did not exist			
1981–82	(Scotland)	Jim Morton	St Johnstone	(Scotland)	Ian Campbell	Brechin City	division did not exist			
1981–82	(Scotland)	John McGregor	Queen's Park	(Scotland)	Martin McDermott	Berwick Rangers	division did not exist			
1982–83	(Scotland)	Mo Johnson	Partick Thistle	(Scotland)	Jim Liddle	Forfar Athletic	division did not exist			
1982–83	(Scotland)	Donald Park	Partick Thistle	(Scotland)	Ian McPhee	Forfar Athletic	division did not exist			
1982–83	(Scotland)	Pat Nevin	Clyde	(Scotland)	Gerry Collins	Albion Rovers	division did not exist			
1983–84	(Scotland)	Derek Frye	Clyde				division did not exist			
1983–84	(Scotland)	John Bourke	Dumbarton	(Scotland)	Ian McPhee	Forfar Athletic	division did not exist			
1983–84	(Scotland)	Tim Coyle	Dumbarton				division did not exist			
1984–85	(Scotland)	Gerry McCoy	Falkirk	(Scotland)	Kenny Thornton	Alloa Athletic	division did not exist			
1984–85	(Scotland)	Peter Houston	Falkirk	(Scotland)	Ronnie Lowrie	Alloa Athletic	division did not exist			
1984–85	(Scotland)	Jamie Fairlie	Airdrieonians	(Scotland)	Willie Irvine	Stirling Albion	division did not exist			
1985–86	(Scotland)	Graham Mitchell	Hamilton Academical	(Scotland)	Graene Robertson	Queen of the South	division did not exist			
1985–86	(Scotland)	Ian McAllister	Ayr United	(Scotland)	Alan Davidson	Queen of the South	division did not exist			
1985–86	(Scotland)	John McVeigh	Clyde	(Scotland)	Tim Bryce	Queen of the South	division did not exist			
1986–87	(Scotland)	Rowan Alexander	Greenock Morton	(Scotland)	Vic Kasule	Meadowbank Thistle	division did not exist			
1986–87	(Scotland)	John Watson	Dunfermline Athletic	(Scotland)	Martin Nelson	Alloa Athletic	division did not exist			
1986–87	(Scotland)	Norrie McCathie	Dunfermline Athletic	(Scotland)	Colin Hartford	Raith Rovers	division did not exist			
1987–88	(Scotland)	Willie Jamieson	Hamilton Academical	(Scotland)	John Sludden	Ayr United	division did not exist			
1987–88	(England)	Andy Willock	Clyde	(Scotland)	Jim Cowell	Ayr United	division did not exist			
1987–88	(Scotland)	Stewart Kennedy	Forfar Athletic	(Scotland)	Jimmy Boyle	Queen'Park	division did not exist			
1988–89	(Scotland)	Innes Donaldson	Airdrieonians	(Scotland)	Ray Charles	East Fife	division did not exist			
1988–89	(Scotland)	Kenny MacDonald	Airdrieonians	(Scotland)	Paul Senton	Brechin City	division did not exist			
1988–89	(Scotland)	Ken Eadie	Clydebank	(Scotland)	Billy McNeil	East Stirlingshire	division did not exist			
1989–90	(Republic of Ireland)	Owen Coyle	Clydebank	(Scotland)	Paul O'Brien	Queen's Park	division did not exist			
1989–90	(Scotland)	Stevie Gray	Airdrieonians	(Scotland)	Harry Cairney	Stenhousemuir	division did not exist			
1989–90	(Scotland)	Derek McWilliams	Falkirk	(Scotland)	Darius Harroldson	Stranraer	division did not exist			
1990–91	(Scotland)	Gordon Duncan	Raith Rovers	(Scotland)	David Lloyd	Stirling Albion	division did not exist			
1990–91	(Scotland)	Billy Dodds	Dundee	(Scotland)	Stuart Robertson	Stirling Albion	division did not exist			
1990–91	(Scotland)	David Elliot	Partick Thistle	(Scotland)	Sandy Ross	Berwick Rangers	division did not exist			
1991–92							division did not exist			
1992–93	(Scotland)	Craig Brewster	Raith Rovers	(Scotland)	Scott Howie	Clyde	division did not exist			
1992–93	(Scotland)	Billy Davies	Dunfermline Athletic	(Scotland)	Stuart Sorbie	Arbroath	division did not exist			
1992–93	(Scotland)	Tommy Burns	Kilmarnock	(Scotland)	Miller Mathieson	Stenhousemuir	division did not exist			
1993–94	(Scotland)	Brian Rice	Falkirk	(Scotland)	David Bingham	Forfar Athletic	division did not exist			
1993–94	(Scotland)	Hamish French	Dunfermline Athletic	(Scotland)	Jim Butter	Alloa Athletic	division did not exist			
1993–94	(Scotland)	Norrie McWhirter	St Mirren	(Scotland)	Tim Sloan	Stranraer	division did not exist			
1994–95	(Scotland)	Colin Cameron	Raith Rovers	(Finland)	Marko Rajamäki	Greenock Morton	(Scotland)	Colin McGlashan	Montrose	
1994–95	(England)	Peter Duffield	Hamilton Academical	(Scotland)	Derek Lilley	Greenock Morton	(Scotland)	Michael Geraghty	East Stirlingshire	
1994–95	(Scotland)	Jackie McNamara	Dunfermline Athletic	(England)	Warren Hawke	Berwick Rangers	(Scotland)	Gary Orr	Queens Park	
1995–96	(Scotland)	Craig Brewster	Dundee United	(Scotland)	Charlie Nicholas	Clyde	(Scotland)	Harry Cairney	Brechin City	
1995–96	(Finland)	Janne Lindberg	Greenock Morton	(Scotland)	Tim Bryce	Queen of the South	(Scotland)	Iain Stewart	Inverness Caley Thistle	
1995–96	(Scotland)	Andy Tod	Dunfermline Athletic	(Scotland)	Craig Taggart	Stirling Albion	(Scotland)	Peter Dwyer	East Stirlingshire	
1996–97	(Scotland)	Paddy Connolly	Airdrieonians	(Scotland)	Eddie Annand	Clyde / Dundee	(Scotland)	Bobby Main	Forfar Athletic	
1996–97	(Scotland)	John Davies	Airdrieonians	(Scotland)	Tim Bryce	Queen of the South	(Scotland)	Allan Morgan	Forfar Athletic	
1996–97	(Northern Ireland)	George O'Boyle	St Johnstone	(Scotland)	Ian Little	Stenhousemuir	(Scotland)	Gerry Farrell	Ross County	
1997–98	(Scotland)	Robert Douglas	Dundee	(England)	Derek Townsley	Queen of the South				
1997–98	(England)	David Moss	Falkirk	(Scotland)	Tim Bryce	Queen of the South				
1997–98	(Scotland)	Alex Bone	Stirling Albion	(Scotland)	Graham Harvey	Livingston				
1998–99	(England)	Glynn Hurst	Ayr United	(Scotland)	Steve Convery	Clyde	(Scotland)	Steven Ferguson	Ross County	
1998–99	(Scotland)	Stevie Crawford	Hibernian	(Scotland)	Barry Wilson	Inverness Caley Thistle	(Scotland)	John Dickson	Brechin City	
1998–99	(Scotland)	Kevin McAllister	Falkirk	(Scotland)	Alex Bone	Stirling Albion	(Scotland)	David Lorimer	Albion Rovers	
1999–2000	(Scotland)	Scott Cramm	Falkirk	(Scotland)	Martin Cameron	Alloa Athletic	(Scotland)	Andy Cargill	Forfar Athletic	
1999–2000	(Scotland)	David Nicholls	Falkirk	(Scotland)	Darius Harroldson	Hamilton Academical	(Scotland)	Steven Laidlaw	Berwick Rangers	
1999–2000	(Scotland)	Tim Turner	St Mirren	(Scotland)	John McQuade	Stirling Albion	(Scotland)	Joe Robertson	Dumbarton	
2000–01	(Scotland)	Dennis Wyness	Inverness Caley Thistle	(Scotland)	Martin Hardie	Partick Thistle	(Scotland)	Mark Bradey	Cowdenbeath	
2000–01	(Scotland)	Paul Sheerin	Inverness Caley Thistle	(Scotland)	Isaac English	Stenhousemuir	(Scotland)	Andy Brown	Dumbarton	
2000–01	(Scotland)	Gary Teale	Ayr United	(England)	Peter Weatherson	Queen of the South	(England)	Roddy Grant	Brechin City	
2001–02	(Scotland)	Barry Robson	Inverness Caley Thistle	(Scotland)	Graeme Brown	Cowdenbeath	(Scotland)	Iain Stewart	Peterhead	
2001–02	(Scotland)	Dennis Wyness	Inverness Caley Thistle	(Scotland)	Paul Tosh	Forfar Athletic	(Scotland)	Chris Templeman	Brechin City	
2001–02	(Scotland)	Scott Paterson	Partick Thistle	(Scotland)	Garry Wood	Berwick Rangers	(Scotland)	Kevin Bain	Brechin City	
2002–03	(Scotland)	Barry Robson	Inverness CT	(Scotland)	Kevin Byers	Forfar Athletic	(Scotland)	Kevin McAllister	Albion Rovers	
2002–03	(Scotland)	Paul Hartley	St Johnstone	(Spain)	Paquito Ortiz	Raith Rovers	(Scotland)	Ian Stevens	Peterhead	
2002–03	(Scotland)	Mark Kerr	Falkirk	(Scotland)	Ian Harty	Stranraer	(Scotland)	James Allan	Queen's Park	
2003–04	(Scotland)	David Bingham	Inverness Caley Thistle	(Scotland)	Gareth Hutchison	Berwick Rangers	(England)	Mick Galloway	Gretna	
2003–04	(Scotland)	Barry Robson	Inverness Caley Thistle	(England)	Peter Weatherson	Greenock Morton	(Scotland)	Scott McLean	Stirling Albion	
2003–04	(Trinidad and Tobago)	Russell Latapy	Falkirk	(Australia)	John Maisano	Greenock Morton	(Scotland)	Jorge Rowe	Stirling Albion	
2004–05										
2005–06	(Scotland)	Tim Brighton	Clyde	(Scotland)	Ryan McGuffie	Gretna	(Scotland)	Chris McGroarty	Berwick Rangers	
2005–06	(Trinidad and Tobago)	Jason Scotland	St Johnstone	(Scotland)	Jim McAlister	Greenock Morton	(Scotland)	Colin Cramb	Stenhousemuir	
2005–06	(Scotland)	Alex Neil	Hamilton Academical	(Scotland)	Bobby Linn	Peterhead	(Scotland)	Jordan Smith	East Stirlingshire	
2006–07										
2007–08	(Scotland)	Kevin McDonald	Dundee	(Scotland)	Ryan Stevenson	Ayr United	(Scotland)	Andrew Brand	East Stirlingshire	
2007–08	(Scotland)	James McArthur	Hamilton Academical	(Scotland)	Alan Trouten	Queens Park	(Scotland)	Andrew Sutherland	Elgin City	
2007–08	(Scotland)	Stephen Dobbie	Queen of the South	(Scotland)	Andrew Barrowman	Ross County	(Scotland)	John Baird	Montrose	
2008–09										
2009–10	(Scotland)	Gary Harkins	Dundee	(Scotland)	Gareth Wardlaw	Cowdenbeath	(Scotland)	Liam Fox	Livingston	
2009–10	(Scotland)	Leigh Griffiths	Dundee	(Scotland)	Paul McQuade	Cowdenbeath	(Scotland)	James Stevenson	East Stirlingshire	
2009–10	(Scotland)	Michael Gardyne	Ross County	(Scotland)	Bryan Prunty	Alloa Athletic	(Scotland)	Barry Douglas	Queen's Park	
2010–11	(Scotland)	Gary Harkins	Dundee	(Scotland)	Bobby Linn	East Fife	(Scotland)	Scott Agnew	Stranraer	
2010–11	(Scotland)	Sean Higgins	Dundee	(Scotland)	Mark Roberts	Ayr United	(France)	Armand Oné	Stranraer	
2010–11	(Northern Ireland)	Andy Kirk	Dunfermline Athletic	(Scotland)	Iain Russell	Livingston	(Scotland)	Ricky Little	Queen's Park	
2011–12	(Scotland)	Michael Gardyne	Ross County	(Scotland)	Ryan Donnelly	Airdrie United	(Scotland)	Kevin Cawley	Alloa Athletic	
2011–12	(Scotland)	Grant Murray	Ross County	(Scotland)	Steven Doris	Arbroath	(Scotland)	Ryan McCord	Alloa Athletic	
2011–12	(Northern Ireland)	Michael McGovern	Falkirk	(Scotland)	Ryan Wallace	East Fife	(Scotland)	Jamie Longworth	Queen's Park	
2012–13	(Scotland)	Chris Erskine	Partick Thistle	(Scotland)	Daniel Carmichael	Queen of the South	(Scotland)	David Templeton	Rangers	
2012–13	(Scotland)	Stefan Scougall	Livingston	(Scotland)	Steven Doris	Arbroath	(Scotland)	David Anderson	Queen's Park	
2012–13	(Scotland)	Michael Tidser	Greenock Morton	(Republic of Ireland)	Andrew Jackson	Brechin City	(Scotland)	Daniel Moore	Elgin City	
2013–14	(Scotland)	Paul MacDonald	Dundee	(Scotland)	Michael Moffat	Ayr United	(Scotland)	Andy Rodgers	Peterhead	
2013–14	(Scotland)	Rory Loy	Falkirk	(Republic of Ireland)	Jon Daly	Rangers	(Scotland)	Lee Currie	Berwick Rangers	
2013–14	(France)	Anthony Andreu	Hamilton Academical	(England)	Nicky Law	Rangers	(Scotland)	Kenny MacKay	Annan Athletic	
2014–15	(Senegal)	Morgaro Gomis	Heart of Midlothian	(Scotland)	Willis Gibson	Stranraer	(Scotland)	Simon Murray	Arbroath	
2014–15	(Turkey)	Alim Ozturk	Heart of Midlothian	(Scotland)	Jamie Stevenson	Peterhead	(Scotland)	Shane Sutherland	Elgin City	
2014–15	(Scotland)	Jamie Walker	Heart of Midlothian	(Scotland)	Alan Trouten	Brechin City	(Scotland)	Paul Woods	Queen's Park	
2015–16	(England)	Martyn Waghorn	Rangers	(England)	Joe Cardle	Dunfermline Athletic	(Scotland)	Kyle Wilkie	East Fife	
2015–16	(Australia)	Jason Cummings	Hibernian	(Scotland)	Greig Spence	Cowdenbeath	(England)	Peter Weatherson	Annan Athletic	
2015–16	(Scotland)	John McGinn	Hibernian	(Scotland)	Rory McAllister	Peterhead	(Scotland)	Bobby Linn	Arbroath	
2016–17	(Australia)	Jason Cummings	Hibernian	(Scotland)	Jordan Kirkpatrick	Alloa Athletic	(Scotland)	Bobby Linn	Arbroath	
2016–17	(Scotland)	Stephen Dobbie	Queen of the South	(Scotland)	Danny Mullen	Livingston	(Scotland)	Tim O'Brien	Forfar Athletic	
2016–17	(Scotland)	Ross Forbes	Greenock Morton	(Scotland)	Andy Ryan	Airdrieonians	(Scotland)	Tim Reilly	Elgin City	
2017–18	(Scotland)	Stephen Dobbie	Queen of the South	(Scotland)	Michael Moffat	Ayr United	(Republic of Ireland)	Seán Dillon	Montrose	
2017–18	(Scotland)	Craig Halkett	Livingston	(Scotland)	Alan Trouten	Albion Rovers	(Scotland)	Willie Gibson	Peterhead	
2017–18	(Scotland)	Cammy Smith	St Mirren	(Scotland)	Lewis Vaughan	Raith Rovers	(Scotland)	Rory McAllister	Peterhead	
2018–19	(Northern Ireland)	Billy Mckay	Ross County	(Scotland)	Dale Hilson	Forfar Athletic	(Scotland)	Chris Johnston	Annan Athletic	
2018–19	(Slovakia)	Pavol Safranko	Dundee United	(Scotland)	Kevin Nisbet	Raith Rovers	(Scotland)	John Rankin	Clyde	
2018–19	(Scotland)	Lawrence Shankland	Ayr United	(Scotland)	Dom Paul	Dumbarton	(Scotland)	Martin McNiff	Clyde	
2019–20	Due to the COVID-19 pandemic, PFA Scotland cancelled their awards for the 2019–20 season.									
2020–21	(Scotland)	Craig Gordon	Heart of Midlothian	not awarded			not awarded			
2020–21	(Scotland)	Charlie Adam	Dundee	not awarded			not awarded			
2020–21	(Scotland)	Regan Hendry	Raith Rovers	not awarded			not awarded			
2021–22	(Scotland)	Tim O'Brien	Arbroath	(Scotland)	Mitch Megginson	Cove Rangers	(England)	Owen Moxon	Annan Athletic	
2021–22	(Northern Ireland)	Kyle Lafferty	Kilmarnock	(Scotland)	Rory McAllister	Cove Rangers	(Scotland)	Jamie Barjonas	Kelty Hearts	
2021–22	(Scotland)	Scott Tiffoney	Partick Thistle	(Scotland)	Harry Milne	Cove Rangers	(Scotland)	Michael Tidser	Kelty Hearts	
2022–23	(Scotland)	Dom Paul	Queen's Park	(Scotland)	Kyle Benedictus	Dunfermline Athletic	(Scotland)	Craig Slater	Forfar Athletic	
2022–23	(Scotland)	Grant Savoury	Queen's Park	(Scotland)	Matt Todd	Dunfermline Athletic	(Scotland)	Dale Carrick	Stirling Albion	
2022–23	(Scotland)	Paul McMullan	Dundee	(Republic of Ireland)	Ruari Paton	Queen of the South	(Scotland)	Tim Goss	Annan Athletic	
2023–24	(England)	Louis Moult	Dundee United	(Scotland)	Brad Spencer	Falkirk	(Scotland)	Matty Aitken	Stenhousemuir	
2023–24	(Republic of Ireland)	Ruari Paton	Queen's Park	(Scotland)	Calvin Miller	Falkirk	(Scotland)	Nat Wedderburn	Stenhousemuir	
2023–24	(Scotland)	Lewis Vaughan	Raith Rovers	(England)	Rumarn Burrell	Cove Rangers	(Scotland)	Blair Henderson	Spartans	
2024–25										
2025–26	(Scotland)	Andrew Tod	Dunfermline Athletic	(Scotland)	Kieran Shanks	Peterhead	(Scotland)	Mark Stowe	Spartans	
2025–26	(Scotland)	Ben Stanway	Partick Thistle	(Scotland)	Ross Taylor	Stenhousemuir	(Scotland)	Willie Gibson	Annan Athletic	
2025–26	(Scotland)	Jamie Gullan	St Johnstone	(Scotland)	Alfie Stewart	Inverness	(Scotland)	Lewis Reid	Stranraer	

== Other awards ==
Season	Goal of the Season			Special Merit Award			Ref
Season	Nat	Player	Club	Nat	Winner	Note	Ref
1981–82				(Scotland)	Tom Lauchlan	Kilmarnock director	
1981–82				(Scotland)	Willie Waddell	Rangers director	
1981–82				(Scotland)		Former Celtic and Man United player.	
1982–83				(Scotland)	Andy Dickson	Dundee United trainer	
1982–83				(Scotland)	Alex Rae	Former Scottish PFA president	
1982–83				(Scotland)	Eddie Turnbull	Former Aberdeen and Hibs manager	
1983–84				(Scotland)	Archie Macpherson	BBC broadcaster	
1983–84				(Scotland)	Arthur Montford	STV broadcaster	
1984–85				(Scotland)	Desmond White	Celtic chairman	
1984–85				(Scotland)	Bobby Reid	Hamilton Academical trainer	
1985–86				(Scotland)	Tommy Walker	Former Hearts player and manager	
1985–86				(Scotland)	Yule Craig	St Mirren chairman	
1987–88				(Scotland)	Jim Steel	Celtic and Scotland physio	
1987–88				(Scotland)	David Francey	Broadcaster	
1988–89				(Scotland)	Teddy Scott	Aberdeen trainer	
1989–90				(Scotland)	Bob McPhail	Former Rangers player	
1989–90				(Scotland)	Andy Russell	Motherwell groundsman	
1990–91				(Scotland)	Harry Haddock	Former Clyde captain	
1990–91				(Scotland)	Bobby Maitland	Former journalist	
1991–92				(Scotland)	Celtic (Lisbon Lions)	1967 European Cup team	
1991–92				(Scotland)	George Young	Former Rangers and Scotland captain	
1992–93				(Scotland)	Joe Nelson	Dunfermline Athletic coach	
1992–93				(Scotland)	Lawrie Reilly	Former Hibernian (and Famous Five) player	
1995–96	(England)	Paul Gascoigne	Rangers	(Scotland)	Ronnie Simpson	Former Celtic (and Lisbon Lions) player	
1996–97				(Scotland)	Bob Laird	Historian for Third Lanark	
1997–98				(Scotland)	Allan McGraw	Former Morton player and manager	
1997–98				(Scotland)	Tom Wharton	Former UEFA listed referee	
1998–99				(Scotland)	Hugh Allan	Physio	
1999–2000				(Scotland)	Alex Cameron	Daily Record football journalist	
2000–01				(England)	Joe Baker	Former Hibs and England player	
2001–02				(Scotland)	Jimmy Johnstone	Former Celtic (and Lisbon Lions) player	
2002–03				(Scotland)	Alex Rae	Former Partick Thistle player	
2003–04				(Scotland)	Bobby Brown	Former Scotland manager	
2005–06				(England)	Sir Tom Finney	Former Preston and England player	
2006–07	(Japan)	Shunsuke Nakamura	Celtic	(Portugal)	Eusebio	Former Benfica and Portugal player	
2007–08	(Morocco)	Merouane Zemmama	Hibernian	(Scotland)	Phil O'Donnell (posthumous)	Former Motherwell captain	
2008–09	(Portugal)	Pedro Mendes	Rangers	(Scotland)	Aberdeen	1983 UEFA Cup Winners' Cup team	
2009–10	(Algeria)	Madjid Bougherra	Rangers	(Scotland)	Archie Macpherson	Football commentator	
2009–10	(Algeria)	Madjid Bougherra	Rangers	(Scotland)	Arthur Montford	Sports journalist	
2010–11	(Croatia)	Nikica Jelavic	Rangers	(Italy) (Scotland)	Rose Reilly	Former dual internationalist (Scotland and Italy)	
2011–12	(New Zealand)	Rory Fallon	Aberdeen	(Scotland)	Street Soccer Scotland	2011 Homeless World Cup team	
2012–13	(Scotland)	Bryan Prunty	Dumbarton	(Scotland)	Craig Brown	Former Clyde and Scotland manager	
2013–14	(Republic of Ireland)	Jonny Hayes	Aberdeen	(Scotland)	Frank McKeown	Stranraer player	
2014–15	(Scotland)	Stevie Mallan	St Mirren	(Scotland)	Jordan Moore	Dundee United player	
2015–16	(Scotland)	Barrie McKay	Rangers	Show Racism the Red Card (SRTRC)			
2016–17	(France)	Moussa Dembélé	Celtic	(Scotland)	Scotland women's national team	Qualified for UEFA Women's Euro 2017	
2017–18	(Scotland)	Kieran Tierney	Celtic				
2018–19	(Colombia)	Alfredo Morelos	Rangers	(Scotland)	Dr John MacLean	of Hampden Sports Clinic	
2019–20	Due to the COVID-19 pandemic, PFA Scotland cancelled their awards for the 2019–20 season.						
2020–21				(Scotland)	Scotland men's national team	Qualified for UEFA Euro 2020	
2021–22	(Australia)	Tom Rogic	Celtic				
2022–23	(Portugal)	Jota	Celtic	(Scotland)	Alex Ferguson	Former Aberdeen and Manchester United manager	
2023–24	(Wales)	Rabbi Matondo	Rangers	(Scotland)	Graeme Souness	Former Liverpool and Scotland player; Rangers manager	
2024–25	(Australia)	Jack Iredale	Hibernian	(Scotland)	Kenny Dalglish	Former Celtic, Liverpool and Scotland player; Liverpool and Blackburn Rovers manager	
2025–26	(Portugal)	Youssef Chermiti	Rangers	(Scotland)	Steve Clarke	Former St Mirren, Liverpool and Scotland player; Scotland manager	
