= Jim Liddle =

Scottish footballer (1958–2024)

Personal information
- Date of birth: 9 April 1958
- Place of birth: Edinburgh, Scotland
- Date of death: 13 October 2024 (aged 66)
- Place of death: Edinburgh, Scotland
- Position: Centre forward

Senior career*
Years	Team	Apps	(Gls)
–1978	Whitehill Welfare		
1978–1983	Cowdenbeath	151	(49)
1983–1986	Forfar Athletic	107	(44)
1986	Hamilton Academical	9	(3)
1986	→ Cowdenbeath (loan)	2	(0)
1986–1987	Meadowbank Thistle	15	(0)
- Alton Lorraine
- * Club domestic league appearances and goals

Jim Liddle (9 April 1958 – 13 October 2024) was a Scottish professional footballer who played as a centre forward in the Scottish League for Cowdenbeath, Forfar Athletic, Meadowbank Thistle and Hamilton Academical.

== Career statistics ==
Appearances and goals by club, season and competition
Club	Season	League			Scottish Cup		Scottish League Cup		Total	
Club	Season	Division	Apps	Goals	Apps	Goals	Apps	Goals	Apps	Goals
Forfar Athletic	1982–83	Scottish Second Division	12	3	—		—		12	3
Forfar Athletic	1983–84	Scottish Second Division	36	22	2	2	4	1	42	25
Forfar Athletic	1984–85	Scottish First Division	35	11	3	0	1	0	39	11
Forfar Athletic	1985–86	Scottish First Division	24	8	1	0	2	1	37	9
Forfar Athletic	Total		107	44	6	2	7	2	120	48
Hamilton Academical	1986–87	Scottish Premier Division	9	3	—		1	0	10	3
Career total			116	47	6	2	8	2	130	51

== Honours ==
Forfar Athletic

- Scottish League Second Division: 1983–84

Individual

- Cowdenbeath Hall of Fame
