= 1937–38 Dumbarton F.C. season =

Dumbarton
1937–1938 season
- Stadium: Boghead Park, Dumbarton
- Scottish League Division Two: 7th
- Scottish Cup: First Round
- Top goalscorer: League: Jimmy Smith (29); All: Jimmy Smith (29)

The 1937–38 season was the 61st Scottish football season in which Dumbarton competed at national level, entering the Scottish Football League and the Scottish Cup.

== Scottish League ==
Dumbarton made another encouraging start to their 15th season in a row in the Second Division, with only one defeat in their first 8 games. Although that form wasn't maintained fully, Dumbarton had their best season for a number of years by finishing 7th out of 18, with 39 points – 20 behind champions Raith Rovers. For the fifth time, Dumbarton maintained an unbeaten home league record, but with only 3 wins from 17 fixtures away from Boghead, promotion was never going to be a real possibility.

| 14 August 1937 League | Brechin City | 3–4 | Dumbarton | Glebe Park, Brechin |
| | McMahon 4'; Cargill 29' (pen.); Deans 57' (OG) | | Smith, J 18', 48', 69'; Murray 56' | Attendance: 1,100; Referee: A Henderson |

| 21 August 1937 League | Dumbarton | 5–1 | Stenhousemuir | Boghead Park |
| | Smith, G 10', 35', 40'; Smith, J 28' (pen.); Duffy 62' | | Hutchison 32' (pen.) | Attendance: 3,500; Referee: A Cockburn |

| 28 August 1937 League | East Stirling | 2–2 | Dumbarton | Firs Park |
| | Meechan 3'; Beath 67' | | Smith, G 40'; Murray 76' | Referee: W Murray |

| 4 September 1937 League | Dumbarton | 5–1 | Dundee United | Boghead Park |
| | Smith, J 8' (pen.); Murray 15'; Smith, G 44', 71' | | Skelligan 62' (pen.) | Attendance: 4,000; Referee: J Welsh |

| 11 September 1937 League | Forfar Athletic | 4–3 | Dumbarton | Station Park, Forfar |
| | Smith 20'; Bain 58', 61'; Campbell 67' | | Smith, G 9', 80'; Duffy 79' | Attendance: 1,800; Referee: R Carruthers |

| 18 September 1937 League | Dumbarton | 3–0 | Leith Athletic | Boghead Park |
| | Smith, J 1'; Duffy 57'; Robertson 85' | | | Attendance: 4,000; Referee: A Williamson |

| 25 September 1937 League | Airdrie | 1–3 | Dumbarton | Broomfield Park |
| | Murray 15' | | Smith, G 26', 78'; Robertson 35' | Attendance: 4,000; Referee: M Dale |

| 2 October 1937 League | Dumbarton | 4–4 | Cowdenbeath | Boghead Park |
| | Devers 36', 51'; Smith, J 47'; Smith, G 80' | | Watters 25'; Walls 54', 59', 73' | Attendance: 3,000; Referee: A Fair |

| 9 October 1937 League | East Fife | 4–1 | Dumbarton | Bayview Park, Methil |
| | McCartney 20', 43', 60'; McLeod 46' | | Duffy 42' | Attendance: 2,000; Referee: J Provan |

| 16 October 1937 League | Dumbarton | 2–2 | Raith Rovers | Boghead Park |
| | Smith, J 2'; Robertson 36' | | Joyner 23'; Gilmour 50' | Attendance: 5,000; Referee: R Carruthers |

| 23 October 1937 League | Dunfermline Athletic | 4–1 | Dumbarton | East End Park, Dunfermline |
| | Robertson,R 12'; Hinchcliffe 440' (80); Ferguson 67' | | Robertson 57' | Attendance: 3,000; Referee: A Fair |

| 30 October 1937 League | King's Park | 1–0 | Dumbarton | Forthbank Park |
| | 18' | | | Attendance: 1,500; Referee: H Stokes |

| 6 November 1937 League | Dumbarton | 3–2 | Albion Rovers | Boghead Park |
| | Robertson 57'; Smith, G 64'; Smith, J 69' | | Burke 2', 89' | Attendance: 6,500; Referee: T Fyfe |

| 13 November 1937 League | Alloa Athletic | 2–1 | Dumbarton | Recreation Park, Alloa |
| | Torbet 40'; Kay 75' | | Smith, J 85' | Referee: J Mackay |

| 20 November 1937 League | Dumbarton | 4–0 | Montrose | Boghead Park |
| | Duffy 33', 65'; Masson 44' (OG); Smith, J 90' (pen.) | | | Attendance: 4,000; Referee: C Faultless |

| 27 November 1937 League | St Bernard's | 1–0 | Dumbarton | Royal Gymnasium Ground |
| | Kemp 77' | | | Attendance: 1,000; Referee: A Cunningham |

| 4 December 1937 League | Dumbarton | 7–0 | Brechin City | Boghead Park |
| | Smith, J 40', 67', 70'; Duffy 42', 57'; Smith, G 45'; Murray 90' | | | Attendance: 2,000; Referee: W Gilchrist |

| 18 December 1937 League | Dumbarton | 3–2 | East Fife | Boghead Park |
| | Smith, J 25'; Duffy; Smith, G | | McCartney 33' | Attendance: 2,000; Referee: J Mackay |

| 25 December 1937 League | Stenhousemuir | 4–2 | Dumbarton | Ochilview Park |
| | Cowan 50', 55'; Rae 60'; Hill 82' | | Smith, G 20'; Smith, J 67' | Referee: W Gilchrist |

| 1 January 1938 League | Dumbarton | 2–0 | Forfar Athletic | Boghead Park |
| | Smith, G 1'; Duffy 45' | | | Attendance: 4,500; Referee: W McCall |

| 3 January 1938 League | Cowdenbeath | 4–1 | Dumbarton | Central Park, Cowdenbeath |
| | Goal | | Duffy | Attendance: 4,000 |

| 8 January 1938 League | Leith Athletic | 2–0 | Dumbarton | Old Meadowbank |
| | Kinnear 72' (pen.); Murphy 90' | | | Attendance: 2,000; Referee: A Henderson |

| 15 January 1938 League | Dumbarton | 3–1 | East Stirling | Boghead Park |
| | Smith, G 13'; Duffy; Cochrane | | Ross | Attendance: 2,500; Referee: J Welsh |

| 29 January 1938 League | Dundee United | 1–4 | Dumbarton | Tannadice Park |
| | Rumbles 11' | | Smith, J 14', 28'; Smith, G 70'; Robertson 89' | Attendance: 2,000; Referee: A Cunningham |

| 5 February 1938 League | Dumbarton | 8–1 | Edinburgh City | Boghead Park |
| | Smith, J 3', 57'; Smith, G 7', 50', 70', 87'; Robertson 76', 86' | | Anderson 21' | Attendance: 2,500; Referee: C Faultless |

| 12 February 1938 League | Montrose | 0–0 | Dumbarton | Links Park |
| | | | | Referee: M Dale |

| 19 February 1938 League | Raith Rovers | 7–0 | Dumbarton | Starks Park |
| | Haywood 5', 59', 85'; Whitelaw 25'; Gilmour 51', 55', 78' | | | Attendance: 5,000; Referee: A Williamson |

| 26 February 1938 League | Dumbarton | 4–1 | King's Park | Boghead Park |
| | Trialist 20'; Smith, J 35', 88'; Smith, G 53' | | Brooks 40' | Attendance: 1,500 |

| 12 March 1938 League | Dumbarton | 4–1 | Dunfermline Athletic | Boghead Park |
| | Smith, J Smith, G | | Izatt 77' | Attendance: 5,000; Referee: A Cockburn |

| 19 March 1938 League | Albion Rovers | 3–0 | Dumbarton | Cliftonhill |
| | Keirnan 39'; Bell 80'; Burke 82' | | | Attendance: 5,000; Referee: W Gilchrist |

| 26 March 1938 League | Dumbarton | 2–1 | St Bernard's | Boghead Park |
| | Smith, G 23'; Smith, J 59' | | Flucher 83' | Attendance: 4,000; Referee: W Murray |

| 2 April 1938 League | Edinburgh City | 4–0 | Dumbarton | East Pilton, Edinburgh |
| | White 7'; Cuthbert 40', 49'; McLeod 66' | | | Attendance: 4,000; Referee: J Mackay |

| 9 April 1938 League | Dumbarton | 2–0 | Airdrie | Boghead Park |
| | Robertson 10'; Smith, G 86' | | | Attendance: 5,000; Referee: M Dale |

| 16 April 1938 League | Dumbarton | 2–2 | Alloa Athletic | Boghead Park |
| | Smith, J 3'; Kemp 57' | | Jamieson 50'; McPate 65' | Attendance: 3,000; Referee: J Welsh |

== Scottish Cup ==
Dumbarton came up against first division Kilmarnock in the first round and despite a good fight were to finish up second best.

| 22 January 1938 Cup R1 | Kilmarnock | 6–0 | Dumbarton | Rugby Park |
| | Candy 36'; Reid 43', 77'; Thomson 51', 57'; Fyfe 85' | | | Attendance: 9,000; Referee: J Baillie |

== Friendly ==
| 5 March 1938 Friendly | Dumbarton | 3–3 | East Stirling | Boghead Park |
| | Smith, G 30' (pen.); Trialist | | Roughead 15' | Attendance: 1,000; Referee: R McBeath |

== Player statistics ==
| No. | Pos | Nat | Player | Total | | Second Division | | Scottish Cup | |
| No. | Pos | Nat | Player | Apps | Goals | Apps | Goals | Apps | Goals |
|---|---|---|---|---|---|---|---|---|---|
| | GK | (Scotland) SCO | William Morrison | 24 | 0 | 23 | 0 | 1 | 0 |
| | GK | (Scotland) SCO | Robert Muir | 11 | 0 | 11 | 0 | 0 | 0 |
| | DF | (Scotland) SCO | John Casey | 31 | 0 | 30 | 0 | 1 | 0 |
| | DF | (Scotland) SCO | John Clay | 32 | 0 | 31 | 0 | 1 | 0 |
| | DF | (Scotland) SCO | James McKain | 7 | 0 | 7 | 0 | 0 | 0 |
| | MF | (Scotland) SCO | Daniel Clancy | 19 | 0 | 18 | 0 | 1 | 0 |
| | MF | (Scotland) SCO | Coleman | 1 | 0 | 1 | 0 | 0 | 0 |
| | MF | (Scotland) SCO | John Curley | 2 | 0 | 2 | 0 | 0 | 0 |
| | MF | (Scotland) SCO | William Deans | 7 | 0 | 7 | 0 | 0 | 0 |
| | MF | (Scotland) SCO | Ferguson | 1 | 0 | 1 | 0 | 0 | 0 |
| | MF | (Scotland) SCO | John Irvine | 13 | 0 | 13 | 0 | 0 | 0 |
| | MF | (Scotland) SCO | William Kemp | 11 | 1 | 11 | 1 | 0 | 0 |
| | MF | (Scotland) SCO | James McAllister | 21 | 0 | 20 | 0 | 1 | 0 |
| | MF | (Scotland) SCO | David Muir | 2 | 0 | 2 | 0 | 0 | 0 |
| | MF | (Scotland) SCO | Stephen Murray | 28 | 4 | 27 | 4 | 1 | 0 |
| | MF | (Scotland) SCO | Willie White | 19 | 0 | 18 | 0 | 1 | 0 |
| | FW | (Scotland) SCO | Sandy Cochrane | 15 | 1 | 15 | 1 | 0 | 0 |
| | FW | (Scotland) SCO | Thomas Devers | 7 | 2 | 7 | 2 | 0 | 0 |
| | FW | (Scotland) SCO | Archibald Duffy | 26 | 12 | 25 | 12 | 1 | 0 |
| | FW | (Scotland) SCO | Abram Robertson | 34 | 9 | 33 | 9 | 1 | 0 |
| | FW | (Scotland) SCO | Gavin Smith | 35 | 25 | 34 | 25 | 1 | 0 |
| | FW | (Scotland) SCO | Jimmy Smith | 35 | 29 | 34 | 29 | 1 | 0 |
| | FW | (Scotland) SCO | Sneddon | 2 | 0 | 2 | 0 | 0 | 0 |
| | FW | (Scotland) SCO | Trialist | 2 | 0 | 2 | 0 | 0 | 0 |

=== Transfers ===
==== Players in ====
| Player | From | Date |
|---|---|---|
| (Scotland) William Deans | (Scotland) Cowdenbeath | 28 May 1937 |
| (Scotland) Robert Muir | (Scotland) Alloa Athletic | 4 Jun 1937 |
| (Scotland) Gavin Smith | (Scotland) Pollok | 15 Jun 1937 |
| (Scotland) Willie White | (Scotland) Kirkintilloch Rob Roy | 25 Jun 1937 |
| (Scotland) John Clay | (Scotland) Morton | 1 Jul 1937 |
| (Scotland) John Irvine | (Scotland) Alloa Athletic | 1 Jul 1937 |
| (Scotland) William Kemp | (Scotland) Dumbarton Harp | 10 Aug 1937 |
| (Scotland) James McKain | (Scotland) | 10 Aug 1937 |
| (Scotland) Jimmy Smith | (England) Notts County | 10 Aug 1937 |
| (Scotland) Thomas Devers | (Scotland) Aberdeen | 23 Sep 1937 |
| (Scotland) John Curley | (Scotland) Morton | 24 Aug 1937 |
| (Scotland) William Morrison | (Scotland) St Anthony's | 2 Nov 1937 |
| (Scotland) Sandy Cochrane | (Scotland) East Stirling | 17 Nov 1937 |
| (Scotland) James McAllister | (Scotland) Airdrie | 17 Nov 1937 |
| (Scotland) Daniel Clancy | (Scotland) Ayr United | 19 Nov 1937 |
| (Scotland) David Muir | (Scotland) St Mirren | 1 Jan 1938 |

==== Players out ====
| Player | To | Date |
|---|---|---|
| (Scotland) John Irvine | (Scotland) released | 22 Nov 1937 |
| (Scotland) Thomas Devers | (Scotland) released | 3 Dec 1937 |
| (Scotland) Robert Muir | (Scotland) | 3 Dec 1937 |
| (Scotland) William Deans | (Scotland) King's Park | 31 Dec 1937 |
| (Scotland) David Muir | (Scotland) released | 6 Jan 1938 |
| (Scotland) Joseph Jackson | (Scotland) released | 26 Jan 1938 |
| (Scotland) Edward McDonnell | (Scotland) Clyde | |
| (Scotland) Peter McMahon | (Scotland) Brechin City | |
| (Scotland) Andrew Sinclair | (Scotland) King's Park | |
| (Scotland) Martin Watson | (Scotland) King's Park | |

In addition John Glass, James Mitchell, David Ogilvie, Willie Parlane, Alex Scott and Alex Young all played their last games in Dumbarton 'colours'.
