= 1946–47 Rangers F.C. season =

Rangers
1946–47 season
- Chairman: James Bowie
- Manager: Bill Struth
- Ground: Ibrox Park
- Scottish League Division One: 1st P30 W21 D4 L5 F76 A26 Pts46
- Scottish Cup: Second round
- League Cup: Winners
- Top goalscorer: League: Willie Thornton, Jimmy Duncanson (18); All: Willie Thornton, Jimmy Duncanson (25)
Home colours	Away colours

The 1946–47 season was the 67th season of competitive football by Rangers.

== Overview ==
Rangers played a total of 43 competitive matches during the 1946–47 season. This was the first official season played since the end of the Second World War. The club played in the Scottish League Division A and won the championship (25th title) with 46 points. They scored 76 goals during the campaign and conceded only 26 in the 30 matches. Willie Thornton finished top scorer with 19 goals.

Rangers were successful in the newly inaugurated League Cup.They won all six matches in their Section before overcoming Dundee United from Division B in a 2 leg Quarter-Final. Hibernian were beaten 3–1 in the Semi-Final in front of a crowd of 125,154. Rangers defeated Aberdeen 4–0 in the Final at Hampden Park with Jimmy Duncanson netting a brace.

The Scottish Cup campaign ended at the Second Round stage. The club were knocked out in a replay by Hibernian at Easter Road.[1]

Jock Shaw, Willie Waddell and Willie Thornton represented Scotland against England in a match in aid of the Burnden Park Disaster victims.

== Transfers ==
6 August 1946: Charlie Johnstone to Queen of the South. John Galloway to Chelsea.

1 May 1947: Dougie Gray and Jimmy Smith were given free transfers.

== Results ==
All results are written with Rangers' score first.

=== Scottish League Division A ===
Date	Opponent	Venue	Result	Attendance	Scorers
A	4-2	30,000	Duncanson (2), Thornton, Waddell		
H	1-2	50,000	Young (pen)		
H	3-2	25,000	Cox, Gillick, Waddell		
A	5-0		Thornton (3), Duncanson, Waddell		
H	8-1	22,000	Thornton (3), Caskie (3), Gillick, Duncanson		
H	2-0	20,000	Duncanson (2)		
A	0-1	35,000			
A	3-2	28,000	Duncanson (2), Parlane		
H	4-0	15,000	Duncanson (3), Gillick		
A	2-3	36,000	Gillick, Duncanson		
H	2-1	40,000	Thornton, Cox		
A	6-0	15,000	Thornton (3), McNee, Gillick, Duncanson		
A	4-2	27,000	McNee, McColl, Duncanson, Thornton		
H	2-1	10,000	Thornton, Gillick		
A	3-0	44,532	Duncanson, McNee, Thornton		
H	2-1	35,000	Thornton, Young (pen)		
A	1-1	41,378	Duncanson		
H	2-1	15,000	Duncanson, Gillick		
A	1-1	35,000	Gillick		
H	1-1	85,000	Gillick		
A	2-0	32,325	Gillick (2)		
A	0-1	18,000			
H	4-0	18,000	Waddell, Thornton, Young (pen), Gillick		
H	1-0	60,000	Waddell		
A	0-0	40,000			
A	2-0	11,000	Young (pen), Arnison		
A	1-0	18,000	Thornton		
H	5-0	15,000	Williamson (4), Rutherford		
H	1-2	12,000	Thornton		
H	4-1	8,000	Williamson (2), Parlane, Duncanson		

=== Scottish Cup ===
Date	Round	Opponent	Venue	Result	Attendance	Scorers
R1	Clyde	H	2–1	74,606	Duncanson, Thornton	
R2	Hibernian	H	0–0	95,000		
R2 R	Hibernian	A	0–2	48,816		

=== League Cup ===
Date	Round	Opponent	Venue	Result	Attendance	Scorers
SR	St Mirren	H	4–0	20,000	Arnison (2), Cox, Stead	
SR	Queen's Park	A	4–2	30,000	Duncanson (2), Gillick, Thornton	
SR	Morton	H	3–0	50,000	Duncanson, Caskie, Thornton	
SR	St Mirren	A	4–0	20,000	Gillick (2), Thornton (2)	
SR	Queen's Park	H	1–0	20,000	Arnison	
SR	Morton	A	2–0	18,000	Young (pen.), Thornton	
QF	Dundee United	H	2–1	40,000	Waddell, Caskie	
QF	Dundee United	A	1–1	18,000	Duncanson	
SF	Hibernian	N	3–1	125,154	Gillick, Thornton, Waddell	
F	Aberdeen	N	4–0	82,684	Duncanson (2), Gillick, Williamson	

== Appearances ==
Player	Position	Appearances	Goals
(Scotland) Bobby Brown	GK	42	0
(Scotland) Sammy Cox	DF	18	3
(Scotland) Jock Shaw	DF	41	0
(Scotland) Charlie Watkins	MF	9	0
(Scotland) George Young	DF	40	5
(Scotland) Scot Symon	MF	12	0
(Scotland) William Waddell	MF	32	7
(Scotland) Torrance Gillick	MF	37	17
(Scotland) Willie Thornton	FW	34	25
(Scotland) Jimmy Duncanson	FW	38	25
(Scotland) Jimmy Caskie	MF	22	5
(Scotland) David Gray	DF	11	0
(Scotland) Billy Williamson	FW	9	7
(South Africa) Billy Arnison	FW	10	4
(Scotland) Angus Stead	FW	4	1
(Scotland) Jimmy Parlane	FW	6	2
(Scotland) Willie Woodburn	DF	29	0
(Scotland) Ian McColl	DF	29	1
(Scotland) Willie Rae	MF	27	0
(Scotland) Chris McNee	MF	10	3
(Scotland) Eddie Rutherford	MF	7	1
(Scotland) John Lindsay	DF	2	0
(Scotland) John Shaw	GK	1	0

== See also ==
- 1946–47 in Scottish football
- 1946–47 Scottish Cup
- 1946–47 Scottish League Cup

== General references ==
- Docherty, David. The Rangers Companion. ISBN 085976172X.
