= 1938–39 Scottish Division Two =

Scottish Second Division
- Season: 1938–39
- Champions: Cowdenbeath

The 1938–39 Scottish Division Two was won by Cowdenbeath. Edinburgh City finished bottom.

It was the last season of play until the 1946–47 season due to World War II; and it would be the final Scottish League season for King's Park and for St Bernard's, because of the difficulties they encountered during the war years.

== Table ==
Pos	Team	Pld	W	D	L	GF	GA	GD	Pts	Qualification
1	Cowdenbeath (Note: Team was promoted to Division One for the abandoned 1939–40 season, but was not included in Division A when the official competitions resumed in 1946–47.)	34	28	4	2	120	45	+75	60	
2	Alloa Athletic	34	22	4	8	91	46	+45	48	
3	East Fife	34	21	6	7	99	61	+38	48	
4	Airdrieonians	34	21	5	8	85	57	+28	47	
5	Dunfermline Athletic	34	18	5	11	99	78	+21	41	
6	Dundee	34	15	7	12	99	63	+36	37	
7	St Bernard's (Note: Team did not return to the league when official competitions resumed in 1946–47.)	34	15	6	13	39	39	0	36	Left the League
8	Stenhousemuir	34	15	5	14	74	69	+5	35	
9	Dundee United	34	15	3	16	78	69	+9	33	
10	Brechin City (Note: Team was included in Division C in 1946–47.)	34	11	9	14	82	106	−24	31	Relegated to the 1946–47 Division C
11	Dumbarton	34	9	12	13	68	76	−8	30	
12	Morton (Note: Team was included in Division A in 1946–47.)	34	11	6	17	74	88	−14	28	Promoted to the 1946–47 Division A
13	King's Park	34	12	2	20	87	92	−5	26	Left the League
14	Montrose	34	10	5	19	82	96	−14	25	Relegated to the 1946–47 Division C
15	Forfar Athletic	34	11	3	20	74	138	−64	25	Relegated to the 1946–47 Division C
16	Leith Athletic	34	10	4	20	57	83	−26	24	Relegated to the 1946–47 Division C
17	East Stirlingshire	34	9	4	21	89	130	−41	22	Relegated to the 1946–47 Division C
18	Edinburgh City	34	6	4	24	58	119	−61	16	Relegated to the 1946–47 Division C

Source: "1938-1939 Division 2 - SPFL Archive". SPFL.
