= 1982–83 Scottish First Division =

Scottish First Division
- Season: 1982–83
- Champions: St Johnstone
- Promoted: St Johnstone; Hearts
- Relegated: Dunfermline Athletic; Queen's Park
- Top goalscorer: Bobby Williamson (23)

The 1982–83 Scottish First Division season was won by St Johnstone by one point over nearest rival Hearts. Both clubs were promoted to the Premier Division.

== League table ==
Pos	Team	Pld	W	D	L	GF	GA	GD	Pts	Promotion or relegation
1	St Johnstone (C, P)	39	25	5	9	59	37	+22	55	Promotion to the Premier Division
2	Heart of Midlothian (P)	39	22	10	7	79	38	+41	54	Promotion to the Premier Division
3	Clydebank	39	20	10	9	72	49	+23	50	
4	Partick Thistle	39	20	9	10	66	45	+21	49	
5	Airdrieonians	39	16	7	16	62	46	+16	39	
6	Alloa Athletic	39	14	11	14	52	52	0	39	
7	Dumbarton	39	13	10	16	50	59	−9	36	
8	Falkirk	39	15	6	18	45	55	−10	36	
9	Raith Rovers	39	13	8	18	64	63	+1	34	
10	Clyde	39	14	6	19	55	66	−11	34	
11	Hamilton Academical	39	11	12	16	54	66	−12	34	
12	Ayr United	39	12	8	19	45	61	−16	32	
13	Dunfermline Athletic (R)	39	7	17	15	39	69	−30	31	Relegation to the Second Division
14	Queen's Park (R)	39	6	11	22	44	80	−36	23	Relegation to the Second Division

Source: RSSSF
Rules for classification: 1) points; 2) goal difference; 3) number of goals scored.
(C) Champions; (P) Promoted; (R) Relegated

== Promotion ==
St Johnstone and Hearts finished 1st and second respectively and were promoted to the 1983–84 Scottish Premier Division.

== Relegation ==
Dunfermline Athletic and Queen's Park finished 13th and 14th respectively and were relegated to the 1983–84 Scottish Second Division.
