= 1938–39 Scottish Football League =

Scottish football season

Statistics of the Scottish Football League in season 1938–39.

== Scottish League Division One ==
Pos	Team	Pld	W	D	L	GF	GA	GD	Pts
1	Rangers	38	25	9	4	112	55	+57	59
2	Celtic	38	20	8	10	99	53	+46	48
3	Aberdeen	38	20	6	12	91	61	+30	46
4	Heart of Midlothian	38	20	5	13	98	70	+28	45
5	Falkirk	38	19	7	12	73	63	+10	45
6	Queen of the South	38	17	9	12	70	64	+6	43
7	Hamilton Academical	38	18	5	15	67	71	−4	41
8	St Johnstone (Note: Team remained in Division One for the abandoned 1939–40 season, but was not included in Division A when the official competitions resumed in 1946–47.)	38	17	6	15	85	83	+2	40
9	Clyde	38	17	5	16	78	70	+8	39
10	Kilmarnock	38	15	9	14	73	86	−13	39
11	Partick Thistle	38	17	4	17	74	87	−13	38
12	Motherwell	38	16	5	17	82	86	−4	37
13	Hibernian	38	14	7	17	68	69	−1	35
14	Ayr United	38	13	9	16	76	83	−7	35
15	Third Lanark	38	12	8	18	80	96	−16	32
16	Albion Rovers	38	12	6	20	65	90	−25	30
17	Arbroath	38	11	8	19	54	75	−21	30
18	St Mirren	38	11	7	20	57	80	−23	29
19	Queen's Park (Note: Team was relegated to Division Two for the abandoned 1939–40 season, but were included in Division A when the official competitions resumed in 1946–47.)	38	11	5	22	57	83	−26	27
20	Raith Rovers (Note: Team relegated to Division Two in 1939–40 and was also in Division B in 1946–47.)	38	10	2	26	65	99	−34	22

Source: RSSSF

== Scottish League Division Two ==
Pos	Team	Pld	W	D	L	GF	GA	GD	Pts
1	Cowdenbeath (Note: Team was promoted to Division One for the abandoned 1939–40 season, but was not included in Division A when the official competitions resumed in 1946–47.)	34	28	4	2	120	45	+75	60
2	Alloa Athletic	34	22	4	8	91	46	+45	48
3	East Fife	34	21	6	7	99	61	+38	48
4	Airdrieonians	34	21	5	8	85	57	+28	47
5	Dunfermline Athletic	34	18	5	11	99	78	+21	41
6	Dundee	34	15	7	12	99	63	+36	37
7	St Bernard's (Note: Team did not return to the league when official competitions resumed in 1946–47.)	38	15	6	17	39	39	0	36
8	Stenhousemuir	34	15	5	14	74	69	+5	35
9	Dundee United	34	15	3	16	78	69	+9	33
10	Brechin City (Note: Team was included in Division C in 1946–47.)	34	11	9	14	82	106	−24	31
11	Dumbarton	34	9	12	13	68	76	−8	30
12	Morton (Note: Team was included in Division A in 1946–47.)	34	11	6	17	74	88	−14	28
13	King's Park	34	12	2	20	87	92	−5	26
14	Montrose	34	10	5	19	82	96	−14	25
15	Forfar Athletic	34	11	3	20	74	138	−64	25
16	Leith Athletic	34	10	4	20	57	83	−26	24
17	East Stirlingshire	34	9	4	21	89	130	−41	22
18	Edinburgh City	34	6	4	24	58	119	−61	16

Source: "1938-1939 Division 2 - SPFL Archive". SPFL.

== See also ==
- 1938–39 in Scottish football
