= 1978–79 Scottish First Division =

Scottish First Division
- Season: 1978–79
- Champions: Dundee
- Promoted: Dundee; Kilmarnock
- Relegated: Montrose; Queen of the South
- Matches played: 273
- Goals scored: 830 (3.04 per match)
- Top goalscorer: Blair Millar (28)
- Biggest home win: Airdrieonians 8–2 Montrose, 05.05.1979
- Biggest away win: Arbroath 0–5 Raith Rovers, 30.09.1978

The 1978–79 Scottish First Division season was won by Dundee, who were promoted along with Kilmarnock to the Premier Division. Montrose and Queen of the South were relegated to the Second Division.

== League table ==
Pos	Team	Pld	W	D	L	GF	GA	GD	Pts	Promotion or relegation
1	Dundee (C, P)	39	24	7	8	69	36	+33	55	Promotion to the Premier Division
2	Kilmarnock (P)	39	22	10	7	72	36	+36	54	Promotion to the Premier Division
3	Clydebank	39	24	6	9	78	50	+28	54	
4	Ayr United	39	21	5	13	73	54	+19	47	
5	Hamilton Academical	39	17	9	13	63	61	+2	43	
6	Airdrieonians	39	16	8	15	72	61	+11	40	
7	Dumbarton	39	14	11	14	58	50	+8	39	
8	Stirling Albion	39	13	9	17	43	55	−12	35	
9	Clyde	39	13	8	18	54	65	−11	34	
10	Arbroath	39	11	11	17	50	61	−11	33	
11	Raith Rovers	39	12	8	19	48	55	−7	32	
12	St Johnstone	39	10	11	18	57	66	−9	31	
13	Montrose (R)	39	8	9	22	55	92	−37	25	Relegation to the Second Division
14	Queen of the South (R)	39	8	8	23	43	93	−50	24	Relegation to the Second Division

Source: RSSSF and statto
Rules for classification: 1) points; 2) goal difference; 3) number of goals scored.
(C) Champions; (P) Promoted; (R) Relegated
