= Donald Hunter =

Donald Hunter may refer to:

- Donald Hunter (footballer, born 1927) (1927–2008), footballer for Huddersfield Town, Halifax Town & Southport
- Donald Hunter (footballer, born 1955), Scottish former footballer for Alloa Athletic
- Donald Hunter (physician) (1898–1978), British physician and author
- Donald Hunter (judge) (1911–1991), Chief Justice of the Indiana Supreme Court
- Donald Hunter (character), a superhero, better known as Huntsman, in The League of Champions comics
- Don Hunter (artist), New Zealand artist and art educator
