= 1938–39 in Scottish football =

Football in Scotland
- Season: 1938–39

1938–39 in Scottish football

Division One champions
- Rangers

Division Two champions
- Cowdenbeath

Scottish Cup winners
- Clyde

Junior Cup winners
- Rutherglen Glencairn

Scotland national team
- 1939 BHC

The 1938–39 season was the 66th season of competitive football in Scotland and the 49th season of the Scottish Football League. Due to the World War II the league was not officially competed for again until the 1946–47 season.

== Scottish League Division One ==
Pos	Team	Pld	W	D	L	GF	GA	GD	Pts	Qualification or relegation
1	Rangers	38	25	9	4	112	55	+57	59	
2	Celtic	38	20	8	10	99	53	+46	48	
3	Aberdeen	38	20	6	12	91	61	+30	46	
4	Heart of Midlothian	38	20	5	13	98	70	+28	45	
5	Falkirk	38	19	7	12	73	63	+10	45	
6	Queen of the South	38	17	9	12	70	64	+6	43	
7	Hamilton Academical	38	18	5	15	67	71	−4	41	
8	St Johnstone (Note: Team remained in Division One for the abandoned 1939–40 season, but was not included in Division A when the official competitions resumed in 1946–47.)	38	17	6	15	85	83	+2	40	Relegated to the 1946–47 Division B
9	Clyde	38	17	5	16	78	70	+8	39	
10	Kilmarnock	38	15	9	14	73	86	−13	39	
11	Partick Thistle	38	17	4	17	74	87	−13	38	
12	Motherwell	38	16	5	17	82	86	−4	37	
13	Hibernian	38	14	7	17	68	69	−1	35	
14	Ayr United	38	13	9	16	76	83	−7	35	Relegated to the 1946–47 Division B
15	Third Lanark	38	12	8	18	80	96	−16	32	
16	Albion Rovers	38	12	6	20	65	90	−25	30	Relegated to the 1946–47 Division B
17	Arbroath	38	11	8	19	54	75	−21	30	Relegated to the 1946–47 Division B
18	St Mirren	38	11	7	20	57	80	−23	29	
19	Queen's Park (Note: Team was relegated to Division Two for the abandoned 1939–40 season, but were included in Division A when the official competitions resumed in 1946–47.)	38	11	5	22	57	83	−26	27	
20	Raith Rovers (Note: Team relegated to Division Two in 1939–40 and was also in Division B in 1946–47.)	38	10	2	26	65	99	−34	22	Relegated to the 1946–47 Division B

Source: RSSSF

Champions: Rangers

== Scottish League Division Two ==
Pos	Team	Pld	W	D	L	GF	GA	GD	Pts	Qualification
1	Cowdenbeath (Note: Team was promoted to Division One for the abandoned 1939–40 season, but was not included in Division A when the official competitions resumed in 1946–47.)	34	28	4	2	120	45	+75	60	
2	Alloa Athletic	34	22	4	8	91	46	+45	48	
3	East Fife	34	21	6	7	99	61	+38	48	
4	Airdrieonians	34	21	5	8	85	57	+28	47	
5	Dunfermline Athletic	34	18	5	11	99	78	+21	41	
6	Dundee	34	15	7	12	99	63	+36	37	
7	St Bernard's (Note: Team did not return to the league when official competitions resumed in 1946–47.)	34	15	6	13	39	39	0	36	Left the League
8	Stenhousemuir	34	15	5	14	74	69	+5	35	
9	Dundee United	34	15	3	16	78	69	+9	33	
10	Brechin City (Note: Team was included in Division C in 1946–47.)	34	11	9	14	82	106	−24	31	Relegated to the 1946–47 Division C
11	Dumbarton	34	9	12	13	68	76	−8	30	
12	Morton (Note: Team was included in Division A in 1946–47.)	34	11	6	17	74	88	−14	28	Promoted to the 1946–47 Division A
13	King's Park	34	12	2	20	87	92	−5	26	Left the League
14	Montrose	34	10	5	19	82	96	−14	25	Relegated to the 1946–47 Division C
15	Forfar Athletic	34	11	3	20	74	138	−64	25	Relegated to the 1946–47 Division C
16	Leith Athletic	34	10	4	20	57	83	−26	24	Relegated to the 1946–47 Division C
17	East Stirlingshire	34	9	4	21	89	130	−41	22	Relegated to the 1946–47 Division C
18	Edinburgh City	34	6	4	24	58	119	−61	16	Relegated to the 1946–47 Division C

Source: "1938-1939 Division 2 - SPFL Archive". SPFL.

== Scottish Cup ==
Clyde were winners of the Scottish Cup after a 4–0 win over Motherwell.

== Other Honours ==
=== National ===
Competition	Winner	Score	Runner-up
Scottish Qualifying Cup - North	Clachnacuddin	5 – 3	Babcock & Wilcox
Scottish Qualifying Cup - South	Penicuik Athletic	5 – 3	St Cuthbert Wanderers

=== County ===
Competition	Winner	Score	Runner-up
Aberdeenshire Cup	Buckie Thistle	7 – 6 *	Peterhead
Ayrshire Cup	Ayr United	5 – 3 *	Kilmarnock
East of Scotland Shield	Hibernian	3 – 1	Hearts
Fife Cup	Dunfermline Athletic	1 – 1	Raith Rovers
Forfarshire Cup	Arbroath	2 – 0	Dundee United
Glasgow Cup	Celtic	3 – 0	Clyde
Lanarkshire Cup	Hamilton	5 – 1	Airdrie
Perthshire Cup	Blairgowrie	10 – 6 *	Breadalbane
Renfrewshire Cup	Morton	2 – 1	St Mirren
Southern Counties Cup	Stranraer	8 – 5	Solway Star

- * - aggregate over two legs

=== Highland League ===
Top Three
Pos	Team	Pld	W	D	L	GF	GA	GD	Pts
1	Clachnacuddin	26	18	3	5	88	46	+42	39
2	Buckie Thistle	26	17	2	7	82	47	+35	36
3	Elgin City	26	14	3	9	75	57	+18	31

== Junior Cup ==
Rutherglen Glencairn were winners of the Junior Cup after a 1–0 win over Shawfield in the final.

== Scotland national team ==
Date	Venue	Opponents	Score	Competition	Scotland scorer(s)
8 October 1938	Windsor Park, Belfast (A)	Northern Ireland	2–0	BHC	Jimmy Delaney, Tommy Walker
9 November 1938	Tynecastle Park, Edinburgh (H)	Wales	3–2	BHC	Tommy Walker (2), Torrance Gillick
7 December 1938	Ibrox Stadium, Glasgow (H)	Hungary	3–1	Friendly	Tommy Walker (pen.), Andy Black, Torrance Gillick
15 April 1939	Hampden Park, Glasgow (H)	England	1–2	BHC	James Dougall

Scotland were joint winners of the 1939 British Home Championship with England and Wales

Key:

- (H) = Home match
- (A) = Away match
- BHC = British Home Championship
