= 1984–85 Scottish First Division =

Scottish First Division
- Season: 1984–85
- Champions: Motherwell
- Promoted: Motherwell; Clydebank
- Relegated: Meadowbank Thistle; St Johnstone
- Matches played: 273
- Goals scored: 757 (2.77 per match)
- Top goalscorer: Gerry McCoy (22)
- Biggest home win: Clydebank 5–0 Kilmarnock, 15.09.1984
- Biggest away win: Kilmarnock 0–5 Airdrieonians, 29.09.1984

The 1984–85 Scottish First Division season was won by Motherwell, who were promoted along with Clydebank to the Premier Division. Meadowbank Thistle and St Johnstone were relegated to the Second Division.

== League table ==
Pos	Team	Pld	W	D	L	GF	GA	GD	Pts	Promotion or relegation
1	Motherwell (C, P)	39	21	8	10	62	26	+36	50	Promotion to the Premier Division
2	Clydebank (P)	39	17	14	8	57	37	+20	48	Promotion to the Premier Division
3	Falkirk	39	19	7	13	65	54	+11	45	
4	Hamilton Academical	39	16	11	12	48	49	−1	43	
5	Airdrieonians	39	17	8	14	70	59	+11	42	
6	Forfar Athletic	39	14	13	12	54	49	+5	41	
7	Ayr United	39	15	9	15	57	52	+5	39	
8	Clyde	39	14	11	14	47	48	−1	39	
9	Brechin City	39	14	9	16	49	57	−8	37	
10	East Fife	39	12	12	15	55	56	−1	36	
11	Partick Thistle	39	13	9	17	50	55	−5	35	
12	Kilmarnock	39	12	10	17	42	61	−19	34	
13	Meadowbank Thistle (R)	39	11	10	18	50	66	−16	32	Relegation to the Second Division
14	St Johnstone (R)	39	10	5	24	51	79	−28	25	Relegation to the Second Division

Source: RSSSF and statto
Rules for classification: 1) points; 2) goal difference; 3) number of goals scored.
(C) Champions; (P) Promoted; (R) Relegated
