= 1925–26 Scottish Division Three =

Scottish Football League Third Division
- Season: 1925–26
- Champions: championship withheld
- Promoted: Forfar Athletic F.C.

The 1925–26 Scottish Third Division was not completed as multiple clubs were unable to complete their fixtures due to the costs of meeting match guarantees and travel and other expenses being beyond their capacity to pay.

As a result, the championship was withheld, with the Third Division being dissolved: it would not be re-established until the 1946–47 season.

However, Forfar Athletic were promoted to the Scottish Second Division.

== Table ==
Pos	Team	Pld	W	D	L	GF	GA	GR	Pts	Promotion or relegation
1	Helensburgh	30	16	6	8	66	47	1.404	38	
2	Leith Athletic	29	16	5	8	73	41	1.780	37	
3	Forfar Athletic (P)	28	16	3	9	61	42	1.452	35	Elected to the 1926–27 Scottish Division Two
4	Dykehead	28	14	5	9	62	47	1.319	33	
5	Royal Albert	28	16	1	11	75	61	1.230	33	
6	Mid-Annandale	29	14	3	12	50	54	0.926	31	
7	Vale of Leven	26	14	2	10	78	55	1.418	30	
8	Montrose	26	12	3	11	56	58	0.966	27	
9	Lochgelly United	29	9	9	11	58	63	0.921	27	
10	Brechin City	28	12	3	13	67	73	0.918	27	
11	Solway Star	29	9	6	14	50	62	0.806	24	
12	Beith	27	9	4	14	58	68	0.853	22	
13	Johnstone	29	7	6	16	55	74	0.743	20	
14	Peebles Rovers	26	9	0	17	52	76	0.684	18	
15	Clackmannan	25	5	8	12	42	74	0.568	18	
16	Galston	15	4	4	7	38	46	0.826	12	

Source: statto.com
Rules for classification: Teams are ranked by points then goal average. Points system: 2 points for a win, 1 point for a draw, 0 points for a loss
(P) Promoted
Location of teams in 1925–26 Scottish Division Three
