= Willie Rae (footballer, born 1924) =

Scottish footballer (1924–1982)

Personal information
- Full name: William Walker Rae
- Date of birth: 16 June 1924
- Place of birth: Glasgow, Scotland
- Date of death: 1982 (aged 57)
- Place of death: New Kilpatrick, Scotland
- Position: Wing half

Youth career
- Petershill

Senior career*
Years	Team	Apps	(Gls)
1945–1956	Rangers	131	(6)
1956–1958	Queen of the South	14	(0)
Total		145	(6)
- * Club domestic league appearances and goals

William Walker Rae (16 June 1924 – 16 May 1982) was a Scottish footballer who played in the 1940s and 1950s. Rae played junior football for Petershill before joining Rangers in 1945. He played in 131 league matches for Rangers before moving to Queen of the South in 1956.

Rae died in New Kilpatrick in 1982, at the age of 57.
