= Nathan James Fraser =

Scottish footballer

James Fraser
Personal information
- Full name: Nathan James Fraser
- Date of birth: 16 April 1913
- Place of birth: Glasgow, Scotland
- Date of death: 1997 (aged 84)
- Place of death: Dorset, England
- Height: 6 ft 0 in (1.83 m)
- Position: Inside forward

Youth career
- Ashfield

Senior career*
Years	Team	Apps	(Gls)
1936–1937	Blackburn Rovers		
1937–1938	Wrexham		
1938–1939	Dumbarton	3	(3)
1938–1939	Stenhousemuir		
- * Club domestic league appearances and goals

Nathan James Fraser (16 April 1913 – 1997) was a Scottish footballer who played for Blackburn Rovers, Wrexham, Dumbarton and Stenhousemuir.
