= Ian Campbell (footballer, born 1953) =

Scottish footballer and manager

Personal information
- Date of birth: 22 November 1953 (age 72)
- Place of birth: Dunfermline, Scotland
- Position: Forward

Team information
- Current team: East Fife F.C. (assistant manager)

Youth career
- Lochore Welfare

Senior career*
Years	Team	Apps	(Gls)
1973–1975	Dunfermline Athletic	44	(11)
1975–1976	Arbroath	1	(0)
1976–1977	Cowdenbeath	28	(3)
1977–1985	Brechin City	282	(125)
1985–1987	Dunfermline Athletic	50	(16)
1986–1987	→ Montrose (loan)	4	(0)

Managerial career
- 2005–2006: Brechin City
- * Club domestic league appearances and goals

Ian Campbell (born 22 November 1953) is a Scottish football former player and manager. His twin brother Dick Campbell is also a football player and manager, and the two currently manage Scottish League 1 side East Fife.

== Playing career ==
As a player Campbell was a noted lower division forward whose 131 goals in all competitions established the individual record for a player with Brechin City. He had previously appeared for Dunfermline Athletic and Arbroath and went on to appear for Cowdenbeath, Dunfermline again and Montrose before retiring. During his career, Campbell was promoted with Brechin and helped Dunfermline to achieve promotion twice.

== Coaching career ==
In a coaching career spanning 25 years, Campbell has helped Dunfermline achieve promotion to the Scottish Premier League three times, saw Brechin City promoted three times and Forfar once.

Campbell managed Brechin City between 2005 and 2006, succeeding his brother Dick to whom he had been assistant. Brechin struggled in the First Division which was mainly made up of full-time clubs and as they sat at the bottom of the table his tenure was ended towards the end of the season. He became the assistant manager of Forfar Athletic in 2008, again working for his twin brother. Ian took temporary charge of the team in 2011, when his brother underwent treatment for cancer. He left Forfar in June 2014 to concentrate on his business commitments.

Campbell also works closely with the Scottish Football Association delivering courses to assist the development of coaches and managers.

== Business career ==
Campbell has also pursued a career in business, joining CR Smith after his playing career and progressing from personnel manager to operations director and then managing director.

In 1993, Campbell set up Avenue Scotland as part of the Creyfs Group, where he became group managing director, looking after 46 recruitment companies across Europe. In 2001, he left his post with the Creyfs Group to focus his efforts on Avenue Scotland Group, which now includes Avenue Recruitment, Avenue Care Services, Avenue Logistics as well as Avenue Consultancy - a specialist business consultancy working with companies across the UK.

Campbell is also a director of Hotel Connexxions.

As of June 2014, he was managing director of Human Resources, a company based in Dunfermline.

Campbell is also a director of Fife-based Curtain Walling and Commercial Glazing company, Avtek Solutions.
