= 1937–38 Scottish Division Two =

Scottish Second Division
- Season: 1937–38
- Champions: Raith Rovers
- Promoted: Raith Rovers; Albion Rovers

The 1937–38 Scottish Second Division was won by Raith Rovers who, along with second placed Albion Rovers, were promoted to the First Division. Brechin City finished bottom.

== Table ==
| Pos | Team | Pld | W | D | L | GF | GA | GD | Pts | Promotion or relegation |
|---|---|---|---|---|---|---|---|---|---|---|
| 1 | Raith Rovers | 34 | 27 | 5 | 2 | 142 | 54 | +88 | 59 | Promotion to the 1938–39 First Division |
| 2 | Albion Rovers | 34 | 20 | 8 | 6 | 97 | 50 | +47 | 48 | Promotion to the 1938–39 First Division |
| 3 | Airdrieonians | 34 | 21 | 5 | 8 | 100 | 53 | +47 | 47 | |
| 4 | St Bernard's | 34 | 20 | 5 | 9 | 75 | 49 | +26 | 45 | |
| 5 | Cowdenbeath | 34 | 17 | 9 | 8 | 115 | 71 | +44 | 43 | |
| 6 | East Fife | 34 | 19 | 5 | 10 | 94 | 61 | +33 | 43 | |
| 7 | Dumbarton | 34 | 17 | 5 | 12 | 85 | 66 | +19 | 39 | |
| 8 | Stenhousemuir | 34 | 17 | 5 | 12 | 87 | 78 | +9 | 39 | |
| 9 | Dunfermline Athletic | 34 | 17 | 5 | 12 | 82 | 76 | +6 | 39 | |
| 10 | Leith Athletic | 34 | 16 | 5 | 13 | 71 | 56 | +15 | 37 | |
| 11 | Alloa Athletic | 34 | 11 | 4 | 19 | 78 | 106 | −28 | 26 | |
| 12 | King's Park | 34 | 11 | 4 | 19 | 64 | 96 | −32 | 26 | |
| 13 | East Stirlingshire | 34 | 9 | 7 | 18 | 55 | 95 | −40 | 25 | |
| 14 | Dundee United | 34 | 9 | 5 | 20 | 69 | 104 | −35 | 23 | |
| 15 | Forfar Athletic | 34 | 8 | 6 | 20 | 67 | 100 | −33 | 22 | |
| 16 | Montrose | 34 | 7 | 8 | 19 | 56 | 88 | −32 | 22 | |
| 17 | Edinburgh City | 34 | 7 | 3 | 24 | 77 | 125 | −48 | 17 | |
| 18 | Brechin City | 34 | 5 | 2 | 27 | 53 | 139 | −86 | 12 | |

Source: "1937-1938 Division 2 - SPFL Archive". SPFL.
