= Gavin Smith (footballer, born 1915) =

Scottish footballer (1915–1992)

Personal information
- Date of birth: 25 September 1915
- Place of birth: Cambuslang, Scotland
- Date of death: October 1992 (aged 77)
- Position: Outside right

Senior career*
Years	Team	Apps	(Gls)
1937–1939	Dumbarton	60	(29)
1938–1939	Barnsley		
- * Club domestic league appearances and goals

Gavin Smith (25 September 1915 – October 1992) was a professional footballer who played for Dumbarton and Barnsley.
