= Steve Hancock =

English footballer

Personal information
- Date of birth: 10 September 1953 (age 73)
- Place of birth: Sheffield, England
- Position: Forward

Senior career*
Years	Team	Apps	(Gls)
- Newtongrange Star
1971–1974	Celtic	0	(0)
1974–1975	Sheffield Wednesday	0	(0)
1974–1975	Hearts	4	(0)
1976–1979	Meadowbank Thistle	101	(14)
1979–1981	Stenhousemuir	77	(31)
1981–1983	Forfar Athletic	39	(10)
Total		221	(55)
- * Club domestic league appearances and goals

Steve Hancock (born 10 September 1953) is an English former professional footballer who played as a forward.

== Career ==
Born in Sheffield, Hancock played for Newtongrange Star, Celtic, Sheffield Wednesday, Hearts, Meadowbank Thistle Stenhousemuir and Forfar Athletic.
