= 1978–79 Scottish Second Division =

Scottish Second Division
- Season: 1978–79
- Champions: Berwick Rangers
- Promoted: Berwick Rangers; Dunfermline Athletic

The 1978–79 Scottish Second Division was won by Berwick Rangers who, along with second placed Dunfermline Athletic, were promoted to the First Division. Meadowbank Thistle finished bottom.

== Table ==
Pos	Team	Pld	W	D	L	GF	GA	GD	Pts	Promotion
1	Berwick Rangers (C, P)	39	22	10	7	82	44	+38	54	Promotion to the First Division
2	Dunfermline Athletic (P)	39	19	14	6	66	40	+26	52	Promotion to the First Division
3	Falkirk	39	19	12	8	66	37	+29	50	
4	East Fife	39	17	9	13	64	53	+11	43	
5	Cowdenbeath	39	16	10	13	63	58	+5	42	
6	Alloa Athletic	39	16	9	14	57	62	−5	41	
7	Albion Rovers	39	15	10	14	57	56	+1	40	
8	Forfar Athletic	39	13	12	14	55	52	+3	38	
9	Stranraer	39	18	2	19	52	66	−14	38	
10	Stenhousemuir	39	12	8	19	54	58	−4	32	
11	Brechin City	39	9	14	16	49	65	−16	32	
12	East Stirlingshire	39	12	8	19	61	87	−26	32	
13	Queen's Park	39	8	12	19	46	57	−11	28	
14	Meadowbank Thistle	39	8	8	23	37	74	−37	24	

Source: "1978-1979 Second Division - SPFL Archive". SPFL.
Rules for classification: 1) points; 2) goal difference; 3) number of goals scored.
(C) Champions; (P) Promoted
