= Jimmy Smith (footballer, born 1902) =

Scottish footballer

Personal information
- Full name: James Terence Smith
- Date of birth: 20 June 1902
- Place of birth: Old Kilpatrick, Scotland
- Date of death: 1975 (aged 72–73)
- Place of death: Bridgeport, CT, United States
- Position: Striker

Senior career*
Years	Team	Apps	(Gls)
1919–1925	Dumbarton Harp		
1925–1926	Clydebank	30	(11)
1926–1927	Rangers	2	(0)
1927–1929	Ayr United	76	(97)
1929–1932	Liverpool	61	(38)
1932–1933	Tunbridge Wells Rangers		
1933–1935	Bristol Rovers	31	(17)
1935–1936	Newport County	27	(10)
1936–1937	Notts County	1	(1)
1937–1947	Dumbarton	52	(36)

Managerial career
- 1937–1946: Dumbarton
- * Club domestic league appearances and goals

James Terence Smith (20 June 1902 – 1975) was a Scottish footballer who played for Liverpool from 1929 to 1931.

Smith scored 66 goals in 38 appearances in the 1927–28 Scottish Division Two season with Ayr United, a British record to date.

He was Liverpool's top scorer during the 1929–30 season, scoring 23 goals in all competitions. His move into Non-League football next season was a big shock to the football world but season 1932–33 was spent in the Southern League with Tunbridge Wells Rangers. The following season, he went to Bristol Rovers then Newport County followed by Notts County then he completed the circle in 1937 by returning to Scotland with Dumbarton.
