= 1946–47 Scottish Division C =

Scottish Division C
- Season: 1946–47
- Champions: Stirling Albion
- Promoted: Stirling Albion; Leith Athletic

The 1946–47 Scottish Division C was won by Stirling Albion who, along with third placed Leith Athletic, were promoted to Division B. Edinburgh City finished bottom. It was the first season after World War II. It was the first season of the reformed third-tier since 1925–26 and featured three reserve teams.

== Table ==
Pos	Team	Pld	W	D	L	GF	GA	GD	Pts	Promotion or relegation
1	Stirling Albion	18	13	4	1	66	22	+44	30	Promotion to the 1947–48 Division B
2	Dundee 'A' (Note: 'A' teams were not eligible for promotion from Division C.)	18	12	2	4	60	37	+23	26	Left the League
3	Leith Athletic	18	11	3	4	57	33	+24	25	Promotion to the 1947–48 Division B
4	East Stirlingshire	18	10	2	6	54	40	+14	22	
5	St Johnstone 'A'	18	8	5	5	52	37	+15	21	
6	Forfar Athletic	18	6	2	10	32	46	−14	14	
7	Montrose	18	5	2	11	39	53	−14	12	
8	Brechin City	18	4	4	10	42	60	−18	12	
9	Dundee United 'A'	18	3	3	12	42	77	−35	9	
10	Edinburgh City	18	3	3	12	36	75	−39	9	
