= Alex Bone (footballer) =

Scottish footballer

Personal information
- Date of birth: 26 December 1971 (age 54)
- Place of birth: Stirling, Scotland
- Position: Forward

Senior career*
| Years | Team | Apps | (Gls) |
| 1992–1995 | St Mirren | 72 | (8) |
| 1995–1999 | Stirling Albion | 113 | (61) |
| 1999–2000 | Ayr United | 9 | (2) |
| 2000 | → Stirling Albion (loan) | 9 | (4) |
| 2000 | → Ross County (loan) | 6 | (4) |
| 2000–2003 | Ross County | 71 | (25) |
| 2003 | Peterhead | 14 | (9) |
| 2003–2004 | Elgin City | 37 | (18) |
| 2004–2007 | Clachnacuddin | | |
| 2007–2008 | Forres Mechanics | | |
| 2008–2009 | Muir of Ord Rovers | | |
| 2009–2010 | Golspie Sutherland | | |
| 2010–2012 | Kinnoull | | |
- * Club domestic league appearances and goals

Alexander Bone (born 26 December 1971) is a Scottish retired footballer who played as a forward.

== Career ==
Bone began his career with St Mirren before moving to Stirling Albion in the mid-1990s. Bone went on to score more than a goal every two games for the Albion before winning an £80,000 move to Ayr United in 1999. Despite scoring on his début for Ayr, Bone spent the final few months of the season on loan, spending time back at Stirling and then latterly at Ross County. Such was his impact at County – he scored in the final four matches of the season – that he moved there on a permanent deal for the start of the next season. Months into his permanent spell, Bone received a five-match ban for accumulating three red cards in a match. Bone stayed at Victoria Park until early 2003 when he moved to Peterhead on a short-term deal, before spending just over a year with Elgin City. Shortly into the 2004-05 season, Bone joined Clachnacuddin, spending three years with The Lilywhites. In the summer of 2007, Bone moved on to Forres Mechanics. In 2008, Bone left Forres for Muir of Ord Rovers in the North Caledonian League before joining league rivals Golspie Sutherland the season after, before heading back South to join Kinnoull.

In a 2004 poll by the BBC, Bone came third in a vote to find Stirling Albion's all-time hero.

Bone is the nephew of former Scotland player Jimmy Bone.
