= 1979–80 Scottish Second Division =

Scottish Second Division
- Season: 1979–80
- Champions: Falkirk
- Promoted: Falkirk; East Stirlingshire

The 1979–80 Scottish Second Division was won by Falkirk who, along with second placed East Stirlingshire, were promoted to the First Division. Alloa Athletic finished bottom.

== Table ==
Pos	Team	Pld	W	D	L	GF	GA	GD	Pts	Promotion
1	Falkirk (C, P)	39	19	12	8	65	35	+30	50	Promotion to the First Division
2	East Stirlingshire (P)	39	21	7	11	55	40	+15	49	Promotion to the First Division
3	Forfar Athletic	39	19	8	12	63	51	+12	46	
4	Albion Rovers	39	16	12	11	73	56	+17	44	
5	Queen's Park	39	16	9	14	59	47	+12	41	
6	Stenhousemuir	39	16	9	14	56	51	+5	41	
7	Brechin City	39	15	10	14	61	59	+2	40	
8	Cowdenbeath	39	14	12	13	54	52	+2	40	
9	Montrose	39	14	10	15	60	63	−3	38	
10	East Fife	39	12	9	18	45	57	−12	33	
11	Stranraer	39	12	8	19	51	65	−14	32	
12	Meadowbank Thistle	39	12	8	19	42	70	−28	32	
13	Queen of the South	39	11	9	19	51	69	−18	31	
14	Alloa Athletic	39	11	7	21	44	64	−20	29	

Source: "1979-1980 Second Division - SPFL Archive". SPFL.
Rules for classification: 1) points; 2) goal difference; 3) number of goals scored.
(C) Champions; (P) Promoted
