= 1987–88 Scottish Second Division =

Scottish Second Division
- Season: 1987–88
- Champions: Ayr United
- Promoted: Ayr United; St Johnstone

The 1987–88 Scottish Second Division was won by Ayr United who, along with second placed St Johnstone, were promoted to the First Division. Stranraer finished bottom.

== Table ==
Pos	Team	Pld	W	D	L	GF	GA	GD	Pts	Promotion
1	Ayr United (C, P)	39	27	7	5	95	31	+64	61	Promotion to the First Division
2	St Johnstone (P)	39	26	9	4	75	23	+52	61	Promotion to the First Division
3	Queen's Park	39	21	9	9	64	44	+20	51	
4	Brechin City	39	20	8	11	56	40	+16	48	
5	Stirling Albion	39	18	10	11	60	51	+9	46	
6	East Stirlingshire	39	15	13	11	52	48	+4	43	
7	Alloa Athletic	39	16	8	15	50	46	+4	40	
8	Montrose	39	12	11	16	45	51	−6	35	
9	Arbroath	39	10	14	15	54	66	−12	34	
10	Stenhousemuir	39	12	9	18	49	58	−9	33	
11	Cowdenbeath	39	9	13	17	50	67	−17	31	
12	Albion Rovers	39	10	11	18	45	75	−30	31	
13	Berwick Rangers	39	6	4	29	33	78	−45	16	
14	Stranraer	39	4	8	27	34	84	−50	16	

Source: "1987-1988 Second Division - SPFL Archive". SPFL.
Rules for classification: 1) points; 2) goal difference; 3) number of goals scored.
(C) Champions; (P) Promoted
