= 1983–84 Scottish Second Division =

Scottish Second Division
- Season: 1983–84
- Champions: Forfar Athletic
- Promoted: Forfar Athletic; East Fife

The 1983–84 Scottish Second Division was won by Forfar Athletic who, along with second placed East Fife, were promoted to the First Division. Albion Rovers finished bottom.

== Table ==
Pos	Team	Pld	W	D	L	GF	GA	GD	Pts	Promotion
1	Forfar Athletic (C, P)	39	27	9	3	73	31	+42	63	Promotion to the First Division
2	East Fife (P)	39	20	7	12	57	43	+14	47	Promotion to the First Division
3	Berwick Rangers	39	16	11	12	56	38	+18	43	
4	Stirling Albion	39	14	14	11	51	41	+10	42	
5	Arbroath	39	18	6	15	51	46	+5	42	
6	Queen of the South	39	16	10	13	51	46	+5	42	
7	Stenhousemuir	39	14	11	14	47	57	−10	39	
8	Stranraer	39	13	12	14	47	47	0	38	
9	Dunfermline Athletic	39	13	10	16	44	45	−1	36	
10	Queen's Park	39	14	8	17	58	63	−5	36	
11	East Stirlingshire	39	10	11	18	52	66	−14	31	
12	Montrose	39	12	7	20	36	56	−20	31	
13	Cowdenbeath	39	10	9	20	44	58	−14	29	
14	Albion Rovers	39	8	11	20	46	76	−30	27	

Source: "1983-1984 Second Division - SPFL Archive". SPFL.
Rules for classification: 1) points; 2) goal difference; 3) number of goals scored.
(C) Champions; (P) Promoted
