= 1984–85 Scottish Second Division =

Scottish Second Division
- Season: 1984–85
- Champions: Montrose
- Promoted: Montrose; Alloa Athletic

The 1984–85 Scottish Second Division was won by Montrose who, along with second placed Alloa Athletic, were promoted to the First Division. Arbroath finished bottom.

== Table ==
Pos	Team	Pld	W	D	L	GF	GA	GD	Pts	Promotion
1	Montrose (C, P)	39	22	9	8	57	40	+17	53	Promotion to the First Division
2	Alloa Athletic (P)	39	20	10	9	58	40	+18	50	Promotion to the First Division
3	Dunfermline Athletic	39	17	15	7	61	36	+25	49	
4	Cowdenbeath	39	18	11	10	68	39	+29	47	
5	Stenhousemuir	39	15	15	9	45	43	+2	45	
6	Stirling Albion	39	15	13	11	62	47	+15	43	
7	Raith Rovers	39	18	6	15	69	57	+12	42	
8	Queen of the South	39	10	14	15	42	56	−14	34	
9	Albion Rovers	39	13	8	18	49	72	−23	34	
10	Queen's Park	39	12	9	18	48	55	−7	33	
11	Stranraer	39	13	6	20	52	67	−15	32	
12	East Stirlingshire	39	8	15	16	38	53	−15	31	
13	Berwick Rangers	39	8	12	19	36	49	−13	28	
14	Arbroath	39	9	7	23	35	66	−31	25	

Source: "1984-1985 Second Division - SPFL Archive". SPFL (in Malay).
Rules for classification: 1) points; 2) goal difference; 3) number of goals scored.
(C) Champions; (P) Promoted
