= 1982–83 Scottish Second Division =

Scottish Second Division
- Season: 1982–83
- Champions: Brechin City
- Promoted: Brechin City; Meadowbank Thistle

The 1982–83 Scottish Second Division was won by Brechin City who, along with second placed Meadowbank Thistle, were promoted to the First Division. Montrose finished bottom.

== Table ==
Pos	Team	Pld	W	D	L	GF	GA	GD	Pts	Promotion
1	Brechin City (C, P)	39	21	13	5	77	38	+39	55	Promotion to the First Division
2	Meadowbank Thistle (P)	39	23	8	8	64	45	+19	54	Promotion to the First Division
3	Arbroath	39	21	7	11	78	51	+27	49	
4	Forfar Athletic	39	18	12	9	58	38	+20	48	
5	Stirling Albion	39	18	10	11	57	41	+16	46	
6	East Fife	39	16	11	12	68	43	+25	43	
7	Queen of the South	39	17	8	14	75	55	+20	42	
8	Cowdenbeath	39	13	12	14	54	53	+1	38	
9	Berwick Rangers	39	13	10	16	47	60	−13	36	
10	Albion Rovers	39	14	6	19	55	66	−11	34	
11	Stenhousemuir	39	7	15	17	43	66	−23	29	
12	Stranraer	39	10	7	22	46	79	−33	27	
13	East Stirlingshire	39	7	9	23	41	79	−38	23	
14	Montrose	39	8	6	25	37	86	−49	22	

Source: "1982-1983 Second Division - SPFL Archive". SPFL.
Rules for classification: 1) points; 2) goal difference; 3) number of goals scored.
(C) Champions; (P) Promoted
