= 1985–86 Scottish Second Division =

Scottish Second Division
- Season: 1985–86
- Champions: Dunfermline Athletic
- Promoted: Dunfermline Athletic; Queen of the South

The 1985–86 Scottish Second Division was won by Dunfermline Athletic who, along with second placed Queen of the South, were promoted to the First Division. Stranraer finished bottom.

== Table ==
Pos	Team	Pld	W	D	L	GF	GA	GD	Pts	Promotion
1	Dunfermline Athletic (C, P)	39	23	11	5	91	47	+44	57	Promotion to the First Division
2	Queen of the South (P)	39	23	9	7	71	36	+35	55	Promotion to the First Division
3	Meadowbank Thistle	39	19	11	9	68	45	+23	49	
4	Queen's Park	39	19	8	12	61	39	+22	46	
5	Stirling Albion	39	18	8	13	57	53	+4	44	
6	St Johnstone	39	18	6	15	63	55	+8	42	
7	Stenhousemuir	39	16	8	15	55	63	−8	40	
8	Arbroath	39	15	9	15	56	50	+6	39	
9	Raith Rovers	39	15	7	17	67	65	+2	37	
10	Cowdenbeath	39	14	9	16	52	53	−1	37	
11	East Stirlingshire	39	11	6	22	49	69	−20	28	
12	Berwick Rangers	39	7	11	21	45	80	−35	25	
13	Albion Rovers	39	8	8	23	38	86	−48	24	
14	Stranraer	39	9	5	25	41	83	−42	23	

Source: "1985-1986 Second Division - SPFL Archive". SPFL.
Rules for classification: 1) points; 2) goal difference; 3) number of goals scored.
(C) Champions; (P) Promoted
