= 1946–47 in Scottish football =

Division A champions
- Rangers

Division B champions
- Dundee

Division C champions
- Stirling Albion

Scottish Cup winners
- Aberdeen

League Cup winners
- Rangers

Division C League Cup winners
- Stirling Albion

Junior Cup winners
- Shawfield

Scotland national team
- 1947 BHC

The 1946–47 season was the 74th season of competitive football in Scotland and the 50th season of the Scottish Football League.

== Scottish League Division A ==
| Pos | Team | Pld | W | D | L | GF | GA | GD | Pts |
|---|---|---|---|---|---|---|---|---|---|
| 1 | Rangers | 30 | 21 | 4 | 5 | 76 | 26 | +50 | 46 |
| 2 | Hibernian | 30 | 19 | 6 | 5 | 69 | 33 | +36 | 44 |
| 3 | Aberdeen | 30 | 16 | 7 | 7 | 58 | 41 | +17 | 39 |
| 4 | Hearts | 30 | 16 | 6 | 8 | 52 | 43 | +9 | 38 |
| 5 | Partick Thistle | 30 | 16 | 3 | 11 | 74 | 59 | +15 | 35 |
| 6 | Morton | 30 | 12 | 10 | 8 | 58 | 45 | +13 | 34 |
| 7 | Celtic | 30 | 13 | 6 | 11 | 53 | 55 | −2 | 32 |
| 8 | Motherwell | 30 | 12 | 5 | 13 | 58 | 54 | +4 | 29 |
| 9 | Third Lanark | 30 | 11 | 6 | 13 | 56 | 64 | −8 | 28 |
| 10 | Clyde | 30 | 9 | 9 | 12 | 55 | 65 | −10 | 27 |
| 11 | Falkirk | 30 | 8 | 10 | 12 | 62 | 61 | +1 | 26 |
| 12 | Queen of the South | 30 | 9 | 8 | 13 | 44 | 69 | −25 | 26 |
| 13 | Queen's Park | 30 | 8 | 6 | 16 | 47 | 60 | −13 | 22 |
| 14 | St Mirren | 30 | 9 | 4 | 17 | 47 | 65 | −18 | 22 |
| 15 | Kilmarnock | 30 | 6 | 9 | 15 | 44 | 66 | −22 | 21 |
| 16 | Hamilton Academical | 30 | 2 | 7 | 21 | 38 | 85 | −47 | 11 |

Source: RSSSF

Champions: Rangers

== Scottish League Division B ==
| Pos | Team | Pld | W | D | L | GF | GA | GD | Pts | Promotion or relegation |
|---|---|---|---|---|---|---|---|---|---|---|
| 1 | Dundee | 26 | 21 | 3 | 2 | 113 | 30 | +83 | 45 | Promotion to 1947–48 Division A |
| 2 | Airdrieonians | 26 | 19 | 4 | 3 | 78 | 38 | +40 | 42 | Promotion to 1947–48 Division A |
| 3 | East Fife | 26 | 12 | 7 | 7 | 58 | 39 | +19 | 31 | |
| 4 | Albion Rovers | 26 | 10 | 7 | 9 | 50 | 54 | −4 | 27 | |
| 5 | Alloa Athletic | 26 | 11 | 5 | 10 | 51 | 57 | −6 | 27 | |
| 6 | Raith Rovers | 26 | 10 | 6 | 10 | 45 | 52 | −7 | 26 | |
| 7 | Stenhousemuir | 26 | 8 | 7 | 11 | 43 | 53 | −10 | 23 | |
| 8 | Dunfermline Athletic | 26 | 10 | 3 | 13 | 50 | 72 | −22 | 23 | |
| 9 | St Johnstone | 26 | 9 | 4 | 13 | 45 | 47 | −2 | 22 | |
| 10 | Dundee United | 26 | 9 | 4 | 13 | 53 | 60 | −7 | 22 | |
| 11 | Ayr United | 26 | 9 | 2 | 15 | 56 | 73 | −17 | 20 | |
| 12 | Arbroath | 26 | 7 | 6 | 13 | 42 | 63 | −21 | 20 | |
| 13 | Dumbarton | 26 | 7 | 4 | 15 | 41 | 54 | −13 | 18 | |
| 14 | Cowdenbeath | 26 | 6 | 6 | 14 | 44 | 77 | −33 | 18 | |

== Scottish League Division C ==
| Pos | Team | Pld | W | D | L | GF | GA | GD | Pts | Promotion or relegation |
|---|---|---|---|---|---|---|---|---|---|---|
| 1 | Stirling Albion | 18 | 13 | 4 | 1 | 76 | 66 | +10 | 30 | Promotion to the 1947–48 Division B |
| 2 | Dundee 'A' (Note: 'A' teams were not eligible for promotion from Division C.) | 18 | 12 | 2 | 4 | 60 | 37 | +23 | 26 | |
| 3 | Leith Athletic | 18 | 11 | 3 | 4 | 57 | 33 | +24 | 25 | Promotion to the 1947–48 Division B |
| 4 | East Stirlingshire | 18 | 10 | 2 | 6 | 54 | 40 | +14 | 22 | |
| 5 | St Johnstone 'A' | 18 | 8 | 5 | 5 | 52 | 37 | +15 | 21 | |
| 6 | Forfar Athletic | 18 | 6 | 2 | 10 | 32 | 46 | −14 | 14 | |
| 7 | Montrose | 18 | 5 | 2 | 11 | 39 | 53 | −14 | 12 | |
| 8 | Brechin City | 18 | 4 | 4 | 10 | 42 | 60 | −18 | 12 | |
| 9 | Dundee United 'A' | 18 | 3 | 3 | 12 | 42 | 77 | −35 | 9 | |
| 10 | Edinburgh City | 18 | 3 | 3 | 12 | 36 | 75 | −39 | 9 | |

== Cup honours ==
| Competition | Winner | Score | Runner-up |
|---|---|---|---|
| Scottish Cup 1946–47 | Aberdeen | 2 – 1 | Hibernian |
| Scottish League Cup 1946–47 | Rangers | 4 – 0 | Aberdeen |
| Junior Cup | Shawfield | 2 – 1 (rep.) | Bo'ness United |

== Other Honours ==
=== National ===
| Competition | Winner | Score | Runner-up |
|---|---|---|---|
| B Division Supplementary Cup | East Fife | 7 – 3 * | Raith Rovers |
| Scottish Qualifying Cup - North | Clachnacuddin | 3 – 0 | Inverness Caledonian |
| Scottish Qualifying Cup - South | Berwick Rangers | 3 – 2 | Stranraer |
| Scottish Qualifying Cup - Midlands | Montrose | 3 – 0 <<dagger>> | East Stirling |

=== County ===
| Competition | Winner | Score | Runner-up |
|---|---|---|---|
| Aberdeenshire Cup | Peterhead | 6 – 2 * | Huntly |
| Ayrshire Cup | Kilmarnock | 4 – 2 | Ayr United |
| East of Scotland Shield | Hibernian | 2 – 1 | Hearts |
| Forfarshire Cup | Dundee | 5 – 0 | Dundee United |
| Glasgow Cup | Clyde | 2 – 1 | Third Lanark |
| Perthshire Cup | Breadalbane | | |
| Renfrewshire Cup | St Mirren | 3 – 1 | Morton |
| Southern Counties Cup | Dalbeattie Star | | |

- * - aggregate over two legs

=== Highland League ===
Top Three
| Pos | Team | Pld | W | D | L | GF | GA | GD | Pts |
|---|---|---|---|---|---|---|---|---|---|
| 1 | Peterhead | 30 | 22 | 5 | 3 | 89 | 38 | +51 | 49 |
| 2 | Huntly | 30 | 22 | 3 | 5 | 111 | 68 | +43 | 47 |
| 3 | Clachnacuddin | 30 | 21 | 4 | 5 | 100 | 41 | +59 | 46 |

== Scotland national team ==
| Date | Venue | Opponents | Score | Competition | Scotland scorer(s) |
|---|---|---|---|---|---|
| 19 October 1946 | Racecourse Ground, Wrexham (A) | Wales | 1–3 | BHC | Willie Waddell (pen.) |
| 27 November 1946 | Hampden Park, Glasgow (H) | Northern Ireland | 0–0 | BHC | |
| 12 April 1947 | Wembley Stadium, London (A) | England | 1–1 | BHC | Andy McLaren |
| 18 May 1947 | Heysel Stadium, Brussels (A) | Belgium | 1–2 | Friendly | Billy Steel |
| 24 May 1947 | Stade Municipal, Luxembourg (A) | Luxembourg | 6–0 | Friendly | Andy McLaren (2), Bobby Flavell (2), Billy Steel (2) |

Key:

- (H) = Home match
- (A) = Away match
- BHC = British Home Championship

== See also ==
- 1946–47 Rangers F.C. season
