= 2000–01 Dundee F.C. season =

Dundee
2000–01 season
- Chairman: James Marr
- Manager: Ivano Bonetti
- Stadium: Dens Park
- Scottish Premier League: 6th
- Scottish Cup: Fourth round
- Scottish League Cup: Third round
- Top goalscorer: League: Juan Sara (15); All: Juan Sara (15)
Home colours

During the 2000–01 season, Dundee participated in the Scottish Premier League.

== Season summary ==
Dundee appointed Italian Ivano Bonetti as player-manager, and the midfielder managed to attract a variety of international players, most notably Argentinian World Cup star Claudio Caniggia. Dundee won the first two matches of the season to lead the table, but were unable to sustain the good form and finished the season in sixth, with the undistinguished record of only four home wins all season. Nonetheless, the club did provide supporters with memories to savour, such as wins at both Ibrox and Celtic Park, plus the signing of continental players gave supporters hope of a challenge for European qualification in seasons to come.

== Team kit and sponsors ==
Xara remained Dundee's kit manufacturer, and introduced a new kit for the season. The kit featured predominantly navy shorts for the first time since 1995. The socks were identical to those of the previous season's kit, while the shirt featured a thick white stripe running from the collar down the inside of the sleeves to the cuffs.

== Final league table ==
Pos	Team	Pld	W	D	L	GF	GA	GD	Pts	Qualification or relegation (Note: Teams played each other three times (33 matches), before the league split into two groups (the top six and the bottom six) for the last five matches.)
4	Kilmarnock	38	15	9	14	44	53	−9	54	Qualification for the UEFA Cup qualifying round (Note: As both finalists of the 2000–01 Scottish Cup, Celtic and Hibernian, qualified for European competition via their league position, the cup berth for 2001–02 UEFA Cup was passed to the next-placed team in the league, fourth-placed Kilmarnock.)
5	Heart of Midlothian	38	14	10	14	56	50	+6	52	
6	Dundee	38	13	8	17	51	49	+2	47	Qualification for the UEFA Intertoto Cup first round (Note: Dundee qualified for the 2001 UEFA Intertoto Cup as the highest-placed team to apply for a place in the competition.)
7	Aberdeen	38	11	12	15	45	52	−7	45	
8	Motherwell	38	12	7	19	42	56	−14	43	

Source: Scottish Professional Football League
Rules for classification: 1) Points; 2) Goal difference; 3) Goals scored

== Results ==
Dundee's score comes first

=== Legend ===
Win	Draw	Loss

=== Scottish Premier League ===
Match	Date	Opponent	Venue	Result	Attendance	Scorers
1	29 July 2000	Motherwell	A	2–0	6,161	Billio 8', Artero 86'
2	5 August 2000	Dunfermline Athletic	H	3–0	7,152	Skinner 1' (o.g.), Sara 52', Caballero 55'
3	12 August 2000	Hibernian	A	1–5	12,075	Caballero 9'
4	19 August 2000	St Mirren	A	1–2	5,165	Sara 78'
5	27 August 2000	Heart of Midlothian	H	1–1	6,779	Caballero 58'
6	9 September 2000	Rangers	H	1–1	10,439	Sara 74'
7	16 September 2000	St Johnstone	A	0–0	5,055	
8	20 September 2000	Dundee United	H	3–0	9,838	Sara 47', 80', 88'
9	23 September 2000	Celtic	A	0–1	59,694	
10	30 September 2000	Kilmarnock	H	0–0	6,170	
11	14 October 2000	Aberdeen	A	2–0	14,750	Bonetti 75', Caniggia 90'
12	21 October 2000	Motherwell	H	1–2	7,344	Caniggia 21'
13	28 October 2000	Dunfermline Athletic	A	0–1	6,397	
14	5 November 2000	Hibernian	H	1–2	6,604	Tweed 33'
15	11 November 2000	Dundee United	A	2–0	11,454	Caniggia 38', Nemsadze 73'
16	18 November 2000	St Mirren	H	5–0	6,333	Caniggia 22', 52', Rae 66', Artero 75', Milne 79'
17	25 November 2000	Heart of Midlothian	A	1–3	11,593	Carranza 24'
18	2 December 2000	St Johnstone	H	1–1	7,014	Sara 13'
19	10 December 2000	Celtic	H	1–2	10,763	Boyd 55' (o.g.)
20	16 December 2000	Kilmarnock	A	3–2	6,573	Bonetti 53', Milne 76', 79'
21	23 December 2000	Aberdeen	H	2–2	9,093	Carranza 59', Sara 71'
22	26 December 2000	Motherwell	A	3–0	6,183	Sara 4', 69', Rae 35'
23	2 January 2001	Hibernian	A	0–3	12,379	
24	31 January 2001	Dundee United	H	2–3	11,724	Caniggia 45', Falconer 88'
25	3 February 2001	St Mirren	A	1–2	4,197	Sara 23'
26	21 February 2001	Dunfermline Athletic	H	0–1	6,113	
27	24 February 2001	Rangers	H	0–1	9,778	
28	3 March 2001	St Johnstone	A	3–2	5,064	Rae 56', Sara 68', Artero 86'
29	14 March 2001	Rangers	A	2–0	45,035	Caniggia 14', Milne 90'
30	18 March 2001	Heart of Midlothian	H	0–0	7,327	
31	31 March 2001	Kilmarnock	H	2–2	6,719	Sara 27', Rae 47'
32	4 April 2001	Celtic	A	1–2	59,562	Sara 67'
33	7 April 2001	Aberdeen	A	2–0	11,805	Nemsadze 52', Caballero 63'
34	21 April 2001	Rangers	H	0–3	10,687	
35	29 April 2001	Hibernian	H	0–2	6,659	
36	5 May 2001	Kilmarnock	H	2–1	6,261	Sara 35', Carranza 80'
37	13 May 2001	Celtic	A	2–0	59,435	Caballero 29', 42'
38	20 May 2001	Heart of Midlothian	A	0–2	13,554	

=== Scottish Cup ===
Match	Date	Opponent	Venue	Result	Attendance	Scorers
R3	27 January 2001	Falkirk	H	0–0	6,400	
R3 Replay	12 February 2001	Falkirk	A	2–0	6,068	Sara 71', Caniggia 84'
R4	17 February 2001	Heart of Midlothian	A	1–1	9,970	Sara 30'
R4 Replay	7 March 2001	Heart of Midlothian	H	0–1	7,155	

=== Scottish League Cup ===
Match	Date	Opponent	Venue	Result	Attendance	Scorers
R2	23 August 2000	Montrose	H	3–0	2,635	Wilkie 5', Caballero 56', 66'
R3	5 September 2000	St Mirren	A	0–3	3,988	

== First-team squad ==
Squad at end of season

Note: Flags indicate national team as defined under FIFA eligibility rules; some limited exceptions apply. Players may hold more than one non-FIFA nationality.

No.	Pos.	Nation	Player
1	GK	ITA	Marco Roccati (on loan from Bologna)
2	DF	SCO	Barry Smith
4	DF	SUI	Marcello Marrocco
5	DF	ITA	Marco De Marchi
6	DF	SCO	Steven Tweed
7	FW	ARG	Fabián Caballero
8	MF	ITA	Ivano Bonetti
9	FW	ARG	Juan Sara
10	MF	GEO	Georgi Nemsadze
11	FW	SCO	Willie Falconer
12	MF	SCO	Shaun McSkimming
13	GK	SCO	Jamie Langfield
14	MF	SCO	Gavin Rae
15	FW	SCO	Steven Milne
16	FW	ENG	Michael Yates
17	DF	NED	Frank van Eijs

No.	Pos.	Nation	Player
18	MF	ESP	Javier Artero
19	MF	ITA	Patrizio Billio
20	DF	SCO	Lee Wilkie
21	FW	SCO	Graham Bayne
22	DF	AUS	Chris Coyne
23	MF	AUS	Mark Robertson
24	DF	SCO	Dave Mackay
25	MF	ARG	Beto Carranza
26	DF	ARG	Walter del Río
28	MF	ITA	Marco Russo
29	DF	ITA	Alessandro Romano
30	DF	GEO	Zurab Khizanishvili
33	FW	ARG	Claudio Caniggia
36	DF	ARG	Alberto Garrido
41	DF	SCO	Mark Slater
42	DF	SCO	Gavin Beith

=== Left club during season ===
Note: Flags indicate national team as defined under FIFA eligibility rules; some limited exceptions apply. Players may hold more than one non-FIFA nationality.

No.	Pos.	Nation	Player
1	GK	SCO	Rab Douglas (to Celtic)
3	DF	ENG	Lee Maddison (on loan to Carlisle United)
23	DF	SCO	Hugh Robertson (to Ayr United)
28	DF	SCO	Lee Mair (on loan to East Fife)

No.	Pos.	Nation	Player
31	FW	SCO	Graeme Thomson (released)
32	MF	SCO	Keith Gibson (to East Fife)
38	MF	FR Yugoslavia	Goran Zujovic (released)
—	GK	TRI	Clayton Ince (on loan from Crewe Alexandra)

== Transfers ==
=== In ===
Date	Pos	Name	From	Fee
18 May 2000	MF	(Georgia (country)) Georgi Nemsadze	(Georgia (country)) Dinamo Tbilisi	Unknown
26 May	MF	(Spain) Javier Artero	(Argentina) San Lorenzo	£300,000
1 July	DF	(Switzerland) Marcello Marrocco	(Italy) Modena	Unknown
1 July	DF	(Italy) Marco De Marchi	(Netherlands) Vitesse Arnhem	Free
1 July	FW	(Argentina) Juan Sara	(Paraguay) Cerro Porteño	Free
1 July	FW	(Argentina) Fabián Caballero	(Paraguay) Sol de América	Free
22 August	MF	(Argentina) Walter del Río	(England) Crystal Palace	Unknown
26 August	DF	(Italy) Alessandro Romano	(Italy) Hellas Verona	Free
4 October	FW	(Argentina) Claudio Caniggia	Unattached (last at (Italy) Atalanta)	Free transfer
4 October	MF	(Argentina) Beto Carranza	(Peru) Universitario	?
26 October	GK	(Italy) Marco Roccati	(Italy) Bologna	Season-long loan
16 November	MF	(Italy) Marco Russo	(England) Birmingham City	Free transfer
23 February	DF	(Argentina) Alberto Garrido	Unattached (last at (Spain) Lleida)	Free transfer
8 March	DF	(Georgia (country)) Zurab Khizanishvili	Unattached (last at (Georgia (country)) Lokomotivi Tbilisi)	Free transfer
8 March	MF	(Australia) Mark Robertson	(England) Swindon Town	Free
	MF	(Italy) Ivano Bonetti	(Italy) Sestrese	?

=== Out ===
Date	Pos	Name	To	Fee
1 June	FW	(Scotland) James Grady	(Scotland) Ayr United	?
1 June	FW	(Scotland) Eddie Annand	(Scotland) Ayr United	?
1 August	FW	(Argentina) Martín Prest	(Scotland) Airdrie	?
4 August	FW	(Republic of Ireland) Tommy Coyne	(Scotland) Clydebank	?
18 August	MF	(Scotland) John Elliott	(Scotland) Airdrie	?
19 September	DF	(Scotland) Lee Sharp	(Scotland) St Mirren	?
16 October	GK	(Scotland) Rab Douglas	(Scotland) Celtic	£1,500,000
13 January	MF	(Scotland) Steven Boyack	(Scotland) Hearts	£50,000
25 January	DF	(England) Lee Maddison	(England) Carlisle United	?
1 February	DF	(Scotland) Hugh Robertson	(Scotland) Ross County	?
30 March	MF	(Scotland) Barry Elliot	(Scotland) Partick Thistle	?
