= 1997–98 Dundee F.C. season =

Dundee
1997–98 season
- Manager: John McCormack (until Feb. 1998); Jocky Scott (from Feb. 1998)
- Stadium: Dens Park
- First Division: 1st (champions)
- Scottish Cup: Quarter-finals
- League Cup: Third round
- Challenge Cup: First round
- Top goalscorer: League: James Grady (15); All: James Grady (18)
Home colours

The 1997–98 season was the 96th season in which Dundee competed at a Scottish national level, playing in the Scottish First Division. Dundee would finish as league champions, and would be promoted to the newly revamped Scottish Premier League. Dundee would also compete in the Scottish League Cup, the Scottish Cup and the Scottish Challenge Cup, where they were knocked out by Rangers in the quarter-finals of the Scottish Cup, by Aberdeen in the 3rd round of the League Cup, and by Airdrieonians in the 1st round of the Challenge Cup.

== Scottish First Division ==
Statistics provided by Dee Archive.

| Match day | Date | Opponent | H/A | Score | Dundee scorer(s) | Attendance |
|---|---|---|---|---|---|---|
| 1 | 2 August | Falkirk | H | 3–0 | O'Driscoll, Annand, Elliot | 4,502 |
| 2 | 16 August | Partick Thistle | A | 3–0 | Annand, Grady, Maddison | 2,557 |
| 3 | 23 August | St Mirren | H | 1–0 | Annand | 3,571 |
| 4 | 30 August | Raith Rovers | H | 2–2 | Grady, Annand | 4,461 |
| 5 | 13 September | Ayr United | A | 2–1 | Annand, Anderson (pen.) | 2,180 |
| 6 | 20 September | Hamilton Academical | H | 0–2 | | 3,611 |
| 7 | 27 September | Greenock Morton | A | 2–0 | Kelly, Anderson | 2,342 |
| 8 | 4 October | Airdrieonians | H | 1–0 | Rogers | 3,086 |
| 9 | 18 October | Stirling Albion | A | 2–1 | Anderson, Smith | 1,538 |
| 10 | 25 October | Falkirk | A | 1–1 | Elliot | 4,076 |
| 11 | 1 November | Partick Thistle | H | 0–0 | | 3,560 |
| 12 | 8 November | Raith Rovers | A | 1–0 | | 4,763 |
| 13 | 15 November | Ayr United | H | 4–0 | Grady (2), Annand, Kelly | 2,921 |
| 14 | 22 November | Greenock Morton | H | 0–1 | | 3,489 |
| 15 | 29 November | Hamilton Academical | A | 4–0 | Grady (3) (pen.), McCulloch (o.g.) | 1,967 |
| 16 | 6 December | Airdrieonians | A | 0–0 | | 1,966 |
| 17 | 13 December | Stirling Albion | H | 0–0 | | 2,751 |
| 18 | 20 December | St Mirren | A | 2–0 | Anderson, Grady | 3,165 |
| 19 | 27 December | Falkirk | H | 0–1 | | 5,074 |
| 20 | 3 January | Raith Rovers | H | 1–1 | Anderson | 5,304 |
| 21 | 10 January | Ayr United | A | 5–2 | Irvine, Grady (3), McCormick | 2,068 |
| 22 | 17 January | Greenock Morton | A | 0–0 | | 2,200 |
| 23 | 31 January | Hamilton Academical | H | 1–1 | McCormick | 3,028 |
| 24 | 7 February | Stirling Albion | A | 3–1 | McGlashan, McCormick, Grady | 1,632 |
| 25 | 21 February | Airdrieonians | H | 1–0 | McCormick | 3,239 |
| 26 | 25 February | Partick Thistle | A | 2–1 | Annand (2) | 2,422 |
| 27 | 28 February | St Mirren | H | 1–0 | Grady | 3,365 |
| 28 | 14 March | Greenock Morton | H | 2–0 | Anderson, Adamczuk | 3,432 |
| 29 | 21 March | Hamilton Academical | A | 2–1 | Grady, Robertson | 1,180 |
| 30 | 28 March | Stirling Albion | H | 2–0 | Annand (2) | 3,142 |
| 31 | 4 April | Airdrieonians | A | 2–1 | Annand, McCormick | 2,058 |
| 32 | 11 April | Raith Rovers | A | 1–1 | Annand | 6,984 |
| 33 | 18 April | Ayr United | H | 1–1 | Grady (pen.) | 8,104 |
| 34 | 25 April | Falkirk | A | 0–1 | | 4,169 |
| 35 | 2 May | Partick Thistle | H | 0–3 | | 3,609 |
| 36 | 9 May | St Mirren | A | 0–1 | | 2,460 |

=== League table ===
| Pos | Team | Pld | W | D | L | GF | GA | GD | Pts | Promotion or relegation |
|---|---|---|---|---|---|---|---|---|---|---|
| 1 | Dundee (C, P) | 36 | 20 | 10 | 6 | 52 | 24 | +28 | 70 | Promotion to the Premier League |
| 2 | Falkirk | 36 | 19 | 8 | 9 | 56 | 41 | +15 | 65 | |
| 3 | Raith Rovers | 36 | 17 | 9 | 10 | 51 | 33 | +18 | 60 | |
| 4 | Airdrieonians | 36 | 16 | 12 | 8 | 42 | 35 | +7 | 60 | |
| 5 | Greenock Morton | 36 | 12 | 10 | 14 | 40 | 47 | −7 | 46 | |

Source: RSSSF
Rules for classification: 1) points; 2) goal difference; 3) number of goals scored.
(C) Champions; (P) Promoted

== Scottish League Cup ==
Statistics provided by Dee Archive.

| Match day | Date | Opponent | H/A | Score | Dundee scorer(s) | Attendance |
|---|---|---|---|---|---|---|
| 2nd round | 9 August | East Stirlingshire | H | 1–0 | O'Driscoll | 2,515 |
| 3rd round | 19 August | Aberdeen | H | 0–3 | | 7,457 |

== Scottish Cup ==
Statistics provided by Dee Archive.

| Match day | Date | Opponent | H/A | Score | Dundee scorer(s) | Attendance |
|---|---|---|---|---|---|---|
| 3rd round | 25 January | St Mirren | H | 4–2 | McCormick, Grady (2), Maddison | 4,877 |
| 4th round | 14 February | Ross County | A | 1–1 | McGlashan | 4,500 |
| 4R replay | 17 February | Ross County | H | 3–0 | Annand (2), Raeside | 4,307 |
| Quarter-finals | 9 March | Rangers | A | 0–0 | | 40,309 |
| QF replay | 18 March | Rangers | H | 1–2 | Grady | 12,418 |

== Scottish Challenge Cup ==
Statistics provided by Dee Archive.

| Match day | Date | Opponent | H/A | Score | Dundee scorer(s) | Attendance |
|---|---|---|---|---|---|---|
| 1st round | 13 August | Airdrieonians | A | 0–1 | | 799 |

== Player statistics ==
Statistics provided by Dee Archive

| No. | Pos | Nat | Player | Total | | First Division | | Scottish Cup | | League Cup | | Challenge Cup | |
| No. | Pos | Nat | Player | Apps | Goals | Apps | Goals | Apps | Goals | Apps | Goals | Apps | Goals |
|---|---|---|---|---|---|---|---|---|---|---|---|---|---|
| | MF | (Poland) POL | Dariusz Adamczuk | 41 | 1 | 33 | 1 | 4+1 | 0 | 2 | 0 | 1 | 0 |
| | MF | (Scotland) SCO | Iain Anderson | 44 | 6 | 32+4 | 6 | 4+1 | 0 | 1+1 | 0 | 1 | 0 |
| | FW | (Scotland) SCO | Eddie Annand | 42 | 14 | 27+7 | 12 | 2+3 | 2 | 2 | 0 | 0+1 | 0 |
| | FW | (Scotland) SCO | Graham Bayne | 2 | 0 | 0+2 | 0 | 0 | 0 | 0 | 0 | 0 | 0 |
| | GK | (Scotland) SCO | Rab Douglas | 44 | 0 | 36 | 0 | 5 | 0 | 2 | 0 | 1 | 0 |
| | MF | (Scotland) SCO | John Elliot | 21 | 2 | 1+16 | 2 | 0+1 | 0 | 0+2 | 0 | 0+1 | 0 |
| | MF | (Scotland) SCO | Ray Farningham | 3 | 0 | 0+1 | 0 | 0 | 0 | 0+1 | 0 | 0+1 | 0 |
| | DF | (Scotland) SCO | Derek Fleming | 20 | 0 | 15+2 | 0 | 1+2 | 0 | 0 | 0 | 0 | 0 |
| | FW | (Scotland) SCO | James Grady | 44 | 18 | 36 | 15 | 5 | 3 | 2 | 0 | 1 | 0 |
| | MF | (Scotland) SCO | Brian Grant | 8 | 0 | 5+3 | 0 | 0 | 0 | 0 | 0 | 0 | 0 |
| | DF | (Scotland) SCO | Brian Irvine | 44 | 1 | 36 | 1 | 5 | 0 | 2 | 0 | 1 | 0 |
| | MF | (Northern Ireland) NIR | Russell Kelly | 20 | 2 | 16+3 | 2 | 1 | 0 | 0 | 0 | 0 | 0 |
| | DF | (England) ENG | Lee Maddison | 29 | 2 | 19+5 | 1 | 3 | 1 | 2 | 0 | 0 | 0 |
| | MF | (Scotland) SCO | Darren Magee | 22 | 0 | 11+6 | 0 | 2 | 0 | 2 | 0 | 1 | 0 |
| | FW | (Scotland) SCO | Steve McCormick | 19 | 6 | 6+8 | 5 | 3+2 | 1 | 0 | 0 | 0 | 0 |
| | MF | (Scotland) SCO | John McGlashan | 11 | 2 | 5+3 | 1 | 2 | 1 | 0+1 | 0 | 0 | 0 |
| | MF | (Scotland) SCO | Jim McInally | 40 | 1 | 32 | 1 | 5 | 0 | 2 | 0 | 1 | 0 |
| | DF | (Scotland) SCO | Steven Milne | 2 | 0 | 1+1 | 0 | 0 | 0 | 0 | 0 | 0 | 0 |
| | FW | (Scotland) SCO | Jerry O'Driscoll | 16 | 2 | 1+12 | 1 | 0 | 0 | 1+1 | 1 | 1 | 0 |
| | MF | (Scotland) SCO | Gavin Rae | 6 | 0 | 1+5 | 0 | 0 | 0 | 0 | 0 | 0 | 0 |
| | DF | (Scotland) SCO | Robbie Raeside | 14 | 1 | 9+2 | 0 | 3 | 1 | 0 | 0 | 0 | 0 |
| | FW | (Scotland) SCO | John Robertson | 4 | 1 | 4 | 1 | 0 | 0 | 0 | 0 | 0 | 0 |
| | DF | (England) ENG | Dave Rogers | 40 | 1 | 31+1 | 1 | 4+1 | 0 | 2 | 0 | 1 | 0 |
| | DF | (Scotland) SCO | Barry Smith | 42 | 1 | 34 | 1 | 5 | 0 | 2 | 0 | 1 | 0 |
| | DF | (Scotland) SCO | Craig Tully | 19 | 0 | 5+10 | 0 | 1+2 | 0 | 0 | 0 | 1 | 0 |

== See also ==
- List of Dundee F.C. seasons
