= 1998–99 Dundee F.C. season =

Dundee
1998–99 season
- Manager: Jocky Scott
- Stadium: Dens Park
- Scottish Premier League: 5th
- Scottish Cup: Third round
- Scottish League Cup: Second round
- Top goalscorer: League: Eddie Annand (9); All: Eddie Annand (10)
- Highest home attendance: 12,081 vs. Dundee United, 19 September 1998 (SPL)
- Average home league attendance: 7,176
Home colours

The 1998–99 season was the 97th season in which Dundee competed at a Scottish national level, playing in the top tier of Scottish football, the Scottish Premier League, for the first time since the 1993–94 season after winning the First Division the previous season. Dundee would finish the league season in 5th place with 46 points, their highest finish in Scottish football since 1973–74. Dundee would also compete in the Scottish League Cup and the Scottish Cup, where they were knocked out by Alloa Athletic in the 2nd round of the League Cup, and by Greenock Morton in the 3rd round of the Scottish Cup.

== Scottish Premier League ==
=== Legend ===
Win	Draw	Loss

Dundee's score comes first. Statistics provided by Dee Archive

Match	Date	Opponent	Venue	Result	Attendance	Scorers
1	1 August 1998	Aberdeen	H	0–2	7,811	
2	15 August 1998	Dunfermline Athletic	A	0–2	5,308	
3	23 August 1998	St Johnstone	H	0–1	3,641	
4	29 August 1998	Celtic	H	1–1	9,853	Annand 90'
5	12 September 1998	Heart of Midlothian	A	2–0	13,117	Adamczuk 48', 82'
6	19 September 1998	Dundee United	H	2–2	12,081	Annand 69', Adamczuk 89'
7	23 September 1998	Kilmarnock	A	1–2	7,096	Annand 10'
8	26 September 1998	Motherwell	H	1–0	5,655	Irvine 8'
9	4 October 1998	Rangers	A	0–1	4,834	Irvine 8'
10	17 October 1998	Aberdeen	A	2–2	10,004	Annand 60', 70'
11	28 October 1998	Dunfermline Athletic	H	1–0	4,619	Falconer 61'
12	31 October 1998	Heart of Midlothian	H	1–0	6,142	Weir 77' (o.g.)
13	7 November 1998	Celtic	A	1–6	58,093	Annand 21'
14	14 November 1998	Kilmarnock	H	1–1	4,249	Annand 29'
15	22 November 1998	Dundee United	A	1–0	11,230	Grady 82'
16	12 December 1998	St Johnstone	A	1–1	6,033	Adamczuk 74'
17	16 December 1998	Motherwell	A	1–2	5,890	Adamczuk 37'
18	19 December 1998	Aberdeen	H	1–2	6,340	Rae 18'
19	27 December 1998	Celtic	H	0–3	10,004	
20	30 December 1998	Heart of Midlothian	A	2–1	13,383	Sharp 18, Falconer 42'
21	2 January 1999	Dundee United	H	1–3	11,751	McSkimming 28'
22	27 January 1999	Rangers	H	0–4	9,453	
23	30 January 1999	Kilmarnock	A	0–0	7,677	
24	6 February 1999	Motherwell	H	1–0	4,187	Tweed 3'
25	20 February 1999	Rangers	A	1–6	49,462	Adamczuk 28'
26	27 February 1999	St Johnstone	H	0–1	7,245	
27	13 March 1999	Dunfermline Athletic	A	0–2	6,890	
28	20 March 1999	Heart of Midlothian	H	2–0	6,612	Annand 54', 65'
29	3 April 1999	Celtic	A	0–5	59,269	
30	10 April 1999	Motherwell	A	2–1	5,717	Falconer 65', Grady 73'
31	18 April 1999	Rangers	H	1–1	11,051	Anderson 23'
32	24 April 1999	Kilmarnock	H	2–1	4,296	Anderson 44', McSkimming 64'
33	1 May 1999	Dundee United	A	2–0	12,280	Irvine 67', Grady 90'
34	8 May 1999	Aberdeen	A	2–1	7,970	Boyack 41', Anderson 86'
35	15 May 1999	Dunfermline Athletic	H	3–1	4,179	Irvine 22', Boyack 50', Falconer 61'
36	23 May 1999	St Johnstone	A	0–1	10,575	

=== Final league table ===
Pos	Team	Pld	W	D	L	GF	GA	GD	Pts	Qualification or relegation
3	St Johnstone	36	15	12	9	39	38	+1	57	Qualification for the UEFA Cup qualifying round (Note: Since Rangers, the winners of the 1998–99 Scottish Cup, already qualified for the UEFA Champions League, Celtic, the losing finalist, earned a spot in the 1999–2000 UEFA Cup. As such, the league's UEFA Cup place moved down to third-placed St Johnstone. Scotland were also awarded an additional UEFA Cup place as the association was top of the UEFA Fair Play ranking. Kilmarnock earned this place as winners of the Scottish Fair Play ranking.)
4	Kilmarnock	36	14	14	8	47	29	+18	56	Qualification for the UEFA Cup qualifying round
5	Dundee	36	13	7	16	36	56	−20	46	
6	Heart of Midlothian	36	11	9	16	44	50	−6	42	
7	Motherwell	36	10	11	15	35	54	−19	41	

Updated to match(es) played on end of season. Source: Soccerway and SPL official website
Rules for classification: 1) Points; 2) Goal difference; 3) Goals scored

== Scottish Cup ==
Statistics provided by Dee Archive

Match	Date	Opponent	Venue	Result	Attendance	Scorers
R3	23 January 1999	Greenock Morton	A	1–2	5,550	Annand 41'

== Scottish League Cup ==
Statistics provided by Dee Archive

Match	Date	Opponent	Venue	Result	Attendance	Scorers
R2	8 August 1998	Alloa Athletic	H	0–1	2,057	

== Player statistics ==
Statistics provided by Dee Archive

No.	Pos	Nat	Player	Total		First Division		Scottish Cup		League Cup	
No.	Pos	Nat	Player	Apps	Goals	Apps	Goals	Apps	Goals	Apps	Goals
	MF	(Poland) POL	Dariusz Adamczuk	28	6	24+2	6	1	0	1	0
	MF	(Scotland) SCO	Iain Anderson	29	3	17+11	3	0+1	0	0	0
	FW	(Scotland) SCO	Eddie Annand	31	10	19+10	9	1	1	1	0
	FW	(Scotland) SCO	Graham Bayne	2	0	0+2	0	0	0	0	0
	MF	(Scotland) SCO	Steven Boyack	8	2	8	2	0	0	0	0
	FW	(Republic of Ireland) IRL	Tommy Coyne	16	0	7+8	0	0	0	1	0
	GK	(Scotland) SCO	Rab Douglas	37	0	35	0	1	0	1	0
	MF	(Scotland) SCO	Willie Falconer	35	4	31+2	4	1	0	1	0
	DF	(Scotland) SCO	Derek Fleming	1	0	1	0	0	0	0	0
	DF	(France) FRA	Éric Garcin	4	0	2+1	0	0	0	1	0
	FW	(Scotland) SCO	James Grady	28	3	20+6	3	0+1	0	0+1	0
	MF	(Scotland) SCO	Brian Grant	5	0	0+4	0	1	0	0	0
	DF	(Scotland) SCO	Gordon Hunter	3	0	3	0	0	0	0	0
	DF	(Scotland) SCO	Brian Irvine	34	3	33	3	0	0	1	0
	GK	(Scotland) SCO	Jamie Langfield	2	0	1+1	0	0	0	0	0
	DF	(England) ENG	Lee Maddison	22	0	21	0	1	0	0	0
	MF	(Scotland) SCO	Darren Magee	2	0	1+1	0	0	0	0	0
	FW	(Scotland) SCO	Steve McCormick	2	0	0+1	0	0	0	0+1	0
	MF	(Scotland) SCO	Jim McInally	15	0	14+1	0	0	0	0	0
	MF	(Scotland) SCO	Shaun McSkimming	30	2	25+4	2	0	0	1	0
	DF	(Scotland) SCO	Willie Miller	29	0	27	0	1	0	1	0
	FW	(Scotland) SCO	Jerry O'Driscoll	1	0	0+1	0	0	0	0	0
	MF	(Scotland) SCO	Stéphane Pounewatchy	4	0	2+1	0	0	0	1	0
	MF	(Scotland) SCO	Gavin Rae	30	1	23+7	1	0	0	0	0
	DF	(Scotland) SCO	Robbie Raeside	22	0	19+2	0	1	0	0	0
	MF	(Scotland) SCO	Hugh Robertson	11	0	9+1	0	1	0	0	0
	DF	(England) ENG	Dave Rogers	11	0	7+4	0	0	0	0	0
	DF	(Scotland) SCO	Lee Sharp	6	1	4+2	1	0	0	0	0
	DF	(Scotland) SCO	Barry Smith	35	0	29+4	0	1	0	1	0
	MF	(Scotland) SCO	Gavin Strachan	6	0	4+2	0	0	0	0	0
	DF	(Scotland) SCO	Steven Tweed	11	1	10	1	1	0	0	0

== See also ==
- List of Dundee F.C. seasons
