= 1999–2000 Dundee F.C. season =

Dundee
1999–2000 season
- Manager: Jocky Scott
- Stadium: Dens Park
- Scottish Premier League: 7th
- Scottish Cup: Third Round
- Scottish League Cup: Quarter Final
Home colours

The 1999–2000 season saw Dundee compete in the Scottish Premier League where they finished in 7th position with 41 points.

== Final league table ==
Pos	Team	Pld	W	D	L	GF	GA	GD	Pts
5	St Johnstone	36	10	12	14	36	44	−8	42
6	Hibernian	36	10	11	15	49	61	−12	41
7	Dundee	36	12	5	19	45	64	−19	41
8	Dundee United	36	11	6	19	34	57	−23	39
9	Kilmarnock	36	8	13	15	38	52	−14	37

Updated to match(es) played on end of season. Source: Scottish Professional Football League
Rules for classification: 1) Points; 2) Goal difference; 3) Goals scored

== Results ==
Dundee's score comes first

=== Legend ===
Win	Draw	Loss

=== Scottish Premier League ===
Match	Date	Opponent	Venue	Result	Attendance	Scorers
1	31 July 1999	Dundee United	A	1–2	11,693	Falconer 52'
2	8 August 1999	Hibernian	H	3–4	6,050	Lovering 56' (o.g.), McSkimming 57', Annand 73'
3	14 August 1999	Aberdeen	A	2–0	8,174	Falconer 29', 39'
4	21 August 1999	Celtic	H	1–2	10,531	Sharp 86'
5	28 August 1999	Motherwell	A	2–0	6,278	Annand 16', Falconer 83'
6	11 September 1999	Heart of Midlothian	A	0–4	13,378	
7	19 September 1999	St Johnstone	H	1–2	5,283	Yates 10'
8	25 September 1999	Kilmarnock	A	2–0	7,433	Boyack 41', Rae 83'
9	2 October 1999	Rangers	H	2–3	10,494	McSkimming 56', Falconer 69'
10	17 October 1999	Dundee United	H	0–2	9,484	
11	23 October 1999	Hibernian	A	2–5	10,160	Matute 6', Falconer 73'
12	30 October 1999	Heart of Midlothian	H	1–0	6,018	Tweed 2'
13	6 November 1999	St Johnstone	A	0–1	4,917	
14	20 November 1999	Motherwell	H	0–1	4,340	
15	28 November 1999	Rangers	A	2–1	47,414	Ireland 14', Rae 90'
16	12 December 1999	Dundee United	A	0–1	9,185	
17	27 December 1999	St Johnstone	H	1–1	6,232	Falconer 77'
18	22 January 2000	Heart of Midlothian	A	0–2	13,112	
19	26 January 2000	Kilmarnock	H	0–0	4,039	
20	5 February 2000	Motherwell	A	3–0	5,865	Robertson 49', Rae 66', Grady 90'
21	12 February 2000	Celtic	H	0–3	10,044	
22	23 February 2000	Aberdeen	H	1–3	5,784	Bayne 87'
23	27 February 2000	Rangers	H	1–7	9,297	Tweed 28'
24	1 March 2000	Celtic	A	2–6	56,228	Robertson 58', Grady 77'
25	4 March 2000	Kilmarnock	A	2–2	8,460	Annand 75', Grady 82'
26	21 March 2000	Hibernian	A	2–1	10,208	Falconer 62', 90'
27	25 March 2000	St Johnstone	A	1–2	4,655	Falconer 47'
28	1 April 2000	Heart of Midlothian	H	0–0	6,291	
29	8 April 2000	Motherwell	H	4–1	4,701	Grady 52', 54', Billio 81', Luna 85'
30	15 April 2000	Celtic	A	2–2	47,163	Luna 1', Gould 54' (o.g.)
31	18 April 2000	Aberdeen	A	1–0	12,403	Artero 90'
32	22 April 2000	Kilmarnock	H	1–2	6,208	Luna 76'
33	30 April 2000	Rangers	A	0–3	50,032	
34	6 May 2000	Dundee United	H	3–0	8,581	Falconer 49', 74', Grady 64'
35	14 May 2000	Hibernian	H	1–0	5,061	Rae 54'
36	21 May 2000	Aberdeen	H	0–2	6,449	

=== Scottish Cup ===
Match	Date	Opponent	Venue	Result	Attendance	Scorers
R3	29 January 2000	Ayr United	H	0–0	3,925	
R3 Replay	15 February 2000	Ayr United	A	1–1 (6–7 pens)	3,029	Rae 91'

=== Scottish League Cup ===
Match	Date	Opponent	Venue	Result	Attendance	Scorers
R2	17 August 1999	Dumbarton	H	4–0	2,782	Boyack 17', 90', Falconer 31', 35'
R3	12 October 1999	Alloa Athletic	A	3–1	1,344	Falconer 20', 52', Grady 40'
QF	1 December 1999	Celtic	A	0–1	40,260	
