= Augustinians =

Members of religious orders that follow the Rule of Saint Augustine

Augustinians are members of several religious orders that follow the Rule of Saint Augustine, written about A.D. 400 by Augustine of Hippo. There are two distinct types of Augustinians in Catholic religious orders dating back to the 12th–13th centuries:

- Various congregations of Canons Regular follow the Rule of Saint Augustine, embracing the evangelical counsels and leading a semi-monastic life, while remaining committed to pastoral care appropriate to their primary vocation as priests. They generally form one large community which might serve parishes in the vicinity, and are organized into autonomous congregations.
- Several orders of friars who live a mixed religious life of contemplation and apostolic ministry. The largest and most familiar is the Order of Saint Augustine (O.S.A.), founded in 1244 and originally known as the Hermits of Saint Augustine (O.E.S.A.). They are commonly known as the Austin Friars in England. Two other orders, the Order of Augustinian Recollects (O.A.R.) and the Discalced Augustinians (O.A.D.), were once part of the original Order under a single Prior General. The Recollects, begun in 1588 as a reform movement in Spain to recover the Order's eremitical roots, became autonomous in 1612. At the 100th General Chapter of the Order held in Rome in May 1592, those seeking reform of their way of life came to be called the Discalced (barefoot) and were authorized to seek their goals as a semi-independent branch. They were raised to the status of a separate mendicant Order in 1610.

There are also some Anglican religious orders created in the 19th century that follow Augustine's rule. These are composed only of women in several different communities of Augustinian nuns.

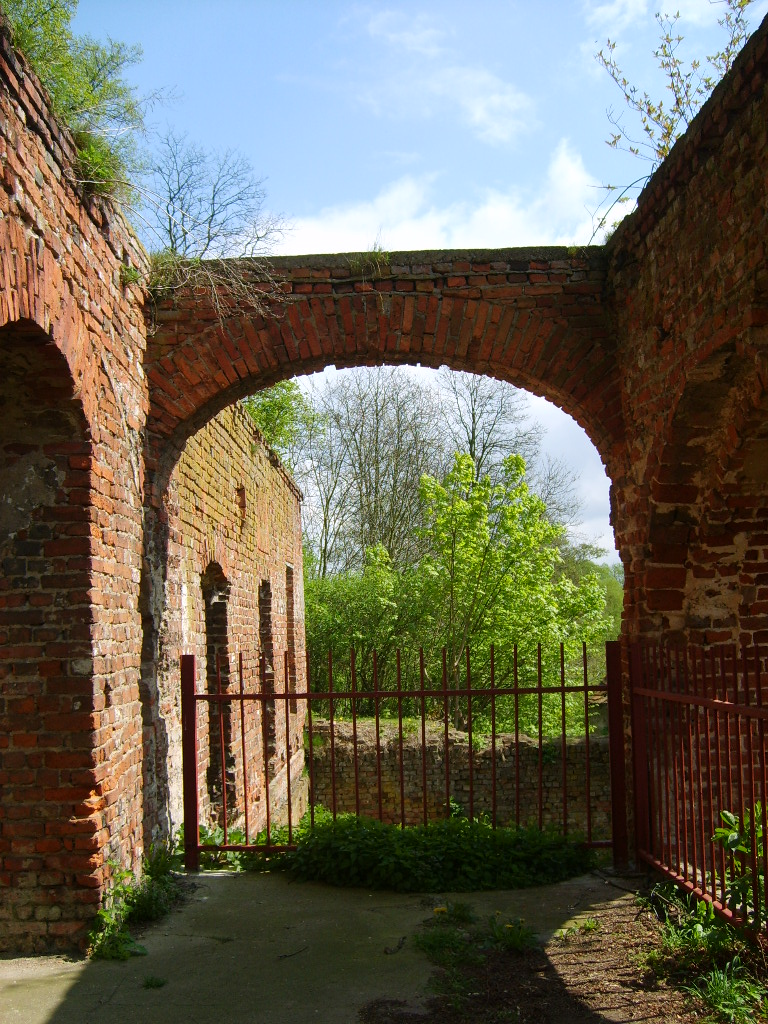
Ruins of Jasienice Abbey, a former Augustinian priory in Jasienica, Police, Poland (14th century).

== Charism ==
In a religious community, "charism" is the particular contribution that each religious order, congregation or family and its individual members embody. The teaching and writing of Augustine, the Augustinian Rule, and the lives and experiences of Augustinians over sixteen centuries help define the ethos and special charism of the order.

The pursuit of truth through learning is key to the Augustinian ethos, balanced by the injunction to behave with love towards one another. These same imperatives of affection and fairness have driven the order in its international missionary outreach. This balanced pursuit of love and learning has energised the various branches of the order into building communities founded on mutual affection and intellectual advancement.

Augustine spoke passionately of God's "beauty so ancient and so new", and his fascination with beauty extended to music. He taught that "whoever sings prays twice" (Qui cantat, bis orat) and music is also a key part of the Augustinian ethos. Contemporary Augustinian musical foundations include the Augustinerkirche in Vienna, where orchestral masses by Mozart and Schubert are performed every week, as well as the boys' choir at Sankt Florian in Austria, a school conducted by Augustinian canons, a choir now over 1,000 years old.

Augustinians have also produced a formidable body of scholarly works.

== Background ==
Augustinian friars believe that Augustine of Hippo, first with some friends and afterward as bishop with his clergy, led a monastic community life. Regarding the use of property or possessions, Augustine did not make a virtue of poverty, but of sharing. Their manner of life led others to imitate them. Instructions for their guidance were found in several writings of Augustine, especially in De opere monachorum, mentioned in ancient codices of the eighth or ninth century as the "Rule of St. Augustine". Between 430 and 570 this life-style was carried to Europe by monks and clergy fleeing the persecution of the Vandals. In the thirteenth century, the various eremitical groups that composed the Augustinian Hermits faced the threat of suppression by the papacy based on their lack of antiquity. To overcome this, the friars forged a historical connection to St Augustine and made an especial point to demonstrate that they received the Rule directly from Augustine himself. The Augustinian rule was in use by a wide range of groups across early and high medieval Europe, and there is no historical evidence that the Augustinian Friars were in any way founded by St Augustine himself. Rather, the friars invented these links after the Order was threatened with suppression in 1274 at the Second Council of Lyons.

While in early medieval times the rule was overshadowed by other Rules, particularly that of St. Benedict, this system of life for cathedral clergy continued in various locations throughout Europe for centuries, and they became known as Canons regular (i.e. cathedral clergy living in community according to a rule). Augustine's Rule appears again in practice in the eleventh century as a basis for the reform of monasteries and cathedral chapters.

Several groups of canons were established under various disciplines, all with the Augustinian Rule as their basis. It was adopted by the Canons Regular of the Abbey of St. Victor in Paris, as well as the Norbertines. The instructions contained in Augustine's Rule formed the basis of the Rule that, in accordance with the decree of the Lateran Synod of 1059, was adopted by canons who desired to practice a common apostolic life, hence the title of Canons Regular of Saint Augustine.

== Orders, groups, and societies ==
=== Canons Regular ===
The Canons Regular follow the more ancient form of religious life, which developed toward the end of the first millennium and thus predates the founding of the friars. They represent a clerical adaptation of monastic life, as it grew out of an attempt to organize communities of clerics to a more dedicated way of life, as St. Augustine himself had done. Historically, it paralleled the lay movement of monasticism or the eremitical life from which the friars were later to develop. In their tradition, the canons added the commitment of religious vows to their primary vocation of pastoral care. As the canons became independent of the diocesan structures, they came to form their own monastic communities. Orders of Augustine canons regular include the Canons Regular of Premontre, the Canons Regular of the Lateran, the Canons Regular of the Holy Cross, and Canons Regular of St. Augustine (CRSA).

=== Augustinian Friars ===
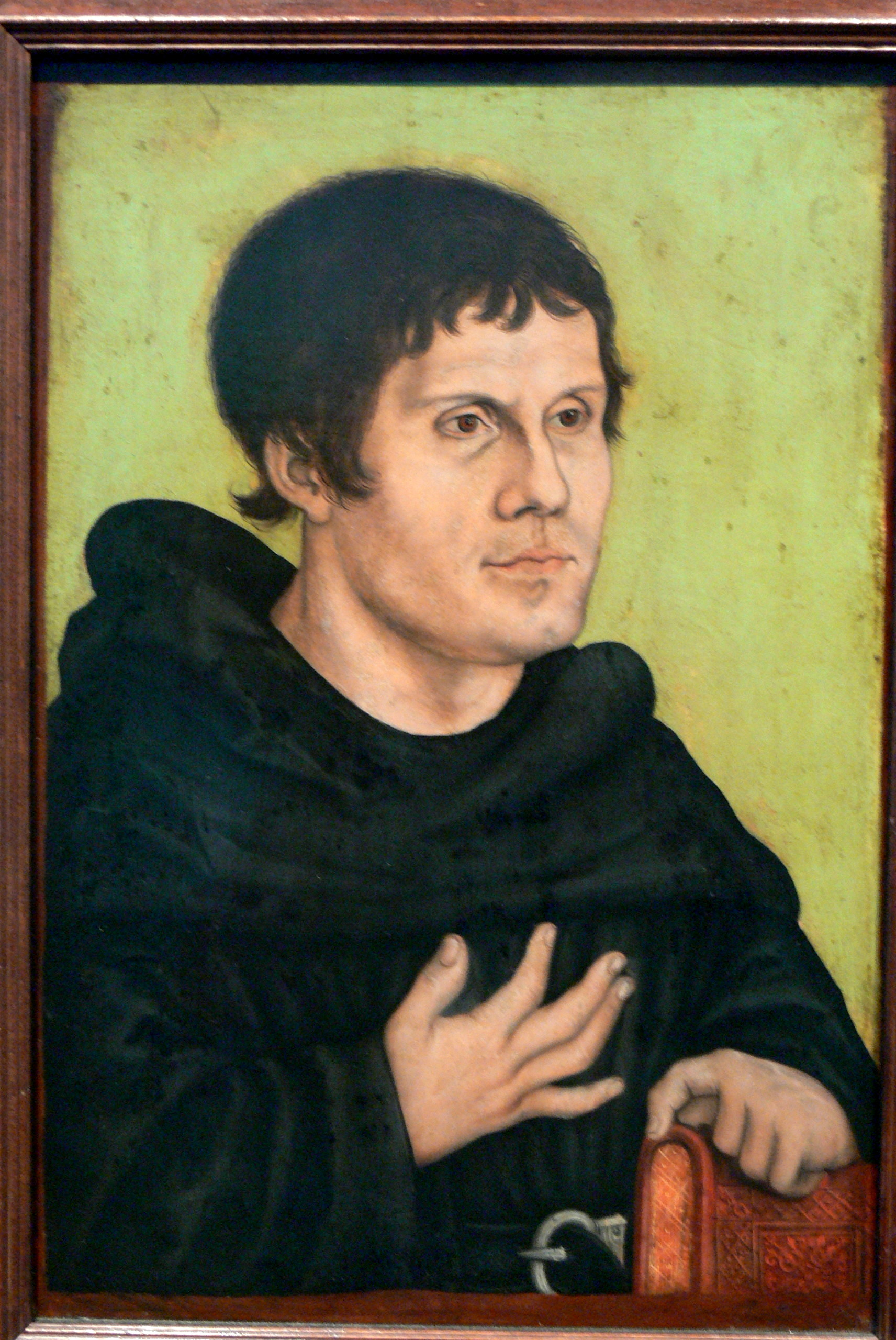
Martin Luther (1483–1546), in the habit of the Augustinian Order. Luther was an Augustinian friar from 1505 until his excommunication in 1520. Luther would later renounce his religious vows and marry Katharina von Bora in 1525.

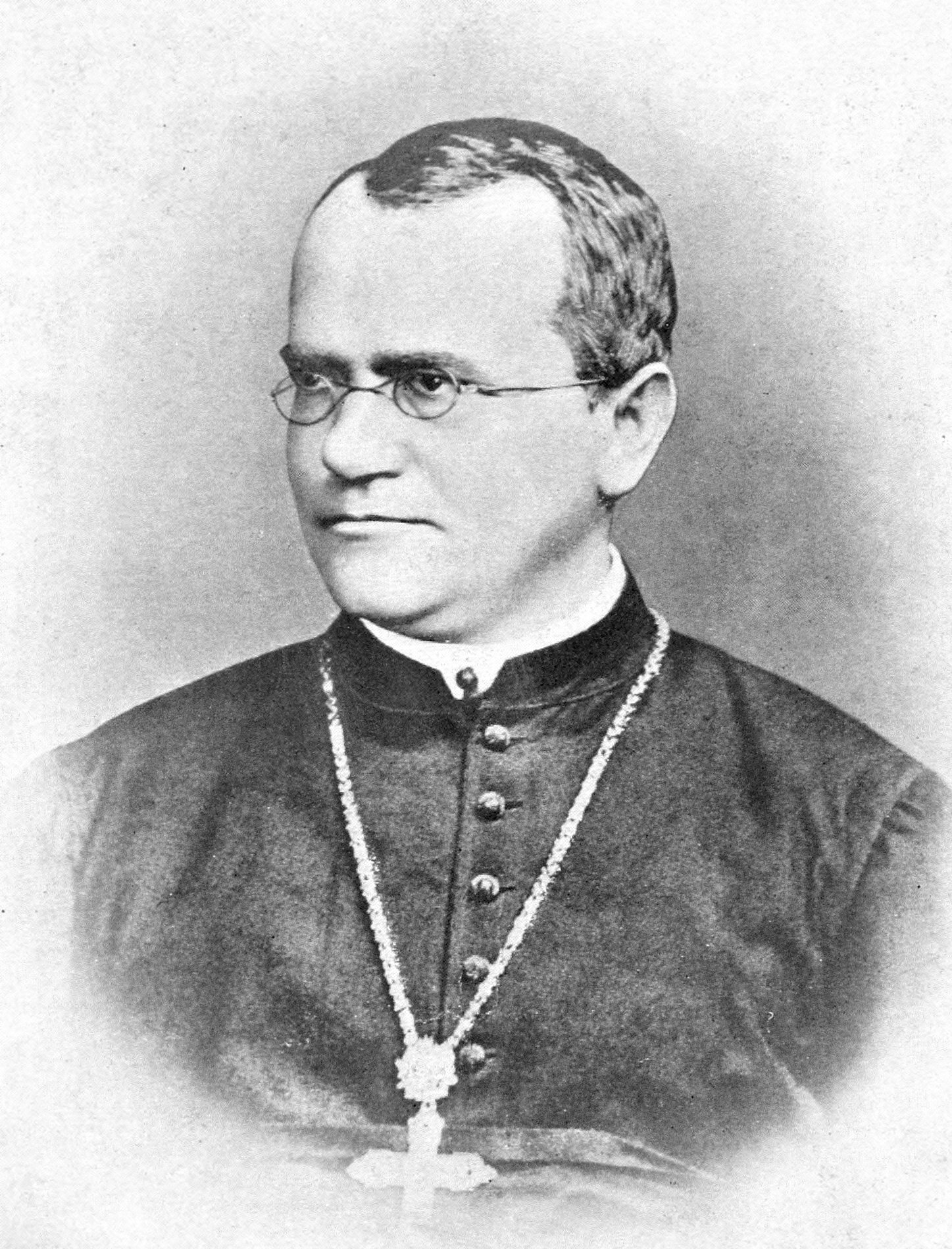
Abbot Gregor Mendel (1822–1884)

The 2008 Constitutions of the Order of St. Augustine states that the Order of Saint Augustine is composed of the following:

a) friars, whether professed or novices, who are members of the various Circumscriptions of the Order (meaning a Province, Vicariate, or Delegation).
b) the contemplative nuns belonging to the monasteries of the order.
c) the members of the Augustinian Secular Fraternities, legitimately established by the Prior General.

In addition to these three branches, the Augustinian family also includes other groups: a) religious institutes, both male and female, formally aggregated to the order by a decree of the Prior General (this would include the Augustinians of the Assumption, the Sisters of St. Rita, etc.); b) other groups of lay Augustinians; c) lay faithful affiliated to the Order.

The Augustinian, or Austin, friars (OSA), are a mendicant order. As consecrated religious, they pray the Liturgy of the Hours throughout the day. This Latin Church order, while a contemplative Order, differs from traditional monastic orders in three ways. 1) They do not take vows of stability, meaning that they can live in one house (called a friary or sometimes a monastery) typically for several years before being moved into a different community of the order. 2) They are engaged in apostolic activity, such as mission work, education, prison ministries, etc. The order is under the supervision of a Prior General in Rome, and as an international order, they are divided into various Provinces throughout the world, with each Province being led by a Prior Provincial. (3) As an order, they have a special commitment to corporate poverty as opposed to simply the poverty professed by the individual friar. While this is not currently legislated as it was in the origins of the order, this is to be a distinguishing mark of their lives as a community.

As consecrated religious, Augustinians profess the evangelical counsels of chastity, poverty, and obedience. They follow the Rule of St. Augustine, written sometime between 397 and 403 for a monastic community Augustine founded in Hippo (in modern day Algeria), and which takes as its inspiration the early Christian community described in the Acts of the Apostles, particularly Acts 4:32: "The community of believers was of one heart and mind, and no one claimed that any of his possessions was his own, but they had everything in common." (NAB).

By decree of the Holy See, the Augustinian Order was historically granted what was known as exempt status, which made it directly dependent on the Pope, meaning that bishops had no jurisdiction with regard to the internal affairs of the order. This is now expressed by saying that the order is an institute of pontifical right.

==== History of the Friars ====
The Augustinian friars originated after the older Canons Regular. The friars represented part of the mendicant movement of the 13th century, a new form of religious life which sought to bring the religious ideals of monastic life into an urban setting, which allowed the religious to serve the needs of the people in an apostolic capacity. At this time, a number of eremitical groups lived in such diverse places as Tuscany, Latium, Umbria, Liguria, England, Switzerland, Germany, and France. The Fourth Council of the Lateran of 1215 issued the decree Ne nimium to organise these small groups of religious people by requiring them to live in community, to hold elective chapters, to be under obedience to a major superior, and to adopt one of the Rules of community life that were approved by the Church.

===== Little Union =====
In 1243, the Tuscan hermits petitioned Pope Innocent IV to unite them all as one group. On 16 December 1243, Innocent IV issued the bull Incumbit Nobis, an essentially pastoral letter which, despite its brevity, basically served as the magna carta initiating the foundation of the Order as it is known today. This papal bull exhorted these hermits to adopt the Rule and way of life of Augustine of Hippo, to profess this Augustinian manner of life in a way that they themselves would decide with regard to their specific charism and apostolate, and to elect a Prior General. The bull also appointed Cardinal Riccardo Annibaldi as their Cardinal protector. The importance of this man in the foundation of the Order cannot be overstated.

As decreed by the bull Praesentium Vobis, the Tuscan hermits came together for a general chapter in March 1244, a chapter presided over by Cardinal Annibaldi. In this chapter, the Order formally adopted the Rule of St. Augustine and determined to follow the Roman office with the Cistercian psalter, and to hold triennial elections of the Prior General. The first Prior General was Friar Matthew, followed by Adjutus and Philip. In the papal bull Pia desideria, issued on 31 March 1244, Pope Innocent IV formally approved the foundation of the Order.

===== Grand Union of 1256 =====
In 1255, Innocent's successor, Pope Alexander IV, issued the papal bull Cum Quaedam Salubria summoning all the various groups of Augustinian hermits and the Hermits of Saint William to send two representatives to Rome for a General Chapter, again to be held under the supervision of his nephew, Cardinal Annibaldi. During this chapter, the following groups of hermits, inter alia, were amalgamated to the Order, which up to then had only consisted of the groups of the Tuscan hermits (including the Hermits of the Holy Trinity):

- the Hermits of Saint William
- the Brittin (named after St. Blasius de Brittinis)
- the Bonites (named after St. John the Good), the Fratres Saccati in Italy, and some of the houses of the Poor Catholics united with the Bonites. By 1256, the Bonites possessed eleven monasteries.

At this Chapter Lanfranc Settala, the leader of the Bonites, was elected Prior General. The belted, black tunic of the Tuscan hermits was adopted as the common religious habit, and the walking sticks carried by the Bonites in keeping with eremitical tradition—and to distinguish themselves from those hermits who went around begging—ceased to be used. The 12-year-old religious Order of friars now consisted of 100 or more houses.

On 9 April 1256 Pope Alexander IV issued the bull Licet Ecclesiae catholicae (Bullarium Taurinense, 3rd ed., 635 sq.) which confirmed the integration of the Hermits of John the Good (Rule of St. Augustine, 1225), the Hermits of St. William (Rule of St. Benedict), the Hermits of Brettino (Rule of St. Augustine, 1228), the Hermits of Monte Favale (Rule of St. Benedict), other smaller congregations, and the Tuscan Hermits into what was officially called the Order of Hermits of Saint Augustine. Almost from the beginning the term "hermits" became a misnomer for they ranked among the friars, and became the fourth of the mendicant orders. The observance and manner of life was mild relative to those times, meat being allowed four days in the week.

In August 1256, a number of Williamite houses withdrew from the newly formed mendicant order and were allowed to continue as a separate congregation under the Benedictine rule.

The early years in the Order's history featured a great devotion to learning, to study, to prayer, to service of the poor, and to defense of the Pope and the Church – a particular charism of the Order rooted in the fact that it is the only Order in the history of the Church to be founded directly by a Pope. In his work The Life of the Brothers, the 14th-century Augustinian historian and friar Jordan of Saxony writes: "It is certain that in its modern state the Order is principally founded on spiritual works, those that pertain to the contemplative life. These are as follows: the singing of the divine office; the service of the altar; prayer; psalm singing; devotion to reading or study of sacred scripture; teaching and preaching the word of God; hearing confessions of the faithful; bringing about the salvation of souls by word and example.".

The Order expanded beyond Europe to the eastern Mediterranean, briefly acquiring a convent in Acre just prior to its conquest in 1291. In the middle of the fourteenth century, the Augustinian Friars acquired the large convent of San Salvatore in Venetian Heraklion (medieval Candia), where they attempted to use the cult of Nicholas of Tolentino to appeal to the local Greek-speaking population. The building stood on Kornaros Square until its demolition in 1970.

The Augustinians count among their number over a dozen saints and numerous members declared blessed by the Church. Bishop Robert Prevost was the latest member of the order to be elevated to the cardinalate until his election as Pope Leo XIV in 2025.

==== Privileges of the order ====
Ecclesiastical privileges were granted to the order almost from its beginning. Alexander IV freed the order from the jurisdiction of the bishops; Innocent VIII, in 1490, granted to the churches of the order indulgences such as can only be gained by making the Stations at Rome; Pope Pius V placed the Augustinians among the mendicant orders and ranked them next to the Carmelites. Since the end of the 13th century, the sacristan of the Papal Palace was always to be an Augustinian friar, who would be ordained as a bishop. This privilege was ratified by Pope Alexander VI and granted to the Order forever by a Bull issued in 1497. The holder of the office was Rector of the Vatican parish (of which the chapel of St. Paul is the parish church). To his office also belonged the duty of preserving in his oratory a consecrated Host, which had to be renewed weekly and kept in readiness in case of the pope's illness, when it was the privilege of the papal sacristan to administer the last sacraments to the pope. The sacristan had always to accompany the pope when he traveled, and during a conclave it was he who celebrated Mass and administered the sacraments. He lived at the Vatican with a sub-sacristan and three lay brothers of the order (cf. Rocca, "Chronhistoria de Apostolico Sacrario", Rome, 1605). Augustinian friars, as of 2009, still perform the duties of papal sacristans, but the appointment of an Augustinian bishop-sacristan lapsed under Pope John Paul II with the retirement of Petrus Canisius Van Lierde in 1991. In papal Rome the Augustinian friars always filled one of the Chairs of the Sapienza University, and one of the consultorships in the Congregation of Rites.

==== Discalced and Recollect friars ====
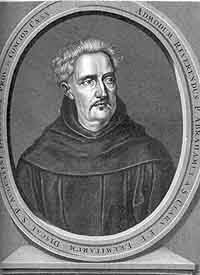
Abraham a Sancta Clara (1644–1709)

The Discalced Augustinians were formed in 1588 in Italy as a reform movement of the Order and have their own constitutions, differing from those of the other Augustinians. The Augustinian Recollects developed in Spain in 1592 with the same goal. Currently, though, they are primarily found serving in pastoral care.

==== Organization of the order ====
The Augustinian Hermits, while following the rule known as that of St. Augustine, are also subject to the Constitutions, first drawn up by Augustinus Novellus (d. 1309), Prior General of the order from 1298 to 1300, and by Clement of Osimo. A revision was made at Rome in 1895. The Constitutions were revised again and published at Rome in 1895, with additions in 1901 and 1907. Today, the Order follows the Constitutions approved in the Ordinary General Chapter of 2007.

The government of the order is as follows: At the head is the Prior General, elected every six years by the General Chapter. The Prior General is aided by six assistants and a secretary, also elected by the General Chapter. These form the Curia Generalitia. Each province is governed by a Prior Provincial, each commissariat by a Commissary General, each of the two congregations by a Vicar General, and every monastery by a Prior (only the Czech monastery of Alt-Brunn in Moravia is under an abbot) and every college by a Rector. The members of the Order number both priests and lay brothers. The Augustinians, like most religious orders, have a Cardinal Protector.

The Augustinians follow the rule of St. Augustine, which is divided into 8 chapters (purpose and basis of common life, prayer, moderation and self-denial, safeguarding chastity and fraternal correction, the care of community goods and treatment of sick, asking for pardon and forgiving others, governance and obedience, and observance of the rule). The Augustinians also use the charism or "gift from the Holy Spirit" to guide the communal life.

The choir and outdoor dress of the friars is a tunic of black woolen material, with long, wide sleeves, a black leather girdle, and a large shoulder cape to which is attached a long, pointed hood reaching to the girdle. The indoor dress consists of a black tunic and scapular, over which the shoulder cape is worn. In many monasteries, white was formerly the color worn in areas where there were no Dominicans. In hot climates, Augustinians tend to wear white habits as they are easily distinguishable from the Dominicans (i.e. without long scapular, rosary, etc.).

==== Charism of the Order of St. Augustine ====
"The foundation of Augustinian life is life in common," with a contemplative dimension.

=== Aggregated communities ===
Other orders and groups belong within the Augustinian family either because they follow the Rule of Augustine, exist as independent societies, or have been formally aggregated through their constitutions into the worldwide Augustinian Order. These are not counted comprehensively in this article only because the Catholic Church's system of governance and accounting makes just the numbers of ordained clerics relatively accessible and verifiable. Some of these include:

- The Hieronymites, the Ursulines, the Canonesses of St. Augustine of the Mercy of Jesus, the Augustinians of the Assumption (which includes a Byzantine Rite province), the Alexian Brothers, the Brothers of the Assumption (in the Congo), the Sisters of Our Lady of Consolation and San Guillermo Parish Church (which was buried half its 12-m height on September 3, 1994, due to the lahar slopes of Mount Pinatubo, Philippines), the Congregation of Our Lady of the Missions, the Sisters of Charity of the Incarnate Word (who established the University of the Incarnate Word in Texas), the Brothers Hospitallers of Saint John of God, and the Bridgettines.

=== Augustinian lay societies ===
The lay societies are voluntary groups, generally made up of people who are either married or single and have sympathy with, and interest in, the Augustinian approach to life. These lay people do not take monastic vows, but offer support to the work of the Augustinian Order in voluntary work, gifts of money and goods, and of study and promotion of St. Augustine and Augustinian teaching.

Primary among these are the Third Orders associated with the various branches of the mendicant Orders. These are the Augustinian Lay Community and the Secular Augustinian Recollects. They make a formal and public commitment as laity to follow as well as possible the life and charism of the Order.

Other associations which support the spirit and work of the friars and Sisters include: the Brotherhood of the Virgin Mary of the Belt in Italy, the Friends of Augustine in the Philippines, and the Augustinian Friends in Australia.

== Devotional practices ==
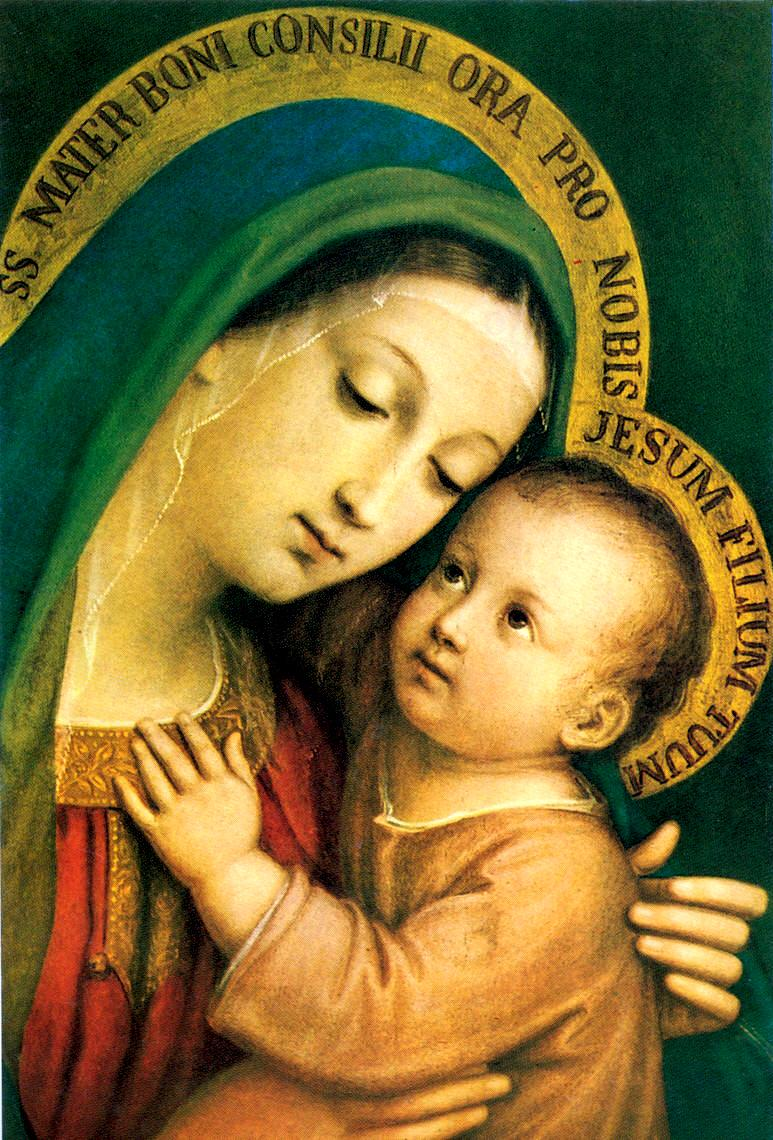
Our Lady of Good Counsel by Pasquale Sarullo

The particular devotional practices connected with the Augustinian Order, and which it has striven to propagate, include the veneration of the Blessed Virgin under the title of "Mother of Good Counsel" (Mater Boni Consilii), whose miraculous picture is to be seen in the Augustinian church at Genazzano in the Roman province. This devotion has spread to other churches and countries, and confraternities have been formed to encourage it. Several periodicals dedicated to the honour of Our Lady of Good Counsel are published in Italy, Spain and Germany by the Augustinians. The Augustinians, with the approbation of Pope Leo XIII, also encourage the devotion of the Scapular of Our Lady of Good Counsel.

Besides this devotion, the order traditionally fostered the Archconfraternity of Our Lady of Consolation. Members customarily wear a blessed sash or belt leather in honour of Saints Augustine, Monica and Nicholas of Tolentino, recite daily thirteen Our Fathers and Hail Marys and the Salve Regina, fast strictly on the eve of the feast of St. Augustine, and received Holy Communion on the feasts of the three above-named saints. This confraternity was founded by Pope Eugene IV at San Giacomo, Bologna, in 1439, made an archconfraternity by Gregory XIII, in 1575, aggregated to the Augustinian Order.

There are also a number of facilities dedicated to Mary under the title Our Lady of Grace. The Canadian Augustinians operate the Marylake Shrine of Our Lady of Grace at King City, Ontario; Our Lady of Grace Monastery is located in Nova Scotia.

== Venerate and notable individuals ==
=== Saints ===
- Fulgentius of Ruspe, Bishop (d.527)
- Clare of Montefalco, (d. 1308)
- John of Sahagún (a Sancto Facundo) (d. 1479)
- John Stone (d. 1539), a martyr of the English Reformation.
- Alonso de Orozco Mena (d. 1591)
- Bartholomew Gutierrez (d. 1632)
- Thomas ‘Kintsuba’ Jihyoe of Saint Augustine (d. 1637)
- Nicholas of Tolentino (d. 1305),
- Rita of Cascia,
- Thomas of Villanova (d. 1555).
- Peter Zúñiga (d. 1622)

=== Blesseds ===
- Clemente da Osimo (d. 1291)
- James of Viterbo, (d. 1307)
- Agostino Novello (d. 1309)
- Antonio Patrizi (d. 1311)
- Angelo da Foligno (d. 1312)
- Simon Rinalducci (d. 1322)
- Angelo da Furci (d. 1327)
- Gregorio Celli (d. 1343)
- Simon of Cascia (d. 1348)
- Gundisalvus of Lagos (d. 1422)
- William Tirry (hanged at Clonmel 1654)
- Anne Catherine Emmerich (d. 1824)
- Stefano Bellesini (d. 1840)
- Mateo Elías Nieves Castillo (d. 1928)
- Mariano de la Mata (d. 1983)

=== Venerables ===
- Alphonse Gallegos (d. 1991)

== See also ==
- Augustinian nuns
- Augustinian nuns in the Anglican Communion
- Holy Jesus Hospital
- Independent Augustinian Communities
- Pope Leo XIV
- Mercedarians, the Order of the Blessed Virgin Mary of Mercy
- Order of Aubrac
- Order of Augustinian Recollects
- Order of the Canons Regular of Premontre
- Our Lady of Good Counsel
- Society of Saint Augustine

== Bibliography ==
- Bibliography for the Augustinian official website
- Augustine of Hippo, The Rule of St Augustine Constitutiones Ordinis Fratrum S. Augustini (Rome 1968)
- The Augustinians (1244–1994): Our History in Pictures. Pubblicazioni Agostiniane, Roma, Italy.
- Canning; R. (1984). The Rule of St Augustine. Darton, Longman and Todd.
- Ebsworth, Rev. Walter (1973). Pioneer Catholic Victoria. Polding Press. ISBN 0-85884-096-0.
- Eckermann, Karl W. (1999), "Augustinians", in Fahlbusch, Erwin (ed.), Encyclopedia of Christianity, vol. 1, Grand Rapids: Wm. B. Eerdmans, pp. 164–165, ISBN 0-8028-2413-7
- Ilko, Krisztina (2023). "Forging the Augustinian Past: The Rule-Giving of St Augustine in a Duecento Gradual". Gesta. 62 (1): 95–126. doi:10.1086/723217.
- Ilko, Krisztina (2021). "Recovering the Augustinian Convent of San Salvatore in Venetian Candia". Journal of Ecclesiastical History. 72 (2): 259–279. doi:10.1017/S0022046920000755.
- Hackett; Michael Benedict (2002). A Presence in the Age of Turmoil: English, Irish and Scottish Augustinians in the Reformation and Counter-Reformation. Augustinian Historical Institute, Villanova University, Pennsylvania. ISBN 1-889542-27-X.
- Hickey, P. J. (1981). A History of the Catholic Church in Northern Nigeria. Augustinian publications in Nigeria, Jos, Plateau State, Nigeria.
- edited by Martin; F. X. & Clare O'Reilly. The Irish Augustinians in Rome, 1656–1994 and Irish Augustinian Missions throughout the World. St. Patrick's College, Roma, Italy.
- Orbis Augustinianus sive conventuum O. Erem. S. A. chorographica et topographica descriptio Augustino Lubin, Paris, 1659, 1671, 1672.
- Rano, Balbino (1994). Augustinian Origins, Charism, and Spirituality. Villanova, PA: Augustinian Press.
- Règle de S. Augustin pour les réligieuses de son ordre; et Constitutions de la Congregation des Religieuses du Verbe-Incarne et du Saint-Sacrament (Lyon: Chez Pierre Guillimin, 1662), pp. 28–29. Cf. later edition published at Lyon (Chez Briday, Libraire, 1962), pp. 22–24. English edition, The Rule of Saint Augustine and the Constitutions of the Order of the Incarnate Word and Blessed Sacrament (New York: Schwartz, Kirwin, and Fauss, 1893), pp. 33–35.
- Zumkeller, Adolar (1986). Augustine's Ideal of the Religious Life. Fordham University Press, New York.
- Zumkeller, Adolar (1987). Augustine's Rule. Augustinian Press, Villanova, Pennsylvania.
