= Patrizi =

Patrizi is the name of:

- Antonio Patrizi (1280–1311), Italian Roman Catholic priest
- Francesco Patrizi of Siena (1413–1494), Italian political writer, humanist and bishop
- Agostino Patrizi de Piccolomini (died 1495), Roman Catholic prelate
- Franciscus Patricius (1529–1597), philosopher and scientist from the Republic of Venice
- Stefano Patrizi (1715–1797), Italian jurist and scholar
- Francis Xavier Patrizi (1797–1881), Italian Jesuit exegete
- Costantino Patrizi Naro (1798–1876), Italian Cardinal
- Michael Patrizi (born 1984), Australian race driver
- Hayden Patrizi (born 1985), Australian-born Italian cricketer
