= 2001–02 St Johnstone F.C. season =

St Johnstone
- Scottish Premier League: 12th
- Scottish Cup: Third Round
- Scottish League Cup: Third Round

The 2001–02 season saw St Johnstone compete in the Scottish Premier League where they finished in 12th position with 21 points, suffering relegation.

== Results ==
St Johnstone's score comes first

=== Legend ===
Win	Draw	Loss

=== Scottish Premier League ===
Match	Date	Opponent	Venue	Result	Attendance	Scorers
1	28 July 2001	Celtic	A	0–3	58,002	
2	4 August 2001	Dunfermline Athletic	H	0–2	4,701	
3	11 August 2001	Dundee United	H	0–1	5,156	
4	18 August 2001	Kilmarnock	A	1–2	6,480	Falconer 90'
5	25 August 2001	Aberdeen	H	1–1	5,459	Weir 46'
6	8 September 2001	Dundee	A	1–1	7,050	Jackson 73'
7	15 September 2001	Livingston	H	2–2	3,812	Falconer 16', MacDonald 50'
8	23 September 2001	Hibernian	A	0–4	10,404	
9	29 September 2001	Motherwell	H	2–3	3,269	Connolly 13', MacDonald 55'
10	13 October 2001	Heart of Midlothian	A	0–3	10,735	
11	21 October 2001	Rangers	H	0–2	8,331	
12	27 October 2001	Dunfermline Athletic	A	1–2	4,494	Hartley 4'
13	3 November 2001	Celtic	H	1–2	9,041	Dods 26'
14	10 November 2001	Kilmarnock	A	1–0	6,008	Falconer 39'
15	17 November 2001	Dundee United	A	1–2	6,624	Connolly 65'
16	24 November 2001	Kilmarnock	H	1–0	3,771	Russell 12'
17	1 December 2001	Aberdeen	A	0–1	17,396	
18	8 December 2001	Dundee	H	0–2	5,229	
19	15 December 2001	Livingston	A	1–2	4,563	Hartley 48'
20	22 December 2001	Hibernian	H	0–0	4,056	
21	26 December 2001	Motherwell	A	2–1	4,659	Murray 9', MacDonald 38'
22	29 December 2001	Rangers	A	0–1	48,827	
23	2 January 2002	Heart of Midlothian	H	0–2	5,413	
24	12 January 2002	Dunfermline Athletic	H	0–1	3,459	
25	19 January 2002	Celtic	A	1–2	58,587	Dods 6'
26	22 January 2002	Dundee United	H	1–4	3,771	Youssouf 65'
27	2 February 2002	Aberdeen	H	0–1	4,305	
28	9 February 2002	Dundee	A	0–1	6,344	
29	16 February 2002	Livingston	H	3–0	3,784	Hartley 44', Parker 80', Jones 90'
30	2 March 2002	Hibernian	A	0–3	13,731	
31	6 March 2002	Rangers	H	0–2	6,382	
32	9 March 2002	Motherwell	H	0–2	3,282	
33	23 March 2002	Heart of Midlothian	A	3–1	10,672	Løvenkrands 21', 31', McBride 39'
34	6 April 2002	Motherwell	A	1–1	3,418	Hartley 22'
35	13 April 2002	Dundee	H	0–1	3,055	
36	20 April 2002	Kilmarnock	H	0–3	2,285	
37	27 April 2002	Dundee United	A	0–0	5,190	
38	12 May 2002	Hibernian	H	0–1	3,372	

=== Scottish Cup ===
Match	Date	Opponent	Venue	Result	Attendance	Scorers
R3	8 January 2002	Aberdeen	H	0–2	4,070	

=== Scottish League Cup ===
Match	Date	Opponent	Venue	Result	Attendance	Scorers
R2	26 September 2001	Clyde	A	2–1	911	MacDonald 25', 86'
R3	9 October 2001	Dundee United	A	2–3	5,851	Hartley 9', Dods 36'

== Final league table ==
Pos	Team	Pld	W	D	L	GF	GA	GD	Pts	Qualification or relegation (Note: Teams played each other three times (33 matches), before the league split into two groups (the top six and the bottom six) for the last five matches.)
8	Dundee United	38	12	10	16	38	59	−21	46	
9	Dundee	38	12	8	18	41	55	−14	44	
10	Hibernian	38	10	11	17	51	56	−5	41	
11	Motherwell	38	11	7	20	49	69	−20	40	
12	St Johnstone (R)	38	5	6	27	24	62	−38	21	Relegation to the First Division

Source: Scottish Professional Football League
Rules for classification: (1) Points; (2) Goal difference; (3) Goals scored
(R) Relegated
