= Cariati =

- Comune
- Comune di Cariati
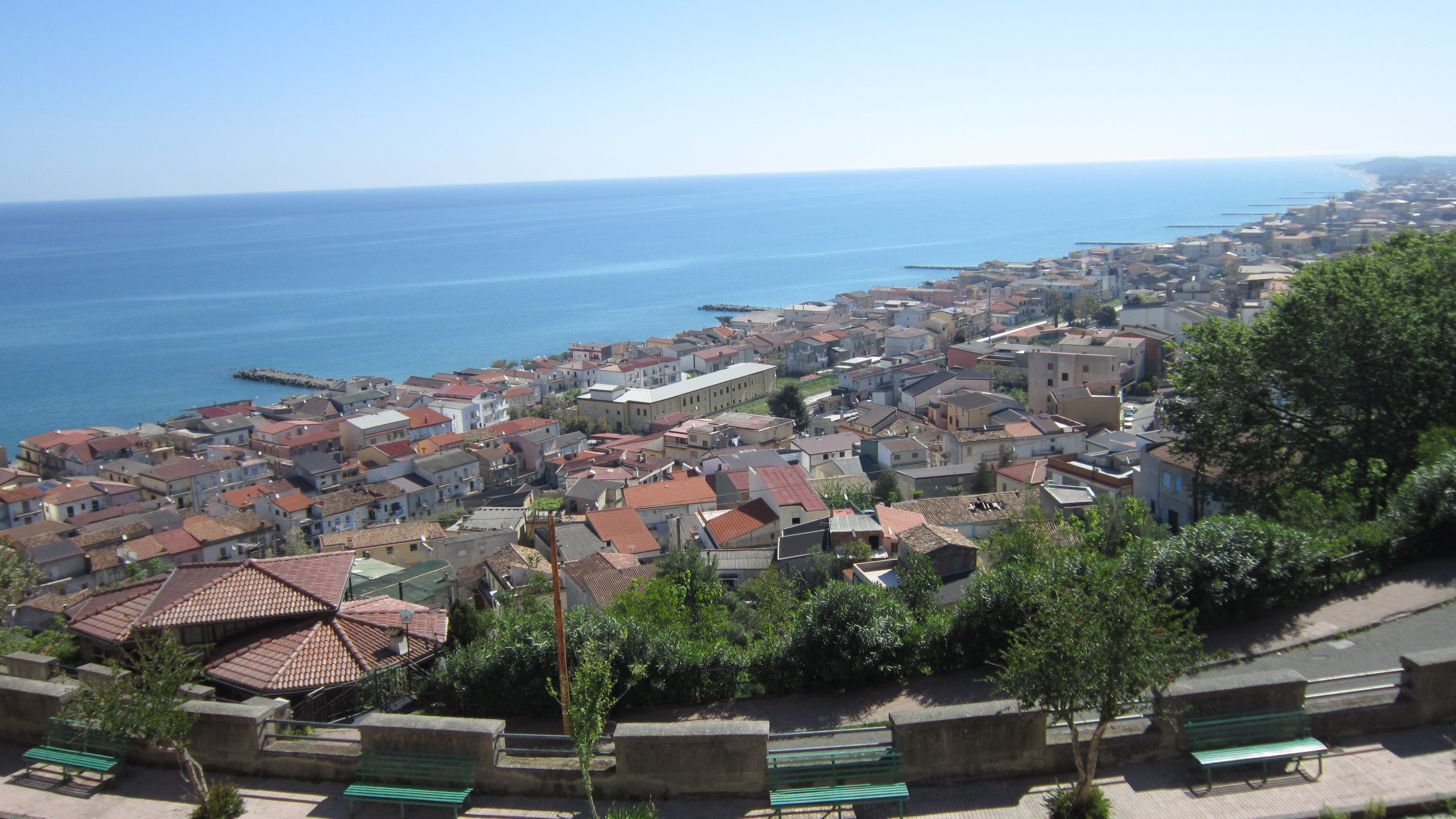

- Location within Italy Location within Calabria
- Coordinates: 39°30′N 16°57′E
- Country: Italy
- Region: Calabria
- Province: Cosenza (CS)
- Frazioni: Tramonti, San Cataldo, Santa Maria

Government
  - Mayor: Cataldo Minò

Area
  - Total: 27.95 km^{2} (10.79 sq mi)
- Elevation: 50 m (160 ft)

Population (2018-01-01)
  - Total: 8,156
  - Density: 291.8/km^{2} (755.8/sq mi)
- Demonym: Cariatesi
- Time zone: UTC+1 (CET)
  - Summer (DST): UTC+2 (CEST)
- Postal code: 87062
- Dialing code: 0983
- Patron saint: Leonard of Noblac
- Saint day: 6 November
- Website: Official website

Cariati is a town and comune (municipality) in the province of Cosenza in the Calabria region of southern Italy. The town is divided into two parts: Cariati Superiore, situated on top of a hill, and Cariati Marina, which is stretched along the Ionian coastline.

== Notable people ==
- Polissena Ruffo (1400–1420), princess
- Stefano Patrizi (1715–1797), jurist and scholar
- Francesco Cozza (born 1974), football player
- Domenico Maietta (born 1982), football player
- Marco Russo (born 1982), football player
- Domenico Berardi (born 1994), football player
- Antonio Fuoco (born 1996), racing driver
- Daniele Lavia (born 1999), volleyball player
