= Willie Falconer =

Scottish footballer

Personal information
- Full name: William Henry Falconer
- Date of birth: 5 April 1966 (age 60)
- Place of birth: Aberdeen, Scotland
- Positions: Striker; utility player

Youth career
- Aberdeen Lads Club
- 1981–1983: Aberdeen
- 1981–1982: → Lewis United

Senior career*
Years	Team	Apps	(Gls)
1983–1988	Aberdeen	78	(14)
1988–1991	Watford	71	(12)
1991–1993	Middlesbrough	53	(10)
1993–1994	Sheffield United	23	(4)
1994–1996	Celtic	42	(5)
1996–1998	Motherwell	58	(10)
1998–2001	Dundee	78	(17)
2001	Clydebank	1	(0)
2001–2002	St Johnstone	25	(3)
2002	Grimsby Town	2	(0)
2002–2003	Clyde	18	(4)
Total		449	(79)
- * Club domestic league appearances and goals

William Henry Falconer (born 5 April 1966) is a Scottish former professional footballer and coach.

As a player he was a striker and utility player who notably played in the Premier League for Middlesbrough and Sheffield United and in the Scottish Premier League for Aberdeen, Celtic, Motherwell, Dundee and St Johnstone. He also had spells in the Football League with Watford and Grimsby Town, as well as in the Scottish Football League for Clydebank and Clyde.

== Playing career ==
Falconer began his career playing for his home town club, Aberdeen, in 1982, and had an initial loan spell at Junior team Lewis United. During his six years at Pittodrie Stadium, he made 77 league appearances and scored 13 goals. Never more than a squad member other than in his final season, he did play enough games to earn a 1984–85 Scottish Premier Division winner's medal, and also played and scored in the 1987 Scottish League Cup Final (lost on penalties).

Falconer then moved south of the border to Watford for £300,000 in 1988. During his three years at Vicarage Road, he played 71 games, scoring 12 goals. He also gained a reputation as a no-nonsense, tough tackling midfielder, and was sent off the field on more than one occasion.

In 1991, Falconer transferred to Middlesbrough (then managed by Lennie Lawrence) in a swap deal involving Trevor Putney moving the other way. His first season at Boro was successful, with the team winning promotion from the old 2nd Division and entering the inaugural Premier League, and also reaching the semi-finals of the League Cup. However, the next season wasn't as happy as an ill-equipped Middlesbrough side were relegated from the Premier League. The following summer Falconer was sold to Sheffield United for £400,000.

After less than a season at Bramall Lane, in early 1994 Falconer was transferred back north of the border to Celtic for £350,000. Although only at the club for two years, and behind others such as Pierre van Hooijdonk and Andreas Thom for a place in the side, he became something of a cult hero in Glasgow. He came on as a substitute in the club's 1995 Scottish Cup Final win. His transfer also spelt the end for the Celtic board at that time, as the bank refused to pay his transfer fee. A transfer to Motherwell in January 1996 was followed by a free transfer in summer 1998 to Dundee to strengthen their newly promoted team, along with several other Motherwell players including Tommy Coyne.

After three successful years in the Scottish Premier League with Dundee, in which he played alongside Claudio Caniggia and was both top scorer and named their supporters' player of the year in 2000, Falconer's career involved four clubs in two years, playing for Clydebank, St Johnstone and Clyde in Scotland and Grimsby in England.

== Coaching career ==
Falconer returned to Motherwell to become a coach of the under-19 side for several years.

== Personal life ==
He has operated a property rental business in Scotland.

== Club statistics ==
Appearances and goals by club, season and competition
Club	Season	League			National Cup		League Cup		Europe		Total	
Club	Season	Division	Apps	Goals	Apps	Goals	Apps	Goals	Apps	Goals	Apps	Goals
Aberdeen	1982-83	Scottish Premier Division	1	0	0	0	0	0	1	0	2	0
Aberdeen	1983-84	Scottish Premier Division	9	2	0	0	5	0	1	0	15	2
Aberdeen	1984-85	Scottish Premier Division	16	4	0	0	1	0	2	0	19	4
Aberdeen	1985-86	Scottish Premier Division	8	0	0	0	1	0	1	1	10	1
Aberdeen	1986-87	Scottish Premier Division	8	0	0	0	1	0	1	0	10	0
Aberdeen	1987-88	Scottish Premier Division	36	8	5	1	2	1	4	1	47	11
Aberdeen	Total		78	14	5	1	10	1	10	2	103	18
Watford	1988-89	Second Division	-	-	-	-	-	-	-	-	-	-
Watford	1989-90	Second Division	-	-	-	-	-	-	-	-	-	-
Watford	1990-91	Second Division	-	-	-	-	-	-	-	-	-	-
Watford	Total		71	12	-	-	-	-	-	-	98	12
Middlesbrough	1991-92	Second Division	25	5	0	0	2	0	-	-	27	5
Middlesbrough	1992-93	Premier League	28	5	3	2	1	0	0	0	32	7
Middlesbrough	Total		53	10	3	2	3	0	0	0	59	12
Sheffield United	1993-94	Premier League	23	4	0	0	2	0	0	0	25	4
Celtic	1993-94	Scottish Premier Division	14	1	0	0	0	0	0	0	14	1
Celtic	1994-95	Scottish Premier Division	26	4	6	3	2	0	0	0	34	7
Celtic	1995-96	Scottish Premier Division	2	0	0	0	0	0	1	0	3	0
Celtic	Total		42	5	6	3	2	0	1	0	51	8
Motherwell	1995-96	Scottish Premier Division	16	5	2	0	1	0	0	0	19	5
Motherwell	1996-97	Scottish Premier Division	20	2	1	0	0	0	0	0	21	2
Motherwell	1997-98	Scottish Premier Division	22	3	4	0	3	1	0	0	29	4
Motherwell	Total		58	10	7	0	4	1	0	0	69	11
Dundee	1998-99	SPL	33	4	1	0	1	0	0	0	35	4
Dundee	1999-00	SPL	31	12	2	0	3	4	0	0	36	16
Dundee	2000-01	SPL	14	1	2	0	1	0	0	0	17	1
Dundee	Total		78	17	5	0	5	4	0	0	88	21
Clydebank	2001-02	Scottish Second Division	1	0	0	0	0	0	-	-	1	0
St Johnstone	2001-02	SPL	25	3	1	0	2	0	0	0	28	3
Grimsby Town	2001-02	First Division	2	0	0	0	0	0	-	-	2	0
Clyde	2002-03	Scottish First Division	18	4	2	0	0	0	-	-	20	4
Career total			449	79	29+	6+	28+	6+	11	2	544	93
