= Society of Saint Augustine =

Catholic institute in the United States

The Society of Saint Augustine (Latin: Societas Sancti Augustini), also known as the Augustinians of Kansas, is a Catholic institute of consecrated life that takes as its pattern of living, the way of life delineated in the Rule of Saint Augustine of Hippo. The community was founded on October 16, 1981, in Amarillo, Texas by four Augustinian Recollects.

== History ==
They were later joined later by two more Augustinians. As an Augustinian community, the Society of Saint Augustine is composed of priests, religious brothers, and lay people. It is rooted in the Augustinian Recollect tradition; however, it differs somewhat from many other Augustinian Communities in the fact that it places a great emphasis on the inclusion and involvement of the laity in the life and ministry of the community. Wherever a community house is established, the community focuses on extending Augustinian spirituality. Lay "affiliates" take part in Communal activities and regular formation. Affiliates are invited to join the friars in Daily Offices, communal events, and even in the apostolate, where appropriate. In turn, they extend Augustinian spirituality through their lives.

The members of the community are committed to living a traditional mendicant Augustinian Religious life, based on meditation and recollection, community prayer. Members wear the traditional religious Habit consisting of a black (or white) mendicant tunic, black leather cincture, scapular, and capuce. Over this, they wear a silver Augustinian Cross. Members may also wear a rosary. They celebrate the daily Divine Office, practice a simplicity of life, and are to be faithful to the Rule of Saint Augustine. Drawing from the various reform movements in the Augustinian Tradition (the Spanish Recollection, The Observantine Congregation of the Augustinian Order, etc.), the Society of Saint Augustine seeks to adapt aspects of traditional Augustinian Religious Life to the contemporary needs of the Society.

The community transferred to the Archdiocese of Kansas City in 1997 when it was invited by Archbishop James P. Keleher to minister in that diocese. While fostering the "active/contemplative" dimension of Augustinian Religious Life, the Society of Augustine involves itself in a broad spectrum of ministries, including parochial and pastoral care, adult catechesis, Hispanic ministry, teaching, direction of retreats and military chaplaincy. The community focuses on pro-life issues.

Presently, this community of friars has two houses: Villa Saint Augustine, in Kansas City, which serves as the Administrative Center for the Community; and Villa Ostia, a retreat house in upstate New York. In April 2009, Archbishop Joseph Naumann of Kansas City entrusted two parishes to their care: Holy Family Parish and St. Mary–St. Anthony Parish. (St. Anthony Parish had formerly been entrusted to Franciscan Friars who had left some time ago.)

The Religious Sisters affiliated with the Society, while sharing in the charism of the community, are governed separately from the Friars. Currently, the Augustinian Recollect Sisters of our Lady of Consolation, have one convent in Topeka, Kansas.

== Purpose ==
The Society of Saint Augustine exists to live a life rooted in the spiritual teachings of Saint Augustine. Its members—both religious and lay—focus on building a close-knit community grounded in prayer, reflection, and service. They aim to blend a quiet, contemplative lifestyle with active involvement in ministries like teaching, pastoral care, and social outreach, especially among diverse communities. The Society also emphasizes simplicity, shared spiritual life, and encouraging laypeople to take part in their mission.
