= 1987–88 Aberdeen F.C. season =

Aberdeen F.C.
1987-88 season
- Chairman: Dick Donald
- Manager: Ian Porterfield
- Scottish Premier Division: 4th
- Scottish Cup: Semi final
- Scottish League Cup: Final
- UEFA Cup: Second round
- Top goalscorer: League: Jim Bett (10); All: Davie Dodds (15)
- Highest home attendance: 24,000 vs. Celtic, 1 September 1987
- Lowest home attendance: 5,500 vs. Motherwell, 7 May 1988
- Average home league attendance: 13,460

Aberdeen F.C. competed in the Scottish Premier Division, Scottish Cup, Scottish League Cup and UEFA Cup in season 1987–88.

== Overview ==
Aberdeen finished fourth in the Premier Division for the second successive season. They reached the League Cup final, but lost 5–3 on penalty kicks after a 3–3 draw against Rangers in October. In the Scottish Cup, they lost in the semi-final after a second replay defeat to Dundee United. Aberdeen's UEFA Cup campaign ended in a second round defeat to Dutch club Feyenoord on the away goals rule, after defeating Irish club Bohemian F.C. in the first round.

New signings included Peter Nicholas from Luton Town, Gary Hackett, Tom Jones, Keith Edwards and Charlie Nicholas, who joined from Arsenal in December 1987.

== Results ==
=== Scottish Premier Division ===
Match Day	Date	Opponent	H/A	Score	Aberdeen Scorer(s)	Attendance
1	8 August	Dundee	A	1–1	Dodds	10,223
2	12 August	Morton	H	3–1	Simpson, Dodds, J. Miller	8,000
3	15 August	Rangers	H	2–0	Dodds, P. Nicholas	22,500
4	22 August	Motherwell	A	1–0	Dodds	4,858
5	29 August	Dundee United	H	1–1	Bett	16,000
6	5 September	Falkirk	A	2–2	J. Miller, Falconer	5,327
7	12 September	St Mirren	H	2–0	J. Miller, Falconer	11,000
8	19 September	Celtic	A	2–2	J. Miller, P. Nicholas	38,944
9	26 September	Hibernian	A	2–0	Grant, Falconer	10,500
10	3 October	Dunfermline Athletic	H	3–0	P. Nicholas, Falconer, Edwards	11,313
11	7 October	Heart of Midlothian	A	1–2	Bett	17,741
12	10 October	Dundee	H	0–0		12,500
13	17 October	Dundee United	A	0–0		11,281
14	28 October	St Mirren	A	3–1	Bett (2), Falconer	4,707
15	31 October	Celtic	H	0–1		21,000
16	7 November	Morton	A	0–0		3,000
17	14 November	Heart of Midlothian	H	0–0		20,000
18	17 November	Rangers	A	1–0	W. Miller	41,371
19	21 November	Motherwell	H	1–0	Dodds	9,700
20	24 November	Hibernian	H	1–1	Edwards	9,000
21	28 November	Dunfermline Athletic	A	3–0	Wright, Jones	7,500
22	5 December	Dundee	A	2–1	Wright (2), Dodds	8,799
23	9 December	Falkirk	H	3–1	Wright, Dodds, Bett	8,000
24	12 December	Morton	H	4–0	Connor, Dodds, Bett (2)	8,000
25	16 December	St Mirren	H	2–1	W. Miller, Bett	6,500
26	19 December	Celtic	A	0–0		37,721
27	26 December	Falkirk	A	2–0	McLeish, Hewitt	5,000
28	2 January	Dundee United	H	0–0		21,500
29	9 January	Hibernian	A	0–0		16,000
30	16 January	Dunfermline Athletic	H	1–0	Falconer	20,000
31	23 January	Motherwell	A	1–2	C. Nicholas	6,584
32	6 February	Rangers	H	1–2	Bett	22,500
33	13 February	Heart of Midlothian	A	2–2	Bett, Jones	18,817
34	27 February	Dundee	H	1–0	Dodds	13,500
35	5 March	St Mirren	A	0–0		4,858
36	19 March	Dundee United	A	2–0	Jones, C. Nicholas	10,403
37	26 March	Falkirk	H	2–0	Falconer, W. Miller	9,410
38	30 March	Celtic	H	0–1		22,700
39	2 April	Dunfermline Athletic	A	1–1	Falconer	7,132
40	16 April	Morton	A	2–0	C. Nicholas, Porteous	3,200
41	23 April	Heart of Midlothian	H	0–0		10,500
42	30 April	Rangers	A	1–0	Irvine	36,010
43	4 May	Hibernian	H	0–2		7,000
44	7 May	Motherwell	H	0–0		5,500

==== Final standings ====
Pos	Team	Pld	W	D	L	GF	GA	GD	Pts	Qualification or relegation
2	Heart of Midlothian	44	23	16	5	74	32	+42	62	Qualification for the UEFA Cup first round
3	Rangers	44	26	8	10	85	34	+51	60	Qualification for the UEFA Cup first round
4	Aberdeen	44	21	17	6	56	25	+31	59	Qualification for the UEFA Cup first round
5	Dundee United	44	16	15	13	54	47	+7	47	Qualification for the Cup Winners' Cup first round
6	Hibernian	44	12	19	13	41	42	−1	43	

Source: Statto
Rules for classification: 1) points; 2) goal difference; 3) number of goals scored.

=== Scottish League Cup ===
Round	Date	Opponent	H/A	Score	Aberdeen Scorer(s)	Attendance
R2	18 August	Brechin City	H	5–1	Irvine, J. Miller (3), Hewitt	9,000
R3	26 August	St Johnstone	H	3–0	Dodds (2), Bett	10,800
QF	1 September	Celtic	H	1–0	Bett	24,000
SF	23 September	Dundee	N	2–0	Irvine, Connor	22,034
F	25 October	Rangers	N	3–3 (Rangers win 5–3 on penalties)	Hewitt, Bett, Falconer	71,961

=== Scottish Cup ===
Round	Date	Opponent	H/A	Score	Aberdeen Scorer(s)	Attendance
R3	30 January	St Johnstone	A	1–0	Connor	10,000
R4	20 February	Hamilton Academical	A	2–0	Dodds, Nicholas	7,270
QF	12 March	Clyde	H	5–0	Falconer, Dodds (3), Edwards	12,000
SF	9 April	Dundee United	N	0–0		20,488
SF R	13 April	Dundee United	N	1–1	Nicholas	17,288
SF R2	20 April	Dundee United	N	0–1		19,048

=== UEFA Cup ===
Round	Date	Opponent	H/A	Score	Aberdeen Scorer(s)	Attendance
R1 L1	15 September	(Republic of Ireland) Bohemians	A	0–0		10,000
R1 L2	30 September	(Republic of Ireland) Bohemians	H	1–0	Bett	9,950
R2 L1	21 October	(Netherlands) Feyenoord	H	2–1	Falconer, J. Miller	16,000
R2 L2	4 November	(Netherlands) Feyenoord	A	0–1		26,390

== Squad ==
=== Appearances & Goals ===
No.	Pos	Nat	Player	Total		Premier Division		Scottish Cup		League Cup		Europe	
No.	Pos	Nat	Player	Apps	Goals	Apps	Goals	Apps	Goals	Apps	Goals	Apps	Goals
	MF	(Scotland) SCO	Jim Bett	50	14	38	10	4	0	5	3	3	1
	MF	(Scotland) SCO	Bobby Connor	45	3	34	1	4	1	3	1	4	0
	FW	(Scotland) SCO	Davie Dodds	30	15	23	9	5	4	2	2	0	0
	FW	(England) ENG	Keith Edwards	10	3	9	2	1	1	0	0	0	0
	FW	(Scotland) SCO	Willie Falconer	46	11	36	8	5	1	1	1	4	1
	MF	(Scotland) SCO	Lee Gardner	1	0	1	0	0	0	0	0	0	0
	MF	(Scotland) SCO	Brian Grant	11	1	7	1	1	0	2	0	1	0
	MF	(Scotland) SCO	Stevie Gray	8	0	7	0	1	0	0	0	0	0
	MF	(England) ENG	Gary Hackett	22	0	15	0	2	0	3	0	2	0
	DF	(Scotland) SCO	Scott Harvie	1	0	1	0	0	0	0	0	0	0
	FW	(Scotland) SCO	John Hewitt	49	3	35	1	5	0	5	2	4	0
	DF	(Scotland) SCO	Brian Irvine	22	3	16	1	1	0	4	2	1	0
	FW	(England) ENG	Tom Jones	31	3	28	3	3	0	0	0	0	0
	GK	(Scotland) SCO	Jim Leighton	59	0	44	0	6	0	5	0	4	0
	MF	(Scotland) SCO	Michael McArthur	3	0	3	0	0	0	0	0	0	0
	DF	(Scotland) SCO	Stewart McKimmie	55	0	42	0	5	0	5	0	3	0
	DF	(Scotland) SCO	Alex McLeish	47	1	36	1	5	0	2	0	4	0
	FW	(Scotland) SCO	Joe Miller	23	8	14	4	0	0	5	3	4	1
	DF	(Scotland) SCO	Willie Miller (c)	57	3	42	3	6	0	5	0	4	0
	FW	(Scotland) SCO	Charlie Nicholas	22	5	16	3	6	2	0	0	0	0
	FW	(Wales) WAL	Peter Nicholas	54	3	39	3	6	0	5	0	4	0
	MF	(Scotland) SCO	Ian Porteous	3	1	3	1	0	0	0	0	0	0
	DF	(Scotland) SCO	David Robertson	33	0	23	0	4	0	4	0	2	0
	MF	(Scotland) SCO	Neil Simpson	24	1	15	1	4	0	3	0	2	0
	MF	(Scotland) SCO	Peter Weir	9	0	5	0	0	0	1	0	3	0
	FW	(Scotland) SCO	Paul Wright	9	4	9	4	0	0	0	0	0	0
