= Dave Rogers (footballer, born 1975) =

English footballer (born 1975)

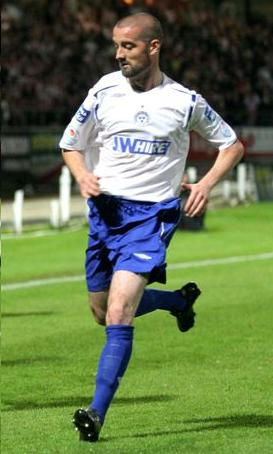

Personal information
- Full name: David Raymond Rogers
- Date of birth: 25 August 1975 (age 51)
- Place of birth: Liverpool, England
- Position: Centre-back

Youth career
- 1983–1990: Everton
- 1990–1994: Tranmere Rovers

Senior career*
Years	Team	Apps	(Gls)
1994–1995	Tranmere Rovers	0	(0)
1995–1996	Chester City	25	(1)
1996–1997	Southport	23	(1)
1997–1999	Dundee	43	(1)
1999–2001	Ayr United	16	(1)
2000	→ Partick Thistle (loan)	6	(0)
2000	→ Peterborough United (loan)	3	(0)
2001	Scunthorpe United	1	(0)
2001–2002	Carlisle United	45	(1)
2002–2003	Cambuur	22	(3)
2003–2007	Shelbourne	114	(4)
2007	Derry City	12	(0)
2007–2009	St Patrick's Athletic	25	(0)
2008	→ Sporting Fingal (loan)	15	(0)
2009	Dundalk	11	(0)
2009–2010	Lisburn Distillery	10	(0)
2010	Cork City	13	(0)
2010–2011	Limerick	13	(0)
2011	Monaghan United	7	(0)
2011–2012	Drogheda United	5	(1)
2012–2013	Bohemians	0	(0)

Managerial career
- 2016–2018: DSK Shivajians
- 2019–2021: FC Arizona
- 2022–2023: Finn Harps
- 2024: Balzan
- 2025: Coventry under 15 team
- * Club domestic league appearances and goals

Dave Rogers (born 25 August 1975) is an English football coach and former player. Who is currently Head coach of NIFL Boyle Sport side Armagh City.

== Playing career ==
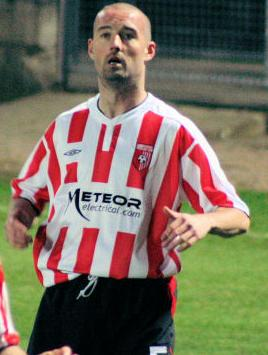
Rogers in action for Derry City on his debut against Newry City during a 2007 pre-season friendly

Rogers was born in Liverpool, England. With his previous club, Shelbourne, he had quite a successful spell. He joined them from Dutch club Cambuur Leeuwarden in June 2003. Rogers made his debut that same month against Derry City, the club he would later join in the future, and quickly established himself as a key player in the side of Pat Fenlon, who was the Shelbourne manager at the time. He won the League of Ireland championship with Shelbourne in 2003, 2004, and 2006.

"Scouser", as he is known by most was one of the favourite players of the club's fans, especially after his volley in the UEFA Champions League second qualifying round against the Croatian champions Hajduk Split.

His goal spurred Shels on to a famous victory and made the Reds the first Irish team to make it to the Champions League third qualifying round. However, the club was downtrodden with financial difficulties and unable to sustain its first-team squad by early 2007,

His former manager, Fenlon, who had taken the managerial position at Derry City in December 2006, convinced him that the Brandywell was the new place for him, and his signing of a two-year contract was announced by Derry City on 28 January 2007.

He made his debut for his new club during a pre-season friendly game against Newry City prior to the beginning of the League of Ireland 2007 season.

He then signed for St Patrick's Athletic during the June transfer market and played in their UEFA Cup 1st Qualifying Round against OB Odense of Denmark.

Rogers had earlier played in the Football League for Chester City, Peterborough United, Scunthorpe United and Carlisle United, and was at Tranmere Rovers. He also played in Scotland for Ayr United and Dundee in the Scottish Premier league and also won the Scottish First Division title with Dundee in the 1997–98 season.

Rogers joined Sporting Fingal on loan from St Patrick's Athletic on 27 February 2008. He returned to the Saints on 1 July. On 22 November he along with 8 other St. Patrick's Athletic players left on a free transfer.

In August 2009 Rogers signed for Lisburn Distillery but after four months both parties agreed to part by mutual consent and on good terms.

In March 2010 Rogers signed for newly formed Cork City FORAS Co-op. On 5 June 2010, Rogers departed the club by mutual consent. He made 15 league and cup appearances for Cork. is first goal for t In June 2010, Rogers signed for Limerick and had a short spell with Monaghan United before joining Drogheda United in July 2011 and was immediately named captain. His first goal for the Drogs came from the penalty spot in a 2–2 draw with Dundalk at Hunky Dorys Park.

In January 2012, Rogers decided to hang up his playing boots after a 20-year career and focus on the transition on becoming a coach by concentrating on his coaching qualifications

== Managerial career ==
In 2013, Rogers was appointed as lead coach for Liverpool F.C.'s International Academy overseeing the club curriculum and coach education around Europe. Rogers was then appointed to Academy Manager of Liverpool F.C.'s residential academy in India.

In 2015 Rogers was recruited by the then India national team manager Stephen Constantine to become assistant coach for the SAFF Championship success. 2016 would then see Rogers appointment as head Coach of DSK Shivajians FC in of the Indian I-League on a three-year contract. The club declared bankruptcy after one season which saw Rogers then reappointed as Liverpool F.C. International Academy Manager in South Korea.

On 2 December 2022, Rogers was announced as manager of Finn Harps on a four-year contract. and with the club doing poorly and in the bottom 2 of the Irish second division, on 23 September 2023, the club announced that Rogers had left the club due to 'personal and family reasons'.

On 3 June 2024, Rogers was appointed manager of Maltese Premier League side Balzan on a two-year contract. He left Malta and the club prematurely in October 2024 with 'personal reasons' being cited as the official reason for his departure. With the Balzan first team only having won 2 games from its first 11 games and firmly at the bottom of the Malta Premier League table and with the Balzan under 21 team, which Rogers was also ultimately responsible for, also anchored to the foot of the table, his sudden departure didn't really surprise many.

== Honours ==
Shelbourne

- League of Ireland Premier Division: 2003, 2004, 2006

Dundee

- Scottish First Division: 1997–98
