= Marcello Marrocco =

Italian footballer

Personal information
- Date of birth: June 7, 1969 (age 57)
- Place of birth: Bülach, Switzerland
- Height: 1.77 m (5 ft 10 in)
- Position: Defender

Senior career*
Years	Team	Apps	(Gls)
1988–1991	Potenza	88	(3)
1991–1993	Ravenna	60	(0)
1993–1994	Carpi	26	(0)
1994–1997	Ravenna	85	(2)
1997–1998	Genoa	22	(0)
1998–1999	Ternana	14	(1)
1999–2000	Modena	10	(0)
2000–2003	Dundee	36	(0)
- * Club domestic league appearances and goals

Marcello Marrocco (born June 7, 1969 in Bülach, Switzerland) is a retired Italian professional footballer who played in Serie B for Ravenna Calcio and in the Scottish Premier League with Dundee F.C.

After he retired from playing football, Marrocco founded a football technology business with former footballer, and his former manager and teammate at Dundee, Ivano Bonetti.
