= Marco Russo =

Italian former footballer (born 1982)

Personal information
- Date of birth: 25 April 1982 (age 44)
- Place of birth: Cariati, Italy
- Height: 1.74 m (5 ft 8 1/2 in)
- Position: Midfielder

Youth career
- ?–1998: Reggina

Senior career*
Years	Team	Apps	(Gls)
1998–1999	Padova	1	(0)
1999–2000	Birmingham	0	(0)
2000–2001	Dundee	4	(0)
2001–2002	Poggese	12	(0)
2002–2003	Cassino	6	(0)
2003	Villacidrese	24	(0)
2003–2005	Sassari Torres	54	(2)
2005–2006	Vittoria	18	(0)
2006–2008	Lumezzane	70	(4)
2008–2009	Pizzighettone	22	(3)
2009–2010	Canavese	25	(2)
2010–2011	Virtus Entella	25	(0)
2011	Aurora Seriate		

International career
1998	Italy U15	4	(0)
- * Club domestic league appearances and goals

Marco Russo (born 25 April 1982) is a former Italian footballer who most recently played for Aurora Seriate.

== Biography ==
Born in Cariati, Calabria, southern Italy, Russo started his career at Calabrian side Reggina. He then left for the northern Italian side Padova, then left for the United Kingdom for Birmingham and in November 2000 for Dundee. He was signed by assistant manager, countryman Ivano Bonetti along with defender Umberto Fatello. In June 2001 he was released by the Scottish side and returned to Italy for Serie C2 side Poggese.

After the team was relegated, he spent one season in the non-professional league, Serie D, for Cassino and Villacidrese.

In summer 2003, he left for Serie C1 side Sassari Torres and in summer 2005 left for Vittoria of Serie C2. But his contract with the Sicily side was terminated in February 2006. and joined Serie C1 side Lumezzane. He followed the team relegated to Serie C2 and remained for 2 seasons, and won promotion back to Serie C1 (which renamed to Lega Pro Prima Divisione) in summer 2008.

He then moved back to Lega Pro Seconda Divisione for Pizzighettone. and in 2009–10 season left for Canavese after Pizzighettone relegated.

In November 2011 he joined Serie D club Aurora Seriate.
