= Russell Kelly (footballer) =

Northern Irish footballer

Personal information
- Full name: Russell James Kelly
- Date of birth: 10 August 1976 (age 50)
- Place of birth: Ballymoney, Northern Ireland
- Height: 1.80 m (5 ft 11 in)
- Position: Midfielder

Senior career*
Years	Team	Apps	(Gls)
1995–1996	Chelsea	0	(0)
1996	→ Leyton Orient (loan)	6	(0)
1996–1997	Darlington	23	(2)
1997	St Mirren	4	(0)
1997–1998	Dundee	20	(2)
1998	Þór Akureyri		
1998–2000	Ayr United	21	(1)
2000	Partick Thistle	2	(1)
2000–2003	Linfield		
- * Club domestic league appearances and goals

Russell James Kelly (born 10 August 1976) is a Northern Irish former footballer who played as a midfielder. Kelly played for Leyton Orient and Darlington in the English Football League and had later spells with clubs in the Scottish League and in Iceland, before finishing his career with Linfield in the Irish League.

== Playing career ==
Kelly began his career with Chelsea but did not make a first team appearance. He had a two-month loan spell beginning in March 1996 with Third Division club Leyton Orient before joining Darlington in August, then also of the Third Division. He scored two goals in 23 games for the Quakers, scoring in a 1–1 draw with Rochdale and a 5–2 victory over Lincoln City.

He then moved to Scottish football, signing for St Mirren in August 1997. Although he scored in the Scottish League Cup, he left the club in September to join Dundee where he won the Scottish First Division. After a season there, he dropped a division to sign for Ayr United after a short spell in Iceland. He left Ayr for a short spell with Partick Thistle in March 2000.

Kelly joined Linfield in November 2000; the fans funded his signing. He made a great start to his Blues career, scoring in December against arch-rivals Glentoran. He also played for Linfield in UEFA Champions League qualifying against Torpedo Kutaisi. Kelly was released by Linfield in May 2003.

== Honours ==
Linfield

- Irish League: 2000–01
- Irish Cup: 2001–02
- Irish League Cup: 2001–02
- County Antrim Shield: 2000–01
