= Patrizio Billio =

Italian footballer (1974–2023)

Personal information
- Date of birth: 19 April 1974
- Place of birth: Treviso, Italy
- Date of death: 23 January 2023 (aged 48)
- Height: 1.80 m (5 ft 11 in)
- Position: Midfielder

Youth career
- 1990–1992: Milan

Senior career*
Years	Team	Apps	(Gls)
1992–1998	Milan	0	(0)
1993–1994	→ Ravenna (loan)	17	(1)
1994–1995	→ Verona (loan)	20	(1)
1995–1996	→ Casarano (loan)	25	(0)
1996–1997	→ Ternana (loan)	8	(0)
1997–1998	→ Monza (loan)	0	(0)
1998	Crystal Palace	4	(0)
1998–1999	Ancona	11	(0)
1999–2002	Dundee	28	(2)
2002	Aberdeen	10	(1)
2003	Livorno	4	(0)
2003–2004	Sora	30	(2)
2005–2006	Pro Sesto	34	(1)
2006–2008	Massese	44	(0)
2008–2009	Pro Sesto	0	(0)
2009–2010	Colligiana	34	(2)
- * Club domestic league appearances and goals

Patrizio Billio (19 April 1974 – 23 January 2023) was an Italian footballer who played as a midfielder.

== Biography ==
Billio was born in Treviso, Italy on 19 April 1974. He had a degree in Sports Management from the Catholic University of Milan.

== Career ==
Billio started his professional career at A.C. Milan, playing with the youth academy before being promoted to the senior squad. He then played for Ravenna, Verona (both Serie B), Casarano (Serie C1), Ternana (Serie C2), Ancona.

In January 1998, he joined Crystal Palace in the Premier League, making his debut as a substitute in a win against Newcastle United at St James' Park. Billio then played for Ancona for a short period of time before signing with Dundee in October 1999. After excellent performances, the club renewed for three more seasons. Not long after, however, he and fellow Italian player Marco De Marchi had major conflicts with the new management, most notably manager Ivano Bonetti. They were removed unfairly from the first team and within a few months were required to practice alone or with the youth team. In January 2002, Billio alleged that he was headbutted by a man with a skinhead haircut outside of Dens Park and that his car was stolen from his home. There was speculation about whether Dundee executive Paul Marr had been involved in the attack, but he was later acquitted in court. FIFA decided to release him from his contract shortly thereafter and was signed by Aberdeen on a free transfer in August 2002. He scored his first goal for the club in a 3–1 win over Dunfermline. He decided to leave Aberdeen in December 2002, and he signed for Livorno of Serie B.

He then played for Sora (Serie C1, 2003–04, 2004-5 January), Pro Sesto (January 2005 – 2006, Serie C1 &C2) and Massese (Serie C1). He returned to Pro Sesto in 2008 Serie C1 and successively returned to Tuscany in January 2009 to join Lega Pro Seconda Divisione club Colligiana, where he finished his career.

== Retirement ==
Following his retirement in 2011, Billio joined the LOYAC AC Milan Soccer School in Kuwait as the technical director and head coach. He had expressed interest in opening an AC Milan Soccer School arm in Dundee.

== Death ==
Billio died from a heart attack on 23 January 2023, at the age of 48.
