= Beto Carranza =

Argentine footballer (born 1972)

Personal information
- Full name: Luis Alberto Carranza
- Date of birth: 15 June 1972 (age 54)
- Place of birth: Quilmes, Argentina
- Height: 1.72 m (5 ft 8 in)
- Position: Midfielder

Senior career*
Years	Team	Apps	(Gls)
1991–1992	Racing Club	51	(6)
1992–1995	Boca Juniors	82	(10)
1995	Independiente	14	(0)
1996	San Lorenzo	6	(2)
1997	Veracruz		
1998–1999	Estudiantes	6	(0)
2000	Universitario de Deportes	18	(5)
2000–2003	Dundee	55	(4)
2003	Raith Rovers	2	(0)
2004	Quilmes	4	(0)
2005	Club Alumni de Villa María		
2005	Guaraní	4	(1)
2006	Almirante Brown		
2007–2009	Ceramica Argentina		
2009	Deportivo Mac Allister		

International career
1994	Argentina	1	(0)
- * Club domestic league appearances and goals

Luis Alberto "Trapito" Carranza (born 15 June 1972) is an Argentine former professional footballer who played as a midfielder.

== Career ==
Carranza started his career in 1991 with Racing Club de Avellaneda. In 1992, he joined Boca Juniors where he was part of the squad that won the Apertura 1992 and the Copa de Oro. He played a total of 106 games for the club in all competitions, scoring 13 goals.

Carranza then had a spell with Racing Club's fiercest rivals; Independiente before joining San Lorenzo where he became a key player.

After suffering an injury in Argentina, Carranza had a short spell in Mexico with Veracruz before returning to Argentina to play for Estudiantes de La Plata.

In 2000 Carranza played for Peruvian side Universitario de Deportes and then in October 2000 Carranza joined Dundee, where he partnered with Claudio Caniggia in midfield. Carranza, like the majority of players at Dundee, suffered redundancy in November 2003 but signed for Raith Rovers two days later in a short-term deal.

Carranza returned to Argentina to play for his hometown club Quilmes Atlético Club. He then had a spell with Club Alumni de Villa María in the lower leagues of Argentine football.

In 2005 Carranza played for Guaraní of Paraguay before returning to the lower leagues of Argentine football to play for Almirante Brown and then Ceramica Argentina of Chivilcoy.
