= Gregorio Celli =

Italian priest

Blessed Gregorio Celli O.S.A.
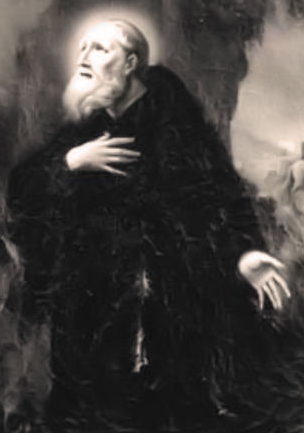

Priest
- Born: 1225 (purportedly); Verucchio, Rimini, Papal States
- Died: 11 May 1343 (possibly aged 118); Monte Carnerio, Rieti, Papal States
- Venerated in: Roman Catholic Church
- Beatified: 6 September 1769, Saint Peter's Basilica, Papal States by Pope Clement XIV
- Feast: 11 May
- Attributes: Augustinian habit; Franciscan habit; Crucifix; Iron ring around the waist
- Patronage: Against drought

Gregorio Celli (1225 (purportedly) – 11 May 1343) was an Italian priest of the Roman Catholic Church and a professed member of the Order of Saint Augustine. Celli lived with the latter order in Rimini until he decided to spend the remainder of his life in deep contemplation and so moved to the region's hills where he dwelled in a cave near the Franciscans stationed there. It is claimed he was expelled from his order and became a Franciscan though there is no evidence to support this claim.

His beatification received approval from Pope Clement XIV on 6 September 1769 after the pontiff confirmed the late friar's local 'cultus' - otherwise known as popular and enduring veneration.

== Life ==
Gregorio Celli was born in Rimini. His father died in his childhood. He was baptized in the church of Saint Martin.

Each evening his mother would set off for the local church to find her son there who remained entranced with the Gregorian Chant. His mother's relations - despite being devout - feared that Celli would not follow in his father's footsteps to become a doctor of law but rather that he would consider the religious life. In 1240 he was admitted into the Order of Saint Augustine and his mother became a third order religious. He travelled to the convent on a mule for admission to commence his period of novitiate and in 1242 he had become a well-noted and regarded figure in the convent for his penances and strict adherence to the rule of Saint Augustine. He made his solemn profession into the hands of the order's superior Matteo de Modena. It was Brother Matteo who later selected Celli to preach and hear confessions in the region despite the latter not being an ordained priest - though he was soon ordained as such at the successful conclusion of his ecclesiastical studies. It was during this period that he preached against the heresies of Catharism and he even met the famous heretic Armanno Pungilupo. In 1256 he witnessed the Grand Union of the order.

In 1300 he set off for Rome to participate in the Jubilee that Pope Boniface VIII called for and he visited each of the tombs of the Apostles. In 1300 he decided to withdraw from the active life of the apostolate he had served for decades in favor of a more contemplative existence somewhere in the hills surrounding the region he lived in. He confided this to Agostino Novello - the general of the order - and the general embraced and encouraged him. He lived in a cave where he spent the remainder of his life in reflection and fasting.

Gregorio Celli died in mid-1343. His remains are now interred in the church of Saint Augustine in Verucchio.

== Beatification ==
Citizens in Rimini requested on numerous occasions that a beatification process be opened and it was believed that Pope Innocent VI drew up a decree for the actual beatification itself in 1357. People in Rimini again began pushing for beatification in 1757. The beatification was later approved on 6 September 1769 after Pope Clement XIV issued a formal decree that acknowledged the fact that there existed a spontaneous and enduring local 'cultus' - otherwise known as popular veneration - to the late monk.
