= Sammy Youssouf =

Danish footballer (born 1976)

Personal information
- Date of birth: 7 September 1976 (age 50)
- Place of birth: Copenhagen, Denmark
- Height: 1.84 m (6 ft 0 in)
- Position: Forward

Youth career
- Rikken FC

Senior career*
Years	Team	Apps	(Gls)
–1998	Fremad Valby		
1998–2000	Fremad Amager	3	(3)
2000–2002	Hvidovre IF	25	(13)
2002	St Johnstone	5	(1)
2002–2003	AB	24	(12)
2003–2005	Roosendaal	31	(7)
2005–2006	Marítimo	5	(1)
2006	Queens Park Rangers	6	(0)
2006–2007	Viborg FF	14	(1)
2007–2009	Vejle BK	9	(2)
- * Club domestic league appearances and goals

Sammy Youssouf (born 7 September 1976) was a Danish professional football player, who ended his professional career representing Vejle Boldklub in the Danish Superliga.

Youssouf signed for St Johnstone in January 2002, and scored on his debut in a 4–1 loss to Dundee United. He signed for Queens Park Rangers in January 2006.

Youssouf made his debut for Vejle Boldklub on 5 August 2007 scoring one goal in the 2–1 win against Skive IK. In the summer of 2009, he had to retire from professional football due to injuries.
