= Stefano Patrizi =

Italian jurist and scholar

Stefano Patrizi (30 September 1715 – 27 October 1797) was an Italian jurist and scholar.

== Biography ==
He was born in Cariati in Calabria. As a young man, he moved to Naples and was educated under Nicola Fraggianni and the abbot Genovesi. Trained in law, he was appointed as judge of the Vicaria Civile in 1761. A defender of Royal privileges, he was patronized by King Charles Bourbon and his minister Bernardo Tanucci. He then gained appointment as consiglieri nel sacro consiglio and capo-ruota della Real Camera di Santa Chiara. He was appointed professor of law at the University of Naples. In 1770, he published volume 1 of Consultazione, along with the theologian Giovanni Andrea Serao as editor. In 1781, Patrizi was granted a hereditary title of Marchese. In 1789, he was appointed vice-president of the Royal Tribunal of War. He was an honorary associate of the Neapolitan Academy of Arts and Sciences. The Science Lyceum in Cariati is named after him. He corresponded with numerous scholars, from the writers Saverio Mattei and Lorenzo Giustiniani, to the poet Pietro Metastasio, and the judge Nicola Fraggianni. He is considered one of the members of society attempting to bring the Enlightenment ideas to Neapolitan governance and society. For example, he claimed some of the transactions carried out by members of the wealthy monastic orders in Naples were practicing Simony.
