= Javier Artero =

Spanish footballer

Personal information
- Full name: Javier Artero López
- Date of birth: 16 April 1975 (age 51)
- Place of birth: Madrid, Spain
- Height: 1.86 m (6 ft 1 in)
- Position: Midfielder

Senior career*
Years	Team	Apps	(Gls)
1993–1995	Moscardó	28	(3)
1995–1997	Real Madrid C	51	(0)
1996–1997	→ Leganés (loan)	7	(0)
1997–1998	Málaga	19	(0)
1998–1999	Badajoz	25	(1)
1999–2000	San Lorenzo	3	(0)
2000	→ Dundee (loan)	9	(1)
2000–2002	Dundee	56	(3)
Total		198	(8)
- * Club domestic league appearances and goals

Javier Artero López (born 16 April 1975) is a Spanish former professional footballer who played as a midfielder.

After playing for five teams in the lower leagues of his country he joined Dundee in Scotland, spending two years with the club before being forced to retire at only 27, due to illness.

== Career ==
=== Early career ===
Born in Madrid, Artero started playing football with local amateurs Moscardó. In 1995 he signed with Real Madrid, but never made it past the C team, also being loaned to another club in the community, Leganés of Segunda División, and appearing very rarely over the course of his only season.

Subsequently, Artero dropped down to Segunda División B and joined Málaga, helping the Andalusians to return to the second tier after which he signed for another side in that league, Badajoz. He scored his only goal as a professional in his country on 29 November 1998, the only in an away win against Albacete.

=== Dundee ===
In 1999, Artero moved abroad to San Lorenzo from Argentina. From March–May of the following year he was loaned to Dundee of the Scottish Premier League, with the deal being made permanent on 1 July for £300,000, a club record. On the 30th, he scored in a 2–0 away victory over Motherwell.

Artero contributed one goal to a 5–0 home defeat of St Mirren on 18 November 2000. He enjoyed his best years as a professional with the Dark Blues, appearing in 75 competitive games with the side and helping them to the sixth place in his first year, with the subsequent qualification for the UEFA Intertoto Cup.

On 1 August 2001, the 26-year-old Artero was admitted to hospital with an unknown disease, which was revealed to be multiple sclerosis early into the following month. Even though he was still able to take part in some matches in the 2001–02 season, he was forced to retire from football in August 2002, being immediately named Dundee's international scout.

Artero worked as a football analyst after retiring, being a co-commentator on Real Madrid TV.
