= Antonio Patrizi =

Italian Roman Catholic priest

Blessed Antonio Patrizi O.S.A.
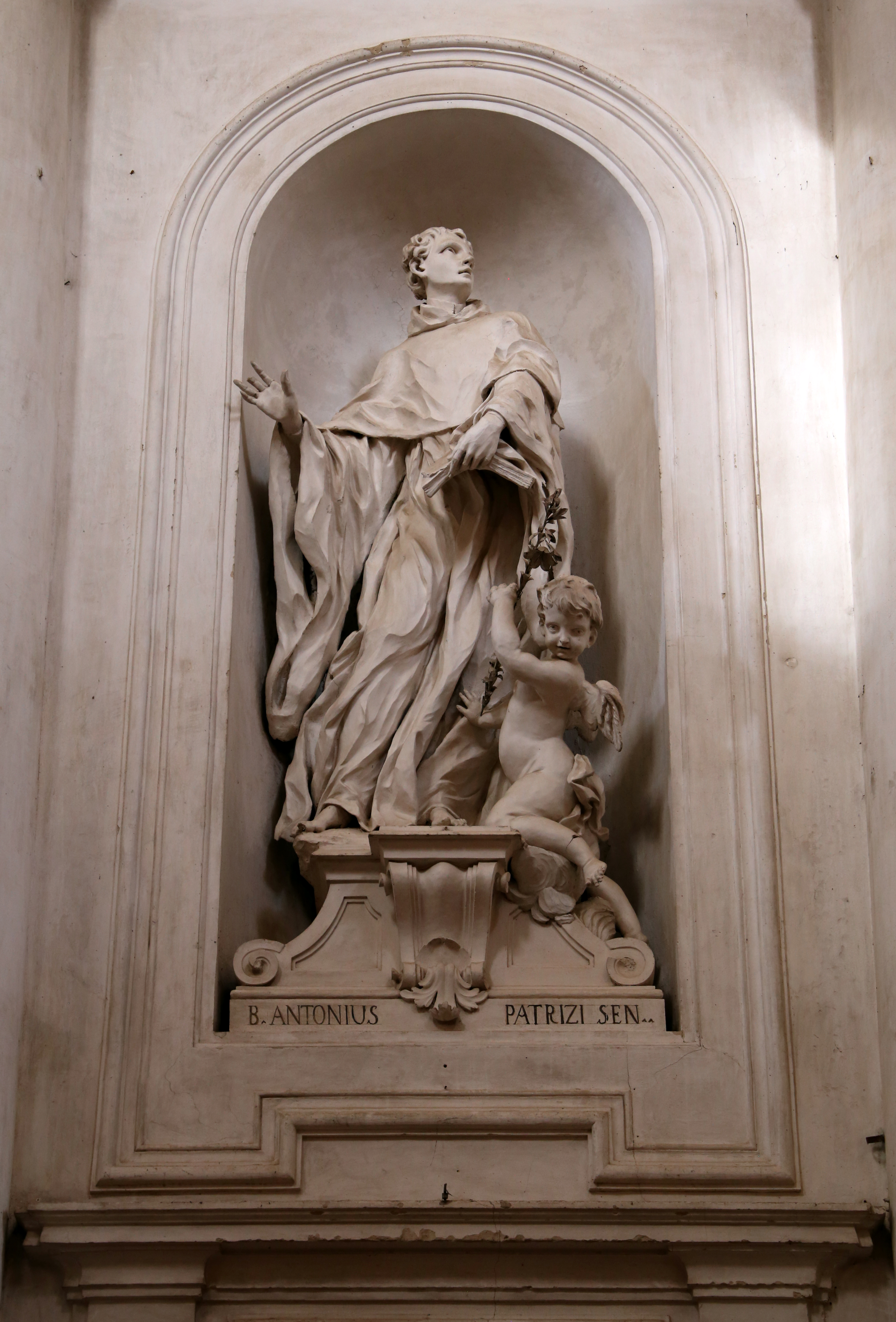

Priest
- Born: 17 January 1280; Siena, Republic of Siena
- Died: 23 April 1311 (aged 31); Monticiano, Republic of Siena
- Venerated in: Roman Catholic Church
- Beatified: 1 March 1804, Saint Peter's Basilica, Papal States by Pope Pius VII
- Feast: 28 March; 9 October (Augustinians)
- Attributes: Augustinian habit

Antonio Patrizi (17 January 1280 - 23 April 1311) was an Italian Roman Catholic priest and a professed member of the Order of Saint Augustine. Patrizi joined the order in Lecceto and lived as a hermit prior to his sudden death while visiting his friend at another convent.

Patrizi was beatified on 1 March 1804 after Pope Pius VII confirmed the late priest's longstanding 'cultus' - or popular and enduring devotion.

== Life ==
Antonio Patrizi was born in Siena at the beginning of 1280 as the son of Pietro and Ginerva Patrizi into the prominent house of Patrizi with its origins from Rome.

In 1287 he was entrusted to the Order of Preachers for his studies. On one particular Christmas Eve night in the Basilica di San Domenico he was inspired to visit on Christmas the hospital of Santa Maria della Scala where he met Pietro de' Piccolomini who suggested that the two both go to enroll in the Order of Saint Augustine at Lecceto; the two left on 26 December and were admitted into the novitiate. He was appointed at one point as the prior of his Lecceto convent.

Patrizi died sometime just after midnight on 23 April 1311 at the convent of Monticiano where he was spending the night while on a visit to his Florentine friend Pietro da Collegonzi. On the night he died an old and ill couple who lived next to the convent looked out the window to see a brilliant light pointing to the heavens and so believed it was a fire but then thought a pious man touching the heavens resided there. The couple was healed of their illnesses and went to the convent in the hopes of meeting this pious man - the friars went to Patrizi's cell but found him dead.

His remains were interred in a grave where it was said to have caused lilies to grow during the wintertime. His incorrupt remains were later transferred to the local church of Santi Pietro e Paolo - later renamed in his honor - and were transferred on two more occasions in 1616 and 1700.

== Beatification ==
Patrizi received formal beatification from Pope Pius VII on 1 March 1804 after the latter ratified the late priest's local 'cultus' - or popular devotion - that had endured since the late priest's death.
