= 1997–98 Scottish First Division =

Scottish First Division
- Season: 1997–98
- Champions: Dundee
- Promoted: Dundee
- Relegated: Partick Thistle; Stirling Albion
- Top goalscorer: James Grady (15)
- Biggest home win: Ayr United 6-0 Airdrieonians, 22.11.1997
- Biggest away win: Stirling Albion 0-6 Falkirk, 03.01.1998

The 1997–98 Scottish First Division was won by Dundee who were promoted 5 points ahead of runner up Falkirk.

== Promotion and relegation from 1996–97 ==
Promoted from First Division to Premier Division

- St Johnstone

Relegated from Premier Division to First Division

- Raith Rovers

Promoted from Second Division to First Division

- Ayr United
- Hamilton Academical

Relegated from First Division to Second Division

- Clydebank
- East Fife

== League table ==
Pos	Team	Pld	W	D	L	GF	GA	GD	Pts	Promotion or relegation
1	Dundee (C, P)	36	20	10	6	52	24	+28	70	Promotion to the Premier League
2	Falkirk	36	19	8	9	56	41	+15	65	
3	Raith Rovers	36	17	9	10	51	33	+18	60	
4	Airdrieonians	36	16	12	8	42	35	+7	60	
5	Greenock Morton	36	12	10	14	40	47	−7	46	
6	St Mirren	36	11	8	17	41	53	−12	41	
7	Ayr United	36	10	10	16	40	56	−16	40	
8	Hamilton Academical	36	9	11	16	43	56	−13	38	
9	Partick Thistle (R)	36	8	12	16	45	55	−10	36	Relegation to the Second Division
10	Stirling Albion (R)	36	8	10	18	40	56	−16	34	Relegation to the Second Division

Source: RSSSF
Rules for classification: 1) points; 2) goal difference; 3) number of goals scored.
(C) Champions; (P) Promoted; (R) Relegated

== Top scorers ==
P	Name	Goals
1	(Scotland) James Grady (Dundee)	15
2	(Scotland) Alex Bone (Stirling Albion)	13
3	(Scotland) Eddie Annand (Dundee)	12
=	(Scotland) Brian McPhee (Airdrieonians)	12
=	(England) David Moss (Falkirk)	12
6	(England) Stephen Cooper (Airdrieonians)	11
7	(Benin) Laurent D'Jaffo (Ayr United)	10
=	(Scotland) Paul Hartley (Raith Rovers)	10
=	(England) Warren Hawke (Morton)	10
=	(Scotland) Marino Keith (Falkirk)	10

== See also ==
- 1997–98 in Scottish football
