= Dariusz Adamczuk =

Polish footballer (born 1969)

Personal information
- Full name: Dariusz Adamczuk
- Date of birth: 21 October 1969 (age 57)
- Place of birth: Szczecin, Polish People’s Republic
- Height: 1.80 m (5 ft 11 in)
- Positions: Defender; midfielder

Senior career*
Years	Team	Apps	(Gls)
1987–1992	Pogoń Szczecin		
1992–1993	Eintracht Frankfurt	5	(0)
1993–1994	Dundee	11	(1)
1993–1994	Udinese	2	(0)
1994–1995	Belenenses	5	(0)
1995	Pogoń Szczecin	6	(0)
1996–1999	Dundee	103	(8)
1999–2002	Rangers	13	(0)
2001	→ Wigan Athletic (loan)	3	(0)
2006	Pogoń Szczecin Nowa		
2010	Pogoń Szczecin II		
2012–2016	Mewa Resko		

International career
	Poland U16	2	(0)
- Poland U18
- Poland Olympic
1992–1999	Poland	11	(1)
Medal record
Men's football
Representing Poland
Olympic Games
Silver medal – second place	1992 Barcelona	Team
- * Club domestic league appearances and goals

Dariusz Adamczuk (born 21 October 1969) is a Polish football executive and former professional footballer. He was most recently a board representative of Ekstraklasa club Widzew Łódź.

== Club career ==
Adamczuk started his career with Pogoń Szczecin during the 1987–88 season, before moving on to play for Eintracht Frankfurt, Dundee, Udinese Calcio and Belenenses.

It was in the 1999–2000 season that he would get his big break, signing on a free transfer for Scottish champions Rangers from Dundee. He started off as a regular in the Rangers team, making 16 appearances up to and including a UEFA Cup tie against Borussia Dortmund on 7 December 1999, but didn't make any further appearances that season. The following season, he made three appearances in the league across October and November 2000, however these would be his last appearances for Rangers. He had a loan spell at English club Wigan Athletic in 2001. In 2002 it was reported that he was suffering from depression. Adamczuk retired in 2002, then returned in 2006 to play for Pogoń Szczecin Nowa.

== International career ==
Adamczuk was a member of the Poland team that won the silver medal at the 1992 Summer Olympics in Barcelona.

In eleven matches for Poland, his solitary goal was against England in 1993 during a World Cup qualifier at the Stadion Śląski in Chorzów.

== Honours ==
Rangers

- Scottish Premier League: 1999–2000
- Scottish Cup: 1999–2000, 2001–02

Poland Olympic

- Olympic silver medal: 1992
