= Steve McCormick (footballer) =

Scottish footballer

Personal information
- Full name: Stephen McCormick
- Date of birth: 14 August 1969 (age 57)
- Place of birth: Dumbarton, Scotland
- Position: Forward

Youth career
- Yoker Athletic

Senior career*
Years	Team	Apps	(Gls)
1991–1995	Queen's Park	122	(37)
1995–1997	Stirling Albion	72	(33)
1997–1998	Dundee	15	(5)
1998	Leyton Orient	4	(0)
1998	Greenock Morton	5	(1)
1998–2000	Airdrieonians	33	(6)
2000	East Fife	11	(3)
2000–2001	Clydebank	3	(0)
2000–2001	Dumbarton	3	(0)
Total		268	(85)
- * Club domestic league appearances and goals

Steve McCormick (born 14 August 1969) is a Scottish former footballer, who played for Queen's Park, Stirling Albion, Dundee, Leyton Orient, Greenock Morton, Airdrieonians, East Fife, Clydebank and Dumbarton.

He was voted Scottish PFA Second Division Player of the Year and won the Daily Record Golden Shot award (first player to reach 30 goals in the SFL) in 1995–96. McCormick's prolific goalscoring exploits in the 1995-96 season led to speculation about a sensational call up to the Scotland international squad for Euro 96.
