= Lee Maddison =

English footballer

Personal information
- Full name: Lee Robert Maddison
- Date of birth: 5 October 1972 (age 54)
- Place of birth: Bristol, England
- Position: Defender

Youth career
- Avon Athletic
- ????–1991: Bristol Rovers

Senior career*
Years	Team	Apps	(Gls)
1991–1995	Bristol Rovers	73	(0)
1993	→ Bath City (loan)	4	(0)
1995–1997	Northampton Town	55	(0)
1997–2001	Dundee	67	(1)
2000–2001	→ Carlisle United (loan)	12	(0)
2001–2003	Carlisle United	52	(1)
2002	→ Oxford United (loan)	11	(0)
2003–2006	Gretna	31	(1)
Total		302	(3)
- * Club domestic league appearances and goals

Lee Robert Maddison (born 5 October 1972) is an English former professional footballer, who played in The Football League, Scottish Football League and the Scottish Premier League.

Maddison, who was born in Bristol, started playing football for his local junior team, Avon Athletic, before joining Bristol Rovers as a trainee. In July 1991 he was awarded his first professional contract, and his senior debut came on 11 January 1992 in a game against Tranmere Rovers. While with The Pirates he had a brief spell on loan with their landlords, Bath City, early in 1993 and he made four appearances for them in the Football Conference. In all he played 73 times for Bristol Rovers in the League without scoring a goal, and he moved on to Northampton Town in 1995.

In a two-year spell with The Cobblers Maddison played 52 League games, again without scoring, before heading north to join Scottish Football League team Dundee. The following year Dundee became founder members of the newly formed Scottish Premier League. He was loaned out to Carlisle United in 2000, and after playing 12 times in the League, the deal was made permanent late in January 2001. He played a further 52 games for the Cumbrian club, and after a loan spell with Oxford United in 2002 he returned to Scottish football with Gretna in 2003.

In 2004, he was diagnosed with non-Hodgkin lymphoma, and although he played a small number of games after this, it effectively ended his footballing career.

He is now married to Martine Maddison (formerly Saint).

== Honours ==
Carlisle United

- Football League Trophy runner-up: 2002–03
