= Ivano Bonetti =

Italian footballer (born 1964)

Personal information
- Date of birth: 1 August 1964 (age 62)
- Place of birth: Brescia, Italy
- Height: 1.76 m (5 ft 9 in)
- Position: Left midfielder

Senior career*
Years	Team	Apps	(Gls)
1981–1984	Brescia	70	(3)
1984–1985	Genoa	31	(1)
1985–1987	Juventus	18	(2)
1987–1988	Atalanta	26	(2)
1988–1990	Bologna	62	(3)
1990–1993	Sampdoria	61	(0)
1993–1994	Bologna	18	(2)
1994	Torino	5	(0)
1995	Brescia	16	(0)
1995–1996	Grimsby Town	19	(3)
1996	Tranmere Rovers	13	(2)
1997	Crystal Palace	2	(0)
1997–1999	Genoa	55	(1)
1999–2000	Sestrese	19	(0)
2000–2002	Dundee	18	(2)
Total		433	(20)

Managerial career
- 2000–2002: Dundee
- * Club domestic league appearances and goals

Ivano Bonetti (born 1 August 1964) is an Italian professional football manager, executive and former player.

As a player, he was a midfielder from 1981 to 2002. He made appearances for several clubs in Italy in both Serie A and Serie B most notably Juventus, Sampdoria, Bologna and Brescia. He became notably remembered in England for his spell at Grimsby Town, where, despite being a fan favourite, he was involved in an infamous bust-up with his manager that left him with a broken cheekbone. He also turned out in his home country for Genoa, Atalanta, Torino and Sestrese as well as spells in England with Tranmere Rovers and Crystal Palace. In 2000, he was appointed player-manager of Scottish Premier League side Dundee, where he remained for two years, before being appointed director of football of Lega Pro Prima Divisione club Valle del Giovenco where he remained until 2010.

== Playing career ==
=== Italy ===
Born in Brescia, Bonetti made his debut for his hometown club, Brescia (1981–84), before moving to Serie B side Genoa (1984–85), and subsequently defending European Champions Juventus (1985–88), where he won the 1985 Intercontinental Cup, and the 1985–86 Serie A title; he made his Serie A debut on 10 November 1985, coming on as a late substitute in a 3–1 home win over Roma, the club for which his brother Dario was playing at the time. During Ivano's time at the Turin club, he was also sent on loan to Atalanta for the 1987–88 Serie B season, helping the club to obtain a fourth-place finish and Serie A promotion. He later played for Bologna (1988–90), and Sampdoria (1990–93), where he won his second Serie A title in 1991, also reaching the European Cup final the following year, playing alongside his brother Dario once again. He later returned to Bologna (1993–94) in Serie C1, before briefly returning to Brescia the following season (1994–95), and spending the second half of the 1994–95 Serie A season with Torino, before moving to England later in 1995.

=== Grimsby Town ===
==== Initial impact ====
When Bonetti signed for Grimsby Town in 1995, it brought massive national attention to the club, and he became an instant fans' favourite. The loyalty of the fans was tested when it was announced that £100,000 was needed to hire Bonetti from the American management company that held the rights to his "services and image"; this was raised by £50,000 from the fans and £50,000 from Bonetti himself, further increasing his appeal. Grimsby, under FIFA regulations, was not allowed to deal with the company and probably could not have afforded the money anyway.

The love affair was completed when he scored the winning goal against West Brom, then managed by former Grimsby boss Alan Buckley and featuring several former Grimsby players.

==== The "plate of chicken" incident ====
On 10 February 1996, an incident after a 3–2 defeat away to Luton Town led to the departure of Bonetti from Blundell Park. Just a month before, Grimsby had beaten them 7–1 in the FA Cup third round. Apparently Brian Laws, angry after the defeat, threw a plate of chicken wings at Bonetti, who he felt did not try hard enough, leaving him with a fractured cheekbone. At the end of the season, Bonetti left for Tranmere Rovers on a free transfer; Laws lasted until November of the next season. At Tranmere, Bonetti scored twice, including a late winner in a 4–3 win over Portsmouth. At the start of the 1997–98 season, Bonetti turned up at Crystal Palace, making two substitute appearances in the Premier League, shortly before returning to Italy to join Genoa.

==== Legacy ====
In 1998, a consortium looking to take over Grimsby Town was planning to install Bonetti as manager, though this later fell through.

== Coaching career ==
Ivano, along with brother Dario, enjoyed a stint as a coach, serving as a player-manager of the Scottish club Dundee, replacing Jocky Scott. During his first season at Dundee, he signed in several foreign players such as Fabián Caballero, Georgi Nemsadze and, most notably, Argentine superstar Claudio Caniggia, the latter being signed by Rangers only one year later, following an impressive season with the club. Despite this, he made only a sixth place in his first season, but was, however, publicly backed by the club. Further top signings such as Temuri Ketsbaia, Zurab Khizanishvili and Fan Zhiyi failed to make an improvement to the team results, and Dundee ended the 2001–02 season in a disappointing ninth place. He was sacked on 2 July 2002 by the club management. A few months later he claimed back £800,000 from Dundee, declaring he had loaned the money to his former club in order to perform the signing of Fabián Caballero.

Between 2004 and 2010, he had a spell as director of football of Lega Pro Prima Divisione club Valle del Giovenco.

In August 2020, Bonetti joined Serie D club Rimini as head youth coach.

== Personal life ==
Bonetti is married and has three children. He is the son of Aldo Bonetti who played for Brescia until the Second World War. His brother Mario played for Atalanta, and his brother Dario played over 100 games for Roma and won two caps for Italy.

=== Media and business interests ===
Bonetti became an entrepreneur in 2013. He is the founder, CEO and president of Mobisafe, a company that deals with technology applied to health. He sells a product that, when applied to mobile phones, can reduce electromagnetic waves, the Skudowave. The medical device has been sold in pharmacies and distribution of the Skudowave to several football clubs, among others Bayern Munich, Juventus and Manchester United.

== Managerial statistics ==
As of match played 12 May 2002

Managerial record by team and tenure
Team	From	To	Record				
Team	From	To	P	W	D	L	Win %
Dundee	29 July 2000	12 May 2002	90	29	21	40	32.2
Total			90	29	21	40	32.2

== Honours ==
Juventus

- Serie A: 1985–86
- Intercontinental Cup: 1985

Sampdoria

- Serie A: 1990–91
