= Eddie Annand =

Scottish footballer (born 1973)

Personal information
- Date of birth: 24 March 1973 (age 53)
- Place of birth: Glasgow, Scotland
- Position: Striker

Senior career*
Years	Team	Apps	(Gls)
1991–1992	Partick Thistle	1	(0)
1992–1995	Sligo Rovers	61	(30)
1995–1997	Clyde	64	(42)
1997–2000	Dundee	93	(27)
2000–2003	Ayr United	78	(35)
2003	→ Morton (loan)	11	(5)
2003–2004	St Mirren	10	(0)
2004–2005	Dumbarton	28	(7)
2005	Raith Rovers	15	(2)
2006	Lochee United		
2006–2007	Bathgate Thistle		
2007–2008	Arthurlie		
Total		359	(148)
- * Club domestic league appearances and goals

Edward Annand (born 24 March 1973) is a Scottish retired footballer who last played as a striker for Arthurlie.

== Career ==
=== Early years ===
Annand began his career with Partick Thistle, where he played one game before securing a loan move to Sligo Rovers. the move was made permanent prior to the 1993–94 season. Annand scored the winning goal which sealed the 1993–94 League of Ireland First Division title and also the winner in the FAI Cup semi final. In the final he provided the corner kick which won the FAI Cup at Lansdowne Road in May 1994. This secured Sligo's qualification for the 1994–95 UEFA Cup Winners' Cup where, after beating Floriana F.C., Annand made two appearances against Club Brugge K.V.

In 1995 he returned to Scotland to play with Clyde where he enjoyed the best goalscoring form of his career, scoring 42 goals in 64 league matches. He then moved to Dundee in 1997, making nearly 100 league appearances and winning the Scottish First Division title. He moved to Ayr United in 2000 and spent three years with the Honest Men, which included scoring the only goal, a penalty in extra-time, in the 2002 Scottish League Cup semi-final against Hibs at Hampden.

including a short loan spell with Morton, Annand moved to St Mirren for a year's spell. In 2004, Annand moved to Dumbarton and part-time football, and spent the latter part of 2005 with Raith Rovers, where he finished his senior career. In January 2006, Annand moved into junior football with Lochee United but quickly moved to Bathgate Thistle. After a spell out of the game, Annand came out of retirement to join Arthurlie in November 2007 and retired the next year.

Off the pitch, Annand ran a car hire firm, set up during his time at Bathgate.

In August 2023, Annand revealed that he had been diagnosed with an incurable grade four astrocytoma, a form of brain tumour, and had undergone surgery to remove much of it.

== Honours ==
Sligo Rovers

- FAI Cup
  - 1993–94
- League of Ireland First Division
  - 1993–94
- League of Ireland First Division Shield

Dundee

- Scottish First Division
  - 1997–98
