= Archie Buchanan =

Scottish footballer, manager, and scout

Personal information
- Date of birth: 2 October 1928
- Place of birth: Edinburgh, Scotland
- Date of death: 12 December 1983 (aged 55)
- Position: Wing half

Youth career
- Edinburgh Thistle

Senior career*
Years	Team	Apps	(Gls)
1946–1956	Hibernian	203	(15)
1956–1958	St Mirren	43	(1)
1958–1960	Cowdenbeath	18	(0)
Total		264	(16)

Managerial career
- 1959–1960: Cowdenbeath
- * Club domestic league appearances and goals

Archie Buchanan (2 October 1928 – 12 December 1983) was a Scottish football wing half who played in the Scottish League for Hibernian, St Mirren and Cowdenbeath. He later managed Cowdenbeath and scouted for St Mirren.

== Career statistics ==
Appearances and goals by club, season and competition
Club	Season	League			National Cup		League Cup		Europe		Other		Total	
Club	Season	Division	Apps	Goals	Apps	Goals	Apps	Goals	Apps	Goals	Apps	Goals	Apps	Goals
Hibernian	1946–47	Scottish First Division	12	4	0	0	7	4	—		—		19	8
Hibernian	1947–48	Scottish First Division	29	1	5	0	5	0	—		—		39	1
Hibernian	1948–49	Scottish First Division	26	0	3	0	6	0	—		—		35	0
Hibernian	1949–50	Scottish First Division	24	2	1	0	8	0	—		—		33	2
Hibernian	1950–51	Scottish First Division	27	4	5	1	4	0	—		—		36	5
Hibernian	1951–52	Scottish First Division	25	2	3	0	5	0	—		4 (Note: Appearances in Saint Mungo Cup.)	0	37	2
Hibernian	1952–53	Scottish First Division	24	0	5	1	9	0	—		4 (Note: Appearances in Coronation Cup.)	0	42	1
Hibernian	1953–54	Scottish First Division	20	1	0	0	9	0	—		—		29	1
Hibernian	1954–55	Scottish First Division	3	0	0	0	6	0	—		—		9	0
Hibernian	1955–56	Scottish First Division	9	0	0	0	0	0	2 (Note: Appearances in European Cup.)	0	—		11	0
Hibernian	1956–57	Scottish First Division	4	1	0	0	0	0	—		—		4	1
Career total			203	15	22	2	59	4	2	0	8	0	294	21
