= Tommy Younger =

Scottish footballer (1930–1984)

Personal information
- Full name: Thomas Younger
- Date of birth: 10 April 1930
- Place of birth: Edinburgh, Scotland
- Date of death: 13 January 1984 (aged 53)
- Place of death: Edinburgh, Scotland
- Position: Goalkeeper

Youth career
- –: Hutchison Vale

Senior career*
Years	Team	Apps	(Gls)
1948–1956	Hibernian	181	(0)
1956–1959	Liverpool	120	(0)
1959–1960	Falkirk	6	(0)
1960	Stoke City	10	(0)
1960–1961	Rhyl		
1961	Toronto City	23	(0)
1961–1963	Leeds United	37	(0)
Total		377	(0)

International career
1955–1958	Scotland	24	(0)
1955	Scottish Football League XI	4	(0)
1958	SFA trial v SFL	1	(0)

Managerial career
- 1959–1960: Falkirk
- * Club domestic league appearances and goals

Thomas Younger (10 April 1930 – 13 January 1984) was a Scottish footballer who played as a goalkeeper for Hibernian, Liverpool, Falkirk, Leeds United, Stoke City and the Scotland national team.

== Career ==
Born in Edinburgh, Scotland, Younger signed for his hometown club Hibernian in 1948. He was part of the successful side of the early 50s, winning two titles in 1950–51 and 1951–52.

Liverpool manager Phil Taylor signed Younger in June 1956 for £9000. He made his debut at Anfield on 18 August 1956 in a league match against Huddersfield Town. Huddersfield spoilt Younger's day by taking both points from a 3–2 win. He kept his first clean-sheet two games later at Gigg Lane as the Reds beat Bury 2–0. Younger immediately took over the No.1 jersey at Anfield and played in 43 of Liverpool's 45 matches in his first season. Younger spent three years at Liverpool, only missing six matches during this time making a total of 127 appearances. In 1959, he was allowed to leave to take on a player/manager role in Scotland.

Younger joined Falkirk as player manager in 1959. A back injury led to his retirement as a player.

After finding out that the injury was not as bad as first diagnosed, he signed for Stoke City in 1960. Younger played ten league games for Stoke towards the end of the 1959–60 season. He endured a difficult time playing in a struggling side at the Victoria Ground. In his ten matches Stoke lost nine of them with Younger conceding 22 goals. He was released at the end of the season.

He played three matches for Welsh league side Rhyl before Leeds United manager Don Revie, who was bringing experienced players to cope with declining fortunes at the club, signed Younger in 1961. He made 42 appearances for Leeds in 13 months before retiring for a second (and final) time in October 1962. In 1961, he played in the Eastern Canada Professional Soccer League with Toronto City.

== International career ==
Younger was capped by Scotland 24 times, in an unbroken sequence spanning three years. He made his debut on 4 May 1955 in a friendly international against Portugal at Hampden Park, Glasgow. The Scots were too strong for their Iberian counterparts, winning the game 3–0 and thus gaining Younger his first clean-sheet at national level. Younger also had the honour of keeping goal for the Scottish side during the 1958 World Cup in Sweden. His appearance at the finals against Paraguay was also his last appearance for the national side.

== After playing ==
After his retirement he stayed on at Leeds as a scout. He then took a coaching role in Canada at Toronto City.

After his stint in Toronto he returned to Hibs as this time as director. Younger became vice president of the Scottish Football Association to Willie Harkness taking over as president after Harkness retired from that in May 1983. Younger held the position until his death eight months later on 13 January 1984, aged 53. He was survived by his wife, Mary, three daughters and a son.

== Career statistics ==
=== Club ===
Appearances and goals by club, season and competition
Club	Season	League			FA Cup		League Cup		Other		Total	
Club	Season	Division	Apps	Goals	Apps	Goals	Apps	Goals	Apps	Goals	Apps	Goals
Hibernian	1948–49	Scottish First Division	4	0	0	0	0	0	—		4	0
Hibernian	1949–50	Scottish First Division	29	0	1	0	9	0	—		39	0
Hibernian	1950–51	Scottish First Division	29	0	5	0	11	0	—		45	0
Hibernian	1951–52	Scottish First Division	24	0	3	0	0	0	—		27	0
Hibernian	1952–53	Scottish First Division	27	0	5	0	7	0	4	0	43	0
Hibernian	1953–54	Scottish First Division	11	0	0	0	9	0	—		20	0
Hibernian	1954–55	Scottish First Division	24	0	0	0	6	0	—		30	0
Hibernian	1955–56	Scottish First Division	33	0	2	0	6	0	5	0	41	0
Hibernian	Total		181	0	16	0	48	0	9	0	254	0
Liverpool	1956–57	Second Division	40	0	1	0	0	0	—		41	0
Liverpool	1957–58	Second Division	39	0	5	0	0	0	—		44	0
Liverpool	1958–59	Second Division	41	0	1	0	0	0	—		42	0
Liverpool	Total		120	0	7	0	0	0	—		127	0
Falkirk	1959–60	Scottish Second Division	6	0	0	0	0	0	—		6	0
Stoke City	1959–60	Second Division	10	0	0	0	0	0	—		10	0
Leeds United	1961–62	Second Division	31	0	2	0	3	0	—		36	0
Leeds United	1962–63	Second Division	6	0	0	0	0	0	—		6	0
Leeds United	Total		37	0	2	0	3	0	—		42	0
Career Total			354	0	25	0	51	0	9	0	439	0

=== International ===
National team	Year	Apps	Goals
Scotland	1955	6	0
Scotland	1956	5	0
Scotland	1957	8	0
Scotland	1958	5	0
Total		24	0

== See also ==
- List of Scotland national football team captains
