= 1951–52 Heart of Midlothian F.C. season =

Heart of Midlothian
1951–52 season
- Manager: Tommy Walker
- Stadium: Tynecastle Park
- Scottish First Division: 4th
- Scottish Cup: Semi-finalists
- League Cup: Group Stage
- St Mungo Cup: Round 1

During the 1951–52 season Hearts competed in the Scottish First Division, the Scottish Cup, the Scottish League Cup, the St Mungo Cup and the East of Scotland Shield.

== Fixtures ==
=== Friendlies ===
1 October 1951 Friendly	Selkirk	1–10	Hearts	Tynecastle Park
	Goal

23 April 1952 Stamford Bridge Trophy	Chelsea	3–2	Hearts	Stamford Bridge
	Goal

7 May 1952 Friendly	Burntisland Shipyard	2–12	Hearts	Shipyard Recreation Ground
	Goal

=== Penman Cup ===
5 May 1952 Round 2	Hearts	4–2	East Fife	Tynecastle Park

12 May 1952 Semi-Final	Hearts	1–1	Raith Rovers	Tynecastle Park

14 May 1952 Semi-Final Replay	Raith Rovers	0–2	Hearts	Stark's Park

=== St Mungo Cup ===
14 July 1951 St Mungo Cup R1	Celtic	2–1	Hearts	Celtic Park
				Attendance: 51,000

=== League Cup ===
11 August 1951 League Cup Group	Hearts	1–0	Raith Rovers	Tynecastle Park
				Attendance: 27,400

15 August 1951 League Cup Group	Dundee	2–1	Hearts	Dens Park
				Attendance: 22,500

18 August 1951 League Cup Group	St Mirren	5–5	Hearts	St Mirren Park, Love Street
				Attendance: 8,000

25 August 1951 League Cup Group	Raith Rovers	2–0	Hearts	Stark's Park
				Attendance: 14,000

29 August 1951 League Cup Group	Hearts	5–2	Dundee	Tynecastle Park
				Attendance: 27,492

1 September 1951 League Cup Group	Hearts	3–1	St Mirren	Tynecastle Park
				Attendance: 32,488

=== Scottish Cup ===
9 February 1952 Scottish Cup R2	Hearts	1–0	Raith Rovers	Tynecastle Park
				Attendance: 41,152

23 February 1952 Scottish Cup R3	Queen of the South	1–3	Hearts	Palmerston Park
				Attendance: 26,552

8 March 1952 Scottish Cup R4	Airdrieonians	2–2	Hearts	Broomfield Park
				Attendance: 26,000

12 March 1952 Scottish Cup R4 Replay	Hearts	6–4	Airdrieonians	Tynecastle Park
				Attendance: 40,528

29 March 1952 Scottish Cup SF	Hearts	1–1	Motherwell	Hampden Park
				Attendance: 98,208

7 April 1952 Scottish Cup SF Replay	Hearts	1–1	Motherwell	Hampden Park
				Attendance: 80,141

9 April 1952 Scottish Cup SF 2nd Replay	Hearts	1–3	Motherwell	Hampden Park
				Attendance: 60,290

=== Scottish First Division ===
8 September 1951 Scottish First Division	Hearts	3–1	East Fife	Tynecastle Park
				Attendance: 24,447

15 September 1951 Scottish First Division	Airdrieonians	2–0	Hearts	Broomfield Park
				Attendance: 12,000

22 September 1951 Scottish First Division	Hearts	1–1	Hibernian	Tynecastle Park
				Attendance: 44,842

29 September 1951 Scottish First Division	Celtic	1–3	Hearts	Celtic Park
				Attendance: 48,000

6 October 1951 Scottish First Division	Hearts	4–2	Dundee	Tynecastle Park
				Attendance: 28,522

13 October 1951 Scottish First Division	St Mirren	1–0	Hearts	St Mirren Park, Love Street
				Attendance: 15,000

20 October 1951 Scottish First Division	Rangers	2–0	Hearts	Ibrox Park
				Attendance: 35,000

27 October 1951 Scottish First Division	Hearts	2–2	Third Lanark	Tynecastle Park
				Attendance: 19,481

3 November 1951 Scottish First Division	Partick Thistle	2–0	Hearts	Firhill Park
				Attendance: 22,000

10 November 1951 Scottish First Division	Hearts	4–3	Queen of the South	Tynecastle Park
				Attendance: 14,154

17 November 1951 Scottish First Division	Motherwell	0–5	Hearts	Fir Park
				Attendance: 14,000

24 November 1951 Scottish First Division	Hearts	4–1	Morton	Tynecastle Park
				Attendance: 23,225

1 December 1951 Scottish First Division	Hearts	2–2	Aberdeen	Tynecastle Park
				Attendance: 28,655

8 December 1951 Scottish First Division	Stirling Albion	0–4	Hearts	Annfield
				Attendance: 8,000

15 December 1951 Scottish First Division	Hearts	4–2	Raith Rovers	Tynecastle Park
				Attendance: 26,545

22 December 1951 Scottish First Division	East Fife	2–4	Hearts	Bayview Park
				Attendance: 15,000

29 December 1951 Scottish First Division	Hearts	6–1	Airdrieonians	Tynecastle Park
				Attendance: 24,389

1 January 1952 Scottish First Division	Hibernian	2–3	Hearts	Easter Road
				Attendance: 39,000

2 January 1952 Scottish First Division	Hearts	2–1	Celtic	Tynecastle Park
				Attendance: 37,197

5 January 1952 Scottish First Division	Dundee	3–3	Hearts	Dens Park
				Attendance: 32,000

12 January 1952 Scottish First Division	Hearts	2–1	St Mirren	Tynecastle Park
				Attendance: 26,724

19 January 1952 Scottish First Division	Hearts	2–2	Rangers	Tynecastle Park
				Attendance: 47,684

26 January 1952 Scottish First Division	Aberdeen	3–0	Hearts	Pittodrie Park
				Attendance: 16,000

13 February 1952 Scottish First Division	Hearts	1–2	Partick Thistle	Tynecastle Park
				Attendance: 10,901

16 February 1952 Scottish First Division	Queen of the South	1–1	Hearts	Palmerston Park
				Attendance: 12,500

1 March 1952 Scottish First Division	Morton	3–1	Hearts	Cappielow Park
				Attendance: 8,900

15 March 1952 Scottish First Division	Hearts	5–2	Stirling Albion	Tynecastle Park
				Attendance: 13,828

22 March 1952 Scottish First Division	Raith Rovers	2–1	Hearts	Stark's Park
				Attendance: 10,000

14 April 1952 Scottish First Division	Third Lanark	4–0	Hearts	Cathkin Park
				Attendance: 4,000

30 April 1952 Scottish First Division	Hearts	4–2	Motherwel	Tynecastle Park
				Attendance: 7,666

== See also ==
- List of Heart of Midlothian F.C. seasons
