= 1952–53 Celtic F.C. season =

Celtic
1952–53 season
- Manager: Jimmy McGrory
- Stadium: Celtic Park
- Scottish Division A: 8th
- Scottish Cup: Fourth round
- Scottish League Cup: Group stage
- Coronation Cup: Winners

During the 1952–53 Scottish football season, Celtic competed in Scottish Division A.

== Competitions ==
=== Scottish Division A ===
==== League table ====
Pos	Team	Pld	W	D	L	GF	GA	GR	Pts
6	St Mirren	30	11	8	11	52	58	0.897	30
7	Dundee	30	9	11	10	44	37	1.189	29
8	Celtic	30	11	7	12	51	54	0.944	29
9	Partick Thistle	30	10	9	11	55	63	0.873	29
10	Queen of the South	30	10	8	12	43	61	0.705	28

Source: RSSSF

==== Matches ====
6 September 1952 Division A	Celtic	5–3	Falkirk	Glasgow
15:00 GMT				Stadium: Celtic Park; Attendance: 20,000

13 September 1952 Division A	Raith Rovers	1–1	Celtic	Kirkcaldy
15:00				Stadium: Stark's Park; Attendance: 18,000

20 September 1952 Division A	Celtic	2–1	Rangers	Glasgow
15:00				Stadium: Celtic Park; Attendance: 48,000

27 September 1952 Division A	Aberdeen	2–2	Celtic	Aberdeen
15:00 GMT				Stadium: Pittodrie Park; Attendance: 27,000

4 October 1952 Division A	Celtic	3–0	Motherwell	Glasgow
14:45 BST				Stadium: Celtic Park; Attendance: 30,000

11 October 1952 Division A	Clyde	1–2	Celtic	Glasgow
15:00 BST				Stadium: Shawfield Stadium; Attendance: 31,000

18 October 1952 Division A	Celtic	1–1	Queen of the South	Glasgow
15:00 BST				Stadium: Celtic Park; Attendance: 24,000

25 October 1952 Division A	Hearts	1–0	Celtic	Edinburgh
14:45 BST				Stadium: Tynecastle Park; Attendance: 33,260

1 November 1952 Division A	St Mirren	1–2	Celtic	Paisley
15:00 GMT				Stadium: St Mirren Park, Love Street; Attendance: 36,000

8 November 1952 Division A	Celtic	5–4	Third Lanark	Glasgow
14:30 GMT				Stadium: Celtic Park; Attendance: 30,000

15 November 1952 Division A	Partick Thistle	3–0	Celtic	Glasgow
15:00 GMT				Stadium: Firhill Park; Attendance: 38,453

22 November 1952 Division A	Airdrieonians	0–0	Celtic	Airdrie
15:00 GMT				Stadium: Broomfield Park; Attendance: 18,000

6 December 1952 Division A	Hibernian	1–1	Celtic	Edinburgh
14:15 GMT				Stadium: Easter Road; Attendance: 32,500

13 December 1952 Division A	Celtic	5–0	Dundee	Glasgow
14:15 GMT				Stadium: Celtic Park; Attendance: 25,000

20 December 1952 Division A	Falkirk	2–3	Celtic	Falkirk
15:00 GMT				Stadium: Brockville Park; Attendance: 14,000

27 December 1952 Division A	Celtic	0–1	Raith Rovers	Glasgow
14:15 GMT				Stadium: Celtic Park; Attendance: 25,000

1 January 1953 Division A	Rangers	1–0	Celtic	Glasgow
14:00 GMT				Stadium: Ibrox Park; Attendance: 73,000

10 January 1953 Division A	Motherwell	4–2	Celtic	Motherwell
15:00 GMT				Stadium: Fir Park; Attendance: 20,300

17 January 1953 Division A	Celtic	2–4	Clyde	Glasgow
15:00 GMT				Stadium: Celtic Park; Attendance: 20,000

31 January 1953 Division A	Queen of the South	2–1	Celtic	Dumfries
15:00 GMT				Stadium: Palmerston Park; Attendance: 12,800

14 February 1953 Division A	Celtic	1–1	Hearts	Glasgow
15:00 GMT				Stadium: Celtic Park; Attendance: 35,000

28 February 1953 Division A	Third Lanark	1–3	Celtic	Glasgow
15:00 GMT				Stadium: Cathkin Park; Attendance: 40,000

7 March 1953 Division A	Celtic	3–1	Partick Thistle	Glasgow
15:00 GMT				Stadium: Celtic Park; Attendance: 35,000

18 March 1953 Division A	Celtic	0–1	Airdrieonians	Glasgow
15:00 GMT				Stadium: Celtic Park; Attendance: 10,000

21 March 1953 Division A	East Fife	4–1	Celtic	Methil
15:00 GMT				Stadium: Bayview Park; Attendance: 16,000

28 March 1953 Division A	Celtic	1–3	Hibernian	Glasgow
15:00 GMT				Stadium: Celtic Park; Attendance: 20,000

4 April 1953 Division A	Dundee	4–0	Celtic	Dundee
15:00 BST				Stadium: Dens Park; Attendance: 28,000

11 April 1953 Division A	Celtic	3–2	St Mirren	Glasgow
15:00 BST				Stadium: Celtic Park; Attendance: 10,000

15 April 1953 Division A	Celtic	1–3	Aberdeen	Glasgow
15:00 BST				Stadium: Celtic Park; Attendance: 10,000

18 April 1953 Division A	Celtic	1–1	East Fife	Glasgow
15:00 BST				Stadium: Celtic Park; Attendance: 17,000

=== Scottish Cup ===
24 January 1953 First round	Eyemouth United	0–4	Celtic	Eyemouth
15:00 GMT				Stadium: Houndlaw Park; Attendance: 4,131

7 February 1953 Second round	Stirling Albion	1–1	Celtic	Stirling
15:00 GMT				Stadium: Annfield; Attendance: 24,763

11 February 1953 Second round replay	Celtic	3–0	Stirling Albion	Glasgow
15:00 GMT				Stadium: Celtic Park; Attendance: 25,000

21 February 1953 Third round	Falkirk	2–3	Celtic	Falkirk
15:00 GMT				Stadium: Brockville Park; Attendance: 23,100

14 March 1953 Fourth round	Rangers	2–0	Celtic	Glasgow
15:00 GMT				Stadium: Ibrox Park; Attendance: 95,000

=== Scottish League Cup ===
9 August 1952 Group 8	St Mirren	0–1	Celtic	Paisley
15:00 GMT				Stadium: St Mirren Park, Love Street; Attendance: 25,000

13 August 1952 Group 8	Celtic	2–5	Partick Thistle	Glasgow
15:00 GMT				Stadium: Celtic Park; Attendance: 40,000

16 August 1952 Group 8	Celtic	1–0	Hibernian	Glasgow
15:00 GMT				Stadium: Celtic Park; Attendance: 49,000

23 August 1952 Group 8	Celtic	3–1	St Mirren	Glasgow
15:00 GMT				Stadium: Celtic Park; Attendance: 25,000

27 August 1952 Group 8	Partick Thistle	0–1	Celtic	Glasgow
18:45 GMT				Stadium: Firhill Park; Attendance: 30,000

30 August 1952 Group 8	Hibernian	3–0	Celtic	Edinburgh
15:00 GMT				Stadium: Easter Road; Attendance: 52,000

=== Coronation Cup ===
11 May 1953 First round	Celtic (Scotland)	1–0	(England) Arsenal	Glasgow
15:00 GMT				Stadium: Hampden Park; Attendance: 59,500

16 May 1953 Semi-final	Celtic (Scotland)	2–1	(England) Manchester United	Glasgow
15:00 GMT				Stadium: Hampden Park; Attendance: 73,000

20 May 1953 Final	Celtic (Scotland)	2–0	(Scotland) Hibernian	Glasgow
19:00 GMT				Stadium: Hampden Park; Attendance: 117,060
