= List of Hibernian F.C. managers =

Hibernian Football Club is a Scottish association football club based in Edinburgh. The club was founded in 1875, and played its first match on Christmas Day of that year. Hibernian have won the Scottish league championship four times, most recently in 1952. Three of those four championships were won between 1948 and 1952, when the club had the services of the Famous Five, a notable forward line. The club have won the Scottish Cup three times, in 1887, 1902, and 2016, with the latter victory ending a notorious hundred plus year drought. Hibs have also won the Scottish League Cup three times, in 1972, 1991, and 2007. Hibernian reached the semi-final of the first ever European Cup in 1955–56, becoming the first British side to participate in European competition

This chronological list comprises all those who have held the position of manager of the Hibernian first team. The club did not officially appoint a manager until 1903 because they did not incorporate until then. From 1875 until 1903, the club was run by a committee, although Dan McMichael was effectively the manager when the club won the 1901–02 Scottish Cup and the 1902–03 league championship. Phil Kelso took charge for season 1903–04, but left the club in April 1904 and was replaced by Dan McMichael.

As of September 2023, Hibernian have had 36 different full-time managers. McMichael is the longest-serving manager, having run the club for 17 years across two spells. Willie McCartney took charge of part of the league-winning side in 1947–48, but he died in office after a Scottish Cup match in January 1948. Hugh Shaw inherited that team, and went on to win three league championships in the late 1940s and early 1950s. Alan Stubbs won the Scottish Cup in 2015–16, ending a 114-year drought in that competition. Eddie Turnbull, Alex Miller and John Collins all won one Scottish League Cup each. Bobby Templeton, Bertie Auld, Alex McLeish and Neil Lennon all won second tier championships.

== Managers ==
As of the match played on 19 September 2026

Key Key to record:

- P = Matches played
- W = Matches won
- D = Matches drawn
- L = Matches lost
- Win % = Win ratio

| * | Caretaker manager |

| Name | Nationality | First game | Last game | P | W | D | L | %W | Honours | Manner of departure | Notes |
|---|---|---|---|---|---|---|---|---|---|---|---|
| Dan McMichael | Ireland | 17 August 1901 | 21 February 1903 | 50 | 29 | 11 | 10 | 58.00 | Scottish Cup (1901–02); Scottish league (1902–03) | Club incorporated (Note: The club incorporated in 1903 and appointed a manager for the first time. McMichael had previously worked as club secretary, first appointed by the club committee in 1900.) | |
| Phil Kelso | Scotland | 15 August 1903 | 30 April 1904 | 28 | 8 | 5 | 15 | 28.57 | | Moved to Woolwich Arsenal | |
| Dan McMichael | Ireland | 20 August 1904 | 1 February 1919 | 548 | 189 | 123 | 236 | 34.49 | | Died in office | |
| Davy Gordon | Scotland | 8 March 1919 | 27 April 1921 | 100 | 32 | 22 | 46 | 32.00 | | Resigned | |
| Alex Maley | Scotland | 20 August 1921 | 18 April 1925 | 177 | 81 | 46 | 50 | 45.76 | | | |
| Bobby Templeton | Scotland | 15 August 1925 | 8 February 1936 | 440 | 164 | 83 | 193 | 37.27 | | Resigned | |
| Johnny Halligan* | Scotland | 15 February 1936 | 25 April 1936 | 11 | 6 | 1 | 4 | 54.55 | | Caretaker | |
| Willie McCartney | Scotland | 8 August 1936 | 24 January 1948 | 484 | 240 | 92 | 152 | 49.59 | | Died in office | |
| Hugh Shaw | Scotland | 31 January 1948 | 4 November 1961 | 604 | 311 | 101 | 192 | 51.49 | Scottish league (1947–48, 1950–51, 1951–52) | Resigned | |
| Walter Galbraith | Scotland | 13 December 1961 | 7 March 1964 | 109 | 41 | 23 | 45 | 37.61 | | Resigned | |
| Jock Stein | Scotland | 4 April 1964 | 6 March 1965 | 50 | 31 | 8 | 11 | 62.00 | | Moved to Celtic | |
| Bob Shankly | Scotland | 10 March 1965 | 3 September 1969 | 230 | 117 | 36 | 77 | 50.87 | | Resigned | |
| Tom McNiven* | Scotland | 6 September 1969 | 20 September 1969 | 3 | 3 | 0 | 0 | 100.00 | | Caretaker | |
| Willie MacFarlane | Scotland | 27 September 1969 | 5 December 1970 | 57 | 28 | 12 | 17 | 49.12 | | Resigned | |
| Dave Ewing | Scotland | 9 December 1970 | 24 April 1971 | 26 | 7 | 7 | 12 | 26.92 | | | |
| Eddie Turnbull | Scotland | 14 August 1971 | 12 April 1980 | 454 | 219 | 110 | 125 | 48.24 | Scottish League Cup (1972–73) | Sacked | |
| Willie Ormond | Scotland | 16 April 1980 | 15 November 1980 | | 14 | 9 | 9 | 45.16 | | Retired | |
| Bertie Auld | Scotland | 22 November 1980 | 1 September 1982 | 78 | 30 | 27 | 21 | 38.46 | Scottish First Division (1980–81) | | |
| Pat Stanton | Scotland | 4 September 1982 | 15 September 1984 | 91 | 25 | 26 | 40 | 27.47 | | Resigned | |
| John Blackley | Scotland | 22 September 1984 | 15 November 1986 | 98 | 32 | 18 | 48 | 32.65 | | | |
| Alex Miller | Scotland | 6 December 1986 | 28 September 1996 | 453 | 158 | 140 | 155 | 34.88 | Scottish League Cup (1991–92) | Sacked | |
| Jocky Scott* | Scotland | 12 October 1996 | 28 December 1996 | 13 | 3 | 4 | 6 | 23.08 | | Caretaker | |
| Jim Duffy | Scotland | 1 January 1997 | 31 January 1998 | 48 | 10 | 15 | 23 | 20.83 | | Sacked | |
| Billy McNeill* | Scotland | 7 February 1998 | 7 February 1998 | 1 | 0 | 0 | 1 | 0.00 | | Caretaker | |
| Alex McLeish | Scotland | 21 February 1998 | 8 December 2001 | 163 | 77 | 41 | 45 | 47.24 | Scottish First Division (1998–99) | Moved to Rangers | |
| Donald Park* | Scotland | 12 December 2001 | 12 December 2001 | 1 | 0 | 1 | 0 | 0.00 | | Caretaker | |
| Franck Sauzée | France | 15 December 2001 | 16 February 2002 | 15 | 1 | 6 | 8 | 6.67 | | Sacked | |
| Bobby Williamson | Scotland | 2 March 2002 | 17 April 2004 | 91 | 34 | 20 | 37 | 37.36 | | Moved to Plymouth Argyle | |
| Gerry McCabe* | Scotland | 24 April 2004 | 15 May 2004 | 5 | 2 | 0 | 3 | 40.00 | | Caretaker | |
| Tony Mowbray | England | 3 July 2004 | 30 September 2006 | 108 | 52 | 16 | 40 | 48.15 | | Moved to West Bromwich Albion | |
| Mark Venus* | England | 15 October 2006 | 15 October 2006 | 1 | 0 | 1 | 0 | 0.00 | | Caretaker | |
| Mark Proctor* | England | 23 October 2006 | 30 October 2006 | 2 | 1 | 0 | 1 | 50.00 | | Caretaker | |
| John Collins | Scotland | 4 November 2006 | 15 December 2007 | 54 | 23 | 15 | 16 | 42.59 | Scottish League Cup (2006–07) | Resigned | |
| Tommy Craig* | Scotland | 22 December 2007 | 5 January 2008 | 4 | 0 | 1 | 3 | 0.00 | | Caretaker | |
| Mixu Paatelainen | Finland | 12 January 2008 | 24 May 2009 | 62 | 19 | 18 | 25 | 30.65 | | Left by mutual consent | |
| John Hughes | Scotland | 15 August 2009 | 2 October 2010 | 54 | 19 | 12 | 23 | 35.19 | | Left by mutual consent | |
| Alistair Stevenson* | Scotland | 16 October 2010 | 16 October 2010 | 1 | 1 | 0 | 0 | 100.00 | | Caretaker | (Note: Stevenson was in co-charge with coach Gareth Evans.) |
| Colin Calderwood | Scotland | 23 October 2010 | 5 November 2011 | 49 | 12 | 11 | 26 | 24.49 | | Sacked | |
| Billy Brown* | Scotland | 19 November 2011 | 19 November 2011 | 1 | 0 | 1 | 0 | 0.00 | | Caretaker | |
| Pat Fenlon | Ireland | 26 November 2011 | 30 October 2013 | 87 | 31 | 19 | 37 | 35.63 | | Resigned | |
| Jimmy Nicholl* | Northern Ireland | 3 November 2013 | 9 November 2013 | 2 | 0 | 0 | 2 | 0.00 | | Caretaker | |
| Terry Butcher | England | 23 November 2013 | 25 May 2014 | 29 | 6 | 8 | 15 | 20.69 | | Sacked | |
| Alan Stubbs | England | 5 August 2014 | 21 May 2016 | 100 | 58 | 19 | 23 | 58.00 | Scottish Cup (2015–16) | Moved to Rotherham United | |
| Neil Lennon | Northern Ireland | 14 July 2016 | 23 January 2019 | 123 | 59 | 40 | 24 | 47.97 | Scottish Championship (2016–17) | Left by mutual consent | |
| Eddie May* | Scotland | 27 January 2019 | 9 February 2019 | 4 | 2 | 0 | 2 | 50.00 | | Caretaker | |
| Paul Heckingbottom | England | 16 February 2019 | 2 November 2019 | 32 | 11 | 12 | 9 | 34.38 | | Sacked | |
| Eddie May* | Scotland | 9 November 2019 | 9 November 2019 | 1 | 1 | 0 | 0 | 100.00 | | Caretaker | |
| Jack Ross | Scotland | 23 November 2019 | 9 December 2021 | 96 | 47 | 20 | 29 | 48.96 | | Sacked | |
| David Gray* | Scotland | 9 December 2021 | 20 December 2021 | 3 | 1 | 1 | 1 | 33.33 | | Caretaker | |
| Shaun Maloney | Scotland | 20 December 2021 | 19 April 2022 | 19 | 6 | 6 | 7 | 31.58 | | Sacked | |
| David Gray* | Scotland | 19 April 2022 | 19 May 2022 | 5 | 2 | 1 | 2 | 40.00 | | Caretaker | |
| Lee Johnson | England | 19 May 2022 | 27 August 2023 | 52 | 20 | 8 | 24 | 38.46 | | Sacked | |
| David Gray* | Scotland | 27 August 2023 | 11 September 2023 | 2 | 1 | 0 | 1 | 50.00 | | Caretaker | |
| Nick Montgomery | Scotland | 11 September 2023 | 14 May 2024 | 37 | 12 | 12 | 13 | 32.43 | | Sacked | |
| David Gray (Note: Gray was initially the caretaker manager in his fourth spell at Hibernian, until he was appointed on a three-year contract on 6 June 2024. BBC Sport.) | Scotland | 14 May 2024 | 16 September 2026 | 109 | 44 | 30 | 35 | 40.37 | | Sacked | |
| John Potter* | Scotland | 16 September 2026 | 24 September 2026 | 1 | 0 | 1 | 0 | 0.00 | | Caretaker | |
| Marink Reedijk | Netherlands | 24 September 2026 | | 0 | 0 | 0 | 0 | — | | | |
