= 1950–51 Heart of Midlothian F.C. season =

Heart of Midlothian
1950–51 season
- Manager: David McLean (to February); Tommy Walker (from February)
- Stadium: Tynecastle Park
- Scottish First Division: 4th
- Scottish Cup: Round 3
- League Cup: Group Stage

During the 1950–51 season Hearts competed in the Scottish First Division, the Scottish Cup, the Scottish League Cup and the East of Scotland Shield.

== Fixtures ==
=== Friendlies ===
10 March 1951 Friendly	Hearts	1–0	Manchester City	Tynecastle Park
	Goal

31 March 1951 Friendly	St Mirren	2–5	Hearts	St Mirren Park, Love Street
	Goal

31 March 1951 Player Benefit	Brechin City	2–2	Hearts	Glebe Park
	Goal

12 May 1951 Stamford Bridge Trophy	Hearts	0–2	Chelsea	Tynecastle Park
	Goal

18 May 1951 Friendly	Hearts	4–0	Lisburn Distillery	Tynecastle Park
	Goal

26 May 1951 Tour	Fortuna Düsseldorf	0–2	Hearts	Rheinstadion
	Goal			Attendance: 10,000

27 May 1951 Tour	Offenbach Kickers	3–0	Hearts
	Goal			Attendance: 5,000

30 May 1951 Tour	FC Augsburg	5–1	Hearts
	Goal			Attendance: 9,000

2 June 1951 Tour	VfB Stuttgart	3–3	Hearts	Neckarstadion
	Goal			Attendance: 10,000

=== East of Scotland Shield ===
15 May 1951 Final	Hibernian	1–2	Hearts	Easter Road

=== League Cup ===
12 August 1950 League Cup Group	Partick Thistle	1–1	Hearts	Firhill Park
				Attendance: 34,000

16 August 1950 League Cup Group	Hearts	4–1	Motherwell	Tynecastle Park
				Attendance: 35,067

19 August 1950 League Cup Group	Hearts	3–2	Airdrieonians	Tynecastle Park
				Attendance: 28,649

26 August 1950 League Cup Group	Hearts	2–0	Partick Thistle	Tynecastle Park
				Attendance: 29,945

30 August 1950 League Cup Group	Motherwell	3–2	Hearts	Fir Park
				Attendance: 24,000

2 September 1950 League Cup Group	Airdrieonians	1–3	Hearts	Broomfield Park
				Attendance: 12,500

=== Scottish Cup ===
27 January 1951 Scottish Cup R1	Alloa Athletic	2–3	Hearts	Recreation Park
				Attendance: 8,500

10 February 1951 Scottish Cup R2	East Stirlingshire	1–5	Hearts	Firs Park
				Attendance: 11,000

24 February 1951 Scottish Cup R3	Hearts	1–2	Celtic	Tynecastle Park
				Attendance: 47,672

=== Scottish First Division ===
9 September 1950 Scottish First Division	Dundee	1–0	Hearts	Tynecastle Park
				Attendance: 25,000

16 September 1950 Scottish First Division	Hearts	5–1	East Fife	Tynecastle Park
				Attendance: 24,317

23 September 1950 Scottish First Division	Hibernian	0–1	Hearts	Easter Road
				Attendance: 44,976

30 September 1950 Scottish First Division	Hearts	1–0	St Mirren	Tynecastle Park
				Attendance: 22,027

7 October 1950 Scottish First Division	East Fife	1–4	Hearts	Bayview Park
				Attendance: 14,000

14 October 1950 Scottish First Division	Hearts	2–0	Airdrieonians	Tynecastle Park
				Attendance: 21,760

21 October 1950 Scottish First Division	Partick Thistle	5–2	Hearts	Firhill Park
				Attendance: 28,000

28 October 1950 Scottish First Division	Clyde	2–2	Hearts	Shawfield Stadium
				Attendance: 8,000

4 November 1950 Scottish First Division	Hearts	4–5	Partick Thistle	Tynecastle Park
				Attendance: 25,419

11 November 1950 Scottish First Division	Third Lanark	1–2	Hearts	Cathkin Park
				Attendance: 10,000

18 November 1950 Scottish First Division	Hearts	3–3	Motherwell	Tynecastle Park
				Attendance: 30,797

25 November 1950 Scottish First Division	Morton	0–1	Hearts	Cappielow Park
				Attendance: 11,000

2 December 1950 Scottish First Division	Aberdeen	2–0	Hearts	Pittodrie Park
				Attendance: 22,000

9 December 1950 Scottish First Division	Hearts	4–2	Falkirk	Tynecastle Park
				Attendance: 21,097

16 December 1950 Scottish First Division	Raith Rovers	2–0	Hearts	Stark's Park
				Attendance: 12,000

23 December 1950 Scottish First Division	Hearts	1–1	Dundee	Tynecastle Park
				Attendance: 22,147

30 December 1950 Scottish First Division	Celtic	2–2	Hearts	Celtic Park
				Attendance: 40,000

1 January 1951 Scottish First Division	Hearts	2–1	Hibernian	Tynecastle Park
				Attendance: 41,832

2 January 1951 Scottish First Division	St Mirren	1–0	Hearts	St Mirren Park, Love Street
				Attendance: 20,000

20 January 1951 Scottish First Division	Rangers	2–1	Hearts	Ibrox Park
				Attendance: 54,000

3 February 1951 Scottish First Division	Hearts	4–0	Clyde	Tynecastle Park
				Attendance: 18,401

17 February 1951 Scottish First Division	Hearts	4–0	Third Lanark	Tynecastle Park
				Attendance: 21,073

3 March 1951 Scottish First Division	Hearts	8–0	Morton	Tynecastle Park
				Attendance: 18,425

17 March 1951 Scottish First Division	Falkirk	5–4	Hearts	Brockville Park
				Attendance: 15,000

24 March 1951 Scottish First Division	Hearts	3–1	Raith Rovers	Tynecastle Park
				Attendance: 23,751

7 April 1951 Scottish First Division	Hearts	1–1	Celtic	Tynecastle Park
				Attendance: 14,242

14 April 1951 Scottish First Division	Airdrieonians	2–3	Hearts	Tynecastle Park
				Attendance: 10,000

18 April 1951 Scottish First Division	Hearts	4–1	Aberdeen	Tynecastle Park
				Attendance: 15,103

21 April 1951 Scottish First Division	Hearts	0–1	Rangers	Tynecastle Park
				Attendance: 38,371

5 May 1951 Scottish First Division	Motherwell	2–4	Hearts	Fir Park
				Attendance: 7,000

== See also ==
- List of Heart of Midlothian F.C. seasons
