= 1952–53 Heart of Midlothian F.C. season =

Heart of Midlothian
1952–53 season
- Manager: Tommy Walker
- Stadium: Tynecastle Park
- Scottish First Division: 4th
- Scottish Cup: Semi-finalists
- League Cup: Group Stage

During the 1952–53 season Hearts competed in the Scottish First Division, the Scottish Cup, the Scottish League Cup and the East of Scotland Shield.

== Fixtures ==
=== Friendlies ===
12 May 1953 Friendly	Hearts	1–3	Partick Thistle	Tynecastle Park
	Goal

15 May 1953 Friendly	Hearts	2–0	Tottenham Hotspur	Tynecastle Park
	Goal

19 May 1953 Friendly	AIK Stockholm	1–4	Hearts	Råsunda Stadium
	Goal

21 May 1953 Friendly	Djurgårdens IF	5–1	Hearts	Stockholm Olympic Stadium
	Goal

=== Penman Cup ===
9 May 1953 Round 2	Cowdenbeath	1–2	Hearts	Central Park

=== East of Scotland Shield ===
30 April 1953 Semi-Final	Hearts	2–1	Berwick Rangers	Tynecastle Park

7 May 1953 Final	Hibernian	4–2	Hearts	Easter Road

=== League Cup ===
9 August 1952 League Cup Group	Hearts	5–0	Rangers	Tynecastle Park
				Attendance: 41,533

13 August 1952 League Cup Group	Aberdeen	2–4	Hearts	Pittodrie Park
				Attendance: 33,000

16 August 1952 League Cup Group	Hearts	0–1	Motherwell	Tynecastle Park
				Attendance: 33,168

23 August 1952 League Cup Group	Rangers	2–0	Hearts	Ibrox Park
				Attendance: 75,000

27 August 1952 League Cup Group	Hearts	1–1	Aberdeen	Tynecastle Park
				Attendance: 22,454

30 August 1952 League Cup Group	Motherwell	1–2	Hearts	Fir Park
				Attendance: 18,000

=== Scottish Cup ===
7 February 1953 Scottish Cup R2	Raith Rovers	0–1	Hearts	Stark's Park
				Attendance: 31,306

21 February 1953 Scottish Cup R3	Hearts	3–1	Montrose	Tynecastle Park
				Attendance: 21,497

14 March 1953 Scottish Cup R4	Hearts	2–1	Queen of the South	Tynecastle Park
				Attendance: 30,477

4 April 1953 Scottish Cup SF	Hearts	1–2	Rangers	Hampden Park
				Attendance: 116,475

=== Scottish First Division ===
6 September 1952 Scottish First Division	Third Lanark	2–3	Hearts	Cathkin Park
				Attendance: 25,000

13 September 1952 Scottish First Division	Hearts	1–2	St Mirren	Tynecastle Park
				Attendance: 23,500

20 September 1952 Scottish First Division	Hibernian	3–1	Hearts	Easter Road
				Attendance: 50,000

27 September 1952 Scottish First Division	Hearts	4–0	Airdrieonians	Tynecastle Park
				Attendance: 18,456

4 October 1952 Scottish First Division	East Fife	3–1	Hearts	Bayview Park
				Attendance: 12,000

11 October 1952 Scottish First Division	Hearts	2–1	Partick Thistle	Tynecastle Park
				Attendance: 19,188

18 October 1952 Scottish First Division	Dundee	2–1	Hearts	Dens Park
				Attendance: 21,000

25 October 1952 Scottish First Division	Hearts	1–0	Celtic	Tynecastle Park
				Attendance: 33,260

1 November 1952 Scottish First Division	Hearts	0–1	Falkirk	Tynecastle Park
				Attendance: 16,888

8 November 1952 Scottish First Division	Queen of the South	4–2	Hearts	Palmerston Park
				Attendance: 9,000

15 November 1952 Scottish First Division	Aberdeen	3–0	Hearts	Pittodrie Park
				Attendance: 15,500

22 November 1952 Scottish First Division	Hearts	3–1	Motherwell	Tynecastle Park
				Attendance: 20,418

29 November 1952 Scottish First Division	Raith Rovers	1–1	Hearts	Stark's Park
				Attendance: 12,000

6 December 1952 Scottish First Division	Clyde	3–2	Hearts	Shawfield Stadium
				Attendance: 15,000

13 December 1952 Scottish First Division	Hearts	2–2	Rangers	Tynecastle Park
				Attendance: 26,100

20 December 1952 Scottish First Division	Hearts	3–3	Third Lanark	Tynecastle Park
				Attendance: 15,628

27 December 1952 Scottish First Division	St Mirren	1–0	Hearts	St Mirren Park, Love Street
				Attendance: 10,000

1 January 1953 Scottish First Division	Hearts	1–2	Hibernian	Tynecastle Park
				Attendance: 41,085

3 January 1953 Scottish First Division	Airdrieonians	1–2	Hearts	Broomfield Park
				Attendance: 13,000

17 January 1953 Scottish First Division	Partick Thistle	2–2	Hearts	Firhill Park
				Attendance: 20,000

24 January 1953 Scottish First Division	Motherwell	1–3	Hearts	Fir Park
				Attendance: 14,000

31 January 1953 Scottish First Division	Hearts	1–1	Dundee	Tynecastle Park
				Attendance: 20,581

14 February 1953 Scottish First Division	Celtic	0–0	Hearts	Celtic Park
				Attendance: 35,000

28 February 1953 Scottish First Division	Hearts	3–0	Queen of the South	Tynecastle Park
				Attendance: 22,660

7 March 1953 Scottish First Division	Hearts	3–1	Aberdeen	Tynecastle Park
				Attendance: 25,465

21 March 1953 Scottish First Division	Hearts	1–2	Raith Rovers	Tynecastle Park
				Attendance: 24,575

28 March 1953 Scottish First Division	Hearts	7–0	Clyde	Tynecastle Park
				Attendance: 18,031

6 April 1953 Scottish First Division	Rangers	3–0	Hearts	Ibrox Park
				Attendance: 40,000

18 April 1953 Scottish First Division	Falkirk	2–4	Hearts	Brockville Park
				Attendance: 10,700

28 April 1953 Scottish First Division	Hearts	4–2	East Fife	Tynecastle Park
				Attendance: 9,827

== See also ==
- List of Heart of Midlothian F.C. seasons
