= 1955–56 Heart of Midlothian F.C. season =

Heart of Midlothian
1955–56 season
- Manager: Tommy Walker
- Stadium: Tynecastle Park
- Scottish First Division: 3rd
- Scottish Cup: Winners
- League Cup: Group Stage

During the 1955–56 season, Hearts competed in the Scottish First Division, the Scottish Cup, the Scottish League Cup and the East of Scotland Shield.

== Fixtures ==
=== Friendlies ===
10 October 1955 Friendly	Newcastle United	2–2	Hearts	St James' Park
	Goal

7 November 1955 Friendly	Hearts	4–6	Newcastle United	Tynecastle Park
	Goal

6 February 1956 Friendly	Sheffield United	4–2	Hearts	Bramall Lane
	Goal

=== East of Scotland Shield ===
5 May 1956 Final	Hearts	2–1	Hibernian	Tynecastle Park
				Attendance: 20,000

=== League Cup ===
13 August 1955 League Cup Group	Partick Thistle	0–2	Hearts	Firhill Park
				Attendance: 25,000

17 August 1955 League Cup Group	Hearts	5–0	Raith Rovers	Tynecastle Park
				Attendance: 25,000

20 August 1955 League Cup Group	East Fife	0–1	Hearts	Bayview Park
				Attendance: 12,000

27 August 1955 League Cup Group	Hearts	2–1	Partick Thistle	Tynecastle Park
				Attendance: 30,000

31 August 1955 League Cup Group	Raith Rovers	0–2	Hearts	Stark's Park
				Attendance: 9,000

3 September 1955 League Cup Group	Hearts	4–0	East Fife	Tynecastle Park
				Attendance: 24,000

14 September 1955 League Cup Group	Aberdeen	5–3	Hearts	Pittodrie Park
				Attendance: 30,000

17 September 1955 League Cup Group	Hearts	2–4	Aberdeen	Tynecastle Park
				Attendance: 37,000

=== Scottish Cup ===
4 February 1956 Scottish Cup R5	Hearts	3–0	Forfar Athletic	Tynecastle Park
				Attendance: 11,007

18 February 1956 Scottish Cup R6	Hearts	5–0	Stirling Albion	Tynecastle Park
				Attendance: 19,645

3 March 1956 Scottish Cup R7	Hearts	4–0	Rangers	Tynecastle Park
				Attendance: 47,258

24 March 1956 Scottish Cup SF	Hearts	0–0	Raith Rovers	Easter Road
				Attendance: 58,448

28 March 1956 Scottish Cup SF Replay	Hearts	3–0	Raith Rovers	Easter Road
				Attendance: 54,233

21 April 1956 Scottish Cup Final	Hearts	3–1	Celtic	Hampden Park
				Attendance: 133,583

=== Scottish First Division ===
10 September 1955 Scottish First Division	Hearts	4–0	Dundee	Tynecastle Park
				Attendance: 26,000

24 September 1955 Scottish First Division	Hearts	0–1	Hibernian	Tynecastle Park
				Attendance: 45,000

1 October 1955 Scottish First Division	Airdrieonians	1–4	Hearts	Broomfield Park
				Attendance: 14,000

8 October 1955 Scottish First Division	Hearts	2–1	Celtic	Tynecastle Park
				Attendance: 31,000

15 October 1955 Scottish First Division	Queen of the South	4–3	Hearts	Palmerston Park
				Attendance: 11,000

22 October 1955 Scottish First Division	Hearts	3–1	East Fife	Tynecastle Park
				Attendance: 21,000

29 October 1955 Scottish First Division	St Mirren	3–1	Hearts	St Mirren Park, Love Street
				Attendance: 12,000

5 November 1955 Scottish First Division	Hearts	5–0	Stirling Albion	Tynecastle Park
				Attendance: 18,000

12 November 1955 Scottish First Division	Rangers	4–1	Hearts	Ibrox Park
				Attendance: 51,000

19 November 1955 Scottish First Division	Hearts	5–1	Kilmarnock	Tynecastle Park
				Attendance: 16,000

26 November 1955 Scottish First Division	Dunfermline Athletic	1–5	Hearts	East End Park
				Attendance: 14,000

3 December 1955 Scottish First Division	Hearts	3–0	Aberdeen	Tynecastle Park
				Attendance: 27,000

10 December 1955 Scottish First Division	Falkirk	1–1	Hearts	Brockville Park
				Attendance: 12,000

17 December 1955 Scottish First Division	Hearts	7–1	Motherwell	Tynecastle Park
				Attendance: 18,000

24 December 1955 Scottish First Division	Kilmarnock	2–4	Hearts	Rugby Park
				Attendance: 17,000

31 December 1955 Scottish First Division	Raith Rovers	1–1	Hearts	Stark's Park
				Attendance: 9,000

2 January 1956 Scottish First Division	Hibernian	2–2	Hearts	Easter Road
				Attendance: 60,812

7 January 1956 Scottish First Division	Hearts	5–0	Partick Thistle	Tynecastle Park
				Attendance: 22,000

14 January 1956 Scottish First Division	Dundee	0–2	Hearts	Dens Park
				Attendance: 17,000

21 January 1956 Scottish First Division	Hearts	4–1	Airdrieonians	Tynecastle Park
				Attendance: 20,000

28 January 1956 Scottish First Division	Celtic	1–1	Hearts	Celtic Park
				Attendance: 39,000

11 February 1956 Scottish First Division	Hearts	2–2	Queen of the South	Tynecastle Park
				Attendance: 20,000

25 February 1956 Scottish First Division	East Fife	1–4	Hearts	Bayview Park
				Attendance: 11,000

7 March 1956 Scottish First Division	Hearts	4–1	St Mirren	Tynecastle Park
				Attendance: 19,000

10 March 1956 Scottish First Division	Stirling Albion	0–2	Hearts	Annfield Stadium
				Attendance: 10,000

17 March 1956 Scottish First Division	Hearts	1–1	Rangers	Tynecastle Park
				Attendance: 50,000

31 March 1956 Scottish First Division	Hearts	5–0	Dunfermline Athletic	Tynecastle Park
				Attendance: 22,000

2 April 1956 Scottish First Division	Partick Thistle	0–2	Hearts	Firhill Park
				Attendance: 20,289

7 April 1956 Scottish First Division	Aberdeen	4–1	Hearts	Pittodrie Park
				Attendance: 24,000

11 April 1956 Scottish First Division	Clyde	2–2	Hearts	Shawfield Stadium
				Attendance: 4,000

16 April 1956 Scottish First Division	Hearts	8–3	Falkirk	Tynecastle Park
				Attendance: 15,000

23 April 1956 Scottish First Division	Motherwell	1–0	Hearts	Fir Park
				Attendance: 12,000

25 April 1956 Scottish First Division	Hearts	0–2	Kilmarnock	Tynecastle Park
				Attendance: 13,000

28 April 1956 Scottish First Division	Hearts	7–2	Raith Rovers	Tynecastle Park
				Attendance: 18,000

== See also ==
- List of Heart of Midlothian F.C. seasons
