= 1952–53 Hibernian F.C. season =

Hibernian
1952–53 season
- Manager: Hugh Shaw
- Scottish First Division: 2nd
- Scottish Cup: R4
- Scottish League Cup: SF
- Highest home attendance: 60,500 (v Rangers, 17 January)
- Lowest home attendance: 15,000 (v Raith Rovers, 29 April)
- Average home league attendance: 28,667 (down 2,033)

During the 1952–53 season Hibernian, a football club based in Edinburgh, came second out of 16 clubs in the Scottish First Division notably losing on goal average.

== Scottish First Division ==
Match Day	Date	Opponent	H/A	Score	Hibernian Scorer(s)	Attendance
1	6 September	Queen of the South	H	1–3		25,000
2	20 September	Heart of Midlothian	H	3–1		50,000
3	27 September	Motherwell	A	7–3		18,000
4	11 October	Rangers	A	2–1		65,000
5	18 October	Falkirk	H	4–2		25,000
6	25 October	Clyde	A	3–2		28,000
7	1 November	Third Lanark	A	0–2		12,000
8	8 November	Airdireonians	H	3–1		18,000
9	15 November	Dundee	H	3–0		30,000
10	22 November	East Fife	A	5–3		18,000
11	29 November	St Mirren	H	0–2		20,000
12	6 December	Celtic	H	1–1		32,500
13	13 December	Partick Thistle	A	4–5		18,000
14	20 December	Queen of the South	A	7–2		9,000
14	27 December	Aberdeen	H	3–0		20,000
15	1 January	Heart of Midlothian	A	2–1		41,085
17	3 January	Motherwell	A	7–2		26,000
18	10 January	Raith Rovers	A	2–4		20,000
19	17 January	Rangers	H	1–1		60,500
20	31 January	Falkirk	A	3–1		12,000
21	14 February	Clyde	H	5–1		30,000
22	28 February	Airdrieonians	A	7–3		16,000
23	7 March	Dundee	A	0–2		30,000
24	21 March	St Mirren	A	2–2		15,000
25	28 March	Celtic	A	3–1		20,000
26	4 April	Partick Thistle	H	1–1		30,000
27	11 April	Aberdeen	A	1–1		17,500
28	20 April	East Fife	H	2–1		47,000
29	25 April	Third Lanark	H	7–1		18,000
30	29 April	Raith Rovers	H	4–1		15,000

=== Final League table ===
P	Team	Pld	W	D	L	GF	GA	GD	Pts
1	Rangers	30	18	7	5	80	39	41	43
2	Hibernian	30	19	5	6	93	51	42	43
3	East Fife	30	16	7	7	72	48	24	39

=== Scottish League Cup ===
==== Group stage ====
Round	Date	Opponent	H/A	Score	Hibernian Scorer(s)	Attendance
G1	9 August	Partick Thistle	A	5–1		30,000
G1	13 August	St Mirren	H	5–2		25,000
G1	16 August	Celtic	A	0–2		30,000
G1	23 August	Partick Thistle	H	3–1		28,000
G1	27 August	St Mirren	A	1–3		15,000
G1	30 August	Celtic	H	3–0		52,000

==== Group 1 final table ====
P	Team	Pld	W	D	L	GF	GA	GD	Pts
1	Hibernian	6	4	0	2	17	9	8	8
2	Celtic	6	4	0	2	9	9	0	8
3	St Mirren	6	2	1	3	13	13	0	5
4	Partick Thistle	6	1	1	4	10	18	–8	3

==== Knockout stage ====
Round	Date	Opponent	H/A	Score	Hibernian Scorer(s)	Attendance
QF L1	13 September	Morton	A	6–0		12,000
QF L2	17 September	Morton	H	6–3		9,000
SF	4 October	Dundee	N	1–2		44,200

=== Scottish Cup ===
Round	Date	Opponent	H/A	Score	Hibernian Scorer(s)	Attendance
R1	24 January	Stenhousemuir	H	8–1		16,587
R2	7 February	Queen's Park	H	4–2		17,943
R3	21 February	Airdrieonians	A	4–0		27,000
R4	14 March	Aberdeen	H	1–1		47,585
R4 R	18 March	Aberdeen	A	0–2		41,880

== See also ==
- List of Hibernian F.C. seasons
