= 2001–02 Scottish Premier League =

96th season of top-tier football league in Scotland

Scottish Premier League
- Season: 2001–02
- Dates: 28 July 2001 – 12 May 2002
- Champions: Celtic; 2nd Premier League title 38th Scottish title
- Runner up: Rangers
- Relegated: St Johnstone
- Champions League: Celtic
- UEFA Cup: Rangers; Livingston; Aberdeen
- Matches: 228
- Goals: 617 (2.71 per match)
- Top goalscorer: Henrik Larsson (29)
- Biggest home win: Celtic 5–0 Dunfermline (9 February); Rangers 5–0 Kilmarnock (20 March); Celtic 5–0 Dunfermline (13 April)
- Biggest away win: Dundee United 1–6 Rangers (22 September)
- Highest scoring: Dunfermline 5–2 Motherwell (28 July); Dundee United 1–6 Rangers (22 September); Hibernian 3–4 Aberdeen (23 January)
- Highest attendance: 59,900; Celtic 5–1 Dundee United – 20 October
- Lowest attendance: 2,285; St Johnstone 0–3 Kilmarnock – 19 April
- Average attendance: 15,794 ( 111)

The 2001–2002 Scottish Premier League (known as the 2001–2002 Bank of Scotland Premier League for sponsorship reasons) was the fourth season of the Scottish Premier League, the top level of football in Scotland. It began on 28 July 2001 and concluded on 12 May 2002.

Celtic were the defending champions, and successfully retained the title with a 5–1 victory over Livingston on 6 April 2002.

== Changes from 2000–01 season ==
=== Winter break ===
This season was the first season since the Scottish Premier League (SPL) began in 1998–99 which did not have a winter break, meaning teams had to play throughout January. The break was abolished to avoid fixture congestion caused by more Scottish clubs participating in UEFA competitions and the upcoming FIFA World Cup. This change was criticised by many SPL managers, including Martin O'Neill and Alex McLeish.

=== European berths ===
Results in European competition over the previous five years saw the league move down from 15th to 16th in the UEFA country coefficient ranking. This meant that the league lost one of its berths in the UEFA Champions League qualifying rounds for the following season, and received an additional berth in the 2002–03 UEFA Cup qualifying round.

== Teams ==
Twelve clubs participated in the league in the 2001–02 season – the top eleven clubs in the 2000–01 Scottish Premier League and the champions of the 2000–01 Scottish First Division.

St Mirren were relegated from the top flight after only one season of participation. They were replaced by Livingston, who secured the First Division title and promotion to the SPL with a 3–2 victory away to Inverness Caledonian Thistle on 28 April 2001. This would be Livingston's first season at the top level of Scottish football in their 58-year history.

=== Stadia and locations ===
Aberdeen	Celtic	Dundee	Dundee United
Pittodrie Stadium	Celtic Park	Dens Park	Tannadice Park
Capacity: 20,866	Capacity: 60,411	Capacity: 11,506	Capacity: 14,223
Dunfermline Athletic	Location of teams in 2001–02 Scottish Premier League		Heart of Midlothian
East End Park	Location of teams in 2001–02 Scottish Premier League		Tynecastle Park
Capacity: 12,509	Location of teams in 2001–02 Scottish Premier League		Capacity: 17,420
Hibernian	Location of teams in 2001–02 Scottish Premier League		Kilmarnock
Easter Road	Location of teams in 2001–02 Scottish Premier League		Rugby Park
Capacity: 16,531	Location of teams in 2001–02 Scottish Premier League		Capacity: 17,889
Livingston	Motherwell	Rangers	St Johnstone
Almondvale Stadium	Fir Park	Ibrox Stadium	McDiarmid Park
Capacity: 10,016	Capacity: 13,677	Capacity: 50,817	Capacity: 10,696

=== Personnel and kits ===
Team	Manager	Kit manufacturer	Kit sponsor
Aberdeen	(Denmark) Ebbe Skovdahl	Le Coq Sportif	A-Fab
Celtic	(Northern Ireland) Martin O'Neill	Umbro	ntl:
Dundee	(Italy) Ivano Bonetti	Xara	Ceramic Tile Warehouse
Dundee United	(Scotland) Alex Smith	TFG Sports	Telewest
Dunfermline Athletic	(Scotland) Jimmy Calderwood	TFG Sports	RAC Auto Windscreens
Heart of Midlothian	(Scotland) Craig Levein	Erreà	Strongbow
Hibernian	(Scotland) Bobby Williamson	Le Coq Sportif	Carlsberg
Kilmarnock	(Scotland) Jim Jefferies	TFG Sports	Seriously Strong Cheddar
Livingston	(Scotland) Jim Leishman	Jerzeez	Motorola
Motherwell	(England) Terry Butcher	Xara	Motorola
Rangers	(Scotland) Alex McLeish	Nike	ntl:
St Johnstone	(Scotland) Billy Stark	Xara	Scottish Hydro Electric

==== Managerial changes ====
Team	Outgoing manager	Date of vacancy	Manner of departure	Position in table	Incoming manager	Date of appointment
Motherwell	(Scotland) Billy Davies	18 September 2001	Resigned	12th	(Scotland) Eric Black	16 October 2001
St Johnstone	(Scotland) Sandy Clark	25 September 2001	Sacked	12th	(Scotland) Billy Stark	5 October 2001
Rangers	(Netherlands) Dick Advocaat	12 December 2001	Resigned	2nd	(Scotland) Alex McLeish	13 December 2001
Hibernian	(Scotland) Alex McLeish	13 December 2001	Signed by Rangers	8th	(France) Franck Sauzée	14 December 2001
Hibernian	(France) Franck Sauzée	21 February 2002	Sacked	11th	(Scotland) Bobby Williamson	25 February 2002
Kilmarnock	(Scotland) Bobby Williamson	24 February 2002	Resigned	5th	(Scotland) Jim Jefferies	28 February 2002
Motherwell	(Scotland) Eric Black	24 April 2002	Resigned	11th	(England) Terry Butcher	24 April 2002

== Overview ==
The 2001–02 season would be a record-breaking season for Celtic, who won consecutive titles for the first time since they won the title in both 1981 and 1982. Celtic accrued the most points in a season of any team in the SPL era (103), achieved the most wins in a season (33), conceded the fewest goals (18) and lost the fewest games (their sole defeat at Aberdeen in December). They also went unbeaten at home for the entire league season – a run that would extend through the entirety of the following season, for 77 matches, until a defeat to Aberdeen on 21 April 2004. The only points Celtic dropped at home was in their final home game, an Old Firm derby against Rangers which was drawn 1–1. Celtic clinched the title at Celtic Park on 6 April 2002, with a 5–1 win against Livingston. Henrik Larsson again finished as the league's top scorer, with 29 goals.

Rangers started the season poorly and were 11 points behind Celtic when manager Dick Advocaat stepped aside and Hibernian manager Alex McLeish was appointed to replace him. However, Rangers still finished a distant 2nd, 18 points adrift of Celtic. They did, however, win the Scottish Cup and the League Cup, beating Celtic and Ayr United in the finals, respectively. They also reached the last 16 of the UEFA Cup, losing narrowly to eventual winners Feyenoord.

Alex McLeish's replacement at Hibernian was fan-favourite Franck Sauzée, who retired from playing to take the management role. However, he was sacked after only two months and 15 matches, having been eliminated from the League Cup in a shock loss to Ayr United, and the team second from bottom in the table. Hibernian did not win a league match with Sauzée in charge. Sauzée served as manager for the shortest time of any manager in Hibernian's history (69 days). Sauzée was replaced by Bobby Williamson, who led the team to safety in 10th place.

Newly promoted Livingston, under Jim Leishman, confounded pundits by finishing their first ever season in the top league in third-place, earning a spot in the 2002–03 UEFA Cup.

The 2001–02 season was the first in which the financial situation of SPL clubs was questioned. Total debt among all twelve SPL clubs was estimated during 2001–02 to be around £132m, having been barely into double figures two years previously. The end of television coverage from Sky Sports caused multiple clubs in the league to suffer severe financial difficulties. In pre-season, Motherwell lost a number of players, including Andy Goram and Lee McCulloch, in an attempt to reduce the clubs wage bill. Manager Billy Davies also resigned early on in the season. Motherwell became the first SPL club to enter administration in April 2002, with debts of £11 million and a wage bill totalling 97% of the club's annual turnover. Davies' replacement, Eric Black, and chief executive Pat Nevin both left their roles with only two matches to go of the season once administration hit, and 19 of the club's players were made redundant at the end of the season.

Despite Motherwell's financial difficulties, it was St Johnstone who finished the season as the bottom team in the league, with only 21 points, 19 points behind 11th place. Their relegation to the First Division was confirmed on 6 April 2002, after a 1–1 draw against Motherwell left them 14 points adrift with 4 matches to play.

== Format ==
In the initial phase of the season, each of the twelve teams play the other eleven teams three times. After 33 rounds, the league splits into two sections, a top six and a bottom six, with each team playing all the other teams in their section once. The league attempts to balance the fixture list so that teams in the same section have played each other twice at home and twice away, but sometimes this is impossible. A total of 228 matches will be played, with 38 matches played by each team.

== League table ==
Pos	Team	Pld	W	D	L	GF	GA	GD	Pts	Qualification or relegation (Note: Teams played each other three times (33 matches), before the league split into two groups (the top six and the bottom six) for the last five matches.)
1	Celtic (C)	38	33	4	1	94	18	+76	103	Qualification for the Champions League third qualifying round
2	Rangers	38	25	10	3	82	27	+55	85	Qualification for the UEFA Cup first round
3	Livingston	38	16	10	12	50	47	+3	58	Qualification for the UEFA Cup qualifying round (Note: As both finalists of the 2001–02 Scottish Cup, Rangers and Celtic, qualified for European competition via their league position, the cup berth for 2002–03 UEFA Cup was passed to the next-placed team in the league, fourth-placed Aberdeen.)
4	Aberdeen	38	16	7	15	51	49	+2	55	Qualification for the UEFA Cup qualifying round
5	Heart of Midlothian	38	14	6	18	52	57	−5	48	
6	Dunfermline Athletic	38	12	9	17	41	64	−23	45	
7	Kilmarnock	38	13	10	15	44	54	−10	49	
8	Dundee United	38	12	10	16	38	59	−21	46	
9	Dundee	38	12	8	18	41	55	−14	44	
10	Hibernian	38	10	11	17	51	56	−5	41	
11	Motherwell	38	11	7	20	49	69	−20	40	
12	St Johnstone (R)	38	5	6	27	24	62	−38	21	Relegation to the First Division

Source: Scottish Professional Football League
Rules for classification: (1) Points; (2) Goal difference; (3) Goals scored
(C) Champions; (R) Relegated

== Results ==
=== Matches 1–22 ===
During matches 1–22 each team played every other team twice (home and away).

Home \ Away	ABE	CEL	DND	DUN	DNF	HOM	HIB	KIL	LIV	MOT	RAN	STJ
Aberdeen		2–0	0–0	2–1	3–2	3–2	2–0	2–0	0–3	4–2	0–3	1–0
Celtic	2–0		3–1	5–1	3–1	2–0	3–0	1–0	3–2	2–0	2–1	3–0
Dundee	1–4	0–4		1–1	2–2	1–1	2–1	1–2	1–0	3–1	0–0	1–1
Dundee United	1–1	0–4	2–2		3–2	0–2	3–1	0–2	0–0	1–1	1–6	2–1
Dunfermline Athletic	1–0	0–4	1–0	1–1		0–1	1–0	0–2	1–2	5–2	1–4	2–1
Heart of Midlothian	1–0	0–1	3–1	1–2	1–1		1–1	2–0	1–3	3–1	2–2	3–0
Hibernian	2–0	1–4	1–2	0–1	5–1	2–1		2–2	0–3	1–1	0–3	4–0
Kilmarnock	3–1	0–1	0–1	2–0	0–0	1–0	0–0		1–5	2–0	2–2	2–1
Livingston	2–2	0–0	1–0	2–0	0–0	2–1	1–0	0–1		3–1	0–2	2–1
Motherwell	3–2	1–2	4–2	0–0	1–0	2–0	1–3	2–2	0–0		2–2	1–2
Rangers	2–0	0–2	2–0	3–2	4–0	3–1	2–2	3–1	0–0	3–0		1–0
St Johnstone	0–1	1–2	0–2	0–1	0–2	0–2	0–0	1–0	2–2	2–3	0–2	

Source: Soccerbase
Legend: Blue = home team win; Yellow = draw; Red = away team win.

=== Matches 23–33 ===
During matches 23–33 each team played every other team once (either at home or away). This means that during matches 1-33 each team played every other team 3 times (either 1 home, 2 away or 2 home, 1 away).

Home \ Away	ABE	CEL	DND	DUN	DNF	HOM	HIB	KIL	LIV	MOT	RAN	STJ
Aberdeen				4–0	4–1			1–0		1–0	0–1	
Celtic	1–0			1–0	5–0	2–0						2–1
Dundee	2–3	0–3					1–0		2–0	2–0		1–0
Dundee United			1–0		0–2		1–2	0–2			0–1	
Dunfermline Athletic			2–0			1–1		2–0	1–0	3–1	2–4	
Heart of Midlothian	3–1		2–0	1–2							0–2	1–3
Hibernian	3–4	1–1			1–1	1–2		2–2				3–0
Kilmarnock		0–2	3–2			3–3			1–1			0–1
Livingston	0–0	1–3		1–1		2–0	0–3					
Motherwell		0–4		2–0		1–2	4–0	2–0	1–2			
Rangers		1–1	2–1				1–1	5–0	3–0	3–0		
St Johnstone	1–1			1–4	0–1				3–0	0–2	0–2	

Source: Soccerbase
Legend: Blue = home team win; Yellow = draw; Red = away team win.

=== Matches 34–38 ===
During matches 34–38 each team played every other team in their half of the table once (either at home or away).

==== Top six ====
Home \ Away	ABE	CEL	DNF	HOM	LIV	RAN
Aberdeen		0–1		2–3	3–0	
Celtic			5–0		5–1	1–1
Dunfermline Athletic	0–0					1–1
Heart of Midlothian		1–4	2–0		2–3	
Livingston			4–1			2–1
Rangers	2–0			2–0		

Source: Soccerbase
Legend: Blue = home team win; Yellow = draw; Red = away team win.

==== Bottom Six ====
Home \ Away	DND	DUN	HIB	KIL	MOT	STJ
Dundee		0–1		2–0		
Dundee United			2–1		1–0	0–0
Hibernian	2–2				4–0	
Kilmarnock		2–2	1–0		1–4	
Motherwell	2–1					1–1
St Johnstone	0–1		0–1	0–3		

Source: Soccerbase
Legend: Blue = home team win; Yellow = draw; Red = away team win.

== Top scorers ==
Rank	Player	Club	Goals
1	(Sweden) Henrik Larsson	Celtic	29
2	(Wales) John Hartson	Celtic	19
3	(Norway) Tore André Flo	Rangers	18
4	(Scotland) Robbie Winters	Aberdeen	13
5	(Argentina) Juan Sara	Dundee	11
5	(Georgia (country)) Shota Arveladze	Rangers	11
7	(Northern Ireland) Stuart Elliot	Motherwell	10
7	(Scotland) James McFadden	Motherwell	10
9	(Scotland) Garry O'Connor	Hibernian	9
9	(Canada) Kevin McKenna	Heart of Midlothian	9
11	(Scotland) Darren Mackie	Aberdeen	8
11	(Morocco) Hicham Zerouali	Aberdeen	8

Source: SPL official website

== Attendances ==
The average attendances for SPL clubs during the 2001–02 season are shown below:

Team	Average
Celtic	58,511
Rangers	47,879
Aberdeen	14,035
Heart of Midlothian	12,080
Hibernian	11,587
Dundee United	8,007
Dundee	7,958
Kilmarnock	7,621
Livingston	7,477
Dunfermline Athletic	6,363
Motherwell	5,878
St Johnstone	4,580

Source: SPL official website

== Awards ==
=== Monthly awards ===
Month	Manager	Player	Young Player
August	(Northern Ireland) Martin O'Neill (Celtic)	(Trinidad and Tobago) Marvin Andrews (Livingston)	(Scotland) Stephen Hughes (Rangers)
September	(Scotland) Jim Leishman (Livingston)	(Bulgaria) Stiliyan Petrov (Celtic)	(Scotland) Peter MacDonald (St Johnstone)
October	(Netherlands) Dick Advocaat (Rangers)	(Scotland) Gavin Rae (Dundee)	(Scotland) Ian Murray (Hibernian)
November	(Scotland) Jim Leishman (Livingston)	(Scotland) Robert Douglas (Celtic)	(Scotland) Kevin McNaughton (Aberdeen)
December	(Scotland) Craig Levein (Heart of Midlothian)	(Jamaica) Ricardo Fuller (Heart of Midlothian)	(Scotland) Stephen Murray (Kilmarnock)
January	(Scotland) Alex Smith (Dundee United)	(Italy) Lorenzo Amoruso (Rangers)	(Scotland) James McFadden (Motherwell)
February	(Scotland) Alex McLeish (Rangers)	(Scotland) Barry Ferguson (Rangers)	(Scotland) Kevin McNaughton (Aberdeen)
March	(Scotland) Jimmy Calderwood (Dunfermline Athletic)	(Scotland) Garry O'Connor (Hibernian)	(Scotland) Stephen Crainey (Celtic)
April	(Northern Ireland) Martin O'Neill (Celtic)	(Wales) John Hartson (Celtic)	(Scotland) Stuart Duff (Dundee United)

=== Annual awards ===
- Player awards

Award	Winner	Club
PFA Players' Player of the Year	(Italy) Lorenzo Amoruso	Rangers
PFA Young Player of the Year	(Scotland) Kevin McNaughton	Aberdeen
SFWA Footballer of the Year	(Scotland) Paul Lambert	Celtic
SFWA Young Player of the Year	(Scotland) James McFadden	Motherwell

- Manager awards

Award	Winner	Club
SFWA Manager of the Year	(Scotland) John Lambie	Partick Thistle
