= 1955–56 Hibernian F.C. season =

Hibernian
1955–56 season
- Manager: Hugh Shaw
- Scottish First Division: 4th
- Scottish Cup: R5
- Scottish League Cup: GS
- Highest home attendance: 60,182 (v Heart of Midlothian, 2 January)
- Lowest home attendance: 7000 (v Dunfermline Athletic, 20 August)
- Average home league attendance: 20,224 (down 2601)

During the 1955–56 season Hibernian, a football club based in Edinburgh, came fourth out of 18 clubs in the Scottish First Division.

== Scottish First Division ==
Match Day	Date	Opponent	H/A	Score	Hibernian Scorer(s)	Attendance
1	10 September	Aberdeen	A	2–6		17,000
2	17 September	Clyde	A	2–2		12,000
3	24 September	Heart of Midlothian	A	1–0		45,000
4	1 October	Kilmarnock	H	2–1		20,000
5	15 October	Falkirk	H	2–0		20,000
6	22 October	Dunfermline Athletic	A	1–2		13,000
7	29 October	Airdrieonians	H	3–3		15,000
8	5 November	Raith Rovers	A	4–0		12,000
9	12 November	East Fife	H	3–1		12,000
10	19 November	Queen of the South	A	3–1		11,000
11	26 November	Partick Thistle	H	5–1		15,000
12	3 December	St Mirren	A	1–0		12,000
13	10 December	Dundee	H	6–3		7,000
14	17 December	Rangers	A	1–4		50,000
14	24 December	Celtic	H	2–3		32,000
15	31 December	Stirling Albion	H	6–1		10,000
17	2 January	Heart of Midlothian	H	2–2		60,812
18	3 January	Clyde	H	1–0		20,000
19	14 January	Aberdeen	H	1–3		25,000
20	21 January	Kilmarnock	A	1–0		14,000
21	28 January	Motherwell	H	6–0		15,000
22	11 February	Falkirk	A	0–2		12,000
23	25 February	Dunfermline Athletic	H	7–1		18,000
24	7 March	Airdrioenians	A	1–3		4,000
25	10 March	Raith Rovers	H	2–2		25,000
26	17 March	East Fife	A	2–1		8,000
27	21 March	Queen of the South	H	4–1		9,000
28	31 March	Partick Thistle	A	1–1		23,000
29	7 April	St Mirren	H	2–0		10,000
30	16 April	Motherwell	A	1–1		8,000
31	21 April	Rangers	H	2–2		30,000
32	23 April	Dundee	A	2–3		7,000
33	25 April	Celtic	A	3–0		9,500
34	28 April	Stirling Albion	A	3–0		5,000

=== Final League table ===
P	Team	Pld	W	D	L	GF	GA	GD	Pts
3	Heart of Midlothian	34	19	7	8	99	47	52	45
4	Hibernian	34	19	7	8	86	50	36	45
5	Celtic	34	16	9	9	55	39	16	41

=== Scottish League Cup ===
==== Group stage ====
Round	Date	Opponent	H/A	Score	Hibernian Scorer(s)	Attendance
G3	13 August	Aberdeen	A	0–1		40,000
G3	17 August	Clyde	A	2–2		10,000
G3	20 August	Dunfermline Athletic	H	3–1		6,000
G3	27 August	Aberdeen	A	1–2		30,000
G3	31 August	Clyde	H	2–1		15,000
G3	3 September	Dunfermline Athletic	A	3–1		14,000

==== Group 3 final table ====
P	Team	Pld	W	D	L	GF	GA	GD	Pts
1	Aberdeen	6	5	1	0	18	8	10	11
2	Hibernian	6	3	1	2	11	8	3	7
3	Dunfermline Athletic	6	1	1	4	12	16	–4	3
4	Clyde	6	1	1	4	11	15	–4	3

=== Scottish Cup ===
Round	Date	Opponent	H/A	Score	Hibernian Scorer(s)	Attendance
R5	4 February	Raith Rovers	H	1–1		26,024
R5 R	13 February	Raith Rovers	A	1–3		20,000

=== European Cup ===
Round	Date	Opponent	H/A	Score	Hibernian Scorer(s)	Attendance
R1 L1	14 September	(West Germany) Rot-Weiss Essen	A	4–0		5,000
R1 L2	12 October	(West Germany) Rot-Weiss Essen	H	1–1		30,000
QF L1	23 November	(Sweden) Djurgårdens IF	A	3–1		21,962
QF L2	28 November	(Sweden) Djurgårdens IF	H	1–0		31,346
SF L1	4 April	(France) Stade de Reims	A	0–2		35,486
SF L2	18 April	(France) Stade de Reims	H	0–1		44,941

== See also ==
- List of Hibernian F.C. seasons
