= 1951–52 Hibernian F.C. season =

Hibernian
1951–52 season
- Manager: Hugh Shaw
- Scottish First Division: 1st
- Scottish Cup: R1
- Scottish League Cup: Group Stage
- Saint Mungo Cup: SF
- Highest home attendance: 55000 (v Rangers, 3 November)
- Lowest home attendance: 20,000 (v Motherwell, 21 April)
- Average home league attendance: 30,700 (up 4,368)

During the 1951–52 season Hibernian, a football club based in Edinburgh, came first out of 16 clubs in the Scottish First Division.

== Scottish First Division ==
Match Day	Date	Opponent	H/A	Score	Hibernian Scorer(s)	Attendance
1	8 September	Raith Rovers	A	2–0		18,000
2	15 September	Aberdeen	H	4–4		32,000
3	22 September	Heart of Midlothian	A	1–1		44,842
4	29 September	Third Lanark	H	5–2		28,000
5	6 October	Stirling Albion	A	4–1		14,000
6	13 October	Morton	H	1–0		24,000
7	20 October	Partick Thistle	H	5–0		22,000
8	27 October	Celtic	A	1–1		50,000
9	3 November	Rangers	H	1–1		55,000
10	10 November	Morton	A	1–2		7,000
11	17 November	East Fife	H	4–2		40,000
12	24 November	Airdrieonians	A	2–0		11,000
13	1 December	Dundee	A	4–1		26,000
14	8 December	Queen of the South	H	5–0		25,000
14	15 December	St Mirren	A	4–0		20,000
15	22 December	Raith Rovers	H	5–0		24,500
17	29 December	Motherwell	A	1–3		15,000
18	1 January	Heart of Midlothian	H	2–3		39,000
19	2 January	Third Lanark	A	5–0		14,000
20	5 January	Stirling Albion	H	8–0		23,000
21	12 January	Aberdeen	A	2–1		22,000
22	19 January	Partick Thistle	A	2–1		30,000
23	2 February	Celtic	H	3–1		42,000
24	13 February	Rangers	A	2–2		45,000
25	16 February	St Mirren	H	5–2		30,000
26	23 February	East Fife	A	1–3		19,000
27	1 March	Airdrieonians	H	4–0		30,000
28	15 March	Queen of the South	A	2–5		11,500
29	9 April	Dundee	H	3–1		26,000
30	21 April	Motherwell	H	3–1		20,000

=== Final League table ===
P	Team	Pld	W	D	L	GF	GA	GD	Pts
1	Hibernian	30	20	5	5	92	36	56	45
2	Rangers	30	16	9	5	61	31	30	41
3	East Fife	30	17	3	10	71	49	22	37

=== Scottish League Cup ===
==== Group stage ====
Round	Date	Opponent	H/A	Score	Hibernian Scorer(s)	Attendance
G2	11 August	Partick Thistle	A	2–4		30,000
G2	15 August	Motherwell	H	0–4		30,000
G2	18 August	Stirling Albion	H	4–2		22,000
G2	25 August	Partick Thistle	H	5–1		45,000
G2	29 August	Motherwell	A	0–1		20,000
G2	1 September	Stirling Albion	A	1–1		9,100

==== Group 2 final table ====
P	Team	Pld	W	D	L	GF	GA	GD	Pts
1	Motherwell	6	4	1	1	16	9	7	9
2	Celtic	6	2	2	2	8	10	–2	6
3	Hibernian	6	2	1	3	12	13	–1	5
4	Stirling Albion	6	1	2	3	10	14	–4	4

=== Scottish Cup ===
Round	Date	Opponent	H/A	Score	Hibernian Scorer(s)	Attendance
R1	26 January	Raith Rovers	A	0–0		30,206
R1 R	30 January	Raith Rovers	H	0–0		30,000
R1 2R	4 February	Raith Rovers	N	1–4		33,614

=== Saint Mungo Cup ===
Round	Date	Opponent	H/A	Score	Hibernian Scorer(s)	Attendance
R1	14 July	Third Lanark	H	3–1	Johnstone (2), Turnbull	22,000
R2	21 July	Motherwell	N	3–1	Turnbull (penalty), Souness, Johnstone	20,000
SF	25 July	Aberdeen	N	1–1	Smith	27,000
SF R	28 July	Aberdeen	A	1–2	Turnbull (penalty)	28,000

== See also ==
- List of Hibernian F.C. seasons
