= 1956–57 Hibernian F.C. season =

Hibernian
1956–57 season
- Manager: Hugh Shaw
- Scottish First Division: 9th
- Scottish Cup: R5
- Scottish League Cup: GS
- Highest home attendance: 40,000 (v Heart of Midlothian, 25 August) (v Rangers, 2 March)
- Lowest home attendance: 7000 (v Dunfermline Athletic, 20 April)
- Average home league attendance: 18,176 (down 2048)

During the 1956–57 season Hibernian, a football club based in Edinburgh, came ninth out of 18 clubs in the Scottish First Division.

== Scottish First Division ==
Match Day	Date	Opponent	H/A	Score	Hibernian Scorer(s)	Attendance
1	8 September	Falkirk	H	6–1		20,000
2	15 September	Queen of the South	A	0–2		8,000
3	22 September	Heart of Midlothian	H	2–3		39,000
4	29 September	Aberdeen	A	1–3		18,000
5	6 October	Queen's Park	H	1–1		16,000
6	13 October	Raith Rovers	A	1–1		12,000
7	20 October	Motherwell	H	1–1		18,000
8	27 October	Kilmarnock	H	0–0		14,000
9	3 November	Rangers	A	3–5		45,000
10	10 November	Dundee	H	1–1		12,000
11	17 November	Partick Thistle	A	0–3		14,000
12	24 November	East Fife	A	6–1		8,000
13	1 December	Ayr United	H	3–1		10,000
14	8 December	Airdireonians	A	3–5		8,000
14	15 December	St Mirren	H	1–1		8,000
15	22 December	Dunfermline Athletic	A	3–1		6,000
17	29 December	Celtic	H	3–3		31,000
18	1 January	Heart of Midlothian	A	2–0		35,000
19	2 January	Queen of the South	H	1–1		15,000
20	5 January	Falkirk	A	1–0		8,000
21	12 January	Aberdeen	H	4–1		25,000
22	19 January	Queen's Park	A	1–2		11,043
23	26 January	Raith Rovers	H	1–4		15,000
24	9 February	Motherwell	A	0–3		15,000
25	23 February	Kilmarnock	A	1–2		9,297
26	2 March	Rangers	H	2–3		40,000
27	9 March	Dundee	A	3–0		13,000
28	16 March	Partick Thistle	H	2–0		15,000
29	23 March	East Fife	H	4–0		16,000
30	30 March	Ayr United	A	3–2		7,500
31	6 April	Airdrieonians	H	6–0		8,000
32	13 April	St Mirren	A	2–4		9,000
33	20 April	Dunfermline Athletic	H	0–0		7,000
34	27 April	Celtic	A	1–2		12,000

=== Final League table ===
P	Team	Pld	W	D	L	GF	GA	GD	Pts
8	Partick Thistle	34	13	8	13	53	51	2	34
9	Hibernian	34	12	9	13	69	56	13	33
10	Dundee	34	13	6	15	55	61	–6	32

=== Scottish League Cup ===
==== Group stage ====
Round	Date	Opponent	H/A	Score	Hibernian Scorer(s)	Attendance
G4	11 August	Heart of Midlothian	A	1–6		28,000
G4	15 August	Falkirk	H	0–1		25,000
G4	18 August	Partick Thistle	A	1–4		25,000
G4	25 August	Heart of Midlothian	H	1–2		40,000
G4	29 August	Falkirk	A	0–4		12,000
G4	1 September	Partick Thistle	H	2–2		30,000

==== Group 4 final table ====
P	Team	Pld	W	D	L	GF	GA	GD	Pts
1	Partick Thistle	6	4	2	0	15	6	9	10
2	Heart of Midlothian	6	3	2	1	17	8	9	8
3	Falkirk	6	2	1	3	6	10	–4	5
4	Hibernian	6	0	1	5	5	19	–14	1

=== Scottish Cup ===
Round	Date	Opponent	H/A	Score	Hibernian Scorer(s)	Attendance
R2	2 February	Aberdeen	H	3–4		27,294

== See also ==
- List of Hibernian F.C. seasons
