= 1947–48 Hibernian F.C. season =

Hibernian
1947–48 season
- Manager: Willie McCartney (to 31 January); Hugh Shaw (from 31 January)
- Scottish First Division: 1st
- Scottish Cup: SF
- Scottish League Cup: GS
- Highest home attendance: 52750 (v Rangers, 31 January)
- Lowest home attendance: 15000 (v Clyde, 27 September)
- Average home league attendance: 25,388 (up 1,163)

During the 1947–48 season Hibernian, a football club based in Edinburgh, came first out of 16 clubs in the Scottish First Division.

== Scottish First Division ==
Match Day	Date	Opponent	H/A	Score	Hibernian Scorer(s)	Attendance
1	13 August	Aberdeen	A	2–0		40,000
2	27 August	Airdrieonians	H	7–1		26,500
3	20 September	Heart of Midlothian	A	1–2		47,752
4	27 September	Clyde	H	2–1		15,000
5	4 October	Queen's Park	A	3–2		16,078
6	11 October	Queen of the South	H	6–0		22,000
7	18 October	Rangers	H	1–2		55,000
8	25 October	Morton	H	1–1		20,000
9	1 November	Motherwell	A	2–0		16,000
10	8 November	Third Lanark	H	8–0		25,000
11	15 November	Dundee	H	2–1		30,000
12	22 November	Falkirk	A	1–3		16,000
13	29 November	St Mirren	H	5–0		20,000
14	6 December	Partick Thistle	A	1–1		28,000
14	13 December	Celtic	H	1–1		38,000
15	20 December	Aberdeen	H	4–0		30,000
17	27 December	Airdrieonians	A	3–0		3,000
18	1 January	Heart of Midlothian	H	3–1		45,000
19	3 January	Clyde	A	2–2		20,400
20	10 January	Queen's Park	H	4–0		22,000
21	17 January	Queen of the South	A	3–0		9,000
22	31 January	Rangers	H	1–0		52,750
23	14 February	Morton	A	2–1		14,000
24	28 February	Third Lanark	A	4–1		25,000
25	13 March	Falkirk	H	2–0		28,000
26	20 March	St Mirren	A	4–2		25,000
27	3 April	Celtic	A	4–2		30,000
28	17 April	Partick Thistle	H	1–0		25,000
29	19 April	Motherwell	H	5–0		20,000
30	1 May	Dundee	A	1–3		30,000

=== Final League table ===
P	Team	Pld	W	D	L	GF	GA	GD	Pts
1	Hibernian	30	22	4	4	86	27	59	48
2	Rangers	30	21	4	5	64	28	36	46
3	Partick Thistle	30	16	4	10	61	42	19	36

=== Scottish League Cup ===
==== Group stage ====
Round	Date	Opponent	H/A	Score	Hibernian Scorer(s)	Attendance
G4	9 August	Heart of Midlothian	A	1–2		39,268
G4	16 August	Clyde	H	5–1		25,000
G4	23 August	Airdrieonians	A	1–1		20,000
G4	30 August	Heart of Midlothian	H	1–2		43,000
G4	6 September	Clyde	A	4–3		15,000
G4	13 September	Airdrieonians	H	5–0		25,000

==== Group 4 final table ====
P	Team	Pld	W	D	L	GF	GA	GD	Pts
1	Heart of Midlothian	6	4	0	2	10	10	0	8
2	Hibernian	6	3	1	2	17	9	8	7
3	Airdrieonians	6	2	1	3	9	14	–5	5
4	Clyde	6	2	0	4	14	17	–3	4

=== Scottish Cup ===
Round	Date	Opponent	H/A	Score	Hibernian Scorer(s)	Attendance
R1	24 January	Albion Rovers	A	2–0		13,000
R2	7 February	Arbroath	H	4–0		19,500
R3	7 February	Aberdeen	H	4–2		19,500
R4	21 February	St Mirren	H	3–1		38,000
SF	27 March	Rangers	N	0–1		142,070

== See also ==
- List of Hibernian F.C. seasons
