= 1953–54 Hibernian F.C. season =

Hibernian
1953–54 season
- Manager: Hugh Shaw
- Scottish First Division: 5th
- Scottish Cup: R3
- Scottish League Cup: SF
- Highest home attendance: 45,000 (v Celtic, 17 April)
- Lowest home attendance: 7000 (v Aberdeen, 19 April)
- Average home league attendance: 22,020 (down 6,647)

During the 1953–54 season Hibernian, a football club based in Edinburgh, came fifth out of 16 clubs in the Scottish First Division.

== Scottish First Division ==
Match Day	Date	Opponent	H/A	Score	Hibernian Scorer(s)	Attendance
1	5 September	Raith Rovers	A	0–4		18,000
2	19 September	Heart of Midlothian	A	0–4		45,000
3	26 September	Hamilton Academical	H	4–1		20,000
4	3 October	Queen of the South	A	2–3		16,000
5	17 October	Falkirk	A	4–2		16,000
6	24 October	Clyde	H	4–0		25,000
7	31 October	Partick Thistle	H	1–2		25,000
8	7 November	Celtic	A	2–2		42,000
9	14 November	St Mirren	A	3–3		20,000
10	21 November	East Fife	H	2–1		25,000
11	28 November	Dundee	A	0–1		26,000
12	5 December	Airdrieonians	A	2–2		10,000
13	12 December	Stirling Albion	H	1–2		20,000
14	19 December	Raith Rovers	H	5–0		20,000
14	26 December	Rangers	A	0–2		28,000
15	1 January	Heart of Midlothian	H	1–2		43,000
17	2 January	Hamilton Academical	A	6–2		9,500
18	9 January	Queen of the South	H	1–0		24,000
19	16 January	Aberdeen	A	3–1		17,500
20	23 January	Falkirk	H	2–3		15,000
21	6 February	Clyde	A	6–3		16,000
22	20 February	Partick Thistle	A	2–0		32,000
23	6 March	St Mirren	H	2–1		13,000
24	13 March	East Fife	A	3–1		8,500
25	20 March	Dundee	H	2–0		12,000
26	27 March	Airdrieonains	H	8–1		14,000
27	7 April	Stirling Albion	A	1–2		5,000
28	17 April	Celtic	H	0–3		45,000
29	19 April	Aberdeen	H	3–0		7,000
30	26 April	Rangers	H	2–2		17,300

=== Final League table ===
P	Team	Pld	W	D	L	GF	GA	GD	Pts
4	Rangers	30	13	8	9	56	35	21	34
5	Hibernian	30	15	4	11	72	51	21	34
6	East Fife	30	13	8	9	55	45	10	34

=== Scottish League Cup ===
==== Group stage ====
Round	Date	Opponent	H/A	Score	Hibernian Scorer(s)	Attendance
G1	8 August	Queen of the South	A	4–0		13,500
G1	12 August	Falkirk	A	4–1		10,000
G1	15 August	St Mirren	A	2–2		30,000
G1	22 August	Queen of the South	H	2–1		25,000
G1	26 August	Falkirk	H	2–1		20,000
G1	29 August	St Mirren	H	3–2		22,000

==== Group 1 final table ====
P	Team	Pld	W	D	L	GF	GA	GD	Pts
1	Hibernian	6	5	1	0	17	7	10	11
2	Falkirk	6	2	2	2	12	9	3	6
3	St Mirren	6	1	3	2	9	10	–1	5
4	Queen of the South	6	0	1	5	5	17	–12	2

==== Knockout stage ====
Round	Date	Opponent	H/A	Score	Hibernian Scorer(s)	Attendance
QF L1	12 September	Third Lanark	A	4–0		15,800
QF L2	16 September	Third Lanark	H	4–0		12,000
SF	10 October	East Fife	N	2–3		38,000

=== Scottish Cup ===
Round	Date	Opponent	H/A	Score	Hibernian Scorer(s)	Attendance
R1	30 January	St Johnstone	A	2–1		16,693
R2	13 February	Clyde	H	7–0		19,765
R3	27 February	Aberdeen	H	1–3		47,682

== See also ==
- List of Hibernian F.C. seasons
