= 1950–51 Hibernian F.C. season =

Hibernian
1950–51 season
- Manager: Hugh Shaw
- Scottish First Division: 1st
- Scottish Cup: SF
- Scottish League Cup: Runners-up
- Highest home attendance: 44,976 (v Heart of Midlothian, 23 September)
- Lowest home attendance: 9,000 (v Dundee, 2 December)
- Average home league attendance: 26,332 (down 1,491)

During the 1950–51 season Hibernian, a football club based in Edinburgh, came first out of 16 clubs in the Scottish First Division.

== Scottish First Division ==
Match Day	Date	Opponent	H/A	Score	Hibernian Scorer(s)	Attendance
1	9 September	Falkirk	H	6–0		23,000
2	23 September	Heart of Midlothian	H	0–1		44,976
3	30 September	Aberdeen	A	1–2		15,000
4	14 October	Motherwell	A	6–2		25,000
5	4 November	Rangers	A	1–1		80,000
6	11 November	Morton	H	2–0		30,000
7	18 November	East Fife	A	2–1		18,000
8	25 November	Airdireonians	H	5–0		22,000
9	2 December	Dundee	H	2–0		9,000
10	9 December	Third Lanark	A	2–1		25,000
11	16 December	St Mirren	H	3–1		15,000
12	23 December	Falkirk	A	5–1		14,000
13	30 December	Clyde	H	1–0		20,000
14	1 January	Heart of Midlothian	A	1–2		41,832
14	2 January	Aberdeen	H	6–2		40,000
15	6 January	Raith Rovers	A	3–1		21,000
17	13 January	Motherwell	H	3–1		42,000
18	20 January	Partick Thistle	H	1–1		23,000
19	3 February	Celtic	A	1–0		60,000
20	17 February	Morton	A	4–2		14,000
21	24 February	East Fife	H	2–0		22,000
22	3 March	Airdrieonians	A	1–2		20,000
23	17 March	Third Lanark	H	3–1		22,000
24	24 March	St Mirren	A	1–0		25,000
25	7 April	Dundee	A	2–2		21,000
26	11 April	Clyde	A	4–0		6,000
27	21 April	Partick Thistle	A	0–0		18,000
28	25 April	Raith Rovers	H	3–0		20,000
29	28 April	Rangers	H	4–1		40,000
30	30 April	Celtic	H	3–1		22,000

=== Final League table ===
P	Team	Pld	W	D	L	GF	GA	GD	Pts
1	Hibernian	30	22	4	4	78	26	52	48
2	Rangers	30	17	4	9	64	37	27	38
3	Dundee	30	15	8	7	72	45	27	37

=== Scottish League Cup ===
==== Group stage ====
Round	Date	Opponent	H/A	Score	Hibernian Scorer(s)	Attendance
G2	12 August	Dundee	H	2–0		42,000
G2	15 August	St Mirren	A	6–0		25,000
G2	19 August	Falkirk	A	5–4		18,000
G2	26 August	Dundee	A	2–0		25,500
G2	30 August	St Mirren	H	5–0		28,000
G2	2 September	Falkirk	H	4–0		25,000

==== Group 2 final table ====
P	Team	Pld	W	D	L	GF	GA	GD	Pts
1	Hibernian	6	6	0	0	24	4	20	12
2	St Mirren	6	2	1	3	7	16	–9	5
3	Dundee	6	2	0	4	7	11	–4	4
4	Falkirk	6	1	1	4	8	15	–7	3

==== Knockout stage ====
Round	Date	Opponent	H/A	Score	Hibernian Scorer(s)	Attendance
QF L1	16 September	Aberdeen	A	1–4		42,000
QF L2	20 September	Aberdeen	H	4–1		42,000
QF R	2 October	Aberdeen	A	1–1		52,000
QF 2R	3 October	Aberdeen	N	5–1		50,000
SF	7 October	Queen of the South	N	3–1		38,000
F	28 October	Motherwell	N	0–3		63,181

=== Scottish Cup ===
Round	Date	Opponent	H/A	Score	Hibernian Scorer(s)	Attendance
R1	27 January	St Mirren	A	1–1		28,000
R1 R	31 January	St Mirren	H	5–0		26,099
R2	10 February	Rangers	A	3–2		102,342
R3	10 March	Airdrieonians	A	3–0		24,000
SF	31 March	Motherwell	N	2–3		46,000

== See also ==
- List of Hibernian F.C. seasons
