= 1949–50 Hibernian F.C. season =

Hibernian
1949–50 season
- Manager: Hugh Shaw
- Scottish First Division: 2nd
- Scottish Cup: SF
- Scottish League Cup: Runners-up
- Highest home attendance: 65,840 (v Heart of Midlothian, 2 January)
- Lowest home attendance: 4,000 (v Partick Thistle, 22 October)
- Average home league attendance: 27,823 (up 2,157)

During the 1949–50 season Hibernian, a football club based in Edinburgh, came second out of 16 clubs in the Scottish First Division.

== Scottish First Division ==
Match Day	Date	Opponent	H/A	Score	Hibernian Scorer(s)	Attendance
1	10 September	Raith Rovers	A	6–0		23,000
2	24 September	Heart of Midlothian	A	2–5		37,730
3	1 October	Aberdeen	H	2–0		22,000
4	15 October	Queen of the South	H	2–0		25,000
5	22 October	Partick Thistle	H	2–0		4,000
6	29 October	Celtic	A	2–2		45,000
7	5 November	Rangers	H	1–0		51,500
8	12 November	Motherwell	A	3–1		7,000
9	19 November	East Fife	H	4–1		30,000
10	26 November	Third Lanark	A	2–0		8,000
11	3 December	Dundee	A	2–1		28,000
12	10 December	Falkirk	H	5–1		20,000
13	17 December	St Mirren	A	3–1		10,000
14	24 December	Raith Rovers	H	4–2		20,000
14	31 December	Clyde	A	1–0		20,000
15	2 January	Heart of Midlothian	H	1–2		65,840
17	3 January	Aberdeen	A	3–0		15,000
18	7 January	Stirling Albion	H	4–1		27,000
19	14 January	Queen of the South	A	2–2		10,500
20	21 January	Partick Thistle	A	2–2		30,000
21	4 February	Celtic	H	4–1		41,000
22	18 February	Motherwell	H	6–1		25,000
23	25 February	East Fife	A	1–1		15,000
24	4 March	Third Lanark	H	0–1		8,000
25	11 March	Dundee	H	4–2		33,000
26	18 March	Falkirk	A	2–1		10,000
27	25 March	St Mirren	H	5–0		25,000
28	1 April	Stirling Albion	A	5–3		12,000
29	8 April	Clyde	H	6–3		20,000
30	29 April	Rangers	A	0–0		115,000

=== Final League table ===
P	Team	Pld	W	D	L	GF	GA	GD	Pts
1	Rangers	30	22	6	2	58	26	32	50
2	Hibernian	30	22	5	3	86	34	52	49
3	Heart of Midlothian	30	20	3	7	86	40	46	43

=== Scottish League Cup ===
==== Group stage ====
Round	Date	Opponent	H/A	Score	Hibernian Scorer(s)	Attendance
G2	13 August	Falkirk	H	1–0		36,000
G2	17 August	Third Lanark	A	2–0		25,000
G2	20 August	Queen of the South	A	2–1		15,000
G2	27 August	Falkirk	A	1–2		16,000
G2	31 August	Third Lanark	H	4–2		35,000
G2	3 September	Queen of the South	H	5–3		22,000

==== Group 2 final table ====
P	Team	Pld	W	D	L	GF	GA	GD	Pts
1	Hibernian	6	5	0	1	15	8	7	10
2	Third Lanark	6	3	1	2	12	10	2	7
3	Falkirk	6	2	1	3	4	7	–3	5
4	Queen of the South	6	0	2	4	7	13	–6	2

==== Knockout stage ====
Round	Date	Opponent	H/A	Score	Hibernian Scorer(s)	Attendance
QF L1	17 September	Partick Thistle	A	2–4		30,000
QF L2	21 September	Partick Thistle	H	4–0		35,000
SF	8 October	Dunfermline Athletic	N	1–2		31,633

=== Scottish Cup ===
Round	Date	Opponent	H/A	Score	Hibernian Scorer(s)	Attendance
R1	28 January	Partick Thistle	H	0–1		26,620

== See also ==
- List of Hibernian F.C. seasons
