= 1954–55 Hibernian F.C. season =

Hibernian
1954–55 season
- Manager: Hugh Shaw
- Scottish First Division: 5th
- Scottish Cup: R5
- Scottish League Cup: GS
- Highest home attendance: 42,000 (v Heart of Midlothian, 18 September)
- Lowest home attendance: 15,000 (v Queen of the South, 21 August) (v Clyde, 29 January) (v East Fife, 19 March) (v Queen of the South, 16 April)
- Average home league attendance: 22,825 (up 805)

During the 1954–55 season Hibernian, a football club based in Edinburgh, came fifth out of 16 clubs in the Scottish First Division.

== Scottish First Division ==
Match Day	Date	Opponent	H/A	Score	Hibernian Scorer(s)	Attendance
1	11 September	Rangers	A	1–1		54,000
2	18 September	Heart of Midlothian	H	2–3		42,000
3	25 September	Aberdeen	A	1–3		26,000
4	2 October	Falkirk	H	0–1		20,000
5	9 October	Queen of the South	A	2–0		8,500
6	16 October	Raith Rovers	H	2–1		20,000
7	23 October	Clyde	A	3–6		12,000
8	30 October	Kilmarnock	H	3–2		27,500
9	6 November	Stirling Albion	A	4–2		7,000
10	13 November	Motherwell	H	4–1		16,000
11	20 November	Dundee	H	3–1		23,000
12	27 November	East Fife	A	5–1		9,000
13	4 December	St Mirren	H	2–1		22,000
14	11 December	Celtic	H	0–5		33,000
14	18 December	Partick Thistle	A	3–0		8,500
15	25 December	Rangers	H	2–1		43,000
17	1 January	Heart of Midlothian	A	1–5		49,000
18	3 January	Aberdeen	H	0–1		34,000
19	8 January	Falkirk	A	1–3		15,000
20	29 January	Clyde	H	2–3		15,000
21	12 February	Kilmarnock	A	3–0		19,059
22	9 March	Motherwell	A	5–1		7,000
23	12 March	Dundee	A	2–2		18,000
24	19 March	East Fife	H	4–1		15,000
25	23 March	Stirling Albion	H	2–2		875
26	26 March	St Mirren	A	2–4		10,000
27	2 April	Celtic	A	2–1		31,000
28	9 April	Partick Thistle	H	3–1		16,000
29	16 April	Queen of the South	H	1–1		15,000
30	30 April	Raith Rovers	A	1–2		8,000

=== Final League table ===
P	Team	Pld	W	D	L	GF	GA	GD	Pts
4	Heart of Midlothian	30	16	7	7	74	45	29	39
5	Hibernian	30	15	4	11	64	54	10	34
6	St Mirren	30	12	8	10	55	54	1	32

=== Scottish League Cup ===
==== Group stage ====
Round	Date	Opponent	H/A	Score	Hibernian Scorer(s)	Attendance
G2	14 August	East Fife	A	1–3		15,000
G2	18 August	Aberdeen	H	2–0		23,000
G2	21 August	Queen of the South	H	3–1		15,000
G2	28 August	East Fife	H	1–2		32,000
G2	1 September	Aberdeen	A	1–1		25,000
G2	4 September	Queen of the South	A	5–3		9,000

==== Group 2 final table ====
P	Team	Pld	W	D	L	GF	GA	GD	Pts
1	East Fife	6	4	0	2	13	11	2	8
2	Aberdeen	6	3	1	2	13	7	4	7
3	Hibernian	6	3	1	2	13	10	3	7
4	Queen of the South	6	1	0	5	8	19	–11	2

=== Scottish Cup ===
Round	Date	Opponent	H/A	Score	Hibernian Scorer(s)	Attendance
R5	5 February	Heart of Midlothian	A	0–5		45,770

== See also ==
- List of Hibernian F.C. seasons
