= 1948–49 Hibernian F.C. season =

Hibernian
1948–49 season
- Manager: Hugh Shaw
- Scottish First Division: 2nd
- Scottish Cup: R3
- Scottish League Cup: GS
- Highest home attendance: 50,000 (v Rangers, 19 February)
- Lowest home attendance: 5325 (v Albion Rovers, 29 January)
- Average home league attendance: 25,666 (up 278)

During the 1948–49 season Hibernian, a football club based in Edinburgh, came third out of 16 clubs in the Scottish First Division.

== Scottish First Division ==
Match Day	Date	Opponent	H/A	Score	Hibernian Scorer(s)	Attendance
1	14 August	East Fife	H	5–2		40,000
2	18 August	Queen of the South	A	1–1		14,500
3	21 August	Heart of Midlothian	H	3–1		40,000
4	28 August	Clyde	A	5–3		25,000
5	1 September	Albion Rovers	H	4–4		15,000
6	4 September	Aberdeen	A	2–1		35,000
7	23 October	Partick Thistle	A	6–2		25,000
8	30 October	Celtic	H	1–2		32,000
9	6 November	Rangers	A	4–2		50,000
10	13 November	Morton	H	3–4		22,000
11	20 November	Motherwell	A	1–5		12,000
12	27 November	Third Lanark	H	1–0		25,000
13	4 December	Dundee	A	2–1		32,000
14	11 December	Falkirk	A	1–1		20,000
14	18 December	St Mirren	H	1–1		25,000
15	25 December	Queen of the South	H	1–1		25,000
17	1 January	Heart of Midlothian	A	2–3		45,030
18	3 January	Clyde	H	3–0		30,000
19	8 January	East Fife	A	3–2		18,000
20	15 January	Aberdeen	H	4–1		24,000
21	29 January	Albion Rovers	H	3–0		8,000
22	12 February	Celtic	A	2–1		40,000
23	19 February	Rangers	H	0–1		50,000
24	26 February	Morton	A	3–2		10,000
25	19 March	Dundee	A	3–4		32,500
26	2 April	St Mirren	A	0–2		10,000
27	9 April	Partick Thistle	H	2–1		14,000
28	16 April	Motherwell	H	5–1		25,000
29	19 April	Third Lanark	A	2–3		7,000
30	23 April	Falkirk	H	2–0		10,000

=== Final League table ===
P	Team	Pld	W	D	L	GF	GA	GD	Pts
2	Dundee	30	20	5	5	71	48	23	45
3	Hibernian	30	17	5	8	75	52	27	39
4	East Fife	30	16	3	11	64	46	18	35

=== Scottish League Cup ===
==== Group stage ====
Round	Date	Opponent	H/A	Score	Hibernian Scorer(s)	Attendance
G1	11 September	Celtic	A	0–1		55,000
G1	18 September	Rangers	H	0–0		47,000
G1	25 September	Clyde	H	4–0		25,000
G1	2 October	Celtic	H	4–2		53,000
G1	9 October	Rangers	A	0–1		74,466
G1	16 October	Clyde	A	4–1		18,000

==== Group 1 final table ====
P	Team	Pld	W	D	L	GF	GA	GD	Pts
1	Rangers	6	3	2	1	8	6	2	8
2	Hibernian	6	3	1	2	12	5	7	7
3	Celtic	6	3	0	3	12	13	–1	6
4	Clyde	6	1	1	4	9	17	–8	3

=== Scottish Cup ===
Round	Date	Opponent	H/A	Score	Hibernian Scorer(s)	Attendance
R1	22 January	Forfar Athletic	A	4–0		5,347
R2	5 February	Raith Rovers	H	1–1		26,538
R2 R	9 February	Raith Rovers	A	4–3		20,000
R3	5 March	East Fife	H	0–2		24,946

== See also ==
- List of Hibernian F.C. seasons
