= 1955–56 Scottish Division One =

50th season of top-tier football league in Scotland

Scottish Division One
- Season: 1955–56
- Champions: Rangers
- Relegated: Clyde; Stirling Albion

The 1955–56 Scottish Division One was won by Rangers by six points over nearest rival Aberdeen. Clyde and Stirling Albion finished 17th and 18th respectively and were relegated to the 1956–57 Scottish Division Two.

== League reconstruction ==
Following league reconstruction, League Division One (known until then as Division A) was expanded from 16 to 18 teams this season with Airdrieonians and Dunfermline Athletic being promoted from the previous season with all Division A teams staying up.

== League table ==
Pos	Team	Pld	W	D	L	GF	GA	GR	Pts
1	Rangers	34	22	8	4	85	27	3.148	52
2	Aberdeen	34	18	10	6	87	50	1.740	46
3	Heart of Midlothian	34	19	7	8	99	47	2.106	45
4	Hibernian	34	19	7	8	86	50	1.720	45
5	Celtic	34	16	9	9	55	39	1.410	41
6	Queen of the South	34	16	5	13	69	73	0.945	37
7	Airdrieonians	34	14	8	12	85	96	0.885	36
8	Kilmarnock	34	12	10	12	52	45	1.156	34
9	Partick Thistle	34	13	7	14	62	60	1.033	33
10	Motherwell	34	11	11	12	53	59	0.898	33
11	Raith Rovers	34	12	9	13	58	75	0.773	33
12	East Fife	34	13	5	16	61	69	0.884	31
13	Dundee	34	12	6	16	56	65	0.862	30
14	Falkirk	34	11	6	17	58	75	0.773	28
15	St Mirren	34	10	7	17	57	70	0.814	27
16	Dunfermline Athletic	34	10	6	18	42	82	0.512	26
17	Clyde	34	8	6	20	50	74	0.676	22
18	Stirling Albion	34	4	5	25	23	82	0.280	13

Source: RSSSF

== Results ==
Home \ Away	ABE	AIR	CEL	CLY	DND	DNF	EFI	FAL	HOM	HIB	KIL	MOT	PAR	QOS	RAI	RAN	STM	STI
Aberdeen		7–2	1–0	1–4	2–0	1–0	7–3	2–2	4–1	6–2	3–2	1–1	0–4	3–2	3–5	0–0	4–1	7–0
Airdrieonians	2–2		1–2	1–8	3–3	1–2	1–0	4–2	1–4	3–1	3–2	3–0	3–3	3–3	4–3	0–4	4–2	4–0
Celtic	1–1	3–1		4–1	1–0	4–2	0–0	1–0	1–1	0–3	0–2	2–2	5–1	1–3	2–0	0–1	3–0	3–0
Clyde	0–5	2–3	1–3		4–1	1–2	0–1	1–2	2–2	2–2	1–3	1–3	1–1	1–3	1–3	0–4	1–1	2–1
Dundee	2–4	1–3	1–2	2–1		3–0	1–0	0–0	0–2	3–2	1–1	2–1	3–0	3–0	6–3	0–3	5–1	2–1
Dunfermline Athletic	2–2	3–7	1–1	4–1	2–1		2–3	1–5	1–5	2–1	0–3	1–0	1–1	0–1	3–2	1–0	2–3	0–0
East Fife	1–1	8–1	3–0	1–1	5–4	3–1		6–1	1–4	1–2	2–1	0–2	1–0	3–1	3–0	2–1	1–1	2–0
Falkirk	3–6	1–4	3–1	1–2	3–1	0–1	6–3		1–1	2–0	0–0	3–4	2–1	1–0	3–1	1–2	5–1	2–0
Heart of Midlothian	3–0	4–1	2–1	5–1	4–0	5–0	3–1	8–3		0–1	0–2	7–1	5–0	2–2	7–2	1–1	4–1	5–0
Hibernian	1–3	3–3	2–3	1–0	6–3	7–1	3–1	2–0	2–2		2–1	7–0	5–1	4–1	2–2	2–2	2–0	6–1
Kilmarnock	1–0	2–1	0–0	1–0	0–0	3–0	3–0	4–4	2–4	0–1		2–1	0–1	2–2	1–1	1–2	1–1	3–2
Motherwell	1–1	0–2	2–2	2–2	1–2	2–1	5–2	0–0	1–0	1–1	2–1		3–1	1–2	5–1	1–2	1–1	2–0
Partick Thistle	0–2	1–3	2–0	1–0	1–2	1–1	2–2	3–2	2–0	1–1	1–1	2–1		9–1	1–2	1–3	2–0	6–1
Queen of the South	2–2	5–3	1–3	5–2	2–1	3–0	2–1	6–0	4–3	1–3	2–0	0–0	3–2		0–1	2–1	4–1	4–2
Raith Rovers	1–1	3–3	1–1	1–3	1–1	1–1	4–0	2–0	1–1	0–1	2–1	4–3	2–3	3–1		0–5	2–2	2–0
Rangers	1–0	4–4	0–0	0–1	3–1	6–0	3–0	4–0	4–1	4–1	3–2	2–2	1–0	6–0	4–0		4–1	0–0
St Mirren	0–3	7–2	0–2	3–0	3–1	4–2	4–0	2–0	3–1	0–1	2–2	1–1	1–3	4–1	0–1	0–1		5–2
Stirling Albion	0–2	1–1	0–3	1–2	0–0	1–2	2–1	1–0	0–2	0–3	1–2	0–1	2–4	2–0	0–1	2–2	2–1	

Legend: Blue = home team win; Yellow = draw; Red = away team win.
