= 1952–53 Scottish League Cup =

Tournament details
- Country: Scotland

Final positions
- Champions: Dundee
- Runners-up: Kilmarnock

The 1952–53 Scottish League Cup was the seventh season of Scotland's second football knockout competition. The competition was won by Dundee for a second successive season, who defeated Kilmarnock in the Final.

== First round ==
=== Group 1 ===
Team	Pld	W	D	L	GF	GA	GR	Pts
Hibernian	6	4	0	2	17	9	1.889	8
Celtic	6	4	0	2	9	9	1.000	8
St Mirren	6	2	1	3	13	13	1.000	5
Partick Thistle	6	1	1	4	10	18	0.556	3

Home team	Score	Away team	Date
Partick Thistle	1–5	Hibernian	9 August 1952
St Mirren	0–1	Celtic	9 August 1952
Celtic	2–5	Partick Thistle	13 August 1952
Hibernian	5–2	St Mirren	13 August 1952
Celtic	2–0	Hibernian	16 August 1952
St Mirren	5–1	Partick Thistle	16 August 1952
Celtic	3–1	St Mirren	23 August 1952
Hibernian	3–1	Partick Thistle	23 August 1952
Partick Thistle	0–1	Celtic	27 August 1952
St Mirren	3–1	Hibernian	27 August 1952
Hibernian	3–0	Celtic	30 August 1952
Partick Thistle	2–2	St Mirren	30 August 1952

=== Group 2 ===
Team	Pld	W	D	L	GF	GA	GR	Pts
Third Lanark	6	4	0	2	12	7	1.714	8
East Fife	6	3	1	2	12	9	1.333	7
Falkirk	6	2	2	2	14	15	0.933	6
Queen of the South	6	1	1	4	8	15	0.533	3

Home team	Score	Away team	Date
East Fife	2–0	Queen of the South	9 August 1952
Third Lanark	2–4	Falkirk	9 August 1952
Falkirk	3–3	East Fife	13 August 1952
Queen of the South	0–3	Third Lanark	13 August 1952
East Fife	0–1	Third Lanark	16 August 1952
Queen of the South	2–2	Falkirk	16 August 1952
Falkirk	2–1	Third Lanark	23 August 1952
Queen of the South	2–3	East Fife	23 August 1952
East Fife	4–1	Falkirk	27 August 1952
Third Lanark	3–1	Queen of the South	27 August 1952
Falkirk	2–3	Queen of the South	30 August 1952
Third Lanark	2–0	East Fife	30 August 1952

=== Group 3 ===
Team	Pld	W	D	L	GF	GA	GR	Pts
Rangers	6	4	1	1	12	10	1.200	9
Heart of Midlothian	6	3	1	2	12	7	1.714	7
Motherwell	6	3	1	2	11	9	1.222	7
Aberdeen	6	0	1	5	7	16	0.438	1

Home team	Score	Away team	Date
Heart of Midlothian	5–0	Rangers	9 August 1952
Motherwell	5–2	Aberdeen	9 August 1952
Aberdeen	2–4	Heart of Midlothian	13 August 1952
Rangers	2–0	Motherwell	13 August 1952
Heart of Midlothian	0–1	Motherwell	16 August 1952
Rangers	3–1	Aberdeen	16 August 1952
Aberdeen	0–1	Motherwell	23 August 1952
Rangers	2–0	Heart of Midlothian	23 August 1952
Heart of Midlothian	1–1	Aberdeen	27 August 1952
Motherwell	3–3	Rangers	27 August 1952
Aberdeen	1–2	Rangers	30 August 1952
Motherwell	1–2	Heart of Midlothian	30 August 1952

=== Group 4 ===
Team	Pld	W	D	L	GF	GA	GR	Pts
Dundee	6	4	2	0	15	10	1.500	10
Clyde	6	1	3	2	15	15	1.000	5
Raith Rovers	6	2	1	3	9	14	0.643	5
Airdrieonians	6	1	2	3	9	9	1.000	4

Home team	Score	Away team	Date
Clyde	1–1	Airdrieonians	9 August 1952
Dundee	2–1	Raith Rovers	9 August 1952
Airdrieonians	1–3	Dundee	13 August 1952
Raith Rovers	4–3	Clyde	13 August 1952
Airdrieonians	0–1	Raith Rovers	16 August 1952
Dundee	2–2	Clyde	16 August 1952
Airdrieonians	4–0	Clyde	23 August 1952
Raith Rovers	1–2	Dundee	23 August 1952
Clyde	6–1	Raith Rovers	27 August 1952
Dundee	3–2	Airdrieonians	27 August 1952
Clyde	3–3	Dundee	30 August 1952
Raith Rovers	1–1	Airdrieonians	30 August 1952

=== Group 5 ===
Team	Pld	W	D	L	GF	GA	GR	Pts
Kilmarnock	6	5	0	1	15	8	1.875	10
Dunfermline Athletic	6	3	1	2	19	13	1.462	7
Alloa Athletic	6	1	2	3	10	12	0.833	4
Arbroath	6	1	1	4	5	16	0.313	3

Home team	Score	Away team	Date
Arbroath	0–5	Dunfermline Athletic	9 August 1952
Kilmarnock	3–1	Alloa Athletic	9 August 1952
Alloa Athletic	3–1	Arbroath	13 August 1952
Dunfermline Athletic	3–4	Kilmarnock	13 August 1952
Alloa Athletic	2–2	Dunfermline Athletic	16 August 1952
Arbroath	2–0	Kilmarnock	16 August 1952
Alloa Athletic	0–1	Kilmarnock	23 August 1952
Dunfermline Athletic	3–1	Arbroath	23 August 1952
Arbroath	1–1	Alloa Athletic	27 August 1952
Kilmarnock	3–2	Dunfermline Athletic	27 August 1952
Dunfermline Athletic	4–3	Alloa Athletic	30 August 1952
Kilmarnock	4–0	Arbroath	30 August 1952

=== Group 6 ===
Team	Pld	W	D	L	GF	GA	GR	Pts
Stirling Albion	6	5	0	1	20	6	3.333	10
Ayr United	6	2	1	3	18	9	2.000	5
Dumbarton	6	2	1	3	7	18	0.389	5
Dundee United	6	2	0	4	8	20	0.400	4

Home team	Score	Away team	Date
Dumbarton	3–1	Dundee United	9 August 1952
Stirling Albion	2–0	Ayr United	9 August 1952
Ayr United	11–1	Dumbarton	13 August 1952
Dundee United	2–6	Stirling Albion	13 August 1952
Ayr United	4–1	Dundee United	16 August 1952
Stirling Albion	3–0	Dumbarton	16 August 1952
Ayr United	1–2	Stirling Albion	23 August 1952
Dundee United	1–0	Dumbarton	23 August 1952
Dumbarton	1–1	Ayr United	27 August 1952
Stirling Albion	6–1	Dundee United	27 August 1952
Dumbarton	2–1	Stirling Albion	30 August 1952
Dundee United	2–1	Ayr United	30 August 1952

=== Group 7 ===
Team	Pld	W	D	L	GF	GA	GR	Pts
Morton	6	5	1	0	19	9	2.111	11
Hamilton Academical	6	2	2	2	9	10	0.900	6
Forfar Athletic	6	1	2	3	8	13	0.615	4
Cowdenbeath	6	1	1	4	7	11	0.636	3

Home team	Score	Away team	Date
Cowdenbeath	2–0	Forfar Athletic	9 August 1952
Morton	4–1	Hamilton Academical	9 August 1952
Forfar Athletic	0–2	Morton	13 August 1952
Hamilton Academical	2–0	Cowdenbeath	13 August 1952
Cowdenbeath	2–3	Morton	16 August 1952
Hamilton Academical	2–2	Forfar Athletic	16 August 1952
Forfar Athletic	3–1	Cowdenbeath	23 August 1952
Hamilton Academical	2–3	Morton	23 August 1952
Cowdenbeath	0–1	Hamilton Academical	27 August 1952
Morton	5–2	Forfar Athletic	27 August 1952
Forfar Athletic	1–1	Hamilton Academical	30 August 1952
Morton	2–2	Cowdenbeath	30 August 1952

=== Group 8 ===
Team	Pld	W	D	L	GF	GA	GR	Pts
St Johnstone	6	4	1	1	19	10	1.900	9
Queen's Park	6	3	1	2	8	7	1.143	7
Stenhousemuir	6	2	1	3	8	12	0.667	5
Albion Rovers	6	1	1	4	11	17	0.647	3

Home team	Score	Away team	Date
Albion Rovers	2–0	Queen's Park	9 August 1952
Stenhousemuir	1–5	St Johnstone	9 August 1952
Queen's Park	1–2	Stenhousemuir	13 August 1952
St Johnstone	6–3	Albion Rovers	13 August 1952
Queen's Park	0–0	St Johnstone	16 August 1952
Stenhousemuir	1–0	Albion Rovers	16 August 1952
Queen's Park	2–0	Albion Rovers	23 August 1952
St Johnstone	1–0	Stenhousemuir	23 August 1952
Albion Rovers	2–4	St Johnstone	27 August 1952
Stenhousemuir	0–1	Queen's Park	27 August 1952
Albion Rovers	4–4	Stenhousemuir	30 August 1952
St Johnstone	3–4	Queen's Park	30 August 1952

== Quarter-finals ==
=== First leg ===
Home team	Score	Away team	Date
Morton	0–6	Hibernian	13 September 1952
Rangers	0–0	Third Lanark	13 September 1952
St Johnstone	1–3	Kilmarnock	13 September 1952
Stirling Albion	3–1	Dundee	13 September 1952

=== Second leg ===
Home team	Score	Away team	Date	Agg
Dundee	5–0	Stirling Albion	17 September 1952	6–3
Hibernian	6–3	Morton	17 September 1952	12–3
Kilmarnock	4–1	St Johnstone	17 September 1952	7–2
Third Lanark	0–2	Rangers	17 September 1952	0–2

== Semi-finals ==
Home team	Score	Away team	Date
Dundee	2–1	Hibernian	4 October 1952
Kilmarnock	1–0	Rangers	4 October 1952

== Final ==
25 October 1952

Dundee	2–0	Kilmarnock
Flavell

Hampden Park, Glasgow
Attendance: 51,830
