= 1950–51 Scottish Division A =

45th season of top-tier football league in Scotland

Scottish Division A
- Season: 1950–51
- Champions: Hibernian
- Relegated: Clyde; Falkirk

The 1950–51 Scottish Division A was won by Hibernian by ten points over nearest rival Rangers. Clyde and Falkirk finished 15th and 16th respectively and were relegated to the 1951–52 Scottish Division B.

== League table ==
Pos	Team	Pld	W	D	L	GF	GA	GD	Pts
1	Hibernian	30	22	4	4	78	26	+52	48
2	Rangers	30	17	4	9	64	37	+27	38
3	Dundee	30	15	8	7	47	30	+17	38
4	Heart of Midlothian	30	16	5	9	72	45	+27	37
5	Aberdeen	30	15	5	10	61	50	+11	35
6	Partick Thistle	30	13	7	10	57	48	+9	33
7	Celtic	30	12	5	13	48	46	+2	29
8	Raith Rovers	30	13	2	15	52	52	0	28
9	Motherwell	30	11	6	13	58	65	−7	28
10	East Fife	30	10	8	12	48	66	−18	28
11	St Mirren	30	9	7	14	35	51	−16	25
12	Morton	30	10	4	16	47	59	−12	24
13	Third Lanark	30	11	2	17	40	51	−11	24
14	Airdrieonians	30	10	4	16	52	67	−15	24
15	Clyde	30	8	7	15	37	57	−20	23
16	Falkirk	30	7	4	19	35	81	−46	18

Source: RSSSF

== Results ==
Home \ Away	ABE	AIR	CEL	CLY	DND	EFI	FAL	HOM	HIB	MOR	MOT	PAR	RAI	RAN	STM	THI
Aberdeen		1–1	2–1	5–3	1–0	1–2	5–1	2–0	2–1	3–0	4–2	4–1	1–2	2–4	1–1	1–2
Airdrieonians	2–5		2–4	3–3	2–0	2–2	1–1	2–3	2–1	2–0	2–3	1–2	2–5	2–1	2–0	2–1
Celtic	3–4	0–1		1–0	0–0	6–2	3–0	2–2	0–1	3–4	3–1	0–3	2–3	3–2	2–1	1–1
Clyde	0–2	2–2	1–3		2–1	1–1	3–1	2–2	0–4	1–1	1–2	1–0	1–0	2–1	2–1	0–2
Dundee	2–0	3–0	3–1	1–1		2–4	2–0	1–0	2–2	2–1	0–0	3–2	2–0	2–0	5–0	2–1
East Fife	0–0	4–1	3–0	2–1	1–3		2–1	1–4	1–2	3–3	3–2	1–1	3–1	0–3	1–1	3–1
Falkirk	1–1	4–1	0–2	1–0	2–1	1–1		5–4	1–5	0–1	2–4	2–1	2–3	1–1	0–2	2–0
Heart of Midlothian	4–1	2–0	1–1	4–0	1–1	5–1	4–2		2–1	8–0	3–3	4–5	3–1	0–1	1–0	4–0
Hibernian	6–2	5–0	3–1	1–0	2–0	2–0	6–0	0–1		2–0	3–1	1–1	3–0	4–1	3–1	3–1
Morton	1–2	4–1	0–2	1–4	2–3	4–2	0–1	0–1	2–4		5–0	3–2	2–0	0–2	5–2	1–3
Motherwell	1–1	1–2	2–1	1–1	0–2	4–2	4–0	2–4	2–6	1–1		4–1	3–2	2–3	4–0	4–1
Partick Thistle	1–4	2–0	0–1	2–1	1–1	4–0	4–1	5–2	0–0	1–0	1–1		5–2	2–1	1–1	1–0
Raith Rovers	1–0	0–1	1–2	4–1	0–1	3–0	3–0	2–0	1–3	1–1	3–4	2–2		3–1	2–0	4–0
Rangers	1–2	4–1	1–0	4–0	0–0	5–0	5–2	2–1	1–1	2–0	3–0	1–3	4–1		1–1	2–1
St Mirren	4–2	3–2	0–0	3–1	2–2	1–2	0–0	1–0	0–1	1–3	3–0	2–1	2–0	0–2		0–4
Third Lanark	2–0	1–0	2–0	1–2	2–0	1–1	2–1	1–2	1–2	0–2	2–0	4–2	1–2	1–5	1–2	

Legend: Blue = home team win; Yellow = draw; Red = away team win.
