= 1951–52 Scottish Division A =

46th season of top-tier football league in Scotland

Scottish Division A
- Season: 1951–52
- Champions: Hibernian
- Relegated: Greenock Morton; Stirling Albion

The 1951–52 Scottish Division A was won by Hibernian by four points over nearest rival Rangers. Greenock Morton and Stirling Albion finished 15th and 16th respectively and were relegated to the 1952–53 Scottish Division B.

This was the first time in the history of the Scottish top tier that a team other than Celtic or Rangers managed to successfully defend their league trophy and won two leagues in a row, a feature only repeated since by Aberdeen in 1984 and 1985. It was also the fourth and, as of 2025, last time that Hibernian won the league.

== League table ==
Pos	Team	Pld	W	D	L	GF	GA	GD	Pts
1	Hibernian	30	20	5	5	92	36	+56	45
2	Rangers	30	16	9	5	61	31	+30	41
3	East Fife	30	17	3	10	71	49	+22	37
4	Heart of Midlothian	30	14	7	9	69	53	+16	35
5	Raith Rovers	30	14	5	11	43	42	+1	33
6	Partick Thistle	30	12	7	11	48	51	−3	31
7	Motherwell	30	12	7	11	51	57	−6	31
8	Dundee	30	11	6	13	53	52	+1	28
9	Celtic	30	10	8	12	52	55	−3	28
10	Queen of the South	30	10	8	12	50	60	−10	28
11	Aberdeen	30	10	7	13	65	58	+7	27
12	Third Lanark	30	9	8	13	51	62	−11	26
13	Airdrieonians	30	11	4	15	54	69	−15	26
14	St Mirren	30	10	5	15	43	58	−15	25
15	Morton	30	9	6	15	49	56	−7	24
16	Stirling Albion	30	5	5	20	36	99	−63	15

Source: RSSSF

== Results ==
Home \ Away	ABE	AIR	CEL	DND	EFI	HOM	HIB	MOR	MOT	PAR	QOS	RAI	RAN	STM	STI	THI
Aberdeen		1–4	3–4	3–1	2–1	3–0	1–2	3–1	2–2	4–2	1–1	2–2	1–1	3–0	6–0	2–3
Airdrieonians	3–0		2–1	4–3	3–1	2–0	0–2	3–5	1–2	2–2	3–0	2–1	0–1	2–2	2–2	2–4
Celtic	2–0	3–1		1–1	2–1	1–3	1–1	2–2	2–2	2–1	6–1	0–1	1–4	2–1	3–1	2–2
Dundee	3–2	0–1	2–1		3–4	3–3	1–4	2–2	1–2	0–2	0–0	2–0	1–0	3–0	4–1	6–0
East Fife	2–1	3–1	3–1	3–1		2–4	3–1	4–1	6–1	1–1	5–0	0–1	2–1	3–3	4–0	3–2
Heart of Midlothian	2–2	6–1	2–1	4–2	3–1		1–1	4–1	2–2	1–2	4–3	4–2	2–2	2–1	5–2	2–2
Hibernian	4–4	4–0	3–1	3–1	4–2	2–3		1–0	3–1	5–0	5–0	5–0	1–1	5–0	8–0	5–2
Morton	3–2	2–3	0–1	3–0	0–2	3–1	2–1		0–2	1–2	2–2	1–4	0–1	3–0	7–1	3–1
Motherwell	3–3	4–1	2–2	2–1	2–1	0–5	3–1	1–2		1–1	4–0	1–3	2–1	2–0	5–2	1–1
Partick Thistle	1–4	5–2	2–4	1–3	2–0	2–0	1–2	1–1	2–1		3–0	1–1	1–3	0–0	2–1	4–2
Queen of the South	1–2	4–2	4–0	1–0	2–3	1–1	5–2	4–1	4–1	2–1		2–2	2–2	3–1	2–0	1–0
Raith Rovers	2–1	1–1	1–0	1–2	2–3	2–1	0–2	2–0	2–0	1–2	0–0		3–1	2–1	3–0	1–0
Rangers	3–2	1–0	1–1	1–2	1–1	2–0	2–2	1–0	3–0	4–1	3–2	1–0		5–1	3–0	1–1
St Mirren	3–1	2–0	3–1	1–1	0–2	1–0	0–4	1–1	3–0	1–2	3–1	3–0	0–5		4–1	3–0
Stirling Albion	0–4	3–6	2–1	2–2	3–2	0–4	1–4	1–1	2–1	2–1	1–1	1–2	1–5	0–3		3–3
Third Lanark	2–0	4–0	3–3	0–2	1–3	4–0	0–5	3–1	0–1	0–0	2–1	3–1	1–1	4–2	1–3	

Legend: Blue = home team win; Yellow = draw; Red = away team win.
