= 1952–53 Scottish Division A =

47th season of top-tier football league in Scotland

Scottish Division A
- Season: 1952–53
- Champions: Rangers
- Relegated: Motherwell; Third Lanark

The 1952–53 Scottish Division A was won by Rangers on goal average over nearest rival Hibernian. Motherwell and Third Lanark finished 15th and 16th respectively and were relegated to the 1953–54 Scottish Division B.

Rangers won the title with a 1–1 draw on the last day of the season, away to Queen of the South. Rangers equalised with 17 minutes to go and thereby won the league on goal average from Hibernian, preventing the Edinburgh club from winning a third successive title.

== League table ==
Pos	Team	Pld	W	D	L	GF	GA	GR	Pts
1	Rangers	30	18	7	5	80	39	2.051	43
2	Hibernian	30	19	5	6	93	51	1.824	43
3	East Fife	30	16	7	7	72	48	1.500	39
4	Heart of Midlothian	30	12	6	12	59	50	1.180	30
5	Clyde	30	13	4	13	78	78	1.000	30
6	St Mirren	30	11	8	11	52	58	0.897	30
7	Dundee	30	9	11	10	44	37	1.189	29
8	Celtic	30	11	7	12	51	54	0.944	29
9	Partick Thistle	30	10	9	11	55	63	0.873	29
10	Queen of the South	30	10	8	12	43	61	0.705	28
11	Aberdeen	30	11	5	14	64	68	0.941	27
12	Raith Rovers	30	9	8	13	47	53	0.887	26
13	Falkirk	30	11	4	15	53	63	0.841	26
14	Airdrieonians	30	10	6	14	53	75	0.707	26
15	Motherwell	30	10	5	15	57	80	0.713	25
16	Third Lanark	30	8	4	18	52	75	0.693	20

Source: RSSSF

== Results ==
Home \ Away	ABE	AIR	CEL	CLY	DND	EFI	FAL	HOM	HIB	MOT	PAR	QOS	RAI	RAN	STM	THI
Aberdeen		1–2	2–2	3–2	2–2	6–3	7–2	3–0	1–1	5–1	4–2	4–0	0–2	2–2	1–2	4–3
Airdrieonians	4–7		0–0	4–4	2–1	3–1	1–1	1–2	3–7	1–2	1–0	1–2	3–1	2–2	3–1	4–2
Celtic	1–3	0–1		2–4	5–0	1–1	5–3	1–1	1–3	3–0	3–1	1–1	0–1	2–1	3–2	5–4
Clyde	3–0	6–1	1–2		1–1	1–2	1–4	3–2	2–3	3–2	2–2	5–0	3–2	4–6	3–1	5–2
Dundee	3–1	0–2	4–0	4–1		1–1	2–1	2–1	2–0	0–0	6–0	0–0	2–3	1–1	0–0	3–0
East Fife	4–1	3–1	4–1	7–1	3–2		3–1	3–1	3–5	2–2	2–3	0–0	2–0	3–2	7–0	3–1
Falkirk	4–1	2–2	2–3	2–1	2–1	0–1		2–4	1–3	2–1	0–4	2–0	3–2	1–2	1–2	5–1
Heart of Midlothian	3–1	4–0	1–0	7–0	1–1	4–2	0–1		1–2	3–1	2–1	3–0	1–2	2–2	1–2	3–3
Hibernian	3–0	3–1	1–1	5–1	3–0	2–1	4–2	3–1		7–2	1–1	1–3	4–1	1–1	0–2	7–1
Motherwell	4–1	4–1	4–2	3–6	2–1	3–3	2–1	1–3	3–7		1–2	3–2	2–1	0–3	1–1	1–5
Partick Thistle	1–1	3–2	3–0	1–5	0–3	1–3	0–3	2–2	5–4	4–2		2–2	4–1	1–2	5–3	0–0
Queen of the South	4–0	1–2	2–1	3–1	1–0	0–1	2–2	4–2	2–7	3–1	0–1		1–1	1–1	4–3	3–1
Raith Rovers	2–1	3–0	1–1	3–2	1–1	0–0	0–2	1–1	4–2	1–1	2–2	1–1		3–1	0–1	3–4
Rangers	4–0	8–2	1–0	1–2	3–1	4–0	4–0	3–0	1–2	4–1	2–2	3–1	3–2		4–0	4–1
St Mirren	2–1	2–2	1–2	2–2	0–0	1–1	3–0	1–0	2–2	2–5	1–1	6–0	3–2	2–3		1–0
Third Lanark	0–1	2–1	1–3	1–3	0–0	0–3	1–1	2–3	2–0	1–2	3–1	5–0	2–1	0–2	4–3	

Legend: Blue = home team win; Yellow = draw; Red = away team win.
