= Annfield Stadium =

Stadium in Stirling, Scotland, UK

Annfield
- Location within Stirling
- Location: Stirling, Scotland
- Coordinates: 56.110611°N 3.937194°W
- Owner: Stirling Albion F.C. (1945–1981); Central Regional Council (1981–1993)
- Surface: Natural Grass (1945–1986); Synthetic Surface (1986–1993)

Construction
- Groundbreaking: 1945
- Opened: 1945
- Closed: 1993
- Demolished: 1993

Tenant
- Stirling Albion F.C. (1945–1993)

Annfield Stadium was a football stadium in Stirling, Scotland. The stadium was home to Stirling Albion F.C. for almost 50 years until 1993 when it closed after Stirling Albion moved to Forthbank Stadium.

== History ==
Before World War II, King's Park was the Scottish Football League club based in Stirling, but their Forthbank Park ground was destroyed by the Luftwaffe during the war. Rather than resurrect King's Park, a group of local businessmen led by coal merchant Tom Fergusson, decided to purchase the Annfield Estate. They formed new club called Stirling Albion. Oak trees were cleared from the estate to lay a pitch and Albion trucks were used as viewing platforms until a stand was built. Annfield opened on 1 August 1945 and the first game played at Annfield was Stirling Albion's tie with Edinburgh City on 18 August 1945, Stirling Albion won the game 8–3.

The club constructed a main east stand in 1946 and rebuilt three years later, while a west stand was built in the early 1950s. The record attendance of 26,400 was set by a 1958–59 Scottish Cup tie against Celtic. Soon after this, the club erected a roof over the northern terracing. It installed floodlights in 1961 and inaugurated with a friendly match against Birmingham City in November. During this period, the Annfield House provided the dressing rooms and club offices. In 1974, these functions moved to a new block erected behind the east stand.

On 18 May 1977, Annfield Stadium was visited by Queen Elizabeth II and Prince Philip as part of the Silver Jubilee celebrations.

On 8 December 1984, Annfield Stadium was the site of British football's biggest 20th century win as Stirling Albion beat Selkirk 20-0 in the Scottish Cup first round.

Stirling Albion sold Annfield to Central Regional Council in 1981 when it was on the verge of bankruptcy. The club's only choice to avoid insolvency was selling the ground for £250,000 to the council and then renting it for £3,000 per annum. In April 1984, the council conducted a safety assessment that resulted in condemnation of parts of the east stand. Central Regional Council decided that it would only invest further public funds in Annfield if it were more accessible to the community. This resulted in the installation of a synthetic pitch, which the Scottish Football League approved in 1987. The first match in Scottish football history played on a synthetic surface was at Annfield in September 1987, between Stirling Albion and Ayr United.

Central Regional Council spent significant funds on Annfield during the 1980s; £100,000 for new floodlights, barriers and gates in 1986 and £450,000 on the synthetic pitch. The cost of the pitch was relatively high because the sloped surface required levelling. The stadium added 600 plastic seats in the west stand in 1987, but the east stand was largely demolished resulting in a capacity of 14,000.

Central Regional Council decided in the early 1990s that Annfield should be replaced as the cost of upgrading the buildings and the pitch was not economical. The council constructed Forthbank Stadium and closed Annfield on 31 May 1993, at the end of the 1992–93 season after 48 years of use. It demolished the facility to make way for a new housing development.

== See also ==
- Stadium relocations in Scottish football
