= Hugh Shaw (footballer, born 1896) =

Scottish footballer and manager (1896–1976)

Personal information
- Date of birth: 1 April 1896
- Place of birth: Clydebank, Scotland
- Date of death: August 16, 1976 (aged 80)
- Place of death: Edinburgh, Scotland
- Position: Half-back

Senior career*
Years	Team	Apps	(Gls)
- Clydebank Juniors
1918–1926	Hibernian	235	(15)
1926–1927	Rangers	36	(2)
1927–1930	Heart of Midlothian	57	(4)
1930–1932	East Fife	29	(1)
1932	Leith Athletic	3	(0)
- Elgin City
Total		360	(23)

Managerial career
- 1948–1961: Hibernian
- 1961–1962: Raith Rovers
- * Club domestic league appearances and goals

Hugh Shaw (1 April 1896 – 16 August 1976) was a Scottish football player and manager. He played as a half-back for Hibernian, Rangers, Heart of Midlothian, East Fife and Leith Athletic in the Scottish Football League, winning a Scottish league championship with Rangers in 1927. After retiring as a player he became a coach with Hibernian, assisting manager Willie McCartney. Shaw became Hibs manager in 1948, and guided the team to league championships in 1948, 1951 and 1952. Shaw managed Hibs until 1961, and then had a brief spell as Raith Rovers manager.

== Playing career ==
Shaw played during the interwar period, making his debut for Hibernian during the 1918–19 season. He played as a left half-back in the Hibs side that reached the Scottish Cup finals of 1923 and 1924, losing to Celtic and Airdrie respectively.

Shaw left Hibs in 1926 to play for Rangers. He played in 36 league games in 1926–27 as Rangers won the Scottish league championship, but then moved to Hearts. Shaw played in a Hearts team that threatened to challenge for the league championship in 1928, but eventually finished fourth. He later played for East Fife, Leith Athletic and Elgin City.

== Coaching career ==
Shaw was hired as Hibs' trainer by Willie McCartney in 1936, after McCartney had been appointed manager. Hibs had fallen on hard times in the early 1930s, having suffered relegation for the first time in 1931 and then struggling to regain and retain Division One status. Through the late 1930s and the Second World War, McCartney built the great Hibs side that would largely dominate Scottish football in the late 1940s and early 1950s. With Hibs on top of the league midway through the 1947–48 season, however, McCartney collapsed during a Scottish Cup match and died later that night. Although Matt Busby was linked with the job, Shaw was appointed as manager within the week, as Hibs faced a match against their main challengers, Rangers. Hibs won that match 1–0 with a goal in the last minute and went on to win the league championship.

Shaw completed the Famous Five forward line by introducing Bobby Johnstone to the team in 1948, with all five playing together for the first time on 21 April 1949. He guided the team to further league championships in 1951 and 1952, while also narrowly missing out in 1950 and 1953. The team also entered the first European Cup competition in 1955–56, reaching the semi-final.

The forward line was broken by the sale of Bobby Johnstone to Manchester City in 1955, and the remaining players were starting to age. Hibs continued to do well in reserve team football, but many of those players failed to impress in the first team, with the brilliant exception of Joe Baker. Shaw took some of the blame for the failure to replace the great side, and he resigned in November 1961 following a bad start to the 1961–62 season. He then had a brief spell as Raith Rovers manager.

Shaw died in 1976. In 2003, the Sunday Herald newspaper listed Shaw as 31st in their list of the 50 greatest Scottish football managers, noting his "sense and man-management skills".

== Honours ==
=== As player ===
Rangers

- Scottish Football League: 1926–27

Hibernian

- Scottish Cup runner-up: 1922–23, 1923–24

=== As manager ===
Hibernian

- Scottish Football League: 1947–48, 1950–51, 1951–52
- *Runners-up: 1949–50, 1952–53
- Scottish Cup runner-up: 1957–58
- Scottish League Cup runner-up: 1950–51
