= List of Falkirk F.C. seasons =

Scottish football club seasons

This is a list of Falkirk Football Club seasons from 1878–79 to the present day. The list details Falkirk's record in major league and cup competitions, and the club's top league goal scorer of each season where available. Top scorers in bold were also the top scorers in Falkirk's division that season. Records of minor competitions such as the Stirlingshire Cup are not included.

The club has been runner-up of the Scottish Football League twice and won the second tier of Scottish football on eight occasions. The club has reached the final of the Scottish Cup five times, winning two, as well as winning the Scottish Challenge Cup a record four times. Falkirk has competed in a European club competition once; in 2009–10, Falkirk qualified for the inaugural season of the Europa League as runners-up of the 2008–09 Scottish Cup. Falkirk lost to FC Vaduz of Liechtenstein in the second qualifying round 2–1 on aggregate after extra time.

== Seasons ==
Season	League									Scottish Cup	League Cup	Challenge Cup	Europe	Top league goalscorer	
Season	Division	P	W	D	L	F	A	Pts	Pos	Scottish Cup	League Cup	Challenge Cup	Europe	Name	Goals
1878–79										R2	^{[note 1]}	^{[note 2]}	^{[note 3]}		
1879–80										R2	^{[note 1]}	^{[note 2]}	^{[note 3]}		
1880–81										R3	^{[note 1]}	^{[note 2]}	^{[note 3]}		
1881–82										R5	^{[note 1]}	^{[note 2]}	^{[note 3]}		
1882–83										R3	^{[note 1]}	^{[note 2]}	^{[note 3]}		
1883–84										R3	^{[note 1]}	^{[note 2]}	^{[note 3]}		
1884–85										R3	^{[note 1]}	^{[note 2]}	^{[note 3]}		
1885–86										R2	^{[note 1]}	^{[note 2]}	^{[note 3]}		
1886–87										R3	^{[note 1]}	^{[note 2]}	^{[note 3]}		
1887–88										R3	^{[note 1]}	^{[note 2]}	^{[note 3]}		
1888–89										R4	^{[note 1]}	^{[note 2]}	^{[note 3]}		
1889–90										R3	^{[note 1]}	^{[note 2]}	^{[note 3]}		
1890–91										R2	^{[note 1]}	^{[note 2]}	^{[note 3]}		
Falkirk did not compete in any major national tournaments between 1891 and 1896
1896–97										R2					
1897–98										–					
1898–99										–					
1899–1900										R1					
1900–01										–					
1901–02										QF					
1902–03	SSD	22	8	7	7	39	37	23	7th	–					
1903–04	SSD	22	11	4	7	50	34	26	4th	–					
1904–05	SSD	22	12	4	6	32	25	28	2nd	–					
1905–06	SFD	30	9	5	16	52	68	23	13th	R1					
1906–07	SFD	34	17	7	10	73	58	41	5th	R1					
1907–08	SFD	34	22	7	5	103	42	51	2nd	R1				**Jock Simpson**	**33**
1908–09	SFD	34	13	7	14	58	56	33	9th	SF					
1909–10	SFD	34	22	8	4	71	28	52	2nd	R2				**Jock Simpson**	**24**
1910–11	SFD	34	17	10	7	65	42	44	3rd	R2					
1911–12	SFD	34	15	6	13	46	43	36	7th	R2					
1912–13	SFD	34	14	12	8	56	38	40	5th	Winners					
1913–14	SFD	34	20	9	9	69	51	49	5th	R1					
1914–15	SFD	38	16	7	15	48	48	39	6th	–					
1915–16	SFD	38	12	9	17	45	61	33	12th	–					
1916–17	SFD	38	12	10	16	58	57	34	12th	–					
1917–18	SFD	34	9	9	16	38	58	27	13th	–					
1918–19	SFD	34	6	8	20	46	73	20	16th	–					
1919–20	SFD	42	10	11	21	45	74	31	20th	R2					
1920–21	SFD	42	11	12	19	54	72	34	18th	R1					
1921–22	SFD	42	16	17	9	48	38	49	5th	R2					
1922–23	SFD	38	14	17	7	44	32	45	4th	R3					
1923–24	SFD	38	13	6	19	46	53	32	15th	SF					
1924–25	SFD	38	12	8	18	44	54	32	16th	R3					
1925–26	SFD	38	14	14	10	61	57	42	8th	R3					
1926–27	SFD	38	16	10	12	77	60	42	6th	SF					
1927–28	SFD	38	16	5	17	76	69	37	10th	R3					
1928–29	SFD	38	14	8	16	68	86	36	11th	R3				**Evelyn Morrison**	**43**
1929–30	SFD	38	16	9	13	62	64	41	7th	QF					
1930–31	SFD	38	14	4	20	77	87	32	14th	R3					
1931–32	SFD	38	11	5	22	70	76	27	18th	R1					
1932–33	SFD	38	15	6	17	70	70	36	11th	R2					
1933–34	SFD	38	16	6	16	73	68	38	10th	R3					
1934–35	SFD	38	9	6	23	58	82	24	20th	R1					
1935–36	SSD	34	28	3	3	132	34	59	1st	SF					
1936–37	SFD	38	19	6	13	98	66	44	7th	R2					
1937–38	SFD	38	19	9	10	82	52	47	4th	QF					
1938–39	SFD	38	19	7	12	73	63	45	5th	R3					
No competitive football was played between 1939 and 1946 due to World War II
1946–47	SFD	30	8	10	12	62	61	26	11th	R3	R1			John Wardlaw	9
1947–48	SFD	30	10	10	10	55	48	30	7th	R2	Runners-up			**Archie Aikman**	**20**
1948–49	SFD	30	12	8	10	70	54	32	5th	R1	R1			Archie Aikman	21
1949–50	SFD	30	7	10	13	48	72	24	14th	R2	R1			Jimmy Inglis	12
1950–51	SFD	30	7	4	19	35	81	18	16th	R1	R1			Angus Plumb	8
1951–52	SSD	30	18	7	5	80	34	43	2nd	QF	QF			Angus Plumb	25
1952–53	SFD	30	11	4	15	53	63	26	13th	R3	R1			Jimmy Delaney	13
1953–54	SFD	30	9	7	14	47	61	25	13th	R2	R1			Alex McCrae; Angus Plumb	11
1954–55	SFD	30	8	8	14	42	54	24	12th	QF	R1			John Davidson	12
1955–56	SFD	34	11	6	17	58	75	28	14th	R5	R1			Alex McCrae	11
1956–57	SFD	34	10	8	16	51	70	28	14th	Winners	R1			George Merchant	14
1957–58	SFD	34	11	9	14	64	82	31	10th	QF	R1			John McCole	14
1958–59	SFD	34	10	7	17	58	79	27	17th	R2	R1			Doug Moran	16
1959–60	SSD	36	15	9	12	77	43	39	8th	R2	QF			Doug Moran	17
1960–61	SSD	36	24	6	6	100	40	54	2nd	R1	R1			**Doug Moran**	**30**
1961–62	SFD	34	11	4	19	45	68	26	14th	R1	R1			Alex Duchart	9
1962–63	SFD	34	12	3	19	54	69	27	13th	R1	R1			Hugh Maxwell	12
1963–64	SFD	34	11	6	17	54	84	28	14th	QF	R1			Hugh Maxwell	17
1964–65	SFD	34	7	7	20	43	85	21	16th	R1	R1			Hugh Maxwell; Sammy Wilson	7
1965–66	SFD	34	15	1	18	48	72	31	10th	R1	R1			Johnny Graham	17
1966–67	SFD	34	11	4	19	33	70	26	14th	R2	R1			Johnny Graham	12
1967–68	SFD	34	7	12	15	36	50	26	15th	R1	R1			Johnny Graham	13
1968–69	SFD	34	5	8	21	33	69	18	17th	R1	R1			Johnny Graham	7
1969–70	SSD	36	25	6	5	94	34	56	1st	QF	QF			Tom Young	19
1970–71	SFD	34	13	9	12	46	53	35	7th	R3	QF			Alex Ferguson	14
1971–72	SFD	34	10	7	17	44	60	27	14th	R3	SF			Alex Ferguson	9
1972–73	SFD	34	7	12	15	38	56	26	14th	R4	R2			Jim Scott	7
1973–74	SFD	34	4	14	16	33	58	22	18th	R3	R1			Kirkie Lawson	8
1974–75	SSD	38	26	2	10	76	29	54	1st	R4	SF			John Whiteford	24
1975–76	SFL 1	26	10	5	11	38	35	25	8th	R4	R1			**John Whiteford**	**17**
1976–77	SFL 1	39	6	8	25	36	85	20	14th	R3	QF			Donald Ford	5
1977–78	SFL 2	39	15	14	10	51	46	44	5th	R1	R2			Ally McRoberts	13
1978–79	SFL 2	39	19	12	8	66	37	50	3rd	R3	R3			Ally McRoberts	12
1979–80	SFL 2	39	19	12	8	65	35	50	1st	R1	R2			Paul Leetion	13
1980–81	SFL 1	39	13	8	18	39	52	34	9th	R4	R1			Brian Brown; Colin Spence	5
1981–82	SFL 1	39	11	14	14	49	52	36	9th	R3	R1			Willie Herd	10
1982–83	SFL 1	39	15	6	18	45	55	36	8th	R3	R1			Peter Houston	8
1983–84	SFL 1	39	16	6	17	46	54	38	7th	R3	PR			Kevin McAllister	11
1984–85	SFL 1	39	19	7	13	65	54	45	3rd	R4	R2			**Gerry McCoy**	**23**
1985–86	SFL 1	39	17	11	11	57	39	45	2nd	R4	R2			Jimmy Gilmour	15
1986–87	SPD	44	8	10	26	31	70	26	10th	R3	R2			Ken Eadie	6
1987–88	SPD	44	10	11	23	41	75	31	10th	R3	R2			Crawford Baptie	9
1988–89	SFL 1	39	22	8	9	71	37	52	2nd	R3	R3			Alex Rae	12
1989–90	SFL 1	39	14	15	10	74	64	22	4th	R3	R3			Derek McWilliams	17
1990–91	SFL 1	39	21	12	6	70	35	54	1st	R4	R2	R1		Simon Stainrod	17
1991–92	SPD	44	12	11	21	54	73	35	9th	QF	R3			Eddie May; Kevin McAllister	9
1992–93	SPD	44	11	7	26	60	86	29	11th	QF	QF			Richard Cadette	8
1993–94	SFL 1	44	26	14	4	81	32	66	1st	R3	QF	Winners		Richard Cadette	18
1994–95	SPD	36	12	12	12	48	47	48	5th	R3	QF			Colin McDonald	9
1995–96	SPD	36	6	6	24	31	60	24	10th	R3	R3			Paul McGrillen	6
1996–97	SFL 1	36	15	9	12	42	39	54	5th	Runners-up	R2	R2		Mark McGraw	8
1997–98	SFL 1	36	19	8	9	56	41	65	2nd	SF	R3	Winners		David Moss	12
1998–99	SFL 1	36	20	6	10	60	38	66	2nd	QF	R3	^{[note 4]}		Marino Keith	17
1999–2000	SFL 1^{[note 5]}	36	20	8	8	67	40	68	3rd	QF	R3	R1		Scott Crabbe	14
2000–01	SFL 1	36	16	8	12	57	59	56	3rd	R3	R3	R1		Gareth Hutchison	11
2001–02	SFL 1^{[note 6]}	36	10	9	17	49	73	39	9th	R3	R2	R2		Lee Miller	11
2002–03	SFL 1^{[note 7]}	36	25	6	5	80	32	81	1st	QF	R3	QF		**Owen Coyle**	**20**
2003–04	SFL 1	36	15	10	11	43	37	55	4th	R4	R3	R1		Jason Lee	8
2004–05	SFL 1	36	22	9	5	66	30	75	1st	R3	R3	Winners		**Darryl Duffy**	**17**
2005–06	SPL	38	8	9	21	35	64	33	10th	QF	R3			Darryl Duffy	9
2006–07	SPL	38	15	5	18	49	47	50	7th	R4	SF			Anthony Stokes	14
2007–08	SPL	38	13	10	15	45	49	49	7th	R4	R3			Pedro Moutinho; Michael Higdon	8
2008–09	SPL	38	9	11	18	37	52	38	10th	Runners-up	SF			Steve Lovell	8
2009–10	SPL	38	6	13	19	31	57	31	12th	R4	R3		Europa League, QR2	Pedro Moutinho	6
2010–11	SFL 1	36	17	7	12	57	41	58	3rd	R4	QF	R1		**Mark Stewart**	**15**
2011–12	SFL 1	36	13	13	10	53	48	52	3rd	R5	SF	Winners		Farid El Alagui	18
2012–13	SFL 1	36	15	8	13	52	48	53	3rd	SF	R2	R2		Lyle Taylor	24
2013–14	SC	36	19	9	13	59	33	66	3rd	R4	R3	QF		Rory Loy	20
2014–15	SC	36	14	11	11	48	48	53	5th	Runners-up	R3	QF		Rory Loy	9
2015–16	SC	36	19	13	4	61	34	70	2nd	R4	R3	R2		John Baird	17
2016–17	SC	36	16	12	6	58	40	60	2nd	R4	GS	R4		Craig Sibbald	10
2017–18	SC	36	12	11	13	45	49	47	8th	QF	R2	QF		Louis Longridge	7
2018–19	SC	36	9	11	16	37	49	38	10th	R3	GS	R2		Zak Rudden	12
2019–20	League One	28	14	10	4	54	18	52	2nd	R5	GS	R3		Declan McManus	19
2020–21	League One	22	9	5	8	29	26	32	5th	R3	R2			Callumn Morrison	7
2021–22	League One	36	12	8	16	49	55	44	6th	R3	GS	R2		Anton Dowds	8
2022–23	League One	36	19	10	7	70	39	67	2nd	SF	R2	R4		Callumn Morrison	12
2023-24	League One	36	27	9	0	96	28	90	1st	R4	GS	SF		Callumn Morrison	23
2024-25	SC	36	22	7	7	72	33	73	1st	R4	QF	R3		Calvin Miller	10
2025-26	SP	36	14	7	17	50	62	49	6th	SF	R2			Barney Stewart	8

== Key ==
Champions	Runners-up	Promoted	Relegated

- P = Played
- W = Games won
- D = Games drawn
- L = Games lost
- F = Goals for
- A = Goals against
- Pts = Points
- Pos = Final position
- SFD = Scottish Division One
- SSD = Scottish Division Two
- SP = Scottish Premiership
- SC = Scottish Championship
- SPD = Scottish Premier Division
- SPL = Scottish Premier League
- SFL 1 = Scottish First Division
- SFL 2 = Scottish Second Division
- QR2 = Qualifying round 2
- PR = Preliminary round
- R1 = Round 1
- R2 = Round 2
- R3 = Round 3
- R4 = Round 4
- R5 = Round 5
- QF = Quarter-finals
- SF = Semi-finals

== Footnotes ==
^1. The Scottish League Cup did not start until 1946–47.

^2. The Scottish Challenge Cup did not start until 1990–91.

^3. European club competitions did not start until 1955–56 and Falkirk did not qualify until 2009–10.

^4. The 1998–99 Scottish Challenge Cup was suspended due to lack of sponsorship.

^5. The Scottish Premier League was being expanded to 12 teams so Falkirk was due to play a two-legged play-off with Aberdeen. However, Falkirk's Brockville Park did not meet the SPL's new 10,000 all-seater stadium criteria so the match never happened.

^6. After finishing 9th, Falkirk was due to be relegated to the Second Division but was spared because of the demise of Airdrieonians.

^7. Brockville Park still did not meet the SPL's 10,000 all-seater stadium criteria so Falkirk was denied promotion.
