= 1980–81 Dumbarton F.C. season =

Dumbarton
1980–1981 season
- Manager: Sean Fallon
- Stadium: Boghead Park, Dumbarton
- Scottish League Division 1: 8th
- Scottish Cup: Fourth Round
- Scottish League Cup: First Round
- Top goalscorer: League: Brian Gallacher (13); All: Brian Gallacher (14)

Season 1980–81 was the 97th football season in which Dumbarton competed at a Scottish national level, entering the Scottish Football League for the 75th time, the Scottish Cup for the 86th time and the Scottish League Cup for the 34th time.

== Overview ==
For the sixth year running, Dumbarton played league football in Division 1, and with Sean Fallon taking over the manager's post, there was some confidence that this season could see a top two finish. However, despite a promising start, results were mixed, and it was clear by the beginning of the year that any hopes of promotion had gone. Indeed, things might have been worse had there not been an unbeaten run in the final 6 games, and in the end Dumbarton finished in 8th place with 37 points, 20 behind champions Hibernian.

In the Scottish Cup, Dumbarton beat Premier Division opponents St Mirren in the third round before losing a close encounter in the next round to fellow Division 1 team Motherwell.

It was the same old story however in the League Cup, where Dumbarton lost in the first round, this time to Raith Rovers.

Locally, however, in the Stirlingshire Cup, there was something to cheer, with the silverware returning to Boghead after a final win over Stirling Albion.

== Results & fixtures ==
Win Draw Loss

=== Scottish First Division ===
9 August 1980 Scottish Division 1	Falkirk	0–5	Dumbarton	Brockville Park
			Brown 15'; MacLeod 71' (pen.); Rankin 72'; Blair 84', 87'	Referee: D Galloway

16 August 1980 Scottish Division 1	Dumbarton	0–3	St Johnstone	Boghead Park
			Morton 27'; Brannigan 42'; McCoist 73'	Attendance: 1,000; Referee: K Stewart

23 August 1980 Scottish Division 1	Clydebank	1–4	Dumbarton	Kilbowie Park
	McGorm 72'		Gallacher,B 11'; Blair 33', 68'; Coyle,J 48'	Attendance: 2,000; Referee: J Duncan

6 September 1980 Scottish Division 1	Hamilton	1–1	Dumbarton	Douglas Park
	Fairley 79'		Rankin 50'	Attendance: 2,000; Referee: C White

9 September 1980 Scottish Division 1	Dunfermline Athletic	1–1	Dumbarton	East End Park
	O'Brien 49'		Brown 64'	Attendance: 2,400; Referee: W McLeish

13 September 1980 Scottish Division 1	Dumbarton	2–2	East Stirling	Boghead Park
	Gallacher,B 56'; MacLeod 58'		Coyle,T 10' (o.g.); McCulley 54' (pen.)	Attendance: 600; Referee: P McKenzie

17 September 1980 Scottish Division 1	Dumbarton	2–0	Berwick Rangers	Boghead Park
	Coyle,J; MacLeod			Attendance: 1,250; Referee: B McGinlay

20 September 1980 Scottish Division 1	Raith Rovers	4–1	Dumbarton	Starks Park
	Harrow 8'; Urquhart 34'; Lawson 47', 49'		Coyle,J 77'	Attendance: 1,600; Referee: A McFaull

27 September 1980 Scottish Division 1	Dumbarton	1–2	Motherwell	Boghead Park
	Gallacher,B 40'		Kidd 72' (pen.); McKeever 88'	Attendance: 1,000; Referee: E Pringle

1 October 1980 Scottish Division 1	Dumbarton	2–0	Hibernian	Boghead Park
	Gallacher,B 68'; Rankin 86'			Attendance: 2,500; Referee: A McFaull

4 October 1980 Scottish Division 1	Dundee	3–1	Dumbarton	Dens Park
	Fleming 2'; Shirra 32'; Sinclair 59'		Schaedler 62' (o.g.)	Attendance: 3,553; Referee: A McFaull

11 October 1980 Scottish Division 1	Stirling Albion	0–1	Dumbarton	Annfield Stadium
			Donnelly 41'	Attendance: 700; Referee: W Anderson

18 October 1980 Scottish Division 1	Dumbarton	0–1	Ayr United	Boghead Park
			Morris 60'	Attendance: 1,000; Referee: W Waddell

25 October 1980 Scottish Division 1	East Stirling	2–1	Dumbarton	Firs Park
	Lamont 22'; Rennie 87'		Gallacher,B 73'	Attendance: 550; Referee: L Thow

1 November 1980 Scottish Division 1	Dumbarton	2–1	Hamilton	Boghead Park
	Gallacher,B 9', 72'		Fairlie 56'	Attendance: 550; Referee: D Galloway

8 November 1980 Scottish Division 1	Berwick Rangers	2–2	Dumbarton	Shielfield Park
	Hamilton 70' (pen.), 71' (pen.)		Donnelly 68'; Brown 85'	Attendance: 759; Referee: P McKenzie

15 November 1980 Scottish Division 1	Dumbarton	2–2	Raith Rovers	Boghead Park
	Donnelly 6'; McGowan,P 78'		Harris 27'; Ballantyne 73'	Attendance: 750; Referee: A Waddell

22 November 1980 Scottish Division 1	Motherwell	4–2	Dumbarton	Fir Park
	Forbes 28'; Clelland 39'; McClelland 67'; Soutar 83'		Jackson 26'; Smith 29' (o.g.)	Attendance: 2,223; Referee: J Renton

29 November 1980 Scottish Division 1	Dumbarton	1–2	Dundee	Boghead Park
	Gallacher,B 19'		Stephen 47', 87'	Attendance: 800; Referee: H Alexander

6 December 1980 Scottish Division 1	Dumbarton	2–0	Stirling Albion	Boghead Park
	Clougherty 25'; Gallacher,B 77'			Attendance: 250; Referee: B Robertson

13 December 1980 Scottish Division 1	Ayr United	0–0	Dumbarton	Somerset Park
				Attendance: 1,875; Referee: A Ferguson

20 December 1980 Scottish Division 1	Dumbarton	1–0	Dunfermline Athletic	Boghead Park
	Gallacher,B 40'			Attendance: 400; Referee: K Hope

27 December 1980 Scottish Division 1	St Johnstone	2–0	Dumbarton	Muirton Park
	Docherty 14', 75'			Attendance: 2,018; Referee: W Knowles

1 January 1981 Scottish Division 1	Dumbarton	1–1	Clydebank	Boghead Park
	Brown 36'		Sharkley 15'	Attendance: 2,900; Referee: C White

3 January 1981 Scottish Division 1	Hibernian	1–0	Dumbarton	Easter Road
	Murray 25'			Attendance: 5,546; Referee: T Muirhead

10 January 1981 Scottish Division 1	Dumbarton	0–1	Falkirk	Boghead Park
			Brown 71'	Attendance: 400; Referee: F McKenzie

31 January 1981 Scottish Division 1	Dumbarton	1–0	East Stirling	Boghead Park
	MacLeod 20'			Attendance: 450

7 February 1981 Scottish Division 1	Raith Rovers	1–0	Dumbarton	Starks Park
	Jackson 89' (o.g.)			Attendance: 1,500; Referee: R Cuthill

21 February 1981 Scottish Division 1	Dumbarton	1–1	Berwick Rangers	Boghead Park
	Donnelly 78'		Hamilton 36'	Attendance: 400; Referee: D Galloway

11 March 1981 Scottish Division 1	Dundee	2–1	Dumbarton	Dens Park
	Scrimgeour 5'; Carson 55' (o.g.)		Gallacher,J 16'	Attendance: 2,812; Referee: L Thow

14 March 1981 Scottish Division 1	Stirling Albion	0–0	Dumbarton	Annfield Stadium
				Attendance: 500; Referee: R Ballantyne

21 March 1981 Scottish Division 1	Dumbarton	1–4	Hibernian	Boghead Park
	Rankin 28'		Rae 1', 72'; Murray 59', 76'	Attendance: 913; Referee: W McLeish

28 March 1981 Scottish Division 1	St Johnstone	2–1	Dumbarton	Muirton Park
	Brogan 9'; Kilgour 58'		Gallacher,B 43'	Attendance: 2,476; Referee: D Galloway

4 April 1981 Scottish Division 1	Dumbarton	2–1	Hamilton	Boghead Park
	Gallacher,B 31'; Brown 43'		McDowall 89'	Attendance: 400; Referee: J Timmons

8 April 1981 Scottish Division 1	Dumbarton	0–0	Motherwell	Boghead Park
				Attendance: 1,000; Referee: B McGinley

11 April 1981 Scottish Division 1	Falkirk	1–3	Dumbarton	Brockville Park
	Smith 68'		Blair 50', 65'; Brown 55'	Attendance: 1,500; Referee: H Alexander

18 April 1981 Scottish Division 1	Dumbarton	1–2	Dunfermline Athletic	Boghead Park
	Brown 77'; Gallacher,B 89'		Jenkins 67'	Attendance: 450; Referee: T Muirhead

25 April 1981 Scottish Division 1	Ayr United	1–2	Dumbarton	Somerset Park
	Morris 52'		Blair 12', 18'	Attendance: 998; Referee: M Delaney

2 May 1981 Scottish Division 1	Clydebank	0–0	Dumbarton	Kilbowie Park
				Attendance: 300; Referee: J Thomson

=== Scottish Cup ===
24 January 1981 Scottish Cup round 3	St Mirren	0–2	Dumbarton	Love Street (stadium)
			Donnelly 23'; Coyle,J 86'	Attendance: 6,209; Referee: D Syme

14 February 1981 Scottish Cup round 3	Motherwell	2–1	Dumbarton	Fir Park
	Gahagan 2'; McLaughlin 67'		Coyle,J 68'	Attendance: 4,374; Referee: B Robertson

=== Scottish League Cup ===
27 August 1980 Scottish League Cup round 1(1)	Dumbarton	0–1	Raith Rovers	Boghead Park
			Harrow 51'	Attendance: 600; Referee: C White

30 August 1980 Scottish League Cup round 1(1)	Raith Rovers	0–0 (1–0 agg.)	Dumbarton	Starks Park
				Attendance: 1,750; Referee: A Harris

=== Stirlingshire Cup ===
13 October 1980 First Round	Falkirk	1–2	Dumbarton	Brockville Park
	McRoberts 62'		Kennedy 9'; McGowan,P 89'

14 April 1981 Semi Final	Dumbarton	3–0	Stenhousemuir	Boghead Park
	Brown

29 April 1981 Final	Dumbarton	3–0	Stirling Albion	Boghead Park
	Goal

=== Scottish Brewers Trophy ===
27 July 1980 Group	Forfar Athletic	2–1	Dumbarton	Kynock Park
	Goal		Goal

28 July 1980 Group	Keith	0–2	Dumbarton	Kynock Park
			Goal

=== Pre-season/Other matches ===
5 August 1980 Friendly	Dumbarton	0–6	(England) Coventry City	Boghead Park
			Gooding 10'; Hunt 54' (pen.); Thomson 70'; Dyson 82'; Van Gool 86'; English 90'	Attendance: 800; Referee: A McFaull

6 March 1981 Friendly	Dumbarton	0–2	Celtic XI	Boghead Park
			Weir; McCluskey

== League table ==
Pos	Team	Pld	W	D	L	GF	GA	GD	Pts
6	Ayr United	39	17	11	11	59	42	+17	45
7	Hamilton Academical	39	15	7	17	61	57	+4	37
8	Dumbarton	39	13	11	15	49	50	−1	37
9	Falkirk	39	13	8	18	39	52	−13	34
10	Clydebank	39	10	13	16	48	59	−11	33

Source: RSSSF
Rules for classification: 1) points; 2) goal difference; 3) number of goals scored.

== Player statistics ==
=== Squad ===
No.	Pos	Nat	Player	Total		First Division		Scottish Cup		League Cup	
No.	Pos	Nat	Player	Apps	Goals	Apps	Goals	Apps	Goals	Apps	Goals
	GK	(Scotland) SCO	Tom Carson	37	0	33	0	2	0	2	0
	GK	(Scotland) SCO	Donald Hunter	6	0	6	0	0	0	0	0
	DF	(Scotland) SCO	Rob Campbell	16	0	11+5	0	0	0	0	0
	DF	(Scotland) SCO	Martin McGowan	1	0	0+1	0	0	0	0	0
	DF	(Scotland) SCO	Joe O'Donnell	1	0	1	0	0	0	0	0
	MF	(Scotland) SCO	George Brannigan	1	0	1	0	0	0	0	0
	MF	(Scotland) SCO	Mark Clougherty	34	1	32	1	0	0	2	0
	MF	(Scotland) SCO	Tommy Coyle	33	0	29+1	0	2	0	1	0
	MF	(Scotland) SCO	John Gallacher	27	1	23	1	2	0	2	0
	MF	(Scotland) SCO	Billy Hutchinson	3	0	3	0	0	0	0	0
	MF	(Scotland) SCO	Dave Jackson	8	1	7+1	1	0	0	0	0
	MF	(Scotland) SCO	Jim Martin	15	0	5+9	0	0	0	1	0
	MF	(Scotland) SCO	Ally MacLeod	43	4	39	4	2	0	2	0
	MF	(Scotland) SCO	Donald McNeil	2	0	2	0	0	0	0	0
	MF	(Scotland) SCO	Graeme Sinclair	40	0	36	0	2	0	2	0
	FW	(Scotland) SCO	Steve Armstrong	2	0	0+2	0	0	0	0	0
	FW	(Scotland) SCO	Raymond Blair	34	8	22+8	8	0+2	0	2	0
	FW	(Scotland) SCO	Ally Brown	25	7	23	7	0	0	2	0
	FW	(Scotland) SCO	Joe Coyle	29	5	25	3	2	2	2	0
	FW	(Scotland) SCO	John Donnelly	18	5	14+2	4	2	1	0	0
	FW	(Scotland) SCO	Brian Gallacher	37	14	33	13	2	0	2	1
	FW	(Scotland) SCO	Ian Gibson	3	0	0+3	0	0	0	0	0
	FW	(Scotland) SCO	Joe Kennedy	7	0	4+3	0	0	0	0	0
	FW	(Scotland) SCO	John Mailer	11	0	11	0	0	0	0	0
	FW	(Scotland) SCO	Gerry Marshall	3	0	1+1	0	0	0	0+1	0
	FW	(Scotland) SCO	Pat McGowan	27	1	21+4	1	2	0	0	0
	FW	(Scotland) SCO	Tommy McGrain	28	0	23+2	0	2	0	1	0
	FW	(Scotland) SCO	Mike Rankin	32	4	23+5	4	2	0	1+1	0
	FW	(Scotland) SCO	Sean Sweeney	1	0	0+1	0	0	0	0	0

=== Transfers ===
Amongst those players joining and leaving the club were the following:

==== Players in ====
Player	From	Date
(Scotland) Martin McGowan	(Scotland) Campsie BW	22 Jul 1980
(Scotland) Mark Clougherty	(Scotland) Clyde	16 Aug 1980
(Scotland) John Donnelly	(Scotland) Motherwell	30 Sep 1980
(Scotland) Pat McGowan	(Scotland) Glenboig	7 Oct 1980

==== Players out ====
Player	To	Date
(Scotland) Donald Hunter	(Scotland) Alloa Athletic	27 Aug 1980
(Scotland) Pat McCluskey	(Scotland) Airdrie	8 Oct 1980
(Scotland) Laurie Williams	(Scotland) Motherwell	17 Oct 1980

== Reserve team ==
Dumbarton competed in the Scottish Reserve League First Division (West), winning 6 and drawing 6 of 26 games - finishing 11th of 14.

In the Scottish Second XI Cup, Dumbarton again lost to Dundee United in the fourth round, and in the Reserve League Cup, Dumbarton lost to Partick Thistle in the first round.

== Trivia ==
- The League match against Dunfermline on 9 September marked Joe Coyle's 100th appearance for Dumbarton in all national competitions - the 82nd Dumbarton player to reach this milestone.
- The League match against Motherwell on 27 September marked Ally MacLeod's 100th appearance for Dumbarton in all national competitions - the 83rd Dumbarton player to reach this milestone.
- The Scottish Cup match against Motherwell on 14 February marked John Gallacher's 100th appearance for Dumbarton in all national competitions - the 84th Dumbarton player to reach this milestone.
- The League match against Hamilton on 4 April marked Graeme Sinclair's 200th appearance for Dumbarton in all national competitions - the 15th Dumbarton player to break the 'double century'.
- The signing fee of £13,500 paid to Clyde for Mark Clougherty was a new club record.
- During the season there was an amazing attempt to sign Johan Cruyff on a match-to-match basis. The £1,500 per match offer was eventually declined in favour of a £1.5 million contract from the USA.
- The disappointing season was in the end to result in Sean Fallon's resignation as manager.

== See also ==
- 1980–81 in Scottish football
