= 1981–82 Dumbarton F.C. season =

Dumbarton
1981–1982 season
- Manager: Billy Lamont
- Stadium: Boghead Park, Dumbarton
- Scottish League Division 1: 11th
- Scottish Cup: Fourth Round
- Scottish League Cup: Prelims
- Top goalscorer: League: Raymond Blair (9); All: Raymond Blair (12)

Season 1981–82 was the 98th football season in which Dumbarton competed at a Scottish national level, entering the Scottish Football League for the 76th time, the Scottish Cup for the 87th time and the Scottish League Cup for the 35th time.

== Overview ==
For the seventh year in a row, Dumbarton played league football in Division 1. They started the season with a new manager, Billy Lamont. The season included wins over Hearts, and ended with the club in 11th-place with 35 points, 26 behind champions Motherwell.

In the Scottish Cup, Dumbarton beat Premier Division opponents Partick Thistle in the third round, but lost to Rangers in the next round.

The League Cup format reverted to sectional games for qualification to the latter stages, and Dumbarton could only manage two home wins from six games, from what had been expected to be a relatively easy section.

Locally, in the Stirlingshire Cup, Dumbarton almost retained the cup, but lost out on penalties to Alloa in the final.

== Results and fixtures ==
Win Draw Loss

=== Scottish First Division ===
29 August 1981 First Division	Dumbarton	0–3	East Stirling	Boghead Park
			Howatt 31'; Lamont 34'; Renwick 88'	Attendance: 400; Referee: F Kenzie

5 September 1981 First Division	Queen of the South	0–4	Dumbarton	Palmerston Park
			Coyle, J 16'; Montgomerie 38'; Blair 77'; Brown 89'	Attendance: 1,000; Referee: E Pringle

12 September 1981 First Division	Dumbarton	1–3	Clydebank	Boghead Park
	Montgomerie 23'		McCabe 46'; McGorm 74'; Miller 79'	Attendance: 1,000; Referee: B McGinley

16 September 1981 First Division	Raith Rovers	1–3	Dumbarton	Starks Park
	Ford 41'		Brown 26'; Coyle, J 78', 79'	Attendance: 876; Referee: W Young

19 September 1981 First Division	Dumbarton	0–6	Motherwell	Boghead Park
			Clelland 7', 29', 53'; McLaughlan 38', 89' (pen.); Clinging 70'	Attendance: 1,000; Referee: B Robertson

23 September 1981 First Division	Queen's Park	3–0	Dumbarton	Hampden Park
	Gilmour 18'; Wood 52'			Attendance: 987; Referee: A Huett

26 September 1981 First Division	Hearts	2–1	Dumbarton	Tynecastle Stadium
	MacDonald 30'; O'Connor 46'		Blair 84'	Attendance: 3,627; Referee: H Alexander

30 September 1981 First Division	Ayr United	3–2	Dumbarton	Somerset Park
	Christie 52', 66'; Kean 61'		Dunlop 6'; Coyle, T 35'	Attendance: 977; Referee: K Hope

3 October 1981 First Division	Dumbarton	2–1	St Johnstone	Boghead Park
	McGowan, P 43'; Rankin 60'		McDonald 6'	Attendance: 500; Referee: M Delaney

10 October 1981 First Division	Dumbarton	1–2	Hamilton	Boghead Park
	Brown 1'		Craig 2', 66'	Attendance: 350; Referee: R Cuthill

17 October 1981 First Division	Dunfermline Athletic	2–2	Dumbarton	East End Park
	McNaughton 13'; Considine 17'		Blair 22'; Dunlop 33'	Attendance: 1,994

24 October 1981 First Division	Dumbarton	0–2	Kilmarnock	Boghead Park
			Mauchlen 67'; Clark, J 77'	Attendance: 800; Referee: G Smith

31 October 1981 First Division	Falkirk	1–1	Dumbarton	Brockville Park
	Brown 46'		Dunlop 44'	Attendance: 2,500; Referee: A McGunnigle

7 November 1981 First Division	Dumbarton	1–0	Queen of the South	Boghead Park
	McGowan, P 57'			Attendance: 400; Referee: H Young

14 November 1981 First Division	East Stirling	1–1	Dumbarton	Firs Park
	McCulley 35'		Donnelly 15' (pen.)	Attendance: 1,500; Referee: J Renton

21 November 1981 First Division	Dumbarton	1–1	Raith Rovers	Boghead Park
	Coyle, J 16'		Gibson 57' (pen.)	Attendance: 400; Referee: C Sinclair

28 November 1981 First Division	Dumbarton	3–1	Hearts	Boghead Park
	Blair 29'; McGowan, P 57'; Dunlop 66'		Marinello 82'	Attendance: 1,200; Referee: F Syme

5 December 1981 First Division	St Johnstone	5–2	Dumbarton	Muirton Park
	Weir 10'; Morton 23', 77'; Mackay 65'; Brogan 87'		Blair 20'; Kenny 80' (pen.)	Attendance: 1,776; Referee: E Pringle

30 January 1982 First Division	Kilmarnock	0–0	Dumbarton	Rugby Park
				Attendance: 1,350; Referee: R Cuthill

6 February 1982 First Division	Dumbarton	3–1	Falkirk	Boghead Park
	Montgomerie 10'; Coyle, J 85'; Brown 88'		Mackin 78'	Attendance: 450; Referee: D Syme

17 February 1982 First Division	Clydebank	3–0	Dumbarton	Kilbowie Park
	Ronald 19'; Given 61' (pen.); Miller 85'			Attendance: 2,650; Referee: C White

20 February 1982 First Division	Dumbarton	2–0	St Johnstone	Boghead Park
	Donnelly 49'; Montgomerie 67'			Attendance: 400; Referee: A Ferguson

23 February 1982 First Division	Dumbarton	0–1	Dunfermline Athletic	Boghead Park
			McNaughton 65'	Attendance: 950; Referee: W Young

27 February 1982 First Division	East Stirling	2–2	Dumbarton	Firs Park
	Lowe 21'; Grant 69'		Blair 42'; McGowan, M 80'	Attendance: 300; Referee: B Robertson

3 March 1982 First Division	Motherwell	1–1	Dumbarton	Fir Park
	Carson 60'		Brown 35'	Attendance: 2,022; Referee: D Ramsay

6 March 1982 First Division	Dumbarton	3–1	Ayr United	Boghead Park
	Gallacher 36'; Blair 37'; Brown 50'		Christie 40'	Attendance: 500; Referee: A Hewitt

13 March 1982 First Division	Dumbarton	0–2	Clydebank	Boghead Park
			Miller 54'; McCabe 60'	Attendance: 700; Referee: D Ramsay

20 March 1982 First Division	Dunfermline Athletic	0–0	Dumbarton	East End Park
				Attendance: 1,500; Referee: R Valentine

27 March 1982 First Division	Queen's Park	3–0	Dumbarton	Hampden Park
	McNiven 9'; Gilmour 56'; McGregor 58'			Attendance: 732; Referee: J Renton

3 April 1982 First Division	Dumbarton	0–2	Raith Rovers	Boghead Park
			Ballantyne 36', 89'	Attendance: 300; Referee: K Stewart

7 April 1982 First Division	Dumbarton	3–1	Ayr United	Boghead Park
	Donnelly 14' (pen.), 43' (pen.); Montgomerie 64'		McInally 19'	Attendance: 282; Referee: J Duncan

10 April 1982 First Division	Motherwell	1–0	Dumbarton	Firs Park
	Clelland 54'			Attendance: 2,742; Referee: A Huett

14 April 1982 First Division	Dumbarton	1–0	Queen's Park	Boghead Park
	Craig			Attendance: 450; Referee: A Waddell

17 April 1982 First Division	Dumbarton	3–1	Queen of the South	Boghead Park
	Craig 19'; Blair 75'; McNeil 80'		Alexander 51'	Attendance: 250; Referee: H Young

21 April 1982 First Division	Hamilton	0–0	Dumbarton	Douglas Park
				Attendance: 1,004; Referee: R Valentine

24 April 1982 First Division	Dumbarton	0–2	Kilmarnock	Boghead Park
			Goal	Attendance: 800; Referee: T Muirhead

1 May 1982 First Division	Hearts	2–5	Dumbarton	Tynecastle Stadium
	Byrne 35'; Pettigrew 42'		Coyle, J 30'; Dunlop 57', 65', 82'; McGowan, P 82'	Attendance: 4,861; Referee: L Thow

8 May 1982 First Division	Dumbarton	1–0	Falkirk	Boghead Park
	Donnelly 37' (pen.)			Attendance: 500; Referee: A McKenzie

15 May 1982 First Division	Hamilton	1–0	Dumbarton	Douglas Park
	McGowan 10' (o.g.)			Attendance: 700; Referee: H Alexander

=== Scottish League Cup ===
8 August 1981 Section 5	Cowdenbeath	2–0	Dumbarton	Central Park, Cowdenbeath
	Allison 37'; Mercer 78'			Attendance: 368; Referee: A Ferguson

12 August 1981 Section 5	Dumbarton	1–0	Queen of the South	Boghead Park
	Blair 87' (pen.)			Attendance: 386; Referee: J Timmons

15 August 1981 Section 5	Brechin City	2–1	Dumbarton	Glebe Park, Brechin
	Graham 68'; Campbell 73'		Blair 66' (pen.)	Attendance: 500; Referee: D Ramsay

19 August 1981 Section 5	Queen of the South	3–2	Dumbarton	Palmerston Park
	Alexander; McVittie 63'		Mailer 82'; Campbell 83'	Attendance: 567; Referee: H Williamson

22 August 1981 Section 5	Dumbarton	3–0	Cowdenbeath	Boghead Park
	Blair 33' (pen.); Mailer 44'; Rankin 66'			Attendance: 500; Referee: T Muirhead

26 August 1981 Section 5	Dumbarton	1–3	Brechin City	Boghead Park
	Gallacher 80'		Paterson 30', 38'; Campbell 53'	Attendance: 400; Referee: C White

=== Scottish Cup ===
24 January 1982 Scottish Cup round 3	Partick Thistle	1–2	Dumbarton	Firhill Park
	Johnston 44'		Coyle, J 4'; Donnelly 32'	Attendance: 4,000; Referee: R Valentine

13 February 1982 Scottish Cup round 3	Rangers	4–0	Dumbarton	Ibrox Park
	Jardine 58', 89'; McAdam 67'; Johnstone 74'			Attendance: 15,000; Referee: T Muirhead

=== Stirlingshire Cup ===
27 October 1981 1st Round	East Stirling	4–5	Dumbarton	Firs Park
	Edgar 40'; Goodall 43'; McCaig 52', 75'		Blair 32' (pen.), 69', 82'; McGowan, P 35'; Coyle, J 68'

21 January 1981 Semi Final	Dumbarton	2–1	Clydebank	Boghead Park
	Montgomerie 40', 42'		Williamson 60'	Attendance: 123

10 May 1982 Final	Alloa Athletic	1–1 (5–4 p)	Dumbarton	Recreation Park, Alloa
	Murray		Donnelly (pen.)

=== Pre-season matches ===
1 August 1981 Friendly	Dumbarton	3–0	Cumbernauld United	Boghead Park
	Blair

== League table ==
Pos	Team	Pld	W	D	L	GF	GA	GD	Pts	Promotion or relegation
9	Falkirk	39	11	14	14	49	52	−3	36	
10	Dunfermline Athletic	39	11	14	14	46	56	−10	36	
11	Dumbarton	39	13	9	17	49	61	−12	35	
12	Raith Rovers	39	11	7	21	31	59	−28	29	
13	East Stirlingshire (R)	39	7	10	22	38	77	−39	24	Relegation to the Second Division

Source: RSSSF
Rules for classification: 1) points; 2) goal difference; 3) number of goals scored.
(R) Relegated

== Player statistics ==
=== Squad ===
No.	Pos	Nat	Player	Total		First Division		Scottish Cup		League Cup	
No.	Pos	Nat	Player	Apps	Goals	Apps	Goals	Apps	Goals	Apps	Goals
	GK	(Scotland) SCO	Tom Carson	47	0	39	0	2	0	6	0
	DF	(Scotland) SCO	Rob Campbell	22	1	14+1	0	1	0	5+1	1
	DF	(Scotland) SCO	Martin McGowan	30	1	26+3	1	1	0	0	0
	DF	(Scotland) SCO	Ray Montgomerie	21	5	17+3	5	0+1	0	0	0
	MF	(Scotland) SCO	Mark Clougherty	26	0	21+1	0	2	0	1+1	0
	MF	(Scotland) SCO	Tommy Coyle	46	1	38	1	2	0	6	0
	MF	(Scotland) SCO	Albert Craig	13	2	9+4	2	0	0	0	0
	MF	(Scotland) SCO	Alistair Edmiston	1	0	1	0	0	0	0	0
	MF	(Scotland) SCO	John Gallacher	39	2	31	1	2	0	6	1
	MF	(Scotland) SCO	Ally MacLeod	8	0	2	0	0	0	6	0
	MF	(Scotland) SCO	Donald McNeil	21	1	18+1	1	0	0	1+1	0
	MF	(Scotland) SCO	Graeme Sinclair	34	0	24+2	0	2	0	6	0
	FW	(Scotland) SCO	Steve Armstrong	4	0	2+1	0	0	0	0+1	0
	FW	(Scotland) SCO	Raymond Blair	47	12	36+3	9	2	0	6	3
	FW	(Scotland) SCO	Ally Brown	37	6	22+9	6	0	0	6	0
	FW	(Scotland) SCO	John Cameron	1	0	1	0	0	0	0	0
	FW	(Scotland) SCO	Joe Coyle	43	6	32+3	5	2	1	6	0
	FW	(Scotland) SCO	John Donnelly	42	6	31+3	5	2	1	2+4	0
	FW	(Scotland) SCO	Mick Dunlop	32	7	30	7	2	0	0	0
	FW	(Scotland) SCO	Dave Kenny	1	1	0+1	1	0	0	0	0
	FW	(Scotland) SCO	John Mailer	5	2	0+2	0	0	0	2+1	2
	FW	(Scotland) SCO	D McGeoch	2	0	2	0	0	0	0	0
	FW	(Scotland) SCO	Pat McGowan	20	4	16	4	1	0	3	0
	FW	(Scotland) SCO	Ally McRoberts	9	0	4+4	0	1	0	0	0
	FW	(Scotland) SCO	Mike Rankin	32	2	11+14	1	0+1	0	4+2	1
	FW	(Scotland) SCO	Ian Wotherspoon	1	0	1	0	0	0	0	0

=== International Caps ===
Graeme Sinclair played for Scotland in a 'semi-pro' international tournament involving teams from England, Holland and Italy. Scotland won the tournament by beating Holland Amateurs 2–1, drawing 2–2 against Italy Serie C and drawing 1–1 against England semi pro.

=== Transfers ===
Amongst those players joining and leaving the club were the following:

==== Players in ====
Player	From	Date
(Scotland) Ray Montgomerie	(England) Newcastle Utd	26 Aug 1981
(Scotland) Mick Dunlop	(Scotland) Benburb	24 Oct 1981
(Scotland) Albert Craig	(Scotland) Yoker Ath	30 Dec 1981
(Scotland) Ally McRoberts	(Scotland) Falkirk	27 Jan 1982

==== Players out ====
Player	To	Date
(Scotland) Brian Gallacher	(Scotland) Kilmarnock	20 May 1981
(Scotland) Ally MacLeod	(Scotland) Kilmarnock	10 Sep 1981
(Scotland) Tommy McGrain	(Scotland) Pollok	30 Nov 1981
(Scotland) John Gallacher	(Scotland) Retired	

== See also ==
- 1981–82 in Scottish football
