= 1953–54 Heart of Midlothian F.C. season =

Heart of Midlothian
1953–54 season
- Manager: Tommy Walker
- Stadium: Tynecastle Park
- Scottish First Division: 2nd
- Scottish Cup: Round 4
- League Cup: Group Stage

During the 1953–54 season Hearts competed in the Scottish First Division, the Scottish Cup, the Scottish League Cup and the East of Scotland Shield.

== Fixtures ==
=== Friendlies ===
28 September 1953 Friendly	Portsmouth	2–2	Hearts	Fratton Park
	Goal

7 October 1953 Friendly	Newcastle United	2–2	Hearts	St James' Park
	Goal

14 October 1953 Friendly	Manchester City	6–3	Hearts	Maine Road
	Goal

19 October 1953 Friendly	West Ham United	7–0	Hearts	Upton Park
	Goal

9 November 1953 Friendly	Doncaster Rovers	1–3	Hearts	Belle Vue
	Goal

31 March 1954 Friendly	Hearts	1–3	Chelsea	Tynecastle Park
	Goal

12 April 1954 Friendly	Hearts	0–2	SK Admira Vienna	Tynecastle Park
	Goal

22 May 1954 Tour	Southern Transvaal	0–2	Hearts	Johannesburg
	Goal

26 May 1954 Tour	Northern Transvaal	0–4	Hearts	Pretoria
	Goal

29 May 1954 Tour	Natal	2–11	Hearts	Durban
	Goal

31 May 1954 Tour	Western Province	2–5	Hearts	Cape Town
	Goal

5 June 1954 Tour	Eastern Transvaal	0–3	Hearts	Benoni
	Goal

9 June 1954 Tour	Orange Free State	0–4	Hearts	Bloemfontein
	Goal

12 June 1954 Tour	South Africa	0–2	Hearts	Johannesburg
	Goal

16 June 1954 Tour	Natal	0–1	Hearts	Pietermaritzburg
	Goal

19 June 1954 Tour	South Africa	2–1	Hearts	Durban
	Goal

22 June 1954 Tour	Southern Transvaal	2–3	Hearts	Johannesburg
	Goal

=== Penman Cup ===
23 September 1953 Round 2	Cowdenbeath	6–2	Hearts	Central Park

21 April 1954 Quarter-Final	Dunfermline Athletic	1–4	Hearts	East End Park

27 April 1954 Semi-Final	Hearts	4–1	Stirling Albion	Tynecastle Park

1 May 1954 Final	Hearts	2–4	Stenhousemuir	Tynecastle Park

=== League Cup ===
8 August 1953 League Cup Group	Hearts	5–0	Hamilton Academical	Tynecastle Park
				Attendance: 27,064

12 August 1953 League Cup Group	Rangers	4–1	Hearts	Ibrox Park
				Attendance: 60,000

15 August 1953 League Cup Group	Hearts	2–0	Raith Rovers	Tynecastle Park
				Attendance: 22,196

22 August 1953 League Cup Group	Hamilton Academical	1–1	Hearts	Douglas Park
				Attendance: 14,000

26 August 1953 League Cup Group	Hearts	1–1	Rangers	Tynecastle Park
				Attendance: 33,874

29 August 1953 League Cup Group	Raith Rovers	3–1	Hearts	Stark's Park
				Attendance: 9,000

=== Scottish Cup ===
13 February 1954 Scottish Cup R2	Fraserburgh	0–3	Hearts	Bellslea Park
				Attendance: 5,800

27 February 1954 Scottish Cup R3	Queen of the South	1–2	Hearts	Palmerston Park
				Attendance: 23,000

13 March 1954 Scottish Cup R4	Aberdeen	3–0	Hearts	Pittodrie Park
				Attendance: 45,061

=== Scottish First Division ===
5 September 1953 Scottish First Division	Hearts	2–2	East Fife	Tynecastle Park
				Attendance: 24,000

12 September 1953 Scottish First Division	Hearts	1–4	Queen of the South	Tynecastle Park
				Attendance: 20,000

19 September 1953 Scottish First Division	Hearts	4–0	Hibernian	Tynecastle Park
				Attendance: 45,000

26 September 1953 Scottish First Division	Airdrieonians	2–1	Hearts	Broomfield Park
				Attendance: 14,000

3 October 1953 Scottish First Division	Hearts	6–1	Stirling Albion	Tynecastle Park
				Attendance: 21,200

10 October 1953 Scottish First Division	St Mirren	1–1	Hearts	St Mirren Park, Love Street
				Attendance: 15,000

17 October 1953 Scottish First Division	Hearts	2–1	Dundee	Tynecastle Park
				Attendance: 26,000

24 October 1953 Scottish First Division	Celtic	2–0	Hearts	Rugby Park
				Attendance: 30,000

31 October 1953 Scottish First Division	Rangers	0–1	Hearts	Tynecastle Park
				Attendance: 30,000

7 November 1953 Scottish First Division	Hearts	1–2	Clyde	Tynecastle Park
				Attendance: 16,000

14 November 1953 Scottish First Division	Hearts	5–1	Raith Rovers	Tynecastle Park
				Attendance: 22,000

21 November 1953 Scottish First Division	Hamilton Academical	1–5	Hearts	Douglas Park
				Attendance: 10,000

28 November 1953 Scottish First Division	Hearts	3–2	Aberdeen	Tynecastle Park
				Attendance: 28,000

5 December 1953 Scottish First Division	Queen of the South	2–2	Hearts	Palmerston Park
				Attendance: 12,000

12 December 1953 Scottish First Division	Falkirk	1–3	Hearts	Brockville Park
				Attendance: 12,500

19 December 1953 Scottish First Division	East Fife	2–2	Hearts	Bayview Park
				Attendance: 14,000

26 December 1953 Scottish First Division	Hearts	0–2	Partick Thistle	Tynecastle Park
				Attendance: 16,000

1 January 1954 Scottish First Division	Hibernian	1–2	Hearts	Easter Road
				Attendance: 48,000

2 January 1954 Scottish First Division	Hearts	4–3	Airdrieonians	Tynecastle Park
				Attendance: 24,000

9 January 1954 Scottish First Division	Stirling Albion	0–3	Hearts	Annfield Stadium
				Attendance: 16,000

16 January 1954 Scottish First Division	Hearts	5–1	St Mirren	Tynecastle Park
				Attendance: 23,000

23 January 1954 Scottish First Division	Dundee	2–4	Hearts	Dens Park
				Attendance: 25,000

30 January 1954 Scottish First Division	Hearts	0–0	Falkirk	Tynecastle Park
				Attendance: 18,000

6 February 1954 Scottish First Division	Hearts	3–2	Celtic	Tynecastle Park
				Attendance: 47,519

20 February 1954 Scottish First Division	Hearts	3–3	Rangers	Tynecastle Park
				Attendance: 49,000

6 March 1954 Scottish First Division	Raith Rovers	4–2	Hearts	Stark's Park
				Attendance: 16,000

17 March 1954 Scottish First Division	Hearts	3–0	Hamilton Academical	Tynecastle Park
				Attendance: 12,000

20 March 1954 Scottish First Division	Aberdeen	1–0	Hearts	Pittodrie Park
				Attendance: 17,000

17 April 1954 Scottish First Division	Clyde	0–1	Hearts	Shawfield Stadium
				Attendance: 15,000

19 April 1954 Scottish First Division	Partick Thistle	2–1	Hearts	Firhill Park
				Attendance: 18,000

== See also ==
- List of Heart of Midlothian F.C. seasons
