= 1968–69 Heart of Midlothian F.C. season =

Heart of Midlothian
1968–69 season
- Manager: John Harvey
- Stadium: Tynecastle Park
- Scottish First Division: 8th
- Scottish Cup: 2nd Round
- League Cup: Group Stage

During the 1968–69 season Hearts competed in the Scottish First Division, the Scottish Cup, the Scottish League Cup and the East of Scotland Shield.

== Fixtures ==
=== Friendlies ===
3 August 1968 Friendly	Middlesbrough	4–3	Hearts	Ayresome Park
	Goal			Attendance: 7,510

23 September 1968 Friendly	Sunderland	2–1	Hearts	Roker Park
	Goal			Attendance: 2,568

21 October 1968 Friendly	Hearts	2–4	Middlesbrough	Tynecastle Park
	Goal			Attendance: 6,319

14 April 1969 Friendly	Hearts	1–1	Eintracht Frankfurt	Tynecastle Park
	Goal			Attendance: 10,394

=== East of Scotland Shield ===
22 March 1969 Final	Hearts	1–1	Hibernian	Tynecastle Park
				Attendance: 14,000

26 April 1969 Final	Hibernian	1–0	Hearts	Easter Road
				Attendance: 10,000

=== League Cup ===
10 August 1968 League Cup Group	Airdrieonians	2–3	Hearts	Broomfield Park
				Attendance: 4,484

14 August 1968 League Cup Group	Hearts	2–1	Dundee	Tynecastle Park
				Attendance: 9,526

17 August 1968 League Cup Group	Kilmarnock	3–3	Hearts	Rugby Park
				Attendance: 7,213

24 August 1968 League Cup Group	Hearts	0–2	Airdrieonians	Tynecastle Park
				Attendance: 10,814

28 August 1968 League Cup Group	Dundee	4–0	Hearts	Dens Park
				Attendance: 7,715

31 August 1968 League Cup Group	Hearts	0–0	Kilmarnock	Tynecastle Park
				Attendance: 6,283

=== Scottish Cup ===
25 January 1969 Scottish Cup R1	Dundee	1–2	Hearts	Dens Park
				Attendance: 14,000

24 February 1969 Scottish Cup R2	Rangers	2–0	Hearts	Ibrox Park
				Attendance: 48,426

=== Scottish First Division ===
7 September 1968 Scottish First Division	Hibernian	1–3	Hearts	Easter Road
				Attendance: 24,110

14 September 1968 Scottish First Division	Hearts	3–1	Dunfermline Athletic	Tynecastle Park
				Attendance: 12,027

21 September 1968 Scottish First Division	Airdrieonians	2–1	Hearts	Broomfield Park
				Attendance: 5,136

28 September 1968 Scottish First Division	Hearts	1–1	Rangers	Tynecastle Park
				Attendance: 32,617

5 October 1968 Scottish First Division	Aberdeen	1–2	Hearts	Pittodrie Stadium
				Attendance: 11,579

12 October 1968 Scottish First Division	Hearts	0–1	Celtic	Tynecastle Park
				Attendance: 33,760

19 October 1968 Scottish First Division	Falkirk	1–3	Hearts	Brockville Park
				Attendance: 5,369

26 October 1968 Scottish First Division	Dundee	3–1	Hearts	Dens Park
				Attendance: 9,025

2 November 1968 Scottish First Division	Hearts	0–1	Kilmarnock	Tynecastle Park
				Attendance: 7,974

9 November 1968 Scottish First Division	Hearts	2–0	Partick Thistle	Tynecastle Park
				Attendance: 6,369

16 November 1968 Scottish First Division	Dundee United	4–2	Hearts	Tannadice Park
				Attendance: 7,914

23 November 1968 Scottish First Division	Hearts	2–2	St Johnstone	Tynecastle Park
				Attendance: 7,093

30 November 1968 Scottish First Division	Morton	0–2	Hearts	Cappielow Park
				Attendance: 4,460

7 December 1968 Scottish First Division	Hearts	2–3	Clyde	Tynecastle Park
				Attendance: 7,472

14 December 1968 Scottish First Division	Hearts	1–0	Raith Rovers	Tynecastle Park
				Attendance: 6,769

21 December 1968 Scottish First Division	Arbroath	2–3	Hearts	Gayfield Park
				Attendance: 3,022

28 December 1968 Scottish First Division	St Mirren	2–1	Hearts	St Mirren Park, Love Street
				Attendance: 8,119

1 January 1969 Scottish First Division	Hearts	0–0	Hearts	Tynecastle Park
				Attendance: 30,011

2 January 1969 Scottish First Division	Dunfermline Athletic	2–2	Hearts	East End Park
				Attendance: 15,202

4 January 1969 Scottish First Division	Hearts	1–1	Airdrieonians	Tynecastle Park
				Attendance: 8,468

11 January 1969 Scottish First Division	Rangers	2–0	Hearts	Ibrox Park
				Attendance: 41,071

18 January 1969 Scottish First Division	Hearts	3–2	Aberdeen	Tynecastle Park
				Attendance: 7,658

1 February 1969 Scottish First Division	Celtic	5–0	Hearts	Celtic Park
				Attendance: 35,321

22 February 1969 Scottish First Division	Kilmarnock	1–0	Hearts	Rugby Park
				Attendance: 7,025

1 March 1969 Scottish First Division	Partick Thistle	5–1	Hearts	Firhill Park
				Attendance: 6,982

8 March 1969 Scottish First Division	Hearts	1–0	Dundee United	Tynecastle Park
				Attendance: 6,793

12 March 1969 Scottish First Division	Hearts	2–2	Dundee	Tynecastle Park
				Attendance: 5,141

15 March 1969 Scottish First Division	St Johnstone	2–1	Hearts	Muirton Park
				Attendance: 4,351

24 March 1969 Scottish First Division	Hearts	2–2	Morton	Tynecastle Park
				Attendance: 4,539

29 March 1969 Scottish First Division	Clyde	0–1	Hearts	Shawfield Stadium
				Attendance: 1,928

2 April 1969 Scottish First Division	Hearts	2–1	Falkirk	Tynecastle Park
				Attendance: 5,241

5 April 1969 Scottish First Division	Raith Rovers	0–3	Hearts	Stark's Park
				Attendance: 5,642

12 April 1969 Scottish First Division	Hearts	2–2	Arbroath	Tynecastle Park
				Attendance: 6,144

19 April 1969 Scottish First Division	Hearts	2–1	St Mirren	Tynecastle Park
				Attendance: 8,188

== See also ==
- List of Heart of Midlothian F.C. seasons
