= 1968–69 Celtic F.C. season =

Celtic
1968–69 season
- Manager: Jock Stein
- Stadium: Celtic Park
- Scottish Division One: 1st
- Scottish Cup: Winners
- Scottish League Cup: Winners
- European Cup: Quarter-finalists

During the 1968–69 Scottish football season, Celtic competed in Scottish Division One.

Celtic won the domestic treble for only the second time in their history, as well as the second time in three seasons. They won the League for the fourth year in a row, as well as the League Cup for the fourth time in a row, which was a record at the time. With this treble, Celtic reached 50 major domestic honours.

== Squad ==
Note: Flags indicate national team as defined under FIFA eligibility rules; some limited exceptions apply. Players may hold more than one non-FIFA nationality.

No.	Pos.	Nation	Player
—	GK	SCO	John Fallon
—	GK	SCO	Ronnie Simpson
—	GK	SCO	Robert Wraith
—	DF	SCO	Jim Craig
—	DF	SCO	Tommy Gemmell
—	DF	SCO	Willie O'Neill
—	DF	SCO	Davie Cattanach
—	DF	SCO	John Gorman
—	DF	SCO	Billy McNeill
—	DF	SCO	Jim Brogan
—	DF	SCO	Jimmy Quinn
—	MF	SCO	Bobby Murdoch
—	MF	SCO	David Hay
—	MF	SCO	John Clark

No.	Pos.	Nation	Player
—	MF	IRL	Charlie Gallacher
—	MF	SCO	George Connelly
—	MF	SCO	Patrick McMahon
—	MF	SCO	Lou Macari
—	MF	SCO	Tommy Callaghan
—	MF	SCO	Bertie Auld
—	FW	SCO	Jimmy Johnstone
—	FW	SCO	Stevie Chalmers
—	FW	SCO	Bobby Lennox
—	FW	SCO	Harry Hood
—	FW	SCO	Joe McBride
—	FW	SCO	Harry Hood
—	FW	SCO	John Yogi Hughes

== Competitions ==
=== Scottish Division One ===
==== League table ====
Pos	Team	Pld	W	D	L	GF	GA	GD	Pts
1	Celtic	34	23	8	3	89	32	+57	54
2	Rangers	34	21	7	6	81	32	+49	49
3	Dunfermline Athletic	34	19	7	8	63	45	+18	45
4	Kilmarnock	34	15	14	5	50	32	+18	44
5	Dundee United	34	17	9	8	61	49	+12	43

Source: "1968-1969 First Division - SPFL Archive". SPFL.

==== Matches ====
7 September 1968 Division One	Clyde	0–3	Celtic	Glasgow
15:00				Stadium: Shawfield Stadium; Attendance: 22,063

14 September 1968 Division One	Celtic	2–4	Rangers	Glasgow
15:00				Stadium: Celtic Park; Attendance: 69,561

21 September 1968 Division One	Dunfermline Athletic	1–1	Celtic	Dunfermline
15:00				Stadium: East End Park; Attendance: 22,878

28 September 1968 Division One	Celtic	2–1	Aberdeen	Glasgow
15:00 BST				Stadium: Celtic Park; Attendance: 34,954

5 October 1968 Division One	Celtic	2–0	Dundee United	Glasgow
15:00 BST				Stadium: Celtic Park; Attendance: 43,983

12 October 1968 Division One	Hearts	0–1	Celtic	Edinburgh
15:00 BST				Stadium: Tynecastle Park; Attendance: 33,760

19 October 1968 Division One	Celtic	2–1	St Johnstone	Glasgow
15:00 BST				Stadium: Celtic Park; Attendance: 35,171

26 October 1968 Division One	Morton	1–1	Celtic	Greenock
15:00 BST				Stadium: Cappielow Park; Attendance: 18,031

2 November 1968 Division One	Celtic	3–1	Dundee	Glasgow
15:00 BST				Stadium: Celtic Park; Attendance: 34,8758

9 November 1968 Division One	Arbroath	0–5	Celtic	Glasgow
15:00 GMT				Stadium: Celtic Park; Attendance: 11,813

16 November 1968 Division One	Celtic	2–0	Raith Rovers	Glasgow
15:00 GMT				Stadium: Celtic Park; Attendance: 29,220

23 November 1968 Division One	Partick Thistle	0–4	Celtic	Glasgow
15:00 GMT				Stadium: Firhill Park; Attendance: 29,494

30 November 1968 Division One	Hibernian	2–5	Celtic	Edinburgh
15:00 GMT				Stadium: Easter Road; Attendance: 34,888

7 December 1968 Division One	Celtic	5–0	St Mirren	Glasgow
15:00 GMT				Stadium: Celtic Park; Attendance: 44,875

14 December 1968 Division One	Falkirk	0–0	Celtic	Falkirk
15:00 GMT				Stadium: Brockville Park; Attendance: 14,903

21 December 1968 Division One	Celtic	1–1	Kilmarnock	Glasgow
15:00 GMT				Stadium: Celtic Park; Attendance: 37,321

28 December 1968 Division One	Airdrieonians	0–0	Celtic	Airdrie
15:00 GMT				Stadium: Broomfield Park; Attendance: 17,855

1 January 1969 Division One	Celtic	5–0	Clyde	Glasgow
15:00 GMT				Stadium: Celtic Park; Attendance: 28,579

2 January 1969 Division One	Rangers	1–0	Celtic	Glasgow
15:00 GMT				Stadium: Ibrox Park; Attendance: 85,341

4 January 1969 Division One	Celtic	3–1	Dunfermline Athletic	Glasgow
15:00 GMT				Stadium: Celtic Park; Attendance: 40,890

11 January 1969 Division One	Aberdeen	1–3	Celtic	Aberdeen
15:00 GMT				Stadium: Pittodrie Stadium; Attendance: 30,700

18 January 1969 Division One	Dundee United	1–3	Celtic	Dundee
15:00 GMT				Stadium: Tannadice Park; Attendance: 19,539

1 February 1969 Division One	Celtic	5–0	Hearts	Glasgow
15:00 GMT				Stadium: Celtic Park; Attendance: 35,321

5 March 1969 Division One	Celtic	7–1	Arbroath	Glasgow
19:30 GMT				Stadium: Celtic Park; Attendance: 17,273

8 March 1969 Division One	Raith Rovers	1–3	Celtic	Kirkcaldy
15:00 GMT				Stadium: Stark's Park; Attendance: 13,692

15 March 1969 Division One	Celtic	1–0	Partick Thistle	Glasgow
15:00 GMT				Stadium: Celtic Park; Attendance: 27,317

24 March 1969 Division One	Celtic	1–1	Hibernian	Glasgow
19:30 GMT				Stadium: Celtic Park; Attendance: 29,001

29 March 1969 Division One	St Mirren	0–3	Celtic	Paisley
15:00 GMT				Stadium: St Mirren Park, Love Street; Attendance: 28,859

1 April 1969 Division One	St Johnstone	2–3	Celtic	Perth
19:30 GMT				Stadium: Muirton Park; Attendance: 15,775

9 April 1969 Division One	Celtic	5–2	Falkirk	Glasgow
19:30 BST				Stadium: Celtic Park; Attendance: 22,042

19 April 1969 Division One	Celtic	2–2	Airdrieonians	Glasgow
15:00 BST				Stadium: Celtic Park; Attendance: 31,926

21 April 1969 Division One	Kilmarnock	2–2	Celtic	Kilmarnock
19:30 BST				Stadium: Rugby Park; Attendance: 18,873

28 April 1969 Division One	Celtic	2–4	Morton	Glasgow
19:30 BST				Stadium: Celtic Park; Attendance: 28,267

30 April 1969 Division One	Dundee	1–2	Celtic	Dundee
19:30 BST				Stadium: Dens Park; Attendance: 10,959

=== Scottish Cup ===
25 January 1969 First round	Partick Thistle	3–3	Celtic	Glasgow
15:00 GMT				Stadium: Firhill Park; Attendance: 35,867

29 January 1969 First round replay	Celtic	8–1	Partick Thistle	Glasgow
19:30 GMT				Stadium: Celtic Park; Attendance: 48,000

12 February 1969 Second round	Clyde	0–0	Celtic	Glasgow
15:00 GMT				Stadium: Shawfield Stadium; Attendance: 25,000

24 February 1969 Second round replay	Celtic	3–0	Clyde	Glasgow
19:30 GMT				Stadium: Celtic Park; Attendance: 38,000

1 March 1969 Third round	Celtic	3–2	St Johnstone	Glasgow
15:00 GMT				Stadium: Celtic Park; Attendance: 39,500

22 March 1969 Semi-final	Celtic	4–1	Morton	Glasgow
15:00 GMT				Stadium: Hampden Park; Attendance: 48,394

26 April 1969 Final	Celtic	4–0	Rangers	Glasgow
15:00 GMT				Stadium: Hampden Park; Attendance: 132,870

=== Scottish League Cup ===
10 August 1968 Group 8	Rangers	0–2	Celtic	Glasgow
15:30 GMT				Stadium: Ibrox Park; Attendance: 78,197

14 August 1968 Group 8	Celtic	4–1	Morton	Glasgow
19:30 GMT				Stadium: Ibrox Park; Attendance: 38,803

17 August 1968 Group 8	Celtic	4–0	Partick Thistle	Glasgow
15:00 GMT				Stadium: Celtic Park; Attendance: 43,840

24 August 1968 Group 8	Celtic	1–0	Rangers	Glasgow
19:30 GMT				Stadium: Celtic Park; Attendance: 70,153

28 August 1968 Group 8	Morton	0–3	Celtic	Greenock
15:00 GMT				Stadium: Cappielow Park; Attendance: 19,714

31 August 1968 Group 8	Partick Thistle	1–6	Celtic	Glasgow
19:30 GMT				Stadium: Firhill Park; Attendance: 28,935

11 September 1968 Quarter-final 1st leg	Celtic	10–0	Hamilton Academical	Glasgow
19:30 GMT				Stadium: Celtic Park; Attendance: 23,185

25 September 1968 Quarter-final 2nd leg	Hamilton Academical	2–4 (2–14 agg.)	Celtic	Hamilton
19:45 GMT				Stadium: Douglas Park; Attendance: 3,462

9 October 1968 Semi-final	Celtic	1–0	Clyde	Glasgow
19:30 GMT				Stadium: Hampden Park; Attendance: 34,584

5 April 1969 Final	Celtic	6–2	Hibernian	Glasgow
15:00 GMT				Stadium: Hampden Park; Attendance: 74,253

=== European Cup ===
18 September 1968 1st round 1st leg	AS Saint-Etienne (France)	2–0	(Scotland) Celtic	Saint-Etienne
19:00 GMT				Stadium: Stade Geoffroy-Guichard; Attendance: 34,403

2 October 1968 1st round 2nd leg	Celtic (Scotland)	4–0 (4–2 agg.)	(France) AS Saint-Etienne	Glasgow
20:00 GMT				Stadium: Celtic Park; Attendance: 73,059

13 November 1968 2nd round 1st leg	Celtic (Scotland)	5–1	(Socialist Federal Republic of Yugoslavia) Red Star Belgrade	Glasgow
20:00 GMT				Stadium: Celtic Park; Attendance: 65,248

27 November 1968 2nd round 2nd leg	Red Star Belgrade (Socialist Federal Republic of Yugoslavia)	1–1 (1–6 agg.)	(Scotland) Celtic	Belgrade
20:00 GMT				Stadium: Red Star Stadium; Attendance: 17,625

19 February 1969 Quarter-final 1st leg	AC Milan (Italy)	0–0	(Scotland) Celtic	Milan
20:00 GMT				Stadium: San Siro; Attendance: 65,538

12 March 1969 Quarter-final 2nd leg	Celtic (Scotland)	0–1 (0–1 agg.)	(Italy) AC Milan	Glasgow
20:00 GMT				Stadium: Celtic Park; Attendance: 76,415

=== Glasgow Cup ===
11 April 1969 Semi-final	Celtic	3–4	Rangers	Glasgow
19:30 BST				Stadium: Celtic Park; Attendance: 40,000

== See also ==
- Nine in a row
