= 1953–54 Celtic F.C. season =

Celtic
1953–54 season
- Manager: Jimmy McGrory
- Stadium: Celtic Park
- Scottish Division A: 1st
- Scottish Cup: Winners
- Scottish League Cup: Group stage

During the 1953–54 Scottish football season, Celtic competed in Scottish Division A.

== Competitions ==
=== Scottish Division A ===
==== League table ====
Pos	Team	Pld	W	D	L	GF	GA	GD	Pts
1	Celtic	30	20	3	7	72	29	+43	43
2	Heart of Midlothian	30	16	6	8	70	45	+25	38
3	Partick Thistle	30	17	1	12	76	54	+22	35
4	Rangers	30	13	8	9	56	35	+21	34
5	Hibernian	30	15	4	11	72	51	+21	34

Source: RSSSF

==== Matches ====
5 September 1953 Division A	Hamilton Academical	2–0	Celtic	Hamilton
15:00 GMT				Stadium: Douglas Park; Attendance: 20,000

12 September 1953 Division A	Celtic	1–0	Clyde	Glasgow
15:00				Stadium: Celtic Park; Attendance: 23,000

19 September 1953 Division A	Rangers	1–1	Celtic	Glasgow
15:00				Stadium: Ibrox Park; Attendance: 59,000

26 September 1953 Division A	Celtic	3–0	Aberdeen	Glasgow
15:00 GMT				Stadium: Celtic Park; Attendance: 26,000

10 October 1953 Division A	Celtic	3–0	Raith Rovers	Glasgow
14:45 BST				Stadium: Celtic Park; Attendance: 20,000

17 October 1953 Division A	Queen of the South	2–1	Celtic	Dumfries
15:00 BST				Stadium: Palmerston Park; Attendance: 16,000

24 October 1953 Division A	Celtic	2–0	Hearts	Glasgow
15:00 BST				Stadium: Celtic Park; Attendance: 30,000

31 October 1953 Division A	Dundee	1–1	Celtic	Dundee
14:45 BST				Stadium: Dens Park; Attendance: 27,000

7 November 1953 Division A	Celtic	2–2	Hibernian	Glasgow
15:00 GMT				Stadium: Celtic Park; Attendance: 42,000

14 November 1953 Division A	East Fife	4–1	Celtic	Methil
14:30 GMT				Stadium: Bayview Park; Attendance: 15,000

21 November 1953 Division A	Celtic	4–1	Airdrieonains	Glasgow
15:00 GMT				Stadium: Celtic Park; Attendance: 25,000

28 November 1953 Division A	Celtic	2–1	Partick Thistle	Glasgow
15:00 GMT				Stadium: Celtic Park; Attendance: 27,000

5 December 1953 Division A	Stirling Albion	2–1	Celtic	Stirling
14:15 GMT				Stadium: Annfield; Attendance: 18,000

12 December 1953 Division A	Celtic	4–0	St Mirren	Glasgow
14:15 GMT				Stadium: Celtic Park; Attendance: 18,000

26 December 1953 Division A	Clyde	1–7	Celtic	Glasgow
15:00 GMT				Stadium: Shawfield Stadium; Attendance: 21,500

1 January 1954 Division A	Celtic	1–0	Rangers	Glasgow
14:15 GMT				Stadium: Celtic Park; Attendance: 65,000

2 January 1954 Division A	Aberdeen	2–0	Celtic	Aberdeen
14:00 GMT				Stadium: Pittodrie Park; Attendance: 28,000

9 January 1954 Division A	Celtic	1–0	Falkirk	Glasgow
15:00 GMT				Stadium: Celtic Park; Attendance: 28,000

16 January 1954 Division A	Raith Rovers	2–0	Celtic	Kirkcaldy
15:00 GMT				Stadium: Stark's Park; Attendance: 13,000

23 January 1954 Division A	Celtic	3–1	Queen of the South	Glasgow
15:00 GMT				Stadium: Celtic Park; Attendance: 28,000

6 February 1954 Division A	Hearts	3–2	Celtic	Edinburgh
15:00 GMT				Stadium: Tynecastle Park; Attendance: 47,519

20 February 1954 Division A	Celtic	5–1	Dundee	Glasgow
15:00 GMT				Stadium: Celtic Park; Attendance: 32,000

6 March 1954 Division A	Celtic	4–1	East Fife	Glasgow
15:00 GMT				Stadium: Celtic Park; Attendance: 25,000

17 March 1954 Division A	Airdrieonians	0–6	Celtic	Airdrie
15:00 GMT				Stadium: Broomfield Park; Attendance: 13,000

20 March 1954 Division A	Partick Thistle	1–3	Celtic	Glasgow
15:00 GMT				Stadium: Firhill Park; Attendance: 36,000

29 March 1954 Division A	Celtic	4–0	Stirling Albion	Glasgow
15:00 GMT				Stadium: Celtic Park; Attendance: 12,000

7 April 1954 Division A	St Mirren	1–3	Celtic	Paisley
15:00 BST				Stadium: St Mirren Park, Love Street; Attendance: 18,000

14 April 1954 Division A	Falkirk	0–3	Celtic	Falkirk
15:00 BST				Stadium: Brockville Park; Attendance: 22,000

17 April 1954 Division A	Hibernian	0–3	Celtic	Edinburgh
15:00 BST				Stadium: Easter Road; Attendance: 45,000

26 April 1954 Division A	Celtic	1–0	Hamilton Academical	Glasgow
15:00 BST				Stadium: Celtic Park; Attendance: 20,000

=== Scottish Cup ===
17 February 1954 Second round	Falkirk	1–2	Celtic	Falkirk
15:00 GMT				Stadium: Brockville Park; Attendance: 22,000

27 February 1954 Third round	Stirling Albion	3–4	Celtic	Stirling
15:00 GMT				Stadium: Annfield; Attendance: 25,750

13 March 1954 Fourth round	Hamilton Academical	1–2	Celtic	Hamilton
15:00 GMT				Stadium: Douglas Park; Attendance: 22,000

27 March 1954 Semi-final	Motherwell	2–2	Celtic	Glasgow
15:00 GMT				Stadium: Hampden Park; Attendance: 102,444

5 April 1954 Semi-final replay	Motherwell	1–3	Celtic	Glasgow
16:15 GMT				Stadium: Hampden Park; Attendance: 92,639

24 April 1954 Final	Celtic	2–1	Aberdeen	Glasgow
15:00 GMT	Alec Young 50' (o.g.); Sean Fallon 64'	Celtic Report	Paddy Buckley 51'	Stadium: Hampden Park; Attendance: 130,060; Referee: Charlie Faultless

=== Scottish League Cup ===
8 August 1953 Group 8	Celtic	0–1	Aberdeen	Glasgow
15:00 GMT				Stadium: Celtic Park; Attendance: 55,000

12 August 1953 Group 8	East Fife	1–1	Celtic	Dundee
15:00 GMT				Stadium: Bayview Park; Attendance: 16,000

15 August 1953 Group 8	Airdrieonians	2–1	Celtic	Airdrie
15:00 GMT				Stadium: Broomfield Park; Attendance: 22,000

22 August 1953 Group 8	Aberdeen	5–2	Celtic	Aberdeen
15:00 GMT				Stadium: Pittodrie Park; Attendance: 18,000

26 August 1953 Group 8	Celtic	0–1	East Fife	Glasgow
18:45 GMT				Stadium: Celtic Park; Attendance: 15,000

29 August 1953 Group 8	Celtic	2–0	Airdrieonians	Glasgow
15:00 GMT				Stadium: Celtic Park; Attendance: 18,000
