= 1954–55 Heart of Midlothian F.C. season =

Heart of Midlothian
1954–55 season
- Manager: Tommy Walker
- Stadium: Tynecastle Park
- Scottish First Division: 4th
- Scottish Cup: Round 7
- League Cup: Winners

During the 1954–55 season Hearts competed in the Scottish First Division, the Scottish Cup, the Scottish League Cup and the East of Scotland Shield.

== Fixtures ==
=== Friendlies ===
13 October 1954 Friendly	Newcastle United	2–3	Hearts	St James' Park
	Goal

18 October 1954 Friendly	Hibernian	0–2	Hearts	Easter Road
	Goal			Attendance: 25,000

3 November 1954 Friendly	Leeds United	2–4	Hearts	Elland Road
	Goal

10 November 1954 Friendly	Sunderland	3–3	Hearts	Roker Park
	Goal

=== East of Scotland Shield ===
7 May 1955 Final	Hibernian	4–3	Hearts	Easter Road

=== Penman Cup ===
13 September 1954 Round 1	East Fife	2–1	Hearts	Bayview Park

=== League Cup ===
14 August 1954 League Cup Group	Hearts	3–1	Dundee	Tynecastle Park
				Attendance: 35,000

18 August 1954 League Cup Group	Falkirk	2–6	Hearts	Brockville Park
				Attendance: 17,000

21 August 1954 League Cup Group	Celtic	1–2	Hearts	Celtic Park
				Attendance: 53,000

28 August 1954 League Cup Group	Dundee	4–1	Hearts	Dens Park
				Attendance: 29,500

1 September 1954 League Cup Group	Hearts	4–1	Falkirk	Tynecastle Park
				Attendance: 25,000

4 September 1954 League Cup Group	Hearts	3–2	Celtic	Tynecastle Park
				Attendance: 32,000

22 September 1954 League Cup Quarter-Final 1st Leg	St Johnstone	0–5	Hearts	Muirton Park
				Attendance: 12,000

25 September 1954 League Cup Quarter-Final 2nd Leg	Hearts	2–0	St Johnstone	Tynecastle Park
				Attendance: 21,000

9 October 1954 League Cup Semi-Final	Airdrieonians	1–4	Hearts	Easter Road
				Attendance: 34,127

23 October 1954 League Cup Final	Hearts	4–2	Motherwell	Hampden Park
				Attendance: 55,642

=== Scottish Cup ===
5 February 1955 Scottish Cup R5	Hearts	5–0	Hibernian	Tynecastle Park
				Attendance: 45,770

19 February 1955 Scottish Cup R6	Buckie Thistle	0–6	Hearts	Victoria Park
				Attendance: 5,400

5 March 1955 Scottish Cup R7	Hearts	1–1	Aberdeen	Tynecastle Park
				Attendance: 48,723

9 March 1955 Scottish Cup R7 Replay	Aberdeen	2–0	Hearts	Pittodrie Park
				Attendance: 41,345

=== Scottish First Division ===
11 September 1954 Scottish First Division	Hearts	5–4	Partick Thistle	Tynecastle Park
				Attendance: 30,000

18 September 1954 Scottish First Division	Hibernian	2–3	Hearts	Easter Road
				Attendance: 42,000

2 October 1954 Scottish First Division	Dundee	3–2	Hearts	Dens Park
				Attendance: 20,000

16 October 1954 Scottish First Division	East Fife	0–2	Hearts	Bayview Park
				Attendance: 12,000

30 October 1954 Scottish First Division	Stirling Albion	0–5	Hearts	Annfield Stadium
				Attendance: 12,000

6 November 1954 Scottish First Division	Hearts	5–3	Falkirk	Tynecastle Park
				Attendance: 28,000

20 November 1954 Scottish First Division	Aberdeen	3–1	Hearts	Pittodrie Park
				Attendance: 28,000

24 November 1954 Scottish First Division	Kilmarnock	1–3	Hearts	Rugby Park
				Attendance: 7,689

27 November 1954 Scottish First Division	Hearts	3–1	Queen of the South	Tynecastle Park
				Attendance: 24,000

4 December 1954 Scottish First Division	Raith Rovers	0–6	Hearts	Stark's Park
				Attendance: 12,000

11 December 1954 Scottish First Division	Clyde	0–3	Hearts	Shawfield Stadium
				Attendance: 11,000

18 December 1954 Scottish First Division	Hearts	3–4	Rangers	Tynecastle Park
				Attendance: 35,000

25 December 1954 Scottish First Division	Partick Thistle	4–4	Hearts	Firhill Park
				Attendance: 12,000

1 January 1955 Scottish First Division	Hearts	5–1	Hibernian	Tynecastle Park
				Attendance: 49,000

3 January 1955 Scottish First Division	St Mirren	1–1	Hearts	St Mirren Park, Love Street
				Attendance: 15,000

8 January 1955 Scottish First Division	Hearts	2–1	Dundee	Tynecastle Park
				Attendance: 24,000

29 January 1955 Scottish First Division	Celtic	2–0	Hearts	Celtic Park
				Attendance: 49,300

12 February 1955 Scottish First Division	Hearts	3–0	Stirling Albion	Tynecastle Park
				Attendance: 10,000

26 February 1955 Scottish First Division	Falkirk	2–2	Hearts	Brockville Park
				Attendance: 20,570

12 March 1955 Scottish First Division	Hearts	2–0	Aberdeen	Tynecastle Park
				Attendance: 36,000

19 March 1955 Scottish First Division	Queen of the South	1–1	Hearts	Palmerston Park
				Attendance: 9,500

26 March 1955 Scottish First Division	Hearts	2–0	Raith Rovers	Tynecastle Park
				Attendance: 20,000

2 April 1955 Scottish First Division	Hearts	3–0	Clyde	Tynecastle Park
				Attendance: 18,000

6 April 1955 Scottish First Division	Hearts	2–2	Kilmarnock	Tynecastle Park
				Attendance: 15,000

9 April 1955 Scottish First Division	Rangers	2–1	Hearts	Ibrox Park
				Attendance: 30,000

13 April 1955 Scottish First Division	Hearts	1–3	East Fife	Tynecastle Park
				Attendance: 12,000

16 April 1955 Scottish First Division	Motherwell	1–1	Hearts	Fir Park
				Attendance: 12,000

18 April 1955 Scottish First Division	Hearts	3–2	Motherwell	Tynecastle Park
				Attendance: 12,000

22 April 1955 Scottish First Division	Hearts	1–1	St Mirren	Tynecastle Park
				Attendance: 12,000

30 April 1955 Scottish First Division	Hearts	0–3	Celtic	Tynecastle Park
				Attendance: 22,000

== See also ==
- List of Heart of Midlothian F.C. seasons
