= 1980–81 Scottish Football League =

Scottish football season

Statistics of the Scottish Football League in season 1980–81.

== Scottish Premier Division ==
Pos	Team	Pld	W	D	L	GF	GA	GD	Pts	Qualification or relegation
1	Celtic (C)	36	26	4	6	84	37	+47	56	Qualification for the European Cup first round
2	Aberdeen	36	19	11	6	61	26	+35	49	Qualification for the UEFA Cup first round
3	Rangers	36	16	12	8	60	32	+28	44	Qualification for the Cup Winners' Cup first round
4	St Mirren	36	18	8	10	56	47	+9	44	
5	Dundee United	36	17	9	10	66	42	+24	43	Qualification for the UEFA Cup first round
6	Partick Thistle	36	10	10	16	32	48	−16	30	
7	Airdrieonians	36	10	9	17	36	55	−19	29	
8	Morton	36	10	8	18	36	58	−22	28	
9	Kilmarnock (R)	36	5	9	22	23	65	−42	19	Relegation to the 1981–82 Scottish First Division
10	Heart of Midlothian (R)	36	6	6	24	27	71	−44	18	Relegation to the 1981–82 Scottish First Division

Source: Statto
Rules for classification: 1) points; 2) goal difference; 3) number of goals scored.
(C) Champions; (R) Relegated

== Scottish First Division ==
Pos	Team	Pld	W	D	L	GF	GA	GD	Pts	Promotion or relegation
1	Hibernian (C, P)	39	24	9	6	67	24	+43	57	Promotion to the Premier Division
2	Dundee (P)	39	22	8	9	64	40	+24	52	Promotion to the Premier Division
3	St Johnstone	39	21	10	8	64	44	+20	52	
4	Raith Rovers	39	20	10	9	49	32	+17	50	
5	Motherwell	39	19	11	9	65	51	+14	49	
6	Ayr United	39	17	11	11	59	42	+17	45	
7	Hamilton Academical	39	15	7	17	61	57	+4	37	
8	Dumbarton	39	13	11	15	49	50	−1	37	
9	Falkirk	39	13	8	18	39	52	−13	34	
10	Clydebank	39	10	13	16	48	59	−11	33	
11	East Stirlingshire	39	6	16	17	39	57	−18	28	
12	Dunfermline Athletic	39	10	7	22	41	58	−17	27	
13	Stirling Albion (R)	39	6	11	22	19	48	−29	23	Relegation to the Second Division
14	Berwick Rangers (R)	39	5	11	23	30	82	−52	21	Relegation to the Second Division

Source: RSSSF
Rules for classification: 1) points; 2) goal difference; 3) number of goals scored.
(C) Champions; (P) Promoted; (R) Relegated

== Scottish Second Division ==
Pos	Team	Pld	W	D	L	GF	GA	GD	Pts	Promotion
1	Queen's Park (C, P)	39	16	18	5	62	43	+19	50	Promotion to the First Division
2	Queen of the South (P)	39	16	14	9	66	53	+13	46	Promotion to the First Division
3	Cowdenbeath	39	18	9	12	63	48	+15	45	
4	Brechin City	39	15	14	10	52	46	+6	44	
5	Forfar Athletic	39	17	9	13	63	57	+6	43	
6	Alloa Athletic	39	15	12	12	61	54	+7	42	
7	Montrose	39	16	8	15	66	55	+11	40	
8	Clyde	39	14	12	13	68	63	+5	40	
9	Arbroath	39	13	12	14	58	54	+4	38	
10	Stenhousemuir	39	13	11	15	63	58	+5	37	
11	East Fife	39	10	15	14	44	53	−9	35	
12	Albion Rovers	39	13	9	17	59	72	−13	35	
13	Meadowbank Thistle	39	11	7	21	42	64	−22	29	
14	Stranraer	39	7	8	24	36	83	−47	22	

Source: "1980-1981 Second Division - SPFL Archive". SPFL.
Rules for classification: 1) points; 2) goal difference; 3) number of goals scored.
(C) Champions; (P) Promoted

== See also ==
- 1980–81 in Scottish football
