= Jack Allister (Scottish footballer) =

Scottish footballer

Personal information
- Full name: John Grandison Allister
- Date of birth: 30 June 1927
- Place of birth: Edinburgh, Scotland
- Date of death: 11 February 1999 (aged 71)
- Place of death: Edinburgh, Scotland
- Height: 5 ft 9 in (1.75 m)
- Position: Right half

Senior career*
Years	Team	Apps	(Gls)
- Tranent
1951–1952	Chelsea	4	(1)
1952–1958	Aberdeen	117	(17)
1958	Chesterfield		
1958–1959	Elgin City		
1959	Hamilton Italo-Canadians		
1959–1961	Deveronvale		
Total		121	(18)
- * Club domestic league appearances and goals

John Grandison Allister (30 June 1927 – 11 February 1999) was a Scottish professional footballer who played as a right half for Chelsea and Aberdeen.

Allister was born in Edinburgh and played junior football with Tranent before starting his professional career with Chelsea. After a year and only four games for Chelsea, he returned north and signed for Aberdeen in 1952, where he remained until 1958. In the summer of 1959, he played in the National Soccer League with Hamilton Italo-Canadians. He later joined Deveronvale, the Banff-based Scottish Highland Football League club.

== Career statistics ==
=== Club ===
Appearances and goals by club, season and competition

Club	Season	League			National Cup		League Cup		Europe		Total	
Club	Season	Division	Apps	Goals	Apps	Goals	Apps	Goals	Apps	Goals	Apps	Goals
Chelsea	1951-52	First Division	4	1	0	0	0	0	0	0	4	1
Chelsea	Total		4	1	0	0	0	0	0	0	4	1
Aberdeen	1952–53	Scottish Division One	25	2	9	2	0	0	0	0	34	4
Aberdeen	1953–54	Scottish Division One	26	5	5	1	6	1	0	0	37	7
Aberdeen	1954–55	Scottish Division One	21	4	6	1	5	0	0	0	32	5
Aberdeen	1955–56	Scottish Division One	22	0	1	0	2	0	0	0	25	0
Aberdeen	1956–57	Scottish Division One	20	6	0	0	4	0	0	0	24	6
Aberdeen	1957–58	Scottish Division One	3	0	0	0	8	1	0	0	11	1
Aberdeen	Total		117	17	21	4	25	2	0	0	163	23

== Honours ==
Aberdeen

- Scottish Football League: 1954–55
- Scottish Cup: Runner-up 1953, 1954
