= Sean Sweeney =

Sean Sweeney may refer to:

- Sean Sweeney (footballer, born 1956), Scottish footballer
- Sean Sweeney (footballer, born 1969), Scottish footballer
- Sean Sweeney (basketball) (born 1984), American basketball coach

== See also ==
- Seán McSweeney (1935–2018), Irish painter
- Shane Sweeney, character from the British TV soap Hollyoaks
- Shawn Sweeney (disambiguation)
