= John Mailer =

John Mailer may refer to:

- John Mailer (footballer), Scottish footballer
- John Buffalo Mailer, American author, playwright, actor, producer, and journalist
