= Shawn Sweeney =

Shawn Sweeney may refer to:

- Shawn Sweeney (New Hampshire politician), member of the New Hampshire House of Representatives, 2012–2016
- Shawn Sweeney (Vermont politician), member of the Vermont House of Representatives from 2025

== See also ==
- Sean Sweeney (disambiguation)
