= 1980–81 Scottish First Division =

Scottish First Division
- Season: 1980–81
- Champions: Hibs
- Promoted: Hibs; Dundee
- Relegated: Stirling Albion; Berwick Rangers
- Top goalscorer: Ally McCoist (22)

The 1980–81 Scottish First Division season was won by Hibs by six points over nearest rival Dundee.

== League table ==
Pos	Team	Pld	W	D	L	GF	GA	GD	Pts	Promotion or relegation
1	Hibernian (C, P)	39	24	9	6	67	24	+43	57	Promotion to the Premier Division
2	Dundee (P)	39	22	8	9	64	40	+24	52	Promotion to the Premier Division
3	St Johnstone	39	21	10	8	64	44	+20	52	
4	Raith Rovers	39	20	10	9	49	32	+17	50	
5	Motherwell	39	19	11	9	65	51	+14	49	
6	Ayr United	39	17	11	11	59	42	+17	45	
7	Hamilton Academical	39	15	7	17	61	57	+4	37	
8	Dumbarton	39	13	11	15	49	50	−1	37	
9	Falkirk	39	13	8	18	39	52	−13	34	
10	Clydebank	39	10	13	16	48	59	−11	33	
11	East Stirlingshire	39	6	16	17	39	57	−18	28	
12	Dunfermline Athletic	39	10	7	22	41	58	−17	27	
13	Stirling Albion (R)	39	6	11	22	19	48	−29	23	Relegation to the Second Division
14	Berwick Rangers (R)	39	5	11	23	30	82	−52	21	Relegation to the Second Division

Source: RSSSF
Rules for classification: 1) points; 2) goal difference; 3) number of goals scored.
(C) Champions; (P) Promoted; (R) Relegated

== Promotion ==
Hibs and Dundee finished first and second respectively and were promoted to the 1981–82 Scottish Premier Division.

== Relegation ==
Stirling Albion and Berwick Rangers finished 13th and 14th respectively and were relegated to the 1981–82 Scottish Second Division. In a Scottish League record Stirling failed to score in their last 14 league matches - their last goal of the league season was on 31 January in a 1-0 win over Dunfermline. They then only scored in 2 of their first 7 league games the following season.
