= Kirkie Lawson =

Scottish footballer

Personal information
- Position: Forward

Youth career
- Blantyre Victoria

Senior career*
Years	Team	Apps	(Gls)
1970–1973	Motherwell	65	(14)
1973–1976	Falkirk	84	(18)
1976–1977	Hamilton Academical	26	(6)
- Shettleston
Total		175	(38)
- * Club domestic league appearances and goals

Kirkie Lawson is a Scottish former professional footballer who played as a forward.

== Career ==
Lawson played for Blantyre Victoria, Motherwell, Falkirk, Hamilton Academical and Shettleston.
