= David Kenny (footballer, born 1962) =

Scottish footballer

Personal information
- Date of birth: 16 November 1962 (age 63)
- Place of birth: Glasgow, Scotland
- Position: Winger

Senior career*
Years	Team	Apps	(Gls)
1980–1982	Celtic	0	(0)
1981	Dumbarton	1	(1)
1982–1983	Partick Thistle	13	(1)
1983–1987	Apollon Limassol		
1987–1988	APOEL		
1988–1991	Aris Limassol		
1991–1993	Apollon Limassol		
Total		14	(2)
- * Club domestic league appearances and goals

David Kenny (born 16 November 1962) is a Scottish former professional footballer who played as a winger.

== Career ==
Kenny played for Celtic, Dumbarton, Partick Thistle, Apollon Limassol and APOEL.
