= 1954–55 Scottish Division B =

Scottish Division B
- Season: 1954–55
- Champions: Airdrieonians
- Promoted: Airdrieonians; Dunfermline Athletic

The 1954–55 Scottish Division B was won by Airdrieonians who, along with second placed Dunfermline Athletic, were promoted to Division One. Brechin City finished bottom.

== Table ==
Pos	Team	Pld	W	D	L	GF	GA	GD	Pts	Promotion or relegation
1	Airdrieonians	30	18	10	2	103	61	+42	46	Promotion to the 1955–56 Division One
2	Dunfermline Athletic	30	19	4	7	72	40	+32	42	Promotion to the 1955–56 Division One
3	Hamilton Academical	30	17	5	8	74	51	+23	39	
4	Queen's Park	30	15	5	10	65	36	+29	35	
5	Third Lanark	30	13	7	10	63	49	+14	33	
6	Stenhousemuir	30	12	8	10	70	51	+19	32	
7	St Johnstone	30	15	2	13	60	51	+9	32	
8	Ayr United	30	14	4	12	61	73	−12	32	
9	Morton	30	12	5	13	58	69	−11	29	
10	Forfar Athletic	30	11	6	13	63	80	−17	28	
11	Albion Rovers	30	8	10	12	50	69	−19	26	
12	Arbroath	30	8	8	14	55	72	−17	24	
13	Dundee United	30	8	6	16	55	70	−15	22	
14	Cowdenbeath	30	8	5	17	55	72	−17	21	
15	Alloa Athletic	30	7	6	17	51	75	−24	20	
16	Brechin City	30	8	3	19	53	89	−36	19	

Source: "1954-1955 Division B - SPFL Archive". SPFL.
