= Gerry Marshall (footballer) =

Scottish footballer

Personal information
- Full name: Gerald George Marshall
- Date of birth: 17 August 1955 (age 71)
- Position: Centre forward

Youth career
- Dalry Thistle

Senior career*
Years	Team	Apps	(Gls)
1973–1980	Clyde	115	(23)
1980–1982	Dumbarton	2	(0)
- * Club domestic league appearances and goals

Gerald George Marshall (born 17 August 1955) was a Scottish footballer who played for Dumbarton and Clyde.
