= 1992–93 Falkirk F.C. season =

Falkirk
1992–93 season
- Manager: Jim Jefferies
- Stadium: Brockville Park
- Scottish Premier Division: 11th (relegated)
- Scottish Cup: Quarter-final
- Scottish League Cup: Quarter-final
- Highest home attendance: 13,012 vs Celtic, Scottish Cup, 6 February 1993
- Lowest home attendance: 2,403 vs Forfar Athletic, League Cup, 12 August 1992
- Average home league attendance: 5,769

During the 1992–93 season, Falkirk competed in the Scottish Premier Division, in which they finished 11th and were subsequently relegated to the Scottish First Division.

== Scottish Premier Division ==
=== League table ===
| Pos | Team | Pld | W | D | L | GF | GA | GD | Pts | Qualification or relegation |
|---|---|---|---|---|---|---|---|---|---|---|
| 8 | Partick Thistle | 44 | 12 | 12 | 20 | 50 | 71 | −21 | 36 | |
| 9 | Motherwell | 44 | 11 | 13 | 20 | 46 | 62 | −16 | 35 | |
| 10 | Dundee | 44 | 11 | 12 | 21 | 48 | 68 | −20 | 34 | |
| 11 | Falkirk (R) | 44 | 11 | 7 | 26 | 60 | 86 | −26 | 29 | Relegation to the 1993–94 Scottish First Division |
| 12 | Airdrieonians (R) | 44 | 6 | 17 | 21 | 35 | 70 | −35 | 29 | Relegation to the 1993–94 Scottish First Division |

Source: RSSSF
Rules for classification: 1) points; 2) goal difference; 3) number of goals scored.
(R) Relegated

=== Matches ===
| Win | Draw | Loss |

Scottish Premier Division results
| Date | Opponent | Venue | Result F–A | Scorers | Attendance |
|---|---|---|---|---|---|
| 1 August 1992 | Dundee | A | 2–1 | Sloan, Drinkell | 8,914 |
| 5 August 1992 | Heart of Midlothian | A | 0–3 | | 8,198 |
| 8 August 1992 | Aberdeen | H | 0–1 | | 5,925 |
| 15 August 1992 | Hibernian | H | 2–1 | May, McQueen (pen.) | 6,024 |
| 22 August 1992 | Airdrieonians | A | 0–2 | | 3,900 |
| 29 August 1992 | Dundee United | A | 0–2 | | 6,444 |
| 5 September 1992 | Partick Thistle | H | 0–1 | | 5,691 |
| 12 September 1992 | St Johnstone | A | 2–3 | Smith, McLaughlin | 4,361 |
| 19 September 1992 | Celtic | H | 4–5 | McQueen (pen.), McCail (2), May | 9,678 |
| 26 September 1992 | Motherwell | H | 1–0 | Sloan | 4,275 |
| 3 October 1992 | Rangers | A | 0–4 | | 40,691 |
| 10 October 1992 | Dundee | H | 2–2 | May, McQueen | 4,818 |
| 17 October 1992 | Aberdeen | A | 1–3 | Sloan | 9,016 |
| 24 October 1992 | Dundee United | H | 1–1 | Sloan | 4,473 |
| 31 October 1992 | Partick Thistle | A | 2–1 | May (pen.), Cadette | 5,535 |
| 7 November 1992 | Airdrieonians | H | 5–1 | Drinkell (2), Cadette, Lennox, May | 4,715 |
| 14 November 1992 | Hibernian | A | 1–3 | Lennox | 7,237 |
| 21 November 1992 | Celtic | A | 2–3 | Drinkell, McAllister | 15,978 |
| 28 November 1992 | St Johnstone | H | 2–2 | Duffy (2) | 4,565 |
| 2 December 1992 | Heart of Midlothian | H | 2–1 | McCall, Drinkell | 5,475 |
| 5 December 1992 | Motherwell | A | 1–3 | Cadette | 5,018 |
| 12 December 1992 | Rangers | H | 1–2 | Wishart | 11,585 |
| 19 December 1992 | Dundee | A | 1–2 | Cadette | 6,066 |
| 26 December 1992 | Hibernian | H | 3–3 | Cadette, Drinkell, McCall | 6,925 |
| 2 January 1993 | Airdrieonians | A | 1–0 | Duffy | 5,748 |
| 23 January 1993 | Dundee United | A | 1–2 | Duffy | 5,626 |
| 30 January 1993 | Aberdeen | H | 1–4 | McCall | 6,886 |
| 2 February 1993 | Partick Thistle | H | 4–2 | Taylor, McAllister (2), Duffy | 4,690 |
| 9 February 1993 | Rangers | A | 0–5 | | 37,780 |
| 13 February 1993 | Heart of Midlothian | A | 1–3 | Cadette | 7,700 |
| 20 February 1993 | Motherwell | H | 1–3 | McCall | 4,536 |
| 27 February 1993 | Celtic | H | 0–3 | | 8,165 |
| 10 March 1993 | Dundee | H | 1–0 | Cadette | 3,454 |
| 13 March 1993 | Aberdeen | A | 2–2 | Drinkell, Johnston | 9,095 |
| 16 March 1993 | St Johnstone | A | 0–1 | | 3,546 |
| 20 March 1993 | Airdrieonians | H | 0–1 | | 4,172 |
| 27 March 1993 | Hibernian | A | 1–1 | Sloan | 5,168 |
| 3 April 1993 | Dundee United | H | 1–2 | Shaw | 3,599 |
| 10 April 1993 | Partick Thistle | A | 1–0 | May | 4,677 |
| 17 April 1993 | St Johnstone | H | 2–2 | Sloan, Shaw | 3,860 |
| 20 April 1993 | Celtic | A | 0–1 | | 10,151 |
| 1 May 1993 | Heart of Midlothian | H | 6–0 | Weir, Wishart, Baptie (2), Rice, Cadette | 4,124 |
| 8 May 1993 | Motherwell | A | 1–2 | Rice | 8,577 |
| 15 May 1993 | Rangers | H | 1–2 | McQueen (pen.) | 9,288 |

== Scottish Cup ==
| Win | Draw | Loss |

Scottish Cup results
| Round | Date | Opponent | Venue | Result F–A | Scorers | Attendance |
|---|---|---|---|---|---|---|
| Third round | 27 January 1993 | Berwick Rangers | H | 5–2 | Sloan (2), McCall, May, Cadette | 4,500 |
| Fourth round | 6 February 1993 | Celtic | H | 2–0 | Duffy, May | 13,012 |
| Quarter-final | 6 March 1993 | Heart of Midlothian | A | 0–2 | | 12,721 |

== Scottish League Cup ==
| Win | Draw | Loss |

Scottish League Cup results
| Round | Date | Opponent | Venue | Result F–A | Scorers | Attendance |
|---|---|---|---|---|---|---|
| Second round | 12 August 1992 | Forfar Athletic | H | 4–1 | Drinkell, Smith May, McAllister | 2,403 |
| Third round | 19 August 1992 | Motherwell | A | 1–0 | Drinkell | 5,510 |
| Quarter-final | 26 August 1992 | Aberdeen | H | 1–4 | McQueen | 8,022 |
