= 1994–95 Falkirk F.C. season =

Falkirk
1994–95 season
- Manager: Jim Jefferies
- Stadium: Brockville Park
- Scottish Premier Division: 5th
- Scottish Cup: Third round
- Scottish League Cup: Quarter-final

During the 1994–95 season, Falkirk competed in the Scottish Premier Division, in which they finished 5th.

== Scottish Premier Division ==
=== League table ===
Pos	Team	Pld	W	D	L	GF	GA	GD	Pts	Qualification or relegation
3	Hibernian	36	12	17	7	49	37	+12	53	
4	Celtic	36	11	18	7	39	33	+6	51	Qualification for the Cup Winners' Cup first round (Note: Celtic qualified for the 1995–96 UEFA Cup Winners' Cup by winning the 1994–95 Scottish Cup.)
5	Falkirk	36	12	12	12	48	47	+1	48	
6	Heart of Midlothian	36	12	7	17	44	51	−7	43	
7	Kilmarnock	36	11	10	15	40	48	−8	43	

Updated to match(es) played on end of season. Source: Soccerbase
Rules for classification: 1) Points; 2) Goal difference; 3) Goals scored

=== Matches ===
Win	Draw	Loss

Scottish Premier Division results
Date	Opponent	Venue	Result F–A	Scorers	Attendance
13 August 1994	Celtic	H	1–1	McCall	12,635
20 August 1994	Aberdeen	A	2–2	Cadette, McDonald	11,143
27 August 1994	Partick Thistle	H	2–1	Fulton, Cadette	5,402
10 September 1994	Kilmarnock	A	1–1	Cadette	8,021
17 September 1994	Rangers	H	0–2		12,419
24 September 1994	Dundee United	A	0–1		6,899
1 October 1994	Heart of Midlothian	H	2–1	McLaughin, McAvennie	7,589
8 October 1994	Motherwell	A	3–5	Clark (2), McAvennie	6,239
15 October 1994	Hibernian	H	0–0		7,388
22 October 1994	Celtic	A	2–0	Henderson, Clark	23,688
29 October 1994	Partick Thistle	A	2–1	Clark, May	4,215
5 November 1994	Aberdeen	H	2–1	Cramb, McGowan	6,185
8 November 1994	Kilmarnock	H	3–3	Clark (2), Henderson	6,134
19 November 1994	Rangers	A	1–1	Henderson	44,018
26 November 1994	Dundee United	H	1–3	Henderson	5,933
3 December 1994	Heart of Midlothian	A	1–1	McDonald	8,960
10 December 1994	Hibernian	A	2–2	McDonald, Rice (pen)	7,725
26 December 1994	Motherwell	H	0–1		7,937
31 December 1994	Celtic	A	0–2		21,294
7 January 1995	Aberdeen	A	0–0		14,141
14 January 1995	Rangers	H	2–3	McDonald, May	12,507
17 January 1995	Partick Thistle	H	1–3	MacKenzie	3,958
21 January 1995	Kilmarnock	A	1–2	Clark	7,648
4 February 1995	Heart of Midlothian	H	2–0	Fulton, Henderson	6,028
21 February 1995	Dundee United	A	0–1		6,457
25 February 1995	Hibernian	H	1–0	Kirk	6,501
7 March 1995	Motherwell	A	2–2	McLaughin, Kirk	6,100
11 March 1995	Rangers	A	2–2	McDonald 2	43,359
25 March 1995	Kilmarnock	H	2–0	Kirk, McDonald	5,714
1 April 1995	Heart of Midlothian	A	1–0	McGrillen	9,003
8 April 1995	Dundee United	H	3–1	M. Johnston, Kirk, McDonald	5,894
15 April 1995	Motherwell	H	3–0	Kirk, Weir, Fulton	5,756
19 April 1995	Hibernian	A	2–0	Clark, McDonald	5,450
29 April 1995	Celtic	H	1–2	Rice	9,714
6 May 1995	Partick Thistle	A	0–0		5,927
13 May 1995	Aberdeen	H	0–2		12,835

== Scottish Cup ==
Win	Draw	Loss

Scottish Cup results
Round	Date	Opponent	Venue	Result F–A	Scorers	Attendance
Third round	6 February 1995	Motherwell	H	0–2		7,552

== Scottish League Cup ==
Win	Draw	Loss

Scottish League Cup results
Round	Date	Opponent	Venue	Result F–A	Scorers	Attendance
Second round	16 August 1994	Montrose	H	1–1 (a.e.t.) (5–4 p)	Cadette	2,467
Third round	31 August 1994	Rangers	A	2–1	Cadette (2)	40,741
Quarter-final	21 September 1994	Aberdeen	H	1–4	McDonald	9,450
