= 1953–54 Scottish Division A =

48th season of top-tier football league in Scotland

Scottish Division A
- Season: 1953–54
- Champions: Celtic
- Relegated: Airdrieonians; Hamilton Academical

The 1953–54 Scottish Division A was won by Celtic, who finished five points ahead of the second placed club Heart of Midlothian. Celtic won their 20th league title with a match still to play, when they defeated Hibernian 3–0 at Easter Road on 17 April 1954. It was the club's first league championship win in 16 years. Airdrieonians and Hamilton Academical finished 15th and 16th respectively and were relegated to the 1954–55 Scottish Division B.

== League table ==
Pos	Team	Pld	W	D	L	GF	GA	GD	Pts
1	Celtic	30	20	3	7	72	29	+43	43
2	Heart of Midlothian	30	16	6	8	70	45	+25	38
3	Partick Thistle	30	17	1	12	76	54	+22	35
4	Rangers	30	13	8	9	56	35	+21	34
5	Hibernian	30	15	4	11	72	51	+21	34
6	East Fife	30	13	8	9	55	45	+10	34
7	Dundee	30	14	6	10	46	47	−1	34
8	Clyde	30	15	4	11	64	67	−3	34
9	Aberdeen	30	15	3	12	66	51	+15	33
10	Queen of the South	30	14	4	12	72	58	+14	32
11	St Mirren	30	12	4	14	44	54	−10	28
12	Raith Rovers	30	10	6	14	56	60	−4	26
13	Falkirk	30	9	7	14	47	61	−14	25
14	Stirling Albion	30	10	4	16	39	62	−23	24
15	Airdrieonians	30	5	5	20	41	92	−51	15
16	Hamilton Academical	30	4	3	23	29	94	−65	11

Source: RSSSF

== Results ==
Home \ Away	ABE	AIR	CEL	CLY	DND	EFI	FAL	HAM	HOM	HIB	PAR	QOS	RAI	RAN	STM	STI
Aberdeen		5–0	2–0	5–3	1–1	1–0	0–1	5–1	1–0	1–3	2–1	2–0	2–0	1–1	0–3	8–0
Airdrieonians	1–3		0–6	3–4	2–2	3–2	2–2	5–0	2–1	2–2	3–6	1–1	1–2	2–0	1–3	1–1
Celtic	3–0	4–1		1–0	5–1	4–1	1–0	1–0	2–0	2–2	2–1	3–1	3–0	1–0	4–0	4–0
Clyde	2–4	4–1	1–7		2–0	3–1	4–1	4–1	0–1	3–6	0–4	2–0	4–2	2–5	4–2	1–1
Dundee	4–2	1–0	1–1	2–0		1–1	1–0	3–2	2–4	1–0	6–0	4–1	0–0	1–0	2–0	2–1
East Fife	2–0	1–0	4–1	3–1	1–1		4–1	4–0	2–2	1–3	4–1	4–0	1–1	2–1	2–0	2–1
Falkirk	2–2	4–1	0–3	1–1	4–0	3–3		2–2	1–3	2–4	2–2	0–4	0–3	4–3	4–0	2–0
Hamilton Academical	3–2	0–1	2–0	1–3	2–3	0–1	2–1		1–5	2–6	1–3	0–5	2–1	1–1	0–2	0–1
Heart of Midlothian	3–2	4–3	3–2	1–2	2–1	2–2	0–0	3–0		4–0	0–2	1–4	5–1	3–3	5–1	6–1
Hibernian	3–0	8–1	0–3	4–0	2–0	2–1	2–3	4–1	1–2		1–2	1–0	5–0	2–2	2–1	1–2
Partick Thistle	6–3	9–0	1–3	3–4	1–0	0–1	5–1	4–0	2–1	0–2		1–2	5–3	0–1	2–0	3–1
Queen of the South	2–4	6–2	2–1	1–2	5–1	5–0	5–3	2–2	2–2	3–2	2–6		5–1	2–1	4–0	4–1
Raith Rovers	3–1	5–1	2–0	3–4	1–2	2–2	0–2	5–0	4–2	4–0	4–1	1–1		1–2	1–2	1–1
Rangers	1–3	3–0	1–1	1–1	2–0	2–0	3–0	8–1	0–1	3–0	3–0	2–0	2–2		1–1	3–1
St Mirren	1–4	1–0	1–3	0–1	3–0	1–1	1–0	3–2	1–1	3–3	1–3	5–3	3–0	0–1		3–0
Stirling Albion	1–0	2–1	2–1	2–2	2–3	3–2	0–1	6–0	0–3	2–1	1–2	3–0	1–3	2–0	0–2	

Legend: Blue = home team win; Yellow = draw; Red = away team win.
