= Sean Sweeney (footballer, born 1956) =

Scottish footballer (born 1956)

Personal information
- Full name: Sean Sweeney
- Date of birth: 15 July 1956 (age 70)
- Position: Forward

Senior career*
Years	Team	Apps	(Gls)
1975–1978	Clyde	48	(12)
1978–1981	Stenhousemuir	40	(12)
1980–1981	Dumbarton	1	(0)
1981–1986	Stranraer	118	(38)
- * Club domestic league appearances and goals

Sean Sweeney (born 15 June 1956) was a Scottish footballer who played for Clyde, Stenhousemuir, Dumbarton and Stranraer.
