= Ally McRoberts =

Scottish footballer

Personal information
- Position: Forward

Senior career*
Years	Team	Apps	(Gls)
1972–1977	Airdrieonians	93	(31)
1977–1981	Falkirk	129	(35)
1981–1982	Dumbarton	8	(0)
1982–1983	Stirling Albion	21	(1)
1983	Stenhousemuir	6	(1)
- Darvel
Total		257	(68)
- * Club domestic league appearances and goals

Ally McRoberts is a Scottish former footballer who played for Airdrieonians, Falkirk, Dumbarton, Stirling Albion and Stenhousemuir, as a forward.
