= 1981–82 Scottish Second Division =

Scottish Second Division
- Season: 1981–82
- Champions: Clyde
- Promoted: Clyde; Alloa Athletic

The 1981–82 Scottish Second Division was won by Clyde who, along with second placed Alloa Athletic, were promoted to the First Division. Stranraer finished bottom.

== Table ==
Pos	Team	Pld	W	D	L	GF	GA	GD	Pts	Promotion
1	Clyde (C, P)	39	24	11	4	79	38	+41	59	Promotion to the First Division
2	Alloa Athletic (P)	39	19	12	8	66	42	+24	50	Promotion to the First Division
3	Arbroath	39	20	10	9	62	50	+12	50	
4	Berwick Rangers	39	20	8	11	66	38	+28	48	
5	Brechin City	39	18	10	11	61	43	+18	46	
6	Forfar Athletic	39	15	15	9	59	35	+24	45	
7	East Fife	39	14	9	16	48	51	−3	37	
8	Stirling Albion	39	12	11	16	39	44	−5	35	
9	Cowdenbeath	39	11	13	15	51	57	−6	35	
10	Montrose	39	12	8	19	49	74	−25	32	
11	Albion Rovers	39	13	5	21	52	74	−22	31	
12	Meadowbank Thistle	39	10	10	19	49	62	−13	30	
13	Stenhousemuir	39	11	6	22	41	65	−24	28	
14	Stranraer	39	7	6	26	36	85	−49	20	

Source: "1981-1982 Second Division - SPFL Archive". SPFL.
Rules for classification: 1) points; 2) goal difference; 3) number of goals scored.
(C) Champions; (P) Promoted
