= John Donnelly (footballer, born 1961) =

Scottish footballer

Personal information
- Full name: John Donnelly
- Date of birth: 8 March 1961 (age 65)
- Place of birth: Glasgow, Scotland
- Position: Midfielder

Youth career
- Notts County

Senior career*
Years	Team	Apps	(Gls)
1979–1980	Motherwell	25	(2)
1980–1983	Dumbarton	78	(18)
1983–1985	Leeds United	40	(4)
1985–1987	Partick Thistle	45	(17)
1987–1988	Dunfermline Athletic	34	(7)
1988	→ East Fife (loan)	4	(0)
1988–1989	Stranraer	17	(1)
- Vale of Clyde
Total		243	(44)
- * Club domestic league appearances and goals

John Donnelly (born 8 March 1961) is a Scottish footballer, who played for Motherwell, Dumbarton, Leeds United, Partick Thistle, Dunfermline Athletic, East Fife and Stranraer.
