= 1968–69 Scottish League Cup =

Tournament details
- Country: Scotland

Final positions
- Champions: Celtic
- Runners-up: Hibernian

The 1968–69 Scottish League Cup was the twenty-third season of Scotland's second football knockout competition. The competition was won for the fourth successive season by Celtic, who defeated Hibernian in the Final.

== First round ==
=== Group 1 ===
Team	Pld	W	D	L	GF	GA	GR	Pts
Hibernian	6	4	1	1	10	3	3.333	9
Raith Rovers	6	2	2	2	7	8	0.875	6
St Johnstone	6	1	3	2	8	9	0.889	5
Falkirk	6	1	2	3	8	13	0.615	4

Home team	Score	Away team	Date
Falkirk	1–1	Raith Rovers	10 August 1968
Hibernian	0–1	St Johnstone	10 August 1968
Raith Rovers	0–1	Hibernian	14 August 1968
St Johnstone	2–3	Falkirk	14 August 1968
Hibernian	2–0	Falkirk	17 August 1968
St Johnstone	0–0	Raith Rovers	17 August 1968
Raith Rovers	4–2	Falkirk	24 August 1968
St Johnstone	2–2	Hibernian	24 August 1968
Falkirk	2–2	St Johnstone	28 August 1968
Hibernian	3–0	Raith Rovers	28 August 1968
Falkirk	0–2	Hibernian	31 August 1968
Raith Rovers	2–1	St Johnstone	31 August 1968

=== Group 2 ===
Team	Pld	W	D	L	GF	GA	GR	Pts
Dundee	6	3	2	1	15	5	3.000	8
Airdrieonians	6	3	1	2	10	7	1.429	7
Heart of Midlothian	6	2	2	2	8	12	0.667	6
Kilmarnock	6	0	3	3	5	14	0.357	3

Home team	Score	Away team	Date
Airdrieonians	2–3	Heart of Midlothian	10 August 1968
Dundee	4–0	Kilmarnock	10 August 1968
Heart of Midlothian	2–1	Dundee	14 August 1968
Kilmarnock	0–3	Airdrieonians	14 August 1968
Dundee	1–1	Airdrieonians	17 August 1968
Kilmarnock	3–3	Heart of Midlothian	17 August 1968
Heart of Midlothian	0–2	Airdrieonians	24 August 1968
Kilmarnock	2–2	Dundee	24 August 1968
Airdrieonians	2–0	Kilmarnock	28 August 1968
Dundee	4–0	Heart of Midlothian	28 August 1968
Airdrieonians	0–3	Dundee	31 August 1968
Heart of Midlothian	0–0	Kilmarnock	31 August 1968

=== Group 3 ===
Team	Pld	W	D	L	GF	GA	GR	Pts
Clyde	6	4	0	2	13	9	1.444	8
Dundee United	6	3	0	3	12	11	1.091	6
Aberdeen	6	3	0	3	8	9	0.889	6
Dunfermline Athletic	6	2	0	4	7	11	0.636	4

Home team	Score	Away team	Date
Clyde	4–1	Aberdeen	10 August 1968
Dunfermline Athletic	3–2	Dundee United	10 August 1968
Aberdeen	1–0	Dunfermline Athletic	14 August 1968
Dundee United	2–3	Clyde	14 August 1968
Aberdeen	4–1	Dundee United	17 August 1968
Dunfermline Athletic	2–1	Clyde	17 August 1968
Aberdeen	0–2	Clyde	24 August 1968
Dundee United	2–1	Dunfermline Athletic	24 August 1968
Clyde	0–4	Dundee United	28 August 1968
Dunfermline Athletic	1–2	Aberdeen	28 August 1968
Clyde	3–0	Dunfermline Athletic	31 August 1968
Dundee United	1–0	Aberdeen	31 August 1968

=== Group 4 ===
Team	Pld	W	D	L	GF	GA	GR	Pts
Celtic	6	6	0	0	20	2	10.000	12
Rangers	6	4	0	2	14	5	2.800	8
Partick Thistle	6	2	0	4	8	18	0.444	4
Morton	6	0	0	6	2	19	0.105	0

Home team	Score	Away team	Date
Morton	1–3	Partick Thistle	10 August 1968
Rangers	0–2	Celtic	10 August 1968
Celtic	4–1	Morton	14 August 1968
Partick Thistle	1–5	Rangers	14 August 1968
Celtic	4–0	Partick Thistle	17 August 1968
Rangers	2–0	Morton	17 August 1968
Celtic	1–0	Rangers	24 August 1968
Partick Thistle	2–0	Morton	24 August 1968
Morton	0–3	Celtic	28 August 1968
Rangers	2–1	Partick Thistle	28 August 1968
Morton	0–5	Rangers	31 August 1968
Partick Thistle	1–6	Celtic	31 August 1968

=== Group 5 ===
Team	Pld	W	D	L	GF	GA	GR	Pts
Ayr United	6	5	1	0	14	5	2.800	11
Stirling Albion	6	3	0	3	12	11	1.091	6
Arbroath	6	2	2	2	7	7	1.000	6
Cowdenbeath	6	0	1	5	6	16	0.375	1

Home team	Score	Away team	Date
Arbroath	2–1	Stirling Albion	10 August 1968
Ayr United	3–1	Cowdenbeath	10 August 1968
Cowdenbeath	1–1	Arbroath	14 August 1968
Stirling Albion	2–4	Ayr United	14 August 1968
Arbroath	1–1	Ayr United	17 August 1968
Stirling Albion	2–1	Cowdenbeath	17 August 1968
Cowdenbeath	0–2	Ayr United	24 August 1968
Stirling Albion	1–0	Arbroath	24 August 1968
Arbroath	2–0	Cowdenbeath	28 August 1968
Ayr United	1–0	Stirling Albion	28 August 1968
Ayr United	3–1	Arbroath	31 August 1968
Cowdenbeath	3–6	Stirling Albion	31 August 1968

=== Group 6 ===
Team	Pld	W	D	L	GF	GA	GR	Pts
East Fife	6	4	2	0	12	4	3.000	10
Queen of the South	6	1	4	1	7	6	1.167	6
Berwick Rangers	6	2	1	3	9	10	0.900	5
Clydebank	6	1	1	4	6	14	0.429	3

Home team	Score	Away team	Date
Berwick Rangers	1–1	Queen of the South	10 August 1968
East Fife	2–0	Clydebank	10 August 1968
Clydebank	2–4	Berwick Rangers	14 August 1968
Queen of the South	1–1	East Fife	14 August 1968
East Fife	1–0	Berwick Rangers	17 August 1968
Queen of the South	1–2	Clydebank	17 August 1968
Clydebank	1–3	East Fife	24 August 1968
Queen of the South	2–0	Berwick Rangers	24 August 1968
Berwick Rangers	3–0	Clydebank	28 August 1968
East Fife	1–1	Queen of the South	28 August 1968
Berwick Rangers	1–4	East Fife	31 August 1968
Clydebank	1–1	Queen of the South	31 August 1968

=== Group 7 ===
Team	Pld	W	D	L	GF	GA	GR	Pts
Hamilton Academical	6	4	1	1	8	5	1.600	9
St Mirren	6	4	0	2	9	9	1.000	8
Montrose	6	2	0	4	5	9	0.556	4
Motherwell	6	1	1	4	9	8	1.125	3

Home team	Score	Away team	Date
Hamilton Academical	2–1	Motherwell	10 August 1968
Montrose	1–2	St Mirren	10 August 1968
Motherwell	1–2	Montrose	14 August 1968
St Mirren	3–0	Hamilton Academical	14 August 1968
Montrose	0–2	Hamilton Academical	17 August 1968
Motherwell	6–0	St Mirren	17 August 1968
Motherwell	0–0	Hamilton Academical	24 August 1968
St Mirren	1–0	Montrose	24 August 1968
Hamilton Academical	2–1	St Mirren	28 August 1968
Montrose	2–1	Motherwell	28 August 1968
Hamilton Academical	2–0	Montrose	31 August 1968
St Mirren	2–0	Motherwell	31 August 1968

=== Group 8 ===
Team	Pld	W	D	L	GF	GA	GR	Pts
Albion Rovers	6	4	1	1	19	10	1.900	9
Queen's Park	6	3	0	3	14	10	1.400	6
Forfar Athletic	6	2	1	3	8	15	0.533	5
Dumbarton	6	2	0	4	9	15	0.600	4

Home team	Score	Away team	Date
Dumbarton	0–4	Albion Rovers	10 August 1968
Queen's Park	4–0	Forfar Athletic	10 August 1968
Albion Rovers	3–2	Queen's Park	14 August 1968
Forfar Athletic	1–0	Dumbarton	14 August 1968
Albion Rovers	2–4	Forfar Athletic	17 August 1968
Dumbarton	4–3	Queen's Park	17 August 1968
Albion Rovers	5–0	Dumbarton	24 August 1968
Forfar Athletic	0–2	Queen's Park	24 August 1968
Dumbarton	5–1	Forfar Athletic	28 August 1968
Queen's Park	2–3	Albion Rovers	28 August 1968
Forfar Athletic	2–2	Albion Rovers	31 August 1968
Queen's Park	1–0	Dumbarton	31 August 1968

=== Group 9 ===
Team	Pld	W	D	L	GF	GA	GR	Pts
Stranraer	4	3	0	1	7	4	1.750	6
Brechin City	4	2	0	2	7	5	1.400	4
Stenhousemuir	4	2	0	2	3	6	0.500	4
East Stirlingshire	4	1	1	2	6	7	0.857	3
Alloa Athletic	4	1	1	2	5	6	0.833	3

Home team	Score	Away team	Date
Alloa Athletic	0–1	Stenhousemuir	10 August 1968
Stranraer	2–1	East Stirlingshire	10 August 1968
Brechin City	2–3	Alloa Athletic	14 August 1968
Stenhousemuir	1–3	Stranraer	14 August 1968
East Stirlingshire	3–0	Stenhousemuir	17 August 1968
Stranraer	1–2	Brechin City	17 August 1968
East Stirlingshire	2–2	Alloa Athletic	24 August 1968
Stenhousemuir	1–0	Brechin City	24 August 1968
Alloa Athletic	0–1	Stranraer	31 August 1968
Brechin City	3–0	East Stirlingshire	31 August 1968

== Supplementary round ==
=== First leg ===
Home team	Score	Away team	Date
Stranraer	3–3	Albion Rovers	2 September 1968

=== Second leg ===
Home team	Score	Away team	Date	Agg
Albion Rovers	0–2	Stranraer	4 September 1968	3–5

== Quarter-finals ==
=== First leg ===
Home team	Score	Away team	Date
Ayr United	0–1	Clyde	11 September 1968
Celtic	10–0	Hamilton Academical	11 September 1968
East Fife	1–4	Hibernian	11 September 1968
Stranraer	0–4	Dundee	11 September 1968

=== Second leg ===
Home team	Score	Away team	Date	Agg
Clyde	2-0	Ayr United	25 September 1968	3-0
Dundee	6–0	Stranraer	25 September 1968	10–0
Hamilton Academical	2–4	Celtic	25 September 1968	2–14
Hibernian	2–1	East Fife	25 September 1968	6–2

== Semi-finals ==
=== Ties ===
Home team	Score	Away team	Date
Celtic	1–0	Clyde	9 October 1968
Hibernian	2–1	Dundee	9 October 1968

== Final ==
5 April 1969

Hibernian	2–6	Celtic
O'Rourke; Stevenson		Lennox; Auld; Craig; Wallace

Hampden Park, Glasgow
Attendance: 74,240
