= John Mailer (footballer) =

Scottish footballer

Personal information
- Full name: John Mailer
- Date of birth: 11 June 1961
- Place of birth: Bridge of Allan, Scotland
- Date of death: 2006 (aged 44–45)
- Position: Forward

Youth career
- Campsie Black Watch

Senior career*
Years	Team	Apps	(Gls)
1980–1982	Dumbarton	13	(0)
1981–1982	Stirling Albion	2	(0)
1986–1987	Hamilton Academical	19	(3)
1987–1989	Clyde	63	(17)
1989–1990	Cowdenbeath	16	(3)
1990–1991	Stirling Albion	9	(1)
- * Club domestic league appearances and goals

John Mailer (11 June 1961 – 2006) was a Scottish footballer who played for Dumbarton, Stirling Albion, Hamilton Academical, Clyde and Cowdenbeath. He was reportedly regarded as a "legendary teammate" by his teammates at Clyde.
