= 1981–82 Scottish First Division =

Scottish First Division
- Season: 1981–82
- Champions: Motherwell
- Promoted: Motherwell; Kilmarnock
- Relegated: East Stirlingshire; Queen of the South F.C.
- Top goalscorer: Blair Millar (20)

The 1981–82 Scottish First Division season was won by Motherwell by ten points over nearest rival Kilmarnock.

== League table ==
Pos	Team	Pld	W	D	L	GF	GA	GD	Pts	Promotion or relegation
1	Motherwell (C, P)	39	26	9	4	92	36	+56	61	Promotion to the Premier Division
2	Kilmarnock (P)	39	17	17	5	60	29	+31	51	Promotion to the Premier Division
3	Heart of Midlothian	39	21	8	10	65	37	+28	50	
4	Clydebank	39	19	8	12	61	53	+8	46	
5	St Johnstone	39	17	8	14	69	60	+9	42	
6	Ayr United	39	15	12	12	56	50	+6	42	
7	Hamilton Academical	39	16	8	15	52	49	+3	40	
8	Queen's Park	39	13	10	16	41	41	0	36	
9	Falkirk	39	11	14	14	49	52	−3	36	
10	Dunfermline Athletic	39	11	14	14	46	56	−10	36	
11	Dumbarton	39	13	9	17	49	61	−12	35	
12	Raith Rovers	39	11	7	21	31	59	−28	29	
13	East Stirlingshire (R)	39	7	10	22	38	77	−39	24	Relegation to the Second Division
14	Queen of the South (R)	39	4	10	25	44	93	−49	18	Relegation to the Second Division

Source: RSSSF
Rules for classification: 1) points; 2) goal difference; 3) number of goals scored.
(C) Champions; (P) Promoted; (R) Relegated

== Promotion ==
Motherwell and Kilmarnock finished 1st and second respectively and were promoted to the 1982–83 Scottish Premier Division.

== Relegation ==
East Stirlingshire and Queen of the South F.C. finished 13th and 14th respectively and were relegated to the 1982–83 Scottish Second Division.
