= 1968–69 Scottish Division One =

63rd season of top-tier football league in Scotland

Scottish Division One
- Season: 1968–69
- Champions: Celtic
- Relegated: Falkirk; Arbroath

The 1968–69 Scottish Division One was won by Celtic by five points over nearest rival Rangers. Falkirk and Arbroath finished 17th and 18th respectively and were relegated to the 1969-70 Second Division.

== League table ==
Pos	Team	Pld	W	D	L	GF	GA	GD	Pts
1	Celtic	34	23	8	3	89	32	+57	54
2	Rangers	34	21	7	6	81	32	+49	49
3	Dunfermline Athletic	34	19	7	8	63	45	+18	45
4	Kilmarnock	34	15	14	5	50	32	+18	44
5	Dundee United	34	17	9	8	61	49	+12	43
6	St Johnstone	34	16	5	13	66	59	+7	37
7	Airdrieonians	34	13	11	10	46	44	+2	37
8	Heart of Midlothian	34	14	8	12	52	54	−2	36
9	Dundee	34	10	12	12	47	48	−1	32
10	Morton	34	12	8	14	58	68	−10	32
11	St Mirren	34	11	10	13	40	54	−14	32
12	Hibernian	34	12	7	15	60	59	+1	31
13	Clyde	34	9	13	12	35	50	−15	31
14	Partick Thistle	34	9	10	15	39	53	−14	28
15	Aberdeen	34	9	8	17	50	59	−9	26
16	Raith Rovers	34	8	5	21	45	67	−22	21
17	Falkirk	34	5	8	21	33	69	−36	18
18	Arbroath	34	5	6	23	41	82	−41	16

Source: "1968-1969 First Division - SPFL Archive". SPFL.

== Results ==
Home \ Away	ABE	AIR	ARB	CEL	CLY	DND	DNU	DNF	FAL	HOM	HIB	KIL	MOR	PAR	RAI	RAN	STJ	STM
Aberdeen		3–1	2–2	1–3	0–1	0–0	0–1	2–2	2–0	1–2	2–6	0–1	6–3	1–1	2–1	0–0	2–0	2–0
Airdrieonians	2–0		2–0	0–0	1–0	0–3	1–0	2–2	1–1	2–1	3–1	0–2	2–2	2–1	2–0	3–2	3–0	1–1
Arbroath	2–1	0–2		0–5	1–1	1–2	3–1	0–1	3–1	2–3	3–4	1–2	3–1	2–2	0–1	1–5	1–2	1–1
Celtic	2–1	2–2	7–1		5–0	3–1	2–0	3–1	5–2	5–0	1–1	1–1	2–4	1–0	2–0	2–4	2–1	5–0
Clyde	1–1	1–0	3–1	0–3		0–0	2–2	3–0	2–0	0–1	1–1	2–1	0–0	1–2	3–2	1–1	0–3	0–0
Dundee	4–4	1–1	3–0	1–2	2–3		1–2	1–0	0–0	3–1	0–0	0–0	0–2	1–1	2–2	3–2	2–3	0–0
Dundee United	1–4	2–1	4–2	1–3	1–0	3–1		2–2	2–1	4–2	3–0	2–2	2–0	2–1	3–1	2–1	4–2	2–2
Dunfermline Athletic	5–1	1–0	2–0	1–1	2–1	2–0	2–2		2–0	4–2	1–1	1–1	5–3	2–0	3–2	0–3	3–1	6–2
Falkirk	1–0	2–1	2–2	0–0	3–3	0–1	2–2	0–1		1–3	0–1	1–1	4–1	2–2	1–3	0–3	2–1	0–2
Heart of Midlothian	3–2	1–1	2–2	0–1	2–3	2–2	1–0	3–1	2–1		0–0	0–1	2–2	2–0	1–0	1–1	2–2	2–1
Hibernian	1–1	5–1	1–2	2–5	2–1	1–3	1–1	3–1	3–2	1–3		1–0	5–0	1–2	3–0	1–2	4–0	3–0
Kilmarnock	2–1	2–1	1–0	2–2	0–0	1–0	3–0	0–1	5–1	1–0	2–1		1–0	1–1	4–4	3–3	2–0	0–0
Morton	1–0	1–1	5–1	1–1	1–1	2–1	1–2	0–2	2–0	0–2	4–3	3–2		3–3	3–2	0–2	4–4	3–0
Partick Thistle	1–0	1–1	2–1	0–4	4–0	0–4	0–0	0–1	1–2	5–1	2–1	0–2	2–1		2–1	0–2	1–1	0–2
Raith Rovers	3–2	1–2	3–1	1–3	1–1	4–0	1–2	0–3	3–1	0–3	2–0	0–0	0–1	3–0		0–3	1–5	0–2
Rangers	2–3	1–1	2–0	1–0	6–0	1–1	2–1	3–0	2–1	2–0	6–1	3–3	3–0	2–0	2–1		3–0	6–0
St Johnstone	3–1	3–1	5–1	2–3	0–0	3–1	1–4	2–1	4–0	2–1	2–1	1–0	2–3	2–2	3–0	2–0		2–3
St Mirren	1–2	1–2	2–1	0–3	1–0	2–3	1–1	1–2	3–0	1–1	3–0	1–1	2–1	1–0	2–2	1–0	1–2	

Legend: Blue = home team win; Yellow = draw; Red = away team win.

== Awards ==
Award	Winner	Club
SFWA Footballer of the Year	(Scotland) Bobby Murdoch	Celtic

== See also ==
- Nine in a row
