= 1954–55 Scottish Division A =

49th season of top-tier football league in Scotland

Scottish Division A
- Season: 1954–55
- Champions: Aberdeen

The 1954–55 Scottish Division A was won by Aberdeen by three points over nearest rival Celtic. No teams were relegated due to the league being expanded the following season.

== League table ==
Pos	Team	Pld	W	D	L	GF	GA	GD	Pts	Qualification
1	Aberdeen (C)	30	24	1	5	73	26	+47	49	
2	Celtic	30	19	8	3	76	37	+39	46	
3	Rangers	30	19	3	8	67	33	+34	41	
4	Hearts	30	16	7	7	74	45	+29	39	
5	Hibernian	30	15	4	11	64	54	+10	34	Invitation for the European Cup first round
6	St Mirren	30	12	8	10	55	54	+1	32	
7	Clyde	30	11	9	10	59	50	+9	31	
8	Dundee	30	13	4	13	48	48	0	30	
9	Partick Thistle	30	11	7	12	49	61	−12	29	
10	Kilmarnock	30	10	6	14	46	58	−12	26	
11	East Fife	30	9	6	15	51	62	−11	24	
12	Falkirk	30	8	8	14	42	54	−12	24	
13	Queen of the South	30	9	6	15	38	56	−18	24	
14	Raith Rovers	30	10	3	17	49	57	−8	23	
15	Motherwell	30	9	4	17	42	62	−20	22	
16	Stirling Albion	30	2	2	26	29	105	−76	6	

Source: RSSSF
(C) Champions

== Results ==
Home \ Away	ABE	CEL	CLY	DND	EFI	FAL	HOM	HIB	KIL	MOT	PAR	QOS	RAI	RAN	STM	STI
Aberdeen		0–2	3–0	1–0	4–1	1–0	1–0	3–1	4–1	4–1	4–0	2–0	3–2	4–0	2–1	5–0
Celtic	2–1		2–2	4–1	2–2	3–1	2–0	1–2	6–3	1–0	0–0	1–1	4–1	2–0	5–2	7–0
Clyde	0–1	2–2		2–0	3–0	2–0	0–3	6–3	1–1	2–2	2–2	2–2	3–0	1–1	2–2	5–1
Dundee	0–2	0–1	2–1		1–1	2–0	3–2	2–2	2–5	4–1	3–1	3–1	4–1	2–1	0–1	4–1
East Fife	1–1	3–4	0–3	4–1		2–0	0–2	1–5	1–5	4–2	0–2	0–1	3–1	2–7	6–1	5–0
Falkirk	1–2	1–1	2–1	2–2	2–2		2–2	3–1	5–3	1–1	3–1	1–1	2–1	0–3	0–1	3–1
Heart of Midlothian	2–0	0–3	3–0	2–1	1–3	5–3		5–1	2–2	3–2	5–4	3–1	2–0	3–4	1–1	3–0
Hibernian	0–1	0–5	2–3	3–1	0–0	0–1	2–3		3–2	4–1	3–1	1–1	2–1	2–1	2–1	4–1
Kilmarnock	0–4	1–2	2–1	0–2	0–0	2–0	1–3	0–3		1–2	1–2	4–1	2–2	1–0	1–1	2–1
Motherwell	1–3	2–2	2–0	0–2	3–5	0–3	1–1	1–5	0–1		1–2	2–1	3–2	2–0	2–3	3–1
Partick Thistle	1–0	4–2	2–3	2–1	1–0	2–2	4–4	0–3	0–3	0–1		1–0	1–1	2–5	1–1	3–3
Queen of the South	2–6	0–2	2–1	1–1	1–0	3–2	1–1	0–2	1–0	1–0	2–3		2–3	1–2	2–7	3–2
Raith Rovers	1–2	1–3	2–3	3–0	4–1	3–0	0–6	2–1	0–0	3–2	2–3	3–1		1–0	4–0	5–1
Rangers	3–1	4–1	1–0	3–0	2–0	4–1	2–1	1–1	6–0	2–0	3–1	1–0	1–0		1–1	6–1
St Mirren	0–4	1–1	4–4	0–2	3–0	1–0	1–1	4–2	2–0	0–1	3–2	3–2	0–2	2–1		7–1
Stirling Albion	3–4	2–3	1–4	0–2	0–4	1–1	0–5	2–4	1–2	1–3	0–1	0–3	2–1	0–2	2–1	

Legend: Blue = home team win; Yellow = draw; Red = away team win.
