= List of Dumbarton F.C. players =

Dumbarton F.C. are a Scottish professional association football club based in Dumbarton, who currently play in the Scottish League 1. They have played at their current home ground, the C&G Systems Stadium, since 2000. Previous to this they played at Boghead Park from 1879 until 2000 and various grounds in Dumbarton from their foundation in 1872 to 1879. They were one of the founding clubs of the Scottish Football League in 1890, and since that time the club's first team has competed in numerous nationally and internationally organised competitions.

All players who have played in 100 or more such matches or played international or representative football during their time at the club are listed below. Players are listed according to the date of their first professional contract signed with the club. Appearances and goals are for first-team competitive matches only, substitute appearances are included. Wartime appearances are listed separately as they are considered to be 'unofficial'.

== List of players ==
=== Club ===
Name	Nationality	Position	Dumbarton career	Appearances	Goals
Tom McMillan	Scotland	Half back	1885–1895	110	6
Alex Miller	Scotland	Full/half back	1888–1897	117	2
John McLeod	Scotland	Goalkeeper	1889–1895	108	3
John Brander	Scotland	Inside right	1905–1912	125	48
Bob Gordon	Scotland	Midfielder; Full back	1905–1911	122	11
Johnny Hill	Scotland	Outside left	1905–1912	139	80
James Ferguson	Scotland	Outside right	1906–1915	117	6
Finlay Speedie	Scotland	Half back	1909–1920	133	40
John Rowan	Scotland	Centre forward	1910–1920	145	76
John Miller	Scotland	Goalkeeper	1911–1921	228	0
James Riddell	Scotland	Half back	1913–1919	117	9
Alexander Thom	Scotland	Outside left	1913–1920	225	41
Bob McGrory	Scotland	Right back	1914–1920	217	0
Pat Travers	Scotland	Midfielder/Forward	1914–1921	111	10
William Ritchie	Scotland	Outside right	1915–1919	123	22
Thomas Raeside	Scotland	Half back	1916–1920	110	4
Bob McDermid	Scotland	Inside left	1918–1921	102	30
Harry Chatton	Republic of Ireland	Right half Right back	1920–1923; 1931–1933	141	5
Henry Loney	Scotland	Half back	1921–1924	113	7
Andrew Mair	Scotland	Left half	1921–1928	187	12
Philip Kennedy	Scotland	Inside forward	1922–1925	115	27
William Gibson	Scotland	Full back	1923–1929	117	0
James Warden	Scotland	Left back	1923–1927	101	3
John Russell	Scotland	Winger	1924–1928	105	29
Archibald McLardie	Scotland	Inside right Right half	1924–1930	149	22
John Harvie	Scotland	Centre half	1925–1929	129	16
James Miller	Scotland	Half back	1927–1931	112	4
Danny Muir	Scotland	Right back	1927–1931	133	0
Johnny Haddow	Scotland	Centre forward	1928–1936	181	112
Jim Kelso	Scotland	Left back	1929–1933	146	5
Willie Parlane	Scotland	Centre forward	1929–1937	145	68
Charles Ballantyne	Scotland	Centre half	1931–1935	117	13
John Casey	Scotland	Right back Right half	1935–1939	108	1
Bobby Donaldson	Scotland	Half back	1946–1950	160	0
Tom Donegan	Scotland	Half back	1946–1954	230	47
Hugh Goldie	Scotland	Centre forward	1947–1954	109	44
Jack McNee	Scotland	Left back	1947–1954	207	3
George Paton	Scotland	Goalkeeper	1948–1953	144	0
George Ferguson	Scotland	Half back	1948–1954	203	0
Jimmy Whyte	Scotland	Centre half	1950–1954	126	0
Hugh Shaw	Scotland	Right half	1951–1954	109	10
John McKay	Scotland	Right back	1954–1958	130	1
John McCall	Scotland	Wing half	1954–1959	162	8
Les Brown	Scotland	Winger	1954–1960	151	45
Tommy Craig	Scotland	Half back	1954–1960	163	4
Hugh Gallacher	Scotland	Centre forward	1954–1962	231	205
Benny Cairns	Scotland	Half back	1955–1958	103	9
Tom Whalen	Scotland	Inside forward	1955–1961	158	65
Tommy Govan	Scotland	Full back	1957–1967	309	7
Andy Jardine	Scotland	Full back	1957–1967	364	3
Charlie Stewart	Scotland	Winger	1957–1962	125	60
Freddie Glidden	Scotland	Centre half	1959–1962	122	0
Doug Robertson	Scotland	Goalkeeper	1959–1966	141	0
Hugh Harra	Scotland	Centre half	1962–1967	163	13
Andy Crawford	Scotland	Goalkeeper	1963–1968	123	0
Ronnie Curran	Scotland	Centre half	1963–1969	203	3
Bobby Johnstone	Scotland	Centre half	1964–1969	125	7
Drew Nelson	Scotland	Inside forward	1964–1967	111	38
Allan Watson	Scotland	Outside right	1966–1971	135	32
Roy McCormack	Scotland	Striker	1966–1976	307	132
Johnny Graham	Scotland	Left half	1967–1977	385	29
Billy Wilkinson	Scotland	Full back	1967–1974	120	0
George Muir	Scotland	Full back	1968–1972	143	2
Kenny Jenkins	Scotland	Midfielder	1969–1974	175	22
Allan McKay	Scotland	Full back	1969–1974	128	2
Laurie Williams	Scotland	Goalkeeper	1969–1980	372	0
Jackie Bolton	Scotland	Centre half	1970–1973	111	0
Kenny Wilson	Scotland	Striker	1970–1973	101	87
Peter Coleman	Scotland	Winger	1970–1976	199	20
Tom McAdam	Scotland	Winger	1970–1976	104	42
Willie Wallace	Scotland	Inside forward	1972–1975	105	25
John Cushley	Scotland	Centre half	1972–1976	111	0
John Bourke	Scotland	Inside forward	1972–1978; 1982–1986	267	95
Don Watt	Scotland	Full back	1973–1978	161	0
Jim Muir	Scotland	Centre half	1974–1978	146	27
Ally Brown	Scotland	Inside forward	1974–1983	298	35
Murdo MacLeod	Scotland	Inside forward Midfielder	1975–1979; 1993–1995	180	14
Graeme Sinclair	Scotland	Centre half	1975–1982	243	3
Donald McNeil	Scotland	Left half	1975–1991	320	18
Raymond Blair	Scotland	Outside right	1976–1983	220	51
Pat McCluskey	Scotland	Defender	1977–1980	125	13
Brian Gallacher	Scotland	Centre forward	1977–1981	158	46
Ally MacLeod	Scotland	Wing half	1977–1982	140	5
Joe Coyle	Scotland	Inside forward	1977–1985	230	41
John Gallacher	Scotland	Centre half	1978–1982	151	3
Tommy Coyle	Scotland	Wing half	1978–1987	318	24
Tom Carson	Scotland	Goalkeeper	1979–1984; 1991–1992	177	0
Martin McGowan	Scotland	Defender	1980–1986	147	3
Mark Clougherty	Scotland	Defender	1980–1988	244	1
Pat McGowan	Scotland	Inside forward	1980–1989	272	20
Albert Craig	Scotland	Midfielder	1981–1986	152	23
Ray Montgomerie	Scotland	Midfielder	1981–1988	197	8
Gordon Arthur	Scotland	Goalkeeper	1984–1988	157	0
Alan Kay	Scotland	Goalkeeper	1984–1988	103	4
Steve McCahill	Scotland	Centre half	1984–1989	164	5
Stuart MacIver	Scotland	Centre forward	1984–1992	189	69
Owen Coyle	Republic of Ireland	Striker	1985–1989	111	36
Gerry McCoy	Scotland	Striker	1985–1988	109	43
Stevie Gow	Scotland	Defender	1987–1999	288	4
John McQuade	Scotland	Centre forward	1988–1994	186	55
Jim Dempsey	Scotland	Centre half	1989–1993	110	2
John Boyd	Scotland	Full back	1989–1995	162	15
Charlie Gibson	Scotland	Centre forward	1989–1996	263	64
Jim Meechan	Scotland	Midfielder	1989–1998	291	32
Jim Marsland	Scotland	Midfielder	1990–1997	229	2
Paul Martin	Scotland	Midfielder	1990–1996	163	8
Martin McGarvey	Scotland	Midfielder	1990–1997	130	11
Martin Melvin	Scotland	Defender	1990–2002	272	5
Ian MacFarlane	Scotland	Goalkeeper	1991–1997	201	0
Martin Mooney	Scotland	Striker	1992–1999	252	55
Kenny Meechan	Scotland	Goalkeeper	1993–2000	112	0
Hugh Ward	Scotland	Forward	1993–2000	140	28
Colin McKinnon	Scotland	Midfielder	1994–1999	172	24
Toby King	Scotland	Forward	1994–2001	169	14
Lee Sharp	Scotland	Forward	1995–1999	111	16
Willie Wilson	Scotland	Midfielder	1996–2001	113	6
Jamie Bruce	Scotland	Defender	1996–2002	122	4
Alex Grace	Scotland	Midfielder	1997–2001	105	8
Stephen Jack	Scotland	Midfielder	1997–2002	152	1
Paddy Flannery	Scotland	Striker	1997–2004	199	87
Craig Brittain	Scotland	Defender	1997–2009	339	9
Joe Robertson	Scotland	Forward	1998–2003	158	26
Dave Stewart	Scotland	Defender	1998–2003	116	5
Andy Brown	Scotland	Forward	1999–2003	147	27
Michael Dickie	Scotland	Defender	1999–2003	122	0
Steven Bonar	Scotland	Midfielder	1999–2005	173	12
John Dillon	Scotland	Midfielder	1999–2007	267	32
Stephen Grindlay	Scotland	Goalkeeper	2001–2007; 2010–2015	295	0
Iain Russell	Scotland	Forward	2002–2006; 2018-date	132	37
Chris Boyle	Scotland	Midfielder	2003–2007	124	12
Ryan Borris	Scotland	Forward	2004–2007; 2011–2012	102	7
Andy Geggan	Scotland	Midfielder	2006–2011; 2021–2022	185	12
Ben Gordon	Scotland	Defender	2008–2011	114	7
Martin McNiff	Scotland	Midfielder	2008–2014; 2022–2023	137	6
Mark Gilhaney	Scotland	Midfielder	2010–2015	186	29
Bryan Prunty	Scotland	Forward	2011–2014	122	38
Scott Agnew	Scotland	Midfielder	2011–2015	151	35
Tony Wallace	Scotland	Midfielder	2011–2026	156	28
Andy Graham	Scotland	Defender	2012–2015	120	8
Garry Fleming	Scotland	Forward	2012–2017	179	30
Gregor Buchanan	Scotland	Defender	2015–2017; 2021–2023	160	13
Stuart Carswell	Scotland	Midfielder	2016–2023	224	16
Kyle Hutton	Scotland	Midfielder	2017–2020	116	0
David Wilson	Scotland	Midfielder	2017–2025	131	8
Kalvin Orsi	Scotland	Midfielder	2021–2025	158	7
Carlo Pignatiello	Scotland	Midfielder	2021–2025	125	13
Ryan Blair	Scotland	Midfielder	2022–2026	143	7
Finlay Gray	Scotland	Midfielder	2022–2025	128	16
Aron Lynas	Scotland	Defender	2022–2026	119	4
Mark Durnan	Scotland	Defender	2023–2026	104	9

=== Wartime ===
Name	Nationality	Position	Dumbarton career	Appearances	Goals
Jackie Milne	Scotland	Forward	1939–1945	164	35
Andy Cheyne	Scotland	Full back	1940–1945	112	3
Willie Reid	Scotland	Inside left	1941–1945	102	27
John Hepburn	Scotland	Outside right	1941–1946	113	20
Robert Wallace	Scotland	Right back	1943–1947	110	3

=== International ===
==== Senior ====
Name	Nation	International career	Appearances	Goals
Archie Lang	Scotland	1879–1880	1	0
Joe Lindsay	Scotland	1879–1886	8	6
Peter Miller	Scotland	1881–1883	3	0
James McAulay	Scotland	1881–1887	9	1
William McKinnon	Scotland	1882–1884	4	0
Michael Paton	Scotland	1882–1886	5	0
Robert 'Sparrow' Brown	Scotland	1883–1884	2	0
Robert 'Plumber' Brown	Scotland	1884–1885	1	0
Hugh Wilson	Scotland	1884–1885	1	0
Leitch Keir	Scotland	1885–1888	4	1
Ralph Aitken	Scotland	1885–1888	2	1
Tom McMillan	Scotland	1886–1887	1	0
William Robertson	Scotland	1886–1887	2	1
Duncan Stewart	Scotland	1887–1888	1	0
Geordie Dewar	Scotland	1887–1889	2	1
Jack Bell	Scotland	1889–1892	2	1
John McLeod	Scotland	1889–1893	4	0
John Taylor	Scotland	1891–1894	3	1
William Thomson	Scotland	1891–1898	4	1
Harry Chatton	Republic of Ireland	1931–1932	1	0
Dimitris Froxylias	Cyprus	2017–2018	1	0
Ali Omar	Somalia	2025–2026	2	0

==== League XI ====
Name	Nation	International career	Appearances	Goals
Jack Bell	(Scotland) Scottish League	1891–1892	1	1
Dickie Boyle	(Scotland) Scottish League	1891–1892	1	0
John Miller	(Scotland) Scottish League	1891–1892	1	2
John McLeod	(Scotland) Scottish League	1891–1893	2	0
John Taylor	(Scotland) Scottish League	1891–1894	4	2
Tom McMillan	(Scotland) Scottish League	1893–1894	1	0
William Thomson	(Scotland) Scottish League	1894–1895	1	0
Murdo MacLeod	(Scotland) Scottish League	1977–1978	1	0
Graeme Sinclair	(Scotland) Scottish League	1977–1980	2	0

==== Under-23 ====
Name	Nation	International career	Appearances	Goals
Graeme Sinclair	(Scotland) Scottish U23	1976–1977	1	0

==== Under-21 ====
Name	Nation	International career	Appearances	Goals
Murdo MacLeod	(Scotland) Scottish U21	1978–1979	2	1
Owen Coyle	(Republic of Ireland) Eire U21	1986–1987	2	1

==== Under-19 ====
Name	Nation	International career	Appearances	Goals
Ally MacLeod	(Scotland) Scottish U19	1977–1978	7	0

==== B League ====
Name	Nation	International career	Appearances	Goals
Duncan Smith	(Scotland) Scottish B League	1951–1952	1	1

==== Semi-Pro ====
Name	Nation	International career	Appearances	Goals
Graeme Sinclair	Scotland Semi Pro	1981–1982	3	0

==== Amateur ====
Name	Nation	International career	Appearances	Goals
Stewart Lennie	(Scotland) Scottish Amateurs	1930–1931	1	0
Willie Parlane	(Scotland) Scottish Amateurs	1930–1932	2	0
Alex Parlane	(Scotland) Scottish Amateurs	1931–1932	1	0
Johnny Parlane	(Scotland) Scottish Amateurs	1932–1933	1	0
Willie McCulloch	(Scotland) Scottish Amateurs	1959–1960	2	1
Jackie Neeson	(Scotland) Scottish Amateurs	1961–1962	2	0

==== Wartime ====
Name	National	International career	Appearances	Goals
Jackie Milne	Scotland XI	1940–1941	1	0

=== Representative ===
==== Scotch Counties ====
Name	Career	Appearances	Goals
Robert 'Sparrow' Brown	1880–1883	3	2
William McKinnon	1880–1883	4	0
Jock Hutcheson	1881–1883	3	0
Michael Paton	1884–1885	1	0
Peter Miller	1881–1883	4	0
Joe Lindsay	1880–1885	3	2
James McAulay	1881–1885	4	0
Robert 'Plumber' Brown	1884–1885	1	0
Geordie Dewar	1887–1888	1	0

==== Dunbartonshire ====
Name	Career	Appearances	Goals
Ralph Aitken	1883–1889	6	2
Robert 'Sparrow' Brown	1884–1885	3	1
William McKinnon	1884–1885	1	1
James Liddell	1884–1886	4	1
Robert 'Plumber' Brown	1884–1887	4	0
Jock Hutcheson	1884–1887	4	0
James McAulay	1884–1887	5	0
Peter Miller	1884–1887	6	0
Leitch Keir	1884–1890	7	0
Joe Lindsay	1884–1890	4	0
Hugh Wilson	1885–1886	1	0
Michael Paton	1885–1886	1	0
Tom McMillan	1885–1893	11	3
William Robertson	1886–1887	1	2
Geordie Dewar	1887–1889	3	0
Duncan Stewart	1887–1890	5	0
Jack Bell	1887–1892	7	3
James Bell	1888–1889	1	0
John Madden	1888–1889	3	4
Dickie Boyle	1889–1891	2	0
James Galbraith	1889–1891	2	0
John McLeod	1889–1892	4	0
Hugh Mair	1890–1891	1	0
Daniel Watson	1890–1891	1	0
James McNaught	1890–1893	2	0
Abe Hartley	1892–1893	1	0
John Taylor	1892–1893	1	0
William Thomson	1892–1898	2	0
John Fraser	1896–1897	1	0

==== West of Scotland ====
Name	Career	Appearances	Goals
Leitch Keir	1886–1887	1	0

==== Scottish Internationalists ====
Name	Career	Appearances	Goals
Geordie Dewar	1887–1888	2	0

==== Scottish Anglos ====
Name	Career	Appearances	Goals
Leitch Keir	1887–1888	1	0

==== SFA (Wartime) ====
Name	Career	Appearances	Goals
Jackie Milne	1940–1941	1	0
