= 1883 Scottish Cup final =

- Event: 1882–83 Scottish Cup
Dumbarton	Vale of Leven
2	2
- Date: 31 March 1883
- Venue: Hampden Park, Crosshill
- Referee: Thomas Lawrie
- Attendance: 15,000

Replay
Dumbarton	Vale of Leven
2	1
- Date: 7 April 1883
- Venue: Hampden Park, Crosshill
- Referee: Thomas Lawrie
- Attendance: 8,000

The 1883 Scottish Cup final was the 10th final of the Scottish Cup and the final of the 1882–83 Scottish Cup, the most prestigious knockout football competition in Scotland. The original match - which ended in a 2–2 draw - was played at Hampden Park in Crosshill (today part of Glasgow) on 31 March 1883 and was watched by a crowd of 15,000 spectators. For the first time in the competition's history, the final was contested by two teams from outside Glasgow - Dumbarton, who had never won the cup before, and three-time winners Vale of Leven.

The replay took place at the same venue on 7 April 1883 in front of 8,000 spectators. Dumbarton won the competition for the first - and so far only - time after they beat Vale of Leven 2–1.

This was the last Scottish Cup final to be held at the first Hampden Park before it was demolished by the Caledonian Railway to make way for the Cathcart District Railway.

== Background ==
Vale of Leven had reached the final on three previous occasions, winning the trophy for three consecutive seasons between 1877 and 1879. Only Queen's Park (six) had played in more finals than Vale of Leven before 1883.

Dumbarton became the third different team to reach the final on three consecutive occasions after Queen's Park and Vale of Leven. Both their previous appearances in the final had ended in defeat after a replay to Queen's Park in 1881 and 1882.

As the earlier rounds of the Scottish Cup were regionalised at the time, Dunbartonshire clubs Dumbarton and Vale of Leven had previously met five times in the competition. Vale of Leven had gone on to win the Scottish Cup after their first two meetings in 1877–78 and 1878–79 but Dumbarton had won each of the subsequent three ties.

== Route to the final ==
=== Dumbarton ===
Round	Opposition	Score
First round	Kilmaronock Thistle	w/o
Second round	King's Park	8–1
Third round	Jamestown	8–1
Fourth round	Thornliebank	3–0
Fifth round	bye	
Quarter-final	Queen's Park	3–1
Semi-final	Pollokshields Athletic	1–0 (match void)
Semi-final replay	Pollokshields Athletic	5–0

=== Vale of Leven ===
Round	Opposition	Score
First round	bye	
Second round	Milngavie	16–0
Third round	Heart of Midlothian	8–1
Fourth round	Edinburgh University	2–0
Fifth round	Lugar Boswell	1–1
Fifth round replay	Lugar Boswell	5–1
Quarter-final	Partick Thistle	4–0
Semi-final	Kilmarnock Athletic	1–1
Semi-final replay	Kilmarnock Athletic	2–0

Notes

1. A-Result declared void and a replay was ordered.

== Match details ==
=== Original ===
==== Report ====
Both clubs were short of their first choice XI for the final; left-wing forward McKinnon was missing for Dumbarton, which resulted in Dumbarton changing to a 2–3–5 formation, while Vale was without forwards Brown and Logan. Hampden had temporary stands for the expected big crowd, but the attendance of 15,000 was beyond expectation, and at one end of the ground, just as the game kicked off, a railing collapsed, throwing several fans onto the pitch.

A strong wind affected the game, making it less open than anticipated. Dumbarton kicked with the wind in the first half but tended to overshoot, not having gauged the full effect of the wind, although a long shot from Lindsay struck the post and went wide. The deadlock was broken on the half-hour, a free-kick for a McLeish handball 4 yards from the posts being knocked back to Paton, who chipped over McLintock's head. Dumbarton only held the lead for five minutes, failing to play to the referee's decision after claiming a foul, which allowed Johnstone to run through with little opposition and score with ease.

Dumbarton took the lead just before half-time, McArthur scoring in high off the right-hand post, but Vale, now playing with the wind, dominated the second, only the excellence of M'Aulay keeping the goal clear until the Vale "by a combined rush" equalized in the 70th minute, the goal being credited to Gillies, and although Vale pressed for the remainder of the game, the match ended 2–2. Friel was considered the best of the Vale forwards, while the Dumbarton weak link was James Miller, who "shows an unfortunate disposition to quarrel".

31 March 1883
15:00

Dumbarton	2–2	Vale of Leven
Paton 30'; McArthur 44'	Report	Johnstone 35'; Gillies 70'

Hampden Park, Crosshill
Attendance: 15,000
Referee: Thomas Lawrie

DUMBARTON:
GK	James McAulay
FB	Jock Hutcheson
FB	Michael Paton
HB	Peter Miller
HB	Willie Lang
HB	Leitch Keir
FW	Robert S. Brown
FW	Robert P. Brown
FW	George McArthur
FW	Joseph Lindsay
FW	James Miller
For the replay, R. Anderson replaced Lang.

VALE OF LEVEN:
GK	Alex McLintock
FB	Andrew McIntyre
FB	John Forbes
HB	John McPherson
HB	H. McLeish
FW	J. McFarlane
FW	D. Kennedy
FW	M. Gillies
FW	Robert McCrae
FW	W. H. Johnstone
FW	Dan Friel
Team was unchanged for the replay.

=== Replay ===
==== Report ====
McKinnon was expected to have recovered enough from injury to take his place in the forward line, but in the end had not recovered enough, and Dumbarton shuffled tactics, bringing in Anderson from the reserves to revert to 2–2–6, Lang being the unlucky man to lose his half-back place.

With a slight wind behind them in the first half, the Vale used the accurate long passing of Forbes to keep pressure on Dumbarton, but the first half had few chances, most of the threats to goal coming from scrimmages; the closest however anyone came to scoring was a McPherson shot that went so close to the post that many spectators thought it had gone the right side, but the umpires turned down an appeal for a goal.

Almost straight from the kick-off though Dumbarton took the lead; Anderson justified his inclusion by mugging a tardy McPherson, and, after an exchange of passes with R. P. Brown, the latter finished off with a shot in off the post. Dumbarton kept the pressure on with a series of corners, and Johnstone nearly equalized when McCrae led a break and centred to Johnstone, who sent the ball just wide. Shortly after that chance Dumbarton doubled the lead, R.S. Brown putting in a long and speculative shot, which McLintock tried to kick out without handling, but missed the ball entirely.

Rattled, the Vale lost its composure in front of goal, poor passing amongst the forwards preventing it from taking any advantage, until with five minutes remaining Friel scored with a shot that went in off the bar. Johnstone brought out an excellent save from McAulay soon afterwards, but Dumbarton held possession for the final couple of minutes, and were chaired off the field at the call of time.

7 April 1883
15:00

Dumbarton	2–1	Vale of Leven
R. P. Brown 47'; R. S. Brown 50'	Report	Friel 85'

Hampden Park
Attendance: 15,000
Referee: Thomas Lawrie

=== The trip to Luss ===
One unfortunate aftermath was that the Dumbarton players went on a celebratory excursion to Luss on the following Monday, which saw their vehicles pass through the Vale's home village of Alexandria, the wagons decorated with flags and colours, and accompanied by the sound of trumpets; forewarned of their return, some of the Alexandria locals attacked the vehicles, ripping up the flags and throwing two pails of animal blood taken from Mr Johnstone's butchery at the occupants. What could have been a more dangerous scene was relieved by the arrival of the Vale players, who acted as protection.
