= 1883–84 Dumbarton F.C. season =

Dumbarton
1883–84 season
- Stadium: Boghead Park, Dumbarton
- Scottish Cup: First Round
Home colours

The 1883–84 season was the 11th Scottish football season in which Dumbarton competed at a national level.

== Scottish Cup ==
After the success of the previous season, Dumbarton fell at the 'first hurdle' in the Scottish Cup by losing to local rivals Renton.

8 September 1883 Cup R1	Renton	2–1	Dumbarton	Tontine Park
	McIntyre 18'; 70'		Keir 20'	Attendance: 3,000

== Glasgow Charity Cup ==
Dumbarton's fortunes were no better in the Glasgow Charity Cup where they lost at the semi-final stage to 3rd LRV. A protest was lodged by Dumbarton after the game that their opponents had played several players from other teams - against SFA rules. However the basis of the objection was doomed to failure, due in part to the fact that the game had been refereed by the president of the SFA, and if the protest had been successful, Queen's Park's victory over Rangers would have had to be replayed, as the QP team was similarly sprinkled with 'guest' players - indeed it seemed that very few decisions went against Queens Park in those days!

19 April 1884 Semifinal	Dumbarton	0–1	3rd LRV	Hampden Park
			Crawford 1'	Attendance: 7,000

== Friendlies/other matches ==
Notwithstanding the early cup exit, Dumbarton's fixture card was a busy one.

The season began with a charity match against Rangers in aid of the Daphne Disaster Fund. This was followed in Scotland with home and away fixtures against Queen's Park, Vale of Leven, Rangers, St Mirren (the Renfrewshire Cup holders) and St Bernards - all 10 of which were won, in addition to a 7-0 thumping of Ayrshire Cup holders Kilmarnock Athletic.

There were also 12 'friendly' matches played against English opposition, including home and away fixtures against Aston Villa, Walsall Swifts, Nottingham Forest, Blackburn Rovers and Blackburn Olympic, the 1882-83 FA Cup winners. The 6–1 win at Boghead against 'Olympic' was at the time recognised as the unofficial Championship of Great Britain.

In all, 23 matches were won, 1 drawn and 7 lost, scoring 95 goals and conceding 38.

31 July 1883 Benefit	Rangers	4–2	Dumbarton	Kinning Park
	scrimmage Christie; McHardy scrimmage		Brown (P); Brown (S)	Attendance: 2,500; Referee: J Holm

4 August 1883 Friendly	Vale of Leven	1–2	Dumbarton	Alexandria
	Goal		Brown (P); Lindsay

25 August 1883 Friendly	Hearts	3–3	Dumbarton	Tynecastle Stadium
	Waugh; Wood; Douglas		Brown (P); Lindsay; Anderson

1 September 1883 Friendly	Dumbarton	6–1	(England) Blackburn Olympic	Boghead Park
	McArthur; Brown (P); Brown (S); Miller, J		Goal	Attendance: 3,000

17 September 1883 Friendly	(England) Walsall Swifts	0–2	Dumbarton	The Chuckery
			Kennedy 44'; Miller, P 70'	Attendance: 3,500; Referee: J Orr

22 September 1883 Friendly	Dumbarton	3–2	Queen's Park	Boghead Park
	Miller 20', 46'; McKinnon 45'		Miller 15'	Referee: W Young

29 September 1883 Friendly	Dumbarton	2–1	(England) Blackburn Rovers	Boghead Park
	McKinnon 75'; Brown 85'		Brown 20'	Attendance: 3,000; Referee: T Lawrie

6 October 1883 Friendly	Dumbarton	3–0	Vale of Leven	Boghead Park
	Lindsay; Brown (S)			Attendance: 3,000; Referee: W Young

13 October 1883 Friendly	3rd LRV	4–0	Dumbarton	Cathkin Park
	Goal			Attendance: 1,200

27 October 1883 Friendly	Dumbarton	2–0	Rangers	Boghead Park
	Lindsay 83'; McKinnon 87'			Attendance: 5,000; Referee: W Young

3 November 1883 Friendly	Queen's Park	1–3	Dumbarton	Titwood Park, Strathbungo
	Christie 38'		McKinnon; Colville; Brown	Attendance: 6,000; Referee: J Johnstone

10 November 1883 Friendly	Dumbarton	4–2	St Mirren	Boghead Park
	Brown (S); Brown (P); McKinnon		Goal	Referee: W McIntosh

17 November 1883 Friendly	Rangers	2–4	Dumbarton	Kinning Park
	McHardy; McGregor		McKinnon; Brown; Colville	Attendance: 5,000

24 November 1883 Friendly	(England) Notts Forest	2–3	Dumbarton	Park Side, Nottingham
	Widowsen		Keir; Hutton; Colville	Attendance: 4,000; Referee: J Pigot

1 December 1883 Friendly	Northern	1–5	Dumbarton	Hyde Park (Glasgow)
	Goal		Lindsay; Brown (S); Colville

8 December 1883 Friendly	Dumbarton	7–0	Kilmarnock Athletic	Boghead Park
	McKinnon; Kennedy

15 December 1883 Friendly	Dumbarton	4–0	(England) Walsall Swifts	Boghead Park
	Brown; McKinnon; Higgins (o.g.)			Referee: Mr McDowall

22 December 1883 Friendly	Dumbarton	2–1	Cowlairs	Boghead Park
	Goal		Goal

29 December 1883 Friendly	(England) Old Carthusian	1–2	Dumbarton	Kennington Oval
	Wilson		McKinnon; Brown	Attendance: 1,000; Referee: C Alcock

31 December 1883 Friendly	(England) Aston Villa	1–0	Dumbarton	Wellington Road (Perry Barr)
	Whateley			Attendance: 8,000; Referee: J Cofield

1 January 1884 Friendly	(England) Blackburn Rovers	2–1	Dumbarton	Leamington Road
	Douglas 15', 85'		Brown	Attendance: 10,000; Referee: S Ormerod

2 January 1884 Friendly	(England) Accrington	0–4	Dumbarton	Thorneyholme Road
			Brown (S) 35'	Attendance: 3,000; Referee: Mr Lewis

12 January 1884 Friendly	Dumbarton	1–2	Thornliebank	Boghead Park
	Lindsay		Law; Bonar	Attendance: 2,000

26 January 1884 Friendly	St Bernard's	0–1	Dumbarton	Powderhall
			Goal

12 February 1884 Friendly	Dumbarton	3–1	(England) Notts Forest	Boghead Park
	Colville 15'; Lindsay 40', 55'		Miller, P 50' (o.g.)	Attendance: 2,000; Referee: W Young

9 February 1884 Friendly	St Mirren	0–6	Dumbarton	Westmarch, Paisley
			Goal	Attendance: 6,000

16 February 1884 Friendly	Dumbarton	8–0	St Bernard's	Boghead Park
	McKinnon; Lindsay; Brown (P); Brown (S); McAulay

23 February 1884 Friendly	(England) Blackburn Olympic	4–3	Dumbarton	Hole-i'-th'-Wall, Blackburn
	Dewhurst; Parker; Matthews		Miller	Attendance: 4,000; Referee: Mr Critchley

15 March 1884 Friendly	Dumbarton	3–0	Thistle	Boghead Park
	Goal

22 March 1884 Friendly	Partick Thistle	2–1	Dumbarton	Inchview, Glasgow
	Paterson; Robertson		Lindsay 7'	Attendance: 4,000

12 April 1884 Friendly	Dumbarton	5–0	(England) Aston Villa	Boghead Park
	McKinnon; Lindsay; Miller (o.g.)			Attendance: 5,000; Referee: Mr Carmichael

== Player statistics ==
Of note amongst those donning the club's colours for the first time was Robert 'Plumber' Brown.

Only includes appearances and goals in competitive Scottish Cup matches.

Player	Position	Appearances	Goals
(Scotland) James McAulay	GK	1	0
(Scotland) Jock Hutcheson	DF	1	0
(Scotland) Willie Lang	DF	1	0
(Scotland) Leitch Keir	MF	1	1
(Scotland) Peter Miller	MF	1	0
(Scotland) R Anderson	FW	1	0
(Scotland) Robert 'Plumber' Brown	FW	1	0
(Scotland) Robert 'Sparrow' Brown	FW	1	0
(Scotland) James Liddell	FW	1	0
(Scotland) Joe Lindsay	FW	1	0
(Scotland) James Miller	FW	1	0

=== International caps ===
An international trial match was played on 8 March 1884 to consider selection of teams to represent Scotland against Ireland, England and Wales in the inaugural British Home Championship. Joe Lindsay, James McAulay, William McKinnon and Peter Miller were all selected to play for the 'Probables' against an 'Improbable' XI which included 'Sparrow' Brown and Jock Hutcheson. The game ended in a 2–2 draw with McKinnon scoring one of the 'Probables' goals.

Subsequently, the following Dumbarton players were selected:

- Robert 'Sparrow' Brown earned his first and second caps against Ireland and Wales respectively.

- Joe Lindsay earned his fourth and fifth caps against England and Wales respectively, scoring a goal in the 4–1 win over the Welsh.

- William McKinnon earned his third and fourth caps against England and Wales respectively.

- James McAulay earned his fourth cap against England and Michael Paton earned his second cap against Wales.

== Reserve team ==
Dumbarton reached the final of the Scottish Second XI Cup for the second time in three seasons before losing out to the holders, Kilmarnock Athletic.

On the same day as the international trial, a Dumbartonshire XI played against a Glasgow XI to raise funds for the Second Eleven Association. Ralph Aitken, James Liddell, James Miller and W Watt played, with Miller scoring twice and Watt once in the 4–1 win.
