= 1885–86 Dumbarton F.C. season =

Dumbarton
1885–86 season
- Stadium: Boghead Park, Dumbarton
- Scottish Cup: Fifth round
Home colours

The 1885–86 season was the 13th Scottish football season in which Dumbarton competed at a national level.

== Scottish Cup ==
Dumbarton had an easy passage through the early rounds of the Scottish Cup before losing out to Hibernian, the East of Scotland Shield holders, in the fifth round after a 2–2 draw.

19 September 1885 Cup round 1	Dumbarton	3–1	Vale of Leven Wanderers	Boghead Park
	Hartley; Wilson; Lindsay		Goal

3 October 1885 Cup round 2	Dumbarton	7–0	Union (Dumbarton)	Boghead Park
	Aitken Tait

24 October 1885 Cup round 3	Dumbarton	3–0	Thistle	Boghead Park
	Tait 10'; Brown, R 86'; Liddell 88'

14 November 1885 Cup round 4	Dumbarton	3–0	Partick Thistle	Boghead Park
	Aitken 62', 70'; Lindsay 85'

5 December 1885 Cup round 5	Dumbarton	2–2	Hibernian	Boghead Park
	Tobin (o.g.); Brown 44'		Wilson 10' (o.g.); 85'	Attendance: 2,000

12 December 1885 Cup round 5R	Hibernian	4–3	Dumbarton	Easter Road
	McGhee 85'; Preston; Clark		Hartley 5'; Brown 40'	Attendance: 6,000; Referee: Mr Kennedy

== Dumbartonshire Cup ==
Dumbarton failed to hold on to the Dumbartonshire Cup and were defeated at the semi-final stage by Dumbarton Athletic.

10 October 1885 Round 1	Dumbarton	7–0	Bonhill	Boghead Park
	Aitken; Brown; Tait Liddell; McMillan

28 November 1885 Round 2	Renton	1–0; VOID	Dumbarton	Tontine Park
	65'			Attendance: 4,000

26 December 1885 Round 2	Dumbarton	2–0	Renton	Boghead Park
	scrimmage 40'; McKinnon 85'			Attendance: 4,500

13 February 1886 Semi-final	Dumbarton Athletic	2–1	Dumbarton	Burnside Park
	40'		Liddell 75'

== Glasgow Charity Cup ==
It was at the semi-final stage of the Glasgow Charity Cup that Dumbarton also tasted defeat, this time to rivals Vale of Leven.

8 May 1886 Semi-final	Vale of Leven	1–0	Dumbarton	Cathkin Park
	Coleman 75'			Attendance: 6,000

== Dumbartonshire Association Tournament ==
At the start of the season a tournament was played across the county in order to raise funds for the Dumbartonshire association. There were 8 invitees with the first rounds being played in two groups at Alexandria on 4 August and at Helensburgh a week later, where Dumbarton were due to have met Yoker, but their opponents having failed to turn up, the Dumbarton players entertained the crowd by playing a six-a-side match. The semi finals were played at Boghead where Dumbarton drew with Vale of Leven - the replay took place five days later. In the final against Dumbarton Athletic on 27 August Dumbarton won 2–0.

11 August 1885 Round 1	Dumbarton	WO	Yoker	Helensburgh

20 August 1885 Semi-final	Dumbarton	0–0	Vale of Leven	Boghead Park
				Attendance: 500

25 August 1885 Semi-final Replay	Vale of Leven	0–1	Dumbarton	Alexandria, West Dunbartonshire
			Goal	Attendance: 1,500; Referee: W Young

27 August 1885 Final	Dumbarton	2–0	Dumbarton Athletic	Boghead Park
	Goal

== Friendlies ==
Despite the growing competitive calendar, 22 'friendly' matches were played, including home and away fixtures against Rangers, Queens Park, Vale of Leven and Vale of Leven Wanderers, together with matches against Glasgow Cup holders Cambuslang, and Forfarshire Cup holders, Dundee Harp. In addition a four match tour of the north of Scotland was undertaken during the New Year holidays. In all, 14 were won, 5 drawn and 3 lost, scoring 72 goals and conceding 42.

22 August 1885 Friendly	Morton	3–4	Dumbarton	Cappielow Park
	Lindsay; Barrie; Nugent 55'		18'; Miller; 65'; 89'	Referee: Mr Gordon

29 August 1885 Friendly	Dumbarton	4–1	Rangers	Boghead Park
	Lindsay 20'; Hartley scrimmage 60'		Goal

2 September 1885 Friendly	Dumbarton	5–0	Vale of Leven Wanderers	Boghead Park
	Goal

5 September 1885 Friendly	Hearts	1–2	Dumbarton	Tynecastle Stadium
	Edmonstone		Keir 10'; Gourlay	Attendance: 2,000; Referee: L Watt

26 September 1885 Friendly	Partick Thistle	2–2	Dumbarton	Whiteinch
	Robertson		Goal	Attendance: 4,000

17 October 1885 Friendly	Dumbarton	2–3	Queen's Park	Boghead Park
	Tait 85'		McWhannel 2', 65'; Hamilton	Attendance: 5,000

31 October 1885 Friendly	Dumbarton	2–2	Vale of Leven	Boghead Park
	Lindsay 5'		Goal	Attendance: 3,500

7 November 1885 Friendly	Dumbarton	4–2	Renton	Boghead Park
	Brown; Aitken; Tait; Lindsay		McColl; 80'	Attendance: 4,000

21 November 1885 Friendly	Rangers	2–5	Dumbarton	Kinning Park
	McKenzie 25'; Heggie		Aitken 26', 28'; 40'; 46'	Attendance: 2,000

19 December 1885 Friendly	Queen's Park	2–2	Dumbarton	Hampden Park
	Somerville 33'		Liddell; Gillespie (o.g.)	Attendance: 5,000

1 January 1886 Friendly	Dundee Harp	1–3	Dumbarton	Harp Athletic Grounds, Dundee
	Lees 1'		Lindsay 20'; Aitken 38'; McKinnon 46'	Attendance: 6,000

2 January 1886 Friendly	Our Boys Dundee	2–4	Dumbarton	West Craigie Park, Dundee
	Crichton 20'; Sandy 44'		McMillan 25'; McKinnon; Aitken	Attendance: 2,000

4 January 1886 Friendly	Arbroath	2–2	Dumbarton	Gayfield Park
	Munro		(o.g.); Aitken	Attendance: 3,000

5 January 1886 Friendly	Aberdeen	0–7	Dumbarton	Recreation Grounds, Aberdeen
			McAulay 5'; Wood 44' (o.g.) 60'	Referee: A Tullis

20 February 1886 Friendly	St Mirren	0–4	Dumbarton	Westmarch (stadium)
			Aitken 60'

27 February 1886 Friendly	Hibernian	3–1	Dumbarton	Easter Road
	Smith 20'		Aitken 15'	Attendance: 2,000

6 March 1886 Friendly	3rd LRV	1–2	Dumbarton	Cathkin Park
	Thomson 2'		Brown; McMillan	Attendance: 2,000

20 March 1886 Friendly	Vale of Leven	3–0	Dumbarton	Alexandria
	McColl; Coleman; Gillies			Attendance: 2,000

17 April 1886 Friendly	Dumbarton	3–3	Cambuslang	Boghead Park
	Brown; Hartley		scrimmage Low scrimmage	Attendance: 1,500

22 April 1886 Friendly	Vale of Leven Wanderers	2–5	Dumbarton	Alexandria
	Goal		Goal	Attendance: 2,500

24 April 1886 Friendly	Our Boys Dundee	4–5	Dumbarton	West Craigie Park, Dundee
	Gloag 3'; Ramsay 35'; Mathieson; Sandy		McKinnon 15'; Hartley; Lindsay

1 May 1886 Friendly	Cambuslang	3–4	Dumbarton	Whitefield Park, Cambuslang
	33'		McKinnon 60'; Paton; Lindsay; Brown 67'

== Player statistics ==
Of note amongst those donning the club's colours for the first time was Tom McMillan.
At the same time two internationalists were lost from the club's squad:
- Robert 'Sparrow' Brown's club career spanned seven seasons, and in addition to his international caps was a member of the Scottish Cup winning side of 1882–82.
- Jock Hutcheson travelled south to join Bolton Wanderers. He served the club for over a decade, and was also a member of the cup winning squad. He was perhaps unlucky not to earn a Scottish cap, having played in 4 international trials without success.

Only includes appearances and goals in competitive Scottish Cup matches.

Player	Position	Appearances	Goals
(Scotland) James McAulay	GK	6	0
(Scotland) Tom McMillan	DF	6	0
(Scotland) Michael Paton	DF	2	0
(Scotland) Hugh Wilson	DF	6	1
(Scotland) Leitch Keir	MF	5	0
(Scotland) Peter Miller	MF	6	0
(Scotland) Ralph Aitken	FW	5	2
(Scotland) Robert 'Plumber' Brown	FW	6	3
(Scotland) J Gourlay	FW	1	0
(Scotland) David Hartley	FW	5	3
(Scotland) James Liddell	FW	5	1
(Scotland) Joe Lindsay	FW	5	2
(Scotland) William McKinnon	FW	2	0
(Scotland) J McMillan	FW	1	0
(Scotland) Pete Tait	FW	5	1

=== International caps ===
An international trial match was played on 13 March 1886 to consider selection of teams to represent Scotland in the upcoming games in the 1886 British Home Championship. James McAulay played for the 'Probables' and Ralph Aitken and Joe Lindsay for the 'Improbables'. The latter won by 6–3 with Lindsay scoring a hat-trick and Aitken getting another.

Subsequently, five Dumbarton players were selected to play, as follows:

- Ralph Aitken, Michael Paton, James McAulay and Joe Lindsay earned their first, fifth, seventh and eighth caps respectively against England.

- Leitch Keir earned his second cap against Ireland.

=== Representative matches ===
Four representative matches were played during the season by the Dumbartonshire Football Association, and Dumbarton players were selected to play as follows:

Date	Opponent	Result	Players (Goals)
5 September 1885	Forfarshire	2-2	Hutcheson; Liddell; Wilson
30 January 1886	Edinburgh	1-1	Aitken; Brown; Keir; Lindsay; McAulay; McMillan; Miller
13 March 1886	Renfrewshire	2-3	Liddell
10 April 1886	Renfrewshire	2-3	Aitken; Brown; Keir; McAulay; McMillan, T; Miller, P; Paton; Tate

In addition, the Scotland XI who played against Ireland (including Leitch Keir) subsequently played a friendly against Dundee Harp on 8 April 1886 - and lost 1–3.
