= 1882–83 Dumbarton F.C. season =

Dumbarton
1882–83 season
- Stadium: Boghead Park, Dumbarton
- Scottish Cup: Winners
Home colours

The 1882–83 season was the tenth Scottish football season in which Dumbarton competed at a national level.

== Scottish Cup ==
Following two seasons as runners-up, it was 'third time lucky' for Dumbarton in the Scottish Cup where they were at last crowned Scottish champions. On the road to the final Dumbarton disposed of the holders, Queen's Park in the quarter-final and after a 2–2 draw, defeated their old rivals Vale of Leven in the final.

Cup R1	Dumbarton	walkover	Kilmarnock Thistle	Boghead Park

30 September 1882 Cup R2	Dumbarton	8–1	King's Park	Boghead Park
	Goal		Goal

21 October 1882 Cup R3	Dumbarton	8–1	Jamestown	Boghead Park
	Lindsay; Anderson; Brown (S); Miller, J		Goal

11 November 1882 Cup R4	Thornliebank	0–3	Dumbarton	Thornliebank
			Lindsay	Attendance: 2,000

3 February 1883 Cup R6	Dumbarton	3–1	Queen's Park	Boghead Park
	Brown (P) 30'; McKinnon 35', 46'		Kay 11'	Attendance: 10,000; Referee: S Broadfoot

24 February 1883 Cup SF	Dumbarton	1–0; VOID	Pollokshields Athletic	Hampden Park
	scrimmage			Attendance: 7,000

17 March 1883 Cup SF	Dumbarton	5–0	Pollokshields Athletic	Boghead Park
	McKinnon; McArthur; Paton			Attendance: 3,000

31 March 1883 Cup Final	Dumbarton	2–2	Vale of Leven	Hampden Park
	Paton 33'; McArthur 45'		Johnston 35'; McRae 75'	Attendance: 15,000; Referee: T Lawrie

7 April 1883 Cup Final	Dumbarton	2–1	Vale of Leven	Hampden Park
	Brown (P) 47'; Brown (S) 52'		Friel 85'	Attendance: 15,000; Referee: T Lawrie

== Glasgow Charity Cup ==
Queen's Park got some revenge for their Scottish Cup exit by beating Dumbarton in the semi-final.

28 April 1883 Semifinal	Queen's Park	2–1	Dumbarton	Hampden Park
	Gray; Allan 85'		Weir	Attendance: 5,000; Referee: Mr Broadfoot

== Friendlies ==
During the season, 19 'friendly' matches were played, including home and away fixtures against Vale of Leven, Hearts, Rangers, St Bernards and Cowlairs, home and away wins over Ayrshire Cup holders Kilmarnock Portland, and a north of England 'tour' which took in three matches during the New Year holidays. In all, 14 were won, 2 drawn and 3 lost, scoring 57 goals and conceding 19.

2 September 1882 Friendly	Dumbarton	4–1	Hearts	Boghead Park
	Goal		Goal

16 September 1882 Friendly	Rangers	1–1	Dumbarton	Kinning Park
	Corbett 43'		scrimmage	Attendance: 3,000; Referee: G Goudie

23 September 1882 Friendly	Dumbarton	4–0	3rd LRV	Boghead Park
	scrimmage 30'; Hutton; Miller 75'; Brown (S) 90'

7 October 1882 Friendly	St Mirren	1–4	Dumbarton	Greenhill, Paisley
	scrimmage		20'

14 October 1882 Friendly	Dumbarton	3–1	Portland (Kilmarnock)	Boghead Park
	McArthur		Goal

28 October 1882 Friendly	Vale of Leven	1–0	Dumbarton	Alexandria
	Kennedy			Attendance: 4,000

18 November 1882 Friendly	Dumbarton	3–1	Northern	Boghead Park
	Goal		Goal

25 November 1882 Friendly	Dumbarton	4–0	St Bernard's	Boghead Park
	Goal

9 December 1882 Friendly	Portland (Kilmarnock)	1–4	Dumbarton	Hamilton Park, Kilmarnock
	Goal		Goal

23 December 1882 Friendly	Dumbarton	3–1	Rangers	Boghead Park
	MacNab		Gossland	Attendance: 2,000; Referee: A Bryce

30 December 1882 Friendly	(England) Blackburn Rovers	1–3	Dumbarton	Leamington Road
	Duckworth		Lindsay 14'; Brown; McKinnon	Attendance: 2,000

1 January 1883 Friendly	(England) Bolton Wanderers	0–2	Dumbarton	Pike's Lane
			Weir; Lindsay	Attendance: 5,000

2 January 1883 Friendly	(England) Halliwell	1–10	Dumbarton	Bennett's, Halliwell
	Atherton 2'		McKinnon 1'; Brown; Entwhistle (o.g.); Lindsay	Attendance: 5,000; Referee: S Wood

6 January 1883 Friendly	Dumbarton	2–1	Cowlairs	Boghead Park
	Goal		Goal	Attendance: 2,000

13 January 1883 Friendly	St Bernard's	5–2	Dumbarton	Powderhall
	Lang (o.g.); Charlton; McNaughton; McBeth		Weir; McBeth

20 January 1883 Friendly	Dumbarton	4–1	Vale of Leven	Boghead Park
	Weir 5'		Friel

10 February 1883 Friendly	Partick	0–2	Dumbarton	Inchview, Partick
			McArthur 44'; Kerr 75'

3 March 1883 Friendly	Hearts	0–0	Dumbarton	Tynecastle Stadium

10 March 1883 Friendly	Cowlairs	3–2	Dumbarton	Gourlay Park, Cowlairs
	Weir; Bishop		Lindsay

== Player statistics ==
Of note amongst those donning the club's colours for the first time was Robert 'Plumber' Brown.

Only includes appearances and goals in competitive Scottish Cup matches.

Player	Position	Appearances	Goals
(Scotland) James McAulay	GK	7	0
(Scotland) Jock Hutcheson	DF	6	0
(Scotland) Michael Paton	DF	4	2
(Scotland) Tom Veitch	DF	2	0
(Scotland) Leitch Keir	MF	6	0
(Scotland) Willie Lang	MF	4	0
(Scotland) Peter Miller	MF	7	0
(Scotland) R Anderson	FW	3	3
(Scotland) Robert 'Plumber' Brown	FW	7	2
(Scotland) Robert 'Sparrow' Brown	FW	7	2
(Scotland) Joe Lindsay	FW	7	2
(Scotland) George McArthur	FW	7	4
(Scotland) William McKinnon	FW	3	3
(Scotland) James Miller	FW	7	1

=== International Caps ===
An international trial match was played on 3 March 1883 to consider selection of teams to represent Scotland in the upcoming games against England and Wales. Joe Lindsay, James McAulay, William McKinnon and Peter Miller played for the 'Probables' against Robert 'Plumber' Brown, James Miller and Michael Paton for the 'Improbables.' Lindsay scored one of the 'Probables goals in their 4–3 win.

Subsequently, William McKinnon, earned his first and second caps and both James McAulay and Peter Miller earned their second and third caps against England and Wales respectively. In addition Michael Paton earned his first international cap for Scotland against England.

=== Representative Matches ===
Scotch Counties played a trial match against a Glasgow XI on 6 January 1883 to decide on the team to play Lancashire, with Robert 'Sparrow' Brown and William McKinnon playing - the result being a 4–4 draw. The following week, Brown, McKinnon and Peter Miller played for the 'Counties' against Lancashire - drawing 3-3.

On the same day as the Lancashire match, James McAulay, James Miller and Jock Hutcheson played for Scotch Counties in a trial match against a Glasgow XI, this time to consider the team to play against Birmingham & District. The result was a 4–0 win with Miller scoring one of the goals. On 27 January 1883, Jock Hutcheson, James McAulay, William McKinnon, James Miller and Peter Miller all played for the 'Counties' against Birmingham & District - drawing 2–2 with James Miller scoring one of the goals.

== Reserve Team ==
Dumbarton competed in the Scottish Second XI Cup, anxious to repeat their success of the previous season. Reports on these matches are sketchy, no doubt due to the overwhelming local interest in the Scottish Cup progress at the same time, but Dumbarton lost out in the final to Kilmarnock Athletic.

On 3 March 1883 a Dumbartonshire B XI played against a Glasgow B XI to raise funds for the Second Eleven Association. R Lindsay, Tom Veitch, G Galbraith, James Liddell, McIntyre and R Anderson were all selected to play for 'Dumbarton' in a 1–1 draw.
