= 1882–83 Scottish Cup =

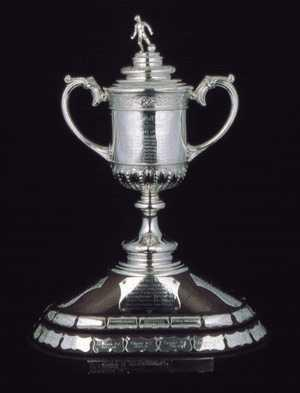
- The Scottish Cup trophy

Tournament details
- Country: Scotland
- Teams: 126

Final positions
- Champions: Dumbarton (first title)
- Runners-up: Vale of Leven

Tournament statistics
- Matches played: 148
- Goals scored: 834 (5.64 per match)

The 1882–83 Scottish Cup – officially the Scottish Football Association Challenge Cup – was the tenth season of Scotland's most prestigious football knockout competition. Dumbarton won the cup for the first, and so far only, time when they beat Vale of Leven 2–1 in a replayed final.

Defending champions Queen's Park were knock-out by eventual winners Dumbarton in the quarter-finals.

== Calendar ==
As with the previous competitions, the eighth edition of the Scottish Cup took on the format of a traditional knockout tournament. For the earlier rounds, the names of competing teams were placed into lots according to their districts and drawn into pairs. The home team for each tie was determined by the toss of a coin unless it was mutually agreed or only one of the two clubs drawn against one another had a private ground. In the event of a draw, the team who lost the toss would have the choice of ground for the replay. A similar procedure was used for subsequent rounds however, any club which had received a bye in the previous round would first be drawn against one of the winners of the previous round. The names of winning teams were placed into one lot for later rounds. The choice of venue for the final matches was reserved to the Scottish Football Association.

Round	First match date	Fixtures			Clubs
Round	First match date	Original	Byes	Replays	Clubs
First Round	9 September 1882	59	7	7	125 → 67
Second Round	30 September 1882	32	3	6	67 → 36
Third Round	21 October 1882	16	4	4	36 → 22
Fourth Round	11 November 1882	11	0	1	22 → 11
Fifth Round	2 December 1882	3	5	2	11 → 8
Quarter-finals	23 December 1882	4	0	4	8 → 4
Semi-finals	24 February 1883	2	0	2	4 → 2
Final	31 March 1883	1	0	1	2 → 1

- Both Glasgow and Edinburgh Universities were given byes to the third round.
- Four teams qualified for the second round after drawing their first round replay.
- Two teams qualified for the third round after drawing their second round replay.
- Two teams qualified for the fourth round after drawing their third round second replay.

== Teams ==
Of the 126 teams, all bar one entered the competition in the first round. Aberdeen were admitted into the competition after the first round draw and entered in the second round.

Ayrshire	Forfarshire	Glasgow and Suburbs	Lanarkshire	Renfrewshire
Annbank; Ayr; Beith; Beith Thistle; Cumnock; Hurlford; Kilbirnie; Kilmarnock; Kilmarnock Athletic; Kilmarnock Portland; Largs Athletic; Lugar Boswell; Mauchline; Maybole; Rankinston Mountaineers; Stewarton Cunninghame	Aberdeen; Angus; Arbroath; Balgay; Dundee East End; Dundee Harp; Dundee Hibernian; Dundee Our Boys; Dundee West End; Perseverance; Strathmore	Alexandra Athletic; Apsley; Battlefield; Clyde; Cowlairs; Glasgow University; Granton; Jordanhill; Luton; Mavisbank; Northern; Partick; Partick Thistle; Petershill; Pilgrims; Pollokshields Athletic; Possilpark; Queen's Park; Rangers; South Western; Thistle; Whitefield; 1st Lanark RV; 3rd Lanark RV	Airdrie; Airdriehill; Airdrieonians; Bellshill; Cambuslang; Clarkston; Drumpellier; Hamilton Academical; Holytown; Plains Blue Bell; Royal Albert; Shotts; West Benhar; Wishaw	Abercorn; Arthurlie; Bute Rangers; Cartvale; Clippens; Glenpatrick; Greenock Southern; Johnstone; Johnstone Athletic; Johnstone Rovers; Kilbarchan; Ladyburn; Lochwinnoch; Morton; Paisley Athletic; Pollok; Port Glasgow Athletic; Renfrew; St Mirren; Sir John Maxwell; Thornliebank; Woodland; Woodside; Yoker
Dunbartonshire	Edinburgh	Perthshire	Southern Counties	Stirlingshire
Alclutha; Dumbarton; Jamestown; Kilmaronock Thistle; Renton; Vale of Leven; Vale of Leven Hibernians	Addiewell; Brunswick; Dunfermline; Edinburgh University; Heart of Midlothian; Hibernian; Kinleith; St Bernard's; West Calder	Coupar Angus; Dunblane; Vale of Athole; Vale of Teith	Drumlanrig Rangers; Dumfries Academicals; East End Rovers; Lochmaben; Moffat; Queen of the South Wanderers; 1st Dumfries RV; 5th Kirkcudbrightshire RV	Breadalbane; Dunipace; East Stirlingshire; Falkirk; King's Park; Lenzie; Milngavie; Southfield; Strathblane

== First round ==
=== Matches ===
==== Glasgow and Suburbs ====
Apsley received a bye to the second round. Glasgow University received a bye to the third round.

9 September 1882	Battlefield	2–4	Partick Thistle	Langside
				Stadium: Overdale Park

9 September 1882	Jordanhill	0–4	Rangers	Glasgow
			Watson (x2); Corbett (x2)	Stadium: Anniesland Park

9 September 1882	Pollokshields Athletic	6–5	Alexandra Athletic	Pollokshields
				Stadium: Pollok Park

9 September 1882	Queen's Park	12–1	Thistle	Crosshill
				Stadium: Hampden Park

9 September 1882	South Western	0–3	3rd Lanark RV	Govan
				Stadium: Copeland Park

9 September 1882	Cowlairs	4–1	Whitefield	Glasgow
				Stadium: Gourlay Park

9 September 1882	Mavisbank	3–1	Granton	Glasgow
				Stadium: Lorne Park

9 September 1882	Possilpark	0–6	Pilgrims	Possilpark
				Stadium: Saracen Park

9 September 1882	Clyde	4–0	Luton	Glasgow
				Stadium: Barrowfield Park

16 September 1882	1st Lanark RV	0–4	Northern	Glasgow
				Stadium: Burnbank Park

16 September 1882	Partick	5–0	Petershill	Partick
				Stadium: Inchview

==== Ayrshire district ====
9 September 1882	Lugar Boswell	4–1	Kilbirnie	Lugar
				Stadium: Rosebank Park

9 September 1882	Kilmarnock Portland	1–1	Hurlford	Kilmarnock
				Stadium: Hamilton Park

9 September 1882	Beith	4–2	Beith Thistle	Beith
				Stadium: Marshalland

9 September 1882	Kilmarnock Athletic	2–1	Cumnock	Kilmarnock
				Stadium: Holm Quarry

16 September 1882	Annbank	7–0	Largs Athletic	Annbank
				Stadium: Pebble Park

16 September 1882	Mauchline	0–2	Kilmarnock	Mauchline
			Hay; McSkimming	Stadium: Connell Park

16 September 1882	Stewarton Cunninghame	3–5	Ayr	Stewarton
				Stadium: Standalone Park

Maybole	w/o	Rankinston Mountaineers

==== Lanarkshire district ====
9 September 1882	Bellshill	1–2	West Benhar	Bellshill
				Stadium: Viewhill Park

9 September 1882	Airdrieonians	3–3	Royal Albert	Airdrie
				Stadium: Mavisbank Park

9 September 1882	Airdrie	5–1	Plains Blue Bell	Airdrie
				Stadium: Rochsoles

16 September 1882	Wishaw	2–0	Holytown	Wishaw

16 September 1882	Drumpellier	4–3 (Void)	Clarkston	Coatbridge
				Stadium: Drumpellier Cricket Ground

16 September 1882	Hamilton Academical	0–5	Cambuslang	Hamilton
				Stadium: South Haugh

16 September 1882	Airdriehill	0–7	Shotts	Airdrie
				Stadium: Airdriehill Park

==== Stirlingshire district ====
King's Park received a bye to the second round.

9 September 1882	Milngavie	2–1	East Stirlingshire	Milngavie
				Stadium: Drumclog

16 September 1882	Dunipace	1–5	Falkirk	Denny
				Stadium: Broomhill

16 September 1882	Lenzie	0–1	Strathblane	Lenzie
				Stadium: Lenzie Football Field

Southfield	w/o	Breadalbane

==== Forfarshire district ====
9 September 1882	Dundee Harp	7–2	Perseverance	Dundee
				Stadium: Tayside Park

9 September 1882	Arbroath	4–3	Dundee East End	Arbroath
				Stadium: Gayfield Park

9 September 1882	Angus	0–1	Balgay	Forfar
				Stadium: Bankhead Farm

9 September 1882	Dundee Our Boys	5–1	Dundee Hibernian	Dundee
				Stadium: West Craigie Park

16 September 1882	Strathmore	0–1	Dundee West End	Dundee
				Stadium: Rollo's Pier

==== Renfrewshire district ====
9 September 1882	Abercorn	10–1	Ladyburn	Paisley
				Stadium: Blackstoun Park

9 September 1882	Woodland	1–1	Sir John Maxwell	Paisley

9 September 1882	Arthurlie	7–0	Bute Rangers	Barrhead
				Stadium: Dunterlie Park

9 September 1882	St Mirren	8–0	Yoker	Paisley
				Stadium: Thistle Park

9 September 1882	Clippens	2–3	Glenpatrick	Linwood
				Stadium: Moss Park

9 September 1882	Johnstone	6–2	Paisley Athletic	Johnstone
				Stadium: Cartbank Park

9 September 1882	Port Glasgow Athletic	3–2	Lochwinnoch	Port Glasgow
				Stadium: Devol Farm

9 September 1882	Morton	2–1	Johnstone Rovers	Greenock
				Stadium: Cappielow

16 September 1882	Johnstone Athletic	0–3	Cartvale	Johnstone
				Stadium: Mossbank Park

16 September 1882	Thornliebank	7–1	Greenock Southern	Thornliebank
				Stadium: Deacon's Bank Park

16 September 1882	Pollok	3–2	Renfrew	Pollokshaws
				Stadium: Broom Park

16 September 1882	Woodside	0–6	Kilbarchan	Paisley
				Stadium: Regent's Park

==== Dunbartonshire district ====
Vale of Leven received a bye to the second round.

9 September 1882	Alclutha	1–3	Renton	Dumbarton
				Stadium: Woodyard Park

9 September 1882	Jamestown	7–1	Vale of Leven Hibernians	Jamestown
				Stadium: Balloch Road

Kilmaronock Thistle	w/o	Dumbarton

==== Edinburgh district ====
Edinburgh University received a bye to the third round.

9 September 1882	Heart of Midlothian	1–1	St Bernard's	Edinburgh
	Wood		McNaughton	Stadium: Tynecastle Fields

16 September 1882	Hibernian	8–0	Brunswick	Edinburgh
				Stadium: Hibernian Park

West Calder	w/o	Kinleith

Addiewell	w/o	Dunfermline

==== Perthshire district ====
16 September 1882	Vale of Athole	0–1	Vale of Teith	Pitlochry
				Stadium: Recreation Park

16 September 1882	Coupar Angus	1–3 (Void)	Dunblane	Coupar Angus
				Stadium: Larghan Park

==== Southern Counties ====
16 September 1882	Moffat	9–0	East End Rovers	Moffat
				Stadium: Ballplay Road

16 September 1882	5th Kirkcudbrightshire RV	8–0	Drumlanrig Rangers	Dumfries
				Stadium: Palmerston Park

1st Dumfries RV	w/o	Dumfries Academical

Queen of the South Wanderers	w/o	Lochmaben

=== Replays ===
==== Ayrshire district ====
16 September 1882	Hurlford	3–2	Kilmarnock Portland	Hurlford
				Stadium: Drumbiehill Park

==== Lanarkshire district ====
16 September 1882	Royal Albert	3–3	Airdrionians	Larkhall
				Stadium: Raploch Park

23 September 1882	Drumpellier	2–5	Clarkston	Coatbridge
				Stadium: Drumpellier Cricket Ground

==== Renfrewshire district ====
16 September 1882	Sir John Maxwell	5–3	Woodland	Pollokshaws
				Stadium: Norwood

==== Edinburgh district ====
16 September 1882	St Bernard's	3–4	Heart of Midlothian	Edinburgh
	Charlton; Drummond; Wilson		Ross; Waugh (x2); Wood	Stadium: Powderhall; Attendance: 3,000

==== Perthshire district ====
23 September 1882	Coupar Angus	1–6	Dunblane	Coupar Angus
				Stadium: Larghan Park

Notes

1. A-A protest by Clarkston that the ground was not of regulation size was upheld and a replay was ordered.
2. B-A protest by Coupar Angus was upheld and a replay was ordered.
3. C-Both teams qualified for the second round.

== Second round ==
=== Matches ===
==== Glasgow and Suburbs ====
30 September 1882	Cowlairs	13–0	Apsley	Glasgow
				Stadium: Gourlay Park

30 September 1882	Northern	0–0	Pollokshields Athletic	Glasgow
				Stadium: Hyde Park

30 September 1882	Partick	2–1	Pilgrims	Partick
				Stadium: Inchview

30 September 1882	Partick Thistle	14–2	Mavisbank	Partick
				Stadium: Jordanvale Park

30 September 1882	Queen's Park	3–2	Rangers	Crosshill
			McIntyre; Pringle	Stadium: Hampden Park; Attendance: 5,000

30 September 1882	3rd Lanark RV	2–0 (Void)	Clyde	Crosshill
				Stadium: Cathkin Park

==== Ayrshire district ====
30 September 1882	Lugar Boswell	6–1	Beith	Lugar
				Stadium: Rosebank Park

30 September 1882	Kilmarnock	2–6	Hurlford	Kilmarnock
	Hamilton			Stadium: Rugby Park

7 October 1882	Annbank	4–5	Kilmarnock Athletic	Annbank
				Stadium: Pebble Park

7 October 1882	Maybole	6–3	Ayr	Maybole
				Stadium: Myremill Holm

==== Lanarkshire district ====
30 September 1882	Royal Albert	3–5	Clarkston	Larkhall
				Stadium: Raploch Park

7 October 1882	Airdrieonians	1–3	Cambuslang	Airdrie
				Stadium: Mavisbank Park

7 October 1882	Airdrie	6–2	Wishaw	Airdrie
				Stadium: Rochsoles

7 October 1882	West Benhar	10–1	Shotts	Harthill
				Stadium: Harthill Mains

==== Dunbartonshire and Stirlingshire district ====
Falkirk received a bye to the third round.

30 September 1882	Dumbarton	8–0	King's Park	Dumbarton
				Stadium: Boghead Park

30 September 1882	Vale of Leven	16–0	Milngavie	Alexandria
				Stadium: North Street Park

30 September 1882	Southfield	1–14	Renton	Slamannan

7 October 1882	Jamestown	12–1	Strathblane	Jamestown
				Stadium: Balloch Road

==== Forfarshire and Perthshire district ====
30 September 1882	Dunblane	3–1	Arbroath	Dunblane
				Stadium: Kippencross Park

30 September 1882	Dundee Our Boys	5–3	Balgay	Dundee
				Stadium: West Craigie Park

30 September 1882	Vale of Teith	5–1	Dundee West End	Doune
				Stadium: Tullochan Knowe

7 October 1882	Aberdeen	1–4	Dundee Harp	Aberdeen
				Stadium: Holburn Cricket Ground

==== Renfrewshire district ====
30 September 1882	Kilbarchan	0–7	Johnstone	Kilbarchan
				Stadium: Whitlands

30 September 1882	Abercorn	2–2	Pollok	Paisley
				Stadium: Blackstoun Park

30 September 1882	Morton	5–1	St Mirren	Greenock
				Stadium: Cappielow

30 September 1882	Thornliebank	7–0	Glenpatrick	Thornliebank
				Stadium: Deacon's Bank Park

30 September 1882	Sir John Maxwell	5–3 (Void)	Port Glasgow Athletic	Pollokshaws
				Stadium: Norwood Park

30 September 1882	Cartvale	2–1 (Void)	Arthurlie	Busby
				Stadium: Cartbridge Park

==== Edinburgh district ====
7 October 1882	Addiewell	0–14	Heart of Midlothian	Addiewell
				Stadium: Cuthil Park

7 October 1882	West Calder	2–3	Hibernian	West Calder
				Stadium: Burngrange Park

==== Southern Counties ====
30 September 1882	5th Kirkcudbrightshire RV	5–3	Moffat	Dumfries
				Stadium: Palmerston Park

7 October 1882	Queen of the South Wanderers	5–3	1st Dumfries RV	Dumfries
				Stadium: Nunholm

=== Replays ===
==== Glasgow and Suburbs ====
7 October 1882	Pollokshields Athletic	4–0	Northern	Pollokshields
				Stadium: Pollok Park

7 October 1882	3rd Lanark RV	3–0	Clyde	Crosshill
				Stadium: Cathkin Park

==== Renfrewshire district ====
7 October 1882	Pollok	2–2	Abercorn	Pollokshaws
				Stadium: Broom Park

7 October 1882	Sir John Maxwell	2–6	Port Glasgow Athletic	Pollokshaws
				Stadium: Norwood Park

7 October 1882	Cartvale	1–3	Arthurlie	Busby
				Stadium: Cartbridge Park

Notes

1. D-A protest by Clyde was upheld and a replay was ordered.
2. E-First meeting of Morton and St Mirren.
3. F-A protest by Port Glasgow Athletic was upheld and a replay was ordered.
4. G-A protest by Arthurlie was upheld and a replay was ordered.
5. H-Both teams qualified for the third round.

== Third round ==
=== Matches ===
==== Glasgow and Lanarkshire district ====
Glasgow University received a bye to the fourth round.

21 October 1882	Pollokshields Athletic	3–0	West Benhar	Pollokshields
				Stadium: Pollok Park

21 October 1882	Queen's Park	13–0	Clarkston	Crosshill
				Stadium: Hampden Park

21 October 1882	Cambuslang	3–3	Partick Thistle	Cambuslang
				Stadium: Westburn Park

21 October 1882	Partick	4–0	Cowlairs	Partick
				Stadium: Inchview

21 October 1882	3rd Lanark RV	3–0	Airdrie	Crosshill
				Stadium: Cathkin Park

==== Ayrshire and Renfrewshire district ====
Hurlford received a bye to the fourth round.

21 October 1882	Arthurlie	1–0 (Void)	Thornliebank	Barrhead
				Stadium: Dunterlie Park

21 October 1882	Lugar Boswell	6–0	Pollok	Lugar
				Stadium: Rosebank Park

28 October 1882	Port Glasgow Athletic	2–5	Kilmarnock Athletic	Port Glasgow
				Stadium: Devol Farm

28 October 1882	Abercorn	8–0	Maybole	Paisley
				Stadium: Blackstoun Park

28 October 1882	Johnstone	2–1	Morton	Johnstone
				Stadium: Cartbank Park

==== Stirlingshire, Dunbartonshire and Edinburgh district ====
Edinburgh University and Hibernian received a bye to the fourth round.

21 October 1882	Falkirk	2–2	Renton	Falkirk
				Stadium: Blinkbonny

21 October 1882	Vale of Leven	8–1	Heart of Midlothian	Alexandria
				Stadium: North Street Park

21 October 1882	Dumbarton	8–1	Jamestown	Dumbarton
	R. S. Brown; Miller; Lindsay; Anderson (x3)			Stadium: Boghead Park

==== Forfarshire and Perthshire district ====
21 October 1882	Dundee Harp	0–5	Dunblane	Dundee
				Stadium: Tayside Park

28 October 1882	Vale of Teith	6–4	Dundee Our Boys	Doune
				Stadium: Tullochan Knowe

==== Dumfriesshire district ====
28 October 1882	Queen of the South Wanderers	3–2	5th Kirkcudbrightshire RV	Dumfries
				Stadium: Nunholm

=== Replays ===
==== Glasgow and Lanarkshire district ====
28 October 1882	Partick Thistle	3–3	Cambuslang	Partick
				Stadium: Jordanvale Park

==== Ayrshire and Renfrewshire district ====
28 October 1882	Arthurlie	0–0	Thornliebank	Barrhead

==== Stirlingshire, Dunbartonshire and Edinburgh district ====
28 October 1882	Renton	4–1	Falkirk	Renton
				Stadium: Tontine Park

=== Second replay ===
==== Ayrshire and Renfrewshire district ====
4 November 1882	Thornliebank	0–0	Arthurlie	Thornliebank
				Stadium: Deacon's Bank Park

Notes

1. I-A protest by Thornliebank was upheld and a replay was ordered.
2. J-Both teams qualified for the fourth round.

== Fourth round ==
=== Matches ===
11 November 1882	Vale of Teith	2–3	Hurlford	Doune
				Stadium: Tullochan Knowe

11 November 1882	Hibernian	2–2	Partick	Edinburgh
				Stadium: Hibernian Park; Attendance: 2,000

11 November 1882	Queen's Park	5–0	Cambuslang	Crosshill
				Stadium: Hampden Park

11 November 1882	Renton	3–5	Lugar Boswell	Renton
				Stadium: Tontine Park

11 November 1882	Dunblane	1–7	3rd Lanark RV	Dunblane
				Stadium: Kippencross Park

11 November 1882	Kilmarnock Athletic	5–2	Abercorn	Kilmarnock
				Stadium: Holm Quarry

11 November 1882	Johnstone	1–3	Pollokshields Athletic	Johnstone
				Stadium: Cartbank Park

11 November 1882	Thornliebank	0–3	Dumbarton	Thornliebank
			Lindsay	Stadium: Deacon's Bank Park

18 November 1882	Arthurlie	3–1	Queen of the South Wanderers	Barrhead
				Stadium: Dunterlie Park

25 November 1882	Edinburgh University	0–2	Vale of Leven	Edinburgh
				Stadium: Craiglockart

Partick Thistle	w/o	Glasgow University

=== Replay ===
18 November 1882	Partick	1–4	Hibernian	Partick
				Stadium: Inchview

== Fifth Round ==
Dumbarton, Kilmarnock Athletic, Partick Thistle, Pollokshields Athletic and 3rd Lanark RV received a bye to the quarter-finals.

=== Matches ===
2 December 1882	Lugar Boswell	1–1	Vale of Leven	Lugar
				Stadium: Rosebank Park

2 December 1882	Hibernian	3–4 (Void)	Arthurlie	Edinburgh
				Stadium: Hibernian Park

23 December 1882	Queen's Park	7–2	Hurlford	Crosshill
				Stadium: Hampden Park

=== Replays ===
23 December 1882	Vale of Leven	5–1	Lugar Boswell	Alexandria
				Stadium: North Street Park

23 December 1882	Arthurlie	6–0	Hibernian	Kinning Park
				Stadium: Kinning Park; Attendance: 3,000

Notes

1. K-A protest by Hibernian was upheld and a replay was ordered.

== Quarter-finals ==
=== Matches ===
23 December 1882	3rd Lanark RV	1–1	Pollokshields Athletic	Crosshill
				Stadium: Cathkin Park

30 December 1882	Arthurlie	1–1	Kilmarnock Athletic	Barrhead
				Stadium: Dunterlie Park

3 February 1883	Dumbarton	3–1	Queen's Park	Dumbarton
	R. P. Brown; McKinnon (x2)			Stadium: Boghead Park; Attendance: 10,000

10 February 1883	Partick Thistle	0–4	Vale of Leven	Partick
				Stadium: Jordanvale Park

=== Replays ===
3 February 1883	Pollokshields Athletic	5–2	3rd Lanark RV	Pollokshields
				Stadium: Pollok Park

3 February 1883	Kilmarnock Athletic	1–2 (Void)	Arthurlie	Kilmarnock
				Stadium: Holm Quarry

=== Second replay ===
10 February 1883	Arthurlie	1–1	Kilmarnock Athletic	Crosshill
				Stadium: Cathkin Park

=== Third replay ===
17 February 1883	Arthurlie	0–1	Kilmarnock Athletic	Crosshill
				Stadium: Cathkin Park

Notes

1. L-A protest by Kilmarnock Athletic was upheld and a replay was ordered.

== Semi-finals ==
=== Matches ===
24 February 1883	Pollokshields Athletic	0–1 (Void)	Dumbarton	Crosshill
				Stadium: Hampden Park

24 February 1883	Vale of Leven	1–1	Kilmarnock Athletic	Alexandria
				Stadium: North Street Park

=== Replays ===
17 March 1883	Dumbarton	5–0	Pollokshields Athletic	Dumbarton
	Paton; McKinnon; McArthur (x3)			Stadium: Boghead Park

17 March 1883	Kilmarnock Athletic	0–2	Vale of Leven	Kilmarnock
				Stadium: Holm Quarry

Notes

1. M-A protest by Pollokshields Athletic was upheld and a replay was ordered.

== Final ==
31 March 1883
15:00

Dumbarton	2–2	Vale of Leven
Paton 30'; McArthur 44'		Johnstone 35'; McCrea 70'

Hampden Park, Crosshill
Attendance: 15,000
Referee: Thomas Lawrie

=== Replay ===
7 April 1883
15:00

Dumbarton	2–1	Vale of Leven
R. P. Brown 47'; R. S. Brown 50'		Friel 80'

Hampden Park, Crosshill
Attendance: 8,000
Referee: Thomas Lawrie

== See also ==
- 1882–83 in Scottish football
