= 1884–85 British Home Championship =

Tournament details
- Host country: England, Ireland, Scotland and Wales
- Dates: 28 February – 11 April 1885
- Teams: 4

Final positions
- Champions: Scotland (2nd title)
- Runners-up: England

Tournament statistics
- Matches played: 6
- Goals scored: 37 (6.17 per match)
- Top scorer: (Scotland) Joseph Lindsay (4 goals)

The 1884–85 British Home Championship was the second edition of the British Home Championship annual international football tournament between the British Home Nations. It was staged from 28 February to 11 April 1885. Scotland successfully defended its 1884 title. The English also performed well, beginning with a strong victory over Ireland but failed to capitalise on this start with 1–1 draws with Wales and Scotland. Wales thrashed Ireland 8–1 but were well beaten 8–2 by Scotland who won their final game in a similar scoreline against Ireland, who finished last having conceded 20 goals in three games. Scotland, who had scored 16 goals in two tournaments, would win (individually or shared) six of the first seven tournaments.

== Table ==
Pos	Team	Pld	W	D	L	GF	GA	GD	Pts
1	Scotland (C)	3	2	1	0	17	4	+13	5
2	England	3	1	2	0	6	2	+4	4
3	Wales	3	1	1	1	10	11	−1	3
4	Ireland	3	0	0	3	4	20	−16	0

Rules for classification: 1) Points. The points system worked as follows: 2 points for a win and 1 point for a draw.
(C) Champions

== Results ==
28 February 1885

England	4–0	Ireland
Lofthouse; Bambridge; Spilsbury; Brown

Whalley Range, Greater Manchester
Attendance: 6,000
Referee: James McKillop (Scotland)

14 March 1885

England	1–1	Wales
Mitchell 35'		Lewis 37'

Leamington Road, Blackburn
Attendance: 7,500
Referee: Alexander Stewart (Scotland)

14 March 1885

Scotland	8–2	Ireland
Lamont 10'; Turner 12'; Calderwood 15'; Marshall 35'; Higgins 51', 60', 70'; Barbour 53'		Gibb 85', 90'

Hampden Park, Glasgow
Attendance: 6,000
Referee: William Peirce Dix (England)

21 March 1885

England	1–1	Scotland
Bambridge 57'		Lindsay 20'

The Oval, London
Attendance: 8,000
Referee: John Sinclair (Ireland)

23 March 1885

Wales	1–8	Scotland
Jones 50'	Scottish FA	Calderwood 8', 80' (Note: The SFA website, RSSSF website and London Hearts website credit Robert Calderwood with two goals against Wales; Andy Mitchell's book and John Litster's files assign the first of these to William Anderson (this would make a hat-trick for Anderson, completed earlier chronologically than that of Joseph Lindsay).); Anderson 20', 76'; Allan 30'; Lindsay 56', 84', 88'

Racecourse Ground, Wrexham
Attendance: 4,000
Referee: Robert M. Sloane (England)

11 April 1885

Ireland	2–8	Wales
Dill 40'; Molyneux 23'		Sisson 52', 59', 60'; Roach 55', 64'; Owen 50'; Burke 69'; Jones 89'

Ulster Cricket Ground, Belfast
Attendance: 1,500
Referee: John McDowall (Scotland)

== Winning squad ==
- Scotland

Name	Apps/Goals by opponent			Total	
Name	(Wales) WAL	(Ireland) IRE	(England) ENG	Apps	Goals
Robert Calderwood	1/2	1/1	1	3	3
Joe Lindsay	1/3		1/1	2	4
William Anderson	1/2		1	2	2
David Allan	1/1		1	2	1
James McAulay	1		1	2	0
Walter Arnott	1		1	2	0
Michael Paton	1		1	2	0
Alexander Hamilton	1		1	2	0
Bob Kelso	1	1		2	0
Sandy Higgins Sr		1/3		1	3
Alexander Barbour		1/1		1	1
Walter Lamont		1/1		1	1
John Marshall		1/1		1	1
Willie Turner		1/1		1	1
Charles Campbell			1	1	0
John J. Gow			1	1	0
William Sellar			1	1	0
William Chalmers		1		1	0
Hugh McHardy		1		1	0
Jimmy Niven		1		1	0
John McPherson		1		1	0
Hugh Wilson	1			1	0
Robert P. Brown	1			1	0
