= Robert McCrae =

Robert McCrae may refer to:

- Robert McCrae (footballer), Scottish footballer
- Robert R. McCrae (born 1949), psychologist
