= Hibernian F.C. (Dundee) =

Former association football club in Scotland

Hibernian (Dundee)
- Full name: Hibernian Football Club
- Founded: 1879
- Dissolved: 1884
- Ground: Menzies Park
- Hon. Secretary: Francis Hughes
- Match Secretary: Joseph Birmingham, Peter Connelly, Peter R. Dolan
Home colours

Hibernian Football Club from Dundee, usually referred to as Hibernians (Dundee) or occasionally Dundee Hibernian where there was the likelihood of confusion with Hibernian F.C. from Edinburgh, was an association football club from Dundee, Tayside.

== History ==
The club was formed in 1879, in the same year as fellow Dundonian diaspora club Harp, and its registered name was simply Hibernian. Its earliest recorded match was a defeat to Coupar Angus in 1880.

With 30 members in 1882 it was one of the smallest senior clubs in Dundee, only West End being smaller; Harp was twice the size, having joined the Scottish Football Association in 1881 and therefore attracting the Irish-origin players who wanted to play, and fans who wanted to watch, senior football.

Hibernian and West End, along with another small Dundee side, Perseverance, all joined the Scottish FA in August 1882, all three having been turned down two months earlier because of their lack of a private ground (while East End had been admitted).

The club's competitive debut came in the first round of the 1882–83 Scottish Cup, with a 5–1 defeat at Our Boys, Hibernian outclassed from the start and its only goal being a right-wing cross-cum-shot which drifted under the tape.

In the Cup the following season, the Hibernian was drawn to face Perseverance, and lost 4–3 in a replay, played at Our Boys' West Craigie, after a 2–2 draw. Hibernian protested to the Scottish FA in relation to some refereeing decisions; the Scottish FA dismissed the protest unanimously, and the 10s protest deposit retained.

One week after its Scottish Cup defeat, the club played East End in the first Forfarshire Cup, but was hammered 8–0; Spalding of the East End scoring six goals, the first inside the first minute. Hibernians kept the scoring down in the second half by innovating an offside trap, one of the two full-backs pushing up to midfield.

The tie marked the club's last known appearance, and it did not renew its Scottish FA membership for the 1884–85 season. A Junior club of the same name, playing at Clepington Park, started up in September 1884 and lasted until 1888.

== Colours ==
The club wore green and black hooped shirts with white knickers.

== Ground ==
In common with many Dundee clubs, the Hibernian used Magdalen Green as its home until it required a private ground to join the Scottish FA. Its private ground as a senior club was Menzies Hill, half-a-mile from Dundee railway station.
