= Southfield F.C. (Scotland) =

Former association football club in Scotland

Southfield
- Full name: Southfield Football Club
- Founded: 1879
- Dissolved: 1883
- Ground: Slamannan Glebe
- Hon. Secretary: Gavin Black
- Match Secretary: James Connelly
Home colours

Southfield Football Club was a Scottish association football club based in the village of Slamannan, Stirlingshire.

== History ==
The club was founded in October 1879 and it joined the Scottish Football Association in 1881, despite only playing 5 matches the previous season. With 18 members for its two senior seasons, it was the smallest senior club in Scottish football history. It had links to the local mining industry; the club's first honorary secretary, Gavin Black, was a coal master at Easter Moffat in Plains, North Lanarkshire, and its second, William Black, worked at Stanrigg colliery.

With few opportunities to play, as there were no local competitions, the club's only competitive football came in the Scottish Cup. The club entered twice. Its first entry, in 1881–82, ended with a 3–0 defeat in the first round to Milton of Campsie. Southfield sought to protest the result - the only protest in the round - but, perhaps as a sign of the straitened resources of the tiny club, it did not send the 10s deposit, so the Scottish FA refused to consider the protest.

In the 1882–83 Scottish Cup, Southfield obtained the benefit of a walkover into the second round, as Aberfeldy Breadalbane did not travel to Slamannan for the first round tie. For the second round draw, which was on a regional basis, the Scottish FA agreed to a motion that the 5 surviving clubs of Stirlingshire be included in a division with the 4 surviving clubs of Dunbartonshire. This proved disastrous for the Stirlingshire clubs, as the standard of football in Dunbartonshire was much higher, with factories providing sinecure jobs for leading players. The consequence was that, apart from Falkirk which had the good fortune of a bye, the 4 Stirlingshire clubs all suffered heavy defeats to the Dunbartonshire clubs. Southfield - the only one of the quartet drawn at home - had to play the rising Renton side, and lost 14–1, conceding six in the first half.

The club gave up the unequal struggle in 1883, not renewing its membership of the Scottish FA.

== Colours ==
The club played in blue.

== Ground ==
The club's ground was Slamannan Glebe, half-a-mile from Slamannan railway station, and it used the Crown Hotel for facilities. The ground was described as being "in the most primitive description, there being no touch line nor ropes".
