= Jimmy Brown (football manager) =

Scottish football manager

Jimmy Brown is a Scottish former association football manager. He was the manager from March 1999 to October 2000 of Dumbarton.

Having gone through a mediocre first season in charge, he resigned from his position in the autumn of 2000. Brown was succeeded by his former assistant Tom Carson.

== Managerial Statistics ==
As of October 2000

Team	Nat	From	To	Record				
Team	Nat	From	To	G	W	D	L	Win %
Dumbarton	(Scotland)	March 1999	October 2000	66	26	10	30	39.39
