= Hugh Wilson (Scottish footballer) =

Scottish footballer

Personal information
- Full name: Hugh Wilson
- Date of birth: 5 August 1859
- Place of birth: Mauchline, Scotland
- Date of death: 14 December 1946 (aged 87)
- Place of death: Dumbarton, Scotland
- Positions: Right back; centre half

Senior career*
Years	Team	Apps	(Gls)
1877–1884	Mauchline		
1884–1886	Dumbarton		

International career
1885	Scotland	1	(0)
- * Club domestic league appearances and goals

Hugh Wilson (5 August 1859 – 14 December 1946) was a Scottish international footballer who played for Dumbarton in the 1880s.

He began his career at hometown club Mauchline and was playing for them in 1878 when they won the Ayrshire Cup, and represented the county in several of the regional challenge matches which were played in that era against the likes of Edinburgh and Birmingham. He moved to Dumbarton in 1884.

Wilson was capped once by Scotland when he played against Wales on 23 March 1885. He was included in the team as a late replacement for his Dumbarton colleague Leitch Keir, with the appearance wrongly attributed to Keir in most reference books for several decades afterwards.
