= Kenny Wilson (footballer) =

Scottish footballer (1946–2025)

Personal information
- Full name: Kenneth Malcolm Wilson
- Date of birth: 15 September 1946
- Place of birth: Dumbarton
- Date of death: 17 January 2025
- Place of death: Dumbarton
- Position: Forward

Youth career
- 1964-1967: Beith Juniors

Senior career*
Years	Team	Apps	(Gls)
1968–1970	St Johnstone	11	(4)
1970–1972	Dumbarton	74	(67)
1972–1974	Carlisle United	20	(1)
1973	→ York City (loan)	17	(0)
1973	→ Workington (loan)	5	(0)
1974	Hamilton Academical	11	(2)
- * Club domestic league appearances and goals

Kenny Wilson (15 September 1946 - 17 January 2025) was a Scottish professional footballer who played as a forward.

His main achievement was in the 1971–72 season, when he played for the Dumbarton team that won the Second Division. He set the record for the most goals scored for Dumbarton in that season, scoring all the goals in a 5–0 victory over Raith Rovers.
