= Roy McCormack =

Scottish footballer

Personal information
- Full name: Roy McCormack
- Date of birth: 12 February 1949 (age 77)
- Position: Forward

Senior career*
Years	Team	Apps	(Gls)
1966–1976	Dumbarton	246	(113)
1976–1977	APIA		
1977–1979	Dundee	2	(0)
1978–1979	Airdrie	3	(1)
1978–1980	East Stirling	40	(8)
- * Club domestic league appearances and goals

Roy McCormack (born 12 February 1949) was a Scottish footballer who played for Dumbarton, APIA, Dundee, Airdrie and East Stirling.

McCormack joined Dumbarton in 1967 from Scottish junior side Yoker Athletic. There he formed a potent attacking partnership with Kenny Wilson and was part of the 1971-72 Division 2 Championship winning team. After nine seasons with Dumbarton, involving 307 appearances and scoring 131 goals, McCormack had the misfortune of suffering a broken leg. Eventually he moved on to join his old teammate, the Lisbon Lion Willie Wallace who was managing Australian side APIA.

After two seasons he moved back to Scotland with Wallace when the latter became assistant to Tommy Gemmell at Dundee. He finished his career with seasons at Airdrie and East Stirling.
