= James Liddell (1880s footballer) =

Scottish footballer

Personal information
- Full name: James Liddell
- Position: Winger

Senior career*
Years	Team	Apps	(Gls)
1880–1886	Dumbarton		
- * Club domestic league appearances and goals

James Liddell was a Scottish footballer who played in the 1880s.

== Career ==
Liddell played club football in Scotland, joining Dumbarton where he was to spend the best part of six seasons.

== Honours ==
Dumbarton

- Dumbartonshire Cup: Winners 1884-85
- Glasgow Charity Cup: Runners Up 1884-85
- 4 representative caps for Dumbartonshire between 1884 and 1886, scoring one goal.
