= Dunterlie Park (1882–1906) =

Football ground in Barrhead, Scotland

- Location within East Renfrewshire
- Location: Barrhead, Scotland
- Coordinates: 55.8056°N 4.3838°W
- Surface: Grass
- Record attendance: 6,000

Construction
- Opened: 1882
- Closed: 1906

Tenant
- Arthurlie

Dunterlie Park was a football ground in Barrhead, Scotland. It was the home ground of Arthurlie between 1882 and 1906, and was the first of three grounds to bear the same name.

== History ==
Arthurlie moved to Dunterlie Park in 1882 from their Cross Arthurlie ground. The club was elected to Division Two of the Scottish Football League in 1901, and the first SFL match was played at the ground on 24 August 1901 when Port Glasgow Athletic were beaten 3–1.

Although the ground had no spectator facilities (the sole structure being a pavilion behind the southern end of the pitch), its probable record attendance was 6,000, set for a Scottish Cup first round against Rangers on 27 January 1906, a game which Arthurlie lost 7–1. Arthurlie left the ground later in the year to move to a new stadium, also named Dunterlie Park. Their final league match at the first Dunterlie Park was played on 7 April 1906, a 3–1 defeat to Hamilton Academical. The site was later used for housing, with Rufflees Avenue built through the middle of where the pitch had been.
