= Perseverance F.C. =

Former association football club in Scotland

Perseverance
- Full name: Perseverance Football Club
- Nickname(s): the Persé
- Founded: 1879
- Dissolved: 1885
- Ground: Angus Park
- Secretary: James Mitchell, Robert Low
- Captain: G. Donaldson, Thomas Fraser
Home colours

The Perseverance Football Club was an association football club from Dundee, Scotland.

== History ==
The Perseverance club was founded on 5 July 1879 at a meeting in the Cricketers' Arms in Dundee, with a reserve side called Perseverance Swifts in tow. At the end of 1881 the club obtained financial backing from Dundonian coach proprietor David Stratton and, after an unbeaten season, took the plunge into the senior game by joining the Scottish Football Association for the 1882–83 season, moving to a private ground to be eligible for SFA membership.

The club found the step-up to senior football a major change. In its first senior match, the first round of the 1882–83 Scottish Cup, was a 7–2 defeat at Dundee Harp. In 1883–84, it lost in the first round of the first Forfarshire Cup to Strathmore (Arbroath), but did win in the first round of the 1883–84 Scottish Cup, beating Dundee Hibernian 4–3 in a replay, played at Our Boys' West Craigie, after a 2–2 draw. Hibernians protested to the Scottish FA in relation to some refereeing decisions; the Scottish FA dismissed the protest unanimously.

The club withdrew from its second round tie with Arbroath, perhaps fearing an inevitable defeat, and the club seems to have ground to a halt before the 1884–85 season; its membership of 35 had not grown in three years and the club was much the smallest senior side in Dundee, the only other club with double-digit membership being West End, which had 60 members. The two clubs were drawn together in the first round of the 1884–85 Scottish Cup, but despite advertising up to the date of the match, Perseverance did not turn up. A week later, in the county cup, Perseverance was humiliated 7–0 at West Craigie by the unknown Victoria club, which only played for one season. By the end of the season the club was playing minor opposition and it was struck from the Scottish FA roster in August 1885.

== Colours ==
The club played wore 1" black and white hooped jerseys and white knickers.

== Grounds ==
Before turning senior, the club played on Magdalen Green. From 1882 the club rented Angus Park on Den's [sic] Road from Mr Cooper of Clepington Farm.
