= Duncan Stewart (footballer, born 1860) =

Scottish footballer

Personal information
- Date of birth: c. 1860
- Place of birth: Greenock, Scotland
- Position: Full back

Senior career*
Years	Team	Apps	(Gls)
- Morton
1884	Port Glasgow Athletic	0	(0)
1887–1892	Dumbarton		
1893-1994	Port Glasgow Athletic	4	(0)
Total		4	(0)

International career
1888	Scotland	1	(0)
- * Club domestic league appearances and goals

Duncan Stewart (born c. 1860) was a Scottish footballer who played as a full back.

== Career ==
Stewart played club football for Morton, Port Glasgow Athletic, Dumbarton and internationally for Scotland.

== Honours ==
Dumbarton

- Dumbartonshire Cup: Winners 1888-1889
- Greenock Charity Cup: Runners Up 1888-89
- 1 cap for Scotland in 1888;
- 5 representative matches for Dumbartonshire between 1887 and 1890.

== See also ==
- List of Scotland national football team captains
