= Johnny Haddow =

Scottish footballer and manager

John Haddow
Personal information
- Place of birth: Plean, Scotland
- Position: Forward

Youth career
- Linlithgow Rose

Senior career*
Years	Team	Apps	(Gls)
1927–1928	Rangers		
1928–1931	Dumbarton	102	(45)
1931–1933	King's Park		
1933–1936	Dumbarton	71	(62)
1935–1936	Falkirk		
1936–1937	Leith Athletic		

Managerial career
- 1956–1962: Clyde
- * Club domestic league appearances and goals

John Haddow was a Scottish football player and manager, best known for winning the 1958 Scottish Cup as manager of Clyde. Haddow played for Linlithgow Rose, Rangers, Dumbarton, King's Park, Falkirk and Leith Athletic.
