= Thomas Hamilton (footballer, born 1872) =

Scottish footballer

Personal information
- Date of birth: 22 March 1872
- Place of birth: Dundee, Scotland
- Date of death: 17 October 1942 (aged 70)
- Place of death: Kilmarnock, Scotland
- Position: Right half

Senior career*
Years	Team	Apps	(Gls)
- Kilmarnock
- Hurlford United
- Nottingham Forest

International career
1891	Scotland	1	(0)
- * Club domestic league appearances and goals

Thomas Hamilton (22 March 1872 – 17 October 1942) was a Scottish footballer who played as a right half.

== Career ==
Born in Dundee, Hamilton played club football for Kilmarnock, Hurlford United and Nottingham Forest, and made one appearance for Scotland in 1891.
