= Peter Miller (footballer, born 1858) =

Scottish footballer

Personal information
- Date of birth: 2 February 1858
- Place of birth: Kilmun, Scotland
- Date of death: 11 October 1914 (aged 56)
- Place of death: West Hartlepool, England
- Position: Centre-half

Senior career*
| Years | Team | Apps | (Gls) |
| 1875–1884 | Dumbarton | | |
| 1884–1885 | Partick | | |
| 1885–1888 | Dumbarton | | |

International career
| 1882–1883 | Scotland | 3 | (0) |
- * Club domestic league appearances and goals

Peter Miller (2 February 1858 – 11 October 1914) was a Scottish footballer who played as a centre-half.

== Career ==
Miller played football for Dumbarton, Partick, and Scotland.

== Honours ==
Dumbarton

- Scottish Cup: Winners 1882–83 - Runners Up 1880–81;1881–82;1886–87
- Dumbartonshire Cup: Winners 1884–85
- Glasgow Charity Cup: Runners Up 1881–82;1884–85
- 3 caps for Scotland between 1881 and 1883
- 4 representative caps for Scotch Counties between 1881 and 1883
- 6 representative caps for Dunbartonshire between 1884 and 1887
- 6 international trial matches for Scotland between 1878 and 1884.
