= Dan Friel =

Scottish footballer (1860–1911)

Personal information
- Full name: Daniel Friel
- Date of birth: 1860
- Place of birth: Bonhill, Scotland
- Date of death: July 15, 1911 (aged 50-51)
- Place of death: Glasgow, Scotland
- Position: Utility player

Senior career*
Years	Team	Apps	(Gls)
1882	Vale of Leven	?	(?)
1883	Accrington	–	(–)
1883–1889	Burnley	27	(1)
1890	Nelson	?	(?)
1891	Vale of Leven	?	(?)
- * Club domestic league appearances and goals

Daniel Friel (1860–1911) was a Scottish professional footballer who played as a centre half. He started his career in his native Scotland with Vale of Leven before moving to England to join Accrington in 1883. Later that year, Friel was signed by nearby Burnley and he made his debut for the club in the friendly match against Witton on 10 November 1883. However, the game was abandoned at half-time after the visitors refused to play in the heavy rain despite being a goal ahead. Friel scored his first goals for Burnley in the 5–0 win against Eagley two weeks later. Over the following seasons, he became an integral member of the Burnley team and was part of the side that won the Hospital Cup in 1884 and 1886. In the 1886 final, he netted the second goal in a 2–0 win over local rivals Padiham.

Friel scored the only hat-trick of his Burnley career on 29 November 1885 as Derby Midland were beaten 8–0 at Turf Moor. In May 1886, he was selected to represent a Burnley District select team in a match against Padiham to raise funds for the local hospital.

== 1888-1889 ==
Relatively small in stature, but a very talented footballer, Danny Friel was the only ever-present in Burnley's side during the historic first season of League football in 1888–89. Burnley were one of the founding members of the Football League in 1888 and Friel remained one of the club's first-choice players as competitive football commenced.

Dannie Friel made his League debut on 8 September 1888, playing as a centre-half, at Deepdale, the home of Preston North End. Preston North End won the match 5–2.

On 20 October 1888 Dannie Friel was supplanted as Burnley' oldest League player by Thomas Midgley. Dannie Friel had been the oldest Burnley League player from 8 September 1888 to 20 October 1888.

Friel featured in all 22 of Burnley's league matches during the 1888–89 season. Playing as a centre-half in 21 appearances, he contributed to a Burnley defense that secured four clean sheets and limited the opposition to conceding only one goal in a match on two separate occasions. Dannie Friel was the only Burnley player to play in all 22 League games in season 1888-89.

On 5 October 1889, Friel scored his first Football League goal in the 2–6 home defeat to Aston Villa. The following month he announced that he was to leave Burnley, having played 27 league matches and scored one goal. In total, Friel had made more than 300 appearances for the club, many of them as team captain. After leaving Burnley, he returned to non-League football with Nelson.
