= Partick F.C. (1875) =

Former association football club in Scotland

Partick Football and Cricket Club
- Full name: Partick Football Club
- Founded: 1875
- Dissolved: 1885
- Ground: Inchview
Home colours

Partick Football Club was a football club based in the burgh of Partick (now part of the city of Glasgow), Scotland. The club was founded in 1875 and played their home games at Inchview on Dumbarton Road in the Whiteinch neighbourhood until they went defunct in 1885.

== History ==
In the early uptake of football in the west of Scotland, many clubs were formed in conjunction with the practice of cricket – the first-ever international football match had been played at Hamilton Crescent cricket ground in Partick in 1872. Partick F.C. were formed for enthusiasts of both sports on 23 March 1875, and developed their basic grounds during that summer. The Scottish Football League would not be formed for some years, but Partick immediately applied for membership of the Scottish Football Association and entered the Scottish Cup from the 1875–76 season.

Through connections of players including William Kirkham, matches were organised between Partick and Lancashire teams Darwen and Blackburn Rovers – among the earliest cross-border fixtures – with the Scottish team winning most of them, some by large margins. Although officially amateur, the English clubs enticed some of Partick's players south to play for them, including Jimmy Love and Fergie Suter, now recognised as the first professional footballers, and William Struthers (a guest player from Rangers) who became one of the first managers of Bolton Wanderers.

Partick had little impact on the Scottish Cup, and a local rival emerged in the form of Partick Thistle who also moved to Whiteinch (though a different ground) in 1880. Partick won their first meeting that year at Inchview by a 5–1 scoreline, but Thistle also began to compete in the Scottish Cup, won the next meetings 5–2 and 3–1, continued that run the following year and increased their popularity among locals after moving nearer to the heart of the burgh at Muir Park (close to Hamilton Crescent) in 1883. That year, both clubs joined the newly formed Glasgow Football Association.

In summer 1885, it was announced that Partick F.C. had gone defunct and Partick Thistle would be moving in as tenants at Inchview; they continued to play there until 1897 (although not stated as a merger or takeover at the time, effectively that is what occurred).

== Colours ==
The club played in red and blue one-inch hooped jerseys and hose, with white knickers, until 1880. Until the club's final season it wore white shirts and navy knickers, and then changed to the West of Scotland rugby colours of black, red, and gold; later coincidentally adopted by Partick Thistle.

== Ground ==
The club played at Inchview Park in Whiteinch.
