= Kilmaronock Thistle F.C. =

Association football club in Dunbartonshire, Scotland

Kilmaronock Thistle
- Full name: Kilmaronock Thistle Football Club
- Founded: 1874
- Dissolved: 1884
- Ground: Ardoch, Ross Lane Park
- Hon. Secretary: John M'Neil, Robert M'Kinlay
Home colours

Kilmaronock Thistle Football Club was an association football club based in the village of Gartocharn, in Dunbartonshire.

== History ==
The club was founded in 1874, and took its name from Kilmaronock Parish, in which the village is situated. It was occasionally referred to as simply Kilmaronock or as Kilmaronock Lochlomondside, and was often mistaken for a side from Kilmarnock.

The club joined the Scottish Football Association in September 1877 and entered the Scottish Cup for the 1877–78 campaign, but withdrew when paired with Vale of Leven, one of the strongest clubs in the world at the time. This would become a pattern, as the early rounds of the Scottish Cup in the period were drawn on a geographical basis, and Dunbartonshire almost always provided one of the Cup finalists. Therefore, although Kilmaronock entered every year until 1883–84, it withdrew after the draw four times.

Kilmaronock did play in the competition on three occasions. In 1878–79, the club lost 4–0 at Helensburgh in the first round, having ceded home advantage. In 1879–80, the club was drawn to visit Renton in the first round, and gained a 2–2 draw. In the home replay, however, the Thistle lost 8–0, the club losing its two best players for the match.

The last time the club played a match in the competition was in 1881–82, against Helensburgh again, this time losing 6–2 at home. The Kilmaronock side was the heavier side, but the visitors displayed "greater science and training in their play", and were 2–0 up inside ten minutes.

One difficulty the club had was in attracting new players; its membership stayed around the 40 mark throughout its senior existence, while clubs such as Vale of Leven Hibernians went from fewer to many more. The club's final Cup entry resulted in a withdrawal when drawn against Jamestown, being unable to raise an XI. The club was one of the 33 struck off the Scottish Football Association register in August 1884, the final indignity being that even the agenda for the relevant meeting listed the club as Kilmarnock Thistle.

== Kilmarnock Thistle ==
The club should not be confused with Kilmarnock Thistle, from Kilmarnock in Ayrshire. The Ayrshire side, founded in 1886, entered the Scottish Cup only in 1888–89 and withdrew before playing a tie.

== Colours ==
The club's colours were red shirts, navy knickers with a red stripe, and red hose.

== Ground ==
The club originally played at Ross Lane Park, two miles from Caldarvan railway station. From 1880 its ground was given as Ardoch, but this may have been the same location. Players used the Gartocharn Inn for facilities.
