= Ralph Aitken =

Scottish footballer

Personal information
- Full name: Ralph Allan Aitken
- Date of birth: 16 February 1863
- Place of birth: Kilbarchan, Scotland
- Date of death: 10 January 1928 (aged 64)
- Place of death: Dumbarton, Scotland
- Position: Winger

Senior career*
Years	Team	Apps	(Gls)
1883–1886	Dumbarton		
1886–1887	Newcastle West End		
1886–1890	Dumbarton		
1889–1890	Newcastle West End		

International career
1886–1888	Scotland	2	(1)
- * Club domestic league appearances and goals

Ralph Aitken (16 February 1863 – 10 January 1928) was a Scottish international footballer.

== Career ==
Aitken played for Dumbarton, Newcastle West End, and Scotland.

== Honours ==
Dumbarton

- Scottish Cup: Runners Up 1886–87
- 2 caps for Scotland between 1885 and 1888, scoring 1 goal
- 6 representative caps for Dunbartonshire between 1883 and 1889, scoring 2 goals.
