= Leitch Keir =

Scottish footballer

Personal information
- Full name: Leitch Keir
- Date of birth: 22 June 1861
- Place of birth: Alloa, Scotland
- Date of death: 29 June 1922 (aged 61)
- Place of death: Dumbarton, Scotland
- Positions: Centre half; left half

Youth career
- Renton

Senior career*
Years	Team	Apps	(Gls)
1881–1897	Dumbarton	49	(2)

International career
1886–1888	Scotland	4	(1)
- * Club domestic league appearances and goals

Leitch Keir (22 June 1861 – 29 June 1922) was a Scottish footballer who played for Renton, Dumbarton and Scotland.

Having won the Scottish Cup with Dumbarton in 1883, he was the sole member of that team still with the club when they were joint champions of the inaugural Scottish Football League in 1891, becoming the first player to claim medals from both competitions; the distinction was almost shared by all his teammates, but they had lost the 1891 Scottish Cup Final three months earlier. The Sons of the Rock went on to win the title outright in 1892. Keir ceased playing regularly in 1893, but returned for one cup appearance four years later.

== Honours ==
Dumbarton

- Scottish Football League: 1890–91, 1891–92
- Scottish Cup: 1882–83
  - Runner-up 1886–87, 1890–91
- Dumbartonshire Cup: Winners 1888–89, 1889–90, 1890-91, 1891-92
- League Charity Cup: 1890–91
- Glasgow Merchants Charity Cup: Runner-up 1884–85
- Greenock Charity Cup: Winner 1889–90; Runner-up 1888–89
- 4 caps for Scotland between 1886 and 1888, scoring one goal;
- 9 representative caps between 1884 and 1890 (7 for Dumbartonshire, 1 for a West of Scotland XI and 1 for a Scots Anglo XI).
