= Robert McCrae (footballer) =

Scottish footballer

Personal information
- Full name: Robert McCrae
- Place of birth: Scotland
- Position: Inside forward

Senior career*
Years	Team	Apps	(Gls)
1885	Vale of Leven		
1888–1889	Burnley	2	(0)
1889	Burnley Union Star		
- * Club domestic league appearances and goals

Robert McCrae was a Scottish professional footballer who played as an inside forward. Robert McCrae was a stonemason by trade and he was described as a craftsman with the ball. He was described by a commentator of that time as "able to manipulate it like few players could and had no superior as a dribbler". He signed for Burnley in 1884 playing and scoring regularly at senior level up to the formation of the Football League. The start of the Football League era coincided with the start of the decline of McCrae' skills as a footballer and he only got to play three times for Burnley in 1888–1889. He played his debut League match for Burnley on 3 November 1888 at Turf Moor, Burnley. McCrae was picked to play outside-right in place of Jack Hibbert. Burnley' visitors were high-flying Blackburn Rovers, one of the "Big Four" of that season and the result showed the difference in class. Apart from some good work by Burnley goalkeeper Fred Poland the Burnley defence had a nightmare match. Burnley were three down by the half-hour but Burnley got one back before half-time. The second-half continued as a Rovers procession towards Fred Poland' goal and by the end of the match Burnley were well beaten 7–1. McCrae had to wait until February 1889 until he was picked again. He played in the FA Cup 2nd Round tie at Stoney Lane, West Bromwich, then home of West Bromwich Albion. West Brom had a great Cup run that season and reached the semi-finals and they swept Burnley aside 5–1. His final appearance in League football was the last game of the season at County Ground, Derby when again he was on the losing side. McCrae played twice in the League, once at outside right and once at inside-right. Burnley finished 9th in the League and only scored 42 goals. He played one FA Cup tie at outside-right. In 1889 he left Burnley and joined Burnley Union Star.
