= Michael Paton (Dumbarton footballer) =

Scottish footballer

Personal information
- Full name: Michael Paton
- Position: Full back

Senior career*
Years	Team	Apps	(Gls)
1880–1886	Dumbarton		

International career
1883–1886	Scotland	5	(0)
- * Club domestic league appearances and goals

Michael Paton was a Scottish footballer of the 1880s.

== Career ==
Paton played for Dumbarton and Scotland.

== Honours ==
Dumbarton

- Scottish Cup: Winners 1882–83 - Runners Up 1880–81;1881–82
- Dumbartonshire Cup: Winners 1884–85
- Glasgow Charity Cup: Runners Up 1881–82;1884–85
- 5 caps for Scotland between 1882 and 1886
- 1 representative cap for Dumbartonshire
- 1 representative cap for Scotch Counties
- 2 international trial matches for Scotland between 1883 and 1885.

== See also ==
- List of Scotland national football team captains
