= 1884–85 in Scottish football =

Football in Scotland
- Season: 1882–83

1884–85 in Scottish football

Scottish Cup winners
- Renton

Scotland national team
- 1885 BHC

The 1884–85 season was the 12th season of competitive football in Scotland. This season saw three further additions to the list of regional competitions with the inaugural playing of the Dumbartonshire Cup, the Linlithgowshire Cup and the Perthshire Cup.

== Honours ==
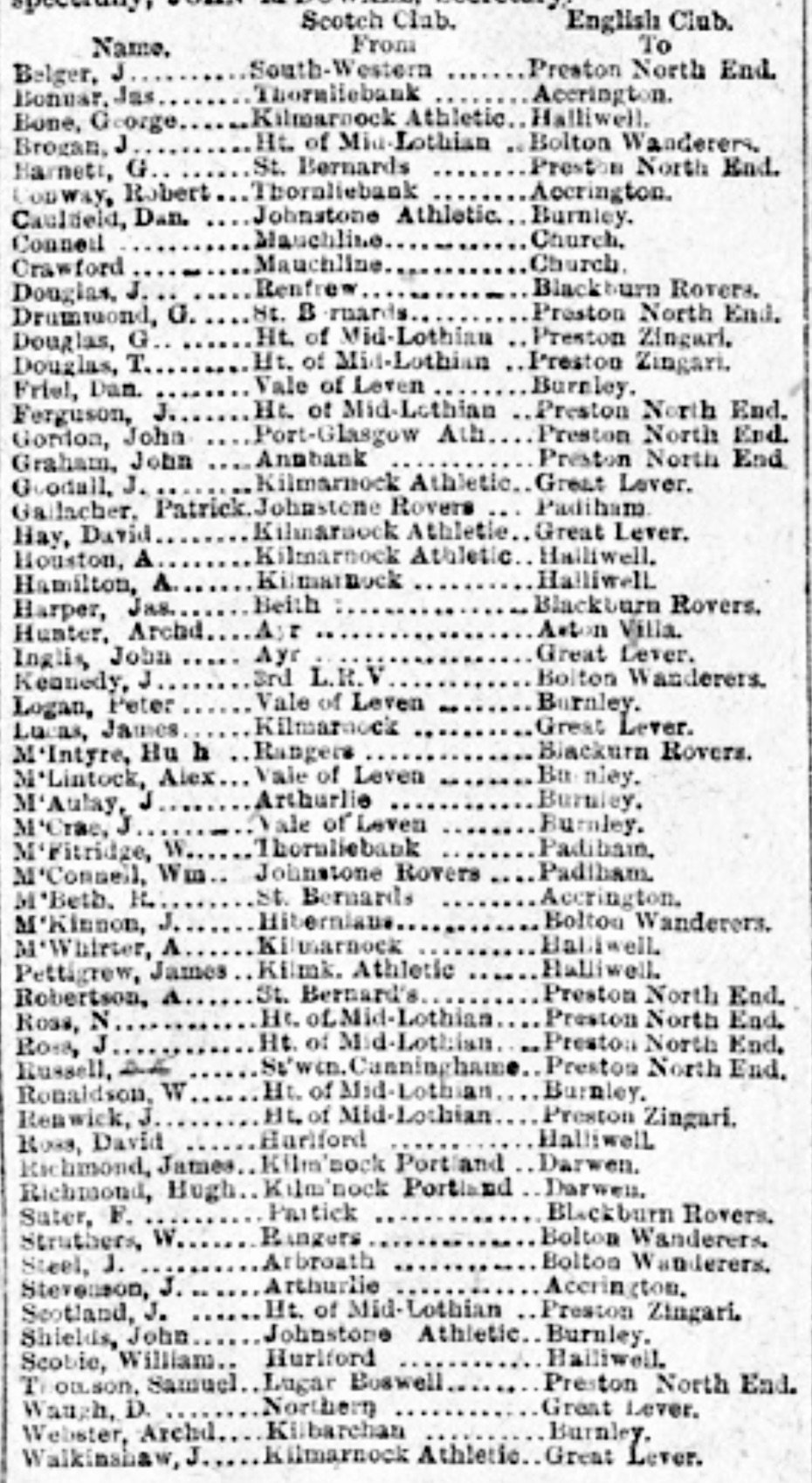
Extract from Scottish FA minutes from 2 December 1884 listing players who had moved to English clubs

=== Cup honours ===
==== National ====
Competition	Winner	Score	Runner-up
Scottish Cup	Renton	3 – 1 (Note: Replay needed.)	Vale of Leven

==== County ====
Competition	Winner	Score	Runner-up
Ayrshire Cup	Kilmarnock	2 – 0	Hurlford
Buteshire Cup	Bute Rangers	1 – 0	Brandanes
Dumbartonshire Cup	Dumbarton	3 – 0	Vale of Leven
East of Scotland Shield	Hibernian	3 – 2	Edinburgh University
Fife Cup	Cowdenbeath	4 – 0	Dunfermline Athletic
Forfarshire Cup	Dundee Harp	15 – 1	Strathmore
Lanarkshire Cup	Cambuslang	5 – 3	West Benhar
Linlithgowshire Cup	Mossend Swifts	3 – 2	Armadale
Perthshire Cup	Dunblane	4 – 3	Vale of Teith
Renfrewshire Cup	Port Glasgow Athletic	2 – 1	Morton
Stirlingshire Cup	Camelon	2 – 1 (Note: Second replay needed.)	Campsie

==== Other ====
Competition	Winner	Score	Runner-up
Glasgow Charity Cup	Queen's Park	1 – 0	Dumbarton

== Scotland national team ==
Date	Venue	Opponents	Score (Note: Scotland's score is shown first.)	Competition	Scotland scorers
14 March 1885	Hampden Park, Glasgow	Ireland	8 – 2	British Home Championship	Alex Higgins (3), Alexander Barbour, W. Lamont, Willie Turner, John Marshall, Robert Calderwood
21 March 1885	Kennington Oval, London	England	1 – 1	British Home Championship	Joseph Lindsay
23 March 1885	Racecourse Ground, Wrexham	Wales	8 – 1	British Home Championship	Joseph Lindsay (3), Robert Calderwood (2), William Anderson (2), David Allan

Pos	Team	Pld	W	D	L	GF	GA	GD	Pts
1	Scotland (C)	3	2	1	0	17	4	+13	5
2	England	3	1	2	0	6	2	+4	4
3	Wales	3	1	1	1	10	11	−1	3
4	Ireland	3	0	0	3	4	20	−16	0

Rules for classification: 1) Points. The points system worked as follows: 2 points for a win and 1 point for a draw.
(C) Champions
