= Robert Brown (footballer, born 1860) =

Scottish footballer

Personal information
- Full name: Robert Brown
- Date of birth: 11 February 1860
- Place of birth: Motherwell, Scotland
- Date of death: 2 December 1940 (aged 80)
- Place of death: Dundee, Scotland
- Positions: Inside forward; half back

Senior career*
Years	Team	Apps	(Gls)
1882–1887	Dumbarton		

International career
1885	Scotland	1	(0)
- * Club domestic league appearances and goals

Robert 'Plumber' Brown (2 February 1860 – 2 December 1940) was a Scottish footballer.

== Career ==
Brown was one of two contemporary players of the same name who both played for Dumbarton and Scotland. To distinguish them, they were given nicknames 'Plumber' and 'Sparrow'.

== Honours ==
Dumbarton

- Scottish Cup: Winners 1882–83
  - Runners Up 1886–87
- Dumbartonshire Cup: Winners 1884–85
- Glasgow Charity Cup: Runners Up 1884–85
- 4 representative caps for Dumbartonshire
- 1 representative cap for Scotch Counties.
