= Joseph Lindsay =

Scottish footballer

Personal information
- Date of birth: 13 November 1858
- Place of birth: Dumbarton, Scotland
- Date of death: 12 October 1933 (aged 74)
- Place of death: Renton, Scotland

Senior career*
Years	Team	Apps	(Gls)
1877–1887	Dumbarton		
1888–1889	Dumbarton Athletic		
1889–1890	Dumbarton		
1891–1893	Renton	11	(2)

International career
1880–1886	Scotland	8	(6)
- * Club domestic league appearances and goals

Joseph Lindsay (13 November 1858 – 12 October 1933) was a Scottish footballer.

== Career ==
Lindsay played for Dumbarton, Rangers, Renton and the Scotland national team.

== Honours ==
Dumbarton

- Scottish Cup: Winners 1882–83 – Runners Up 1880–81;1881–82
- Dumbartonshire Cup: Winners 1884–85
- Glasgow Charity Cup: Runners Up 1881–82;1884–85
- 8 caps for Scotland between 1880 and 1886, scoring 6 goals
- 7 representative caps between 1881 and 1890 (4 for Dumbartonshire – and 3 for Scotch Counties, scoring 2 goals)
- 9 international trial matches for Scotland between 1878 and 1886.

== International goals ==
Scores and results list Scotland's goal tally first.

#	Date	Venue	Opponent	Score	Result	Competition
1	27 March 1880	Hampden Park [I], Glasgow	Wales	3–0	5–1	Friendly
2	29 March 1884	Cathkin Park [I], Glasgow	Wales	1–1	4–1	BHC
3	21 March 1885	Kennington Oval, London	England	1–0	1–1	BHC
4	23 March 1885	Acton Park, Wrexham	Wales	4–1	8–1	BHC
5	23 March 1885	Acton Park, Wrexham	Wales	7–1	8–1	BHC
6	23 March 1885	Acton Park, Wrexham	Wales	8–1	8–1	BHC

== See also ==
- List of Scotland national football team hat-tricks
