= Dumbarton F.C. =

Association football club in Scotland

Dumbarton
- Full name: Dumbarton Football Club
- Nickname: The Sons
- Founded: 23 December 1872; 153 years ago
- Ground: The Rock, Dumbarton
- Capacity: 2,020
- Coordinates: 55.938409°N 4.561632°W
- Owner: Mario Lapointe
- Chairman: John Steele
- Head coach: Martin Fellowes
- League: Scottish League Two
- 2025–26: Scottish League Two, 9th of 10
- Website: www.dumbartonfootballclub.com
Home colours	Away colours	Third colours

Dumbarton Football Club (nicknamed The Sons) is a semi-professional football club in Dumbarton, Scotland. Founded on 23 December 1872, they are one of the oldest football clubs in Scotland. Since December 2000, the club has played home games at The Rock next to Dumbarton Castle. A member of the SPFL, they currently compete in Scottish League Two, the fourth tier of Scottish football.

== History ==
They were one of the most successful of the nineteenth century, winning the Scottish Football League in the first two seasons of the competition (the first jointly with Rangers).

The club ceased playing in 1901 and did not return to action until 1905. Although at the time it was emphasised that this was a new club, subsequent directives by the SFA and Scottish Combination appear to countermand this, possibly to fast-track the re-formed club into their competitions.

Since then, the club have spent the majority of their history outside the top flight, with their last appearance at the top level coming in 1984–85. The club were the first team (and one of only two) to win at least one league title in each of the top four tiers in the Scottish football league system.

In May 2021, when Stephen Farrell was appointed as the club's manager, it was announced that Dumbarton were to change ownership, with previous owners Brabco selling their majority share to Cognitive Capital. In November 2024 the club was placed into administration.

On 24 June 2025 the club was taken over by a new company wholly owned by Canadian businessman Mario Lapointe, with the original company entering liquidation. Dumbarton remained in League Two with the remaining 5 point deduction as already planned.

The club is managed by Martin Fellowes, who was appointed in November 2026. On his appointment Fellowes became the youngest manager in Scottish Professional Football League history at the age of 28.

== Colours and badge ==
For 2026–27, the side will wear strips from the VSN brand for the first time. The home strip is mainly white with a black and gold band while the away strip is all gold with black pinstripes. In October 2026 an all-black third kit with a gold and white tartan stripe on the left hand side was released.

The club's badge features an elephant with a castle on its back, this represents Dumbarton Rock with Dumbarton Castle upon it, based on the historic town crest. Dumbarton Rock, a volcanic plug, is said to resemble an elephant.

In 2000, to coincide with the club moving from Boghead to The Rock, the club redesigned its badge. In May 2026 the badge was updated from yellow to "old gold" to reflect the traditional colours of the club.

The team's nickname 'The Sons' is derived from the phrase 'Sons of The Rock', a term used for those born in the town of Dumbarton.

== Stadium ==
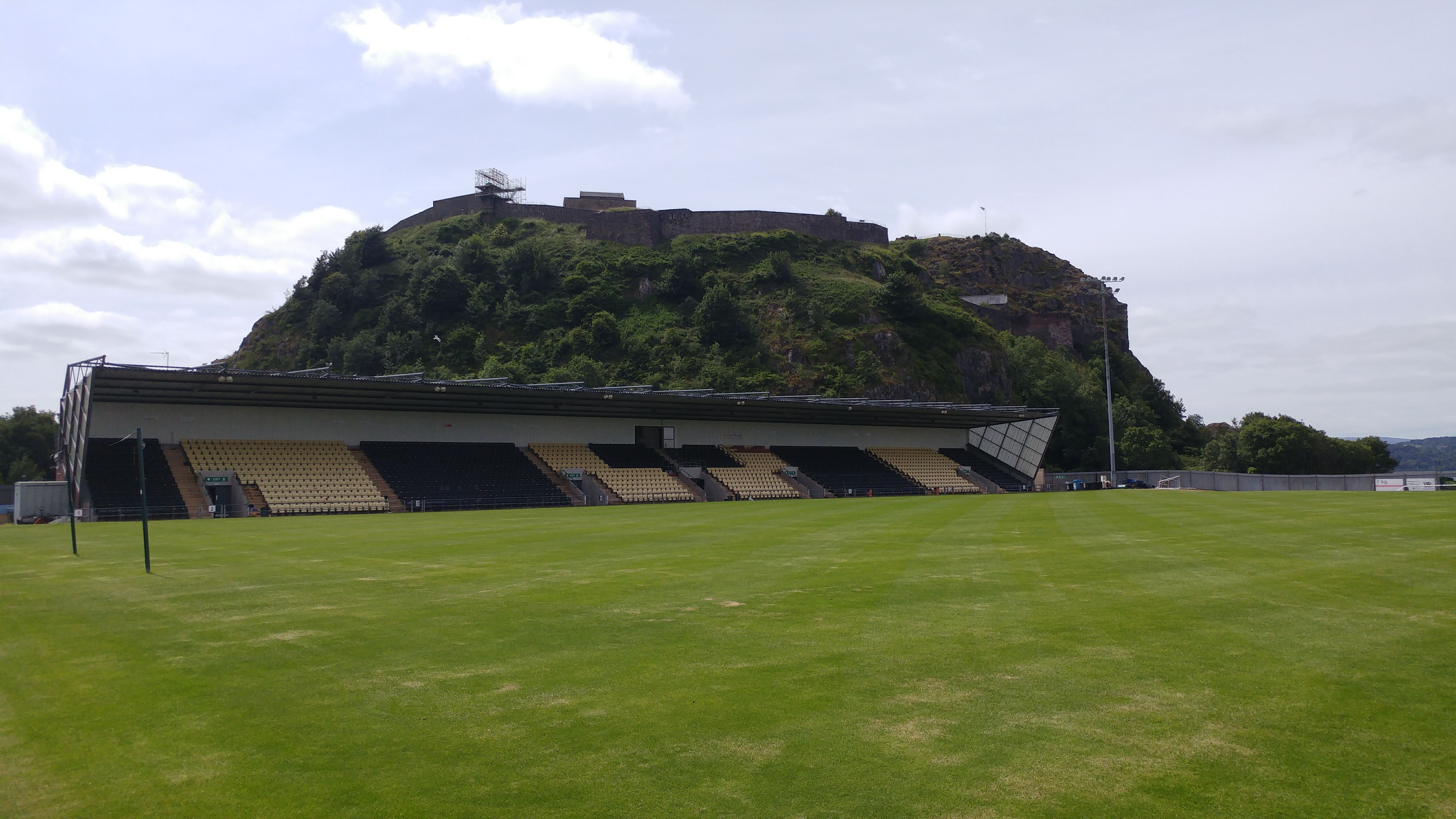
View of the stand at The Rock.

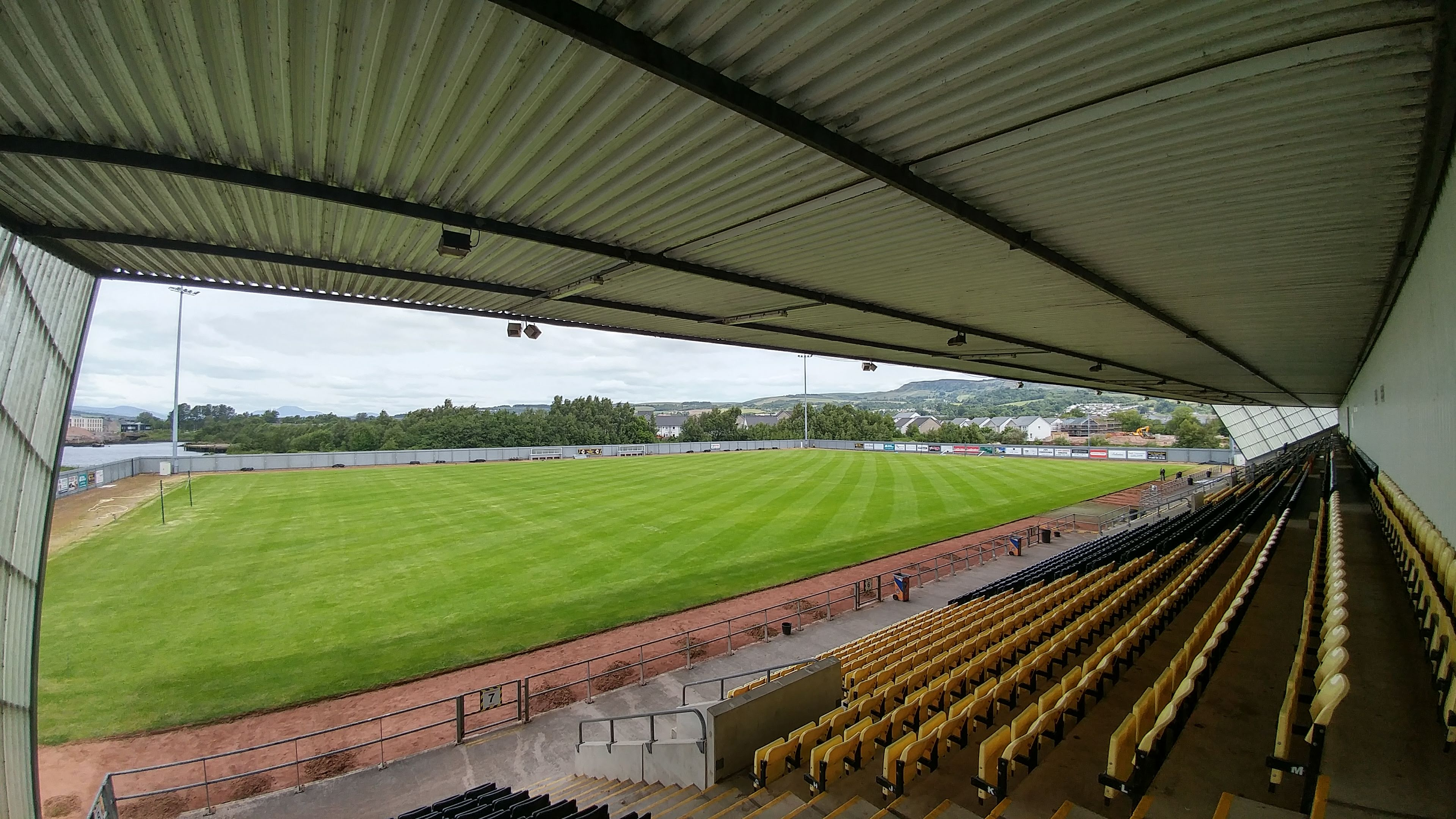
View from the stand at The Rock.

Dumbarton play their home games at The Rock. The 2,020 all seated stadium has been used since 2 December 2000. The only stand is overshadowed by Dumbarton Rock & sits aside the banks of the River Leven. The stadium has been named for sponsorship purposes for most of its existence:

- Strathclyde Homes Stadium (Dec 2000 – Sep 2011) until the receivership of Strathclyde Homes
- Dumbarton Football Stadium (Sep 2011 – Feb 2012)
- Dumbarton Football Stadium Sponsored by DL Cameron (Feb 2012 – Jul 2012)
- The BetButler Stadium (Jul 2012 – Sep 2014) until the liquidation of BetButler
- Dumbarton Football Stadium (Sep 2014 – Jun 2015)
- The Cheaper Insurance Direct Stadium (Jul 2015 – May 2017)
- The YOUR Radio 103FM Stadium (July 2017 – May 2018)
- C&G Systems Stadium (May 2018 – May 2021)
- Dumbarton Football Stadium (May 2021 – September 2021)
- Moreroom.com Stadium (September 2021 – May 2023)
- Dumbarton Football Stadium (May 2023 – July 2024)
- Marbill Coaches Stadium (July 2024 – April 2026)
- The Rock sponsored by Marbill Coaches (April 2026 – present)

Prior to December 2000, the team played at Boghead Park from 1879 until the end of the 1999–00 season; at that time their tenure of 121 years was the longest a senior Scottish club had stayed at the same ground. Between May and November 2000, Dumbarton shared Cliftonhill in Coatbridge with Albion Rovers.

In November 2014 the club's owners at the time, Brabco, formally announced their intention to move to a new ground after only 15 years at their home, situated in what is Young's Farm to the North of Dumbarton between Dalreoch and Renton. The proposed development would have doubled the existing capacity to 4,000, with the existing site being used to build 180 houses and a walkway along the River Clyde connecting the town centre with Dumbarton Castle. The plans were rejected by West Dunbartonshire Council in March 2018.

In April 2026 the club announced the stadium would be renamed from Dumbarton Football Stadium to The Rock, the name that had always been used by supporters. For sponsorship reasons this would be formatted as 'The Rock sponsored by Marbill Coaches'.

=== Attendances ===
Season	League	Average	Highest
2025–26	League Two	701	1,054
2024–25	League One	606	1,113
2023–24	League Two	662	2,020
2022–23	League Two	635	1,086
2021–22	League One	539	1,198
2019–20	League One	663	1,394
2018–19	League One	637	1,353
2017–18	Championship	838	1,652
2016–17	Championship	1,130	1,660
2015–16	Championship	1,033	1,978
2014–15	Championship	1,074	1,850
2013–14	Championship	938	1,469
2012–13	First Division	927	1,530
2011–12	Second Division	660	1,088
2010–11	Second Division	640	853
2009–10	Second Division	695	1,227
2008–09	Third Division	722	1,396
2007–08	Third Division	560	907
2006–07	Third Division	709	1,089
2005–06	Second Division	946	1,594
2004–05	Second Division	900	1,446
2003–04	Second Division	1,039	1,861

== Supporters and culture ==
Dumbarton were the first league club in Scotland to have a supporters' trust, which works to strengthen the links between the club and the fans. The trust owned a significant number of shares in the club and were the fourth largest shareholder prior to Mario Lapointe's takeover in 2025.

The supporters' trust works with the club to produce the match programme and run buses to away matches.

== Players ==
=== Squad ===
As of 23 October 2026

Note: Flags indicate national team as defined under FIFA eligibility rules; some limited exceptions apply. Players may hold more than one non-FIFA nationality.

No.	Pos.	Nation	Player
1	GK	SCO	Aidan Rice (co-operation loan with Celtic)
3	DF	SOM	Ali Omar
4	DF	SCO	Kristian Webster
5	DF	SCO	Tom Lang
6	MF	SCO	Owen Hartington (co-operation loan with Celtic)
7	MF	SCO	Scott Tomlinson
8	MF	ENG	Josh Todd (vice-captain)
9	FW	SCO	Deryn Lang
10	MF	SCO	David Craig
11	MF	CAN	Josiah Sowa (on loan from Queen's Park)
14	MF	SCO	Tony Wallace
15	FW	SCO	Leighton McIntosh

No.	Pos.	Nation	Player
17	MF	SCO	Ally Spalding
18	DF	SCO	Connor Campbell
19	DF	SCO	Chris McKenna (on loan from East Kilbride)
20	FW	CAN	Robbie Cleary
21	MF	SCO	Scott Honeyman
22	MF	NIR	Francis Turley (on loan from Celtic)
24	DF	SCO	Michael Doyle (captain)
27	MF	SCO	Kai Kirkpatrick
28	GK	SCO	Jack McConnell
34	DF	ENG	Thomas Robson
54	GK	NIR	Mason Munn (on loan from Rangers)

=== On loan ===
Note: Flags indicate national team as defined under FIFA eligibility rules; some limited exceptions apply. Players may hold more than one non-FIFA nationality.

No.	Pos.	Nation	Player
–	GK	ENG	Jamie Meikle (on loan at Fauldhouse United)
–	GK	SCO	Luke Smallwood (on loan at St Patrick’s FP FC)
–	DF	SCO	Jon Dunbar (on loan at Vale of Clyde)
–	DF	SCO	Derin Marshall (on loan at Shotts Bon Accord)

No.	Pos.	Nation	Player
–	DF	SCO	Brandon Muir (on loan at Dalbeattie Star)
–	MF	SCO	Aedan Gilfedder (on loan at Renfrew)
–	MF	AUS	Taylor-Phoenix Wright (on loan at Saltire City)

== Hall of Fame ==
The club has a hall of fame plaque in the stadium displaying prominent players and teams from the clubs history.

Individuals

- Peter Miller – 62 apps (1875–1884 & 1885–1888)
- Joseph Lindsay – 46 apps (1877–1890)
- Michael Paton – 16 apps (1880–1886)
- James McAulay – 35 apps (1880–1887)
- Leitch Keir – 49 apps (1881–1897)
- Tom McMillan – 110 apps (1885–1895)
- John Bell – 50 apps (1888-1893)
- Donald Colman – 55 apps (1920–1925) and (1922–1931) as manager
- Joshua Wilkinson – 16 apps (1921)
- Johnny Haddow – 102 apps (1928–1931) & 71 apps (1933–1936)
- John Hosie
- Hugh Gallagher – 191 apps (1954–1962)
- Tommy Govan – 249 apps (1957–1967)
- Andy Jardine – 298 apps (1957–1967)
- Roy McCormack – 246 apps (1966–1976)
- Johnny Graham – 385 apps (1967–1977)
- Jackie Stewart – 190 apps (1968–1973) as manager
- Lawrie Williams – 372 apps (1970–1980)
- Kenny Wilson – 74 apps (1970–1972)
- Alex Wright – 192 apps (1973–1977) as manager
- John Bourke – 111 apps (1973–1978) & 106 apps (1982–1987)
- Donald McNeil – 276 apps (1975–1981)
- Joe Coyle – 130 apps (1970–1982) & 75 apps (1983–1985)
- Tommy Coyle – 286 apps (1978–1987)
- Owen Coyle – 103 apps (1985–1988)
- Tom Carson – 149 apps (1979–1984), 6 apps (1997–1992) & 67 apps (2000–2002) as manager
- Charlie Gibson – 257 apps (1989–1996)
- Craig Brittain – 295 apps (1997–2009)
- Paddy Flannery – 175 apps (1997–2003)
- Stephen Grindlay – 174 apps (2001–2007) & 93 apps (2010–2015)
- Murdo MacLeod – 87 apps (1975–1978) and 66 apps (1993–1995) as player–manager

Teams

- 1882–83 Scottish Cup Winners
- 1890–91 Scottish League Champions (Tier 1)
- 1891–92 Scottish League Champions (Tier 1)
- 1910–11 Division Two Champions (Tier 2)
- 1971–72 Division Two Champions (Tier 2)
- 1983–84 Division One Runners Up (Tier 2)
- 1984–85 Premier Division Season (Tier 1)
- 1991–92 Division Two Champions (Tier 3)
- 2008–09 Third Division Champions (Tier 4)

== Internationals ==
18 Dumbarton players were chosen to represent Scotland between 1880 and 1898. The club's international players were as follows:

- Ralph Aitken
- Jack Bell
- Robert 'Sparrow' Brown
- Robert 'Plumber' Brown
- Geordie Dewar
- Leitch Keir
- Archie Lang
- Joseph Lindsay
- James McAulay
- William McKinnon
- John McLeod
- Thomas McMillan
- Peter Miller
- William Robertson
- Duncan Stewart
- Jack Taylor
- William Thomson
- Hugh Wilson

In 2018 midfielder Dimitris Froxylias received a call-up to the Cyprus national football team, making his debut against Montenegro in March 2018. It was the first of two caps he would earn whilst a Sons player, becoming the club's first international since Irishman Harry Chatton in 1932.

In 2026 defender Ali Omar was called-up by the Somalia national football team, becoming the first Sons player to represent an African nation.

== Coaching staff ==
Position	Name
Director of football	Danny Lennon
Head coach	Martin Fellowes
Assistant head coach	Craig Malcolm
Goalkeeping coach	David McGurn
Head of youth development	Craig Sutherland
Club doctor	John Dempster
Head of physiotherapy	Rishabh Upadhyay
Physiotherapy assistant	Jack McEwan
Sports analyst	Fraser Banks
Sports scientist	Callum Strang
Kitman	Drew Walls

== Recent league history ==
Season	P	W	D	L	GF	GA	GD	Pts	Pos	League
2025–26	36	10	10	16	47	61	−14	35*	9	League Two
2024–25	36	8	11	17	51	66	−15	20**	10 (R)	League One
2023–24	36	16	9	11	56	44	12	58	4(P)	League Two
2022–23	36	18	8	10	49	39	10	62	2	League Two
2021–22	36	9	7	20	48	71	−23	34	9(R)	League One
2020–21	22	7	4	11	14	24	−10	25	9	League One
2019–20	28	11	5	12	35	44	−9	38	6	League One
2018–19	36	12	10	14	60	60	0	46	6	League One
2017–18	36	7	9	20	27	63	−36	30	9(R)	Championship
2016–17	36	9	12	15	46	56	−10	39	8	Championship
2015–16	36	10	7	19	35	66	−31	37	8	Championship
2014–15	36	9	7	20	36	79	−43	34	7	Championship

*Deducted 5 points for entering administration the previous season. **Deducted 15 points for entering administration.

== Managerial history ==
Manager records for all league, league play-offs, League Cup, Scottish Cup & Challenge Cup games (i.e. not including friendlies & Stirlingshire Cup games)

- Permanent managers only. Stats include permanent managers who had initial caretaker spells.

As of 18 November 2026:

Name	Nat.	From	To	Record				
Name	Nat.	From	To	Pld	W	D	L	%won
Martin Fellowes	(Scotland)	November 2026	Present	0	0	0	0	0
Frank McKeown	(Scotland)	December 2025	October 2026	43	12	8	23	27.90
Stephen Farrell	(Scotland)	May 2021	November 2025	210	74	48	88	35.24
Jim Duffy	(Scotland)	October 2018	May 2021	94	33	18	43	35.11
Stephen Aitken	(Scotland)	May 2015	October 2018	154	42	38	74	27.27
Ian Murray	(Scotland)	November 2012	May 2015	108	41	15	52	37.96
Alan Adamson	(Scotland)	October 2010	October 2012	83	32	16	35	38.55
Jim Chapman	(Scotland)	December 2007	October 2010	113	39	27	47	34.50
Gerry McCabe	(Scotland)	June 2006	November 2007	57	25	11	21	43.86
Paul Martin	(Scotland)	December 2004	June 2006	67	12	15	35	17.91
Brian Fairley	(Scotland)	March 2003	December 2004	66	30	10	26	45.45
David Winnie	(Scotland)	June 2002	March 2003	34	11	6	17	32.35
Tom Carson	(Scotland)	October 2000	June 2002	67	32	13	22	47.76
Jimmy Brown	(Scotland)	March 1999	October 2000	66	26	10	30	39.39
Ian Wallace	(Scotland)	November 1996	March 1999	95	26	24	45	27.37
Jim Fallon	(Scotland)	September 1995	November 1996	50	2	6	42	4.00
Murdo MacLeod	(Scotland)	June 1993	August 1995	88	28	24	35	31.81
Billy Lamont	(Scotland)	April 1990	June 1993	138	54	30	54	39.13
Jim George	(Scotland)	October 1988	April 1990	77	29	20	28	37.66
Bertie Auld	(Scotland)	January 1988	September 1988	24	4	8	12	16.66
Mark Clougherty	(Scotland)	July 1987	January 1988	30	9	7	14	30.00
Alex Totten	(Scotland)	July 1986	April 1987	46	23	8	15	50.00
Derek Whiteford	(Scotland)	May 1986	May 1986					
Alex Wright (caretaker)	(Scotland)	February 1986	May 1986	17	6	5	6	35.30
Davie Wilson	(Scotland)	March 1984	February 1986	97	32	22	43	33.00
Billy Lamont	(Scotland)	July 1981	February 1984	124	44	26	26	35.48
Sean Fallon	(Republic of Ireland)	July 1980	May 1981	43	14	12	17	32.56
Davie Wilson	(Scotland)	July 1977	April 1980	127	51	38	38	40.16
Alex Wright	(Scotland)	March 1973	May 1977	192	66	42	84	34.37
Jackie Stewart	(Scotland)	November 1968	January 1973	190	89	34	67	46.84
Ian Spence	(Scotland)	September 1967	October 1968	46	13	11	22	28.26
Willie Toner	(Scotland)	October 1964	September 1967	131	47	27	57	35.88
Jackie Fearn	(Scotland)	May 1962	September 1964	100	41	17	42	41.00
Bobby Campbell	(Scotland)	July 1961	May 1962	43	10	10	23	23.26
Bobby Combe	(Scotland)	May 1959	November 1960	63	28	14	21	44.44
Peter McGown	(Scotland)	May 1954	April 1959	216	108	33	75	50.00
William Irvine	(Scotland)	June 1950	May 1954	155	51	32	72	32.90
William Guthrie	(Scotland)	August 1946	June 1950	153	42	27	84	27.45
Jackie Milne	(Scotland)	June 1945	August 1946	38	14	6	18	36.84
William Guthrie (secretary)	(Scotland)	August 1944	June 1945	30	9	3	18	30.00
Fred Donovan (secretary)	(Scotland)	June 1940	June 1944	120	45	20	55	37.50
Jimmy Smith	(Scotland)	January 1939	June 1940	45	9	8	28	20.00
Fred Donovan (secretary)	(Scotland)	June 1931	January 1939	274	98	48	128	35.77
Donald Colman	(Scotland)	June 1922	May 1931	359	139	65	155	38.72
Paddy Travers	(Scotland)	April 1920	May 1922	95	24	17	54	25.27
George Livingstone	(Scotland)	March 1919	April 1920	47	14	12	21	29.79
James Collins	(Scotland)	May 1914	March 1919	174	55	46	73	31.61

== Honours ==
=== League ===
- Scottish Football League: Winners 1890–91, 1891–92
- Scottish First Division: Winners 1910–11, 1971–72
  - Runners-up 1907–08, 1983–84
- Scottish Second Division: Winners 1991–92
  - Runners-up 1994–95
  - Play-Off Winners 2011–12
- Scottish Third Division: Winners 2008–09
  - Runners-up 2001–02, 2022–23
  - Play-Off Winners 2023–24
- Scottish Combination League: Winners 1905–06

=== Cup ===
==== National ====
- Scottish Cup: Winners 1882–83
  - Runners-up 1880–81, 1881–82, 1886–87, 1890–91, 1896–97
- Scottish Challenge Cup: Runners-up 2017–18
- Scottish Qualifying Cup: Runners-up 1911–12
- Scottish Consolation Cup: Runners-up 1907–08, 1910–11
- Scottish Supplementary Cup: Runners-up 1945–46
- Festival of Britain St. Mungo Quaich: Winners 1951–52

==== Other ====
- Stirlingshire Cup: Winners (16) 1952–53, 1956–57, 1964–65, 1972–73, 1974–75, 1980–81, 1982–83, 1985–86, 1987–88, 1989–90, 1990–91, 1993–94, 1995–96, 2009–10, 2010–11, 2012–13
  - Runners-up 6 times
- Dumbartonshire Cup: Winners (20) 1884–85 1888–89, 1889–90, 1890–91, 1891–92, 1892–93, 1893–94, 1894–95, 1897–98, 1898–99, 1914–15, 1921–22, 1922–23, 1929–30, 1930–31, 1931–32, 1932–33, 1935–36, 1936–37, 1939–40
  - Runners-up 17 times
- Dumbartonshire Association Tournament: Winners 1885–86
- Stirlingshire Consolation Cup: Runners-up 1950–51
- League Charity Cup: Winners 1890–91
- Glasgow Charity Cup: Runners-up 1881–82, 1884–85
- Greenock Charity Cup: Winners 1889–90, 1890–91
  - Runners-up 1888–89, 1891–92
- Dumbartonshire Charity Cup:
  - Winners 1916–17, 1917–18, 1919–20, 1921–22, 1922–23
  - Runners-up 1918–19, 1924–25, 1925–26
- Clydebank Charity Cup: Runners-up 1918–19
- United Abstainers F.C. Gold Cup: Runners-up 1889–90
- Oban Saints Keyline Trophy: Winners 2005–06

=== Reserves ===
- Scottish Second XI Cup: Winners 1881–82
  - Runners-up 1882–83, 1883–84, 1886–87, 1889–90
- Glasgow & District Reserve League: Runners-up 1942–43 (First Series), 1943–44 (First Series)
- Scottish Alliance Reserve League: Winners 1956–57 (First Series)
  - Runners-up: 1956–57 (Second Series)
- Combined Reserve League: Winners 1958–59 (Second Series)
  - Runners-up: 1958–59 (First Series)
- Scottish Reserve League (West): Runners-up 1985–86
- Glasgow & District Reserve League Cup: Runners-up 1942–43
- Dumbartonshire Second XI Cup: Winners 1888–89, 1889–90, 1890–91, 1891–92, 1892–93

=== Youths ===
- Scottish Under 19s League: Runners-up 2010–11
- West Region Under 18s Cup: Runners-up 2022–23
- West Region Under 17s Cup: Runners-up 2022–23
- Scottish Lowland Development League: Runners Up 2025–26
- SLDFL Knockout Cup: Winners 2025–26
- SLDFL All-in Challenge Cup: Runners-up 2025–26

== Club records ==
- Biggest win:
  - Scottish Cup: 13–2 v Kirkintilloch Central (1 September 1888)
- Biggest loss:
  - Scottish Football League: 1–11 v Albion Rovers (30 January 1926)
  - Scottish League Cup: 1–11 v Ayr United (13 August 1952)
- Biggest home attendance:
  - Boghead Park: 18,001 v Raith Rovers, (2 March 1957)
  - Dumbarton Football Stadium: 2,020 v Rangers, (20 January 2024)
- Most goals in a season: Kenny Wilson (38), 1971–72
