= List of Dumbarton F.C. seasons =

The following is a list of seasons played by Dumbarton F.C., detailing performances in each of the major Scottish football competitions entered. See the links to the specific seasons for details of other competitions, player data etc.

Season	Pld	W	D	L	GF	GA	GD	Pts	Pos	League	Scottish Cup	League Cup
1873–74	There was no League football until 1890.										2nd round	
1874–75	There was no League football until 1890.										Semi-final	
1875–76	There was no League football until 1890.										Semi-final	
1876–77	There was no League football until 1890.										3rd round	
1877–78	There was no League football until 1890.										2nd round	
1878–79	There was no League football until 1890.										6th Round	
1879–80	There was no League football until 1890.										Semi-final	
1880–81	There was no League football until 1890.										Runners-up	
1881–82	There was no League football until 1890.										Runners-up	
1882–83	There was no League football until 1890.										Winners	
1883–84	There was no League football until 1890.										1st round	
1884–85	There was no League football until 1890.										3rd round	
1885–86	There was no League football until 1890.										5th round	
1886–87	There was no League football until 1890.										Runners-up	
1887–88	There was no League football until 1890.										2nd round	
1888–89	There was no League football until 1890.										Semi-final	
1889–90	There was no League football until 1890.										3rd round	
1890–91	18	13	3	2	61	21	+40	29	1=	League	Runners-up	
1891–92	22	18	1	3	78	27	+51	37	1	League	7th round	
1892–93	18	8	1	9	35	35	0	17	7	League	2nd round	
1893–94	18	7	5	6	32	35	–3	19	5	Division One	2nd round	
1894–95	18	3	1	14	27	58	–31	7	10	Division One	2nd round	
1895–96	18	4	0	14	36	74	–38	8	10	Division One	1st round	
1896–97	18	2	2	14	27	64	–37	6	10	Division Two	Runners-up	
1897–98	did not compete in League football.										1st round	
1898–99	did not compete in League football.										1st round	
1899–1900	did not compete in League football.										DNQ	
1900–01	did not compete in League football.										1st round	
1905–06	19	16	1	2	62	23	+39	31	1	Combination	DNQ	
1906–07	22	11	3	8	52	35	+17	25	4	Division Two	DNQ	
1907–08	22	12	5	5	49	32	+17	27	2	Division Two	DNQ	
1908–09	22	10	5	7	34	34	0	25	4	Division Two	DNQ	
1909–10	22	9	5	8	44	38	+6	23	4	Division Two	1st round	
1910–11	22	15	1	6	52	30	+22	31	1	Division Two	DNQ	
1911–12	22	13	1	8	47	31	+16	27	3	Division Two	1st round	
1912–13	26	12	5	9	38	30	+8	29	6	Division Two	4th round	
1913–14	38	10	7	21	45	87	–42	27	19	Division One	2nd round	
1914–15	38	13	8	17	51	66	–15	34	13	Division One		
1915–16	38	13	11	14	54	64	–10	37	9	League		
1916–17	38	12	11	15	56	73	–17	35	10	League		
1917–18	34	13	8	13	48	49	–1	34	8	League		
1918–19	34	7	8	19	31	58	–27	22	15	League		
1919–20	42	13	13	16	57	65	–8	39	11	League	1st round	
1920–21	42	10	4	28	41	89	–48	24	21	League	4th round	
1921–22	42	10	10	22	46	81	–35	30	20	Division One	1st round	
1922–23	38	17	8	13	61	40	+21	42	4	Division Two	1st round	
1923–24	38	17	5	16	55	56	–1	39	10	Division Two	1st round	
1924–25	38	15	10	13	45	44	+1	40	8	Division Two	2nd round	
1925–26	38	14	10	14	54	78	–24	38	11	Division Two	4th round	
1926–27	38	13	6	19	69	84	–15	32	18	Division Two	2nd round	
1927–28	38	16	4	18	66	72	–6	36	11	Division Two	1st round	
1928–29	36	11	9	16	59	78	–19	31	14	Division Two	3rd round	
1929–30	38	14	2	22	77	95	–18	30	16	Division Two	1st round	
1930–31	38	15	8	15	73	72	+1	38	10	Division Two	1st round	
1931–32	38	14	10	14	70	68	+2	38	12	Division Two	1st round	
1932–33	34	14	6	14	69	67	+2	34	9	Division Two	2nd round	
1933–34	34	17	3	14	67	68	–1	37	6	Division Two	1st round	
1934–35	34	9	4	21	60	105	–45	22	16	Division Two	2nd round	
1935–36	34	5	6	23	52	121	–69	16	18	Division Two	3rd round	
1936–37	34	11	5	18	57	83	–26	27	15	Division Two	2nd round	
1937–38	34	17	5	12	85	66	+19	39	7	Division Two	1st round	
1938–39	34	9	12	13	68	76	–8	30	11	Division Two	1st round	
1939–40	30	7	4	19	48	78	–30	18	16	Western Division		
1940–41	30	10	4	16	58	78	–20	24	14	Southern League		
1941–42	30	11	4	15	73	90	–17	26	12	Southern League		
1942–43	30	11	6	13	76	76	0	28	10	Southern League		
1943–44	30	13	6	11	54	58	–4	32	5	Southern League		
1944–45	30	9	3	18	51	84	–33	21	13	Southern League		
1945–46	26	11	4	11	59	54	+5	26	8	Division B		
1946–47	26	7	4	15	41	54	–13	18	13	Division B	4th round	1st round
1947–48	30	9	7	14	66	79	–13	25	11	Division B	3rd round	1st round
1948–49	30	8	6	16	52	79	–27	22	15	Division B	3rd round	1st round
1949–50	30	6	4	20	39	62	–23	16	15	Division B	2nd round	1st round
1950–51	30	12	5	13	52	53	–1	29	9	Division B	1st round	1st round
1951–52	30	10	8	12	51	57	–6	28	10	Division B	3rd round	1st round
1952–53	30	11	6	13	58	67	–9	28	10	Division B	1st round	1st round
1953–54	30	7	8	15	51	92	–41	22	16	Division B	1st round	1st round
1954–55	24	12	6	6	58	46	+12	30	4	Division C	3rd round	
1955–56	36	21	5	10	83	62	+21	47	4	Division Two	4th round	Quarter-final
1956–57	36	17	4	15	101	70	+31	38	9	Division Two	7th round	1st round
1957–58	36	20	4	12	92	57	+35	44	4	Division Two	1st round	1st round
1958–59	36	19	7	10	94	61	+33	45	4	Division Two	2nd round	1st round
1959–60	36	18	7	11	67	53	+14	43	6	Division Two	1st round	1st round
1960–61	36	15	5	16	78	82	–4	35	10	Division Two	2nd round	Quarter-final
1961–62	36	9	10	17	49	66	–17	28	17	Division Two	2nd round	1st round
1962–63	36	15	4	17	64	64	0	34	12	Division Two	1st round	Quarter-final
1963–64	36	16	6	14	67	59	+8	38	6	Division Two	2nd round	1st round
1964–65	36	13	6	17	55	67	–12	32	14	Division Two	1st round	1st round
1965–66	36	14	7	15	63	61	+2	35	12	Division Two	3rd round	1st round
1966–67	38	12	9	17	56	64	–8	33	14	Division Two	1st round	1st round
1967–68	36	11	11	14	63	74	–11	33	10	Division Two	1st Prelim	1st round
1968–69	36	11	5	20	46	69	–23	27	14	Division Two	1st round	1st round
1969–70	36	17	6	13	55	46	+9	40	7	Division Two	1st round	Quarter-final
1970–71	36	19	6	11	87	46	+41	44	4	Division Two	2nd round	Semi-final
1971–72	36	24	4	8	89	51	+38	52	1	Division Two	4th round	1st round
1972–73	34	6	11	17	43	72	–29	23	16	Division One	4th round	2nd round
1973–74	34	11	7	16	43	58	–15	29	10	Division One	3rd round	2nd round
1974–75	34	7	10	17	44	55	–11	24	14	Division One	5th round	1st round
1975–76	26	12	4	10	53	46	+7	28	4	First Division	Semi-final	1st round
1976–77	39	14	9	16	63	68	–5	37	7	First Division	3rd round	1st round
1977–78	39	16	17	6	65	48	+17	49	4	First Division	5th round	2nd round
1978–79	39	14	11	14	58	50	+8	39	7	First Division	5th round	1st round
1979–80	39	19	6	14	59	51	+8	44	4	First Division	3rd round	1st round
1980–81	39	13	11	15	49	50	–1	37	8	First Division	4th round	2nd round
1981–82	39	13	9	17	49	61	–12	35	11	First Division	4th round	1st round
1982–83	39	13	10	16	50	59	–9	36	7	First Division	3rd round	1st round
1983–84	39	20	11	8	66	44	+22	51	2	First Division	4th round	2nd round
1984–85	36	6	7	23	29	64	–35	19	9	Premier Division	3rd round	3rd round
1985–86	39	16	11	12	59	52	+7	43	6	First Division	3rd round	2nd round
1986–87	44	23	7	14	67	52	+16	53	3	First Division	3rd round	2nd round
1987–88	44	12	12	20	51	70	–19	36	12	First Division	3rd round	2nd round
1988–89	39	12	10	17	45	55	–10	34	12	Second Division	3rd round	2nd round
1989–90	39	15	10	14	70	73	–3	40	6	Second Division	2nd round	2nd round
1990–91	39	15	10	14	50	49	+1	40	7	Second Division	1st round	1st round
1991–92	39	20	12	7	65	37	+28	52	1	Second Division	3rd round	2nd round
1992–93	44	15	7	22	56	71	-15	37	9	First Division	3rd round	2nd round
1993–94	44	11	14	19	48	59	–11	36	8	First Division	3rd round	2nd round
1994–95	36	17	9	10	57	35	+22	60	2	Second Division	1st round	2nd round
1995–96	36	3	2	31	23	94	–71	11	10	First Division	2nd round	2nd round
1996–97	36	9	8	19	44	66	–22	35	9	Second Division	2nd round	2nd round
1997–98	36	7	10	19	42	61	–19	31	10	Third Division	3rd round	2nd round
1998–99	36	16	9	11	53	40	+13	57	4	Third Division	1st round	1st round
1999–2000	36	15	8	13	53	51	+2	53	6	Third Division	2nd round	2nd round
2000–01	36	13	6	17	46	49	–3	45	6	Third Division	2nd round	2nd round
2001–02	36	18	7	11	59	48	+11	61	2	Third Division	1st round	2nd round
2002–03	36	13	9	14	48	47	+1	48	6	Second Division	1st round	1st round
2003–04	36	18	6	12	56	41	+15	60	3	Second Division	1st round	2nd round
2004–05	36	11	9	16	43	53	–10	42	7	Second Division	2nd round	1st round
2005–06	36	7	5	24	40	63	–23	26	10	Second Division	2nd round	1st round
2006–07	36	18	5	13	52	37	+15	52	5	Third Division	3rd round	2nd round
2007–08	36	9	10	17	31	38	–17	37	8	Third Division	4th round	1st round
2008–09	36	19	10	7	65	36	+29	67	1	Third Division	3rd round	2nd round
2009–10	36	14	6	16	49	58	–9	48	6	Second Division	3rd round	1st round
2010–11	36	11	7	18	52	70	–18	40	7	Second Division	3rd round	1st round
2011–12	36	17	7	12	61	61	0	58	3	Second Division	3rd round	1st round
2012–13	36	13	4	19	58	83	−25	43	7	First Division	4th round	2nd round
2013–14	36	15	6	15	64	64	0	51	5	Championship	6th round	2nd round
2014–15	36	9	7	20	36	79	-43	34	7	Championship	3rd round	2nd round
2015–16	36	10	7	19	35	66	-31	37	8	Championship	5th round	1st round
2016–17	36	9	12	15	46	56	-10	39	8	Championship	3rd round	1st round
2017–18	36	7	9	20	27	63	-36	30	9	Championship	5th round	1st round
2018–19	36	12	10	14	60	60	0	46	6	League One	3rd round	1st round
2019–20	28	11	5	12	35	44	-9	38	6	League One	4th round	1st round
2020–21	22	7	4	11	14	24	−10	25	9	League One	3rd round	1st round
2021–22	36	9	7	20	48	71	-23	34	9	League One	3rd round	1st round
2022–23	36	18	8	10	49	39	10	62	2	League Two	4th round	1st round
2023–24	36	16	9	11	56	44	12	57	4	League Two	4th round	1st round
2024–25	36	8	11	17	51	66	–15	20 (Note: Dumbarton were deducted 15 points for entering administration.)	10	League One	4th round	1st round
2025–26	36	10	10	16	47	61	–5	35 (Note: Dumbarton were deducted 5 points for entering administration in the previous season.)	9	League Two	3rd round	1st round
