= 1878–79 Dumbarton F.C. season =

Dumbarton
1878–79 season
- Stadium: Townend, Dumbarton
- Scottish Cup: Sixth Round
Home colours

The 1878–79 season was the sixth Scottish football season in which Dumbarton competed at a national level.

== Scottish Cup ==
Dumbarton reached the sixth round of the Scottish Cup before losing out to their local rivals, Vale of Leven - who went on to retain the cup for the third successive year.

| 28 September 1878 Cup R1 | Dumbarton | 8–1 | 10th Dumbarton RV | Dumbarton |
| | Goal | | Goal |

| 19 October 1878 Cup R2 | Renton | 1–6 | Dumbarton | Renton |
| | Goal | | McMaster; Grant; Galbraith; Lawrence (OG) (OG) | Attendance: 4,000 |

| 9 November 1878 Cup R3 | Dumbarton | 5–0 | Strathblane | Dumbarton |
| | Goal |

| 30 November 1878 Cup R4 | Portland (Kilmarnock) | 1–1 | Dumbarton | Kilmarnock |
| | Goal | | Goal |

| 7 December 1878 Cup R4r | Dumbarton | 6–1 | Portland (Kilmarnock) | Dumbarton |
| | 20' | | Goal |

| 8 March 1879 Cup R5 | Dumbarton | 9–1 | Stonelaw | Dumbarton |
| | Goal | | Goal |

| 22 March 1879 Cup QF | Vale of Leven | 3–1 | Dumbarton | Alexandria |
| | McDougall | | Lindsay 10' | Attendance: 6,000 |

== Friendlies ==
During the season, 10 'friendly' matches were played, including home and away fixtures against local rivals Renton, and a home game against the holders of the Ayrshire Cup, Mauchline. Of these matches, 8 were won and 2 drawn, scoring 36 goals and conceding 7.

| 31 August 1878 Friendly | Arthurlie | 0–4 | Dumbarton | Barrhead |
| | | | Goal |

| 7 September 1878 Friendly | Dumbarton | 3–3 | Mauchline | Dumbarton |
| | (OG) | | Tannock 30' |

| 5 October 1878 Friendly | Renton | 1–2 | Dumbarton | Renton |
| | Goal | | Goal |

| 26 October 1878 Friendly | Alexandria | 0–8 | Dumbarton | Alexandria |
| | | | Goal |

| 2 November 1878 Friendly | Dumbarton | 5–0 | Jamestown | Dumbarton |
| | Goal |

| 16 November 1878 Friendly | Dumbarton | 3–1 | Renton | Dumbarton |
| | Goal | | Goal |

| 23 November 1878 Friendly | Dumbarton | 3–0 | Helensburgh | Dumbarton |
| | Carruthers; McMaster |

| 8 February 1879 Friendly | Govan | 1–1 | Dumbarton | Moorepark, Govan |
| | Goal | | Goal |

| 5 April 1879 Friendly | Parkgrove | 1–2 | Dumbarton | Glasgow |
| | Goal | | Goal |

| 12 April 1879 Friendly | Dumbarton | 5–0 | Lennox | Dumbarton |
| | Goal |

== Player statistics ==
Of note amongst those donning the club's colours for the first time was Robert 'Sparrow' Brown.

Only includes appearances and goals in competitive Scottish Cup matches.

| Player | Position | Appearances | Goals |
|---|---|---|---|
| (Scotland) John Kennedy | GK | 7 | 0 |
| (Scotland) Jock Hutcheson | DF | 7 | 0 |
| (Scotland) Archie Lang | DF | 7 | 0 |
| (Scotland) J Anderson | MF | 7 | 0 |
| (Scotland) Peter Miller | MF | 7 | 0 |
| (Scotland) Robert Brown | FW | 2 | 0 |
| (Scotland) J Carruthers | FW | 6 | 0 |
| (Scotland) Alex Galbraith | FW | 6 | 1 |
| (Scotland) Grant | FW | 2 | 1 |
| (Scotland) David Hartley | FW | 5 | 0 |
| (Scotland) Alex Lawrence | FW | 5 | 1 |
| (Scotland) Joe Lindsay | FW | 6 | 1 |
| (Scotland) William McKinnon | FW | 7 | 0 |
| (Scotland) J McMaster | FW | 1 | 1 |
| (Scotland) R Miller | FW | 2 | 0 |
