= 1877–78 Dumbarton F.C. season =

Dumbarton
1877–78 season
- Stadium: Townend, Dumbarton
- Scottish Cup: Second Round
Home colours

The 1877–78 season was the fifth Scottish football season in which Dumbarton competed at a national level.

== Scottish Cup ==
During the early years of the Scottish Cup, the earlier rounds of the competition were played on a regional basis, which was always a tough proposition as three of the top Scottish clubs at the time were from Dumbartonshire. This season Dumbarton came up against Vale of Leven in the second round, and lost (to the eventual champions) after a 1–1 draw.

| 29 September 1877 Cup R1 | Dumbarton | 4–0 | Waverley | Dumbarton |
| | Lawrence; McMaster; Anderson |

| 20 October 1877 Cup R2 | Dumbarton | 1–1 | Vale of Leven | Dumbarton |
| | Goal | | Baird | Attendance: 3,000 |

| 27 October 1877 Cup R2r | Vale of Leven | 4–1 | Dumbarton | Alexandria |
| | Paton | | Meikleham | Attendance: 5,000 |

== Friendlies ==
During the season, 12 'friendly' matches were played, including home and away fixtures against local teams Renton and Alexandria, and also Glasgow sides, Rangers and South Western. Of these matches, 8 were won, 1 drawn and 3 lost, scoring 32 goals and conceding 8.

| 1 September 1877 Friendly | Dumbarton | 2–1 | Renton | Dumbarton |
| | Goal | | Goal |

| 15 September 1877 Friendly | South Western | 1–2 | Dumbarton | Govan |
| | Goal | | Meikleham | Referee: Mr Woodrufer |

| 24 November 1877 Friendly | Rangers | 1–0 | Dumbarton | Kinning Park |
| | Marshall |

| 1 December 1877 Friendly | Dumbarton | 9–0 | Lancefield | Dumbarton |
| | Goal |

| 15 December 1877 Friendly | Mauchline | 1–0 | Dumbarton | Mauchline |
| | 15' |

| 22 December 1877 Friendly | Renton | 1–1 | Dumbarton | Tontine Park |
| | Goal | | Goal |

| 2 March 1878 Friendly | Alexandria | 0–3 | Dumbarton | Alexandria |
| | | | Goal |

| 16 March 1878 Friendly | Dumbarton | 6–0 | Alexandria | Dumbarton |
| | Goal |

| 23 March 1878 Friendly | Dumbarton | 2–1 | Rangers | Dumbarton |
| | Goal | | Goal |

| 30 March 1878 Friendly | Dumbarton | 1–2 | South Western | Dumbarton |
| | Galbraith | | Goal |

| 13 April 1878 Friendly | Dumbarton | 4–0 | Renton | Dumbarton |
| | Goal |

| 20 April 1878 Friendly | Dumbarton | 2–0 | Lennox F.C. (Scotland) | Dumbarton |
| | Goal |

== Player statistics ==
Of note amongst those appearing in club colours for the first time this season were Joe Lindsay, Jock Hutcheson and William McKinnon.

Only includes appearances and goals in competitive Scottish Cup matches.

| Player | Position | Appearances | Goals |
|---|---|---|---|
| (Scotland) John Kennedy | GK | 3 | 0 |
| (Scotland) Jock Hutcheson | DF | 2 | 0 |
| (Scotland) Andrew Kennedy | DF | 1 | 0 |
| (Scotland) Archie Lang | DF | 3 | 0 |
| (Scotland) James Boyd | MF | 3 | 0 |
| (Scotland) Peter Miller | MF | 3 | 0 |
| (Scotland) William Anderson | FW | 3 | 1 |
| (Scotland) Alex Galbraith | FW | 2 | 0 |
| (Scotland) David Hartley | FW | 3 | 1 |
| (Scotland) Alex Lawrence | FW | 3 | 2 |
| (Scotland) William McKinnon | FW | 1 | 0 |
| (Scotland) J McMaster | FW | 3 | 1 |
| (Scotland) James Meikleham | FW | 3 | 0 |

=== International trial ===
In order to select a 'Scotland' team to play against England, an international trial match was held for Dunbartonshire players on 9 February 1878 at Alexandria. Archie Lang, Peter Miller, Alex Galbraith, Joe Lindsay and J McMaster all played. A month later on 9 March a second trial match was held at Ibrox to consider selection for the team to play against Wales, with Peter Miller and Alex Galbraith playing. In the end however, none of the Dumbarton men were capped.
