= 1881–82 Dumbarton F.C. season =

Dumbarton
1881–82 season
- Stadium: Boghead Park, Dumbarton
- Scottish Cup: Runners Up
Home colours

The 1881–82 season was the ninth Scottish football season in which Dumbarton competed at a national level.

== Scottish Cup ==
Dumbarton reached the final of the Scottish Cup for the second consecutive season. During the early years of the Cup, lodging a protest to a cup result was common place, and this season Dumbarton required to defeat both Hibernian and Rangers twice following successful protests. The final opponents again were Glasgow giants Queen's Park; however, after a 2–2 draw in the first game, Dumbarton succumbed 1–4 in the replay.

10 September 1881 Cup R1	Dumbarton	9–1	Alclutha	Boghead Park
	Goal		Goal

1 October 1881 Cup R2	Vale of Leven	0–2	Dumbarton	Alexandria
			30'; 88'	Attendance: 4,500

22 October 1881 Cup R3	Dumbarton	5–0	Jamestown	Boghead Park
	Brown; Miller, J Watt			Attendance: 3,000

3 December 1881 Cup R5	Hibernian	2–6; VOID	Dumbarton	Easter Road
	Byrne; Waugh		Lindsay; Meikleham	Attendance: 5,000; Referee: Mr Thomson

24 December 1881 Cup R5	Hibernian	2–6	Dumbarton	Easter Road
	Byrne; Rourke		McAulay 7'; Brown; Meikleham; Lindsay; Hutcheson	Attendance: 4,000; Referee: Mr Thomson

28 January 1882 Cup R6	Dumbarton	2–1; VOID	Rangers	Boghead Park
	Meikleham 30'; Kennedy		Pringle 80'	Attendance: 5,000; Referee: Mr Paton

4 February 1882 Cup R6	Dumbarton	5–1	Rangers	Boghead Park
	Brown; Miller, J Lindsay; McKinnon		Hill	Attendance: 5,000

18 February 1882 Cup SF	Dumbarton	11–2	Cartvale	Boghead Park
	Kennedy 2'; Lindsay; Meikleham; McAulay; Brown (o.g.)		Fulton

18 March 1882 Cup Final	Dumbarton	2–2	Queen's Park	Cathkin Park
	Brown; Meikleham		Harrower 1', 35'	Attendance: 15,000; Referee: J Wallace

1 April 1882 Cup Final replay	Dumbarton	1–4	Queen's Park	Cathkin Park
	Miller, J 51'		Richmond 2'; Ker 55'; Harrower; Fraser 85'	Attendance: 15,000

== Glasgow Charity Cup ==
Dumbarton once again took part in the Glasgow Charity Cup during the season and after a fine replay victory over Rangers in the semi-final, came up against their old local rivals Vale of Leven in the final. The game finished in a 2–2 draw, after which there was to be a half hour's extra time. Vale of Leven did not reappear, and the referee ordered Dumbarton to kick off, which they did and duly scored. However the Charity committee decided that a replay should be played, and despite having the majority of the game the 'Vale' won by a single goal.

8 April 1882 Semifinal	Dumbarton	2–2	Rangers	Hampden Park
	Brown; Lindsay		Ramsay; Inglis	Attendance: 5,000; Referee: R Hendrie

29 April 1882 Semifinal replay	Dumbarton	4–0	Rangers	Hampden Park
	Lindsay 15' 30'; Miller, J			Attendance: 3,000; Referee: R Hendrie

20 May 1882 Final	Dumbarton	2–2	Vale of Leven	Hampden Park
	Miller; Lindsay		Brown 8'	Attendance: 7,000; Referee: J Wallace

3 June 1882 Final Replay	Dumbarton	0–1	Vale of Leven	Hampden Park
			Kennedy 90'	Attendance: 10,000; Referee: J Wallace

== Friendlies ==
During the season 16 'friendly' matches were played, including home and away fixtures against Vale of Leven, 3rd LRV and St Bernards (including a game to celebrate the opening of St Bernards new stadium at Powderhall), an 11–1 thrashing of Lanarkshire Cup holders, Thistle and three games against north of England opposition. In all, 11 were won, 2 drawn and 3 lost, scoring 66 goals and conceding 20.

3 September 1881 Friendly	Dumbarton	7–2	Vale of Leven	Boghead Park
	Lindsay; Brown; Miller, J		Goal

17 September 1881 Friendly	Kilbirnie	0–4	Dumbarton	Stonyholm Park, Kilbirnie
			Kennedy; Brown; Meikleham

8 October 1881 Friendly	Dumbarton	11–1	Thistle	Boghead Park
	Brown		Goal

15 October 1881 Friendly	Dumbarton	5–1	3rd LRV	Boghead Park
	Brown; Miller, P Miller, J Lindsay		Goal

29 October 1881 Friendly	South Western	0–0	Dumbarton	Copeland Park, Glasgow
				Attendance: 1,000

5 November 1881 Friendly	Hibernian	2–1	Dumbarton	Easter Road
	Preston; Cox		Swan	Attendance: 4,500; Referee: T Purdie

19 November 1881 Friendly	3rd LRV	0–5	Dumbarton	Cathkin Park
			6'	Attendance: 2,000

26 November 1881 Friendly	(England) Walsall Swifts	1–1	Dumbarton	The Chuckery
	Lunn 30'		Lindsay 87'	Attendance: 2,000; Referee: S Durban

17 December 1881 Friendly	Jamestown	1–4	Dumbarton	Jamestown
	Goal		Meikleham

31 December 1881 Friendly	(England) Blackburn Rovers	5–1	Dumbarton	Leamington Road
	Hargreaves 1'; Miller, P (o.g.); Strachan; Duckworth scrimmage		Miller, J	Attendance: 5,000; Referee: C Critchley

1 January 1882 Friendly	(England) Bolton Wanderers	2–3	Dumbarton	Pike's Lane
	Steel; Christie		Lindsay; Meikleham	Attendance: 5,000; Referee: S Ormerod

14 January 1882 Friendly	Dumbarton	9–0	Renfrew	Boghead Park
	Goal

21 January 1882 Friendly	Dumbarton	5–0	St Bernard's	Boghead Park
	Miller, J			Attendance: 2,500

25 February 1882 Friendly	Vale of Leven	2–0	Dumbarton	Alexandria
	Goal			Attendance: 2,000

11 March 1882 Friendly	St Bernard's	2–4	Dumbarton	Powderhall
	Young; McBeth		Miller; Lindsay; Kennedy; Meikleham	Attendance: 500; Referee: T Greenshields

27 May 1882 Friendly	Royal Albert	1–5	Dumbarton	Larkhall
	Goal		Goal

== Player statistics ==
Of note amongst those donning the club colours for the first time was Leitch Keir.
Leaving the club, after a playing career spanning over six seasons which included an international cap for Scotland, was Archie Lang.

Only includes appearances and goals in competitive Scottish Cup matches.

Player	Position	Appearances	Goals
(Scotland) John Kennedy	GK	8	0
(Scotland) Jock Hutcheson	DF	8	1
(Scotland) Michael Paton	DF	8	0
(Scotland) James McAulay	MF	8	2
(Scotland) Peter Miller	MF	8	0
(Scotland) Robert Brown	FW	8	6
(Scotland) Andrew Kennedy	FW	8	1
(Scotland) Joe Lindsay	FW	8	7
(Scotland) William McKinnon	FW	3	1
(Scotland) James Meikleham	FW	8	6
(Scotland) James Miller	FW	8	3
(Scotland) W Watt	FW	4	1
(Scotland) Hugh Wilson	FW	1	0

=== International caps ===
An international trial match was played on 4 March 1882 to consider selection of teams to represent Scotland in the upcoming games against England and Wales. Jock Hutcheson, Joe Lindsay, James McAulay and Peter Miller all took part.

As a result, Dumbarton's James McAulay and Peter Miller earned their first caps playing for Scotland against Wales and England respectively. McAulay scored a goal in the 5–0 win over the Welsh.

=== Representative match ===
Jock Hutcheson and James McAulay played in the Scotch Counties team which played Birmingham & District on 25 February 1882. The 'Scotch' men lost 1–3.

== Reserve team ==
As association football developed in Scotland, it was quite common when '1st XIs' played a fixture, a corresponding 'reserve' match would be played at the same time on the opposing side's ground. However it was not until 1882 that the first competition at national level for reserve sides made its debut – the Scottish Second XI Cup. Dumbarton went on to win the inaugural contest, beating Vale of Leven 3–0 in the final – the club's first national success.
