= 1880–81 Dumbarton F.C. season =

Dumbarton
1880–81 season
- Stadium: Boghead Park, Dumbarton
- Scottish Cup: Runners Up
Home colours

The 1880–81 season was the eighth Scottish football season in which Dumbarton competed at a national level.

== Scottish Cup ==
Following some easy wins in the early rounds, and two impressive away victories in the quarter and semi finals, against Rangers and local rivals Vale of Leven respectively, Dumbarton reach their first Scottish Cup final. In the first playing of the final, Queen's Park defeated Dumbarton by the odd goal in three, but after a successful protest due to 'crowd encroachment', a replay was ordered. However, despite good play in the second game, Dumbarton were well beaten losing 1–3.

11 September 1880 Cup R1	Dumbarton	7–0	Helensburgh Victoria	Boghead Park
	Goal

2 October 1880 Cup R2	Dumbarton	2–1	Jamestown	Boghead Park
	Lindsay		McCrimmon	Attendance: 5,000

23 October 1880 Cup R3	Dumbarton	7–1	Falkirk	Boghead Park
	Goal		Goal	Attendance: 600

13 November 1880 Cup R4	Dumbarton	9–0	Glasgow University	Boghead Park
	Kennedy, A McKinnon; McDougall (o.g.); Lindsay; Meikleham scrimmage

4 December 1880 Cup R5	St Mirren	1–5	Dumbarton	Paisley
	Goal		Goal

25 December 1880 Cup R6	Rangers	1–3	Dumbarton	Kinning Park
	Steele		Meikleham; Lindsay; McKinnon	Attendance: 4,500; Referee: M Devlin

5 February 1881 Cup SF	Vale of Leven	0–2	Dumbarton	Alexandria
			Lindsay 10'; Kennedy, A 35'	Attendance: 8,000; Referee: D Hamilton

26 March 1881 Cup Final	Dumbarton	1–2; VOID	Queen's Park	Kinning Park
	McAulay 25'		Key 15', 60'	Attendance: 20,000; Referee: D Hamilton

9 April 1881 Cup Final	Dumbarton	1–3	Queen's Park	Kinning Park
	Meikleham 55'		Smith 10', 20'; Ker 30'	Attendance: 10,000; Referee: D Hamilton

== Glasgow Charity Cup ==
Dumbarton were again invited to take part in the Glasgow Charity Cup but were heavily defeated in the semi-final by Rangers.

16 April 1881 Semifinal	Dumbarton	0–8	Rangers	Hampden Park
			Hill 2'; Struthers McKinley; Steele; Pringle scrimmage	Attendance: 4,000; Referee: Mr Ness

== Friendlies ==
Dumbarton's fixture list for the season included home and away ties against the Ayrshire Cup holders, Beith and the first club 'tour' of the north of England was undertaken during the New Year holidays with a further match being played against Blackburn Rovers during the Easter break. In all, 19 'friendly' matches were played during the season, of which 13 were won, 2 drawn and 4 lost, scoring 62 goals and conceding 26.

28 August 1880 Friendly	South Western	1–4	Dumbarton	Glasgow
	Goal		(o.g.)

4 September 1880 Friendly	Dumbarton	7–1	Kilmarnock	Boghead Park
	Goal		Goal

18 September 1880 Friendly	Dumbarton	6–1	Beith	Boghead Park
	Lindsay; Brown		Goal

25 September 1880 Friendly	Portland (Kilmarnock)	4–1	Dumbarton	Hamilton Park, Kilmarnock
	Harrison 30'; Wilson		90'

9 October 1880 Friendly	Dumbarton	2–2	Kilbirnie	Boghead Park
	Lindsay; Lang		30'

16 October 1880 Friendly	Dumbarton	6–1	Pollokshields Athletic	Boghead Park
	Miller 20'; Meikleham; Lindasay; Lang		Murray

30 October 1880 Friendly	Dumbarton	9–1	Abercorn	Boghead Park
	McKinnon; Miller; Kennedy, A scrimmage McAulay		Goal

6 November 1880 Friendly	3rd LRV	2–3	Dumbarton	Cathkin Park
	Goal		Goal

27 November 1880 Friendly	Queen's Park	3–1	Dumbarton	Hampden Park
	McNeil; Ker		Kennedy, A	Attendance: 5,000

11 December 1880 Friendly	Dumbarton	6–0	Helensburgh	Boghead Park
	Brown; Hutcheson

1 January 1881 Friendly	(England) Blackburn Rovers	1–4	Dumbarton	Alexandra Meadows
	Douglas		Meikleham 20', 21'; Lindsay; McAulay	Referee: T Sutton

3 January 1881 Friendly	(England) Darwen	2–3	Dumbarton	Barley Bank
	Rostron		Lindsay; Lang	Attendance: 4,500; Referee: T Hindle

4 January 1881 Friendly	(England) Sheffield	1–0	Dumbarton	Brammall Lane
	Barber 1'			Attendance: 600; Referee: R Sorby

12 February 1881 Friendly	Dumbarton	1–0	Rangers	Levengrove Park, Dumbarton
	Meikleham

19 March 1881 Friendly	Dumbarton	2–0	Jamestown	Boghead Park
	Kennedy			Attendance: 3,000

2 April 1881 Friendly	Renfrew	0–4	Dumbarton	Glebe Park, Renfrew
			10' 87'; 88'

23 April 1881 Friendly	(England) Blackburn Rovers	4–0	Dumbarton	Ewood Park
	Hargreaves; Beverley; Avery			Attendance: 2,000; Referee: T Sutton

30 April 1881 Friendly	Vale of Leven	1–2	Dumbarton	Alexandria
	Goal		Goal

7 May 1881 Friendly	Beith	1–1	Dumbarton	Netherhill Field,Beith
	10'		50'

== Player statistics ==
Of note amongst those donning the club's colours for the first time were James Liddle, James McAulay and Michael Paton.

Only includes appearances and goals in competitive Scottish Cup matches.

Player	Position	Appearances	Goals
(Scotland) John Kennedy	GK	8	0
(Scotland) Jock Hutcheson	DF	8	0
(Scotland) Archie Lang	DF	7	0
(Scotland) Michael Paton	DF	1	0
(Scotland) J Anderson	MF	8	0
(Scotland) Peter Miller	MF	8	0
(Scotland) Robert Brown	FW	5	0
(Scotland) Dunn	MF	2	0
(Scotland) Andrew Kennedy	FW	6	2
(Scotland) James Liddell	FW	5	0
(Scotland) Joe Lindsay	FW	8	5
(Scotland) James McAulay	FW	5	0
(Scotland) William McKinnon	FW	8	3
(Scotland) James Meikleham	FW	6	3
(Scotland) Tom Veitch	FW	3	0

=== International Cap ===
International trial matches were played on 26 February and 5 March 1881 to consider selection of teams to represent Scotland in the upcoming games against England and Wales. Jock Hutcheson, Andrew Kennedy, John Kennedy, Joe Lindsay, James McAulay, William McKinnon, James Meikleham and Peter Miller all took part.

As a result, Dumbarton's Joe Lindsay picked up his second and third caps playing for Scotland against England and Wales respectively. McKinnon was selected as a reserve.

=== Representative Match ===
Robert Brown, John Kennedy, Joe Lindsay, William McKinnon and Peter Miller were all selected to play in the Scotch Counties team which played Birmingham & District on 19 February 1881. The 'Scotch' men won 6–0 with both Brown and Lindsay scoring twice.
