= 1879–80 Dumbarton F.C. season =

Dumbarton
1879–80 season
- Stadium: Boghead Park, Dumbarton
- Scottish Cup: Semi-final
Home colours

The 1879–80 season was the seventh Scottish football season in which Dumbarton competed at a national level.

== Scottish Cup ==
Dumbarton began by beating the previous season's champions, Vale of Leven, in the first round. Thereafter Dumbarton enjoyed some big wins, including an 11–0 thrashing of Clyde, to reach the semi-final, only to lose out to eventual winners, Queen's Park, Scotland's top side at the time.

20 September 1879 Cup R1	Dumbarton	4–3	Vale of Leven	Boghead Park
	Lawrence; 55' 85'		McDougall	Attendance: 5,000

11 October 1879 Cup R2	Dumbarton	7–0	Helensburgh	Boghead Park
	Lindsay (o.g.)			Attendance: 5,000

1 November 1879 Cup R3	Dumbarton	5–0	Renton	Boghead Park
	Goal			Attendance: 5,000

22 November 1879 Cup R4	Dumbarton	11–0	Clyde	Boghead Park
	Goal			Attendance: 5,000

20 December 1879 Cup R5	Dumbarton	6–2	Kilbirnie	Boghead Park
	Goal		Goal	Attendance: 5,000

3 January 1880 Cup R6	Dumbarton	6–2	Hibernian	Boghead Park
	Goal		Rourke	Attendance: 2,000

17 January 1880 Cup SF	Queen's Park	1–0	Dumbarton	Hampden Park
	Ker 75'			Attendance: 8,000; Referee: D Hamilton

== Glasgow Charity Cup ==
Dumbarton were one of the four invitees to take part in the Glasgow Charity Cup but lost out to Rangers in the semi-final.

10 April 1880 Semifinal	Dumbarton	1–3	Rangers	Hampden Park
	Lawrence		Struthers; Steel; Hill

== Friendlies ==
Dumbarton's fixture list continued to grow and expand across the country, with home and away fixtures being played against local rivals Vale of Leven, Rangers (Glasgow), Hearts and Hibs (Edinburgh) and Ayrshire Cup holders, Kilmarnock Athletic. In all, 16 'friendly' matches were played during the season, of these 7 were won, 2 drawn and 7 lost, scoring 48 and conceding 30.

6 September 1879 Friendly	Dumbarton	3–4	Vale of Leven	Boghead Park
	Lindsay 65', 75'		15'

13 September 1879 Friendly	Alclutha	0–4	Dumbarton	Dumbarton
			Goal

4 October 1879 Friendly	Alexandra Athletic	2–2	Dumbarton	Kinning Park
	Douglas 20'; Gossland 52'		Carruthers; McKinnon	Referee: D Hamilton

18 October 1879 Friendly	Dumbarton	8–0	Govan	Boghead Park
	Lindsay

23 October 1879 Friendly	Hibernian	0–4	Dumbarton	Mayfield, Edinburgh
			Lindsay; Lawrence; Hartley	Attendance: 2,500

8 November 1879 Friendly	Dumbarton	4–2	Parkgrove	Boghead Park
	Goal		Goal

15 November 1879 Friendly	Kilmarnock Athletic	4–1	Dumbarton	Holm Quarry, Kilmarnock
	Goal		Goal

29 November 1879 Friendly	Rangers	1–0	Dumbarton	Kinning Park
	Steel			Attendance: 1,000

10 January 1880 Friendly	Partick	3–2	Dumbarton	Whiteinch
	Goal		Goal

7 February 1880 Friendly	Vale of Leven	1–0	Dumbarton	Alexandria
	Paton			Attendance: 4,000

14 February 1880 Friendly	Hearts	4–0	Dumbarton	Powderhall
	Barber, G Mitchell; Nelson scrimmage			Attendance: 500

21 February 1880 Friendly	Dumbarton	3–3	Rangers	Boghead Park
	Lawrence; Hartley		Goal

28 February 1880 Friendly	Dumbarton	7–1	Kilmarnock Athletic	Boghead Park
	Hartley; Carruthers		Smith 5'

13 March 1880 Friendly	Lennox	0–5	Dumbarton	Lennoxtown
			Goal

20 March 1880 Friendly	Dumbarton	5–2	Hearts	Boghead Park
	Goal		Goal	Attendance: 500

27 March 1880 Friendly	Jamestown	3–0	Dumbarton	Jamestown
	Goal

== Player statistics ==
Only includes appearances and goals in competitive Scottish Cup matches.

Player	Position	Appearances	Goals
(Scotland) John Kennedy	GK	7	0
(Scotland) Jock Hutcheson	DF	7	0
(Scotland) Archie Lang	DF	7	0
(Scotland) J Anderson	MF	7	0
(Scotland) Peter Miller	MF	7	0
(Scotland) Robert Brown	FW	7	0
(Scotland) J Carruthers	FW	7	0
(Scotland) David Hartley	FW	7	0
(Scotland) Alex Lawrence	FW	7	1
(Scotland) Joe Lindsay	FW	7	1
(Scotland) William McKinnon	FW	7	0

=== International Caps ===
A series of international trial matches were played to consider selection of teams to represent Scotland in the upcoming games against England and Wales, the first taking place on 28 February where J Anderson, Archie Lang, Alex Lawrence and Joe Lindsay all took part. The following week Lang played for the 'Improbables' XI to finally decide on the eleven to play against England - but was unsuccessful.

A further trial was held on 20 March to decide on the team to play Wales and as a result, Dumbarton's first international caps were awarded when Archie Lang and Joe Lindsay were selected to play for Scotland on 27 March 1880, the match resulting in a 5–1 win for Scotland with Lindsay scoring one of the goals.

=== Representative Matches ===
A series of trial matches were played at Cathkin Park on 10 January 1880 to decide on a United Counties team to play Birmingham & District. John Kennedy, Jock Hutcheson, Archie Lang and Alex Lawrence all played with Lang being selected for the final XI. However, as the game fell on the same day as the Scottish Cup semi final, he decided to play for the club.

Five weeks later, on 14 February, Lang was selected to play for Scotch Counties against a Scottish Canadian XI at Kinning Park - the game ending in a 2–2 draw.
