= 1876–77 Dumbarton F.C. season =

Dumbarton
1876–77 season
- Stadium: Lowmans Park, Dumbarton
- Scottish Cup: Third Round
Home colours

The 1876–77 season was the fourth Scottish football season in which Dumbarton competed at a national level.

== Scottish Cup ==
Despite an encouraging start in the campaign, by disposing of their local rivals Renton in the first round, Dumbarton disappointingly lost out to Lennox in the third round of the competition.

30 September 1876 Cup R1	Dumbarton	1–1	Renton	Dumbarton
	Goal		Goal

7 October 1876 Cup R1r	Renton	0–2	Dumbarton	Renton
			Goal

21 October 1876 Cup R2	Star of Leven F.C.	0–4	Dumbarton	Alexandria
			Goal

18 November 1876 Cup R2	Lennox F.C. (Scotland)	1–0	Dumbarton	Levengrove Park, Dumbarton
	Goal			Attendance: 1,000

== Friendlies ==
During the season, 8 'friendly' matches were reported to have been played, including home and away fixtures against local rivals, Vale of Leven and Glasgow side, South Western, of which 4 were won, 2 drawn and 2 lost, scoring 18 goals and conceding 6.

4 November 1876 Friendly	Dumbarton	9–0	Rovers (Glasgow)	Dumbarton
	Goal

25 November 1876 Friendly	Dumbarton	1–0	Vale of Leven	Dumbarton
	Lawrence

16 December 1876 Friendly	Renton	1–0	Dumbarton	Renton
	Goal

27 January 1877 Friendly	Alclutha F.C.	1–1	Dumbarton	Dumbarton
	Goal		Goal

3 February 1877 Friendly	Vale of Leven	3–1	Dumbarton	Alexandria
	Frasaer, W (o.g.); McPherson		Galbraith	Attendance: 1,000

25 February 1877 Friendly	Lennox F.C. (Scotland)	0–3	Dumbarton	Levengrove Park Dumbarton
			30'; 60'; Miller	Referee: Mr Whyte

3 March 1877 Friendly	Dumbarton	2–0	South Western	Dumbarton
	10'

31 March 1877 Friendly	South Western	1–1	Dumbarton	Govan
	Goal		Goal

== Player statistics ==
Only includes appearances and goals in competitive Scottish Cup matches.

Player	Position	Appearances	Goals
(Scotland) George Fraser	GK	4	0
(Scotland) W Fraser	DF	4	0
(Scotland) Archie Lang	DF	4	0
(Scotland) James Boyd	MF	1	0
(Scotland) Robert Johnston	MF	4	0
(Scotland) Measdale	MF	1	0
(Scotland) William Anderson	FW	4	0
(Scotland) Alex Galbraith	FW	2	0
(Scotland) David Hartley	FW	4	0
(Scotland) Alex Lawrence	FW	4	0
(Scotland) J McMaster	FW	4	0
(Scotland) Peter Miller	FW	4	0
(Scotland) S Watt	FW	4	0
