= 1884–85 Dumbarton F.C. season =

Dumbarton
1884–85 season
- Stadium: Boghead Park, Dumbarton
- Scottish Cup: Third Round
Home colours

The 1884–85 season was the 12th Scottish football season in which Dumbarton competed at a national level.

== Scottish Cup ==
Dumbarton's run in the Scottish Cup was short-lived as they were knocked out in the third round by Pollokshields Athletic.

Cup R1	Dumbarton	Walkover	Levendale

4 October 1884 Cup R2	Dumbarton	2–0	Albion	Boghead Park
	Hutton

25 October 1884 Cup R3	Pollokshields Athletic	4–1	Dumbarton	Haggs Castle, Glasgow
	25'; 30'		OG 15'	Referee: A Stuart

== Dumbartonshire Cup ==
As the sport continued to grow, so did the demand for more competitive football, and so began the setting up of regional competitions for clubs in specific counties/cities. The first was nine years earlier with the first playing of the East of Scotland Shield (formerly the Edinburgh FA Cup) and with the formation of the Dumbartonshire Football Association in March 1884, the first Dumbartonshire Cup was put up for competition. With three of the strongest teams in the country at the time playing out of Dumbartonshire, it was no easy feat to win the cup, and Dumbarton required to see off both of their strongest local rivals, Renton in the first round and Vale of Leven in the final, to become the first winners for the county cup.

1 November 1884 First Round	Dumbarton	4–0	Renton	Boghead Park
	Lindsay 25'; Brown; 85'			Attendance: 5,000; Referee: A Stuart

13 December 1884 Second Round	Dumbarton	10–1	Helensburgh Athletic	Boghead Park
	Lindsay; Liddell; Brown; Wilson; Miller, J McAulay		Goal

17 January 1885 Semi Final	Dumbarton	3–1	Yoker	Boghead Park
	Wilson 55'; Keir 70'; Lindsay 77'		scrimmage	Referee: J Roxburgh

28 March 1885 Final	Dumbarton	3–0	Vale of Leven	Tontine Park
	Lindsay; McKinnon			Attendance: 3,000

== Glasgow Charity Cup ==
Dumbarton reached the final of the Glasgow Charity Cup for the second time. Three tough matches against Rangers were followed by a final against their old adversary Queen's Park, where they lost by the only goal.

11 April 1885 SemiFinal	Dumbarton	2–2	Rangers	Hampden Park
	scrimmage 10'; Pringle 30' (o.g.)		55' scrimmage 75'	Attendance: 3,500

18 April 1885 SemiFinal Replay	Dumbarton	1–1 (a.e.t.)	Rangers	Hampden Park
	scrimmage 75'		Young 18'	Attendance: 5,000

2 May 1885 SemiFinal 2nd Replay	Dumbarton	2–0	Rangers	Hampden Park
	Lindsay; Miller 89'			Attendance: 7,000

9 May 1885 Final	Dumbarton	0–1	Queen's Park	Hampden Park
			Watt 5'	Attendance: 3,500

== Friendlies ==
During the season, 22 'friendly' matches were played, including a 0–0 draw against Queen's Park to celebrate the opening of the 'new' Hampden Park and 5 games against English opposition with mixed success. In all, 9 were won, 7 drawn and 6 lost, scoring 50 goals and conceding 30.

30 August 1884 Friendly	Dumbarton	4–1	Partick Thistle	Boghead Park
	Goal		scrimmage	Referee: A Colville

13 September 1884 Friendly	Dumbarton	2–0	(England) Walsall Swifts	Boghead Park
	Brown; Keir

20 September 1884 Friendly	Dumbarton	3–0	Renfrew	Boghead Park
	Meikleham; McAulay

27 September 1884 Friendly	Rangers	3–2	Dumbarton	Kinning Park
	Gossland 40', 65'		Brown (S) 42' scrimmage 60'	Attendance: 3,000

18 October 1884 Friendly	Queen's Park	0–0	Dumbarton	Hampden Park
				Attendance: 6,000

15 November 1884 Friendly	Dumbarton	6–2	Clyde	Boghead Park
	Goal		Goal

22 November 1884 Friendly	Renton	2–3	Dumbarton	Tontine Park
	20'; 75'		Goal	Attendance: 5,000

29 November 1884 Friendly	Dumbarton	1–1	Queen's Park	Boghead Park
	Brown 51'		McWhannel 80'	Attendance: 3,000; Referee: Mr McKillop

20 December 1884 Friendly	Vale of Leven	1–6	Dumbarton	Alexandria
	Goal		Brown (S) 7'; Liddell; Liddell (o.g.)	Attendance: 5,000

27 December 1884 Friendly	Queen's Park	2–1	Dumbarton	Hampden Park
	Harrower; Hamilton		Brown (P) 15'	Attendance: 5,000; Referee: Mr McKillop

1 January 1885 Friendly	(England) Blackburn Rovers	2–0	Dumbarton	Leamington Road
	Suter 80' scrimmage 87'			Attendance: 10,000; Referee: Mr Armerod

2 January 1885 Friendly	(England) Astley Bridge	4–0	Dumbarton	Astley Bridge
	Brindle 65'; Hogson; Douglas			Referee: J Quinton

3 January 1885 Friendly	(England) Walsall Swifts	1–1	Dumbarton	The Chuckery
	Morley 30'		Kennedy 60'	Attendance: 2,000; Referee: Mr Ford

5 January 1885 Friendly	(England) Aston Villa	1–1	Dumbarton	Wellington Road (Perry Barr)
	Brown 80'		Liddell 60'	Attendance: 5,000; Referee: Mr Roberts

24 January 1885 Friendly	Port Glasgow Athletic	3–3	Dumbarton	Clune Park
	Graham 10'; McCartney; Hannah 70'		33' scrimmage 44'; Brown 61'	Attendance: 3,000

7 February 1885 Friendly	Abercorn	0–3	Dumbarton	Blackstoun Park, Paisley
			Goal	Attendance: 3,000

14 February 1885 Friendly	Hibernian	2–1	Dumbarton	Easter Road
	Lee 10'; Cox 40'		Keir 75'	Attendance: 2,500

14 March 1885 Friendly	Dumbarton	1–3	Arthurlie	Boghead Park
	Goal		Jardine 15'; Donaldson 25'	Attendance: 2,500

21 March 1885 Friendly	Dumbarton	1–1	Jamestown	Boghead Park
	5' (o.g.)		Wilson 40'

4 April 1885 Friendly	Dumbarton	3–0	Hearts	Boghead Park
	McKinnon 20', 65'; McMillan

25 April 1885 Friendly	Airdrie	1–1	Dumbarton	Airdrie
	Hastie		(o.g.)	Attendance: 1,000

16 May 1885 Friendly	Dundee Our Boys	0–7	Dumbarton	West Craigie Park, Dundee
			Lindsay 8' 14' 17'; McKinnon; Kennedy 38'

== Player statistics ==
Of note amongst those donning the club's colours for the first time was Ralph Aitken.

Only includes appearances and goals in competitive Scottish Cup matches.

Player	Position	Appearances	Goals
(Scotland) James McAulay	GK	2	0
(Scotland) Jock Hutcheson	DF	2	0
(Scotland) Hugh Wilson	DF	2	0
(Scotland) Leitch Keir	MF	2	0
(Scotland) Peter Miller	MF	2	0
(Scotland) Black	FW	1	0
(Scotland) Robert 'Plumber' Brown	FW	2	0
(Scotland) Robert 'Sparrow' Brown	FW	2	0
(Scotland) Hutton	FW	1	1
(Scotland) Andrew Kennedy	FW	1	0
(Scotland) James Liddell	FW	2	0
(Scotland) Joe Lindsay	FW	1	0
(Scotland) William McKinnon	FW	1	0
(Scotland) Michael Paton	FW	1	0

=== International caps ===
An international trial match was played on 7 March 1885 to consider selection of teams to represent Scotland in the 1885 British Home Championship. Robert 'Plumber' Brown, Joe Lindsay, James McAulay and Michael Paton played for a 'Counties XI' against a 'Glasgow XI' with the latter winning 3–1, Brown scoring the 'Counties' goal.

Subsequently, five Dumbarton players were selected to play, as follows:

- Robert 'Plumber' Brown and Leitch Keir both earned their first caps against Wales.

- Joe Lindsay earned his sixth and seventh caps against England and Wales respectively. He scored the only goal in the 1–1 draw against the English - and scored a hat-trick in the 8–1 defeat of Wales.

- James McAulay earned his fifth and sixth caps against England and Wales respectively.

- Michael Paton earned his third and fourth caps against England and Wales respectively.

=== Representative matches ===
The Dumbartonshire Football Association played three representative matches during the season and Dumbarton players were selected to play as follows:

Date	Opponent	Result	Players (Goals)
11 October 1884	Glasgow	3-3	McAulay; Keir;Brown, P; Brown, S(1); Lindsay; Miller
31 January 1885	Renfrewshire	4-2	McAuley; Hutcheson; Miller; Brown, S; Lindsay; Liddell (1)
7 March 1885	Edinburgh	4-1	Hutcheson; Miller; Keir; Brown, S; McKinnon (1)

== Reserve team ==
Dumbarton withdrew from the Second Eleven Association in protest at the unsuccessful attempt to have the previous year's final against Kilmarnock Athletic replayed.
