= 1897–98 Dumbarton F.C. season =

Dumbarton
1897–98 season
- Stadium: Boghead Park, Dumbarton
- Scottish Cup: First Round
Home colours

The 1897–98 season was the 25th Scottish football season in which Dumbarton competed at national level entering the Scottish Cup. In addition Dumbarton played in the Dumbartonshire Cup.

== Scottish Cup ==
Dumbarton were knocked out in the first round by St Bernards, after a 1–1 draw.

8 January 1898 Cup R1	St Bernard's	1–1	Dumbarton	New Logie Green
	Chambers		Murphy	Attendance: 3,500; Referee: Mr Robertson

15 January 1898 Cup R1r	Dumbarton	1–3	St Bernard's	Boghead Park
	Gillies		Buchanan; Paton	Attendance: 6,000; Referee: Mr Donald

== Dumbartonshire Cup ==
Dumbarton won the Dumbartonshire Cup for the ninth time, beating Vale of Leven in the final.

26 March 1898 Final	Dumbarton	3–2	Vale of Leven	Tontine Park
	Littlejohn 10'; Speedie		Brien	Attendance: 3,000; Referee: Mr Dickson

== Friendlies ==
In the absence of any league commitments, the Dumbarton committee had to work hard to bring together a fixture list which would meet the club's financial needs.

During the season, 23 'friendly' matches were arranged, where there was much to be pleased about. There was an impressive unbeaten run of 9 games at the beginning of the season, several wins against league opposition and a successful 'mini' tour of the highlands during the New Year holidays. In all 13 were won, 4 drawn and 6 lost (4 against First Division teams and 2 against Second Division teams), scoring 69 goals and conceding 49.

It is of note that following the Scottish Cup campaign against St Bernards, many of the Dumbarton team members went 'on strike' due to apparent promises made of bonuses for the cup matches. This resulted in a number of neighbouring clubs being called upon to provide 'guest' players to fulfil the match against Partick Thistle on 22 January. Fortunately matters were settled swiftly thereafter.

2 September 1897 Friendly	Renton	0–2	Dumbarton	Tontine Park
			Reid; Mackie

4 September 1897 Friendly	Stenhousemuir	4–4	Dumbarton	Ochilview Park
	Goal		Goal

11 September 1897 Friendly	Queen's Park	2–4	Dumbarton	Hampden Park
	Berry 40'; Lambie		McFarlane 30', 45'; Speedie; Ritchie (o.g.)	Attendance: 2,000

18 September 1897 Friendly	Dumbarton	6–1	Vale of Leven	Boghead Park
	Morrice; Richmond		Goal

2 October 1897 Friendly	Leith Athletic	2–2	Dumbarton	Hawkhill
	Brown; Harvie 85'		Speedie; Mackie	Referee: Mr Peden

9 October 1897 Friendly	Falkirk	1–2	Dumbarton	Brockville Park
	Forbes 85'		Morrice 7'; Reid 8'

16 October 1897 Friendly	Abercorn	2–2	Dumbarton	Underwood Park, Paisley
	Nelson		Speedie; Murphy	Referee: Mr Wallace

23 October 1897 Friendly	Queen's Park	1–1	Dumbarton	Hampden Park
	Lambie		Mauchan

30 October 1897 Friendly	Dumbarton	2–1	Renton	Boghead Park
	(o.g.)		Goal

13 November 1897 Friendly	Dumbarton	0–1	St Mirren	Boghead Park
			Brown 40'

20 November 1897 Friendly	Morton	2–1	Dumbarton	Cappielow Park
	Dunlop; Kennedy		scrimmage

27 November 1897 Friendly	Vale of Leven	1–3	Dumbarton	Millburn Park
	Goal		Watt; Forrest; Thomson

18 December 1897 Friendly	Clyde	5–4	Dumbarton	Barrowfield Park
	Goal		Reid

25 December 1897 Friendly	Dumbarton	2–9	Kilmarnock	Boghead Park
	Murphy; Thomson,W		Goal

1 January 1898 Friendly	Inverness Clachnacuddin	4–10	Dumbarton	Inverness
	Goal		Goal	Attendance: 3,500; Referee: Mr Colville

3 January 1898 Friendly	Aberdeen	0–2	Dumbarton	Central Park, Aberdeen
			Ritchie (o.g.) (o.g.)	Referee: A Smith

22 January 1898 Friendly	Partick Thistle	1–3	Dumbarton	Meadowside
	Massie		McNab; Littlejohn	Attendance: 1,500; Referee: Mr Phillips

5 February 1898 Friendly	Dumbarton	2–3	Celtic	Boghead Park
	Mitchell; Richmond		Allan; Blessington; OG	Attendance: 4,000

19 February 1898 Friendly	E Stirling	1–4	Dumbarton	Merchiston Park
	Hastings 80' (o.g.)		McNab; Speedie 20'; Littlejohn 65'	Referee: Mr Sharp

5 March 1898 Friendly	Dumbarton	9–1	Kilmarnock Athletic	Boghead Park
	Goal		Goal

19 March 1898 Friendly	Dumbarton	2–1	Morton	Boghead Park
	Speedie		Edgar

11 April 1898 Friendly	St Bernard's	5–0	Dumbarton	New Logie Green
	Allan 1'; Newman 2'; Coltherd 10'			Attendance: 1,000

16 April 1898 Friendly	Dumbarton	2–1	Airdrie	Boghead Park
	Littlejohn		Goal

== Player statistics ==
Amongst those players leaving the club was internationalist Leitch Keir. A servant to the club since its cup winning season of 1882–83, Keir decided to move on to Motherwell.

Only includes appearances and goals in competitive Scottish Cup matches.

Player	Position	Appearances	Goals
(Scotland) John Docherty	GK	2	0
(Scotland) Samuel Skinner	DF	2	0
(Scotland) Daniel Thomson	DF	2	0
(Scotland) Morrice	MF	2	0
(Scotland) James Richmond	MF	2	0
(Scotland) William Thomson	MF	2	0
(Scotland) Daniel Coll	MF	2	0
(Scotland) Alexander Gillies	MF	2	1
(Scotland) Hugh Murphy	MF	2	1
(Scotland) Thomas Reid	MF	2	0
(Scotland) Willie Speedie	MF	2	0

=== International caps ===
William Thomson earned his third and fourth caps against Wales and Ireland respectively in the 1898 British Home Championship.

=== Representative match ===
A Dumbartonshire XI played against a Lanarkshire XI on 29 January 1898 in which Docherty, Daniel Thomson, William Thomson, Lewis Mackie and Speedie were all selected to play - Willie Speedie scored the Dumbarton county goal in the 1–1 draw.

== Reserve team ==
Dumbarton lost in the first round of the Scottish Second XI Cup to Queen's Park.
