= 1900–01 Dumbarton F.C. season =

Dumbarton
1900–1901 season
- Stadium: Boghead Park, Dumbarton
- Scottish Cup: First Round
Home colours

The 1900–01 season was the 28th Scottish football season in which Dumbarton competed at national level entering the Scottish Cup and the Scottish Qualifying Cup. In addition Dumbarton played in the Dumbartonshire Cup.

== Scottish Qualifying Cup ==
Qualification for the Scottish Cup was gained by reaching the fifth round of the Scottish Qualifying Cup before losing out to East Stirling.

23 September 1900 QualifyCup R2	Dumbarton	2–0	Carfin Emmett	Boghead Park
	Thomson, W (o.g.)

13 October 1900 QualifyCup R3	Glasgow University	0–4	Dumbarton	University Grounds, Glasgow
			Fullarton	Referee: Mr Frame

20 October 1900 QualifyCup R4	Arthurlie	1–2	Dumbarton	Dunterlie Park (1882–1906)
	Goal		Goal

3 November 1900 QualifyCup R5	E Stirling	2–0	Dumbarton	Merchiston Park
	Shearer 7'; Reid 65'			Attendance: 4,000; Referee: Mr Banks

== Scottish Cup ==
Dumbarton were no match for First Division opponents Hibernian in the first round of the Scottish Cup.

12 January 1901 Cup R1	Hibernian	7–0	Dumbarton	Easter Road
	Atherton; Robertson; Callaghan; Boyle; Murray			Attendance: 1,500; Referee: Mr Jackson

== Dumbartonshire Cup ==
The Dumbartonshire Cup was again played on a league basis. Only three teams entered and after the first stage, Vale of Leven topped the league. Dumbarton beat Renton in the semi-final but lost out to 'Vale' in the final.

1 December 1900 League	Dumbarton	1–0	Renton	Boghead Park
	Thomson, D

15 December 1900 League	Renton	2–2	Dumbarton	Tontine Park
	McGowan		Goal

22 December 1900 League	Vale of Leven	4–1	Dumbarton	Millburn Park
	Goal		Goal

13 April 1901 League	Dumbarton	1–3	Vale of Leven	Boghead Park
	Howie 2'		O'Brien 1'; Mills; Paton

3 May 1901 Semi-final	Renton	1–1	Dumbarton	Tontine Park
	McGowan		Kennedy

8 May 1901 Semi-final Replay	Renton	1–2	Dumbarton	Tontine Park
	Goal		Speedie; Kennedy

11 May 1901 Final	Dumbarton	1–2	Vale of Leven	Tontine Park
	Goal		10'	Referee: Mr McLachlan

== Friendlies ==
Another season without league football saw fixtures and attendances fall away badly.

A meagre 6 'friendly' matches were played during the season, with even a match against Celtic attracting fewer than 1,000 spectators. In all 2 were won and 4 lost, scoring 12 goals and conceding 15.

At the end of the season an AGM proposal to disband the club was accepted, so just 10 years after being crowned as Scottish league champions Dumbarton F.C. went out of existence, and would not re-appear again until August 1905.

18 August 1900 Friendly	Ayr Parkhouse	5–3	Dumbarton	Beresford Park
	Goal		Goal

20 August 1900 Friendly	Dumbarton	1–3	Celtic	Boghead Park
	Mackie		Divers 5', 10'	Attendance: 500

25 August 1900 Friendly	Renton	0–4	Dumbarton	Tontine Park
			Fullarton; Richmond

1 September 1900 Friendly	Partick Thistle	5–2	Dumbarton	Meadowside
	Hyslop; Murray; Henderson; Freebairn; Atherton		Thomson,W 8'; Mackie	Attendance: 1,000

29 September 1900 Friendly	Dumbarton	0–1	Vale of Leven	Boghead Park
			Goal

17 November 1900 Friendly	Dumbarton	2–1	Scottish Amateur XI	Boghead Park
	Goal		Goal

== Player statistics ==
No.	Pos	Nat	Player	Total		Scottish Cup		Qualifying Cup	
No.	Pos	Nat	Player	Apps	Goals	Apps	Goals	Apps	Goals
	GK	(Scotland) SCO	Smith	1	0	0	0	1	0
	GK	(Scotland) SCO	Walker	4	0	1	0	3	0
	DF	(Scotland) SCO	Montgomerie	5	0	1	0	4	0
	DF	(Scotland) SCO	Daniel Thomson	5	0	1	0	4	0
	MF	(Scotland) SCO	Howie	1	0	1	0	0	0
	MF	(Scotland) SCO	Richardson	1	0	0	0	1	0
	MF	(Scotland) SCO	James Richmond	5	0	1	0	4	0
	MF	(Scotland) SCO	William Thomson	5	1	1	0	4	1
	FW	(Scotland) SCO	Fullarton	4	1	1	1	3	0
	FW	(Scotland) SCO	Kennedy	1	0	1	0	0	0
	FW	(Scotland) SCO	Lewis Mackie	5	0	1	0	4	0
	FW	(Scotland) SCO	McColl	4	0	0	0	4	0
	FW	(Scotland) SCO	McSkimming	4	0	1	0	3	0
	FW	(Scotland) SCO	John Millar	2	0	0	0	2	0
	FW	(Scotland) SCO	Daniel Paton	1	0	0	0	1	0
	FW	(Scotland) SCO	Thomas Reid	2	0	1	0	1	0
	FW	(Scotland) SCO	Willie Speedie	5	0	1	0	4	0
	FW	(Scotland) SCO	Thomas Wingate	1	0	0	0	1	0

== Reserve team ==
Dumbarton lost in the second round of the Scottish Second XI Cup to Queen's Park.
