= 1905–06 Dumbarton F.C. season =

Dumbarton
1905–1906 season
- Stadium: Boghead Park, Dumbarton
- Scottish Combination League: 1st
- Top goalscorer: League: Crawford/McCormack (10); All: Crawford/McCormack/Stewart (10)

The 1905–06 season was the 29th Scottish football season in which Dumbarton competed at national level, entering the Scottish Qualifying Cup. In addition Dumbarton played in the Scottish Combination League and the Dumbartonshire Cup.

== Story of the season ==
In June 1905 Dumbarton Football Club was reformed with applications being made to the SFA and the Scottish Combination League for admission. Once accepted, Dumbarton joined their neighbours Renton in the Combination but Vale of Leven had been elected to the Second Division of the Scottish League, and their place was taken by Stenhousemuir.

=== August ===
The first game of the new season took place at Boghead on Tuesday 15 August against a strong Rangers XI in a friendly fixture and in a confident display the debut of the revived Sons of the Rock was a success, running out 3–1 victors.

Dumbarton's first competitive game in over four years was played at Boghead in a league fixture against local rivals Renton on 19 August. The Sons strongest XI was present for this Combination League tie and despite being goalless at the interval Dumbarton piled on the pressure in the second half to win comfortably 3–0.

Perhaps trying to take as much advantage of their new status as possible Dumbarton played two midweek friendlies on 23 and 24 August against Queen's Park (home) and Vale of Leven (away) respectively. In the first against old rivals Queen's Park the team showed one change with James Stevenson (ex Notts County) coming in place of Crawford. The game was evenly contested and finished in a 3–3 draw. In the second against neighbours Vale a number of new players were given tryouts but despite this Dumbarton challenged the Second Division team strongly only losing out 2–1.

On 26 August it was back to league business with an away tie against Alloa Athletic. Crawford returned but this time Stevenson replaced McMurray at inside left. Dumbarton started strongly but it was Alloa who established an early 3–0 lead. Dumbarton however came back and by half time had reduced the arrears to 4–2. A goal each was secured in the second half and Dumbarton lost 5–3.

=== September ===
The first weekend of September saw Dumbarton drawn away in the Qualifying Cup to Lanarkshire side Carfin Emmett, although by agreement the sides decided to play at Boghead. Walker replaced Davie in goals and John Temple (ex Dumbarton Corinthians) came in at left back. The changes did not seem to hinder the Sons as they strolled to a 4–0 victory.

The following Saturday it was a league tie in Ayrshire against Galston. The teams showed a couple of changes with Hendry replacing Cairney at left half and trialist Hoall took Stevenson's place at inside right. In a disappointing match Dumbarton manage to snatch a point with a late goal in a 1–1 draw.

On 16 September Dumbarton had a hard task as they were drawn against Second Division side Hamilton Academical in the second round of the Qualifying Cup. Offers had been made by Hamilton to switch the venue but Dumbarton decided that the locals deserved to have their favourites at home. Davie returned in goal as did McMurray at inside left. Nonetheless, it was the Accies who took the tie 2-0 and advanced to the next round.

A week later another Lanarkshire side visited Boghead – Dykehead on league business. There was a reshuffle in the Dumbarton team with Hendry returning in place of Colquhoun and a debut for McLachlan at left half. Unfortunately the changes did not have the desired effect and in a disappointing game Dykehead left with both points after a 2–1 win.

After two home defeats it was hoped that Dumbarton's third home fixture on the trot would bring better results. Three new faces were introduced – Richard Oldcorn in goal and Francis McCormack on the left wing who had both impressed in the Qualifying Cup tie for Carfin despite the result, and McHarg (ex Ayr Parkhouse). The opponents were Ayr Parkhouse and on the day Dumbarton got back into winning ways with a 4–0 victory – and that despite losing McCallum to injury 10 minutes into the second half.

So at the end of September Stenhousemuir led in the league with 8 points from their four matches. Dumbarton were in 5th with 5 points.

=== October ===
At the beginning of the month the Dumbartonshire Football Association reformed and agreed to play the county championship by way of a league involving Dumbarton, Renton and Vale of Leven with home and away ties – the top two then playing off for the title.

On 7 October Dumbarton played their return league fixture against Renton at Tontine Park. Anderson was introduced in place of McHarg, with Crawford and McMurray returning to the team. In a tough contest the Sons just got the better of their county neighbours by 2–1.

A week later Dumbarton entertained Thornliebank at Boghead for their league fixture. The Sons were never troubled and eased to a 3–1 win.

After a free Saturday, Dumbarton continued their league campaign with an away tie against Bathgate. An unchanged side turned out. The visitors adapted to the muddy conditions much quicker but a brilliant display by the Bathgate keeper kept the score at the interval at 1-1. The keeper continued to thwart the Dumbarton front men until at last a winner was found and a valuable 2 points gained.

So Dumbarton now had pushed up the league, and though Stenhousemuir still led with 12 points from 7 matches, Dumbarton were just a point behind having played 8 games.

=== November ===
A full strength team turned out on 4 November at Tontine Park to play Renton in their first fixture of the Dumbartonshire Cup. A close tussle was expected and so it seemed up till the interval when the score was goalless. In the second half however there was only one team in it as Dumbarton strolled to a 6–1 win.

The following weekend Dumbarton entertained league leaders Stenhousemuir at Boghead. Once again an unchanged squad took to the field and in muddy conditions took control from the start. Just one goal ahead at the interval Dumbarton pushed hard in the second half and added another three for a comfortable 4–0 win.

On 18 November Dumbarton travelled to Ayr to play the Parkhouse in their return fixture. McCallum replaced Colquhoun but the change had no effect on the Dumbarton confidence as they ran out winners by 5–2.

A week later it was back to Boghead to welcome Royal Albert in the league. Unfortunately the referee failed to turn up but the teams agreed to play a friendly. Dumbarton had a new face in the front line, Alex Lockhart (ex Dumbarton Harp) taking Anderson's place. The Larkhall club began well and scored first but Dumbarton equalised before the interval. As had been the case in recent matches Dumbarton moved up a gear in the second half and put on another three goals to win by 4–1.

So as November ended Dumbarton maintained their 2nd place still a point behind Stenhousemuir, but with the game in hand.

=== December ===
Dumbarton's winning streak stretched back to September when their last loss was at home against Dykehead. So on 2 December the Sons were looking for revenge when they visited Shotts to play the Dykehead team in the return fixture. As it was following a close match the home side took the spoils in a 3–2 win.

The following Saturday Dumbarton were to have played Bathgate in a league fixture but due to a clash of cup commitments, the Sons instead played a friendly against King's Park at Boghead. On the day Dumbarton had no difficulty in getting back to winning ways and comfortably brushed aside the Stirlingshire men 5–1.

On 16 December Dumbarton travelled to Ochilview Park to visit the league leaders Stenhousemuir. A few weeks previously the Sons had dispatched the Warriors by 4-0 but even with their strongest team available the task was a challenging one. In the game Dumbarton began furiously and had two goals disallowed for offside before Lockhart scored. However, before the interval Stenhousemuir equalised. In the second half the match swung to and fro but in the end the Sons ran out 4–3 winners – thus ending Stenhousemuir's unbeaten home record.

Following the recent postponement, Dumbarton welcomed Bathgate to Boghead in the league on 23 December. Dumbarton brought in Dumbarton Corinthian Tom Kelso at right back in place of Mitchell but as it happened the defence were rarely troubled in an easy 4–0 win.

A week later, Dumbarton were again at home, this time to Queens Park Strollers. While the Combination League had for some time welcomed the second XIs of a number of ‘big’ league sides, the only one left was the second team of the Hampden Park amateurs. In a game in front of a crowd, the Sons had a goal victory, a victory for the display of the Queens Park keeper.

So as 1905 ended Dumbarton were still in second place with 19 points from 13 games. (During the month Thornliebank had been expelled from the league and all their results expunged including the win gained by Dumbarton in October.)

=== January ===
For the New Year holidays Dumbarton arranged a friendly with Second Division front runners Clyde on 3 January at Boghead. Despite miserable conditions the confidence of the Dumbarton team continued as they cruised to a 6–3 win.

After a weekend ruined by winter weather, Dumbarton played their postponed league tie against Royal Albert on 13 January at Boghead. In the friendly played in November when the referee failed to appear the Sons won 4–1, and on this occasion with a full strength team they went one goal better and took both points with a 5–1 victory.

The same team turned out the following Saturday for a friendly fixture with Combination rivals Stenhousemuir at Boghead. In the league encounter in November Dumbarton had eased to a 4–0 win- and for the second week in a row they bettered their previous score by a goal by winning 5–0.

On 27 January Dumbarton entertained Renton in the return fixture of the Dumbartonshire Cup. Robert Ferguson trialled at right bank but otherwise a full strength team was available. On the day the home team won easily by 3–0.

At the end of the month in addition to topping the county league, Dumbarton had at last reached the top of the Combination league with 21 points from 14 games.

=== February ===
On 3 February Dumbarton returned to league business and it was again Royal Albert that provided the opposition, but this time at Larkhall. John Brander (ex Clydebank Corinthians) appeared at inside left in place of McMurray. A tougher tussle was envisaged but on the day the Sons were the better side and won easily by 4–1.

A week later, Ferguson replaced Temple at left back as Galston made the return trip to Boghead. The Ayrshire side had taken a point from Dumbarton in the first fixture, but despite holding the Sons to a 2-1 interval lead, the home side eased to their tenth successive win by scoring a further three goals in the second half, to win 5-2 – Crawford netting a hat trick.

With no competitive fixture, Dumbarton played host to Second Division side Abercorn on 17 February. In a close encounter it was the Sons who came out on top by the only goal scored by McCormack.

For the second successive week there was no league or cup fixture to play, but on 24 February Dumbarton played Clyde in a friendly at Boghead. The Sons had already defeated their opponents in January by 6–3, but this encounter was a much closer affair. The home side led at the interval 1–0, only for Clyde to equalise early in the second half. Dumbarton came back again to lead 2-1 but before time was called Clyde levelled matters at 2-2.

So as February came to an end Dumbarton were still at the top of the league with 25 points from 16 games. Stenhousemuir were a point behind with a game more played.

=== March ===
On 3 March Dumbarton visited Cathkin Park to play Queen's Park Strollers. In the home league tie the Sons had won by the only goal, but since that time the teams had differing fortunes in the league in that while Dumbarton topped the league the Strollers were anchored at the bottom. On the day the result was never in doubt, the Dumbarton men trouncing their opponents by 6-1 – new boy Bob Gordon scoring one of the goals.

After a free week, Beith made the trip to Boghead to play the first of the league fixtures between the clubs. Beith were the reigning league champions but results this season had been hard to come by. A strong Dumbarton team swept aside any challenge that Beith mustered and won by 3–0, McCormack scoring all three goals.

On 24 March, the first of the county ties against Vale of Leven took place at Boghead in front of an ‘enormous’ crowd. With an unbeaten run of 14 games Dumbarton were the undoubted favourites over their Second Division rivals, but with a disappointing display from the forwards, Vale took the spoils by the only goal of the game.

On the final day of March Dumbarton travelled to Beith to fulfil their return league fixture, knowing that a single point would secure the Combination championship. The full strength team were not leaving anything to chance and matched the score of 3-0 gained a fortnight earlier.

So the championship flag would fly at Boghead next season.

=== April ===
Dumbarton followed up a free week by entertaining Johnstone at Boghead in a friendly on 14 April. A full strength home side took no pity on their opponents and gave them a sound thrashing by 6–0.

The following Saturday Dumbarton travelled to Millburn Park to play the return county fixture with Vale of Leven. Having lost the home tie by the single goal to their Second Division opponents in March, the Sons were anxious to level matters. However, despite having most of the game it was the Vale who again scored the only goal of the game.

At the end of the league part of the county championship, Renton, Vale of Leven and Dumbarton had each won two of their four games but by means of the worst goal average it would be Renton that would miss out on the final.

=== May ===
The final of the Dumbartonshire Cup was played on 5 May against Vale of Leven at Tontine Park. Having lost both of the qualifying matches by a goal to nil the question was would it be third time lucky? Unfortunately it was a case of a third 1–0 defeat and Vale retained the county championship for a further year.

The following Thursday evening the Sons travelled once again to meet Vale of Leven, this time in a benefit match for a former Vale player George McKinlay, and at last a victory was recorded by 2–0.

The last game of Dumbarton's season was played on 12 May with a friendly against Renton at Tontine Park. Renton went into a two-goal lead early in the second half, but the Sons fought back to gain a 2–2 draw.

Following the winning of the Combination league, Dumbarton applied for admitted to the Second Division of the Scottish League. The committee met on 22 May to decide on the ‘ups’ and ‘downs’ and in the case of the Second Division, the bottom two clubs (including Vale of Leven) were up against 11 clubs from other affiliated leagues (including Dumbarton and Renton). On the vote Vale retained their place and Dumbarton would join them. Results as follows:

Team	Votes	Result
Vale of Leven	22	Re-elected to Second Division
Ayr Parkhouse	14	Promoted from Scottish Combination
Ayr	13	Re-elected to Second Division
Dumbarton	12	Promoted from Scottish Combination

== Match results ==
=== Scottish Combination League ===
19 August 1905 Combination League	Dumbarton	3–0	Renton	Boghead Park
	McMurray; McMillan; Speedie			Attendance: 2,000; Referee: Mr Lithgow

26 August 1905 Combination League	Alloa	5–3	Dumbarton	Recreation Park, Alloa
	Fraser 3'; Bauchop 20'; Craig 30'		McMillan; Stewart	Referee: Mr Young

9 September 1905 Combination League	Galston	1–1	Dumbarton	Galston, Ayrshire
	Goal		Colquhoun	Referee: Mr Stevenson

23 September 1905 Combination League	Dumbarton	1–2	Dykehead	Boghead Park
	McMillan		Goal	Attendance: 2,000; Referee: Mr Edward

30 September 1905 Combination League	Dumbarton	4–0	Ayr Parkhouse	Boghead Park
	Stevenson; Colquhoun; Stewart; McHarg			Attendance: 2,000

7 October 1905 Combination League	Renton	1–2	Dumbarton	Tontine Park
	Goal		Stewart; Crawford	Referee: Mr Thomson

14 October 1905 Combination League	Dumbarton	3–1; VOID	Thornliebank	Boghead Park
	Goal		Goal

28 October 1905 Combination League	Bathgate	1–2	Dumbarton	Mill Park, Bathgate
	Fox		Stewart; Crawford	Referee: Mr Malcolm

11 November 1905 Combination League	Dumbarton	4–0	Stenhousemuir	Boghead Park
	Crawford 25'; Anderson; McMurray			Attendance: 1,000; Referee: J McInnes

18 November 1905 Combination League	Ayr Parkhouse	2–5	Dumbarton	Beresford Park
	Goal		McMurray; Stewart; Crawford; McCormack

2 December 1905 Combination League	Dykehead	3–2	Dumbarton	Parkside, Shotts
	Goal		Goal

16 December 1905 Combination League	Stenhousemuir	3–4	Dumbarton	Ochilview Park
	Murray; Whyte; Haddow		McCormack; Stewart; Lockhart	Referee: Mr Malcolm

23 December 1905 Combination League	Dumbarton	4–0	Bathgate	Boghead Park
	25'; 40'

30 December 1905 Combination League	Dumbarton	1–0	Queen's Park Strollers	Boghead Park
	McKinlay

13 January 1906 Combination League	Dumbarton	5–1	Royal Albert	Boghead Park
	Goal		Goal

3 February 1906 Combination League	Royal Albert	1–4	Dumbarton	Raploch Park
	Goal		Stewart; Crawford; McCormack

10 February 1906 Combination League	Dumbarton	5–2	Galston	Boghead Park
	Crawford; Stewart; Brander		Goal

3 March 1906 Combination League	Queen's Park Strollers	1–6	Dumbarton	Hampden Park
	Goal		Crawford; McCormack; Galbraith; Gordon

17 March 1906 Combination League	Dumbarton	3–0	Beith	Boghead Park
	McCormack

31 March 1906 Combination League	Beith	0–3	Dumbarton	Glebe Park, Beith
			Colquhoun; Gordon; McCormack

==== Final league table ====
Top three
Pos	Team	Pld	W	D	L	GF	GA	GD	Pts
1	Dumbarton	19	15	1	3	62	23	+39	31
2	Stenhousemuir	20	13	2	5	41	25	+16	28
3	Alloa Athletic	18	11	2	5	38	24	+14	24

Note: Amongst others, the return fixture between Dumbarton and Alloa Athletic was never played, presumably as the result would not have affected the outcome of the league championship.

=== Scottish Qualifying Cup ===
2 September 1905 QualifyCup R1	Dumbarton	4–0	Carfin Emmett	Boghead Park
	Stewart; Speedie; Colquhoun			Attendance: 1,500

16 September 1905 QualifyCup R1	Dumbarton	0–2	Hamilton	Boghead Park
			Findlay 5'; Dargue	Attendance: 3,000; Referee: Mr Clark

=== Dumbartonshire Cup ===
4 November 1905 League	Renton	1–6	Dumbarton	Tontine Park
	Ritchie		Stevenson 60'; McCormack; Anderson; Stewart 70'; McMurray	Attendance: 2,000

27 January 1906 League	Dumbarton	3–0	Renton	Boghead Park
	Stewart; Galbraith (o.g.)			Attendance: 3,000

24 March 1906 League	Dumbarton	0–1	Vale of Leven	Boghead Park
			Ellis

21 April 1906 League	Vale of Leven	1–0	Dumbarton	Millburn Park
	Ellis			Attendance: 4,000; Referee: J Stark

5 May 1906 Final	Dumbarton	0–1	Vale of Leven	Tontine Park
			Stewart (pen.)	Attendance: 2,000; Referee: J Milne

==== Final league table ====
Pos	Team	Pld	W	D	L	GF	GA	GD	Pts
1	Dumbarton	4	2	0	2	9	3	+6	4
2	Vale of Leven	4	2	0	2	3	3	0	4
3	Renton	4	2	0	2	4	10	−6	4

=== Friendlies ===
15 August 1905 Friendly	Dumbarton	3–1	Rangers XI	Boghead Park
	Stewart; Speedie; McMillan		Blackader	Referee: J McLeod

23 August 1905 Friendly	Dumbarton	3–3	Queen's Park	Boghead Park
	Stewart 30', 45'; McMurray		Eadie 10'; Smith 15'; Tennant 25'	Attendance: 1,000

24 August 1905 Friendly	Vale of Leven	2–1	Dumbarton	Millburn Park
	Goal		Stevenson 25'	Attendance: 2,000

25 November 1905 Friendly	Dumbarton	4–1	Royal Albert	Boghead Park
	McCormack; McMurray; Stevenson		Paterson

9 December 1905 Friendly	Dumbarton	5–1	King's Park	Boghead Park
	Goal		Chalmers

6 January 1906 Friendly	Dumbarton	6–3	Clyde	Boghead Park
	McKinlay; McCormack		Goal

20 January 1906 Friendly	Dumbarton	5–0	Stenhousemuir	Boghead Park
	Crawford; McCormack; Stewart; McMurray

17 February 1906 Friendly	Dumbarton	1–0	Abercorn	Boghead Park
	McCormack

24 February 1906 Friendly	Dumbarton	2–2	Clyde	Boghead Park
	Crawford; Stewart		Goal	Attendance: 1,500

14 April 1906 Friendly	Dumbarton	6–0	Johnstone	Boghead Park
	McCormack; Gordon; Galbraith

10 May 1906 Friendly	Vale of Leven	0–2	Dumbarton	Millburn Park
			Goal

12 May 1906 Friendly	Renton	2–2	Dumbarton	Tontine Park
	Turner 35'; McLaughlin 55'		Stevenson 70' (pen.); McCormack 80'

== Player statistics ==
Reforming after a five-year gap meant a completely new team required to be built and local interest was keen – and so at the beginning of the season the first XI shaped up as follows- goal: Charles Davie (ex Renton) – backs: Harry Mitchell and David McGregor (both ex Renton) – half backs: Alex McCallum, John Crawford (both ex Renton) and Thomas Cairney (ex St Mirren) – forwards: James Stewart (ex Ashfield), William Speedie (ex Renton), Peter McMillan, Alex McMurray (ex Motherwell) and William Colquhoun (ex Dumbarton Harp).

No.	Pos	Nat	Player	Total		Combination League		Qualifying Cup	
No.	Pos	Nat	Player	Apps	Goals	Apps	Goals	Apps	Goals
	GK	(Scotland) SCO	Charles Davie	3	0	2	0	1	0
	GK	(Scotland) SCO	Richard Oldcorn	16	0	15	0	1	0
	GK	(Scotland) SCO	Walker	3	0	2	0	1	0
	DF	(Scotland) SCO	Robert Ferguson	1	0	1	0	0	0
	DF	(Scotland) SCO	Tom Kelso	1	0	1	0	0	0
	DF	(Scotland) SCO	David McGregor	2	0	2	0	0	0
	DF	(Scotland) SCO	John McKinlay	2	1	2	1	0	0
	DF	(Scotland) SCO	Harry Mitchell	19	0	17	0	2	0
	MF	(Scotland) SCO	Thomas Cairney	20	0	18	0	2	0
	MF	(Scotland) SCO	William Colquhoun	19	3	17	2	2	1
	MF	(Scotland) SCO	John Crawford	18	10	16	10	2	0
	MF	(Scotland) SCO	John Hendry	3	0	3	0	0	0
	MF	(Scotland) SCO	Alex McCallum	8	0	6	0	2	0
	MF	(Scotland) SCO	Hugh McLachlan	1	0	1	0	0	0
	MF	(Scotland) SCO	James Stevenson	17	1	16	1	1	0
	MF	(Scotland) SCO	John Temple	18	0	16	0	2	0
	FW	(Scotland) SCO	Anderson	5	2	5	2	0	0
	FW	(Scotland) SCO	John Brander	2	1	2	1	0	0
	FW	(Scotland) SCO	George Galbraith	5	1	5	1	0	0
	FW	(Scotland) SCO	Bob Gordon	3	2	3	2	0	0
	FW	(Scotland) SCO	Hoall	1	0	1	0	0	0
	FW	(Scotland) SCO	Alex Lockhart	2	1	2	1	0	0
	FW	(Scotland) SCO	Francis McCormick	15	10	15	10	0	0
	FW	(Scotland) SCO	McHarg	1	1	1	1	0	0
	FW	(Scotland) SCO	Peter McMillan	6	3	4	3	2	0
	FW	(Scotland) SCO	Alex McMurray	13	5	12	5	1	0
	FW	(Scotland) SCO	Porterfield	2	0	2	0	0	0
	FW	(Scotland) SCO	Willie Speedie	6	2	4	1	2	1
	FW	(Scotland) SCO	James Stewart	20	10	18	8	2	2
