= 1898–99 Dumbarton F.C. season =

Dumbarton
1898–99 season
- Stadium: Boghead Park, Dumbarton
- Scottish Cup: First Round
- Top goalscorer: League: All: Willie Speedie (6)
Home colours

The 1898–99 season was the 26th Scottish football season in which Dumbarton competed at national level entering the Scottish Cup and the Scottish Qualifying Cup. In addition Dumbarton played in the Dumbartonshire Cup.

== Scottish Qualifying Cup ==
Since 1895, the smaller clubs required to enter the Scottish Qualifying Cup in order to gain access to the Scottish Cup proper. This season, for the first time, Dumbarton were required to pre-qualify for the Scottish Cup and did so by reaching the fourth round of the Qualifying Cup before losing out to Renton.

24 September 1898 QualifyCup R1	Dumbarton	6–2	Linthouse	Boghead Park
	Miller, J Littlejohn; Speedie 55'; Thomson		45'

8 October 1898 QualifyCup R2	Thornliebank	2–4	Dumbarton	Thornliebank
	Goal		Speedie; Littlejohn	Attendance: 1,000; Referee: Mr Robertson

22 October 1898 QualifyCup R3	Dumbarton	7–1	Glasgow University	Boghead Park
	Miller, J Speedie; Littlejohn		Goal

5 November 1898 QualifyCup R4	Renton	3–2	Dumbarton	Tontine Park
	(pen.); Brady 50'		Speedie	Referee: Mr McLeod

== Scottish Cup ==
Dumbarton's appearance in the Scottish Cup itself was short-lived being knocked out in the first round by East Stirlingshire.

14 January 1899 Cup R1	East Stirling	4–1	Dumbarton	Merchiston Park
	Jardine scrimmage Hailstones 90'		Gillies 40'	Attendance: 4,000; Referee: Mr Hardie

== Dumbartonshire Cup ==
Dumbarton continued to dominate the local scene by retaining the Dumbartonshire Cup, beating Vale of Leven in a two-legged semi final then Renton in the final.

11 February 1899 Semi Final First Leg	Vale of Leven	3–2	Dumbarton	Millburn Park
	Goal		Speedie

25 February 1899 Semi Final Second Leg	Dumbarton	4–0 (6–3 agg.)	Vale of Leven	Boghead Park
	Mackie

22 April 1899 Final	Dumbarton	6–3	Renton	Millburn Park
	Speedie		Goal	Attendance: 600

== Friendlies ==
For a second season Dumbarton were without league fixtures, and the task of building a fixture list with attractive opponents was becoming more difficult.

During the season, 15 'friendly' matches were played, including close defeats home and away against Celtic, and fixtures against Ayrshire Cup holders, Kilmarnock, Lanarkshire Cup holders, Airdrie and Perthshire Cup holders, Fair City Athletic, in the latter case to open Fair City's new ground. In all, 6 were won and 9 lost, scoring 45 goals and conceding 45.

24 August 1898 Friendly	Dumbarton	1–3	Celtic	Boghead Park
	Mackie		Somers; Campbell; 85'	Attendance: 4,500; Referee: Mr McLeod

27 August 1898 Friendly	Vale of Leven	0–3	Dumbarton	Millburn Park
			Ward; Mackie

17 September 1898 Friendly	Kilmarnock	8–2	Dumbarton	Rugby Park
	Findlay; Young; Howie; Reid		Millar

1 October 1898 Friendly	Dumbarton	2–3	Renton	Boghead Park
	Mackie; Thomson (pen.)		Traill 5'; Martin

15 October 1898 Friendly	Dumbarton	3–4	Scottish Amateur XI	Boghead Park
	Gillies; Morrice		Goal

12 November 1898 Friendly	Celtic	3–2	Dumbarton	Celtic Park
	McMahon; Divers		Littlejohn; Speedie	Attendance: 2,500; Referee: Mr Richmond

26 November 1898 Friendly	Dumbarton	5–3	Linthouse	Boghead Park
	Speedie; Gillies; Miller, J Wingate		Goal

3 December 1898 Friendly	Queen's Park	8–2	Dumbarton	Hampden Park
	Lambie; McColl; Mauchan (o.g.) (o.g.); Mitchell (o.g.)		Mackie; Speedie	Referee: Mr Ellis

10 December 1898 Friendly	Dumbarton	7–1	Airdrie	Boghead Park
	Miller (pen.) (pen.); Speedie; Wingate; Morrice; Littlejohn		Goldie

24 December 1898 Friendly	Renton	2–0	Dumbarton	Tontine Park
	Goal

7 January 1899 Friendly	Dumbarton	6–0	King's Park	Boghead Park
	Gillies; Miller, J Mackie; Wingate		Goldie

4 February 1899 Friendly	Dundee	5–3	Dumbarton	Carolina Port
	McColl (pen.); Clark; Black scrimmage Kellor		Wingate scrimmage

18 February 1899 Friendly	Dumbarton	4–1	Renton	Boghead Park
	Lang; Speedie; Gillies		Goal

16 March 1899 Friendly	Fair City Athletic	4–3	Dumbarton	Balhousie Park, Perth
	Campbell; Farrell		Goal

8 April 1899 Friendly	Ayr Parkhouse	0–2	Dumbarton	Beresford Park
			Goal

== Player statistics ==
The lack of league participation continued to take a toll on the players willing to serve the club and, amongst others, John Docherty, James Richmond and internationalist William Thomson left the club to join Celtic, Partick Thistle and Clyde respectively.

No.	Pos	Nat	Player	Total		Scottish Cup		Qualifying Cup	
No.	Pos	Nat	Player	Apps	Goals	Apps	Goals	Apps	Goals
	GK	(Scotland) SCO	G Millar	5	0	1	0	4	0
	DF	(Scotland) SCO	Andrew Mauchlen	5	0	1	0	4	0
	DF	(Scotland) SCO	Daniel Thomson	4	1	0	0	4	1
	MF	(Scotland) SCO	John Gillan	4	0	1	0	3	0
	MF	(Scotland) SCO	Kennedy	4	0	1	0	3	0
	MF	(Scotland) SCO	Henry Mitchell	3	0	1	0	2	0
	MF	(Scotland) SCO	Morrice	5	0	1	0	4	0
	FW	(Scotland) SCO	Alexander Gillies	4	1	1	1	3	0
	FW	(Scotland) SCO	Robert Hendry	1	0	0	0	1	0
	FW	(Scotland) SCO	James Littlejohn	4	5	0	0	4	5
	FW	(Scotland) SCO	Lewis Mackie	5	0	1	0	4	0
	FW	(Scotland) SCO	John Millar	5	4	1	0	4	4
	FW	(Scotland) SCO	Willie Speedie	5	6	1	0	4	6
	FW	(Scotland) SCO	Thomas Wingate	1	0	1	0	0	0

== Reserve team ==
Dumbarton lost in the second round of the Scottish Second XI Cup to Rangers.
