= 1874–75 Dumbarton F.C. season =

Dumbarton
1874–75 season
- Stadium: Meadow Park
- Scottish Cup: Semi-final
Home colours

The 1874–75 season was the second season of competitive football by Dumbarton.

== Scottish Cup ==
Dumbarton reached the semi-final of the Scottish Cup before losing to local rivals Renton, after a protested match and a 1-1 draw.

The second round of the Scottish Cup pitted Dumbarton against Rangers for their first ever meeting, and this remains the oldest competitive tie between Dumbarton and any of the current Scottish league clubs.

Date	Round	Opponents	H / A	Result F–A	Scorers	Attendance
17 October 1874	First round	Arthurlie	H	3–0		
28 November 1874	Second round	Rangers	A	0–0		
12 December 1874	Second round replay	Rangers	H	1–0	Lang	
30 January 1875	Quarter-final	3rd Lanark RV	H	1–0		
6 March 1875	Semi-final	Renton	H	0–1 (protested) (Note: A protest from Renton over a disputed goal was upheld and a replay was ordered.)		
27 March 1875	Semi-final	Renton	A	1–1	Galbraith	
3 April 1875	Semi-final replay	Renton	H	0–1		

== Friendlies ==
During the season, five 'friendly' matches were reported to have been played, including home and away fixtures against neighbours Vale of Leven. In addition, a match was played against Dumbarton Cricket and Football Club - who would later change their name to Lennox. Of these matches, three were drawn and two lost, scoring one goal and conceding five.

Date	Opponents	H / A	Result F–A	Scorers	Attendance
21 November 1874	Alexandra Athletic	A	1–1	Unknown	
5 December 1874	Renton	H	0–1		
16 January 1875	Dumbarton Cricket and Football Club	A	0–0		500
23 January 1875	Vale of Leven	A	0–3		
27 February 1875	Vale of Leven	H	0–0		

== Player statistics ==
Amongst those making their first appearances for the club this season was Archie Lang. Of those playing their final game in Dumbarton 'colours', Robert Ball was of note being the player who scored Dumbarton's first ever goal.

Only includes appearances and goals in competitive Scottish Cup matches.

Player	Position	Appearances	Goals
(Scotland) John Wood	GK	5	0
(Scotland) John Bain	DF	4	0
(Scotland) William McIntosh	DF	6	0
(Scotland) James Wood	DF	4	0
(Scotland) James Boyd	MF	4	0
(Scotland) Archie Lang	MF	2	1
(Scotland) David McAuley	MF	4	0
(Scotland) M Walker	MF	2	0
(Scotland) Alex Galbraith	FW	2	1
(Scotland) Robert Gibson	FW	6	0
(Scotland) David Hartley	FW	6	0
(Scotland) William Hicks	FW	5	0
(Scotland) Robert Johnson	FW	6	0
(Scotland) Samuel McInnes	FW	6	0
(Scotland) William McIntyre	FW	4	0
