= 1875–76 Dumbarton F.C. season =

Dumbarton
1875–76 season
- Stadium: Broomfauld Park, Dumbarton
- Scottish Cup: Semi-final
Home colours

The 1875–76 season was the third Scottish football season in which Dumbarton competed at a national level.

== Scottish Cup ==
The semi-final of the Scottish Cup was reached for the second successive year before losing to 3rd LRV, after two 1-1 draws.

Dumbarton's score is shown first in each case.

Dumbarton in the 1875–76 Scottish Cup
Date	Round	Venue	Opponents	Score	Dumbarton scorers	Att.	Ref.
9 October 1875	First round	Levengrove Park, Dumbarton (A)	Lennox	2–2	Denny, Unknown		
16 October 1875	First round replay	Broomfauld Park, Dumbarton (H)	Lennox	1–0	Galbraith 85'		
6 November 1875	Second round	Broomfauld Park, Dumbarton (H)	Renton Thistle	2–1	Galbraith, McAulay		
27 November 1875	Third round	Broomfauld Park, Dumbarton (H)	Drumpellier	5–1	Boyd, McAulay (2), Meikleham, Anderson		
	Quarter-final			Bye			
8 January 1876	Semi-final	Cathkin Park, Crosshill (A)	3rd Lanark RV	1–1	Hartley		
15 January 1876	Semi-final replay	Broomfauld Park, Dumbarton (H)	3rd Lanark RV	1–1	Anderson 5'	2,500	
22 January 1876	Semi-final second replay	Cathkin Park, Crosshill (A)	3rd Lanark RV	0–3			

== Friendlies ==
During the season, 7 'friendly' matches were reported to have been played, of which 5 were won and 2 drawn, scoring 22 goals and conceding just 3.

Dumbarton friendly matches
Date	Venue	Opponents	Score	Dumbarton scorers	Att.	Ref.
4 September 1875	Broomfauld Park, Dumbarton (H)	Lennox	3–0	McInnes, Meikleham, own goal		
18 September 1875	Broomfauld Park, Dumbarton (H)	Alclutha	1–0	Unknown		
25 September 1875	Ardenconnel Park, Helensburgh (A)	Helensburgh	2–2	Unknown		
23 October 1875	Broomfauld Park, Dumbarton (H)	St Andrew's	6–1	Unknown		
30 October 1875	Broomfauld Park, Dumbarton (H)	Telegraphists	8–0	Unknown		
29 January 1876	Broomfauld Park, Dumbarton (H)	Partick	2–0	Anderson, Boyd		
5 February 1876	Broomfauld Park, Dumbarton (H)	Renton	0–0			

== Player statistics ==
Of note amongst those appearing in club colours for the first time this season was Peter Miller.

Only includes appearances and goals in competitive Scottish Cup matches.

Player	Position	Appearances	Goals
(Scotland) J Baillie	GK	3	0
(Scotland) Fowler	GK	2	0
(Scotland) John Wood	GK	2	0
(Scotland) John Bain	DF	7	0
(Scotland) William McIntosh	DF	4	0
(Scotland) A Michie	DF	3	0
(Scotland) James Wood	DF	2	0
(Scotland) James Boyd	MF	7	1
(Scotland) Robert Johnston	MF	7	0
(Scotland) William Anderson	FW	7	2
(Scotland) Alex Galbraith	FW	7	2
(Scotland) David Hartley	FW	7	1
(Scotland) David McAulay	FW	7	3
(Scotland) James Meikleham	FW	7	1
(Scotland) Peter Miller	FW	1	0
(Scotland) T Munn	FW	4	0

=== Representative game ===
As part of the growth of the sport in Scotland, inter-county matches began to be an established part of the football calendar with the 'cream' of each county being selected to play for their respective counties/cities. One of the earliest was a match played at Hampden Park on 29 April 1876 between Dumbartonshire and Glasgow for the benefit of the Western Infirmary. James Boyd and James Meikleham were selected from Dumbarton to play in the Dumbartonshire team, with Glasgow winning 2–0.
