= 1888–89 Dumbarton F.C. season =

Dumbarton
1888–89 season
- Stadium: Boghead Park, Dumbarton
- Scottish Cup: Semi-final
Home colours

The 1888–89 season was the 16th Scottish football season in which Dumbarton competed at a national level.

== Scottish Cup ==
A successful run in the Scottish Cup brought Dumbarton to their eighth semi final and their first ever meeting with Celtic. On the day however the Glasgow side were to prove too strong and ran out 4–1 winners.

1 September 1888 Cup R1	Dumbarton	13–1	Kirkintilloch Central	Boghead Park
	Lapsley; Chapman; Dewar; Madden; Collins		Goal

Cup R2	Dumbarton	bye

13 October 1888 Cup R3	Motherwell	2–6	Dumbarton	Roman Road Park, Motherwell
	Goal		Goal	Attendance: 3,500

3 November 1888 Cup R4	Dumbarton	9–0	Methlan Park	Boghead Park
	Aitken 10' scrimmage Bell; Keir; Chapman

1 December 1888 Cup R5	Dumbarton	3–1	Mossend Swifts	Boghead Park
	Madden 20'; Dewar; Bell		65'	Referee: Mr Brock

15 December 1888 Cup R5	Dumbarton	2–2	St Mirren	Boghead Park
	Bell 85'		Brown; Johnstone

22 December 1888 Cup R5R	St Mirren	2–2	Dumbarton	Westmarch (stadium)
	Brown 50'; Hannah 86' (o.g.)		Dewar; Lapsley	Attendance: 6,000

29 December 1888 Cup R5R	Dumbarton	3–1	St Mirren	Ibrox Park
	Aitken 43'; Bell		Paterson 87'	Attendance: 7,000

12 January 1889 Cup R6	Dumbarton	1–4	Celtic	Boghead Park
	Madden 87'		Dunbar 4', 66'; Groves 41', 62'	Attendance: 6,000; Referee: J Robertson

=== Dumbartonshire Cup ===
The trophy was lifted for the second time, beating their town rivals Dumbarton Athletic easily in the final.

Second round	Dumbarton	Walkover	Dumbarton Thistle

8 December 1888 Third round	Dumbarton	5–0	Vale of Leven Wanderers	Boghead Park
	Bell; Lapsley Chapman

19 January 1889 Semi Final	Dumbarton	3–1	Vale of Leven	Boghead Park
	Miller; Keir; Chapman		Goal	Attendance: 2,000

9 February 1889 Final	Dumbarton	6–2	Dumbarton Athletic	Millburn Park
	Madden 15'; Lapsley; Bell Mair		Lindsay 20'	Attendance: 4,000; Referee: Mr McLean

=== Greenock Charity Cup ===
An invitation to compete in the Greenock Charity Cup was accepted, but Dumbarton lost out to the hosts Morton in the final.

30 March 1889 First round	Carlton	2–5	Dumbarton	Volunteer Park, Greenock
	Mills		Goal

14 May 1889 Semi Final	1st RRV Greenock	0–10	Dumbarton	Greenock
			Goal	Attendance: 1,000

1 June 1889 Final	Morton	2–0	Dumbarton	Cappielow Park
	Stewart 50'; Scott			Attendance: 3,000; Referee: Mr Rose

=== Friendlies ===
During the season, 28 'friendly' matches were played, including home and away fixtures against Vale of Leven, Dumbarton Athletic and Queen's Park. There were also matches against the current holders of the East of Scotland Shield (Mossend Swifts), the Lanarkshire Cup (Airdrie), the Renfrewshire Cup (St Mirren) and the Stirlingshire Cup (East Stirling), and a 3 match tour of the north of Scotland during the New Year holidays. In England, matches were played against Sunderland and Sunderland Albion, and Dumbarton also gave the Welsh national team a tough work-out in a game at Boghead. In all, 9 matches were won, 7 drawn and 12 lost, scoring goals 74 and conceding 67.

11 August 1888 Friendly	Leith Athletic	4–3	Dumbarton	Hawkhill
	Dewar; Lawrie; Clements; Dewar 80' (o.g.)		Madden 5' scrimmage

18 August 1888 Friendly	Vale of Leven	2–2	Dumbarton	Millburn Park
	McMillan; Rankin 70'		Lindsay 57'; Madden 89'	Attendance: 4,000; Referee: J Crerar

25 August 1888 Friendly	Dumbarton	0–3	Queen's Park	Boghead Park
			Berry 20', 30', 50'	Attendance: 2,000; Referee: J Crerar

28 August 1888 Friendly	Dumbarton	4–0	Union (Dumbarton)	Boghead Park
	Goal

8 September 1888 Friendly	Dumbarton	2–2	St Mirren	Boghead Park
	McMillan 10'; Lapsley 30'		42'; 70'	Referee: A Holmes

15 September 1888 Friendly	Dumbarton	1–2	Celtic	Boghead Park
	Chapman 52'		McCallum 30', 80'	Attendance: 2,000; Referee: J Holmes

29 September 1888 Friendly	Dumbarton	2–1	Vale of Leven	Boghead Park
	Lapsley 3'; Madden 50'		47'	Referee: Mr Laird

6 October 1888 Friendly	Dumbarton	9–1	Thornliebank	Boghead Park
	Bell; Chapman; Liddell; Lapsley		Goal	Referee: J Inglis

20 October 1888 Friendly	Queen's Park	2–2	Dumbarton	Recreation Grounds, Glasgow
	Eccles; Stewart		Aitken 1' scrimmage 9'	Attendance: 10,000

27 October 1888 Friendly	Dumbarton	3–0	Thistle	Boghead Park
	Lapsley 3'; Bell

10 November 1888 Friendly	Dumbarton Athletic	3–2	Dumbarton	St James' Park, Dumbarton
	Latta 14', 73'; Henderson		scrimmage Aitken	Attendance: 3,000; Referee: A Rose

24 November 1888 Friendly	Dumbarton	1–1	Mossend Swifts	Boghead Park
	Lapsley		Inglis	Referee: Mr Brock

31 December 1888 Friendly	Strathmore (Dundee)	2–2	Dumbarton	Rollo's Pier, Dundee
	Drabbie		5'

1 January 1889 Friendly	Arbroath	2–2	Dumbarton	Gayfield Park
	Petrie; Willock		Keir

2 January 1889 Friendly	Forfar Athletic	3–1	Dumbarton	Station Park, Forfar
	Bowman; Anderson		Madden

2 February 1889 Friendly	Renton	6–1	Dumbarton	Tontine Park
	Campbell 20' McNee		Madden

16 February 1889 Friendly	Hibernian	4–3	Dumbarton	Easter Road
	Coyle; Burns; McGhee		Chapman; Lapsley

2 March 1889 Friendly	Dumbarton	6–1	Dumbarton Athletic	Boghead Park
	Lapsley 1'; Madden 5'; McMillan 10'; Bell; Mair		scrimmage 65'	Attendance: 2,000; Referee: Mr Cochrane

9 March 1889 Friendly	East Stirling	7–1	Dumbarton	Merchiston Park
	McLauchlan 5'; Kirkwood 35', 47'; Dunn 46'		42'

16 March 1889 Friendly	Queen's Park	1–1	Dumbarton	Cathkin Park
	Berry 55'		Madden 20'

21 March 1889 Friendly	Montrose	4–2	Dumbarton	Links Park
	Kay; Keillor 70'		Bell	Attendance: 2,000

23 March 1889 Friendly	Cowlairs	1–2	Dumbarton	Gourlay Park, Glasgow
	Goal		Miller; Chapman

6 April 1889 Friendly	(Wales) Welsh International XI	0–3	Dumbarton	Cathkin Park
			Chapman; Bell; Mair

13 April 1889 Friendly	Hearts	4–2	Dumbarton	Tynecastle Stadium
	Scott; Baird; Jenkinson		scrimmage Madden

20 April 1889 Friendly	(England) Sunderland Albion	2–6	Dumbarton	Blue House Field, Hendon
	Goal		scrimmage 25'; 26' scrimmage 48'; Lapsley; Mair	Attendance: 5,000

27 April 1889 Friendly	Dumbarton	8–0	Dykebar	Boghead Park
	60' 70'; Bell; Mair			Attendance: 2,000

4 May 1889 Friendly	Albion Rovers	4–1	Dumbarton	Meadow Park, Coatbridge
	Baird; Rourke 15'; Scott 75'		Mair 5'

21 May 1889 Friendly	Airdrie	1–3	Dumbarton	Smiths Fields, Airdrie
	Mitchell		McLeod 10'; Stewart 44'; Lapsley

27 May 1889 Friendly	(England) Sunderland	4–3	Dumbarton	Newcastle Road
	Goal		Chapman 6'	Attendance: 4,000

== Player statistics ==
Dumbarton continued to attract some of the best players in Scotland, and joining up this season were Dickie Boyle and Geordie Dewar.
Amongst those leaving was internationalist Peter Miller after a career with the club spanning over 13 seasons.

Only includes appearances and goals in competitive Scottish Cup matches.

Player	Position	Appearances	Goals
(Scotland) James Bell	GK	8	0
(Scotland) Dickie Boyle	DF	2	0
(Scotland) John Hannah	DF	8	0
(Scotland) Duncan Stewart	DF	5	0
(Scotland) Geordie Dewar	MF	8	4
(Scotland) Robert Hannah	MF	1	0
(Scotland) Leitch Keir	MF	7	1
(Scotland) Tom McMillan	MF	8	0
(Scotland) Ralph Aitken	FW	6	3
(Scotland) Jack Bell	FW	7	7
(Scotland) John Chapman	FW	8	4
(Scotland) James Collins	FW	1	0
(Scotland) Edward Duffy	FW	1	0
(Scotland) William Lapsley	FW	8	7
(Scotland) John Madden	FW	8	3
(Scotland) Alex Miller	FW	2	0

=== International caps ===
An international trial match was played on 16 February 1889 to consider selection of teams to represent Scotland in the upcoming games in the 1889 British Home Championship.

Geordie Dewar was selected to take part and subsequently earned his second cap against England.

=== Representative matches ===
Dumbarton players were selected to play in Dumbartonshire county matches as follows:

Date	Opponent	Result	Players (Goals)
26 January 1889	East of Scotland	4–2	Bell, Jas; Bell, Jn; Dewar; Stewart
26 January 1889	Renfrewshire	6–1	Aitken; Madden (3); McMillan
23 February 1889	Birmingham & District	2–5	Bell; Dewar; Madden (1); McMillan (1):Stewart
25 February 1889	Liverpool District	1–2	Bell (1); Dewar; Madden; McMillan; Stewart
9 April 1889	Scottish International XI	1–2	Bell (D); Madden (D); McMillan (D):Stewart (I)*

- – 'D' played for Dumbartonshire; 'I' played for Internationals

In addition Geordie Dewar was selected to play for a 'Counties' team against a Glasgow Select on 4 October 1888 – Glasgow won 9–0.

== Reserve team ==
Dumbarton lost in the second round of the Scottish Second XI Cup to Linthouse, but in the Dumbartonshire Second XI Cup, the trophy was won for the first time by beating Vale of Leven in the final.
