= 1930–31 Dumbarton F.C. season =

Dumbarton
1930–1931 season
- Manager: Donald Colman
- Stadium: Boghead Park, Dumbarton
- Scottish League Division Two: 10th
- Scottish Cup: First Round
- Top goalscorer: League: Willie Parlane (22); All: Willie Parlane (22)

The 1930–31 season was the 54th Scottish football season in which Dumbarton competed at national level, entering the Scottish Football League and the Scottish Cup. In addition Dumbarton competed in the Dumbartonshire Cup.

== Scottish League ==
In their ninth consecutive season in the Second Division, things were looking bright for Dumbarton's league challenge, as at the turn of the year they were lying only a point behind a promotion place. However a run of 5 straight defeats in January 1931 snuffed out these hopes and in the end Dumbarton finished a midtable 10th out of 20, with 38 points - 23 behind champions Third Lanark.

9 August 1930 League	Forfar Athletic	3–0	Dumbarton	Station Park, Forfar
	Kilgour 1' (pen.); Black 30', 75'			Attendance: 1,500; Referee: H McLaughlin

16 August 1930 League	Dumbarton	3–1	Raith Rovers	Boghead Park
	Shaw 14', 85'; Parlane, W 19'		Galloway 33'	Attendance: 1,200; Referee: H McArthur

23 August 1930 League	Third Lanark	1–0	Dumbarton	Cathkin Park
	Breslin 61'			Referee: C McGreachan

30 August 1930 League	Dumbarton	3–2	St Johnstone	Boghead Park
	Haddow 15'; Parlane, W 38', 55'		Munro 33', 72'	Attendance: 2,000; Referee: J Rowe

6 September 1930 League	Armadale	3–4	Dumbarton	Volunteer Park, Armadale
	Polland, J 10' 23'; Russell 20' (pen.)		Cameron 8'; Shaw 28'; Parlane, W 52'; Parlane, J 90'	Referee: J Coll

13 September 1930 League	Dumbarton	4–1	Montrose	Boghead Park
	Parlane, W 2', 80'; Malloy 13', 30'		Scoullar 20' (pen.)	Attendance: 3,000; Referee: R Seith

20 September 1930 League	Clydebank	1–4	Dumbarton	Clydeholm Park
	McLeod 55'		Malloy 2'; Parlane, W	Referee: J Leggatt

27 September 1930 League	Dumbarton	5–0	East Stirling	Boghead Park
	Parlane, J 4'; Malloy 44'; Parlane, W 48', 49'; Haddow			Attendance: 3,000; Referee: T Kilbride

4 October 1930 League	Stenhousemuir	3–3	Dumbarton	Ochilview Park
	Walker 43', 77'; Brown 75'		Parlane, W 14'; Murdoch 16' (o.g.); Haddow 54'	Referee: W Whiteside

11 October 1930 League	Dumbarton	1–0	Alloa Athletic	Boghead Park
	Parlane, W 10'			Attendance: 4,000; Referee: G Robertson

18 October 1930 League	Dumbarton	3–1	Bo'ness	Boghead Park
	Haddow 25'; Parlane, J 55'; Parlane, W 78'		Parlane, A 52' (o.g.)	Attendance: 2,000; Referee: J Leggatt

25 October 1930 League	Arbroath	3–1	Dumbarton	Gayfield Park
	McAteer 48', 61'; Flannigan 83'		Parlane, J 20'	Attendance: 2,500; Referee: J Grant

1 November 1930 League	Dumbarton	4–1	Dundee United	Boghead Park
	Parlane, W 16', 58', 81'; Shaw 26'		McCallum 5'	Attendance: 3,000; Referee: J Leggatt

8 November 1930 League	Dunfermline Athletic	2–1	Dumbarton	East End Park
	Hamilton 47'; Rarity, W 54'		Parlane, J 20'	Attendance: 4,000; Referee: H McArthur

15 November 1930 League	Queen of the South	3–0	Dumbarton	Palmerston Park
	McDonald 6'; Rutherford 45'; McColl 80'			Referee: J McKay

29 November 1930 League	Dumbarton	1–0	Albion Rovers	Boghead Park
	Lennie 35'			Attendance: 3,000; Referee: A McLean

6 December 1930 League	St Bernard's	2–2	Dumbarton	Royal Gymnasium Ground
	Sweeney; Eadie 60'		Parlane, J 70'; Barrie 87'	Referee: G McCutcheon

13 December 1930 League	Dumbarton	3–2	King's Park	Boghead Park
	Haddow 20' (pen.); McNiven 22'; Parlane, W 85'		Jamieson 37', 60'	Attendance: 3,000; Referee: W Jamieson

20 December 1930 League	Dumbarton	2–2	Forfar Athletic	Boghead Park
	Malloy 25' (pen.); Parlane, W 75'		Bathgate 12'; Black 70'	Attendance: 2,500; Referee: A Robertson

27 December 1930 League	Raith Rovers	2–0	Dumbarton	Starks Park
	Jarvis 47'; Junior 75'			Attendance: 2,000; Referee: R Cooper

1 January 1931 League	Dumbarton	0–2	Clydebank	Boghead Park
			Thomson 18', 40'	Attendance: 3,000

3 January 1931 League	Dumbarton	2–4	Third Lanark	Boghead Park
	Haddow (pen.); Shaw		Dewar; McFarlane; McNiven (o.g.); Lynas 85'	Attendance: 4,500; Referee: J Leggatt

5 January 1931 League	East Stirling	7–1	Dumbarton	Firs Park
	Turnbull 5'; Latimer 30', 42'; Renwick; McMillan 65'; Fraser 68' (pen.)		Lennie 85'	Referee: R Seith

10 January 1931 League	St Johnstone	4–1	Dumbarton	Muirton Park
	Cameron 4', 64'; Miller 5'		Haddow 69'	Attendance: 5,000; Referee: J Rowan

24 January 1931 League	Dumbarton	6–2	Armadale	Boghead Park
	Parlane, W 20'; Parlane, J 25'; Lennie 37'; Malloy 50'; Findlay 55' (o.g.); Haddow		Stout 6'; McDonald 21'	Attendance: 2,500; Referee: G McCutcheon

31 January 1931 League	Dumbarton	0–0	Dunfermline Athletic	Boghead Park
				Referee: W Smith

7 February 1931 League	Dumbarton	4–1	Stenhousemuir	Boghead Park
	Parlane, W 32'; Haddow 55'; Malloy		Jessieman (pen.)	Attendance: 2,000; Referee: J Burdon

14 February 1931 League	Alloa Athletic	2–0	Dumbarton	Recreation Park, Alloa
	Borland 10'; Shankley			Referee: A McLean

21 February 1931 League	Bo'ness	4–4	Dumbarton	Newtown Park, Bo'ness
	Heeps; Lumsden		Parlane, W Haddow; McNiven 49'; Parlane, J	Attendance: 1,200; Referee: W Dawson

28 February 1931 League	Dumbarton	3–1	Arbroath	Boghead Park
	Haddow 4'; Young 53', 65'		Farquhar 75'	Attendance: 2,000; Referee: W Murray

7 March 1931 League	Dundee United	1–1	Dumbarton	Tannadice Park
	Hay 80'		Parlane, J 75'	Attendance: 3,000; Referee: W Whiteside

21 March 1931 League	Dumbarton	1–2	Queen of the South	Boghead Park
	Shaw		Rutherford 20'; Macdonald	Attendance: 2,500; Referee: P Kilbride

28 March 1931 League	Montrose	2–1	Dumbarton	Links Park
	Junior 3'; McKnight		Parlane, W	Attendance: 1,000; Referee: J Leggatt

4 April 1931 League	Brechin City	2–2	Dumbarton	Glebe Park, Brechin
	Moffat 22'; Boag 90'		Malloy 46'; Parlane, W 80'	Referee: W Whitside

11 April 1931 League	Albion Rovers	1–1	Dumbarton	Cliftonhill
	Fraser 50'		Malloy 75'	Referee: J Robertson

13 April 1931 League	Dumbarton	0–1	Brechin City	Boghead Park
			Cowley 81'	Attendance: 1,000; Referee: J Burdon

18 April 1931 League	Dumbarton	0–3	St Bernard's	Boghead Park
			Robertson; Walls 65', 70'	Referee: C McGreachan

25 April 1931 League	King's Park	0–2	Dumbarton	Forthbank Park
			Young 11'; Malloy	Attendance: 1,000; Referee: A McLean

== Scottish Cup ==
Dumbarton were knocked out in the first round by Aberdeen.

17 January 1931 Cup R1	Aberdeen	6–1	Dumbarton	Pittodrie Park
	Yorston 23', 32'; McLean 35'; Love (pen.); McDermid		Shaw	Attendance: 10,570; Referee: W Quinn

== Dumbartonshire Cup ==
Dumbarton retained the Dumbartonshire Cup, again beating Clydebank in the final, with Willie Parlane scoring all five goals.

22 April 1931 Final	Dumbarton	5–0	Clydebank	Boghead Park
	Parlane.W			Attendance: 1,000

== Friendlies ==
Elsewhere 3 friendly matches were played, including a match against a Rangers XI and two trial matches for the Dumbartonshire Juniors. Of these matches, there was 1 win and 2 losses, scoring 4 goals for the loss of 4.

12 August 1930 Friendly	Dumbarton	1–3	Rangers	Boghead Park
	Malloy 81'		McGowan 18'; McMillan 20'	Attendance: 3,000

9 September 1930 Friendly	Dumbarton	1–2	Dumbartonshire Junior XI	Boghead Park
	Halliday		Gallacher; Malloy	Attendance: 600

29 April 1931 Friendly	Dumbarton	4–0	Dumbartonshire Junior XI	Boghead Park
	Parlane, J McLachlan; Kelso

== Player statistics ==
No.	Pos	Nat	Player	Total		Second Division		Scottish Cup	
No.	Pos	Nat	Player	Apps	Goals	Apps	Goals	Apps	Goals
	GK	(Scotland) SCO	Alex Fraser	4	0	4	0	0	0
	GK	(Scotland) SCO	William Gilmour	35	0	34	0	1	0
	DF	(Scotland) SCO	Jim Kelso	39	0	38	0	1	0
	DF	(Scotland) SCO	Alex Parlane	23	0	23	0	0	0
	DF	(Scotland) SCO	Daniel Muir	24	0	23	0	1	0
	MF	(Scotland) SCO	Adair	1	0	1	0	0	0
	MF	(Scotland) SCO	William Barrie	4	1	4	1	0	0
	MF	(Scotland) SCO	Thomas Cameron	20	1	19	1	1	0
	MF	(Scotland) SCO	Clark	1	0	1	0	0	0
	MF	(Scotland) SCO	Johnny Granger	10	0	10	0	0	0
	MF	(Scotland) SCO	Stewart Lennie	25	3	24	3	1	0
	MF	(Scotland) SCO	Charles McLurg	2	0	2	0	0	0
	MF	(Scotland) SCO	James McNeish	8	0	8	0	0	0
	MF	(Scotland) SCO	John McNiven	19	2	18	2	1	0
	MF	(Scotland) SCO	James Miller	2	0	2	0	0	0
	MF	(Scotland) SCO	Johnny Parlane	32	8	31	8	1	0
	MF	(Scotland) SCO	Thomas Pye	4	0	4	0	0	0
	MF	(Scotland) SCO	James Stewart	8	0	8	0	0	0
	MF	(Scotland) SCO	Wilson	3	0	3	0	0	0
	MF	(Scotland) SCO	Trialists	3	0	3	0	0	0
	FW	(Scotland) SCO	Forbes	1	0	1	0	0	0
	FW	(Scotland) SCO	Johnny Haddow	35	13	34	13	1	0
	FW	(Scotland) SCO	Hurrell	1	0	1	0	0	0
	FW	(Scotland) SCO	Alistair McLachlan	5	0	5	0	0	0
	FW	(England) ENG	William Molloy	38	12	37	12	1	0
	FW	(Scotland) SCO	Willie Parlane	37	22	36	22	1	0
	FW	(Scotland) SCO	Sharp	1	0	1	0	0	0
	FW	(Scotland) SCO	Norman Shaw	28	7	27	6	1	1
	FW	(Scotland) SCO	Benjamin Swanson	5	0	5	0	0	0
	FW	(Scotland) SCO	Andrew Young	11	3	11	3	0	0

=== International Caps ===
Stewart Lennie and Willie Parlane earned their first amateur caps playing for Scotland against Wales and England respectively in the Amateur Home Internationals.

=== Transfers ===
==== Players in ====
Player	From	Date
(Scotland) William Gilmour	(Scotland) Clydebank	12 Aug 1930
(Scotland) Thomas Cameron	(Scotland) Croy Celtic	28 Aug 1930
(Scotland) Alistair McLachlan	(Scotland) Amateur	2 Sep 1930
(Scotland) Alex Parlane	(Scotland) Amateur	2 Sep 1930
(Scotland) Andrew Young	(Scotland) Clyde	20 Feb 1931
(Scotland) James McNish	(Scotland) Maryhill Hibs	26 Feb 1931
(Scotland) Thomas Pye	(Scotland) Dunblane Rovers	16 Apr 1931
(Scotland) William Barrie	(Scotland) Arthurlie	

==== Players out ====
Player	To	Date
(Scotland) James Miller	(Wales) Swansea City	13 Jun 1930
(Scotland) James Brannan	(Scotland) Bo'ness	21 Jun 1930
(Scotland) James Warden	(Scotland) Third Lanark	7 Aug 1930
(Scotland) Archibald McNish	(Scotland) Freed	30 Oct 1930
(Scotland) James Stewart	(Scotland) Freed	5 Dec 1930
(Scotland) Alex Fraser	(Scotland) Bo'ness	19 Dec 1930
(Scotland) Benjamin Swanson	(Scotland) Freed	25 Jan 1931
(Scotland) Thomas Cameron	(Scotland) Freed	5 Feb 1931
(Scotland) Robert Speedie	(Scotland) King's Park	

In addition William Hyslop, William Kirk, William Livingston and Archibald McLardie all played their last games in Dumbarton 'colours'.
