= 1899–1900 Dumbarton F.C. season =

Dumbarton
1899–1900 season
- Stadium: Boghead Park, Dumbarton
Home colours

The 1899–1900 season was the 27th Scottish football season in which Dumbarton competed at national level entering the Scottish Qualifying Cup. In addition Dumbarton played in the Dumbartonshire Cup.

== Scottish Qualifying Cup ==
In their only 'national' competition, Dumbarton were knocked out in the second round of the Scottish Qualifying Cup by Vale of Leven and thus failed to qualify to play in the Scottish Cup for the first time since its inception.

9 September 1899 QualifyCup R1	Renton	1–2	Dumbarton	Tontine Park
	Goal		Johnstone; Stevenson 45'

14 October 1899 QualifyCup R2	Vale of Leven	4–1	Dumbarton	Millburn Park
	Johnstone 3'		Campbell 13'	Attendance: 3,000

== Dumbartonshire Cup ==
Locally, the Dumbartonshire Cup was played on a league basis for the first time with the top two meeting in the final. All competing teams finished on 6 points but Dumbarton ended up in third position on goal difference.

23 September 1899 League	Dumbarton	4–5	Clydebank	Boghead Park
	Goal		Goal

25 October 1899 League	Dumbarton	3–2	Renton	Boghead Park
	Goal		Goal

18 November 1899 League	Clydebank	0–0	Dumbarton	Hamilton Park, Clydebank
				Referee: Mr Jeff

2 December 1899 League	Dumbarton	2–1	Vale of Leven	Boghead Park
	Goal		Goal

13 January 1900 League	Vale of Leven	3–1	Dumbarton	Millburn Park
	Goal		Goal

27 January 1900 League	Renton	1–1	Dumbarton	Tontine Park
	Goal		Goal

=== Final league table ===
Pos	Team	Pld	W	D	L	GF	GA	GD	Pts
1	Vale of Leven	6	2	2	2	15	9	+6	6
2	Renton	6	2	2	2	13	12	+1	6
3	Dumbarton	6	2	2	2	11	12	−1	6
4	Clydebank	6	2	2	2	14	20	−6	6

== Friendlies ==
For the third season running there were no league fixtures, and attractive 'friendlies' were becoming more difficult to arrange.

A dwindling fixture list saw only 11 'friendly' matches played during the season, although this included a creditable draw against Celtic and a match against Aberdeen which celebrated the opening of Pittodrie Park. In all 4 were won, 1 drawn and 6 lost, scoring 23 goals and conceding 34.

16 August 1899 Friendly	Clydebank	3–1	Dumbarton	Hamilton Park, Clydebank
	Goal		Goal

19 August 1899 Friendly	King's Park	1–4	Dumbarton	Springkerse Park, Stirling
	McNeil		10'	Referee: Mr Gorman

26 August 1899 Friendly	Dumfries	2–3	Dumbarton	Creswell Park, Dumfries
	Goal		Morley; Kennedy

30 August 1899 Friendly	Dumbarton	2–2	Celtic	Boghead Park
	Millar; 80' (pen.)		90'	Attendance: 2,000

2 September 1899 Friendly	Aberdeen	7–1	Dumbarton	Pittodrie Stadium
	Shiach; Fullerton; Gray (o.g.)		Millar	Referee: J Phillips

7 October 1899 Friendly	Dumbarton	2–3	Queen's Park	Boghead Park
	Fullarton; Johnston		Wilson	Referee: Mr Quairns

4 November 1899 Friendly	Falkirk	1–2	Dumbarton	Brockville Park
	Drummond		Campbell; McKinnie	Attendance: 1,000; Referee: Mr Murray

25 November 1899 Friendly	Port Glasgow	2–1	Dumbarton	Clune Park
	Smith; McCabe		Fullarton	Attendance: 800

30 December 1899 Friendly	Queen's Park	8–2	Dumbarton	Hampden Park
	McColl; Kennedy; Hay; Stewart		Millar; Reid

17 March 1900 Friendly	Dumbarton	2–1	Linthouse	Boghead Park
	Fullarton; Richmond, A		Pearson	Referee: Mr Drummond

31 March 1900 Friendly	E Stirling	4–3	Dumbarton	Merchiston Park
	Harper 59'; Alexander 50'; Hastings		Millar; Fullarton; Hosie	Referee: Mr Thomson

== Player statistics ==
No.	Pos	Nat	Player	Total		Qualifying Cup	
No.	Pos	Nat	Player	Apps	Goals	Apps	Goals
	GK	(Scotland) SCO	G Millar	2	0	2	0
	DF	(Scotland) SCO	John McKinlay	2	0	2	0
	DF	(Scotland) SCO	Henry Mitchell	2	0	2	0
	MF	(Scotland) SCO	John Gillan	1	0	1	0
	MF	(Scotland) SCO	Howie	2	0	2	0
	MF	(Scotland) SCO	James Richmond	2	0	2	0
	MF	(Scotland) SCO	Daniel Thomson	2	0	2	0
	FW	(Scotland) SCO	Billy Andrews	1	0	1	0
	FW	(Scotland) SCO	William Campbell	2	1	2	1
	FW	(Scotland) SCO	Fullarton	1	0	1	0
	FW	(Scotland) SCO	Johnston	1	1	1	1
	FW	(Scotland) SCO	R B Johnston	2	0	2	0
	FW	(Scotland) SCO	John Millar	1	0	1	0
	FW	(Scotland) SCO	James Stevenson	1	1	1	1

== Reserve team ==
Dumbarton lost in the first round of the Scottish Second XI Cup to Queen's Park.
