= Robert Gordon (Scottish footballer) =

Scottish footballer

Personal information
- Full name: Robert Gordon

Senior career*
Years	Team	Apps	(Gls)
1905–1911	Dumbarton	95	(8)
- * Club domestic league appearances and goals

Robert 'Bob' Gordon was a Scottish football player, who played for Dumbarton during the 1900s.
