= Star of Leven F.C. =

Association football club in Dunbartonshire, Scotland

Star of Leven
- Full name: Star of Leven Football Club
- Nickname(s): the Juniors
- Founded: 1873
- Dissolved: 1882
- Ground: Bridge Street
- Secretary: Alexander Campbell
Home colours

Star of Leven Football Club was an association football club based in the town of Alexandria, in the Vale of Leven area of West Dunbartonshire.

== History ==
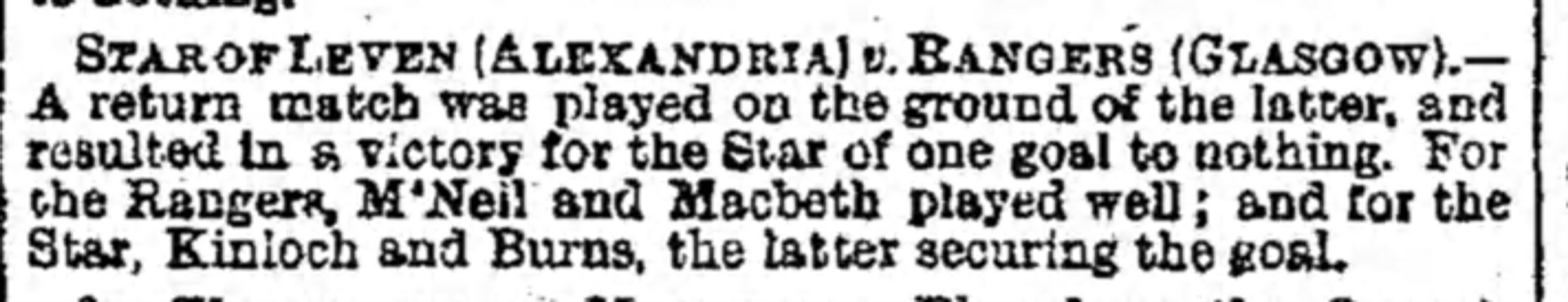
Rangers 0–1 Star of Leven, 1873–74 season, Glasgow Herald 28 April 1874

The club was founded in 1873, in the wake of other clubs in the West Dunbartonshire area such as Vale of Leven F.C., Renton F.C., and Dumbarton F.C. Unlike the more successful clubs in the area, the club did not have any backing from local factories, and remained wholly amateur. One of the club's earliest matches was a 1–0 win over Rangers F.C.

At the start of the 1874–75 season, one of the club's players, 19-year old Robert Atherley, a shoemaker in Alexandria, died of a ruptured stomach, after receiving a kick in a match against the Lily club of Renton.

The club entered the Scottish Cup for the first time in 1874–75, losing to Glasgow club West End in the first round. With the success of the other clubs in the area, Star remained a minnow in the game, and only won one Cup tie in the first phase of its existence - against the 10th Dumbartonshire Rifle Volunteers F.C. in 1876–77. In 1877–78, the club walked off the pitch after a second goal was given against it in a repeat first round tie with the 10th D.R.V., and in 1878–79, the club was drawn to play Renton, scratching rather than playing out a likely heavy defeat.

By 1879, the club was defunct; the club had lost players to other clubs in the area and never had enough playing members to form a reserve side. However, a number of teenage players, under the leadership of Johnny Forbes, had formed a juvenile club which they named Star of Leven Juniors, as the Star gave them spare footballs with which to play, and, as Star had entered the Scottish Cup for 1879–80 before its demise, they decided to submit a team. In the first round, the club was drawn to play Jamestown, and lost after a series of controversial refereeing decisions from Robert Paton, a Vale of Leven player. The Star protested on the basis that Paton was a member of the Jamestown club, but the protest was dismissed after Paton gave evidence that he was not a member.

Jamestown reached the third round, by which time it was the only Levenside club remaining in the competition, Vale of Leven having lost to Dumbarton in the first round. Paton (as well as three other Vale players) was not Cup-tied so played for Jamestown in its third round win over Lennox. This however meant that Lennox protested on the basis that the four Vale players were not bona fide members of the Jamestown club - and after the Scottish FA committee heard the evidence, it decided that Paton had indeed been a member of Jamestown before the first round, and so ineligible to referee the Jamestown-Star tie. It therefore disqualified Jamestown and re-instated Star, who lost to Kirkintilloch Athletic (which was the 10th D.R.V. under a new name) in the second round.

By the end of the 1879–80 season, Forbes had joined Vale of Leven, and the club struggled on for two more seasons. Star gained another win in the Scottish Cup by beating Kirkintilloch Athletic in the first round in 1880–81. The club was finally struck off the Scottish FA register in 1882. A junior club of the same name started up soon after but only lasted for a brief period.

== Colours ==
The club's colours were red shirts, white shorts, and blue and white hose.

== Ground ==
The club generally played on an unenclosed public park on Bridge Street. Star did play at least one match on a field provided by a Mr Turnbull of Bonhill Place.

== Notable players ==
- Johnny Forbes, later a Scottish international and an FA Cup winner with Blackburn Rovers.
