= 1930–31 Scottish Division Two =

Scottish Second Division
- Season: 1930–31
- Champions: Third Lanark
- Promoted: Third Lanark; Dundee United

The 1930–31 Scottish Second Division was won by Third Lanark who, along with second placed Dundee United, were promoted to the First Division. Bo'ness finished bottom.

== Table ==
Pos	Team	Pld	W	D	L	GF	GA	GD	Pts	Promotion or relegation
1	Third Lanark	38	27	7	4	107	42	+65	61	Promotion to the 1931–32 First Division
2	Dundee United	38	21	8	9	93	54	+39	50	Promotion to the 1931–32 First Division
3	Dunfermline Athletic	38	20	7	11	83	50	+33	47	
4	Raith Rovers	38	20	6	12	93	72	+21	46	
5	St Johnstone	38	19	6	13	76	61	+15	44	
6	Queen of the South	38	18	6	14	83	66	+17	42	
7	East Stirlingshire	38	17	7	14	85	74	+11	41	
8	Montrose	38	19	3	16	75	90	−15	41	
9	Albion Rovers	38	14	11	13	83	84	−1	39	
10	Dumbarton	38	15	8	15	73	72	+1	38	
11	St Bernard's	38	14	9	15	85	66	+19	37	
12	Forfar Athletic	38	15	6	17	80	84	−4	36	
13	Alloa Athletic	38	15	5	18	65	87	−22	35	
14	King's Park	38	14	6	18	78	70	+8	34	
15	Arbroath	38	15	4	19	83	94	−11	34	
16	Brechin City	38	13	7	18	52	84	−32	33	
17	Stenhousemuir	38	12	6	20	75	101	−26	30	
18	Armadale	38	13	2	23	74	99	−25	28	
19	Clydebank	38	10	2	26	61	108	−47	22	Left the League
20	Bo'ness	38	9	4	25	54	100	−46	22	
