= 1873–74 Dumbarton F.C. season =

Dumbarton
1873–74 season
- Stadium: Meadow Park
- Scottish Cup: Second Round
Home colours

The 1873–74 season was the first season of competitive football by Dumbarton.

== Scottish Cup ==
Dumbarton became members of the fledgeling Scottish FA and contributed to the purchase of a challenge cup. In this inaugural Scottish Cup competition, the club reached the second round, following a walk-over against Vale of Leven in the first round with a 1–0 defeat against Renton in the second round replay, after a 0-0 draw.

=== Scottish Cup ===
Date	Round	Opponents	H / A	Result F–A	Scorers	Attendance
October 1873	First round	Vale of Leven	Walkover			
22 November 1873	Quarter-final	Renton	H	0–0		
18 October 1873	Quarter-final replay	Renton	A	0–1		

== Friendlies ==
During the season, reports were made of the playing of six 'friendly' matches, including home and away fixtures against local rivals Vale of Leven and Glasgow side, Callander. Of these matches, two were won, one drawn and three lost, scoring three goals and conceding nine.

Date	Opponents	H / A	Result F–A	Scorers	Attendance
20 September 1873	Callander	A	1–0	Ball	
25 October 1873	Vale of Leven	H	0–3		1,000
1 November 1873	Blythswood	A	0–1		
8 November 1873	Callander	H	1–1	McInnes	
15 November 1873	Vale of Leven	A	0–4		
31 January 1874	Granville	H	1–0	McAulay	

== Player statistics ==
Only includes appearances and goals in competitive Scottish Cup matches.

Player	Position	Appearances	Goals
(Scotland) Colquhoun	GK	2	0
(Scotland) A McIntosh	DF	2	0
(Scotland) William McIntosh	DF	2	0
(Scotland) Robert Ball	MF	1	0
(Scotland) Findlay Kennedy	MF	2	0
(Scotland) Neil Douglas	FW	2	0
(Scotland) Robert Gibson	FW	2	0
(Scotland) William Hicks	FW	1	0
(Scotland) David McAulay	FW	2	0
(Scotland) Samuel McInnes	FW	2	0
(Scotland) William McIntyre	FW	2	0
(Scotland) G Reid	FW	2	0
