= William Thomson (Dumbarton footballer) =

Scottish footballer

Personal information
- Full name: William Thomson
- Date of birth: 4 May 1868
- Place of birth: Cardross, Scotland
- Positions: Inside forward; centre half

Senior career*
Years	Team	Apps	(Gls)
1889–1893	Dumbarton	31	(8)
1893	Aston Villa	0	(0)
1893–1894	Newton Heath	3	(0)
1894–1898	Dumbarton	24	(3)
1898–1901	Clyde	25	(1)

International career
1892–1898	Scotland	4	(1)
1895	Scottish League XI	1	(0)
- * Club domestic league appearances and goals

William Thomson (born 4 May 1868) was a Scottish footballer of the 1890s.

== Career ==
Thomson played for Dumbarton (two spells), Aston Villa, Newton Heath and Clyde. He also played internationally for Scotland between 1892 and 1898.

== Honours ==
Dumbarton

- Scottish League: Champions 1891–92
- Scottish Cup: Runner-Up 1896–97
- Dumbartonshire Cup: Winners 1890–91, 1891–92, 1892–93
- 4 caps for Scotland between 1892 and 1898, scoring one goal
- 1 cap for the Scottish League in 1895
- 2 representative caps for Dunbartonshire between 1892 and 1898
- 1 international trial for Scotland in 1892

== Personal life ==
Thomson emigrated to Australia in approximately 1910, eventually settling in Drummoyne, Sydney.
