= Lennox F.C. (Scotland) =

Association football club in Dumbarton, Scotland

Lennox
- Full name: Lennox Football Club
- Founded: 1873
- Dissolved: 1882
- Ground: Levengrove Park
- Hon. President: Cllr. John Denny
- Hon. Secretary: James Sword
- Match secretary: William Jardine Jr
1873–77 colours	1877–82 colours

Lennox Football Club was a 19th-century football club based in Dumbarton, in Scotland.

== History ==
The club was founded in 1873, and by 1876 had 57 members, 20 more than the local rivals Dumbarton had at the same stage; however, unlike Dumbarton, Lennox was not backed by a local industrial concern, club secretary Joseph Jenkins being a lawyer's clerk. The clubs met in Lennox' first Scottish Cup tie in 1875–76 and Dumbarton won 1–0 in a replay, thanks to a goal in the last five minutes from a Galbraith shot; Lennox protested against the goal on the basis of offside, and even left the pitch rather than play out the full time, but the Scottish Football Association dismissed the protest the following week. The original tie at Levengrove had ended 2–2, Lennox losing a two-goal lead in the final 15 minutes. A 3–1 win over a strong Rangers XI in March 1876 led to the Lennox being considered one of the "first clubs, and certainly one of the most rising clubs" in Scotland.

Lennox' second entry the next season was its most successful, and the club reached the quarter-finals, which, given the uneven nature of the regional early rounds, was made up of 6 clubs. The club gained revenge over Dumbarton in the third round, despite the Sons disputing the Lennox winner, and, by the time it went to Edinburgh Swifts in the fourth, had only conceded 2 goals all season. Despite having to play the second half with ten men through injury, Lennox won 4–0, with two goals per half; full-back Kennedy - whose corner led to the first goal - was particularly praised for his play. The run came to an end at home to Rangers, Lennox going down by 3 goals, plus one disallowed, to nil, all the goals coming in the second half and being put down to Rangers being a younger side.

In 1877–78 the club gained its record win (9–0 over Milngavie) in the second round, but it was the club's final win in the competition. In the third round, it lost 3–0 at eventual winners Vale of Leven, in front of 2,000 spectators. At the time, the club was the second-biggest in the shire, with 96 members, compared to Jamestown's 80, Dumbarton's 68, and Renton's 50; however Vale of Leven had 264. Lennox was also the first club in the town to host the mighty Queen's Park, in February 1878.

Lennox was the beneficiary of an unusual reprieve in the 1879–80 Scottish Cup. Jamestown beat Lennox in the third round with the help of Vale of Leven player Robert Paton, who was not Cup-tied, and, as the Vale was out of the Cup, was free to represent another side. This however meant that Lennox protested on the basis that the Paton, and three other players Jamestown had "borrowed" from the Vale players were not bona members of the Jamestown club, and, after the Scottish FA committee heard the evidence, it decided that Paton had been a member of Jamestown before the first round - but that meant that he was ineligible to referee Jamestown's first-round tie with the Star of Leven club, which had already been the subject of a dismissed protest. With this new evidence, the Scottish FA annulled Jamestown's first round victory over Star of Leven, and re-instated Star to play in the second round against Jamestown's victims Kirkintilloch Athletic, and Lennox was to play the winner in the third round. The reprieve was short-lived as Kirkintilloch (who beat Star in the second round) beat Lennox 6–2.

The club was still good enough in February 1880 to beat Renton, but before the next season started, many of its players, including James Meikleham, John Kennedy, and captain Robert Lang were playing for Dumbarton, and the club fell away.

Lennox' final match in the competition came in 1880–81. It lost 2–1 to the original Helensburgh club in the first round, but the Scottish FA ordered a replay because of "an irregularity in the appointment of referees". Helensburgh won the replayed tie 8–1. Lennox did not play in the competition again. It entered in 1881–82 but when drawn to play Vale of Leven the club scratched rather than face an inevitable defeat. In January 1882 a storm destroyed the Lennox clubhouse and that seems to have been a fatal blow for the club.

== Colours ==
The club's colours were originally black and white hoops. From 1877 the club's colours were navy and white one-inch hooped jerseys and stockings, with blue knickers.

== Grounds ==
The club played at Levengrove Park, whose surface the club maintained in better condition than any other in the region.
