= Robert Brown (footballer, born 1856) =

Scottish footballer

Personal information
- Full name: Robert Brown
- Date of birth: 1856
- Place of birth: Dumbarton, Scotland
- Date of death: 10 January 1904 (aged 47–48)
- Place of death: Dumbarton, Scotland
- Position: Outside right

Senior career*
Years	Team	Apps	(Gls)
1878–1885	Dumbarton		

International career
1884	Scotland	2	(0)
- * Club domestic league appearances and goals

Robert 'Sparrow' Brown (1856 – 10 January 1904) was a Scottish footballer, who played for Dumbarton and Scotland.

He was one of two contemporary players of the same name and club. To distinguish them, they were given nicknames 'Plumber' and 'Sparrow'.

== Honours ==
Dumbarton

- Scottish Cup: Winners 1882–83
  - Runners Up 1880–81, 1881–82
- Dumbartonshire Cup: Winners 1884–85
- Glasgow Charity Cup: Runners Up 1881–82, 1884–85
- 3 representative caps for Dumbartonshire, scoring one goal
- 3 representative caps for Scotch Counties, scoring two goals.
