= Millburn Park =

Football ground in Alexandria, Scotland

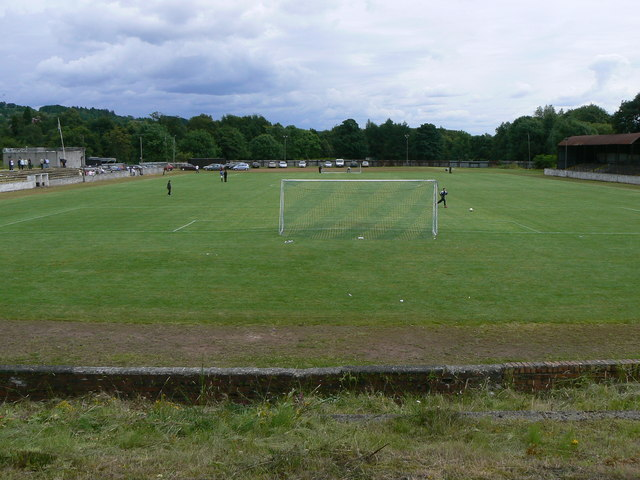

- Location within West Dunbartonshire
- Location: Alexandria, Scotland
- Coordinates: 55.98149°N 4.57794°W
- Surface: Grass
- Record attendance: 8,000

Construction
- Opened: August 1888

Tenant
- Vale of Leven (1888–)

Millburn Park is a football ground in Alexandria, Scotland. It has been the home ground of Vale of Leven since 1888, hosting Scottish Football League matches between 1890 and 1926.

== History ==
Millburn Park was opened in August 1888 when Vale of Leven moved from North Street Park. A grandstand was brought from North Street Park and erected on the eastern side of the pitch, which was surrounded by a cinder track. A covered stand was put up on the western side of the pitch, and a pavilion opened in the south-eastern corner.

Vale of Leven were founder members of the Scottish Football League in 1890, and the first league match was played at Millburn Park on 30 August 1890, with Vale of Leven beating Abercorn 2–1. Although the club left the league in 1892, they were elected into Division Two in 1905. The ground's probable record attendance of 8,000 was set for a Scottish Cup match against Alloa Athletic on 2 February 1922.

Towards the end of the 1925–26 season, Division Three was disbanded; the final Scottish Football League match was played at Millburn Park on 3 April 1926, with Vale of Leven drawing 2–2 with Mid-Annandale. The club was also disbanded a few years later but reformed as a Junior club in 1939, with the reformed club using Millburn Park.
