= Jock Hutcheson =

Scottish footballer

Personal information
- Full name: Jock Hutcheson
- Position: Defender

Senior career*
Years	Team	Apps	(Gls)
1877–1887	Dumbarton		
- * Club domestic league appearances and goals

Jock Hutcheson was a Scottish footballer who played in the 1870s and 1880s. Hutcheson played club football as a defender with Dumbarton where he was to spend the best part of ten seasons.

== Honours ==
Dumbarton

- Scottish Cup: Winners 1882–83
  - Runners-up 1880–81, 1881–82, 1886–87
- Dumbartonshire Cup: Winners 1884–85
- Glasgow Charity Cup: Runners-Up 1881–82, 1884–85
- 3 representative caps for Scotch Counties between 1882 and 1883
- 4 representative caps for Dumbartonshire between 1885 and 1887.
- 4 international trials for the Scotland international team between 1881 and 1884.
