= William McKinnon (footballer, born 1859) =

Scottish footballer

Personal information
- Full name: William Neilson McKinnon
- Date of birth: 6 June 1859
- Place of birth: Bonhill, Scotland
- Date of death: 14 October 1899 (aged 40)
- Place of death: Dumbarton, Scotland
- Position: Forward

Senior career*
| Years | Team | Apps | (Gls) |
| 1877–1890 | Dumbarton | | |

International career
| 1883–1884 | Scotland | 4 | (0) |
- * Club domestic league appearances and goals

William Neilson 'Kinnie' McKinnon (6 June 1859 – 14 October 1899) was a Scottish footballer.

== Career ==
McKinnon played his entire domestic football career with Dumbarton which spanned almost 13 seasons.

== Honours ==
Dumbarton

- Scottish Cup: Runners Up 1880–81
- Dumbartonshire Cup: Winners 1884–85
- Glasgow Charity Cup: Runners Up 1881–82;1884–85
- 4 caps for Scotland between 1882 and 1884
- 4 representative caps for Scotch Counties between 1881 and 1883
- 1 representative cap for Dumbartonshire in 1885, scoring one goal
- 2 international trial matches for Scotland in 1881.
