= Archie Lang (footballer) =

Scottish footballer

Personal information
- Full name: Archibald Lang
- Date of birth: c. 1860
- Date of death: 23 January 1925 (aged 64–65)
- Position: Defender

Senior career*
Years	Team	Apps	(Gls)
1874–1881	Dumbarton	0	(0)

International career
1880	Scotland	1	(0)
- * Club domestic league appearances and goals

Archibald Lang (c. 1860 – 23 January 1925) was a Scottish footballer who played as a defender.

== Career ==
Lang played club football for Dumbarton and made one appearance for Scotland in 1880. He was also selected to play in 4 international trial matches for Scotland between 1878 and 1880.
