= 1933–34 Dumbarton F.C. season =

Dumbarton
1933–1934 season
- Stadium: Boghead Park, Dumbarton
- Scottish League Division Two: 6th
- Scottish Cup: First Round
- Top goalscorer: League: Johnny Haddow (33); All: Johnny Haddow (33)
Home colours

The 1933–34 season was the 57th Scottish football season in which Dumbarton competed at national level, entering the Scottish Football League and the Scottish Cup. In addition Dumbarton competed in the Dumbartonshire Cup.

== Scottish League ==
Dumbarton had their best season since their return to the Second Division 11 years earlier by finishing 6th out of 18, with 37 points – just 8 behind champions Albion Rovers. It could have so been much better, particularly with just 2 home defeats, but as with many previous seasons it was the inability to win away from Boghead which prevented any real promotion hopes.

12 August 1933 League	Edinburgh City	2–1	Dumbarton	Powderhall Stadium
	Ross 1', 70'		Nugent 25'	Referee: J Allan

19 August 1933 League	Dumbarton	2–1	King's Park	Boghead Park
	Haddow 50', 60'		Laird 5'	Attendance: 1,500; Referee: H Maclachlan

26 August 1933 League	Arbroath	4–1	Dumbarton	Gayfield Park
	Mutch 30', 64'; Farquhar 85'; Ross 90'		Haddow 88' (pen.)	Attendance: 2,000; Referee: J Martin

2 September 1933 League	Dumbarton	4–2	Dundee United	Boghead Park
	Ballantyne 1'; Haddow 50', 55'; McGonagle 52'		Newman 16'	Attendance: 2,500; Referee: J Robertson

9 September 1933 League	Albion Rovers	2–0	Dumbarton	Cliftonhill
	Miller 62'; Barclay 85'			Attendance: 2,500; Referee: K Blue

16 September 1933 League	Dumbarton	2–0	Raith Rovers	Boghead Park
	McGonagle 29'; Ballantyne 33'			Attendance: 1,500; Referee: G McCutcheon

23 September 1933 League	Brechin City	4–0	Dumbarton	Glebe Park, Brechin
	Cameron 49'; Pyper 70', 75'; Linton 83'			Referee: A MacKay

30 September 1933 League	Dumbarton	3–1	Dunfermline Athletic	Boghead Park
	Ballantyne 24'; Haddow 53' (pen.); Taylor 90'		McGachie 46'	Attendance: 1,200; Referee: G McKay

7 October 1933 League	Leith Athletic	0–1	Dumbarton	Marine Gardens
			Haddow

14 October 1933 League	Dumbarton	3–4	East Fife	Boghead Park
	Haddow 44', 55', 57'		Weir 12', 58'; McCartney 32', 33'	Attendance: 1,500; Referee: J Robertson

21 October 1933 League	Montrose	2–4	Dumbarton	Links Park
	Geddes 3'; Gillespie		Ritchie, R 13'; Taylor 18'; Collins 60'; Haddow	Referee: J Martin

28 October 1933 League	King's Park	3–1	Dumbarton	Forthbank Park
	Lang; Bryce 10'; Dyet 88'		Kennedy 5'	Referee: J Ramsay

4 November 1933 League	Dumbarton	3–0	Forfar Athletic	Boghead Park
	Haddow 35' (pen.) 50'			Attendance: 1,500; Referee: W McCulloch

11 November 1933 League	Alloa Athletic	2–0	Dumbarton	Recreation Park, Alloa
	Sclater; Hamilton			Referee: W Murray

18 November 1933 League	Dumbarton	2–0	Arbroath	Boghead Park
	Haddow 33'; Ballantyne 60'			Attendance: 1,500; Referee: J McKay

25 November 1933 League	East Stirlingshire	3–1	Dumbarton	Firs Park
	Jack 62', 87'; Duncan 86'		Haddow 60'	Referee: R Innes

2 December 1933 League	Dumbarton	2–0	Stenhousemuir	Boghead Park
	Wotherspoon 52'; Haddow 75'			Attendance: 2,000; Referee: W McCulloch

9 December 1933 League	Morton	3–1	Dumbarton	Cappielow Park
	Gilliland 20'; Keyes 22'		Haddow 80' (pen.)	Attendance: 4,000; Referee: J Robertson

16 December 1933 League	Dumbarton	4–1	Edinburgh City	Boghead Park
	Haddow 46', 70', 74'; Collins 86'		McMeekin 24'	Attendance: 1,000; Referee: W Murray

23 December 1933 League	Dumbarton	3–1	Brechin City	Boghead Park
	Wallace 39'; Haddow 59', 82'		Brown 83'	Attendance: 1,000; Referee: J Ramsay

30 December 1933 League	Dundee United	4–4	Dumbarton	Tannadice Park
	Oucheronie 5'; Ross 33', 79'; Munro		Haddow 86' (pen.); Wotherspoon; McMonagle 65'	Attendance: 1,000; Referee: G McCutcheon

1 January 1934 League	Dumbarton	2–0	Albion Rovers	Boghead Park
	Haddow 15', 50'			Attendance: 2,000

6 January 1934 League	East Fife	3–3	Dumbarton	Bayview Park, Methil
	Forgie 15'; Morrison; Dougan 49'		Wotherspoon 17'; Collins 84'; McMonagle 85'	Referee: G McCutcheon

13 January 1934 League	Dumbarton	1–2	Leith Athletic	Boghead Park
	Wotherspoon		Meikleham; Percy	Attendance: 1,000; Referee: J Robertson

27 January 1934 League	Stenhousemuir	6–4	Dumbarton	Ochilview Park
	Turnbull 5' (pen.); Howie 11'; Hart 28', 30'; Cowan 78'		Haddow 8', 57'; Wotherspoon; Wallace	Referee: H McLachlan

10 February 1934 League	Dunfermline Athletic	3–0	Dumbarton	East End Park
	Watson 6'; Garland 26'; Dobson 88'			Attendance: 5,000; Referee: J Grant

24 February 1934 League	Dumbarton	3–2	Alloa Athletic	Boghead Park
	Haddow; Ritchie, R		Hamilton; Bollind	Attendance: 1,000

3 March 1934 League	Dumbarton	2–0	St Bernard's	Boghead Park
	Ballantyne			Attendance: 800

10 March 1934 League	St Bernard's	7–2	Dumbarton	Royal Gymnasium Ground
	Forbes 10'; Murray; Newman; Russell 88'		Wallace; Kennedy	Referee: J Allan

17 March 1934 League	Dumbarton	2–0	East Stirling	Boghead Park
	Wallace 40'; Haddow 89'			Attendance: 800; Referee: W McCulloch

24 March 1934 League	Forfar Athletic	4–0	Dumbarton	Station Park, Forfar
	Black 69', 84'; Gabriel 70', 89'			Referee: H McLachlan

31 March 1934 League	Dumbarton	2–0	Montrose	Boghead Park
	Ritchie, R 75'; Taylor 80'			Referee: W Murray

7 April 1934 League	Raith Rovers	1–1	Dumbarton	Starks Park
	Crichton 30'		Ritchie, R 75'	Attendance: 500; Referee: A Bainbridge

21 April 1934 League	Dumbarton	3–1	Morton	Boghead Park
	Haddow; Collins		Cummings	Attendance: 1,500; Referee: J Ramsay

== Scottish Cup ==
There was another first round exit, this time to Arbroath.

20 January 1934 Cup R1	Arbroath	2–1	Dumbarton	Gayfield Park
	Brand 7'; Muir 68'		Collins 21'	Attendance: 3,440; Referee: D Rees

== Dumbartonshire Cup ==
Dumbarton lost the Dumbartonshire Cup to non-league Vale Ocaba.

18 April 1934 Final	Vale Ocaba	3–1	Dumbarton	Millburn Park
	Boyd 18'; Clelland; Allan 75'		Kennedy 4'	Attendance: 600

== Friendlies ==
7 September 1933 Friendly	Dumbarton	4–2	Milngavie	Boghead Park
	Wallace; Kennedy		Goal

3 February 1934 Friendly	Dumbarton	1–3	Clyde	Boghead Park
	Wallace		Robertson; McCulloch	Referee: J Love

== Player statistics ==
No.	Pos	Nat	Player	Total		Second Division		Scottish Cup	
No.	Pos	Nat	Player	Apps	Goals	Apps	Goals	Apps	Goals
	GK	(Scotland) SCO	Archibald Milliken	2	0	2	0	0	0
	GK	(Scotland) SCO	William Simpson	33	0	32	0	1	0
	DF	(Scotland) SCO	William Hamilton	2	0	2	0	0	0
	DF	(Scotland) SCO	Kane	2	0	2	0	0	0
	DF	(Scotland) SCO	McCallum	2	0	2	0	0	0
	DF	(Scotland) SCO	McCrone	1	0	1	0	0	0
	DF	(Scotland) SCO	William Meek	11	0	10	0	1	0
	DF	(Scotland) SCO	James Osborne	7	0	7	0	0	0
	DF	(Scotland) SCO	Martin Watson	29	0	28	0	1	0
	MF	(Scotland) SCO	Charles Ballantyne	32	6	31	6	1	0
	MF	(Scotland) SCO	John Forgie	21	0	21	0	0	0
	MF	(Scotland) SCO	Allan Miller	3	0	3	0	0	0
	MF	(Scotland) SCO	William Murray	4	0	4	0	0	0
	MF	(Scotland) SCO	Dick Ritchie	33	4	32	4	1	0
	MF	(Scotland) SCO	George Ritchie	28	0	28	0	0	0
	MF	(Scotland) SCO	Robert Taylor	19	3	18	3	1	0
	FW	(Scotland) SCO	Blackwood	1	0	1	0	0	0
	FW	(Scotland) SCO	David Collins	21	5	20	4	1	1
	FW	(Scotland) SCO	Johnny Haddow	32	33	31	33	1	0
	FW	(Scotland) SCO	David Hodge	10	1	10	1	0	0
	FW	(Scotland) SCO	Kempton	2	0	2	0	0	0
	FW	(Scotland) SCO	David Kennedy	15	3	15	3	0	0
	FW	(Scotland) SCO	Thomas McGunnigle	27	4	26	4	1	0
	FW	(Scotland) SCO	Michael Noone	1	0	1	0	0	0
	FW	(Scotland) SCO	A Ritchie	1	0	1	0	0	0
	FW	(Scotland) SCO	John Wallace	25	4	24	4	1	0
	FW	(Scotland) SCO	Daniel Wotherspoon	21	5	20	5	1	0

=== Transfers ===
==== Players in ====
Player	From	Date
(Scotland) Daniel Wotherspoon	(Scotland) Maryhill	3 Jul 1933
(Scotland) Dick Ritchie	(Scotland) Morton	4 Aug 1933
(Scotland) George Ritchie	(Scotland)	7 Aug 1933
(Scotland) John Forgie	(Scotland) Milngavie	8 Aug 1933
(Scotland) Michael Noone	(Scotland) Morton	9 Aug 1933
(Scotland) Martin Watson	(Scotland) Queen of the South	10 Aug 1933
(Scotland) David Hodge	(Scotland) Morton	17 Aug 1933
(Scotland) Johnny Haddow	(Scotland) King's Park	18 Aug 1933
(Scotland) Thomas McGunnigle	(Northern Ireland) Bangor	24 Aug 1933
(Scotland) John Wallace	(Scotland)	3 Oct 1933
(Scotland) David Collins	(England) Bradford PA	21 Oct 1933
(Scotland) James Osborne	(England) Northampton Town	29 Nov 1933
(Scotland) William Meek	(Scotland)	18 Jan 1934
(Scotland) Allan Miller	(Scotland)	

==== Players out ====
Player	To	Date
(Scotland) James Liddell	(Scotland) Albion Rovers	19 Jun 1933
(Scotland) Archibald Milliken	(Scotland) Dundee United (loan)	13 Jul 1933
(Scotland) Andrew Young	(Scotland) Freed	15 Jul 1933
(Scotland) William Hamilton	(Scotland) Edinburgh City	27 jul 1933
(Scotland) Willie Parlane	(Scotland) St Mirren	8 Aug 1933
(Scotland) John Lang	(Scotland) King's Park	12 Sep 1933
(Scotland) David Hodge	(Scotland) Freed	18 Oct 1933
(Scotland) Andrew Heeps	(Scotland) East Stirling	
(Scotland) Jim Kelso	(England) Bradford PA	
(Scotland) Archibald Turner	(Scotland) Kilmarnock	

In addition William Gilmour, Henry McAvoy, William McGall, Sam McNee, Michael Noone and Alex Parlane all played their last games in Dumbarton 'colours'.
