= 1932–33 Dumbarton F.C. season =

Dumbarton
1932–1933 season
- Stadium: Boghead Park, Dumbarton
- Scottish League Division Two: 9th
- Scottish Cup: Second Round
- Top goalscorer: League: Willie Parlane (21); All: Willie Parlane (22)
Home colours

The 1932–33 season was the 56th Scottish football season in which Dumbarton competed at national level, entering the Scottish Football League and the Scottish Cup. In addition Dumbarton competed in the Dumbartonshire Cup.

== Scottish League ==
Dumbarton 11th successive season in the Second Division saw an improvement in performances as they climbed back into the top half of the league by finishing 9th out of 18, with 34 points – 20 behind champions Hibernian. The improvement could have been greater as there is no doubt that the campaign was handicapped by Dumbarton's inability to register a single win away from Boghead.

13 August 1932 League	Dumbarton	5–1; VOID	Bo'ness	Boghead Park
	Parlane, J 7', 28', 53'; Collins 77'		Heeps	Attendance: 2,000; Referee: K Blue

20 August 1932 League	Leith Athletic	3–1	Dumbarton	Marine Gardens
	Young 90'; Morrish		Nugent 75'	Attendance: 1,000; Referee: W Whiteside

24 August 1931 League	Dumbarton	2–0	Stenhousemuir	Boghead Park
	Young 35'			Attendance: 2,000; Referee: J McKay

27 August 1931 League	Dumbarton	6–2	Edinburgh City	Boghead Park
	Parlane, W Nugent; Parlane, J Collins		Cumming 5'	Attendance: 2,000

3 September 1932 League	King's Park	3–3	Dumbarton	Forthbank Park
	Anderson; Hillan; Roughhead		Nugent 46'; Kelso (pen.)	Attendance: 1,500; Referee: W Smith

10 September 1931 League	Dumbarton	3–0	Albion Rovers	Boghead Park
	Parlane, J 23'; Parlane, W 37', 46'			Attendance: 3,000; Referee: J Allan

17 September 1932 League	Dundee United	5–2	Dumbarton	Tannadice Park
	Dyet; Brant		McGall 52' 46'	Attendance: 1,500; Referee: J Grant

24 September 1931 League	Dumbarton	2–1	Arbroath	Boghead Park
	Young 1'; Parlane, W 65'		Gold 82'	Attendance: 2,000; Referee: J Leggatt

29 September 1932 League	Queen of the South	2–0	Dumbarton	Palmerston Park
	Bell; Burt			Attendance: 3,500

1 October 1932 League	East Fife	1–1	Dumbarton	Bayview Park, Methil
	Walker		Kennedy.D	Attendance: 1,500; Referee: P Gardiner

8 October 1931 League	Dumbarton	2–0	Brechin City	Boghead Park
	Lang 62'; McGall 85'			Attendance: 2,000; Referee: J Robertson

15 October 1932 League	Dunfermline Athletic	3–0	Dumbarton	East End Park
	Garland; Paterson; Rarity			Attendance: 1,000; Referee: J Ramsay

22 October 1931 League	Dumbarton	3–1; VOID	Armadale	Boghead Park
	Walker 14'; Young; McGall 40'		Kerr (pen.)	Attendance: 1,500; Referee: J Leggatt

29 October 1932 League	St Bernard's	4–0	Dumbarton	Royal Gymnasium Ground
	Eadie; Murray; Drummond			Attendance: 1,000; Referee: R Innes

5 November 1932 League	Stenhousemuir	3–2	Dumbarton	Ochilview Park
	Cowan 11'; Hart 30', 75'		Parlane, W 8'; Lang 60'	Referee: P Allan

12 November 1931 League	Dumbarton	1–1	Queen of the South	Boghead Park
	Parlane, W 40'		Chatton (o.g.)	Attendance: 3,000; Referee: J Leggatt

19 November 1931 League	Dumbarton	2–2	Forfar Athletic	Boghead Park
	Liddell 10' (pen.); Kennedy, D 49'		Lawie 40' (pen.); Preston 80'	Attendance: 2,500; Referee: P Kilbride

26 November 1932 League	Alloa Athletic	4–1	Dumbarton	Recreation Park, Alloa
	Junior; Gillies		Parlane, W	Attendance: 3,000; Referee: W Gardiner

3 December 1931 League	Dumbarton	3–2	Hibernian	Boghead Park
	Heeps; Young 85'		Hutchison; Wallace	Attendance: 3,000; Referee: J Allan

10 December 1932 League	Montrose	3–1	Dumbarton	Links Park
	Stoddart; Newman; Sharlaw 80'		Parlane, W	Attendance: 700; Referee: J Ramage

17 December 1931 League	Dumbarton	2–2; VOID	Raith Rovers	Boghead Park
	Lang; Parlane, W		Cowan 2'; Innes 58'	Referee: R Innes

24 December 1932 League	Arbroath	3–1	Dumbarton	Gayfield Park
	Muir 75'; Farquhar 79'; Boath 86'		Heeps 4'	Attendance: 700; Referee: J Ramage

31 December 1931 League	Dumbarton	3–0	Leith Athletic	Boghead Park
	Parlane, J Parlane, W Lang			Attendance: 2,000; Referee: J Allan

2 January 1933 League	Albion Rovers	3–1	Dumbarton	Cliftonhill
	McPhee 9'; Renwick 37'; Buchanan 41'		Parlane, W 90' (pen.)	Referee: J McKay

3 January 1933 League	Dumbarton	2–0	Dundee United	Boghead Park
	McGall 15', 22'			Attendance: 2,000; Referee: A Gardiner

7 January 1933 League	Edinburgh City	1–1	Dumbarton	Powderhall Stadium
	Cumming 20'		Nugent 55'	Referee: J Robertson

14 January 1933 League	Dumbarton	2–0	King's Park	Boghead Park
	McMeekin 67'; Parlane, W 88'			Attendance: 2,000

11 February 1933 League	Dumbarton	2–1	East Fife	Boghead Park
	McMeekin 78'; Parlane, W 90'		McGachie 46'	Attendance: 2,000; Referee: W Whiteside

18 February 1933 League	Dumbarton	3–2	Raith Rovers	Boghead Park
	Heeps 5'; Kennedy, D 10'; Parlane, W 12'		Archibald 41'; Junior 85'	Attendance: 1,500; Referee: R Innes

4 March 1933 League	Dumbarton	1–2	Dunfermline Athletic	Boghead Park
	Heeps 65'		McAvoy 1' (o.g.); Weir 80'	Attendance: 1,200; Referee: H McLachlan

18 March 1933 League	Dumbarton	6–0	St Bernard's	Boghead Park
	Young 15', 17'; Parlane, W 18' 75'; Kennedy, D 46'			Referee: J McCutcheon

25 March 1933 League	Forfar Athletic	8–3	Dumbarton	Station Park, Forfar
	Newman 14', 62', 68'; Preston 18', 28'; Black 35'; Lawir 24' (pen.)		Parlane, W 37'; Heeps 44'; Young 53'	Referee: P Allan

1 April 1933 League	Brechin City	2–1	Dumbarton	Glebe Park, Brechin
	Pryde 65' (pen.), 80' (pen.)		Parlane, W 67'	Referee: D Rees

8 April 1933 League	Dumbarton	3–1	Alloa Athletic	Boghead Park
	Parlane, W 12'; Kennedy, M 32'; Ballantyne		Bell 83'	Attendance: 1,000; Referee: J Robertson

15 April 1933 League	Hibernian	1–0	Dumbarton	Easter Road
	Hart 8'			Attendance: 3,000; Referee: J Leggatt

22 April 1933 League	Dumbarton	6–2	Montrose	Boghead Park
	Parlane, W 20', 54'; Cameron 22', 53', 80'; Lang 25'		Bennett 28'; Gillespie 46'	Attendance: 1,500; Referee: H McLachlan

29 April 1933 League	Raith Rovers	2–2	Dumbarton	Starks Park
	Newman		Parlane, W 5'; Kennedy, D	Referee: W Smith

== Scottish Cup ==
Dumbarton reached the second round before losing out to Albion Rovers.

21 January 1933 Cup R1	Dumbarton	3–1	Beith	Boghead Park
	Young 31'; McMeekin 65'; Parlane, W		Morrison 52'	Attendance: 3,000; Referee: A Robertson

4 February 1933 Cup R2	Dumbarton	1–2	Albion Rovers	Boghead Park
	Waddell 52' (o.g.)		McPhee 35', 85'	Attendance: 3,500; Referee: W Holburn

== Dumbartonshire Cup ==
Dumbarton retained the Dumbartonshire Cup, beating Vale Ocaba in the final.

28 January 1933 Final	Dumbarton	2–0	Vale Ocaba	Boghead Park
	Ballantyne 61'; McMeekin			Attendance: 1,000

== Friendlies ==
26 April 1933 Friendly	Dumbarton	4–0	Dumbarton Harp United	Boghead Park
	Murray; Kennedy; McGall; Miller

== Player statistics ==
No.	Pos	Nat	Player	Total		Second Division		Scottish Cup	
No.	Pos	Nat	Player	Apps	Goals	Apps	Goals	Apps	Goals
	GK	(Scotland) SCO	William Gilmour	11	0	9	0	2	0
	GK	(Scotland) SCO	Kennedy	2	0	2	0	0	0
	GK	(Scotland) SCO	William Simpson	23	0	23	0	0	0
	DF	(Ireland) EIR	Harry Chatton	31	0	29	0	2	0
	DF	(Scotland) SCO	Henderson	1	0	1	0	0	0
	DF	(Scotland) SCO	Hendry	1	0	1	0	0	0
	DF	(Scotland) SCO	Jim Kelso	34	2	32	2	2	0
	DF	(Scotland) SCO	McDermid	2	0	2	0	0	0
	DF	(Scotland) SCO	McIvor	1	0	1	0	0	0
	DF	(Scotland) SCO	Alex Parlane	1	0	1	0	0	0
	MF	(Scotland) SCO	Charles Ballantyne	35	1	33	1	2	0
	MF	(Scotland) SCO	Gray	2	0	2	0	0	0
	MF	(Scotland) SCO	Matthew Kennedy	3	1	3	1	0	0
	MF	(Scotland) SCO	James Liddell	28	1	26	1	2	0
	MF	(Scotland) SCO	Henry McAvoy	9	0	9	0	0	0
	MF	(Scotland) SCO	Joseph McMeekin	6	3	4	2	2	1
	MF	(Scotland) SCO	Sam McNee	5	0	5	0	0	0
	MF	(Scotland) SCO	William Murray	10	0	10	0	0	0
	MF	(Scotland) SCO	John Nugent	8	7	8	7	0	0
	MF	(Scotland) SCO	Johnny Parlane	22	3	20	3	2	0
	MF	(Scotland) SCO	Robert Taylor	12	0	10	0	2	0
	FW	(Scotland) SCO	Arthur	1	0	1	0	0	0
	FW	(Scotland) SCO	Ronald Cameron	1	3	1	3	0	0
	FW	(Scotland) SCO	David Collins	5	1	5	1	0	0
	FW	(Scotland) SCO	Andrew Heeps	15	5	15	5	0	0
	FW	(Scotland) SCO	David Kennedy	27	5	26	5	1	0
	FW	(Scotland) SCO	John Lang	24	4	23	4	1	0
	FW	(Scotland) SCO	William McGall	9	5	9	5	0	0
	FW	(Scotland) SCO	Willie Parlane	34	22	32	21	2	1
	FW	(Scotland) SCO	Archibald Turner	10	0	10	0	0	0
	FW	(Scotland) SCO	Walker	2	0	2	0	0	0
	FW	(Scotland) SCO	Andrew Young	21	9	19	8	2	1

=== International Caps ===
Johnny Parlane earned his first cap playing for Scotland Amateur against Ireland on 28 January 1933.

=== Transfers ===
==== Players in ====
Player	From	Date
(Scotland) David Kennedy	(Scotland) Dumbarton Fern	17 Jun 1932
(Republic of Ireland) Harry Chatton	(Scotland) Partick Thistle (loan)	9 Aug 1932
(Scotland) William McGall	(Scotland) Dumbarton Fern	13 Sep 1932
(Scotland) John Nugent	(Scotland) Renton Glen Albion	25 Oct 1932
(Scotland) William Simpson	(Scotland) Stenhousemuir	8 Nov 1932
(Scotland) Andrew Heeps	(Scotland) Bo'ness	17 Nov 1932
(Scotland) Henry McAvoy	(United States)	29 Dec 1932
(Scotland) Joseph McMeekin	(Scotland) Montrose	14 Jan 1933
(Scotland) Robert Taylor	(Scotland) Clyde	14 Jan 1933

==== Players out ====
Player	To	Date
(Scotland) William Buchanan	(Scotland) Armadale	6 Aug 1932
(Scotland) David Collins	(England) Bradford PA	6 Aug 1932
(England) William Molloy	(Wales) Swansea Town	13 Sep 1932
(Scotland) Archibald Turner	(Scotland) Kilmarnock	16 Nov 1932
(Scotland) Johnny Parlane	(Scotland) Raith Rovers	10 Feb 1933
(Scotland) Joseph McMeekin	(Scotland) Released	15 Feb 1933
(Scotland) John Nugent	(Scotland) Released	22 Feb 1933

In addition George Hodge, Norman Shaw and John Thomson all played their last games in Dumbarton 'colours'.
