= 1935–36 Dumbarton F.C. season =

Dumbarton
1935–1936 season
- Stadium: Boghead Park, Dumbarton
- Scottish League Division Two: 18th
- Scottish Cup: Third Round
- Top goalscorer: League: Johnny Haddow (10); All: Johnny Haddow (10)
Home colours

The 1935–36 season was the 59th Scottish football season in which Dumbarton competed at national level, entering the Scottish Football League and the Scottish Cup. In addition Dumbarton competed in the Dumbartonshire Cup.

== Scottish League ==
Dumbarton's slump continued in their 14th successive season in the Second Division, by finishing 18th and bottom, with just 16 points - 43 behind champions Falkirk. The transfer of Johnny Haddow to Falkirk in November was a huge loss and just one further win was registered all season. Heavy defeats were again a feature, and for the first time Dumbarton conceded over 100 goals in the league in a single season.

10 August 1935 League	East Stirling	1–1	Dumbarton	Firs Park
	Brown 90' (pen.)		Crawford 35'	Attendance: 2,000; Referee: J Grant

17 August 1935 League	Dumbarton	4–2	East Fife	Boghead Park
	Taylor 16'; Haddow 18' (pen.), 60'; Craig 26'		Scott 32'; Adam 35'	Attendance: 2,000; Referee: R Innes

24 August 1935 League	Edinburgh City	0–0	Dumbarton	Powderhall Stadium
				Attendance: 500; Referee: R Carruthers

31 August 1935 League	Dumbarton	1–1	Leith Athletic	Boghead Park
	Crawford 69'		O'Rawe 79'	Attendance: 2,000; Referee: J Armour

7 September 1935 League	Montrose	3–0	Dumbarton	Links Park
	Malloy 27'; Hampton 74', 85'			Attendance: 1,500; Referee: W Finlay

14 September 1935 League	Dumbarton	2–0	Stenhousemuir	Boghead Park
	Taylor, G 16'; Speedie 35'			Attendance: 1,100; Referee: J MacKay

21 September 1935 League	Forfar Athletic	3–1	Dumbarton	Station Park, Forfar
	Cameron 44'; Black, W 68', 71'		Taylor, G 25'	Attendance: 1,000; Referee: J Lawrie

28 September 1935 League	Dumbarton	3–5	Dundee United	Boghead Park
	Haddow 18'; Cook 20'; Cameron 51'		Germanson 4', 44', 88'; Hutchison 35'; Milne 56'	Attendance: 1,000; Referee: H McLachlan

5 October 1935 League	Cowdenbeath	6–2	Dumbarton	Central Park, Cowdenbeath
	Turnbull 1', 20', 89'; Wilkie 24'; Deans 44'; Whitelaw 71' (pen.)		Cameron 10'; Cook 32'	Attendance: 1,000; Referee: W Smart

12 October 1935 League	Dumbarton	6–1	King's Park	Boghead Park
	Watson 35' (pen.); Cameron 39', 65'; Cook 43'; Haddow 76', 84'		Laird 65'	Attendance: 1,100; Referee: H McLachlan

19 October 1935 League	Dumbarton	1–2	Forfar Athletic	Boghead Park
	Haddow 76'		Donaldson 20', 89'	Attendance: 1,000; Referee: J Robertson

26 October 1935 League	Leith Athletic	6–0	Dumbarton	Marine Gardens
	O'Rawe 10', 89'; Peat 19', 47'; Calder 51'; Laidlaw 65'			Attendance: 1,000; Referee: R Innes

2 November 1935 League	Raith Rovers	1–3	Dumbarton	Starks Park
	Tait 21' (OG)		Cook 15', 51'; Haddow 75'	Attendance: 500; Referee: J Yeaman

9 November 1935 League	Dumbarton	1–3	Morton	Boghead Park
	Haddow 83'		Robertson 5'; McGardy 27', 53'	Attendance: 2,000; Referee: M Dale

16 November 1935 League	Alloa Athletic	5–0	Dumbarton	Recreation Park, Alloa
	Duffy 25'; Shankley 28', 35'; Williamson 60'; Richardson 85'			Attendance: 2,000; Referee: W Finlay

23 November 1935 League	Dumbarton	4–4	Montrose	Boghead Park
	Cook 2'; Haddow 7', 35'; Cameron 33'		Malloy 4', 25'; Conlin 13'; Herbert 55'	Attendance: 800; Referee: W Murray

30 November 1935 League	Dumbarton	1–5	Brechin City	Boghead Park
	Cook 65'		Wann 53', 68'; Taylor 54', 56'; Reid 80'	Attendance: 700; Referee: R Innes

7 December 1935 League	Stenhousemuir	3–0	Dumbarton	Ochilview Park
	Morrison 64'; Fisher 68'; Murray, R 86'			Referee: A Williamson

14 December 1935 League	Dumbarton	2–7	Falkirk	Boghead Park
	Cook 68'; McDowall 89'		Haddow 8', 43', 57', 78', 88'; Cowan 12', 84'	Attendance: 1,200; Referee: W McCulloch

28 December 1935 League	Dundee United	8–0	Dumbarton	Tannadice Park
	Milne, A 21', 55', 70', 84'; Milne, J 38', 77'; Smith 11'; Murray 50'			Attendance: 5,000; Referee: W Finlay

1 January 1936 League	Dumbarton	3–3	Cowdenbeath	Boghead Park
	Speedie 3'; McDowall 62'; Watson 71' (pen.)		McHarg 20'; Boag 66'; Graham 70' (pen.)	Attendance: 1,100; Referee: J Robertson

4 January 1936 League	St Mirren	8–0	Dumbarton	Love Street (stadium)
	Latimer 20'; Muir 43', 81', 87'; McGregor 58', 75'; Knox 49'; Miller 85'			Attendance: 8,000; Referee: R Innes

11 January 1936 League	Dumbarton	0–3	Alloa Athletic	Boghead Park
			Foley 57', 73'; Shankley 86'	Attendance: 1,100; Referee: H McLachlan

18 January 1936 League	East Fife	4–2	Dumbarton	Bayview Park, Methil
	Cowan 15', 68'; Adams 20', 86'		McDowall 57'; Parlane, W 80'	Attendance: 1,000; Referee: A Williamson

8 February 1936 League	Dumbarton	1–2	Edinburgh City	Boghead Park
	Yuill 88'		Kade 27', 55'	Attendance: 900; Referee: R Innes

15 February 1936 League	Dumbarton	3–3	East Stirling	Boghead Park
	McDwoall 10', 45'; Speedie 88'		Meechan 12'; McPhee 19'; Newman 60'	Attendance: 800; Referee: W Murray

29 February 1936 League	King's Park	5–2	Dumbarton	Forthbank Park
	Andrew 18', 60'; McPherson 26', 67'; McCombe 30'		Parlane, W 26'; Watson 83'	Attendance: 600; Referee: A Williamson

7 March 1936 League	Brechin City	6–1	Dumbarton	Glebe Park, Brechin
	Wann 10' (pen.), 20', 50', 89'; Whyte 37'; Boland 80'		Cameron 65'	Referee: J Yeaman

14 March 1936 League	Dumbarton	1–2	St Mirren	Boghead Park
	Wallace 52'		McGregor 20', 21'	Attendance: 1,900; Referee: R Carruthers

21 March 1936 League	St Bernard's	7–0	Dumbarton	Royal Gymnasium Ground
	Noble 1' (pen.); Nelson 8', 62'; Hay 22', 39'; Russell 84'			Attendance: 500; Referee: J Welsh

4 April 1936 League	Morton	5–1	Dumbarton	Cappielow Park
	Calder 44', 80'; Benzie 47'; Collins 65', 68'		Watson 63' (pen.)	Attendance: 2,000; Referee: W Wilson

11 April 1936 League	Dumbarton	3–4	Raith Rovers	Boghead Park
	Wallace 20'; Speedie 54'; Watson 61' (pen.)		Philp,H 15'; Fulton 52'; McGill 70'; Denholm 89'	Attendance: 700; Referee: J Grant

18 April 1936 League	Dumbarton	1–3	Falkirk	Boghead Park
	Wallace 40'		Keyes 26', 44'; Carruthers 70'	Attendance: 4,000; Referee: R Innes

25 April 1936 League	Dumbarton	2–0	St Bernard's	Boghead Park
	Tait 44'; Parlane, W 47'			Attendance: 500; Referee: W Wilson

=== Promotion/relegation Election ===
With there being no applicants for admission to the Second Division, the bottom two clubs - Raith Rovers and Dumbarton - maintained their league status.

== Scottish Cup ==
This season there was a third round exit, to First Division Third Lanark.

25 January 1936 Cup R1	Burntisland Shipyard	2–2	Dumbarton	Kirkton Park
	Burnett 75'; Birrell 85'		Crawford 12', 48'	Attendance: 650; Referee: H McLachlan

1 February 1936 Cup R1r	Dumbarton	4–2	Burntisland Shipyard	Boghead Park
	Crawford 7', 77'; McDowall 10', 40'		Birrell 1'; Brown 30'	Attendance: 1,780; Referee: H McLachlan

22 February 1936 Cup R3	Third Lanark	8–0	Dumbarton	Cathkin Park
	Hay 8', 63', 66'; Kennedy 24', 80'; Carabine 77' (pen.); Kinnaird 79'; Gallacher 81'			Attendance: 650; Referee: J Martin

== Dumbartonshire Cup ==
There was some cheer when Dumbarton regained the Dumbartonshire Cup, with victory over non-league side Vale Ocaba.

20 April 1936 Final	Vale Ocaba	0–1	Dumbarton	Millburn Park
			Parlane, W	Attendance: 1,500

== Friendly ==
7 September 1935 Friendly	Dumbarton Harp	0–4	Dumbarton	Meadow Park, Dumbarton
			Cameron; Taylor, A

== Player statistics ==
No.	Pos	Nat	Player	Total		Second Division		Scottish Cup	
No.	Pos	Nat	Player	Apps	Goals	Apps	Goals	Apps	Goals
	GK	(Scotland) SCO	Robert Kerr	25	0	24	0	1	0
	GK	(Scotland) SCO	John McIntyre	12	0	10	0	2	0
	DF	(Scotland) SCO	John Casey	14	0	11	0	3	0
	DF	(Scotland) SCO	William Clark	16	0	16	0	0	0
	DF	(Scotland) SCO	Robert Tait	35	1	33	1	2	0
	DF	(Scotland) SCO	Martin Watson	35	5	32	5	3	0
	MF	(Scotland) SCO	Robert Hogg	9	0	7	0	2	0
	MF	(Scotland) SCO	George Taylor	27	3	26	3	1	0
	MF	(Scotland) SCO	Todd	3	0	3	0	0	0
	MF	(Scotland) SCO	Alex Young	13	0	10	0	3	0
	FW	(Scotland) SCO	Ronald Cameron	13	6	13	6	0	0
	FW	(Scotland) SCO	A Clark	4	0	4	0	0	0
	FW	(Scotland) SCO	Harry Cook	24	8	21	8	3	0
	FW	(Scotland) SCO	John Craig	8	1	8	1	0	0
	FW	(Scotland) SCO	John Crawford	29	4	26	0	3	4
	FW	(Scotland) SCO	Johnny Haddow	13	10	13	10	0	0
	FW	(Scotland) SCO	Matthew Kennedy	3	0	3	0	0	0
	FW	(Scotland) SCO	Frank McAulay	2	0	2	0	0	0
	FW	(Scotland) SCO	Isaac McDowell	17	7	14	5	3	2
	FW	(England) ENG	William Molloy	2	0	2	0	0	0
	FW	(Scotland) SCO	Willie Parlane	19	3	16	3	3	0
	FW	(Scotland) SCO	Robert Speedie	37	4	34	4	3	0
	FW	(Scotland) SCO	Archibald Taylor	12	0	12	0	0	0
	FW	(Scotland) SCO	Archibald Turner	1	0	1	0	0	0
	FW	(Scotland) SCO	John Wallace	28	3	27	3	1	0
	FW	(Scotland) SCO	Williamson	3	0	3	0	0	0
	FW	(Scotland) SCO	Yuill	4	1	4	1	0	0

=== Transfers ===
==== Players in ====
Player	From	Date
(Scotland) Robert Kerr	(Scotland) Vale Ocaba	9 May 1935
(Scotland) William Clark	(Scotland) Cowdenbeath	15 May 1935
(Scotland) Archibald Taylor	(Scotland) Vale St Andrews	2 Jul 1935
(Scotland) John Craig	(Scotland) Rangers	4 Jul 1935
(Scotland) John Crawford	(Scotland) Stenhousemuir	4 Jul 1935
(Scotland) John McIntyre	(Scotland) Govan Britannia	5 Aug 1935
(Scotland) Robert Tait	(Northern Ireland) Ards	6 Aug 1935
(Scotland) George Taylor	(Scotland) Clyde Valley	6 Aug 1935
(Scotland) William Molloy	(Scotland) Falkirk	6 Sep 1935
(Scotland) Harry Cook	(Scotland) Kilmarnock	23 Sep 1935
(Scotland) Ronald Cameron	(Republic of Ireland) Cork	26 Sep 1935
(Scotland) Archibald Turner	(Scotland) Kilmarnock	26 Oct 1935
(Scotland) Issac McDowell	(Scotland) Airdrie	29 Nov 1935
(Scotland) Willie Parlane	(Scotland) Queen's Park	10 Dec 1935
(Scotland) Robert Hogg	(Scotland) Dundee United	1 Jan 1936
(Scotland) Alex Young	(Scotland) Milngavie Jnrs	17 Jan 1936
(Scotland) A Clark		23 Jan 1936

==== Players out ====
Player	To	Date
(Scotland) Charles Ballantyne	(Scotland) Clyde	8 May 1935
(Scotland) William Molloy	(Scotland) Released	4 Oct 1935
(Scotland) William Simpson	(Scotland) Raith Rovers	25 Oct 1935
(Scotland) Johnny Haddow	(Scotland) Falkirk	25 Nov 1935
(Scotland) John Craig	(Scotland) Released	14 Jan 1936

In addition Richard English, Robert Henderson, Robert Kyle, William McDonald, James Mcleod, Allan Miller, Archie Milliken, Hugh Moran, James Muir, Edwin Powell, John Pyper and John Rodger all played their last games in Dumbarton 'colours'.
