= 1931–32 Dumbarton F.C. season =

Dumbarton
1931–1932 season
- Manager: None
- Stadium: Boghead Park, Dumbarton
- Scottish League Division Two: 12th
- Scottish Cup: First Round
- Top goalscorer: League: Willie Parlane (11); All: Willie Parlane (11)
Home colours

The 1931–32 season was the 55th Scottish football season in which Dumbarton competed at national level, entering the Scottish Football League and the Scottish Cup. In addition Dumbarton competed in the Dumbartonshire Cup.

== Scottish League ==
The tenth season in a row in the Second Division saw Dumbarton no closer to gaining promotion as another poor start to the league campaign, which saw only 5 wins by the turn of the year, put paid to any hopes for a further season. In the end, fortunes were to improve, and Dumbarton finished 12th out of 20, with 38 points - 17 behind champions East Stirling.

8 August 1931 League	Dumbarton	1–1	St Bernard's	Boghead Park
	Thomson 47'		Davidson 41'	Attendance: 2,000

15 August 1931 League	St Johnstone	3–0	Dumbarton	Muirton Park
	Nicolson 5', 76'; Cameron 57'			Attendance: 7,000; Referee: J Robertson

22 August 1931 League	Dumbarton	3–1	Armadale	Boghead Park
	McLachlan 65'; Thomson 75'		Miller 55'	Attendance: 2,000; Referee: C McGreachan

25 August 1931 League	Dumbarton	2–2	Brechin City	Boghead Park
	Kelso 55' (pen.); Young 84'		Junior 17'; Stewart 34'	Attendance: 2,000; Referee: A McCutcheon

29 August 1931 League	Montrose	1–0	Dumbarton	Links Park
	Gibb 20'			Attendance: 2,000; Referee: P Allan

3 September 1931 League	East Fife	4–1	Dumbarton	Bayview Park, Methil
	Lowery 20'; Weir 44'; Newman		Parlane, W	Attendance: 1,500; Referee: R Smith

5 September 1931 League	Dumbarton	1–1	Edinburgh City	Boghead Park
	Lang 60'		Cumming	Referee: J Robertson

12 September 1931 League	East Stirling	3–0	Dumbarton	Firs Park
	Hart 52', 65', 84'			Attendance: 2,000; Referee: W Smith

19 September 1931 League	Dumbarton	4–0	Stenhousemuir	Boghead Park
	Parlane, W 40'; Buchanan 65'; Kelso 72' (pen.); Collins 74'			Attendance: 1,500; Referee: J McKay

26 September 1931 League	Alloa Athletic	1–1	Dumbarton	Recreation Park, Alloa
	Forsyth (pen.)		Parlane, J	Referee: W Murray

3 October 1931 League	Dumbarton	1–3	Forfar Athletic	Boghead Park
	Buchanan 51'		Newman 24', 43'; Black 35'	Attendance: 1,500; Referee: G McCutcheon

10 October 1931 League	Raith Rovers	4–2	Dumbarton	Starks Park
	Sharp 7'; Archibald; McLaren; Cowan		Lang	Attendance: 2,000; Referee: J Robertson

17 October 1931 League	Arbroath	5–0	Dumbarton	Gayfield Park
	Stewart 30', 80'; Donaldson 31'; Brown 44', 65'			Attendance: 1,400; Referee: G Pool

24 October 1931 League	Dumbarton	2–1	Dunfermline Athletic	Boghead Park
	Lang 41'; Thomson 65'		McFadyen 4'	Attendance: 1,500; Referee: J Burdon

31 October 1931 League	Albion Rovers	5–0	Dumbarton	Cliftonhill
	Davidson 5'; Renwick 30' 55'; Browning 44'			Attendance: 1,500; Referee: C McGreachan

7 November 1931 League	Dumbarton	0–2	Hibernian	Boghead Park
			Dobson 23', 67'	Attendance: 1,200; Referee: J Robertson

14 November 1931 League	King's Park	2–2	Dumbarton	Forthbank Park
	Hillan; Haddow 89'		Hendry; Parlane, J 47'	Referee: W Smith

21 November 1931 League	Queen of the South	2–1	Dumbarton	Palmerston Park
	Rutherford 43' (pen.), 80'		Young 78'	Referee: W Jamieson

28 November 1931 League	Dumbarton	6–2	Bo'ness	Boghead Park
	Parlane, W 30'; Young 32'; Lang 46'; Parlane, J		Heeps 55'; Wallace	Attendance: 1,500; Referee: J Burdon

12 December 1931 League	Brechin City	1–1	Dumbarton	Glebe Park, Brechin
	Moffat 27'		Parlane, W 11'	Referee: P Allan

19 December 1931 League	St Bernard's	0–0	Dumbarton	Royal Gymnasium Ground
				Attendance: 1,000; Referee: W Jamieson

25 December 1931 League	Edinburgh City	4–2	Dumbarton	Powderhall Stadium
	Robson 10'; Strachan 49', 85'; McDonald 75'		Young 23'; Parlane, J	Attendance: 1,000; Referee: W Murray

26 December 1931 League	Dumbarton	3–0	St Johnstone	Boghead Park
	Parlane, W 14'; Parlane, J 60'; Shaw 65'			Attendance: 1,000; Referee: C McGreachan

2 January 1932 League	Dumbarton	2–3	East Stirling	Boghead Park
	Parlane, J 4'; Parlane, w 40'		McMillan 6'; Kemp 61'	Attendance: 1,500; Referee: J McCutcheon

9 January 1932 League	Armadale	0–0	Dumbarton	Volunteer Park, Armadale
				Referee: A Robertson

23 January 1932 League	Dumbarton	5–1	Montrose	Boghead Park
	Shaw; Young 15'; Liddell 16'; Hendry		White 33'	Attendance: 2,000; Referee: A Robertson

30 January 1932 League	Stenhousemuir	1–1	Dumbarton	Ochilview Park
	Mooney 46'		Lang	Referee: H McLachlan

6 February 1932 League	Dumbarton	3–1	Alloa Athletic	Boghead Park
	Parlane, J Parlane, W Nash (o.g.)		Shankley	Attendance: 2,000; Referee: W Smith

13 February 1932 League	Forfar Athletic	3–0	Dumbarton	Station Park, Forfar
	Lawie 4'; Pryde 9'; Borland 26'			Referee: J Leggatt

20 February 1932 League	Dumbarton	6–1	Raith Rovers	Boghead Park
	Parlane, J 9', 70'; Hendry 23'; Parlane, W 55'; Lang 81'		McDonough 84'	Attendance: 2,000; Referee: R Seith

27 February 1932 League	Dumbarton	2–2	Arbroath	Boghead Park
	Lang 1'; Collins 40'		Lowe 25', 62'	Attendance: 2,500; Referee: J Burdon

12 March 1932 League	Dumbarton	3–1	Albion Rovers	Boghead Park
	Young 5'; Parlane, J		Brown 18'	Attendance: 1,500; Referee: H McLachlan

19 March 1932 League	Hibernian	0–1	Dumbarton	Easter Road Stadium
			Collins 60'	Attendance: 2,000; Referee: W Jamieson

26 March 1932 League	Dumbarton	3–2	King's Park	Boghead Park
	Liddell 8'; Kelso 52'; Dunion		Temple 75' (pen.); McGhie	Attendance: 1,500; Referee: W Dawson

2 April 1932 League	Dumbarton	5–0	Queen of the South	Boghead Park
	Trialist; Young		Temple; McGhie	Attendance: 2,000; Referee: J Ramsay

4 April 1932 League	Dunfermline Athletic	2–0	Dumbarton	East End Park
	Goal			Attendance: 2,000

9 April 1932 League	Bo'ness	1–3	Dumbarton	Newtown Park, Bo'ness
	Junior 15'		Trialist 30'; Shaw 70'; Lang 85'	Attendance: 100; Referee: C McGreachan

16 April 1932 League	Dumbarton	3–2	East Fife	Boghead Park
	Collins 20'; Young 25'; Lang 50'		Lowery 70'; Liddell 87'	Attendance: 2,000; Referee: J Leggatt

== Scottish Cup ==
Dumbarton were knocked out in the first round by Hamilton.

16 January 1932 Cup R1	Hamilton	2–0	Dumbarton	Pittodrie Park
	McLaren 33', 70'			Attendance: 3,000; Referee: W Holburn

== Dumbartonshire Cup ==
Dumbarton retained the Dumbartonshire Cup, beating Vale Ocaba in the final over two legs.

5 December 1931 Final First Leg	Dumbarton	5–2	Vale Ocaba	Boghead Park
	Parlane, W Collins; Hodge; Lang		Goal	Attendance: 500

28 April 1932 Final Second Leg	Vale Ocaba	1–3 (3–8 agg.)	Dumbarton	Millburn Park
	Ferguson		Hendry; McNee; Shaw

== Friendlies ==
8 September 1931 Friendly	Vale Ocaba	2–4	Dumbarton	Millburn Park
	Cust; Good		Parlane, W McLachlan; Young

5 March 1932 Friendly	Dumbarton	1–5	Third Lanark	Boghead Park
	McNee		Dewar; McMillan; Lynas	Referee: J Burden

20 April 1932 Friendly	Dumbarton	2–0	Yoker	Boghead Park
	Hendry; Parlane, J

== Player statistics ==
No.	Pos	Nat	Player	Total		Second Division		Scottish Cup	
No.	Pos	Nat	Player	Apps	Goals	Apps	Goals	Apps	Goals
	GK	(Scotland) SCO	William Gilmour	38	0	37	0	1	0
	DF	(Ireland) EIR	Harry Chatton	35	0	34	0	1	0
	DF	(Scotland) SCO	Jim Kelso	35	3	34	3	1	0
	DF	(Scotland) SCO	Alex Parlane	16	0	16	0	0	0
	MF	(Scotland) SCO	Charles Ballantyne	22	0	21	0	1	0
	MF	(Scotland) SCO	Robert Hendry	22	4	21	4	1	0
	MF	(Scotland) SCO	George Hodge	4	0	4	0	0	0
	MF	(Scotland) SCO	James Liddell	23	2	22	2	1	0
	MF	(Scotland) SCO	Sam McNee	13	1	13	1	0	0
	MF	(Scotland) SCO	William Murray	4	0	4	0	0	0
	MF	(Scotland) SCO	Thomas Pye	10	0	10	0	0	0
	MF	(Scotland) SCO	James Robertson	10	0	10	0	0	0
	MF	(Scotland) SCO	Swan	4	0	4	0	0	0
	FW	(Scotland) SCO	William Buchanan	10	2	10	2	0	0
	FW	(Scotland) SCO	David Collins	22	4	22	4	0	0
	FW	(Scotland) SCO	Dunion	2	1	2	1	0	0
	FW	(Scotland) SCO	John Lang	35	10	34	10	1	0
	FW	(Scotland) SCO	Alistair McLachlan	7	2	7	2	0	0
	FW	(Scotland) SCO	Johnny Parlane	26	10	25	10	1	0
	FW	(Scotland) SCO	Willie Parlane	34	11	33	11	1	0
	FW	(Scotland) SCO	Norman Shaw	9	3	8	3	1	0
	FW	(Scotland) SCO	John Thomson	12	3	12	3	0	0
	FW	(Scotland) SCO	Andrew Young	32	10	31	10	1	0
	MF	(Scotland) SCO	Trialists	4	0	4	0	0	0

=== International Caps ===
Harry Chatton was selected to play for the Irish Free State national team against Spain on 31 December 1931.

In addition, Alex and Willie Parlane won their first and second caps respectively playing for Scotland Amateurs against Ireland on 23 January 1932.

=== Transfers ===
==== Players in ====
Player	From	Date
(Scotland) George Hodge	(Scotland) Helensburgh Hermitage	8 Jun 1931
(Scotland) David Collins	(Scotland) Dumbarton Fern	29 Jul 1931
(Scotland) John Thomson	(Scotland) Clydebank	1 Aug 1931
(Scotland) Robert Hendry	(Scotland)	4 Aug 1931
(Scotland) James Robertson	(Scotland) Old Kilpatrfick	5 Aug 1931
(Scotland) John Lang	(Scotland) Maryhill	7 Aug 1931
(Republic of Ireland) Harry Chatton	(Scotland) Hearts	14 Aug 1931
(Scotland) William Buchanan	(Scotland)	25 Sep 1931
(Scotland) James Liddell	(Scotland) Albion Rovers	5 Nov 1931
(Scotland) Charles Ballantyne	(Scotland) Old Kilpartick	19 Nov 1931
(Scotland) Sam McNee	(Scotland) Edinburgh City	21 Jan 1932
(Scotland) William Murray	(Scotland) Vale of Leven	7 May 1932

==== Players out ====
Player	To	Date
(Scotland) Daniel Muir	(Scotland) Freed	24 Jun 1931
(Scotland) Alistair McLachlan	(Scotland) St Bernards	29 Oct 1931
(Scotland) Thomas Pye	(Scotland) Freed	5 Feb 1932
(Republic of Ireland) Harry Chatton	(Scotland) Partick Thistle	28 Apr 1932
(Scotland) Johnny Granger	(Northern Ireland) Ards	
(Scotland) Johnny Haddow	(Scotland) King's Park	
(England) William Molloy	(England) Yeovil & Petters United (loan)	
(England) William Molloy	(England) Notts County (loan)	

In addition William Barrie, Stewart Lennie, James MacNish and John McNiven all played their last games in Dumbarton 'colours'.
