= 1934–35 Dumbarton F.C. season =

Dumbarton
1934–1935 season
- Stadium: Boghead Park, Dumbarton
- Scottish League Division Two: 16th
- Scottish Cup: Second Round
- Top goalscorer: League: Johnny Haddow (19); All: Johnny Haddow (23)
- Highest home attendance: 2,400
- Lowest home attendance: 500
- Average home league attendance: 1,100
Home colours

The 1934–35 season was the 58th Scottish football season in which Dumbarton competed at national level, entering the Scottish Football League and the Scottish Cup. In addition Dumbarton competed in the Dumbartonshire Cup.

== Scottish League ==
After the optimism of the previous season, Dumbarton's 13th season in a row in the Second Division was to prove unlucky as they slumped to finish 16th out of 18, with 22 points - 30 behind champions Third Lanark. During the season, a number of big defeats were suffered, conceding a 9, an 8 and 6 goals twice.

11 August 1934 League	Dumbarton	2–1	Arbroath	Boghead Park
	English 41'; Haddow 64'		Brand 61'	Attendance: 2,400; Referee: J McKay

18 August 1934 League	Dundee United	5–2	Dumbarton	Tannadice Park
	Gardiner; Smith; Hart		Haddow; Cumming	Attendance: 6,000; Referee: W Findlay

25 August 1934 League	Dumbarton	2–0	Brechin City	Boghead Park
	Pyper 40'; Haddow 48'			Attendance: 1,800; Referee: W McCulloch

1 September 1934 League	Stenhousemuir	6–1	Dumbarton	Ochilview Park
	Hart 3', 30'; Howie 6', 15'; Cowan (pen.)		Haddow	Referee: J Horsburgh

8 September 1934 League	Edinburgh City	3–2	Dumbarton	Marine Gardens
	Stephen 40'; McMeekin 77'; Wilson 90'		Pyper 12'; Wallace	Referee: W McCulloch

15 September 1934 League	Leith Athletic	2–1	Dumbarton	Marine Gardens
	McCormack; McGillivray		English	Attendance: 2,000

22 September 1934 League	Dumbarton	2–2	East Stirling	Boghead Park
	Miller 33'; Kennedy 36'		Duncan 75'	Attendance: 1,000; Referee: W Murray

29 September 1934 League	East Fife	9–1	Dumbarton	Bayview Park, Methil
	Gillies 5'; Cowan 9'; Scott		English	Attendance: 1,000; Referee: J Robertson

6 October 1934 League	Dumbarton	4–2	Cowdenbeath	Boghead Park
	Kennedy 23'; Wallace 61'		Hamill 18'; Newman 35'	Attendance: 500; Referee: R Carruthers

13 October 1934 League	Dumbarton	0–0	Alloa Athletic	Boghead Park
				Attendance: 800; Referee: H Humphrey

20 October 1934 League	Brechin City	1–4	Dumbarton	Glebe Park, Brechin
	Ritchie 27'		English 50'; Wallace 73'; Ballantyne 76', 82'	Referee: R Innes

27 October 1934 League	Dumbarton	1–2	Leith Athletic	Boghead Park
	Ritchie, G 46'		Meikleham 15'; O'Rawe	Attendance: 1,000

3 November 1934 League	King's Park	3–2	Dumbarton	Forthbank Park
	Laird 2'; Lang 20'; Hillan 72'		Haddow 67' 88'	Attendance: 1,000

10 November 1934 League	Dumbarton	1–1	Montrose	Boghead Park
	English 22'		Oliphant 47'	Attendance: 1,000; Referee: A Cockburn

17 November 1934 League	Third Lanark	4–2	Dumbarton	Cathkin Park
	Hay 21'; Lynas		Ballantyne 78'; Haddow (pen.)	Attendance: 2,000; Referee: W Murray

24 November 1934 League	Dumbarton	1–1	Forfar Athletic	Boghead Park
	Joyce 67'		Gabriel 8'	Attendance: 1,000; Referee: W Baxter

1 December 1934 League	Raith Rovers	4–2	Dumbarton	Starks Park
	Miller 20'; Fulton 67'; Denholm 83'		Haddow 22'; Wallace	Attendance: 1,000; Referee: J Grant

8 December 1934 League	St Bernard's	5–0	Dumbarton	Royal Gymnasium Ground
	Russell 20', 23'; Murray 48'			Attendance: 500; Referee: R Carruthers

15 December 1934 League	Dumbarton	1–4	St Bernard's	Boghead Park
	Speedie 5'		Murray 40'	Attendance: 800; Referee: J Mackay

22 December 1934 League	Dumbarton	2–0	Edinburgh City	Boghead Park
	Haddow			Attendance: 1,000; Referee: R Innes

29 December 1934 League	Dumbarton	2–1	Stenhousemuir	Boghead Park
	English 70'; Haddow 85'		Howie 47'	Attendance: 1,100

1 January 1935 League	Cowdenbeath	8–1	Dumbarton	Central Park, Cowdenbeath
	Watson 1'; Garland; Whitelaw (pen.); McCurley		Haddow	Referee: J Horsburgh

5 January 1935 League	Forfar Athletic	4–1	Dumbarton	Station Park, Forfar
	Wann 5'; Black, W 48', 61', 75'		Henderson 50'	Attendance: 1,100; Referee: J Yeaman

12 January 1935 League	Dumbarton	5–1	Dundee United	Boghead Park
	McDonald; Speedie 35', 50'; English		Masson	Attendance: 1,000; Referee: R Carruthers

19 January 1935 League	East Stirling	6–2	Dumbarton	Firs Park
	Brown 6' (pen.); Cameron; Thomson, A 30'		Moran; McDonald (pen.)	Attendance: 600; Referee: J Robertson

2 February 1935 League	Dumbarton	2–5	Morton	Boghead Park
	Ballantyne 4' 24' (pen.)		Benzie 19'; McGarry 80'; Collins	Attendance: 1,400; Referee: W Baxter

16 February 1935 League	Montrose	5–0	Dumbarton	Links Park
	Oliphant 15'; Allan 27'; Calder 55'; Hughes 56', 85'			Attendance: 500; Referee: J McKay

2 March 1935 League	Dumbarton	4–2	East Fife	Boghead Park
	Muir; Haddow 30'; Moran		Scott 48'	Attendance: 900; Referee: J Robertson

9 March 1935 League	Morton	3–2	Dumbarton	Cappielow Park
	Morton 44' (pen.); McGrath 55'; Calder 84'		Ballantyne; Haddow 30'	Attendance: 1,500; Referee: J Armour

16 March 1935 League	Alloa Athletic	4–1	Dumbarton	Recreation Park, Alloa
	Dugan 12'; Richardson 58'; Borland; Rutherford		Haddow	Attendance: 1,500; Referee: J Grant

23 March 1935 League	Dumbarton	4–2	King's Park	Boghead Park
	Speedie; Haddow (pen.) 80'		Bryce	Attendance: 1,000; Referee: J Welsh

30 March 1935 League	Arbroath	4–0	Dumbarton	Gayfield Park
	Carver 13', 81', 89'; McNab 15'			Attendance: 2,000; Referee: H McLachlan

5 April 1935 League	Dumbarton	0–1	Third Lanark	Boghead Park
			Hay 70'	Attendance: 1,000

13 April 1935 League	Dumbarton	3–4	Raith Rovers	Boghead Park
	Haddow 8'; Speedie 34'		Fulton 45'; Denholm 80'; Wilson 73'	Attendance: 900; Referee: J MacKay

== Scottish Cup ==
This season it was a second round exit, to First Division St Johnstone.

26 January 1935 Cup R1	Vale Ocaba	1–6	Dumbarton	Millburn Park
	McLean 21'		Haddow 12', 20', 37', 80'; English 27'; Speedie 30'	Attendance: 5,000; Referee: W Murray

9 February 1935 Cup R2	Dumbarton	4–0	St Johnstone	Muirton Park
	Ferguson 19', 20', 87'; Stewart 42'			Attendance: 6,034; Referee: D Reilly

== Dumbartonshire Cup ==
Dumbarton failed to regain the Dumbartonshire Cup, with amateur side Vale Ocaba retaining the trophy. Both games were held over until the start of the 1935–36 season.

4 September 1935 Final	Dumbarton	3–3	Vale Ocaba	Boghead Park
	Cameron; Watson; Taylor, A		Goal	Attendance: 1,000

11 September 1935 Final Replay	Vale Ocaba	4–1	Dumbarton	Millburn Park
	Goal		Haddow	Attendance: 2,000

== Player statistics ==
No.	Pos	Nat	Player	Total		Second Division		Scottish Cup	
No.	Pos	Nat	Player	Apps	Goals	Apps	Goals	Apps	Goals
	GK	(Scotland) SCO	Robert Kerr	3	0	3	0	0	0
	GK	(Scotland) SCO	Archibald Milliken	2	0	1	0	1	0
	GK	(Scotland) SCO	William Simpson	31	0	30	0	1	0
	DF	(Scotland) SCO	William Barrie	9	0	9	0	0	0
	DF	(Scotland) SCO	McCourt	3	0	3	0	0	0
	DF	(Scotland) SCO	William McDonald	30	2	29	2	1	0
	DF	(Scotland) SCO	Edwin Powell	15	0	13	0	2	0
	DF	(Scotland) SCO	John Rodger	12	0	12	0	0	0
	DF	(Scotland) SCO	Thomson	1	0	1	0	0	0
	DF	(Scotland) SCO	Martin Watson	24	0	22	0	2	0
	MF	(Scotland) SCO	Charles Ballantyne	28	6	27	6	1	0
	MF	(Scotland) SCO	Joyce	2	1	2	1	0	0
	MF	(Scotland) SCO	Robert Kyle	2	0	2	0	0	0
	MF	(Scotland) SCO	Hugh Moran	16	2	14	2	2	0
	MF	(Scotland) SCO	Rankin	1	0	1	0	0	0
	MF	(Scotland) SCO	Dick Ritchie	16	0	16	0	0	0
	MF	(Scotland) SCO	George Ritchie	10	1	10	1	0	0
	MF	(Scotland) SCO	George Taylor	13	0	12	0	1	0
	FW	(Scotland) SCO	Duncan Colquhoun	3	0	3	0	0	0
	FW	(Scotland) SCO	Thomas Cumming	2	1	2	1	0	0
	FW	(Scotland) SCO	Duffie	2	0	2	0	0	0
	FW	(Scotland) SCO	Richard English	29	8	27	7	2	1
	FW	(Scotland) SCO	Johnny Haddow	29	23	27	19	2	4
	FW	(Scotland) SCO	Robert Henderson	13	1	13	1	0	0
	FW	(Scotland) SCO	Matthew Kennedy	4	3	4	3	0	0
	FW	(Scotland) SCO	James McLeod	14	0	13	0	1	0
	FW	(Scotland) SCO	Allan Miller	2	1	2	1	0	0
	FW	(Scotland) SCO	James Muir	18	1	16	1	2	0
	FW	(Scotland) SCO	Angus Polson	1	0	1	0	0	0
	FW	(Scotland) SCO	John Pyper	8	2	8	2	0	0
	FW	(Scotland) SCO	Robert Speedie	19	9	17	8	2	1
	FW	(Scotland) SCO	John Wallace	32	5	30	5	2	0
	FW	(Scotland) SCO	Trialist	2	0	2	0	0	0

=== Transfers ===
==== Players in ====
Player	From	Date
(Scotland) Thomas Cumming	(Scotland) Morton	10 Jul 1934
(Scotland) Richard English	(Scotland)	12 Aug 1934
(Scotland) William McDonald	(Scotland) Brechin City	10 Aug 1934
(Scotland) Robert Henderson	(Republic of Ireland) Cork	29 Aug 1934
(Scotland) Matthew Kennedy	(Scotland) King's Park (loan)	7 Sep 1934
(Scotland) John Pyper	(Scotland) Brechin City	12 Sep 1934
(Scotland) William Barrie	(Northern Ireland) Glenavon	25 Oct 1934
(Scotland) Duncan Colquhoun	(Scotland) Raith Rovers	23 Nov 1934
(Scotland) James Muir	(England) Margate	13 Dec 1934
(Scotland) Angus Polson	(Scotland) Queen of the South (trialist)	13 Dec 1934
(Scotland) Edwin Powell	(Scotland) Stenhousemuir	14 Dec 1934
(Scotland) James McLeod	(Scotland) Kilmarnock	20 Dec 1934
(Scotland) John Rodger	(Scotland) Morton	20 Dec 1934
(Scotland) Robert Speedie	(Scotland) Dumbarton Harp	29 Dec 1934
(Scotland) Hugh Moran	(Scotland) Cowdenbeath	10 Jul 1934
(Scotland) Archibald Milliken	(Scotland) Dundee United	24 Jan 1935
(Scotland) George Taylor	(Scotland)	

==== Players out ====
Player	To	Date
(Scotland) David Collins	(Scotland) Freed	23 May 1934
(Scotland) William Barrie	(Scotland) Freed	26 Nov 1934
(Scotland) Dick Ritchie	(Scotland) Aberdeen	7 Dec 1934
(Scotland) Duncan Colquhoun	(Scotland) Freed	12 Dec 1934
(Scotland) George Ritchie	(Scotland) Freed	30 Jan 1935
(Scotland) Thomas McGunnigle	(Republic of Ireland) Cork	

In addition Thomas Cumming, John Forgie, David Kennedy, William Meek, William Murray, James Osborne and Robert Taylor all played their last games in Dumbarton 'colours'.
