= George Kyle =

Scottish footballer

Personal information
- Date of birth: 6 November 1908
- Place of birth: Dunfermline, Scotland
- Date of death: 1998 (aged 89)
- Position: Goalkeeper

Senior career*
Years	Team	Apps	(Gls)
- Lethans Heatherbell
–1928	Kelty Rangers		
1928–1930	East Stirlingshire	75	(0)
1930–1932	Cowdenbeath	7	
1931–1932	→ Dunfermline Athletic (loan)	10	(0)
1932–	Bangor City		
1935–1936	East Stirlingshire	39	(0)
- * Club domestic league appearances and goals

George A. Kyle (6 November 1908 – 1998) was a Scottish footballer who made over 110 appearances in the Scottish League for East Stirlingshire as a goalkeeper. He also played league football for Dunfermline Athletic and Cowdenbeath and also in Wales for Bangor City.

== Personal life ==
Kyle was the grandfather of footballer Ray Allan. As a territorial, after the outbreak of the Second World War in 1939, Kyle was called into the Fife and Forfar Yeomanry. He went to France as part of the BEF in January 1940 and was later evacuated from Dunkirk. Kyle rose to the rank of sergeant major and after the war he became an amateur entertainer in Fife. He was named Cowdenbeath's "Citizen of the Year" in 1983.

== Career statistics ==
Appearances and goals by club, season and competition
Club	Season	League			Scottish Cup		Total	
Club	Season	Division	Apps	Goals	Apps	Goals	Apps	Goals
East Stirlingshire	1928–29	Scottish Division Two	19	0	3	0	22	0
East Stirlingshire	1929–30	Scottish Division Two	37	0	1	0	38	0
East Stirlingshire	1930–31	Scottish Division Two	19	0	—		19	0
East Stirlingshire	Total		75	0	4	0	79	0
Cowdenbeath	1930–31	Scottish Division One	7	0	2	0	9	0
Dunfermline Athletic (loan)	1931–32	Scottish Division Two	10	0	0	0	10	0
East Stirlingshire	1934–35	Scottish Division Two	7	0	0	0	7	0
East Stirlingshire	1935–36	Scottish Division Two	32	0	1	0	33	0
East Stirlingshire	Total		114	0	5	0	119	0
Career total			131	0	7	0	138	0
