= 1929–30 Dumbarton F.C. season =

Dumbarton
1929–1930 season
- Manager: Donald Colman
- Stadium: Boghead Park, Dumbarton
- Scottish League Division Two: 16th
- Scottish Cup: First Round
- Top goalscorer: League: Johnny Haddow (21); All: Johnny Haddow (21)

The 1929–30 season was the 53rd Scottish football season in which Dumbarton competed at national level, entering the Scottish Football League and the Scottish Cup. In addition Dumbarton competed in the Dumbartonshire Cup.

== Scottish League ==
With just 5 wins to show for their efforts in the league campaign up to the new year, it was to prove yet another fruitless season for Dumbarton, their eighth season in a row in the Second Division, and in the end finished 16th out of 20, with 30 points - 27 behind champions Leith Athletic.

10 August 1929 League	Dumbarton	2–3	Leith Athletic	Boghead Park
	Haddow; Speedie		Nicol	Attendance: 2,500; Referee: A McInally

17 August 1929 League	Dunfermline Athletic	2–3	Dumbarton	East End Park
	Syme 10'; Patrick		Haddow 48', 89'; Fairley 52'	Attendance: 1,500; Referee: N Brown

24 August 1929 League	Dumbarton	1–2	Forfar Athletic	Boghead Park
	Haddow 70'		Newman 65', 71'	Attendance: 2,000; Referee: D Reilly

31 August 1929 League	Montrose	6–0	Dumbarton	Links Park
	Gentles 20', 30'; Breslin 38', 67'; White 54', 78'			Attendance: 2,000; Referee: J Leggat

7 September 1929 League	Dumbarton	1–2	Alloa Athletic	Boghead Park
	Brannan		Buchanan; Stoddart	Referee: J Prior

14 September 1929 League	East Fife	4–1	Dumbarton	Bayview Park, Methil
	Weir; McGachie; Nairn		Brannan	Attendance: 3,000; Referee: J Rowan

21 September 1929 League	Dumbarton	4–2	King's Park	Boghead Park
	Malloy 2', 20', 81'; Haddow 52'		Crickett 43'; Toner 47'	Attendance: 1,500; Referee: W McGuffog

28 September 1929 League	East Stirling	1–0	Dumbarton	Firs Park
	Renwick 22'			Referee: G Robertson

5 October 1929 League	Dumbarton	2–5	Bo'ness	Boghead Park
	Brannan 67'; Malloy 72'		McLaren 65'; Hutcheson; Hunter 75'	Attendance: 2,000; Referee: J Robertson

12 October 1929 League	Queen of the South	5–0	Dumbarton	Palmerston Park
	Newman 44'; McKenna; Hardie; Derby			Referee: W Jamieson

19 October 1929 League	Dumbarton	2–3	Raith Rovers	Boghead Park
	Shaw 15'; Brannan 65'		Beath 17'; Panther 45', 48'	Referee: W Murray

26 October 1929 League	Clydebank	1–2	Dumbarton	Clydeholm Park
	McNee		Kirk 20'; Malloy 50'	Referee: A McInally

2 November 1929 League	Stenhousemuir	5–0	Dumbarton	Ochilview Park
	Penman; Jack 23'; Hastings; Robertson; Scouller 75'			Referee: J Mackay

9 November 1929 League	Dumbarton	4–1	Brechin City	Boghead Park
	Haddow 30' (pen.); Parlane, W 41'; Malloy 50'; Speedie 80'		Cairns 70'	Referee: J Robertson

16 November 1929 League	Dumbarton	4–3	Third Lanark	Boghead Park
	Haddow (pen.) (pen.)Malloy		Jack	Attendance: 2,000; Referee: J Love

23 November 1929 League	Armadale	2–1	Dumbarton	Volunteer Park, Armadale
	Pettigrew 6', 15'		Haddow 5'	Referee: W Jamieson

30 November 1929 League	Dumbarton	1–2	Albion Rovers	Boghead Park
	Haddow 20' (pen.)		Harkins 10'; Cameron 25'	Referee: G McGreachan

7 December 1929 League	Dumbarton	1–4	Arbroath	Boghead Park
	Haddow 44'		Gallacher 58'; Jarvis 63', 85'; Mathewson 90'	Attendance: 1,000; Referee: J Robertson

14 December 1929 League	St Bernard's	5–0	Dumbarton	Royal Gymnasium Ground
	Forrest; Eadie; Morrison; Imrie			Attendance: 1,500; Referee: R Seith

21 December 1929 League	Leith Athletic	6–2	Dumbarton	Marine Gardens
	Young 32'; Johnston 44'; Robinson; Marshall		Haddow 52'; Shaw	Attendance: 2,000; Referee: G Robertson

28 December 1929 League	Dumbarton	1–3	Dunfermline Athletic	Boghead Park
	Muir 90' (pen.)		Syme 20' 57'; Gilfillan 81'	Referee: J Holland

1 January 1930 League	Dumbarton	1–3	Clydebank	Boghead Park
	Parlane, W		Walker 8'; Newman 40'; McCartney 90'

2 January 1930 League	Raith Rovers	1–2	Dumbarton	Starks Park
	Beath 25'		Trialist 45'; Hutcheson (o.g.)	Attendance: 6,000; Referee: G McCutcheon

4 January 1930 League	Forfar Athletic	1–2	Dumbarton	Station Park, Forfar
	Kilgour 10'		Haddow 40'; Trialist

11 January 1930 League	Dumbarton	2–2; VOID	Montrose	Boghead Park
	Trialist 3'; Shaw 8'		Breslin 18'; Gentles 51'	Referee: J Robertson

25 January 1930 League	Alloa Athletic	2–1	Dumbarton	Recreation Park, Alloa
	Hinds; McArthur 85'		Malloy 15'	Referee: A Robertson

1 February 1930 League	Dumbarton	6–3	East Fife	Boghead Park
	Swanson 1'; Stewart 25'; Malloy 48', 74'; Parlane, W Haddow 85' (pen.)		Herbert 4'; Barrett 46'; Liddell 60'	Referee: J Mackay

8 February 1930 League	King's Park	1–1	Dumbarton	Forthbank Park
	Dyet, J 15'		Malloy	Referee: W Jamieson

15 February 1930 League	Dumbarton	5–3	East Stirling	Boghead Park
	Shaw 3'; Haddow (pen.); Parlane, W Swanson		Renwick 8'; Saunders	Referee: J McCutcheon

22 February 1930 League	Bo'ness	3–1	Dumbarton	Newtown Park, Bo'ness
	Fleming 89'; Black 90'		Haddow	Attendance: 1,000; Referee: M Brown

1 March 1930 League	Dumbarton	4–0	Queen of the South	Boghead Park
	Parlane, W 46'; Swanson			Referee: H McLachlan

8 March 1930 League	Dumbarton	5–1	Stenhousemuir	Boghead Park
	Lennie 20'; Malloy 36'; Shaw 37'; Parlane, W 42'; Haddow		Docherty 55'	Attendance: 1,500; Referee: J Burdon

15 March 1930 League	Brechin City	1–0	Dumbarton	Glebe Park, Brechin
	Gunn 51'			Referee: J Leggat

22 March 1930 League	Third Lanark	2–2	Dumbarton	Cathkin Park
	Clark, B 15'; McLelland 78'		Swanson 30'; Malloy 75'

29 March 1930 League	Dumbarton	6–0	Armadale	Boghead Park
	Haddow 18' (pen.); Swanson 37', 85'; Parlane, W 51'; Swanson 55'; Stewart 69'			Referee: J Rowan

5 April 1930 League	Albion Rovers	2–0	Dumbarton	Cliftonhill
	Hart 46'; Harkins			Referee: J Rowan

7 April 1930 League	Dumbarton	3–1	Montrose	Boghead Park
	Malloy 20', 44'; Haddow		Breslin	Attendance: 1,100; Referee: J Robertson

12 April 1930 League	Arbroath	4–3	Dumbarton	Gayfield Park
	Mathewson 8'; Williamson 13' (pen.); Jarvis 34'; Gallacher 57'		Lennie 5'; Haddow 65'<vr>Parlane, W 75'	Attendance: 1,000; Referee: N Brown

19 April 1930 League	Dumbarton	3–0	St Bernard's	Boghead Park
	Haddow (pen.); Malloy 47'; Lennie			Attendance: 1,100; Referee: A McInally

== Scottish Cup ==
Dumbarton were knocked out in the first round by Cowdenbeath.

18 January 1930 Cup R1	Dumbarton	1–4	Cowdenbeath	Boghead Park
	Malloy 61'		Black 5'; Lindsay 54', 81', 89' (pen.)	Attendance: 3,676; Referee: H Morrison

== Dumbartonshire Cup ==
For the first time since 1923, Dumbarton won the Dumbartonshire Cup, beating Clydebank in the final.

29 April 1930 Final	Dumbarton	6–2	Clydebank	Boghead Park
	Malloy; Parlane, J Parlane.W		McCartney; Lennie (o.g.)	Attendance: 2,000; Referee: J Burdon

== Friendly ==
15 April 1930 Friendly	Dumbarton	5–1	Dumbartonshire Juveniles XI	Boghead Park
	Goal		Goal

== Player statistics ==
No.	Pos	Nat	Player	Total		Second Division		Scottish Cup	
No.	Pos	Nat	Player	Apps	Goals	Apps	Goals	Apps	Goals
	GK	(Scotland) SCO	Alex Fraser	24	0	23	0	1	0
	GK	(Scotland) SCO	Archibald McNish	9	0	9	0	0	0
	GK	(Scotland) SCO	John Thomson	6	0	6	0	0	0
	DF	(Scotland) SCO	Jim Kelso	38	0	37	0	1	0
	DF	(Scotland) SCO	William Livingstone	3	0	3	0	0	0
	DF	(Scotland) SCO	Daniel Muir	36	1	35	1	1	0
	MF	(Scotland) SCO	David Beattie	2	0	2	0	0	0
	MF	(Scotland) SCO	William Hyslop	5	0	5	0	0	0
	MF	(Scotland) SCO	Stewart Lennie	38	3	37	3	1	0
	MF	(Scotland) SCO	Alex McConnachie	1	0	1	0	0	0
	MF	(Scotland) SCO	Johnny Parlane	3	1	3	1	0	0
	MF	(Scotland) SCO	James Miller	34	0	33	0	1	0
	MF	(Scotland) SCO	James Stewart	27	2	26	2	1	0
	FW	(Scotland) SCO	James Brannan	16	4	16	4	0	0
	FW	(Scotland) SCO	Duffy	1	0	1	0	0	0
	FW	(Scotland) SCO	John Fairlie	8	1	8	1	0	0
	FW	(Scotland) SCO	Johnny Haddow	35	21	34	21	1	0
	FW	(Scotland) SCO	Angus Kerr	5	0	5	0	0	0
	FW	(Scotland) SCO	William Kirk	18	1	18	1	0	0
	FW	(Scotland) SCO	Archibald McLardie	9	0	9	0	0	0
	FW	(England) ENG	William Molloy	36	18	35	17	1	1
	FW	(Scotland) SCO	Willie Parlane	18	9	17	9	1	0
	FW	(Scotland) SCO	Norman Shaw	27	5	26	5	1	0
	FW	(Scotland) SCO	Smith	1	0	1	0	0	0
	FW	(Scotland) SCO	Robert Speedie	8	2	8	2	0	0
	FW	(Scotland) SCO	Benjamin Swanson	15	7	14	7	1	0
	FW	(Scotland) SCO	Trialists	6	0	6	0	0	0

=== Transfers ===
==== Players in ====
Player	From	Date
(Scotland) Stewart Lennie	(Scotland) Queen's Park	17 Jun 1929
(Scotland) James Kelso	(Scotland) Helensburgh Amateurs	21 Jun 1929
(Scotland) Angus Kerr	(Scotland)	24 Jun 1929
(Scotland) Archibald McNish	(Scotland)	27 Jul 1929
(Scotland) John Fairlie	(Scotland) Bathgate	30 Jul 1929
(Scotland) James Brannan	(Scotland) Croy Celtic	8 Aug 1929
(Scotland) William Hyslop	(Scotland)	27 Aug 1929
(Scotland) James Stewart	(Scotland) King's Park	8 Oct 1929
(Scotland) Norman Shaw	(Scotland) Stenhousemuir	11 Oct 1929
(Scotland) John Thomson	(Scotland)	24 Oct 1929
(Scotland) Alex Fraser	(Scotland) Montrose	10 Nov 1929
(Scotland) Alex McConnachie	(Scotland) Morton (loan)	22 Nov 1929
(Scotland) William Livingstone	(Scotland) Motherwell	14 Dec 1929
(Scotland) Willie Parlane	(Scotland) Hermitage FP	26 Dec 1929
(Scotland) David Beattie	(Scotland) loan	4 Feb 1930
(Scotland) Johnny Parlane		3 Apr 1930

==== Players out ====
Player	To	Date
(Scotland) James Crawford	(Scotland) St Bernards	8 Aug 1929
(Scotland) John Harvie	(Scotland) Clydebank	9 Aug 1929
(Scotland) Robert Orr	(Scotland) Clydebank	10 Sep 1929
(Scotland) Angus Kerr	(Scotland) Released	16 Oct 1929
(Scotland) John Thomson	(Scotland) Released	6 Nov 1929
(Scotland) John Fairlie	(Scotland) Queen of the South	1 Jan 1930
(Scotland) Angus Urquhart	(England) Manchester United	
(Scotland) Archibald Gillies	(Scotland) Freed	
(Scotland) Jock Bradford	(Scotland) Freed	
(Scotland) Hugh Reid	(Scotland) Freed	

In addition John Jackson and Alex McIssac all played their last games in Dumbarton 'colours'.
