= 1935–36 Dundee United F.C. season =

Dundee United
1935–36 season
- Manager: Jimmy Brownlie
- Stadium: Tannadice Park
- Scottish Football League Second Division: 7th W16 D5 L13 F108 A81 P37
- Scottish Cup: Round 2

The 1935–36 season was the 28th year of football played by Dundee United, and covers the period from 1 July 1935 to 30 June 1936.

== Match results ==
Dundee United played a total of 35 matches during the 1935–36 season.

=== Legend ===
Win
Draw
Loss

All results are written with Dundee United's score first. Own goals in italics

=== Second Division ===
Date	Opponent	Venue	Result	Attendance	Scorers
10 August 1935	St Bernard's	H	2–2	14,000	
17 August 1935	Alloa Athletic	A	3–2	2,000	
24 August 1935	King's Park	H	1–1	8,000	
31 August 1935	Brechin City	A	1–2	2,000	
7 September 1935	Falkirk	H	3–1	7,000	
14 September 1935	Raith Rovers	A	1–1	2,000	
21 September 1935	St Mirren	H	1–2	9,000	
28 September 1935	Dumbarton	A	3–5	1,000	
5 October 1935	Greenock Morton	H	1–1	6,000	
12 October 1935	Stenhousemuir	A	0–5	2,000	
19 October 1935	East Fife	H	4–2	2,000	
26 October 1935	Cowdenbeath	A	7–0	2,000	
2 November 1935	Forfar Athletic	H	4–1	5,000	
9 November 1935	Falkirk	A	2–4	3,000	
16 November 1935	Leith Athletic	A	1–3	900	
23 November 1935	Edinburgh City	H	4–1	4,000	
30 November 1935	Montrose	A	2–3	1,400	
7 December 1935	East Stirlingshire	A	3–2	500	
14 December 1935	Brechin City	H	2–2	2,000	
21 December 1935	St Mirren	A	2–6	5,500	
28 December 1935	Dumbarton	H	8–0	5,000	
1 January 1936	Greenock Morton	A	1–4	7,000	
4 January 1936	East Fife	A	3–4	4,000	
11 January 1936	St Bernard's	A	1–3	1,000	
18 January 1936	Raith Rovers	H	4–3	500	
1 February 1936	Alloa Athletic	H	4–0	2,500	
15 February 1936	King's Park	A	1–2	500	
29 February 1936	Montrose	H	2–3	2,000	
7 March 1936	Edinburgh City	A	6–3	300	
14 March 1936	Cowdenbeath	H	6–1	1,500	
28 March 1936	Stenhousemuir	H	6–1	1,000	
4 April 1936	Leith Athletic	H	8–2	1,000	
11 April 1936	Forfar Athletic	A	4–3	200	
13 April 1936	East Stirlingshire	H	12–1	400	

=== Scottish Cup ===
Date	Rd	Opponent	Venue	Result	Attendance	Scorers
25 January 1936	R1	Alloa Athletic	H	2–2	9,000	
29 January 1936	R1 R	Alloa Athletic	A	1–1	2,500	
3 February 1936	R1 2R	Alloa Athletic	H	2–1	3,379	
8 February 1936	R2	Cowdenbeath	A	3–5	5,500	
