= 1937–38 Dundee United F.C. season =

Dundee United
1937–38 season
- Manager: George Greig
- Stadium: Tannadice Park
- Scottish Football League Second Division: 14th W9 D5 L20 F69 A104 P23
- Scottish Cup: Round 2

Dundee United's 29th year of football was played from 1 July 1937 to 30 June 1938.

== Match results ==
Dundee United played a total of 36 matches during the 1937–38 season.

=== Legend ===
Win
Draw
Loss

All results are written with Dundee United's score first. Own goals in italics

=== Second Division ===
Date	Opponent	Venue	Result	Attendance	Scorers
14 August 1937	St Bernard's	H	1-7	1,500	
21 August 1937	Raith Rovers	A	2-4	3,000	
28 August 1937	Montrose	H	2-1	1,200	
4 September 1937	Dumbarton	A	1-5	2,000	
11 September 1937	Edinburgh City	H	5-2	1,000	
18 September 1937	Albion Rovers	A	1-4	3,000	
25 September 1937	Alloa Athletic	H	2-2	2,000	
2 October 1937	King's Park	A	4-4	1,000	
9 October 1937	Dunfermline Athletic	H	4-2	2,000	
16 October 1937	St Bernard's	A	0-3	2,000	
23 October 1937	East Stirlingshire	A	1-1	800	
30 October 1937	East Fife	H	0-2	3,000	
6 November 1937	Airdrieonians	A	3-4	3,000	
13 November 1937	Stenhousemuir	A	1-3	500	
20 November 1937	East Stirlingshire	H	6-1	200	
27 November 1937	Forfar Athletic	H	2-0	1,000	
4 December 1937	Montrose	A	3-1	1,000	
25 December 1937	Raith Rovers	H	4-4	3,000	
1 January 1938	Edinburgh City	A	2-0	600	
3 January 1938	Leith Athletic	H	3-4	2,000	
8 January 1938	King's Park	H	2-0	1,000	
15 January 1938	Forfar Athletic	A	3-4	600	
29 January 1938	Dumbarton	H	1-4	2,000	
5 February 1938	Cowdenbeath	A	1-3	2,000	
19 February 1938	Cowdenbeath	H	2-3	250	
26 February 1938	Alloa Athletic	A	4-2	1,500	
5 March 1938	Brechin City	A	0-3	1,000	
12 March 1938	Brechin City	H	3-4	300	
19 March 1938	Stenhousemuir	H	0-4	600	
26 March 1938	Leith Athletic	A	0-5	500	
16 April 1938	Dunfermline Athletic	A	0-2	500	
23 April 1938	Albion Rovers	H	1-4	2,000	
29 April 1938	East Fife	A	0-7	1,000	
30 April 1938	Airdrieonains	H	5-5	500	

=== Scottish Cup ===
Date	Rd	Opponent	Venue	Result	Attendance	Scorers
22 January 1938	R1	Heart of Midlothian	H	3-1	15,480	
12 February 1938	R2	East Fife	A	0-5	11,000	
