= 1936–37 Dundee United F.C. season =

Dundee United
1936–37 season
- Manager: Jimmy Brownlie (to October); George Greig (from October)
- Stadium: Tannadice Park
- Scottish Football League Second Division: 14th W9 D9 L16 F72 A97 P27
- Scottish Cup: Round 1

The 1936–37 season was the 29th year of football played by Dundee United and covers the period from 1 July 1936 to 30 June 1937.

== Match results ==
Dundee United played a total of 35 matches during the 1936–37 season.

=== Legend ===
Win
Draw
Loss

All results are written with Dundee United's score first. Own goals in italics

=== Second Division ===
Date	Opponent	Venue	Result	Attendance	Scorers
8 August 1936	King's Park	A	4–2	1,500	
15 August 1936	Brechin City	H	3–3	7,000	
22 August 1936	Airdrieonians	A	0–4	4,000	
29 August 1936	Raith Rovers	H	2–4	5,000	
5 September 1936	Morton	A	1–4	4,000	
12 September 1936	Dumbarton	H	1–1	1,500	
19 September 1936	Ayr United	A	1–4	6,000	
26 September 1936	Alloa Athletic	H	0–1	4,000	
3 October 1936	St Bernard's	A	0–3	2,500	
10 October 1936	Airdrieonians	H	2–1	2,000	
17 October 1936	Cowdenbeath	A	3–5	1,500	
24 October 1936	Montrose	H	5–1	1,500	
31 October 1936	East Stirlingshire	H	4–6	2,500	
7 November 1936	Raith Rovers	A	3–2	2,500	
14 November 1936	Forfar Athletic	H	5–0	2,500	
21 November 1936	Edinburgh City	H	2–2	2,000	
28 November 1936	Dumbarton	A	5–4	2,000	
5 December 1936	Leith Athletic	A	2–2	1,000	
12 December 1936	East Fife	H	0–0	4,000	
19 December 1936	Ayr United	H	1–2	3,000	
26 December 1936	Alloa Athletic	A	0–2	2,000	
1 January 1937	Greenock Morton	H	1–4	5,000	
2 January 1937	Brechin City	A	3–4	1,500	
9 January 1937	King's Park	H	3–3	2,000	
16 January 1937	Forfar Athletic	A	3–3	500	
23 January 1937	Stenhousemuir	H	3–2	3,500	
6 February 1937	East Fife	A	4–4	3,000	
20 February 1937	Cowdenbeath	H	1–1	2,500	
6 March 1937	Montrose	A	0–5	1,250	
20 March 1937	Leith Athletic	H	4–2	1,500	
27 March 1937	Edinburgh City	A	3–2	300	
3 April 1937	East Stirlingshire	A	1–2	200	
10 April 1937	St Bernard's	H	0–3	3,000	
16 April 1937	Stenhousemuir	A	2–9	300	

=== Scottish Cup ===
Date	Rd	Opponent	Venue	Result	Attendance	Scorers
30 January 1937	R1	Airdrieonians	A	1–3	3,000	
