= 1930–31 Heart of Midlothian F.C. season =

Heart of Midlothian
1930–31 season
- Manager: Willie McCartney
- Stadium: Tynecastle Park
- Scottish First Division: 5th
- Scottish Cup: Round 2

During the 1930–31 season Hearts competed in the Scottish First Division, the Scottish Cup and the East of Scotland Shield.

== Fixtures ==
=== Scottish Cup ===
| 17 January 1931 Scottish Cup R1 | Hearts | 9–1 | Stenhousemuir | Tynecastle Park |
| | | | | Attendance: 20,000 |

| 31 January 1931 Scottish Cup R2 | Kilmarnock | 3–2 | Hearts | Rugby Park |
| | | | | Attendance: 14,000 |

=== Scottish First Division ===
| 9 August 1930 Scottish First Division | Hearts | 0–4 | Hamilton Academical | Tynecastle Park |
| | | | | Attendance: 22,000 |

| 16 August 1930 Scottish First Division | Rangers | 4–1 | Hearts | Ibrox Park |
| | | | | Attendance: 40,000 |

| 23 August 1930 Scottish First Division | Hearts | 6–1 | East Fife | Tynecastle Park |
| | | | | Attendance: 16,500 |

| 30 August 1930 Scottish First Division | Kilmarnock | 0–1 | Hearts | Rugby Park |
| | | | | Attendance: 9,500 |

| 6 September 1930 Scottish First Division | Hearts | 2–4 | Morton | Tynecastle Park |
| | | | | Attendance: 19,500 |

| 13 September 1930 Scottish First Division | Clyde | 1–2 | Hearts | Shawfield Stadium |
| | | | | Attendance: 6,000 |

| 20 September 1930 Scottish First Division | Hearts | 4–1 | Hibernian | Tynecastle Park |
| | | | | Attendance: 23,000 |

| 27 September 1930 Scottish First Division | Aberdeen | 2–1 | Hearts | Pittodrie Park |
| | | | | Attendance: 13,000 |

| 4 October 1930 Scottish First Division | Hearts | 2–1 | Cowdenbeath | Tynecastle Park |
| | | | | Attendance: 19,000 |

| 11 October 1930 Scottish First Division | Falkirk | 0–3 | Hearts | Tynecastle Park |
| | | | | Attendance: 8,000 |

| 18 October 1930 Scottish First Division | Hearts | 5–2 | Leith Athletic | Tynecastle Park |
| | | | | Attendance: 10,000 |

| 25 October 1930 Scottish First Division | Ayr United | 1–1 | Hearts | Somerset Park |
| | | | | Attendance: 5,000 |

| 1 November 1930 Scottish First Division | Hearts | 1–1 | Cowdenbeath | Tynecastle Park |
| | | | | Attendance: 11,000 |

| 8 November 1930 Scottish First Division | Celtic | 2–1 | Hearts | Celtic Park |
| | | | | Attendance: 12,000 |

| 15 November 1930 Scottish First Division | Hearts | 5–1 | Motherwell | Tynecastle Park |
| | | | | Attendance: 24,000 |

| 22 November 1930 Scottish First Division | Dundee | 1–3 | Hearts | Dens Park |
| | | | | Attendance: 10,000 |

| 29 November 1930 Scottish First Division | Hearts | 3–1 | St Mirren | Tynecastle Park |
| | | | | Attendance: 20,500 |

| 6 December 1930 Scottish First Division | Partick Thistle | 2–1 | Hearts | Firhill Park |
| | | | | Attendance: 25,000 |

| 13 December 1930 Scottish First Division | Hearts | 6–3 | Airdrieonians | Tynecastle Park |
| | | | | Attendance: 17,500 |

| 20 December 1930 Scottish First Division | Hamilton Academical | 3–2 | Hearts | Douglas Park |
| | | | | Attendance: 10,000 |

| 27 December 1930 Scottish First Division | Hearts | 3–0 | Rangers | Tynecastle Park |
| | | | | Attendance: 37,000 |

| 1 January 1931 Scottish First Division | Hibernian | 2–2 | Hearts | Easter Road |
| | | | | Attendance: 20,000 |

| 3 January 1931 Scottish First Division | East Fife | 1–0 | Hearts | Bayview Park |
| | | | | Attendance: 8,000 |

| 5 January 1931 Scottish First Division | Hearts | 3–2 | Aberdeen | Tynecastle Park |
| | | | | Attendance: 8,500 |

| 10 January 1931 Scottish First Division | Hearts | 1–4 | Kilmarnock | Tynecastle Park |
| | | | | Attendance: 15,000 |

| 24 January 1931 Scottish First Division | Morton | 2–4 | Hearts | Tynecastle Park |
| | | | | Attendance: 6,000 |

| 11 February 1931 Scottish First Division | Queen's Park | 1–2 | Hearts | Hampden Park |
| | | | | Attendance: 4,000 |

| 18 February 1931 Scottish First Division | Hearts | 4–2 | Falkirk | Tynecastle Park |
| | | | | Attendance: 5,500 |

| 21 February 1931 Scottish First Division | Leith Athletic | 2–1 | Hearts | Marine Gardens |
| | | | | Attendance: 15,000 |

| 28 February 1931 Scottish First Division | Hearts | 9–0 | Ayr United | Tynecastle Park |
| | | | | Attendance: 11,000 |

| 7 March 1931 Scottish First Division | Cowdenbeath | 2–2 | Hearts | Central Park |
| | | | | Attendance: 3,000 |

| 18 March 1931 Scottish First Division | Hearts | 1–1 | Celtic | Tynecastle Park |
| | | | | Attendance: 28,000 |

| 21 March 1931 Scottish First Division | Motherwell | 2–0 | Hearts | Fir Park |
| | | | | Attendance: 5,000 |

| 28 March 1931 Scottish First Division | Hearts | 0–3 | Clyde | Tynecastle Park |
| | | | | Attendance: 11,500 |

| 4 April 1931 Scottish First Division | Hearts | 2–0 | Dundee | Tynecastle Park |
| | | | | Attendance: 11,500 |

| 11 April 1931 Scottish First Division | St Mirren | 0–3 | Hearts | St Mirren Park, Love Street |
| | | | | Attendance: 6,000 |

| 18 April 1931 Scottish First Division | Hearts | 1–2 | Partick Thistle | Tynecastle Park |
| | | | | Attendance: 9,500 |

| 25 April 1931 Scottish First Division | Airdrieonians | 2–2 | Hearts | Broomfield Park |
| | | | | Attendance: 1,500 |

== See also ==
- List of Heart of Midlothian F.C. seasons
