= 1938–39 Dundee United F.C. season =

Dundee United
1938–39 season
- Manager: Jimmy Brownlie; Sam Irving
- Stadium: Tannadice Park
- Scottish Football League Second Division: 9th W15 D3 L16 F78 A69 P33
- Scottish Cup: Round 2

The 1938–39 season was the 30th year of football played by Dundee United, and covers the period from 1 July 1938 to 30 June 1939.

== Match results ==
Dundee United played a total of 36 matches during the 1938–39 season.

=== Legend ===
Win
Draw
Loss

All results are written with Dundee United's score first. Own goals in italics

=== Second Division ===
Date	Opponent	Venue	Result	Attendance	Scorers
13 August 1938	Montrose	A	5-4	1,200	
20 August 1938	Cowdenbeath	H	1-4	8,500	
27 August 1938	Airdrieonians	A	0-1	2,000	
3 September 1938	Alloa Athletic	H	1-0	5,000	
10 September 1938	East Fife	A	2-3	4,000	
17 September 1938	Dundee	H	3-0	12,000	
24 September 1938	Dumbarton	A	0-1	4,000	
1 October 1938	King's Park	H	2-1	3,000	
8 October 1938	St Bernard's	A	3-5	2,000	
15 October 1938	Dunfermline Athletic	A	0-3	4,000	
22 October 1938	Greenock Morton	H	1-0	5,000	
29 October 1938	Stenhousemuir	H	2-1	5,500	
5 November 1938	East Stirlingshire	A	3-3	1,500	
12 November 1938	St Bernard's	H	5-2	4,000	
19 November 1938	Airdrieonians	H	1-2	4,000	
26 November 1938	Brechin City	A	2-2	1,000	
3 December 1938	Leith Athletic	A	2-0	1,000	
10 December 1938	Dumbarton	H	4-2	3,000	
17 December 1938	Forfar Athletic	A	1-2	1,000	
24 December 1938	Brechin City	H	1-0	4,000	
31 December 1938	Cowdenbeath	A	2-2	3,000	
2 January 1938	East Fife	H	2-5	12,000	
14 January 1939	Dunfermline Athletic	H	1-0	4,000	
28 January 1939	Alloa Athletic	A	0-3	2,500	
11 February 1939	Edinburgh City	H	1-3	800	
25 February 1939	Edinburgh City	A	3-2	500	
4 March 1939	Forfar Athletic	H	6-0	1,000	
11 March 1939	Leith Athletic	H	6-1	500	
18 March 1939	Dundee	A	0-2	12,500	
25 March 1939	East Stirlingshire	H	10-0	500	
1 April 1939	King's Park	A	2-3	1,000	
8 April 1939	Greenock Morton	A	4-3	3,000	
22 April 1939	Montrose	H	3-5	1,000	
29 April 1939	Stenhousemuir	A	0-3	200	

=== Scottish Cup ===
Date	Rd	Opponent	Venue	Result	Attendance	Scorers
21 January 1939	R1	Stenhousemuir	H	2-0	7,000	
4 February 1939	R2	Motherwell	H	1-5	11,346	
