= 1932–33 Dundee United F.C. season =

Dundee United
1932–33 season
- Manager: Willie Reid
- Stadium: Tannadice Park
- Scottish Football League Second Division: 13th W14 D4 L17 F68 A72 P32
- Scottish Cup: Round 2

The 1932–33 season was the 27th year of football played by Dundee United, and covers the period from 1 July 1932 to 30 June 1933.

== Match results ==
Dundee United played a total of 37 matches during the 1932–33 season.

=== Legend ===
Win
Draw
Loss

All results are written with Dundee United's score first. Own goals in italics

=== Second Division ===
Date	Opponent	Venue	Result	Attendance	Scorers
13 August 1932	Hibernian	A	0–2	10,000	
20 August 1932	Stenhousemuir	H	2–1	4,000	
24 August 1932	East Fife	A	0–1	2,000	
27 August 1932	Raith Rovers	A	1–4	4,000	
3 September 1932	Alloa Athletic	H	1–1	1,000	
10 September 1932	Queen of the South	A	0–1	3,000	
14 September 1932	Arbroath	H	2–1	2,000	
17 September 1932	Dumbarton	H	5–2	1,500	
24 September 1932	Armadale	A	5–3	700	
1 October 1932	St Bernard's	H	1–0	1,000	
8 October 1932	Forfar Athletic	A	1–4	600	
15 October 1932	Montrose	H	3–1	1,500	
22 October 1932	Dunfermline Athletic	H	2–4	1,000	
29 October 1932	King's Park	A	2–7	400	
5 November 1932	East Fife	H	3–3	2,000	
12 November 1932	Arbroath	A	0–0	2,000	
19 November 1932	Edinburgh City	A	1–1	300	
26 November 1932	Leith Athletic	A	1–2	2,000	
3 December 1932	Albion Rovers	H	2–0	1,000	
10 December 1932	Brechin City	H	3–1	2,000	
17 December 1932	Albion Rovers	A	2–4	1,000	
24 December 1932	Hibernian	H	0–2	3,500	
31 December 1932	Stenhousemuir	A	1–2	2,500	
2 January 1933	Queen of the South	H	1–2	2,500	
3 January 1933	Dumbarton	A	0–2	2,000	
7 January 1933	Raith Rovers	H	2–1	1,600	
14 January 1933	Alloa Athletic	A	0–1	1,500	
11 February 1933	St Bernard's	A	2–3	400	
25 February 1933	Forfar Athletic	H	4–1	200	
4 March 1933	Montrose	A	0–3	1,000	
11 March 1933	Dunfermline Athletic	A	1–5	2,000	
18 March 1933	Kings's Park	H	7–3	500	
25 March 1933	Edinburgh City	H	5–0	300	
8 April 1933	Leith Athletic	H	4–3	500	
22 April 1933	Brechin City	A	3–1	500	

=== Scottish Cup ===
Date	Rd	Opponent	Venue	Result	Attendance	Scorers
21 January 1933	R1	Armadale	A	2–0	1,000	
4 February 1933	R2	St Johnstone	H	3–4	19,513	
