= 1934–35 Dundee United F.C. season =

Dundee United
1934–35 season
- Manager: Jimmy Brownlie
- Stadium: Tannadice Park
- Scottish Football League Second Division: 4th W18 D6 L10 F105 A65 P42
- Scottish Cup: Round 3

The 1934–35 season was the 28th year of football played by Dundee United, and covers the period from 1 July 1934 to 30 June 1935.

== Match results ==
Dundee United played a total of 35 matches during the 1934–35 season.

=== Legend ===
Win
Draw
Loss

All results are written with Dundee United's score first. Own goals in italics

=== Second Division ===
Date	Opponent	Venue	Result	Attendance	Scorers
11 August 1934	Forfar Athletic	A	4–3	1,000	
18 August 1934	Dumbarton	H	5–2	4,000	
25 August 1934	Third Lanark	A	0–5	3,000	
1 September 1934	Raith Rovers	H	4–0	7,000	
8 September 1934	King's Park	A	1–3	2,000	
15 September 1934	Montrose	H	4–3	4,000	
22 September 1934	St Bernard's	A	0–1	1,000	
29 September 1934	Alloa Athletic	H	2–0	3,000	
6 October 1934	Greenock Morton	A	3–3	3,000	
13 October 1934	Third Lanark	H	0–2	6,000	
20 October 1934	Cowdenbeath	H	0–2	3,500	
27 October 1934	Brechin City	A	8–0	1,000	
3 November 1934	Arbroath	H	3–2	4,000	
10 November 1934	East Fife	A	1–1	1,500	
17 November 1934	Leith Athletic	H	2–2	3,000	
24 November 1934	Cowdenbeath	A	0–1	1,200	
28 November 1934	Edinburgh City	H	9–6	2,000	
8 December 1934	King's Park	H	2–1	6,000	
15 December 1934	Edinburgh City	A	8–2	85	
22 December 1934	Brechin City	H	9–2	2,500	
29 December 1934	Alloa Athletic	A	3–3	2,000	
1 January 1935	Greenock Morton	H	4–1	6,000	
5 January 1935	East Fife	H	4–0	5,000	
12 January 1935	Dumbarton	A	1–5	1,000	
19 January 1935	Forfar Athletic	H	5–3	5,000	
2 February 1935	Arbroath	A	2–2	7,000	
16 February 1935	St Bernard's	H	3–3	6,000	
2 March 1935	Raith Rovers	A	3–0	1,000	
9 March 1935	East Stirlingshire	A	2–1	1,500	
16 March 1935	Stenhousemuir	H	8–0	5,500	
23 March 1935	Montrose	A	1–2	1,500	
30 March 1935	East Stirlingshire	H	4–0	2,000	
12 April 1935	Stenhousemuir	A	2–3	300	
20 April 1935	Leith Athletic	A	0–4	500	

=== Scottish Cup ===
Date	Rd	Opponent	Venue	Result	Attendance	Scorers
26 January 1935	R1	Fraserburgh	A	6–2	1,500	
9 February 1935	R2	Queen's Park	H	6–3	21,623	
23 February 1935	R3	Heart of Midlothian	A	2–2	29,682	
27 February 1935	R3 R	Heart of Midlothian	H	2–4	22,266	
