= 1933–34 Dundee United F.C. season =

Dundee United
1933–34 season
- Manager: Willie Reid
- Stadium: Tannadice Park
- Scottish Football League Second Division: 17th W10 D4 L20 F81 A88 P24
- Scottish Cup: Round 1

The 1933–34 season was the 28th year of football played by Dundee United, and covers the period from 1 July 1933 to 30 June 1934.

== Match results ==
Dundee United played a total of 35 matches during the 1933–34 season.

=== Legend ===
Win
Draw
Loss

All results are written with Dundee United's score first. Own goals in italics

=== Second Division ===
| Date | Opponent | Venue | Result | Attendance | Scorers |
|---|---|---|---|---|---|
| 12 August 1933 | East Fife | H | 1–3 | 4,000 | |
| 19 August 1933 | Alloa Athletic | A | 2–1 | 1,500 | |
| 26 August 1933 | Forfar Athletic | H | 0–3 | 3,000 | |
| 2 September 1933 | Dumbarton | A | 2–4 | 1,500 | |
| 9 September 1933 | Greenock Morton | H | 0–2 | 2,000 | |
| 16 September 1933 | St Bernard's | A | 0–3 | 3,000 | |
| 23 September 1933 | East Stirlingshire | H | 2–2 | 600 | |
| 30 September 1933 | Montrose | A | 2–0 | 1,200 | |
| 7 October 1933 | Stenhousemuir | H | 2–4 | 700 | |
| 14 October 1933 | King's Park | A | 2–5 | 3,000 | |
| 21 October 1933 | Brechin City | A | 2–4 | 1,400 | |
| 26 October 1933 | Dunfermline Athletic | H | 4–2 | 800 | |
| 4 November 1933 | Albion Rovers | A | 3–4 | 1,000 | |
| 11 November 1933 | Montrose | H | 1–2 | 2,000 | |
| 18 November 1933 | Edinburgh City | H | 9–3 | 1,000 | |
| 25 November 1933 | Alloa Athletic | H | 2–0 | 400 | |
| 2 December 1933 | Raith Rovers | A | 1–4 | 1,000 | |
| 9 December 1933 | Leith Athletic | A | 5–1 | 2,000 | |
| 16 December 1933 | Arbroath | H | 4–4 | 7,000 | |
| 23 December 1933 | East Fife | A | 1–5 | 1,000 | |
| 30 December 1933 | Dumbarton | H | 4–4 | 2,000 | |
| 1 January 1934 | Greenock Morton | A | 3–4 | 4,000 | |
| 6 January 1934 | St Bernard's | H | 4–1 | 500 | |
| 13 January 1934 | Brechin City | H | 0–1 | 3,000 | |
| 27 January 1934 | Arbroath | A | 2–4 | 2,000 | |
| 10 February 1934 | Edinburgh City | A | 1–2 | 200 | |
| 3 March 1934 | King's Park | H | 8–1 | 1,000 | |
| 10 March 1934 | Leith Athletic | H | 5–2 | 2,500 | |
| 17 March 1934 | Stenhousemuir | A | 0–2 | 500 | |
| 24 March 1934 | Dunfermline Athletic | A | 0–1 | 3,000 | |
| 31 March 1934 | Forfar Athletic | A | 1–4 | 300 | |
| 7 April 1934 | East Stirlingshire | A | 1–1 | 400 | |
| 21 April 1934 | Raith Rovers | H | 5–2 | 800 | |
| 28 April 1934 | Albion Rovers | H | 2–3 | 8,700 | |

=== Scottish Cup ===
| Date | Rd | Opponent | Venue | Result | Attendance | Scorers |
|---|---|---|---|---|---|---|
| 20 January 1934 | R1 | Alloa Athletic | A | 2–4 | 3,021 | |
