= David Beatty =

David Beatty, Beattie, or Beaty may refer to:

- David Beatty, 1st Earl Beatty (1871–1936), British admiral
- David Beatty, 2nd Earl Beatty (1905–1972), British politician, eldest son of the 1st Earl Beatty
- David Beatty, 3rd Earl Beatty (born 1946), eldest son of the 2nd Earl Beatty
- David L. Beatty (1798–1881), American politician, fifth mayor of Louisville, Kentucky (1841–1844)
- David R. Beatty (born 1942), Canadian businessman
- David Beattie (1924–2001), 14th Governor-General of New Zealand (1980–1985)
- David Beattie (businessman) (born 1955), chairman of Partick Thistle F.C. and Chief Executive of Enterprise Foods Ltd.
- David Beattie (footballer) (1903–?), Scottish footballer
- David Beaty (American football) (born 1970), American football coach

== See also ==
- David Beaty (disambiguation)
