= 1931–32 Dundee United F.C. season =

Dundee United
1931–32 season
- Manager: Willie Reid
- Stadium: Tannadice Park
- Scottish Football League First Division: 19th W6 D7 L25 F40 A118 P19
- Scottish Cup: Round 3
Home colours

The 1931–32 season was the 26th year of football played by Dundee United, and covers the period from 1 July 1931 to 30 June 1932.

== Match results ==
Dundee United played a total of 44 matches during the 1931–32 season.

=== Legend ===
Win
Draw
Loss

All results are written with Dundee United's score first. Own goals in italics

=== First Division ===
Date	Opponent	Venue	Result	Attendance	Scorers
8 August 1931	Heart of Midlothian	H	0–2	8,000	
15 August 1931	Celtic	A	2–3	9,000	
18 August 1931	Queen's Park	A	2–1	6,000	
22 August 1931	Partick Thistle	H	3–1	9,500	
26 August 1931	Morton	A	2–4	4,000	
29 August 1931	Airdrieonians	A	2–4	4,000	
31 August 1931	Clyde	A	1–4	4,000	
5 September 1931	Cowdenbeath	H	0–0	6,000	
9 September 1931	Kilmarnock	H	0–0	8,000	
12 September 1931	Dundee	A	1–1	17,000	
19 September 1931	St Mirren	H	1–0	7,000	
26 September 1931	Ayr United	A	0–2	4,000	
3 October 1931	Third Lanark	H	3–2	7,000	
10 October 1931	Motherwell	A	0–5	4,000	
17 October 1931	Aberdeen	A	2–5	10,000	
24 October 1931	Leith Athletic	H	0–0	5,000	
31 October 1931	Rangers	A	0–5	15,000	
7 November 1931	Falkirk	H	2–2	3,000	
14 November 1931	Hamilton Academical	A	2–4	2,000	
21 November 1931	Queen's Park	H	0–5	5,000	
28 November 1931	Morton	H	3–4	2,500	
5 December 1931	Clyde	H	1–1	2,500	
12 December 1931	Kilmarnock	A	0–8	5,000	
19 December 1931	Heart of Midlothian	A	0–5	10,667	
26 December 1931	Celtic	H	1–0	12,000	
1 January 1932	Cowdenbeath	A	1–1	4,000	
2 January 1932	Dundee	H	0–3	16,000	
9 January 1932	Partick Thistle	A	0–3	4,000	
23 January 1932	Airdrieonians	H	2–7	6,000	
6 February 1932	Ayr United	H	1–2	5,000	
20 February 1932	Motherwell	H	1–6	6,000	
27 February 1932	Aberdeen	H	0–4	4,000	
5 March 1932	Leith Athletic	A	5–1	500	
12 March 1932	Rangers	H	0–5	7,000	
19 March 1932	Falkirk	A	0–4	5,000	
2 April 1932	Third Lanark	A	1–4	5,000	
9 April 1932	St Mirren	A	1–5	1,000	
16 April 1932	Hamilton Academical	H	0–5	200	

=== Scottish Cup ===
Date	Rd	Opponent	Venue	Result	Attendance	Scorers
16 January 1932	R1	Hibernian	A	3–2	14,340	
30 January 1932	R2	Queen of the South	A	2–2	8,111	
3 February 1932	R2 R	Queen of the South	H	1–1	11,902	
8 February 1932	R2 2R	Queen of the South	A	2–1	13,000	
13 February 1932	R3	Kilmarnock	H	1–1	12,969	
17 February 1932	R3 R	Kilmarnock	A	0–3	9,410	
