= 1932–33 Scottish Division Two =

Scottish Second Division
- Season: 1932–33
- Champions: Hibernian
- Promoted: Hibernian; Queen of the South

The 1932–33 Scottish Second Division was won by Hibernian who, along with second placed Queen of the South, were promoted to the First Division. Armadale and Bo'ness were expelled after they were unable to complete all their games, with their records being expunged.

== Table ==
Pos	Team	Pld	W	D	L	GF	GA	GD	Pts	Promotion or relegation
1	Hibernian	37	28	4	5	99	33	+66	60	Promotion to the 1933–34 First Division
2	Queen of the South	35	21	9	5	103	59	+44	51	Promotion to the 1933–34 First Division
3	Dunfermline Athletic	35	21	7	7	98	45	+53	49	
4	Stenhousemir	36	20	6	10	74	62	+12	46	
5	Albion Rovers	35	20	2	13	85	59	+26	42	
6	Raith Rovers	36	18	4	14	90	69	+21	40	
7	Alloa Athletic	37	16	6	15	70	60	+10	38	
8	Dumbarton	36	16	6	14	77	69	+8	38	
9	East Fife	35	16	4	15	93	72	+21	36	
10	St Bernard's	35	14	6	15	73	67	+6	34	
11	King's Park	34	13	8	13	85	80	+5	34	
12	Arbroath	34	14	5	15	65	62	+3	33	
13	Dundee United	35	14	4	17	68	72	−4	32	
14	Forfar Athletic	35	13	4	18	71	89	−18	30	
15	Brechin City	36	12	4	20	71	101	−30	28	
16	Leith Athletic	36	10	6	20	46	85	−39	26	
17	Montrose	35	9	5	21	66	90	−24	23	
18	Edinburgh City	36	5	4	27	44	138	−94	14	
19	Armadale	0	0	0	0	0	0	0	0	Expelled (Note: Armadale & Bo'ness were expelled for failing to meet match guarantees; their records were expunged.)
20	Bo'ness	0	0	0	0	0	0	0	0	Expelled
