= 1933–34 Scottish Division Two =

Scottish Second Division
- Season: 1933–34
- Champions: Albion Rovers
- Promoted: Albion Rovers; Dunfermline Athletic

The 1933–34 Scottish Second Division was the second-tier football league in Scotland. The competition was won by Albion Rovers, who, along with second placed Dunfermline Athletic, were promoted to the First Division. Edinburgh City finished bottom of the league table.

== Table ==
Pos	Team	Pld	W	D	L	GF	GA	GD	Pts	Promotion or relegation
1	Albion Rovers	34	20	5	9	74	47	+27	45	Promotion to the 1934–35 First Division
2	Dunfermline Athletic	34	20	4	10	90	52	+38	44	Promotion to the 1934–35 First Division
3	Arbroath	34	20	4	10	83	53	+30	44	
4	Stenhousemir	34	18	4	12	70	73	−3	40	
5	Morton	34	17	5	12	67	64	+3	39	
6	Dumbarton	34	17	3	14	67	68	−1	37	
7	King's Park	34	14	8	12	78	70	+8	36	
8	Raith Rovers	34	15	5	14	71	55	+16	35	
9	East Stirlingshire	34	14	7	13	65	74	−9	35	
10	St Bernard's	34	15	4	15	75	56	+19	34	
11	Forfar Athletic	34	13	7	14	77	71	+6	33	
12	Leith Athletic	34	12	8	14	63	60	+3	32	
13	East Fife	34	12	8	14	71	76	−5	32	
14	Brechin City	34	13	5	16	60	70	−10	31	
15	Alloa Athletic	34	11	9	14	55	68	−13	31	
16	Montrose	34	11	4	19	53	81	−28	26	
17	Dundee United	34	10	4	20	81	88	−7	24	
18	Edinburgh City	34	4	6	24	37	111	−74	14	

Source: "1933-1934 Division 2 - SPFL Archive". SPFL (in Malay).
