= David Beaty =

David Beaty may refer to:

- David Beaty (businessman) (1811–1889), American who discovered oil at his home in Warren, Pennsylvania
- David Beaty (author) (1911–1999), British writer, pilot and psychologist
- David Beaty (American football) (born 1970), American football coach

== See also ==
- David Beatty (disambiguation)
