= Ray Allan =

Scottish footballer (born 1955)

Personal information
- Full name: Raymond George Kyle Allan
- Date of birth: 5 March 1955 (age 71)
- Place of birth: Cowdenbeath, Scotland
- Position: Goalkeeper

Youth career
- Townhill
- –1971: Woodmill

Senior career*
Years	Team	Apps	(Gls)
1971–1972	Glenrothes		
1972	Alloa Athletic	1	(0)
1972–1975	Cowdenbeath	58	(0)
1975–1979	Glenrothes		
1976	Cowdenbeath	1	(0)
1979–1989	Cowdenbeath	363	(0)
1989–1991	Forfar Athletic	66	(0)
1991–1994	Brechin City	74	(0)
1994	Motherwell	0	(0)
1994–1995	Raith Rovers	1	(0)
1995–1997	Brechin City	45	(0)

International career
1977	Scotland Juniors	1	(0)
- * Club domestic league appearances and goals

Raymond George Kyle Allan (born 5 March 1955) is a Scottish retired footballer who made over 420 appearances in the Scottish League for Cowdenbeath as a goalkeeper. He is Cowdenbeath's record appearance-maker and was capped by Scotland at junior level.

== Personal life ==
Allan is the grandson of footballer George Kyle.

== Career statistics ==
Appearances and goals by club, season and competition
Club	Season	League			National Cup		League Cup		Europe		Other		Total	
Club	Season	Division	Apps	Goals	Apps	Goals	Apps	Goals	Apps	Goals	Apps	Goals	Apps	Goals
Alloa Athletic	1971–72	Scottish Second Division	1	0	—		—		—		—		1	0
Forfar Athletic	1989–90	Scottish First Division	32	0	1	0	—		—		—		33	0
Forfar Athletic	1990–91	Scottish First Division	34	0	1	0	1	0	—		1 (Note: Appearance in Scottish Challenge Cup)	0	37	0
Forfar Athletic	Total		66	0	2	0	1	0	—		1	0	70	0
Motherwell	1994–95	Scottish Premier Division	0	0	—		1	0	1 (Note: Appearance in UEFA Cup)	0	—		2	0
Career total			67	0	2	0	2	0	1	0	1	0	73	0

== Honours ==
Brechin City

- Scottish League Second Division second-place promotion: 1992–93
- Scottish League Third Division second-place promotion: 1995–96

Glenrothes

- Fife Regional League (3): 1970–71, 1975–76, 1977–78
- Fife Regional League East Division (1): 1978–79
- Fife & Lothians Cup (1): 1971–72
- Fife Junior Cup (4): 1971–72, 1975–76, 1976–77, 1978–79
- Cowdenbeath Cup (3): 1971–72, 1976–77, 1977–78
- East Fife Cup (1): 1971–72
- Caledonian Cup (1): 1975–76
- Fife Drybrough Cup (1): 1978–79
- Montrave Cup (1): 1971–72

Individual

- Cowdenbeath Hall of Fame
