= John Casey (footballer) =

Scottish footballer

Personal information
- Full name: John Casey

Senior career*
Years	Team	Apps	(Gls)
1935–1939	Dumbarton	101	(1)
1939–1941	Dumbarton (wartime)	18	(1)
- * Club domestic league appearances and goals

John Casey was a Scottish football player, who played for Dumbarton during the 1930s.
