= 1935–36 Scottish Division Two =

Scottish Second Division
- Season: 1935–36
- Champions: Falkirk
- Promoted: Falkirk; St Mirren

The 1935–36 Scottish Second Division was won by Falkirk who, along with second placed St Mirren, were promoted to the First Division. Dumbarton finished bottom.

== Table ==
Pos	Team	Pld	W	D	L	GF	GA	GD	Pts	Promotion or relegation
1	Falkirk	34	28	3	3	132	34	+98	59	Promotion to the 1936–37 First Division
2	St Mirren	34	25	2	7	114	41	+73	52	Promotion to the 1936–37 First Division
3	Morton	34	21	6	7	117	60	+57	48	
4	Alloa Athletic	34	19	6	9	65	51	+14	44	
5	St Bernard's	34	18	4	12	106	78	+28	40	
6	East Fife	34	16	6	12	86	79	+7	38	
7	Dundee United	34	16	5	13	108	81	+27	37	
8	East Stirlingshire	34	13	8	13	70	75	−5	34	
9	Leith Athletic	34	15	3	16	67	77	−10	33	
10	Cowdenbeath	34	13	5	16	76	77	−1	31	
11	Stenhousemuir	34	13	3	18	59	78	−19	29	
12	Montrose	34	13	3	18	58	82	−24	29	
13	Forfar Athletic	34	10	7	17	60	81	−21	27	
14	King's Park	34	11	5	18	55	109	−54	27	
15	Edinburgh City	34	8	9	17	57	83	−26	25	
16	Brechin City	34	8	6	20	57	96	−39	22	
17	Raith Rovers	34	9	3	22	60	96	−36	21	
18	Dumbarton	34	5	6	23	52	121	−69	16	

Source: "1935-1936 Division 2 - SPFL Archive". SPFL.
