= Thomas McGunnigle =

Scottish footballer

Personal information
- Full name: Thomas McGunnigle
- Date of birth: 31 March 1905
- Place of birth: Glasgow, Scotland
- Position: Outside right

Youth career
- Maryhill Hibs

Senior career*
Years	Team	Apps	(Gls)
1931–1932	Celtic		
1932–1933	Glentoran		
1933–1934	Dumbarton	26	(4)
1934–1935	Cork		
1936–1939	Brechin City		
- * Club domestic league appearances and goals

Thomas McGunnigle (born 31 March 1905) was a Scottish footballer who played for Celtic, Glentoran, Dumbarton, Cork and Brechin City.
