= Harry Cook (footballer) =

Scottish footballer

Personal information
- Full name: Henry Learmonth Cook
- Date of birth: 29 March 1914
- Place of birth: Renfrew, Scotland
- Date of death: January 1987 (aged 71)
- Place of death: Surrey, England
- Position: Inside left

Youth career
- Renfrew

Senior career*
Years	Team	Apps	(Gls)
1934–1935	Kilmarnock	1	(0)
1935–1936	Dumbarton	21	(8)
- * Club domestic league appearances and goals

Henry Learmonth Cook (29 March 1914 – January 1987) was a Scottish footballer who played for Kilmarnock and Dumbarton.
