= Andrew Heeps =

Scottish footballer

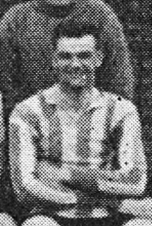
- Heeps while with Brentford in 1928.

Personal information
- Full name: Andrew Heeps
- Date of birth: 15 December 1899
- Place of birth: Stirling, Scotland
- Date of death: 1981 (aged 81–82)
- Place of death: New Zealand
- Position: Centre half

Youth career
- Banknock Juniors

Senior career*
| Years | Team | Apps | (Gls) |
| –1924 | Dunfermline Athletic | | |
| 1924–1928 | Airdrieonians | 16 | (0) |
| 1928–1929 | Brentford | 2 | (0) |
- Camelon Juniors
- Bo'ness
| 1932–1933 | Dumbarton | 15 | (5) |
- * Club domestic league appearances and goals

Andrew Heeps (15 December 1899 – 1981) was a Scottish professional footballer who played in the Scottish League for Dumbarton and Airdrieonians as a centre half. He also played in the Football League for Brentford.

== Career statistics ==
Appearances and goals by club, season and competition
| Club | Season | League | | | National cup (Note: Includes Scottish Cup, FA Cup) | | Total | |
| Club | Season | Division | Apps | Goals | Apps | Goals | Apps | Goals |
|---|---|---|---|---|---|---|---|---|
| Airdrieonians | 1924–25 | Scottish First Division | 1 | 0 | 0 | 0 | 1 | 0 |
| Airdrieonians | 1925–26 | Scottish First Division | 3 | 0 | 0 | 0 | 3 | 0 |
| Airdrieonians | 1926–27 | Scottish First Division | 5 | 0 | 0 | 0 | 5 | 0 |
| Airdrieonians | 1927–28 | Scottish First Division | 7 | 0 | 0 | 0 | 7 | 0 |
| Airdrieonians | Total | | 16 | 0 | 0 | 0 | 16 | 0 |
| Brentford | 1928–29 | Third Division South | 2 | 0 | 0 | 0 | 2 | 0 |
| Dumbarton | 1932–33 | Scottish Second Division | 15 | 5 | 0 | 0 | 15 | 5 |
| Career total | | | 33 | 5 | 0 | 0 | 33 | 5 |
