= 1934–35 Scottish Division Two =

Scottish Second Division
- Season: 1934–35
- Champions: Third Lanark
- Promoted: Third Lanark; Arbroath

The 1934–35 Scottish Second Division was won by Third Lanark who, along with second placed Arbroath, were promoted to the First Division. Edinburgh City finished bottom.

== Table ==
Pos	Team	Pld	W	D	L	GF	GA	GD	Pts	Promotion or relegation
1	Third Lanark	34	23	6	5	94	43	+51	52	Promotion to the 1935–36 First Division
2	Arbroath	34	23	4	7	78	42	+36	50	Promotion to the 1935–36 First Division
3	St Bernard's	34	20	7	7	103	47	+56	47	
4	Dundee United	34	18	6	10	105	65	+40	42	
5	Stenhousemuir	34	17	5	12	86	80	+6	39	
6	Morton	34	17	4	13	88	64	+24	38	
7	King's Park	34	18	2	14	86	71	+15	38	
8	Leith Athletic	34	16	5	13	69	71	−2	37	
9	East Fife	34	16	3	15	79	73	+6	35	
10	Alloa Athletic	34	12	10	12	67	60	+7	34	
11	Forfar Athletic	34	13	8	13	77	73	+4	34	
12	Cowdenbeath	34	13	6	15	84	75	+9	32	
13	Raith Rovers	34	13	3	18	68	73	−5	29	
14	East Stirlingshire	34	11	7	16	57	76	−19	29	
15	Brechin City	34	10	6	18	51	98	−47	26	
16	Dumbarton	34	9	4	21	60	105	−45	22	
17	Montrose	34	7	6	21	58	105	−47	20	
18	Edinburgh City	34	3	2	29	44	133	−89	8	

Source: "1934-1935 Division 2 - SPFL Archive". SPFL (in Malay).
