= 1929–30 Scottish Division Two =

Scottish Second Division
- Season: 1929–30
- Champions: Leith Athletic
- Promoted: Leith Athletic; East Fife

The 1929–30 Scottish Second Division was won by Leith Athletic who, along with second placed East Fife, were promoted to the First Division. Brechin City finished bottom.

== Table ==
| Pos | Team | Pld | W | D | L | GF | GA | GD | Pts | Promotion or relegation |
|---|---|---|---|---|---|---|---|---|---|---|
| 1 | Leith Athletic | 38 | 23 | 11 | 4 | 92 | 42 | +50 | 57 | Promotion to the 1930–31 First Division |
| 2 | East Fife | 38 | 26 | 5 | 7 | 114 | 58 | +56 | 57 | Promotion to the 1930–31 First Division |
| 3 | Albion Rovers | 38 | 24 | 6 | 8 | 101 | 60 | +41 | 54 | |
| 4 | Third Lanark | 38 | 23 | 6 | 9 | 92 | 53 | +39 | 52 | |
| 5 | Raith Rovers | 38 | 18 | 8 | 12 | 94 | 67 | +27 | 44 | |
| 6 | King's Park | 38 | 17 | 8 | 13 | 109 | 80 | +29 | 42 | |
| 7 | Queen of the South | 38 | 18 | 6 | 14 | 65 | 63 | +2 | 42 | |
| 8 | Forfar Athletic | 38 | 18 | 5 | 15 | 98 | 95 | +3 | 41 | |
| 9 | Arbroath | 38 | 16 | 7 | 15 | 83 | 87 | −4 | 39 | |
| 10 | Dunfermline Athletic | 38 | 16 | 6 | 16 | 99 | 85 | +14 | 38 | |
| 11 | Montrose | 38 | 14 | 10 | 14 | 79 | 87 | −8 | 38 | |
| 12 | East Stirlingshire | 38 | 16 | 4 | 18 | 83 | 75 | +8 | 36 | |
| 13 | Bo'ness | 38 | 15 | 4 | 19 | 67 | 95 | −28 | 34 | |
| 14 | St Bernard's | 38 | 13 | 6 | 19 | 65 | 65 | 0 | 32 | |
| 15 | Armadale | 38 | 13 | 5 | 20 | 56 | 91 | −35 | 31 | |
| 16 | Dumbarton | 38 | 14 | 2 | 22 | 77 | 95 | −18 | 30 | |
| 17 | Stenhousemuir | 38 | 11 | 5 | 22 | 75 | 108 | −33 | 27 | |
| 18 | Clydebank | 38 | 7 | 10 | 21 | 66 | 92 | −26 | 24 | |
| 19 | Alloa Athletic | 38 | 9 | 6 | 23 | 55 | 104 | −49 | 24 | |
| 20 | Brechin City | 38 | 7 | 4 | 27 | 57 | 125 | −68 | 18 | |
