= George Greig =

Scottish businessman, politician, footballer, and football manager

Personal information
- Date of birth: 13 April 1871
- Place of birth: Dundee, Scotland
- Date of death: 22 November 1940 (aged 69)
- Place of death: Perth, Scotland

Senior career*
Years	Team	Apps	(Gls)
- Lochee Athletic
1894–1898	Old St Stephen's		

Managerial career
- 1936–1938: Dundee United
- * Club domestic league appearances and goals

George Greig (13 April 1871 – 22 November 1940) was a Scottish businessman, politician and football player and manager. He was manager of Dundee United from 1936 to 1938.

== Early life ==
Greig was born in Dundee on 13 April 1871. He served an apprenticeship as a painter before going to work in London.

== Football career ==
Greig was a first team player for local club Lochee Athletic at the age of 14. After moving to London, he played professionally for Old St Stephen's in the Southern League from 1894 to 1898.

In March 1936 he saved Dundee United from almost inevitable bankruptcy. Seven months later he sacked veteran manager Jimmy Brownlie and took over himself as director-manager. This arrangement lasted a year and a half before Greig resigned in March 1938.

== Business career ==
Greig ran a wholesale tobacconists business in Dundee for around twenty years. His other business interests included a cinema in the Broughty Ferry area of Dundee and a restaurant in St Andrews.

== Political career ==
Greig was a prominent baillie on Dundee Corporation for many years. He resigned from Dundee Town Council for health reasons in August 1940, and died three months later.
