= Archibald Milliken =

Scottish footballer

Personal information
- Full name: Archibald Twaddle Milliken
- Date of birth: 24 November 1909
- Place of birth: Dennistoun, Glasgow, Scotland
- Date of death: 1981 (aged 71)
- Place of death: Rutherglen, Glasgow, Scotland
- Position: Goalkeeper

Youth career
- Rutherglen Glencairn

Senior career*
Years	Team	Apps	(Gls)
1932–1933	Kilmarnock		
1933–1934	Dundee United		
1933–1935	Dumbarton	2	(0)
- * Club domestic league appearances and goals

Archibald Twaddle Milliken (24 November 1909 – 1981) was a Scottish footballer who played for Kilmarnock, Dundee United and Dumbarton.

He was born in Dennistoun, Glasgow, the son of insurance agent Arthur Milliken and Elizabeth Twaddle Milliken.
