= David Beattie (footballer) =

Scottish footballer

Personal information
- Full name: David Beattie
- Date of birth: 23 August 1903
- Place of birth: Renton
- Position: Right half

Youth career
- New Brighton

Senior career*
Years	Team	Apps	(Gls)
1926–1928	Clydebank		
1929–1930	Dumbarton	2	(0)
- * Club domestic league appearances and goals

David Beattie (born 23 August 1903) was a Scottish footballer who played for Clydebank and Dumbarton.
