= 1930–31 Scottish Division One =

32nd season of top-tier football league in Scotland

Scottish Division One
- Season: 1930–31
- Champions: Rangers
- Relegated: Hibernian; East Fife

The 1930–31 Scottish Division One season was won by Rangers by two points over nearest rival Celtic. Hibernian and East Fife finished 19th and 20th respectively and were relegated to the 1931–32 Scottish Division Two.

== League table ==
Pos	Team	Pld	W	D	L	GF	GA	GD	Pts
1	Rangers	38	27	6	5	96	29	+67	60
2	Celtic	38	24	10	4	101	34	+67	58
3	Motherwell	38	24	8	6	102	42	+60	56
4	Partick Thistle	38	24	5	9	76	43	+33	53
5	Heart of Midlothian	38	19	6	13	90	63	+27	44
6	Aberdeen	38	17	7	14	79	63	+16	41
7	Cowdenbeath	38	17	7	14	58	65	−7	41
8	Dundee	38	17	5	16	65	63	+2	39
9	Airdrieonians	38	17	5	16	59	66	−7	39
10	Hamilton Academical	38	16	5	17	59	57	+2	37
11	Kilmarnock	38	15	5	18	59	60	−1	35
12	Clyde	38	15	4	19	60	87	−27	34
13	Queen's Park	38	13	7	18	71	72	−1	33
14	Falkirk	38	14	4	20	77	87	−10	32
15	St Mirren	38	11	8	19	49	72	−23	30
16	Morton	38	11	7	20	58	83	−25	29
17	Leith Athletic	38	8	11	19	51	85	−34	27
18	Ayr United	38	8	11	19	53	92	−39	27
19	Hibernian	38	9	7	22	49	81	−32	25
20	East Fife	38	8	4	26	45	113	−68	20

Source: "1930-1931 Division 1 - SPFL Archive". SPFL.

== Results ==
Home \ Away	ABE	AIR	AYR	CEL	CLY	COW	DND	EFI	FAL	HAM	HOM	HIB	KIL	LEI	MOR	MOT	PAR	QPA	RAN	STM
Aberdeen		2–0	3–1	1–1	8–1	1–1	6–1	4–1	2–1	0–2	2–1	7–0	2–0	2–1	4–0	2–4	3–1	3–1	1–3	0–0
Airdrieonians	2–0		2–1	1–2	2–1	2–1	2–0	0–3	1–3	3–1	2–2	4–1	4–3	4–1	2–0	0–5	0–2	1–3	3–3	3–0
Ayr United	2–1	0–0		2–6	0–2	5–1	2–6	3–1	2–5	4–2	1–1	1–3	1–0	2–0	2–2	2–3	1–1	3–1	2–2	2–0
Celtic	1–0	3–1	4–1		0–1	6–0	2–2	9–1	3–0	2–1	2–1	6–0	3–1	4–0	4–1	4–1	5–1	1–1	2–0	3–1
Clyde	2–5	2–1	1–1	0–2		5–2	2–2	3–0	0–1	3–1	1–2	3–2	0–3	2–2	1–0	0–6	1–2	2–4	0–8	3–0
Cowdenbeath	2–0	2–1	1–1	1–1	0–1		3–0	2–1	3–0	3–1	2–2	2–1	3–1	7–1	3–0	1–0	0–3	1–3	1–3	3–1
Dundee	4–2	0–1	5–2	0–0	2–1	2–0		2–0	3–1	4–2	1–3	1–0	0–2	6–0	3–0	2–1	0–0	3–0	0–1	2–0
East Fife	1–3	1–5	4–1	2–6	1–4	0–0	1–2		4–4	2–0	1–0	1–0	4–1	0–0	2–3	1–1	0–2	3–2	0–4	3–2
Falkirk	5–3	1–3	2–0	3–2	4–0	4–0	4–1	1–0		1–4	0–3	2–2	4–2	2–3	3–1	0–1	2–4	3–0	1–3	1–3
Hamilton Academical	3–0	1–1	3–1	0–0	4–0	0–1	1–0	4–1	5–1		3–2	1–0	0–0	2–3	1–1	1–0	2–0	3–1	0–3	1–0
Heart of Midlothian	3–2	6–3	9–0	1–1	0–3	1–1	2–0	6–1	4–2	0–4		4–1	1–4	5–2	2–4	5–1	1–2	2–1	3–0	3–1
Hibernian	1–2	2–0	2–0	0–0	1–2	1–0	2–3	2–1	5–2	1–0	2–2		3–2	0–1	1–1	2–2	0–3	4–2	1–2	2–3
Kilmarnock	1–1	1–0	2–1	0–3	2–1	0–1	1–2	5–1	1–1	3–1	0–1	4–0		2–1	3–0	1–4	2–0	2–1	1–0	2–3
Leith Athletic	0–0	0–1	1–1	0–3	2–4	2–2	3–1	6–1	2–2	1–2	2–1	1–1	0–1		2–3	2–5	2–1	2–0	1–3	1–1
Morton	1–2	5–0	1–1	0–1	0–1	1–2	2–1	3–0	5–3	1–0	2–4	5–4	2–2	1–1		0–3	3–1	1–3	1–2	4–2
Motherwell	5–0	4–0	1–1	3–3	4–4	3–1	2–0	4–1	6–1	3–0	2–0	6–0	1–1	4–1	3–0		0–0	2–1	1–0	3–1
Partick Thistle	2–1	2–0	5–1	1–0	2–0	4–1	4–1	8–0	3–2	1–1	2–1	1–0	3–1	2–0	2–1	0–3		5–1	1–1	2–1
Queen's Park	2–2	0–0	4–1	3–3	4–1	0–3	2–2	5–1	2–0	5–0	1–2	2–2	2–0	1–1	5–2	1–3	2–1		0–2	4–1
Rangers	4–0	0–1	5–1	1–0	5–1	7–0	3–0	4–0	1–0	1–0	4–1	1–0	1–0	4–1	7–1	1–1	3–1	2–0		1–1
St Mirren	2–2	2–3	0–0	1–3	2–1	0–1	3–1	2–0	0–5	4–2	0–3	1–0	4–2	2–2	0–0	2–1	0–1	2–1	1–1	

Legend: Blue = home team win; Yellow = draw; Red = away team win.
