= James Liddell =

Scottish footballer

Personal information
- Full name: James Liddell
- Date of birth: 1897
- Place of birth: Baillieston, Scotland
- Position: Wing half

Senior career*
Years	Team	Apps	(Gls)
–	Ashfield		
1920–1921	Liverpool	0	(0)
1921	→ Albion Rovers (loan)		
1921–1924	Bristol Rovers	30	(4)
1924	Preston North End	0	(0)
1924–1925	Albion Rovers	29	(8)
1925–1930	Clyde	111	(5)
1930–1931	Albion Rovers	14	(1)
1931–1933	Dumbarton	50	(3)
1933–1939	Albion Rovers	104	(5)
- * Club domestic league appearances and goals

James Liddell (born 1897) was a Scottish footballer who played for Albion Rovers, Dumbarton and Clyde.

He joined Liverpool in 1920 but failed to make any first team appearances in his year at Anfield, moving on to Bristol Rovers in 1921. In two and a half years in Bristol he made thirty league appearances, scoring either 4 or 5 goals. In January 1924 he moved to First Division side Preston North End, but as with his time in Liverpool, he didn't make any first team appearances for them.
