= Archibald Turner (footballer) =

Scottish footballer

Personal information
- Full name: Archibald Turner
- Date of birth: 1910
- Place of birth: Hillhead, Scotland
- Date of death: 1990 (aged 79–80)
- Position: Outside right

Senior career*
Years	Team	Apps	(Gls)
1929–1932	Partick Thistle		
1932–1933	Dumbarton	10	(0)
1932–1933	Kilmarnock		
1935–1936	Dumbarton	1	(0)
- * Club domestic league appearances and goals

Archibald Turner (1910–1990) was a Scottish footballer who played for Partick Thistle, Dumbarton and Kilmarnock.
