= 1931–32 Scottish Division Two =

Scottish Second Division
- Season: 1931–32
- Champions: East Stirlingshire
- Promoted: East Stirlingshire; St Johnstone

The 1931–32 Scottish Second Division was won by East Stirlingshire who, along with second placed St Johnstone, were promoted to the First Division. Edinburgh City finished bottom.

== Table ==
Pos	Team	Pld	W	D	L	GF	GA	GR	Pts	Promotion or relegation
1	East Stirlingshire (C, P)	38	26	3	9	111	55	2.018	55	Promotion to 1932–33 Scottish First Division
2	St Johnstone (P)	38	24	7	7	102	52	1.962	55	Promotion to 1932–33 Scottish First Division
3	Raith Rovers	38	20	6	12	83	65	1.277	46	
4	Stenhousemuir	38	19	8	11	88	76	1.158	46	
5	St Bernard's	38	19	7	12	81	62	1.306	45	
6	Forfar Athletic	38	19	7	12	90	79	1.139	45	
7	Hibernian	38	18	8	12	73	52	1.404	44	
8	East Fife	38	18	5	15	107	77	1.390	41	
9	Queen of the South	38	18	5	15	99	91	1.088	41	
10	Dunfermline Athletic	38	17	6	15	78	73	1.068	40	
11	Arbroath	38	17	5	16	82	78	1.051	39	
12	Dumbarton	38	14	10	14	70	60	1.167	38	
13	Alloa Athletic	38	14	7	17	73	74	0.986	35	
14	Bo'ness	38	15	4	19	70	103	0.680	34	
15	King's Park	38	14	5	19	97	93	1.043	33	
16	Albion Rovers	38	13	2	23	81	104	0.779	28	
17	Montrose	38	11	6	21	60	96	0.625	28	
18	Armadale	38	10	5	23	68	102	0.667	25	
19	Brechin City	38	9	7	22	52	97	0.536	25	
20	Edinburgh City	38	5	7	26	78	146	0.534	17	

Source: statto.com
Rules for classification: 1) points; 2) goal ratio.
(C) Champions; (P) Promoted
