= David Collins (Scottish footballer) =

Scottish footballer

Personal information
- Full name: David Collins
- Date of birth: 1912
- Place of birth: Dumbarton
- Position: Winger

Youth career
- Dumbarton Fern

Senior career*
Years	Team	Apps	(Gls)
1931–1934	Dumbarton	47	(9)
1934–1939	Morton		
1939–1940	Dumbarton (wartime guest)	22	(3)
1940–1942	Morton		
- * Club domestic league appearances and goals

David Collins (born 1912, date of death unknown) was a Scottish footballer who played for Dumbarton and Morton.
