= City Park, Edinburgh =

Football ground in Edinburgh, Scotland

City Park
- Location within the City of Edinburgh council area
- Location: Edinburgh, Scotland
- Coordinates: 55.9703°N 3.2279°W
- Owner: City of Edinburgh Council
- Surface: Grass
- Record attendance: 5,740

Construction
- Closed: 2009

Tenants
- Edinburgh City (1935–1955); Ferranti Thistle (1969–1974); Hibernian reserves (1970–?); Spartans (1976–2009); Craigroyston (?–1998)

City Park was a football ground in Edinburgh, Scotland. The ground was used by several clubs, including Edinburgh City, Ferranti Thistle, Hibernian reserves, Spartans and Craigroyston.

== History ==
Edinburgh City moved to City Park in 1935 from their Marine Gardens ground. The ground was initially an open field, but embankments were built around the pitch, with a grandstand erected on the eastern side. Edinburgh played their first league match at the ground on 12 August 1935, a 3–1 defeat by Falkirk in front of 1,000 spectators. The record attendance of 5,740 was set for a Scottish Cup first round match against Cowdenbeath later in the season on 25 January 1936, with the away team winning 3–2.

The Scottish Football League (SFL) was suspended due to World War II in 1939, and at the end of the war City did not return to the league. The final SFL match at the ground was played on 26 August 1939, a 3–0 win over Morton. After City folded in 1955 due to Edinburgh Corporation refusing to extend their lease, the ground was used by several other clubs. Ferranti Thistle moved to City Park in 1969 after Edinburgh Corporation announced that a new college would be built on their Crewe Toll ground. Ferranti built a new changing room block, and were joined at City Park by Hibernian reserves the following year. However, Ferranti left in 1974 to move to the Meadowbank Stadium after being elected to the SFL, as the ground was no longer deemed fit for the league.

In 1976 Spartans moved to City Park. Their record attendance at the ground was 3,346, set for a Scottish Cup fourth round match against St Mirren on 5 February 2006. Three years later the club left to move to nearby Ainslie Park. Their final match at the ground was played on 16 May 2009, an East of Scotland Football League match against the reformed Edinburgh City. During Spartans' tenure, the ground was also shared with Craigroyston until 1998, before they moved to St Mark's Park.

After Spartans left the ground, the site was used for housing despite opposition from local residents who had formed a "Save City Park" group.
