= Charles Ballantyne (footballer) =

Scottish footballer

Personal information
- Date of birth: 30 August 1914
- Place of birth: Dumbarton, Scotland
- Date of death: 21 August 1991 (aged 76)
- Position: Centre half

Youth career
- Kilpatrick Juniors

Senior career*
Years	Team	Apps	(Gls)
1931–1935	Dumbarton	112	(13)
1935–1937	Clyde	8	(0)
- * Club domestic league appearances and goals

Charles Graham Ballantyne (30 August 1914 – 21 August 1991) was a Scottish footballer who played for Dumbarton and Clyde.
