= William Parlane =

Scottish footballer

Willie Parlane
Personal information
- Full name: William Parlane
- Date of birth: 27 November 1908
- Place of birth: Rhu, Scotland
- Date of death: 1988 (aged 79–80)
- Place of death: Helensburgh, Scotland
- Position: Forward

Senior career*
Years	Team	Apps	(Gls)
1929–1933	Dumbarton	118	(62)
1933–1934	St Mirren	4	(0)
1933–1935	Queen's Park	3	(0)
1935–1937	Dumbarton	19	(4)

International career
1931–1932	Scotland Amateur	2	(0)
- * Club domestic league appearances and goals

William Parlane (27 November 1908 – 1988) was a Scottish footballer who played for Dumbarton, St Mirren and Queen's Park during the 1930s. During his first spell with Dumbarton, he earned two caps for the Scotland amateur team.

His brothers John (his twin) and Alex also played for both Dumbarton and Scotland Amateurs. Another brother Jimmy was also a footballer, and the father of former Rangers and Scotland player Derek Parlane.
