= Marine Gardens =

Former stadium in Edinburgh, Scotland

- Location within the City of Edinburgh council area
- Location: Firth of Forth Portobello, Edinburgh
- Coordinates: 55°57′31.8″N 3°7′20.3″W
- Opened: 1909
- Closed: 1939

Tenants
- Leith Athletic F.C. Edinburgh City F.C.: 1928–1936; 1928–1931, 1934–1935

The Marine Gardens was an entertainment complex located in the Portobello area of Edinburgh, Scotland. Opened in 1909 as a pleasure garden and amusement park on the shores of the Firth of Forth, most of its original attractions apart from the ballroom were removed following military use of the site during the First World War. The complex also included a stadium which was used during the interwar period for football, greyhound racing and speedway. It was the home venue of Scottish Football League teams Leith Athletic (1928–1936) and Edinburgh City (1928–31 and 1934–35). The Marine Gardens closed down permanently in 1939 after again being taken over by the military, with the area being redeveloped after the Second World War.

== Origins ==
Part of the vast Craigentinny Meadows located on the shore of the Firth of Forth was the area chosen to construct Marine Gardens. The meadows had for years previously been used as an outlet for Edinburgh's sewerage where the land was rotated and irrigated to produce meadow grass that could be used for cattle grazing. This easterly part of the meadows in Portobello would be a permanent host for the new Marine Gardens which acquired and relocated the buildings and exhibition from the successful 1908 Scottish National Exhibition held in Saughton Park in Edinburgh.

== Opening ==
Opened in 1909, its attractions initially included a ballroom, circus and zoo, cinema and theatre, scenic railway, ornamental gardens and maze and a football ground.

== Closure and new stadium ==
The Marine Gardens was closed down and taken over for military use during the First World War. The troops did not leave until 1919 and the Marine Gardens Company was wound up in 1921 resulting in the removal of the attractions with the exception of the ballroom. A twelve-acre section of the Gardens and the ballroom were purchased by Fred G Yooll in 1921. Yooll promoted events at the ballroom and in 1927 applied for permission to erect a sports pavilion and football pitch which was granted. From May 1928 the stadium staged speedway and was used by the football clubs Leith Athletic (1928 to 1936) and Edinburgh City (1928 to 1931 and 1934 to 1935). Boxing bouts took place in the ballroom (including Primo Carnera) in addition to baseball matches and midget cars.

== Greyhound racing ==
In 1931 a greyhound syndicate made enquiries to start greyhound racing at Marine Gardens which then attracted the Greyhound Racing Association (GRA). The GRA owned nearby Powderhall Stadium and secured a lease on New Year's Day 1931 and gained planning permission to build a new grandstand in May 1932. The track opened to greyhounds on the Saturday afternoon of 2 July 1932.

Teething troubles caused the first meeting to be abandoned due to hare mechanical failure, the first race witnessed by 6,000 spectators was voided and after only one completed 525 yards race it broke down again. A second meeting finally took place on 16 July with the first evening meeting on 21 July. Racing is believed to have continued until late 1936.

== Speedway ==
Speedway started on 19 May 1928, with an open meeting organised by the Scottish Dirt Track Motor Racing Club. It ended during 1931 following the GRA signing of the lease. Fred Yooll died in January 1936 and the well-known speedway promoter Jimmy Fraser took over with speedway returning in 1938.

== Permanent closure ==
The area was again required for military purposes during the Second World War, leading to the final closure of the complex. After the war most of the Marine Gardens was demolished becoming industrial factories, the speedway track became a test track for a car company. Since 1962, the location of the Marine Gardens has been occupied by a bus depot.
