= Edinburgh City F.C. (1928) =

Former association football club in Scotland

Edinburgh City
- Full name: Edinburgh City Football Club
- Nickname(s): The Lilywhites, The Citizens
- Founded: 1928
- Dissolved: 1955
Home colours

Edinburgh City Football Club was an amateur Scottish football club which played in the Scottish Football League in the 1930s and 1940s, but went out of business in the 1950s. A new club adopted the Edinburgh City name in 1986.

== History ==
Edinburgh City were founded in 1928 and joined the Scottish Football League as an amateur club in 1931. The club won election to the league, where they replaced Clydebank, ahead of Nithsdale Wanderers by 25 votes to 7.

The club was very unsuccessful in the league, as on average they won fewer than one game in six. This record led to the club finishing bottom of the league table in six of the eight seasons between 1931 and 1939. It also conceded more than 110 goals in seven of those seasons. They achieved a famous Scottish Cup upset victory when they defeated Hibernian 3–2 at Easter Road in the first round of the 1937–38 competition. Hibernian's Arthur Milne missed a penalty kick with five minutes left to play. In the next round, Edinburgh City lost 9–2 at Raith Rovers on 9 February 1938.

The club played in the Lothian Amateur League during the Second World War and were only admitted to the C Division in 1946. After three more years of struggle, the club left the Scottish Football League in 1949. It switched to junior status and played in the Edinburgh & District Junior League. The club stopped playing football in 1955. The city council had not renewed the lease on its home ground, City Park.

A new club called Postal United was founded in 1966. The Edinburgh City Football Club Ltd., which had continued trading as a social club since the football club stopped playing, approved an application from Postal United in 1986 to adopt the Edinburgh City name. The new Edinburgh City gained promotion to the Scottish Professional Football League in 2016.

== Stadium ==
When the club was formed in 1928, they played at the Marine Gardens. When they first joined the Scottish Football League in 1931, it played its home matches at Powderhall Stadium. The pitch was only just wider than the minimum width of 50 yards due to the presence of a sprint track. Edinburgh City also played at City Park during the club's time in the SFL.

== Colours ==
The club colours were white and black.
