= 1960–61 Dumbarton F.C. season =

Dumbarton
1960–1961 season
- Manager: Bobby Combe
- Stadium: Boghead Park, Dumbarton
- Scottish League Division 2: 10th
- Scottish Cup: Second round
- Scottish League Cup: Quarter-finals
- Top goalscorer: League: David Fagan/ Hugh Gallacher (9); All: Tom Whalen (12)
Home colours

The 1960–61 season was the 77th football season in which Dumbarton competed at a Scottish national level, entering the Scottish Football League, the Scottish Cup and the Scottish League Cup. In addition Dumbarton competed in the Stirlingshire Cup.

== Scottish Second Division ==
Another good start to the season - unbeaten in the first four games - was not maintained and Dumbarton never really managed to progress above mid-table, finishing in 10th place with 35 points, 20 behind champions Stirling Albion.

24 August 1960 Division 2	Dumbarton	5–1	Hamilton	Boghead Park
	Duchart 44', 48'; Bryce; Ormond 75'; Whalen 89'		Divers 19'	Attendance: 4,000; Referee: T Wharton

10 September 1960 Division 2	Queens Park	1–1	Dumbarton	Hampden Park
	Church 84'		Ormond 9'	Attendance: 2,500; Referee: J Barclay

17 September 1960 Division 2	Dumbarton	1–0	East Fife	Boghead Park
	Duchart 86'			Attendance: 3,000; Referee: D Minto

24 September 1960 Division 2	Stenhousemuir	4–4	Dumbarton	Ochilview Park
	Wright 23', 25', 81'; Lawson 60'		Fagan 4', 14', 16'; MacKenzie 58'	Attendance: 2,000; Referee: R Davidson

28 September 1960 Division 2	Dumbarton	0–2	Cowdenbeath	Boghead Park
			McLeod 20', 55'	Referee: J Stewart

1 October 1960 Division 2	Dumbarton	7–2	Forfar Athletic	Boghead Park
	Duchart 32' (pen.), 36' (pen.), 62'; Fagan 55', 66', 69'; Whalen 67'		McClure 15' (pen.) 81' (pen.)	Attendance: 2,500; Referee: D Weir

12 October 1960 Division 2	Dumbarton	2–4	Morton	Boghead Park
	Tulloch 55'; Duchart 76' (pen.)		Murray 19'; Collings 23', 89'; Boyd 40' (pen.)	Referee: EF Cowan

15 October 1960 Division 2	Queen of the South	0–2	Dumbarton	Palmerston Park
			Tulloch 8'; Duchart 56' (pen.)	Attendance: 4,500; Referee: F Crossley

22 October 1960 Division 2	Dumbarton	1–2	Falkirk	Boghead Park
	Ormond 48'		Morran 43'; Reid 47'	Attendance: 3,400; Referee: A Mullin

29 October 1960 Division 2	Berwick Rangers	2–2	Dumbarton	Shielfield Park
	Imrie 27'; Slavin 83'		Tulloch 3', 69'	Attendance: 1,330; Referee: J Holborn

5 November 1960 Division 2	Dumbarton	2–4	Montrose	Boghead Park
	Whalen 15'; Tulloch 60'		Birse 25', 54'; Sandeman 52', 83'	Attendance: 2,000; Referee: G Mitchell

12 November 1960 Division 2	Stirling Albion	0–0	Dumbarton	Annfield Stadium
				Attendance: 3,000; Referee: W Ritchie

19 November 1960 Division 2	Dumbarton	3–3	East Stirling	Boghead Park
	MacKenzie 32'; Whalen 38'; Tulloch 85'		Dickie 28'; Bolton 59'; Callaghan 63'	Attendance: 3,000; Referee: H Phillips

26 November 1960 Division 2	Albion Rovers	5–0	Dumbarton	Cliftonhill Stadium
	Kerr 20'; Kelly 52', 55'; Mulhall 65'; Stevenson 72'			Attendance: 800; Referee: T Wharton

3 December 1960 Division 2	Dumbarton	2–0	Brechin City	Boghead Park
	Whalen 39'; Bryce 87'			Attendance: 1,000; Referee: R Davidson

10 December 1960 Division 2	Alloa Athletic	1–2	Dumbarton	Recreation Park, Alloa
	Murphy 44'		Fagan 66', 84'	Attendance: 1,800; Referee: A Crossman

17 December 1960 Division 2	Dumbarton	1–2	Stranraer	Boghead Park
	Stewart 4'		Logan 11'; Beaton 28'	Attendance: 2,000; Referee: E Cowan

24 December 1960 Division 2	Arbroath	1–3	Dumbarton	Gayfield Park
	Lee 4'		Murney 26'; Stewart 28', 83'	Attendance: 1,600; Referee: J Barclay

31 December 1960 Division 2	Hamilton	1–0	Dumbarton	Douglas Park
	King 50'			Attendance: 2,000; Referee: J Stewart

2 January 1961 Division 2	Dumbarton	3–2	Queens Park	Boghead Park
	Bryce 33'; Stewart 40'; Fagan 87'		Cromar 5' (pen.); Buchanan 15'	Referee: W Elliot

7 January 1961 Division 2	East Fife	4–2	Dumbarton	Bayview Park, Methil
	Tran 23'; Stewart 25', 44'; Adam 52'		Kilgannon 60'; Bryce	Attendance: 2,000; Referee: J Gordon

14 January 1961 Division 2	Dumbarton	2–4	Stenhousemuir	Boghead Park
	Whalen 52'; Smith 54'		Shaw 17', 61'; Campbell 40'; Munn 47'	Referee: J Blair

21 January 1961 Division 2	Forfar Athletic	1–0	Dumbarton	Station Park, Forfar
	Coburn 58'			Attendance: 2,000; Referee: W Mullen

28 January 1961 Division 2	Morton	2–3	Dumbarton	Cappielow Park
	Craig 25'; Goldie 80'		Mackenzie 26'; Whalen 34', 66'	Attendance: 3,000; Referee: J Mackie

18 February 1961 Division 2	Dumbarton	3–1	Queen of the South	Boghead Park
	Murney 23'; Collings 68'; Ormond 89'		Elliott 38'	Attendance: 700; Referee: W Brittle

25 February 1961 Division 2	Falkirk	7–1	Dumbarton	Brockville Park
	Glidden 4' (o.g.); Reid 20', 75'; Moran 34', 45'; Lambie 77', 83' (pen.)		Ormond 39'	Attendance: 6,000; Referee: A Cook

4 March 1961 Division 2	Dumbarton	4–3	Berwick Rangers	Boghead Park
	Collings 15'; Ormond 52', 56'; Gallacher 57'		Hulme 35'; Imrie 58'; Kennedy 65'	Attendance: 1,500; Referee: R Rodgers

11 March 1961 Division 2	Montrose	4–1	Dumbarton	Links Park
	Riddell 28'; Kemp, R 35'; Sandeman 78'; Ross 82'		Gallacher 51'	Attendance: 1,300; Referee: W Fyfe

18 March 1961 Division 2	Dumbarton	2–4	Stirling Albion	Boghead Park
	Gallacher 36', 48'		Kilgannon 30', 35'; Gilmour 67'; Spence 83'	Attendance: 3,000; Referee: J Mackie

25 March 1961 Division 2	East Stirling	2–4	Dumbarton	Firs Park
	Ritchie 37'		MacKenzie 10'; Gallacher 12', 18', 62'	Attendance: 750; Referee: R Davidson

1 April 1961 Division 2	Dumbarton	2–0	Albion Rovers	Boghead Park
	MacKenzie 30'; Gallacher 43'			Attendance: 2,000; Referee: F Crossley

4 April 1961 Division 2	Cowdenbeath	3–2	Dumbarton	Central Park, Cowdenbeath
	Robertson (pen.); McBain		Stewart; Bain	Referee: A Crossman

8 April 1961 Division 2	Brechin City	3–2	Dumbarton	Glebe Park, Brechin
	Warrander 15'; Bowie 86'; Wyles 89' (pen.)		MacKenzie 42' (pen.); Stewart 85'	Attendance: 1,000; Referee: G Mitchell

10 April 1961 Division 2	Dumbarton	3–1	Alloa Athletic	Boghead Park
	Collings 14', 40'; MacKenzie 90' (pen.)		Davidson 85'	Referee: E Cowan

22 April 1961 Division 2	Stranraer	4–2	Dumbarton	Stair Park
	Gourlay 5', 40'; Stalker 53', 75'		Collings 25'; Murney 47'	Attendance: 1,300; Referee: W Syme

29 April 1961 Division 2	Dumbarton	4–2	Arbroath	Boghead Park
	Bain 2'; Murney 43'; Gallacher 68'; Collings 80'		McKenzie 60'; Gillespie 82'	Attendance: 800; Referee: H Phillips

== Scottish League Cup ==
With 3 wins and 3 draws from their 6 games, Dumbarton won their section in the League Cup, and following a play off win over Cowdenbeath, lost a close encounter with Queen of the South in the quarter-finals.

13 August 1960 Group 7	Berwick Rangers	2–2	Dumbarton	Shielfield Park
	Livingstone 9'; Beaton		Duchart 6'; Docherty 35' (o.g.)	Attendance: 2,606; Referee: W Fyfe

17 August 1960 Group 7	Dumbarton	0–0	Alloa Athletic	Boghead Park
				Attendance: 3,500; Referee: W Elliot

20 August 1960 Group 7	Morton	1–3	Dumbarton	Cappielow Park
	Collings 85'		Smith 7'; Bryce 23'; Duchart 40'	Attendance: 7,000; Referee: W Syme

27 August 1960 Group 7	Dumbarton	3–0	Berwick Rangers	Boghead Park
	Smith 19'; Bryce 64'; Whalen 74'			Attendance: 3,500; Referee: G Mitchell

31 August 1960 Group 7	Alloa Athletic	1–5	Dumbarton	Recreation Park, Alloa
	Davidson 21'		Smith 7'; Ormond 45', 58'; Whalen 50'; Black 51'	Referee: D Massey

3 September 1960 Group 7	Dumbarton	3–3	Morton	Boghead Park
	Bryce 5', 59'; Ormond 6'		Collings 9'; Fletcher 57'; Brown 73'	Attendance: 3,500; Referee: R Davidson

5 September 1960 Playoff First Leg	Dumbarton	3–0	Cowdenbeath	Boghead Park
	Whalen 4', 17'; Black 56'			Attendance: 5,500; Referee: W Brittle

7 September 1960 Playoff Second Leg	Cowdenbeath	2–1 (2–4 agg.)	Dumbarton	Central Park, Cowdenbeath
	Fraser 28'; Robertson 59'		Stirling 60' (o.g.)	Attendance: 4,000; Referee: W Brittle

14 September 1960 QF First Leg	Queen of the South	2–0	Dumbarton	Palmerston Park
	Elliott 25'; Broadis 44'			Attendance: 2,500; Referee: H Phillips

21 September 1960 QF Second Leg	Dumbarton	2–1 (3–4 agg.)	Queen of the South	Boghead Park
	Bryce 27'; Duchart 69'		Black 23'	Attendance: 6,000; Referee: H Phillips

== Scottish Cup ==
In the Scottish Cup, Dumbarton had another early exit, losing to Alloa Athletic in the second round, having received a first round bye.

11 February 1961 Cup round 2	Alloa Athletic	1–0	Dumbarton	Recreation Park, Alloa
	Docherty 67'			Attendance: 3,610; Referee: W Brittle

== Stirlingshire Cup ==
Locally Dumbarton again lost out to Falkirk in the semi-final of the Stirlingshire Cup, after a drawn game.

17 October 1960 First Round	Dumbarton	1–0	Stenhousemuir	Boghead Park
	Ormond 47'			Attendance: 1,000; Referee: W Syme

1 November 1960 Semi-final	Falkirk	1–1	Dumbarton	Brockville Park
	Moran 41'		Whalen 46'	Referee: T Wharton

9 January 1961 Semi-final Replay	Dumbarton	1–4	Falkirk	Boghead Park
	Nimmo 56'		Lambie 2', 54'; Bain 24'	Referee: T Wharton

== Friendlies ==
Finally, amongst the friendlies played during the season were home and away fixtures against English Northern Counties League opponents, Gateshead.

10 August 1960 Friendly	Dumbarton	5–0	Dennistoun Waverley	Boghead Park
	Bryce 23'

7 October 1960 Friendly	(England) Gateshead	3–0	Dumbarton	Redheugh Park
	Tickell 38', 64'; Murray 82'			Attendance: 1,400

26 October 1960 Friendly	Dumbarton	6–2	Vale of Leven	Boghead Park
	Goal		Goal

4 February 1961 Friendly	Dumbarton	4–1	(England) Gateshead	Boghead Park
	Nimmo 25'; Collings 40', 70'; Fagan 87'		Redhead 85' (pen.)

== Player statistics ==
=== Squad ===
No.	Pos	Nat	Player	Total		Second Division		Scottish Cup		League Cup	
No.	Pos	Nat	Player	Apps	Goals	Apps	Goals	Apps	Goals	Apps	Goals
	GK	(Scotland) SCO	Tommy Agnew	1	0	1	0	0	0	0	0
	GK	(Scotland) SCO	Willie Devlin	1	0	1	0	0	0	0	0
	GK	(Scotland) SCO	Donaldson	1	0	1	0	0	0	0	0
	GK	(Scotland) SCO	Bill Eadie	1	0	1	0	0	0	0	0
	GK	(Scotland) SCO	Eddie O'Donnell	2	0	1	0	0	0	1	0
	GK	(Scotland) SCO	Doug Robertson	40	0	31	0	0	0	9	0
	GK	(Scotland) SCO	Alan Ross	1	0	1	0	0	0	0	0
	DF	(Scotland) SCO	Tommy Govan	22	0	12	0	0	0	10	0
	DF	(Scotland) SCO	Charlie Hamill	41	0	31	0	1	0	9	0
	DF	(Scotland) SCO	Andy Jardine	24	0	22	0	0	0	2	0
	DF	(Scotland) SCO	Jim McGrogan	2	0	2	0	0	0	0	0
	MF	(Scotland) SCO	John Bain	5	2	5	2	0	0	0	0
	MF	(Scotland) SCO	Gordon Black	39	2	28	0	1	0	10	2
	MF	(Scotland) SCO	Tommy Craig	3	0	0	0	0	0	3	0
	MF	(Scotland) SCO	David Fagan	11	9	7	9	1	0	3	0
	MF	(Scotland) SCO	Tommy Ferns	29	0	23	0	0	0	6	0
	MF	(Scotland) SCO	Freddie Glidden	42	0	31	0	1	0	10	0
	MF	(Scotland) SCO	Peter Haggerty	3	0	3	0	0	0	0	0
	MF	(Scotland) SCO	John Hardie	3	0	3	0	0	0	0	0
	MF	(Scotland) SCO	Jim Kilgannon	25	1	24	1	1	0	0	0
	MF	(Scotland) SCO	Hugh Murney	18	0	17	0	1	0	0	0
	FW	(Scotland) SCO	John Bryce	15	9	7	4	0	0	8	5
	FW	(Scotland) SCO	Burns	1	0	1	0	0	0	0	0
	FW	(Scotland) SCO	Billy Collings	12	6	11	6	1	0	0	0
	FW	(Scotland) SCO	Bobby Crum	2	0	0	0	0	0	2	0
	FW	(Scotland) SCO	Alex Duchart	20	11	10	8	0	0	10	3
	FW	(Scotland) SCO	Fleming	1	0	1	0	0	0	0	0
	FW	(Scotland) SCO	Hugh Gallacher	10	9	10	9	0	0	0	0
	FW	(Scotland) SCO	Pat McGinlay	2	0	1	0	0	0	1	0
	FW	(Scotland) SCO	Johnny MacKenzie	31	7	30	7	1	0	0	0
	FW	(Scotland) SCO	Gerry Murnin	10	0	10	0	0	0	0	0
	FW	(Scotland) SCO	Danny O'Donnell	1	0	1	0	0	0	0	0
	FW	(Scotland) SCO	Bert Ormond	30	10	20	7	1	0	9	3
	FW	(Scotland) SCO	Denis Smith	13	4	6	1	0	0	7	3
	FW	(Scotland) SCO	Charlie Stewart	12	6	12	6	0	0	0	0
	FW	(Scotland) SCO	George Tulloch	8	6	8	6	0	0	0	0
	FW	(Scotland) SCO	Tom Whalen	34	12	23	8	1	0	10	4
	FW	(Scotland) SCO	Trialists	3	0	3	0	0	0	0	0

=== Transfers ===
Amongst those players joining and leaving the club were the following:

==== Players in ====
Player	From	Date
(Scotland) Bert Ormond	(Scotland) Airdrie	11 Jun 1960
(Scotland) Tommy Ferns	(Scotland) Baillieston	18 Jun 1960
(Scotland) John Bryce	(Scotland) Baillieston	21 Jun 1960
(Scotland) Denis Smith	(Scotland) Vale of Leven	21 Jun 1960
(Scotland) Charlie Hamill	(Scotland) Third Lanark	30 Jun 1960
(Scotland) Jim Kilgannon	(Scotland) Montrose	24 Sep 1960
(Scotland) Johnny MacKenzie	(Scotland) Partick Thistle	24 Sep 1960
(Scotland) Hugh Murney	(Scotland) Morton	17 Dec 1960
(Scotland) Billy Collings	(Scotland) Morton	28 Jan 1961

==== Players out ====
Player	To	Date
(Scotland) Tommy Craig	(Scotland) East Stirling	4 Nov 1960
(Scotland) Alex Duchart	(Scotland) Falkirk	4 Nov 1960
(Scotland) John Bryce	(Scotland) Freed	2 Mar 1961
(Scotland) Tommy Ferns	(Scotland) Freed	30 Apr 1961
(Scotland) Charlie Hamill	(Scotland) Freed	30 Apr 1961
(Scotland) Denis Smith	(Scotland) Freed	30 Apr 1961
(Scotland) Tom Whalen	(Scotland) Freed	30 Apr 1961
(Scotland) Bert Ormond	(New Zealand) Emigrated	

== Reserve team ==
Dumbarton played only one competitive 'reserve' match in the Scottish Second XI Cup, heavily defeated by Kilmarnock in the first round.
