= 1958–59 Dumbarton F.C. season =

Dumbarton
1958–1959 season
- Manager: Peter McGown
- Stadium: Boghead Park, Dumbarton
- Scottish League Division 2: 4th
- Scottish Cup: Second Round
- Scottish League Cup: Prelims
- Top goalscorer: League: Hugh Gallacher (23); All: Hugh Gallacher (26)

The 1958–59 season was the 75th football season in which Dumbarton competed at a Scottish national level, entering the Scottish Football League, the Scottish Cup and the Scottish League Cup. In addition Dumbarton played in the Stirlingshire Cup.

== Scottish Second Division ==
This was to be another 'almost' season for Dumbarton in Division 2, but as in the previous campaign the final run-in was to be decisive with only one win taken from the last six games. It was to be 4th place again, with 45 points, 15 behind champions Ayr United.

20 August 1958 Division 2	Alloa Athletic	3–5	Dumbarton	Recreation Park, Alloa
	Gillespie 10'; White; Hunter 84' (pen.)		Brown, L 12'; Smillie 39', 46', 69'; Whalen 76'	Referee: F Alexander

3 September 1958 Division 2	Dumbarton	2–3	Brechin City	Boghead Park
	Stewart 20'; Gallacher 70'		Stormont 4', 42'; Duncan 57'	Referee: R Rodger

6 September 1958 Division 2	Dumbarton	1–0	Queens Park	Boghead Park
	McBriar 50'			Attendance: 2,500; Referee: A Crossman

10 September 1958 Division 2	East Stirling	3–2	Dumbarton	Firs Park
	Govan 48' (o.g.); Boyd, A 54', 76' (pen.)		Gallacher 18'; Wilson 41' (o.g.)	Referee: T Fitzpatrick

13 September 1958 Division 2	Montrose	1–6	Dumbarton	Links Park
	Selway 20'		Smillie 3', 67', 74'; Whalen 32', 36'; Stewart 82'	Attendance: 1,919; Referee: J Mowat

16 September 1958 Division 2	Brechin City	2–1	Dumbarton	Glebe Park, Brechin
	Birse 18', 46'		Smillie 27'	Attendance: 1,200; Referee: J Forbes

20 September 1958 Division 2	Dumbarton	4–3	Dundee United	Boghead Park
	Brown, L 25'; Combe 54', 85' (pen.); Smillie 58'		McDonald 49'; Martin 51'; Hunter 55' (pen.)	Attendance: 4,000; Referee: T Wharton

27 September 1958 Division 2	Berwick Rangers	0–3	Dumbarton	Shielfield Park
			Whalen 65'; Silcock 87' (o.g.); Smillie 88'	Attendance: 1,913; Referee: J Holborn

4 October 1958 Division 2	Dumbarton	6–1	Morton	Boghead Park
	Stewart 12' 71'; Smith 38' 82'		Kiernan 66'	Attendance: 5,500; Referee: D McTaggart

11 October 1958 Division 2	St Johnstone	1–1	Dumbarton	Muirton Park
	Docherty 64'		Smith 63'	Attendance: 4,600; Referee: W Syme

18 October 1958 Division 2	Dumbarton	4–2	Cowdenbeath	Boghead Park
	Smillie 15', 32', 34', 74'		Clarke 13'; Murphy 88' (pen.)	Referee: E Cowan

25 October 1958 Division 2	Stranraer	2–3	Dumbarton	Stair Park
	Egan 26' (pen.); Finnie 85'		Beveridge 65'; Cunningham 73'; Smith 75'	Referee: A McClintock

1 November 1958 Division 2	Dumbarton	1–2	Ayr United	Boghead Park
	Stewart 38'		McMillan 22'; Price 26'	Attendance: 7,000; Referee: R Davidson

8 November 1958 Division 2	Arbroath	5–4	Dumbarton	Gayfield Park
	Easson 19', 30', 47', 62' (pen.), 72'		Gallacher 16', 27', 43', 86'	Attendance: 3,173; Referee: G Mitchell

22 November 1958 Division 2	Stenhousemuir	2–0	Dumbarton	Ochilview Park
	Kilgannon 48'; Stewart 66'			Attendance: 3,500; Referee: J Holborn

29 November 1958 Division 2	Albion Rovers	1–2	Dumbarton	Cliftonhill Stadium
	Fagan 31'		Smith 24'; Gallacher 80'	Attendance: 1,000; Referee: W Harvey

6 December 1958 Division 2	Dumbarton	1–1	Forfar Athletic	Boghead Park
	Gallacher 43'		Craig 29'	Attendance: 2,000; Referee: T Wharton

13 December 1958 Division 2	East Fife	2–6	Dumbarton	Bayview Park, Methil
	Bryce 81'; Stirrat 88'		Whalen 9', 17', 35'; Donnachie 20', 55'; Gallacher 71'	Attendance: 2,000; Referee: T Alexander

20 December 1958 Division 2	Dumbarton	6–3	Hamilton	Boghead Park
	Donnachie 4', 56'; Gallacher 20', 51', 85'; Combe 37'		McLean 21'; Blair 68', 80'	Attendance: 4,000; Referee: W Syme

27 December 1958 Division 2	Dumbarton	1–1	Alloa Athletic	Boghead Park
	Combe 17'		Docherty 7'	Attendance: 3,000; Referee: W Brittle

1 January 1959 Division 2	Queens Park	2–4	Dumbarton	Hampden Park
	Church		Gallacher 9'; McDonald; Combe	Attendance: 2,654; Referee: R Morris

3 January 1959 Division 2	Dumbarton	3–1	Montrose	Boghead Park
	Gallacher 39'; Combe 45'; McCormack 59'		Mearns 70'	Attendance: 4,000; Referee: G Mitchell

10 January 1959 Division 2	Dundee United	1–1	Dumbarton	Tannadice Park
	McDonald 36'		Whalen 9'	Attendance: 3,000; Referee: R Rodger

24 January 1959 Division 2	Morton	1–1	Dumbarton	Cappielow Park
	McAllister 35'		Gallacher 52'	Attendance: 5,000; Referee: D Weir

7 February 1959 Division 2	Dumbarton	1–1	St Johnstone	Boghead Park
	Govan 84' (pen.)		Walker 10'	Referee: F Crossley

21 February 1959 Division 2	Dumbarton	4–1	Stranraer	Boghead Park
	Whalen 23'; Cunningham 55'; Combe; Brown, L		Trialist 26'	Attendance: 1,200; Referee: G Mitchell

28 February 1959 Division 2	Dumbarton	5–0	East Fife	Boghead Park
	Gallacher 17', 76'; Craig 38'; Smith 60'; Stewart 70'			Attendance: 2,000; Referee: D Weir

7 March 1959 Division 2	Dumbarton	2–0	Arbroath	Boghead Park
	Gallacher 55'; Stewart 56'			Attendance: 5,100; Referee: A McClintock

21 March 1959 Division 2	Dumbarton	5–1	Stenhousemuir	Boghead Park
	Smith 12', 30', 40' (pen.); Stewart		Kilgannon 48'	Referee: J Stewart

28 March 1959 Division 2	Dumbarton	2–0	Albion Rovers	Boghead Park
	Stewart 69'; Gallacher 84'			Attendance: 4,000; Referee: A McClintock

4 April 1959 Division 2	Forfar Athletic	3–1	Dumbarton	Station Park, Forfar
	Craig 33', 87'; Dick 36'		Smith 65'	Attendance: 1,600; Referee: A Crossman

18 April 1959 Division 2	Hamilton	4–1	Dumbarton	Douglas Park
	McLean 9'; McGuire 56'; Currie 58'; Dignam 66'		Gray 6'	Attendance: 2,500; Referee: W Syme

20 April 1959 Division 2	Cowdenbeath	2–2	Dumbarton	Central Park, Cowdenbeath
	Scott; Gilfillan		Stewart 13'; Lindsay (o.g.)	Attendance: 1,000; Referee: W Massie

25 April 1959 Division 2	Dumbarton	2–1	East Stirling	Boghead Park
	Gallacher 31', 90'		Duffy 75'	Attendance: 2,500; Referee: E Cowan

27 April 1959 Division 2	Ayr United	3–1	Dumbarton	Somerset Park
	Price 5', 14'; McGhee		Gallacher 67'	Referee: F Crossley

29 April 1959 Division 2	Dumbarton	0–2	Berwick Rangers	Boghead Park
			Gemmill 34'; Addison 81'	Referee: T Wharton

== Scottish League Cup ==
In the League Cup, qualification was there for the taking, with 3 wins and a draw from the first 5 games, but a final home defeat to Arbroath meant that Dumbarton would miss out again on progression.

9 August 1958 Group 7	Dumbarton	3–3	Queens Park	Boghead Park
	Brown, L 9'; Beveridge 61'; Stewart 89'		Cromar 36' (pen.); Murney 44' (o.g.); Kane 55'	Attendance: 5,013; Referee: F Crossley

13 August 1958 Group 7	Alloa Athletic	1–3	Dumbarton	Recreation Park, Alloa
	Hunter		Stewart; Combe	Referee: J Weir

16 August 1958 Group 7	Arbroath	6–3	Dumbarton	Gayfield Park
	Easson 13', 24', 26'; Fernie 30'; Brown 62'; Sherriffs 67'		Brown, L 30', 32'; Stewart 20'	Attendance: 3,524; Referee: J Bisset

23 August 1958 Group 7	Queens Park	0–3	Dumbarton	Hampden Park
			Brown, L 29'; Smillie 40', 88'	Attendance: 5,000; Referee: J Mackie

27 August 1958 Group 7	Dumbarton	3–1	Alloa Athletic	Boghead Park
	Brown, L 49' (pen.), 71'; Smillie 59'		Reid 43'	Attendance: 4,400; Referee: A McClintock

30 August 1958 Group 7	Dumbarton	0–1	Arbroath	Boghead Park
			Easson 86'	Attendance: 6,500; Referee: R Davidson

== Scottish Cup ==
In the Scottish Cup, after a good win over Highland League opposition, Division 1 opponents Kilmarnock were to prove to be too good for Dumbarton in the second round.

31 January 1959 Cup round 1	Dumbarton	4–0	Buckie Thistle	Boghead Park
	Stewart 23'; Gallacher 55', 60'; Combe 86'			Attendance: 6,313; Referee: A McClintock

14 February 1959 Cup round 2	Dumbarton	2–8	Kilmarnock	Boghead Park
	Whalen 38'; Gallacher 67'		Wentzel 14', 65', 78'; Burns 22'; Mays 37' (pen.); McBride 45', 55' (pen.), 72'	Attendance: 10,804; Referee: R Davidson

== Stirlingshire Cup ==
Locally Dumbarton lost out to Stenhousemuir in the semi-final of the Stirlingshire Cup.

8 December 1958 First Round	Alloa Athletic	0–4	Dumbarton	Recreation Park, Alloa
			Donnachie; Combe; Brown, L Gallacher

10 March 1959 Semi-final	Stenhousemuir	2–1	Dumbarton	Ochilview Park
	Stewart; Kilgannon		Smith

== Friendlies ==
Amongst the friendlies played during the season were three matches against English opposition - a 'home and away' tie against Accrington Stanley and an away trip to Colchester United.

6 October 1958 Friendly	Dumbarton	1–1	Raith Rovers	Boghead Park
	Whalen 30' (pen.)		Conn 18'	Attendance: 3,000; Referee: T Wharton

20 October 1958 Friendly	Dumbarton	1–1	(England) Accrington Stanley	Boghead Park
	Stewart 50'		Scott 68'	Attendance: 5,000; Referee: W Bruce

3 November 1958 Friendly	(England) Accrington Stanley	2–0	Dumbarton	Peel Park (stadium)
	Stinson 17'; Tighe 62'			Attendance: 2,000

17 November 1958 Friendly	Dumbarton	1–0	Scottish Command XI (Army)	Boghead Park
	Trialist 70'

22 December 1958 Friendly	Dumbarton	5–3	Johnstone Burgh	Boghead Park
	McInnes; Smillie; Symington; McCormack		McSorley; Murney

7 April 1959 Friendly	Morton	1–4	Dumbarton	Boghead Park
	Beaton		Whalen; Stewart; Gallacher

13 April 1959 Friendly	(England) Colchester United	4–1	Dumbarton	Layer Road
	Wright 8'; Johnstone		Whalen 80'	Attendance: 4,000

== Player statistics ==
No.	Pos	Nat	Player	Total		Second Division		Scottish Cup		League Cup	
No.	Pos	Nat	Player	Apps	Goals	Apps	Goals	Apps	Goals	Apps	Goals
	GK	(Scotland) SCO	John Bonnar	30	0	25	0	2	0	3	0
	GK	(Scotland) SCO	Con Murray	14	0	11	0	0	0	3	0
	DF	(Scotland) SCO	Tommy Govan	37	1	32	1	2	0	3	0
	DF	(Scotland) SCO	Jim Gray	3	1	3	1	0	0	0	0
	DF	(Scotland) SCO	Andy Jardine	44	0	36	0	2	0	6	0
	DF	(Scotland) SCO	Jack McDade	1	0	1	0	0	0	0	0
	DF	(Scotland) SCO	Bobby Paterson	3	0	0	0	0	0	3	0
	MF	(Scotland) SCO	Tommy Craig	44	1	36	1	2	0	6	0
	MF	(Scotland) SCO	George Cunningham	42	2	36	2	2	0	4	0
	MF	(Scotland) SCO	Peter Haggerty	3	0	0	0	0	0	3	0
	MF	(Scotland) SCO	Frank McBriar	1	1	1	1	0	0	0	0
	MF	(Scotland) SCO	John McCall	11	0	11	0	0	0	0	0
	MF	(Scotland) SCO	Jim McCormack	6	1	3	1	1	0	2	0
	MF	(Scotland) SCO	Bobby McInnes	2	0	2	0	0	0	0	0
	MF	(Scotland) SCO	John Smith	38	11	31	11	2	0	5	0
	FW	(Scotland) SCO	Ian Beveridge	3	2	2	1	0	0	1	1
	FW	(Scotland) SCO	Jim Brown	1	0	1	0	0	0	0	0
	FW	(Scotland) SCO	Les Brown	43	9	35	3	2	0	6	6
	FW	(Scotland) SCO	Tommy Brown	2	0	2	0	0	0	0	0
	FW	(Scotland) SCO	Stevie Chalmers	1	0	1	0	0	0	0	0
	FW	(Scotland) SCO	Bobby Combe	31	9	24	7	2	1	5	1
	FW	(Scotland) SCO	Alex Donnachie	15	4	12	4	0	0	3	0
	FW	(Scotland) SCO	Hugh Gallacher	26	26	24	23	2	3	0	0
	FW	(Scotland) SCO	McDonald	1	1	1	1	0	0	0	0
	FW	(Scotland) SCO	Jimmy Smillie	14	16	11	13	0	0	3	3
	FW	(Scotland) SCO	Charlie Stewart	39	17	32	12	1	1	6	4
	FW	(Scotland) SCO	Willie Symington	1	0	1	0	0	0	0	0
	FW	(Scotland) SCO	Tom Whalen	27	10	21	9	2	1	4	0
	FW	(Scotland) SCO	Trialist	1	0	1	0	0	0	0	0

=== Transfers ===
Amongst those players joining and leaving the club were the following:

==== Players in ====
Player	From	Date
(Scotland) Jimmy Smillie	(England) Bedford Town	9 Aug 1958
(Scotland) John Bonnar	(Scotland) Celtic	23 Aug 1958
(Scotland) Bobby Combe	(Scotland) Hibernian	23 Sep 1958

==== Players out ====
Player	To	Date
(Scotland) Jimmy Smillie	(Scotland) Stenhousemuir	14 Jan 1959
(Scotland) Bobby Gibson	(Scotland) Berwick Rangers	24 Jan 1959
(Scotland) Con Murray	(Scotland) Forfar Ath	30 Apr 1959
(Scotland) Ian Beveridge	(Scotland) Freed	30 Apr 1959
(Scotland) John Bonnar	(Scotland) Freed	30 Apr 1959
(Scotland) John McCall	(Scotland) Freed	30 Apr 1959

== Reserve team ==
Dumbarton played a 'reserve' team in the Combined Reserve League. The season was split into two 'series' - with Dumbarton finishing runners up to Morton in the First Series (with 4 wins and 2 draws from 8 games) and winning the Second (with 6 wins from 8 games).

In addition, Dumbarton entered the Scottish Second XI Cup but were knocked out in the first round by Rangers.
