= 1961–62 Dumbarton F.C. season =

Dumbarton
1961–1962 season
- Manager: Bobby Campbell
- Stadium: Boghead Park, Dumbarton
- Scottish League Division 2: 17th
- Scottish Cup: Second Round
- Scottish League Cup: Prelims
- Top goalscorer: League: Charlie Stewart (9); All: Charlie Stewart (12)
Home colours

The 1961–62 season was the 78th football season in which Dumbarton competed at a Scottish national level, entering the Scottish Football League, the Scottish Cup and the Scottish League Cup. In addition Dumbarton competed in the Stirlingshire Cup.

== Scottish Second Division ==
Following six seasons of top half finishes in the league, season 1961–62 was to prove disastrous, with Dumbarton slumping to finish in 17th place with 28 points, 26 behind champions Clyde.

23 August 1961 Division 2	Dumbarton	2–3	Stenhousemuir	Boghead Park
	Stewart		Shaw; McCulloch (pen.); Bryce	Attendance: 3,000; Referee: W Syme

6 September 1961 Division 2	Dumbarton	3–0	Stranraer	Boghead Park
	McKenzie 18'; Ward 24', 88'			Referee: R Davidson

9 September 1961 Division 2	Berwick Rangers	2–1	Dumbarton	Shielfield Park
	Imrie 65' trialist		Ward 40'	Attendance: 2,012; Referee: E Cowan

13 September 1961 Division 2	Stranraer	2–2	Dumbarton	Stair Park
	Hanlon 10'; Mcintyre 52'		Neeson 25'; Murney 30'	Attendance: 1,500

16 September 1961 Division 2	Dumbarton	4–1	East Stirling	Boghead Park
	Stewart 18', 22', 51'; Ward 25'		Mulholland 36'	Attendance: 2,500; Referee: H Phillips

20 September 1961 Division 2	Clyde	2–2	Dumbarton	Shawfield Stadium
	Colraine 70'; Steele 75'		Murney 8' (pen.); Neeson 21'	Attendance: 2,541; Referee: G Bowman

27 September 1961 Division 2	Dumbarton	1–3	Clyde	Boghead Park
	Neeson 70'		Currie 23'; Steele 78', 89'	Attendance: 2,901; Referee: J Paterson

30 September 1961 Division 2	Dumbarton	2–5	Brechin City	Boghead Park
	MacKenzie 22'; Jardine 49'		Reid, J 10', 36'; Ross 25'; Flitchett 34'; Mulhall 75'	Attendance: 2,300; Referee: D Minto

7 October 1961 Division 2	Ayr United	3–0	Dumbarton	Somerset Park
	Fulton 58'; McIntyre, W 72'; McIntyre, A 82'			Attendance: 3,500; Referee: W Mullen

14 October 1961 Division 2	Dumbarton	2–2	Arbroath	Boghead Park
	Stewart 20'; McEwan 88'		Matthews 15'; Keddie 25'	Attendance: 1,500; Referee: W Syme

21 October 1961 Division 2	Dumbarton	2–2	Forfar Athletic	Boghead Park
	MacKenzie 27' (pen.), 66' (pen.)		Brodie 13'; Bunthrone 26'	Attendance: 1,500; Referee: F Minto

28 October 1961 Division 2	Morton	1–3	Dumbarton	Cappielow Park
	O'Hara 78'		McEwan 24'; Stewart 71'; Neeson	Attendance: 6,500; Referee: D Weir

4 November 1961 Division 2	Queen of the South	4–1	Dumbarton	Palmerston Park
	Robertson 2'; McMillan 40', 62'; Potterson 43'		Stewart 67'	Attendance: 4,000; Referee: T Wharton

11 November 1961 Division 2	Dumbarton	1–0	Cowdenbeath	Boghead Park
	Black, A 38'			Referee: J Blair

18 November 1961 Division 2	East Fife	3–0	Dumbarton	Bayview Park, Methil
	Stewart 30', 46'; Dewar 36'			Attendance: 2,000; Referee: S Crossley

25 November 1961 Division 2	Hamilton	3–1	Dumbarton	Douglas Park
	Hastings 39'; Ferns 47'; King 65'		Gallacher 36'	Attendance: 1,000; Referee: R Davidson

2 December 1961 Division 2	Dumbarton	0–2	Montrose	Boghead Park
			Kemp 16'; Ferrie 85'	Attendance: 1,000; Referee: T Alexander

16 December 1961 Division 2	Albion Rovers	2–1	Dumbarton	Cliftonhill Stadium
	McQuarrie 6', 34'		McMillan 1'	Attendance: 400; Referee: R Rodger

23 December 1961 Division 2	Queen's Park	3–0	Dumbarton	Hampden Park
	Boardman 16'; Houston 22', 78'			Attendance: 1,200; Referee: W Fyfe

6 January 1962 Division 2	Stenhousemuir	2–1	Dumbarton	Ochilview Park
	Glegg 44'; Brannigan 88'		Lochhead 45'	Attendance: 1,500; Referee: A McKenzie

20 January 1962 Division 2	Brechin City	0–2	Dumbarton	Glebe Park, Brechin
			McMillan 47'; Lochhead 70'	Attendance: 400; Referee: J Gordon

3 February 1962 Division 2	Dumbarton	1–3	Ayr United	Boghead Park
	McMillan 87'		Glidden 71'; Gibson 77'; Frew 86'	Attendance: 800; Referee: H Phillips

10 February 1962 Division 2	Arbroath	1–0	Dumbarton	Gayfield Park
	Easson 73'			Attendance: 1,800; Referee: A Crossman

17 February 1962 Division 2	Forfar Athletic	4–4	Dumbarton	Station Park, Forfar
	Trialist 33'; Scott 7'; Smith 30'; Coburn 47'		Neeson 6'; McCorquodale 62'; McMillan 70' (pen.); Stewart 85'	Attendance: 1,000; Referee: W Fyfe

24 February 1962 Division 2	Dumbarton	2–2	Morton	Boghead Park
	McMillan 55'; McCorquodale 75'		Cowie 65' (pen.); Kelly 82'	Attendance: 2,500; Referee: F Crossley

3 March 1962 Division 2	Dumbarton	0–2	Queen of the South	Boghead Park
			Murney 5'; McTurk 60'	Attendance: 2,000; Referee: W Elliot

10 March 1962 Division 2	Cowdenbeath	0–1	Dumbarton	Central Park, Cowdenbeath
			Govan 75'	Attendance: 1,000; Referee: W Massie

17 March 1962 Division 2	Dumbarton	3–0	East Fife	Boghead Park
	McCorquodale 32', 77'; Govan 53'			Attendance: 2,000; Referee: T Wharton

24 March 1962 Division 2	Dumbarton	2–0	Hamilton	Boghead Park
	McMillan 25'; Webb 51'			Attendance: 1,500; Referee: W Syme

31 March 1962 Division 2	Montrose	4–0	Dumbarton	Links Park
	Kemp 10', 61'; Gardiner 35', 76'			Attendance: 1,000; Referee: G Bowman

7 April 1962 Division 2	Dumbarton	2–1	Albion Rovers	Boghead Park
	Webb 22'; Neeson 58'		Trialist 51'	Attendance: 1,000; Referee: E Cowan

9 April 1962 Division 2	East Stirling	1–0	Dumbarton	Firs Park
	Munro 20'

13 April 1962 Division 2	Dumbarton	0–0	Berwick Rangers	Boghead Park
				Referee: D Weir

20 April 1962 Division 2	Dumbarton	0–0	Queen's Park	Boghead Park
				Referee: A MacKenzie

25 April 1962 Division 2	Dumbarton	2–2	Alloa Athletic	Boghead Park
	Miller		Smith (pen.); Docherty 75'	Referee: J Paterson

28 April 1962 Division 2	Alloa Athletic	1–1	Dumbarton	Recreation Park, Alloa
	Jamieson 63'		Miller 87'	Attendance: 500; Referee: W Brittle

== Scottish League Cup ==
The League Cup sectional ties produced only one win from six games, resulting in no further interest in the competition.

12 August 1961 Group 8	Ayr United	3–1	Dumbarton	Somerset Park
	McIntyre 37'; McGhee 42', 85'		McEwan 23'	Attendance: 4,500; Referee: R Rodger

16 August 1961 Group 8	Dumbarton	0–1	Falkirk	Boghead Park
			Murray	Referee: J Mackie

19 August 1961 Group 8	Cowdenbeath	4–3	Dumbarton	Central Park, Cowdenbeath
	Black; Allison; Robertson 62' (pen.); McIntosh 74'		McEwan	Attendance: 2,000; Referee: T Alexander

26 August 1961 Group 8	Dumbarton	1–2	Ayr United	Boghead Park
	Stewart 2'		McMillan 6'; McIntyre 40'	Attendance: 3,000; Referee: W Syme

30 August 1961 Group 8	Falkirk	3–0	Dumbarton	Brockville Park
	Oliver 20'; Reid 54'; Ormond 62'			Referee: W Brittle

2 September 1961 Group 8	Dumbarton	2–1	Cowdenbeath	Boghead Park
	Murney; Stewart		Goal	Referee: F Crossley

== Scottish Cup ==
Dumbarton embarrassingly lost out in the second round of the Cup to Highland League opponents Ross County, having received a first round bye.

27 January 1962 Cup round 2	Dumbarton	2–3	Ross County	Boghead Park
	Stewart 26'; Lochhead 44'		Urquhart 52'; Wilson 63'; Oates 75'	Attendance: 3,326; Referee: J Blair

== Stirlingshire Cup ==
Dumbarton lost out to East Stirling in the semi-final of the county cup.

6 March 1962 Semi-final	East Stirling	4–2	Dumbarton	Firs Park
	Swan; Columbine; McGill		Webb; McMillan

=== Friendlies ===
6 November 1961 Friendly	Dumbarton	6–1	Vale of Leven	Boghead Park
	Murney 65'; Bain; Gallacher; Webb		Smith 60'

13 January 1962 Friendly	Dumbarton	3–0	Scottish Amateur XI	Boghead Park
	Rooney 31'; Stewart 60'; Neeson 75'			Referee: W Morrison

== Player statistics ==
=== Squad ===
No.	Pos	Nat	Player	Total		Second Division		Scottish Cup		League Cup	
No.	Pos	Nat	Player	Apps	Goals	Apps	Goals	Apps	Goals	Apps	Goals
	GK	(Scotland) SCO	Willie Burgess	1	0	1	0	0	0	0	0
	GK	(Scotland) SCO	Maurice Crawford	10	0	10	0	0	0	0	0
	GK	(Scotland) SCO	Jim Cumming	9	0	6	0	0	0	3	0
	GK	(Scotland) SCO	Bill Eadie	1	0	1	0	0	0	0	0
	GK	(Scotland) SCO	Jim Gowans	10	0	9	0	1	0	0	0
	GK	(Scotland) SCO	Ian McDonald	3	0	3	0	0	0	0	0
	GK	(Scotland) SCO	Doug Robertson	5	0	2	0	0	0	3	0
	DF	(Scotland) SCO	Chris Alexander	9	0	9	0	0	0	0	0
	DF	(Scotland) SCO	Alan Black	5	0	3	0	0	0	2	0
	DF	(Scotland) SCO	Tommy Govan	34	2	28	2	0	0	6	0
	DF	(Scotland) SCO	Andy Jardine	32	1	28	1	0	0	4	0
	DF	(Scotland) SCO	Charlie McCorquodale	30	4	29	4	1	0	0	0
	MF	(Scotland) SCO	Gordon Black	26	1	19	1	1	0	6	0
	MF	(Scotland) SCO	George Cameron	2	0	2	0	0	0	0	0
	MF	(Scotland) SCO	Freddie Glidden	40	0	33	0	1	0	6	0
	MF	(Scotland) SCO	Jim Kelly	1	0	1	0	0	0	0	0
	MF	(Scotland) SCO	Jim Kilgannon	31	0	25	0	1	0	5	0
	MF	(Scotland) SCO	James Morrison	4	0	4	0	0	0	0	0
	MF	(Scotland) SCO	Hugh Murney	23	3	20	2	0	0	3	1
	MF	(Scotland) SCO	Bobby Pinkerton	5	0	2	0	0	0	3	0
	MF	(Scotland) SCO	Gordon Tosh	1	0	1	0	0	0	0	0
	FW	(Scotland) SCO	John Bain	3	0	1	0	0	0	2	0
	FW	(Scotland) SCO	Billy Collings	1	0	0	0	0	0	1	0
	FW	(Scotland) SCO	Hugh Gallacher	8	1	6	1	0	0	2	0
	FW	(Scotland) SCO	Pat Henderson	1	0	1	0	0	0	0	0
	FW	(Scotland) SCO	Ian Lochhead	5	3	4	2	1	1	0	0
	FW	(Scotland) SCO	Ian McEwan	12	6	9	2	0	0	3	4
	FW	(Scotland) SCO	John McGuire	1	0	1	0	0	0	0	0
	FW	(Scotland) SCO	Bobby McIntyre	17	0	16	0	1	0	0	0
	FW	(Scotland) SCO	Billy McIvor	5	0	1	0	0	0	4	0
	FW	(Scotland) SCO	Johnny MacKenzie	21	4	16	4	0	0	5	0
	FW	(Scotland) SCO	Tommy McMillan	13	6	12	6	1	0	0	0
	FW	(Scotland) SCO	Eddie Meechan	2	0	2	0	0	0	0	0
	FW	(Scotland) SCO	Jim Merrylees	1	0	1	0	0	0	0	0
	FW	(Scotland) SCO	Jimmy Miller	12	3	12	3	0	0	0	0
	FW	(Scotland) SCO	Alec Morrison	1	0	1	0	0	0	0	0
	FW	(Scotland) SCO	Jackie Neeson	18	6	17	6	1	0	0	0
	FW	(Scotland) SCO	Benny Rooney	7	0	6	0	1	0	0	0
	FW	(Scotland) SCO	Calum Samuel	2	0	2	0	0	0	0	0
	FW	(Scotland) SCO	Les Sneddon	1	0	1	0	0	0	0	0
	FW	(Scotland) SCO	Charlie Stewart	29	12	22	9	1	1	6	2
	FW	(Scotland) SCO	Jim Vernon	1	0	1	0	0	0	0	0
	FW	(Scotland) SCO	John Ward	12	4	10	4	0	0	2	0
	FW	(Scotland) SCO	Jackie Webb	9	2	9	2	0	0	0	0
	FW	(Scotland) SCO	Trialists	6	0	6	0	0	0	0	0

=== International Caps ===
John Neeson earned his first and second caps playing for Scotland Amateurs against Wales on 3 March and England on 16 March respectively.

=== Transfers ===
Amongst those players joining and leaving the club were the following:

==== Players in ====
Player	From	Date
(Scotland) Alan Black	(Scotland) Drumchapel Am	24 Jun 1961
(Scotland) Charlie McCorquodale	(Scotland) Berwick Rangers	2 Sep 1961
(Scotland) Benny Rooney	(Scotland) Celtic (loan)	25 Nov 1961
(Scotland) Tommy McMillan	(Scotland) Queen of the South	23 Dec 1961
(Scotland) Jackie Webb	(Scotland) Amateur status	6 Jan 1962

==== Players out ====
Player	To	Date
(Scotland) Billy Collings	(Scotland) Berwick Rangers	21 Oct 1961
(Scotland) Hugh Murney	(Scotland) Queen of the South	24 Feb 1962
(Scotland) Gordon Black	(Scotland) Freed	30 Apr 1962
(Scotland) Charlie McCorquodale	(Scotland) Freed	30 Apr 1962
(Scotland) Johnny MacKenzie	(Scotland) Freed	30 Apr 1962
(Scotland) Tommy McMillan	(Scotland) Freed	30 Apr 1962
(Scotland) David Fagan	(Australia) Emigrated	

== Reserve team ==
Dumbarton played a team in the Combined Reserve League, but results were poor – finishing 7th and last in the first series with 1 win and 1 draw from 12 matches – and 5th in the second series with 3 wins and 3 draws from 12. In the Scottish Second XI Cup, Dumbarton lost in the first round to Celtic.
