= 1957–58 Dumbarton F.C. season =

Dumbarton
1957–1958 season
- Manager: Peter McGown
- Stadium: Boghead Park, Dumbarton
- Scottish League Division 2: 4th
- Scottish Cup: First Round
- Scottish League Cup: Prelims
- Top goalscorer: League: Hugh Gallacher / Charlie Stewart (23); All: Hugh Gallacher (29)
Home colours

The 1957–58 season was the 74th football season in which Dumbarton competed at a Scottish national level, entering the Scottish Football League, the Scottish Cup and the Scottish League Cup. In addition Dumbarton played in the Stirlingshire Cup.

== Scottish Second Division ==
Dumbarton were to challenge for promotion from Division 2 for most of the season, but a disastrous run in the final five games, where only three points were taken, was to prove to be conclusive and in the end a fourth-place finish was achieved with 44 points, 11 behind champions Stirling Albion.

21 August 1957 Division 2	Albion Rovers	3–1	Dumbarton	Cliftonhill Stadium
	Carson 7', 49'; Harper 31'		Whalen 81'	Attendance: 3,000; Referee: H Phillips

4 September 1957 Division 2	Dumbarton	4–0	Alloa Athletic	Boghead Park
	Gallacher, H 21' (pen.); Cairns 70', 88'; Stewart 75'			Attendance: 4,243; Referee: R Smith

11 September 1957 Division 2	Dumbarton	6–0	Albion Rovers	Boghead Park
	Gallacher, H 29', 50'; Gibson 34', 49'; Smith 78'			Attendance: 6,000; Referee: R Rodger

14 September 1957 Division 2	Dumbarton	1–0	Stranraer	Boghead Park
	Gibson 5'			Attendance: 5,000; Referee: J Mowat

18 September 1957 Division 2	Alloa Athletic	4–3	Dumbarton	Recreation Park, Alloa
	Hunter 8'; Docherty 46', 70'; Trialist 89'		Cairns 15'; Gallacher, H 48'; Gibson	Attendance: 1,000; Referee: J Mackie

21 September 1957 Division 2	Morton	0–0	Dumbarton	Cappielow Park
				Referee: G Bowman

28 September 1957 Division 2	Dumbarton	2–0	Dundee United	Boghead Park
	Gallacher, H 13', 62'			Attendance: 4,000; Referee: F Crossley

5 October 1957 Division 2	Montrose	2–0	Dumbarton	Links Park
	Sandeman 59'; Selway 85'			Attendance: 1,400; Referee: A McClintock

12 October 1957 Division 2	Dumbarton	4–1	Berwick Rangers	Boghead Park
	Gallacher, H 26'; Stewart 32', 35'; McMillan 80'		Hogg 75'	Attendance: 4,000; Referee: T Wharton

19 October 1957 Division 2	Brechin City	5–2	Dumbarton	Glebe Park, Brechin
	Scott 11', 47'; Warrander 15', 71'; Nelson 89'		Brown, L 30'; McMillan 75'	Attendance: 1,500; Referee: D Gerrard

26 October 1957 Division 2	Dumbarton	4–2	Ayr United	Boghead Park
	Stewart 26'; Gallacher, H 34'; Smith 65'		Whittle 27'; Craig 75'	Attendance: 4,000; Referee: G Mitchell

2 November 1957 Division 2	Dumbarton	4–0	Arbroath	Boghead Park
	Brown, L 30', 87'; Stewart 64'; Smith 69'			Attendance: 9,000; Referee: H Phillips

9 November 1957 Division 2	East Stirling	1–2	Dumbarton	Firs Park
	Wilson 45' (pen.)		Gallacher, H 28', 80'	Attendance: 1,500; Referee: D McTaggart

16 November 1957 Division 2	Hamilton	0–3	Dumbarton	Douglas Park
			Gallacher, H 15'; Stewart 43'; McMillan 77'	Referee: R Morris

23 November 1957 Division 2	Dumbarton	1–1	Forfar Athletic	Boghead Park
	Gallacher, H 79'		Ogilvie 57' (pen.)	Attendance: 5,000; Referee: J Cowan

30 November 1957 Division 2	Stenhousemuir	2–4	Dumbarton	Ochilview Park
	Stewart 68'; Kilgannon 73'		Gallacher, H 14', 19'; Stewart 57'; Brown, L 63'	Attendance: 2,000; Referee: R Davidson

7 December 1957 Division 2	Dumbarton	6–0	St Johnstone	Boghead Park
	Stewart 27' (pen.); Gallacher, H 38'; McMillan 43'; Gibson 45'Stewart 75'			Attendance: 4,658; Referee: H Gallacher

14 December 1957 Division 2	Dumbarton	2–0	Dunfermline Athletic	Boghead Park
	Stewart 2'; Gallacher, H 23'			Referee: J Stewart

21 December 1957 Division 2	Stirling Albion	4–1	Dumbarton	Annfield Stadium
	Rankin 5'; Rodger 10'; Spence 20'; Grant 24'		Gallacher, H 47'	Attendance: 5,957; Referee: W Harvey

28 December 1957 Division 2	Dumbarton	6–1	Cowdenbeath	Boghead Park
	Stewart 3', 32', 50'; McMillan		Gilfillan 47'	Attendance: 5,500; Referee: R Rodger

1 January 1958 Division 2	Dumbarton	4–0	Morton	Boghead Park
	Gallacher 1', 85'; Brown, L 5'; Whalen 87'			Attendance: 6,000; Referee: J Mackie

2 January 1958 Division 2	Stranraer	2–1	Dumbarton	Stair Park
	Cron 12'; Small 85'		Stewart 80'	Referee: E Cowan

11 January 1958 Division 2	Dundee United	1–2	Dumbarton	Tannadice Park
	Stephen 73'		Gallacher, H 3'; Stewart 38'	Attendance: 5,000; Referee: R Morris

18 January 1958 Division 2	Dumbarton	3–1	Montrose	Boghead Park
	Stewart 25'; Gallacher, H 42'; Whalen 78'		Selway 47'	Attendance: 4,500; Referee: H Phillips

25 January 1958 Division 2	Berwick Rangers	2–2	Dumbarton	Shielfield Park
	McEwan 8'; McLennan 36'		Gallacher, H 18'; Brown, L 35'	Attendance: 443; Referee: A Crossman

15 February 1958 Division 2	Ayr United	4–0	Dumbarton	Somerset Park
	McIntyre 25'; Price 44', 54'; McMillan 57'			Attendance: 6,000; Referee: G Bowman

22 February 1958 Division 2	Arbroath	3–5	Dumbarton	Gayfield Park
	Brown 21'; Fernie 65'; Sharp 83'		Beveridge 5', 32', 59', 85'; Stewart 74'	Attendance: 3,900; Referee: J Bissett

1 March 1958 Division 2	Dumbarton	1–3	East Stirling	Boghead Park
	Beveridge 2'		Japp 28', 67', 89'	Attendance: 4,000; Referee: J Mackie

8 March 1958 Division 2	Dumbarton	0–1	Hamilton	Boghead Park
			Hastings 51'	Referee: R Davidson

22 March 1958 Division 2	Dumbarton	6–1	Stenhousemuir	Boghead Park
	Whalen 12', 32'; Stewart 19'; Brown 43' (pen.); Beveridge 54'		Campbell 30'	Referee: J Stewart

29 March 1958 Division 2	St Johnstone	2–3	Dumbarton	Muirton Park
	Carr 20'; Ewan 88' (pen.)		Beveridge 10'; Stewart 31'; Donnachie 37'	Attendance: 2,000; Referee: J Holborn

5 April 1958 Division 2	Dunfermline Athletic	3–0	Dumbarton	East End Park
	Peebles 10', 62'; Dickson 40'			Attendance: 7,000

12 April 1958 Division 2	Dumbarton	2–2	Stirling Albion	Boghead Park
	Beveridge 22'; Smith 80'		Spence 6', 30'	Referee: E Cowan

18 April 1958 Division 2	Dumbarton	5–1	Brechin City	Boghead Park
	Brown, L 22'; Beveridge 40', 60'; Stewart 55', 67'		Stewart	Referee: F Crossley

26 April 1958 Division 2	Cowdenbeath	3–2	Dumbarton	Central Park, Cowdenbeath
	Miller 72', 75'; Murphy 76' (pen.)		Whalen 60'; Beveridge 89'	Attendance: 1,000; Referee: G Mitchell

3 May 1958 Division 2	Forfar Athletic	2–0	Dumbarton	Station Park, Forfar
	Russell 19'; Martin 42'			Attendance: 1,500; Referee: W Brittle

== Scottish League Cup ==
Only two wins were achieved in the 6 sectional games of the League Cup, but one of these was a 10–3 thumping of Stranraer.

10 August 1957 Group 5	Stranraer	3–1	Dumbarton	Stair Park
	Quinn 13', 85'; Hunter 50'		Brown, L 12'	Referee: E Cowan

14 August 1957 Group 5	Dumbarton	2–4	Dundee United	Boghead Park
	McMillan 6', 59'		Sturrock 7'; Duncan 43'; Humphries 65'; Coyle 85'	Attendance: 4,000; Referee: W Brittle

17 August 1957 Section 5	Clyde	7–1	Dumbarton	Shawfield Stadium
	Robertson 1', 89'; Herd 18'; Currie 32', 65'; Ring 42' (pen.), 45'		Gallacher, H 75'	Attendance: 8,000; Referee: J Bissett

24 August 1957 Group 5	Dumbarton	10–3	Stranraer	Boghead Park
	Gallacher, H 8', 17', 30', 84'; Gibson 22'; Glover 25'; McMillan 38'; Smith 41'; Whalen 55', 81'		Quinn 6', 47', 65'	Attendance: 2,000; Referee: P Fitzpatrick

28 August 1957 Group 5	Dundee United	0–3	Dumbarton	Tannadice Park
			Gibson 8'; Gallacher, H Whalen 53'	Attendance: 5,000; Referee: T Edwards

31 August 1957 Group 5	Dumbarton	1–4	Clyde	Boghead Park
	Brown, L 53'		Clinton 1'; Ring 5'; Currie 77'; Keogh 86'	Attendance: 7,000; Referee: D Weir

== Scottish Cup ==
Dumbarton received a tough first round draw in the Cup and lost out to eventual champions Clyde.

1 February 1958 Cup round 1	Dumbarton	0–5	Clyde	Boghead Park
			Robertson 5', 47'; Coyle 32', 65'; Ring 67'	Attendance: 13,300; Referee: H Phillips

== Stirlingshire Cup ==
Alloa were to prove too strong for Dumbarton in the semi-final of the county cup.

30 October 1957 First Round	Dumbarton	7–2	East Stirling	Boghead Park
	Stewart 23'; Brown,L 30'; McMillan 40', 50', 57'; Gallacher,H 55'; Smith 87'		Plumb 7', 72'	Attendance: 2,500; Referee: G Mitchell

23 April 1958 Semi-final	Alloa Athletic	6–0	Dumbarton	Recreation Park, Alloa
	Gillespie; Vint; Docherty; White

== Dewar Shield ==
As the previous season's Stirlingshire champions, Dumbarton were drawn to meet the Aberdeenshire Cup holders, Buckie Thistle. As was the case four years earlier, Dumbarton withdrew.

Semi-final	Buckie Thistle	WO	Dumbarton

== Friendlies ==
7 September 1957 Friendly	Dumbarton	8–2	Scottish Command XI (Army)	Boghead Park
	Gallacher, H 13', 89'; Kiernan 37'; McMillan 45', 56', 87'		McSorley 22', 32'	Attendance: 1,700; Referee: W Elliott

23 September 1957 Friendly	Dumbarton	4–4	RAF Command XI	Boghead Park
	Goal		Goal

9 October 1957 Friendly	Dumbarton	2–1	Duntocher Hibs	Boghead Park
	Gallacher, H		Goal	Attendance: 1,374

20 November 1957 Friendly	Dumbarton	4–2	Yoker	Boghead Park
	Goal		Goal

3 February 1958 Friendly	Dumbarton	2–2	Scottish Amateurs XI	Boghead Park
	Gallacher, H 40', 44'		McMillan; King	Referee: M Carroll

3 March 1958 Friendly	Dumbarton	2–1	St Mirren	Boghead Park
	Beveridge 45', 60'		Rodger 85'	Referee: J Carroll

12 March 1958 Friendly	Dumbarton	1–3	Celtic XI	Boghead Park
	Whalen 85'		Crerand; Gallacher	Referee: J Bowman

26 March 1958 Friendly	Dumbarton	4–1	Clydebank Juniors	Boghead Park
	Trialist 41', 76'; Donnachie 71'; Gallacher, H 88'		Elliot 1'	Referee: W Brittle

== Player statistics ==
No.	Pos	Nat	Player	Total		Second Division		Scottish Cup		League Cup	
No.	Pos	Nat	Player	Apps	Goals	Apps	Goals	Apps	Goals	Apps	Goals
	GK	(Scotland) SCO	Con Murray	37	0	36	0	1	0	0	0
	GK	(Scotland) SCO	Eddie O'Donnell	6	0	0	0	0	0	6	0
	DF	(Scotland) SCO	Joe Gallacher	4	0	3	0	0	0	1	0
	DF	(Scotland) SCO	Tommy Govan	1	0	1	0	0	0	0	0
	DF	(Scotland) SCO	Jim Gray	9	0	9	0	0	0	0	0
	DF	(Scotland) SCO	Andy Jardine	38	0	33	0	1	0	4	0
	DF	(Scotland) SCO	John McKay	7	0	4	0	0	0	3	0
	MF	(Scotland) SCO	Benny Cairns	32	3	25	3	1	0	6	0
	MF	(Scotland) SCO	Tommy Craig	42	0	35	0	1	0	6	0
	MF	(Scotland) SCO	George Cunningham	8	0	8	0	0	0	0	0
	MF	(Scotland) SCO	Peter Haggerty	2	0	2	0	0	0	0	0
	MF	(Scotland) SCO	Adam Hogg	6	0	6	0	0	0	0	0
	MF	(Scotland) SCO	Frank McBriar	1	0	1	0	0	0	0	0
	MF	(Scotland) SCO	John McCall	38	0	31	0	1	0	6	0
	MF	(Scotland) SCO	Jim McCormack	2	0	2	0	0	0	0	0
	MF	(Scotland) SCO	Willie McIntyre	1	0	1	0	0	0	0	0
	MF	(Scotland) SCO	John Smith	39	4	32	3	1	0	6	1
	FW	(Scotland) SCO	Ian Beveridge	10	11	10	11	0	0	0	0
	FW	(Scotland) SCO	Jim Brown	1	0	1	0	0	0	0	0
	FW	(Scotland) SCO	Les Brown	38	11	33	9	1	0	4	2
	FW	(Scotland) SCO	Willie Devlin	4	0	0	0	0	0	4	0
	FW	(Scotland) SCO	Alex Donnachie	2	1	2	1	0	0	0	0
	FW	(Scotland) SCO	Hugh Gallacher	30	29	25	23	1	0	4	6
	FW	(Scotland) SCO	Bobby Gibson	18	7	12	5	0	0	6	2
	FW	(Scotland) SCO	John Glover	3	1	1	0	0	0	2	1
	FW	(Scotland) SCO	John McMillan	30	10	24	7	1	0	5	3
	FW	(Scotland) SCO	Charlie Stewart	35	23	34	23	1	0	0	0
	FW	(Scotland) SCO	Willie Symington	5	0	5	0	0	0	0	0
	FW	(Scotland) SCO	Tom Whalen	23	9	18	6	1	0	4	3
	FW	(Scotland) SCO	Trialist	1	0	1	0	0	0	0	0

=== Transfers ===
Amongst those players joining and leaving the club were the following:

==== Players in ====
Player	From	Date
(Scotland) Con Murray	(Scotland) Duntocher Hibs	15 May 1957
(Scotland) John Smith	(Scotland) Stirling Albion	3 Aug 1957
(Scotland) Willie Devlin	(England) Carlisle United	10 Aug 1957
(Scotland) Charlie Stewart	(Scotland) Johnstone Burgh	14 Sep 1957
(Scotland) Tommy Govan	(Scotland) Alva Albion Rangers	8 Mar 1958

==== Players out ====
Player	To	Date
(Scotland) Alex Rollo	(England) Workington	11 Jun 1957
(Scotland) Felix Kiernan	(Scotland) Stenhousemuir	28 Nov 1957
(Scotland) John McMillan	(Wales) Cardiff City	15 Feb 1958
(Scotland) Benny Cairns	(Scotland) Freed	30 Apr 1958
(Scotland) Willie Devlin	(Scotland) Freed	30 Apr 1958
(Scotland) Joe Gallacher	(Scotland) Freed	30 Apr 1958
(Scotland) Billy McKeown	(Scotland) Freed	30 Apr 1958
(Scotland) John Heaney	(Scotland) Retired	
