= 1959–60 Dumbarton F.C. season =

Dumbarton
1959–1960 season
- Manager: Bobby Combe
- Stadium: Boghead Park, Dumbarton
- Scottish League Division 2: 6th
- Scottish Cup: First Round
- Scottish League Cup: Prelims
- Top goalscorer: League: Hugh Gallacher (23); All: Hugh Gallacher (25)

The 1959–60 season was the 76th football season in which Dumbarton competed at a Scottish national level, entering the Scottish Football League, the Scottish Cup and the Scottish League Cup. In addition Dumbarton competed in the Stirlingshire Cup.

== Scottish Second Division ==
A perfect start of 4 wins from the first four games was followed by a run of 13 games with only a single win, meaning that Dumbarton fell away and were never serious challengers for the Division 2 title, finishing in 6th place with 43 points, 10 behind champions St Johnstone.

| 19 August 1959 Division 2 | Stranraer | 0–1 | Dumbarton | Stair Park |
| | | | Gallacher 82' | Attendance: 2,200; Referee: W Harvie |

| 2 September 1959 Division 2 | Dumbarton | 2–1 | Alloa Athletic | Boghead Park |
| | Gallacher 18'; Duchart 72' | | Walker 5' | Attendance: 3,000; Referee: D Weir |

| 5 September 1959 Division 2 | Dumbarton | 3–2 | Queens Park | Boghead Park |
| | Gallacher 3', 55'; Allison 20' | | Kane 18'; Brown 48' | Referee: R Rodger |

| 9 September 1959 Division 2 | Dumbarton | 3–2 | Dundee United | Boghead Park |
| | Duchart 43'; Prentice 59' (pen.); McCulloch 62' | | Gillespie 32'; Irvine 54' | Attendance: 3,000; Referee: G Bowman |

| 12 September 1959 Division 2 | St Johnstone | 7–2 | Dumbarton | Muirton Park |
| | Haughey 43'; Liddell, D 50', 63', 88'; Liddell, J 56', 81'; Carr 84' | | Allison 4'; Gallacher 49' | Attendance: 7,000; Referee: J Mowat |

| 16 September 1959 Division 2 | Alloa Athletic | 1–1 | Dumbarton | Recreation Park, Alloa |
| | Trialist 10' | | Cunningham 35' | Referee: J Mowatt |

| 19 September 1959 Division 2 | Dumbarton | 0–4 | Berwick Rangers | Boghead Park |
| | | | Kennedy 37', 64'; Craig 49', 74' | Referee: W Harvie |

| 23 September 1959 Division 2 | Dundee United | 2–1 | Dumbarton | Tannadice Park |
| | Reid 67'; Irvine 75' | | Anderson 61' | Attendance: 3,600; Referee: T Alexander |

| 26 September 1959 Division 2 | Brechin City | 3–1 | Dumbarton | Glebe Park, Brechin |
| | Thoms 52', 72'; McIntosh 75' | | Allison 70' | Attendance: 1,500; Referee: A Pryde |

| 3 October 1959 Division 2 | Dumbarton | 0–1 | Stenhousemuir | Boghead Park |
| | | | Wallace 50' | Attendance: 3,000; Referee: T Wharton |

| 10 October 1959 Division 2 | East Fife | 2–2 | Dumbarton | Bayview Park, Methil |
| | Gardiner 71'; Reilly 78' | | Duchart 48' (pen.), 63' | Referee: W Fyfe |

| 17 October 1959 Division 2 | Dumbarton | 1–3 | Queen of the South | Boghead Park |
| | Anderson 1' | | Garrett 20'; Black 41'; McEwan 43' | Attendance: 1,850; Referee: W Syme |

| 24 October 1959 Division 2 | Dumbarton | 4–1 | Forfar Athletic | Boghead Park |
| | McCulloch 23'; Anderson 29'; Gallacher 66', 85' | | McGrory 55' | Attendance: 3,500; Referee: P Fitzpatrick |

| 7 November 1959 Division 2 | Morton | 3–2 | Dumbarton | Cappielow Park |
| | Stewart 44', 60'; Craig 86' | | Allison 42'; McCulloch 47' | Attendance: 4,500; Referee: H Phillips |

| 14 November 1959 Division 2 | Falkirk | 0–0 | Dumbarton | Brockville Park |
| | | | | Attendance: 5,000; Referee: J Mackie |

| 21 November 1959 Division 2 | Dumbarton | 0–1 | Montrose | Boghead Park |
| | | | Kemp 40' | Attendance: 3,000; Referee: W Harvie |

| 28 November 1959 Division 2 | Albion Rovers | 0–0 | Dumbarton | Cliftonhill Stadium |
| | | | | Attendance: 900; Referee: W Beattie |

| 5 December 1959 Division 2 | Dumbarton | 4–2 | East Stirling | Boghead Park |
| | Gallacher 5', 78'; Clydesdale 26'; Fagan 85' | | Bolton 23', 80' | Attendance: 1,500; Referee: J Blair |

| 12 December 1959 Division 2 | Dumbarton | 6–0 | Cowdenbeath | Boghead Park |
| | Duchart 25' (pen.); Whalen 26'; Gallacher 34', 63'; Clydesdale 58', 66' | | | Attendance: 2,000; Referee: F Crossley |

| 19 December 1959 Division 2 | Hamilton | 5–0 | Dumbarton | Douglas Park |
| | Imrie 20', 49'; McLean 22', 44', 75' | | | Attendance: 4,000; Referee: D Minto |

| 26 December 1959 Division 2 | Dumbarton | 4–1 | Stranraer | Boghead Park |
| | Gallacher 9'; Whalen 24', 40'; Duchart 65' | | Stark 20' | Attendance: 1,000; Referee: J Mowat |

| 1 January 1960 Division 2 | Queens Park | 2–3 | Dumbarton | Hampden Park |
| | Hopper 13'; Church 61' | | Whalen 37'; Clydssdale 39', 87' | Referee: J Bissett |

| 2 January 1960 Division 2 | Dumbarton | 1–0 | St Johnstone | Boghead Park |
| | Gallacher 10' | | | Attendance: 5,000; Referee: W Syme |

| 9 January 1960 Division 2 | Berwick Rangers | 0–0 | Dumbarton | Shielfield Park |
| | | | | Attendance: 1,731; Referee: D Weir |

| 16 January 1960 Division 2 | Dumbarton | 2–0 | Brechin City | Boghead Park |
| | Gallacher 60'; Whalen 65' | | | Attendance: 3,250; Referee: J Mackie |

| 23 January 1960 Division 2 | Stenhousemuir | 1–2 | Dumbarton | Ochilview Park |
| | Munn | | Gallacher 30' | Referee: R Davidson |

| 13 February 1960 Division 2 | Dumbarton | 1–1 | Morton | Boghead Park |
| | Gallacher 80' | | Murney 30' (pen.) | Attendance: 1,800; Referee: G Bowman |

| 27 February 1960 Division 2 | Forfar Athletic | 1–0 | Dumbarton | Station Park, Forfar |
| | Cummings 65' | | | Attendance: 1,100; Referee: J Barclay |

| 12 March 1960 Division 2 | Dumbarton | 6–0 | Albion Rovers | Boghead Park |
| | Duchart 40', 64', 75' (pen.); Craig 58'; Gallacher 77'; Whalen 88' | | | Attendance: 900; Referee: J Stewart |

| 19 March 1960 Division 2 | Dumbarton | 1–0 | Falkirk | Boghead Park |
| | Duchart 50' | | | Attendance: 2,000; Referee: J Mowat |

| 26 March 1960 Division 2 | Montrose | 1–2 | Dumbarton | Links Park |
| | Jardine (o.g.) | | Nicoll 3' (o.g.); Gallacher 51' | Attendance: 1,200; Referee: W Massie |

| 6 April 1960 Division 2 | Queen of the South | 1–0 | Dumbarton | Palmerston Park |
| | Dunlop 72' | | | Attendance: 5,000; Referee: D Minto |

| 13 April 1960 Division 2 | Dumbarton | 4–2 | East Fife | Boghead Park |
| | Craig 6'; McCulloch 41'; Gallacher 46'; Duchart 57' | | McPhee 30'; Guthrie 77' | Attendance: 400 |

| 16 April 1960 Division 2 | East Stirling | 2–2 | Dumbarton | Firs Park |
| | Keenan (pen.); Crawford 75' | | Gallacher 23'; Duchart | Referee: W Syme |

| 23 April 1960 Division 2 | Cowdenbeath | 0–4 | Dumbarton | Central Park, Cowdenbeath |
| | | | Gallacher 20'; McGinlay; Black | Referee: J Stewart |

| 30 April 1960 Division 2 | Dumbarton | 2–1 | Hamilton | Boghead Park |
| | Duchart 38'; Whalen 50' | | McPike 73' | Attendance: 3,500; Referee: R Minto |

== Scottish League Cup ==
With only a single win and a draw from their 6 qualifying games, Dumbarton again failed to progress to the knock out stages of the League Cup.

| 8 August 1959 Group 6 | Arbroath | 2–0 | Dumbarton | Gayfield Park |
| | Quinn 76'; Shirriffs 88' | | | Attendance: 5,600; Referee: A Crossman |

| 12 August 1959 Group 6 | Dumbarton | 3–3 | Albion Rovers | Boghead Park |
| | Duchart 4'; Gallacher 18' mcCulloch 23' (pen.) | | Campbell 6', 25', 80' | Referee: J Stewart |

| 15 August 1959 Group 6 | Stenhousemuir | 0–2 | Dumbarton | Ochilview Park |
| | | | Prentice 30'; Stewart | Attendance: 2,000; Referee: J Blair |

| 22 August 1959 Group 6 | Dumbarton | 3–4 | Arbroath | Boghead Park |
| | Gallacher 22'; Stewart 31'; Prentice 40' | | Quinn 17'; Logie 80'; Glidden 83' (o.g.); Easson 86' | Attendance: 6,000; Referee: M Cowan |

| 26 August 1959 Group 6 | Albion Rovers | 1–0 | Dumbarton | Cliftonhill Stadium |
| | Campbell 35' |

| 29 August 1959 Group 6 | Dumbarton | 1–2 | Stenhousemuir | Boghead Park |
| | McDade 30' | | Campbell; Munn | Attendance: 3,200; Referee: P Fitzpatrick |

== Scottish Cup ==
Dumbarton were to fall at the first hurdle in the national cup, losing to Queen of the South.

| 30 January 1960 Cup round 1 | Queen of the South | 2–1 | Dumbarton | Palmerston Park |
| | Dunlop 3', 88' | | Duchart 59' | Attendance: 3,442; Referee: T Wharton |

== Stirlingshire Cup ==
In the county cup, Dumbarton lost out to Falkirk in the semi-final, after a drawn game.

| 28 October 1959 First Round | Dumbarton | 3–1 | East Stirling | Boghead Park |
| | Allison 17', 44'; Duchart 43' | | Boyd 5' | Referee: G Bowman |

| 18 April 1960 Semi-final | Falkirk | 0–0 | Dumbarton | Brockville Park |

| 26 April 1960 Semi-final replay | Dumbarton | 0–2 | Falkirk | Boghead Park |
| | | | Mackay | Referee: T Wharton |

== Friendlies ==
A number of friendlies were played during the season, including home and away fixtures against English Midland League opponents, North Shields, and a benefit match against Clyde for long serving player, Hughie Gallacher.

| 21 October 1959 Friendly | Dumbarton | 5–3 | Partick Thistle | Boghead Park |
| | Gallacher 13'; Black 18'; Allison 47'; Prentice (pen.) | | Goldie; Donvevy (pen.); Wright | Attendance: 1,300; Referee: A McLintock |

| 31 October 1959 Friendly | (England) North Shields | 2–2 | Dumbarton | Appleby Park, North Shields |
| | Dixon 43'; Johnston 75' | | McCulloch 38'; Gallacher 60' |

| 4 November 1959 Benefit | Dumbarton | 1–1 | Clyde | Boghead Park |
| | McCulloch 77' | | Herd 35' | Referee: G Bowman |

| 23 November 1959 Friendly | Dumbarton | 1–3 | Celtic XI | Boghead Park |
| | Duchart 79' | | Carroll 16'; Conway 37'; Colrain 61' | Referee: M Carroll |

| 2 December 1959 Friendly | Dumbarton | 3–4 | Scottish Command XI (Army) | Boghead Park |
| | Duchart 28', 70'; Trialist | | Scott 80', 87', 90'; Rice 88' | Referee: W Brittle |

| 5 March 1960 Friendly | Dumbarton | 2–2 | (England) North Shields | Boghead Park |
| | Whalen 67'; Clydesdale 79' | | Watson 55', 68' | Attendance: 800; Referee: J Blair |

== Player statistics ==
=== Squad ===
| No. | Pos | Nat | Player | Total | | Second Division | | Scottish Cup | | League Cup | |
| No. | Pos | Nat | Player | Apps | Goals | Apps | Goals | Apps | Goals | Apps | Goals |
|---|---|---|---|---|---|---|---|---|---|---|---|
| | GK | (Scotland) SCO | Donald Hamilton | 1 | 0 | 1 | 0 | 0 | 0 | 0 | 0 |
| | GK | (Scotland) SCO | Doug Robertson | 37 | 0 | 30 | 0 | 1 | 0 | 6 | 0 |
| | GK | (Scotland) SCO | James Woodburn | 3 | 0 | 3 | 0 | 0 | 0 | 0 | 0 |
| | DF | (Scotland) SCO | George Boyle | 6 | 0 | 5 | 0 | 0 | 0 | 1 | 0 |
| | DF | (Scotland) SCO | Tommy Govan | 27 | 0 | 25 | 0 | 1 | 0 | 1 | 0 |
| | DF | (Scotland) SCO | Andy Jardine | 36 | 0 | 30 | 0 | 1 | 0 | 5 | 0 |
| | DF | (Scotland) SCO | Jack McDade | 13 | 1 | 8 | 0 | 0 | 0 | 5 | 1 |
| | DF | (Scotland) SCO | Jim McGrogan | 1 | 0 | 1 | 0 | 0 | 0 | 0 | 0 |
| | MF | (Scotland) SCO | Gordon Black | 18 | 1 | 18 | 1 | 0 | 0 | 0 | 0 |
| | MF | (Scotland) SCO | Tommy Craig | 30 | 2 | 26 | 2 | 0 | 0 | 4 | 0 |
| | MF | (Scotland) SCO | Charlie Cunningham | 6 | 1 | 3 | 1 | 0 | 0 | 3 | 0 |
| | MF | (Scotland) SCO | Dougan | 1 | 0 | 1 | 0 | 0 | 0 | 0 | 0 |
| | MF | (Scotland) SCO | David Fagan | 17 | 1 | 16 | 1 | 1 | 0 | 0 | 0 |
| | MF | (Scotland) SCO | Freddie Glidden | 40 | 0 | 33 | 0 | 1 | 0 | 6 | 0 |
| | MF | (Scotland) SCO | Jim McCormack | 8 | 0 | 5 | 0 | 0 | 0 | 3 | 0 |
| | MF | (Scotland) SCO | John Prentice | 13 | 3 | 9 | 1 | 0 | 0 | 4 | 2 |
| | MF | (Scotland) SCO | Willie Robinson | 1 | 0 | 1 | 0 | 0 | 0 | 0 | 0 |
| | FW | (Scotland) SCO | Kenny Allison | 19 | 4 | 14 | 4 | 0 | 0 | 5 | 0 |
| | FW | (Scotland) SCO | Jimmy Anderson | 8 | 3 | 8 | 3 | 0 | 0 | 0 | 0 |
| | FW | (Scotland) SCO | Les Brown | 1 | 0 | 0 | 0 | 0 | 0 | 1 | 0 |
| | FW | (Scotland) SCO | John Christie | 22 | 0 | 19 | 0 | 1 | 0 | 2 | 0 |
| | FW | (Scotland) SCO | Gordon Clydesdale | 7 | 5 | 6 | 5 | 1 | 0 | 0 | 0 |
| | FW | (Scotland) SCO | Bobby Combe | 2 | 0 | 2 | 0 | 0 | 0 | 0 | 0 |
| | FW | (Scotland) SCO | Bobby Crum | 2 | 0 | 2 | 0 | 0 | 0 | 0 | 0 |
| | FW | (Scotland) SCO | Alex Duchart | 43 | 15 | 36 | 14 | 1 | 0 | 6 | 1 |
| | FW | (Scotland) SCO | Hugh Gallacher | 38 | 25 | 31 | 23 | 1 | 0 | 6 | 2 |
| | FW | (Scotland) SCO | Willie McCulloch | 31 | 5 | 26 | 4 | 1 | 0 | 4 | 1 |
| | FW | (Scotland) SCO | Finlay McDonald | 1 | 0 | 1 | 0 | 0 | 0 | 0 | 0 |
| | FW | (Scotland) SCO | Gerry McGinlay | 2 | 1 | 2 | 1 | 0 | 0 | 0 | 0 |
| | FW | (Scotland) SCO | John Rowley | 2 | 0 | 2 | 0 | 0 | 0 | 0 | 0 |
| | FW | (Scotland) SCO | Charlie Stewart | 10 | 2 | 6 | 0 | 0 | 0 | 4 | 2 |
| | FW | (Scotland) SCO | Murdo Tait | 2 | 0 | 2 | 0 | 0 | 0 | 0 | 0 |
| | FW | (Scotland) SCO | Tom Whalen | 21 | 7 | 20 | 7 | 1 | 0 | 0 | 0 |
| | FW | (Scotland) SCO | Trialist | 3 | 0 | 3 | 0 | 0 | 0 | 0 | 0 |

=== International Caps ===
Willie McCulloch earned his first and second caps playing for Scotland Amateurs against England on 26 March and Northern Ireland on 25 April respectively.

=== Transfers ===
Amongst those players joining and leaving the club were the following:

==== Players in ====
| Player | From | Date |
|---|---|---|
| (Scotland) Kenny Allison | (Scotland) Hibernian | 9 May 1959 |
| (Scotland) John Christie | (Scotland) Hibernian | 9 May 1959 |
| (Scotland) Alex Duchart | (Scotland) East Fife | 27 Jun 1959 |
| (Scotland) Freddie Glidden | (Scotland) Hearts | 4 Jul 1959 |
| (Scotland) Willie McCulloch | (Scotland) Drumchapel Am | 1 Aug 1959 |
| (Scotland) John Prentice | (Scotland) Falkirk | 8 Aug 1959 |
| (Scotland) Gordon Black | (Scotland) St Johnstone | 3 Oct 1959 |
| (Scotland) David Fagan | (Scotland) St Mirren | 12 Dec 1959 |

==== Players out ====
| Player | To | Date |
|---|---|---|
| (Scotland) Les Brown | (England) Chelmsford City | 30 May 1959 |
| (Scotland) Kenny Allison | (Scotland) Cowdenbeath | 9 Jan 1960 |
| (Scotland) John Prentice | (Scotland) Falkirk | 6 Feb 1960 |
| (Scotland) Tommy Brown | (Scotland) Freed | 30 Apr 1960 |
| (Scotland) John Christie | (Scotland) Freed | 30 Apr 1960 |
| (Scotland) Willie McCulloch | (Scotland) Freed | 30 Apr 1960 |
| (Scotland) Bobby McInnes | (Scotland) Freed | 30 Apr 1960 |

== Reserve team ==
Dumbarton played only one competitive 'reserve' match in the Scottish Second XI Cup, losing to Clyde in the second round.
