= John McCall =

John McCall may refer to:

- John E. McCall (1859–1920), U.S. Representative from Tennessee
- John T. McCall (1863–1950), member of the New York State Senate
- John McCall (Australian politician) (1860–1919), member of the Tasmanian House of Assembly
- John McCall (1950s footballer), Scottish footballer
- John McCall (footballer, born 1877) (1877–1951), Scottish footballer
