= Jackie Webb =

Jackie Webb may refer to:

- Jackie Webb (Footballers' Wives), a character on Footballers' Wives
- Jackie Webb (footballer) (born 1943), Scottish footballer
