= Murney =

Murney is a surname. Notable people with the surname include:

- Christopher Murney (born 1943), American actor and vocal artist
- Dylan Murnane (born 1995), Australian footballer
- Edmund Murney (1812–1861) was a lawyer and political figure in Upper Canada
- Hugh Murney (born 1939), Scottish footballer
- Paige Murney (born 1995), British amateur boxer
