= Neeson =

Neeson may refer to:

- Brian Neeson, New Zealand politician
- Cormac Neeson, lead singer of the Northern Irish hard rock band The Answer.
- Doc Neeson, Australian rock singer
- Jackie Neeson, Scottish footballer
- Liam Neeson, Irish actor
- Norm Neeson, Australian rules footballer
- Patrick Neeson Lynch, Irish Roman Catholic bishop
- Rachel Neeson, Australian architect and lecturer in architecture
- Scott Neeson, Scottish-Australian film executive and philanthropist
- Seán Neeson, Northern Irish politician
