= Berwick Rangers F.C. 1–0 Rangers F.C. =

Berwick Rangers 1–0 Rangers
- Event: 1966–67 Scottish Cup
Berwick Rangers	Rangers
1	0
- Date: 28 January 1967
- Venue: Shielfield Park, Berwick upon Tweed
- Referee: Eddie Thomson, (Edinburgh)
- Attendance: 13,365

The first round Scottish Cup match between Berwick Rangers and Rangers was a football match played on 28 January 1967. Berwick Rangers ran out 1–0 winners. The match has been described as one of the biggest upsets in Scottish football.

== Background ==
Rangers were one of the most successful teams in Scotland, having won the Scottish League several times and the Scottish Cup nineteen times. Berwick Rangers were relative newcomers to the Scottish Football League, having only joined in 1955. In May 1964, Rangers had tried to force league reconstruction, which would have meant Berwick Rangers and four other teams being expelled from the league. The five teams went to court to fight this proposal, but the court found in Rangers favour of league reconstruction. The teams appealed to the Inner House of the Court of Session and with support from Celtic's chairman Robert Kelly, this proposal was eventually dropped. Berwick Rangers had met Rangers three times previously and had lost each time, 4–0 in the Scottish Cup at Ibrox in 1953, 3–1 in the Scottish Cup at Shielfield in 1960 and 3–1 in the semi-final of the 1963–64 Scottish League Cup at Hampden Park in October 1963.

In the 1966–67 Scottish Cup competition, Rangers, the cup holders, were given a bye to the first round and drawn against Berwick Rangers, which was due to be played on 28 January 1967. Berwick Rangers had already played in two earlier preliminary rounds. In the first preliminary round they had beaten Vale of Leithen 8–1 on 17 December 1966 at Victoria Park, a club record cup win and a record away win. In the second preliminary round they had beaten Forfar Athletic 2–0 on 7 January 1967 at home. Despite their convincing victories in the preliminary rounds Berwick were given little or no chance of beating Rangers. The Glasgow Herald said on the day of the match, "Anything other than a comfortable Rangers victory must be deemed a surprise". The Rangers team featured nine players with international caps while Berwick Rangers were composed of part timers. At the time of the match, Rangers were in second place in the Scottish League Division One and Berwick Rangers were tenth in Scottish League Division Two.

== Match details ==
13,365 packed into Shielfield Park that Saturday, a record attendance at the ground. From kick off, Rangers immediately went on the attack, forcing three corners in the opening five minutes. Alex Smith, Willie Henderson and Willie Johnston all went close for Rangers. Henderson went down in the box under a challenge from Jim Kilgannon but his call for a penalty was dismissed. Rangers continued to press and Doug Coutts's intervention prevented Alex Smith from a near-certain scoring opportunity. By the half-hour mark, Rangers had forced ten corners. However, in the 32nd minute, Kenny Dowds and George Christie carved open the Rangers defence, Christie passed to Sammy Reid who blasted it past Gers keeper Norrie Martin, in off the post. Two minutes later, Christie had a golden chance to make it 2–0 but his half-hit shot was comfortably saved by Martin. Apart from a shot from John Greig which went narrowly wide, Berwick comfortably saw out the first half.

In the second half, Berwick continued to trouble Rangers with a number of chances. In the 65th minute following a collision with Jock Wallace, Willie Johnston was stretchered off with a broken leg. Johnston was substituted in the 66th minute by Davie Wilson, who had scored three goals against Berwick Rangers when they met in 1960. Despite frantic attempts from Wilson, John Greig and George McLean, they were unable to penetrate the Berwick goal. It was not all one-way traffic however — Berwick's Alan Ainslie forced Martin into a fine save and also hit the post. Legend has it that in the 94th minute, Greig had asked referee Eddie Thomson for another couple of minutes but was told "I've already given you four". Wallace played the entire second half in goal despite losing a contact lens in the mud and claimed that they should have won 3–0 as "we missed far easier chances than the one Sammy Reid scored from".

At the final whistle, Greig sportingly shook the hand of every Berwick player as they left the field.

== Aftermath ==
The defeat of Rangers sent shock waves around Scottish football; it was the first time they had been knocked out in the first round since they lost to Queen of the South by the same score almost exactly thirty years earlier on 30 January 1937. It was the first time they had lost to a Second Division club. Rangers' captain John Greig described the result as "probably the worst result in the history of our club", while The Scotsman described it as "the most ludicrous, the weirdest, the most astonishing result ever returned in Scottish football". Despite being prolific strikers for Rangers, Jim Forrest and George McLean were made scapegoats for the defeat and never played for Rangers again and within weeks were transferred to Preston North End and Dundee respectively.

The loss of McLean and Forrest allowed two notable players their chance with Rangers; Sandy Jardine was immediately drafted from the reserves to the first team (and went on to play 674 games for Rangers over the next fifteen years) and Symon paid a then record fee between two Scottish clubs of £65,000 to sign the striker Alex Ferguson from Dunfermline Athletic that summer.

In a bizarre coda to the game, later that night, Berwick's chairman Dr James Sadler and his wife were injured following a car crash with a car driven by a Rangers supporter.

Goal hero Sammy Reid had to go back to his job as a gear cutter in an engineering yard on the Sunday after the game to make up the time he had been given off earlier in the week for training.

Rangers early exit from the Scottish Cup is said to have made Celtic's treble win that year easier, and even sown the seeds of Celtic's dominance of Scottish football in the late 1960s and early 1970s.

Berwick were drawn against Hibernian in the second round away at Easter Road, Edinburgh on 18 February 1967, but lost 1–0 in front of a crowd of nearly 31,000, though Berwick had a goal by Ken Dowd disallowed in the first half and Jock Wallace saved a penalty.

Rangers eventually went on to reach the final of the European Cup Winners' Cup that season but lost 1–0 to German side Bayern Munich. Forrest and McLean had not been replaced and defender Roger Hynd played up front in that game. Rangers player Dave Smith later argued that the knee jerk reaction of dropping Forrest and McLean probably cost them the European Cup Winners' Cup.

Two years later, Berwick manager Jock Wallace left to become coach at Hearts and subsequently went on to coach at Rangers, eventually becoming their manager in 1972. Dave Smith, one of the Rangers players that day, subsequently managed Berwick between 1976 and 1980 leading them to their first League championship in 1979. Exactly eleven years later, the teams met again at Shielfield in the 1977–78 Scottish Cup with Smith and Wallace on opposite teams from 1967, this time the result went to form with Rangers winning 4–2.

== Teams ==
28 January 1967

Berwick Rangers	1 – 0	Rangers
Reid 32'

Shielfield Park, Berwick upon Tweed
Attendance: 13,365
Referee: Eddie Thomson (Edinburgh)

BERWICK RANGERS: (Note: Players positions taken from here.)
GK	(Scotland) Jock Wallace
FB	(Scotland) Gordon Haig
WH	(Scotland) Jim Kilgannon
FB	(Scotland) Ian Riddell
CD	(Scotland) Russell Craig
CH	(Scotland) Doug Coutts
IF	(Scotland) Tommy Lumsden
IF	(Scotland) Sammy Reid
CF	(Scotland) George Christie
W	(Scotland) Kenny Dowds
W	(England) Alan Ainslie
Substitutes:
M	(Scotland) Andy Rogers
Manager:
(Scotland) Jock Wallace

RANGERS:
GK	(Scotland) Norrie Martin
FB	(Denmark) Kai Johansen
DF	(Scotland) Dave Provan
DF	(Scotland) John Greig
DF	(Scotland) Ronnie McKinnon
LM	(Scotland) Dave Smith
W	(Scotland) Willie Henderson
IF	(Scotland) Alex Smith
OL	(Scotland) Willie Johnston	(substituted off) 66'
FW	(Scotland) Jim Forrest
CF	(Scotland) George McLean
Substitutes:
LW	(Scotland) Davie Wilson	(substituted on) 66'
Manager:
(Scotland) Scot Symon

== See also ==
- 1966–67 in Scottish football
