= Tommy McKenzie =

Scottish footballer

Personal information
- Full name: Thomas McKenzie
- Date of birth: 1906
- Place of birth: Wishaw, Scotland
- Date of death: 1990 (aged 83–84)
- Place of death: Motherwell, Scotland
- Height: 5 ft 8 in (1.73 m)
- Position: Wing-half

Senior career*
Years	Team	Apps	(Gls)
–	Cambuslang Rangers		
1931–1942	Motherwell	144	(2)

International career
1934–1937	Scottish League XI	2	(0)
- * Club domestic league appearances and goals

Thomas McKenzie (1906 – 1990) was a Scottish professional footballer who played as a right or left half, featuring solely at senior level for Motherwell. In his first season with the club, 1931–32, they were Scottish league champions, but McKenzie was a reserve and only made one appearance. His importance grew from then on, and he played in two of the club's Scottish Cup finals in the era, both of which were lost (1933 to Celtic, 1939 to Clyde).

He played twice for the Scottish Football League XI, and was selected for a Scottish Football Association tour of North America in 1939, but never received a full cap for Scotland.

After his playing career ended, he was employed as a coach at Motherwell for several years, as was his younger brother Willie. Their nephews Billy and Sammy Reid were both footballers who also played for Motherwell.
