= 1960–61 Scottish Football League =

Scottish football season

Statistics of the Scottish Football League in season 1960–61.

== Scottish League Division One ==
| Pos | Team | Pld | W | D | L | GF | GA | GR | Pts | Qualification or relegation |
|---|---|---|---|---|---|---|---|---|---|---|
| 1 | Rangers (C) | 34 | 23 | 5 | 6 | 88 | 46 | 1.913 | 51 | Qualified for the European Cup |
| 2 | Kilmarnock | 34 | 21 | 8 | 5 | 77 | 45 | 1.711 | 50 | |
| 3 | Third Lanark | 34 | 20 | 2 | 12 | 100 | 80 | 1.250 | 42 | |
| 4 | Celtic | 34 | 15 | 9 | 10 | 64 | 46 | 1.391 | 39 | |
| 5 | Motherwell | 34 | 15 | 8 | 11 | 70 | 57 | 1.228 | 38 | |
| 6 | Aberdeen | 34 | 14 | 8 | 12 | 72 | 72 | 1.000 | 36 | |
| 7 | Hearts | 34 | 13 | 8 | 13 | 51 | 53 | 0.962 | 34 | Invited for the Inter-Cities Fairs Cup |
| 8 | Hibernian | 34 | 15 | 4 | 15 | 66 | 69 | 0.957 | 34 | Invited for the Inter-Cities Fairs Cup |
| 9 | Dundee United | 34 | 13 | 7 | 14 | 60 | 58 | 1.034 | 33 | |
| 10 | Dundee | 34 | 13 | 6 | 15 | 61 | 53 | 1.151 | 32 | |
| 11 | Partick Thistle | 34 | 13 | 6 | 15 | 59 | 69 | 0.855 | 32 | |
| 12 | Dunfermline Athletic | 34 | 12 | 7 | 15 | 65 | 81 | 0.802 | 31 | Qualified for the Cup Winners' Cup |
| 13 | Airdrieonians | 34 | 10 | 10 | 14 | 61 | 71 | 0.859 | 30 | |
| 14 | St Mirren | 34 | 11 | 7 | 16 | 53 | 58 | 0.914 | 29 | |
| 15 | St Johnstone | 34 | 10 | 9 | 15 | 47 | 63 | 0.746 | 29 | |
| 16 | Raith Rovers | 34 | 10 | 7 | 17 | 46 | 67 | 0.687 | 27 | |
| 17 | Clyde (R) | 34 | 6 | 11 | 17 | 55 | 77 | 0.714 | 23 | Relegated to the Second Division |
| 18 | Ayr United (R) | 34 | 5 | 12 | 17 | 51 | 81 | 0.630 | 22 | Relegated to the Second Division |

Source: RSSSF
(C) Champions; (R) Relegated

== Scottish League Division Two ==
| Pos | Team | Pld | W | D | L | GF | GA | GD | Pts | Promotion or relegation |
|---|---|---|---|---|---|---|---|---|---|---|
| 1 | Stirling Albion | 36 | 24 | 7 | 5 | 89 | 37 | +52 | 55 | Promotion to the 1961–62 First Division |
| 2 | Falkirk | 36 | 24 | 6 | 6 | 100 | 40 | +60 | 54 | Promotion to the 1961–62 First Division |
| 3 | Stenhousemuir | 36 | 24 | 2 | 10 | 99 | 69 | +30 | 50 | |
| 4 | Stranraer | 36 | 19 | 6 | 11 | 83 | 55 | +28 | 44 | |
| 5 | Queen of the South | 36 | 20 | 3 | 13 | 77 | 52 | +25 | 43 | |
| 6 | Hamilton Academical | 36 | 17 | 7 | 12 | 84 | 80 | +4 | 41 | |
| 7 | Montrose | 36 | 19 | 2 | 15 | 75 | 65 | +10 | 40 | |
| 8 | Cowdenbeath | 36 | 17 | 6 | 13 | 71 | 65 | +6 | 40 | |
| 9 | Berwick Rangers | 36 | 14 | 9 | 13 | 62 | 69 | −7 | 37 | |
| 10 | Dumbarton | 36 | 15 | 5 | 16 | 78 | 82 | −4 | 35 | |
| 11 | Alloa Athletic | 36 | 13 | 7 | 16 | 78 | 68 | +10 | 33 | |
| 12 | Arbroath | 36 | 13 | 7 | 16 | 56 | 76 | −20 | 33 | |
| 13 | East Fife | 36 | 14 | 4 | 18 | 70 | 80 | −10 | 32 | |
| 14 | Brechin City | 36 | 9 | 9 | 18 | 60 | 78 | −18 | 27 | |
| 15 | Queen's Park | 36 | 10 | 6 | 20 | 61 | 87 | −26 | 26 | |
| 16 | East Stirlingshire | 36 | 9 | 7 | 20 | 59 | 100 | −41 | 25 | |
| 17 | Albion Rovers | 36 | 9 | 6 | 21 | 60 | 89 | −29 | 24 | |
| 18 | Forfar Athletic | 36 | 10 | 4 | 22 | 65 | 98 | −33 | 24 | |
| 19 | Morton | 36 | 5 | 11 | 20 | 56 | 93 | −37 | 21 | |

Source: "1960-1961 Second Division - SPFL Archive". SPFL.
