= Sammy Reid =

Scottish footballer

Personal information
- Full name: Samuel McKnight Reid
- Date of birth: 13 October 1939
- Place of birth: Craigneuk, Scotland
- Date of death: 9 November 2014 (aged 75)
- Place of death: Wishaw, Scotland
- Height: 5 ft 4 in (1.63 m)
- Position: Inside forward

Senior career*
| Years | Team | Apps | (Gls) |
| 1956–1960 | Motherwell | 60 | (19) |
| 1956–1957 | → Douglas Water Thistle (loan) | | |
| 1960 | Liverpool | 0 | (0) |
| 1960–1963 | Falkirk | 70 | (25) |
| 1963–1966 | Clyde | 57 | (10) |
| 1966–1967 | Berwick Rangers | 21 | (8) |
| 1967–1968 | Dumbarton | 14 | (2) |
| Total | | 222 | (64) |
- * Club domestic league appearances and goals

Samuel McKnight Reid (13 October 1939 – 9 November 2014) was a Scottish footballer who played as an inside forward. He scored the winning goal for Berwick Rangers in their 1966–67 Scottish Cup victory against Rangers, in what is rated as one of the greatest shocks in the history of Scottish football.

Reid also played for Motherwell, Falkirk, Clyde, and Dumbarton. He was Bill Shankly's first signing as Liverpool manager, but never played a first-team game for the Anfield club.

His elder brother, Billy, and maternal uncle, Tommy McKenzie, were both footballers who also played for Motherwell.
