= 1958–59 Scottish Division Two =

Scottish Second Division
- Season: 1958–59
- Champions: Ayr United
- Promoted: Ayr United; Arbroath

The 1958–59 Scottish Second Division was won by Ayr United who, along with second placed Arbroath, were promoted to the First Division. Montrose finished bottom.

== Table ==
Pos	Team	Pld	W	D	L	GF	GA	GD	Pts	Promotion or relegation
1	Ayr United	36	28	4	4	115	48	+67	60	Promotion to the 1959–60 First Division
2	Arbroath	36	23	5	8	86	59	+27	51	Promotion to the 1959–60 First Division
3	Stenhousemuir	36	20	6	10	87	68	+19	46	
4	Dumbarton	36	19	7	10	94	61	+33	45	
5	Brechin City	36	16	10	10	79	65	+14	42	
6	St Johnstone	36	15	10	11	54	44	+10	40	
7	Hamilton Academical	36	15	8	13	76	62	+14	38	
8	East Fife	36	15	8	13	83	81	+2	38	
9	Berwick Rangers	36	16	6	14	63	66	−3	38	
10	Albion Rovers	36	14	7	15	84	79	+5	35	
11	Morton	36	13	8	15	68	85	−17	34	
12	Forfar Athletic	36	12	9	15	73	87	−14	33	
13	Alloa Athletic	36	12	7	17	76	81	−5	31	
14	Cowdenbeath	36	13	5	18	67	79	−12	31	
15	East Stirlingshire	36	10	8	18	50	79	−29	28	
16	Stranraer	36	8	11	17	63	76	−13	27	
17	Dundee United	36	9	7	20	62	86	−24	25	
18	Queen's Park	36	9	6	21	53	80	−27	24	
19	Montrose	36	6	6	24	49	96	−47	18	

Source: "1958-1959 Second Division - SPFL Archive". SPFL.
