= 1960–61 Scottish Division Two =

Scottish Second Division
- Season: 1960–61
- Champions: Stirling Albion
- Promoted: Stirling Albion; Falkirk

The 1960–61 Scottish Second Division was won by Stirling Albion who, along with second placed Falkirk, were promoted to the First Division. Morton finished bottom.

== Table ==
Pos	Team	Pld	W	D	L	GF	GA	GD	Pts	Promotion or relegation
1	Stirling Albion	36	24	7	5	89	37	+52	55	Promotion to the 1961–62 First Division
2	Falkirk	36	24	6	6	100	40	+60	54	Promotion to the 1961–62 First Division
3	Stenhousemuir	36	24	2	10	99	69	+30	50	
4	Stranraer	36	19	6	11	83	55	+28	44	
5	Queen of the South	36	20	3	13	77	52	+25	43	
6	Hamilton Academical	36	17	7	12	84	80	+4	41	
7	Montrose	36	19	2	15	75	65	+10	40	
8	Cowdenbeath	36	17	6	13	71	65	+6	40	
9	Berwick Rangers	36	14	9	13	62	69	−7	37	
10	Dumbarton	36	15	5	16	78	82	−4	35	
11	Alloa Athletic	36	13	7	16	78	68	+10	33	
12	Arbroath	36	13	7	16	56	76	−20	33	
13	East Fife	36	14	4	18	70	80	−10	32	
14	Brechin City	36	9	9	18	60	78	−18	27	
15	Queen's Park	36	10	6	20	61	87	−26	26	
16	East Stirlingshire	36	9	7	20	59	100	−41	25	
17	Albion Rovers	36	9	6	21	60	89	−29	24	
18	Forfar Athletic	36	10	4	22	65	98	−33	24	
19	Morton	36	5	11	20	56	93	−37	21	

Source: "1960-1961 Second Division - SPFL Archive". SPFL.
