= Ian Lochhead =

Scottish footballer

Personal information
- Full name: John Shearer Lochhead
- Date of birth: 26 September 1939
- Place of birth: Partick, Scotland
- Date of death: 3 November 2004 (aged 65)
- Place of death: Erskine, Renfrewshire, Scotland
- Position: Centre forward

Youth career
- Drumchapel Amateurs, Partick Avondale

Senior career*
Years	Team	Apps	(Gls)
1958–1960	Celtic	8	(2)
1961–1962	Dumbarton	4	(2)
- * Club domestic league appearances and goals

Ian Lochhead (born 26 September 1939) was a Scottish footballer who played for Celtic and Dumbarton.
