= 1958–59 Scottish Football League =

Scottish football season

Statistics of the Scottish Football League in season 1958–59.

== Scottish League Division One ==
Pos	Team	Pld	W	D	L	GF	GA	GR	Pts
1	Rangers	34	21	8	5	92	51	1.804	50
2	Heart of Midlothian	34	21	6	7	92	51	1.804	48
3	Motherwell	34	18	8	8	83	50	1.660	44
4	Dundee	34	16	9	9	61	51	1.196	41
5	Airdrieonians	34	15	7	12	64	62	1.032	37
6	Celtic	34	14	8	12	70	53	1.321	36
7	St Mirren	34	14	7	13	71	74	0.959	35
8	Kilmarnock	34	13	8	13	58	51	1.137	34
9	Partick Thistle	34	14	6	14	59	66	0.894	34
10	Hibernian	34	13	6	15	68	70	0.971	32
11	Third Lanark	34	11	10	13	74	83	0.892	32
12	Stirling Albion	34	11	8	15	54	64	0.844	30
13	Aberdeen	34	12	5	17	63	66	0.955	29
14	Raith Rovers	34	10	9	15	60	70	0.857	29
15	Clyde	34	12	4	18	62	66	0.939	28
16	Dunfermline Athletic	34	10	8	16	68	87	0.782	28
17	Falkirk	34	10	7	17	58	79	0.734	27
18	Queen of the South	34	6	6	22	38	101	0.376	18

Source: RSSSF

== Scottish League Division Two ==
Pos	Team	Pld	W	D	L	GF	GA	GD	Pts	Promotion or relegation
1	Ayr United	36	28	4	4	115	48	+67	60	Promotion to the 1959–60 First Division
2	Arbroath	36	23	5	8	86	59	+27	51	Promotion to the 1959–60 First Division
3	Stenhousemuir	36	20	6	10	87	68	+19	46	
4	Dumbarton	36	19	7	10	94	61	+33	45	
5	Brechin City	36	16	10	10	79	65	+14	42	
6	St Johnstone	36	15	10	11	54	44	+10	40	
7	Hamilton Academical	36	15	8	13	76	62	+14	38	
8	East Fife	36	15	8	13	83	81	+2	38	
9	Berwick Rangers	36	16	6	14	63	66	−3	38	
10	Albion Rovers	36	14	7	15	84	79	+5	35	
11	Morton	36	13	8	15	68	85	−17	34	
12	Forfar Athletic	36	12	9	15	73	87	−14	33	
13	Alloa Athletic	36	12	7	17	76	81	−5	31	
14	Cowdenbeath	36	13	5	18	67	79	−12	31	
15	East Stirlingshire	36	10	8	18	50	79	−29	28	
16	Stranraer	36	8	11	17	63	76	−13	27	
17	Dundee United	36	9	7	20	62	86	−24	25	
18	Queen's Park	36	9	6	21	53	80	−27	24	
19	Montrose	36	6	6	24	49	96	−47	18	

Source: "1958-1959 Second Division - SPFL Archive". SPFL.
