= Les Sneddon =

Scottish footballer

Les Sneddon Luke
Personal information
- Date of birth: 20 July 1941 (age 85)
- Position: Inside forward

Senior career*
Years	Team	Apps	(Gls)
1961–1962	Dumbarton (trialist)	1	(0)
1963–1965	Albion Rovers	42	(19)
1965–1970	Brechin City	156	(47)
- * Club domestic league appearances and goals

Les Sneddon (born 20 July 1941) was a Scottish footballer who played for Dumbarton, Albion Rovers and Brechin City.
