= 1957–58 Scottish Division Two =

Scottish Second Division
- Season: 1957–58
- Champions: Stirling Albion
- Promoted: Stirling Albion; Dunfermline Athletic

The 1957–58 Scottish Second Division was won by Stirling Albion who, along with second placed Dunfermline Athletic, were promoted to the First Division. Berwick Rangers finished bottom.

== Table ==
Pos	Team	Pld	W	D	L	GF	GA	GD	Pts	Promotion or relegation
1	Stirling Albion	36	25	5	6	105	48	+57	55	Promotion to the 1958–59 First Division
2	Dunfermline Athletic	36	24	5	7	120	42	+78	53	Promotion to the 1958–59 First Division
3	Arbroath	36	21	5	10	89	72	+17	47	
4	Dumbarton	36	20	4	12	92	57	+35	44	
5	Ayr United	36	18	6	12	98	81	+17	42	
6	Cowdenbeath	36	17	8	11	100	85	+15	42	
7	Brechin City	36	16	8	12	80	81	−1	40	
8	Alloa Athletic	36	15	9	12	88	78	+10	39	
9	Dundee United	36	12	9	15	81	77	+4	33	
10	Hamilton Academical	36	12	9	15	70	79	−9	33	
11	St Johnstone	36	12	9	15	67	85	−18	33	
12	Forfar Athletic	36	13	6	17	70	71	−1	32	
13	Morton	36	12	8	16	77	83	−6	32	
14	Montrose	36	13	6	17	55	72	−17	32	
15	East Stirlingshire	36	12	5	19	55	79	−24	29	
16	Stenhousemuir	36	12	5	19	68	98	−30	29	
17	Albion Rovers	36	12	5	19	53	79	−26	29	
18	Stranraer	36	9	7	20	54	83	−29	25	
19	Berwick Rangers	36	5	5	26	37	109	−72	15	

Source: "1957-1958 Second Division - SPFL Archive". SPFL.
