= George Tulloch =

Scottish footballer

Personal information
- Full name: George Burrell Tulloch
- Date of birth: 2 December 1938 (age 87)
- Position: Forward

Senior career*
Years	Team	Apps	(Gls)
1960–1961	Dumbarton	8	(6)
1960–1962	Falkirk	9	(1)
1962–1965	Arbroath	70	(19)
1965–1966	Stenhousemuir	13	(2)
1965–1966	Raith Rovers	2	(1)
1965–1966	Brechin City	42	(8)
- * Club domestic league appearances and goals

George Burrell Tulloch (born 2 December 1938) was a Scottish footballer who played for Dumbarton, Falkirk, Arbroath, Stenhousemuir, Raith Rovers and Brechin City.
