= Tommy McMillan (footballer, born 1936) =

Scottish footballer (1936–2023)

Personal information
- Full name: Thomas Pearson McMillan
- Date of birth: 16 January 1936
- Place of birth: Auchinleck, Scotland
- Date of death: 24 February 2023 (aged 87)
- Place of death: Ayrshire, Scotland
- Position: Inside forward

Youth career
- Maybole

Senior career*
Years	Team	Apps	(Gls)
1956–1958	Watford	33	(13)
1958–1961	Carlisle United	89	(7)
1961–1962	Queen of the South	5	(3)
1961–1962	Dumbarton	12	(6)
1962–1963	Stranraer	14	(7)
- * Club domestic league appearances and goals

Thomas Pearson McMillan (16 January 1936 – 24 February 2023) was a Scottish footballer who played for Watford, Carlisle United, Queen of the South, Dumbarton and Stranraer. McMillan died in Ayrshire on 24 February 2023, at the age of 87.
