= Billy Reid (footballer, born 1938) =

Scottish professional footballer (1938–2021)

Personal information
- Date of birth: 31 March 1938
- Place of birth: Motherwell, Scotland
- Date of death: 20 July 2021 (aged 83)

Youth career
- Wishaw

Senior career*
Years	Team	Apps	(Gls)
1955–1961	Motherwell	56	(8)
1961–1968	Airdrieonians	122	(6)
Total		178	(14)
- * Club domestic league appearances and goals

Billy Reid (31 March 1938 – 20 July 2021) was a Scottish professional footballer who played as a wing half for Wishaw, before signing for Motherwell on his 17th birthday where he was part of the legendary Ancell Babes team. He then moved to Airdrieonians, before joining the Broomfield club's coaching staff. He also worked for Airdrieonians as a scout. His younger brother Sammy Reid also played for Motherwell.
