= 1960–61 Scottish League Cup =

Tournament details
- Country: Scotland

Final positions
- Champions: Rangers
- Runners-up: Kilmarnock

The 1960–61 Scottish League Cup was the fifteenth season of Scotland's second football knockout competition. The competition was won Rangers, who defeated Kilmarnock in the Final.

== First round ==
=== Group 1 ===
Team	Pld	W	D	L	GF	GA	GR	Pts
Clyde	6	2	3	1	13	11	1.182	7
Heart of Midlothian	6	3	1	2	13	11	1.182	7
Motherwell	6	2	2	2	17	12	1.417	6
St Mirren	6	1	2	3	6	15	0.400	4

Home team	Score	Away team	Date
Heart of Midlothian	1–1	St Mirren	13 August 1960
Motherwell	4–4	Clyde	13 August 1960
Clyde	2–0	Heart of Midlothian	17 August 1960
St Mirren	0–4	Motherwell	17 August 1960
Clyde	4–0	St Mirren	20 August 1960
Motherwell	2–3	Heart of Midlothian	20 August 1960
Clyde	1–1	Motherwell	27 August 1960
St Mirren	3–1	Heart of Midlothian	27 August 1960
Heart of Midlothian	6–2	Clyde	31 August 1960
Motherwell	5–2	St Mirren	31 August 1960
Heart of Midlothian	2–1	Motherwell	3 September 1960
St Mirren	0–0	Clyde	3 September 1960

=== Play-off ===
Home team	Score	Away team	Date
Clyde	2–1	Heart of Midlothian	12 September 1960

=== Group 2 ===
Team	Pld	W	D	L	GF	GA	GR	Pts
Rangers	6	4	0	2	15	10	1.500	8
Celtic	6	3	1	2	11	8	1.375	7
Third Lanark	6	3	0	3	12	10	1.200	6
Partick Thistle	6	1	1	4	6	16	0.375	3

Home team	Score	Away team	Date
Celtic	2–0	Third Lanark	13 August 1960
Rangers	3–1	Partick Thistle	13 August 1960
Partick Thistle	1–1	Celtic	17 August 1960
Third Lanark	2–1	Rangers	17 August 1960
Rangers	2–3	Celtic	20 August 1960
Third Lanark	3–1	Partick Thistle	20 August 1960
Partick Thistle	1–4	Rangers	27 August 1960
Third Lanark	1–3	Celtic	27 August 1960
Celtic	1–2	Partick Thistle	31 August 1960
Rangers	3–2	Third Lanark	31 August 1960
Celtic	1–2	Rangers	3 September 1960
Partick Thistle	0–4	Third Lanark	3 September 1960

=== Group 3 ===
Team	Pld	W	D	L	GF	GA	GR	Pts
Kilmarnock	6	4	1	1	12	7	1.714	9
Dunfermline Athletic	6	3	0	3	13	12	1.083	6
Hibernian	6	2	1	3	15	13	1.154	5
Airdrieonians	6	2	0	4	10	18	0.556	4

Home team	Score	Away team	Date
Dunfermline Athletic	5–2	Airdrieonians	13 August 1960
Kilmarnock	4–2	Hibernian	13 August 1960
Airdrieonians	0–2	Kilmarnock	17 August 1960
Hibernian	3–0	Dunfermline Athletic	17 August 1960
Hibernian	6–1	Airdrieonians	20 August 1960
Kilmarnock	2–1	Dunfermline Athletic	20 August 1960
Airdrieonians	4–2	Dunfermline Athletic	27 August 1960
Hibernian	2–2	Kilmarnock	27 August 1960
Dunfermline Athletic	3–1	Hibernian	31 August 1960
Kilmarnock	2–0	Airdrieonians	31 August 1960
Airdrieonians	3–1	Hibernian	3 September 1960
Dunfermline Athletic	2–0	Kilmarnock	3 September 1960

=== Group 4 ===
Team	Pld	W	D	L	GF	GA	GR	Pts
Dundee	6	6	0	0	23	2	11.500	12
Aberdeen	6	2	1	3	10	18	0.556	5
Raith Rovers	6	2	1	3	7	14	0.500	5
Ayr United	6	0	2	4	7	13	0.538	2

Home team	Score	Away team	Date
Aberdeen	4–3	Ayr United	13 August 1960
Dundee	5–0	Raith Rovers	13 August 1960
Ayr United	1–2	Dundee	17 August 1960
Raith Rovers	4–1	Aberdeen	17 August 1960
Aberdeen	1–4	Dundee	20 August 1960
Raith Rovers	1–1	Ayr United	20 August 1960
Ayr United	1–1	Aberdeen	27 August 1960
Raith Rovers	0–3	Dundee	27 August 1960
Aberdeen	3–0	Raith Rovers	31 August 1960
Dundee	3–0	Ayr United	31 August 1960
Ayr United	1–2	Raith Rovers	3 September 1960
Dundee	6–0	Aberdeen	3 September 1960

=== Group 5 ===
Team	Pld	W	D	L	GF	GA	GR	Pts
Queen of the South	6	6	0	0	18	5	3.600	12
Montrose	6	3	0	3	11	11	1.000	6
Albion Rovers	6	3	0	3	9	13	0.692	6
Queen's Park	6	0	0	6	2	11	0.182	0

Home team	Score	Away team	Date
Albion Rovers	0–3	Queen of the South	13 August 1960
Queen's Park	0–2	Montrose	13 August 1960
Montrose	3–1	Albion Rovers	17 August 1960
Queen of the South	2–0	Queen's Park	17 August 1960
Albion Rovers	3–1	Queen's Park	20 August 1960
Queen of the South	5–2	Montrose	20 August 1960
Montrose	2–1	Queen's Park	27 August 1960
Queen of the South	5–2	Albion Rovers	27 August 1960
Albion Rovers	2–1	Montrose	31 August 1960
Queen's Park	0–1	Queen of the South	31 August 1960
Montrose	1–2	Queen of the South	3 September 1960
Queen's Park	0–1	Albion Rovers	3 September 1960

=== Group 6 ===
Team	Pld	W	D	L	GF	GA	GR	Pts
Hamilton Academical	6	5	0	1	16	7	2.286	10
St Johnstone	6	1	3	2	16	12	1.333	5
Falkirk	6	1	3	2	11	19	0.579	5
Arbroath	6	0	4	2	6	11	0.545	4

Home team	Score	Away team	Date
Falkirk	2–2	Arbroath	13 August 1960
St Johnstone	2–3	Hamilton Academical	13 August 1960
Arbroath	0–0	St Johnstone	17 August 1960
Hamilton Academical	4–1	Falkirk	17 August 1960
Arbroath	0–4	Hamilton Academical	20 August 1960
Falkirk	3–3	St Johnstone	20 August 1960
Arbroath	2–2	Falkirk	27 August 1960
Hamilton Academical	3–2	St Johnstone	27 August 1960
Falkirk	2–1	Hamilton Academical	31 August 1960
St Johnstone	2–2	Arbroath	31 August 1960
Hamilton Academical	1–0	Arbroath	3 September 1960
St Johnstone	7–1	Falkirk	3 September 1960

=== Group 7 ===
Team	Pld	W	D	L	GF	GA	GR	Pts
Dumbarton	6	3	3	0	16	7	2.286	9
Morton	6	2	2	2	12	14	0.857	6
Alloa Athletic	6	2	1	3	8	12	0.667	5
Berwick Rangers	6	1	2	3	9	12	0.750	4

Home team	Score	Away team	Date
Alloa Athletic	1–2	Morton	13 August 1960
Berwick Rangers	2–2	Dumbarton	13 August 1960
Dumbarton	0–0	Alloa Athletic	17 August 1960
Morton	2–2	Berwick Rangers	17 August 1960
Berwick Rangers	1–2	Alloa Athletic	20 August 1960
Morton	1–3	Dumbarton	20 August 1960
Dumbarton	3–0	Berwick Rangers	27 August 1960
Morton	3–2	Alloa Athletic	27 August 1960
Alloa Athletic	1–5	Dumbarton	31 August 1960
Berwick Rangers	3–1	Morton	31 August 1960
Alloa Athletic	2–1	Berwick Rangers	3 September 1960
Dumbarton	3–3	Morton	3 September 1960

=== Group 8 ===
Team	Pld	W	D	L	GF	GA	GR	Pts
Stenhousemuir	6	3	3	0	13	8	1.625	9
Stirling Albion	6	3	1	2	12	9	1.333	7
Dundee United	6	2	2	2	9	11	0.818	6
Brechin City	6	1	0	5	8	14	0.571	2

Home team	Score	Away team	Date
Brechin City	1–3	Stenhousemuir	13 August 1960
Stirling Albion	1–2	Dundee United	13 August 1960
Dundee United	2–1	Brechin City	17 August 1960
Stenhousemuir	2–0	Stirling Albion	17 August 1960
Brechin City	1–2	Stirling Albion	20 August 1960
Dundee United	3–3	Stenhousemuir	20 August 1960
Dundee United	0–3	Stirling Albion	27 August 1960
Stenhousemuir	2–1	Brechin City	27 August 1960
Brechin City	2–1	Dundee United	31 August 1960
Stirling Albion	2–2	Stenhousemuir	31 August 1960
Stenhousemuir	1–1	Dundee United	3 September 1960
Stirling Albion	4–2	Brechin City	3 September 1960

=== Group 9 ===
Team	Pld	W	D	L	GF	GA	GR	Pts
Cowdenbeath	4	3	0	1	12	6	2.000	6
Stranraer	4	2	1	1	9	9	1.000	5
Forfar Athletic	4	1	1	2	11	10	1.100	3
East Stirlingshire	4	1	1	2	7	9	0.778	3
East Fife	4	1	1	2	9	14	0.643	3

Home team	Score	Away team	Date
East Fife	2–5	Cowdenbeath	13 August 1960
Forfar Athletic	2–2	East Stirlingshire	13 August 1960
Cowdenbeath	3–1	Forfar Athletic	17 August 1960
East Stirlingshire	1–3	Stranraer	17 August 1960
Cowdenbeath	3–0	East Stirlingshire	20 August 1960
Stranraer	2–2	East Fife	20 August 1960
East Stirlingshire	4–1	East Fife	27 August 1960
Forfar Athletic	5–1	Stranraer	27 August 1960
East Fife	4–3	Forfar Athletic	3 September 1960
Stranraer	3–1	Cowdenbeath	3 September 1960

== Supplementary round ==
=== First leg ===
Home team	Score	Away team	Date
Dumbarton	3–0	Cowdenbeath	5 September 1960

=== Second leg ===
Home team	Score	Away team	Date	Agg
Cowdenbeath	2–1	Dumbarton	7 September 1960	2–4

== Quarter-finals ==
=== First leg ===
Home team	Score	Away team	Date
Clyde	1–2	Kilmarnock	14 September 1960
Hamilton Academical	4–0	Stenhousemuir	14 September 1960
Queen of the South	2–0	Dumbarton	14 September 1960
Rangers	1–0	Dundee	14 September 1960

=== Second leg ===
Home team	Score	Away team	Date	Agg
Dumbarton	2–1	Queen of the South	21 September 1960	2–3
Dundee	3–4	Rangers	21 September 1960	3–5
Kilmarnock	3–1	Clyde	21 September 1960	5–2
Stenhousemuir	5–4	Hamilton Academical	21 September 1960	5–8

== Semi-finals ==
Home team	Score	Away team	Date
Kilmarnock	5–1	Hamilton Academical	12 October 1960
Rangers	7–0	Queen of the South	19 October 1960

== Final ==
29 October 1960

Rangers	2–0	Kilmarnock
Brand; Scott

Hampden Park, Glasgow
Attendance: 82,063
