= Adam Hogg =

Scottish footballer (1934–2025)

Personal information
- Full name: Adam Hogg
- Date of birth: 26 April 1934
- Place of birth: Airdrie, Scotland
- Date of death: 6 November 2025 (aged 91)
- Place of death: Devon, England
- Position: Centre half

Youth career
- Espieside Thistle

Senior career*
Years	Team	Apps	(Gls)
1955–1956	Airdrie	0	(0)
1956–1957	Swindon	1	(0)
1957–1958	Dumbarton	6	(0)
Total		7	(0)
- * Club domestic league appearances and goals

Adam Hogg (26 April 1934 – 6 November 2025) was a Scottish footballer who played as a centre half for Airdrie, Swindon and Dumbarton. He died at his home in Devon, England, on 6 November 2025, at the age of 91.
