= 1959–60 Scottish Division Two =

Scottish Second Division
- Season: 1959–60
- Champions: St Johnstone
- Promoted: St Johnstone; Dundee United

The 1959–60 Scottish Second Division was won by St Johnstone who, along with second placed Dundee United, were promoted to the First Division. Cowdenbeath finished bottom.

== Table ==
| Pos | Team | Pld | W | D | L | GF | GA | GD | Pts | Promotion or relegation |
|---|---|---|---|---|---|---|---|---|---|---|
| 1 | St Johnstone | 36 | 24 | 5 | 7 | 87 | 47 | +40 | 53 | Promotion to the 1960–61 First Division |
| 2 | Dundee United | 36 | 22 | 6 | 8 | 90 | 45 | +45 | 50 | Promotion to the 1960–61 First Division |
| 3 | Queen of the South | 36 | 21 | 7 | 8 | 94 | 52 | +42 | 49 | |
| 4 | Hamilton Academical | 36 | 21 | 6 | 9 | 91 | 62 | +29 | 48 | |
| 5 | Stenhousemuir | 36 | 20 | 4 | 12 | 86 | 67 | +19 | 44 | |
| 6 | Dumbarton | 36 | 18 | 7 | 11 | 67 | 53 | +14 | 43 | |
| 7 | Montrose | 36 | 19 | 5 | 12 | 60 | 52 | +8 | 43 | |
| 8 | Falkirk | 36 | 15 | 9 | 12 | 77 | 43 | +34 | 39 | |
| 9 | Berwick Rangers | 36 | 16 | 5 | 15 | 62 | 55 | +7 | 37 | |
| 10 | Albion Rovers | 36 | 14 | 8 | 14 | 71 | 78 | −7 | 36 | |
| 11 | Queen's Park | 36 | 17 | 2 | 17 | 65 | 79 | −14 | 36 | |
| 12 | Brechin City | 36 | 14 | 6 | 16 | 66 | 66 | 0 | 34 | |
| 13 | Alloa Athletic | 36 | 13 | 5 | 18 | 70 | 85 | −15 | 31 | |
| 14 | Morton | 36 | 10 | 8 | 18 | 67 | 79 | −12 | 28 | |
| 15 | East Stirlingshire | 36 | 10 | 8 | 18 | 68 | 82 | −14 | 28 | |
| 16 | Forfar Athletic | 36 | 10 | 8 | 18 | 53 | 84 | −31 | 28 | |
| 17 | Stranraer | 36 | 10 | 3 | 23 | 53 | 79 | −26 | 23 | |
| 18 | East Fife | 36 | 7 | 6 | 23 | 50 | 87 | −37 | 20 | |
| 19 | Cowdenbeath | 36 | 6 | 2 | 28 | 42 | 124 | −82 | 14 | |

Source: "1959-1960 Second Division - SPFL Archive". SPFL (in Malay).
