= Bobby Paterson =

Scottish footballer

Personal information
- Full name: Robert Peacock Paterson
- Date of birth: 1 October 1927
- Place of birth: Newington, Scotland
- Date of death: 27 August 2011 (aged 83)
- Place of death: Glasgow, Scotland
- Position: Right back

Senior career*
Years	Team	Apps	(Gls)
1950–1952	Queen's Park	16	(0)
1952–1958	Aberdeen	8	(0)
1958	Dumbarton	0	(0)

International career
1952	Scotland Amateurs	3	(0)
1952	Great Britain	1	(0)
- * Club domestic league appearances and goals

Robert Peacock Paterson (1 October 1927 – 27 August 2011) was a Scottish footballer who played in the Scottish League for Queen's Park and Aberdeen as a right back. He was capped by Scotland at amateur level and made one friendly appearance for Great Britain.
