= Tommy Ferns =

Scottish footballer (born 1928)

Personal information
- Full name: Thomas Ferns
- Date of birth: 22 November 1928
- Place of birth: Glasgow, Scotland
- Position: Wing half

Youth career
- Bailieston

Senior career*
Years	Team	Apps	(Gls)
1960–1961	Dumbarton	23	(0)
- * Club domestic league appearances and goals

Thomas Ferns (born 22 November 1928) was a Scottish footballer who played for Dumbarton.
