= Ken Allison =

Scottish footballer (born 1937)

Personal information
- Full name: Kenneth Allison
- Date of birth: 6 January 1937 (age 89)
- Place of birth: Edinburgh, Scotland
- Position: Inside forward

Senior career*
Years	Team	Apps	(Gls)
19??–1958	West Calder United		
1958–1959	Hibernian	5	(4)
1959–1960	Dumbarton	14	(4)
1960–1963	Cowdenbeath	87	(37)
1963–1966	Darlington	75	(39)
1966–1967	Lincoln City	42	(12)
1967–1970	Rochester Lancers		
1970–19??	Syracuse Scorpions		
- * Club domestic league appearances and goals

Kenneth Allison (born 6 January 1937), known as Ken or Kenny Allison, is a Scottish former footballer who played in the Scottish Football League for Hibernian, Dumbarton and Cowdenbeath, in the English Football League for Darlington and Lincoln City, and in the American Soccer League for the Rochester Lancers and Syracuse Scorpions. He played as an inside forward or, in the latter part of his career, in midfield.

== Life and career ==
Allison was born in Edinburgh. He joined Hibernian from Junior club West Calder United in January 1958. He scored on his Scottish League debut that October, in a 2–1 win at home to Clyde, and produced three more goals in his and Hibernian's next four matches, but made no more appearances for them. At the end of the season, he moved down a division and signed for Dumbarton, scoring four goals in fourteen league games before moving on again in January 1960, this time to fellow Second Division club Cowdenbeath.

He moved to England in 1963 to sign for Fourth Division club Darlington, for whom he scored a goal every two games. In February 1966, Allison joined Lincoln City in part-exchange for Barry Hutchinson, in a deal estimated by the Guardian at about £5,000, as Darlington reinforced an already strong squad to ensure their first promotion for more than 40 years. Allison scored seven goals in his twelve appearances in what remained of the 1965–66 season, but was less productive the following year, and left Lincoln to play in the American Soccer League for the Rochester Lancers in 1967. He remained with the Lancers until 1970, when he joined the Syracuse Scorpions as part of the deal in which top scorer Jim Lefkos moved to Rochester.
