= John McCall (footballer, born 1877) =

Scottish footballer

Personal information
- Full name: John McCall
- Date of birth: 1877
- Place of birth: Muirkirk, Scotland
- Date of death: 1951 (aged 73–74)
- Position: Winger

Senior career*
Years	Team	Apps	(Gls)
1898–1899	Muirkirk Athletic		
1899–1900	Strathclyde		
1900–1901	Kilmarnock Deanpark		
1901–1902	Hibernian		
1902–1903	Bristol Rovers		
1903–1904	Notts County	3	(0)
1904	Arnold		
Total		3	(0)
- * Club domestic league appearances and goals

John McCall (1877–1951) was a Scottish footballer who played in the Football League for Notts County.
