= William Devlin (footballer, born 1931) =

Scottish footballer (born 1931)

Personal information
- Full name: William Devlin
- Date of birth: 30 May 1931 (age 95)
- Place of birth: Glasgow, Scotland
- Position: Outside left

Youth career
- Blantyre

Senior career*
Years	Team	Apps	(Gls)
1954–1955	Peterborough United		
1956–1957	Carlisle United	28	(6)
1957–1958	Dumbarton		
1958–1959	King's Lynn		
- * Club domestic league appearances and goals

William Devlin (born 30 May 1931) is a Scottish footballer, who played for Peterborough, Carlisle and Dumbarton.
