= John Bonnar =

Scottish footballer

Personal information
- Date of birth: 11 January 1924
- Place of birth: West Calder, Scotland
- Date of death: 14 January 2004 (aged 80)
- Place of death: Glasgow, Scotland
- Position: Goalkeeper

Senior career*
Years	Team	Apps	(Gls)
1946–1948	Arbroath	50	(0)
1948–1958	Celtic	180	(0)
1958–1959	Dumbarton	25	(0)
1959–1960	St Johnstone	30	(0)
Total		200	(0)
- * Club domestic league appearances and goals

Johnny Bonnar (11 January 1924 – 14 January 2004) was a Scottish footballer who played as a goalkeeper for Arbroath, Celtic, Dumbarton and St Johnstone.

Bonnar signed for Celtic from Arbroath on 9 August 1948 and made his league debut in the 4–0 victory over Clyde on 6 November that year. Despite playing second (and even third fiddle) he was given his back chance on Hogmany 1949 when Willie Miller was injured and it was Bonnar and not Alex Devanny given the nod to play. He was soon heralded as "Celtic's best since John Thomson". Although small, Bonnar was agile enough to make over a century of league appearances for Celtic, and over 200 appearances altogether. Bonnar was not particularly tall for a goalkeeper but was able to produce moments of magic. He was Celtic's goalkeeper and hero in the 1953 Coronation Cup final against Hibs, where he kept their Famous Five forward line at bay, it is considered to be one of the best performances ever by a Celtic goalkeeper. Bonnar achieved 49 clean sheets in his 180 competitive appearances for Celtic.

In 1954 he played his part in a league and Scottish Cup double for Celtic. Additionally, in 1954 he made four world-class saves against Partick Thistle on 20 March to help Celtic to the points on the road to a league title win. This adds to the affection the support from the time had for him. Bonnar moved to Dumbarton in 1958 - he had lost his place in the first team to Dick Beattie three years earlier and had made only sporadic appearances thereafter. After his spell at Dumbarton, Bonnar left the game to concentrate on business interests. However, St Johnstone managed to entice him back, where he helped the club win promotion for the first time.
