= Gordon Clydesdale =

Scottish footballer

Personal information
- Full name: Gordon Clydesdale
- Date of birth: 28 May 1938 (age 88)
- Position: Inside left

Senior career*
Years	Team	Apps	(Gls)
1958–1960	St Mirren		
1959–1960	Dumbarton	6	(5)
1960	Olympia		
- * Club domestic league appearances and goals

Gordon Clydesdale (born 28 May 1938) was a Scottish footballer who played for St Mirren and Dumbarton.

In 1960, he played abroad in Canada's National Soccer League with Olympia.
