= Murdo Tait =

Scottish footballer

Personal information
- Full name: Murdo McLennan Tait
- Date of birth: 15 March 1938 (age 88)
- Position: Inside forward

Youth career
- RAF

Senior career*
Years	Team	Apps	(Gls)
1959–1960	Dumbarton	2	(0)
- * Club domestic league appearances and goals

Murdo McLennan Tait (born 15 March 1938) was a Scottish footballer who played for Dumbarton.
