= Con Murray =

Scottish footballer (1932–2015)

Personal information
- Full name: Constantine Murray
- Date of birth: 8 May 1932
- Place of birth: Glasgow, Scotland
- Date of death: 2015 (aged 82)
- Place of death: Glasgow, Scotland
- Position: Goalkeeper

Youth career
- Duntocher Hibs

Senior career*
| Years | Team | Apps | (Gls) |
| 1957–1959 | Dumbarton | 47 | (0) |
| 1959–1960 | Forfar Athletic | 5 | (0) |
- * Club domestic league appearances and goals

Constantine Murray (8 May 1932 – 2015) was a Scottish footballer who played for Forfar Athletic and Dumbarton. He died in Glasgow in 2015, aged 82.
