= 1961–62 Scottish Division Two =

Scottish Second Division
- Season: 1961–62
- Champions: Clyde
- Promoted: Clyde; Queen of the South

The 1961–62 Scottish Second Division was won by Clyde who, along with second placed Queen of the South, were promoted to the First Division. Brechin City finished bottom.

== Table ==
Pos	Team	Pld	W	D	L	GF	GA	GD	Pts	Promotion or relegation
1	Clyde	36	25	4	7	108	47	+61	54	Promotion to the 1962–63 First Division
2	Queen of the South	36	24	5	7	78	33	+45	53	Promotion to the 1962–63 First Division
3	Morton	36	19	6	11	78	64	+14	44	
4	Alloa Athletic	36	17	8	11	92	78	+14	42	
5	Montrose	36	15	11	10	63	50	+13	41	
6	Arbroath	36	17	7	12	66	59	+7	41	
7	Stranraer	36	14	11	11	61	62	−1	39	
8	Berwick Rangers	36	16	6	14	83	70	+13	38	
9	Ayr United	36	15	8	13	71	63	+8	38	
10	East Fife	36	15	7	14	60	59	+1	37	
11	East Stirlingshire	36	15	4	17	70	81	−11	34	
12	Queen's Park	36	12	9	15	64	62	+2	33	
13	Hamilton Academical	36	14	5	17	78	79	−1	33	
14	Cowdenbeath	36	11	9	16	65	77	−12	31	
15	Stenhousemuir	36	13	5	18	69	86	−17	31	
16	Forfar Athletic	36	11	8	17	68	76	−8	30	
17	Dumbarton	36	9	10	17	49	66	−17	28	
18	Albion Rovers	36	10	5	21	42	74	−32	25	
19	Brechin City	36	5	2	29	44	123	−79	12	

Source: "1961-1962 Second Division - SPFL Archive". SPFL.
