= Jim Brown (footballer, born 1939) =

Scottish footballer

Personal information
- Full name: James Birrell Brown
- Date of birth: 7 June 1939
- Place of birth: Stirling, Scotland
- Date of death: 18 January 2015 (aged 75)
- Place of death: Sauchie, Scotland
- Position: Wing half

Senior career*
Years	Team	Apps	(Gls)
–	Alva Albion Rangers		
1957–1960	Dumbarton	2	(0)
1960–1963	Darlington	14	(0)
- * Club domestic league appearances and goals

James Birrell Brown (7 June 1939 – 18 January 2015) was a Scottish footballer, who played as a wing half in the Scottish League for Dumbarton and in the English Football League for Darlington.
