= Jackie Neeson =

Scottish footballer

Personal information
- Full name: John Neeson
- Place of birth: Scotland
- Position: Outside right

Youth career
- Drumchapel Amateur

Senior career*
Years	Team	Apps	(Gls)
1961–1962	Dumbarton	18	(6)
1962–1963	Queen's Park	23	(1)

International career
1962–1963	Scotland Amateurs	3	(0)
- * Club domestic league appearances and goals

John Neeson was a Scottish amateur football outside right who played in the Scottish League for Queen's Park and Dumbarton. He was capped by Scotland at amateur level.
