= Alex Duchart =

Scottish footballer (1933–2022)

Personal information
- Full name: Alexander Duchart
- Date of birth: 3 May 1933
- Place of birth: Falkirk, Scotland
- Date of death: 14 December 2022 (aged 89)
- Place of death: Larbert, Scotland
- Position: Left winger

Senior career*
Years	Team	Apps	(Gls)
- Petershill
1953–1955	Hibernian	3	(0)
1955–1956	Third Lanark	19	(6)
1956–1957	Southend United	8	(2)
1957–1959	East Fife	59	(33)
1959–1961	Dumbarton	46	(21)
1961–1963	Falkirk	43	(19)
- Yiewsley
- Caledonian
Total		178	(81)
- * Club domestic league appearances and goals

Alexander Duchart (3 May 1933 – 14 December 2022) was a Scottish footballer who played as a left winger for Hibernian, Third Lanark, Southend United, East Fife, Dumbarton and Falkirk before transferring into the English Southern League (Non-League) at that time to Yiewsley F.C. Having spent only a few months at Yiewsley, Duchart transferred back to Scotland to Brechin City. From Brechin, he finished his career by moving into the Highland Football League with Inverness Caledonian.

Duchart died on 14 December 2022, at the age of 89.
