= Jackie Webb (footballer) =

Scottish footballer

Personal information
- Full name: John Gardiner Webb
- Date of birth: 6 May 1943 (age 83)
- Position: Winger

Senior career*
Years	Team	Apps	(Gls)
1961–1963	Dumbarton	12	(2)
1963–1964	Portadown		
- * Club domestic league appearances and goals

John Gardiner 'Jackie' Webb (born 6 May 1943) was a Scottish footballer who played for Dumbarton and Portadown.
