= Hugh Murney =

Scottish footballer (1939–2023)

Personal information
- Full name: Hugh Patrick Murney
- Date of birth: 29 January 1939
- Date of death: 23 August 2023 (aged 84)
- Position: Wing-half

Youth career
- Beith

Senior career*
Years	Team	Apps	(Gls)
1958–1961	Morton	73	(12)
1960–1962	Dumbarton	37	(2)
1961–1963	Queen of the South	8	(2)
1963–1964	Gloucester City		
1963–1964	East Stirling		
1965–1969	Melbourne Hakoah		
1970	Lions	21	(3)
- * Club domestic league appearances and goals

Hugh Patrick Murney (29 January 1939 – 23 August 2023) was a Scottish footballer who played as a wing-half for Morton, Dumbarton, Queen of the South, Gloucester City and East Stirling. A promising young footballer, he made his debut for Greenock Morton at age 18, missing all but five league matches in his first senior season in 1957-58.

He later continued his playing career with Melbourne Hakoah in the Victorian State League, before taking up coaching.

Murney died on 23 August 2023, at the age of 84, after suffering Dementia.
