= Doug Robertson (footballer) =

Scottish footballer

Personal information
- Position: Goalkeeper

Youth career
- Drumchapel Amateurs

Senior career*
| Years | Team | Apps | (Gls) |
| 1959–1966 | Dumbarton | 110 | (0) |
- * Club domestic league appearances and goals

Doug Robertson was a Scottish footballer who broke through into the senior ranks with Dumbarton in the late 1950s. After signing up in August 1959, he had over 100 appearances for Dumbarton before being released in April 1966.
