= Leslie Brown (Scottish footballer) =

Scottish footballer

Personal information
- Full name: Leslie Brown
- Position: Forward

Youth career
- Kirkintilloch Rob Roy

Senior career*
Years	Team	Apps	(Gls)
1954–1960	Dumbarton	120	(34)
1959–1960	Chelmsford City		
- * Club domestic league appearances and goals

Leslie Brown was a Scottish football player during the late 1950s and early 1960s. He started his career with junior side Kirkintilloch Rob Roy before signing 'senior' with Dumbarton. Here he played with distinction, being a constant in the Dumbarton attack for over four seasons.
