= Jim Kilgannon =

Scottish footballer (1937–2000)

Personal information
- Full name: James Welsh Kilgannon
- Date of birth: 15 August 1937
- Place of birth: Bannockburn, Scotland
- Date of death: 24 July 2000 (aged 62)
- Place of death: Bannockburn, Scotland
- Position: Wing half

Youth career
- Cowie Juveniles

Senior career*
Years	Team	Apps	(Gls)
1954–1958	Falkirk		
1958–1959	Stirling Albion	12	(1)
1959–1961	Montrose	40	(1)
1960–1963	Dumbarton	76	(4)
1962–1964	East Stirling	34	(2)
1964–1965	ES Clydebank	33	(5)
1965–1968	Berwick Rangers	70	(9)
1968–1969	Alloa Athletic	7	(0)
- * Club domestic league appearances and goals

James Welsh Kilgannon (15 August 1937 – 24 July 2000) was a Scottish footballer who played for Falkirk, Stirling Albion, Montrose, Dumbarton, East Stirling, ES Clydebank, Berwick Rangers and Alloa Athletic.
