= Peter Haggerty =

Scottish footballer

Peter Haggarty
Personal information
- Full name: Peter Haggarty
- Date of birth: 5 August 1937 (age 89)
- Position: Centre half

Youth career
- Duntocher Hibs

Senior career*
Years	Team	Apps	(Gls)
1957–1961	Dumbarton	5	(0)
- * Club domestic league appearances and goals

Peter Haggarty (born 3 September 1937) was a Scottish footballer who started his career with junior side Duntocher Hibs before moving on to play 'senior' for Dumbarton.
