= John McCall (1950s footballer) =

Scottish footballer

Personal information
- Full name: John McCall
- Position: Wing half

Senior career*
Years	Team	Apps	(Gls)
1954–1959	Dumbarton	162	(8)
- * Club domestic league appearances and goals

John McCall was a Scottish footballer during the late 1950s. Following a brief spell with Gloucester City he signed up with Dumbarton in the summer of 1954. Here he played with distinction, being a constant in the Dumbarton team for over four seasons.
