= David Fagan (footballer) =

Scottish footballer

Personal information
- Full name: David John Fagan
- Date of birth: 13 March 1938 (age 88)
- Position: Half back

Youth career
- West Calder United

Senior career*
Years	Team	Apps	(Gls)
1958–1960	Albion Rovers	28	(8)
1959–1960	St Mirren		
1959–1961	Dumbarton	23	(10)
1963–1965	Albion Rovers	4	(0)
- * Club domestic league appearances and goals

David John Fagan (born 13 March 1938) was a Scottish footballer who played for Albion Rovers, St Mirren and Dumbarton.
