= Andy Jardine =

Scottish footballer

Personal information
- Date of birth: 25 November 1935
- Place of birth: Paisley, Scotland
- Date of death: 4 July 2014 (aged 78)
- Place of death: Paisley, Scotland
- Position: Full back

Youth career
- Port Glasgow

Senior career*
Years	Team	Apps	(Gls)
1957–1967	Dumbarton	298	(2)
- * Club domestic league appearances and goals

Andy Jardine was a Scottish footballer who played during the 1950s and 1960s. He started his career with junior side Port Glasgow before signing 'senior' with Dumbarton in 1957. Here he was a constant in the Dumbarton defence for over 10 years and holds the record number of league appearances for the club.

Jardine formed a famous full back partnership with Tommy Govan for a decade with a total of 309 appearances in Dumbarton shirts. They each received a special presentation from the Scottish Professional Footballers' Association when they retired.
