= Tom Craig (footballer) =

Scottish footballer

Personal information
- Position: Half back

Youth career
- Kirkintilloch Rob Roy

Senior career*
Years	Team	Apps	(Gls)
1955–1961	Dumbarton	131	(4)
1960–1968	East Stirling	257	(2)
- * Club domestic league appearances and goals

Tom Craig was a Scottish football player during the 1950s and 1960s. He started his career with junior side Kirkintilloch Rob Roy before signing 'senior' with Dumbarton. Here he played with distinction, being a constant in the half back line for over four seasons. In 1960, he transferred to East Stirling where he served for eight seasons (including the 1964–65 season with E.S. Clydebank). He saw out his career where he started with 'Rob Roy'.
