= Tom Whalen (footballer) =

Scottish footballer

Personal information
- Full name: Thomas Whalen
- Date of birth: 9 September 1931
- Place of birth: Dumbarton, Scotland
- Date of death: 2014 (aged 82–83)
- Position: Inside forward

Youth career
- Duntocher Hibs

Senior career*
Years	Team	Apps	(Gls)
1955–1961	Dumbarton	121	(44)
1961–1962	Berwick Rangers	1	(0)
- * Club domestic league appearances and goals

Thomas Whalen (9 September 1931 – 2014) was a Scottish footballer who played for Berwick Rangers and Dumbarton.
