= Charlie Stewart (Scottish footballer) =

Scottish footballer

Personal information
- Full name: Charlie Stewart
- Position: Outside left

Youth career
- Johnstone Burgh

Senior career*
Years	Team	Apps	(Gls)
1957–1962	Dumbarton	106	(50)
1959–1961	Morton	33	(15)
1962–1963	Stenhousemuir	21	(6)
- * Club domestic league appearances and goals

Charlie Stewart was a Scottish football player during the 1950s and 1960s. He started his career with junior side Johnstone Burgh before signing 'senior' with Dumbarton. Here he played with distinction, being a constant in the attack for three seasons. He moved twice to play with Morton but on each occasion returned to Dumbarton – and finally saw out his career with Stenhousemuir.
