= Hugh Gallacher (footballer, born 1930) =

Scottish footballer (1930–2013)

Personal information
- Full name: Hugh Gallacher
- Date of birth: 26 November 1930
- Place of birth: Vale of Leven, Scotland
- Date of death: 14 June 2013 (aged 82)
- Place of death: Clydebank, Scotland
- Position: Centre forward

Youth career
- Duntocher Hibs

Senior career*
Years	Team	Apps	(Gls)
1951–1954	Arbroath	61	(26)
1954–1961	Dumbarton	185	(170)
1960–1961	Clyde	5	(2)
1960–1961	Queen of the South	7	(2)
1961–1962	Dumbarton	6	(1)
1962–1963	South Shields		
- * Club domestic league appearances and goals

Hugh Gallacher (26 November 1930 – 14 June 2013) was a Scottish footballer who played for Arbroath, Dumbarton, Clyde, Queen of the South and South Shields.

Gallacher is best known for his time at Dumbarton where in less than eight seasons scored 205 goals in major competitions from 220 games for the club. He played a massive role in the revival of Dumbarton FC who had been relegated to C Division in 1954. The following season Dumbarton benefited from a league reconstruction, where subsequently they finished in the top half of the Second Division for the first time in many years.
