= Tommy Govan =

Scottish footballer

Personal information
- Full name: Tommy Govan
- Position: Full back

Youth career
- Alva Albion Rangers

Senior career*
Years	Team	Apps	(Gls)
1957–1967	Dumbarton	249	(4)
1967–1968	Alloa Athletic		
- * Club domestic league appearances and goals

Tommy Govan was a Scottish footballer who played during the 1950s and 1960s. He started his career with juvenile side Alva Albion Rangers before signing 'senior' with Dumbarton in 1957. Here he was a constant in the Dumbarton defence for over 10 years before moving on to Alloa Athletic.
