= 1966–67 Dumbarton F.C. season =

Dumbarton
1966–1967 season
- Manager: Willie Toner
- Stadium: Boghead Park, Dumbarton
- Scottish League Division 2: 14th
- Scottish Cup: First Round
- Scottish League Cup: Prelims
- Top goalscorer: League: Harry Kirk (13); All: Harry Kirk (13)

The 1966–67 season was the 83rd football season in which Dumbarton competed at a Scottish national level, entering the Scottish Football League, the Scottish Cup and the Scottish League Cup. In addition Dumbarton competed in the Stirlingshire Cup.

== Scottish Second Division ==
This was to be an uninspiring league season from the start, with only two wins achieved by December, and which ultimately saw Dumbarton finish in 14th place, with 33 points, a massive 36 behind champions Morton.

24 August 1966 Division 2	Forfar Athletic	1–0	Dumbarton	Station Park, Forfar
	Buchan 46'			Attendance: 750; Referee: J Gordon

7 September 1966 Division 2	Dumbarton	2–3	Raith Rovers	Boghead Park
	McGowan 36'; Kirk 37'		Gardner 14'; Lister 51'; Stein 72'	Referee: J Callaghan

10 September 1966 Division 2	Clydebank	1–3	Dumbarton	Kilbowie Park
	McGhee 60'		McDoanld 42'; McMahon 79', 80'	Attendance: 3,500; Referee: A McKenzie

14 September 1966 Division 2	Raith Rovers	2–0	Dumbarton	Starks Park
	Gardner 25'; Richardson 64'			Attendance: 1,250; Referee: A Crawley

17 September 1966 Division 2	Dumbarton	0–3	East Fife	Boghead Park
			Rutherford 23'; Christie 37'; Miller 89'	Attendance: 500; Referee: A Webster

21 September 1966 Division 2	Dumbarton	1–2	Forfar Athletic	Boghead Park
	Kirk 34'		Kennedy 30', 70'	Attendance: 700; Referee: R Wilson

24 September 1966 Division 2	Brechin City	0–0	Dumbarton	Glebe Park, Brechin
				Attendance: 800; Referee: A Webster

1 October 1966 Division 2	Dumbarton	2–2	Cowdenbeath	Boghead Park
	Nelson 16'; Kirk 68'		Trialist 70'; Donaldson 87'	Attendance: 500; Referee: J Kelly

8 October 1966 Division 2	Hamilton	4–2	Dumbarton	Douglas Park
	Gilmour 9', 12'; Thomson 25', 62'		McDonald 32'; McMahon 73'	Attendance: 1,500; Referee: R Gordon

15 October 1966 Division 2	Dumbarton	4–1	East Stirling	Boghead Park
	Kirk 10', 85'; Nelson 18', 33'		Jones 75'	Attendance: 500; Referee: D Thomson

22 October 1966 Division 2	Stranraer	2–1	Dumbarton	Stair Park
	Jeffrey 7'; Logan 59'		McBeth 58'	Attendance: 900; Referee: N Watson

29 October 1966 Division 2	Dumbarton	1–1	Queen of the South	Boghead Park
	Nelson 65'		Dick 70'	Attendance: 500; Referee: T Kellock

5 November 1966 Division 2	Stenhousemuir	1–1	Dumbarton	Ochilview Park
	Russell 1'		Young 75' (pen.)	Attendance: 500; Referee: J Barclay

12 November 1966 Division 2	Dumbarton	1–1	Arbraoth	Boghead Park
	McMahon 89'		Cast 80'	Attendance: 800; Referee: T Wharton

19 November 1966 Division 2	Montrose	3–1	Dumbarton	Links Park
	Falconer 18'; Starchan 25'; Kemp 89'		McEachran 8'	Attendance: 400; Referee: J Paterson

26 November 1966 Division 2	Dumbarton	0–1	Morton	Boghead Park
			Harper 68'	Attendance: 1,200; Referee: R Wilson

3 December 1966 Division 2	Dumbarton	3–0	Albion Rovers	Boghead Park
	Young 2'; Kirk 69'; Lynas 80'			Attendance: 800; Referee: B Padden

10 December 1966 Division 2	Berwick Rangers	0–1	Dumbarton	Shielfield Park
			Kirk 5'	Attendance: 450; Referee: M Watson

17 December 1966 Division 2	Queens Park	1–1	Dumbarton	Hampden Park
	Hay 62'		Young 86'	Referee: C Hutton

24 December 1966 Division 2	Dumbarton	1–2	Alloa Athletic	Boghead Park
	Kirk 30'		Flannigan 40', 63'	Referee: J Callaghan

31 December 1966 Division 2	Third Lanark	0–1	Dumbarton	Cathkin Park
			Kirk 46'	Attendance: 400; Referee: JRP Gordon

2 January 1967 Division 2	Dumbarton	2–2	Clydebank	Boghead Park
	McCormack 2'; McMahon 62'		Rankine 39'; Moy 76'	Attendance: 1,000; Referee: I Foote

3 January 1967 Division 2	East Fife	2–1	Dumbarton	Bayview Park, Methil
	Walker 33'; Waddell 53'		McMahon 28'	Attendance: 400; Referee: E Pringle

14 January 1967 Division 2	Cowdenbeath	6–1	Dumbarton	Central Park, Cowdenbeath
	Rolland 37', 79'; Henderson 63'; Clarke 66'; Burns 71', 82'		McCormack 88'	Attendance: 600; Referee: R Crockett

21 January 1967 Division 2	Dumbarton	1–3	Hamilton	Boghead Park
	Lynas 75'		Gilmour 35'; Thomson 82', 89'	Attendance: 700; Referee: R Davidson

4 February 1967 Division 2	East Stirling	4–0	Dumbarton	Firs Park
	Jones 13', 77'; McDonald 55'; Mitchell 71'			Attendance: 500; Referee: E Thomson

11 February 1967 Division 2	Dumbarton	1–0	Stranraer	Boghead Park
	Watson 15'			Attendance: 300; Referee: A McKenzie

18 February 1967 Division 2	Dumbarton	0–2	Brechin City	Boghead Park
			Sneddon 41'; Thomson 59'	Attendance: 500; Referee: A MacDonald

25 February 1967 Division 2	Queen of the South	2–3	Dumbarton	Palmerston Park
	Smith 48'; Dick 66'		McCormack 22', 29'; Young 77'	Attendance: 800; Referee: R Crawley

4 March 1967 Division 2	Dumbarton	3–1	Stenhousemuir	Boghead Park
	Nelson 62'; McMahon 82', 90'		McGregor 37'	Attendance: 500; Referee: W Syme

11 March 1967 Division 2	Arbroath	1–1	Dumbarton	Gayfield Park
	Jack 30'		Nelson 80'	Attendance: 1,750; Referee: R Crawley

18 March 1967 Division 2	Dumbarton	2–0	Montrose	Boghead Park
	Nelson 62'; Kirk 88'			Attendance: 350; Referee: D Small

25 March 1967 Division 2	Morton	4–0	Dumbarton	Cappielow Park
	Anderson 19', 84'; Sweeney 65'; Jardine 66' (o.g.)			Attendance: 4,000; Referee: J Callaghan

1 April 1967 Division 2	Albion Rovers	2–2	Dumbarton	Cliftonhill Stadium
	Jenkins 55'; Green 86'		Watson 47', 61'	Attendance: 300; Referee: J Stewart

8 April 1967 Division 2	Dumbarton	3–1	Berwick Rangers	Boghead Park
	Watson 29', 39'; Kirk 36'		Marra 41'	Attendance: 600; Referee: W Webster

11 April 1967 Division 2	Dumbarton	4–0	Queens Park	Boghead Park
	Buckley 5'; Moffat 15'; McMillan 28'; Watson 58'			Referee: J Kelly

22 April 1967 Division 2	Alloa Athletic	2–1	Dumbarton	Recreation Park, Alloa
	Marshall 16' (pen.), 75'		Moffat 5'	Attendance: 400; Referee: W Elliot

28 April 1967 Division 2	Dumbarton	5–1	Third Lanark	Boghead Park
	McCormack 1'; McMillan 19', 89'; Kirk 40', 46'		Kinnaird 66'

== Scottish League Cup ==
In the League Cup, there was little to cheer with only a single win and a draw from the six sectional matches which meant no further progress in the competition.

13 August 1966 Group 7	Airdrie	3–0	Dumbarton	Broomfield Park
	Marshall 23', 63'; McPheat 46'			Attendance: 1,500; Referee: M Stewart

17 August 1966 Group 7	Dumbarton	1–2	Queens Park	Boghead Park
	Young 27'		Campbell 60', 76'	Attendance: 800; Referee: W Anderson

20 August 1966 Group 7	Dumbarton	1–1	Queen of the South	Boghead Park
	McMahon 8'		McChesney 2'	Attendance: 1,000; Referee: W Syme

27 August 1966 Group 7	Dumbarton	1–2	Airdrie	Boghead Park
	Veitch 26' (pen.)		Kelly 31' (o.g.); Marshall 51'	Attendance: 750; Referee: I Foote

31 August 1966 Group 7	Queens Park	0–3	Dumbarton	Hampden Park
			Nelson 60'; Veitch 86' (pen.), 90'	Attendance: 2,000; Referee: C Hutton

3 September 1966 Group 7	Queen of the South	4–2	Dumbarton	Palmerston Park
	Dick 3'; Law 17', 60'; Dawson 89'		Nelson 19'; McDonald 88'	Attendance: 2,000; Referee: B Padden

== Scottish Cup ==
In the Scottish Cup, after a win over local rivals Clydebank in the second preliminary round, Dumbarton fell to Division 1 opponents Partick Thistle in the first round proper.

7 January 1967 Cup P2	Dumbarton	2–0	Clydebank	Boghead Park
	McCormack 20'; McMahon 36'			Attendance: 6,505; Referee: B Padden

28 January 1967 Cup R1	Partick Thistle	3–0	Dumbarton	Firhill Park
	Flannagan 6'; Rae 56', 74'			Attendance: 7,000; Referee: J Kelly

== Stirlingshire Cup ==
Dumbarton's bad luck in the Stirlingshire Cup continued to 'dog' them. A first round draw against Stirling Albion was decided by the toss of a coin - which Dumbarton lost - the second such loss in successive seasons.

17 October 1966 Semi Final	Dumbarton	1–1	Stirling Albion	Boghead Park
	Kirk 9'		Orr 42'	Referee: R Gordon

== Friendlies ==
6 August 1966 Friendly	Clydebank	1–1	Dumbarton	Kilbowie Park
	Moy		Goal

9 August 1966 Friendly	Dumbarton	5–6	Vale of Leven	Boghead Park
	Kirk; Young; Lynas; McBeth		Goal

11 October 1966 Friendly	Dumbarton	5–2	Ashfield	Boghead Park
	Goal		Goal

1 November 1966 Friendly	Dumbarton	2–2	Shettleston	Boghead Park
	McEachran; Crawford		Goal

22 November 1966 Friendly	Dumbarton	7–1	Vale of Leven	Boghead Park
	Lynas		Goal

28 May 1967 Friendly	Ross County	3-1	Dumbarton	Victoria Park, Dingwall
	Hosie 12'; Davidson 80'; Lornie		Watson 40'

== Player statistics ==
=== Squad ===
No.	Pos	Nat	Player	Total		Second Division		Scottish Cup		League Cup	
No.	Pos	Nat	Player	Apps	Goals	Apps	Goals	Apps	Goals	Apps	Goals
	GK	(Scotland) SCO	Andy Crawford	41	0	33	0	2	0	6	0
	GK	(Scotland) SCO	Maurice Dunne	6	0	5+1	0	0	0	0	0
	DF	(Scotland) SCO	Tommy Govan	29	0	24	0	2	0	3	0
	DF	(Scotland) SCO	Andy Jardine	40	0	33	0	2	0	5	0
	DF	(Scotland) SCO	Willie Scullion	1	0	1	0	0	0	0	0
	MF	(Scotland) SCO	Ronnie Curran	36	0	30	0	2	0	4	0
	MF	(Scotland) SCO	Stuart Gordon	1	0	1	0	0	0	0	0
	MF	(Scotland) SCO	Hugh Harra	33	0	29	0	1	0	2+1	0
	MF	(Scotland) SCO	Bobby Johnstone	8	0	4	0	0	0	4	0
	MF	(Scotland) SCO	Ron McDonald	17	3	12	2	0	0	5	1
	MF	(Scotland) SCO	Jimmy Veitch	7	3	2+1	0	0	0	3+1	3
	FW	(Scotland) SCO	Ray Buckley	6	2	6	2	0	0	0	0
	FW	(Scotland) SCO	Tommy Campbell	1	0	1	0	0	0	0	0
	FW	(Scotland) SCO	Tommy Gallagher	2	0	2	0	0	0	0	0
	FW	(Scotland) SCO	Des Herron	9	0	8+1	0	0	0	0	0
	FW	(Scotland) SCO	John Kelly	6	0	1+1	0	0	0	3+1	0
	FW	(Scotland) SCO	Harry Kirk	40	13	32	13	2	0	6	0
	FW	(Scotland) SCO	Jim Lynas	31	2	25	2	2	0	4	0
	FW	(Scotland) SCO	Hugh Mackrell	1	0	1	0	0	0	0	0
	FW	(Scotland) SCO	Andy McBeth	7	1	6	1	0	0	1	0
	FW	(Scotland) SCO	Roy McCormack	15	6	13	5	2	1	0	0
	FW	(Scotland) SCO	Andy McEachran	11	1	11	1	0	0	0	0
	FW	(Scotland) SCO	John McGhee	4	0	4	0	0	0	0	0
	FW	(Scotland) SCO	Mike McGowan	35	1	28+1	1	1	0	5	0
	FW	(Scotland) SCO	Tommy McLeod	1	0	1	0	0	0	0	0
	FW	(Scotland) SCO	Hugh McMahon	28	10	22+1	8	2	1	3	1
	FW	(Scotland) SCO	Ally McMillan	8	3	8	3	0	0	0	0
	FW	(Scotland) SCO	Alex Moffat	4	2	4	2	0	0	0	0
	FW	(Scotland) SCO	Drew Nelson	38	9	30	7	2	0	6	2
	FW	(Scotland) SCO	Ian Rodger	10	0	9	0	1	0	0	0
	FW	(Scotland) SCO	Allan Watson	7	6	7	6	0	0	0	0
	FW	(Scotland) SCO	Bobby Young	33	5	25+1	4	1	0	6	1

=== Transfers ===
Amongst those players joining and leaving the club were the following:

==== Players in ====
Player	From	Date
(Scotland) Mike McGowan	(Scotland) Celtic	12 Jul 1966
(Scotland) Harry Kirk	(Scotland) Falkirk	9 Aug 1966
(Scotland) Bobby Young	(Scotland) Berwick Rangers	9 Aug 1966
(Scotland) Roy McCormack	(Scotland) Yoker Ath	6 Jan 1967
(Scotland) Allan Watson	(Scotland) Vale of Leven	8 Apr 1967
(Scotland) John McGhee	(Scotland) Vale of Leven	15 Apr 1967

==== Players out ====
Player	To	Date
(Scotland) Jimmy Veitch	(Scotland) Berwick Rangers	20 Sep 1966
(Scotland) Drew Nelson	(Scotland) East Fife	23 Mar 1967
(Scotland) Bobby Young	(Scotland) Freed	1 Apr 1967
(Scotland) Tommy Govan	(Scotland) Freed	30 Apr 1967
(Scotland) Hugh Harra	(Scotland) Freed	30 Apr 1967
(Scotland) Andy Jardine	(Scotland) Freed	30 Apr 1967
(Scotland) John Kelly	(Scotland) Freed	30 Apr 1967
(Scotland) Andy McBeth	(Scotland) Freed	30 Apr 1967
