= 1967–68 Dumbarton F.C. season =

Dumbarton
1967–1968 season
- Manager: Willie Toner/ Ian Spence
- Stadium: Boghead Park, Dumbarton
- Scottish League Division 2: 10th
- Scottish Cup: First Prelim Round
- Scottish League Cup: Prelims
- Top goalscorer: League: Roy McCormack (20); All: Roy McCormack (21)

The 1967–68 season was the 84th football season in which Dumbarton competed at a Scottish national level, entering the Scottish Football League, the Scottish Cup and the Scottish League Cup. In addition Dumbarton competed in the Stirlingshire Cup.

== Scottish Second Division ==
Manager Willie Toner was to wield the axe with the playing staff before the start of the season, and a number of long serving players were to leave the club. However, with only one win taken from the first five league games, Willie Toner's youth policy was not proving successful and he resigned his position as manager to be replaced a week later by Ian Spence. The damage however had already been done and Dumbarton finished in 10th place, with 33 points, 29 behind champions St Mirren.

23 August 1967 Division 2	Dumbarton	0–4	St Mirren	Boghead Park
			Kane 3'; Adamson 57'; Pinkerton 67'; Renton 85'	Attendance: 1,675; Referee: S Anderson

9 September 1967 Division 2	Dumbarton	5–4	Clydebank	Boghead Park
	Henderson 4'; McCormack 9'; McGoldrick 18', 64', 71'		King 8'; Baxter 27', 43'; Moy 38'	Attendance: 2,500; Referee: W Syme

13 September 1967 Division 2	St Mirren	4–0	Dumbarton	Love Street (stadium)
	Pinkerton 6', 11'; Hamilton 21'; Kane 83'			Attendance: 2,065; Referee: D Small

16 September 1967 Division 2	East Fife	3–3	Dumbarton	Love Street (stadium)
	Dewar 35', 40'; Miller 71' (pen.)		McMillan 25'; McCormack 60'; McGoldrick 70'	Attendance: 1,500; Referee: R Henderson

20 September 1967 Division 2	Dumbarton	2–2	Cowdenbeath	Boghead Park
	McGowan 72'; McCormack 87'		Burns 17'; Donaldson 37'	Attendance: 700; Referee: T Kellock

23 September 1967 Division 2	Dumbarton	4–0	Stranraer	Boghead Park
	McCormack 5'; McMillan 14'; McGowan 24'; McGoldrick 72'			Attendance: 1,000; Referee: J McKee

27 September 1967 Division 2	Cowdenbeath	6–2	Dumbarton	Central Park, Cowdenbeath
	Connelly 3', 17'; Taylor 7', 63'; Donaldson 53'; Sugden 73'		McMillan 8'; Reid 70'	Attendance: 1,000; Referee: E Pringle

30 September 1967 Division 2	Hamilton	3–3	Dumbarton	Douglas Park
	Vint 16'; Gilchrist 30'; Thomson 72'		McGoldrick 15', 33', 63'	Attendance: 800; Referee: A Crawley

7 October 1967 Division 2	Dumbarton	2–0	Brechin City	Boghead Park
	McMillan 1'; McCormack 42'			Attendance: 1,000; Referee: R Padden

21 October 1967 Division 2	Forfar Athletic	3–3	Dumbarton	Station Park, Forfar
	Walker 50'; Young 71'; May 83'		McMillan 28'; McCormack 39', 84'	Attendance: 600; Referee: A Currie

28 October 1967 Division 2	Dumbarton	2–0	East Stirling	Boghead Park
	McCormack 13', 18'			Attendance: 1,300; Referee: T Callaghan

4 November 1967 Division 2	Stenhousemuir	1–1	Dumbarton	Ochilview Park
	Trialist 85'		Watson 60'	Attendance: 500; Referee: T Wharton

11 November 1967 Division 2	Dumbarton	2–0	Montrose	Boghead Park
	McGoldrick 15'; McCormack 19'			Attendance: 900; Referee: J Kelly

18 November 1967 Division 2	Ayr United	3–0	Dumbarton	Somerset Park
	Ingram 20', 34'; Hawkshaw 40'			Attendance: 3,000; Referee: R Crawford

25 November 1967 Division 2	Dumbarton	1–0	Albion Rovers	Boghead Park
	Lynas 75'			Attendance: 1,300; Referee: R Crawford

2 December 1967 Division 2	Queen of the South	5–2	Dumbarton	Palmerston Park
	Dick 2', 11'; Jackson 15'; Carroll 65'; Davison 72'		Watson 23', 25'	Referee: W Anderson

9 December 1967 Division 2	Dumbarton	3–4	Arbroath	Boghead Park
	Henderson 7', 40', 82'		Bruce 21'; Striling 49' (pen.); Jack 56', 89'	Attendance: 1,500; Referee: A Webster

30 December 1967 Division 2	Dumbarton	0–2	Queen's Park	Boghead Park
			Campbell 2'; Hay 65'	Attendance: 700; Referee: W Elliott

1 January 1968 Division 2	Clydebank	2–1	Dumbarton	Kilbowie Park
	Moy 49', 65'		Moffat 50'	Attendance: 1,084; Referee: T Kellock

2 January 1968 Division 2	Dumbarton	1–1	East Fife	Boghead Park
	McCormack 26'		Waddell 17'	Attendance: 700; Referee: A Crawley

6 January 1968 Division 2	Stranraer	1–3	Dumbarton	Stair Park
	McMillan 33'		Watson 83', 85'; Reid 90'	Attendance: 450; Referee: J McKee

13 January 1968 Division 2	Dumbarton	0–1	Hamilton	Boghead Park
			Forrest 11'	Attendance: 800; Referee: S Anderson

20 January 1968 Division 2	Brechin City	0–4	Dumbarton	Glebe Park, Brechin
			Watson 24'; McGoldrick 40'; McCormack 52', 77'	Attendance: 800; Referee: W Mullen

24 January 1968 Division 2	Queen's Park	2–3	Dumbarton	Hampden Park
	McKay 9'; Emery 35'		Henderson 26'; McGoldrick 51'; McCormack 84'	Attendance: 1,014; Referee: W Anderson

10 February 1968 Division 2	Dumbarton	3–6	Forfar Athletic	Boghead Park
	McGoldrick 42', 69', 79'		Trialist 5'; Harvie 19'; Knox 40', 64'; Rutherford 53', 72'	Referee: A McDonald

17 February 1968 Division 2	East Stirling	2–2	Dumbarton	Firs Park
	Barkey 2'; Donnachie 74'		McGoldrick 80'; Moffat 84'	Attendance: 650; Referee: T Anderson

2 March 1968 Division 2	Dumbarton	1–1	Stenhousemuir	Boghead Park
	Graham 21'		Richardson 72'	Attendance: 300; Referee: J Kelly

9 March 1968 Division 2	Montrose	1–3	Dumbarton	Links Park
	Kemp 15'		McCormack 10', 61'; Henderson 38'	Attendance: 600; Referee: W Balfour

30 March 1968 Division 2	Dumbarton	1–1	Queen of the South	Boghead Park
	McCormack 60'		Law 75'	Attendance: 600; Referee: A Webster

6 April 1968 Division 2	Arbroath	4–0	Dumbarton	Gayfield Park
	Jack 32', 58' (pen.); Bruce 44'; Easton 74'			Attendance: 1,500; Referee: W Syme

10 April 1968 Division 2	Albion Rovers	3–1	Dumbarton	Cliftonhill Stadium
	Coleman 25'; Graham 35'; Murphy 55' (pen.)		McGoldrick 49'	Referee: W Anderson

13 April 1968 Division 2	Dumbarton	3–0	Alloa Athletic	Boghead Park
	McCormack 21'; McGoldrick 36'			Attendance: 800; Referee: J Paterson

17 April 1968 Division 2	Dumbarton	0–0	Berwick Rangers	Boghead Park

20 April 1968 Division 2	Berwick Rangers	2–1	Dumbarton	Shielfield Park
	Smith 75'; Dowds 88'		Graham 73'	Attendance: 531; Referee: T Wharton

24 April 1968 Division 2	Alloa Athletic	2–0	Dumbarton	Recreation Park, Alloa
	Trialist 52', 79'			Attendance: 250; Referee: W Syme

29 April 1968 Division 2	Dumbarton	1–1	Ayr United	Boghead Park
	Malone 41'		Black 31'

== Scottish League Cup ==
In the League Cup, a single draw was all that there was to show from the six sectional games and therefore once again Dumbarton were no have no further interest in the competition.

12 August 1967 Group 7	Raith Rovers	2–0	Dumbarton	Starks Park
	Lister 7', 60'			Attendance: 2,000; Referee: R Davidson

16 August 1967 Group 7	Dumbarton	1–2	Queen of the South	Boghead Park
	Henderson 83'		Law 32'; King 60'	Attendance: 2,000; Referee: F Marshall

19 August 1967 Group 7	Morton	6–0	Dumbarton	Cappielow Park
	Taylor 7', 43'; Bartram 17', 71' (pen.); Sweeney 29', 61'			Attendance: 3,000; Referee: W Anderson

26 August 1967 Group 7	Dumbarton	1–1	Raith Rovers	Boghead Park
	McGoldrick 24'		Wallace 20'	Attendance: 1,000; Referee: W Elliot

30 August 1967 Group 7	Queen of the South	3–1	Dumbarton	Palmerston Park
	Davison 23', 85'; Jackson 89' (pen.)		Henderson 3'	Referee: W Anderson

2 September 1967 Group 7	Dumbarton	1–3	Morton	Boghead Park
	McCormack 27'		Mason 34', 70'; Bartram 89'	Attendance: 1,000; Referee: J Paterson

== Scottish Cup ==
In the Scottish Cup, Dumbarton were to fall in the first preliminary round to Berwick Rangers, after a draw.

16 December 1967 Cup P1	Dumbarton	0–0	Berwick Rangers	Boghead Park
				Attendance: 2,000; Referee: I Foote

23 December 1967 Cup P1r	Berwick Rangers	2–1	Dumbarton	Shielfield Park
	Logan 49'; Christie 79'		Lynas	Attendance: 1,000; Referee: W Mullen

== Stirlingshire Cup ==
Locally, for the third season in a row Dumbarton were to taste defeat, not on the pitch, but in the boardroom after the game as the Stirlingshire Cup semi final tie against Stirling Albion was decided by the toss of a coin.

27 March 1968 Semi Final	Stirling Albion	1–1	Dumbarton	Annfield Stadium
	Grant 73'		Watson 68'	Referee: J Grant

== Friendlies ==
4 August 1967 Friendly	Dunfermline Athletic	5–0	Dumbarton	East End Park
	Goal

8 August 1967 Friendly	Dumbarton	2–1	Celtic XI	Boghead Park
	McGoldrick; McCormack		Goal

12 October 1967 Friendly	Dumbarton	2–2	Rangers XI	Boghead Park
	McCormack 62'; McGoldrick 89'		Semple 53'; Wood 74'	Referee: H Dempsey

29 January 1968 Friendly	Dumbarton	4–3	Celtic XI	Boghead Park
	McCormack 25'; Craig 36' (o.g.); Connolly 53' (o.g.); Lynas 81'		Macari 48'; McKellar 82'; Hay	Referee: J Wilson

29 February 1968 Friendly	Dumbarton	2–3	Ross County	Boghead Park
	Lynas 51', 56'		Mackay 27'; Thom 69'; Lornie 80' (pen.)	Referee: J Callaghan

== Player statistics ==
=== Squad ===
No.	Pos	Nat	Player	Total		Second Division		Scottish Cup		League Cup	
No.	Pos	Nat	Player	Apps	Goals	Apps	Goals	Apps	Goals	Apps	Goals
	GK	(Scotland) SCO	David Anderson	9	0	9	0	0	0	0	0
	GK	(Scotland) SCO	Ian Bird	2	0	2	0	0	0	0	0
	GK	(Scotland) SCO	Andy Crawford	1	0	1	0	0	0	0	0
	GK	(Scotland) SCO	Maurice Dunne	11	0	5	0	0	0	6	0
	GK	(Scotland) SCO	Jim Eadie	5	0	5	0	0	0	0	0
	GK	(Scotland) SCO	Ian Ferguson	1	0	1	0	0	0	0	0
	GK	(Scotland) SCO	Dan McGuffog	3	0	3	0	0	0	0	0
	GK	(Scotland) SCO	Jim Meikleham	12	0	10	0	2	0	0	0
	DF	(Scotland) SCO	Joe Davin	40	0	33+1	0	2	0	4	0
	DF	(Scotland) SCO	Don May	27	0	20	0	2	0	5	0
	DF	(Scotland) SCO	Bill McMurray	12	0	12	0	0	0	0	0
	DF	(Scotland) SCO	Billy Wilkinson	5	0	4+1	0	0	0	0	0
	MF	(Scotland) SCO	Ronnie Curran	20	0	14	0	0	0	6	0
	MF	(Scotland) SCO	Johnny Graham	11	2	11	2	0	0	0	0
	MF	(Scotland) SCO	Bobby Johnstone	36	0	28	0	2	0	6	0
	MF	(Scotland) SCO	Jim Kiernan	8	0	8	0	0	0	0	0
	MF	(Scotland) SCO	Jim Leckie	1	0	1	0	0	0	0	0
	MF	(Scotland) SCO	Billy McConville	1	0	1	0	0	0	0	0
	MF	(Scotland) SCO	O'Sullivan	1	0	1	0	0	0	0	0
	MF	(Scotland) SCO	Willie Whyte	1	0	1	0	0	0	0	0
	FW	(Scotland) SCO	John Barratt	1	0	1	0	0	0	0	0
	FW	(Scotland) SCO	Alex Baxter	1	0	1	0	0	0	0	0
	FW	(Scotland) SCO	Ian Henderson	38	8	27+3	6	2	0	6	2
	FW	(Scotland) SCO	Jim Lynas	37	2	28+1	1	2	1	6	0
	FW	(Scotland) SCO	Dave Malone	1	1	1	1	0	0	0	0
	FW	(Scotland) SCO	Roy McCormack	40	21	34	20	2	0	4	1
	FW	(Scotland) SCO	Andy McEachran	2	1	1+1	1	0	0	0	0
	FW	(Scotland) SCO	John McGhee	24	0	20+2	0	2	0	0	0
	FW	(Scotland) SCO	John McGoldrick	41	17	30+4	16	1	0	6	1
	FW	(Scotland) SCO	Phil McGovern	1	0	1	0	0	0	0	0
	FW	(Scotland) SCO	Mike McGowan	28	2	21	2	2	0	5	0
	FW	(Scotland) SCO	Ally McMillan	15	5	11+1	5	0	0	3	0
	FW	(Scotland) SCO	Alex Moffat	5	2	3+2	2	0	0	0	0
	FW	(Scotland) SCO	Jim Peebles	1	0	1	0	0	0	0	0
	FW	(Scotland) SCO	Sammy Reid	19	2	12+2	2	0+2	0	3	0
	FW	(Scotland) SCO	Allan Watson	39	6	31	6	2	0	6	0
	FW	(Scotland) SCO	Billy Whitelaw	1	0	1	0	0	0	0	0
	FW	(Scotland) SCO	Trialists	2	0	2	0	0	0	0	0

=== Transfers ===
Amongst those players joining and leaving the club were the following:

==== Players in ====
Player	From	Date
(Scotland) Joe Davin	(Scotland) Morton	26 May 1967
(Scotland) Don May	(Scotland) Third Lanark	14 Jun 1967
(Scotland) Ian Henderson	(Scotland) Third Lanark	16 Jun 1967
(Scotland) John McGoldrick	(Scotland) Rutherglen Glencairn	12 Jul 1967
(Scotland) Sammy Reid	(Scotland) Berwick Rangers	26 Aug 1967
(Scotland) Johnny Graham	(Scotland) Arthurlie	12 Feb 1968
(Scotland) Bill McMurray	(Scotland) Albion Rovers	12 Feb 1968
(Scotland) Billy Wilkinson	(Scotland) St Anthonys	28 Feb 1968
(Scotland) David Anderson	(Scotland) Dunfermline Ath	25 Mar 1968

==== Players out ====
Player	To	Date
(Scotland) Andy Crawford	(Scotland) Morton	2 Sep 1967
(Scotland) Mike McGowan	(Northern Ireland) Ballymena Un	23 Mar 1968
(Scotland) Sammy Reid	(Scotland) Freed	23 Mar 1968
(Scotland) Maurice Dunne	(Scotland) Freed	30 Apr 1968
(Scotland) Ian Henderson	(Scotland) Freed	30 Apr 1968
(Scotland) Jim Lynas	(Scotland) Freed	30 Apr 1968
(Scotland) Don May	(Scotland) Freed	30 Apr 1968
(Scotland) Andy McEachran	(Scotland) Freed	30 Apr 1968
(Scotland) John McGoldrick	(Scotland) Freed	30 Apr 1968
(Scotland) Joe Davin	(Scotland) Retired	
