= 1968–69 Dumbarton F.C. season =

Dumbarton
1968–1969 season
- Manager: Ian Spence/ Jackie Stewart
- Stadium: Boghead Park, Dumbarton
- Scottish League Division 2: 14th
- Scottish Cup: First Round
- Scottish League Cup: Prelims
- Top goalscorer: League: Roy McCormack (19); All: Roy McCormack (26)

The 1968–69 season was the 85th football season in which Dumbarton competed at a Scottish national level, entering the Scottish Football League, the Scottish Cup and the Scottish League Cup. In addition Dumbarton competed in the Stirlingshire Cup.

== Scottish Second Division ==
Another poor start to a league season, with a single win and a draw from the first eight matches, resulted in the sacking of manager Ian Spence. His replacement, Jackie Stewart took charge on 1 December, and although results were to improve, nonetheless Dumbarton finished in a disappointing 14th place, with 27 points, 37 behind champions Motherwell.

21 August 1968 Division 2	Dumbarton	1–2	Montrose	Boghead Park
	McCormack 66'		Littlejohn; McDonald 21'	Referee: A Currie

4 September 1968 Division 2	Montrose	2–0	Dumbarton	Links Park
	Littlejohn 44', 84'			Attendance: 1,200; Referee: A Crawley

7 September 1968 Division 2	Clydebank	0–1	Dumbarton	Kilbowie Park
			Fallon 30' (o.g.)	Attendance: 3,500; Referee: W Syme

14 September 1968 Division 2	Dumbarton	1–3	Stirling Albion	Boghead Park
	McCormack 7'		Hughes 14'; Grant 18', 54'	Attendance: 1,000; Referee: J Mullan

18 September 1968 Division 2	East Fife	1–1	Dumbarton	Bayview Park, Methil
	Soutar 65'		McCormack 20'	Attendance: 1,500; Referee: E Pringle

21 September 1968 Division 2	East Stirling	4–1	Dumbarton	Firs Park
	McGuire 39'; Hamill 61'; Hulston 62'; Moore 82'		Watson 55'	Attendance: 1,300; Referee: J Kellock

28 September 1968 Division 2	Dumbarton	1–3	Stranraer	Boghead Park
	McCormack 19'		Campbell 44', 80'; Symington 51'	Attendance: 500; Referee: R Crawford

5 October 1968 Division 2	Stenhousemuir	3–2	Dumbarton	Ochilview Park
	Richardson 18'; Ramsay 53', 61'		McCormack 3'; Boyd 66'	Attendance: 500; Referee: I Bain

12 October 1968 Division 2	Dumbarton	3–1	Albion Rovers	Boghead Park
	Watson 47', 61'; Boyd 84'		Jemkins 80'	Attendance: 300; Referee: T Wharton

19 October 1968 Division 2	Berwick Rangers	2–0	Dumbarton	Shielfield Park
	Bowron 42', 47'			Attendance: 435; Referee: J Grant

26 October 1968 Division 2	Dumbarton	2–1	Brechin City	Boghead Park
	McCormack 22', 55'		Craib 23'	Attendance: 300; Referee: R Greenlees

2 November 1968 Division 2	Queen of the South	4–1	Dumbarton	Palmerston Park
	Henderson 7'; Roddie 9'; Collings 55'; Kerr 65' (pen.)		McCormack 83'	Attendance: 800; Referee: A MacDonald

9 November 1968 Division 2	Dumbarton	0–3	Ayr United	Boghead Park
			Ingram 27'; Malone 42'; Clarke 49'	Attendance: 400; Referee: A McKenzie

16 November 1968 Division 2	Forfar Athletic	2–0	Dumbarton	Station Park, Forfar
	Young 70', 83'			Attendance: 1,200; Referee: A Webster

23 November 1968 Division 2	Cowdenbeath	3–1	Dumbarton	Central Park, Cowdenbeath
	Sharp 25', 27'; Bostock 39'		Graham 65'	Attendance: 300; Referee: R Henderson

30 November 1968 Division 2	Dumbarton	1–0	Hamilton	Boghead Park
	Curran 42'			Attendance: 500; Referee: R Wilson

7 December 1968 Division 2	Dumbarton	4–1	Alloa Athletic	Boghead Park
	Boyd 6', 61'; McCormack 27', 60'		Thomson 59'	Attendance: 500; Referee: W Syme

14 December 1968 Division 2	Dumbarton	1–1	East Fife	Boghead Park
	McCormack 10'		Waddell 78'	Attendance: 500; Referee: T Marshall

21 December 1968 Division 2	Motherwell	1–1	Dumbarton	Fir Park
	Deans 81'		Easton 27'	Attendance: 4,000; Referee: D Padden

28 December 1968 Division 2	Dumbarton	0–2	Queen's Park	Boghead Park
			Hopper 17'; Mackay 47'	Attendance: 800; Referee: T Marshall

1 January 1969 Division 2	Dumbarton	3–3	Clydebank	Boghead Park
	Watson 14'; McCormack 47'; Boyd 57'		Caskie 44', 48'; O'Brien 76'	Attendance: 2,000; Referee: J Kelly

2 January 1969 Division 2	Stirling Albion	3–0	Dumbarton	Annfield Stadium
	Johnstone; McKinnon (pen.); McPhee			Attendance: 1,936; Referee: J Kelly

11 January 1969 Division 2	Stranraer	1–2	Dumbarton	Stair Park
	McMillan 14'		Boyd 48'; McCormack 88'	Attendance: 950; Referee: J McKee

18 January 1969 Division 2	Dumbarton	5–1	Stenhousemuir	Boghead Park
	Watson 4', 59'; McCormack 22', 75'; Boyd 29'		McGuckin 80'	Attendance: 500; Referee: W Anderson

1 February 1969 Division 2	Albion Rovers	1–2	Dumbarton	Cliftonhill Stadium
	McGovern 14'		Boyd 44'; McCormack 48'	Attendance: 500; Referee: A Crawley

8 February 1969 Division 2	Dumbarton	3–1	Berwick Rangers	Boghead Park
	Watson 40'; Currie 50', 60'		Logan 30'	Attendance: 500; Referee: J Callaghan

22 February 1969 Division 2	Dumbarton	0–2	Queen of the South	Boghead Park
			Mitchell 7'; Fauld 22'	Attendance: 700; Referee: A McDonald

1 March 1969 Division 2	Ayr United	4–0	Dumbarton	Somerset Park
	McCulloch 17'; Malone 45' (pen.); Ingram 65', 84'			Attendance: 2,000; Referee: A Currie

8 March 1969 Division 2	Dumbarton	2–3	Forfar Athletic	Boghead Park
	McCormack 1'; Young 24' (o.g.)		Young; Graham 38' (o.g.); Knox 52'	Attendance: 500; Referee: R Davidson

15 March 1969 Division 2	Dumbarton	0–3	Cowdenbeath	Boghead Park
			Taylor 35'; Bostock 72', 77'	Attendance: 400; Referee: J Paterson

22 March 1969 Division 2	Hamilton	0–0	Dumbarton	Douglas Park
				Attendance: 250; Referee: R Greenlees

29 March 1969 Division 2	Alloa Athletic	0–1	Dumbarton	Recreation Park, Alloa
			Boyd 89'	Attendance: 400; Referee: R Wilson

9 April 1969 Division 2	Brechin City	1–0	Dumbarton	Glebe Park, Brechin
	Reid 30'			Attendance: 300; Referee: R Gordon

12 April 1969 Division 2	Dumbarton	2–4	Motherwell	Boghead Park
	McMicahel 66'; McCormack 88'		Donnelly 32'; Deans 41'; Muir 46'; Goldthorpe 89'	Attendance: 1,200; Referee: T Kellock

19 April 1969 Division 2	Queen's Park	2–0	Dumbarton	Hampden Park
	Whitehead 33'; Hunter 34'			Attendance: 977; Referee: F Watson

25 April 1969 Division 2	Dumbarton	4–1	East Stirling	Boghead Park
	McCormack 4'; Easton 17'; Watson 35'; McMichael 76'		Donnachie 60' (pen.)	Referee: S Anderson

== Scottish League Cup ==
In the League Cup, two wins from the six sectional games were never going to be enough to qualify for the knock out stages of the competition.

10 August 1968 Group 8	Dumbarton	0–4	Albion Rovers	Boghead Park
			Graham 24'; Coleman 47', 74'; Murphy 81'	Attendance: 1,500; Referee: A McDonald

14 August 1968 Group 8	Forfar Athletic	1–0	Dumbarton	Station Park, Forfar
	Davis 35'			Attendance: 1,000; Referee: R Crawford

17 August 1968 Group 8	Dumbarton	4–3	Queen's Park	Boghead Park
	McGhee 24', 50'; McCormack 42', 78'		McKay 19', 77'; Graham 23' (o.g.)	Attendance: 1,485; Referee: R Davidson

24 August 1968 Group 8	Albion Rovers	5–0	Dumbarton	Cliftonhill Stadium
	Green 14', 27', 85'; Jenkins 55'; McGovern 57'			Attendance: 2,500; Referee: A Crawley

28 August 1968 Group 8	Dumbarton	5–1	Forfar Athletic	Boghead Park
	McCormack 14', 50', 89'; Graham 20'; Easton 39'		Stewart 84'	Attendance: 2,000; Referee: B Padden

31 August 1968 Group 8	Queen's Park	1–0	Dumbarton	Hampden Park
	Hay 40'			Attendance: 1,885; Referee: A McKenzie

== Scottish Cup ==
In the Scottish Cup, Dumbarton scrapped past non-league Vale of Leithen in the second preliminary round, but were not disgraced in their single goal defeat to First Division opponents St Mirren in the first round proper.

4 January 1969 Cup P2	Dumbarton	3–2	Vale of Leithan	Boghead Park
	McCormack 14', 17', Watson 43'		Whitelaw 9'; Duncan 75'	Attendance: 1,000; Referee: J McKee

25 January 1969 Cup R1	Dumbarton	0–1	St Mirren	Boghead Park
			Blair 89'	Attendance: 8,860; Referee: T Kellock

== Stirlingshire Cup ==
Locally, in the Stirlingshire Cup Dumbarton lost in the first round to East Stirling.

21 October 1968 First Round	East Stirling	3–1	Dumbarton	Firs Park
	Hamill 26'; Moore 50'; Hulston 85'		Boyd 60'

== Friendlies ==
Dumbarton undertook a 'mini' pre-season tour across the border - the first games played in England by the club for almost a decade.

31 July 1968 Friendly	(England) Chester City	4–1	Dumbarton	Sealand Road
	Sutton 1'; Ashworth 32' (pen.); Talbot 45'; Weston 64'		McMurray 2'	Attendance: 3,904; Referee: J Greenwood

2 August 1968 Friendly	(England) Southport	0–3	Dumbarton	Haig Avenue
			McGhee 14', 27'; Watson 60'	Attendance: 2,271

5 August 1968 Friendly	Dumbarton	2–2	(England) Tranmere Rovers	Boghead Park
	Graham 38'; McCully 79'		Hudson 17', 28'	Attendance: 2,500; Referee: R Gordon

11 September 1968 Friendly	Dumbarton	2–3	Hearts XI	Boghead Park
	McCormack 9'; Brown 12'		Elgin 24', 56'; Cruikshanks 41'

4 April 1969 Friendly	Dumbarton	2–1	Partick Thistle XI	Boghead Park
	Goal		Goal

== Player statistics ==
=== Squad ===
No.	Pos	Nat	Player	Total		Second Division		Scottish Cup		League Cup	
No.	Pos	Nat	Player	Apps	Goals	Apps	Goals	Apps	Goals	Apps	Goals
	GK	(Scotland) SCO	David Anderson	31	0	24	0	2	0	5	0
	GK	(Scotland) SCO	Steve Anderson	2	0	2	0	0	0	0	0
	GK	(Scotland) SCO	Jim Harkins	9	0	9	0	0	0	0	0
	GK	(Scotland) SCO	Walter Smith	3	0	2	0	0	0	1	0
	DF	(Scotland) SCO	Bill McMurray	41	0	32+1	0	2	0	6	0
	DF	(Scotland) SCO	George Muir	38	0	31	0	1	0	6	0
	DF	(Scotland) SCO	Alex Smith	2	0	2	0	0	0	0	0
	DF	(Scotland) SCO	Billy Wilkinson	15	0	8+2	0	0	0	5	0
	MF	(Scotland) SCO	Jackie Boyle	3	0	3	0	0	0	0	0
	MF	(Scotland) SCO	Len Campbell	24	0	22	0	2	0	0	0
	MF	(Scotland) SCO	Willie Cunningham	1	0	1	0	0	0	0	0
	MF	(Scotland) SCO	Ronnie Curran	28	1	19+2	1	1	0	6	0
	MF	(Scotland) SCO	Jim Fagan	2	0	1+1	0	0	0	0	0
	MF	(Scotland) SCO	Johnny Graham	44	2	36	1	2	0	6	1
	MF	(Scotland) SCO	Bobby Johnstone	16	0	12	0	0	0	4	0
	MF	(Scotland) SCO	McAlister	1	0	1	0	0	0	0	0
	MF	(Scotland) SCO	Jackie McBride	1	0	1	0	0	0	0	0
	FW	(Scotland) SCO	Ian Boyd	31	9	29	9	2	0	0	0
	FW	(Scotland) SCO	Brogan	1	0	1	0	0	0	0	0
	FW	(Scotland) SCO	Hugh Brown	21	0	12+4	0	1	0	3+1	0
	FW	(Scotland) SCO	Bill Caldwell	1	0	1	0	0	0	0	0
	FW	(Scotland) SCO	Derek Currie	1	2	1	2	0	0	0	0
	FW	(Scotland) SCO	George Easton	31	3	23+2	2	2	0	4	1
	FW	(Scotland) SCO	Davie Hogg	2	0	2	0	0	0	0	0
	FW	(Scotland) SCO	Roy McCormack	43	26	35	19	2	2	6	5
	FW	(Scotland) SCO	Henry McCully	6	2	6	2	0	0	0	0
	FW	(Scotland) SCO	John McGhee	34	2	26+1	0	2	0	4+1	2
	FW	(Scotland) SCO	Mike McGowan	1	0	1	0	0	0	0	0
	FW	(Scotland) SCO	Alex McMichael	10	2	10	2	0	0	0	0
	FW	(Scotland) SCO	Savage	1	0	1	0	0	0	0	0
	FW	(Scotland) SCO	Jackie Stewart	2	0	1+1	0	0	0	0	0
	FW	(Scotland) SCO	Allan Watson	42	9	34	8	2	1	6	0
	FW	(Scotland) SCO	Michael Wynne	10	0	6+1	0	1	0	2	0
	FW	(Scotland) SCO	Bobby Young	1	0	1	0	0	0	0	0

=== Transfers ===
Amongst those players joining and leaving the club were the following:

==== Players in ====
Player	From	Date
(Scotland) George Easton	(Scotland) Arbroath	16 May 1968
(Scotland) Hugh Brown	(Scotland) Kilmarnock	16 Jul 1968
(Scotland) George Muir	(Scotland) Partick Thistle	16 Jul 1968
(Scotland) Ian Boyd	(Scotland) Pollok	5 Oct 1968
(Scotland) Len Campbell	(Scotland) Yoker Ath	30 Nov 1968
(Scotland) Alex McMichael	(Scotland) Bathgate Th	6 Mar 1969

==== Players out ====
Player	To	Date
(Scotland) Hugh Brown	(Scotland) Freed	30 Apr 1969
(Scotland) Ronnie Curran	(Scotland) Freed	30 Apr 1969
(Scotland) George Easton	(Scotland) Freed	30 Apr 1969
(Scotland) Bobby Johnstone	(Scotland) Freed	30 Apr 1969
(Scotland) Bill McMurray	(Scotland) Freed	30 Apr 1969
