= 1964–65 Dumbarton F.C. season =

Dumbarton
1964–1965 season
- Manager: Jackie Fearn / Willie Toner
- Stadium: Boghead Park, Dumbarton
- Scottish League Division 2: 14th
- Scottish Cup: First Round
- Scottish League Cup: Prelims
- Top goalscorer: League: Drew Nelson (17); All: Drew Nelson (17)

The 1964–65 season was the 81st football season in which Dumbarton competed at a Scottish national level, entering the Scottish Football League, the Scottish Cup and the Scottish League Cup. In addition Dumbarton competed in the Stirlingshire Cup.

== Scottish Second Division ==
Following a poor start to the league season, which saw only one win taken from the first five games, manager Jackie Fearn resigned, and by the time Willie Toner took over, the season was effectively over, as only another win and a draw had been taken from the subsequent seven matches. An unbeaten run of 8 games in November/December brought some cheer, but in the end only 14th place could be achieved, with 32 points, 27 behind champions Stirling Albion.

| 19 August 1964 Division 2 | Dumbarton | 0–1 | Stenhousemuir | Boghead Park |
| | | | Sibbald 34' | Attendance: 2,000; Referee: J Kelly |

| 1 September 1964 Division 2 | Dumbarton | 1–3 | Brechin City | Boghead Park |
| | McCulloch 16' | | Thoms 14'; Drummond 70' 80' | Attendance: 1,000; Referee: W Syme |

| 5 September 1964 Division 2 | ES Clydebank | 3–0 | Dumbarton | Kilbowie Park |
| | Kemp 15'; Coburn 35'; Roxburgh 37' | | | Attendance: 3,000; Referee: J McConville |

| 9 September 1964 Division 2 | Dumbarton | 2–1 | Ayr United | Boghead Park |
| | McGregor; McDonald 88' | | Muir 12' | Referee: P Paterson |

| 12 September 1964 Division 2 | Dumbarton | 0–4 | Hamilton | Boghead Park |
| | | | Forsyth 20', 41', 67', 78' | Attendance: 1,303; Referee: A McKenzie |

| 16 September 1964 Division 2 | Brechin City | 1–1 | Dumbarton | Glebe Park, Brechin |
| | Thoms 70' | | Reynolds 47' | Referee: M Watson |

| 19 September 1964 Division 2 | Ayr United | 3–0 | Dumbarton | Somerset Park |
| | Moore 52'; Gilshan 53'; Whittington 68' | | | Attendance: 1,500; Referee: W Elliot |

| 23 September 1964 Division 2 | Dumbarton | 1–3 | Queen of the South | Boghead Park |
| | Reynolds 87' | | Coates 30', 88'; Currie 70' | Referee: R Wilson |

| 26 September 1964 Division 2 | Dumbarton | 0–1 | Stirling Albion | Boghead Park |
| | | | Reid 59' | Attendance: 1,100; Referee: T Wharton |

| 30 September 1964 Division 2 | Queen of the South | 4–0 | Dumbarton | Palmerston Park |
| | Murphy (pen.) (pen.); Law |

| 3 October 1964 Division 2 | Stranraer | 4–1 | Dumbarton | Stair Park |
| | McMillan 7', 17'; Wallace 44'; McGill 63' | | Jardine 9' | Attendance: 1,000; Referee: D Weir |

| 10 October 1964 Division 2 | Dumbarton | 6–2 | Montrose | Boghead Park |
| | Logan 1', 8'; Brown 60', 84'; Corbett 72', 80' | | Jones 3', 47' | Attendance: 1,000; Referee: R Rodger |

| 17 October 1964 Division 2 | Alloa Athletic | 2–2 | Dumbarton | Recreation Park, Alloa |
| | Hume 7'; St John 17' | | McGuinness 8'; Baker 41' (o.g.) | Attendance: 500; Referee: A Kidd |

| 24 October 1964 Division 2 | Dumbarton | 1–3 | Forfar Athletic | Boghead Park |
| | Kelly 9' | | Dick 1', 19', 31' | Attendance: 1,000; Referee: J Hamilton |

| 7 November 1964 Division 2 | Dumbarton | 5–0 | East Fife | Boghead Park |
| | Nelson 9', 61', 80', 89'; Brown 40' | | | Attendance: 1,000; Referee: W Brittle |

| 14 November 1964 Division 2 | Queen's Park | 0–1 | Dumbarton | Hampden Park |
| | | | Nelson 90' | Attendance: 1,800; Referee: J Stewart |

| 21 November 1964 Division 2 | Dumbarton | 3–0 | Cowdenbeath | Boghead Park |
| | Nelson 14'; Halliday 50'; Reynolds 57' | | | Attendance: 1,350; Referee: R Wilson |

| 28 November 1964 Division 2 | Albion Rovers | 0–3 | Dumbarton | Cliftonhill Stadium |
| | | | Nelson 61', 70'; Halliday 65' | Attendance: 500; Referee: N Watson |

| 5 December 1964 Division 2 | Dumbarton | 4–4 | Berwick Rangers | Boghead Park |
| | Nelson 62', 84'; Reynolds 67'; Halliday 80' (pen.) | | Bowron 4'; Benvie 36'; Jackson 52'; Boyce 60' | Attendance: 1,500; Referee: E Weir |

| 12 December 1964 Division 2 | Raith Rovers | 0–3 | Dumbarton | Starks Park |
| | | | Veitch 64'; Nelson 73', 82' | Attendance: 1,000; Referee: J Callaghan |

| 19 December 1964 Division 2 | Dumbarton | 1–1 | Arbroath | Boghead Park |
| | Stirling 67' (o.g.) | | Donnelly 76' | Attendance: 1,700; Referee: J McConville |

| 1 January 1965 Division 2 | Dumbarton | 3–0 | ES Clydebank | Boghead Park |
| | Nelson 1'; Halliday 69' (pen.); Kelly 75' | | | Attendance: 4,000; Referee: RH Davidson |

| 2 January 1965 Division 2 | Hamilton | 5–0 | Dumbarton | Douglas Park |
| | Frye 46', 50'; Gilmour 53'; Forsyth 77', 82' | | | Attendance: 2,000; Referee: W Brittle |

| 9 January 1965 Division 2 | Dumbarton | 0–0 | Queens Park | Boghead Park |
| | | | | Attendance: 2,000; Referee: J Hamilton |

| 16 January 1965 Division 2 | Stirling Albion | 1–0 | Dumbarton | Annfield Stadium |
| | Smith 22' | | | Attendance: 3,000; Referee: M Phillips |

| 23 January 1965 Division 2 | Berwick Rangers | 3–2 | Dumbarton | Shielfield Park |
| | Boyce 11', 44', 85' | | McGuinness 24', 89' | Attendance: 803; Referee: R Davidson |

| 13 February 1965 Division 2 | Dumbarton | 3–1 | Alloa Athletic | Boghead Park |
| | Johnstone 23'; Nelson 24', 49' | | Walker 5' | Attendance: 1,000; Referee: D Weir |

| 20 February 1965 Division 2 | Dumbarton | 4–1 | Stranraer | Boghead Park |
| | Kelly 33', 35'; Reynolds 47'; Nelson 73' | | McMillan 22' | Attendance: 800; Referee: W Brittle |

| 27 February 1965 Division 2 | Forfar Athletic | 0–2 | Dumbarton | Station Park, Forfar |
| | | | Veitch 35'; Kelly 67' | Attendance: 800; Referee: A Kidd |

| 13 March 1965 Division 2 | East Fife | 3–1 | Dumbarton | Bayview Park, Methil |
| | Dewar 33', 53'; Walker 81' | | Kelly 9' | Attendance: 1,500; Referee: J Stewart |

| 27 March 1965 Division 2 | Cowdenbeath | 1–0 | Dumbarton | Central Park, Cowdenbeath |
| | Miller 50' | | | Attendance: 250; Referee: R Henderson |

| 3 April 1965 Division 2 | Dumbarton | 2–1 | Albion Rovers | Boghead Park |
| | Reynolds 67', 76' | | Sneddon 4' | Attendance: 1,030; Referee: T Wharton |

| 13 April 1965 Division 2 | Stenhousemuir | 4–0 | Dumbarton | Ochilview Park |
| | Dackers; Waters; Bryce | | | Referee: J Barclay |

| 17 April 1965 Division 2 | Dumbarton | 2–1 | Raith Rovers | Boghead Park |
| | Nelson 56'; Kelly 77' | | Lyall 30' | Attendance: 800; Referee: A McKenzie |

| 24 April 1965 Division 2 | Arbroath | 1–1 | Dumbarton | Gayfield Park |
| | Morrison 78' | | Camp 83' (o.g.) | Attendance: 995; Referee: N Watson |

| 27 April 1965 Division 2 | Montrose | 5–0 | Dumbarton | Links Park |
| | Kemp (8l), 67', 70'; Elliott 14', 63' | | | Attendance: 500; Referee: J Gordon |

== Scottish League Cup ==
In the League Cup, Dumbarton were on the losing side only once in their sectional ties, but too many draws meant that once again qualification for the knock out stages was not achieved.

| 8 August 1964 Group 8 | Morton | 1–1 | Dumbarton | Cappielow Park |
| | McGregor 90' | | Veitch 54' | Attendance: 15,000; Referee: T Wharton |

| 12 August 1964 Group 8 | Dumbarton | 3–2 | Berwick Rangers | Boghead Park |
| | Kelly 19', 54'; Brown 52' | | Williamson 6'; Dowd 24' | Attendance: 1,049; Referee: RH Davidson |

| 15 August 1964 Group 8 | Ayr United | 2–1 | Dumbarton | Somerset Park |
| | Whittington 1'; Nelson 71' | | Veitch 52' | Attendance: 3,000; Referee: J Wallace |

| 22 August 1964 Group 8 | Dumbarton | 1–1 | Morton | Boghead Park |
| | Foley 31' | | Bertelson 36' | Attendance: 6,500; Referee: A Kidd |

| 25 August 1964 Group 8 | Berwick Rangers | 0–0 | Dumbarton | Shielfield Park |

| 29 August 1964 Group 8 | Dumbarton | 2–1 | Ayr United | Boghead Park |
| | Kelly 11'; McCulloch 16' | | McMillan 86' | Attendance: 1,200; Referee: J Callaghan |

== Scottish Cup ==
In the Scottish Cup, Dumbarton fell to a first round defeat against Queen's Park, after a draw.

| 6 February 1965 Cup R1 | Dumbarton | 0–0 | Queen's Park | Boghead Park |
| | | | | Attendance: 3,200; Referee: J Hamilton |

| 10 February 1965 Cup R1r | Queen's Park | 2–1 | Dumbarton | Hampden Park |
| | Buchanan 15'; McKay 60' | | Johnstone 67' | Attendance: 3,459; Referee: J Hamilton |

== Stirlingshire Cup ==
Locally however, Dumbarton were to regain the Stirlingshire Cup for the third time, with a fine aggregate win over Division 1 opponents Falkirk.

| 15 March 1965 Semi Final | Dumbarton | 1–0 | Stenhousemuir | Boghead Park |
| | Johnstone |

| 19 April 1965 Final First Leg | Dumbarton | 1–1 | Falkirk | Boghead Park |
| | Harra | | McKinney |

| 22 April 1965 Final Second Leg | Falkirk | 1–3 (2–4 agg.) | Dumbarton | Brockville Park |
| | Halliday | | Harra; McLeary 40'; Veitch |

== Friendlies ==
| 27 October 1964 Friendly | Dumbarton | 8–1 | Royal Navy XI | Boghead Park |
| | Reynolds; Nelson | | Goal |

| 13 April 1965 Friendly | Dumbarton | 7–2 | Royal Navy XI | Boghead Park |
| | Goal | | Goal |

== Player statistics ==
=== Squad ===
| No. | Pos | Nat | Player | Total | | Second Division | | Scottish Cup | | League Cup | |
| No. | Pos | Nat | Player | Apps | Goals | Apps | Goals | Apps | Goals | Apps | Goals |
|---|---|---|---|---|---|---|---|---|---|---|---|
| | GK | (Scotland) SCO | Andy Crawford | 43 | 0 | 35 | 0 | 2 | 0 | 6 | 0 |
| | GK | (Scotland) SCO | Doug Robertson | 1 | 0 | 1 | 0 | 0 | 0 | 0 | 0 |
| | DF | (Scotland) SCO | John Fitzsimmons | 1 | 0 | 1 | 0 | 0 | 0 | 0 | 0 |
| | DF | (Scotland) SCO | Tommy Govan | 42 | 0 | 35 | 0 | 2 | 0 | 5 | 0 |
| | DF | (Scotland) SCO | Andy Jardine | 43 | 1 | 35 | 1 | 2 | 0 | 6 | 0 |
| | DF | (Scotland) SCO | Jim Lachlan | 7 | 0 | 2 | 0 | 0 | 0 | 5 | 0 |
| | MF | (Scotland) SCO | Eddie Boyle | 2 | 0 | 2 | 0 | 0 | 0 | 0 | 0 |
| | MF | (Scotland) SCO | Ronnie Curran | 39 | 0 | 31 | 0 | 2 | 0 | 6 | 0 |
| | MF | (Scotland) SCO | Hugh Harra | 14 | 0 | 12 | 0 | 0 | 0 | 2 | 0 |
| | MF | (Scotland) SCO | Bobby Johnstone | 22 | 2 | 20 | 1 | 2 | 1 | 0 | 0 |
| | MF | (Scotland) SCO | Hugh McCaffrey | 2 | 0 | 2 | 0 | 0 | 0 | 0 | 0 |
| | MF | (Scotland) SCO | Jimmy McGregor | 21 | 1 | 15 | 1 | 1 | 0 | 5 | 0 |
| | MF | (Scotland) SCO | Eddie Pearson | 2 | 0 | 2 | 0 | 0 | 0 | 0 | 0 |
| | MF | (Scotland) SCO | Jimmy Veitch | 39 | 3 | 32 | 1 | 2 | 0 | 5 | 2 |
| | MF | (Scotland) SCO | Joe Wilson | 1 | 0 | 1 | 0 | 0 | 0 | 0 | 0 |
| | FW | (Scotland) SCO | Mick Abbott | 1 | 0 | 1 | 0 | 0 | 0 | 0 | 0 |
| | FW | (Scotland) SCO | Tommy Brown | 17 | 4 | 13 | 3 | 1 | 0 | 3 | 1 |
| | FW | (Scotland) SCO | John Carey | 2 | 0 | 2 | 0 | 0 | 0 | 0 | 0 |
| | FW | (Scotland) SCO | Peter Corbett | 2 | 2 | 2 | 2 | 0 | 0 | 0 | 0 |
| | FW | (Scotland) SCO | Hugh Crainie | 1 | 0 | 1 | 0 | 0 | 0 | 0 | 0 |
| | FW | (Scotland) SCO | Derek Currie | 1 | 0 | 1 | 0 | 0 | 0 | 0 | 0 |
| | FW | (Scotland) SCO | Tommy Dunne | 3 | 0 | 3 | 0 | 0 | 0 | 0 | 0 |
| | FW | (Scotland) SCO | Pat Foley | 5 | 1 | 1 | 0 | 0 | 0 | 4 | 1 |
| | FW | (Scotland) SCO | Ron Gifford | 1 | 0 | 1 | 0 | 0 | 0 | 0 | 0 |
| | FW | (Scotland) SCO | Tommy Halliday | 23 | 4 | 21 | 4 | 2 | 0 | 0 | 0 |
| | FW | (Scotland) SCO | Billy Horn | 4 | 0 | 4 | 0 | 0 | 0 | 0 | 0 |
| | FW | (Scotland) SCO | John Kelly | 43 | 11 | 35 | 8 | 2 | 0 | 6 | 3 |
| | FW | (Scotland) SCO | James Kemp | 1 | 0 | 0 | 0 | 0 | 0 | 1 | 0 |
| | FW | (Scotland) SCO | Jim Kinsella | 1 | 0 | 1 | 0 | 0 | 0 | 0 | 0 |
| | FW | (Scotland) SCO | Neil Logan | 13 | 2 | 9 | 2 | 0 | 0 | 4 | 0 |
| | FW | (Scotland) SCO | Johnny Matthews | 1 | 0 | 1 | 0 | 0 | 0 | 0 | 0 |
| | FW | (Scotland) SCO | Johnny McCulloch | 10 | 2 | 7 | 1 | 0 | 0 | 3 | 1 |
| | FW | (Scotland) SCO | Jim McDonald | 1 | 1 | 1 | 1 | 0 | 0 | 0 | 0 |
| | FW | (Scotland) SCO | Dave McGuinness | 6 | 3 | 6 | 3 | 0 | 0 | 0 | 0 |
| | FW | (Scotland) SCO | Hector McKinlay | 4 | 0 | 3 | 0 | 0 | 0 | 1 | 0 |
| | FW | (Scotland) SCO | Robert McLeary | 2 | 0 | 2 | 0 | 0 | 0 | 0 | 0 |
| | FW | (Scotland) SCO | John McMichael | 1 | 0 | 1 | 0 | 0 | 0 | 0 | 0 |
| | FW | (Scotland) SCO | Drew Nelson | 27 | 17 | 24 | 17 | 2 | 0 | 1 | 0 |
| | FW | (Scotland) SCO | Bobby Peacock | 5 | 0 | 2 | 0 | 0 | 0 | 3 | 0 |
| | FW | (Scotland) SCO | Alex Reilly | 1 | 0 | 1 | 0 | 0 | 0 | 0 | 0 |
| | FW | (Scotland) SCO | Tommy Reynolds | 30 | 7 | 28 | 7 | 2 | 0 | 0 | 0 |
| | FW | (Scotland) SCO | Peter Traquair | 1 | 0 | 1 | 0 | 0 | 0 | 0 | 0 |

=== Transfers ===
Amongst those players joining and leaving the club were the following:

==== Players in ====
| Player | From | Date |
|---|---|---|
| (Scotland) Jimmy McGregor | (Scotland) Stirling Albion | 13 Jul 1964 |
| (Scotland) Tommy Reynolds | (Scotland) Irvine Meadow | 14 Sep 1964 |
| (Scotland) Drew Nelson | (Scotland) Ayr United | 2 Oct 1964 |
| (Scotland) Bobby Johnstone | (Scotland) Airdrie | 6 Nov 1964 |

==== Players out ====
| Player | To | Date |
|---|---|---|
| (Scotland) Don Bowie | (Scotland) Stirling Albion | 23 Jul 1964 |
| (Scotland) Alan Black | (England) Sunderland | 1 Aug 1964 |
| (Scotland) John Lawlor | (Scotland) Falkirk | 1 Aug 1964 |
| (Scotland) Jimmy McGregor | (Scotland) Freed | 30 Apr 1965 |
