= 1965–66 Dumbarton F.C. season =

Dumbarton
1965–1966 season
- Manager: Willie Toner
- Stadium: Boghead Park, Dumbarton
- Scottish League Division 2: 12th
- Scottish Cup: Third Round
- Scottish League Cup: Prelims
- Top goalscorer: League: Jimmy Veitch (11); All: Jim Lynas/ Jimmy Veitch (14)

The 1965–66 season was the 82nd football season in which Dumbarton competed at a Scottish national level, entering the Scottish Football League, the Scottish Cup and the Scottish League Cup. In addition Dumbarton competed in the Stirlingshire Cup.

== Scottish Second Division ==
An uncharacteristically successful start to the league season, with only one defeat in the first ten games, saw Dumbarton at the top of the league at the end of October, and even with a winless 'blip' in November, another string of five wins on the trot followed, meaning that hopes were still high in February for that illusive promotion place. However, only 3 wins were taken from the final 16 games, and Dumbarton finished in a disappointing 12th place, with 35 points, 18 behind champions Ayr United.

25 August 1965 Division 2	Dumbarton	1–3	Airdrie	Boghead Park
	Veitch 60' (pen.)		McMillan 1', 47'; Black 5'	Attendance: 1,912

8 September 1965 Division 2	Dumbarton	1–1	Berwick Rangers	Boghead Park
	Veitch 35'		Bowron	Attendance: 1,000; Referee: W rodgers

11 September 1965 Division 2	Third Lanark	0–2	Dumbarton	Cathkin Park
			McBeth 73'; Veitch 82'	Attendance: 2,000; Referee: W Anderson

15 September 1965 Division 2	Berwick Rangers	0–1	Dumbarton	Shielfield Park
			Nelson	Attendance: 1,334; Referee: D Smails

22 September 1965 Division 2	Dumbarton	2–0	Stranraer	Boghead Park
	Veitch 31' (pen.); McBeth 70'			Attendance: 1,000; Referee: J Callaghan

25 September 1965 Division 2	Brechin City	1–5	Dumbarton	Glebe Park, Brechin
	Harrier 29'		Veitch 30', 37'; Donnelly 40', 55'; McBeth 76'	Attendance: 800; Referee: R Henderson

29 September 1965 Division 2	Stranraer	1–1	Dumbarton	Boghead Park
	Wilson 62'		Veitch	Attendance: 950; Referee: J McConville

2 October 1965 Division 2	East Fife	0–1	Dumbarton	Boghead Park
			McBeth 41'	Attendance: 2,000; Referee: R Davidson

9 October 1965 Division 2	Stenhousemuir	1–1	Dumbarton	Ochilview Park
	Lumsden 57'		Veitch 56' (pen.)	Attendance: 1,000; Referee: A McKenzie

16 October 1965 Division 2	Dumbarton	3–1	East Stirling	Boghead Park
	Nelson 13'; Harra 21'; Craig 30' (o.g.)		Gerrard 36'	Attendance: 1,500; Referee: W Syme

30 October 1965 Division 2	Dumbarton	1–2	Arbroath	Boghead Park
	Johnstone 57'		Cant 55'; Donnelly 65'	Attendance: 1,500; Referee: J Kelly

6 November 1965 Division 2	Ayr United	2–0	Dumbarton	Somerset Park
	McAnespie 7'; Moore 38'			Attendance: 5,500; Referee: W Anderson

13 November 1965 Division 2	Dumbarton	0–0	Montrose	Boghead Park
				Attendance: 2,500; Referee: I Foote

27 November 1965 Division 2	Raith Rovers	4–0	Dumbarton	Starks Park
	Richardson 37'; Christie 40'; Lyall 42'; Porterfield 86' (pen.)			Attendance: 1,200; Referee: R Wilson

11 December 1965 Division 2	Queen of the South	3–3	Dumbarton	Palmerston Park
	Law 16'; Davidson 69'; Dick 81'		Johnstone 21', 60'; Veitch 26'	Attendance: 2,000; Referee: D Weir

18 December 1965 Division 2	Dumbarton	3–0	Alloa Athletic	Boghead Park
	Reynolds 23'; Miller 38'; Harra 89'			Attendance: 800; Referee: A Fleming

25 December 1965 Division 2	Cowdenbeath	1–2	Dumbarton	Central Park, Cowdenbeath
	Clark 43'		Lynas 52'; Reynolds 57'	Attendance: 750; Referee: W Elliot

3 January 1966 Division 2	Dumbarton	3–1	Third Lanark	Boghead Park
	Lynas 20'; Harra 50'; Veitch 80'		McLaughlin 83'	Attendance: 3,200; Referee: A McKenzie

15 January 1966 Division 2	Dumbarton	7–1	Brechin City	Boghead Park
	Miller 14'; Lynas 36', 53', 63'; Reynolds 52', 79'; McBeth 83'		Tocher 57'	Attendance: 1,000; Referee: W Syme

29 January 1966 Division 2	Dumbarton	5–2	Stenhousemuir	Boghead Park
	Lynas 2', 66', 73' (pen.); Cassells 15' (o.g.); Miller 28'		Lumsden 56'; Black 86'	Attendance: 1,000; Referee: J Paterson

12 February 1966 Division 2	East Stirling	3–1	Dumbarton	Firs Park
	Gerrard 30', 66'; Hamill 50'		McCall 87'	Attendance: 500; Referee: M Phillips

26 February 1966 Division 2	Arbroath	2–0	Dumbarton	Gayfield Park
	Jack 47', 66'			Attendance: 1,581; Referee: R Davidson

9 March 1966 Division 2	Dumbarton	2–3	Queens Park	Boghead Park
	Nelson 13'; McMahon 58'		Ingram 40', 83'; Hopper 82'	Referee: J Stewart

12 March 1966 Division 2	Montrose	2–1	Dumbarton	Gayfield Park
	Thomson 33'; Wallace 65'		Nelson 6'	Attendance: 500; Referee: J Barclay

19 March 1966 Division 2	Dumbarton	2–0	Albion Rovers	Boghead Park
	Nelson 14', 84'			Attendance: 500; Referee: A Fleming

23 March 1966 Division 2	Airdrie	3–1	Dumbarton	Broomfield Park
	Murray 41'; Marshall; Govan (o.g.)		McBeth 80'	Referee: T Wharton

26 March 1966 Division 2	Dumbarton	0–2	Raith Rovers	Boghead Park
			Porterfield	Attendance: 700; Referee: A Crawley

30 March 1966 Division 2	Dumbarton	1–3	Ayr United	Boghead Park
	Muir 26'		Paterson 65'; Nelson 80' (o.g.); McMillan 85'	Referee: W Syme

5 April 1966 Division 2	Queens Park	2–3	Dumbarton	Hampden Park
	Mulgrew 61'; Campbell 80'		Nelson 9'; Veitch 32'; Lynas 34'	Attendance: 200; Referee: J Callaghan

9 April 1966 Division 2	Forfar Athletic	2–2	Dumbarton	Station Park, Forfar
	Mackie 14'; Newlands 31'		Potter 1' (o.g.); Miller 30'	Attendance: 485; Referee: N Watson

16 April 1966 Division 2	Dumbarton	4–1	Queen of the South	Boghead Park
	McBeth 2'; Nelson 28', 65'; McLeary 43'		Smith 50'	Attendance: 800; Referee: T Wharton

20 April 1966 Division 2	East Fife	6–1	Dumbarton	Bayview Park, Methil
	Watt 5'; Thoms 18', 69'; Christie 44', 75', 77'		McBeth 79'	Attendance: 1,000; Referee: E Thomson

23 April 1966 Division 2	Alloa Athletic	1–0	Dumbarton	Recreation Park, Alloa
	Rutherford 40'			Attendance: 300; Referee: J Callaghan

25 April 1966 Division 2	Dumbarton	1–3	Forfar Athletic	Boghead Park
	McCall 88'		Mackie 33'; Parks 47'; Johnstone 69' (o.g.)	Attendance: 300; Referee: J Hamilton

27 April 1966 Division 2	Albion Rovers	0–0	Dumbarton	Cliftonhill Stadium

30 April 1966 Division 2	Dumbarton	2–4	Cowdenbeath	Boghead Park
	Lynas 12'; Muir 22'		Sugden 20'; Miller 52'; Trialist 67'; Rowland 71'	Attendance: 250; Referee: R Davidson

== Scottish League Cup ==
In the League Cup, Dumbarton maintained a 100% record at home in their sectional ties, but the three away defeats ensured no further progress to the knock out stages.

14 August 1965 Group 8	Dumbarton	2–1	East Stirling	Boghead Park
	Harra 60'; Muir 68'		Jones 77'	Attendance: 1,500; Referee: J McConville

18 August 1965 Group 8	East Fife	3–2	Dumbarton	Bayview Park, Methil
	Dewar 1'; Watt 12'; Walker 55' (pen.)		Curran 84', 88'	Attendance: 3,000; Referee: W Mullen

21 August 1965 Group 8	Alloa Athletic	2–1	Dumbarton	Recreation Park, Alloa
	Hodge, A 8', 77'		Nelson 41'	Attendance: 700; Referee: W Elliot

28 August 1965 Group 8	East Stirling	1–0	Dumbarton	Firs Park
	Smith 36'			Attendance: 250; Referee: J Hamilton

1 September 1965 Group 8	Dumbarton	6–1	East Fife	Boghead Park
	Veitch 2', 84'; Booth 15' (o.g.); McBeth 46'; Johnstone 59'; McCall 66'		Dewar 72'	Attendance: 1,300; Referee: J Paterson

4 September 1965 Group 8	Dumbarton	4–1	Alloa Athletic	Boghead Park
	McBeth 11', 80'; Nelson 42'; McCall 60'		Keddie 46'	Attendance: 1,000; Referee: I Foote

== Scottish Cup ==
In the Scottish Cup, Dumbarton required to fight through two preliminary rounds, before disposing of Montrose and then Queen of the South. Aberdeen however were too tough a 'nut to crack' in the third round.

8 January 1966 Cup P1	Dumbarton	2–2	Peebles Rovers	Boghead Park
	Lynas 13', 74'		Fraser 22'; Cowie 50'	Attendance: 2,000; Referee: R Wilson

12 January 1966 Cup P1r	Peebles Rovers	2–3 (a.e.t.)	Dumbarton	Peebles
	Steele 77'; Ewing 78'		Lynas 40'; McBeth 69'; Reynolds 92'	Attendance: 300; Referee: R Wilson

22 January 1966 Cup P2	Glasgow University	1–2	Dumbarton	Glasgow
	Scott 85'		Nelson 25'; Lynas 80'	Attendance: 2,187; Referee: A McKenzie

9 February 1966 Cup R1	Dumbarton	2–1	Montrose	Boghead Park
	Johnstone 17'; Harra 44'		Thomson 60'	Attendance: 3,050; Referee: W Anderson

23 February 1966 Cup R2	Dumbarton	1–0	Queen of the South	Boghead Park
	McCall 61'			Attendance: 5,000; Referee: W Syme

5 March 1966 Cup R3	Dumbarton	0–3	Aberdeen	Boghead Park
			Wilson 29'; Little 70'; Winchetser 77'	Attendance: 9,800; Referee: W Mullan

== Stirlingshire Cup ==
Locally, Dumbarton were unlucky in their attempt to retain the Stirlingshire Cup. A first round replay win over Division 1 opponents Falkirk was followed by a draw in the semi-final against Alloa Athletic. However the tie was decided by the toss of a coin - which Dumbarton lost.

26 October 1965 First Round	Dumbarton	0–0	Falkirk	Boghead Park

11 April 1966 First Round replay	Falkirk	2–4	Dumbarton	Brockville Park
	Houston 11'; Smith 21'		Nelson 6'; Harra 62'; Muir 65'; Veitch (pen.)	Attendance: 350; Referee: W Syme

18 April 1966 Semi-final	Alloa Athletic	0–0	Dumbarton	Recreation Park, Alloa
				Referee: A Crawley

== Friendlies ==
18 September 1965 Friendly	Dumbarton	1–3	Partick Thistle	Boghead Park
	McLeary		Goal

22 December 1965 Friendly	Dumbarton	3–1	Renton	Boghead Park
	Goal		Goal

== Player statistics ==
=== Squad ===
No.	Pos	Nat	Player	Total		Second Division		Scottish Cup		League Cup	
No.	Pos	Nat	Player	Apps	Goals	Apps	Goals	Apps	Goals	Apps	Goals
	GK	(Scotland) SCO	Andy Crawford	30	0	22	0	4	0	4	0
	GK	(Scotland) SCO	Maurice Dunne	18	0	14	0	2	0	2	0
	DF	(Scotland) SCO	Joe Bryers	1	0	1	0	0	0	0	0
	DF	(Scotland) SCO	Tommy Govan	34	0	24	0	5	0	5	0
	DF	(Scotland) SCO	Andy Jardine	35	0	26	0	4	0	5	0
	MF	(Scotland) SCO	Ronnie Curran	42	2	30	0	6	0	6	2
	MF	(Scotland) SCO	Hugh Harra	36	5	27	3	6	1	3	1
	MF	(Scotland) SCO	Bobby Johnstone	44	5	32	3	6	1	6	1
	MF	(Scotland) SCO	Jimmy Veitch	36	13	29	11	3	0	4	2
	FW	(Scotland) SCO	Eddie Donnelly	9	2	6	2	0	0	3	0
	FW	(Scotland) SCO	Alec Frew	3	0	3	0	0	0	0	0
	FW	(Scotland) SCO	John Kelly	30	0	23	0	1	0	6	0
	FW	(Scotland) SCO	Jim Lynas	25	14	19	10	6	4	0	0
	FW	(Scotland) SCO	Andy McBeth	28	12	21	8	4	1	3	3
	FW	(Scotland) SCO	John McCall	28	5	21	2	3	1	4	2
	FW	(Scotland) SCO	Robert McLeary	11	1	9	1	0	0	2	0
	FW	(Scotland) SCO	Hugh McMahon	4	1	4	1	0	0	0	0
	FW	(Scotland) SCO	Ally Miller	26	4	21	4	5	0	0	0
	FW	(Scotland) SCO	Billy Muir	26	3	18	2	2	0	6	1
	FW	(Scotland) SCO	Drew Nelson	46	12	35	9	6	1	5	2
	FW	(Scotland) SCO	Tommy Reynolds	16	5	11	4	3	1	2	0

=== Transfers ===
Amongst those players joining and leaving the club were the following

==== Players in ====
Player	From	Date
(Scotland) Andy McBeth	(Scotland) Morton	26 Jun 1965
(Scotland) John McCall	(Scotland) Airdrie	1 Jul 1965
(Scotland) Billy Muir	(Scotland) Ayr United	12 Aug 1965
(Scotland) Maurice Dunne	(Scotland) Our Lady's HS	31 Aug 1965
(Scotland) Hugh McMahon	(Scotland) Kirkintilloch Rob Roy	2 Oct 1965
(Scotland) Ally Miller	(Scotland) Berwick Rangers	29 Oct 1965
(Scotland) Jim Lynas	(Scotland) Blantyre Victoria	14 Jan 1966

==== Players out ====
Player	To	Date
(Scotland) Tommy Halliday	(Scotland) Morton	17 May 1965
(Scotland) John McCall	(Scotland) Freed	30 Apr 1966
(Scotland) Ally Miller	(Scotland) Freed	30 Apr 1966
(Scotland) Billy Muir	(Scotland) Freed	30 Apr 1966
(Scotland) Tommy Reynolds	(Scotland) Freed	30 Apr 1966
(Scotland) Doug Robertson	(Scotland) Retired	
