= 1963–64 Ipswich Town F.C. season =

Ipswich Town
1963–64 season
- Chairman: John Cobbold
- Manager: Jackie Milburn
- Stadium: Portman Road
- Football League First Division: 22nd (relegated)
- League Cup: Second round
- FA Cup: Fourth round
- Top goalscorer: League: Gerry Baker (15); All: Gerry Baker (18)
- Highest home attendance: 28,113 v Manchester United (Division One, 3 September 1963)
- Lowest home attendance: 8,568 v Walsall (League Cup second round, 25 September 1964)
- Average home league attendance: 16,004
Home colours

During the 1963–64 English football season, Ipswich Town F.C. competed in the Football League First Division. Just two years after being crowned champions of England, they finished bottom of the table and were relegated to the Second Division, setting several unwelcome club records along the way.

== Season summary ==
After beating Burnley on the opening day of the season, Ipswich went 23 league and cup matches before registering their next win, the longest winless sequence in the club's history. A 10–1 drubbing at Fulham on Boxing Day remains Ipswich's heaviest ever defeat, though the nine-goal margin was equalled in 1995 when they lost 9–0 to Manchester United in the Premier League. They ended the campaign having shipped 121 league goals, the highest total ever conceded by Ipswich in a single season. In addition to the Fulham debacle, they lost 9–1 at Stoke City and were hit for six goals or more in a further five matches.

The season saw the departure from Portman Road of the club's regular strike partnership of Ray Crawford and Ted Phillips. Crawford signed for Wolverhampton Wanderers in September 1963 (although he would return to Ipswich for a second spell two years later) and Phillips joined Leyton Orient in March 1964. John Compton (to Bournemouth and Boscombe Athletic) and Doug Moran (to Dundee United) would also move on before the start of the following season as manager Jackie Milburn began to break up Alf Ramsey's title-winning team.

One of the season's few bright spots was the goalscoring of American-born Gerry Baker, older brother of Arsenal and England forward Joe Baker. Signed by Milburn for £25,000 from Hibernian in December 1963, Baker netted 18 times in 22 matches (including three hat-tricks) to finish the season as the club's leading scorer.

== Kit ==
Ipswich's kit was almost identical to the one worn the previous season. Although there were no changes to the shirt, blue side panels were added to the shorts, and the socks changed from blue and white hoops to plain white with blue turnovers.

== Squad ==
Players who made one appearance or more for Ipswich Town F.C. during the 1963–64 season

Pos.	Nat.	Name	League		FA Cup		League Cup		Total	
Pos.	Nat.	Name	Apps	Goals	Apps	Goals	Apps	Goals	Apps	Goals
GK	ENG	Roy Bailey	27	0	3	0	2	0	32	0
GK	ENG	Dave Bevis	5	0	0	0	0	0	5	0
GK	SCO	Jim Thorburn	10	0	0	0	0	0	10	0
DF	SCO	Billy Baxter	42	5	3	1	2	0	47	6
DF	SCO	Jack Bolton	32	0	3	0	1	0	36	0
DF	ENG	Larry Carberry	10	0	0	0	2	0	12	0
DF	ENG	John Compton	35	0	3	0	1	0	39	0
DF	SCO	Joe Davin	26	0	3	0	0	0	29	0
DF	SCO	George Dougan	16	0	1	0	2	0	19	0
DF	ENG	Andy Nelson	26	0	2	0	1	0	29	0
MF	SCO	Bobby Blackwood	28	7	3	0	1	0	32	7
MF	ENG	Joe Broadfoot	29	4	3	1	0	0	32	5
MF	WAL	John Elsworthy	23	1	0	0	0	0	23	1
MF	NIR	Danny Hegan	21	5	3	2	1	0	25	7
MF	SCO	Jimmy Leadbetter	17	1	2	0	1	0	20	1
MF	ENG	Roy Stephenson	22	0	0	0	2	0	24	0
MF	ENG	Dennis Thrower	1	0	0	0	1	0	2	0
FW	USA	Gerry Baker	20	15	2	3	0	0	22	18
FW	ENG	John Colrain	15	3	0	0	2	0	17	3
FW	ENG	Ray Crawford	6	2	0	0	0	0	6	2
FW	SCO	Doug Moran	30	8	2	0	2	0	34	8
FW	ENG	Ted Phillips	20	4	0	0	1	0	21	4
FW	SCO	Frank Treacy	1	0	0	0	0	0	1	0

== League standings ==
Pos	Team	Pld	W	D	L	GF	GA	GAv	Pts	Qualification or relegation
18	Blackpool	42	13	9	20	52	73	0.712	35	
19	Aston Villa	42	11	12	19	62	71	0.873	34	
20	Birmingham City	42	11	7	24	54	92	0.587	29	
21	Bolton Wanderers (R)	42	10	8	24	48	80	0.600	28	Relegation to the Second Division
22	Ipswich Town (R)	42	9	7	26	56	121	0.463	25	Relegation to the Second Division

Source: World Football
Rules for classification: 1) Points; 2) Goal average; 3) Goals scored
(R) Relegated

== Results ==
Home team listed first

=== Division One ===
24 August 1963 1	Ipswich Town	3–1	Burnley	Ipswich
	Crawford 26' 34'; Moran 79'		Miller 68'	Stadium: Portman Road; Attendance: 23,000

28 August 1963 2	Manchester United	2–0	Ipswich Town	Manchester
	Law 55' 83'			Stadium: Old Trafford; Attendance: 39,921

30 August 1963 3	West Ham United	2–2	Ipswich Town	London
	Byrne 38'; Boyce 64'		Baxter 57'; Phillips 77'	Stadium: Upton Park; Attendance: 27,599

3 September 1963 4	Ipswich Town	2–7	Manchester United	Ipswich
	Moran 47' 64'		Sadler 6'; Law 34' 61' (pen.) 85'; Setters 40'; Moir 59'; Chisnall 67'	Stadium: Portman Road; Attendance: 28,113

7 September 1963 5	Sheffield Wednesday	3–1	Ipswich Town	Sheffield
	Layne 1'; Fantham 40'; McAnearney 80' (pen.)		Phillips 73'	Stadium: Hillsborough; Attendance: 18,198

14 September 1963 6	Ipswich Town	0–0	Everton	Ipswich
				Stadium: Portman Road; Attendance: 20,099

18 September 1963 7	Bolton Wanderers	6–0	Ipswich Town	Bolton
	Lennard 6' 88'; Davies 16' 79'; Pilkington 31'; Taylor 65'			Stadium: Burnden Park; Attendance: 12,917

21 September 1963 8	Birmingham City	1–0	Ipswich Town	Birmingham
	Beard 43'			Stadium: St Andrew's; Attendance: 19,095

28 September 1963 9	Ipswich Town	1–2	West Bromwich Albion	Ipswich
	Moran 18'		Brown 49'; Clark 72'	Stadium: Portman Road; Attendance: 13,859

1 October 1963 10	Ipswich Town	1–3	Bolton Wanderers	Ipswich
	Colrain 80'		Butler 58'; Taylor 70' 86'	Stadium: Portman Road; Attendance: 11,363

5 October 1963 11	Arsenal	6–0	Ipswich Town	London
	MacLeod 13'; Baker 53' 73'; Strong 57' 58' 63'			Stadium: Highbury; Attendance: 31,803

9 October 1963 12	Sheffield United	3–1	Ipswich Town	Sheffield
	Docherty 8' 59'; Simpson 44'		Moran 4'	Stadium: Bramall Lane; Attendance: 18,946

12 October 1963 13	Ipswich Town	1–3	Chelsea	Ipswich
	Moran 12'		Tambling 5' 43'; Venables 30' (pen.)	Stadium: Portman Road; Attendance: 15,703

19 October 1963 14	Blackpool	2–2	Ipswich Town	Blackpool
	Parry 18'; Charnley 43'		Baxter 46'; Hegan 63'	Stadium: Bloomfield Road; Attendance: 14,666

26 October 1963 15	Ipswich Town	1–2	Liverpool	Ipswich
	Hegan 9'		Melia 7'; Hunt 43'	Stadium: Portman Road; Attendance: 16,322

2 November 1963 16	Nottingham Forest	3–1	Ipswich Town	Nottingham
	Quigley 33'; Bevis 47' (o.g.); Vowden 83'		Hegan 43'	Stadium: City Ground; Attendance: 21,109

9 November 1963 17	Ipswich Town	0–2	Stoke City	Ipswich
			Ritchie 38'; Dobing 57'	Stadium: Portman Road; Attendance: 15,013

16 November 1963 18	Wolverhampton Wanderers	2–1	Ipswich Town	Wolverhampton
	Crawford 60'; Knowles 84'		Phillips 70'	Stadium: Molineux; Attendance: 17,891

23 November 1963 19	Ipswich Town	2–3	Tottenham Hotspur	Ipswich
	Phillips 10'; Elsworthy 78'		Marchi 27'; Dyson 36' 61'	Stadium: Portman Road; Attendance: 25,014

30 November 1963 20	Aston Villa	0–0	Ipswich Town	Birmingham
				Stadium: Villa Park; Attendance: 16,353

7 December 1963 21	Ipswich Town	0–0	Blackburn Rovers	Ipswich
				Stadium: Portman Road; Attendance: 15,500

14 December 1963 22	Burnley	3–1	Ipswich Town	Burnley
	Morgan 4'; Miller 20' 82'		Baker 44'	Stadium: Turf Moor; Attendance: 10,558

20 December 1963 23	Ipswich Town	3–2	West Ham United	Ipswich
	Blackwood 62'; Moran 67'; Baker 76'		Byrne 37' (pen.); Brabrook 57'	Stadium: Portman Road; Attendance: 11,730

26 December 1963 24	Fulham	10–1	Ipswich Town	London
	Cook 15'; Leggat 17' 18' 20' 89'; Howfield 42' 48' 72'; Robson 63'; Mullery 85'		Baker 44'	Stadium: Craven Cottage; Attendance: 19,374

28 December 1963 25	Ipswich Town	4–2	Fulham	Ipswich
	Baxter 11'; Hegan 44'; Broadfoot 80'; Baker 84'		Leggat 40'; Key 62'	Stadium: Portman Road; Attendance: 15,808

11 January 1964 26	Ipswich Town	1–4	Sheffield Wednesday	Ipswich
	Baker 7'		Layne 19' 23' 86'; Dobson 75'	Stadium: Portman Road; Attendance: 15,199

18 January 1964 27	Everton	1–1	Ipswich Town	Liverpool
	Scott 78' (pen.)		Blackwood 43'	Stadium: Goodison Park; Attendance: 38,242

1 February 1964 28	Ipswich Town	3–2	Birmingham City	Ipswich
	Hegan 7'; Blackwood 65' 68'		Regan 11'; Farmer 66'	Stadium: Portman Road; Attendance: 13,349

8 February 1964 29	West Bromwich Albion	2–1	Ipswich Town	West Bromwich
	Kaye 34'; Fenton 66'		Blackwood 5'	Stadium: The Hawthorns; Attendance: 13,746

18 February 1964 30	Ipswich Town	1–2	Arsenal	Ipswich
	Baker 16'		Eastham 45' (pen.); Baxter 79' (o.g.)	Stadium: Portman Road; Attendance: 17,486

22 February 1964 31	Chelsea	4–0	Ipswich Town	London
	Murray 3'; Bridges 16' 84'; Tambling 79'			Stadium: Stamford Bridge; Attendance: 20,703

29 February 1964 32	Ipswich Town	1–0	Sheffield United	Ipswich
	Baxter 44'			Stadium: Portman Road; Attendance: 11,465

7 March 1964 33	Liverpool	6–0	Ipswich Town	Liverpool
	St John 41'; Hunt 49' 72'; Arrowsmith 55' 83'; Thompson 70'			Stadium: Anfield; Attendance: 35,575

21 March 1964 34	Stoke City	9–1	Ipswich Town	Stoke-on-Trent
	Viollet 2' 43' 50'; Dobing 4'; McIlroy 20' 79'; Ritchie 51' 67'; Bebbington 90'		Broadfoot 19'	Stadium: Victoria Ground; Attendance: 16,135

28 March 1964 35	Ipswich Town	4–3	Nottingham Forest	Ipswich
	Leadbetter 13'; Blackwood 40' 68'; Colrain 58'		Wignall 28'; Storey-Moore 38' 57'	Stadium: Portman Road; Attendance: 12,017

30 March 1964 36	Ipswich Town	1–1	Leicester City	Ipswich
	Colrain 88'		Goodfellow 30'	Stadium: Portman Road; Attendance: 16,265

31 March 1964 37	Leicester City	2–1	Ipswich Town	Leicester
	Stringfellow 31'; Keyworth 44'		Baker 28'	Stadium: Filbert Street; Attendance: 15,925

4 April 1964 38	Tottenham Hotspur	6–3	Ipswich Town	London
	White 13' 23'; Jones 22' 54' 77'; Robertson 41'		Baker 20' 55' 61'	Stadium: White Hart Lane; Attendance: 25,115

11 April 1964 39	Ipswich Town	4–3	Aston Villa	Ipswich
	Broadfoot 23' 76'; Baker 69'; Baxter 89'		Pountney 32' 79'; Wylie 61'	Stadium: Portman Road; Attendance: 11,658

14 April 1964 40	Ipswich Town	1–0	Wolverhampton Wanderers	Ipswich
	Baker 57'			Stadium: Portman Road; Attendance: 15,928

18 April 1964 41	Blackburn Rovers	3–1	Ipswich Town	Blackburn
	England 27'; Harrison 39'; Jones 40'		Moran 3'	Stadium: Ewood Park; Attendance: 10,341

25 April 1964 42	Ipswich Town	4–3	Blackpool	Ipswich
	Baker 11' 43' 57'; Gratrix 80' (o.g.)		Ball 63' 86'; Lea 90'	Stadium: Portman Road; Attendance: 11,187

=== League Cup ===
25 September 1963 R2	Ipswich Town	0–0	Walsall	Ipswich
				Stadium: Portman Road; Attendance: 8568

3 October 1963 R2 Replay	Walsall	1–0	Ipswich Town	Walsall
	Newton 26'			Stadium: Fellows Park; Attendance: 6632

=== FA Cup ===
4 January 1964 R3	Ipswich Town	6–3	Oldham Athletic	Ipswich
	Broadfoot 3'; Hegan 22' 68'; Baker 24' 35' 43'		Lister 34' 44'; Bowie 84'	Stadium: Portman Road; Attendance: 15,304

25 January 1964 R4	Ipswich Town	1–1	Stoke City	Ipswich
	Baxter 68'		McIlroy 37'	Stadium: Portman Road; Attendance: 21,949

29 January 1964 R4 Replay	Stoke City	1–0	Ipswich Town	Stoke-on-Trent
	McIlroy 65'			Stadium: Victoria Ground; Attendance: 26,803
