= George Muir =

George Muir may refer to:

- George Muir (politician) (1903–1970), member of the Canadian House of Commons from 1957 to 1970
- George Muir (Australian footballer) (1896–1959), played Australian football in the 1910s with the Fitzroy and Carlton clubs
- George Harvey Muir (1869–1939), English footballer for Southampton F.C., later becoming a director
- George Muir (field hockey) (born 1994), New Zealand field hockey player
- George Muir (footballer, born 1937) (1937–2008), Scottish footballer for Hibernians and Yeovil Town
- George Muir (footballer, born 1940) (1940–1999), Scottish footballer for Partick Thistle and Dumbarton
