= Ian Young (footballer) =

Scottish footballer (1943–2019)

Personal information
- Full name: John Muir Young
- Date of birth: 21 May 1943
- Place of birth: Neilston, Scotland
- Date of death: 11 December 2019 (aged 76)
- Place of death: Neilston, Scotland
- Positions: Centre half; right back

Youth career
- Neilston Waverley

Senior career*
Years	Team	Apps	(Gls)
1961–1968	Celtic	101	(2)
1968–1970	St Mirren	24	(0)
Total		108	(2)

International career
1965	Scotland U23	1	(0)
- * Club domestic league appearances and goals

John Muir "Ian" Young (21 May 1943 – 11 December 2019) was a Scottish footballer who played for Celtic and St Mirren.

== Career ==
Young signed for Celtic from Neilston Waverly in June 1961. He played 145 games for the club in major competitions, scoring three times, and won the Scottish Cup in 1965 and the Scottish Football League Championship in 1965–66. Also among these appearances were 19 in European competition, including both legs of the European Cup Winners' Cup semi-final against MTK Budapest in 1964, and both legs of the semi-final of the same competition against Liverpool in 1966. He lost his place soon afterwards to the more attacking Jim Craig.

Young signed for St Mirren in the summer of 1968, where he played for a further two years, but his career ended at the age of 27 from a serious knee injury.

Young was capped once at Under-23 level for Scotland, playing at Aberdeen's Pittodrie Stadium in a 0–0 draw against England in February 1965.

== Honours ==
Celtic

- Scottish League Champions: 1965–66
- Scottish Cup: 1964–65
- Scottish League Cup: 1965–66
  - Runner-up 1964–65
