= 1964–65 Scottish Cup =

Tournament details
- Country: Scotland

Final positions
- Champions: Celtic
- Runners-up: Dunfermline Athletic

The 1964–65 Scottish Cup was the 80th staging of Scotland's most prestigious football knockout competition. The Cup was won by Celtic who defeated Dunfermline Athletic in the final.

== Preliminary round 1 ==
Home team	Score	Away team
Berwick Rangers (2)	2 – 2	Stenhousemuir (2)
Brechin City (2)	3 – 4	Albion Rovers (2)
Coldstream (NL)	2 – 4	Stranraer (2)
Hamilton Academical (2)	5 – 3	Clachnacuddin (HL)
Peebles Rovers (NL)	1 – 4	Stirling Albion (2)

=== Replays ===
Home team	Score	Away team
Stenhousemuir	1 – 0	Berwick Rangers

== Preliminary round 2 ==
Home team	Score	Away team
Stenhousemuir (2)	4 – 1	Elgin City (HL)
Edinburgh University (NL)	1 – 4	Forfar Athletic (2)
Cowdenbeath (2)	2 – 1	Alloa Athletic (2)
Hamilton Academical (2)	3 – 0	Stranraer (2)
Inverness Caledonian (HL)	2 – 1	Raith Rovers (2)
Keith (HL)	1 – 1	Ayr United (2)
Queen's Park (2)	0 – 0	Albion Rovers (2)
Vale of Leithen (NL)	0 – 5	Stirling Albion (2)

=== Replays ===
Home team	Score	Away team
Albion Rovers	1 – 1	Queen's Park
Ayr United	4 – 2	Keith

==== Second Replays ====
Home team	Score	Away team
Queen's Park	1 – 0	Albion Rovers

== First round ==
Home team	Score	Away team
Motherwell (1)	3 – 2	Stenhousemuir (2)
Airdrieonians (1)	7 – 3	Montrose (2)
Aberdeen (1)	0 – 0	East Fife (2)
Ayr United (2)	1 – 1	Partick Thistle (1)
Clyde (1)	0 – 4	Greenock Morton (1)
Dumbarton (2)	0 – 0	Queen's Park (2)
Falkirk (1)	0 – 3	Hearts (1)
Forfar Athletic (2)	0 – 3	Dundee United (1)
Hibernian (1)	1 – 1	ES Clydebank (2)
Inverness Caledonian (HL)	1 – 5	Third Lanark (1)
Kilmarnock (1)	5 – 0	Cowdenbeath (2)
Queen of the South (2)	0 – 2	Dunfermline Athletic (1)
Rangers (1)	3 – 0	Hamilton Academical (2)
St Johnstone (1)	1 – 0	Dundee (1)
St Mirren (1)	0 – 3	Celtic (1)
Stirling Albion (2)	2 – 1	Arbroath (2)

=== Replays ===
Home team	Score	Away team
ES Clydebank (2)	0 – 2	Hibernian (1)
East Fife (2)	1 – 0	Aberdeen (1)
Partick Thistle (1)	7 – 1	Ayr United (2)
Queen's Park (2)	2 – 1	Dumbarton (2)

== Second round ==
Home team	Score	Away team
Dundee United	0 – 2	Rangers
East Fife	0 – 0	Kilmarnock
Hibernian	5 – 1	Partick Thistle
Greenock Morton	3 – 3	Hearts
Motherwell	1 – 0	St Johnstone
Queen's Park	0 – 1	Celtic
Stirling Albion	1 – 1	Airdrieonians
Third Lanark	1 – 1	Dunfermline Athletic

=== Replays ===
Home team	Score	Away team
Airdrieonians	0 – 2	Stirling Albion
Dunfermline Athletic	2 – 2	Third Lanark
Hearts	2 – 0	Greenock Morton
Kilmarnock	3 – 0	East Fife

==== Second Replays ====
Home team	Score	Away team
Dunfermline Athletic	4 – 2	Third Lanark

== Quarter-finals ==
Home team	Score	Away team
Celtic	3 – 2	Kilmarnock
Dunfermline Athletic	2 – 0	Stirling Albion
Hibernian	2 – 1	Rangers
Motherwell	1 – 0	Hearts

== Semi-finals ==
27 March 1965

Celtic	2 – 2	Motherwell

Hampden Park, Glasgow
Attendance: 52,000

27 March 1965

Dunfermline Athletic	2 – 0	Hibernian

Tynecastle Park, Edinburgh
Attendance: 33,305

=== Replays ===
31 March 1965

Celtic	3 – 0	Motherwell

Hampden Park, Glasgow
Attendance: 58,959

== Final ==
24 April 1965

Celtic	3 – 2	Dunfermline Athletic
Auld; McNeill		Melrose; McLaughlin

Hampden Park, Glasgow
Attendance: 108,800
Referee: Hugh Phillips

=== Teams ===
CELTIC:
GK	(Scotland) John Fallon
RB	(Scotland) Ian Young
LB	(Scotland) Tommy Gemmell
RH	(Scotland) Bobby Murdoch
CH	(Scotland) Billy McNeill (c)
LH	(Scotland) John Clark
RW	(Scotland) Stevie Chalmers
IR	(Scotland) Charlie Gallagher
CF	(Scotland) John Hughes
IL	(Scotland) Bobby Lennox
LW	(Scotland) Bertie Auld
Manager:
(Scotland) Jock Stein

DUNFERMLINE ATHLETIC:
GK	(Scotland) Jim Herriot
RB	(Scotland) Willie Callaghan
LB	(Scotland) John Lunn
RH	(Scotland) Jim Thomson
CH	(Scotland) Jim MacLean (c)
LH	(Scotland) Tommy Callaghan
RW	(Scotland) Alex Edwards
IR	(Scotland) Alex Smith
CF	(Scotland) John McLaughlin
IL	(Scotland) Harry Melrose
LW	(Scotland) Jackie Sinclair
Manager:
(Northern Ireland) Willie Cunningham

== See also ==
- 1964–65 in Scottish football
- 1964–65 Scottish League Cup
