= John Colrain =

Scottish footballer and manager

Personal information
- Full name: John James Colrain
- Date of birth: 4 February 1937
- Place of birth: Glasgow, Scotland
- Date of death: 14 July 1984 (aged 47)
- Place of death: Glasgow, Scotland
- Position: Centre-forward

Youth career
- 1952–1953: Ashfield

Senior career*
Years	Team	Apps	(Gls)
1953–1955	Celtic	0	(0)
1954	→ St Anthony's (loan)		
1955	→ Duntocher Hibernian (loan)		
1955–1957	British Army XI		
1957–1960	Celtic	44	(20)
1960–1963	Clyde	75	(30)
1963–1966	Ipswich Town	56	(17)
1966–1968	Glentoran	?	(3)
1967	→ Detroit Cougars (loan)	3	(1)
1968–1971	St Patrick's Athletic	?	(7)
Total		178	(78)

International career
1958	Scotland U23	1	(0)
1959	SFA trial v SFL	1	(3)
- * Club domestic league appearances and goals

John James Colrain (4 February 1937 – 14 July 1984) was a Scottish football player and manager who played for Celtic, Clyde, Ipswich Town and Glentoran. He later managed Glentoran and St Patrick's Athletic.

Colrain played once for the Scotland national under-23 football team at inside-left in a 1–2 defeat to the Netherlands in April 1958.
