= Len Campbell =

Scottish footballer

Personal information
- Date of birth: 23 December 1946
- Date of death: 22 November 2018 (aged 71)
- Position: Wing half

Youth career
- Yoker Athletic

Senior career*
Years	Team	Apps	(Gls)
1968–1971	Dumbarton	59	(0)
- * Club domestic league appearances and goals

Leonard B. Campbell (23 December 1946 – 22 November 2018) was a Scottish footballer. He started his career with junior side Yoker Athletic and rejoined after three seasons with Dumbarton. He died in November 2018.
