= Harry Kirk =

Scottish footballer (1944–2026)

Personal information
- Full name: Henry Joseph Kirk
- Date of birth: 25 August 1944
- Place of birth: Saltcoats, Scotland
- Date of death: 11 September 2026 (aged 82)
- Position: Left winger

Youth career
- Ardeer Recreation

Senior career*
Years	Team	Apps	(Gls)
1963–1964	Middlesbrough	1	(0)
1964–1965	Third Lanark	19	(1)
1965–1966	Falkirk	5	(1)
1966–1967	Dumbarton	32	(13)
1967–1969	Darlington	62	(7)
1969–1970	Hartlepool	45	(5)
1970–1973	Scunthorpe United	112	(16)
1973–1975	Stockport County	68	(7)
1975	IK Sirius	9	(2)
- * Club domestic league appearances and goals

Henry Joseph Kirk (25 August 1944 – 11 September 2026) was a Scottish professional footballer who played on the left wing. He played in the Football League in England for Middlesbrough, Darlington, Hartlepool, Scunthorpe United and Stockport County, in the Scottish Football League for Third Lanark, Falkirk and Dumbarton, and in the Swedish Division 2 Norra for IK Sirius.

Kirk died on 11 September 2026, aged 82.
