= Hector McKinlay =

Scottish footballer

Personal information
- Date of birth: 29 July 1940 (age 86)
- Place of birth: Falkirk, Scotland
- Position: Inside forward

Youth career
- Denny BC

Senior career*
Years	Team	Apps	(Gls)
1957–1959	Falkirk		
1962–1964	Dundee United	2	(1)
1964–1965	Dumbarton	3	(0)
- * Club domestic league appearances and goals

Hector McKinlay (born 29 July 1940) is a Scottish former footballer who played as an inside forward for Falkirk, Dundee United and Dumbarton.
