= Jim Kinsella =

Scottish footballer

Personal information
- Full name: James Kane Kinsella
- Date of birth: 22 July 1947
- Date of death: 13 April 2023 (aged 75)
- Place of death: Greenock
- Position: Forward

Senior career*
Years	Team	Apps	(Gls)
1964–1965	Dumbarton	1	(0)
1966–1970	East Fife	97	(13)
1969–1970	East Stirlingshire	40	(6)
1970–1971	Ayr United	1	(0)
- * Club domestic league appearances and goals

James Kane Kinsella (born 22 July 1947) is a Scottish former footballer who played for Dumbarton, East Fife, East Stirlingshire and Ayr United. He died on the 13th of April 2023.
