= 1967–68 Scottish Division Two =

Scottish Second Division
- Season: 1967–68
- Champions: St Mirren
- Promoted: St Mirren; Arbroath

The 1967–68 Scottish Second Division was won by St Mirren who, along with second placed Arbroath, were promoted to the First Division. Stenhousemuir finished bottom.

== Table ==
Pos	Team	Pld	W	D	L	GF	GA	GD	Pts	Promotion or relegation
1	St Mirren	36	27	8	1	100	23	+77	62	Promotion to the 1968–69 First Division
2	Arbroath	36	24	5	7	87	34	+53	53	Promotion to the 1968–69 First Division
3	East Fife	36	21	7	8	71	47	+24	49	
4	Queen's Park	36	20	8	8	76	47	+29	48	
5	Ayr United	36	18	6	12	69	48	+21	42	
6	Queen of the South	36	16	6	14	73	57	+16	38	
7	Forfar Athletic	36	14	10	12	57	63	−6	38	
8	Albion Rovers	36	14	9	13	62	55	+7	37	
9	Clydebank	36	13	8	15	62	73	−11	34	
10	Dumbarton	36	11	11	14	63	74	−11	33	
11	Hamilton Academical	36	13	7	16	49	58	−9	33	
12	Cowdenbeath	36	12	8	16	57	62	−5	32	
13	Montrose	36	10	11	15	54	64	−10	31	
14	Berwick Rangers	36	13	4	19	34	54	−20	30	
15	East Stirlingshire	36	9	10	17	61	74	−13	28	
16	Brechin City	36	8	12	16	45	62	−17	28	
17	Alloa Athletic	36	11	6	19	42	69	−27	28	
18	Stranraer	36	8	4	24	41	80	−39	20	
19	Stenhousemuir	36	7	6	23	34	93	−59	20	

Source: "1967-1968 Second Division - SPFL Archive". SPFL.
