= John McLaughlin (footballer, born 1936) =

Scottish footballer

Personal information
- Full name: John McLaughlin
- Date of birth: 13 November 1936 (age 89)
- Place of birth: Lennoxtown, Stirlingshire, Scotland
- Position: Forward

Youth career
- Clydebank Juniors

Senior career*
Years	Team	Apps	(Gls)
1959–1962	Clyde	61	(37)
1962–1963	Morton	25	(19)
1963–1964	Millwall	21	(5)
1964–1965	Dunfermline Athletic	24	(11)
1965–1966	Motherwell	18	(4)
1966	Durban City	4	(2)
1966	Westview Apollon	14	(8)
1967–1968	Rangers Johannesburg	41	(11)
1969	Berea Park		
Total		149	(76)
- * Club domestic league appearances and goals

John McLaughlin (born 13 November 1936) is a Scottish footballer who played as a forward in the Scottish League, the Football League and in South Africa.
