= 1966–67 Scottish Division Two =

Scottish Second Division
- Season: 1966–67
- Champions: Morton
- Promoted: Morton; Raith Rovers

The 1966–67 Scottish Division Two was won by Morton who, along with second placed Raith Rovers, were promoted to the First Division. Brechin City finished bottom.

== Table ==
Pos	Team	Pld	W	D	L	GF	GA	GD	Pts	Promotion or relegation
1	Morton	38	33	3	2	113	20	+93	69	Promotion to the 1967–68 First Division
2	Raith Rovers	38	27	4	7	95	44	+51	58	Promotion to the 1967–68 First Division
3	Arbroath	38	25	7	6	75	32	+43	57	
4	Hamilton Academical	38	18	8	12	74	60	+14	44	
5	East Fife	38	19	4	15	70	63	+7	42	
6	Cowdenbeath	38	16	8	14	70	55	+15	40	
7	Queen's Park	38	15	10	13	78	68	+10	40	
8	Albion Rovers	38	17	6	15	66	62	+4	40	
9	Queen of the South	38	15	9	14	84	76	+8	39	
10	Berwick Rangers	38	16	6	16	63	55	+8	38	
11	Third Lanark	38	13	8	17	67	78	−11	34	Club folded
12	Montrose	38	13	8	17	63	77	−14	34	
13	Alloa	38	15	4	19	55	74	−19	34	
14	Dumbarton	38	12	9	17	56	64	−8	33	
15	Stranraer	38	13	7	18	57	73	−16	33	
16	Forfar Athletic	38	12	3	23	74	106	−32	27	
17	Stenhousemuir	38	9	9	20	62	104	−42	27	
18	Clydebank	38	8	8	22	59	92	−33	24	
19	East Stirlingshire	38	7	10	21	44	87	−43	24	
20	Brechin City	38	8	7	23	58	93	−35	23	

Source: "1966-1967 Second Division - SPFL Archive". SPFL (in Malay).
