= Joe Broadfoot =

English footballer

Personal information
- Full name: Joseph James Broadfoot
- Date of birth: 4 March 1940 (age 86)
- Place of birth: Lewisham, England
- Height: 5 ft 8 in (1.73 m)
- Position: Winger

Youth career
- Millwall

Senior career*
| Years | Team | Apps | (Gls) |
| 1958–1963 | Millwall | 225 | (60) |
| 1963–1965 | Ipswich Town | 81 | (17) |
| 1965–1966 | Northampton Town | 17 | (1) |
| 1966–1967 | Millwall | 26 | (5) |
| 1967–1968 | Ipswich Town | 20 | (2) |
| Total | | 369 | (85) |
- * Club domestic league appearances and goals

Joseph James Broadfoot (born 4 March 1940) is an English former professional footballer. During his career he made over 250 appearances for Millwall and over 100 for Ipswich Town in two spells for both clubs.

Ipswich paid £16,000 for Broadfoot in October 1963.
