= George Muir (Australian footballer) =

Australian rules footballer (1896–1959)

Personal information
- Full name: George Maurice Muir
- Born: 11 January 1896; Carlton, Victoria
- Died: 4 August 1959 (aged 63); Upper Ferntree Gully, Victoria
- Original team: Bendigo
- Height: 178 cm (5 ft 10 in)
- Weight: 67.5 kg (149 lb)
- Position: Follower

Playing career^{1}
Years	Club	Games (Goals)
1915, 1918–19	Carlton	4 (2)
1919	Fitzroy	1 (1)
Total		5 (3)
- ^{1} Playing statistics correct to the end of 19.

George Maurice Muir (11 January 1896 – 4 August 1959) was an Australian rules footballer who played with Carlton and Fitzroy in the Victorian Football League.
