= 1965–66 Scottish League Cup =

Tournament details
- Country: Scotland

Final positions
- Champions: Celtic
- Runners-up: Rangers

The 1965–66 Scottish League Cup was the twentieth season of Scotland's second football knockout competition. The competition was won by Celtic, who defeated Rangers in the Final.

== First round ==
=== Group 1 ===
Team	Pld	W	D	L	GF	GA	GR	Pts
Celtic	6	4	0	2	11	7	1.571	8
Motherwell	6	3	0	3	9	11	0.818	6
Dundee	6	2	1	3	7	7	1.000	5
Dundee United	6	2	1	3	9	11	0.818	5

Home team	Score	Away team	Date
Dundee United	2–1	Celtic	14 August 1965
Motherwell	1–0	Dundee	14 August 1965
Celtic	1–0	Motherwell	18 August 1965
Dundee	0–0	Dundee United	18 August 1965
Celtic	0–2	Dundee	21 August 1965
Dundee United	4–1	Motherwell	21 August 1965
Celtic	3–0	Dundee United	28 August 1965
Dundee	1–2	Motherwell	28 August 1965
Dundee United	1–3	Dundee	1 September 1965
Motherwell	2–3	Celtic	1 September 1965
Dundee	1–3	Celtic	4 September 1965
Motherwell	3–2	Dundee United	4 September 1965

=== Group 2 ===
Team	Pld	W	D	L	GF	GA	GR	Pts
Rangers	6	4	0	2	13	7	1.857	8
Heart of Midlothian	6	3	1	2	10	7	1.429	7
Aberdeen	6	3	1	2	7	8	0.875	7
Clyde	6	1	0	5	5	13	0.385	2

Home team	Score	Away team	Date
Clyde	1–2	Aberdeen	14 August 1965
Heart of Midlothian	4–2	Rangers	14 August 1965
Aberdeen	1–1	Heart of Midlothian	18 August 1965
Rangers	3–0	Clyde	18 August 1965
Aberdeen	2–0	Rangers	21 August 1965
Heart of Midlothian	1–2	Clyde	21 August 1965
Aberdeen	2–0	Clyde	28 August 1965
Rangers	1–0	Heart of Midlothian	28 August 1965
Clyde	1–3	Rangers	1 September 1965
Heart of Midlothian	2–0	Aberdeen	1 September 1965
Clyde	1–2	Heart of Midlothian	4 September 1965
Rangers	4–0	Aberdeen	4 September 1965

=== Group 3 ===
Team	Pld	W	D	L	GF	GA	GR	Pts
Kilmarnock	6	5	0	1	11	3	3.667	10
Dunfermline Athletic	6	3	1	2	14	9	1.556	7
St Johnstone	6	3	0	3	7	10	0.700	6
Partick Thistle	6	0	1	5	3	13	0.231	1

Home team	Score	Away team	Date
Partick Thistle	0–0	Dunfermline Athletic	14 August 1965
St Johnstone	0–1	Kilmarnock	14 August 1965
Dunfermline Athletic	5–1	St Johnstone	18 August 1965
Kilmarnock	2–0	Partick Thistle	18 August 1965
Dunfermline Athletic	1–3	Kilmarnock	21 August 1965
Partick Thistle	0–1	St Johnstone	21 August 1965
Dunfermline Athletic	6–2	Partick Thistle	28 August 1965
Kilmarnock	3–0	St Johnstone	28 August 1965
Partick Thistle	1–2	Kilmarnock	1 September 1965
St Johnstone	3–1	Dunfermline Athletic	1 September 1965
Kilmarnock	0–1	Dunfermline Athletic	4 September 1965
St Johnstone	2–0	Partick Thistle	4 September 1965

=== Group 4 ===
Team	Pld	W	D	L	GF	GA	GR	Pts
Hibernian	6	5	0	1	15	6	2.500	10
Falkirk	6	3	1	2	11	10	1.100	7
St Mirren	6	2	0	4	5	9	0.556	4
Morton	6	1	1	4	7	13	0.538	3

Home team	Score	Away team	Date
Falkirk	3–1	Hibernian	14 August 1965
St Mirren	1–2	Morton	14 August 1965
Hibernian	1–0	St Mirren	18 August 1965
Morton	1–1	Falkirk	18 August 1965
Falkirk	0–1	St Mirren	21 August 1965
Morton	2–4	Hibernian	21 August 1965
Hibernian	3–1	Falkirk	28 August 1965
Morton	0–1	St Mirren	28 August 1965
Falkirk	3–2	Morton	1 September 1965
St Mirren	0–3	Hibernian	1 September 1965
Hibernian	3–0	Morton	4 September 1965
St Mirren	2–3	Falkirk	4 September 1965

=== Group 5 ===
Team	Pld	W	D	L	GF	GA	GR	Pts
Third Lanark	6	3	2	1	13	10	1.300	8
Berwick Rangers	6	2	2	2	16	10	1.600	6
Cowdenbeath	6	2	2	2	7	11	0.636	6
Hamilton Academical	6	0	4	2	6	11	0.545	4

Home team	Score	Away team	Date
Berwick Rangers	4–1	Third Lanark	14 August 1965
Cowdenbeath	1–1	Hamilton Academical	14 August 1965
Hamilton Academical	1–1	Berwick Rangers	18 August 1965
Third Lanark	1–1	Cowdenbeath	18 August 1965
Berwick Rangers	6–1	Cowdenbeath	21 August 1965
Hamilton Academical	2–2	Third Lanark	21 August 1965
Hamilton Academical	0–1	Cowdenbeath	28 August 1965
Third Lanark	3–2	Berwick Rangers	28 August 1965
Berwick Rangers	1–1	Hamilton Academical	1 September 1965
Cowdenbeath	0–1	Third Lanark	1 September 1965
Cowdenbeath	3–2	Berwick Rangers	4 September 1965
Third Lanark	5–1	Hamilton Academical	4 September 1965

=== Group 6 ===
Team	Pld	W	D	L	GF	GA	GR	Pts
Raith Rovers	6	4	2	0	15	7	2.143	10
Queen's Park	6	2	2	2	7	10	0.700	6
Stirling Albion	6	2	0	4	10	11	0.909	4
Arbroath	6	1	2	3	11	15	0.733	4

Home team	Score	Away team	Date
Queen's Park	2–2	Arbroath	14 August 1965
Raith Rovers	3–1	Stirling Albion	14 August 1965
Arbroath	2–2	Raith Rovers	18 August 1965
Stirling Albion	0–2	Queen's Park	18 August 1965
Arbroath	1–3	Stirling Albion	21 August 1965
Queen's Park	1–1	Raith Rovers	21 August 1965
Arbroath	3–0	Queen's Park	28 August 1965
Stirling Albion	1–2	Raith Rovers	28 August 1965
Queen's Park	2–1	Stirling Albion	1 September 1965
Raith Rovers	4–2	Arbroath	1 September 1965
Raith Rovers	3–0	Queen's Park	4 September 1965
Stirling Albion	4–1	Arbroath	4 September 1965

=== Group 7 ===
Team	Pld	W	D	L	GF	GA	GR	Pts
Airdrieonians	6	5	0	1	22	13	1.692	10
Albion Rovers	6	2	2	2	12	12	1.000	6
Queen of the South	6	1	2	3	8	12	0.667	4
Stranraer	6	1	2	3	5	10	0.500	4

Home team	Score	Away team	Date
Albion Rovers	1–1	Queen of the South	14 August 1965
Stranraer	1–3	Airdrieonians	14 August 1965
Airdrieonians	6–1	Albion Rovers	18 August 1965
Queen of the South	1–2	Stranraer	18 August 1965
Airdrieonians	5–1	Queen of the South	21 August 1965
Stranraer	0–0	Albion Rovers	21 August 1965
Airdrieonians	3–0	Stranraer	28 August 1965
Queen of the South	2–0	Albion Rovers	28 August 1965
Albion Rovers	8–2	Airdrieonians	1 September 1965
Stranraer	1–1	Queen of the South	1 September 1965
Albion Rovers	2–1	Stranraer	4 September 1965
Queen of the South	2–3	Airdrieonians	4 September 1965

=== Group 8 ===
Team	Pld	W	D	L	GF	GA	GR	Pts
Alloa Athletic	6	4	0	2	10	10	1.000	8
Dumbarton	6	3	0	3	15	9	1.667	6
East Stirlingshire	6	3	0	3	11	10	1.100	6
East Fife	6	2	0	4	13	20	0.650	4

Home team	Score	Away team	Date
Alloa Athletic	3–2	East Fife	14 August 1965
Dumbarton	2–1	East Stirlingshire	14 August 1965
East Fife	3–2	Dumbarton	18 August 1965
East Stirlingshire	1–0	Alloa Athletic	18 August 1965
Alloa Athletic	2–1	Dumbarton	21 August 1965
East Fife	4–1	East Stirlingshire	21 August 1965
East Fife	1–2	Alloa Athletic	28 August 1965
East Stirlingshire	1–0	Dumbarton	28 August 1965
Alloa Athletic	2–1	East Stirlingshire	1 September 1965
Dumbarton	6–1	East Fife	1 September 1965
Dumbarton	4–1	Alloa Athletic	4 September 1965
East Stirlingshire	6–2	East Fife	4 September 1965

=== Group 9 ===
Team	Pld	W	D	L	GF	GA	GR	Pts
Ayr United	4	4	0	0	14	3	4.667	8
Stenhousemuir	4	3	0	1	8	7	1.143	6
Forfar Athletic	4	1	0	3	6	7	0.857	2
Montrose	4	1	0	3	4	12	0.333	2
Brechin City	4	1	0	3	1	4	0.250	2

Home team	Score	Away team	Date
Ayr United	5–2	Stenhousemuir	14 August 1965
Forfar Athletic	4–1	Montrose	14 August 1965
Montrose	2–0	Brechin City	18 August 1965
Stenhousemuir	2–1	Forfar Athletic	18 August 1965
Ayr United	5–0	Montrose	21 August 1965
Brechin City	1–0	Forfar Athletic	21 August 1965
Brechin City	0–1	Ayr United	28 August 1965
Montrose	1–3	Stenhousemuir	28 August 1965
Forfar Athletic	1–3	Ayr United	4 September 1965
Stenhousemuir	1–0	Brechin City	4 September 1965

== Supplementary round ==
=== First leg ===
Home team	Score	Away team	Date
Third Lanark	1–2	Ayr United	6 September 1965

=== Second leg ===
Home team	Score	Away team	Date	Agg
Ayr United	1–0	Third Lanark	8 September 1965	3–1

== Quarter-finals ==
=== First leg ===
Home team	Score	Away team	Date
Airdrieonians	1–5	Rangers	15 September 1965
Alloa Athletic	0–2	Hibernian	15 September 1965
Kilmarnock	2–0	Ayr United	15 September 1965
Raith Rovers	1–8	Celtic	15 September 1965

=== Second leg ===
Home team	Score	Away team	Date	Agg
Ayr United	2–2	Kilmarnock	22 September 1965	2–4
Celtic	4–0	Raith Rovers	22 September 1965	12–1
Hibernian	11–2	Alloa Athletic	22 September 1965	13–2
Rangers	4–0	Airdrieonians	22 September 1965	9–1

== Semi-finals ==
=== Ties ===
Home team	Score	Away team	Date
Celtic	2–2	Hibernian	4 October 1965
Rangers	6–4	Kilmarnock	6 October 1965

=== Replays ===
Home team	Score	Away team	Date
Celtic	4–0	Hibernian	18 October 1965

== Final ==
23 October 1965

Rangers	1–2	Celtic
Young (o.g.)		Hughes

Hampden Park, Glasgow
Attendance: 107,609
