= 1964–65 Scottish Division Two =

Scottish Second Division
- Season: 1964–65
- Champions: Stirling Albion
- Promoted: Stirling Albion; Hamilton Academical

The 1964–65 Scottish Second Division was won by Stirling Albion who, along with second placed Hamilton Academical, were promoted to the First Division. Brechin City finished bottom.

== Table ==
| Pos | Team | Pld | W | D | L | GF | GA | GD | Pts | Promotion or relegation |
|---|---|---|---|---|---|---|---|---|---|---|
| 1 | Stirling Albion | 36 | 26 | 7 | 3 | 84 | 31 | +53 | 59 | Promotion to the 1965–66 First Division |
| 2 | Hamilton Academical | 36 | 21 | 8 | 7 | 86 | 53 | +33 | 50 | Promotion to the 1965–66 First Division |
| 3 | Queen of the South | 36 | 16 | 13 | 7 | 84 | 50 | +34 | 45 | |
| 4 | Queen's Park | 36 | 17 | 9 | 10 | 57 | 41 | +16 | 43 | |
| 5 | E. S. Clydebank | 36 | 15 | 10 | 11 | 64 | 50 | +14 | 40 | |
| 6 | Stranraer | 36 | 17 | 6 | 13 | 74 | 64 | +10 | 40 | |
| 7 | Arbroath | 36 | 13 | 13 | 10 | 56 | 51 | +5 | 39 | |
| 8 | Berwick Rangers | 36 | 15 | 9 | 12 | 73 | 70 | +3 | 39 | |
| 9 | East Fife | 36 | 15 | 7 | 14 | 78 | 77 | +1 | 37 | |
| 10 | Alloa Athletic | 36 | 14 | 8 | 14 | 71 | 81 | −10 | 36 | |
| 11 | Albion Rovers | 36 | 14 | 5 | 17 | 56 | 60 | −4 | 33 | |
| 12 | Cowdenbeath | 36 | 11 | 10 | 15 | 55 | 62 | −7 | 32 | |
| 13 | Raith Rovers | 36 | 9 | 14 | 13 | 54 | 61 | −7 | 32 | |
| 14 | Dumbarton | 36 | 13 | 6 | 17 | 55 | 67 | −12 | 32 | |
| 15 | Stenhousemuir | 36 | 11 | 8 | 17 | 49 | 74 | −25 | 30 | |
| 16 | Montrose | 36 | 10 | 9 | 17 | 80 | 91 | −11 | 29 | |
| 17 | Forfar Athletic | 36 | 9 | 7 | 20 | 63 | 89 | −26 | 25 | |
| 18 | Ayr United | 36 | 9 | 6 | 21 | 49 | 67 | −18 | 24 | |
| 19 | Brechin City | 36 | 6 | 7 | 23 | 53 | 102 | −49 | 19 | |
