= 1965–66 Scottish Division Two =

Scottish Second Division
- Season: 1965–66
- Champions: Ayr United
- Promoted: Ayr United; Airdrieonians

The 1965–66 Scottish Second Division was won by Ayr United who, along with second placed Airdrieonians, were promoted to the First Division. Forfar Athletic finished bottom.

== Table ==
Pos	Team	Pld	W	D	L	GF	GA	GD	Pts	Promotion or relegation
1	Ayr United	36	22	9	5	78	37	+41	53	Promotion to the 1966–67 First Division
2	Airdrieonians	36	22	6	8	107	56	+51	50	Promotion to the 1966–67 First Division
3	Queen of the South	36	18	11	7	73	46	+27	47	
4	East Fife	36	20	4	12	72	55	+17	44	
5	Raith Rovers	36	16	11	9	71	43	+28	43	
6	Arbroath	36	15	13	8	72	52	+20	43	
7	Albion Rovers	36	18	7	11	58	54	+4	43	
8	Alloa Athletic	36	14	10	12	65	65	0	38	
9	Montrose	36	15	7	14	67	63	+4	37	
10	Cowdenbeath	36	15	7	14	69	68	+1	37	
11	Berwick Rangers	36	12	11	13	69	58	+11	35	
12	Dumbarton	36	14	7	15	63	61	+2	35	
13	Queen's Park	36	13	7	16	62	65	−3	33	
14	Third Lanark	36	12	8	16	55	65	−10	32	
15	Stranraer	36	9	10	17	64	83	−19	28	
16	Brechin City	36	10	7	19	52	92	−40	27	
17	East Stirlingshire	36	9	5	22	59	91	−32	23	
18	Stenhousemuir	36	6	7	23	47	93	−46	19	
19	Forfar Athletic	36	7	3	26	61	120	−59	17	
