= Jimmy McGregor (footballer) =

Scottish footballer

Personal information
- Date of birth: 31 May 1943 (age 83)
- Position: Attacking midfielder

Youth career
- Grangemouth United

Senior career*
Years	Team	Apps	(Gls)
1960–1964	Stirling Albion	64	(2)
1964–1965	Dumbarton	15	(1)
1965–1966	East Stirling	29	(6)
1966–1970	Stenhousemuir	105	(27)
- * Club domestic league appearances and goals

Jimmy McGregor (born 31 May 1943) is a Scottish former footballer who played as an attacking midfielder for Stirling Albion, Dumbarton, East Stirling and Stenhousemuir.
