= Steve Anderson (footballer, born 1946) =

Scottish footballer

Personal information
- Date of birth: 13 November 1946 (age 79)
- Position: Goalkeeper

Youth career
- Dunipace

Senior career*
Years	Team	Apps	(Gls)
1968–1970	Dumbarton	7	(0)
1974–1975	Alloa Athletic	21	(0)
1974–1975	East Fife	7	(0)
- * Club domestic league appearances and goals

Stephen W McQ Anderson (born 13 November 1946) was a Scottish footballer who played for Dumbarton, Alloa Athletic and East Fife. He also had spells with several junior clubs, including Dunipace, Bo'ness and Kirkintilloch Rob Roy
