= 1968–69 Scottish Division Two =

Scottish Second Division
- Season: 1968–69
- Champions: Motherwell
- Promoted: Motherwell; Ayr United

The 1968–69 Scottish Second Division was won by Motherwell who, along with second placed Ayr United, were promoted to the First Division. Stenhousemuir finished bottom.

== Table ==
Pos	Team	Pld	W	D	L	GF	GA	GD	Pts	Promotion or relegation
1	Motherwell	36	30	4	2	112	23	+89	64	Promotion to the 1969–70 First Division
2	Ayr United	36	23	7	6	82	31	+51	53	Promotion to the 1969–70 First Division
3	East Fife	36	21	6	9	82	45	+37	48	
4	Stirling Albion	36	21	6	9	67	40	+27	48	
5	Queen of the South	36	20	7	9	75	41	+34	47	
6	Forfar Athletic	36	18	7	11	71	56	+15	43	
7	Albion Rovers	36	19	5	12	60	56	+4	43	
8	Stranraer	36	17	7	12	57	45	+12	41	
9	East Stirlingshire	36	17	5	14	70	62	+8	39	
10	Montrose	36	15	4	17	59	71	−12	34	
11	Queen's Park	36	13	7	16	50	59	−9	33	
12	Cowdenbeath	36	12	5	19	54	67	−13	29	
13	Clydebank	36	6	15	15	52	67	−15	27	
14	Dumbarton	36	11	5	20	46	69	−23	27	
15	Hamilton Academical	36	8	8	20	37	72	−35	24	
16	Berwick Rangers	36	7	9	20	42	70	−28	23	
17	Brechin City	36	8	6	22	40	78	−38	22	
18	Alloa Athletic	36	7	7	22	45	79	−34	21	
19	Stenhousemuir	36	6	6	24	55	125	−70	18	

Source: "1968-1969 Second Division - SPFL Archive". SPFL.
