= Danny Hegan =

Association footballer (1943–2015)

Personal information
- Full name: Daniel Hegan
- Date of birth: 14 June 1943
- Place of birth: Coatbridge, Scotland
- Date of death: 6 August 2015 (aged 72)
- Place of death: Birmingham, England
- Position: Midfielder

Youth career
- Bellshill Athletic

Senior career*
Years	Team	Apps	(Gls)
1959–1961	Albion Rovers	25	(4)
1961–1963	Sunderland	0	(0)
1963–1969	Ipswich Town	207	(34)
1969–1970	West Bromwich Albion	14	(2)
1970–1973	Wolverhampton Wanderers	53	(6)
1973–1974	Sunderland	6	(0)
1974–1975	Highlands Park		
1974	→ Partick Thistle (loan)	0	(0)
1975–1978	Coleshill Town		
Total		305	(46)

International career
1969–1973	Northern Ireland	7	(0)
- * Club domestic league appearances and goals

Daniel Hegan (14 June 1943 – 6 August 2015) was a professional footballer who played as a midfielder. Born in Scotland, he represented Northern Ireland at international level.

== Career ==
Hegan won seven caps for Northern Ireland in a career that saw him make 207 appearances for Ipswich Town. He also played for both Black Country rivals, West Bromwich Albion and Wolves, appearing in the 1972 UEFA Cup final for the latter. He ended his league career by returning to Sunderland, his first English club.

== Honours ==
Ipswich Town

- Football League Second Division: 1967–68

Individual

- Ipswich Town Hall of Fame: Inducted 2016
