= Tommy Dunne (footballer, born 1946) =

Scottish footballer (1946–2001)

Personal information
- Full name: Thomas Joseph Dunne
- Date of birth: 22 June 1946
- Place of birth: Glasgow, Scotland
- Date of death: 25 August 2001 (aged 55)
- Place of death: Glasgow, Scotland
- Position: Inside forward

Youth career
- St Anthony's

Senior career*
Years	Team	Apps	(Gls)
1964	Leyton Orient	1	(0)
1965	Dumbarton	3	(0)
1967–1968	Albion Rovers	35	(7)
1968–1971	Dundee United	11	
- * Club domestic league appearances and goals

Tommy Dunne (22 June 1946 – 2001) was a Scottish footballer who played as an inside forward. Dunne began his career in the mid-1960s with Leyton Orient, spending a short amount of time with the English side before returning to Scotland with Dumbarton. An equally short spell preceded a move to Albion Rovers, before a move to Dundee United towards the end of the decade. He then joined the Scottish junior side Irvine Meadow in June 1971.
