= Joe Davin =

Scottish footballer

Personal information
- Full name: Joseph James Davin
- Date of birth: 13 February 1942
- Place of birth: Dumbarton, Scotland
- Date of death: 30 September 2013 (aged 71)
- Place of death: Dumbarton, Scotland
- Position: Full back

Youth career
- Edinburgh Thistle
- Scotland School Boys (U16)

Senior career*
Years	Team	Apps	(Gls)
1959–1963	Hibernian	17	(1)
1963–1964	Ipswich Town	77	(0)
1966–1967	Morton	9	(0)
1966–1968	Dumbarton	34	(0)
Total		137	(1)
- * Club domestic league appearances and goals

Joseph James Davin (13 February 1942 – 30 September 2013) was a Scottish footballer, who played for Hibernian, Ipswich Town, Morton and Dumbarton

He was selected for the Scotland Schoolboys teams in 1956 and 1957. Playing against England in the Victory Shield on 23rd April 1957.

.
