= Andy McEachran =

Scottish footballer

Andy MacEachran
Personal information
- Full name: Andrew Grant MacEachran
- Date of birth: 25 July 1947 (age 79)
- Position: Winger

Youth career
- Ashfield Juniors

Senior career*
| Years | Team | Apps | (Gls) |
| 1966–1968 | Dumbarton | 18 | (3) |
- * Club domestic league appearances and goals

Andrew Grant MacEachran (born 25 July 1947) was a Scottish footballer who played for Dumbarton.
