= Andy McBeth =

Scottish footballer

Personal information
- Full name: Andrew Joseph McBeth
- Date of birth: 30 August 1943 (age 83)
- Position: Winger

Youth career
- Pollok

Senior career*
Years	Team	Apps	(Gls)
1963–1965	Stirling Albion	29	(10)
1964–1975	Morton	10	(2)
1965–1967	Dumbarton	27	(9)
- * Club domestic league appearances and goals

Andrew Joseph McBeth (born 30 August 1943) was a Scottish footballer who played for Dumbarton, Stirling Albion and Morton.
