= Bill McMurray =

Scottish footballer

Billy McMurray
Personal information
- Full name: William McMurray
- Date of birth: 9 March 1943
- Place of birth: Glasgow, Scotland
- Date of death: 12 May 2017 (aged 74)
- Place of death: Glasgow, Scotland
- Position: Full back

Senior career*
Years	Team	Apps	(Gls)
1966–1968	Albion Rovers	54	(10)
1967–1969	Dumbarton	43	(0)
- * Club domestic league appearances and goals

Billy "Buff" McMurray (born 9 March 1943) was a Scottish footballer who played for Albion Rovers and Dumbarton.
