= George Muir (footballer, born 1940) =

Scottish footballer

Personal information
- Date of birth: 21 January 1940
- Place of birth: Stirling, Scotland
- Date of death: 13 December 1999 (aged 59)
- Place of death: Stirling, Scotland
- Position: Full-back

Senior career*
Years	Team	Apps	(Gls)
1958–1968	Partick Thistle	182	(3)
1968–1972	Dumbarton	109	(2)
- * Club domestic league appearances and goals

George Muir (21 January 1940 – 13 December 1999) was a Scottish footballer who played for Partick Thistle and Dumbarton.
