= Jim Lynas =

Scottish footballer (born 1942)

Personal information
- Date of birth: 4 November 1942 (age 83)
- Position: Centre forward

Youth career
- Blantyre Celtic

Senior career*
Years	Team	Apps	(Gls)
1965–1968	Dumbarton	72	(13)
1968–1969	Ross County		
1969–1970	Inverness Caledonian		
1970–1971	Ross County		
1971–1972	Inverness Caledonian		
1974–1975	Ross County		
- * Club domestic league appearances and goals

James B. Lynas (born 4 November 1942) was a Scottish footballer who played for Dumbarton, Ross County and Inverness Caledonian.
