= Allan Watson (footballer) =

Scottish footballer

Personal information
- Date of birth: 3 August 1948 (age 78)
- Position: Outside right

Youth career
- Vale of Leven Juniors

Senior career*
Years	Team	Apps	(Gls)
1966–1971	Dumbarton	110	(27)
- * Club domestic league appearances and goals

Allan Watson (born 3 August 1948) was a Scottish footballer who played for Dumbarton.
