= Mike McGowan =

Scottish footballer

Personal information
- Full name: Mike McGowan
- Date of birth: 15 July 1947 (age 79)
- Place of birth: Glasgow, Scotland
- Position: Inside forward

Youth career
- St Rochs Juniors

Senior career*
Years	Team	Apps	(Gls)
1965–1966	Celtic	5	(8)
1966–1969	Dumbarton	52	(3)
1970–1971	Hamilton	11	(3)
- * Club domestic league appearances and goals

Mike McGowan (born 15 July 1947) is a Scottish footballer, who played for Celtic, Dumbarton and Hamilton. Now living on South Africa after playing for several South African clubs. He now teaches football at a local school.
