= Drew Nelson (footballer) =

Scottish footballer

Personal information
- Position: Inside forward

Senior career*
Years	Team	Apps	(Gls)
1960–1961	St Mirren	1	(0)
1962–1963	Worcester City		
1964–1965	Ayr United	7	(0)
1964–1967	Dumbarton	89	(33)
1966–1969	East Fife	54	(12)
1969–1970	Clydebank	4	(1)
- * Club domestic league appearances and goals

Drew Nelson was a Scottish footballer who played during the 1960s with St Mirren, Worcester City, Ayr United, Dumbarton, East Fife and Clydebank.
