= 1964–65 Scottish League Cup =

Tournament details
- Country: Scotland
- Teams: 37

Final positions
- Champions: Rangers
- Runners-up: Celtic

Tournament statistics
- Matches played: 119
- Goals scored: 455 (3.82 per match)

The 1964–65 Scottish League Cup was the 19th season of Scotland's second football knockout competition. The competition was won for the successive second season by Rangers, who defeated Celtic in the Final.

== First round ==
=== Group 1 ===
Team	Pld	W	D	L	GF	GA	GR	Pts
Rangers	6	5	1	0	26	7	3.714	11
St Mirren	6	2	3	1	11	12	0.917	7
Aberdeen	6	1	3	2	11	15	0.733	5
St Johnstone	6	0	1	5	5	19	0.263	1

Home team	Score	Away team	Date
Rangers	4–0	Aberdeen	8 August 1964
St Johnstone	1–2	St Mirren	8 August 1964
Aberdeen	2–1	St Johnstone	12 August 1964
St Mirren	0–0	Rangers	12 August 1964
St Johnstone	1–9	Rangers	15 August 1964
St Mirren	3–3	Aberdeen	15 August 1964
Aberdeen	3–4	Rangers	22 August 1964
St Mirren	2–0	St Johnstone	22 August 1964
Rangers	6–2	St Mirren	26 August 1964
St Johnstone	1–1	Aberdeen	26 August 1964
Aberdeen	2–2	St Mirren	29 August 1964
Rangers	3–1	St Johnstone	29 August 1964

=== Group 2 ===
Team	Pld	W	D	L	GF	GA	GR	Pts
Dunfermline Athletic	6	5	1	0	14	3	4.667	11
Hibernian	6	4	1	1	15	4	3.750	9
Third Lanark	6	2	0	4	8	12	0.667	4
Airdrieonians	6	0	0	6	5	23	0.217	0

Home team	Score	Away team	Date
Airdrieonians	1–4	Dunfermline Athletic	8 August 1964
Hibernian	3–0	Third Lanark	8 August 1964
Dunfermline Athletic	2–0	Hibernian	12 August 1964
Third Lanark	5–2	Airdrieonians	12 August 1964
Dunfermline Athletic	3–1	Third Lanark	15 August 1964
Hibernian	5–0	Airdrieonians	15 August 1964
Dunfermline Athletic	3–0	Airdrieonians	22 August 1964
Third Lanark	0–2	Hibernian	22 August 1964
Airdrieonians	1–2	Third Lanark	26 August 1964
Hibernian	1–1	Dunfermline Athletic	26 August 1964
Airdrieonians	1–4	Hibernian	29 August 1964
Third Lanark	0–1	Dunfermline Athletic	29 August 1964

=== Group 3 ===
Team	Pld	W	D	L	GF	GA	GR	Pts
Celtic	6	4	1	1	18	5	3.600	9
Kilmarnock	6	3	2	1	9	5	1.800	8
Partick Thistle	6	1	2	3	6	14	0.429	4
Heart of Midlothian	6	1	1	4	7	16	0.438	3

Home team	Score	Away team	Date
Celtic	0–0	Partick Thistle	8 August 1964
Kilmarnock	1–1	Heart of Midlothian	8 August 1964
Heart of Midlothian	0–3	Celtic	12 August 1964
Partick Thistle	0–0	Kilmarnock	12 August 1964
Celtic	4–1	Kilmarnock	15 August 1964
Partick Thistle	2–1	Heart of Midlothian	15 August 1964
Heart of Midlothian	0–1	Kilmarnock	22 August 1964
Partick Thistle	1–5	Celtic	22 August 1964
Celtic	6–1	Heart of Midlothian	26 August 1964
Kilmarnock	4–0	Partick Thistle	26 August 1964
Heart of Midlothian	4–3	Partick Thistle	29 August 1964
Kilmarnock	2–0	Celtic	29 August 1964

=== Group 4 ===
Team	Pld	W	D	L	GF	GA	GR	Pts
Dundee United	6	5	0	1	13	9	1.444	10
Dundee	6	3	0	3	16	10	1.600	6
Motherwell	6	2	1	3	8	11	0.727	5
Falkirk	6	1	1	4	9	16	0.563	3

Home team	Score	Away team	Date
Dundee	2–3	Dundee United	8 August 1964
Falkirk	1–1	Motherwell	8 August 1964
Dundee United	3–0	Falkirk	12 August 1964
Motherwell	3–0	Dundee	12 August 1964
Dundee	4–1	Falkirk	15 August 1964
Motherwell	0–1	Dundee United	15 August 1964
Dundee United	2–1	Dundee	22 August 1964
Motherwell	3–1	Falkirk	22 August 1964
Dundee	6–0	Motherwell	26 August 1964
Falkirk	5–2	Dundee United	26 August 1964
Dundee United	2–1	Motherwell	29 August 1964
Falkirk	1–3	Dundee	29 August 1964

=== Group 5 ===
Team	Pld	W	D	L	GF	GA	GR	Pts
East Fife	6	4	1	1	20	9	2.222	9
Queen of the South	6	3	2	1	13	10	1.300	8
Raith Rovers	6	3	1	2	20	11	1.818	7
Montrose	6	0	0	6	5	28	0.179	0

Home team	Score	Away team	Date
Queen of the South	2–0	Montrose	8 August 1964
Raith Rovers	1–4	East Fife	8 August 1964
East Fife	5–0	Queen of the South	12 August 1964
Montrose	2–4	Raith Rovers	12 August 1964
East Fife	4–2	Montrose	15 August 1964
Queen of the South	1–1	Raith Rovers	15 August 1964
East Fife	1–5	Raith Rovers	22 August 1964
Montrose	1–6	Queen of the South	22 August 1964
Queen of the South	1–1	East Fife	26 August 1964
Raith Rovers	7–0	Montrose	26 August 1964
Montrose	0–5	East Fife	29 August 1964
Raith Rovers	2–3	Queen of the South	29 August 1964

=== Group 6 ===
Team	Pld	W	D	L	GF	GA	GR	Pts
Hamilton Academical	6	3	2	1	15	7	2.143	8
Stranraer	6	2	4	0	13	11	1.182	8
E. S. Clydebank	6	1	4	1	11	12	0.917	6
Stenhousemuir	6	0	2	4	7	16	0.438	2

Home team	Score	Away team	Date
E. S. Clydebank	2–2	Stenhousemuir	8 August 1964
Hamilton Academical	2–2	Stranraer	8 August 1964
Stenhousemuir	1–2	Hamilton Academical	12 August 1964
Stranraer	2–2	E. S. Clydebank	12 August 1964
E. S. Clydebank	2–4	Hamilton Academical	15 August 1964
Stenhousemuir	3–3	Stranraer	15 August 1964
Stenhousemuir	1–2	E. S. Clydebank	22 August 1964
Stranraer	2–1	Hamilton Academical	22 August 1964
E. S. Clydebank	3–3	Stranraer	26 August 1964
Hamilton Academical	6–0	Stenhousemuir	26 August 1964
Hamilton Academical	0–0	E. S. Clydebank	29 August 1964
Stranraer	1–0	Stenhousemuir	29 August 1964

=== Group 7 ===
Team	Pld	W	D	L	GF	GA	GR	Pts
Clyde	6	4	2	0	17	4	4.250	10
Arbroath	6	2	2	2	11	10	1.100	6
Albion Rovers	6	2	0	4	7	15	0.467	4
Queen's Park	6	1	2	3	5	11	0.455	4

Home team	Score	Away team	Date
Arbroath	1–3	Albion Rovers	8 August 1964
Queen's Park	0–0	Clyde	8 August 1964
Albion Rovers	0–1	Queen's Park	12 August 1964
Clyde	1–1	Arbroath	12 August 1964
Albion Rovers	0–5	Clyde	15 August 1964
Queen's Park	1–3	Arbroath	15 August 1964
Albion Rovers	1–3	Arbroath	22 August 1964
Clyde	4–1	Queen's Park	22 August 1964
Arbroath	1–2	Clyde	26 August 1964
Queen's Park	0–2	Albion Rovers	26 August 1964
Arbroath	2–2	Queen's Park	29 August 1964
Clyde	5–1	Albion Rovers	29 August 1964

=== Group 8 ===
Team	Pld	W	D	L	GF	GA	GR	Pts
Morton	6	3	3	0	14	5	2.800	9
Dumbarton	6	2	3	1	8	7	1.143	7
Ayr United	6	2	1	3	11	8	1.375	5
Berwick Rangers	6	1	1	4	7	20	0.350	3

Home team	Score	Away team	Date
Berwick Rangers	3–1	Ayr United	8 August 1964
Morton	1–1	Dumbarton	8 August 1964
Ayr United	0–1	Morton	12 August 1964
Dumbarton	3–2	Berwick Rangers	12 August 1964
Ayr United	2–1	Dumbarton	15 August 1964
Berwick Rangers	0–5	Morton	15 August 1964
Ayr United	6–0	Berwick Rangers	22 August 1964
Dumbarton	1–1	Morton	22 August 1964
Berwick Rangers	0–0	Dumbarton	26 August 1964
Morton	1–1	Ayr United	26 August 1964
Dumbarton	2–1	Ayr United	29 August 1964
Morton	5–2	Berwick Rangers	29 August 1964

=== Group 9 ===
Team	Pld	W	D	L	GF	GA	GR	Pts
Forfar Athletic	4	4	0	0	11	3	3.667	8
Alloa Athletic	4	2	1	1	7	7	1.000	5
Stirling Albion	4	2	0	2	10	5	2.000	4
Cowdenbeath	4	1	0	3	8	15	0.533	2
Brechin City	4	0	1	3	3	9	0.333	1

Home team	Score	Away team	Date
Brechin City	1–4	Stirling Albion	8 August 1964
Cowdenbeath	1–2	Forfar Athletic	8 August 1964
Alloa Athletic	0–0	Cowdenbeath	12 August 1964
Forfar Athletic	4–1	Brechin City	12 August 1964
Brechin City	3–5	Alloa Athletic	15 August 1964
Stirling Albion	1–2	Forfar Athletic	15 August 1964
Forfar Athletic	3–0	Alloa Athletic	22 August 1964
Stirling Albion	4–0	Cowdenbeath	22 August 1964
Alloa Athletic	2–1	Stirling Albion	29 August 1964
Cowdenbeath	2–3	Brechin City	29 August 1964

== Supplementary round ==
=== First leg ===
Home team	Score	Away team	Date	Agg
Forfar Athletic	4–3	East Fife	31 August 1964	

=== Second leg ===
Home team	Score	Away team	Date	Agg
East Fife	4–1	Forfar Athletic	2 September 1964	7–5

== Quarter-finals ==
=== First leg ===
Home team	Score	Away team	Date
Clyde	0–3	Morton	9 September 1964
Dundee United	8–0	Hamilton Academical	9 September 1964
Dunfermline Athletic	0–3	Rangers	14 September 1964
East Fife	2–0	Celtic	9 September 1964

=== Second leg ===
Home team	Score	Away team	Date	Agg
Celtic	6–0	East Fife	16 September 1964	6–2
Hamilton Academical	1–2	Dundee United	16 September 1964	1–10
Morton	0–2	Clyde	16 September 1964	3–2
Rangers	2–2	Dunfermline Athletic	16 September 1964	5–2

== Semi-finals ==
=== Ties ===
Home team	Score	Away team	Date
Celtic	2–0	Morton	29 September 1964
Rangers	2–1	Dundee United	30 September 1964

== Final ==
24 October 1964

Rangers	2–1	Celtic
Forrest		Johnstone

Hampden Park, Glasgow
Attendance: 91,423
