= John McGhee =

Scottish footballer

Personal information
- Full name: John McGhee
- Date of birth: 5 July 1945
- Date of death: 1 September 1975 (aged 30)
- Place of death: Sydney, Australia
- Position: Centre-back

Youth career
- Vale of Leven Juniors

Senior career*
Years	Team	Apps	(Gls)
1966–1970	Dumbarton	59	(0)
1969–1970	Stenhousemuir	1	(0)
1970–1971	Stirling Albion	28	(0)
- * Club domestic league appearances and goals

John McGhee (5 July 1945 – 1 September 1975) was a Scottish footballer who played for Dumbarton, Stenhousemuir and Stirling Albion.

He immigrated to Australia in 1970, but died in a car crash five years later.
