= Maurice Dunne (footballer) =

Scottish footballer

Personal information
- Full name: Maurice Joseph Dunne
- Date of birth: 19 June 1947 (age 79)
- Position: Forward

Youth career
- Our Lady's HS

Senior career*
Years	Team	Apps	(Gls)
1965–1968	Dumbarton	24	(0)
1967–1968	Renton	4	(0)
- * Club domestic league appearances and goals

Maurice Joseph Dunne (born 19 June 1947) was a Scottish footballer who played for Dumbarton and Clydebank.
