= Bobby Johnstone (1960s footballer) =

Scottish footballer

Personal information
- Position: Left half

Youth career
- Muirkirk

Senior career*
Years	Team	Apps	(Gls)
1958–1964	Stirling Albion	130	(4)
1963–1965	Airdrie	5	(0)
1964–1969	Dumbarton	95	(4)
- * Club domestic league appearances and goals

Bobby Johnstone was a Scottish footballer who played during the 1960s. He first signed 'senior' for Stirling Albion before transferring to Airdrie and then to Dumbarton.
