= List of winners of the Scottish Championship and predecessors =

A national second tier of Scottish league football was established in season 1893–94, as Division Two. Until the 1921–22 season, promotion was not automatic but decided by Scottish Football League clubs on a ballot basis, thus some champion teams were able to retain the title. In the 1946–47 season it became known as the B Division before being changed back to Division Two for season 1955–56.

The second tier became known as the First Division in season 1975–76, when the top division (Division One) became the Premier Division, although its status within the Scottish football league system league system changed in 1998–99 when clubs from the top tier (Premier Division) broke away to form the Scottish Premier League. The First Division was still the second tier in the Scottish league system, but was the top level of the Scottish Football League rather than the second. The Scottish Premier League and Scottish Football League merged in 2013 to form the Scottish Professional Football League, with the second tier becoming known as the Scottish Championship.

== Scottish Football League Division Two (1893–1946) ==
Season	Winner	Runner-up	Third
1893–94	Hibernian	Cowlairs	Clyde
1894–95	Hibernian (2)	Motherwell	Port Glasgow Athletic and Renton
1895–96	Abercorn	Leith Athletic	Renton and Kilmarnock
1896–97	Partick Thistle	Leith Athletic	Kilmarnock and Airdrieonians
1897–98	Kilmarnock	Port Glasgow Athletic	Morton
1898–99	Kilmarnock (2)	Leith Athletic	Port Glasgow Athletic
1899–1900	Partick Thistle (2)	Morton	Port Glasgow Athletic
1900–01	St Bernard's	Airdrieonians	Abercorn
1901–02	Port Glasgow Athletic	Partick Thistle	Motherwell
1902–03	Airdrieonians	Motherwell	Ayr and Leith Athletic
1903–04	Hamilton Academical	Clyde	Ayr
1904–05	Clyde	Falkirk	Hamilton Academical
1905–06	Leith Athletic	Clyde	Albion Rovers
1906–07	St Bernard's (2)	Vale of Leven and Arthurlie	—
1907–08	Raith Rovers	Dumbarton and Ayr	—
1908–09	Abercorn (2)	Raith Rovers and Vale of Leven	—
1909–10^{[A]}	Leith Athletic (2) and Raith Rovers (2)	—	St Bernard's
1910–11	Dumbarton	Ayr United	Albion Rovers
1911–12	Ayr United	Abercorn	Dumbarton
1912–13	Ayr United (2)	Dunfermline Athletic	East Stirlingshire
1913–14	Cowdenbeath	Albion Rovers	Dundee Hibernian and Dunfermline Athletic
1914–15	Cowdenbeath (2)	Leith Athletic	St Bernard's
1915–1921	Second tier suspended due to World War I		
1921–22	Alloa Athletic	Cowdenbeath	Armadale
1922–23	Queen's Park	Clydebank	St Johnstone
1923–24	St Johnstone	Cowdenbeath	Bathgate
1924–25	Dundee United	Clydebank	Clyde
1925–26	Dunfermline Athletic	Clyde	Ayr United
1926–27	Bo'ness	Raith Rovers	Clydebank
1927–28	Ayr United (3)	Third Lanark	King's Park
1928–29	Dundee United (2)	Morton	Arbroath
1929–30	Leith Athletic (3)	East Fife	Albion Rovers
1930–31	Third Lanark	Dundee United	Dunfermline Athletic
1931–32	East Stirlingshire	St Johnstone	Raith Rovers
1932–33	Hibernian (3)	Queen of the South	Dunfermline Athletic
1933–34	Albion Rovers	Dunfermline Athletic	Arbroath
1934–35	Third Lanark (2)	Arbroath	St Bernard's
1935–36	Falkirk	St Mirren	Morton
1936–37	Ayr United (4)	Morton	St Bernard's
1937–38	Raith Rovers (3)	Albion Rovers	Airdrieonians
1938–39	Cowdenbeath (3)	Alloa Athletic	East Fife
1939–1946	League suspended due to World War II		

^{A} Before 1915 clubs finishing on equal points would play-off for the title. In 1909–10 Leith Athletic and Raith Rovers both finished with 33 points but decided not to play-off for the title and were therefore declared joint Champions.

== Scottish Football League Division B (1946–1955) ==
Season	Winner	Runner-up	Third	Top scorer	
Season	Winner	Runner-up	Third	Player	Goals
1946–47	Dundee	Airdrieonians	East Fife	Bobby Flavell (Airdrieonians)	38
1947–48	East Fife	Albion Rovers	Hamilton Academical	Henry Morris (East Fife)	39
1948–49	Raith Rovers (4)	Stirling Albion	Airdrieonians	Willie Penman (Raith Rovers)	35
1949–50	Morton	Airdrieonians	Dunfermline Athletic	Neil Mochan (Morton)	24
1950–51	Queen of the South	Stirling Albion	Ayr United	Peter McKay (Dundee United)	31
1951–52	Clyde (2)	Falkirk	Ayr United	Billy McPhail (Clyde)	36
1952–53	Stirling Albion	Hamilton Academical	Queen's Park	James Cunningham (Alloa Athletic)	26
1953–54	Motherwell	Kilmarnock	Third Lanark	Jimmy Inglis (Cowdenbeath); Ian Roger (St Johnstone)	29
1954–55	Airdrieonians (2)	Dunfermline Athletic	Hamilton Academical	Hugh Baird (Airdrieonians)	34

== Scottish Football League Division Two (1955–1975) ==
Season	Winner	Runner-up	Third	Top scorer	
Season	Winner	Runner-up	Third	Player	Goals
1955–56	Queen's Park (2)	Ayr United	St Johnstone	Peter Price (Ayr United)	41
1956–57	Clyde (3)	Third Lanark	Cowdenbeath	Basil Keogh (Clyde)	36
1957–58	Stirling Albion (2)	Dunfermline Athletic	Arbroath	Peter Price (Ayr United)	45
1958–59	Ayr United (5)	Arbroath	Stenhousemuir	David Easson (Arbroath)	45
1959–60	St Johnstone (2)	Dundee United	Queen of the South	John Liddell (St Johnstone)	26
1960–61	Stirling Albion (3)	Falkirk	Stenhousemuir	David Campbell (Stenhousemuir)	30
1961–62	Clyde (4)	Queen of the South	Morton	Peter Smith (Alloa Athletic)	30
1962–63	St Johnstone (3)	East Stirlingshire	Morton	Allan McGraw (Morton)	29
1963–64	Morton (2)	Clyde	Arbroath	Allan McGraw (Morton)	51
1964–65	Stirling Albion (4)	Hamilton Academical	Queen of the South	William Forsyth (Hamilton Academical)	33
1965–66	Ayr United (6)	Airdrieonians	Queen of the South	Tommy Murray (Airdrieonians)	33
1966–67	Morton (3)	Raith Rovers	Arbroath	Joe Mason (Morton)	34
1967–68	St Mirren	Arbroath	East Fife	Dennis Bruce (Arbroath)	32
1968–69	Motherwell (2)	Ayr United	East Fife	John Deans (Motherwell)	30
1969–70	Falkirk (2)	Cowdenbeath	Queen of the South	John Dickson (Cowdenbeath)	31
1970–71	Partick Thistle (3)	East Fife	Arbroath	Jimmy Jack (Arbroath); Kenny Wilson (Dumbarton)	28
1971–72	Dumbarton (2)	Arbroath	Stirling Albion	Kenny Wilson (Dumbarton)	38
1972–73	Clyde (5)	Dunfermline Athletic	Stirling Albion	Brian Third (Montrose)	28
1973–74	Airdrieonians (3)	Kilmarnock	Hamilton Academical	Ian Fleming (Kilmarnock)	32
1974–75	Falkirk (3)	Queen of the South	Montrose	Ian Reid (Queen of the South)	27

== Scottish Football League First Division (1975–2013) ==
Season	Winner	Runner-up	Third	Top scorer	
Season	Winner	Runner-up	Third	Player	Goals
1975–76	Partick Thistle (4)	Kilmarnock	Montrose	John Bourke (Dumbarton); John Whiteford (Falkirk)	17
1976–77	St Mirren (2)	Clydebank	Dundee	Billy Pirie (Dundee)	36
1977–78	Morton (4)	Heart of Midlothian	Dundee	Billy Pirie (Dundee)	35
1978–79	Dundee (2)	Kilmarnock	Clydebank	Blair Millar (Clydebank)	28
1979–80	Heart of Midlothian	Airdrieonians	Ayr United	John Brogan (St Johnstone); Sandy Clark (Airdrieonians)	22
1980–81	Hibernian (4)	Dundee	St Johnstone	Ally McCoist (St Johnstone)	22
1981–82	Motherwell (3)	Kilmarnock	Heart of Midlothian	Blair Millar (Clydebank)	20
1982–83	St Johnstone (4)	Heart of Midlothian	Clydebank	Bobby Williamson (Clydebank)	23
1983–84	Morton (5)	Dumbarton	Partick Thistle	Derek Frye (Clyde); John McNeil (Morton)	17
1984–85	Motherwell (4)	Clydebank	Falkirk	Gerry McCoy (Falkirk)	22
1985–86	Hamilton Academical (2)	Falkirk	Kilmarnock	Ken Eadie (Brechin City)	22
1986–87	Morton (6)	Dunfermline Athletic	Dumbarton	Rowan Alexander (Morton)	23
1987–88	Hamilton Academical (3)	Meadowbank Thistle	Clydebank	Gordon Dalziel (Raith Rovers)	25
1988–89	Dunfermline Athletic (2)	Falkirk	Clydebank	Kenny MacDonald (Airdrieonians)	22
1989–90	St Johnstone (5)	Airdrieonians	Clydebank	Ken Eadie (Clydebank)	21
1990–91	Falkirk (4)	Airdrieonians	Dundee	Gordon Dalziel (Raith Rovers)	25
1991–92	Dundee (3)	Partick Thistle	Hamilton Academical	Gordon Dalziel (Raith Rovers)	26
1992–93	Raith Rovers (5)	Kilmarnock	Dunfermline Athletic	Gordon Dalziel (Raith Rovers)	33
1993–94	Falkirk (5)	Dunfermline Athletic	Airdrieonians	Peter Duffield (Hamilton Academical)	19
1994–95	Raith Rovers (6)	Dunfermline Athletic	Dundee	Peter Duffield (Hamilton Academical)	20
1995–96	Dunfermline Athletic (3)	Dundee United	Greenock Morton	George O'Boyle (St Johnstone)	21
1996–97	St Johnstone (6)	Airdrieonians	Dundee	Roddy Grant (St Johnstone)	19
1997–98	Dundee (4)	Falkirk	Raith Rovers	James Grady (Dundee)	15
1998–99	Hibernian (5)	Falkirk	Ayr United	Glynn Hurst (Ayr United)	18
1999–2000	St Mirren (3)	Dunfermline Athletic	Falkirk	Mark Yardley (St Mirren)	19
2000–01	Livingston	Ayr United	Falkirk	Dennis Wyness (Inverness Caledonian Thistle)	24
2001–02	Partick Thistle (5)	Airdrieonians	Ayr United	Owen Coyle (Airdrieonians)	23
2002–03	Falkirk (6)	Clyde	St Johnstone	Owen Coyle (Falkirk)	20
2003–04	Inverness Caledonian Thistle	Clyde	St Johnstone	Ian Harty (Clyde)	15
2004–05	Falkirk (7)	St Mirren	Clyde	Darryl Duffy (Falkirk)	17
2005–06	St Mirren (4)	St Johnstone	Hamilton Academical	Bryan Prunty (Airdrie United); Jason Scotland (St Johnstone)	15
2006–07	Gretna	St Johnstone	Dundee	Colin McMenamin (Gretna)	20
2007–08	Hamilton Academical (4)	Dundee	St Johnstone	Richard Offiong (Hamilton Academical)	19
2008–09	St Johnstone (7)	Partick Thistle	Dunfermline Athletic	Stephen Dobbie (Queen of the South)	24
2009–10	Inverness Caledonian Thistle (2)	Dundee	Dunfermline Athletic	Adam Rooney (Inverness Caledonian Thistle)	24
2010–11	Dunfermline Athletic (4)	Raith Rovers	Falkirk	Mark Stewart (Falkirk); Kris Doolan (Partick Thistle)	15
2011–12	Ross County	Dundee	Falkirk	Colin McMenamin (Ross County)	19
2012–13	Partick Thistle (6)	Greenock Morton	Falkirk	Stevie May (Hamilton Academical)	25

== Scottish Championship (2013–) ==
Season	Winner	Runner-up	Third	Top scorer	
Season	Winner	Runner-up	Third	Player	Goals
2013–14	Dundee (5)	Hamilton Academical	Falkirk	Rory Loy (Falkirk)	20
2014–15	Heart of Midlothian (2)	Hibernian	Rangers	Jason Cummings (Hibernian)	18
2015–16	Rangers	Falkirk	Hibernian	Martyn Waghorn (Rangers)	20
2016–17	Hibernian (6)	Falkirk	Dundee United	Jason Cummings (Hibernian); Stephen Dobbie (Queen of the South)	19
2017–18	St Mirren (5)	Livingston	Dundee United	Stephen Dobbie (Queen of the South)	18
2018–19	Ross County (2)	Dundee United	Inverness Caledonian Thistle	Lawrence Shankland (Ayr United)	24
2019–20	Dundee United (3)	Inverness Caledonian Thistle	Dundee	Lawrence Shankland (Dundee United)	24
2020–21	Heart of Midlothian (3)	Dundee	Raith Rovers	Liam Boyce (Heart of Midlothian)	14
2021–22	Kilmarnock (3)	Arbroath	Inverness Caledonian Thistle	Michael McKenna (Arbroath)	15
2022–23	Dundee (6)	Ayr United	Queen's Park	Dipo Akinyemi (Ayr United)	20
2023–24	Dundee United (4)	Raith Rovers	Partick Thistle	Brian Graham (Partick Thistle)	20
2024–25	Falkirk (8)	Livingston	Ayr United	Brian Graham (Partick Thistle)	15
2025–26	St Johnstone (8)	Partick Thistle	Arbroath	Josh McPake (St Johnstone)	16

== Total titles won ==
As of 4 May 2025

- Clubs participating in the 2026–27 Scottish Championship are denoted in **bold** type.
- Clubs no longer active are denoted in italics.

Club	Winners	Runners-up	Third
Falkirk	8	9	7
St Johnstone	8	3	6
**Ayr United**	6	5	7
Dundee	6	5	7
**Raith Rovers**	6	5	3
**Greenock Morton**	6	4	5
**Partick Thistle**	6	4	2
Hibernian	6	1	1
Clyde	5	6	3
St Mirren	5	2	—
**Dunfermline Athletic**	4	9	7
Dundee United	4	4	3
Hamilton Academical	4	3	6
Stirling Albion	4	2	2
Motherwell	4	2	1
Airdrieonians (1878)	3	9	4
Kilmarnock	3	6	3
Leith Athletic	3	4	1
Cowdenbeath	3	3	1
Heart of Midlothian	3	2	1
Dumbarton	2	2	2
Third Lanark	2	2	1
**Inverness Caledonian Thistle**	2	1	2
Abercorn	2	1	1
**Queen's Park**	2	1	1
St Bernard's	2	—	4
Ross County	2	—	—
Queen of the South	1	3	4
Albion Rovers	1	3	3
East Fife	1	2	4
**Livingston**	1	2	—
Port Glasgow Athletic	1	1	3
East Stirlingshire	1	1	1
Alloa Athletic	1	1	—
Rangers	1	—	1
Bo'ness	1	—	—
Gretna	1	—	—
**Arbroath**	—	5	7
Clydebank (1965)	—	2	5
Clydebank (1914)	—	2	1
Vale of Leven	—	2	—
Ayr	—	1	2
Arthurlie	—	1	—
Cowlairs	—	1	—
Meadowbank Thistle	—	1	—
Montrose	—	—	2
Renton	—	—	2
**Stenhousemuir**	—	—	2
Armadale	—	—	1
Bathgate	—	—	1
King's Park	—	—	1
