= East Stirlingshire F.C. league record by opponent =

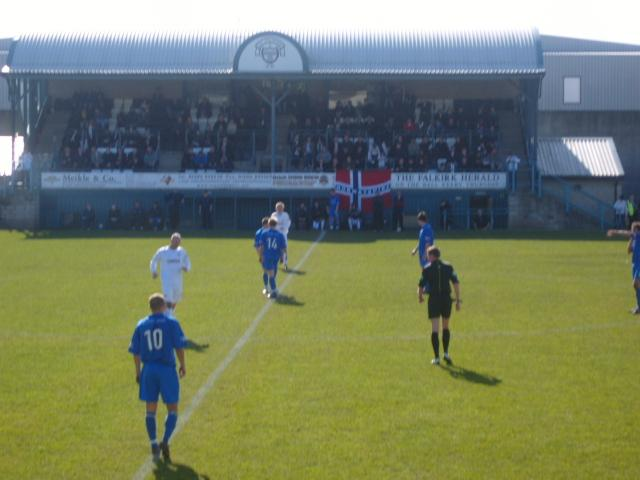
East Stirlingshire players prior to kick-off in a league match against Montrose in April 2008.

East Stirlingshire Football Club is a Scottish association football club from Falkirk. The club was formed in 1881, with its origins traced to the previous year when a local cricket club from Bainsford formed a footballing section under the name Britannia. After spending their first ten seasons solely participating in cup tournaments and friendlies, East Stirlingshire competed in regional leagues between 1891 and 1899, including the Central Football Combination and the Midland Football League. In 1900, the club was elected to the second-tier of Scotland's main national league competition – the Scottish Football League. The club remained in the Scottish Football League Division Two until 1914–15, when the league was suspended due to the outbreak of World War I. The league was restarted in 1921–22 and after a solitary season in the third-tier in 1923–24, East Stirlingshire remained in the second-tier until 1932–33 when the club was promoted to the top-tier for the first time but were relegated after one season. Between 1939 and 1955, the club spent only three seasons in the Scottish Football League after being refused entry to its second-tier after the end of World War II and did not join again until the 1955–56 when the number of teams in the league was expanded. The club remained in the Scottish Football League until the 2012–13 season, when it merged with the Scottish Premier League to create a new governing body called the Scottish Professional Football League.

East Stirlingshire's first team record against each club it has faced in the Scottish Football League and Scottish Professional Football League is listed below. East Stirlingshire's first Scottish Football League match was against Airdrieonians in 1900, and they met their 72nd and most recent different league opponent, Annan Athletic, for the first time in the 2008–09 season. The team East Stirlingshire has played the most in league competitions is Albion Rovers from Coatbridge, whom they met for the first time in the 1903–04 season. As well as the most matches, East Stirlingshire has won, drawn and lost more league games against Albion Rovers than any other opponent with 65 wins, 40 draws and 95 losses from 200 encounters.

== Key ==
- The table includes results of matches played by East Stirlingshire in the Scottish Football League and the Scottish Professional Football League. Matches from regional leagues and various wartime competitions are excluded.
- The name used for each opponent is the name they had when East Stirlingshire most recently played a league match against them. Results against each opponent include results against that club under any former name. For example, results against Dundee United include matches played against Dundee Hibernian (1909–1923).
- The columns headed "First" and "Last" contain the first and most recent seasons in which East Stirlingshire played league matches against each opponent.
- P = matches played; W = matches won; D = matches drawn; L = matches lost; Win% = percentage of total matches won
- † Clubs with this background and symbol in the "Opponent" column are East Stirlingshire's divisional rivals in the current season.
- ‡ Clubs with this background and symbol in the "Opponent" column are defunct.

== All-time league record ==
Statistics correct up to match played on 8 March 2014 (East Stirlingshire 1–0 Stirling Albion).

East Stirlingshire F.C. league record by opponent
Club	P	W	D	L	P	W	D	L	P	W	D	L	Win%	First	Last	Notes
Club	Home				Away				Total				Win%	First	Last	Notes
Abercorn ‡	15	10	3	2	15	0	4	11	30	10	7	13	33.33	1900–01	1913–14	
Aberdeen	3	2	0	1	3	1	0	2	6	3	0	3	50.00	1904–05	1963–64	
Airdrieonians (1878) ‡	11	2	3	6	11	0	0	11	22	2	3	17	9.09	1900–01	1973–74	
Albion Rovers †	103	44	21	38	97	21	19	57	200	65	40	95	32.50	1903–04	2013–14	
Alloa Athletic	64	24	14	26	61	18	15	28	125	42	29	54	33.60	1921–22	2011–12	
Annan Athletic †	11	4	3	4	12	4	1	7	23	8	4	11	34.78	2008–09	2013–14	
Arbroath	61	27	8	26	61	9	14	38	122	36	22	64	29.51	1921–22	2010–11	
Armadale ‡	10	5	3	2	10	1	4	5	20	6	7	7	30.00	1921–22	1931–32	
Arthurlie ‡	20	11	6	3	20	6	6	8	40	17	12	11	42.50	1901–02	1928–29	
Ayr ‡	10	4	3	3	10	2	1	7	20	6	4	10	30.00	1900–01	1908–09	
Ayr Parkhouse ‡	5	5	0	0	5	1	0	4	10	6	0	4	60.00	1903–04	1909–10	
Ayr United	24	12	2	10	24	1	6	17	48	13	8	27	27.08	1910–11	1987–88	
Bathgate ‡	6	4	1	1	6	1	3	2	12	5	4	3	41.67	1921–22	1927–28	
Beith ‡	1	1	0	0	1	0	0	1	2	1	0	1	50.00	1923–24	1923–24	
Berwick Rangers †	66	25	15	26	65	16	17	32	131	41	32	58	31.30	1955–56	2013–14	
Bo'ness ‡	9	3	2	4	9	5	0	4	18	8	2	8	44.44	1921–22	1931–32	
Brechin City	54	27	15	12	56	12	16	28	110	39	31	40	35.45	1923–24	2001–02	
Broxburn United ‡	4	1	0	3	4	0	1	3	8	1	1	6	12.50	1921–22	1925–26	
Celtic	2	0	0	2	2	0	0	2	4	0	0	4	0.00	1932–33	1963–64	
Clackmannan ‡	2	2	0	0	2	0	0	2	4	2	0	2	50.00	1921–22	1923–24	
Clyde †	25	8	6	11	26	4	5	17	51	12	11	28	23.53	1901–02	2013–14	
Clydebank (1914) ‡	8	7	0	1	8	3	0	5	16	10	0	6	62.50	1914–15	1930–31	
Clydebank (1965) ‡	13	5	2	6	13	4	3	6	26	9	5	12	34.62	1966–67	1981–82	
Cowdenbeath	81	35	18	28	84	20	18	46	165	55	36	74	33.33	1905–06	2008–09	
Dumbarton	64	40	10	14	64	10	12	42	128	50	22	56	39.06	1906–07	2008–09	
Dumbarton Harp ‡	1	1	0	0	1	0	1	0	2	1	1	0	50.00	1923–24	1923–24	
Dundee	5	1	0	4	4	1	0	3	9	2	0	7	22.22	1932–33	1980–81	
Dundee United	23	11	7	5	23	4	4	15	46	15	11	20	32.61	1910–11	1963–64	^{[A]}
Dunfermline Athletic	30	11	6	13	30	2	4	24	60	13	10	37	21.67	1912–13	1985–86	
Dykehead ‡	1	1	0	0	1	0	0	1	2	1	0	1	50.00	1923–24	1923–24	
East Fife	60	27	8	25	58	7	14	37	118	34	22	62	28.81	1921–22	2007–08	
Edinburgh City (1928) ‡	7	4	1	2	7	6	1	0	14	10	2	2	71.43	1931–32	1938–39	
Elgin City †	28	13	5	10	27	9	3	15	55	22	8	25	40.00	2000–01	2013–14	
Falkirk	18	4	5	9	17	4	3	10	35	8	8	19	22.86	1902–03	1981–82	
Forfar Athletic	60	34	7	19	58	12	12	34	118	46	19	53	38.98	1921–22	2009–10	
Galston ‡	1	1	0	0	1	1	0	0	2	2	0	0	100.00	1923–24	1923–24	
Greenock Morton	19	7	5	7	19	1	3	15	38	8	8	22	21.05	1927–28	2002–03	^{[B]}
Gretna ‡	6	0	0	6	6	0	1	5	12	0	1	11	0.00	2002–03	2004–05	
Hamilton Academical	31	10	5	16	31	4	7	20	62	14	12	36	22.58	1900–01	2000–01	
Heart of Midlothian	3	0	0	3	4	1	0	3	7	1	0	6	14.29	1932–33	1981–82	
Helensburgh ‡	1	1	0	0	1	0	1	0	2	1	1	0	50.00	1923–24	1923–24	
Hibernian	3	1	1	1	4	0	2	2	7	1	3	3	14.29	1931–32	1980–81	
Inverness Caledonian Thistle	6	2	1	3	6	1	3	2	12	3	4	5	25.00	1994–95	1996–97	^{[C]}
Johnstone ‡	6	3	2	1	6	1	1	4	12	4	3	5	33.33	1912–13	1924–25	
Kilmarnock	7	3	0	4	7	0	0	7	14	3	0	11	21.43	1932–33	1989–90	
King's Park ‡	16	7	6	3	16	6	4	6	32	13	10	9	40.63	1921–22	1938–39	
Leith Athletic ‡	24	9	10	5	24	7	3	14	48	16	13	19	33.33	1900–01	1938–39	
Livingston	17	7	1	9	19	7	4	8	36	14	5	17	38.89	1974–75	2009–10	^{[D]}
Lochgelly United ‡	3	3	0	0	3	0	0	3	6	3	0	3	50.00	1914–15	1922–23	
Mid-Annandale ‡	1	1	0	0	1	1	0	0	2	2	0	0	100.00	1923–24	1923–24	
Montrose †	81	41	15	25	81	20	14	47	162	61	29	72	37.65	1923–24	2013–14	
Motherwell	9	2	2	5	9	2	2	5	18	4	4	10	22.22	1900–01	1981–82	
Nithsdale Wanderers ‡	3	3	0	0	3	1	1	1	6	4	1	1	66.67	1923–24	1926–27	
Partick Thistle	4	1	0	3	4	0	0	4	8	1	0	7	12.50	1901–02	1970–71	
Peebles Rovers	1	1	0	0	1	1	0	0	2	2	0	0	100.00	1923–24	1923–24	
Peterhead †	16	5	1	10	16	2	1	13	32	7	2	23	21.88	2000–01	2013–14	
Port Glasgow Athletic ‡	3	1	0	2	3	0	0	3	6	1	0	5	16.67	1900–01	1910–11	
Queen of the South	39	15	10	14	40	12	8	20	79	27	18	34	34.18	1923–24	1993–94	
Queen's Park †	78	30	17	31	79	15	17	47	157	45	34	78	28.66	1922–23	2013–14	
Raith Rovers	37	11	10	16	35	3	7	25	72	14	17	41	19.44	1902–03	1986–87	
Rangers	4	0	0	4	4	0	0	4	8	0	0	8	0.00	1932–33	2012–13	
Ross County	10	1	2	7	10	3	3	4	20	4	5	11	20.00	1994–95	1998–99	
Royal Albert	1	0	1	0	1	1	0	0	2	1	1	0	50.00	1923–24	1923–24	
Solway Star ‡	1	0	1	0	1	0	1	0	2	0	2	0	0.00	1923–24	1923–24	
St Bernard's ‡	31	18	8	5	31	7	5	19	62	25	13	24	40.32	1900–01	1937–38	
St Johnstone	24	6	9	9	25	2	4	19	49	8	13	28	16.33	1911–12	1987–88	
St Mirren	8	7	1	0	8	2	0	6	16	9	1	6	56.25	1932–33	1974–75	
Stenhousemuir	71	24	17	30	75	19	19	37	146	43	36	67	29.45	1921–22	2008–09	
Stirling Albion †	41	12	9	20	40	5	8	27	81	17	17	47	20.99	1948–49	2013–14	
Stranraer	52	18	13	21	56	12	12	32	108	30	25	53	27.78	1955–56	2011–12	
Third Lanark ‡	12	5	3	4	12	3	3	6	24	8	6	10	33.33	1925–26	1966–67	
Vale of Leven ‡	12	9	2	1	12	0	4	8	24	9	6	9	37.50	1905–06	1922–23	

== Footnotes ==
A. Includes record against Dundee Hibernian
B. Includes record against Morton
C. Includes record against Caledonian Thistle
D. Includes record against Meadowbank Thistle
