= List of Cowdenbeath F.C. seasons =

This is a list of Cowdenbeath Football Club's seasons since their admission to the Scottish Football League in 1905–06 to the present day. The list details Cowdenbeath's record in major league and cup competitions and includes the top scorers for each season where available.

== Seasons ==
Season	League									Scottish Cup	League Cup (Note: Cup of associated leagues)	Challenge Cup (Note: Established season 1990/91)	Top league goalscorer	
Season	Division	P	W	D	L	F	A	Pts	Pos	Scottish Cup	League Cup	Challenge Cup	Name	Goals
1905–06	SFL2	22	7	3	12	28	40	17	10th	DNQ (Note: During the early days of the Scottish Cup non-league clubs needed to qualify via the Qualifying Cup. For this purpose the Second Division was considered non-league.)				
1906–07	SFL2	22	10	5	7	36	40	23	7th	R1				
1907–08	SFL2	22	5	4	13	26	35	14	12th	DNQ				
1908–09	SFL2	22	4	4	14	19	42	12	11th	DNQ				
1909–10	SFL2	22	7	3	12	22	34	17	11th	DNQ				
1910–11	SFL2	22	9	5	8	31	27	23	5th	DNQ				
1911–12	SFL2	22	12	2	8	39	31	26	4th	DNQ				
1912–13	SFL2	26	12	6	8	36	27	30	5th	DNQ				
1913–14	SFL2	22	13	5	4	34	17	31	1st	DNQ				
1914–15	SFL2	26	16	5	5	49	17	37	1st	NH				
1915–16	EFL (Note: During World War I the Second Division was suspended. Cowdenbeath joined one of the regional leagues the Eastern Football League (Scotland).)	22	12	3	7	38	20	27	3rd	NH				
1916–17	EFL	18	11	5	2	45	19	27	1st	NH				
1917–18	EFL	24	15	3	6	49	18	33	1st	NH				
No football played between season 1918–19 due to World War I (Note: Eastern League decided to close down until the end of the conflict)
1919–20	EFL	18	10	4	4	36	32	24	3rd	R1				
1920–21	CFL (Note: The Second Division wasn't restarted after the War. The second division clubs joined the recreated Central Football League. This lasted one season only before the Scottish Second Division was restarted.)	34	20	6	8	64	37	46	3rd	DNQ				
1921–22	SFL2	38	19	9	10	57	30	47	2nd	R2				
1922–23	SFL2	38	16	6	16	56	52	36	11th	R2				
1923–24	SFL2	38	23	9	6	78	33	55	2nd	R2				
1924–25	SFL1	38	16	10	12	76	65	42	5th	R1				
1925–26	SFL1	38	18	6	14	87	68	42	7th	R1				
1926–27	SFL1	38	18	6	14	74	60	42	7th	R2				
1927–28	SFL1	38	16	7	15	66	68	39	9th	R2				
1928–29	SFL1	38	14	5	19	55	69	33	13th	R2				
1929–30	SFL1	38	13	7	18	64	74	33	16th	R2				
1930–31	SFL1	38	17	7	14	58	65	41	7th	QF				
1931–32	SFL1	38	15	8	15	66	78	38	12th	R2				
1932–33	SFL1	38	10	5	23	65	111	25	17th	R1				
1933–34	SFL1	38	5	5	28	58	118	15	20th	R3				
1934–35	SFL2	34	13	6	15	84	75	32	12th	R1				
1935–36	SFL2	34	13	5	16	76	77	31	10th	R3				
1936–37	SFL2	34	14	10	10	75	59	38	6th	R3				
1937–38	SFL2	34	17	9	8	115	71	43	6th	R2				
1938–39	SFL2	34	28	4	2	120	45	60	1st	R2				
1939–40	SFL1	5	1	0	4	6	18	2	20th (Note: League suspended due to outbreak of World War 2; clubs joined 1939–40 Scottish War Emergency League.)	NA (Note: Scottish Cup was suspended due to outbreak of World War 2. It returned in 1945–46 with the Victory Cup, the following season the Scottish Cup restarted in full.)				
1939–40	ED (Note: Cowdenbeath joined the Emergency Eastern Division however withdrew and closed down until after the war due to heavy financial losses)	15	7	1	7	38	44	15	16th					
No football played by club between season 1940–41 and 1944–45 due to World War II (Note: Cowdenbeath did not enter Wartime Leagues and choose to close down for duration of conflict)
1945–46	SFLB (Note: After the war Cowdenbeath joined the Southern Football League (Scotland) for the Victory season.)	26	8	5	13	43	62	21	10th	VC R1	R1 (Note: An end of season Cup competition was introduced in 1940-41, called the Southern League Cup. This became the League Cup in 1946-47.)			
1946–47	SFL 2 (Note: The Scottish Football League was restarted in 1946–47. The league decided to follow the previous season's Southern League format. This meant Cowdenbeath were put into the Second Division, despite qualifying for the First Division before the war.)	26	6	6	14	44	77	18	14th	R3	R1			
1947–48	SFL 2	30	12	8	10	56	53	32	5th	R2	R1			
1948–49	SFL 2	30	9	5	16	53	58	23	13th	R2	R1			
1949–50	SFL 2	30	16	3	11	63	56	35	5th	R2	QF			
1950–51	SFL 2	30	12	3	15	61	57	27	11th	R1	R1			
1951–52	SFL 2	30	12	8	10	66	67	32	8th	R2	R1			
1952–53	SFL 2	30	8	7	15	37	54	23	13th	R2	R1			
1953–54	SFL 2	30	9	5	16	67	81	23	13th	R2	R1			
1954–55	SFL 2	30	8	5	17	55	72	21	14th	R4	R1			
1955–56	SFL 2	36	16	7	13	80	85	39	7th	R5	R1			
1956–57	SFL 2	36	20	5	11	87	65	45	3rd	R4	QF			
1957–58	SFL 2	36	17	8	11	100	85	42	6th	R1	R1			
1958–59	SFL 2	36	13	5	18	67	79	31	14th	R1	QF			
1959–60	SFL 2	36	6	2	28	42	124	14	19th	R3	SF			
1960–61	SFL 2	36	17	6	13	71	65	40	8th	R2	SR			
1961–62	SFL 2	36	11	9	16	65	77	31	14th	R1	R1			
1962–63	SFL 2	36	15	7	14	72	61	37	8th	R2	R1			
1963–64	SFL 2	36	7	11	18	46	72	25	17th	R1	R1			
1964–65	SFL 2	36	11	10	15	55	62	32	12th	R1	R1			
1965–66	SFL 2	36	15	7	14	69	68	37	10th	R2	R1			
1966–67	SFL 2	38	16	8	14	70	55	40	6th	R1	R1			
1967–68	SFL 2	36	12	8	16	57	62	32	12th	R1	R1			
1968–69	SFL 2	36	12	5	19	54	67	29	12th	R1	R1			
1969–70	SFL 2	36	24	7	5	81	35	55	2nd	PR1	R1			
1970–71	SFL 1	34	7	3	24	33	69	17	18th	R4	SF			
1971–72	SFL 2	36	19	10	7	69	28	48	5th	R3	R1			
1972–73	SFL 2	36	14	10	12	57	53	38	7th	R3	R1			
1973–74	SFL 2	36	11	9	16	59	85	31	13th	R3	R1			
1974–75	SFL 2	38	5	11	22	39	76	21	19th	R2	R1			
1975–76	SFL 2	26	11	7	8	44	43	29	5th	R4	SR			
1976–77	SFL 2	39	13	5	21	46	64	31	12th	R1	R1			
1977–78	SFL 2	39	13	8	18	75	78	34	10th	R3	R2			
1978–79	SFL 2	39	16	10	13	63	58	42	5th	R2	R2			
1979–80	SFL 2	39	14	12	13	54	52	40	8th	R3	R2			
1980–81	SFL 2	39	18	9	12	63	48	45	3rd	R4	R2			
1981–82	SFL 2	39	11	13	15	51	57	35	8th	R2	R1			
1982–83	SFL 2	39	13	12	14	54	53	38	8th	R1	SR			
1983–84	SFL 2	39	10	9	20	44	58	29	13th	R3	R2			
1984–85	SFL 2	39	18	11	10	68	39	47	4th	R3	QF			
1985–86	SFL 2	39	14	9	16	52	53	37	10th	R1	R2			
1986–87	SFL 2	39	16	8	15	59	55	40	7th	R1	R1			
1987–88	SFL 2	39	9	13	17	50	67	31	11th	R3	R1			
1988–89	SFL 2	39	13	14	12	48	52	38	8th	R2	R2			
1989–90	SFL 2	39	13	13	13	58	54	39	7th	R4	R1			
1990–91	SFL 2	39	18	9	12	64	50	45	3rd	R4	R2	QF		
1991–92	SFL 2	39	22	7	10	74	52	51	2nd	R3	R1	R1		
1992–93	SFL 1	44	3	7	34	32	109	13	12th	R4	R2	R2		
1993–94	SFL 2	39	6	8	25	40	72	20	14th	R3	R2	R2		
1994–94	SFL 3	36	11	7	18	48	60	40	9th	R2	R1	QF		
1995–96	SFL 3	36	10	8	18	45	59	38	8th	R2	R2	R2		
1996–97	SFL 3	36	10	9	17	38	51	39	7th	R3	R1	R1		
1997–98	SFL 3	36	12	2	22	33	57	38	8th	R1	R1	R1		
1998–99	SFL 3	36	9	6	21	35	65	33	9th	R2	R1	NH (Note: Competition not held due to lack of sponsor.)		
1999–00	SFL 3	36	15	9	12	59	43	54	5th	R2	R1	R2		
2000–01	SFL 3	36	23	7	6	58	31	76	2nd	R2	R2	R1		
2001–02	SFL 2	36	11	11	14	49	51	44	8th	R2	R1	R1		
2002–03	SFL 2	36	8	12	16	46	57	36	10th	R3	R2	R1		
2003–04	SFL 3	36	15	10	11	46	39	55	5th	R3	R2	R1		
2004–05	SFL 3	36	14	9	13	54	61	51	3rd	R1	R1	R2		
2005–06	SFL 3	36	24	4	8	81	34	76	1st	R1	R1	R1	Liam Buchanan	17
2006–07	SFL 2	36	13	6	17	59	56	45	6th	R4	R2	R2	Liam Buchanan	20
2007–08	SFL 2	36	10	7	19	47	73	37	9th (Note: Relegated via play-offs.)	R4	R2	R2	Pat Clarke; Denis McLaughlin	6
2008–09	SFL 3	36	18	9	9	48	34	63	2nd	R2	R2	QF	John Gemmell	12
2009–10	SFL 2	36	16	11	9	60	41	59	3rd (Note: Promoted via play-offs.)	R3	R1	R2	Gareth Wardlaw	16
2010–11	SFL 1	36	9	8	19	41	72	35	9th	R3	R1	R2	Greg Stewart	9
2011–12	SFL 2	36	20	11	5	68	29	71	1st	R4	R1	R1	Marc McKenzie	18
2012–13	SFL 1	36	8	12	16	51	65	36	8th	R4	R1	SF	Jamie Stevenson	8
2013–14	Champ	36	11	7	18	50	72	40	9th	R3	R2	R1	Kane Hemmings	18
2014–15	Champ	36	7	4	25	31	86	25	10th	R4	R2	R1		
2015–16	League 1	36	11	6	19	46	72	39	9th	R4	R1	R1	Greig Spence	17
2016–17	League 2	36	9	8	19	40	55	35	10th (Note: Cowdenbeath entered the League Two play-offs; they won in the two-legged final against East Kilbride to remain in League Two.)	R2	Group	R2		
2017–18	League 2	36	4	10	22	23	56	22	10th (Note: Cowdenbeath entered the League Two play-offs; they won in the two-legged final against Cove Rangers to remain in League Two.)	R2	Group	R1	Robbie Buchanan	7
2018–19	League 2	36	12	7	17	46	46	43	6th	R4	Group	R1	David Cox	13
2019–20	League 2	27	12	5	10	37	35	41	4th	R2	Group	R2	David Cox	7
2020–21	League 2	22	5	6	11	15	32	21	9th	R2	Group	N/A	Craig Barr; Brad Smith	2
2021–22	League 2	36	7	8	21	28	49	29	10th (Note: Cowdenbeath entered the League Two play-offs; they lost in the two-legged final against Bonnyrigg Rose Athletic and were relegated to the Lowland Football League.)	R2	Group	R2	Liam Buchanan	6
2022–23	Lowland	36	10	6	20	46	50	36	15th	R1	Group	R1	Scott Sinclair	7
2023–24	Lowland	34	12	10	12	55	56	46	10th	R3	Group	N/A	Jamie Docherty	11
2024–25	Lowland	34	10	12	12	58	62	42	10th	R3	N/A	R3	Jake Sutherland	13
2025–26	Lowland	34	12	9	13	51	53	45	11th	R1	N/A	N/A		

== Key ==
Champions	Runners-up	Promoted	Relegated

- P = Played
- W = Games won
- D = Games drawn
- L = Games lost
- F = Goals for
- A = Goals against
- Pts = Points
- Pos = Final position
- DNQ=Did not qualify
- NH=Not Held
- PR1=Preliminary Round 1
- R1 = Round 1
- R2 = Round 2
- R3 = Round 3
- R4 = Round 4
- R5 = Round 5
- SR = Supplementary Round
- QF = Quarter-finals
- SF = Semi-finals
- CFL = Central Football League
- EFL = Eastern Football League
- ED = Emergency League Eastern Division
- SFL 1 = Scottish First Division
- SFL 2 = Scottish Second Division
- SFL 3 = Scottish Third Division
- SFL B = Southern Football League Division B
- Champ = Scottish Championship
- League 1 = Scottish League One

== Notes ==
T. Cowdenbeath youngest ever player: Peter Kieron McKean 2014/15
