= List of Hamilton Academical F.C. seasons =

This is a list of Hamilton Academical F.C. seasons in Scottish football, from their foundation in 1874 onwards. It details the club's achievements in senior league and cup competitions and the top scorers for each season. The list of top scorers also chronicles how the club's scoring records have progressed throughout its history.

== Summary ==
Chart of yearly table positions of the club in the Scottish league.

Hamilton Academical was formed in late 1874 by the rector and pupils of Hamilton Academy. The club soon became a member of the Scottish Football Association and initially began competing in the Scottish Cup and Qualifying Cup, before joining the Scottish Football League in November 1897 following the resignation of Renton.

It has twice been runners up in the Scottish Cup, in 1910–11 (losing to Celtic after a replay) and in 1934–35 (losing to Rangers). The 1920s and 30s was the most successful period in the history of the Accies, when they achieved their highest finish of 4th in the top tier of Scottish football (also in 1935) and reached the semi-final of the Scottish Cup on three further occasions in 1925, 1930 and 1932.

They maintained their place in the highest division for 33 consecutive seasons from 1906 until the interruption of World War II in 1939; in the first season after the end of conflict, 1946–47, the club was unable to field a competitive side and finished bottom of the table with only 11 points, bringing the long run to an end.

== Seasons ==
Season	League		Scottish Cup	League Cup	Other	Top league scorer	
Season	Division	Position	Scottish Cup	League Cup	Other	Top league scorer	
1874–75	N/A	N/A	First round	N/A	N/A	N/A	
1875–76	N/A	N/A	Second round	N/A	N/A	N/A	
1876–77	N/A	N/A	First round	N/A	N/A	N/A	
1877–78	N/A	N/A	Second round	N/A	N/A	N/A	
1878–79	N/A	N/A	Second round	N/A	N/A	N/A	
1879–80	N/A	N/A	Fourth round	N/A	N/A	N/A	
1880–81	N/A	N/A	Second round	N/A	N/A	N/A	
1881–82	N/A	N/A	Second round	N/A	Lanarkshire Cup winners	N/A	
1882–83	N/A	N/A	First round	N/A	N/A	N/A	
1883–84	N/A	N/A	Third round	N/A	N/A	N/A	
1884–85	N/A	N/A	Third round	N/A	N/A	N/A	
1885–86	N/A	N/A	Did not enter	N/A	N/A	N/A	
1886–87	N/A	N/A	Second round	N/A	N/A	N/A	
1887–88	N/A	N/A	First round	N/A	N/A	N/A	
1888–89 (Note: First season playing home matches at Douglas Park.)	N/A	N/A	Second round	N/A	N/A	N/A	
1889–90	N/A	N/A	First round	N/A	N/A	N/A	
1890–91	Did not enter	N/A	First round	N/A	N/A	N/A	
1891–92	Did not enter	N/A	Pre-qualification round	N/A	N/A	N/A	
1892–93	Did not enter	N/A	Pre-qualification round	N/A	N/A	N/A	
1893–94	Did not enter	N/A	Pre-qualification round	N/A	N/A	N/A	
1894–95	Did not enter	N/A	Pre-qualification round	N/A	Scottish Alliance; 5th	Unknown	Unknown
1895–96	Did not enter	N/A	Did not enter	N/A	Scottish Alliance; 5th	Unknown	Unknown
1896–97	Did not enter	N/A	Did not enter	N/A	Scottish Combination; 5th	Unknown	Unknown
1897–98	Division Two	9th (Note: Hamilton Academical took Renton's place in the league and fulfilled the club's remaining fixtures.)	Did not enter	N/A	N/A	Unknown	Unknown
1898–99	Division Two	5th	Did not enter	N/A	N/A	Unknown	Unknown
1899–1900	Division Two	7th	First round	N/A	N/A	Unknown	Unknown
1900–01	Division Two	8th	Did not enter	N/A	N/A	Unknown	Unknown
1901–02	Division Two	4th	Did not enter	N/A	Lanarkshire Cup winners	Unknown	Unknown
1902–03	Division Two	6th	Second round	N/A	N/A	Unknown	Unknown
1903–04	Division Two	1st	Did not enter	N/A	Glasgow & West of Scotland League; Winners	Unknown	Unknown
1904–05	Division Two	3rd	Did not enter	N/A	Lanarkshire Cup winners	Unknown	Unknown
1905–06	Division Two	4th	Second round	N/A	Lanarkshire Cup winners	Unknown	Unknown
1906–07	Division One	18th	Did not enter	N/A	Glasgow & West of Scotland Shield; Runners-up	Unknown	Unknown
1907–08	Division One	12th	First round	N/A	N/A	Unknown	Unknown
1908–09	Division One	16th	First round	N/A	N/A	Unknown	Unknown
1909–10	Division One	15th	First round	N/A	Lanarkshire Cup winners (Shared)	Unknown	Unknown
1910–11	Division One	16th	Runners-up	N/A	N/A	Unknown	Unknown
1911–12	Division One	12th	First round	N/A	N/A	Unknown	Unknown
1912–13	Division One	10th	Second round	N/A	N/A	Unknown	Unknown
1913–14	Division One	18th	Second round	N/A	N/A	Unknown	Unknown
1914–15	Division One	8th	N/A (Note: The Scottish Cup was not held in the 1914–15, 1915–16, 1916–17, 1917–18 or 1918–19 seasons due to World War I, or the 1939–40, 1940–41, 1941–42, 1942–43, 1943–44, 1944–45 or 1945–46 seasons due to World War II.)	N/A	N/A	Unknown	Unknown
1915–16	Division One	7th	N/A	N/A	N/A	Unknown	Unknown
1916–17	Division One	9th=	N/A	N/A	N/A	Unknown	Unknown
1917–18	Division One	12th	N/A	N/A	N/A	Unknown	Unknown
1918–19	Division One	14th	N/A	N/A	Victory Cup – Second round	Unknown	Unknown
1919–20	Division One	21st	First round	N/A	Lanarkshire Cup winners	Unknown	Unknown
1920–21	Division One	14th	Third round	N/A	N/A	Unknown	Unknown
1921–22	Division One	18th	Quarter-final	N/A	N/A	Unknown	Unknown
1922–23	Division One	18th	Third round	N/A	N/A	Unknown	Unknown
1923–24	Division One	12th	Third round	N/A	Lanarkshire Cup winners	Unknown	Unknown
1924–25	Division One	13th	Semi-final	N/A	N/A	Unknown	Unknown
1925–26	Division One	12th	Second round	N/A	N/A	Unknown	Unknown
1926–27	Division One	15th	Third round	N/A	N/A	Unknown	Unknown
1927–28	Division One	18th	Second round	N/A	N/A	Unknown	Unknown
1928–29	Division One	12th	Second round	N/A	N/A	Unknown	Unknown
1929–30	Division One	13th	Semi-final	N/A	N/A	Unknown	Unknown
1930–31	Division One	10th	Second round	N/A	N/A	Unknown	Unknown
1931–32	Division One	10th	Semi-final	N/A	N/A	Unknown	Unknown
1932–33	Division One	8th	First round	N/A	N/A	Unknown	Unknown
1933–34	Division One	11th	Second round	N/A	Lanarkshire Cup winners	Unknown	Unknown
1934–35	Division One	4th (Note: 4th place in the 1934–35 Scottish Division One is Hamilton's highest-ever league finish.)	Runners-up	N/A	N/A	Unknown	Unknown
1935–36	Division One	6th	First round	N/A	N/A	Unknown	Unknown
1936–37	Division One	8th	Quarter-final	N/A	N/A	David Wilson	34 (Note: Top scorer in division.)
1937–38	Division One	13th	Third round	N/A	N/A	Unknown	Unknown
1938–39	Division One	7th	Second round	N/A	Lanarkshire Cup winners	Unknown	Unknown
1939–40	Emergency League West (Note: The official Scottish Football League was suspended from 1939 to 1946 due to World War II. Unofficial competitions were held.)	3rd	N/A	N/A	Emergency Cup – Second round	Unknown	Unknown
1940–41	Southern League	11th	N/A	Southern League Cup – Group stage	Summer Cup – Quarter-final	Unknown	Unknown
1941–42	Southern League	16th	N/A	Southern League Cup – Group stage	Summer Cup – First round	Unknown	Unknown
1942–43	Southern League	6th	N/A	Southern League Cup – Semi-final	Summer Cup – First round	Unknown	Unknown
1943–44	Southern League	9th	N/A	Southern League Cup – Group stage	Summer Cup – First round	Unknown	Unknown
1944–45	Southern League	9th	N/A	Southern League Cup – Group stage	Summer Cup – First round	Unknown	Unknown
1945–46	Southern League	16th	N/A	Southern League Cup – Group stage	Victory Cup – First round	Unknown	Unknown
1946–47	Division A	16th	First round	Group stage	N/A	Unknown	Unknown
1947–48	Division B	3rd	First round	Quarter-final	N/A	Unknown	Unknown
1948–49	Division B	10th	First round	Semi-final	N/A	Unknown	Unknown
1949–50	Division B	6th	First round	Group stage	N/A	Unknown	Unknown
1950–51	Division B	7th	Second round	Group stage	N/A	Unknown	Unknown
1951–52	Division B	9th	Second round	Group stage	Lanarkshire Cup winners	Unknown	Unknown
1952–53	Division B	2nd	Third round	Group stage	N/A	Unknown	Unknown
1953–54	Division A	16th	Quarter-final	Group stage	N/A	Unknown	Unknown
1954–55	Division B	3rd	Quarter-final	Group stage	N/A	Unknown	Unknown
1955–56	Division Two	11th	Fifth round	Quarter-final	N/A	Unknown	Unknown
1956–57	Division Two	11th	Sixth round	Group stage	N/A	Unknown	Unknown
1957–58	Division Two	10th	First round	Quarter-final	N/A	Unknown	Unknown
1958–59	Division Two	7th	Third round	Group stage	N/A	Unknown	Unknown
1959–60	Division Two	4th	First round	Group stage	N/A	Unknown	Unknown
1960–61	Division Two	6th	Third round	Semi-final	N/A	Unknown	Unknown
1961–62	Division Two	13th	Second round	Quarter-final	N/A	Unknown	Unknown
1962–63	Division Two	4th	Third round	Group stage	N/A	Unknown	Unknown
1963–64	Division Two	13th	Second round	Group stage	N/A	Unknown	Unknown
1964–65	Division Two	2nd	First round	Quarter-final	N/A	Unknown	Unknown
1965–66	Division One	18th	First round	Group stage	N/A	Unknown	Unknown
1966–67	Division Two	4th	Quarter-final	Group stage	N/A	Unknown	Unknown
1967–68	Division Two	11th	First round	Group stage	N/A	Unknown	Unknown
1968–69	Division Two	15th	Preliminary round 2	Quarter-final	N/A	Unknown	Unknown
1969–70	Division Two	19th	First round	Group stage	N/A	Unknown	Unknown
1970–71	Division Two	18th	Second round	Group stage	N/A	Unknown	Unknown
1971–72	Division Two	19th	Third round	Group stage	N/A	Unknown	Unknown
1972–73	Division Two	8th	Fourth round	Group stage	N/A	Unknown	Unknown
1973–74	Division Two	3rd	First round	Group stage	N/A	Unknown	Unknown
1974–75	Division Two	4th (Note: The teams placed 1st–6th were added to the new First Division, but it remained the 2nd tier below the new Premier Division.)	Fourth round	Quarter-final	N/A	Unknown	Unknown
1975–76	First Division	9th	Third round	Group stage	Spring Cup; Quarter-final	Unknown	Unknown
1976–77	First Division	10th	Third round	Group stage	N/A	Unknown	Unknown
1977–78	First Division	7th	Third round	Third round	N/A	Unknown	Unknown
1978–79	First Division	5th	Third round	Third round	N/A	Unknown	Unknown
1979–80	First Division	7th	Third round	Semi-final	N/A	Unknown	Unknown
1980–81	First Division	7th	Third round	Third round	N/A	Unknown	Unknown
1981–82	First Division	7th	Third round	Quarter-final	N/A	Unknown	Unknown
1982–83	First Division	11th	Third round	Group stage	N/A	Unknown	Unknown
1983–84	First Division	9th	Fourth round (Note: First Scottish Cup tie won in 9 years (since 1974–75).)	Second round	N/A	Unknown	Unknown
1984–85	First Division	4th	Third round	Second round	N/A	Unknown	Unknown
1985–86	First Division	1st	Fourth round	Quarter-final	Lanarkshire Cup winners	Unknown	Unknown
1986–87	Premier Division	12th	Fourth round	Third round	N/A	Unknown	Unknown
1987–88	First Division	1st	Fourth round	Second round	N/A	Unknown	Unknown
1988–89	Premier Division	10th	Third round	Third round	N/A	Unknown	Unknown
1989–90	First Division	6th	Third round	Quarter-final	N/A	Unknown	Unknown
1990–91	First Division	6th	Fourth round	Third round	Challenge Cup; Second round	Unknown	Unknown
1991–92	First Division	3rd	Third round	Third round	Challenge Cup; Winners	Unknown	Unknown
1992–93	First Division	5th	Third round	Second round	Challenge Cup; Winners	Unknown	Unknown
1993–94 (Note: Last season playing home matches at Douglas Park.)	First Division	4th (Note: The teams placed 8th–12th were relegated to the Second Division, with a new Third Division below.)	Third round	Second round	Challenge Cup; Second round	Unknown	Unknown
1994–95 (Note: Home matches played at Firhill Stadium, Glasgow.)	First Division	6th	Third round	Third round	Challenge Cup; Second round	Unknown	Unknown
1995–96	First Division	9th	Third round	Second round	Challenge Cup; Second round	Unknown	Unknown
1996–97	Second Division	2nd	Fourth round	Second round	Challenge Cup; Second round	Unknown	Unknown
1997–98 (Note: Home matches played at Cliftonhill Stadium, Coatbridge.)	First Division	8th	Third round	Second round	Challenge Cup – Semi-final Lanarkshire Cup winners	Unknown	Unknown
1998–99	First Division	9th	Fourth round	Second round	N/A (Note: The Scottish Challenge Cup was not held in the 1998–99 season.)	Unknown	Unknown
1999–2000	Second Division	9th (Note: Hamilton Academical were penalised 15 points for breaking league rules (failing to fulfil a fixture against Stenhousemuir, after their players went on strike due to non-payments of wages); they would otherwise have accumulated 44 points and potentially finished 7th.)	Third round	Second round	Challenge Cup; Second round	Unknown	Unknown
2000–01	Third Division	1st	Second round	First round	Challenge Cup – Second round Lanarkshire Cup winners	Unknown	Unknown
2001–02 (Note: First season playing home matches at New Douglas Park.)	Second Division	5th	Fourth round	Second round	Challenge Cup; First round	Unknown	Unknown
2002–03	Second Division	8th	Fourth round	Second round	Challenge Cup; First round	Unknown	Unknown
2003–04	Second Division	2nd	Fourth round	Second round	Challenge Cup; First round	Unknown	Unknown
2004–05	First Division	7th	Third round	Second round	Challenge Cup; First round	Unknown	Unknown
2005–06	First Division	3rd	Quarter-final	Second round	Challenge Cup - Runners-up Lanarkshire Cup winners	Unknown	Unknown
2006–07	First Division	4th	Third round	First round	Challenge Cup; Second round	Unknown	Unknown
2007–08	First Division	1st	Fourth round	Quarter-final	Challenge Cup; First round	Unknown	Unknown
2008–09	SPL	9th	Quarter-final	Quarter-final	Lanarkshire Cup winners	James McCarthy, Simon Mensing, Richard Offiong,	6
2009–10	SPL	7th	Fourth round	Second round	N/A	Simon Mensing	8
2010–11	SPL	12th	Fifth round	Second round	N/A	Mickaël Antoine-Curier	4
2011–12	First Division	4th	Fourth round	Second round	Challenge Cup - Runners-up Lanarkshire Cup winners	Jon McShane	9
2012–13	First Division	5th	Quarter-final	Third round	Challenge Cup; First round	Stevie May	25 (Note: Top scorer in division.)
2013–14	Championship (Note: The leagues were renamed for the 2013–14 season, but the divisions remained as before.)	2nd (Note: Promoted via play-offs)	Third round	Third round	Challenge Cup; First round	Tony Andreu, James Keatings	13
2014–15	Premiership	7th	Fourth round	Quarter-final	N/A	Tony Andreu	12
2015–16	Premiership	10th	Fourth round	Second round	N/A	Carlton Morris	8
2016–17	Premiership	11th (Note: Won in relegation play-offs)	Quarter-final	Second round	N/A	Ali Crawford	8
2017–18	Premiership	10th	Fourth round	Second round	N/A	Dougie Imrie, David Templeton	8
2018–19	Premiership	10th	Fourth round	Group Stage	N/A	Mickel Miller	5
2019–20	Premiership	11th (Note: 2019–20 Scottish Premiership postponed in March 2020 due to the COVID-19 pandemic in Scotland; season curtailed and standings at time of postponement declared final on 18 May 2020.)	Fifth round	Second round	N/A	Marios Ogkmpoe	6
2020–21	Premiership	12th	Third round	Group Stage	N/A	Ross Callachan	8
2021–22	Championship	6th	Third round	Group Stage	Challenge Cup; Quarter-final	Andy Ryan	9
2022–23	Championship	9th (Note: Relegated via play-offs)	Fifth round	Group Stage	Challenge Cup; Winners	Connor Smith, Daniel O'Reilly	5
2023–24	League One	2nd (Note: Promoted via play-offs)	Third round	Group stage	Challenge Cup; Quarter-final	Kevin O'Hara	17
2024–25	Championship	10th (Note: Hamilton Academical were penalised 15 points for multiple breaches of league rules; they would otherwise have accumulated 36 points and potentially finished 6th.)	Fifth round	Group stage	Challenge Cup; Fourth round	Oli Shaw	11

== League performance summary ==
The Scottish Football League was founded in 1890 and, other than during seven years of hiatus during World War II, (Note: The incomplete 1939–40 edition has not been counted in the totals.) the national top division has been played every season since. (Note: The top tier became the Scottish Premier League in 1998, and all four divisions became the Scottish Professional Football League in 2013.) The following is a summary of Hamilton's divisional status:

- 123 total eligible seasons (including 2019–20)
- 47 seasons in top level (Note: Has existed between 1890–1939, and since 1946.)
- 63 seasons in second level (Note: Has existed between 1893–1915, 1921–1939 and since 1946.)
- 5 seasons in third level (Note: Has existed between 1923–1926, 1946–1949, and since 1976.)
- 1 seasons in fourth level (Note: Has existed since 1994.)
- 7 seasons not involved – before club was league member

== Sources ==
- Soccerbase
- FitbaStats
