= List of Clyde F.C. seasons =

This is a list of Clyde Football Club seasons up to the present day. The list details Clyde's record in major league and cup competitions, and the club's top league goal scorer of each season. Top scorers in bold were also the top scorers in Clyde's division that season. Records of regular minor competitions such as the Glasgow Cup are only included for seasons where the club reached a final.

== Summary ==
Founded in 1877, Clyde's most notable achievements were three Scottish Cup victories in 1938–39, 1954–55 and 1957–58. They also reached the final of the competition on three other occasions. The club's highest league finish was 3rd in 1908–09, 1911–12 and 1966–67; after the latter campaign, they were denied entry to the 1967–68 Inter-Cities Fairs Cup as Rangers finished above them and were given the single Fairs Cup place for Glasgow, with only one team per city being allowed to enter under the rules of the time; the Bully Wee thus never played in Europe, with their Scottish Cup wins coming before the inception of the European Cup Winners' Cup.

Chart of the club's yearly table positions in the Scottish league.

Having spent much of their history in Scotland's top level (although something of a 'yo-yo club' with several relegations and promotions), their most recent participation in the top tier – when the Scottish League had just two large divisions and the club was based in Rutherglen – was in 1974–75, the final season of that setup; they immediately dropped down into the new third tier, and thereafter consolidated as one of the clubs who went up and down between the second and third levels regularly. After moving to a new stadium in Cumbernauld in 1994 (having spent eight seasons playing as tenants of other clubs), Clyde came close to gaining promotion to the Scottish Premier League several times in the early 2000s before dropping back down the divisions.

== Seasons ==
Key

Champions	Runners-up	3rd / Semi-final	Promoted	Relegated

- P = Played
- W = Games won
- D = Games drawn
- L = Games lost
- F = Goals for
- A = Goals against
- Pts = Points
- Pos = Final position
- R1 = Round 1
- R2 = Round 2
- R3 = Round 3
- R4 = Round 4
- QF = Quarter-finals
- SF = Semi-finals
- SFL 1 = Scottish First Division
- SFL 2 = Scottish Second Division
- SFL 3 = Scottish Third Division

=== No league football (1877–1891) ===
Season	Scottish Cup	Other	Top scorer	
1877–78 (Note: First season playing home fixtures at Barrowfield Park, Glasgow.)	First round	N/A	Unknown	Unknown
1878–79	Second round	N/A	Unknown	Unknown
1879–80	Fourth round	N/A	Unknown	Unknown
1880–81	Fourth round	N/A	Unknown	Unknown
1881–82	Fifth round	N/A	Unknown	Unknown
1882–83	Second round	Glasgow North Eastern Cup runners-up	Unknown	Unknown
1883–84	First round	N/A	Unknown	Unknown
1884–85	First round	N/A	Unknown	Unknown
1885–86	Second round	Glasgow North Eastern Cup runners-up	Unknown	Unknown
1886–87	Fifth round	N/A	Unknown	Unknown
1887–88	First round	N/A	Unknown	Unknown
1888–89	Fifth round	Glasgow Exhibition Cup; Quarter-final	Unknown	Unknown
1889–90	Second round	N/A	Unknown	Unknown
1889–90	Third round	Glasgow North Eastern Cup winners	Unknown	Unknown

=== Scottish Football League (1891–1939) ===
Season	League		Scottish Cup	League Cup	Other	Top scorer	
Season	Division	Position	Scottish Cup	League Cup	Other	Top scorer	
1891–92	Scottish Football League (Note: The league had only one division until the 1893–94 season.)	8th	First round	N/A	Glasgow Cup runners-up	Unknown	Unknown
1892–93	Scottish Football League	10th	First round	N/A	Glasgow North Eastern Cup winners	Unknown	Unknown
1893–94	Division Two	3rd	Third round	N/A	Glasgow North Eastern Cup winners	Unknown	Unknown
1894–95	Division One	7th	Third round	N/A	Glasgow North Eastern Cup winners	**James Miller**	12 (Note: League goals only; top scorer in division.)
1895–96	Division One	9th	Second round	N/A	N/A	Unknown	Unknown
1896–97	Division One	9th	First round	N/A	N/A	Unknown	Unknown
1897–98 (Note: Last season playing home fixtures at Barrowfield Park.)	Division One	10th	First round	N/A	N/A	Unknown	Unknown
1898–99 (Note: First season playing home fixtures at Shawfield Stadium, Rutherglen.)	Division One	7th	Third round	N/A	N/A	Unknown	Unknown
1899–1900	Division One	10th	Second round	N/A	N/A	Unknown	Unknown
1900–01	Division Two	4th	Second round	N/A	N/A	Unknown	Unknown
1901–02	Division Two	11th	First round	N/A	N/A	Unknown	Unknown
1902–03	Division Two	11th	First round	N/A	N/A	Unknown	Unknown
1903–04	Division Two	2nd	First round	N/A	N/A	Unknown	Unknown
1904–05	Division Two	1st	First round	N/A	Glasgow & West of Scotland League; Winners Scottish Qualifying Cup; Semi-final	Unknown	Unknown
1905–06	Division Two	2nd	First round	N/A	N/A	Unknown	Unknown
1906–07	Division One	8th	First round	N/A	Glasgow & West of Scotland Shield; Winners	Unknown	Unknown
1907–08	Division One	17th	Unknown	N/A	N/A	Unknown	Unknown
1908–09	Division One	3rd	Semi-final	N/A	N/A	Unknown	Unknown
1909–10	Division One	5th	Runners-up	N/A	Charity Cup winners	Unknown	Unknown
1910–11	Division One	7th	Third round	N/A	N/A	Unknown	Unknown
1911–12	Division One	3rd	Runners-up	N/A	Charity Cup runners-up	Unknown	Unknown
1912–13	Division One	9th	Semi-final	N/A	N/A	Unknown	Unknown
1913–14	Division One	9th	Second round	N/A	N/A	Unknown	Unknown
1914–15	Division One	17th	N/A (Note: The Scottish Cup was not held in the 1914–15, 1915–16, 1916–17, 1917–18 or 1918–19 seasons due to World War I, or the 1939–40, 1940–41, 1941–42, 1942–43, 1943–44, 1944–45 or 1945–46 seasons due to World War II.)	N/A	Glasgow Cup winners War Fund Shield; Quarter-final	Unknown	Unknown
1915–16	Division One	16th	N/A	N/A	N/A	Unknown	Unknown
1916–17	Division One	12th	N/A	N/A	Glasgow Cup runners-up	Unknown	Unknown
1917–18	Division One	17th	N/A	N/A	N/A	Unknown	Unknown
1918–19	Division One	16th	N/A	N/A	Victory Cup – Second round	Unknown	Unknown
1919–20	Division One	15th	First round	N/A	N/A	Unknown	Unknown
1920–21	Division One	7th	Second round	N/A	Glasgow Cup runners-up	Unknown	Unknown
1921–22	Division One	10th	Third round	N/A	N/A	Unknown	Unknown
1922–23	Division One	16th	First round	N/A	Glasgow Cup runners-up	Unknown	Unknown
1923–24	Division One	19th	Third round	N/A	N/A	Unknown	Unknown
1924–25	Division Two	3rd	Second round	N/A	Charity Cup runners-up	Unknown	Unknown
1925–26	Division Two	2nd	Third round	N/A	Glasgow Cup winners	Unknown	Unknown
1926–27	Division One	17th	Third round	N/A	N/A	Unknown	Unknown
1927–28	Division One	15th	First round	N/A	N/A	Unknown	Unknown
1928–29	Division One	17th	Third round	N/A	N/A	Unknown	Unknown
1929–30	Division One	11th	Second round	N/A	N/A	Unknown	Unknown
1930–31	Division One	12th	Second round	N/A	N/A	Unknown	Unknown
1931–32	Division One	13th	Fourth round	N/A	N/A	Unknown	Unknown
1932–33	Division One	12th	Semi-final	N/A	N/A	Billy Boyd	32
1933–34	Division One	14th	First round	N/A	Glasgow Cup runners-up	Unknown	Unknown
1934–35	Division One	10th	Second round	N/A	N/A	Unknown	Unknown
1935–36	Division One	18th	Semi-final	N/A	N/A	Unknown	Unknown
1936–37	Division One	10th	Semi-final	N/A	N/A	Unknown	Unknown
1937–38	Division One	15th	First round	N/A	N/A	Unknown	Unknown
1938–39	Division One	9th	Winners	N/A	Glasgow Cup runners-up	Unknown	Unknown

=== War-time League (1939–1946) ===
Season	League		Scottish Cup	League Cup	Other	Top scorer	
Season	Division	Position	Scottish Cup	League Cup	Other	Top scorer	
1939–40	Emergency League West (Note: The official Scottish Football League was suspended from 1939 to 1946 due to World War II. Unofficial competitions were held.)	7th	N/A	N/A	Emergency Cup; Quarter-final Charity Cup winners	Unknown	Unknown
1940–41	Southern League	2nd	N/A	Southern League Cup; Group stage	Summer Cup; Second round	Unknown	Unknown
1941–42	Southern League	5th	N/A	Southern League Cup; Group stage	Summer Cup; First round Glasgow Cup runners-up Charity Cup runners-up	Unknown	Unknown
1942–43	Southern League	4th	N/A	Southern League Cup; Group stage	Summer Cup; First round	Unknown	Unknown
1943–44	Southern League	7th	N/A	Southern League Cup; Semi-final	Summer Cup; Runners-up Glasgow Cup runners-up Charity Cup runners-up	Unknown	Unknown
1944–45	Southern League	4th	N/A	Southern League Cup; Group stage	Summer Cup; First round	Unknown	Unknown
1945–46	Southern League	5th	N/A	Southern League Cup; Quarter-final	Victory Cup; Semi-final Glasgow Cup runners-up	Unknown	Unknown

=== Scottish Football League (1946–1990) ===
Season	League		Scottish Cup	League Cup	Other	Top league scorer	
Season	Division	Position	Scottish Cup	League Cup	Other	Top league scorer	
1946–47	Division A	10th	First round	Group stage	Glasgow Cup winners	Leslie Johnston	15
1947–48	Division A	6th	Third round	Group stage	N/A	Leslie Johnston	14
1948–49	Division A	14th	Runners-up	Group stage	N/A	Archie Wright	13
1949–50	Division A	13th	Second round	Group stage	Glasgow Cup runners-up	Alf Ackerman; Alec Linwood	12
1950–51	Division A	15th	Third round	Group stage	N/A	John Buchanan; Tommy Ring	8
1951–52	Division B	1st	Second round	Group stage	Glasgow Cup winners Charity Cup winners (shared) Supplementary Cup; Winners St Mungo Cup; Quarter-final	Billy McPhail	36
1952–53	Division A	5th	Fourth round	Group stage	N/A	Unknown	Unknown
1953–54	Division A	8th	Second round	Group stage	N/A	Unknown	Unknown
1954–55	Division A	7th	Winners	Group stage	N/A	Unknown	Unknown
1955–56	Division One	17th	Semi-final	Group stage	N/A	Unknown	Unknown
1956–57	Division Two	1st	Quarter-final	Semi-final	Glasgow Cup runners-up	Basil Keogh	36
1957–58	Division One	4th	Winners	Semi-final	Charity Cup winners	Unknown	Unknown
1958–59	Division One	15th	Second round	Group stage	Glasgow Cup winners Charity Cup runners-up	Unknown	Unknown
1959–60	Division One	6th	Semi-final	Group stage	N/A	Unknown	Unknown
1960–61	Division One	17th	First round	Quarter-final	Charity Cup winners (shared) Franco-Scottish Friendship Cup	Unknown	Unknown
1961–62	Division Two	1st	Second round	Group stage	N/A	Unknown	Unknown
1962–63	Division One	17th	Second round	Group stage	Summer Cup – First round	Unknown	Unknown
1963–64	Division Two	2nd	Second round	Group stage	Glasgow Cup runners-up	Unknown	Unknown
1964–65	Division One	7th	First round	Quarter-final	Summer Cup; Group stage	Unknown	Unknown
1965–66	Division One	11th	First round	Group stage	N/A	Unknown	Unknown
1966–67	Division One	3rd	Semi-final	Group stage	Glasgow Cup runners-up	Unknown	Unknown
1967–68	Division One	8th	Second round	Group stage	N/A	Unknown	Unknown
1968–69	Division One	13th	Second round	Semi-final	N/A	Unknown	Unknown
1969–70	Division One	16th	First round	Group stage	N/A	Unknown	Unknown
1970–71	Division One	15th	Fourth round	Group stage	Glasgow Cup runners-up	Unknown	Unknown
1971–72	Division One	17th	Third round	Group stage	N/A	Unknown	Unknown
1972–73	Division Two	2nd	Third round	Group stage	N/A	Unknown	Unknown
1973–74	Division One	15th	Third round	Quarter-final	N/A	Unknown	Unknown
1974–75	Division One	16th (Note: The teams placed 1st–6th were added to the new First Division (below a new Premier Division) with the remaining clubs making up the new Second Division.)	Third round	Group stage	N/A	Unknown	Unknown
1975–76	First Division	14th	Third round	Group stage	Spring Cup; Group stage	Unknown	Unknown
1976–77	Second Division	7th	Third round	Group stage	N/A	Unknown	Unknown
1977–78	Second Division	1st	First round	Second round	N/A	Unknown	Unknown
1978–79	First Division	9th	Third round	Second round	Anglo-Scottish Cup; First round	Unknown	Unknown
1979–80	First Division	14th	Third round	Second round	N/A	Unknown	Unknown
1980–81	Second Division	8th	Third round	Second round	N/A	Unknown	Unknown
1981–82	Second Division	1st	Third round	Group stage	N/A	Danny Masterton	23
1982–83	First Division	10th	Fourth round	Group stage	N/A	Unknown	Unknown
1983–84	First Division	8th	Fourth round	Second round	N/A	Unknown	Unknown
1984–85	First Division	8th	Third round	Second round	N/A	Unknown	Unknown
1985–86 (Note: Last season playing home fixtures at Shawfield Stadium.)	First Division	11th	Third round	Second round	N/A	Unknown	Unknown
1986–87 (Note: First season playing home fixtures at Firhill Stadium, Glasgow.)	First Division	9th	Third round	Third round	N/A	Unknown	Unknown
1987–88	First Division	9th	Fifth round	Third round	N/A	Unknown	Unknown
1988–89	First Division	12th	Third round	Second round	Glasgow Cup runners-up	Unknown	Unknown
1989–90	First Division	9th	Third round	Second round	N/A	Unknown	Unknown

=== Scottish Football League (1990–2013) ===
Season	League									Scottish Cup	League Cup	Challenge Cup	Top league goalscorer	
Season	Division	P	W	D	L	F	A	Pts	Pos	Scottish Cup	League Cup	Challenge Cup	Name	Goals
1990–91 (Note: Last season playing home fixtures at Firhill Stadium.)	First Division								13th	3R	3R	2R	Unknown	Unknown
1991–92 (Note: First season playing home fixtures at Douglas Park, Hamilton.)	Second Division								5th	3R	2R	1R	Unknown	Unknown
1992–93	Second Division								1st	3R	2R	1R	Unknown	Unknown
1993–94 (Note: Last season playing home fixtures at Douglas Park, first playing at Broadwood Stadium, Cumbernauld (moved on 5 February 1994).)	First Division								10th (Note: The teams placed 8th–12th were relegated to the Second Division, with a new Third Division below.)	3R	2R	1R	Unknown	Unknown
1994–95	Second Division								6th	3R	2R	1R	Unknown	Unknown
1995–96	Second Division								5th	4R	1R	1R	Unknown	Unknown
1996–97	Second Division								4th	4R	2R	2R	Unknown	Unknown
1997–98	Second Division								8th	1R	2R	1R	Unknown	Unknown
1998–99	Second Division								3rd	4R	1R	N/A (Note: The Scottish Challenge Cup was not held in the 1998–99 season.)	Unknown	Unknown
1999–2000	Second Division								1st	4R	2R	1R	Brian Carrigan	18
2000–01	First Division								5th	3R	2R	1R	Unknown	Unknown
2001–02	First Division								5th	4R	2R	SF	Unknown	Unknown
2002–03	First Division								2nd	4R	1R	2R	Unknown	Unknown
2003–04	First Division								2nd	4R	3R	2R	Ian Harty	15
2004–05	SFL 1	36	16	12	8	35	29	60	3rd	QF	R3	QF	Ian Harty	15
2005–06	SFL 1	36	15	10	11	54	42	55	5th	R4	R3	R1	Alex Williams	13
2006–07	SFL 1	36	11	14	11	46	35	47	5th	R3	R1	RU	Gary Arbuckle	11
2007–08	SFL 1	36	9	10	17	40	59	37	9th	R4	R1	R2	Pat Clarke	6
2008–09	SFL 1	36	10	9	17	41	58	39	10th	R4	R2	QF	Pat Clarke	11
2009–10	SFL 2	36	8	7	21	37	57	31	10th	R3	R1	R1	Willie Sawyers	10
2010–11	SFL 3	36	8	8	20	37	67	32	10th	R2	R2	R1	Marc McCusker	11
2011–12	SFL 3	36	8	11	17	35	50	35	9th	R2	R2	R1	John Neill	7
2012–13	SFL 3	36	12	4	20	42	66	40	9th	R2	R1	R1		

=== Scottish Professional Football League (2013–) ===
Season	League									Scottish Cup	League Cup	Challenge Cup	Top league goalscorer	
Season	Division	P	W	D	L	F	A	Pts	Pos	Scottish Cup	League Cup	Challenge Cup	Name	Goals
2013–14	League Two	36	17	6	13	50	48	57	4th	R4	R1	R1		
2014–15	League Two	36	13	8	15	40	50	47	6th	R3	R1	R2		
2015–16	League Two	36	17	6	13	56	45	57	3rd	R2	R1	R1	Scott Linton; Sean Higgins	9
2016–17	League Two	36	10	8	18	49	64	38	9th	R5	Group	R1	Peter MacDonald	17
2017–18	League Two	36	14	9	13	52	50	51	5th	R3	Group	R1	David Goodwillie	25
2018–19	League Two	36	23	5	8	63	35	74	2nd	R2	Group	R1	David Goodwillie	17
2019–20	League One	28	9	7	12	35	43	34	7th	R5	Group	QF	David Goodwillie	20
2020–21	League One	22	8	2	12	27	38	26	8th	R4	Group	—	David Goodwillie	9
2021–22	League One	36	9	12	15	39	62	39	8th	R3	Group	R1	David Goodwillie	15
2022–23	League One	36	5	9	22	35	68	24	9th	R3	Group	QF	Jordan Allan	10
2023–24	League Two	36	9	11	16	46	58	38	9th	R4	Group	R1	Martin Rennie	12
2024–25	League Two	36	11	10	15	49	54	43	7th	R2	Group	R2	Martin Rennie	9

== League performance summary ==
The Scottish Football League was founded in 1890 and, other than during seven years of hiatus during World War II, (Note: The incomplete 1939–40 edition has not been counted in the totals.) the national top division has been played every season since. (Note: The top tier became the Scottish Premier League in 1998, and all four divisions became the Scottish Professional Football League in 2013.) The following is a summary of Clyde's divisional status:

- **123** total eligible seasons (including 2019–20)
- **63** seasons in top level (Note: Has existed between 1890–1939, and since 1946.)
- **36** seasons in second level (Note: Has existed between 1893–1915, 1921–1939 and since 1946.)
- **14** seasons in third level (Note: Has existed between 1923–1926, 1946–1949, and since 1976.)
- **9** seasons in fourth level (Note: Has existed since 1994.)
- **1** season not involved – before club was league member
