= List of Dunfermline Athletic F.C. seasons =

Dunfermline Athletic Football Club, an association football club based in Dunfermline, Fife, Scotland, was founded in 1885. The club played in lower leagues until the 1912–13 season when they joined the Scottish Football League in Division Two.

The table below details their achievements in first-team competitions for each completed season since joining the Scottish Football League in 1912–13.

== Key ==
Key to divisions

- Premier Division – Scottish Football League Premier Division
- Premier League – Scottish Premier League
- Division B – Scottish Football League Division B
- Division One – Scottish Football League Division One
- Division Two – Scottish Football League Division Two
- First Division – Scottish Football League First Division
- Second Division – Scottish Football League Second Division
- League One – Scottish League One

Key to symbols

- 1st – Champions
- ↑ – Promoted
- ↓ – Relegated
- † – Top or joint-top league scorer in Dunfermline's division

Key to rounds

- N/A – Competition not held
- QR2 – Second qualifying round
- Group – Group stage
- R1 – First round, etc.
- QF – Quarter-final
- SF – Semi-final
- RU – Runners-up
- W – Winners

== Seasons ==
List of seasons, including league division and statistics, cup results and top scorer where known
| Season | League record | | | | | | | | | Scottish Cup | League Cup (Note: The Scottish League Cup competition started in the 1946–47 season.) | Challenge Cup (Note: The Scottish Challenge Cup competition started in the 1990–91 season.) | European competitions | | Top scorer(s) (Note: Includes goals scored in the Scottish Football League (including play-offs), Scootish Cup, Scottish League Cup, Scottish Challenge Cup, Inter-Cities Fairs Cup, UEFA Cup and UEFA Cup Winners' Cup) | |
| Season | Division | P | W | D | L | F | A | Pts | Pos | Scottish Cup | League Cup | Challenge Cup | Competition | Result | Player(s) | Goals |
|---|---|---|---|---|---|---|---|---|---|---|---|---|---|---|---|---|
| 1912–13 | Division Two | 26 | 13 | 7 | 6 | 45 | 27 | 33 | 2nd | R2 | N/A | N/A | — | — | | |
| 1913–14 | Division Two | 22 | 11 | 4 | 7 | 46 | 28 | 26 | 3rd | — | N/A | N/A | — | — | | |
| 1914–15 | Division Two | 26 | 13 | 2 | 11 | 49 | 39 | 28 | 6th | N/A | N/A | N/A | — | — | | |
No competitive football was played between 1916 and 1920 due to the First World War
| 1921–22 | Division Two | 38 | 14 | 10 | 14 | 56 | 42 | 38 | 8th | R2 | N/A | N/A | — | — | | |
| 1922–23 | Division Two | 38 | 11 | 11 | 16 | 47 | 44 | 33 | 13th | R3 | N/A | N/A | — | — | | |
| 1923–24 | Division Two | 38 | 14 | 11 | 13 | 52 | 45 | 39 | 7th | R1 | N/A | N/A | — | — | | |
| 1924–25 | Division Two | 38 | 14 | 7 | 17 | 62 | 57 | 35 | 13th | R1 | N/A | N/A | — | — | | |
| 1925–26 | Division Two ↑ | 38 | 26 | 7 | 5 | 109 | 43 | 59 | 1st | R1 | N/A | N/A | — | — | Bobby Skinner | 53 |
| 1926–27 | Division One | 38 | 10 | 8 | 20 | 53 | 85 | 28 | 18th | R3 | N/A | N/A | — | — | | |
| 1927–28 | Division One ↓ | 38 | 4 | 4 | 30 | 41 | 126 | 12 | 20th | R4 | N/A | N/A | — | — | | |
| 1928–29 | Division Two | 36 | 13 | 7 | 16 | 66 | 72 | 33 | 11th | R1 | N/A | N/A | — | — | | |
| 1929–30 | Division Two | 38 | 16 | 6 | 16 | 99 | 85 | 38 | 10th | R1 | N/A | N/A | — | — | | |
| 1930–31 | Division Two | 38 | 20 | 7 | 11 | 83 | 50 | 47 | 3rd | R1 | N/A | N/A | — | — | | |
| 1931–32 | Division Two | 38 | 17 | 6 | 15 | 78 | 73 | 40 | 10th | R4 | N/A | N/A | — | — | | |
| 1932–33 | Division Two | 34 | 20 | 7 | 7 | 89 | 44 | 47 | 3rd | R1 | N/A | N/A | — | — | | |
| 1933–34 | Division Two ↑ | 34 | 20 | 4 | 10 | 90 | 52 | 44 | 2nd | R1 | N/A | N/A | — | — | | |
| 1934–35 | Division One | 38 | 13 | 5 | 20 | 56 | 96 | 31 | 15th | R1 | N/A | N/A | — | — | | |
| 1935–36 | Division One | 38 | 13 | 8 | 17 | 73 | 92 | 34 | 10th | QF | N/A | N/A | — | — | | |
| 1936–37 | Division One ↓ | 38 | 5 | 11 | 22 | 65 | 98 | 21 | 19th | R1 | N/A | N/A | — | — | | |
| 1937–38 | Division Two | 34 | 17 | 5 | 12 | 82 | 76 | 39 | 9th | R1 | N/A | N/A | — | — | | |
| 1938–39 | Division Two | 34 | 18 | 5 | 11 | 99 | 78 | 41 | 5th | R3 | N/A | N/A | — | — | | |
| 1939–40 | Division Two | 4 | 2 | 2 | 0 | 10 | 5 | 6 | 2nd (Note: When the Second World War began, the 1939–40 Scottish Football League season was abandoned with four matches played.) | N/A | N/A | N/A | — | — | | |
No competitive football was played between 1939 and 1945 due to the Second World War
| 1946–47 | Division B | 26 | 10 | 3 | 13 | 50 | 72 | 23 | 8th | R1 | R1 | N/A | — | — | | |
| 1947–48 | Division B | 30 | 13 | 3 | 14 | 72 | 71 | 29 | 7th | R2 | R1 | N/A | — | — | | |
| 1948–49 | Division B | 30 | 16 | 9 | 5 | 80 | 58 | 41 | 4th | R1 | R1 | N/A | — | — | | |
| 1949–50 | Division B | 30 | 16 | 4 | 10 | 71 | 57 | 36 | 3rd | R3 | RU | N/A | — | — | | |
| 1950–51 | Division B | 30 | 12 | 4 | 14 | 58 | 73 | 28 | 10th | R1 | R1 | N/A | — | — | | |
| 1951–52 | Division B | 30 | 15 | 2 | 13 | 74 | 65 | 32 | 6th | R3 | R1 | N/A | — | — | Gerry Mays | 29 |
| 1952–53 | Division B | 30 | 9 | 9 | 12 | 51 | 58 | 27 | 11th | R1 | R1 | N/A | — | — | Jimmy Muir | |
| 1953–54 | Division B | 30 | 11 | 9 | 10 | 48 | 57 | 31 | 8th | R2 | QF | N/A | — | — | George Henderson | 22 |
| 1954–55 | Division B ↑ | 30 | 19 | 4 | 7 | 72 | 40 | 42 | 2nd | R6 | R1 | N/A | — | — | | |
| 1955–56 | Division One | 34 | 10 | 6 | 18 | 42 | 82 | 26 | 16th | R5 | R1 | N/A | — | — | | |
| 1956–57 | Division One ↓ | 34 | 9 | 6 | 19 | 54 | 74 | 24 | 17th | R6 | QF | N/A | — | — | | |
| 1957–58 | Division Two ↑ | 36 | 24 | 5 | 7 | 120 | 42 | 53 | 2nd | R3 | R1 | N/A | — | — | Charlie Dickson | 40 |
| 1958–59 | Division One | 34 | 10 | 8 | 16 | 68 | 87 | 28 | 16th | QF | QF | N/A | — | — | | |
| 1959–60 | Division One | 34 | 10 | 9 | 15 | 72 | 80 | 29 | 13th | R2 | R1 | N/A | — | — | | |
| 1960–61 | Division One | 34 | 12 | 7 | 15 | 65 | 81 | 31 | 12th | W | R1 | N/A | — | — | | |
| 1961–62 | Division One | 34 | 19 | 5 | 10 | 77 | 46 | 43 | 4th | QF | R1 | N/A | UEFA Cup Winners' Cup | QF | | |
| 1962–63 | Division One | 34 | 13 | 8 | 13 | 50 | 47 | 34 | 8th | R3 | R1 | N/A | Inter-Cities Fairs Cup | R2 | | |
| 1963–64 | Division One | 34 | 18 | 9 | 7 | 64 | 33 | 45 | 5th | SF | R1 | N/A | — | — | | |
| 1964–65 | Division One | 34 | 22 | 5 | 7 | 83 | 36 | 49 | 3rd | RU | QF | N/A | Inter-Cities Fairs Cup | R3 | | |
| 1965–66 | Division One | 34 | 19 | 6 | 9 | 94 | 55 | 44 | 4th | SF | R1 | N/A | Inter-Cities Fairs Cup | QF | | |
| 1966–67 | Division One | 34 | 14 | 10 | 10 | 72 | 52 | 38 | 8th | QF | QF | N/A | Inter-Cities Fairs Cup | R2 | | |
| 1967–68 | Division One | 34 | 17 | 5 | 12 | 64 | 41 | 39 | 4th | W | R1 | N/A | — | — | | |
| 1968–69 | Division One | 34 | 19 | 7 | 8 | 63 | 45 | 45 | 3rd | R2 | R1 | N/A | UEFA Cup Winners' Cup | SF | | |
| 1969–70 | Division One | 34 | 15 | 5 | 14 | 45 | 45 | 35 | 9th | R1 | R1 | N/A | Inter-Cities Fairs Cup | R3 | | |
| 1970–71 | Division One | 34 | 6 | 11 | 17 | 44 | 56 | 23 | 16th | R4 | R1 | N/A | — | — | | |
| 1971–72 | Division One ↓ | 34 | 7 | 9 | 18 | 31 | 50 | 23 | 18th | R3 | R1 | N/A | — | — | | |
| 1972–73 | Division Two ↑ | 36 | 23 | 6 | 7 | 95 | 32 | 52 | 2nd | R3 | R1 | N/A | — | — | | |
| 1973–74 | Division One | 34 | 8 | 8 | 18 | 43 | 65 | 24 | 16th | R3 | R2 | N/A | — | — | | |
| 1974–75 | Division One ↓ | 34 | 7 | 9 | 18 | 46 | 66 | 23 | 15th | R3 | R1 | N/A | — | — | | |
| 1975–76 | First Division ↓ | 26 | 5 | 10 | 11 | 30 | 51 | 17 | 13th | R3 | R1 | N/A | — | — | | |
| 1976–77 | Second Division | 39 | 20 | 10 | 9 | 52 | 36 | 50 | 3rd | R3 | R1 | N/A | — | — | | |
| 1977–78 | Second Division | 39 | 18 | 12 | 9 | 64 | 41 | 48 | 3rd | R2 | QF | N/A | — | — | | |
| 1978–79 | Second Division ↑ | 39 | 19 | 14 | 6 | 66 | 40 | 52 | 2nd | R3 | R2 | N/A | — | — | | |
| 1979–80 | First Division | 39 | 11 | 13 | 15 | 39 | 57 | 35 | 10th | R4 | R1 | N/A | — | — | | |
| 1980–81 | First Division | 39 | 10 | 7 | 22 | 41 | 58 | 27 | 12th | R3 | R2 | N/A | — | — | | |
| 1981–82 | First Division | 39 | 11 | 14 | 14 | 46 | 56 | 36 | 10th | R3 | R1 | N/A | — | — | | |
| 1982–83 | First Division ↓ | 39 | 7 | 17 | 15 | 39 | 69 | 31 | 13th | R4 | R1 | N/A | — | — | | |
| 1983–84 | Second Division | 39 | 13 | 10 | 16 | 44 | 45 | 36 | 9th | R3 | R2 | N/A | — | — | | |
| 1984–85 | Second Division | 39 | 17 | 15 | 7 | 61 | 36 | 49 | 3rd | R1 | R2 | N/A | — | — | | |
| 1985–86 | Second Division ↑ | 39 | 23 | 11 | 5 | 91 | 47 | 57 | 1st | R3 | R2 | N/A | — | — | | |
| 1986–87 | First Division ↑ | 44 | 23 | 10 | 11 | 61 | 41 | 56 | 2nd | R3 | R2 | N/A | — | — | | |
| 1987–88 | Premier Division ↓ | 44 | 8 | 10 | 26 | 41 | 84 | 26 | 11th | QF | R3 | N/A | — | — | | |
| 1988–89 | First Division ↑ | 39 | 22 | 10 | 7 | 60 | 36 | 54 | 1st | R3 | QF | N/A | — | — | | |
| 1989–90 | Premier Division | 36 | 11 | 8 | 17 | 37 | 50 | 30 | 8th | QF | SF | N/A | — | — | | |
| 1990–91 | Premier Division | 36 | 8 | 11 | 17 | 38 | 61 | 27 | 8th | R3 | R3 | — | — | — | | |
| 1991–92 | Premier Division ↓ | 44 | 4 | 10 | 30 | 22 | 80 | 18 | 12th | R4 | RU | — | — | — | | |
| 1992–93 | First Division | 44 | 22 | 8 | 14 | 64 | 47 | 52 | 3rd | R3 | R3 | R1 | — | — | | |
| 1993–94 | First Division | 44 | 29 | 7 | 8 | 93 | 35 | 65 | 2nd | R3 | R3 | QF | — | — | | |
| 1994–95 | First Division | 36 | 18 | 14 | 4 | 63 | 32 | 68 | 2nd (Note: Lost 6–2 on aggregate in the promotion/relegation play-off to Aberdeen (Premier Division).) | R4 | R3 | SF | — | — | | |
| 1995–96 | First Division ↑ | 36 | 21 | 8 | 7 | 73 | 41 | 71 | 1st | R4 | R3 | SF | — | — | | |
| 1996–97 | Premier Division | 36 | 12 | 9 | 15 | 52 | 65 | 45 | 5th | R4 | SF | — | — | — | Gerry Britton | 15 |
| 1997–98 | Premier Division | 36 | 8 | 13 | 15 | 43 | 68 | 37 | 8th | R4 | SF | — | — | — | Andy Smith | 22 |
| 1998–99 | Premier League | 36 | 4 | 16 | 16 | 28 | 59 | 28 | 10th | R4 | R2 | N/A (Note: The Scottish Challenge Cup was not played in the 1998–99 season due to lack of sponsorship. As members of the Scottish Premier League, Dunfermline Athletic would not have been eligible to enter if it was played.) | — | — | Andy Smith | 10 |
| 1999–2000 | First Division ↑ | 36 | 20 | 11 | 5 | 66 | 33 | 71 | 2nd | R3 | R3 | R1 | — | — | Stevie Crawford | 16 |
| 2000–01 | Premier League | 38 | 11 | 9 | 18 | 34 | 54 | 42 | 9th | R4 | QF | — | — | — | Stevie Crawford | 9 |
| 2001–02 | Premier League | 38 | 12 | 9 | 17 | 41 | 64 | 45 | 8th | R4 | R3 | — | — | — | Stevie Crawford | 9 |
| 2002–03 | Premier League | 38 | 13 | 7 | 18 | 54 | 71 | 46 | 7th | QF | QF | — | — | — | Stevie Crawford | 22 |
| 2003–04 | Premier League | 38 | 14 | 11 | 13 | 45 | 52 | 53 | 4th | RU | R3 | — | — | — | Stevie Crawford | 17 |
| 2004–05 | Premier League | 38 | 8 | 10 | 20 | 34 | 60 | 34 | 11th | R4 | QF | — | UEFA Cup | QR2 | Andy Tod | 8 |
| 2005–06 | Premier League | 38 | 8 | 9 | 21 | 33 | 68 | 33 | 11th | R3 | RU | — | — | — | Mark Burchill | 15 |
| 2006–07 | Premier League ↓ | 38 | 8 | 8 | 22 | 26 | 55 | 32 | 12th | RU | R3 | — | — | — | Stevie Crawford; Stephen Simmons | 5 |
| 2007–08 | First Division | 36 | 13 | 12 | 11 | 36 | 41 | 51 | 5th | R4 | R3 | RU | UEFA Cup | QR2 | Mark Burchill | 15 |
| 2008–09 | First Division | 36 | 14 | 9 | 13 | 52 | 44 | 51 | 3rd | SF | QF | R2 | — | — | Andy Kirk | 17 |
| 2009–10 | First Division | 36 | 17 | 7 | 12 | 54 | 44 | 58 | 3rd | R5 | R3 | R2 | — | — | Andy Kirk | 15 |
| 2010–11 | First Division ↑ | 36 | 20 | 10 | 6 | 66 | 31 | 70 | 1st | R5 | R3 | R2 | — | — | Andy Kirk | 20 |
| 2011–12 | Premier League ↓ | 38 | 5 | 10 | 23 | 40 | 82 | 25 | 12th | R4 | R2 | — | — | — | Andy Kirk | 12 |
| 2012–13 | First Division ↓ | 36 | 14 | 7 | 15 | 62 | 59 | 34 (Note: Dunfermline Athletic were deducted 15 points for entering administration.) | 9th (Note: Relegated to Scottish League One via the play-offs, beating Forfar Athletic 7–4 on aggregate in the semi-final before losing to Alloa Athletic (League One) 3–1 on aggregate in the final.) | R5 | R3 | R1 | — | — | Andrew Barrowman | 14 |
| 2013–14 | League One | 36 | 19 | 6 | 11 | 68 | 54 | 63 | 2nd (Note: Beat Stranraer 4–2 on aggregate in the semi-final before losing 4–1 on aggregate in the promotion/relegation play-off final to Cowdenbeath (Championship).) | R5 | R2 | R2 | — | — | Ryan Wallace | 13 |
| 2014–15 | League One | 36 | 13 | 9 | 14 | 46 | 48 | 48 | 7th | R4 | R2 | R2 | — | — | Faissal El Bakhtaoui | 9 |
| 2015–16 | League One ↑ | 36 | 24 | 7 | 5 | 83 | 30 | 79 | 1st | R4 | R3 | QF | — | — | Faissal El Bakhtaoui (Note: Scored 22 goals in Scottish League One.) | 30 † |
| 2016–17 | Championship | 36 | 12 | 12 | 12 | 46 | 43 | 48 | 5th | R5 | Group | QF | — | — | Nicky Clark | 16 |
| 2017–18 | Championship | 36 | 16 | 11 | 9 | 60 | 35 | 59 | 4th (Note: Lost 2–1 on aggregate in the promotion/relegation play-off quarter-final to Dundee United (Championship).) | R4 | R2 | R3 | — | — | Nicky Clark | 21 |
| 2018–19 | Championship | 36 | 11 | 8 | 17 | 33 | 40 | 41 | 7th | R4 | R2 | R3 | — | — | Myles Hippolyte; Louis Longridge | 6 |
| 2019–20 | Championship | 28 | 10 | 7 | 11 | 41 | 36 | 37 | 6th (Note: The 2019–20 Scottish Championship was curtailed due to the COVID-19 pandemic, with league positions, promotion and relegation decided on a points-per-game basis.) | R3 | R2 | R3 | — | — | Kevin Nisbet | 23 |
| 2020–21 | Championship | 27 | 10 | 9 | 8 | 38 | 34 | 39 | 4th (Note: Lost 2–0 on aggregate in the promotion/relegation play-off quarter-final to Raith Rovers (Championship).) | R2 | QF | N/A (Note: The Scottish Challenge Cup was not played in the 2020–21 season due to the COVID-19 pandemic.) | — | — | Kevin O'Hara | 11 |
| 2021–22 | Championship ↓ | 36 | 7 | 14 | 15 | 36 | 53 | 35 | 9th (Note: Relegated to Scottish League One via the play-offs, losing to Queen's Park (League One) 1–0 on aggregate in the semi-final.) | R3 | R2 | R3 (Note: Elgin City were awarded a technical 3–0 win over Dunfermline Athletic who were unable to fulfil the fixture as a number of players were self-isolating due to the COVID-19 pandemic.) | — | — | Kevin O'Hara | 9 |
| 2022–23 | League One ↑ | 36 | 23 | 12 | 1 | 63 | 21 | 81 | 1st | R4 | Group | QF | — | — | Craig Wighton | 20 |
| 2023–24 | Championship | 36 | 11 | 12 | 13 | 43 | 48 | 45 | 6th | R3 | Group | R3 | — | — | Lewis McCann | 7 |
| 2024–25 | Championship | 36 | 9 | 8 | 19 | 28 | 43 | 35 | 7th | R5 | Group | SF | — | — | Chris Kane | 12 |
| 2025–26 | Championship | 36 | 14 | 9 | 13 | 52 | 41 | 51 | 4th (Note: Beat Arbroath 1–0 on aggregate in the quarter-final before losing 3–2 on aggregate in the Premiership play-off semi-final to Partick Thistle.) | RU | Group | R2 | — | — | Andrew Tod | 16 |
