= Jim Brown (Cowdenbeath footballer) =

Scottish footballer (died 1955)

Personal information
- Full name: James W Brown
- Place of birth: West Calder, Scotland
- Date of death: 1955
- Place of death: Scotland
- Position: Centre half

Senior career*
Years	Team	Apps	(Gls)
- Linlithgow Rose
–1899	Bo'ness Our Boys		
1899	Celtic	0	(0)
1899–1900	Royal Albert		
1900	Heart of Midlothian	2	(0)
1900	Hamilton Academical	1	(0)
1900–1901	Rangers	0	(0)
1901–1904	St Bernard's	33	(1)
1904–1907	Cowdenbeath	42	(4)
1907–1909	Dunfermline Athletic		
1909–1914	Lochgelly United		
- Kelty Rangers
- * Club domestic league appearances and goals

James W. Brown (died 1955) was a Scottish professional footballer who played in the Scottish League for Cowdenbeath, St Bernard's, Lochgelly United, Heart of Midlothian and Hamilton Academical as a centre half.

== Personal life ==
Brown served in the Royal Scots during the First World War and after his retirement from football, he became the High Chief Ruler of a Fife branch of the Independent Order of Rechabites.

== Career statistics ==
Appearances and goals by club, season and competition
Club	Season	League			Scottish Cup		Total	
Club	Season	Division	Apps	Goals	Apps	Goals	Apps	Goals
Heart of Midlothian	1900–01	Scottish Division One	2	0	0	0	2	0
Hamilton Academical	1900–01	Scottish Division Two	1	0	0	0	1	0
St Bernard's	1901–02	Scottish Division Two	13	1	1	0	14	1
St Bernard's	1902–03	Scottish Division Two	5	0	1	0	6	0
St Bernard's	1903–04	Scottish Division Two	15	0	1	0	16	0
St Bernard's	Total		33	1	3	0	36	1
Cowdenbeath	1904–05	Northern League	0	0	9	0	9	0
Cowdenbeath	1905–06	Scottish Division Two	21	1	1	0	22	1
Cowdenbeath	1906–07	Scottish Division Two	21	3	6	0	27	3
Cowdenbeath	Total		42	4	16	0	58	4
Career total			78	5	19	0	97	5

== Honours ==
- Cowdenbeath Hall of Fame
