= Willie Lancaster =

Scottish footballer

Personal information
- Full name: William Lancaster
- Place of birth: Alloa, Scotland
- Position: Outside right

Senior career*
Years	Team	Apps	(Gls)
1908–1910	Alloa Athletic		
1910–1922	Cowdenbeath	110	(38)
- → Crystal Palace (guest)
1922	Clackmannan	3	(0)
- * Club domestic league appearances and goals

William Lancaster was a Scottish footballer who made 110 appearances as an outside right in the Scottish League for Cowdenbeath. He also played League football for Clackmannan.

== Personal life ==
Prior to becoming a footballer, Lancaster was an apprentice jockey at Epsom Downs Racecourse. He served in the Royal Navy during the First World War.

== Career statistics ==
Appearances and goals by club, season and competition
Club	Season	League			Scottish Cup		Total	
Club	Season	Division	Apps	Goals	Apps	Goals	Apps	Goals
Cowdenbeath	1910–11	Scottish Second Division	22	6	6	0	28	6
Cowdenbeath	1911–12	Scottish Second Division	20	11	11	0	31	11
Cowdenbeath	1912–13	Scottish Second Division	26	6	4	0	30	6
Cowdenbeath	1913–14	Scottish Second Division	16	5	4	0	20	5
Cowdenbeath	1914–15	Scottish Second Division	26	10	2	0	28	10
Cowdenbeath	1919–20	Eastern League	0	0	10	0	10	0
Cowdenbeath	Total		110	38	37	0	147	38
Clackmannan	1921–22	Scottish Second Division	3	0	—		3	0
Career total			113	38	37	0	150	38

== Honours ==
Cowdenbeath

- Scottish League Second Division: 1913–14, 1914–15

Individual

- Cowdenbeath Hall of Fame
