= Willie Curle =

Scottish footballer

Personal information
- Full name: William Curle
- Date of birth: 9 January 1884
- Place of birth: Glasgow, Scotland
- Position: Centre forward

Senior career*
Years	Team	Apps	(Gls)
–1908	Rutherglen Glencairn		
1908–1910	Woolwich Arsenal	3	(0)
1910–1913	Cowdenbeath	41	(23)
1914	Abercorn	7	(0)
1914–1915	Albion Rovers	9	(4)
- Bathgate
- Renton
- * Club domestic league appearances and goals

William Curle was a Scottish professional footballer who played in the Scottish League for Cowdenbeath, Abercorn and Albion Rovers as a centre forward. He also played in the Football League for Woolwich Arsenal.

== Career statistics ==
Appearances and goals by club, season and competition
Club	Season	League			National Cup		Total	
Club	Season	Division	Apps	Goals	Apps	Goals	Apps	Goals
Woolwich Arsenal	1908–09	First Division	3	0	0	0	3	0
Cowdenbeath	1910–11	Scottish Second Division	20	11	5	0	25	11
Cowdenbeath	1911–12	Scottish Second Division	16	11	9	0	25	11
Cowdenbeath	1912–13	Scottish Second Division	5	1	2	0	7	1
Cowdenbeath	Total		41	23	16	0	57	23
Abercorn	1914–15	Scottish Second Division	7	0	—		7	0
Albion Rovers	1914–15	Scottish Second Division	9	4	—		9	4
Career total			57	27	16	0	73	27

== Honours ==
- Cowdenbeath Hall of Fame
