= Curle =

Curle may refer to:

== People ==
- Adam Curle (1916–2006), British academic and Quaker peace activist
- Gerald Curle (1893–1977), English cricketer
- Gilbert Curle (died 1609), secretary of Mary, Queen of Scots
- James Curle (archaeologist) (1862–1944), archaeologist, ceramologist (sigillata), and discoverer of the Newstead Helmet
- J. H. Curle (died 1942), Canadian philatelist
- Keith Curle (born 1963), former English professional footballer
- Richard Curle (1883–1968), Scottish author, traveller and bibliophile
- Tom Curle (born 1986), former English professional footballer
- Walter Curle or Curll (1575–1647), English bishop
- Willie Curle, Scottish footballer

== Places ==
- Curles Neck Plantation (also known as Curles Neck Farm) in the Varina district of Henrico County, Virginia, United States

== Businesses ==
- Seawind Barclay Curle, British shipbuilding company
