= 1907–08 Scottish Division Two =

Scottish Division Two
- Season: 1907–08
- Champions: Raith Rovers
- Promoted: n/a

The 1907–08 Scottish Division Two was won by Raith Rovers, with Cowdenbeath finishing bottom.

== Table ==
Pos	Team	Pld	W	D	L	GF	GA	GD	Pts
1	Raith Rovers (C)	22	14	2	6	37	23	+14	30
2	Ayr	22	11	5	6	40	33	+7	27
2	Dumbarton	22	12	5	5	49	32	+17	27 (Note: Dumbarton were docked two points for fielding an ineligible player.)
4	Abercorn	22	9	5	8	33	30	+3	23
4	East Stirlingshire	22	9	5	8	30	32	−2	23
6	Ayr Parkhouse	22	11	0	11	38	38	0	22
7	Leith Athletic	22	8	5	9	41	40	+1	21
7	St Bernard's	22	8	5	9	31	32	−1	21
9	Albion Rovers	22	7	5	10	36	48	−12	19
10	Vale of Leven	22	5	8	9	25	31	−6	18
11	Arthurlie	22	6	5	11	33	45	−12	17
12	Cowdenbeath	22	5	4	13	26	35	−9	14

Source: statto.com
Rules for classification: Teams finish equal if level on points. Points system: 2 points for a win, 1 point for a draw, 0 points for a loss
(C) Champions
