= 2013–14 Scottish League Two =

Scottish League Two
- Season: 2013–14
- Champions: Peterhead
- Promoted: Peterhead; Stirling Albion
- Matches: 180
- Goals: 343 (1.91 per match)
- Top goalscorer: Rory McAllister (17 goals)
- Biggest home win: Berwick Rangers 4–0 Queen's Park (17 August 2013); Elgin City 4–0 Stirling Albion (28 September 2013); Berwick Rangers 4–0 Stirling Albion (18 January 2014)
- Biggest away win: Queen's Park 0–5 Peterhead (23 November 2013)
- Highest scoring: Annan Athletic 4–4 Stirling Albion (23 November 2013)
- Highest attendance: 859; Stirling Albion 1-1 Clyde (28 December 2013)
- Lowest attendance: 218; East Stirlingshire 1-1 Annan Athletic (7 December 2013)

The 2013–14 Scottish League Two was the 20th season in the current format of 10 teams in the fourth-tier of Scottish football. This was the first season of the competition being part of the newly formed Scottish Professional Football League after the merger of the Scottish Premier League and the Scottish Football League.

== Stadia and locations ==
Location of teams in 2013–14 Scottish League Two

Team	Location	Stadium	Capacity
Albion Rovers	Coatbridge	Cliftonhill	1,238
Annan Athletic	Annan	Galabank	2,514
Berwick Rangers	Berwick-upon-Tweed	Shielfield Park	4,500
Clyde	Cumbernauld	Broadwood Stadium	7,936
East Stirlingshire	Stenhousemuir	Ochilview Park	3,746
Elgin City	Elgin	Borough Briggs	4,520
Montrose	Montrose	Links Park	3,292
Peterhead	Peterhead	Balmoor	3,150
Queen's Park	Glasgow	Hampden Park	52,025
Stirling Albion	Stirling	Forthbank Stadium	3,808

== League table ==
Pos	Team	Pld	W	D	L	GF	GA	GD	Pts	Promotion or qualification
1	Peterhead (C, P)	36	23	7	6	74	38	+36	76	Promotion to League One
2	Annan Athletic	36	19	6	11	69	49	+20	63	Qualification for the League One play-offs
3	Stirling Albion (O, P)	36	16	10	10	60	50	+10	58	Qualification for the League One play-offs
4	Clyde	36	17	6	13	50	48	+2	57	Qualification for the League One play-offs
5	Berwick Rangers	36	15	7	14	63	49	+14	52	
6	Montrose	36	12	10	14	44	56	−12	46	
7	Albion Rovers	36	12	8	16	41	54	−13	44	
8	East Stirlingshire	36	12	8	16	45	59	−14	44	
9	Elgin City	36	9	9	18	62	73	−11	36	
10	Queen's Park	36	5	9	22	36	68	−32	24	

Source: SPFL
Rules for classification: 1) points; 2) goal difference; 3) number of goals scored.
(C) Champions; (O) Play-off winners; (P) Promoted

== Results ==
=== First half of season ===
Home \ Away	ALB	ANN	BER	CLY	EST	ELG	MON	PET	QPA	STI
Albion Rovers		2–0	0–2	3–0	3–2	0–0	0–2	1–2	2–1	2–1
Annan Athletic	1–1		3–2	1–2	1–2	2–1	2–1	2–0		4–4
Berwick Rangers	2–1	4–2		0–1	2–0	2–3	1–1	1–3	4–0	1–1
Clyde	2–2	2–1	1–0		1–2	2–1	0–3	1–3	3–0	2–1
East Stirlingshire	1–4	1–1	1–0	0–1		3–0	2–2	1–4	1–1	2–2
Elgin City	1–2	2–3	2–0	1–0	0–1		3–3	2–4	3–2	4–0
Montrose	2–1	0–2	1–1	0–2	2–0	3–3		2–1	1–2	1–2
Peterhead	1–1	2–2	1–1	1–1	1–1	2–2	3–0		2–1	3–1
Queen's Park	1–1	2–5	0–4	1–1	1–3	3–3	0–1	0–5		0–2
Stirling Albion	2–1	0–2	3–1	1–1	1–3		3–1	2–0	3–0	

Updated to match(es) played on 28 December 2013. Source:
Legend: Blue = home team win; Yellow = draw; Red = away team win.
