= 1908–09 Scottish Division Two =

Scottish Division Two
- Season: 1908–09
- Champions: Abercorn
- Promoted: n/a

The 1908–09 Scottish Division Two was won by Abercorn, with Arthurlie finishing bottom.

== Table ==
Pos	Team	Pld	W	D	L	GF	GA	GD	Pts
1	Abercorn (C)	22	13	5	4	39	17	+22	31
2	Raith Rovers	22	11	6	5	46	22	+24	28
2	Vale of Leven	22	12	4	6	38	25	+13	28
4	Dumbarton	22	10	5	7	34	34	0	25
5	Ayr	22	10	3	9	43	36	+7	23
5	Leith Athletic	22	10	3	9	37	33	+4	23
7	Ayr Parkhouse	22	8	5	9	29	31	−2	21
7	East Stirlingshire	22	9	3	10	27	33	−6	21
7	St Bernard's	22	9	3	10	34	37	−3	21
10	Albion Rovers	22	9	2	11	37	47	−10	20
11	Cowdenbeath	22	4	4	14	19	42	−23	12
12	Arthurlie	22	5	1	16	29	55	−26	11

Source: statto.com
Rules for classification: Teams finish equal if level on points. Points system: 2 points for a win, 1 point for a draw, 0 points for a loss
(C) Champions
