= 1904–05 Scottish Division Two =

Scottish Division Two
- Season: 1904–05
- Champions: Clyde
- Promoted: Falkirk and Aberdeen

The 1904–05 Scottish Division Two was won by Clyde with St Bernard's finishing bottom.

== Table ==
Pos	Team	Pld	W	D	L	GF	GA	GD	Pts	Promotion or relegation
1	Clyde (C)	22	13	6	3	38	22	+16	32	
2	Falkirk (P)	22	12	4	6	32	25	+7	28	Promoted to the 1905–06 Scottish Division One
3	Hamilton Academical	22	12	3	7	40	24	+16	27	
4	Leith Athletic	22	10	4	8	36	26	+10	24	
5	Arthurlie	22	9	5	8	37	41	−4	23	
5	Ayr	22	11	1	10	46	37	+9	23	
7	Aberdeen (P)	22	7	7	8	36	26	+10	21	Promoted to the 1905–06 Scottish Division One
8	Albion Rovers	22	8	4	10	38	53	−15	20	
9	East Stirlingshire	22	7	5	10	37	38	−1	19	
9	Raith Rovers	22	9	1	12	30	34	−4	19	
11	Abercorn	22	8	1	13	31	45	−14	17	
12	St Bernard's	22	3	5	14	23	53	−30	11	

Source: statto.com
Rules for classification: Teams finish equal if level on points. Points system: 2 points for a win, 1 point for a draw, 0 points for a loss
(C) Champions; (P) Promoted
