= 1903–04 Scottish Division Two =

Scottish Division Two
- Season: 1903–04
- Champions: Hamilton Academical
- Promoted: n/a

The 1903–04 Scottish Division Two was won by Hamilton Academical, with Ayr Parkhouse finishing bottom.

== Table ==
Pos	Team	Pld	W	D	L	GF	GA	GD	Pts	Qualification
1	Hamilton Academical (C)	22	16	5	1	56	19	+37	37	
2	Clyde	22	12	5	5	51	36	+15	29	
3	Ayr	22	11	6	5	34	31	+3	28	
4	Falkirk	22	11	4	7	50	36	+14	26	
5	East Stirlingshire	22	8	5	9	35	40	−5	21	
5	Raith Rovers	22	8	5	9	40	38	+2	21	
7	Leith Athletic	22	8	4	10	42	40	+2	20	
7	St Bernard's	22	9	2	11	31	43	−12	20	
9	Albion Rovers	22	8	5	9	47	37	+10	19 (Note: Albion Rovers were docked two points.)	
10	Abercorn	22	6	4	12	40	55	−15	16	
11	Arthurlie	22	5	5	12	37	50	−13	15	
12	Ayr Parkhouse (R)	22	3	4	15	24	62	−38	10	Did not apply for re-election (Note: Ayr Parkhouse did not apply for re-election to compete for the next season and were replaced by Aberdeen.)

Source: statto.com
Rules for classification: Teams finish equal if level on points. Points system: 2 points for a win, 1 point for a draw, 0 points for a loss
(C) Champions; (R) Relegated
