= 1952–53 Scottish Division B =

Scottish Division B
- Season: 1952–53
- Champions: Stirling Albion
- Promoted: Stirling Albion; Hamilton Academical

The 1952–53 Scottish Division B was won by Stirling Albion who, along with second placed Hamilton Academical, were promoted to the Division A. Albion Rovers finished bottom.

== Table ==
Pos	Team	Pld	W	D	L	GF	GA	GD	Pts	Promotion or relegation
1	Stirling Albion	30	20	4	6	64	43	+21	44	Promotion to the 1953–54 Division A
2	Hamilton Academical	30	20	3	7	72	40	+32	43	Promotion to the 1953–54 Division A
3	Queen's Park	30	15	7	8	70	46	+24	37	
4	Kilmarnock	30	17	2	11	74	48	+26	36	
5	Ayr United	30	17	2	11	76	56	+20	36	
6	Morton	30	15	3	12	79	57	+22	33	
7	Arbroath	30	13	7	10	52	57	−5	33	
8	Dundee United	30	12	5	13	52	56	−4	29	
9	Alloa Athletic	30	12	5	13	63	68	−5	29	
10	Dumbarton	30	11	6	13	58	67	−9	28	
11	Dunfermline Athletic	30	9	9	12	51	58	−7	27	
12	Stenhousemuir	30	10	6	14	56	65	−9	26	
13	Cowdenbeath	30	8	7	15	37	54	−17	23	
14	St Johnstone	30	8	6	16	41	63	−22	22	
15	Forfar Athletic	30	8	4	18	54	88	−34	20	
16	Albion Rovers	30	5	4	21	44	77	−33	14	

Source: "1952-1953 Division B - SPFL Archive". SPFL.
