= 1902–03 Scottish Division Two =

Scottish Division Two
- Season: 1902–03
- Champions: Airdrieonians
- Promoted: Airdrieonians and Motherwell

The 1902–03 Scottish Division Two was won by Airdrieonians. Both Airdrieonians and Motherwell were promoted to Division One.

== Table ==
| Pos | Team | Pld | W | D | L | GF | GA | GD | Pts | Promotion or relegation |
|---|---|---|---|---|---|---|---|---|---|---|
| 1 | Airdrieonians (C, P) | 22 | 15 | 5 | 2 | 43 | 19 | +24 | 35 | Promoted to the 1903–04 Scottish Division One |
| 2 | Motherwell (P) | 22 | 12 | 4 | 6 | 44 | 35 | +9 | 28 | Promoted to the 1903–04 Scottish Division One |
| 3 | Ayr | 22 | 12 | 3 | 7 | 34 | 34 | 0 | 27 | |
| 3 | Leith Athletic | 22 | 11 | 5 | 6 | 43 | 42 | +1 | 27 | |
| 5 | St Bernard's | 22 | 12 | 2 | 8 | 45 | 32 | +13 | 26 | |
| 6 | Falkirk | 22 | 8 | 7 | 7 | 39 | 37 | +2 | 23 | |
| 6 | Hamilton Academical | 22 | 11 | 1 | 10 | 45 | 35 | +10 | 23 | |
| 8 | East Stirlingshire | 22 | 9 | 3 | 10 | 46 | 41 | +5 | 21 | |
| 9 | Arthurlie | 22 | 6 | 8 | 8 | 34 | 46 | −12 | 20 | |
| 10 | Abercorn | 22 | 5 | 2 | 15 | 35 | 58 | −23 | 12 | |
| 11 | Clyde | 22 | 2 | 7 | 13 | 22 | 40 | −18 | 11 | |
| 11 | Raith Rovers | 22 | 3 | 5 | 14 | 34 | 55 | −21 | 11 | |

Source: statto.com
Rules for classification: Teams finish equal if level on points. Points system: 2 points for a win, 1 point for a draw, 0 points for a loss
(C) Champions; (P) Promoted
