= 1906–07 Scottish Division Two =

Scottish Division Two
- Season: 1906–07
- Champions: St Bernard's
- Promoted: n/a

The 1906–07 Scottish Division Two was won by St Bernard's, with Ayr Parkhouse finishing bottom.

== Table ==
Pos	Team	Pld	W	D	L	GF	GA	GD	Pts
1	St Bernard's (C)	22	14	4	4	41	24	+17	32
2	Arthurlie	22	12	3	7	51	40	+11	27
2	Vale of Leven	22	13	1	8	54	35	+19	27
4	Dumbarton	22	11	3	8	52	35	+17	25
5	Leith Athletic	22	10	4	8	40	35	+5	24
6	Albion Rovers	22	10	3	9	43	36	+7	23
6	Cowdenbeath	22	10	5	7	36	40	−4	23 (Note: Cowdenbeath were docked two points for fielding an ineligible player.)
8	Ayr	22	7	6	9	34	38	−4	20
9	Abercorn	22	5	7	10	29	47	−18	17
10	Raith Rovers	22	6	4	12	40	48	−8	16 (Note: Raith Rovers and East Stirlingshire finished level on points but Raith Rovers won a play-off match to determine ranking positions.)
11	East Stirlingshire	22	6	4	12	36	48	−12	16
12	Ayr Parkhouse	22	5	2	15	33	63	−30	12

Source: statto.com
Rules for classification: Teams finish equal if level on points. Points system: 2 points for a win, 1 point for a draw, 0 points for a loss
(C) Champions
