= 1910–11 Scottish Division Two =

Scottish Division Two
- Season: 1910–11
- Champions: Dumbarton
- Promoted: n/a

The 1910–11 Scottish Division Two was won by Dumbarton, with Vale of Leven finishing bottom.

This season Ayr and Ayr Parkhouse merged to form Ayr United. The vacant place in Division Two was filled by Dundee Hibernian.

== Table ==
Pos	Team	Pld	W	D	L	GF	GA	GD	Pts	Qualification
1	Dumbarton (C)	22	15	1	6	52	30	+22	31	
2	Ayr United	22	12	3	7	54	36	+18	27	
3	Albion Rovers	22	10	5	7	26	21	+5	25	
4	Leith Athletic	22	9	6	7	42	43	−1	24	
5	Cowdenbeath	22	9	5	8	31	27	+4	23	
6	St Bernard's	22	10	2	10	36	41	−5	22	
7	East Stirlingshire	22	7	6	9	28	34	−6	20	
8	Abercorn	22	9	1	12	39	50	−11	19	
8	Arthurlie	22	7	5	10	26	33	−7	19	
8	Dundee Hibernian	22	7	5	10	29	36	−7	19	
8	Port Glasgow Athletic (R)	22	8	3	11	27	32	−5	19	Did not apply for re-election (Note: Port Glasgow Athletic did not apply for re-election to compete for the next season and were replaced by St Johnstone.)
12	Vale of Leven	22	4	8	10	21	28	−7	16	

Source: statto.com
Rules for classification: Teams finish equal if level on points. Points system: 2 points for a win, 1 point for a draw, 0 points for a loss
(C) Champions; (R) Relegated
