= 1914–15 Scottish Division Two =

Scottish Division Two
- Season: 1914–15
- Champions: Cowdenbeath
- Promoted: n/a

The 1914–15 Scottish Division Two was the last season of play in the Scottish Division Two before World War I. It would not commence again until the 1921–22 season.

It was won by Cowdenbeath after a round robin tournament to decide the title with three clubs tied. Vale of Leven finished bottom.

== Table ==
| Pos | Team | Pld | W | D | L | GF | GA | GD | Pts | Qualification |
|---|---|---|---|---|---|---|---|---|---|---|
| 1 | Cowdenbeath (C) | 26 | 16 | 5 | 5 | 49 | 17 | +32 | 37 (Note: Cowdenbeath, Leith Athletic and St Bernard's finished level on points. A round-robin tournament to determine the champion was won by Cowdenbeath.) | |
| 2 | Leith Athletic | 26 | 15 | 7 | 4 | 54 | 31 | +23 | 37 | Left the League |
| 3 | St Bernard's | 26 | 18 | 1 | 7 | 66 | 34 | +32 | 37 | |
| 4 | East Stirlingshire | 26 | 13 | 5 | 8 | 53 | 44 | +9 | 31 | |
| 5 | Clydebank | 26 | 13 | 4 | 9 | 67 | 37 | +30 | 30 | Joined the 1917–18 Scottish Football League |
| 6 | Dunfermline Athletic | 26 | 13 | 2 | 11 | 49 | 39 | +10 | 28 | |
| 7 | Johnstone | 26 | 11 | 5 | 10 | 41 | 52 | −11 | 27 | |
| 8 | St Johnstone | 26 | 10 | 6 | 10 | 56 | 53 | +3 | 26 | |
| 9 | Albion Rovers | 26 | 9 | 7 | 10 | 37 | 42 | −5 | 25 | Joined the 1919–20 Scottish Football League |
| 10 | Lochgelly United | 26 | 9 | 3 | 14 | 43 | 60 | −17 | 21 | |
| 11 | Dundee Hibernian | 26 | 8 | 3 | 15 | 48 | 61 | −13 | 19 | |
| 12 | Abercorn | 26 | 5 | 7 | 14 | 35 | 65 | −30 | 17 | Left the League |
| 13 | Arthurlie | 26 | 6 | 4 | 16 | 36 | 66 | −30 | 16 | Left the League |
| 14 | Vale of Leven | 26 | 4 | 5 | 17 | 33 | 66 | −33 | 13 | |

Source: statto.com
Rules for classification: Teams finish equal if level on points. Points system: 2 points for a win, 1 point for a draw, 0 points for a loss
(C) Champions

== Championship play-off ==
10 April 1915

| Cowdenbeath | 2–1 | Leith Athletic |

East End Park, Dunfermline
17 April 1915

| Leith Athletic | 2–1 | St Bernard's |

Easter Road, Edinburgh
24 April 1915

| Cowdenbeath | 3–1 | St Bernard's |

Easter Road, Edinburgh
