= 1901–02 Scottish Division Two =

Scottish Division Two
- Season: 1901–1902
- Promoted: Port Glasgow Athletic and Partick Thistle

The 1901–02 Scottish Division Two was won by Port Glasgow Athletic.

== Table ==
| Pos | Team | Pld | W | D | L | GF | GA | GD | Pts | Promotion or relegation |
|---|---|---|---|---|---|---|---|---|---|---|
| 1 | Port Glasgow Athletic (C, P) | 22 | 14 | 4 | 4 | 75 | 31 | +44 | 32 | Promoted to the 1902–03 Scottish Division One |
| 2 | Partick Thistle (P) | 22 | 13 | 4 | 5 | 50 | 29 | +21 | 30 | Promoted to the 1902–03 Scottish Division One |
| 3 | Motherwell | 22 | 12 | 2 | 8 | 50 | 44 | +6 | 26 | |
| 4 | Airdrieonians | 22 | 10 | 5 | 7 | 41 | 32 | +9 | 25 | |
| 4 | Hamilton Academical | 22 | 11 | 3 | 8 | 45 | 40 | +5 | 25 | |
| 6 | St Bernard's | 22 | 10 | 2 | 10 | 30 | 31 | −1 | 22 | |
| 7 | Ayr | 22 | 8 | 5 | 9 | 27 | 33 | −6 | 21 | |
| 7 | Leith Athletic | 22 | 9 | 3 | 10 | 34 | 38 | −4 | 21 | |
| 9 | East Stirlingshire | 22 | 8 | 3 | 11 | 38 | 46 | −8 | 19 | |
| 10 | Arthurlie | 22 | 6 | 5 | 11 | 32 | 42 | −10 | 17 | |
| 11 | Abercorn | 22 | 4 | 5 | 13 | 27 | 59 | −32 | 13 | |
| 11 | Clyde | 22 | 5 | 3 | 14 | 21 | 45 | −24 | 13 | |

Source: statto.com
Rules for classification: Teams finish equal if level on points. Points system: 2 points for a win, 1 point for a draw, 0 points for a loss
(C) Champions; (P) Promoted
