= 1911–12 Scottish Division Two =

Scottish Division Two
- Season: 1911–12
- Champions: Ayr United
- Promoted: n/a

The 1911–12 Scottish Division Two was won by Ayr United, with Albion Rovers and Vale of Leven finishing bottom.

== Table ==
Pos	Team	Pld	W	D	L	GF	GA	GD	Pts
1	Ayr United (C)	22	16	3	3	54	24	+30	35
2	Abercorn	22	13	4	5	43	22	+21	30
3	Dumbarton	22	13	1	8	47	31	+16	27
4	Cowdenbeath	22	12	2	8	39	31	+8	26
5	St Johnstone	22	10	4	8	29	27	+2	24
6	St Bernard's	22	9	5	8	38	36	+2	23
7	Leith Athletic	22	9	4	9	31	34	−3	22
8	Arthurlie	22	7	5	10	30	30	0	19
9	East Stirlingshire	22	7	3	12	21	31	−10	17
10	Dundee Hibernian	22	5	5	12	21	41	−20	15
11	Albion Rovers	22	6	1	15	19	41	−22	13
11	Vale of Leven	22	6	1	15	26	50	−24	13

Source: statto.com
Rules for classification: Teams finish equal if level on points. Points system: 2 points for a win, 1 point for a draw, 0 points for a loss
(C) Champions
