= 1956–57 Scottish Division Two =

Scottish Second Division
- Season: 1956–57
- Champions: Clyde
- Promoted: Clyde; Third Lanark

The 1956–57 Scottish Second Division was won by Clyde who, along with second placed Third Lanark, were promoted to the First Division. East Stirlingshire finished bottom.

== Table ==
Pos	Team	Pld	W	D	L	GF	GA	GD	Pts	Promotion or relegation
1	Clyde	36	29	6	1	122	39	+83	64	Promotion to the 1957–58 First Division
2	Third Lanark	36	24	3	9	105	51	+54	51	Promotion to the 1957–58 First Division
3	Cowdenbeath	36	20	5	11	87	65	+22	45	
4	Morton	36	18	7	11	81	70	+11	43	
5	Albion Rovers	36	18	6	12	98	80	+18	42	
6	Brechin City	36	15	10	11	72	68	+4	40	
7	Stranraer	36	15	10	11	79	77	+2	40	
8	Stirling Albion	36	17	5	14	81	64	+17	39	
9	Dumbarton	36	17	4	15	101	70	+31	38	
10	Arbroath	36	17	4	15	79	57	+22	38	
11	Hamilton Academical	36	14	8	14	69	68	+1	36	
12	St Johnstone	36	14	6	16	79	80	−1	34	
13	Dundee United	36	14	6	16	75	80	−5	34	
14	Stenhousemuir	36	13	6	17	71	81	−10	32	
15	Alloa Athletic	36	11	5	20	66	99	−33	27	
16	Forfar Athletic	36	9	5	22	75	100	−25	23	
17	Montrose	36	7	7	22	54	124	−70	21	
18	Berwick Rangers	36	7	6	23	58	114	−56	20	
19	East Stirlingshire	36	5	7	24	56	121	−65	17	

Source: "1956-1957 Second Division - SPFL Archive". SPFL.
