= 1974–75 Scottish Cup =

Tournament details
- Country: Scotland

Final positions
- Champions: Celtic
- Runners-up: Airdrieonians

The 1974–75 Scottish Cup was the 90th season of Scotland's most prestigious football knockout competition. The Cup was won by Celtic, who defeated Airdrieonians in the final.

== First round ==
Home team	Score	Away team
Clachnacuddin	8 – 1	Gala Fairydean
Montrose	5 – 1	Selkirk
Ross County	2 – 0	Brechin City
St Cuthbert Wanderers	1 – 4	Albion Rovers
Stenhousemuir	2 – 2	East Stirlingshire

=== Replays ===
Home team	Score	Away team
East Stirlingshire	3 – 1	Stenhousemuir

== Second round ==
Home team	Score	Away team
Alloa Athletic	1 – 1	Albion Rovers
Clachnacuddin	4 – 3	Stirling Albion
Cowdenbeath	0 – 2	Clydebank
East Stirlingshire	2 – 1	St Mirren
Forfar Athletic	2 – 3	Ross County
Inverness Caledonian	2 – 0	Inverness Thistle
Stranraer	2 – 4	Queen's Park
Vale of Leithen	0 – 12	Montrose

=== Replay ===
Home team	Score	Away team
Albion Rovers	2 – 0	Alloa Athletic

== Third round ==
Home team	Score	Away team
Dundee United	1 – 1	Berwick Rangers
Ross County	1 – 5	Falkirk
Dumbarton	2 – 1	Clachnacuddin
Heart of Midlothian	2 – 0	Kilmarnock
St Johnstone	1 – 0	East Fife
Airdrieonians	0 – 0	Morton
Clydebank	2 – 1	Dunfermline Athletic
Montrose	0 – 0	Hamilton Academical
Aberdeen	1 – 1	Rangers
Arbroath	1 – 0	East Stirlingshire
Ayr United	1 – 2	Queen's Park
Clyde	0 – 1	Dundee
Hibernian	0 – 2	Celtic
Inverness Caledonian	0 – 1	Albion Rovers
Motherwell	0 – 0	Partick Thistle
Queen of the South	2 – 0	Raith Rovers

=== Replays ===
Home team	Score	Away team
Rangers	1 – 2	Aberdeen
Hamilton Academical	3 – 0	Montrose
Morton	0 – 3	Airdrieonians
Partick Thistle	0 – 1	Motherwell
Berwick Rangers	0 – 1	Dundee United

== Fourth round ==
Home team	Score	Away team
Dundee United	0 – 1	Aberdeen
Airdrieonians	2 – 0	Falkirk
Arbroath	2 – 0	Albion Rovers
Celtic	4 – 1	Clydebank
Hamilton Academical	0 – 1	Dumbarton
Motherwell	4 – 0	Queen's Park
Queen of the South	0 – 2	Heart of Midlothian
St Johnstone	0 – 1	Dundee

== Quarter-finals ==
Home team	Score	Away team
Aberdeen	0 – 1	Motherwell
Arbroath	2 – 2	Airdrieonians
Dumbarton	1 – 2	Celtic
Heart of Midlothian	1 – 1	Dundee

=== Replays ===
Home team	Score	Away team
Airdrieonians	3 – 0	Arbroath
Dundee	3 – 2	Heart of Midlothian

== Semi-finals ==
2 April 1975

Celtic	1 – 0	Dundee
Glavin

Attendance: 40,702
Referee: Hugh Alexander

5 April 1975

Airdrieonians	1 – 1	Motherwell
MacLaren (o.g.)		Pettigrew

Attendance: 20,574
Referee: Rollo Kyle

=== Replay ===
9 April 1975

Airdrieonians	1 – 0	Motherwell
John Lapsley

Attendance: 13,173

== Final ==
3 May 1975

Celtic	3 – 1	Airdrieonians
Paul Wilson; Pat McCluskey	Report (Page 18)	Kevin McCann

Hampden Park, Glasgow
Attendance: 75,457
Referee: Ian Foote

== See also ==
- 1974–75 in Scottish football
- 1974–75 Scottish League Cup
