= 1992–93 Scottish League Cup =

Tournament details
- Country: Scotland

Final positions
- Champions: Rangers
- Runners-up: Aberdeen

Tournament statistics
- Top goal scorer: Ally McCoist (8)

The 1992–93 Scottish League Cup was the 47th staging of the Scotland's second most prestigious football knockout competition.

The competition was won by Rangers, who defeated Aberdeen 2–1 in the Final at Hampden Park.

== First round ==
Home team	Score	Away team
East Stirlingshire	0–1	Alloa Athletic
Stenhousemuir	2–3	Arbroath
Stranraer	(p)0 – 0	East Fife
Brechin City	2–1	Albion Rovers
Queen of the South	3–0	Berwick Rangers
Queen's Park	1–3	Clyde

== Second round ==
Home team	Score	Away team
Airdrieonians	2–3	Stranraer
Alloa Athletic	1–3	St Johnstone
Brechin City	4–2	Hamilton Accies
Dumbarton	0–5	Rangers
Dundee United	6–0	Queen of the South
Meadowbank Thistle	0–3	Dundee
Morton	2–3	Kilmarnock
Motherwell	4–2	Clyde
Partick Thistle	2–0	Ayr United
Arbroath	0–4	Aberdeen
Falkirk	4–1	Forfar Athletic
Heart of Midlothian	1–0	Clydebank
Hibernian	4–1	Raith Rovers
Montrose	0–6	Dunfermline Athletic
St Mirren	1–0	Cowdenbeath
Stirling Albion	0–3	Celtic

== Third round ==
Home team	Score	Away team
Dundee United	3–0	St Mirren
Kilmarnock	3–1	Hibernian
Aberdeen	1–0	Dunfermline Athletic
Brechin City	1–2	Heart of Midlothian
Celtic	1–0	Dundee
Motherwell	0–1	Falkirk
St Johnstone	(p)2 – 2	Partick Thistle
Stranraer	0–5	Rangers

== Quarter-finals ==
25 August 1992

Kilmarnock	1–3	St Johnstone

Rugby Park, Kilmarnock

26 August 1992

Dundee United	2–3	Rangers

Tannadice Park, Dundee

26 August 1992

Falkirk	1–4	Aberdeen

Brockville Park, Falkirk

26 August 1992

Heart of Midlothian	1–2	Celtic

Tynecastle Stadium, Edinburgh

== Semi-finals ==
22 September 1992

Rangers	3–1	St Johnstone

Hampden Park, Glasgow

23 September 1992

Aberdeen	1–0	Celtic

Hampden Park, Glasgow

== Final ==
25 October 1992

Rangers	2–1 (a.e.t.)	Aberdeen
McCall 14'; Smith 114' (og)		Shearer 62'

Hampden Park, Glasgow
Attendance: 45,298
Referee: Dougie Hope
