= 1912–13 Scottish Division Two =

Scottish Division Two
- Season: 1912–13
- Champions: Ayr United
- Promoted: Ayr United and Dumbarton

The 1912–13 Scottish Division Two was won by Ayr United, with Leith Athletic finishing bottom.

== Table ==
Pos	Team	Pld	W	D	L	GF	GA	GD	Pts	Promotion or relegation
1	Ayr United (C, P)	26	13	8	5	45	19	+26	34	Promoted to the 1913–14 Scottish Division One
2	Dunfermline Athletic	26	13	7	6	45	27	+18	33	
3	East Stirlingshire	26	12	8	6	43	27	+16	32	
4	Abercorn	26	12	7	7	33	31	+2	31	
5	Cowdenbeath	26	12	6	8	36	27	+9	30	
6	Dumbarton (P)	26	12	5	9	38	30	+8	29	Promoted to the 1913–14 Scottish Division One
7	St Bernard's	26	12	3	11	36	34	+2	27	
8	Johnstone	26	9	6	11	31	43	−12	24	
9	Albion Rovers	26	10	3	13	38	40	−2	23	
10	Dundee Hibernian	26	6	10	10	34	43	−9	22	
11	St Johnstone	26	7	7	12	29	38	−9	21	
11	Vale of Leven	26	8	5	13	28	44	−16	21	
13	Arthurlie	26	7	5	14	37	49	−12	19	
14	Leith Athletic	26	5	8	13	26	47	−21	18	

Source: statto.com
Rules for classification: Teams finish equal if level on points. Points system: 2 points for a win, 1 point for a draw, 0 points for a loss
(C) Champions; (P) Promoted
