= 1900–01 Scottish Division Two =

Scottish Division Two
- Season: 1900–01
- Champions: St Bernard's

The 1900–01 Scottish Division Two was won by St Bernard's with Motherwell finishing bottom.

== Table ==
Pos	Team	Pld	W	D	L	GF	GA	GD	Pts
1	St Bernard's (C)	18	11	4	3	42	26	+16	26
2	Airdrieonians	18	11	1	6	43	32	+11	23
3	Abercorn	18	9	3	6	37	33	+4	21
4	Clyde	18	9	2	7	43	35	+8	20
4	Port Glasgow Athletic	18	10	0	8	45	43	+2	20
6	Ayr	18	9	0	9	32	34	−2	18
7	East Stirlingshire	18	7	3	8	34	39	−5	17
8	Hamilton Academical	18	4	4	10	41	49	−8	12
8	Leith Athletic	18	5	2	11	22	32	−10	12
10	Motherwell	18	4	3	11	26	42	−16	11

Source: statto.com
Rules for classification: Teams finish equal if level on points. Points system: 2 points for a win, 1 point for a draw, 0 points for a loss
(C) Champions
