= 1951–52 Scottish Division B =

Scottish football league season

Scottish Division B
- Season: 1951–52
- Champions: Clyde
- Promoted: Clyde; Falkirk

The 1951–52 Scottish Division B was won by Clyde who, along with second placed Falkirk, were promoted to Division A. Arbroath finished bottom.

== Table ==
Pos	Team	Pld	W	D	L	GF	GA	GD	Pts	Promotion or relegation
1	Clyde	30	19	6	5	100	45	+55	44	Promotion to the 1952–53 Division A
2	Falkirk	30	18	7	5	80	34	+46	43	Promotion to the 1952–53 Division A
3	Ayr United	30	17	5	8	55	45	+10	39	
4	Dundee United	30	16	5	9	75	60	+15	37	
5	Kilmarnock	30	16	2	12	62	48	+14	34	
6	Dunfermline Athletic	30	15	2	13	74	65	+9	32	
7	Alloa Athletic	30	13	6	11	55	49	+6	32	
8	Cowdenbeath	30	12	8	10	66	67	−1	32	
9	Hamilton Academical	30	12	6	12	47	51	−4	30	
10	Dumbarton	30	10	8	12	51	57	−6	28	
11	St Johnstone	30	9	7	14	62	68	−6	25	
12	Forfar Athletic	30	10	4	16	59	97	−38	24	
13	Stenhousemuir	30	8	6	16	57	74	−17	22	
14	Albion Rovers	30	6	10	14	39	57	−18	22	
15	Queen's Park	30	8	4	18	40	62	−22	20	
16	Arbroath	30	6	4	20	40	83	−43	16	

Source: "1951-1952 Division B - SPFL Archive". SPFL.
