= 1905–06 Scottish Division Two =

Scottish Division Two
- Season: 1905–06
- Champions: Leith Athletic
- Promoted: Clyde and Hamilton Academical

The 1905–06 Scottish Division Two was won by Leith Athletic with East Stirlingshire finishing bottom.

Due to expansion next season there are eighteen teams in Division One and twelve teams in Division Two. This meant Clyde and Hamilton Academical were promoted to the Scottish First Division.

== Table ==
Pos	Team	Pld	W	D	L	GF	GA	GD	Pts	Promotion or relegation
1	Leith Athletic (C)	22	15	4	3	46	22	+24	34	
2	Clyde (P)	22	11	9	2	37	21	+16	31	Promoted to the 1906–07 Scottish Division One
3	Albion Rovers	22	12	3	7	48	31	+17	27	
4	Hamilton Academical (P)	22	12	2	8	45	33	+12	26	Promoted to the 1906–07 Scottish Division One
5	Arthurlie	22	10	2	10	46	46	0	22	
5	St Bernard's	22	9	4	9	42	34	+8	22	
7	Ayr	22	9	3	10	44	51	−7	21	
8	Raith Rovers	22	6	7	9	36	42	−6	19	
9	Abercorn	22	6	5	11	31	46	−15	17	
9	Cowdenbeath	22	7	3	12	28	40	−12	17	
11	Vale of Leven	22	6	4	12	33	49	−16	16	
12	East Stirlingshire	22	1	10	11	26	47	−21	12	

Source: statto.com
Rules for classification: Teams finish equal if level on points. Points system: 2 points for a win, 1 point for a draw, 0 points for a loss
(C) Champions; (P) Promoted
