= 1921–22 Scottish Division Two =

Scottish Division Two
- Season: 1921–22
- Champions: Alloa Athletic
- Promoted: Alloa Athletic

The 1921–22 Scottish Division Two was the first season of play in the Scottish Division Two after World War I. It was also the first season of automatic promotion and relegation in the Scottish Football League.

The division was won by Alloa Athletic, who were promoted to Division One. Clackmannan finished bottom of the division.

== Table ==
Pos	Team	Pld	W	D	L	GF	GA	GR	Pts	Promotion or relegation
1	Alloa Athletic (C, P)	38	26	8	4	81	32	2.531	60	Promoted to the 1922–23 Scottish Division One
2	Cowdenbeath	38	19	9	10	57	30	1.900	47	
3	Armadale	38	20	5	13	64	48	1.333	45	
4	Vale of Leven	38	17	10	11	54	43	1.256	44	
5	Bathgate	38	16	11	11	56	41	1.366	43	
6	Bo'ness	38	16	7	15	56	49	1.143	39	
7	Broxburn United	38	14	11	13	43	43	1.000	39	
8	Dunfermline Athletic	38	14	10	14	56	42	1.333	38	
9	St Bernard's	38	15	8	15	50	49	1.020	38	
10	East Fife	38	15	8	15	54	54	1.000	38	
11	Stenhousemuir	38	14	10	14	50	51	0.980	38	
12	Johnstone	38	14	10	14	46	59	0.780	38	
13	St Johnstone	38	12	11	15	41	52	0.788	35	
14	Forfar Athletic	38	11	12	15	43	51	0.843	34	
15	East Stirlingshire	38	12	10	16	43	60	0.717	34	
16	Arbroath	38	11	11	16	45	56	0.804	33	
17	King's Park	38	10	12	16	47	65	0.723	32	
18	Lochgelly United	38	11	9	18	46	54	0.852	31	
19	Dundee Hibernian	38	10	8	20	47	65	0.723	28	Left the League
20	Clackmannan	38	9	8	21	40	75	0.533	26	Left the League

Source: statto.com
Rules for classification: Teams are ranked by points then goal average. Points system: 2 points for a win, 1 point for a draw, 0 points for a loss
(C) Champions; (P) Promoted
