= Arthurlie F.C. =

Scottish football club

Arthurlie FC
- Full name: Arthurlie Football Club
- Nickname: The 'Lie
- Founded: 1874
- Ground: Dunterlie Park, Barrhead
- Capacity: 3,000
- Coordinates: 55°48′12″N 4°23′43″W
- Manager: John Fallon
- League: West of Scotland League Premier Division
- 2025–26: West of Scotland League Premier Division, 8th of 16
- Website: https://arthurliefc.com/
Home colours

Arthurlie Football Club is a Scottish football club from Barrhead, East Renfrewshire. Based at Dunterlie Park, they play in the West of Scotland League Premier Division. The club played in the Scottish Football League in two spells, 1901 to 1915 and 1923 to 1929. They have won the Scottish Junior Cup twice, in 1937 and 1998.

== History ==
Arthurlie was founded in 1874 and played as a senior side until 1929. The club reached the quarter-finals of the Scottish Cup in three consecutive seasons from 1880–81, with their 1883 tie with Kilmarnock Athletic taking four games to settle. A notable early result was a 4–2 defeat of Celtic in the first round of the 1896–97 Scottish Cup. Celtic avenged this defeat with a 7–0 victory in Barrhead at the same stage the following season and the two clubs met again in Arthurlie's last Scottish Cup tie to date in 1929, with the Glasgow side winning 5–1 at Celtic Park.

With regard to league football, the club became a founder member of the Scottish Football Federation in 1891, winning that competition in its first year before joining the Scottish Football Alliance in 1893. Arthurlie obtained membership of the Scottish Football League in 1901 and achieved modest results in the Second Division, with a highest finish of joint second in 1906–07. That division ceased operations in 1915, during the First World War, but Arthurlie did not immediately rejoin the league after the war ended. They instead waited until 1923 to apply for membership of the newly created Third Division. Arthurlie immediately won the Third Division championship, and four reasonably successful seasons in the Second Division followed. Financial problems forced the club to resign its membership of the league with six games of the 1928–29 season to play. As the club had played all the promotion-chasing clubs, their results were allowed to stand.

The club was never formally disbanded, and indeed took part in the Scottish Amateur League in the 1929-30 season managing to complete their league programme undefeated. The local support was such that the club decided to enter the Western Intermediate League. Bottom place with only six wins all season didn't deter the club from joining the new Scottish Central Junior League in 1931-32. There was modest success in the first couple of seasons as a junior team but with the interest of local businessman Tommy Arrighi and the arrival of school teacher Tommy Taylor as match secretary the club began its upward trajectory. They found success quickly with a Scottish Junior Cup win in 1937 – defeating Kirkintilloch Rob Roy 5–1 in the final in front of a crowd of 23,000 at Celtic Park. Two unsuccessful final appearances followed, against Fauldhouse United in 1946, then derby rivals Pollok in 1981, before they lifted the trophy again in 1998, taking revenge on Pollok with a 4–0 victory in the final at Fir Park with strikes from Mark McLaughlin, Johnny Millar, Steven Convery and Steven Nugent.

In the Junior Super League era, the club were the first ever winners of the second tier West of Scotland Super League First Division in 2003 and enjoyed an unbroken 15 seasons in the West of Scotland Super League Premier Division until relegation to the newly configured SJFA West Region Championship in 2018.

The club's most recent trophy success was in the 2015 West of Scotland Cup final, defeating Kilwinning Rangers 4–2 at Newlandsfield Park, with goals from Gary Smith (3), and Ryan McGregor. It was Arthurlie's sixth victory in the West of Scotland Cup, a feat equalled by Pollok in 2017 and only Auchinleck Talbot (12) and Irvine Meadow (9), have won the tournament more often.

The team were managed by former Scotland Junior international defender, Duncan Sinclair, who joined the club from Larkhall Thistle in June 2018. Sinclair has also previously managed Shotts Bon Accord, Kilsyth Rangers and Lanark United. He was Arthurlie's ninth manager since 2010.

On 15 April 2020, Andy McFadyen become the club's new manager. He led the team to an invincible season in the West of Scotland League Conference B but just before the start of the 2022-23 season, he resigned due to work commitments.

On 18 July 2022, Craig Palmer was appointed as new manager..The team struggled and eventually Craig Palmer left the club by mutual agreement. Colin Reilly took over and led the club to safety. The following season Reilly led the club to its fifth Scottish Junior Cup Final where they were defeated by a late goal from Darvel FC. In spite of a fine late season league run, the club was relegated from the West of Scotland League Premier Division.

In the 2024-25 season Colin Reilly set his sights on winning the title and good progress was being made towards that when he left the club by "mutual agreement" in March 2025. Kevin Rutkiewicz stepped in for the run in which included a brutal programme of five games in eleven days. However, the team survived the run in and went on to win the title and promotion back into the Premier League. Rutkiewicz resigned on the last day of the season for personal reasons and was immediately replaced by Willie Dyer in June 2025.

With the club struggling financially, Willie Dyer left the club by mutual consent, and was replaced by John Fallon in September 2026

== Scottish Junior Cup finals record ==
Season	Opponent	Result
1936–37	Kirkintilloch Rob Roy	5–1
1945–46	Fauldhouse United	0–2
1980–81	Pollok	0–1
1997–98	Pollok	4–0
2023–24	Darvel	1–2

== Ground ==
In the 1860s there is mention of an Arthurlie Cricket Club who played their cricket on a piece of ground near Cross Arthurlie Farm which is about five minutes' walk from the present ground. It's likely that's where Arthurlie first played football. For a time, Arthurlie played in what is now a housing scheme and it was near a small ferm toon named Arthurston. Since the word "lee" can mean 'field' it's just possible that the name came from there but nobody really knows.This was located in Rufflees Avenue. Barrhead is famous for Shanks. The company began here. For a spell, Arthurlie played on land belonging to Shanks (3) who eventually needed the land for their expansion. Fortunately, a local worthy provided the land on which the ground now stands. This is therefore not the ground where Arthurlie defeated Celtic 4-2 in their historic Scottish Cup victory. However, Celtic did play the opening game here on Monday 22nd August 1921 winning 3-1. The ground was built on what was once reservoirs for a printworks. Drainage then and even today has always been a challenge. With a river running behind the ground and the run off from the Fereneze Braes, maintaining the ground has always been a challenge. It becomes heavy in the winter months and, with the low sun, one side of the pitch can be frozen solid while the rest of the pitch is playable. Originally, the ground was surrounded by corrugated iron sheets round the perimeter. Entry could be from the top or bottom of the ground. There was covering in the early days but it was sold to a club in Ayrshire, possibly Ardeer Thistle. The replacement covered area dates from the 1960s and may well have been covered with asbestos sheets at one time. The area at the station end is where the changing rooms were. By the 1960s they were leaking badly and the floors were rotten. A fire didn't help either and it may be that the club lost some old documents at that time. In the 80s the changing rooms were replaced with what were, essentially wooden huts and players entered the field through the crowds! By 1994 the club had managed to secure funds for a new £30,000 clubhouse which was relocated to the Levern end of the ground. Additional modular buildings were added in the 2000s. Over the years a move to a new ground has been mooted several times. In 2025 club members voted overwhelmingly in favour of a move to an area behind the retail park in Glasgow Road. The aim is to open the new ground in time for the 2027-28 season.

== Honours ==
=== League ===
- Scottish Football League
  - Division Three champions 1923–24
- Scottish Federation
  - Champions 1891–92
- Scottish Combination
  - Champions 1900–01
- SJFA West Region
  - Division One champions 2002–03
- Central Junior League
  - Premier Division champions 1987–88, 1988–89, 1993–94, 2000–01
  - Western Division champions 1936–37
  - Division B champions 1942–43
- West of Scotland Football League
  - Conference A winners: 2021–22
  - First Division winners: 2024–25

=== Cup ===
- Scottish Junior Cup
  - Winners: 1936–37, 1997–98
  - Runners-up: 1945–46, 1980–81, 2023–24
- Scottish Consolation Cup
  - Winners 1910
- Western League
  - League Cup winners 1924
- Renfrewshire FA Challenge Cup
  - Winners 1881, 1882
- Renfrewshire Junior FA Challenge Cup
  - Winners – 1934, 1945, 1950, 1951, 1955, 1956, 1957
- West of Scotland Challenge Cup
  - Winners 1943, 1976, 1978, 1997, 2011, 2015
- Renfrewshire & Dumbartonshire Cup
  - Winners 1934, 1951, 1955, 1957, 1960
- Evening Times Trophy
  - Winners 1937, 1946
- Evening Times Cup Winners Trophy
  - Winners 1987, 1989, 1994, 1995, 2001, 2011
- Central Junior League
  - League Cup winners 1939, 1987, 1991, 1997, 1998, 2003, 2008
  - Sectional League Cup winners 1979, 1987, 2009, 2010
- JC Alan Challenge Cup:
  - Winners 2012
  - Champions League winners 1972, 1985

== See also ==
- Barrhead Rangers, another senior club in town, which Arthurlie took over in 1880
