= 1962–63 Celtic F.C. season =

Celtic
1962–63 season
- Manager: Jimmy McGrory
- Stadium: Celtic Park
- Scottish Division One: 4th
- Scottish Cup: Finalists
- Scottish League Cup: Group stage
- Inter-Cities Fairs Cup: First round

During the 1962–63 Scottish football season, Celtic competed in Scottish Division One.

Celtic reached the Scottish Cup final, where they were defeated by Rangers. The club also reached the final of the Glasgow Cup, where they lost to Third Lanark.

== Competitions ==
=== Scottish Division One ===
==== League table ====
Pos	Team	Pld	W	D	L	GF	GA	GR	Pts
2	Kilmarnock	34	20	8	6	92	40	2.300	48
3	Partick Thistle	34	20	6	8	66	44	1.500	46
4	Celtic	34	19	6	9	76	44	1.727	44
5	Hearts	34	17	9	8	85	59	1.441	43
6	Aberdeen	34	17	7	10	70	47	1.489	41

Source: RSSSF

==== Matches ====
22 August 1962 Division One	Falkirk	1–3	Celtic	Falkirk
19:30 GMT	Hamilton	Report	Jackson 11'; Bryne 19'; Hughes 59'	Stadium: Brockville Park; Attendance: 6,165; Referee: John Gordon

8 September 1962 Division One	Celtic	0–1	Rangers	Glasgow
15:00		Report	Henderson	Stadium: Celtic Park; Attendance: 71,116; Referee: J Stewart

15 September 1962 Division One	Clyde	1–3	Celtic	Glasgow
15:00	Currie	Report	Divers 10'; Divers 13'; Chalmers 17'	Stadium: Shawfield Stadium; Attendance: 20,071; Referee: A Crossman

22 September 1962 Division One	Celtic	1–2	Aberdeen	Glasgow
15:00 GMT	Hughes 49'	Report	Cooke 10'; Cummings 18'	Stadium: Celtic Park; Attendance: 28,403; Referee: W.L Fyffe

29 September 1962 Division One	Raith Rovers	0–2	Celtic	Kirkcaldy
15:00 BST		Report	Murdoch 30'; McNeill 77' (pen.)	Stadium: Stark's Park; Attendance: 9,099; Referee: W.J Allan

6 October 1962 Division One	Celtic	1–1	Kilmarnock	Glasgow
15:00 BST	Carroll 47'	Report	Kerr 55'	Stadium: Celtic Park; Attendance: 36,407; Referee: A.F.J Webster

13 October 1962 Division One	Motherwell	0–2	Celtic	Glasgow
15:00 BST		Report	Gallagher 59'; Carroll 69'	Stadium: Celtic Park; Attendance: 18,386; Referee: D.W Spiers

20 October 1962 Division One	Celtic	1–0	Dundee United	Glasgow
15:00 BST	Chalmers 35'	Report		Stadium: Celtic Park; Attendance: 20,246; Referee: W.J Mullen

27 October 1962 Division One	Airdrieonians	1–6	Celtic	Airdrie
15:00 BST			Divers 41'; Craig 63'; Chalmers 65'; Craig 66'; Divers 74'; Gallagher 88'	Stadium: Broomfield Park; Attendance: 9,836

3 November 1962 Division One	St Mirren	0–7	Celtic	Paisley
15:00 BST			Chalmers 22'; Divers 29'; Chalmers 45'; MacKay 56'; Chalmers 65'; Price 80'; Gallagher 89'	Stadium: St Mirren Park, Love Street; Attendance: 24,222

10 November 1962 Division One	Celtic	0–1	Queen of the South	Glasgow
15:00 GMT				Stadium: Celtic Park; Attendance: 27,775

17 November 1962 Division One	Dundee	0–0	Celtic	Edinburgh
15:00 GMT				Stadium: Easter Road; Attendance: 16,951

24 November 1962 Division One	Celtic	0–2	Partick Thistle	Glasgow
15:00 GMT				Stadium: Celtic Park; Attendance: 38,966

1 December 1962 Division One	Hibernian	1–1	Celtic	Edinburgh
15:00 GMT			Murdoch 75'	Stadium: Easter Road; Attendance: 15,748

8 December 1962 Division One	Celtic	2–2	Hearts	Glasgow
15:00 GMT	Hughes 5'; Price 42'			Stadium: Celtic Park; Attendance: 28,803

15 December 1962 Division One	Third Lanark	2–0	Celtic	Glasgow
15:00 GMT				Stadium: Cathkin Park; Attendance: 14,603

26 December 1962 Division One	Celtic	2–1	Dunfermline Athletic	Glasgow
15:00 GMT	OG 9'; Hughes 61'			Stadium: Celtic Park; Attendance: 17,233

29 December 1962 Division One	Celtic	2–1	Falkirk	Glasgow
15:00 GMT	Hughes 43'; Hughes 53'			Stadium: Celtic Park; Attendance: 16,998

1 January 1963 Division One	Rangers	4–0	Celtic	Glasgow
15:00 GMT				Stadium: Ibrox Park; Attendance: 76,147

5 January 1963 Division One	Aberdeen	1–5	Celtic	Aberdeen
15:00 GMT			Hughes 14'; Craig 18'; Craig 29'; Hughes 33'; Hughes 82'	Stadium: Pittodrie Park; Attendance: 15,370

2 March 1963 Division One	Celtic	3–1	Airdrieonians	Glasgow
15:00 GMT	Divers 13'; Divers 61'; OG 62'			Stadium: Celtic Park; Attendance: 22,097

9 March 1963 Division One	Celtic	1–1	St Mirren	Glasgow
15:00 GMT	Murdoch 25'			Stadium: Celtic Park; Attendance: 24,239

16 March 1963 Division One	Queen of the South	2–5	Celtic	Dumfries
15:00 GMT				Stadium: Palmerston Park; Attendance: 7,429

19 March 1963 Division One	Celtic	4–1	Raith Rovers	Glasgow
19:30 GMT				Stadium: Celtic Park; Attendance: 7,974

23 March 1963 Division One	Celtic	4–1	Dundee	Glasgow
15:00 GMT				Stadium: Celtic Park; Attendance: 40,710

27 March 1963 Division One	Kilmarnock	6–0	Celtic	Kilmarnock
19:30 GMT				Stadium: Rugby Park; Attendance: 16,002

2 April 1963 Division One	Partick Thistle	1–5	Celtic	Glasgow
19:30 GMT				Stadium: Firhill Park; Attendance: 16,649

6 April 1963 Division One	Celtic	2–0	Hibernian	Glasgow
15:00 GMT				Stadium: Celtic Park; Attendance: 13,608

20 April 1963 Division One	Celtic	2–1	Third Lanark	Glasgow
15:00 BST				Stadium: Celtic Park; Attendance: 12,926

27 April 1963 Division One	Dunfermline Athletic	1–1	Celtic	Dunfermline
15:00 GMT			Divers 21'	Stadium: East End Park; Attendance: 10,059

29 April 1963 Division One	Hearts	4–3	Celtic	Edinburgh
15:00 BST				Stadium: Tynecastle Park; Attendance: 9,673

6 May 1963 Division One	Celtic	2–0	Clyde	Glasgow
19:30 BST				Stadium: Celtic Park; Attendance: 6,743

11 May 1963 Division One	Dundee United	3–0	Celtic	Dundee
15:00 BST				Stadium: Tannadice Park; Attendance: 12,656

13 May 1963 Division One	Celtic	6–0	Motherwell	Glasgow
15:00 BST				Stadium: Celtic Park; Attendance: 4,692

=== Scottish Cup ===
28 January 1963 First round	Falkirk	0–2	Celtic	Falkirk
19:30 GMT				Stadium: Brockville Park; Attendance: 13,500

6 March 1963 Second round	Celtic	3–1	Hearts	Glasgow
19:30 GMT				Stadium: Celtic Park; Attendance: 38,000

13 March 1963 Third round	Celtic	6–0	Gala Fairydean	Glasgow
19:30 GMT				Stadium: Celtic Park; Attendance: 14,000

30 March 1963 Fourth round	St Mirren	0–1	Celtic	Paisley
15:00 GMT				Stadium: St Mirren Park, Love Street; Attendance: 35,644

13 April 1963 Semi-final	Raith Rovers	2–5	Celtic	Glasgow
15:00 GMT				Stadium: Ibrox Park; Attendance: 35,681

4 May 1963 Final	Rangers	1–1	Celtic	Glasgow
15:00 GMT				Stadium: Hampden Park; Attendance: 129,527

15 May 1963 Final replay	Rangers	3–0	Celtic	Glasgow
19:30 GMT				Stadium: Hampden Park; Attendance: 120,263

=== Scottish League Cup ===
11 August 1962 Group 8	Celtic	3–1	Hearts	Glasgow
15:00 GMT				Stadium: Celtic Park; Attendance: 38,868

15 August 1962 Group 8	Dundee	1–0	Celtic	Dundee
19:30 GMT				Stadium: Dens Park; Attendance: 19,807

18 August 1962 Group 8	Celtic	4–0	Dundee United	Glasgow
15:00 GMT				Stadium: Celtic Park; Attendance: 34,383

25 August 1962 Group 8	Hearts	3–2	Celtic	Edinburgh
15:00 GMT				Stadium: Tynecastle Park; Attendance: 31,296

29 August 1962 Group 8	Celtic	3–0	Dundee	Glasgow
19:30 GMT				Stadium: Celtic Park; Attendance: 28,3165

1 September 1962 Group 8	Dundee United	0–0	Celtic	Dundee
19:30 GMT				Stadium: Dens Park; Attendance: 20,327

=== Inter-Cities Fairs Cup ===
26 September 1962 1st round 1st leg	Valencia (Spain)	4–2	(Scotland) Celtic	Valencia
20:00 GMT				Stadium: Mestalla Stadium; Attendance: 25,000

24 October 1962 1st round 2nd leg	Celtic (Scotland)	2–2 (4–6 agg.)	(Spain) Valencia	Glasgow
19:30 GMT				Stadium: Celtic Park; Attendance: 45,000

=== Glasgow Cup ===
15 October 1962 1st round	Rangers	2–2	Celtic	Glasgow
19:30 BST				Stadium: Ibrox Park; Attendance: 50,000

21 November 1962 1st round replay	Celtic	3–2	Rangers	Glasgow
14:30 GMT				Stadium: Celtic Park; Attendance: 24,000

3 December 1962 Semi-final	Partick Thistle	1–3	Celtic	Glasgow
19:30 GMT				Stadium: Firhill Park; Attendance: 28,500

8 April 1963 Final	Celtic	1–2	Third Lanark	Glasgow
19:30 BST				Stadium: Hampden Park
