= 1962–63 Heart of Midlothian F.C. season =

Heart of Midlothian
1962–63 season
- Manager: Tommy Walker
- Stadium: Tynecastle Park
- Scottish First Division: 5th
- Scottish Cup: Round 2
- League Cup: Winners

During the 1962–63 season Hearts competed in the Scottish First Division, the Scottish Cup, the Scottish League Cup.

== Fixtures ==
=== Friendlies ===
25 September 1962 Friendly	SK Brann	4–0	Hearts	Brann Stadion
	Goal			Attendance: 10,500

5 November 1962 Willie Bauld Testimonial	Hearts	2–2	Sheffield United	Tynecastle Park
	Goal			Attendance: 15,000

12 November 1962 Friendly	Hearts	8–2	SK Brann	Tynecastle Park
	Goal			Attendance: 10,000

6 December 1962 Friendly	Hearts	6–0	Moscow Torpedo	Tynecastle Park
	Goal			Attendance: 20,000

=== League Cup ===
11 August 1962 League Cup Group	Celtic	3–1	Hearts	Celtic Park
				Attendance: 38,868

15 August 1962 League Cup Group	Hearts	3–1	Dundee United	Tynecastle Park
				Attendance: 6,437

18 August 1962 League Cup Group	Dundee	0–2	Hearts	Dens Park
				Attendance: 19,075

25 August 1962 League Cup Group	Hearts	3–2	Celtic	Tynecastle Park
				Attendance: 31,296

29 August 1962 League Cup Group	Dundee United	2–0	Hearts	Tannadice Park
				Attendance: 10,726

1 September 1962 League Cup Group	Hearts	2–0	Dundee	Tynecastle Park
				Attendance: 18,843

12 September 1962 League Cup Quarter-Final 1st Leg	Morton	0–3	Hearts	Cappielow Park
				Attendance: 13,235

19 September 1962 League Cup Quarter-Final 2nd Leg	Hearts	3–1	Morton	Tynecastle Park
				Attendance: 12,304

10 October 1962 League Cup Semi-Final	St Joohnstone	0–4	Hearts	Easter Road
				Attendance: 22,265

27 October 1962 League Cup Final	Hearts	1–0	Kilmarnock	Hampden Park
				Attendance: 51,280

=== Scottish Cup ===
12 January 1963 Scottish Cup R1	Forfar Athletic	1–3	Hearts	Station Park
				Attendance: 4,500

6 March 1963 Scottish Cup R2	Celtic	3–1	Hearts	Celtic Park
				Attendance: 38,000

=== Scottish First Division ===
22 August 1962 Scottish First Division	Hearts	3–1	Dundee	Tynecastle Park
				Attendance: 14,399

8 September 1962 Scottish First Division	Hibernian	0–4	Hearts	Easter Road
				Attendance: 28,847

15 September 1962 Scottish First Division	Hearts	6–1	Airdrieonians	Tynecastle Park
				Attendance: 13,079

22 September 1962 Scottish First Division	Partick Thistle	3–4	Hearts	Tynecastle Park
				Attendance: 7,843

29 September 1962 Scottish First Division	Hearts	3–0	Queen of the South	Tynecastle Park
				Attendance: 16,726

6 October 1962 Scottish First Division	Dunfermline Athletic	2–2	Hearts	East End Park
				Attendance: 18,866

13 October 1962 Scottish First Division	Kilmarnock	2–2	Hearts	Rugby Park
				Attendance: 19,057

20 October 1962 Scottish First Division	Hearts	2–1	Motherwell	Tynecastle Park
				Attendance: 20,077

30 October 1962 Scottish First Division	Falkirk	2–0	Hearts	Brockville Park
				Attendance: 3,371

3 November 1962 Scottish First Division	Hearts	1–1	Aberdeen	Tynecastle Park
				Attendance: 15,248

10 November 1962 Scottish First Division	Hearts	1–1	Clyde	Tynecastle Park
				Attendance: 10,998

17 November 1962 Scottish First Division	Third Lanark	1–2	Hearts	Cathkin Park
				Attendance: 3,456

24 November 1962 Scottish First Division	Hearts	5–0	St Mirren	Tynecastle Park
				Attendance: 10,247

1 December 1962 Scottish First Division	Raith Rovers	0–3	Hearts	Stark's Park
				Attendance: 4,376

8 December 1962 Scottish First Division	Celtic	2–2	Hearts	Celtic Park
				Attendance: 28,803

15 December 1962 Scottish First Division	Hearts	2–2	Dundee United	Tynecastle Park
				Attendance: 8,808

9 March 1963 Scottish First Division	Aberdeen	2–1	Hearts	Pittodrie Park
				Attendance: 11,430

13 March 1963 Scottish First Division	Hearts	5–0	Falkirk	Tynecastle Park
				Attendance: 8,823

16 March 1963 Scottish First Division	Clyde	0–6	Hearts	Shawfield Stadium
				Attendance: 4,637

18 March 1963 Scottish First Division	Hearts	2–3	Kilmarnock	Tynecastle Park
				Attendance: 13,591

23 March 1963 Scottish First Division	Hearts	2–0	Third Lanark	Tynecastle Park
				Attendance: 12,099

27 March 1963 Scottish First Division	Hearts	0–5	Rangers	Tynecastle Park
				Attendance: 32,267

2 April 1963 Scottish First Division	St Mirren	7–3	Hearts	St Mirren Park, Love Street
				Attendance: 5,557

6 April 1963 Scottish First Division	Hearts	2–1	Raith Rovers	Tynecastle Park
				Attendance: 4,575

10 April 1963 Scottish First Division	Hearts	2–4	Partick Thistle	Tynecastle Park
				Attendance: 5,341

20 April 1963 Scottish First Division	Dundee United	0–0	Hearts	Tannadice Park
				Attendance: 8,511

24 April 1963 Scottish First Division	Queen of the South	0–3	Hearts	Palmerston Park
				Attendance: 5,394

27 April 1963 Scottish First Division	Rangers	5–1	Hearts	Tynecastle Park
				Attendance: 37,886

29 April 1963 Scottish First Division	Hearts	4–3	Celtic	Tynecastle Park
				Attendance: 9,673

4 May 1963 Scottish First Division	Hearts	3–3	Hibernian	Tynecastle Park
				Attendance: 15,538

6 May 1963 Scottish First Division	Dundee	2–2	Hearts	Dens Park
				Attendance: 9,141

11 May 1963 Scottish First Division	Motherwell	1–3	Hearts	Fir Park
				Attendance: 4,700

13 May 1963 Scottish First Division	Airdrieonians	4–2	Hearts	Broomfield Park
				Attendance: 1,784

18 May 1963 Scottish First Division	Hearts	2–0	Dunfermline Athletic	Tynecastle Park
				Attendance: 5,665

== See also ==
- List of Heart of Midlothian F.C. seasons
