= 1964 Scottish League Cup final =

- Event: 1964–65 Scottish League Cup
| Rangers | Celtic |
| 2 | 1 |
- Date: 24 October 1964
- Venue: Hampden Park, Glasgow
- Attendance: 91,423

In association football, the 1964 Scottish League Cup final was played on 24 October 1964 at Hampden Park in Glasgow and it was the final of the 19th Scottish League Cup competition. The final was an Old Firm derby contested by Rangers and Celtic. Rangers won the match 2–1, with Jim Forrest scoring both of the Rangers goals. Jim Baxter was the Rangers captain that day, Jim Kennedy was the Celtic captain.

Forrest had also scored both of the Rangers goals in their semi-final victory against Dundee United.

== Match details ==
24 October 1964

| Rangers | 2–1 | Celtic |
|---|---|---|
| Forrest | | Johnstone |

Hampden Park, Glasgow
Attendance: 91,423

RANGERS:
| GK | Billy Ritchie |
| FB | David Provan |
| FB | Eric Caldow |
| RH | John Greig |
| CH | Ron McKinnon |
| LH | Wilson Wood |
| RW | Ralph Brand |
| IF | Jimmy Millar |
| CF | Jim Forrest |
| IF | Jim Baxter (c) |
| LW | Willie Johnston |
Manager:
Scot Symon

CELTIC:
| GK | John Fallon |
| FB | Ian Young |
| FB | Tommy Gemmell |
| RH | John Clark |
| CH | John Cushley |
| LH | Jim Kennedy (c) |
| RW | Jimmy Johnstone |
| IF | Bobby Murdoch |
| CF | Stevie Chalmers |
| IF | John Divers |
| LW | John Hughes |
Manager:
Jimmy McGrory
