= 1962–63 Dundee United F.C. season =

Dundee United
1962–63 season
- Chairman: J. Johnston-Grant
- Manager: Jerry Kerr
- Stadium: Tannadice Park
- Scottish First Division: 7th W15 D11 L8 F67 A57 P41
- Scottish Cup: Semi-Finalists
- League Cup: Group stage

The 1962–63 season was the 55th year of football played by Dundee United, and covers the period from 1 July 1962 to 30 June 1963. United finished in seventh place in the First Division.

== Match results ==
Dundee United played a total of 48 competitive matches during the 1962–63 season.

=== Legend ===
Win
Draw
Loss

All results are written with Dundee United's score first. Own goals in italics

=== First Division ===
Date	Opponent	Venue	Result	Attendance	Scorers
22 August 1962	Dunfermline Athletic	H	0-4	9,388	
8 September 1962	Queen of the South	A	0-1	5,945	
15 September 1962	Dundee	H	1-1	15,627	
22 September 1962	Third Lanark	A	1-1	3,912	
29 September 1962	Hibernian	H	5-0	8,333	
6 October 1962	Partick Thistle	A	0-3	8,167	
13 October 1962	St Mirren	H	1-1	8,680	
20 October 1962	Celtic	A	0-1	20,246	
27 October 1962	Raith Rovers	H	8-1	5,091	
3 November 1962	Motherwell	A	0-0	5,548	
10 November 1962	Rangers	H	2-1	21,391	
17 November 1962	Clyde	A	3-1	1,882	
24 November 1962	Kilmarnock	H	3-3	10,934	
1 December 1962	Falkirk	A	1-4	4,641	
8 December 1962	Aberdeen	H	3-3	10,053	
15 December 1962	Heart of Midlothian	A	2-2	8,888	
22 December 1962	Airdrieonians	H	3-1	6,980	
1 January 1963	Queen of the South	H	2-1	4,645	
2 March 1963	Raith Rovers	A	7-2	3,714	
9 March 1963	Motherwell	H	2-1	9,506	
16 March 1963	Rangers	A	0-5	25,795	
23 March 1963	Clyde	H	4-1	5,610	
25 March 1963	Dunfermline Athletic	A	2-1	5,178	
6 April 1963	Falkirk	H	1-0	4,384	
17 April 1963	Dundee	A	2-1	14,967	
20 April 1963	Heart of Midlothian	H	0-0	8,511	
24 April 1963	Hibernian	A	1-1	4,801	
27 April 1963	Airdrieonians	A	2-4	1,950	
29 April 1963	Third Lanark	H	1-0	4,141	
1 May 1963	Kilmarnock	A	2-2	4,505	
3 May 1963	St Mirren	A	1-2	4,956	
7 May 1963	Aberdeen	A	2-1	5,193	
11 May 1963	Celtic	H	3-0	12,656	
18 May 1963	Partick Thistle	H	2-2	7,726	

=== Scottish Cup ===
Date	Rd	Opponent	Venue	Result	Attendance	Scorers
26 January 1963	R1	Albion Rovers	H	3-0	12,000	
2 February 1963	R2	Ayr United	A	2-1	4,787	
11 March 1963	R3	Queen's Park	A	1-1	2,611	
20 March 1963	R3 R	Queen's Park	H	3-1	9,000	
29 March 1963	R4	Queen of the South	H	1-1	12,000	
3 April 1963	R4 R	Queen of the South	A	1-1	11,041	
8 April 1963	R4 2R	Queen of the South	H	4-0	4,500	
13 April 1963	SF	Rangers	N	2-5	56,391	

=== League Cup ===
Date	Rd	Opponent	Venue	Result	Attendance	Scorers
11 August 1962	G2	Dundee	H	3-2	22,917	
15 August 1962	G2	Heart of Midlothian	A	1-3	6,437	
18 August 1962	G2	Celtic	A	0-4	34,383	
25 August 1962	G2	Dundee	A	1-2	18,493	
29 August 1962	G2	Heart of Midlothiann	H	2-0	10,726	
1 September 1962	G2	Celtic	H	0-0	20,327	

== See also ==
- 1962–63 in Scottish football
