= Jimmy Millar (footballer, born 1934) =

Scottish footballer (1934–2022)

Personal information
- Date of birth: 20 November 1934
- Place of birth: Edinburgh, Scotland
- Date of death: 20 October 2022 (aged 87)
- Position: Centre forward

Youth career
- 1950–1952: Merchiston Thistle

Senior career*
Years	Team	Apps	(Gls)
1952–1955	Dunfermline Athletic	43	(22)
1955–1967	Rangers	197	(91)
1967–1969	Dundee United	18	(3)
Total		258	(117)

International career
1961–1964	Scottish Football League XI	4	(3)
1963	Scotland	2	(0)

Managerial career
- 1969–1970: Raith Rovers
- * Club domestic league appearances and goals

James Millar (20 November 1934 – 20 October 2022) was a Scottish professional footballer who played for Dunfermline Athletic, Rangers, Dundee United and the Scotland national team, mainly as a centre forward.

== Club career ==
Born in Edinburgh, Millar was signed by Rangers manager Scot Symon for £5000 on 12 January 1955 from Dunfermline Athletic, where he had played as a half back and also played in that position on a number of occasions in the early seasons of his career at Ibrox. Millar achieved more success when he played at centre forward in a pre-season tour of America and started scoring goals regularly. Millar was an integral part of the Rangers team of the early 1960s, alongside players such as Bobby Shearer, Eric Caldow, Davie Wilson, John Greig, Jim Baxter and Alex Scott. Millar had a highly successful strike partnership with fellow Edinburgh native Ralph Brand during this time. Despite not being particularly tall, he was renowned for his heading ability and bravery.

Millar's total of 30 goals in the Scottish Cup is a post-war record for Rangers, equalled only by Derek Johnstone, and on two occasions he scored twice in Scottish Cup finals, in 1960 and 1964, another record equalled only by Johnstone. Millar was also the first ever substitute to come on for Rangers, replacing Jim Forrest during a 5–0 victory over Falkirk in a league match at Ibrox in October 1966.

Millar was also known for his scoring record against Rangers' arch-rivals Celtic, with 13 goals in Old Firm matches, including two winning goals at Celtic Park in the traditional New Year's Day fixture, in 1960 and 1964. Millar made 317 appearances (197 in the league) for Rangers, scoring 162 goals (91 in the league) and also won three Championships, five Scottish Cups and three Scottish League Cups.

In the summer of 1967, Millar left Rangers for Dundee United and became manager of Raith Rovers for a brief spell after retiring, before owning a pub in Leith.

Millar is a member of the Rangers Hall of Fame.

== International career ==
Millar earned two caps for Scotland in 1963 during his spell with Rangers. He also featured four times for the Scottish Football League XI, scoring three goals.

== Illness and death ==
In 2017, his family revealed that for the past decade Millar had been suffering from dementia, a condition they believed to be linked to his heading a football. Millar died on 20 October 2022, at the age of 87.

== Honours ==
Rangers

- Scottish League championship: 1960–61, 1962–63, 1963–64
- Scottish Cup: 1959–60, 1961–62, 1962–63, 1963–64, 1965–66
- Scottish League Cup: 1960–61, 1961–62, 1964–65
- UEFA Cup Winners' Cup runner-up: 1960–61
