= Ronnie McKinnon =

Scottish footballer (1940–2023)

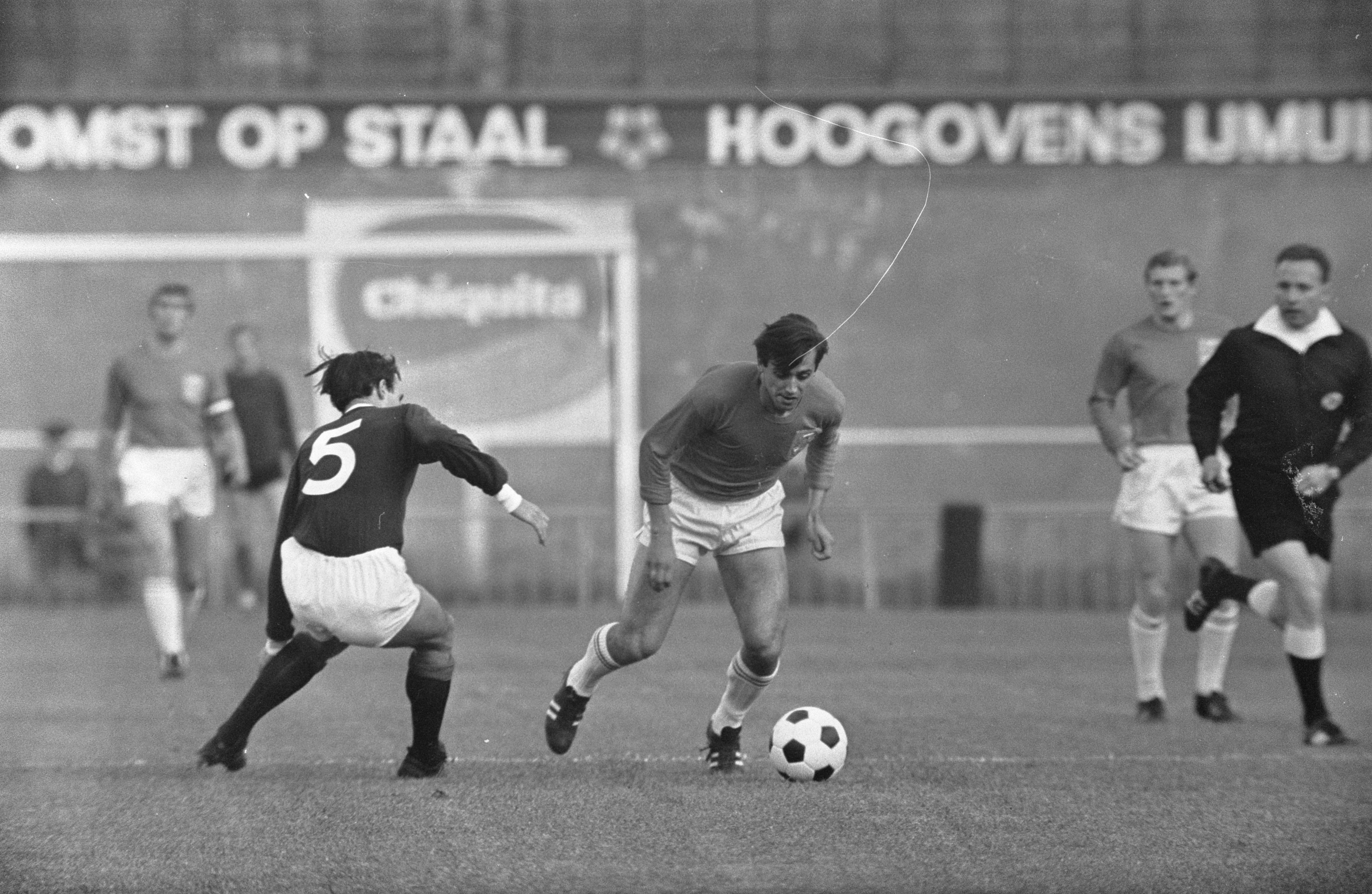
- McKinnon (left) duelling with Willy van der Kuijlen (1968)

Personal information
- Full name: Ronald MacKinnon
- Date of birth: 20 August 1940
- Place of birth: Glasgow, Scotland
- Date of death: 17 September 2023 (aged 83)
- Place of death: Stornoway, Scotland
- Position: Central defender

Youth career
- Benburb
- Dunipace

Senior career*
Years	Team	Apps	(Gls)
1960–1972	Rangers	301	(2)
1973	Durban United		

International career
1965–1971	Scotland	28	(1)
1966–1971	Scottish League XI	9	(0)
1968	Scotland U23	1	(0)
- * Club domestic league appearances and goals

Ronald MacKinnon (20 August 1940 – 17 September 2023), known as Ronnie McKinnon, was a Scottish professional footballer who played for Rangers and the Scotland national team.

== Club career ==
McKinnon, a central defender who had been a winger in his youth during early spells at Junior level, made his Rangers debut against Hearts on 8 March 1961 in a 3–0 win at Ibrox. He went on to make 487 appearances for the club in all competitions between 1961 and 1971, winning two Scottish League championships, four Scottish Cups and three League Cups.

His final Rangers appearance was in the 1971–72 European Cup Winners' Cup second round match against Sporting CP in Lisbon, where he suffered a broken leg. Rangers went on to win the Cup Winners' Cup that season but McKinnon, who had been a regular for a decade but was already in the latter stages of his career, was put out of action entirely for a year due to the complications of the injury and the poor manner in which it was treated.

== International career ==
McKinnon won a total of 28 caps for Scotland, making his debut in a 1–0 win over Italy at Hampden Park in 1965, in which Rangers teammate John Greig had scored a memorable late winner. He also played in the 3–2 win over England at Wembley in 1967. His only goal for Scotland came in a 3–2 win over Wales, also in 1967. He also represented the Scottish League XI.

== Later and personal life ==
After leaving Rangers in 1973, McKinnon moved to South Africa, where he played local football for a season. He later returned to Scotland and settled on the Isle of Lewis where his mother was born and where he had spent time as a child during World War II.

His connection to Rangers continued as he was an Honorary Member & Ambassador of The Lewis & Harris Rangers Supporters Club, and travelled to matches at Ibrox with the island fans at least once a season.

McKinnon's twin brother Donnie was also a professional footballer, spending 14 seasons with Partick Thistle as a centre-half. He was also one of the coaches for the Scotland national team for many years.

=== Death ===
McKinnon died on 17 September 2023, at the age of 83.

== Honours ==
Rangers

- Scottish League First Division: 1962–63, 1963–64
- Scottish Cup: 1961–62, 1962–63, 1963–64, 1965–66
- Scottish League Cup: 1963–64, 1964–65, 1970–71
- European Cup Winners' Cuprunner-up: 1966–67

Scotland

- British Home Championship: 1966–67
