= Willie Johnston =

Scottish footballer (born 1946)

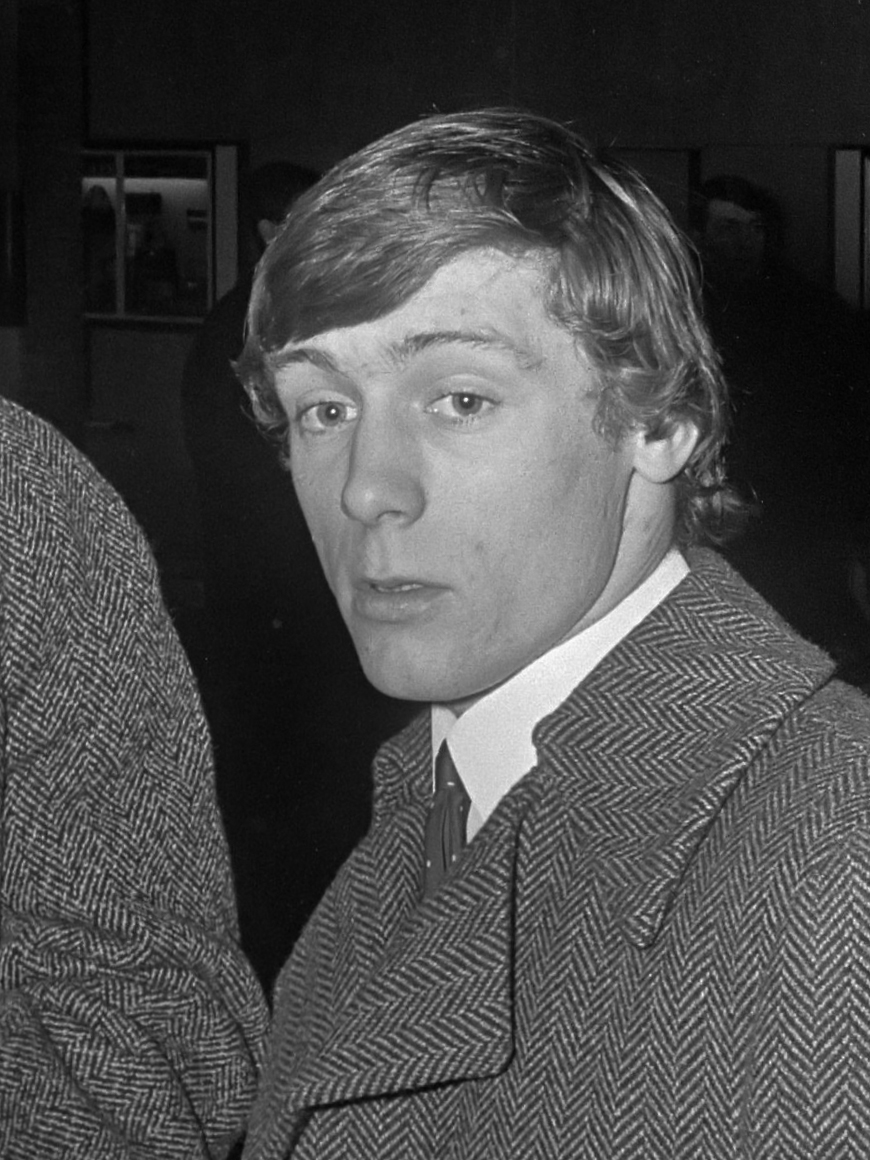

Personal information
- Full name: William McClure Johnston
- Date of birth: 19 December 1946 (age 79)
- Place of birth: Maryhill, Glasgow, Scotland
- Height: 5 ft 7 in (1.70 m)
- Position: Outside left

Youth career
- 1962–1964: Rangers
- 1962–1964: → Lochore Welfare (loan)

Senior career*
Years	Team	Apps	(Gls)
1964–1972	Rangers	211	(89)
1972	Hakoah Sydney		
1972–1979	West Bromwich Albion	207	(18)
1979	Vancouver Whitecaps	41	(3)
1979–1980	→ Birmingham City (loan)	15	(0)
1980–1982	Rangers	35	(2)
1982	Vancouver Whitecaps	18	(0)
1982–1985	Heart of Midlothian	58	(9)
1983	→ South China AA (loan)		
1985	East Fife	3	(0)
Total		585	(124)

International career
1965–1978	Scotland	22	(0)
1969–1970	Scottish League XI	2	(1)
1969–1970	Scotland U23	2	(0)
- * Club domestic league appearances and goals

William McClure Johnston (born 19 December 1946) is a Scottish former professional footballer. He played over 600 games in a 20-year senior playing career. His 5 Rangers major trophy wins included him scoring 2 goals when winning the 1972 European Cup Winners' Cup final. Johnston also played for Hakoah Sydney, West Bromwich Albion, Vancouver Whitecaps, Birmingham City, Heart of Midlothian, South China AA and East Fife. With the Whitecaps he was part of the Soccer Bowl '79 winning team. His 22 full Scotland caps included against Peru at the 1978 FIFA World Cup. He was sent home from the competition early after subsequently testing positive for Reactivan in that game.

== Career ==
=== First spell at Rangers ===
Born in Glasgow but raised in Fife and known by the nickname 'Bud', Johnston began his career at local Junior club Lochore Welfare, also signing schoolboy forms with Rangers. He joined the Gers full-time in 1964 aged 17 and soon made his debut against St Johnstone in the Scottish League Cup on 29 August 1964. Two months later, following injury to the established outside left Davie Wilson, Johnston was named in the side for the final of that competition and received his first winner's medal after a 2–1 Old Firm victory over Celtic. He was befriended by one of the team's key players, fellow Fife native Jim Baxter.

The following season, Rangers and Celtic shared a cup triumph each, beating the other in the finals; Celtic gained revenge in the League Cup before Rangers won the 1965–66 Scottish Cup 1–0 in a replay, with Wilson playing at inside left in the matches to accommodate both him and Johnston in the team. Ten days before the League Cup Final, on 13 October 1965, Johnston had made his debut for Scotland in a World Cup qualifying fixture against Poland, aged just 18; the match would end with disappointment in a 2–1 home defeat, the opponents scoring both their goals in the last five minutes.

In the 1966 Scottish League Cup Final between the same sides, it was Celtic who prevailed by another 1–0 scoreline. Johnston also played in the surprise Scottish Cup defeat to Berwick Rangers in January 1967, suffering a broken ankle, but recovered from the injury in time for the European Cup Winners' Cup Final on 31 May, in which Rangers lost out 1–0 to Bayern Munich.

Over the next three seasons, Johnston's personal output included 65 goals from 137 appearances (as well as four caps for Scotland), but this yielded only one minor Glasgow Cup win during the period; arch-rivals Celtic had begun a period of dominance at that time, and overwhelmed Rangers 4–0 in the 1969 Scottish Cup Final less than a month after Johnston had scored a hat-trick against them in a cup tie at Celtic Park. There was further disappointment as the club was twice eliminated from the latter stages of the Inter-Cities Fairs Cup by English opponents, both of whom went on to win the trophy (Leeds United in 1968, Newcastle United in 1969). Johnston missed the home leg against Newcastle through suspension after he was sent off in the previous round against Athletic Bilbao.

Celtic's domination of the Scottish league continued into the 1970s, and ultimately Johnston would end his spell at Ibrox without a championship medal. The 1970 Scottish League Cup Final went Rangers' way 1–0 over the familiar opponents, Johnston providing the cross for the winning goal, but he was fined afterwards by manager Willie Waddell for showboating (sitting on the ball), which supposedly brought shame on the club. The final of the 1970–71 Scottish Cup, yet another Old Firm clash, was won by Celtic after a replay. A major off-field tragedy had also befallen Rangers that year when 66 supporters died in a disaster at the stadium.

Johnston scored twice in the final as Rangers won the European Cup-Winners' Cup in 1971–72 by defeating Dynamo Moscow 3–2 in Barcelona. By that time he was often playing as a striker alongside Colin Stein (the other scorer in the final) as formations were modified.

=== West Bromwich and later years ===
On 1 December 1972 Johnston joined a struggling West Bromwich Albion who were 1 point above England's top tier relegation positions. Albion paid a then club record £138,000. He debuted against Liverpool that month. Johnston ended his first season in England with relegation to the Second Division. West Brom remained there for three seasons before winning promotion at the end of the 1975–76 Football League season. He was not selected for the Scotland 1974 FIFA World Cup squad. Indeed, he was not capped at all in between November 1970 and April 1977.

His career included some controversial incidents. Widely regarded as possessing a short temper to match his quickness and skill, he was sent off over 20 times in his career. His move to West Brom came in the wake of a two-month ban for punching an opponent. After Scotland's opening game against Peru in the 1978 World Cup in Argentina, Johnston tested positive for a banned stimulant contained in Reactivan, a medication prescribed for his hay fever. His subsequent expulsion from the squad ended his international career after 22 appearances, (Note: Johnston's SFA profile gives him 21 appearances, but other sources all give 22 caps, with the 'extra' match against Wales in the 1976–77 British Home Championship where he came on as a substitute.) although he maintained his innocence. A year earlier, having been provoked by his opponent, he had been shown a red card for violent conduct in a friendly against Argentina on his last visit to that nation.

While playing for the Vancouver Whitecaps, he once mooned the Seattle Sounders bench following a goal, and on another occasion took a swig from a fan's beer before taking a corner kick in San Jose, setting up a goal from the set-piece. Johnston was a key member of the 1979 NASL champion Vancouver Whitecaps alongside the likes of English World Cup winner Alan Ball, helping them defeat the New York Cosmos in the semi-final, and then the Tampa Bay Rowdies 2–1 in Soccer Bowl '79.

Johnston returned to Rangers in 1980 to play under former teammate John Greig. During a game at Ibrox that year, Aberdeen player John McMaster had to be given the kiss of life after Johnston stamped on his throat, often listed as one of the reasons for the development of the rivalry between the clubs. This has since been denied by McMaster himself, who said that Johnston had jumped on his chest and that this had caused him some difficulty in breathing, but he had not needed resuscitation. He won another Scottish Cup winner's medal in 1981, although he only played in the first match and not the victorious replay. Johnston made 404 appearances in all competitions for Rangers over his spells at the club, scoring 131 goals.

He then had a spell at Hearts under another old Gers colleague, Alex MacDonald, where he was sanctioned by the SFA for apparently headbutting Celtic's David Provan and clashing with their manager Billy McNeill (a former on-field adversary), and later for commenting on the incident in a newspaper.

In 2004 Johnston was named as one of West Bromwich Albion's 16 greatest players, in a poll organised as part of the club's 125th anniversary celebrations.

== Personal life ==
Johnston was brought up in Cardenden, working as a miner after leaving school.

He now lives in Kirkcaldy. The Port Brae Bar pub in the town was run by his son Dean until a dispute with the Belhaven Brewery led to the pub being boarded up, locking Johnston's collection of memorabilia inside.

== Honours ==
Rangers

- Scottish Cup: 1965–66, 1980–81
- Scottish League Cup: 1964–65, 1970–71 (Note: Did not play in 1981–82 final)
- UEFA Cup Winners' Cup: 1971–72; runner-up: 1966–67

Vancouver Whitecaps

- 1979 NASL Soccer Bowl

== See also ==
- List of sportspeople sanctioned for doping offences
