= 1960–61 European Cup Winners' Cup =

Tournament details
- Dates: Qualifying: 1 August – 12 October 1960; Competition proper: 28 September 1960 – 27 May 1961
- Teams: Competition proper: 8 Total: 10 (from 10 associations)

Final positions
- Champions: (Italy) Fiorentina (1st title)
- Runners-up: (Scotland) Rangers

Tournament statistics
- Matches played: 18
- Goals scored: 60 (3.33 per match)
- Attendance: 431,536 (23,974 per match)
- Top scorer(s): Kurt Hamrin (Fiorentina); 5 goals

The 1960–61 season of the European Cup Winners' Cup club football tournament was won by Italian club Fiorentina in two-legged final victory against Rangers of Scotland.

Organised by the Mitropa Cup committee, this tournament's edition was recognised by UEFA in 1963, after lobbying by the Italian Football Federation. This was the first season that the tournament took place for the winners of each European country's domestic cup, and was the only one to be decided in a two-legged final. Only ten sides entered the competition, partially due to the low expectations for the new tournament among association football fans and also to the unofficial nature of this edition.

SC Dynamo Berlin was the winner of the 1959 FDGB-Pokal and should naturally have represented East Germany in the 1960–61 European Cup Winners' Cup. However, the German Football Association of the GDR (German: Deutscher Fußball-Verband der DDR) (DFV) found army-sponsored local rival and league runners-up ASK Vorwärts Berlin to be a more suitable representative of East Germany in the competition.

It is a myth that the low number of entrants was due to few countries already having a domestic cup competition: as happened for the first edition of the European Cup, entrance criteria could be changed by each national federation. Fiorentina entered as runners-up to Juventus in both Coppa Italia and Serie A, Czechoslovakia sent the winners of an unofficial League Cup, and both Hungary and East Germany enrolled their league runners-up.

== Teams ==
Austria Wien (CW)	(Czechoslovakia) Rudá Hvězda Brno (CW)	(England) Wolverhampton Wanderers (CW)	(East Germany) ASK Vorwärts Berlin (2nd)
(West Germany) Borussia Mönchengladbach (CW)	(Hungary) Ferencváros (2nd)	(Italy) Fiorentina (CR)	(Scotland) Rangers (CW)
(Switzerland) FC Lucerne (CW)	(Socialist Federal Republic of Yugoslavia) Dinamo Zagreb (CW)		

== Bracket ==
Preliminary round
(Scotland) Rangers	4	1	5
(Hungary) Ferencváros	2	2	4
(East Germany) ASK Vorwärts Berlin	2	0	2
(Czech Republic) Rudá Hvězda Brno	1	2	3

Quarter-finals
(Germany) Borussia Mönchengladbach	0	0	0
(Scotland) Rangers	3	8	11
Austria Wien	2	0	2
(England) Wolverhampton	0	5	5
(Switzerland) FC Luzern	0	2	2
(Italy) Fiorentina	3	6	9
(Czech Republic) Rudá Hvězda Brno	0	0	0
(Socialist Federal Republic of Yugoslavia) Dinamo Zagreb	0	2	2

Semi-finals
(Scotland) Rangers	2	1	3
(England) Wolverhampton	0	1	1
(Italy) Fiorentina	3	1	4
(Socialist Federal Republic of Yugoslavia) Dinamo Zagreb	0	2	2

Final
(Scotland) Rangers	0	1	1
(Italy) Fiorentina	2	2	4

== Qualifying phase ==
=== Preliminary round ===
==== Summary ====
Team 1	Agg.	Team 2	1st leg	2nd leg
ASK Vorwärts Berlin (East Germany)	2–3	(Czechoslovakia) Rudá Hvězda Brno	2–1	0–2
Rangers (Scotland)	5–4	(Hungary) Ferencváros	4–2	1–2

==== Matches ====
1 August 1960

ASK Vorwärts Berlin (East Germany)	2–1	(Czechoslovakia) Rudá Hvězda Brno
Kohle 42'; Nöldner 48'	Report	Bubník 77'

Stadion der Freundschaft, Frankfurt (Oder)
Attendance: 8,000
Referee: Fritz Seipelt (Austria)
11 August 1960

Rudá Hvězda Brno (Czechoslovakia)	2–0	(East Germany) ASK Vorwärts Berlin
Bubník 31'; Koláček 43'	Report

Stadion Za Lužánkami, Brno
Attendance: 15,000
Referee: Erich Steiner (Austria)

Rudá Hvězda Brno won 3–2 on aggregate.

28 September 1960

Rangers (Scotland)	4–2	(Hungary) Ferencváros
Davis 52'; Millar 57', 86'; Brand 73'	Report	Orosz 17'; Friedmanszky 79'

Ibrox Park, Glasgow
Attendance: 36,000
Referee: Václav Korelus (Czechoslovakia)
12 October 1960

Ferencváros (Hungary)	2–1	(Scotland) Rangers
Orosz 18'; Friedmanszky 48'	Report	Wilson 61'

Üllői úti stadion, Budapest
Attendance: 25,000
Referee: Erich Steiner (Austria)

Rangers won 5–4 on aggregate.

== Tournament phase ==
=== Quarter-finals ===
==== Summary ====
Team 1	Agg.	Team 2	1st leg	2nd leg
Rudá Hvězda Brno (Czechoslovakia)	0–2	(Socialist Federal Republic of Yugoslavia) Dinamo Zagreb	0–0	0–2
Austria Wien	2–5	(England) Wolverhampton Wanderers	2–0	0–5
Borussia Mönchengladbach (West Germany)	0–11	(Scotland) Rangers	0–3	0–8
FC Lucerne (Switzerland)	2–9	(Italy) Fiorentina	0–3	2–6

==== Matches ====
28 September 1960

Rudá Hvězda Brno (Czechoslovakia)	0–0	(Socialist Federal Republic of Yugoslavia) Dinamo Zagreb
	Report

Stadion Za Lužánkami, Brno
Attendance: 7,000
Referee: István Zsolt (Hungary)
30 November 1960

Dinamo Zagreb (Socialist Federal Republic of Yugoslavia)	2–0	(Czechoslovakia) Rudá Hvězda Brno
Matuš 10'; Jerković 15'	Report

Gradski Stadion Maksimir, Zagreb
Attendance: 11,500
Referee: Andor Dorogi (Hungary)

Dinamo Zagreb won 2–0 on aggregate.

12 October 1960

Austria Wien	2–0	(England) Wolverhampton Wanderers
Riegler 71'; Huschek 86'	Report

České-srdce-Platz, Vienna
Attendance: 20,000
Referee: Albert Dusch (West Germany)
30 November 1960

Wolverhampton Wanderers (England)	5–0	Austria Wien
Kirkham 1', 26'; Mason 35'; Broadbent 70', 72'	Report

Molineux Stadium, Wolverhampton
Attendance: 31,699
Referee: Josef Gulde (Switzerland)

Wolverhampton Wanderers won 5–2 on aggregate.

15 November 1960

Borussia Mönchengladbach (West Germany)	0–3	(Scotland) Rangers
	Report	Millar 23'; Scott 25'; McMillan 58'

Rheinstadion, Düsseldorf
Attendance: 50,000
Referee: Ezio Damiani (Yugoslavia)
30 November 1960

Rangers (Scotland)	8–0	(West Germany) Borussia Mönchengladbach
Baxter 2'; Brand 17', 44', 51'; Pfeiffer 31' (o.g.); Millar 45', 53'; Davis 65'	Report

Ibrox Park, Glasgow
Attendance: 38,174
Referee: Iginio Rigato (Italy)

Rangers won 11–0 on aggregate.

23 November 1960

FC Lucerne (Switzerland)	0–3	(Italy) Fiorentina
	Report	Petris 32'; Hamrin 35', 81'

Stadion Allmend, Lucerne
Attendance: 11,000
Referee: Kurt Tschenscher (West Germany)
28 December 1960

Fiorentina (Italy)	6–2	(Switzerland) FC Lucerne
Antoninho 28', 52', 75'; Hamrin 33' (pen.), 46'; Milan 38'	Report	Frey 43'; Hahn 55'

Stadio Comunale, Florence
Attendance: 5,000
Referee: Alojz Obtulovič (Czechoslovakia)

Fiorentina won 9–2 on aggregate.

=== Semi-finals ===
==== Summary ====
Team 1	Agg.	Team 2	1st leg	2nd leg
Fiorentina (Italy)	4–2	(Socialist Federal Republic of Yugoslavia) Dinamo Zagreb	3–0	1–2
Rangers (Scotland)	3–1	(England) Wolverhampton Wanderers	2–0	1–1

==== Matches ====
22 March 1961

Fiorentina (Italy)	3–0	(Socialist Federal Republic of Yugoslavia) Dinamo Zagreb
Antoninho 40'; da Costa 69'; Lazzotti 80'	Report

Stadio Comunale, Florence
Attendance: 5,000
Referee: Josef Kandlbinder (West Germany)
12 April 1961

Dinamo Zagreb (Socialist Federal Republic of Yugoslavia)	2–1	(Italy) Fiorentina
Matuš 15'; Haraminčić 18'	Report	Petris 50'

Gradski Stadion Maksimir, Zagreb
Attendance: 20,000
Referee: Jan Kment (Czechoslovakia)

Fiorentina won 4–2 on aggregate.

29 March 1961

Rangers (Scotland)	2–0	(England) Wolverhampton Wanderers
Scott 33'; Brand 84'	Report

Ibrox Park, Glasgow
Attendance: 80,000
Referee: Cesare Jonni (Italy)
April 19, 1961

Wolverhampton Wanderers (England)	1–1	(Scotland) Rangers
Broadbent 65'	Report	Scott 45'

Molineux Stadium, Wolverhampton
Attendance: 45,163
Referee: Gottfried Dienst (Switzerland)

Rangers won 3–1 on aggregate.

=== Final ===
==== Summary ====
Team 1	Agg.	Team 2	1st leg	2nd leg
Rangers (Scotland)	1–4	(Italy) Fiorentina	0–2	1–2

==== Matches ====
17 May 1961
19:30 (UTC)

Rangers (Scotland)	0–2	(Italy) Fiorentina
	Report	Milan 12', 88'

Ibrox Park, Glasgow
Attendance: 80,000
Referee: Erich Steiner (Austria)
27 May 1961
15:30 (CET)

Fiorentina (Italy)	2–1	(Scotland) Rangers
Milan 12'; Hamrin 86'	Report	Scott 60'

Stadio Comunale, Florence
Attendance: 27,000
Referee: Vilmos Hernádi (Hungary)

Fiorentina won 4–1 on aggregate.

== Top scorers ==
The top scorers from the 1960–61 European Cup Winners' Cup (including preliminary round) are as follows:

Rank	Name	Team	Goals
1	(Sweden) Kurt Hamrin	(Italy) Fiorentina	5
2	(Brazil) Antoninho	(Italy) Fiorentina	4
2	(Scotland) Ralph Brand	(Scotland) Rangers	4
2	(Italy) Luigi Milan	(Italy) Fiorentina	4
2	(Scotland) Alex Scott	(Scotland) Rangers	4
6	(England) Peter Broadbent	(England) Wolverhampton Wanderers	3
6	(Scotland) Jimmy Millar	(Scotland) Rangers	3

== See also ==
- 1960–61 European Cup
- 1960–61 Inter-Cities Fairs Cup
