= 1961–62 Scottish Cup =

Tournament details
- Country: Scotland

Final positions
- Champions: Rangers
- Runners-up: St Mirren

The 1961–62 Scottish Cup was the 77th staging of Scotland's most prestigious football knockout competition. The Cup was won by Rangers who defeated St Mirren in the final.

== First round ==
Home team	Score	Away team
Celtic	5 – 1	Cowdenbeath
Dunfermline Athletic	5 – 1	Forfar Athletic
East Fife	3 – 1	Gala Fairydean
Falkirk	1 – 2	Rangers
Motherwell	4 – 0	Dundee United
Partick Thistle	2 – 2	Hibernian
Aberdeen	5 – 2	Airdrieonians
Arbroath	2 – 1	Peterhead
Ayr United	3 – 4	Clyde
Berwick Rangers	2 – 6	Third Lanark
Eyemouth United	1 – 3	Montrose
Hamilton Academical	3 – 1	Elgin City
Raith Rovers	1 – 1	Queen's Park

=== Replays ===
Home team	Score	Away team
Hibernian	2 – 3	Partick Thistle
Queen's Park	1 – 4	Raith Rovers

== Second round ==
Home team	Score	Away team
Alloa Athletic	1 – 2	Raith Rovers
Brechin City	1 – 6	Kilmarnock
Clyde	2 – 2	Aberdeen
Dumbarton	2 – 3	Ross County
Dundee	0 – 1	St Mirren
Dunfermline Athletic	9 – 0	Wigtown & Bladnoch
East Fife	1 – 0	Albion Rovers
Hamilton Academical	0 – 2	Third Lanark
Inverness Caledonian	3 – 0	East Stirlingshire
Greenock Morton	1 – 3	Celtic
Motherwell	4 – 0	St Johnstone
Queen of the South	0 – 2	Stenhousemuir
Rangers	6 – 0	Arbroath
Stirling Albion	3 – 1	Partick Thistle
Stranraer	0 – 0	Montrose
Vale of Leithen	0 – 5	Hearts

=== Replays ===
Home team	Score	Away team
Aberdeen	10 – 3	Clyde
Montrose	0 – 1	Stranraer

== Third round ==
Home team	Score	Away team
Aberdeen	2 – 2	Rangers
Dunfermline Athletic	0 – 0	Stenhousemuir
Kilmarnock	7 – 0	Ross County
Raith Rovers	1 – 1	St Mirren
Stirling Albion	4 – 1	East Fife
Stranraer	1 – 3	Motherwell
Third Lanark	6 – 1	Inverness Caledonian
Hearts	3 – 4	Celtic

=== Replays ===
Home team	Score	Away team
Stenhousemuir	0 – 3	Dunfermline Athletic
Rangers	5 – 1	Aberdeen
St Mirren	4 – 0	Raith Rovers

== Quarter-finals ==
Home team	Score	Away team
Celtic	4 – 4	Third Lanark
Kilmarnock	2 – 4	Rangers
St Mirren	1 – 0	Dunfermline Athletic
Stirling Albion	0 – 6	Motherwell

=== Replays ===
Home team	Score	Away team
Third Lanark	0 – 4	Celtic

== Semi-finals ==
31 March 1962

Rangers	3–1	Motherwell

Hampden Park, Glasgow
Attendance: 84,321

31 March 1962

St Mirren	3–1	Celtic

Ibrox Stadium, Glasgow
Attendance: 59,278

== Final ==
21 April 1962

Rangers	2–0	St Mirren
Brand; Wilson	Report (Page 3)

Hampden Park, Glasgow
Attendance: 127,940
Referee: Tiny Wharton

=== Teams ===
RANGERS:
GK	(Scotland) Billy Ritchie
RB	(Scotland) Bobby Shearer
LB	(Scotland) Eric Caldow (c)
RH	(Scotland) Harold Davis
CH	(Scotland) Ronnie McKinnon
LH	(Scotland) Jim Baxter
RW	(Scotland) Willie Henderson
IR	(Scotland) Ian McMillan
CF	(Scotland) Jimmy Millar
IL	(Scotland) Ralph Brand
LW	(Scotland) Davie Wilson
Manager:
(Scotland) Scot Symon

ST MIRREN:
GK	(Scotland) Bobby Williamson
RB	(Scotland) Bobby Campbell
LB	(Scotland) John Wilson
RH	(Scotland) Rab Stewart
CH	(Scotland) Jim Clunie (c)
LH	(Scotland) George McLean
RW	(Scotland) Tommy Henderson
IR	(Scotland) Tommy Bryceland
CF	(Scotland) Don Kerrigan
IL	(Scotland) Willie Fernie
LW	(Iceland) Þór Beck
Manager:
(Scotland) Bobby Flavell

== See also ==
- 1961–62 in Scottish football
- 1961–62 Scottish League Cup
