= Davie Wilson =

Scottish footballer (1937–2022)

Personal information
- Full name: David Wilson
- Date of birth: 10 January 1937 (Note: Birth year given as 1939 in most sources.)
- Place of birth: Cambuslang, Scotland
- Date of death: 13 June 2022 (aged 85)
- Place of death: Glasgow, Scotland
- Position: Outside left

Senior career*
| Years | Team | Apps | (Gls) |
| 1954–1956 | Baillieston Juniors | | |
| 1956–1967 | Rangers | 227 | (99) |
| 1967–1972 | Dundee United | 129 | (20) |
| 1972–1973 | Dumbarton | 48 | (2) |
| Total | | 405 | (121) |

International career
| 1958 | Scotland U23 | 1 | (0) |
| 1960–1964 | Scottish League XI | 7 | (3) |
| 1960–1965 | Scotland | 22 | (10 (Note: The Scottish Football Association archive credits the 3rd Scotland goal to Wilson, and footage from the match appears to confirm this; most sources (and the contemporary commentary on the footage) credit the goal to Pat Quinn.)) |
| 1961 | SFA trial v SFL | 1 | (0) |

Managerial career
- 1974–1977: Dumbarton (assistant)
- 1977–1980: Dumbarton
- 1980–1981: Kilmarnock (assistant)
- 1984–1986: Dumbarton
- 1986–1987: Hamilton Academical (assistant)
- 1987–1989: Queen of the South
- * Club domestic league appearances and goals

David Wilson (10 January 1937 – 13 June 2022) was a Scottish international footballer who played as an outside left. He was perhaps best known for his decade at Rangers in which he played an important role in the club's success of the early 1960s; he also made over 100 appearances for Dundee United.

Wilson was also selected 22 times for the Scotland national team, and was later a manager, primarily at Dumbarton where he had ended his playing career.

== Club career ==
Wilson, a native of the mining village of Newton just outside Glasgow, was a Rangers supporter in childhood. On a visit to Ibrox Stadium he received advice from former star Alan Morton who played left wing, the position in which Wilson became established.

As a teenager he was rejected by local Junior club Cambuslang Rangers for being too small, and instead began his career at Baillieston. He soon came to the attention of Rangers who signed him in 1956.

=== Rangers ===
Wilson made his first-team debut on 2 January 1957 just prior to his 20th birthday, was selected for European matches against AS Saint-Étienne and AC Milan and played sufficient games for a League winner's medal in 1959, but it was not until the 1959–60 season that he became a regular in the side. He also began to score frequently, with 22 goals from 50 appearances in all competitions having only scored 8 in 51 in his first three seasons combined. Rangers reached the semi-finals of the European Cup and won the Scottish Cup.

The following season was even more successful, as Rangers won the Scottish Football League and the Scottish League Cup. Wilson played every minute of the campaign's 56 matches and scored over 20 goals, forming part of what would become known as one of the greatest Rangers forward lines, along with Ralph Brand, Jimmy Millar and Willie Henderson, supported by Jim Baxter. However, there was disappointment in the European Cup Winners' Cup as Fiorentina overcame Rangers in the final.

1961–62 ended with Scottish Cup and League Cup victories, and Wilson achieved a club record which has never been equalled since when he scored six times against Falkirk (a 7–1 win) 17 March 1962 (however Jimmy Smith had achieved the feat twice in the 1930s). Four days later on 21 March he scored a hat-trick for the Scottish League in a 4–3 victory against the English League at Villa Park. Around that time he declined an approach from Everton for what would have been a British record transfer fee. The next year brought a League and Cup double and Wilson hit over 30 goals, including four in one match against Partick and one in the replayed cup final against Celtic.

In 1963–64, Wilson missed a large part of the winter through injury – a broken ankle – including the League Cup Final, but returned to play in the Scottish Cup Final as Rangers completed the second treble in their history. However, in 1965 they only finished in fifth place after Baxter broke a leg, and in the League Cup Wilson was injured in the semi-final and again could not take part in the final.

Rangers regained the Scottish Cup in 1966 against Celtic but lost out in the other competitions to the same opponents, who were beginning a period of dominance. Wilson played in both cup finals but made only 21 appearances overall, his fewest since 1958. Wilson's last campaign with Rangers was 1966–67, as Willie Johnston and new signing Alex Smith became the preferred choices on the left flank. He made 29 appearances and scored eight goals, being introduced as a substitute for Johnston in the League Cup final loss to Celtic and the infamous Scottish Cup defeat to Berwick. He did not feature in Rangers' second Cup Winners' Cup Final although he played his part in the run including the winning goal in the semi-final, away to Slavia Sofia.

Wilson departed from Ibrox aged 30, having scored a total of 159 goals in 382 matches in all competitions. He was naturally right-footed, and became adept at dribbling with either foot, crossing from the byline on the left, and cutting inside to shoot powerfully with his stronger foot or connect with through balls – tactics which brought an impressive goal tally particularly for a player who was not a dedicated striker (he is ranked seventh of all post-WWII scorers for Rangers). He has since been inducted to the Rangers Hall of Fame.

=== Dundee United ===
In August 1967 Wilson transferred to Dundee United along with teammates Jimmy Millar and Wilson Wood, with Orjan Persson moving in the opposite direction. He spent four seasons at Tannadice, playing over 150 matches (129 in Division One) as the club consistently finished in the top half of the league. His time with the club coincided with that of future Rangers boss Walter Smith, whose father had worked with Wilson whilst he was apprenticed to a local steelworks in the village of Westburn, and who would later be signed by Wilson's backroom team in his time as an assistant manager. In 2017 Wilson became a member of United's Hall of Fame.

=== Dumbarton ===
Wilson moved to Dumbarton in January 1972, helped the club win promotion at the end of that season. He retired as a player at the end of the following campaign in 1973, aged 36, after helping Dumbarton maintain their status in the top division; he thereafter became a coach at the club.

== International career ==
Having appeared for the Under-23 side, Wilson made 22 full appearances for Scotland between 1960 and 1965, scoring ten goals; he was in the squad which won the 1961–62 and 1962–63 editions of the British Home Championship with perfect records. He enjoyed three wins over rivals England, including scoring in 1962 at Hampden, and playing most of the 1963 fixture at Wembley at left back after his Rangers mate Eric Caldow had his leg broken (before the days of substitutions); he had also featured and scored in Scotland's embarrassing 9–3 defeat in 1961. Wilson also represented the Scottish League XI seven times, scoring three goals.

In 2014, Wilson was inducted into the Scottish Football Hall of Fame, which he described as his "greatest honour".

== Managerial career ==
Having served as assistant manager to Alex Wright at Dumbarton – during which time the Sons reached the semi-final stage of the 1975–76 Scottish Cup – Wilson had two spells as manager of the Boghead Park club (1976–1978 and 1984–1986), developing players such as Murdo MacLeod, Graeme Sharp and Graeme Sinclair in his first stint and taking the side into the Premier Division in his second, widely regarded as a commendable achievement for a part-time club.

After a short period as assistant to John Lambie at Hamilton Academical, during which they knocked Rangers out of the 1986–87 Scottish Cup, Wilson also had a spell as manager of Dumfries club Queen of the South, taking over after the surprise resignation of promotion winning Nobby Clark.

== Personal life ==
In retirement Wilson remained an enthusiastic supporter of Rangers, attending many matches and functions and commenting on the club's struggles. He was also an after-dinner speaker. In his spare time he kept racing pigeons, and was a lifelong teetotaler and non-smoker.

Davie was a family man who loved his family dearly; his wife Avril, daughter Sheena, son David and his beloved grandchildren Carly, Harry, Anna, David and latterly Billy.

An authorised biography, Wilson on the Wing, was published in 2020.

He died on 13 June 2022, aged 85, released to press on 14 June.

== Career statistics ==
Scores and results list Scotland's goal tally first, score column indicates score after each Wilson goal.

List of international goals scored by Davie Wilson
| No. | Date | Venue | Opponent | Score | Result | Competition |
|---|---|---|---|---|---|---|
| 1 | 15 April 1961 | Wembley Stadium, London, England | England | 2–3 | 3–9 | 1961 British Home Championship |
| 2 | 15 April 1961 | Wembley Stadium, London, England | England | 3–5 | 3–9 | 1961 British Home Championship |
| 3 | 7 October 1961 | Windsor Park, Belfast, Northern Ireland | Northern Ireland | 1–0 | 6–1 | 1962 British Home Championship |
| 4 | 14 April 1962 | Hampden Park, Glasgow, Scotland | England | 1–0 | 2–0 | 1962 British Home Championship |
| 5 | 8 May 1963 | Hampden Park, Glasgow, Scotland | Austria | 1–0 | 4–1 | Friendly |
| 6 | 8 May 1963 | Hampden Park, Glasgow, Scotland | Austria | 2–0 | 4–1 | Friendly |
| 7 | 13 June 1963 | Bernabeu, Madrid, Spain | Spain | 4–1 | 6–2 | Friendly |
| 8 | 25 November 1964 | Hampden Park, Glasgow, Scotland | Northern Ireland | 1–1 | 3–2 | 1965 British Home Championship |
| 9 | 25 November 1964 | Hampden Park, Glasgow, Scotland | Northern Ireland | 3–2 | 3–2 | 1965 British Home Championship |
| 10 | 27 May 1965 | Olympiastadion, Helsinki, Finland | Finland | 1–1 | 2–1 | 1966 FIFA World Cup qualification |

== Honours ==
=== As player ===
Rangers

- Scottish League Championship: 1958–59, 1960–61, 1962–63, 1963–64
- Scottish Cup: 1959–60, 1961–62, 1962–63, 1963–64, 1965–66
- Scottish League Cup: 1960–61, 1961–62 (Note: Did not play in 1963–64 or 1964–65 League Cup finals.)
- UEFA Cup Winners' Cup: runner-up 1960–61 (Note: Did not play in 1967 European Cup Winners' Cup Final.)

Scotland

- British Home Championship: 1961–62, 1962–63, 1963–64 (shared)

=== As manager ===
Dumbarton

- Scottish First Division promotion: 1983–84
- Stirlingshire Cup: 1985–86
