= Harold Davis (footballer) =

Scottish footballer

Personal information
- Date of birth: 10 May 1933
- Place of birth: Cupar, Scotland
- Date of death: 26 June 2018 (aged 85)
- Place of death: Gairloch, Scotland
- Position: Right half

Senior career*
Years	Team	Apps	(Gls)
1949–1950	Newburgh		
1950–1956	East Fife	2	(0)
1956–1964	Rangers	168	(8)
1964–1965	Partick Thistle	22	(0)
Total		192	(8)

Managerial career
- 1965–1968: Queen's Park
- 1970–1971: Queen of the South
- * Club domestic league appearances and goals

Harold Davis (10 May 1933 – 26 June 2018) was a Scottish professional footballer, who was best known for his time with Rangers.

== Player ==
Born in Fife, Davis and his family moved to Perth after his father was injured during World War II. He began his senior football career at Scot Symon's East Fife and quickly gained praise as a tough tackling, no-nonsense defender, but was drafted for national service in 1951 and shunned easier alternative postings to join the Black Watch. Whilst in the army he fought in the Korean War and was seriously injured on the battlefield; he spent two years in hospitals recuperating from bullet wounds to his abdomen and foot.

While recovering from his injuries, Davis was determined not just to live a 'normal' life but to be extremely fit and overcome any challenge, the first being the medical opinion that he would no longer be able to play professional football. His progress impressed David Kinnear, a physiotherapist at the facility who had once played for Rangers, now managed by Scot Symon, and as a result of the mutual connections Davis signed for the reigning Scottish league champions at the age of 22. He helped them retain their title in his first campaign at Ibrox.

That was the first of seven winner's medals he would claim during eight years at the Glasgow club, making 272 appearances in all competitions and also taking part in a continental final when Rangers lost out to Fiorentina in the 1961 European Cup Winners' Cup Final. He missed out on the 1960 Scottish Cup Final after being injured by a heavy challenge in the semi-final victory over Celtic.

He then spent a season with Partick Thistle before retiring.

== Coaching career ==
Immediately after his playing days ended, Davis had a three-year spell as manager of Queen's Park in Scotland's second tier. He then returned to Rangers as a coach working with Davie White, followed a year as manager of Queen of the South and a stint coaching at Dundee (again under White, during which they won the 1973 Scottish League Cup Final) before leaving football to run a hotel in Wester Ross where he was able to continue a passion for fishing. In 1998, he survived a broken neck sustained in a road accident.

== Honours ==
Rangers

- Scottish League (4): 1956–57, 1958–59, 1960–61, 1962–63
- Scottish Cup: 1961–62
- Scottish League Cup (2): 1960–61, 1961–62
- European Cup Winners' Cup: Runner-up 1960–61
