= Ralph Brand =

Scottish footballer (1936–2026)

Personal information
- Full name: Ralph Laidlaw Brand
- Date of birth: 8 December 1936
- Place of birth: Edinburgh, Scotland
- Date of death: 17 November 2026 (aged 89)
- Position: Forward

Youth career
- Carrick Knowe
- 1952–1954: Rangers
- 1952–1953: → Slateford Athletic (loan)
- 1953–1954: → Broxburn Athletic (loan)

Senior career*
Years	Team	Apps	(Gls)
1954–1965	Rangers	206	(127)
1965–1967	Manchester City	20	(2)
1967–1968	Sunderland	31	(7)
1969–1970	Raith Rovers	23	(5)
1971–1972	Hamilton Academical	7	(2)
Total		287	(143)

International career
1958	Scotland under-23	1	(0)
1960–1962	Scotland	8	(8)
1961	SFA trial v SFL	1	(1)
1961–1963	Scottish League XI	5	(8)

Managerial career
- 1972–1973: Darlington
- 1973–1974: Albion Rovers
- * Club domestic league appearances and goals

Ralph Laidlaw Brand (8 December 1936 – 17 November 2026) was a Scottish professional footballer who played as a forward for Rangers. He later played for Manchester City, Sunderland, Raith Rovers and Hamilton Academical.

== Club career ==
Born and raised in Edinburgh, Brand had family connections to Glasgow as his uncle resided in Springburn. Brand's uncle was a Rangers supporter, and worked in the Govan shipyards. He signed for Rangers in 1952, after impressing manager Bill Struth, whilst playing in a schoolboy international against England at Wembley; Struth signed him on a provisional contract in the summer of that year.

Having spent time on loan with juvenile side Slateford Athletic and Junior team Broxburn Athletic, in 1954, months he turned professional and made his debut for Rangers on 6 November against Kilmarnock, scoring two goals in a 6–0 win. He missed the next two seasons doing his national service. After his return in December 1957, Scot Symon had become the manager and Brand formed an effective strike partnership with fellow Edinburgh native Jimmy Millar, and scored 14 goals in 28 games over the course of the second half of the season.

Having been joined on the left wing by Davie Wilson, his best season came in 1960–61, in which he played in all of Rangers' 34 league games, scoring 24 goals, and 44 in all competitions. These included five goals in Rangers' run to the final of the Cup Winners Cup, three of which were scored in an 8–0 victory over Borussia Mönchengladbach.

Brand played in four Scottish championship winning sides: 1958–59, 1960–61, 1962–63 and the Treble winning side of 1963–64. He won four League Cup and three Scottish Cup winner's medals, the latter set achieved in consecutive years in which he was a scorer in every final (plus a goal in the Old Firm replay of 1963), the only player to have achieved that feat. He played in a total of seven finals for the club, scoring six goals and never finishing on the losing side. In his time at Rangers he played 317 times and scored 206 goals, and is the club's third top post-war scorer behind Ally McCoist and Derek Johnstone.

He played his last match for Rangers on 23 April 1965 when he scored the only goal in a 1–0 win over Third Lanark in the final League game of the season. Brand was sold to Manchester City in August that year for £30,000. Two years later he moved to Sunderland before returning to Scottish football at Raith Rovers (managed by his friend Jimmy Millar). He retired in 1970, although he would come out of retirement to play a handful of matches for Hamilton Academical in 1971–72.

== International career ==
Brand played for Scotland eight times, scoring eight goals, although his international opportunities were limited because Denis Law was the established striker in the side. He also played five times for the Scottish League XI, scoring eight times including four in one match against the Irish League in October 1961.

== Managerial career ==
Brand had a brief managerial career, taking charge of Darlington for 6 months from December 1972, then Albion Rovers between 1973 and 1974. After leaving the football business he worked as a taxi-driver.

== Personal life and death ==
Brand's son, Ralph Brand Jr., played a number of games for Rangers' reserve team in the 1970s.

Brand died on 17 November 2026, aged 89.

== Playing statistics ==
Scores and results list Scotland's goal tally first, score column indicates score after each Brand goal.

List of international goals scored by Ralph Brand
No.	Date	Venue	Opponent	Score	Result	Competition
1	9 November 1960	Hampden Park, Glasgow, Scotland	Northern Ireland	4–2	5–2	1961 British Home Championship
2	9 November 1960	Hampden Park, Glasgow, Scotland	Northern Ireland	5–2	5–2	1961 British Home Championship
3	3 May 1961	Hampden Park, Glasgow, Scotland	Republic of Ireland	1–0	4–1	1962 FIFA World Cup qualification
4	3 May 1961	Hampden Park, Glasgow, Scotland	Republic of Ireland	2–0	4–1	1962 FIFA World Cup qualification
5	7 May 1961	Dalymount Park, Dublin, Republic of Ireland	Republic of Ireland	3–0	3–0	1962 FIFA World Cup qualification
6	7 October 1961	Windsor Park, Belfast, Northern Ireland	Northern Ireland	3–1	6–1	1962 British Home Championship
7	7 October 1961	Windsor Park, Belfast, Northern Ireland	Northern Ireland	5–1	6–1	1962 British Home Championship
8	2 May 1962	Hampden Park, Glasgow, Scotland	Uruguay	2–3	2–3	Friendly

== Honours ==
=== As a player ===
Rangers

- UEFA Cup Winners' Cup runner-up: 1960–61
- Scottish League First Division: 1958–59, 1960–61, 1962–63, 1963–64
- Scottish Cup: 1961–62, 1962–63, 1963–64
- Scottish League Cup: 1960–61, 1961–62, 1963–64, 1964–65

Manchester City

- Football League Second Division: 1965–66
