= 1965–66 Scottish Cup =

Tournament details
- Country: Scotland

Final positions
- Champions: Rangers
- Runners-up: Celtic

The 1965–66 Scottish Cup was the 81st staging of Scotland's most prestigious football knockout competition. The Cup was won by Rangers who defeated Celtic in the replayed final.

== Preliminary round 1 ==
Home team	Score	Away team
Berwick Rangers	1 – 0	Stenhousemuir
Dumbarton	2 – 2	Peebles Rovers
Forfar Athletic	1 – 1	Brechin City
Gala Fairydean	6 – 1	Selkirk
Raith Rovers	1 – 0	Inverness Caledonian

=== Replays ===
Home team	Score	Away team
Brechin City	1 – 3	Forfar Athletic
Peebles Rovers	2 – 3	Dumbarton

== Preliminary round 2 ==
Home team	Score	Away team
Arbroath	2 – 2	Cowdenbeath
Ayr United	1 – 0	Fraserburgh
Berwick Rangers	0 – 0	Albion Rovers
East Fife	1 – 0	Elgin City
Gala Fairydean	4 – 5	Montrose
Glasgow University	1 – 2	Dumbarton
Raith Rovers	0 – 1	Alloa Athletic
Ross County	4 – 3	Forfar Athletic

=== Replays ===
Home team	Score	Away team
Albion Rovers	3 – 0	Berwick Rangers
Cowdenbeath	1 – 1	Arbroath

==== Second Replays ====
Home team	Score	Away team
Arbroath	2 – 3	Cowdenbeath

== First round ==
Home team	Score	Away team
Alloa Athletic	3 – 5	Ross County
Falkirk	1 – 2	Dundee United
Cowdenbeath	1 – 0	St Mirren
Dumbarton	2 – 1	Montrose
Dundee	9-1	East Fife
East Stirlingshire	0 – 0	Motherwell
Hearts	2 – 1	Clyde
Dundee United	0 – 0	Falkirk
Ayr United	1 – 1	St Johnstone
Celtic	4 – 0	Stranraer
Dunfermline Athletic	3 – 1	Partick Thistle
Hamilton Academical	1 – 3	Aberdeen
Hibernian	4 – 3	Third Lanark
Greenock Morton	1 – 1	Kilmarnock
Queen of the South	3 – 0	Albion Rovers
Rangers	5 – 1	Airdrieonians
Stirling Albion	3 – 1	Queen's Park

=== Replays ===
Home team	Score	Away team
Motherwell	4 – 1	East Stirlingshire
St Johnstone	1 – 0	Ayr United
Kilmarnock	3 – 0	Greenock Morton

== Second round ==
Home team	Score	Away team
Cowdenbeath	3 – 3	St Johnstone
Ross County	0 – 2	Rangers
Aberdeen	5 – 0	Dundee United
Dumbarton	1 – 0	Queen of the South
Dundee	0 – 2	Celtic
Stirling Albion	0 – 0	Dunfermline Athletic
Hearts	2 – 1	Hibernian
Kilmarnock	5 – 0	Motherwell

=== Replays ===
Home team	Score	Away team
St Johnstone	3 – 0	Cowdenbeath
Dunfermline Athletic	4 – 1	Stirling Albion

== Quarter-finals ==
Home team	Score	Away team
Dumbarton	0 – 3	Aberdeen
Dunfermline Athletic	2 – 1	Kilmarnock
Hearts	3 – 3	Celtic
Rangers	1 – 0	St Johnstone

=== Replays ===
Home team	Score	Away team
Celtic	3 – 1	Hearts

== Semi-finals ==
26 March 1966

Aberdeen	0 – 0	Rangers

Hampden Park, Glasgow
Attendance: 49,360
Referee: JW Paterson

26 March 1966

Celtic	2 – 0	Dunfermline Athletic

Ibrox Stadium, Glasgow
Attendance: 53,900

=== Replay ===
29 March 1966

Aberdeen	1 – 2	Rangers
Harry Melrose 38'		Forrest 8'; George McLean 80'

Hampden Park, Glasgow
Attendance: 40,852
Referee: JW Paterson

== Final ==
23 April 1966

Rangers	0 – 0	Celtic

Hampden Park, Glasgow
Attendance: 126,552
Referee: Tiny Wharton

=== Teams ===
RANGERS:
GK	(Scotland) Billy Ritchie
RB	(Denmark) Kai Johansen
LB	(Scotland) David Provan
RH	(Scotland) John Greig (c)
CH	(Scotland) Ronnie McKinnon
LH	(Scotland) Bobby Watson
RW	(Scotland) Willie Henderson
IR	(Scotland) Jimmy Millar
CF	(Scotland) Jim Forrest
IL	(Scotland) Willie Johnston
LW	(Scotland) Davie Wilson
Manager:
(Scotland) Scot Symon

CELTIC:
GK	(Scotland) Ronnie Simpson
RB	(Scotland) Ian Young
LB	(Scotland) Tommy Gemmell
RH	(Scotland) Bobby Murdoch
CH	(Scotland) Billy McNeill (c)
LH	(Scotland) John Clark
RW	(Scotland) Jimmy Johnstone
IR	(Scotland) Joe McBride
CF	(Scotland) Stevie Chalmers
IL	(Republic of Ireland) Charlie Gallagher
LW	(Scotland) John Hughes
Manager:
(Scotland) Jock Stein

=== Replay ===
27 April 1966

Rangers	1 – 0	Celtic
Kai Johansen

Hampden Park, Glasgow
Attendance: 98,202
Referee: Tiny Wharton

==== Teams ====
RANGERS:
GK	(Scotland) Billy Ritchie
RB	(Denmark) Kai Johansen
LB	(Scotland) David Provan
RH	(Scotland) John Greig
CH	(Scotland) Ronnie McKinnon (c)
LH	(Scotland) Bobby Watson
RW	(Scotland) Willie Henderson
IR	(Scotland) George McLean
CF	(Scotland) Jimmy Millar
IL	(Scotland) Willie Johnston
LW	(Scotland) Davie Wilson
Manager:
(Scotland) Scot Symon

CELTIC:
GK	(Scotland) Ronnie Simpson
RB	(Scotland) Jim Craig
LB	(Scotland) Tommy Gemmell
RH	(Scotland) Bobby Murdoch
CH	(Scotland) Billy McNeill (c)
LH	(Scotland) John Clark
RW	(Scotland) Jimmy Johnstone
IR	(Scotland) Joe McBride
CF	(Scotland) Stevie Chalmers
IL	(Scotland) Bertie Auld
LW	(Scotland) John Hughes
Manager:
(Scotland) Jock Stein

== See also ==
- 1965–66 in Scottish football
- 1965–66 Scottish League Cup
