= Jim Kennedy (footballer, born 1934) =

Scottish footballer

Personal information
- Full name: James Kennedy
- Date of birth: 31 January 1934
- Place of birth: Johnstone, Scotland
- Date of death: 2 December 2003 (aged 69)
- Place of death: Johnstone, Scotland
- Position: Left-back

Youth career
- Duntocher Hibs

Senior career*
Years	Team	Apps	(Gls)
1955–1965	Celtic	170	(0)
1965–1968	Morton	41	(0)

International career
1961–1964	Scottish League XI	4	(0)
1962	SFL trial v SFA	1	(0)
1963–1964	Scotland	6	(0)
- * Club domestic league appearances and goals

James Kennedy (31 January 1934 – 2 December 2003) was a Scottish footballer who played mainly as a left-back for Celtic, Greenock Morton and Scotland.

His career with Celtic spanned a period of underachievement for the club, whereby a talented group of individuals did not function effectively enough as a team to win trophies. Nonetheless Kennedy – who featured on the losing side in the 1963 Scottish Cup Final and the 1964 Scottish League Cup Final, having been afflicted with appendicitis prior to the replay of the 1961 Scottish Cup Final which Celtic also eventually lost – was latterly recognised by the national team, although by the time he gained his six caps for Scotland (aged 30/31) playing in the left back role he occupied for most of his time, he had been displaced from that position at Celtic by the young Tommy Gemmell and was instead being selected at left half.
