= 1963–64 Scottish Cup =

Tournament details
- Country: Scotland
- Teams: 45

Final positions
- Champions: Rangers
- Runners-up: Dundee

Tournament statistics
- Matches played: 53
- Goals scored: 223 (4.21 per match)

The 1963–64 Scottish Cup was the 79th staging of Scotland's most prestigious football knockout competition. The Cup was won by Rangers who defeated Dundee in the final.

== First round ==
Home team	Score	Away team
Aberdeen	5 – 2	Hibernian
Ayr United	3 – 2	Inverness Thistle
Berwick Rangers	5 – 2	St Cuthbert Wanderers
Celtic	3 – 0	Eyemouth United
Dumbarton	4 – 0	Raith Rovers
Dundee United	0 – 0	St Mirren
Forres Mechanics	3 – 6	Dundee
Kilmarnock	2 – 1	Gala Fairydean
Montrose	1 – 1	Alloa Athletic
Greenock Morton	0 – 0	Cowdenbeath
Stenhousemuir	1 – 5	Rangers
Stirling Albion	1 – 1	Brechin City
Stranraer	2 – 1	Third Lanark

=== Replays ===
Home team	Score	Away team
Brechin City	5 – 1	Stirling Albion
Cowdenbeath	1 – 4	Greenock Morton
St Mirren	2 – 1	Dundee United
Alloa Athletic	3 – 2	Montrose

== Second round ==
Home team	Score	Away team
Aberdeen	1 – 1	Queen's Park
Albion Rovers	4 – 3	Arbroath
Alloa Athletic	1 – 3	Airdrieonians
Brechin City	2 – 9	Dundee
Buckie Thistle	1 – 3	Ayr United
Clyde	2 – 2	Forfar Athletic
Dunfermline Athletic	7 – 0	Fraserburgh
East Fife	0 – 1	East Stirlingshire
Falkirk	2 – 2	Berwick Rangers
Hamilton Academical	1 – 3	Kilmarnock
Greenock Morton	1 – 3	Celtic
Motherwell	4 – 1	Dumbarton
Partick Thistle	2 – 0	St Johnstone
Queen of the South	0 – 3	Hearts
Rangers	9 – 0	Duns
St Mirren	2 – 0	Stranraer

=== Replays ===
Home team	Score	Away team
Berwick Rangers	1 – 5	Falkirk
Forfar Athletic	3 – 2	Clyde
Queen's Park	1 – 2	Aberdeen

== Third round ==
Home team	Score	Away team
Aberdeen	1 – 2	Ayr United
Celtic	4 – 1	Airdrieonians
Dundee	6 – 1	Forfar Athletic
East Stirlingshire	1 – 6	Dunfermline Athletic
Kilmarnock	2 – 0	Albion Rovers
Motherwell	3 – 3	Hearts
Rangers	3 – 0	Partick Thistle
St Mirren	0 – 1	Falkirk

=== Replays ===
Home team	Score	Away team
Hearts	1 – 2	Motherwell

== Quarter-finals ==
Home team	Score	Away team
Dundee	1 – 1	Motherwell
Dunfermline Athletic	7 – 0	Ayr United
Falkirk	1 – 2	Kilmarnock
Rangers	2 – 0	Celtic

=== Replays ===
Home team	Score	Away team
Motherwell	2 – 4	Dundee

== Semi-finals ==
28 March 1964

Dundee	4–0	Kilmarnock

Ibrox Stadium, Glasgow
Attendance: 32,664

28 March 1964

Rangers	1–0	Dunfermline Athletic

Hampden Park, Glasgow
Attendance: 67,823

== Final ==
25 April 1964

Rangers	3–1	Dundee
Millar, Brand		Cameron

Hampden Park, Glasgow
Attendance: 120,982
Referee: Hugh Philips

=== Teams ===
RANGERS:
GK	(Scotland) Billy Ritchie
RB	(Scotland) Bobby Shearer (c)
LB	(Scotland) David Provan
RH	(Scotland) John Greig
CH	(Scotland) Ronnie McKinnon
LH	(Scotland) Jim Baxter
RW	(Scotland) Willie Henderson
IR	(Scotland) George McLean
CF	(Scotland) Jimmy Millar
IL	(Scotland) Ralph Brand
LW	(Scotland) Davie Wilson
Manager:
(Scotland) Scot Symon

DUNDEE:
GK	(Scotland) Bert Slater
RB	(Scotland) Alex Hamilton
LB	(Scotland) Bobby Cox
RH	(Scotland) Bobby Seith (c)
CH	(Scotland) George Ryden
LH	(Scotland) Alex Stuart
RW	(Scotland) Andy Penman
IR	(Scotland) Alan Cousin
CF	(Scotland) Kenny Cameron
IL	(Scotland) Alan Gilzean
LW	(Scotland) Hugh Robertson
Manager:
(Scotland) Bob Shankly

== See also ==
- 1963–64 in Scottish football
- 1963–64 Scottish League Cup
