= Bobby Williamson (footballer, born 1933) =

Scottish footballer

Personal information
- Full name: Robert Williamson
- Date of birth: 6 December 1933
- Place of birth: Edinburgh, Scotland
- Date of death: 22 August 1990 (aged 56)
- Place of death: Old Kilpatrick, Dunbartonshire, Scotland
- Position: Goalkeeper

Youth career
- Rosewell Rosedale

Senior career*
Years	Team	Apps	(Gls)
1954	Stenhousemuir (trial)	1	(0)
1954–1961	Arbroath	188	(0)
1961–1963	St Mirren	43	(0)
1963–1965	Barnsley	46	(0)
1965–1966	Leeds United	0	(0)
1966–1968	Rochdale	36	(0)
- Chorley
Total		314	(0)
- * Club domestic league appearances and goals

Bobby Williamson (6 December 1933 – 22 August 1990) was a Scottish footballer, who played for Stenhousemuir, Arbroath, St Mirren, Barnsley, Leeds United, Rochdale and Chorley.
