= Don Kerrigan =

Scottish footballer

Personal information
- Full name: Donald McDonald Kerrigan
- Date of birth: 7 May 1941
- Place of birth: West Kilbride, Scotland
- Date of death: 29 November 1990 (aged 49)
- Place of death: Glasgow, Scotland
- Position: Right winger

Youth career
- Drumchapel Amateurs

Senior career*
Years	Team	Apps	(Gls)
1958–1963	St Mirren	80	(33)
1963–1965	Aberdeen	52	(26)
1965–1967	Heart of Midlothian	36	(10)
1965–1967	Dunfermline Athletic	12	(0)
1967–1969	Fulham	6	(1)
1969	→ Lincoln City (loan)	12	(0)
- Portadown
Total		198	(70)
- * Club domestic league appearances and goals

Don Kerrigan (7 May 1941 – 29 November 1990) was a Scottish professional footballer, who played for St Mirren, Aberdeen, Heart of Midlothian, Dunfermline Athletic, Fulham, Lincoln City and Portadown.
