= Billy Price (footballer, born 1934) =

Scottish footballer

Personal information
- Full name: William Price
- Date of birth: 5 October 1934
- Place of birth: Tarbolton, Scotland
- Date of death: 2004 (aged 69–70)
- Position: Left half

Youth career
- Annbank United

Senior career*
Years	Team	Apps	(Gls)
1954–1958	Airdrieonians	108	(26)
1958–1961	Falkirk	29	(4)
1961–1964	Celtic	74	(3)
1964–1965	Berwick Rangers	24	(4)
Total		212	(37)

International career
1956–1957	Scotland U23	2	(0)
- * Club domestic league appearances and goals

William Price (born 5 October 1934 in Tarbolton; died 2004) was a footballer who played as a left half for Annbank United, Airdrie, Falkirk, Celtic and Berwick Rangers. He lived most of his life in the town of Ayr near Tarbolton.

Celtic purchased Billy from Falkirk for £1000 in July 1961. He played for Celtic in the 1963 Scottish Cup Final against Rangers, and he played 51 league matches for the club. He ended his career at Berwick Rangers after being released at the end of the 1964–1965 season. He is one of a handful of Scottish footballers that have scored three penalties in one match; he achieved this feat in a game between Falkirk and Hamilton.
