= Jim Baxter =

Scottish footballer (1939-2001)

- Baxter during his time at Nottingham Forest

Personal information
- Full name: James Curran Baxter
- Date of birth: 29 September 1939
- Place of birth: Hill of Beath, Fife, Scotland
- Date of death: 14 April 2001 (aged 61)
- Place of death: Glasgow, Scotland
- Position: Left-half

Youth career
- Halbeath Juveniles

Senior career*
Years	Team	Apps	(Gls)
- Crossgates Primrose
1957–1960	Raith Rovers	62	(3)
1960–1965	Rangers	136	(18)
1965–1967	Sunderland	87	(10)
1967	→ Vancouver Royal Canadians (loan)	12	(2)
1967–1969	Nottingham Forest	48	(3)
1969–1970	Rangers	14	(1)
Total		359	(37)

International career
1958	Scotland Under-23	1	(0)
1960	SFL trial v SFA	1	(0)
1960–1967	Scotland	34	(3)
1961–1964	SFA trial v SFL	2	(0)
1961–1964	Scottish League XI	5	(0)
- * Club domestic league appearances and goals

James Curran Baxter (29 September 1939 – 14 April 2001) was a Scottish professional footballer who played as a left half. He is generally regarded as one of the country's greatest ever players. He was born, educated and started his career in Fife, but his peak playing years were in the early 1960s with the Glasgow club Rangers, whom he helped to win ten trophies between 1960 and 1965, and where he became known as "Slim Jim". However, he started drinking heavily during a four-month layoff caused by a leg fracture in December 1964, his fitness suffered, and he was transferred to Sunderland in summer 1965. In two and a half years at Sunderland he played 98 games and scored 12 goals, becoming known for drinking himself unconscious the night before a match and playing well the next day. At the end of 1967 Sunderland transferred him to Nottingham Forest, who gave him a free transfer back to Rangers in 1969 after 50 games. After a further year with Rangers Baxter retired from football in 1970, at the age of 31.

From 1960 to 1967, he was a leading member of a strong Scottish international team that lost only once to England, in 1966, shortly after he recovered from the leg fracture. He thought his best international performance was a 2–1 win against England in 1963, when he scored both goals after Scotland were reduced to 10 players. In the 1967 match against England, who had won the 1966 World Cup, he taunted the opposition by ball juggling while waiting for his teammates to find good positions. Although he was given most of the credit for the 3–2 win, some commentators wished he had made an effort to run up a bigger score.

In his prime, Baxter was known for his ability to raise a team's morale, his good tactical vision, precise passing and ability to send opponents the wrong way – and for being a joker on the pitch. He also broke with Glasgow tradition by becoming friendly with several members of their major Glasgow rivals, Celtic.

Although he gained a reputation as a womaniser when he moved to Glasgow, he married in 1965 and had two sons. The marriage broke up in 1981, and in 1983 he formed another relationship that lasted the rest of his life. After retiring from football he became manager of a pub, and his continued heavy drinking damaged his liver so badly that he needed two transplants at the age of 55, after which he swore off alcohol. Baxter was also addicted to gambling, and is estimated to have lost between £250,000 and £500,000. After he died of pancreatic cancer in 2001, his funeral was held in Glasgow Cathedral and his ashes were buried at Rangers' Ibrox Stadium. In 2003, a statue was erected in his honour at his hometown, Hill of Beath.

== Early life ==
Baxter was born in Hill of Beath, Fife, on 29 September 1939 and was educated and started his career there. After leaving school he spent eight months as an apprentice cabinet maker, and then worked as a coal miner.

His former headmaster James Carmichael took an interest in ex-pupils and encouraged Baxter to join local football team Halbeath Juveniles instead of one of the glamour clubs. Baxter went on to play for the Fife junior team, Crossgates Primrose. He undertook National Service with the Black Watch from 1961 to 1963.

== Club career ==
=== Raith Rovers ===
Baxter joined Raith Rovers as a part-timer in 1957. In his time at the Kirkcaldy club he orchestrated a 3–2 win over Rangers at Ibrox Park; Scot Symon decided he wanted to sign him for Rangers from that performance.

In an interview on his career, Baxter was asked if joining the senior ranks was the beginning of his football education. He said he found the idea of being given any sort of football education laughable, before then commenting on Willie McNaught. Describing McNaught as, 'a smashing guy', Baxter explained how instead of thoughtlessly charging forward with the ball, McNaught suggested more considered football – change from running 30 yards to produce a five-yard pass to running five yards and producing a 30-yard pass. This, Baxter then stated, was his football education with Willie McNaught the provider. He later said of his time with the two Fife clubs, "I would never have made it in today's circumstances. I needed bastards like Carmichael, Buckard, Ferrier, Herdman and McNaught. Young players like I was would simply tell them to get stuffed and take their talent elsewhere. I owe them."

=== Rangers ===
In June 1960, Baxter joined the Glasgow team Rangers for a transfer fee of £17,500, a Scottish record at the time. He played for Rangers from 1960 to 1965, mainly as an attacking left half. During this period the team won the Scottish League Championship in 1961, 1963 and 1964, and were winners of three Scottish Cups and four League Cups from as many finals, Baxter playing in all seven ties. Rangers fans remember him as "Slim Jim", and in 18 "Old Firm" games against local rivals Celtic – ten Scottish League, five League Cup and three Scottish Cup matches – he was only twice on the losing side.

His first Rangers game was in August 1960 at inside left against Partick Thistle in the Scottish League Cup. He scored his first goal for the club in November 1960, against Clyde, and in the same month scored an early goal in Rangers' 8–0 win over the German team Borussia Mönchengladbach. In 1961 Baxter played in the Rangers team that contested the first ever European Cup Winners' Cup Final, a two-legged tie that they lost 4–1 on aggregate to Fiorentina.

In December 1964, Baxter played brilliantly to set up a 2–0 win for Rangers in an away game against Rapid Vienna in the European Cup. With the game won, rather than play out time Baxter's confidence over-extended into arrogance to make fun of his opponents with the ball. In the last minute he went to 'nutmeg' an opponent, who was having none of it and broke Baxter's leg with his challenge. This was to be a watershed for Baxter. During the four months in which he was unable to play he began drinking to his detriment; this ultimately was to curtail his playing career and his life.

=== Sunderland ===
Baxter joined Sunderland for a transfer fee of £72,500, the highest ever paid to a Scottish club at the time. Baxter played 98 games for Sunderland in England's First Division (then the top tier), scoring 12 goals.

=== Nottingham Forest ===
In December 1967, English First Division club Nottingham Forest signed Baxter from Sunderland for a club record £100,000 fee, but his rapidly declining fitness and troubled personal life meant the move was unsuccessful. Nottingham Evening Post reporter Tony Pritchett described the signing of Baxter as "probably the worst transfer in Forest's history". After 49 appearances, he left Forest in May 1969 to return to Rangers.

=== Return to Rangers ===
Baxter moved back to Rangers. His return to Rangers was brief, as he retired from football in 1970, aged only 31. By the end of his career with Rangers he had made 254 appearances for the club, including victories that led to three Scottish League Championships, three Scottish Cups and four League Cups.

== International career ==
In the 1960s Baxter gained 34 caps as a member of strong Scottish teams, which included Billy McNeill, Paddy Crerand, John White, Dave Mackay, Denis Law and John Greig. In his international appearances he scored three goals, and Scotland won 21, drew 3 and lost 10 of these matches. He made his international debut in November 1960, when Scotland beat Northern Ireland. In 1961 Scotland had lost 9–3 to England at Wembley, and April 1962 Baxter and Crerand played brilliantly, helping Scotland to gain some revenge with a 2–0 win.

According to many commentators, his greatest performances were against England in 1963 and 1967. Baxter regarded his performance in 1963 as the better of the two. In the 1963 game Scotland were reduced to 10 men when their left back Eric Caldow's leg was broken in a tackle by Bobby Smith – substitutions were not allowed at that time. Baxter, supported by Mackay, White and Law, led Scotland to a 2–1 win, scoring both of the goals, the first being Baxter's first-ever penalty kick, for an English foul on Willie Henderson. Bobby Moore thought this was the best team Scotland ever fielded.

The following year Scotland, again inspired by Baxter and Law, beat England 1–0, and only poor finishing prevented them from scoring a bigger win. In 1966, sixteen months after his leg had been broken, Baxter was not able to inspire his teammates, and Scotland lost 4–3 to England.

In the 1967 British Home Championship, Baxter produced a dominating but controversial performance for Scotland, tantalising England, who had won the World Cup in 1966, by playing "keepie uppie" (ball juggling) while waiting for teammates to get into good positions. Some commentators accepted that humiliating the opposition was a valid objective, while others regarded it as childish and thought Scotland should have won a more convincing victory than the actual 3–2 scoreline. Teammate Denis Law expressed opinions on both sides of this debate, saying that Baxter was "the best player on the park" and the main reason for the Scots' victory, but complaining that Baxter's lack of urgency had prevented Scotland from thoroughly avenging the 9–3 defeat in April 1961. Alex Ferguson said Baxter's performance "could have been set to music". In this game Baxter also conspired with Billy Bremner against Alan Ball, sending Bremner a "50-50" pass, which allowed Bremner to "hit Ball like a train" when Ball contested possession. As Scotland were the first team to beat England after the 1966 FIFA World Cup, the Tartan Army proclaimed themselves "unofficial world champions".

In October 1963, which may have been Baxter's best year overall, he played for the "Rest of the world" in a match against England to celebrate the centenary of The Football Association. He came on to the field in the second half, and his performance won the admiration of Ferenc Puskás. However England won the match 2–1.

Scotland did not qualify for the final stage of the FIFA World Cup during Baxter's playing career. Scottish public opinion at the time blamed lack of commitment by the "Anglos", Scottish-born players who spent little or none of their playing careers in Scotland. However at the time beating England was more important to the Scots. In 1960–61, when Baxter played in all the qualifying matches for the 1962 World Cup, they finished first equal in their qualifying group but lost the play-off against Czechoslovakia, who were runners-up to Brazil in the Final. Four years later Baxter played in only two of the qualifying games, (however one of these games was against Italy where he made John Greig's winning goal after starting the move by taking the ball from Scotland's keeper) before breaking his leg in a club game in Vienna. Scotland finished second in their qualifying group, behind Italy. In 1968–69 he was not selected to play in any of the qualifiers for the 1970 World Cup.

== Personal life and retirement ==
After moving to Rangers, Baxter became a notorious womaniser. In his words, "One day, I was a Raith Rovers player who couldnae pull the birds at the Cowdenbeath Palais. The next day I was in Glasgow and the girls were throwing themselves at me. It was certainly a change and I wasn't letting it go by." However, in 1965 he married Jean Ferguson, a hairdresser, and the couple brought up two sons Alan and Steven. His marriage to Jean broke down in 1981 and the two divorced. Jean married golfer William McCondichie three years later. In 1983 Baxter formed a relationship with Norma Morton, and the couple remained together until his death in 2001.

Baxter was free of the sectarianism that marked the rivalry between Glasgow's two leading teams. His close friends included the Celtic players Billy McNeill, Paddy Crerand and Mike Jackson, in defiance of the unwritten rule that rivals did not associate.

Like some other British football stars of the late 20th century, Baxter drank to excess, and at one point was said to be consuming three bottles of Bacardi a day. Scotland teammate Dave Mackay unsuccessfully advised him to train harder and live more sensibly. Baxter often got falling-down drunk the night before a match, but this did not seem to hamper his play, and team managers took little notice of his drinking. After retiring from football Baxter became a pub licensee, an unsuitable career for a problem drinker. At the age of 55 he needed two liver transplants in four days, and promised to quit drinking.

His other lifelong addiction was gambling, at which he lost £500,000 by his own estimate and £250,000 by third-party estimates. Later in his life, when asked if earning the huge incomes of footballers in later decades would have made a difference, he replied, "Aye, I would have gambled £50,000 a week on the horses instead of £100."

In February 2001, Baxter was diagnosed as suffering from cancer of the pancreas, and he died at his home on Glasgow's South Side on 14 April 2001, with his partner Norma and his sons Alan and Steven at his bedside. His funeral was held in Glasgow Cathedral, where a reading was given by then-Chancellor of the Exchequer Gordon Brown, a long-time fan of Raith Rovers F.C., where Baxter began his career.

== Style of play ==
Baxter is generally regarded as one of Scotland's greatest ever players. He was noted for accurate passes, for sending opponents the wrong way with a swivel of his hips, and for inspiring teammates with his confident approach. He attracted attention by his stylish play, controlling the game with "unhurried artistry". He refused to conform with the "efficient" style that dominated British football or the energetic, physical style that was typical of Rangers at the time. Indeed, although Rangers insisted that players tuck their shirts completely into their shorts, Baxter always let part of his dangle over his left hip. He described his approach to playing football as "treating the ball like a woman. Give it a cuddle, caress it a wee bit, take your time, and you'll get the required response".

Baxter played most of his best football in his early twenties, before the leg fracture against Rapid Vienna in December 1964 and the start of his heavy drinking that made his nickname "Slim Jim" less appropriate. He was also noted as a joker on the pitch. After the replay of the Scottish Cup Final against Celtic in 1963 he stuffed the match ball up his shirt and later gave it to a new member of the team. The SFA insisted that the ball should be returned, and Rangers sent them a ball, but possibly not the match ball. Most famously, during Scotland's 3–2 win over England in 1967, he taunted his opponents by playing "keepie uppie" during the game.

== Legacy ==
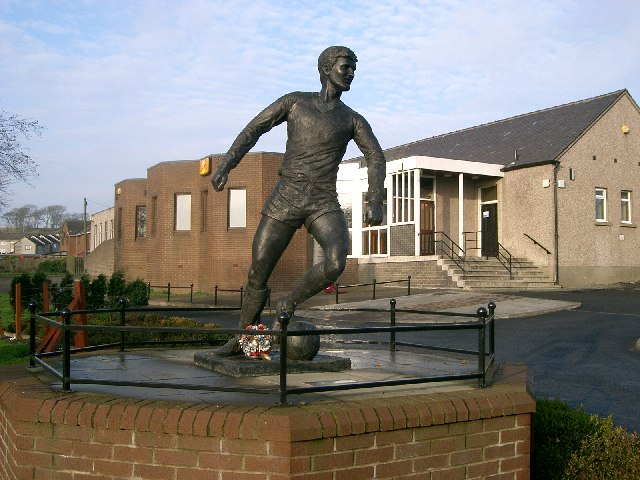
Statue in Baxter's honour in his home town, Hill of Beath in Fife – with the ball on his famous left foot

Manchester United manager Alex Ferguson described Baxter as "arguably the best player to play in Scottish football" and "the greatest player I ever played with ... He had touch, balance, vision and just this wonderful aura ..." Rangers manager Willie Waddell said, "Jim was the finest left half ever produced by Rangers." Jimmy Johnstone, who played for Rangers' great rivals Celtic, said shortly after Baxter's death, "He was a great man and a genius on the ball." Allegedly Pelé once said that Baxter should have been a Brazilian. After Baxter's performance in the 1963 "rest of the world" vs England match, Ferenc Puskás asked, "Where has this fellow been hiding?" Shortly before his own death, George Best named Baxter as one of the best eleven players he had played with or against in an interview with FourFourTwo magazine.

Baxter is a member of the Rangers supporters' Hall of Fame, and one of the first 50 added to the Scottish Sporting Hall of Fame when it was created in 2002. In 2004, he was also inducted into the Scottish Football Hall of Fame. In the December 1999 issue of World Soccer magazine he was voted by a readers' poll into a list of the 100 greatest players of the 20th century.

The Tartan Army unsuccessfully attempted to get the new Wembley Stadium footbridge named after him, and on 24 February 2005 Scottish National Party MP Pete Wishart presented an Early Day Motion in the House of Commons supporting this campaign.

In 2003, a statue of Baxter was erected in his birthplace, Hill of Beath in Fife, after a campaign that raised £80,000. Fellow footballer and midfielder Scott Brown, who would become Scotland captain in the 2010s, was also raised in the village and attended the same school, with the Baxter statue across the street from his childhood home, although Brown chose to sign for Celtic rather than Rangers.

== Career statistics ==
=== International appearances ===
Scotland national team
Year	Apps	Goals
1960	1	0
1961	7	0
1962	4	1
1963	7	2
1964	5	0
1965	3	0
1966	4	0
1967	3	0
Total	34	3

=== International goals ===
Scores and results list Scotland's goal tally first.

#	Date	Venue	Opponent	Score	Result	Competition
1.	2 May 1962	Hampden Park, Glasgow	Uruguay	1–3	2–3	Friendly
2.	6 April 1963	Wembley Stadium, London	England	1–0	2–1	1963 British Home Championship
3.	6 April 1963	Wembley Stadium, London	England	2–0	2–1	1963 British Home Championship

== Honours ==
=== Club ===
Rangers

- UEFA Cup Winners' Cup Runner-up: 1960–61
- Scottish League First Division: 1960–61, 1962–63, 1963–64
- Scottish Cup: 1961–62, 1962–63, 1963–64
- Scottish League Cup: 1960–61, 1961–62, 1963–64, 1964–65

=== Individual ===
- Scottish Football Hall of Fame (inaugural inductee)
- Scottish Sports Hall of Fame (inaugural inductee)
- Ballon d'Or: 1965 (13th place)
- World XI: 1963

== See also ==
- List of Scotland national football team captains
