= 1962–63 Scottish Cup =

Tournament details
- Country: Scotland

Final positions
- Champions: Rangers
- Runners-up: Celtic

The 1962–63 Scottish Cup was the 78th staging of Scotland's most prestigious football knockout competition. The Cup was won by Rangers who defeated Celtic in the replayed final. The first round tie between Airdrie and Stranraer is notable for having been rearranged no fewer than 33 times due to inclement weather during the winter of 1962–63 in the United Kingdom.

== First round ==
Home team	Score	Away team
Airdrieonians	3 – 0	Stranraer
St Johnstone	1 – 0	Stenhousemuir
Partick Thistle	3 – 2	Greenock Morton
Falkirk	0 – 2	Celtic
Dundee United	3 – 0	Albion Rovers
East Stirlingshire	2 – 0	Stirling Albion
Gala Fairydean	4 – 0	Keith
Arbroath	2 – 0	Dumbarton
East Fife	5 – 0	Edinburgh University
Forfar Athletic	1 – 3	Hearts
Inverness Caledonian	1 – 5	Dundee
Inverness Thistle	0 – 2	Queen of the South
Raith Rovers	2 – 0	Eyemouth United

== Second round ==
Home team	Score	Away team
Airdrieonians	0 – 6	Rangers
St Johnstone	1 – 2	Aberdeen
Cowdenbeath	2 – 3	Dunfermline Athletic
Celtic	3 – 1	Hearts
East Stirlingshire	1 – 0	Motherwell
Partick Thistle	1 – 1	Arbroath
Dundee	8 – 0	Montrose
East Fife	1 – 1	Third Lanark
Ayr United	1 – 2	Dundee United
Berwick Rangers	1 – 3	St Mirren
Brechin City	0 – 2	Hibernian
Gala Fairydean	1 – 1	Duns
Hamilton Academical	1 – 1	Nairn County
Kilmarnock	0 – 0	Queen of the South
Queen's Park	5 – 1	Alloa Athletic
Raith Rovers	3 – 2	Clyde

=== Replays ===
Home team	Score	Away team
Arbroath	2 – 2	Partick Thistle
Duns	1 – 2	Gala Fairydean
Queen of the South	1 – 0	Kilmarnock
Third Lanark	2 – 0	East Fife
Nairn County	1 – 2	Hamilton Academical

=== Second Replays ===
Home team	Score	Away team
Arbroath	2 – 3	Partick Thistle

== Third round ==
Home team	Score	Away team
Aberdeen	4 – 0	Dunfermline Athletic
Queen of the South	3 – 0	Hamilton Academical
Rangers	7 – 2	East Stirlingshire
St Mirren	1 – 1	Partick Thistle
Dundee	1 – 0	Hibernian
Celtic	6 – 0	Gala Fairydean
Third Lanark	0 – 1	Raith Rovers
Queen's Park	1 – 1	Dundee United

=== Replays ===
Home team	Score	Away team
Partick Thistle	0 – 1	St Mirren
Dundee United	3 – 1	Queen's Park

== Quarter-finals ==
Home team	Score	Away team
Dundee	1 – 1	Rangers
Raith Rovers	2 – 1	Aberdeen
St Mirren	0 – 1	Celtic
Dundee United	1 – 1	Queen of the South

=== Replays ===
Home team	Score	Away team
Queen of the South	1 – 1	Dundee United
Rangers	3 – 2	Dundee

=== Second Replays ===
Home team	Score	Away team
Dundee United	4 – 0	Queen of the South

== Semi-finals ==
13 April 1963

Celtic	5–2	Raith Rovers

Ibrox Park, Glasgow
Attendance: 35,681

13 April 1963

Rangers	5–2	Dundee United

Hampden Park, Glasgow
Attendance: 56,391

== Final ==
4 May 1963

Rangers	1–1	Celtic
Ralph Brand		Bobby Murdoch

Hampden Park, Glasgow
Attendance: 129,643
Referee: Tiny Wharton

Teams

RANGERS:
GK	(Scotland) Billy Ritchie
RB	(Scotland) Bobby Shearer (c)
LB	(Scotland) David Provan
RH	(Scotland) John Greig
CH	(Scotland) Ronnie McKinnon
LH	(Scotland) Jim Baxter
RW	(Scotland) Willie Henderson
IR	(Scotland) George McLean
CF	(Scotland) Jimmy Millar
IL	(Scotland) Ralph Brand
LW	(Scotland) Davie Wilson
Manager:
(Scotland) Scot Symon

CELTIC:
GK	(Scotland) Frank Haffey
RB	(Scotland) Duncan MacKay
LB	(Scotland) Jim Kennedy
RH	(Scotland) John McNamee
CH	(Scotland) Billy McNeill (c)
LH	(Scotland) Billy Price
RW	(Scotland) Jimmy Johnstone
IR	(Scotland) Bobby Murdoch
CF	(Scotland) John Hughes
IL	(Scotland) John Divers
LW	(Scotland) Frank Brogan
Manager:
(Scotland) Jimmy McGrory

=== Replay ===
15 May 1963

Rangers	3–0	Celtic
Ralph Brand; Davie Wilson

Hampden Park, Glasgow
Attendance: 120,273
Referee: Tiny Wharton

Teams

RANGERS:
GK	(Scotland) Billy Ritchie
RB	(Scotland) Bobby Shearer (c)
LB	(Scotland) David Provan
RH	(Scotland) John Greig
CH	(Scotland) Ronnie McKinnon
LH	(Scotland) Jim Baxter
RW	(Scotland) Willie Henderson
IR	(Scotland) Ian McMillan
CF	(Scotland) Jimmy Millar
IL	(Scotland) Ralph Brand
LW	(Scotland) Davie Wilson
Manager:
(Scotland) Scot Symon

CELTIC:
GK	(Scotland) Frank Haffey
RB	(Scotland) Duncan MacKay
LB	(Scotland) Jim Kennedy
RH	(Scotland) John McNamee
CH	(Scotland) Billy McNeill (c)
LH	(Scotland) Billy Price
RW	(Scotland) Bobby Craig
IR	(Scotland) Bobby Murdoch
CF	(Scotland) John Divers
IL	(Scotland) Stevie Chalmers
LW	(Scotland) John Hughes
Manager:
(Scotland) Jimmy McGrory

== See also ==
- 1962–63 in Scottish football
- 1962–63 Scottish League Cup
