= John Greig =

Scottish footballer (born 1942)

John Greig CBE
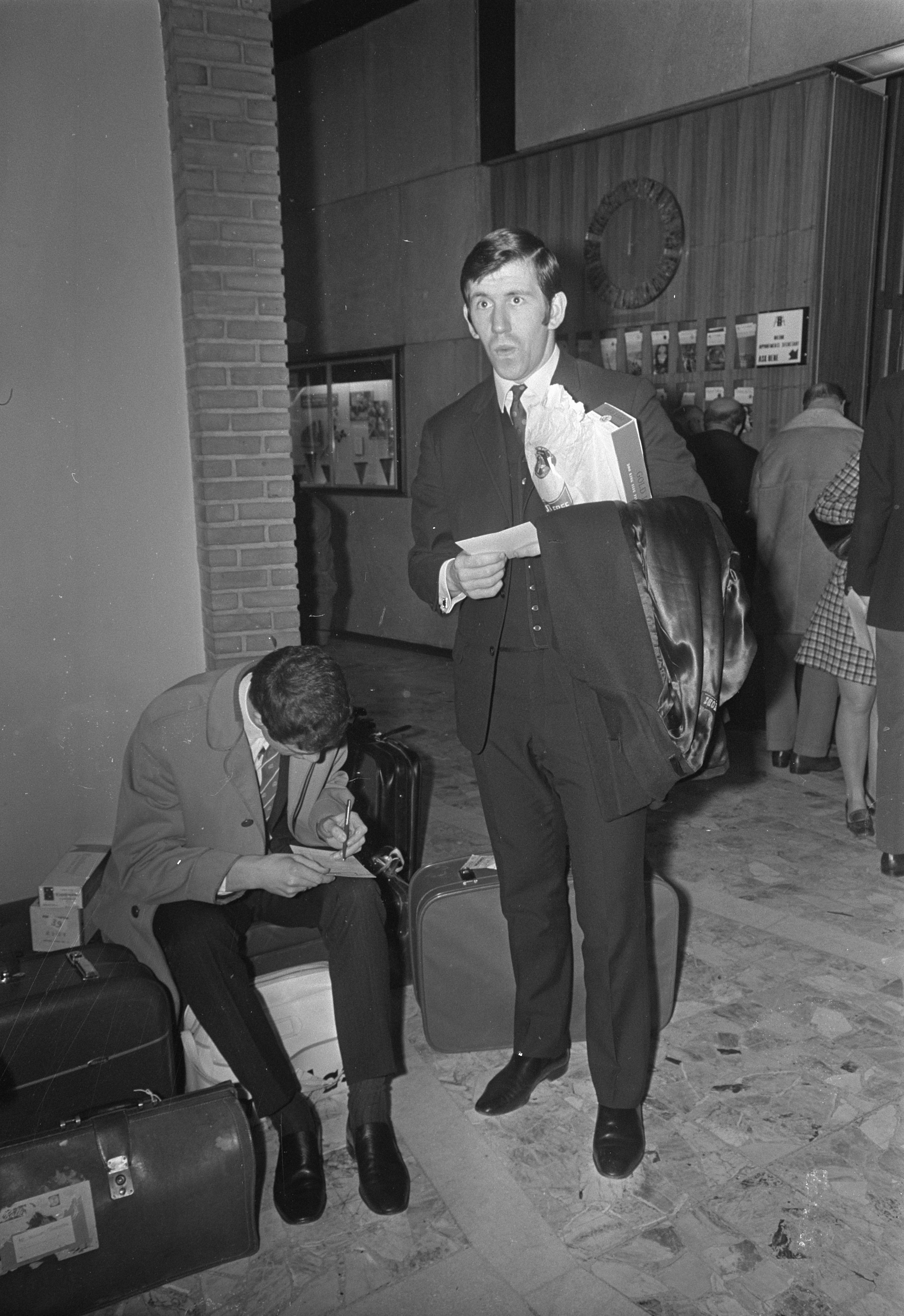
- Greig in January 1969

Personal information
- Date of birth: 11 September 1942 (age 84)
- Place of birth: Edinburgh, Scotland
- Position: Defender

Youth career
- United Crossroads
- 1959–1959: Whitburn
- 1959–1961: Rangers

Senior career*
Years	Team	Apps	(Gls)
1961–1978	Rangers	498	(87)

International career
1963–1976	Scottish League XI	14	(1)
1963–1968	Scotland U23	3	(0)
1964	SFL trial v SFA	1	(0)
1964–1975	Scotland	44	(3)

Managerial career
- 1978–1983: Rangers
- * Club domestic league appearances and goals

John Greig CBE (born 11 September 1942) is a Scottish former professional football player and manager who played as a defender. He spent his entire career with Rangers, as a player, manager and director. Greig was voted "The Greatest Ever Ranger" in 1999 by the club's supporters, and has been elected to Rangers' Hall of Fame.

== Early life ==
Greig played his youth football with United Crossroads Boys Club in Edinburgh, under the supervision of Eric Gardiner, and supported Hearts as a boy. It is unknown if Hearts showed any interest in signing him. Bob McAuley signed Greig for Rangers and despite his initial reluctance, Greig did as instructed by his father. However, after viewing a match between Rangers and Hibernian at Easter Road, where he witnessed them beating Hibs 6–1, he was convinced the move was right.

== Playing career ==
=== Club ===
As a player, recognised for his leadership qualities, Greig made 755 official appearances for Rangers (498 in the domestic league, 72 in the Scottish Cup, a club record 121 in the League Cup and 64 in European tournaments). He scored 120 goals for the club and won three domestic trebles. Greig actually started his career with Rangers as a forward, prior to being moved back to midfield — playing initially alongside Jim Baxter — and finally to left back. It was therefore in those initial years that he scored the majority of his goals for the club.

Greig was captain when Rangers won the European Cup Winners Cup in 1972 beating Dynamo Moscow 3–2 in Barcelona. Although Greig's was an enormously successful playing career, his captaincy coincided with a period of sustained success for Rangers' city rivals, Celtic, from the late 1960s until the mid-1970s. Greig's fortitude during that period further cemented his reputation as one of Rangers' most celebrated captains.

Greig was granted a testimonial match in 1978 against a Scotland XI as part of the national squad's preparations for the 1978 FIFA World Cup; Rangers won 5–0 before a crowd of 65,000 at Ibrox.

=== International ===
Greig played for Scotland on 44 occasions, 15 as captain, between 1964 and 1975. He scored the late winner in Scotland's 1–0 victory against Italy at Hampden Park on 9 November 1965 and in 1967 achieved the distinction of captaining the Scottish side who beat England 3–2 — their first defeat as World Champions — at Wembley. Greig also represented the Scottish League XI 14 times.

== Managerial career ==
Greig's playing career ended in May 1978 when he was appointed manager of Rangers, replacing Jock Wallace. The club failed to win the league championship during Greig's time as manager, finishing no higher than the second place achieved in 1978–79. Greig's team had come close to winning a domestic treble and performed well in Europe in that first season. Rangers reached the quarter-final of the 1978–79 European Cup, defeating Italian champions Juventus and becoming the first club to win in European club competition at PSV's Philips Stadion, before eventual elimination to Cologne. There was also the partial compensation of success in domestic cup competitions, with two Scottish Cups and two League Cups secured over the course of Greig's five full seasons as manager. Greig was also responsible for signing Rangers' greatest ever goalscorer Ally McCoist from Sunderland. However, these were isolated achievements, and Greig — under intense pressure from the Scottish media, Rangers supporters and the club's directors — resigned in October 1983, replaced by the returning Wallace.

== Post-football career ==
After leaving Rangers, Greig worked as a pundit for Radio Scotland and BBC television. He returned in 1990 as part of the club's public relations team. Dick Advocaat, manager of Rangers from 1998 to 2001, re-involved Greig in football coaching during which time he contributed to youth development. In 2003, he joined the Rangers board of directors. Greig resigned this position in October 2011, soon after the takeover of the club by Craig Whyte. Greig and John McClelland, who resigned at the same time as Greig, stated that they had been excluded from the corporate governance of the club since Whyte had taken control. Greig later re-joined Rangers on 23 May 2015, when he was named the club's honorary life president with ambassadorial responsibilities.

== Career statistics ==
=== Club ===
Appearances and goals by club, season and competition
Club	Season	League			Scottish Cup		League Cup		Europe		Total	
Club	Season	Division	Apps	Goals	Apps	Goals	Apps	Goals	Apps	Goals	Apps	Goals
Rangers	1961–62	Division One	11	7	1	0	2	1	1	0	15	8
Rangers	1962–63	Division One	27	5	7	0	5	5	2	0	41	10
Rangers	1963–64	Division One	34	4	6	2	10	0	2	0	52	6
Rangers	1964–65	Division One	34	4	3	0	7	0	7	1	51	5
Rangers	1965–66	Division One	32	7	7	0	10	1	0	0	49	8
Rangers	1966–67	Division One	32	2	1	0	8	1	9	0	50	3
Rangers	1967–68	Division One	32	11	4	2	6	0	6	1	48	14
Rangers	1968–69	Division One	33	6	5	1	6	0	9	2	53	9
Rangers	1969–70	Division One	30	7	3	2	6	0	4	0	43	9
Rangers	1970–71	Division One	26	8	7	0	8	1	2	1	43	10
Rangers	1971–72	Division One	28	8	6	1	6	0	8	0	48	9
Rangers	1972–73	Division One	30	7	6	0	10	3	2	0	48	10
Rangers	1973–74	Division One	32	6	1	0	10	2	4	2	47	10
Rangers	1974–75	Division One	22	1	0	0	1	0	0	0	23	1
Rangers	1975–76	Premier Division	36	2	5	0	10	1	4	0	55	3
Rangers	1976–77	Premier Division	30	0	5	0	11	1	2	0	48	1
Rangers	1977–78	Premier Division	29	2	5	1	5	1	2	1	41	5
Career total			498	87	72	9	121	17	64	7	755	120

=== International appearances ===
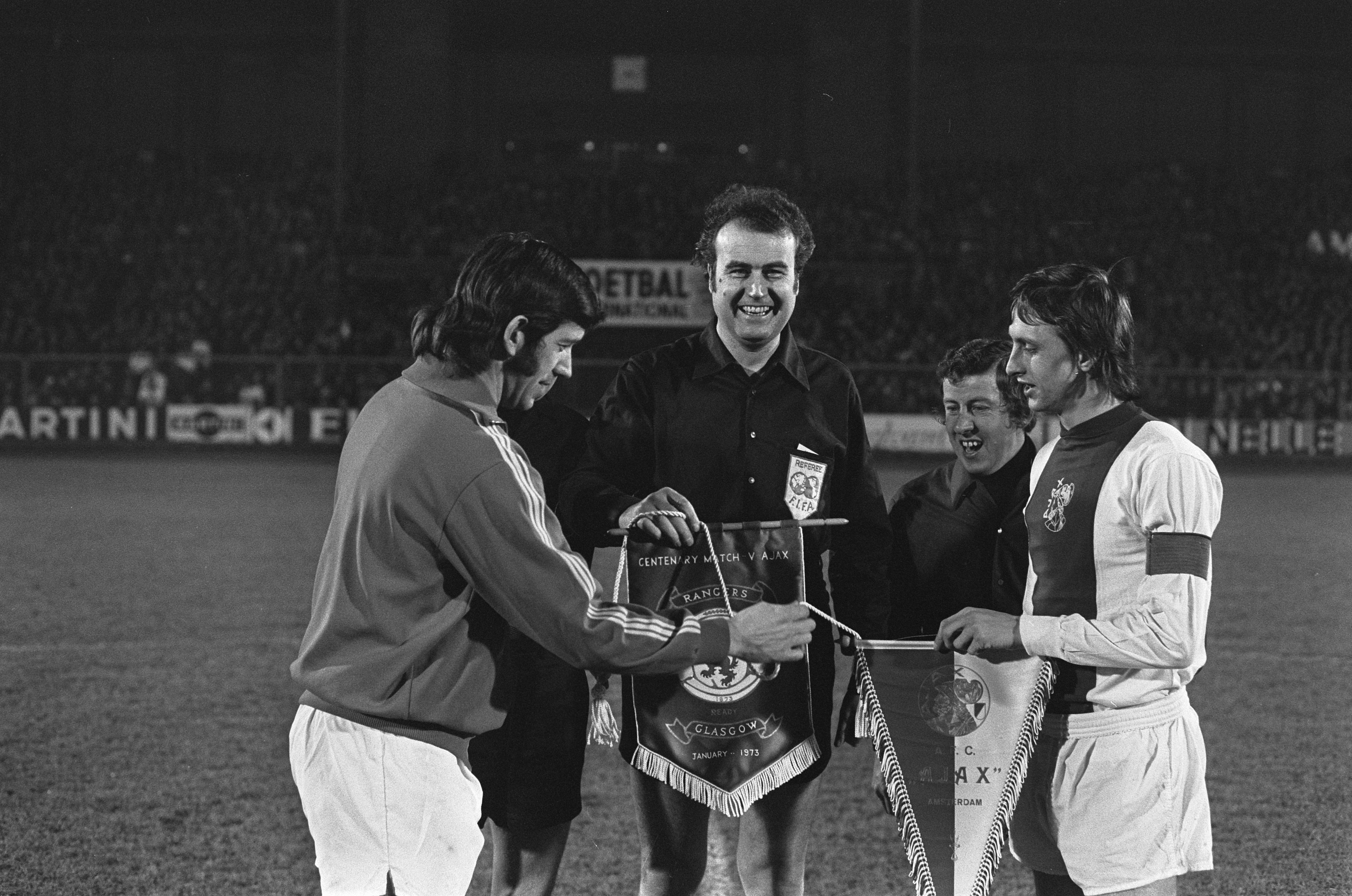
Greig (left) exchanging pennants with Ajax's Johan Cruyff, January 1973

As of 4 March 2019

International statistics
National team	Year	Apps	Goals
Scotland	1964	5	0
Scotland	1965	9	3
Scotland	1966	6	0
Scotland	1967	3	0
Scotland	1968	5	0
Scotland	1969	8	0
Scotland	1970	3	0
Scotland	1971	4	0
Scotland	1972	—	
Scotland	1973	—	
Scotland	1974	—	
Scotland	1975	1	0
Total		44	3

=== International goals ===
Scores and results list Scotland's goal tally first

Goal	Date	Venue	Opponent	Score	Result	Competition
1.	27 May 1965	Olympic Stadium, Helsinki	Finland	2–1	2–1	1966 World Cup qualification
2.	9 November 1965	Hampden Park, Glasgow	Italy	1–0	1–0	1966 World Cup qualification
3.	24 November 1965	Hampden Park, Glasgow	Wales	4–1	4–1	1965–66 British Home Championship

== Honours ==
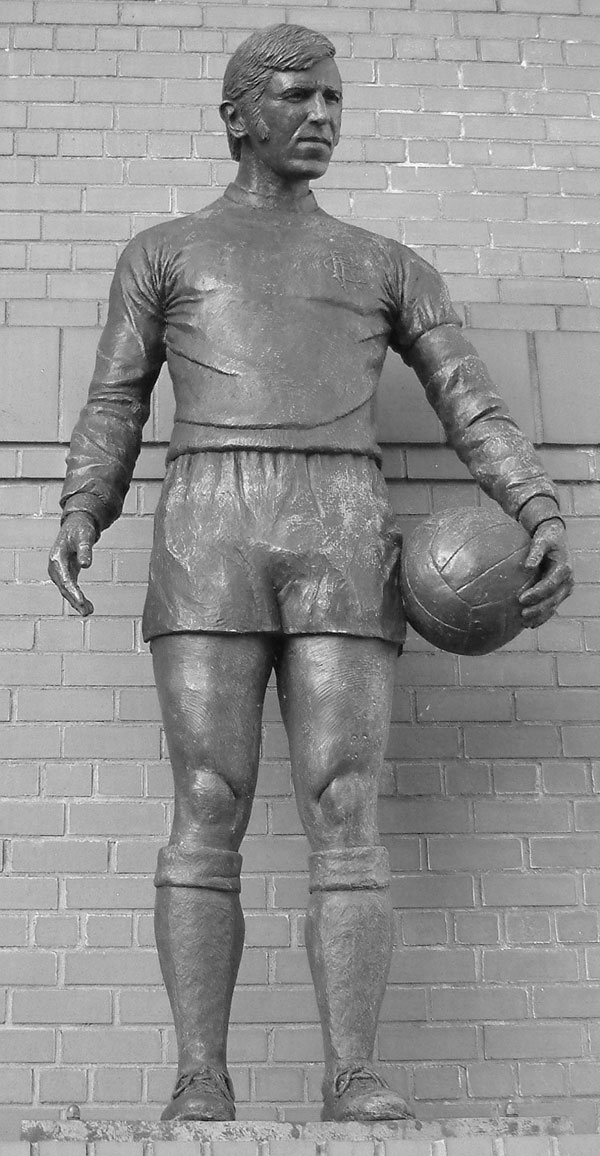
Statue of Greig at Ibrox Stadium, part of the memorial to the 1971 Ibrox disaster

Greig was appointed Member of the Order of the British Empire (MBE) on 15 November 1977. In June 2008, he was awarded honoris causa, from the University of Glasgow in recognition for outstanding achievement in football and continuing ambassadorship for the sport.

He was appointed Commander of the Order of the British Empire (CBE) in the 2023 Birthday Honours for services to association football and the community in Scotland.

=== As a player ===
==== Club ====
Rangers

- UEFA Cup Winners' Cup: 1971–72
- Scottish League First Division/Premier Division (5): 1962–63, 1963–64, 1974–75, 1975–76, 1977–78
- Scottish Cup (6): 1962–63, 1963–64, 1965–66, 1972–73, 1975–76, 1977–78
- Scottish League Cup (4): 1963–64, 1964–65, 1975–76, 1977–78

==== Individual ====
- SFWA Footballer of the Year: 1965–66, 1975–76
- Scottish Football Personality of the Year: 1978–79
- Scottish Football Hall of Fame (inaugural inductee)
- Scottish Sports Hall of Fame (inaugural inductee)
- Ballon d'Or: 1972 (18th place)

=== As a manager ===
- Scottish Cup: 1978–79, 1980–81
- Scottish League Cup: 1978–79, 1981–82

== See also ==
- List of one-club men in association football
- List of Scotland national football team captains
