= 1962–63 Scottish League Cup =

Tournament details
- Country: Scotland

Final positions
- Champions: Heart of Midlothian
- Runners-up: Kilmarnock

The 1962–63 Scottish League Cup was the seventeenth season of Scotland's second football knockout competition. The competition was won Heart of Midlothian, who defeated Kilmarnock in the Final.

== First round ==
=== Group 1 ===
Team	Pld	W	D	L	GF	GA	GR	Pts
Kilmarnock (A)	6	5	1	0	20	8	2.500	11
Dunfermline Athletic	6	2	3	1	16	12	1.333	7
Raith Rovers	6	1	3	2	10	11	0.909	5
Airdrieonians	6	0	1	5	5	20	0.250	1

Source: statto.com
(A) Advanced to Supplementary Round

Home team	Score	Away team	Date
Kilmarnock	4–0	Airdrieonians	11 August 1962
Raith Rovers	2–2	Dunfermline Athletic	11 August 1962
Airdrieonians	1–1	Raith Rovers	15 August 1962
Dunfermline Athletic	3–3	Kilmarnock	15 August 1962
Airdrieonians	2–4	Dunfermline Athletic	18 August 1962
Raith Rovers	2–3	Kilmarnock	18 August 1962
Airdrieonians	0–4	Kilmarnock	25 August 1962
Dunfermline Athletic	1–1	Raith Rovers	25 August 1962
Kilmarnock	3–2	Dunfermline Athletic	29 August 1962
Raith Rovers	3–1	Airdrieonians	29 August 1962
Dunfermline Athletic	4–1	Airdrieonians	1 September 1962
Kilmarnock	3–1	Raith Rovers	1 September 1962

=== Group 2 ===
Team	Pld	W	D	L	GF	GA	GR	Pts
Heart of Midlothian (A)	6	4	0	2	11	8	1.375	8
Celtic	6	3	1	2	12	5	2.400	7
Dundee United	6	2	1	3	7	11	0.636	5
Dundee	6	2	0	4	5	11	0.455	4

Source: statto.com
(A) Advanced to Supplementary Round

Home team	Score	Away team	Date
Celtic	3–1	Heart of Midlothian	11 August 1962
Dundee United	3–2	Dundee	11 August 1962
Dundee	1–0	Celtic	15 August 1962
Heart of Midlothian	3–1	Dundee United	15 August 1962
Celtic	4–0	Dundee United	18 August 1962
Dundee	0–2	Heart of Midlothian	18 August 1962
Dundee	2–1	Dundee United	25 August 1962
Heart of Midlothian	3–2	Celtic	25 August 1962
Celtic	3–0	Dundee	29 August 1962
Dundee United	2–0	Heart of Midlothian	29 August 1962
Dundee United	0–0	Celtic	1 September 1962
Heart of Midlothian	2–0	Dundee	1 September 1962

=== Group 3 ===
Team	Pld	W	D	L	GF	GA	GR	Pts
Partick Thistle (A)	6	4	1	1	12	5	2.400	9
Aberdeen	6	4	0	2	12	9	1.333	8
Motherwell	6	3	1	2	15	8	1.875	7
Falkirk	6	0	0	6	4	21	0.190	0

Source: statto.com
(A) Advanced to Supplementary Round

Home team	Score	Away team	Date
Motherwell	9–1	Falkirk	11 August 1962
Partick Thistle	1–2	Aberdeen	11 August 1962
Aberdeen	4–0	Motherwell	15 August 1962
Falkirk	1–3	Partick Thistle	15 August 1962
Aberdeen	3–0	Falkirk	18 August 1962
Partick Thistle	1–1	Motherwell	18 August 1962
Aberdeen	0–3	Partick Thistle	25 August 1962
Falkirk	0–1	Motherwell	25 August 1962
Motherwell	4–1	Aberdeen	29 August 1962
Partick Thistle	3–1	Falkirk	29 August 1962
Falkirk	1–2	Aberdeen	1 September 1962
Motherwell	0–1	Partick Thistle	1 September 1962

=== Group 4 ===
Team	Pld	W	D	L	GF	GA	GR	Pts
Rangers (A)	6	4	1	1	19	7	2.714	9
Hibernian	6	3	2	1	13	10	1.300	8
St Mirren	6	2	2	2	8	12	0.667	6
Third Lanark	6	0	1	5	9	20	0.450	1

Source: statto.com
(A) Advanced to Supplementary Round

Home team	Score	Away team	Date
Hibernian	1–4	Rangers	11 August 1962
Third Lanark	1–2	St Mirren	11 August 1962
Rangers	5–2	Third Lanark	15 August 1962
St. Mirren	3–3	Hibernian	15 August 1962
Hibernian	3–2	Third Lanark	18 August 1962
St. Mirren	2–1	Rangers	18 August 1962
Rangers	0–0	Hibernian	25 August 1962
St. Mirren	1–1	Third Lanark	25 August 1962
Hibernian	2–0	St Mirren	29 August 1962
Third Lanark	2–5	Rangers	29 August 1962
Rangers	4–0	St Mirren	1 September 1962
Third Lanark	1–4	Hibernian	1 September 1962

=== Group 5 ===
Team	Pld	W	D	L	GF	GA	GR	Pts
Berwick Rangers (A)	6	3	2	1	12	8	1.500	8
Ayr United	6	2	3	1	13	14	0.929	7
East Stirlingshire	6	2	1	3	12	12	1.000	5
Hamilton Academical	6	1	2	3	13	16	0.813	4

Source: statto.com
(A) Advanced to Supplementary Round

Home team	Score	Away team	Date
Berwick Rangers	3–2	Hamilton Academical	11 August 1962
East Stirlingshire	4–1	Ayr United	11 August 1962
Ayr United	2–2	Berwick Rangers	15 August 1962
Hamilton Academical	4–4	East Stirlingshire	15 August 1962
East Stirlingshire	3–2	Berwick Rangers	18 August 1962
Hamilton Academical	4–4	Ayr United	18 August 1962
Ayr United	2–1	East Stirlingshire	25 August 1962
Hamilton Academical	0–2	Berwick Rangers	25 August 1962
Berwick Rangers	1–1	Ayr United	29 August 1962
East Stirlingshire	0–1	Hamilton Academical	29 August 1962
Ayr United	3–2	Hamilton Academical	1 September 1962
Berwick Rangers	2–0	East Stirlingshire	1 September 1962

=== Group 6 ===
Team	Pld	W	D	L	GF	GA	GR	Pts
St Johnstone (A)	6	5	0	1	18	7	2.571	10
Clyde	6	5	0	1	17	7	2.429	10
Stranraer	6	1	0	5	7	18	0.389	2
Cowdenbeath	6	1	0	5	6	16	0.375	2

Source: statto.com
(A) Advanced to Supplementary Round

Home team	Score	Away team	Date
Cowdenbeath	1–2	Clyde	11 August 1962
St Johnstone	1–0	Stranraer	11 August 1962
Clyde	5–1	St Johnstone	15 August 1962
Stranraer	2–1	Cowdenbeath	15 August 1962
Cowdenbeath	0–7	St Johnstone	18 August 1962
Stranraer	3–5	Clyde	18 August 1962
Clyde	1–0	Cowdenbeath	25 August 1962
Stranraer	1–4	St Johnstone	25 August 1962
Cowdenbeath	3–0	Stranraer	29 August 1962
St Johnstone	1–0	Clyde	29 August 1962
Clyde	4–1	Stranraer	1 September 1962
St Johnstone	4–1	Cowdenbeath	1 September 1962

=== Group 7 ===
Team	Pld	W	D	L	GF	GA	GR	Pts
Queen of the South (A)	6	3	2	1	13	7	1.857	8
Montrose	6	2	2	2	10	5	2.000	6
East Fife	6	3	0	3	8	15	0.533	6
Queen's Park	6	1	2	3	13	17	0.765	4

Source: statto.com
(A) Advanced to Supplementary Round

Home team	Score	Away team	Date
Montrose	3–1	Queen's Park	11 August 1962
Queen of the South	3–1	East Fife	11 August 1962
East Fife	0–5	Montrose	15 August 1962
Queen's Park	0–4	Queen of the South	15 August 1962
Queen of the South	2–1	Montrose	18 August 1962
Queen's Park	3–0	East Fife	18 August 1962
East Fife	1–0	Queen of the South	25 August 1962
Queen's Park	1–1	Montrose	25 August 1962
Montrose	0–1	East Fife	29 August 1962
Queen of the South	4–4	Queen's Park	29 August 1962
East Fife	5–4	Queen's Park	1 September 1962
Montrose	0–0	Queen of the South	1 September 1962

=== Group 8 ===
Team	Pld	W	D	L	GF	GA	GR	Pts
Morton (A)	6	4	2	0	19	10	1.900	10
Arbroath	6	3	3	0	16	11	1.455	9
Alloa Athletic	6	1	2	3	9	15	0.600	4
Stirling Albion	6	0	1	5	7	15	0.467	1

Source: statto.com
(A) Advanced to Supplementary Round

Home team	Score	Away team	Date
Morton	2–2	Arbroath	11 August 1962
Stirling Albion	1–1	Alloa Athletic	11 August 1962
Alloa Athletic	2–3	Morton	15 August 1962
Arbroath	3–2	Stirling Albion	15 August 1962
Arbroath	3–0	Alloa Athletic	18 August 1962
Stirling Albion	1–4	Morton	18 August 1962
Alloa Athletic	2–1	Stirling Albion	25 August 1962
Arbroath	3–3	Morton	25 August 1962
Morton	5–2	Alloa Athletic	29 August 1962
Stirling Albion	2–3	Arbroath	29 August 1962
Alloa Athletic	2–2	Arbroath	1 September 1962
Morton	2–0	Stirling Albion	1 September 1962

=== Group 9 ===
Team	Pld	W	D	L	GF	GA	GR	Pts
Dumbarton (A)	4	3	1	0	12	7	1.714	7
Stenhousemuir	4	2	1	1	7	6	1.167	5
Forfar Athletic	4	1	2	1	4	4	1.000	4
Albion Rovers	4	1	1	2	8	7	1.143	3
Brechin City	4	0	1	3	5	12	0.417	1

Source: statto.com
(A) Advanced to Supplementary Round

Home team	Score	Away team	Date
Albion Rovers	3–5	Dumbarton	11 August 1962
Stenhousemuir	2–1	Brechin City	11 August 1962
Dumbarton	1–1	Stenhousemuir	15 August 1962
Forfar Athletic	0–0	Albion Rovers	15 August 1962
Brechin City	3–5	Dumbarton	18 August 1962
Stenhousemuir	2–3	Forfar Athletic	18 August 1962
Brechin City	0–4	Albion Rovers	25 August 1962
Dumbarton	1–0	Forfar Athletic	25 August 1962
Albion Rovers	1–2	Stenhousemuir	1 September 1962
Forfar Athletic	1–1	Brechin City	1 September 1962

== Supplementary round ==
=== First leg ===
Home team	Score	Away team	Date
Dumbarton	0–0	Berwick Rangers	3 September 1962

=== Second leg ===
Home team	Score	Away team	Date	Agg
Berwick Rangers	1–2	Dumbarton	5 September 1962	1–2

== Quarter-finals ==
=== First leg ===
Home team	Score	Away team	Date
Dumbarton	1–3	Rangers	12 September 1962
Morton	0–3	Heart of Midlothian	12 September 1962
Partick Thistle	1–2	Kilmarnock	12 September 1962
Queen of the South	1–0	St Johnstone	12 September 1962

=== Second leg ===
Home team	Score	Away team	Date	Agg
Heart of Midlothian	3–1	Morton	19 September 1962	6–1
Kilmarnock	3–1	Partick Thistle	19 September 1962	5–2
Rangers	1–1	Dumbarton	19 September 1962	4–2
St Johnstone	4–1	Queen of the South	19 September 1962	4–2

== Semi-finals ==
Home team	Score	Away team	Date
Heart of Midlothian	4–0	St Johnstone	10 October 1962
Kilmarnock	3–2	Rangers	10 October 1962

== Final ==
27 October 1962

Kilmarnock	0–1	Heart of Midlothian
		Davidson 25'

Hampden Park, Glasgow
Attendance: 51,000
