= Scot Symon =

Scottish footballer and manager (1911–1985)

Personal information
- Full name: James Scotland Symon
- Date of birth: 9 May 1911
- Place of birth: Errol, Perthshire, Scotland
- Date of death: 30 April 1985 (aged 73)
- Place of death: Glasgow, Scotland
- Position: Wing half

Senior career*
Years	Team	Apps	(Gls)
1930–1935	Dundee	150	(2)
1935–1938	Portsmouth	66	(6)
1938–1947	Rangers	32	(3)
Total		248	(11)

International career
1938	Scotland	1	(0)

Managerial career
- 1947–1953: East Fife
- 1953–1954: Preston North End
- 1954–1967: Rangers
- 1968–1970: Partick Thistle
- * Club domestic league appearances and goals

James Scotland Symon (9 May 1911 – 30 April 1985) was a Scottish football player and manager. He also played cricket for Scotland.

== Playing career ==
Symon started his professional career at Dundee in 1930. He then spent three years with English team Portsmouth before signing for Rangers in 1938. He also won a Scotland cap in 1938 against Hungary. He only played 37 Scottish League games for Rangers but helped the club win the league title in 1939.

His career was then interrupted by the onset of World War II; during the conflict he continued to play for Rangers and made over 250 appearances in unofficial competitions (almost all of which the club won). Symon retired from playing in 1947, making his final appearance a few weeks before his 36th birthday and securing the official league championship again in his final season.

== Managerial career ==
Symon returned to Rangers in 1954 as a manager, where he would steer the team to six League championships, five Scottish Cups, and four League Cups. He also took the club into European football for the first time, guiding them to two Cup Winners' Cup finals in 1961 and 1967, both ending in defeat.

Symon was the Rangers manager when they lost to Berwick Rangers in the Scottish Cup on 28 January 1967. When Symon was sensationally sacked by Rangers in November 1967 (in spite of the team leading the league table at that point), he was told of the decision by an accountant. Symon was the manager who signed Alex Ferguson for Rangers.

== Cricket career ==
Symon played cricket for Scotland in 1938, taking five Australian wickets for just 33 runs.

== Honours ==
=== Manager ===
East Fife

- Scottish Division B: 1947–48
- Scottish League Cup: 1947–48, 1949–50
- B Division Supplementary Cup: 1946–47, 1947–48

Rangers

- Scottish Division One (6): 1955–56, 1956–57, 1958–59, 1960–61, 1962–63, 1963–64
- Scottish Cup: 1959–60, 1961–62, 1962–63, 1963–64, 1965–66
- Scottish League Cup: 1960–61, 1961–62, 1963–64, 1964–65

== See also ==
- List of Scottish cricket and football players
