= 1962–63 Scottish Division One =

57th season of top-tier football league in Scotland

Scottish Division One
- Season: 1962–63
- Champions: Rangers
- Relegated: Clyde; Raith Rovers

The 1962–63 Scottish Division One was won by Rangers by nine points over nearest rival Kilmarnock. Clyde and Raith Rovers finished 17th and 18th respectively and were relegated to the 1963-64 Second Division.

== League table ==
Pos	Team	Pld	W	D	L	GF	GA	GR	Pts	Qualification or relegation
1	Rangers (C)	34	25	7	2	94	28	3.357	57	Qualified for the European Cup
2	Kilmarnock	34	20	8	6	92	40	2.300	48	
3	Partick Thistle	34	20	6	8	66	44	1.500	46	Invited for the Inter-Cities Fairs Cup
4	Celtic	34	19	6	9	76	44	1.727	44	Qualified for the Cup Winners' Cup
5	Hearts	34	17	9	8	85	59	1.441	43	Invited for the Inter-Cities Fairs Cup
6	Aberdeen	34	17	7	10	70	47	1.489	41	
7	Dundee United	34	15	11	8	67	52	1.288	41	
8	Dunfermline	34	13	8	13	50	47	1.064	34	
9	Dundee	34	12	9	13	60	49	1.224	33	
10	Motherwell	34	10	11	13	60	63	0.952	31	
11	Airdrieonians	34	14	2	18	52	76	0.684	30	
12	St Mirren	34	10	8	16	52	72	0.722	28	
13	Falkirk	34	12	3	19	54	69	0.783	27	
14	Third Lanark	34	9	8	17	56	68	0.824	26	
15	Queen of the South	34	10	6	18	36	75	0.480	26	
16	Hibernian	34	8	9	17	47	67	0.701	25	
17	Clyde (R)	34	9	5	20	49	83	0.590	23	Relegated to the Second Division
18	Raith Rovers (R)	34	2	5	27	35	118	0.297	9	Relegated to the Second Division

Source: RSSSF
(C) Champions; (R) Relegated

== Results ==
Home \ Away	ABE	AIR	CEL	CLY	DND	DNU	DNF	FAL	HOM	HIB	KIL	MOT	PAR	QOS	RAI	RAN	STM	THI
Aberdeen		2–1	1–5	0–2	1–0	1–2	4–0	1–0	2–1	3–0	1–0	1–1	1–1	4–1	10–0	2–3	0–1	4–1
Airdrieonians	2–0		1–6	3–1	1–0	4–2	0–1	2–1	4–2	2–1	0–3	1–4	2–0	1–3	8–1	0–2	4–2	1–4
Celtic	1–2	3–1		2–0	4–1	1–0	2–1	2–1	2–2	2–0	1–1	6–0	0–2	0–1	4–1	0–1	1–1	2–1
Clyde	1–3	2–0	1–3		3–2	1–3	0–1	0–1	0–6	3–1	0–5	2–3	1–2	1–1	4–2	1–3	2–0	3–2
Dundee	2–2	2–1	0–0	2–0		1–2	1–0	2–1	2–2	1–3	1–0	2–2	2–1	10–2	1–1	0–0	5–1	5–2
Dundee United	3–3	3–1	3–0	4–1	1–1		0–4	1–0	0–0	5–0	3–3	2–1	2–2	2–1	8–1	2–1	1–1	1–0
Dunfermline Athletic	3–0	2–0	1–1	2–2	2–0	1–2		2–1	2–2	3–2	1–1	4–3	1–1	2–0	6–0	1–2	1–3	3–0
Falkirk	2–1	0–1	1–3	7–3	0–2	4–1	2–0		2–0	3–1	0–5	3–2	0–2	2–2	2–3	0–2	4–2	3–5
Heart of Midlothian	1–1	6–1	4–3	1–1	3–1	2–2	2–0	5–0		3–3	2–3	2–1	2–4	3–0	2–1	0–5	5–0	2–0
Hibernian	2–3	0–2	1–1	1–2	2–2	1–1	1–1	0–3	0–4		0–2	1–0	0–2	3–0	1–0	1–5	2–1	1–1
Kilmarnock	2–2	8–0	6–0	3–2	1–0	2–2	3–0	3–1	2–2	2–0		7–1	1–2	7–0	3–1	1–0	2–1	2–2
Motherwell	0–2	3–0	0–2	6–2	2–1	0–0	0–0	4–1	1–3	2–2	2–1		1–1	1–2	5–1	1–1	1–1	3–3
Partick Thistle	2–3	3–0	1–5	5–1	1–0	3–0	2–1	2–0	3–4	2–2	3–2	2–0		0–1	4–1	1–4	2–1	3–1
Queen of the South	2–1	1–1	2–5	2–2	1–0	1–0	1–0	0–1	0–3	0–4	1–1	0–2	0–1		5–1	0–4	2–3	2–1
Raith Rovers	0–4	0–1	0–2	1–1	2–4	2–7	1–2	1–3	0–3	0–4	1–4	2–5	2–3	1–1		2–2	0–1	1–1
Rangers	2–2	5–2	4–0	3–1	1–1	5–0	1–1	4–0	5–1	3–1	6–1	1–1	2–1	3–1	4–2		3–0	1–0
St Mirren	2–1	1–1	0–7	1–2	0–3	2–1	3–1	2–2	7–3	2–2	2–4	2–0	1–1	4–0	1–2	0–2		2–4
Third Lanark	1–2	2–3	2–0	2–1	4–3	1–1	4–0	3–3	1–2	1–4	0–1	2–2	0–1	1–0	2–1	1–4	1–1	

Legend: Blue = home team win; Yellow = draw; Red = away team win.
