= 1963–64 Dumbarton F.C. season =

Dumbarton
1963–1964 season
- Manager: Jackie Fearn
- Stadium: Boghead Park, Dumbarton
- Scottish League Division 2: 6th
- Scottish Cup: Second Round
- Scottish League Cup: Prelims
- Top goalscorer: League: Tommy Halliday (9); All: Don Bowie/ Tommy Halliday (12)

The 1963–64 season was the 80th football season in which Dumbarton competed at a Scottish national level, entering the Scottish Football League, the Scottish Cup and the Scottish League Cup. In addition Dumbarton competed in the Stirlingshire Cup.

== Scottish Second Division ==
While never really considered at any time as serious challengers, manager Jackie Fearn guided Dumbarton to a respectable 6th place in Division 2 with 38 points, a distant 29 behind champions Morton.

4 September 1963 Division 2	Morton	5–1	Dumbarton	Cappielow Park
	McGraw 9'; Wilson 17' (o.g.); Wilson, J 32'; McTurk 37'; Adamson 86'		Fraser 57'	Attendance: 10,000; Referee: JM Kelly

7 September 1963 Division 2	Dumbarton	5–2	Stirling Albion	Boghead Park
	Halliday 7', 36'; Hodgson 78', 85'; Fraser 87'		Gilmour 20'; Lawlor 50'	Attendance: 1,000; Referee: G Paterson

14 September 1963 Division 2	Queen's Park	2–1	Dumbarton	Hampden Park
	Buchanan 18', 34'		Hodgson 82'	Attendance: 2,000; Referee: A McKenzie

18 September 1963 Division 2	Dumbarton	0–2	Albion Rovers	Boghead Park
			Bowie 40'; Hood 75'

21 September 1963 Division 2	Dumbarton	1–3	East Fife	Boghead Park
	McLuskie 28'		Dewar 7'; Stewart 62', 83'	Attendance: 1,500; Referee: W Syme

25 September 1963 Division 2	Albion Rovers	3–3	Dumbarton	Cliftonhill Stadium
	Campbell 3', 4'; Hood 55'		Black 26', 50'; Bowie 28'	Referee: R Rodger

28 September 1963 Division 2	Dumbarton	3–1	Forfar Athletic	Boghead Park
	Halliday 25'; Bowie 84'; Masse 89'		Ewan 31'	Attendance: 1,100; Referee: W Elliot

5 October 1963 Division 2	Stenhousemuir	0–1	Dumbarton	Ochilview Park
			Halliday 15'	Attendance: 500; Referee: D Small

12 October 1963 Division 2	Dumbarton	4–1	Stranraer	Boghead Park
	Halliday 3', 45'; Lawlor 57'; Bingham 64'		Logan 55'	Attendance: 1,300

19 October 1963 Division 2	Dumbarton	4–0	Raith Rovers	Boghead Park
	Lawlor 9' (pen.); Bingham 19'; Hodgson 77', 79'			Attendance: 1,000; Referee: J Callaghan

26 October 1963 Division 2	Montrose	2–1	Dumbarton	Links Park
	Wallace 60'; Black 87' (o.g.)		Harra 80'	Attendance: 1,500; Referee: W Fyfe

2 November 1963 Division 2	Hamilton	1–3	Dumbarton	Douglas Park
	Carmichael 17'		Black 36'; Taggart 40', 55'	Attendance: 2,500; Referee: D Weir

9 November 1963 Division 2	Dumbarton	3–2	Ayr United	Boghead Park
	Lawlor 59'; Fraser 61'; Harra 78' (pen.)		Kilgannon 21', 47'	Attendance: 3,000; Referee: G Bowman

16 November 1963 Division 2	Arbroath	4–0	Dumbarton	Gayfield Park
	Easson 55', 57'; Murray 80'; Cargill 81'			Attendance: 1,800; Referee: H Phillips

23 November 1963 Division 2	Dumbarton	1–1	Brechin City	Boghead Park
	Bowie 40'		Thoms 83'	Attendance: 1,400; Referee: A Kidd

30 November 1963 Division 2	Cowdenbeath	0–1	Dumbarton	Central Park, Cowdenbeath
			McDonald 20'	Attendance: 500; Referee: J Hamilton

7 December 1963 Division 2	Berwick Rangers	2–3	Dumbarton	Shielfield Park
	Cunnigham 1'; Jackson 3'		Harra 32'; Lawlor 36'; Black 56'	Attendance: 500; Referee: D Spiers

14 December 1963 Division 2	Dumbarton	2–1	Alloa Athletic	Boghead Park
	Black 60'; Callaghan 75'		Curran 36' (o.g.)	Attendance: 1,000; Referee: A Roper

21 December 1963 Division 2	Dumbarton	0–1	Clyde	Boghead Park
			McLean 64'	Attendance: 1,500; Referee: J McConville

1 January 1964 Division 2	Stirling Albion	1–1	Dumbarton	Annfield Stadium
	McBeth 69'		Fraser 21'	Attendance: 1,008; Referee: JP Barclay

2 January 1964 Division 2	Dumbarton	1–4	Queen's Park	Boghead Park
	Harra 23' (pen.)		Buchanan 11', 65'; Ingram 18'; Miller 25'	Referee: J Dearie

4 January 1964 Division 2	East Fife	2–2	Dumbarton	Bayview Park, Methil
	Stewart 17'; Aitken 74'		Black 26'; Bowie 89'	Attendance: 1,400; Referee: A Kidd

18 January 1964 Division 2	Forfar Athletic	0–2	Dumbarton	Station Park, Forfar
			Callaghan 28', 63'	Attendance: 500; Referee: A Webster

1 February 1964 Division 2	Dumbarton	3–2	Stenhousemuir	Boghead Park
	Bowie 13', 55'; Lawlor 42'		Delaney 82', 86'	Attendance: 900; Referee: W Elliot

8 February 1964 Division 2	Stranraer	2–2	Dumbarton	Stair Park
	McGill 49'; Hanlon 85'		Veitch 22'; Smith 72'	Attendance: 1,050; Referee: J McConville

15 February 1964 Division 2	Raith Rovers	2–1	Dumbarton	Starks Park
	McNiven 44'; Laurie 85'		McNiven 5' (o.g.)	Attendance: 1,000; Referee: W Fyfe

22 February 1964 Division 2	Dumbarton	2–1	Montrose	Boghead Park
	Slaven 44'; Harra 81'		Trialist 73'	Attendance: 900; Referee: J Callaghan

29 February 1964 Division 2	Dumbarton	2–0	Hamilton	Boghead Park
	Brown 15'; Harra 77' (pen.)			Attendance: 1,000; Referee: W Syme

7 March 1964 Division 2	Brechin City	2–1	Dumbarton	Glebe Park, Brechin
	Thoms 7'; Sharp 66'		Lawlor 36'	Attendance: 300; Referee: J Wallace

14 March 1964 Division 2	Dumbarton	1–0	Arbroath	Boghead Park
	Kelly 79'			Attendance: 350; Referee: H Phillips

28 March 1964 Division 2	Dumbarton	8–0	Cowdenbeath	Boghead Park
	Lawlor 20'; Callaghan 24', 40'; Fraser 35', 51'; Bowie 45'; Veitch 63'			Attendance: 1,000; Referee: W Brittle

4 April 1964 Division 2	Dumbarton	1–1	Berwick Rangers	Boghead Park
	McEwan 63'		Bowron 83'	Attendance: 1,000; Referee: I Hamilton

13 April 1964 Division 2	Dumbarton	0–2	Morton	Boghead Park
			McGraw 7'; Campbell 73'	Referee: WM Syme

18 April 1964 Division 2	Alloa Athletic	2–1	Dumbarton	Recreation Park, Alloa
	Hodge 7', 72'		Brown 75'	Attendance: 500; Referee: J Dearie

23 April 1964 Division 2	Clyde	4–2	Dumbarton	Shawfield Stadium
	McLean 20'; Hood 48'; McFarlane 49'; Reid 63'		Bowie 65'; McKenna 69'	Attendance: 582; Referee: W Elliott

29 April 1964 Division 2	Ayr United	1–0	Dumbarton	Somerset Park
	Murphy 50'			Referee: D Weir

== Scottish League Cup ==
In the League Cup, with 2 wins and a draw from their sectional ties, Dumbarton failed to qualify for the knock out stages.

10 August 1963 Group 8	Arbroath	1–1	Dumbarton	Gayfield Park
	Matthews 16'		Bowie 37'	Attendance: 3,000; Referee: A Webster

14 August 1963 Group 8	Dumbarton	3–0	Raith Rovers	Boghead Park
	Coyle 30'; Hodgson 48'; Halliday 53'			Referee: H Phillips

17 August 1963 Group 8	Dumbarton	2–3	East Fife	Boghead Park
	Hodgson 73'; Halliday 82'		Yardley 10'; Aitken 28', 30'	Attendance: 3,000; Referee: W Hamilton

24 August 1963 Group 8	Dumbarton	1–2	Arbroath	Boghead Park
	Halliday 2'		Morrison 12'; Murray 72'	Attendance: 3,000; Referee: J McConville

28 August 1963 Group 8	Raith Rovers	1–2	Dumbarton	Starks Park
	Gilpin 64'		Bowie 43'; Black 77'	Referee: R Crockett

31 August 1963 Group 8	East Fife	4–2	Dumbarton	Bayview Park, Methil
	Aitken 1', 41'; Dewar 49'; McWatt 50'		Brown 24', 29'	Attendance: 2,000; Referee: W Mullen

== Scottish Cup ==
In the Scottish Cup, after an easy first round win, Dumbarton were not disgraced in their loss in the second round to Division 1 opponents Motherwell.

11 January 1964 Cup R1	Dumbarton	4–0	Raith Rovers	Boghead Park
	Black 2'; Callaghan 68'; Bowie 69', 80'			Attendance: 3,200; Referee: J McKenzie

25 January 1964 Cup R2	Motherwell	4–1	Dumbarton	Fir Park
	McBride 15', 20', 29'; Robertson 76'		Delaney 82' (o.g.)	Attendance: 7,500; Referee: W Elliot

== Stirlingshire Cup ==
Dumbarton lost out to Stenhousemuir in the first round of the county cup.

26 November 1963 First Round	Stenhousemuir	2–1	Dumbarton	Ochilview Park
	Bryce		Harra

== Friendlies ==
19 August 1963 Friendly	Forth & Endrick League XI	2–8	Dumbarton	Bannockburn
	Lees		Black; Wilson; Hodgson; Feaser; Halliday; Ross

11 September 1963 Friendly	Dumbarton	2–1	Airdrie	Boghead Park
	Goal		Goal

5 November 1963 Friendly	Dumbarton	1–1	Erskine XI	Boghead Park
	Lawlor		Goal

12 April 1964 Friendly	Dumbarton	2–3	Ross County	Boghead Park
	Harra 20' (pen.); Callaghan 35'		Vass 9'; Howie	Referee: W Weir

== Player statistics ==
=== Squad ===
No.	Pos	Nat	Player	Total		Second Division		Scottish Cup		League Cup	
No.	Pos	Nat	Player	Apps	Goals	Apps	Goals	Apps	Goals	Apps	Goals
	GK	(Scotland) SCO	George Brinkworth	1	0	1	0	0	0	0	0
	GK	(Scotland) SCO	Andy Crawford	8	0	8	0	0	0	0	0
	GK	(Scotland) SCO	Doug Robertson	35	0	27	0	2	0	6	0
	DF	(Scotland) SCO	Alan Black	31	8	27	6	2	1	2	1
	DF	(Scotland) SCO	Tommy Govan	43	0	35	0	2	0	6	0
	DF	(Scotland) SCO	Andy Jardine	32	0	24	0	2	0	6	0
	DF	(Scotland) SCO	Jim Lachlan	4	0	4	0	0	0	0	0
	DF	(Scotland) SCO	Tommy Sturgeon	1	0	1	0	0	0	0	0
	MF	(Scotland) SCO	Billy Corrigan	2	0	2	0	0	0	0	0
	MF	(Scotland) SCO	Ronnie Curran	38	0	31	0	2	0	5	0
	MF	(Scotland) SCO	George Gallagher	1	0	1	0	0	0	0	0
	MF	(Scotland) SCO	Hugh Harra	38	6	31	6	2	0	5	0
	MF	(Scotland) SCO	George Masse	7	1	4	1	0	0	3	0
	MF	(Scotland) SCO	Tom Murray	1	0	1	0	0	0	0	0
	MF	(Scotland) SCO	Gerry Quinn	4	0	4	0	0	0	0	0
	MF	(Scotland) SCO	George Taggart	29	2	27	2	2	0	0	0
	MF	(Scotland) SCO	Jimmy Veitch	14	2	13	2	1	0	0	0
	MF	(Scotland) SCO	Joe Wilson	8	0	2	0	0	0	6	0
	FW	(Scotland) SCO	Alec Bingham	21	2	19	2	1	0	1	0
	FW	(Scotland) SCO	Don Bowie	39	12	31	8	2	2	6	2
	FW	(Scotland) SCO	Tommy Brown	7	4	5	2	0	0	2	2
	FW	(Scotland) SCO	Willie Callaghan	24	7	22	6	2	1	0	0
	FW	(Scotland) SCO	Don Carswell	1	0	1	0	0	0	0	0
	FW	(Scotland) SCO	Johnny Coyle	2	1	0	0	0	0	2	1
	FW	(Scotland) SCO	Gordon Douglas	1	0	1	0	0	0	0	0
	FW	(Scotland) SCO	Jim Fraser	16	5	13	5	0	0	3	0
	FW	(Scotland) SCO	Stephen Gnaulati	6	0	3	0	0	0	3	0
	FW	(Scotland) SCO	Tommy Halliday	14	12	8	9	0	0	6	3
	FW	(Scotland) SCO	Jimmy Hodgson	14	5	10	3	0	0	4	2
	FW	(Scotland) SCO	Jimmy Horne	1	0	1	0	0	0	0	0
	FW	(Scotland) SCO	John Kelly	2	1	2	1	0	0	0	0
	FW	(Scotland) SCO	Kenny Knox	2	1	2	1	0	0	0	0
	FW	(Scotland) SCO	John Lawlor	27	7	25	7	2	0	0	0
	FW	(Scotland) SCO	Jim McDonald	1	1	1	1	0	0	0	0
	FW	(Scotland) SCO	Malcolm McEwan	1	1	1	1	0	0	0	0
	FW	(Scotland) SCO	Norrie McKay	1	0	1	0	0	0	0	0
	FW	(Scotland) SCO	John McKenna	1	1	1	1	0	0	0	0
	FW	(Scotland) SCO	John McLuskie	3	1	3	1	0	0	0	0
	FW	(Scotland) SCO	Willie Munn	1	0	1	0	0	0	0	0
	FW	(Scotland) SCO	Bobby Slaven	1	1	1	1	0	0	0	0
	FW	(Scotland) SCO	Bobby Smith	2	1	2	1	0	0	0	0

=== Transfers ===
Amongst those players joining and leaving the club were the following:

==== Players in ====
Player	From	Date
(Scotland) Alec Bingham	(Scotland) Irvine Meadow	29 Jul 1963
(Scotland) Andy Crawford	(England) Arsenal	29 Jul 1963
(Scotland) Ronnie Curran	(Scotland) Irvine Meadow	29 Jul 1963
(Scotland) George Taggart	(Scotland) Berwick Rangers	25 Sep 1963
(Scotland) John Lawlor	(Scotland) Stirling Albion	10 Oct 1963
(Scotland) Willie Callaghan	(Scotland) Aberdeen	12 Oct 1963

==== Players out ====
Player	To	Date
(Scotland) Benny Friel	(England) Southend United	25 May 1963
(Scotland) Tommy Halliday	(Wales) Cardiff City	19 Oct 1963
(Scotland) Jimmy Hodgson	(Scotland) Starnraer	12 Dec 1963
(Scotland) Joe Wilson	(Scotland) Alloa Athletic	12 Dec 1963
(Scotland) Alec Bingham	(Scotland) Freed	30 Apr 1964
(Scotland) Willie Callaghan	(Scotland) Freed	30 Apr 1964
(Scotland) George Taggart	(Scotland) Freed	30 Apr 1964
