= 1962–63 Dumbarton F.C. season =

Dumbarton
1962–1963 season
- Manager: Jackie Fearn
- Stadium: Boghead Park, Dumbarton
- Scottish League Division 2: 12th
- Scottish Cup: First round
- Scottish League Cup: Quarter-finals
- Top goalscorer: League: Jimmy Hodgson (14); All: Jimmy Hodgson (14)

The 1962–63 season was the 79th football season in which Dumbarton competed at a Scottish national level, entering the Scottish Football League, the Scottish Cup and the Scottish League Cup. In addition Dumbarton competed in the Stirlingshire Cup.

== Scottish Second Division ==
After the previous season's disappointments, Dumbarton were having similar problems in the league until a run of five victories at the end of the campaign improved the team's position to finish in a creditable 12th place with 34 points, 21 behind champions St Johnstone.

22 August 1962 Division 2	Alloa Athletic	2–0	Dumbarton	Recreation Park, Alloa
	Foley 40'; Smith 47'			Referee: RH Davidson

28 August 1962 Division 2	Stenhousemuir	1–0	Dumbarton	Ochilview Park
	Morrison 31'			Referee: W Elliot

8 September 1962 Division 2	Dumbarton	1–2	Queen's Park	Boghead Park
	Kilgannon 16'		McKay 49', 84'	Attendance: 2,500; Referee: J Dearie

15 September 1962 Division 2	Montrose	0–2	Dumbarton	Links Park
			Hodgson 60'; Newlands 88'	Attendance: 1,400; Referee: F Crossley

22 September 1962 Division 2	Dumbarton	1–3	Albion Rovers	Boghead Park
	Miller 67'		Taylor 24', 35', 87'	Attendance: 2,000; Referee: W Stewart

29 September 1962 Division 2	Berwick Rangers	1–0	Dumbarton	Shielfield Park
	Smith 70'			Attendance: 1,200; Referee: J Paterson

6 October 1962 Division 2	Dumbarton	0–3	Morton	Boghead Park
			McLaughlin 32', 40'; Wilson 90'	Attendance: 3,000; Referee: J Kelly

13 October 1962 Division 2	Brechin City	0–3	Dumbarton	Glebe Park, Brechin
			Miller 30'; Hodgson 48', 71'	Attendance: 750; Referee: G Bowman

27 October 1962 Division 2	Dumbarton	5–1	Stranraer	Boghead Park
	Bain 34'; Miller 51'; Kilgannon 55', 76'; Wilson 85'		Dunlop 2'	Attendance: 2,000; Referee: F Crossley

3 November 1962 Division 2	Dumbarton	5–2	East Fife	Boghead Park
	Bain 19', 35'; Wilson 46' (pen.); Hodgson 49', 53'		Trialist 60'; Walker 61'	Attendance: 2,000; Referee: W Syme

10 November 1962 Division 2	St Johnstone	2–0	Dumbarton	Muirton Park
	Bell 88'; Kemp 89'			Attendance: 7,000; Referee: T Wharton

17 November 1962 Division 2	Dumbarton	0–1	Hamilton	Boghead Park
			Jardine 15' (o.g.)	Attendance: 1,500; Referee: G Weir

24 November 1962 Division 2	Stirling Albion	3–1	Dumbarton	Annfield Stadium
	Park 46', 51', 68'		Govan 40'	Attendance: 1,500; Referee: J Stewart

1 December 1962 Division 2	Dumbarton	3–1	Ayr United	Boghead Park
	Wilson 10'; Waters 72', 85'		Harra 35' (o.g.)	Attendance: 1,000; Referee: R Rodgers

8 December 1962 Division 2	Arbroath	4–2	Dumbarton	Gayfield Park
	Murray 21'; Soutar 69'; Kennedy 72'; Robertson 80'		Melvin 20'; Freil 85'	Attendance: 1,000; Referee: A Kidd

29 December 1962 Division 2	Dumbarton	1–0	Alloa Athletic	Boghead Park
	McLeod 75'			Attendance: 800; Referee: J Kelly

1 January 1963 Division 2	Queen's Park	2–2	Dumbarton	Hampden Park
	Buchanan 41', 55'		Miller 4'; McLeod 27'	Referee: J Dearie

5 January 1963 Division 2	Albion Rovers	1–0	Dumbarton	Cliftonhill Stadium
	McLeod 85'			Attendance: 1,000; Referee: J McConville

26 January 1963 Division 2	Dumbarton	1–0	Forfar Athletic	Boghead Park
	Hodgson 20'			Referee: J Paterson

2 February 1963 Division 2	Morton	0–0	Dumbarton	Cappielow Park
				Attendance: 7,000; Referee: W Syme

2 March 1963 Division 2	Stranraer	5–5	Dumbarton	Stair Park
	McMillan 8'; Hanlon 26', 46'; Nelson 47'; McGill 66'		Carr 9'; Bowie 15'; Friel 52'; Hodgson 60'; McLeod 72'	Attendance: 1,200; Referee: A Kidd

9 March 1963 Division 2	East Fife	3–0	Dumbarton	Bayview Park, Methil
	Stewart 5', 70'; Duncan 84'			Attendance: 1,500; Referee: W Syme

13 March 1963 Division 2	East Stirling	3–1	Dumbarton	Firs Park
	Kemp 35', 77'; Cockburn		Halliday 79'

16 March 1963 Division 2	Dumbarton	2–3	St Johnstone	Boghead Park
	Harra 57'; Friel 67'		Ferguson, A 27'; Townsend 35'; Young 81'	Attendance: 1,000; Referee: J Stewart

20 March 1963 Division 2	Dumbarton	2–1	Stenhousemuir	Boghead Park
	Friel 62'; McLardy 80'		Rankin 75'	Referee: W Brittle

23 March 1963 Division 2	Hamilton	4–2	Dumbarton	Douglas Park
	McGill 9'; Hastings 14'; Forsyth 23'; Hutton 41' (pen.)		Hodgson 55'; McLeod 85'	Attendance: 2,000; Referee: A Cook

27 March 1963 Division 2	Dumbarton	2–2	East Stirling	Boghead Park
	Hodgson 11', 18'		Hamill 15' (pen.); Kemp 68'	Referee: J Elliott

30 March 1963 Division 2	Dumbarton	3–0	Stirling Albion	Boghead Park
	Howie 46', 80'; Halliday 57'			Attendance: 1,000; Referee: J Dearie

3 April 1963 Division 2	Dumbarton	4–3	Brechin City	Boghead Park
	Hodgson 14', 47', 72'; Halliday 70'		Trialist 4', 24'; Warrander 88'	Referee: J Dearie

6 April 1963 Division 2	Ayr United	2–0	Dumbarton	Somerset Park
	Harra 15' (o.g.); Jones 51'			Attendance: 400; Referee: W Brittle

10 April 1963 Division 2	Cowdenbeath	5–2	Dumbarton	Central Park, Cowdenbeath
	Matthew 2' (pen.) trialist Vincent; Fraser		Hodgson 53'; Halliday 85' (pen.)	Referee: A McKenzie

13 April 1963 Division 2	Dumbarton	3–1	Arbroath	Boghead Park
	Fraser 48'; Bowie 55'; Halliday 85'		Gillespie 60'	Attendance: 1,300; Referee: W Elliott

17 April 1963 Division 2	Dumbarton	3–0	Montrose	Boghead Park
	Halliday 10', 66', 81' (pen.)			Attendance: W Elliott

20 April 1963 Division 2	Forfar Athletic	3–4	Dumbarton	Station Park, Forfar
	Kitchenbrand 33'; Milne 64' (pen.); Kennedy 83'		Friel 21', 74'; Halliday 37' (pen.); Fraser 89'	Referee: J Gordon

24 April 1963 Division 2	Dumbarton	3–0	Berwick Rangers	Boghead Park
	Halliday 44', 56'; Friel 60'			Referee: H Phillips

27 April 1963 Division 2	Dumbarton	1–0	Cowdenbeath	Boghead Park
	Friel			Referee: H Phillips

== Scottish League Cup ==
The League Cup was to prove the bright spot of the season, and after 3 wins and a draw from their sectional ties, and a subsequent play off win over Cowdenbeath, Dumbarton were to lose a close quarter final encounter against Rangers, the highlight being a 1–1 draw at Ibrox.

11 August 1962 Group 9	Albion Rovers	3–5	Dumbarton	Cliftonhill Stadium
	Flannigan 77', 79'; McGuire 80'		Miller 11', 17'; Jardine 15'; Copeland; Black	Referee: D Weir

15 August 1962 Group 9	Dumbarton	1–1	Stenhousemuir	Boghead Park
	Miller 39'		Hannah	Referee: J Hamilton

18 August 1962 Group 9	Brechin City	3–5	Dumbarton	Glebe Park, Brechin
	Allan (52l), 67' (pen.); Hammell 88'		Govan 32', 40', 74'; Miller 54'; Carr 68'	Attendance: 1,000; Referee: J Gordon

25 August 1962 Group 9	Dumbarton	1–0	Forfar Athletic	Boghead Park
	Harra 27' (pen.)			Attendance: 3,000; Referee: J Paterson

3 September 1962 Playoff 1st leg	Dumbarton	0–0	Berwick Rangers	Boghead Park
				Referee: W Brittle

5 September 1962 Playoff 2nd leg	Berwick Rangers	1–2 (1–2 agg.)	Dumbarton	Shielfield Park
	McCulloch 15'		Miller 32', 62'	Attendance: 3,125; Referee: W Brittle

12 September 1962 QF 1st leg	Dumbarton	1–3	Rangers	Boghead Park
	Miller 42'		Millar 8'; Greig 39'; Wilson 48' (pen.)	Attendance: 17,500; Referee: F Crossley

19 September 1962 QF 2nd leg	Rangers	1–1 (4–2 agg.)	Dumbarton	Ibrox Park
	Greig 31'		Newlands 10'	Attendance: 19,000; Referee: F Crossley

== Scottish Cup ==
In the Scottish Cup, Dumbarton fell at the first hurdle for the fourth consecutive season, losing to Arbroath.

12 January 1963 Cup round 1	Arbroath	2–0	Dumbarton	Gayfield Park
	Gillespie 60'; Murray 74'			Attendance: 2,030; Referee: H Phillips

== Stirlingshire Cup ==
Dumbarton lost out to Falkirk in the first round of the county Cup.

9 October 1962 First Round	Falkirk	2–0	Dumbarton	Brockville Park
	Hunter 41' (pen.); Henderson 59'			Referee: A Webster

== Friendly ==
20 October 1962 Friendly	Ross County	1–1	Dumbarton	Victoria Park, Dingwall
	Jack 56'		Kilgannon 10'

== Player statistics ==
=== Squad ===
No.	Pos	Nat	Player	Total		Second Division		Scottish Cup		League Cup	
No.	Pos	Nat	Player	Apps	Goals	Apps	Goals	Apps	Goals	Apps	Goals
	GK	(Scotland) SCO	Maurice Crawford	16	0	12	0	0	0	4	0
	GK	(Scotland) SCO	Tommy Fleck	10	0	9	0	1	0	0	0
	GK	(Scotland) SCO	Doug Robertson	23	0	19	0	0	0	4	0
	DF	(Scotland) SCO	Alan Black	10	1	5	0	1	0	4	1
	DF	(Scotland) SCO	Tommy Govan	40	4	33	1	1	0	6	3
	DF	(Scotland) SCO	Andy Jardine	40	2	31	1	1	0	8	1
	MF	(Scotland) SCO	George Cameron	10	0	8	0	0	0	2	0
	MF	(Scotland) SCO	Alistair Campbell	13	0	6	0	1	0	6	0
	MF	(Scotland) SCO	Hugh Harra	42	2	33	1	1	0	8	1
	MF	(Scotland) SCO	Jim Kilgannon	34	3	27	3	1	0	6	0
	MF	(Scotland) SCO	John Newlands	12	2	9	1	0	0	3	1
	MF	(Scotland) SCO	John Walker	4	0	3	0	0	0	1	0
	MF	(Scotland) SCO	Joe Wilson	41	3	34	3	1	0	6	0
	FW	(Scotland) SCO	John Bain	4	3	4	3	0	0	0	0
	FW	(Scotland) SCO	Don Bowie	28	2	27	2	1	0	0	0
	FW	(Scotland) SCO	Tommy Campbell	6	0	2	0	0	0	4	0
	FW	(Scotland) SCO	Joe Carr	19	2	12	1	0	0	7	1
	FW	(Scotland) SCO	Jimmy Copeland	4	1	1	0	0	0	3	1
	FW	(Scotland) SCO	Jim Fraser	8	2	8	2	0	0	0	0
	FW	(Scotland) SCO	Benny Friel	20	8	20	8	0	0	0	0
	FW	(Scotland) SCO	Tommy Halliday	14	11	14	11	0	0	0	0
	FW	(Scotland) SCO	Jim Harley	1	0	1	0	0	0	0	0
	FW	(Scotland) SCO	Jimmy Hodgson	29	14	28	14	0	0	1	0
	FW	(Scotland) SCO	Willie Howie	5	2	4	2	1	0	0	0
	FW	(Scotland) SCO	Jimmy Madden	1	0	1	0	0	0	0	0
	FW	(Scotland) SCO	Jimmy McGraw	1	0	1	0	0	0	0	0
	FW	(Scotland) SCO	Dan McLardy	1	1	1	1	0	0	0	0
	FW	(Scotland) SCO	Eddie McLeod	7	4	6	4	1	0	0	0
	FW	(Scotland) SCO	Tom McQuade	1	0	1	0	0	0	0	0
	FW	(Scotland) SCO	Alistair Melvin	2	1	2	1	0	0	0	0
	FW	(Scotland) SCO	Jimmy Miller	26	11	18	4	0	0	8	7
	FW	(Scotland) SCO	Alec Morrison	13	0	11	0	0	0	2	0
	FW	(Scotland) SCO	Ian Russell	1	0	1	0	0	0	0	0
	FW	(Scotland) SCO	Pat Waters	5	2	5	2	0	0	0	0
	FW	(Scotland) SCO	Jackie Webb	8	0	3	0	0	0	5	0

=== Transfers ===
Amongst those players joining and leaving the club were the following:

==== Players in ====
Player	From	Date
(Scotland) Hugh Harra	(Scotland) Falkirk	31 Jul 1962
(Scotland) Joe Wilson	(Scotland) Albion Rovers	7 Aug 1962
(Scotland) Jimmy Hodgson	(Scotland) Irvine Meadow	17 Sep 1962
(Scotland) Don Bowie	(Scotland) Irvine Meadow	16 Oct 1962
(Scotland) Benny Friel	(Scotland) Vale of Leven	27 Nov 1962
(Scotland) Tommy Halliday	(Scotland) Largs Thistle	23 Mar 1963

==== Players out ====
Player	To	Date
(Scotland) Charlie Stewart	(Scotland) Stenhousemuir	25 May 1962
(Scotland) Jim Kilgannon	(Scotland) East Stirling	19 Mar 1963
(Scotland) Freddie Glidden	(Scotland) Freed	30 Apr 1963
(Scotland) Jackie Webb	(Scotland) Freed	30 Apr 1963
(Scotland) Hugh Gallacher	(Scotland) Retired	
(Scotland) Jimmy Miller	(Australia) Emigrated	

== Reserve team ==
For the second year running, Dumbarton played a team in the Combined Reserve League, finishing 3rd of 7, winning 10 and drawing 8 from 24 matches. In the Scottish Second XI Cup, Dumbarton lost in the first round to Queens Park, after a draw.
