= Alex Willoughby =

Scottish footballer

Personal information
- Full name: Alexander Willoughby
- Date of birth: 17 September 1944
- Place of birth: Springburn, Scotland
- Date of death: 14 July 2004 (aged 59)
- Position: Forward

Youth career
- Drumchapel Amateur
- 1959–1963: Rangers

Senior career*
| Years | Team | Apps | (Gls) |
| 1963–1969 | Rangers | 75 | (39) |
| 1969–1974 | Aberdeen | 104 | (10) |
| 1974–1975 | Hong Kong Rangers | 49 | (10) |

Managerial career
- 1980–1982: KA
- * Club domestic league appearances and goals

Alex Willoughby (17 September 1944 – 14 July 2004) was a Scottish professional football forward who played for Rangers and Aberdeen.

== Career ==
Willoughby was born in Springburn, Glasgow, and educated at Petershill Primary School and Colston Junior Secondary School, both located in the Springburn area. He played youth football with his local Boys' Brigade team, and then with Drumchapel Amateurs before commencing his career with Rangers as a schoolboy signing at 15 years of age in 1959. He subsequently signed professional terms with Rangers in 1961. He scored in the 1963 Scottish League Cup Final win over Morton, but was omitted from the 1967 European Cup Winners' Cup Final team to the surprise of many, with Roger Hynd preferred, despite Willoughby having scored 17 goals in 14 games in the three months prior.

He joined Aberdeen in 1969, and left Scotland in 1974 to play for Hong Kong Rangers, before spells in Australia and South Africa. He then coached Icelandic side KA.

== Personal life ==
His cousin was former Rangers and Aberdeen forward Jim Forrest. Willoughby played alongside Forrest at Drumchapel, Rangers, Aberdeen and Hong Kong Rangers. He died in 2004 from cancer, aged 59.

== Career statistics ==
=== Appearances and goals by club, season and competition ===
| Club | Season | League | | | National Cup | | League Cup | | Europe | | Total | |
| Club | Season | Division | Apps | Goals | Apps | Goals | Apps | Goals | Apps | Goals | Apps | Goals |
|---|---|---|---|---|---|---|---|---|---|---|---|---|
| Rangers | 1962-63 | Scottish Division One | 3 | 2 | 0 | 0 | 0 | 0 | 0 | 0 | 3 | 2 |
| Rangers | 1963-64 | Scottish Division One | 6 | 3 | 0 | 0 | 1 | 1 | 1 | 0 | 8 | 4 |
| Rangers | 1964-65 | Scottish Division One | 5 | 2 | 0 | 0 | 0 | 0 | 0 | 0 | 5 | 2 |
| Rangers | 1965-66 | Scottish Division One | 23 | 6 | 2 | 1 | 9 | 5 | 0 | 0 | 34 | 12 |
| Rangers | 1966-67 | Scottish Division One | 12 | 16 | 0 | 0 | 0 | 0 | 3 | 1 | 15 | 17 |
| Rangers | 1967-68 | Scottish Division One | 23 | 10 | 2 | 0 | 0 | 0 | 1 | 0 | 26 | 10 |
| Rangers | 1968-69 | Scottish Division One | 3 | 0 | 0 | 0 | 1 | 0 | 0 | 0 | 4 | 0 |
| Rangers | Total | | 75 | 39 | 4 | 1 | 11 | 6 | 5 | 1 | 95 | 47 |
| Aberdeen | 1969–70 | Scottish Division One | 19 | 0 | 1 | 0 | 6 | 1 | 0 | 0 | 26 | 1 |
| Aberdeen | 1970–71 | Scottish Division One | 19 | 2 | 4 | 0 | 1 | 0 | 1 | 0 | 25 | 2 |
| Aberdeen | 1971–72 | Scottish Division One | 29 | 7 | 3 | 1 | 6 | 2 | 4 | 0 | 42 | 10 |
| Aberdeen | 1972–73 | Scottish Division One | 25 | 1 | 1 | 0 | 9 | 0 | 2 | 1 | 37 | 2 |
| Aberdeen | 1973–74 | Scottish Division One | 11 | 0 | 0 | 0 | 5 | 0 | 3 | 0 | 19 | 0 |
| Aberdeen | Total | | 103 | 10 | 9 | 1 | 27 | 3 | 10 | 1 | 149 | 15 |
| Career total | | | 178 | 49 | 13 | 2 | 38 | 9 | 15 | 2 | 244 | 62 |
