= Craig Watson (footballer, born 1942) =

Scottish footballer

David Craig (Craigie)Watson
Personal information
- Full name: Craig Watson
- Date of birth: 12 January 1942
- Place of birth: Glasgow, Scotland
- Date of death: 7 November 2001 (aged 59)
- Place of death: Glasgow, Scotland
- Position: Winger

Senior career*
Years	Team	Apps	(Gls)
1959–1962	Arthurlie		
1962–1965	Rangers	13	(4)
1965–1966	Morton	34	(8)
1966–1967	Kilmarnock	30	(8)
1967–1970	Falkirk	81	(13)
1970–1972	Arcadia Shepherds		
1972–1973	Morton	7	(3)
1973	Highlands Park		
1974	Durban United		
1975	Berea Park		
1976	Durban City		
- * Club domestic league appearances and goals

Craig Watson (12 January 1942 – 7 November 2001) was a Scottish footballer who played as a winger for Rangers.

== Career ==
Watson was a member of the youngest Rangers forward line in the history of the club when he lined up alongside Willie Henderson, Alex Willoughby, Jim Forrest, and George McLean against Real Madrid in a European Cup match in the Bernabéu Stadium in 1963.

Watson's proudest achievement was playing in the 1963 Scottish League Cup Final when Rangers defeated Morton 5–0. He later transferred to Cappielow, spending several seasons playing under Hal Stewart.

Watson, who also had spells with Kilmarnock and Falkirk, eventually emigrated to South Africa, where he ended his playing career.

== Honours ==
Highlands Park

- NFL Cup: 1973
