= 1963 Scottish League Cup final =

- Event: 1963–64 Scottish League Cup
| Rangers | Morton |
| 5 | 0 |
- Date: 26 October 1963
- Venue: Hampden Park, Glasgow
- Attendance: 105,907

The 1963 Scottish League Cup final was played on 26 October 1963 at Hampden Park in Glasgow and it was the final of the 18th Scottish League Cup competition. The final was contested by Rangers and Morton, and Rangers won by a score of 5–0.

== Match details ==
26 October 1963

| Rangers | 5–0 | Greenock Morton |
|---|---|---|
| Willoughby (1); Forrest (4) |

Hampden Park, Glasgow
Attendance: 105,907

RANGERS:
| GK | Billy Ritchie |
| FB | Bobby Shearer (c) |
| FB | David Provan |
| RH | John Greig |
| CH | Ron McKinnon |
| LH | Jim Baxter |
| RW | Willie Henderson |
| IF | Alex Willoughby |
| CF | Jim Forrest |
| IF | Ralph Brand |
| LW | Craig Watson |
Manager:
Scot Symon

MORTON :
| GK | Alex Brown |
| FB | John Boyd |
| FB | Jimmy Mallon |
| RH | Jim Reilly (c) |
| CH | Jim Kiernan |
| LH | Hugh Strachan |
| RW | Bobby Adamson |
| IF | Bobby Campbell |
| CF | Morris Stevenson |
| IF | Allan McGraw |
| LW | Jimmy Wilson |
Manager:
Hal Stewart

== See also ==
Played between the same teams:

- 1922 Scottish Cup Final
- 1948 Scottish Cup Final
