= 1961–62 Celtic F.C. season =

Celtic
1961–62 season
- Manager: Jimmy McGrory
- Stadium: Celtic Park
- Scottish Division One: 3rd
- Scottish Cup: Semi-finalists
- Scottish League Cup: Group stage

During the 1961–62 Scottish football season, Celtic competed in Scottish Division One.

== Competitions ==
=== Scottish Division One ===
==== League table ====
Pos	Team	Pld	W	D	L	GF	GA	GR	Pts	Qualification or relegation
1	Dundee (C)	34	25	4	5	80	46	1.739	54	Qualified for the European Cup
2	Rangers	34	22	7	5	84	31	2.710	51	Qualified for the Cup Winners' Cup
3	Celtic	34	19	8	7	81	37	2.189	46	Invited for the Inter-Cities Fairs Cup
4	Dunfermline Athletic	34	19	5	10	77	46	1.674	43	Invited for the Inter-Cities Fairs Cup
5	Kilmarnock	34	16	10	8	74	58	1.276	42	

Source: RSSSF
(C) Champions

==== Matches ====
23 August 1961 Division One	Kilmarnock	3–2	Celtic	Kilmarnock
19:30 GMT				Stadium: Rugby Park; Attendance: 19,215

9 September 1961 Division One	Celtic	1–0	Third Lanark	Glasgow
15:00				Stadium: Celtic Park; Attendance: 27,108

16 September 1961 Division One	Rangers	2–2	Celtic	Glasgow
15:00				Stadium: Ibrox Park; Attendance: 74,267

23 September 1961 Division One	Celtic	3–1	Dundee United	Glasgow
15:00 GMT				Stadium: Celtic Park; Attendance: 23,379

30 September 1961 Division One	Falkirk	3–1	Celtic	Falkirk
15:00 BST				Stadium: Brockville Park; Attendance: 12,639

14 October 1961 Division One	Celtic	5–0	Stirling Albion	Glasgow
15:00 BST				Stadium: Celtic Park; Attendance: 21,431

18 October 1961 Division One	St Johnstone	0–3	Celtic	Perth
19:30 BST				Stadium: Muirton Park; Attendance: 6,257

21 October 1961 Division One	Hearts	2–1	Celtic	Edinburgh
15:00 BST				Stadium: Tynecastle Park; Attendance: 27,719

28 October 1961 Division One	Celtic	2–1	Dunfermline Athletic	Glasgow
15:00 BST				Stadium: Celtic Park; Attendance: 24,913

4 November 1961 Division One	Dundee	2–1	Celtic	Dundee
15:00 BST				Stadium: Dens Park; Attendance: 23,654

15 November 1961 Division One	Celtic	7–1	St Mirren	Glasgow
19:30 GMT				Stadium: Celtic Park; Attendance: 21,065

18 November 1961 Division One	Celtic	3–0	Airdrieonians	Glasgow
15:00 GMT				Stadium: Celtic Park; Attendance: 25,224

25 November 1961 Division One	Aberdeen	0–0	Celtic	Aberdeen
15:00 GMT				Stadium: Pittodrie Park; Attendance: 14,269

2 December 1961 Division One	Celtic	5–1	Partick Thistle	Glasgow
15:00 GMT				Stadium: Celtic Park; Attendance: 19,829

16 December 1961 Division One	Celtic	4–3	Hibernian	Glasgow
15:00 GMT				Stadium: Celtic Park; Attendance: 26,752

23 December 1961 Division One	Raith Rovers	0–4	Celtic	Kirkcaldy
15:00 GMT				Stadium: Stark's Park; Attendance: 8,804

6 January 1962 Division One	Celtic	2–2	Kilmarnock	Glasgow
15:00 GMT				Stadium: Celtic Park; Attendance: 33,940

10 January 1962 Division One	Third Lanark	1–1	Celtic	Glasgow
19:30 GMT				Stadium: Cathkin Park; Attendance: 18,439

13 January 1962 Division One	Dundee United	4–5	Celtic	Dundee
15:00 GMT				Stadium: Tannadice Park; Attendance: 14,476

20 January 1962 Division One	Celtic	3–0	Falkirk	Glasgow
15:00 GMT				Stadium: Celtic Park; Attendance: 25,652

22 January 1962 Division One	Celtic	1–1	Motherwell	Glasgow
15:00 GMT				Stadium: Celtic Park; Attendance: 21,597

3 February 1962 Division One	Celtic	3–1	St Johnstone	Glasgow
15:00 GMT				Stadium: Celtic Park; Attendance: 18,343

10 February 1962 Division One	Stirling Albion	1–0	Celtic	Stirling
15:00 GMT				Stadium: Annfield; Attendance: 11,515

21 February 1962 Division One	Celtic	2–2	Hearts	Glasgow
19:30 GMT				Stadium: Celtic Park; Attendance: 22,040

24 February 1962 Division One	Dunfermlie Athletic	0–3	Celtic	Dunfermline
15:00 GMT				Stadium: East End Park; Attendance: 13,904

3 March 1962 Division One	Celtic	2–1	Dundee	Glasgow
15:00 GMT				Stadium: Celtic Park; Attendance: 38,360

17 March 1962 Division One	Airdrieonians	1–0	Celtic	Airdrie
15:00 GMT				Stadium: Broomfield Park; Attendance: 15,7223

24 March 1962 Division One	Celtic	2–0	Aberdeen	Glasgow
15:00 GMT				Stadium: Celtic Park; Attendance: 20,191

26 March 1962 Division One	St Mirren	0–5	Celtic	Paisley
15:00 BST				Stadium: St Mirren Park, Love Street; Attendance: 18,258

4 April 1962 Division One	Partick Thistle	1–2	Celtic	Glasgow
19:30 GMT				Stadium: Firhill Park; Attendance: 7,252

7 April 1962 Division One	Hibernian	1–1	Celtic	Edinburgh
15:00 BST				Stadium: Easter Road; Attendance: 10,683

9 April 1962 Division One	Celtic	1–1	Rangers	Glasgow
19:30 BST				Stadium: Celtic Park; Attendance: 49,702

21 April 1962 Division One	Celtic	0–1	Raith Rovers	Glasgow
15:00 BST				Stadium: Celtic Park; Attendance: 10,565

23 April 1962 Division One	Motherwell	0–4	Celtic	Motherwell
19:30 BST				Stadium: Fir Park; Attendance: 8,351

=== Scottish Cup ===
13 December 1961 First round	Celtic	5–1	Cowdenbeath	Glasgow
19:30 GMT				Stadium: Celtic Park; Attendance: 19,000

27 January 1962 Second round	Morton	1–3	Celtic	Greenock
15:00 GMT				Stadium: Cappielow Park; Attendance: 20,100

17 February 1962 Third round	Hearts	3–4	Celtic	Edinburgh
15:00 GMT				Stadium: Tynecastle Park; Attendance: 35,045

10 March 1962 Fourth round	Celtic	4–4	Third Lanark	Glasgow
15:00 GMT				Stadium: Celtic Park; Attendance: 42,500

14 March 1962 Fourth round replay	Third Lanark	0–4	Celtic	Glasgow
15:00 GMT				Stadium: Hampden Park; Attendance: 51,518

31 March 1962 Semi-final	St Mirren	3–1	Celtic	Glasgow
15:00 GMT				Stadium: Ibrox Park; Attendance: 59,278

=== Scottish League Cup ===
12 August 1961 Group 8	Partick Thistle	2–3	Celtic	Glasgow
15:00 GMT				Stadium: Celtic Park; Attendance: 33,549

16 August 1961 Group 8	Celtic	0–1	St Johnstone	Glasgow
19:30 GMT				Stadium: Celtic Park; Attendance: 24,149

19 August 1961 Group 8	Hibernian	2–2	Celtic	Edinburgh
15:00 GMT				Stadium: Easter Road; Attendance: 23,925

26 August 1961 Group 8	Celtic	3–2	Partick Thistle	Glasgow
15:00 GMT				Stadium: Celtic Park; Attendance: 24,318

30 August 1961 Group 8	St Johnstone	2–0	Celtic	Perth
19:30 GMT				Stadium: Muirton Park; Attendance: 14,103

2 September 1961 Group 8	Celtic	2–1	Hibernian	Glasgow
15:00 GMT				Stadium: Celtic Park; Attendance: 29,972

=== Glasgow Cup ===
25 September 1961 1st round	Celtic	4–1	Queen's Park	Glasgow
19:30 BST				Stadium: Celtic Park

9 October 1961 Semi-final	Partick Thistle	1–5	Celtic	Glasgow
19:30 BST				Stadium: Firhill Park; Attendance: 28,500

4 May 1962 Final	Celtic	1–1	Third Lanark	Glasgow
14:30 BST				Stadium: Hampden Park

11 May 1962 Final replay	Celtic	3–2	Third Lanark	Glasgow
19:30 BST				Stadium: Celtic Park; Attendance: 12,000
