= 1961–62 Heart of Midlothian F.C. season =

Heart of Midlothian
1961–62 season
- Manager: Tommy Walker
- Stadium: Tynecastle Park
- Scottish First Division: 5th
- Scottish Cup: Round 3
- League Cup: Finalists

During the 1961–62 season Hearts competed in the Scottish First Division, the Scottish Cup, the Scottish League Cup and the East of Scotland Shield.

== Fixtures ==
=== Friendlies ===
13 November 1961 Friendly	Hearts	0–3	British Army	Tynecastle Park
	Goal			Attendance: 6,000

27 April 1962 Benefit Match	Duns	0–6	Hearts	Hawthorn Park
	Goal

7 May 1962 Friendly	Peterhead	0–5	Hearts	Recreation Park
	Goal			Attendance: 1,300

9 May 1962 Friendly	Inverness Select	0–6	Hearts	Inverness
	Goal

12 May 1962 Friendly	Ross County	0–5	Hearts	Victoria Park
	Goal

=== East of Scotland Shield ===
31 March 1962 Final	Hearts	3–1	Hibernian	Tynecastle Park

=== Inter-Cities Fairs Cup ===
27 September 1961 Inter-Cities Fairs Cup R1 1st Leg	Union Saint-Gilloise	1–3	Hearts	Stade Joseph Marien
			Goal	Attendance: 4,000

4 October 1961 Inter-Cities Fairs Cup R1 2nd Leg	Hearts	2–0	Union Saint-Gilloise	Tynecastle Park
			Goal	Attendance: 18,000

6 November 1961 Inter-Cities Fairs Cup R2 1st Leg	Hearts	0–1	Inter Milan	Tynecastle Park
			Goal	Attendance: 17,500

22 November 1961 Inter-Cities Fairs Cup R2 2nd Leg	Inter Milan	4–0	Hearts	San Siro
			Goal	Attendance: 12,000

=== League Cup ===
12 August 1961 League Cup Group	Hearts	1–0	Raith Rovers	Tynecastle Park
				Attendance: 17,264

16 August 1961 League Cup Group	Kilmarnock	1–2	Hearts	Rugby Park
				Attendance: 13,841

19 August 1961 League Cup Group	St Mirren	1–0	Hearts	St Mirren Park, Love Street
				Attendance: 18,255

26 August 1961 League Cup Group	Raith Rovers	3–1	Hearts	Stark's Park
				Attendance: 4,999

30 August 1961 League Cup Group	Hearts	2–0	Kilmarnock	Tynecastle Park
				Attendance: 17,035

2 September 1961 League Cup Group	Hearts	3–1	St Mirren	Tynecastle Park
				Attendance: 20,092

13 September 1961 League Cup Quarter-Final 1st Leg	Hamilton Academical	1–2	Hearts	Douglas Park
				Attendance: 5,620

20 September 1961 League Cup Quarter-Final 2nd Leg	Hearts	2–0	Hamilton Academical	Tynecastle Park
				Attendance: 9,835

11 October 1961 League Cup Semi-Final	Stirling Albion	1–2	Hearts	Easter Road
				Attendance: 18,789

28 October 1961 League Cup Final	Hearts	1–1	Rangers	Hampden Park
				Attendance: 88,635

18 December 1961 League Cup Final Replay	Hearts	1–3	Rangers	Hampden Park
				Attendance: 47,552

=== Scottish Cup ===
27 January 1962 Scottish Cup R2	Vale of Leithen	1–3	Hearts	Victoria Park
				Attendance: 3,716

17 February 1962 Scottish Cup R3	Hearts	3–4	Celtic	Tynecastle Park
				Attendance: 35,045

=== Scottish First Division ===
23 August 1961 Scottish First Division	Hearts	2–2	St Mirren	Tynecastle Park
				Attendance: 14,520

9 September 1961 Scottish First Division	Dunfermline Athletic	2–1	Hearts	East End Park
				Attendance: 10,830

16 September 1961 Scottish First Division	Hearts	4–2	Hibernian	Tynecastle Park
				Attendance: 23,022

23 September 1961 Scottish First Division	Dundee	2–0	Hearts	Tynecastle Park
				Attendance: 10,921

30 September 1961 Scottish First Division	Hearts	4–1	Airdrieonians	Tynecastle Park
				Attendance: 12,080

7 October 1961 Scottish First Division	Stirling Albion	3–1	Hearts	Annfield Stadium
				Attendance: 7,042

14 October 1961 Scottish First Division	Aberdeen	0–2	Hearts	Pittodrie Park
				Attendance: 10,489

21 October 1961 Scottish First Division	Hearts	2–1	Celtic	Tynecastle Park
				Attendance: 27,719

4 November 1961 Scottish First Division	St Johnstone	0–2	Hearts	Muirton Park
				Attendance: 9,432

11 November 1961 Scottish First Division	Hearts	2–0	Partick Thistle	Tynecastle Park
				Attendance: 11,027

25 November 1961 Scottish First Division	Raith Rovers	0–1	Hearts	Stark's Park
				Attendance: 3,549

2 December 1961 Scottish First Division	Hearts	2–6	Motherwell	Tynecastle Park
				Attendance: 11,882

16 December 1961 Scottish First Division	Hearts	3–3	Kilmarnock	Tynecastle Park
				Attendance: 11,225

23 December 1961 Scottish First Division	Falkirk	0–2	Hearts	Brockville Park
				Attendance: 5,897

6 January 1962 Scottish First Division	St Mirren	0–1	Hearts	St Mirren Park, Love Street
				Attendance: 8,996

10 January 1962 Scottish First Division	Rangers	2–1	Hearts	Ibrox Park
				Attendance: 28,107

13 January 1962 Scottish First Division	Hearts	0–2	Dundee	Tynecastle Park
				Attendance: 17,981

17 January 1962 Scottish First Division	Hibernian	1–4	Hearts	Easter Road
				Attendance: 15,277

20 January 1962 Scottish First Division	Airdrieonians	2–3	Hearts	Broomfield Park
				Attendance: 5,250

24 January 1962 Scottish First Division	Hearts	2–1	Dundee United	Tynecastle Park
				Attendance: 13,591

31 January 1962 Scottish First Division	Hearts	3–2	Dunfermline Athletic	Tynecastle Park
				Attendance: 12,368

3 February 1962 Scottish First Division	Hearts	0–0	Stirling Albion	Tynecastle Park
				Attendance: 9,161

7 February 1962 Scottish First Division	Hearts	2–1	Third Lanark	Tynecastle Park
				Attendance: 11,279

10 February 1962 Scottish First Division	Hearts	1–1	Aberdeen	Tynecastle Park
				Attendance: 13,703

21 February 1962 Scottish First Division	Celtic	2–2	Hearts	Celtic Park
				Attendance: 22,040

24 February 1962 Scottish First Division	Hearts	0–1	Rangers	Tynecastle Park
				Attendance: 30,004

3 March 1962 Scottish First Division	Hearts	1–1	St Johnstone	Tynecastle Park
				Attendance: 5,394

10 March 1962 Scottish First Division	Partick Thistle	3–1	Hearts	Firhill Park
				Attendance: 9,500

17 March 1962 Scottish First Division	Third Lanark	1–0	Hearts	Tynecastle Park
				Attendance: 4,696

24 March 1962 Scottish First Division	Hearts	0–1	Raith Rovers	Tynecastle Park
				Attendance: 6,465

2 April 1962 Scottish First Division	Motherwell	1–2	Hearts	Fir Park
				Attendance: 2,320

7 April 1962 Scottish First Division	Kilmarnock	2–0	Hearts	Rugby Park
				Attendance: 6,750

21 April 1962 Scottish First Division	Hearts	2–3	Falkirk	Tynecastle Park
				Attendance: 6,925

28 April 1962 Scottish First Division	Dundee United	0–1	Hearts	Tannadice Park
				Attendance: 3,795

== See also ==
- List of Heart of Midlothian F.C. seasons
