= Hal Stewart =

Hal Stewart may refer to:

- Hal Stewart (Masked Rider), fictional character in the US television series
- Hal Stewart (Megamind), fictional character in the 2010 film
- Hal Stewart (football manager), former manager of Greenock Morton F.C., Scotland
