= Don Bowie =

Don Bowie may refer to:

- Don Bowie (climber) (born 1969), Canadian professional high altitude climber
- Don Bowie (footballer) (born 1940), Scottish footballer
