= Jim Forrest (footballer, born 1944) =

Scottish footballer (1944–2023)

Personal information
- Full name: James Forrest
- Date of birth: 22 September 1944
- Place of birth: Glasgow, Scotland
- Date of death: 27 September 2023 (aged 79)
- Position: Striker

Senior career*
Years	Team	Apps	(Gls)
1962–1967	Rangers	105	(83)
1967–1968	Preston North End	24	(3)
1968–1973	Aberdeen	128	(44)
1973	Cape Town City		
1974–1975	Hong Kong Rangers	16	(9)
1975–1976	San Antonio Thunder	5	(0)
1975	→ Hawick Royal Albert (loan)	2	(0)
Total		280	(139)

International career
1965–1971	Scotland	5	(0)
1963–1965	Scotland under-23	2	(0)
- * Club domestic league appearances and goals

James Forrest (22 September 1944 – 27 September 2023) was a Scottish professional footballer who played as a striker for Rangers, Preston, Aberdeen and Hong Kong Rangers.

== Club career ==
James Forrest was born in Glasgow, raised in the Royston district of the city and signed for Rangers (the club he supported) as a schoolboy; he was sent for a short period to Drumchapel Amateurs for development. In coming into the first-team, he displaced Jimmy Millar as the successful early 1960s Rangers side was breaking up.

Forrest was known as a prolific goalscorer – in total scoring 145 goals in his 163 games for Rangers, his 50th goal for the club coming in his 45th appearance. He scored 57 goals in the 1964–65 season, just two short of Jimmy McGrory of Celtic who holds the record of most goals scored in a season in British football. Forrest holds the record for number of goals scored for Rangers in a League Cup match, scoring five in an 8–0 victory over Stirling Albion in August 1966. Other highlights included two goals in his first Old Firm appearance in 1963 (when he was aged just 18), four in the 1963 Scottish League Cup Final win over Morton, both goals in the 1964 Scottish League Cup Final victory over Celtic, and another five-goal haul against Hamilton in a 1965 league game.

His Rangers career came to an end shortly after the infamous Scottish Cup defeat to Berwick Rangers in January 1967. He and George McLean were deemed entirely to blame, and both were dropped by manager Scot Symon and transferred within weeks.

After spending a year at Preston, he had a five-year stint at Aberdeen, where he received a Scottish Cup winner's medal in 1970, before transferring to Hong Kong Rangers in 1973.

== International career ==
Forrest played five times for Scotland between 1965 and 1971, but did not score. He had also featured for the Under-23 side.

== Personal life and death ==
Forrest's cousin, Alex Willoughby, was also a professional footballer. The two were team-mates at Drumchapel, Rangers, Aberdeen and Hong Kong Rangers.

Jim Forrest died on 27 September 2023, at the age of 79.

== Career statistics ==
=== Club ===
Appearances and goals by club season and competition
Club	Seasons	League			National cup		League cup		Europe		Total	
Club	Seasons	Division	Apps	Goals	Apps	Goals	Apps	Goals	Apps	Goals	Apps	Goals
Rangers	1962–63	Scottish Division One	4	0	0	0	0	0	0	0	4	0
Rangers	1963–64	Scottish Division One	24	21	2	2	10	16	2	0	38	39
Rangers	1964–65	Scottish Division One	30	30	3	3	10	17	7	6	50	56
Rangers	1965–66	Scottish Division One	30	24	4	1	10	10	0	0	44	35
Rangers	1966–67	Scottish Division One	17	8	1	0	7	6	2	0	27	14
Rangers	Total		105	83	10	6	37	49	11	6	163	144
Preston North End	1966–67	Second Division	8	3							8+	3+
Preston North End	1967–68	Second Division	16	0							16+	0+
Preston North End	Total		24	3							24+	3+
Aberdeen	1968–69	Scottish Division One	31	16	6	3	6	3	4	1	47	23
Aberdeen	1969–70	Scottish Division One	32	15	5	1	8	2	0	0	45	18
Aberdeen	1970–71	Scottish Division One	32	8	4	3	6	1	2	0	44	12
Aberdeen	1971–72	Scottish Division One	22	4	2	0	3	1	4	1	31	6
Aberdeen	1972–73	Scottish Division One	11	1	3	1	4	1	1	0	19	3
Aberdeen	Total		128	44	20	8	27	8	11	2	186	62
Cape Town City	1973	NFL										
Hong Kong Rangers	1973–74	Hong Kong First Division		3								3+
Hong Kong Rangers	1974–75	Hong Kong First Division		6								6+
Hong Kong Rangers	Total		16	9							16+	9+
San Antonio Thunder	1975	North American Soccer League	4	0	0	0	0	0	0	0	4	0
San Antonio Thunder	1976	North American Soccer League	1	0	0	0	0	0	0	0	1	0
San Antonio Thunder	Total		5	0	0	0	0	0	0	0	5	0
Career total			278+	139+	30+	14+	64+	57+	22	8	394+	218+

=== International ===
Appearances and goals by national team and year
National team	Year	Apps	Goals
Scotland	1965	2	0
Scotland	1966	—	
Scotland	1967	—	
Scotland	1968	—	
Scotland	1969	—	
Scotland	1970	—	
Scotland	1971	3	0
Total		5	0
