= 1963–64 Rangers F.C. season =

Rangers
1963–64 season
- Chairman: John Lawrence
- Manager: Scot Symon
- Ground: Ibrox Park
- Scottish League Division One: 1st P34 W25 D5 L4 F85 A31 Pts55
- Scottish Cup: Winners
- League Cup: Winners
- European Cup: First round
- Top goalscorer: League: Jim Forrest (??); All: Jim Forrest (39)

The 1963–64 season was the 84th season of competitive football by Rangers.

== Overview ==
Rangers played a total of 52 competitive matches during the 1963–64 season.

== Results ==
All results are written with Rangers' score first.

=== Scottish First Division ===
Date	Opponent	Venue	Result	Attendance	Scorers
21 August 1963	Dundee	A	1–1	34,500	Brand (pen.)
7 September 1963	Celtic	H	2–1	75,000	McLean, Brand
14 September 1963	Partick Thistle	A	3–0	35,000	Forrest (3)
21 September 1963	Hibernian	H	5–0	50,000	McLean, Brand (2) Forrest, Henderson
28 September 1963	Third Lanark	A	5–0	25,000	Forrest (4) Baxter
5 October 1963	Falkirk	H	4–0	25,000	McLean (3) Henderson
12 October 1963	St Mirren	A	3–0	25,000	Brand, Willoughby, Forrest
19 October 1963	East Stirlingshire	H	3–1	20,000	Watson, Forrest (2)
30 October 1963	Queen of the South	H	2–0	15,000	Forrest, Brand
2 November 1963	Airdrieonians	A	4–0	20,000	Willoughby, Forrest, Baxter, Watson
9 November 1963	Aberdeen	H	0–0	34,000	
16 November 1963	Kilmarnock	A	1–1	30,000	Brand (pen.)
23 November 1963	Dunfermline Athletic	A	4–1	21,000	Watson (2) Henderson, Forrest
30 November 1963	Heart of Midlothian	H	0–3	24,000	
7 December 1963	Dundee United	A	3–2	20,000	McLean (2) Brand
14 December 1963	Motherwell	A	3–3	16,500	Provan (pen.) Greig, Brand
21 December 1963	St Johnstone	H	2–3	14,000	Brand, Provan (pen.)
28 December 1963	Dundee	H	2–1	43,000	Forrest, Provan (pen.)
1 January 1964	Celtic	A	1–0	65,176	Millar
2 January 1964	Partick Thistle	H	4–3	30,000	Brand (2) Greig, Millar
4 January 1964	Hibernian	A	1–0	18,000	Millar
18 January 1964	Third Lanark	H	2–1	17,000	Brand (2)
1 February 1964	Falkirk	A	1–0	16,000	Brand
8 February 1964	St Mirren	H	2–3	25,000	Millar, Wilson
19 February 1964	East Stirlingshire	A	5–0	6,000	Wilson (2) Forrest (2) Millar (o.g.)
22 February 1964	Queen of the South	A	4–1	9,500	Forrest (2) Wilson, Willoughby
29 February 1964	Airdrieonians	H	4–1	26,500	Baxter (pen.) Greig, Forrest (2)
11 March 1964	Aberdeen	A	1–1	22,000	Baxter (pen.)
14 March 1964	Kilmarnock	H	2–0	46,000	McLean, Wilson
21 March 1964	Dunfermline Athletic	H	2–1	30,000	Wilson, McMillan
1 April 1964	Heart of Midlothian	A	2–1	Att. N/A	Brand, Millar
4 April 1964	Dundee United	H	2–0	28,000	Brand, McLean
18 April 1964	Motherwell	H	5–1	39,000	Greig, Brand (2) Millar, McLean
29 April 1964	St Johnstone	A	0–1	12,000	

=== Scottish Cup ===
Date	Round	Opponent	Venue	Result	Attendance	Scorers
11 January 1964	R1	Stenhousemuir	A	5–1	10,384	Millar, Greig (2) Provan (pen.), Brand
25 January 1964	R2	Duns	H	9–0	17,350	Millar (4) Brand (3) McLean, Henderson
15 February 1964	R3	Partick Thistle	H	3–0	60,421	Wilson (2) Forrest
7 March 1964	QF	Celtic	H	2–0	84,724	Forrest, Henderson
28 March 1964	SF	Dunfermline Athletic	N	1–0	67,823	Wilson
25 April 1964	F	Dundee	N	3–1	120,982	Millar (2) Brand

=== League Cup ===
Date	Round	Opponent	Venue	Result	Attendance	Scorers
10 August 1963	SR	Celtic	A	3–0	60,000	Forrest (2) McLean
14 August 1963	SR	Queen of the South	H	5–2	30,800	McLean, Wilson (2) Forrest, Provan
17 August 1963	SR	Kilmarnock	A	4–1	35,000	Henderson, McLean, Brand (2)
24 August 1963	SR	Celtic	H	3–0	65,102	Wilson, Brand (pen.) Forrest
28 August 1963	SR	Queen of the South	A	5–2	10,000	Forrest (4) Wilson
31 August 1963	SR	Kilmarnock	H	2–2	32,000	Wilson, Forrest
11 September 1963	QF1	East Fife	A	1–1	14,000	Forrest
18 September 1963	QF2	East Fife	H	2–0	25,000	Brand (pen.) Forrest
2 October 1963	SF	Berwick Rangers	N	3–1	16,000	Wilson, Brand, Forrest
26 October 1963	F	Morton	N	5–0	105,907	Forrest (4) Willoughby

=== European Cup ===
Date	Round	Opponent	Venue	Result	Attendance	Scorers
25 September 1963	PR1L1	Real Madrid	H	0–1	81,215	
9 October 1963	PR1L2	Real Madrid	A	0–6	90,000	

== See also ==
- 1963–64 in Scottish football
- 1963–64 Scottish Cup
- 1963–64 Scottish League Cup
- 1963–64 European Cup
