= Johnny Lawlor =

Scottish professional footballer (1937–2022)

Personal information
- Full name: John Boscoe Lawlor
- Date of birth: 30 January 1937
- Place of birth: Bellshill, Scotland
- Date of death: 22 November 2022 (aged 85)
- Place of death: Lanarkshire, Scotland
- Position: Left winger

Youth career
- Shettleston

Senior career*
Years	Team	Apps	(Gls)
1955–1959	Kilmarnock	9	(2)
1959–1961	Aldershot	57	(18)
1961–1963	Stirling Albion	53	(29)
1962	→ Hamilton Steelers		
1963–1964	Dumbarton	25	(7)
1964–1965	Falkirk	5	(1)
1964–1965	ES Clydebank	5	(1)
1965–1966	Alloa Athletic	26	(6)
1965–1967	East Fife	55	(21)
1967–1968	Stranraer	13	(0)
1968–1969	Hamilton Academical	18	(3)
Total		266	(88)
- * Club domestic league appearances and goals

John Boscoe Lawlor (30 January 1937 – 20 November 2022) was a Scottish professional footballer who played in the Football League as a left winger. He died in Lanarkshire, Scotland on 20 November 2022, at the age of 85.

He played the bulk of his career in the United Kingdom, but also played in Canada for the Hamilton Steelers
