= George Taggart =

Scottish footballer

Personal information
- Full name: George McGrory Taggart
- Date of birth: 26 February 1937 (age 89)
- Position: Wing half

Youth career
- Kilmarnock Amateurs

Senior career*
Years	Team	Apps	(Gls)
1955–1958	Kilmarnock	20	(0)
1958–1959	St Johnstone	1	(0)
1962–1963	Berwick Rangers	11	(0)
1963–1964	Dumbarton	27	(2)
- * Club domestic league appearances and goals

George McGrory Taggart (born 26 February 1937) was a Scottish footballer who played for Kilmarnock, St Johnstone, Berwick Rangers and Dumbarton.
