= Jimmy Copeland =

Scottish footballer

Personal information
- Full name: Jimmy Copeland
- Date of birth: 23 August 1941
- Place of birth: Kirkconnel, Dumfriesshire
- Date of death: 22 July 2018 (aged 76)
- Place of death: Sanquhar, Dumfriesshire
- Height: 5 ft 6 in (1.68 m)
- Position: Forward

Senior career*
Years	Team	Apps	(Gls)
1959–1962	Kilmarnock	6	(0)
1962–1963	Dumbarton	1	(0)
1962–1963	Montrose	8	(2)
1963–1964	Clyde	7	(1)
Total		22	(3)
- * Club domestic league appearances and goals

Jimmy Copeland (23 August 1941 – 23 July 2018) was a Scottish footballer, who played for Kilmarnock, Dumbarton, Montrose and Clyde in the Scottish Football League.

Copeland died in July 2018, aged 76.
