= Ronnie Curran =

Scottish footballer

Personal information
- Date of birth: 14 December 1940 (age 85)
- Position: Centre half

Youth career
- Port Glasgow Rangers

Senior career*
Years	Team	Apps	(Gls)
1963–1969	Dumbarton	157	(1)
- * Club domestic league appearances and goals

Ronnie Curran (born 14 December 1940) was a Scottish footballer who played 'junior' for Irvine Meadow before joining Dumbarton, where he was a constant in the half back line for six seasons.
