= 1963–64 Scottish League Cup =

Tournament details
- Country: Scotland
- Teams: 37

Final positions
- Champions: Rangers
- Runners-up: Morton

Tournament statistics
- Matches played: 120
- Goals scored: 438 (3.65 per match)

The 1963–64 Scottish League Cup was the 18th season of Scotland's second football knockout competition. The competition was won Rangers, who defeated Morton in the Final.

== First round ==
=== Group 1 ===
Team	Pld	W	D	L	GF	GA	GR	Pts
Motherwell	6	5	1	0	17	0	—	11
Heart of Midlothian	6	2	3	1	13	9	1.444	7
Partick Thistle	6	1	3	2	9	12	0.750	5
Falkirk	6	0	1	5	6	24	0.250	1

Home team	Score	Away team	Date
Heart of Midlothian	6–2	Falkirk	10 August 1963
Partick Thistle	0–2	Motherwell	10 August 1963
Falkirk	2–2	Partick Thistle	14 August 1963
Motherwell	3–0	Heart of Midlothian	14 August 1963
Falkirk	0–6	Motherwell	17 August 1963
Partick Thistle	2–2	Heart of Midlothian	17 August 1963
Falkirk	0–3	Heart of Midlothian	24 August 1963
Motherwell	2–0	Partick Thistle	24 August 1963
Heart of Midlothian	0–0	Motherwell	28 August 1963
Partick Thistle	3–2	Falkirk	28 August 1963
Heart of Midlothian	2–2	Partick Thistle	31 August 1963
Motherwell	4–0	Falkirk	31 August 1963

=== Group 2 ===
Team	Pld	W	D	L	GF	GA	GR	Pts
Hibernian	6	4	2	0	15	7	2.143	10
Aberdeen	6	2	3	1	10	7	1.429	7
Dundee United	6	2	1	3	11	14	0.786	5
St Mirren	6	0	2	4	7	15	0.467	2

Home team	Score	Away team	Date
Dundee United	1–1	Aberdeen	10 August 1963
St Mirren	1–1	Hibernian	10 August 1963
Aberdeen	2–2	St Mirren	14 August 1963
Hibernian	3–2	Dundee United	14 August 1963
Hibernian	2–2	Aberdeen	17 August 1963
St Mirren	2–3	Dundee United	17 August 1963
Aberdeen	2–0	Dundee United	24 August 1963
Hibernian	3–0	St Mirren	24 August 1963
Dundee United	2–4	Hibernian	28 August 1963
St Mirren	0–3	Aberdeen	28 August 1963
Aberdeen	0–2	Hibernian	31 August 1963
Dundee United	3–2	St Mirren	31 August 1963

=== Group 3 ===
Team	Pld	W	D	L	GF	GA	GR	Pts
Dundee	6	5	0	1	16	12	1.333	10
Dunfermline Athletic	6	3	0	3	13	13	1.000	6
Third Lanark	6	3	0	3	11	13	0.846	6
Airdrieonians	6	1	0	5	10	12	0.833	2

Home team	Score	Away team	Date
Airdrieonians	0–1	Dunfermline Athletic	10 August 1963
Third Lanark	1–2	Dundee	10 August 1963
Dundee	2–1	Airdrieonians	14 August 1963
Dunfermline Athletic	2–3	Third Lanark	14 August 1963
Airdrieonians	2–3	Third Lanark	17 August 1963
Dundee	4–1	Dunfermline Athletic	17 August 1963
Dundee	3–2	Third Lanark	24 August 1963
Dunfermline Athletic	3–2	Airdrieonians	24 August 1963
Airdrieonians	4–1	Dundee	28 August 1963
Third Lanark	0–3	Dunfermline Athletic	28 August 1963
Dunfermline Athletic	3–4	Dundee	31 August 1963
Third Lanark	2–1	Airdrieonians	31 August 1963

=== Group 4 ===
Team	Pld	W	D	L	GF	GA	GR	Pts
Rangers	6	5	1	0	22	7	3.143	11
Kilmarnock	6	2	2	2	9	9	1.000	6
Celtic	6	2	2	2	6	9	0.667	6
Queen of the South	6	0	1	5	8	20	0.400	1

Home team	Score	Away team	Date
Celtic	0–3	Rangers	10 August 1963
Queen of the South	1–4	Kilmarnock	10 August 1963
Kilmarnock	0–0	Celtic	14 August 1963
Rangers	5–2	Queen of the South	14 August 1963
Celtic	1–1	Queen of the South	17 August 1963
Kilmarnock	1–4	Rangers	17 August 1963
Kilmarnock	2–0	Queen of the South	24 August 1963
Rangers	3–0	Celtic	24 August 1963
Celtic	2–0	Kilmarnock	28 August 1963
Queen of the South	2–5	Rangers	28 August 1963
Queen of the South	2–3	Celtic	31 August 1963
Rangers	2–2	Kilmarnock	31 August 1963

=== Group 5 ===
Team	Pld	W	D	L	GF	GA	GR	Pts
Stirling Albion	6	4	1	1	16	11	1.455	9
Albion Rovers	6	4	0	2	10	7	1.429	8
Cowdenbeath	6	2	0	4	8	11	0.727	4
Alloa Athletic	6	1	1	4	7	12	0.583	3

Home team	Score	Away team	Date
Cowdenbeath	2–3	Albion Rovers	10 August 1963
Stirling Albion	3–3	Alloa Athletic	10 August 1963
Albion Rovers	3–2	Stirling Albion	14 August 1963
Alloa Athletic	1–2	Cowdenbeath	14 August 1963
Alloa Athletic	0–2	Albion Rovers	17 August 1963
Cowdenbeath	1–2	Stirling Albion	17 August 1963
Albion Rovers	2–0	Cowdenbeath	24 August 1963
Alloa Athletic	2–4	Stirling Albion	24 August 1963
Cowdenbeath	1–0	Alloa Athletic	28 August 1963
Stirling Albion	2–0	Albion Rovers	28 August 1963
Albion Rovers	0–1	Alloa Athletic	31 August 1963
Stirling Albion	3–2	Cowdenbeath	31 August 1963

=== Group 6 ===
Team	Pld	W	D	L	GF	GA	GR	Pts
Morton	6	6	0	0	20	4	5.000	12
Clyde	6	3	0	3	14	14	1.000	6
Stranraer	6	2	0	4	6	15	0.400	4
Ayr United	6	1	0	5	10	17	0.588	2

Home team	Score	Away team	Date
Ayr United	0–1	Morton	10 August 1963
Stranraer	0–2	Clyde	10 August 1963
Clyde	3–4	Ayr United	14 August 1963
Morton	5–0	Stranraer	14 August 1963
Morton	3–1	Clyde	17 August 1963
Stranraer	2–1	Ayr United	17 August 1963
Clyde	4–1	Stranraer	24 August 1963
Morton	5–2	Ayr United	24 August 1963
Ayr United	2–4	Clyde	28 August 1963
Stranraer	1–2	Morton	28 August 1963
Ayr United	1–2	Stranraer	31 August 1963
Clyde	0–4	Morton	31 August 1963

=== Group 7 ===
Team	Pld	W	D	L	GF	GA	GR	Pts
St Johnstone	6	5	0	1	16	5	3.200	10
East Stirlingshire	6	5	0	1	10	6	1.667	10
Hamilton Academical	6	1	0	5	6	14	0.429	2
Queen's Park	6	1	0	5	2	9	0.222	2

Home team	Score	Away team	Date
East Stirlingshire	2–0	Queen's Park	10 August 1963
Hamilton Academical	2–3	St Johnstone	10 August 1963
Queen's Park	2–1	Hamilton Academical	14 August 1963
St Johnstone	3–1	East Stirlingshire	14 August 1963
Hamilton Academical	2–3	East Stirlingshire	17 August 1963
Queen's Park	0–3	St Johnstone	17 August 1963
Queen's Park	0–1	East Stirlingshire	24 August 1963
St Johnstone	5–0	Hamilton Academical	24 August 1963
East Stirlingshire	2–1	St Johnstone	28 August 1963
Hamilton Academical	1–0	Queen's Park	28 August 1963
East Stirlingshire	1–0	Hamilton Academical	31 August 1963
St Johnstone	1–0	Queen's Park	31 August 1963

=== Group 8 ===
Team	Pld	W	D	L	GF	GA	GR	Pts
East Fife	6	4	2	0	15	6	2.500	10
Arbroath	6	3	2	1	10	9	1.111	8
Dumbarton	6	2	1	3	11	11	1.000	5
Raith Rovers	6	0	1	5	5	15	0.333	1

Home team	Score	Away team	Date
Arbroath	1–1	Dumbarton	10 August 1963
Raith Rovers	1–1	East Fife	10 August 1963
Dumbarton	3–0	Raith Rovers	14 August 1963
East Fife	3–0	Arbroath	14 August 1963
Dumbarton	2–3	East Fife	17 August 1963
Raith Rovers	3–4	Arbroath	17 August 1963
Dumbarton	1–2	Arbroath	24 August 1963
East Fife	3–0	Raith Rovers	24 August 1963
Arbroath	1–1	East Fife	28 August 1963
Raith Rovers	1–2	Dumbarton	28 August 1963
Arbroath	2–0	Raith Rovers	31 August 1963
East Fife	4–2	Dumbarton	31 August 1963

=== Group 9 ===
Team	Pld	W	D	L	GF	GA	GR	Pts
Berwick Rangers	4	3	0	1	11	7	1.571	6
Montrose	4	2	1	1	9	6	1.500	5
Stenhousemuir	4	1	2	1	8	9	0.889	4
Brechin City	4	0	3	1	7	10	0.700	3
Forfar Athletic	4	0	2	2	7	10	0.700	2

Home team	Score	Away team	Date
Montrose	3–0	Berwick Rangers	10 August 1963
Stenhousemuir	2–2	Forfar Athletic	10 August 1963
Brechin City	1–1	Stenhousemuir	14 August 1963
Forfar Athletic	1–2	Montrose	14 August 1963
Berwick Rangers	4–1	Brechin City	17 August 1963
Montrose	2–3	Stenhousemuir	17 August 1963
Berwick Rangers	3–1	Forfar Athletic	24 August 1963
Brechin City	2–2	Montrose	24 August 1963
Forfar Athletic	3–3	Brechin City	31 August 1963
Stenhousemuir	2–4	Berwick Rangers	31 August 1963

== Supplementary round ==
=== First leg ===
Home team	Score	Away team	Date
St Johnstone	2–2	Berwick Rangers	2 September 1963

=== Second leg ===
Home team	Score	Away team	Date	Agg
Berwick Rangers	4–2	St Johnstone	4 September 1963	6–4

== Quarter-finals ==
=== First leg ===
Home team	Score	Away team	Date
Dundee	3–3	Hibernian	11 September 1963
East Fife	1–1	Rangers	11 September 1963
Motherwell	0–0	Morton	11 September 1963
Stirling Albion	2–2	Berwick Rangers	11 September 1963

=== Second leg ===
Home team	Score	Away team	Date	Agg
Berwick Rangers	4–3	Stirling Albion	18 September 1963	6–5
Hibernian	2–0	Dundee	18 September 1963	5–3
Morton	2–0	Motherwell	18 September 1963	2–0
Rangers	2–0	East Fife	18 September 1963	3–1

== Semi-finals ==
=== Ties ===
Home team	Score	Away team	Date
Rangers	3–1	Berwick Rangers	2 October 1963
Morton	1–1	Hibernian	7 October 1963

=== Replay ===
Home team	Score	Away team	Date
Morton	1–0	Hibernian	14 October 1963

== Final ==
26 October 1963

Rangers	5 – 0	Greenock Morton
Willoughby; Forrest

Hampden Park, Glasgow
Attendance: 105,907
