= Pat Waters =

Scottish footballer

Personal information
- Full name: Patrick Grant Waters
- Date of birth: 12 May 1943
- Date of death: April 2008 (aged 64)
- Place of death: Stirlingshire, Scotland
- Position: Forward

Youth career
- Glenboig St Josephs

Senior career*
Years	Team	Apps	(Gls)
1959–19610	Stirling Albion	2	(0)
1961–1962	Stranraer	6	(0)
1962–1963	Forfar Athletic		
1962–1963	Dumbarton	5	(2)
1963–1965	Stenhousemuir	47	(8)
1965–1967	East Stirling	56	(7)
- * Club domestic league appearances and goals

Patrick Grant Waters (12 May 1943 – April 2008) was a Scottish footballer who played for Stirling Albion, Stranraer, Forfar Athletic, Dumbarton, Stenhousemuir and East Stirling.
