= 1961–62 Scottish Division One =

56th season of top-tier football league in Scotland

Scottish Division One
- Season: 1961–62
- Champions: Dundee
- Relegated: St Johnstone; Stirling Albion

The 1961–62 Scottish Division One was won by Dundee by three points over nearest rival Rangers. It is the only Scottish League title win in Dundee's history. St Johnstone and Stirling Albion finished 17th and 18th respectively and were relegated to the 1962-63 Second Division. St Johnstone were relegated on goal average, with the teams in 15th, 16th and 17th all finishing on 25 points.

== League table ==
Pos	Team	Pld	W	D	L	GF	GA	GR	Pts	Qualification or relegation
1	Dundee (C)	34	25	4	5	80	46	1.739	54	Qualified for the European Cup
2	Rangers	34	22	7	5	84	31	2.710	51	Qualified for the Cup Winners' Cup
3	Celtic	34	19	8	7	81	37	2.189	46	Invited for the Inter-Cities Fairs Cup
4	Dunfermline Athletic	34	19	5	10	77	46	1.674	43	Invited for the Inter-Cities Fairs Cup
5	Kilmarnock	34	16	10	8	74	58	1.276	42	
6	Hearts	34	16	6	12	55	49	1.122	38	
7	Partick Thistle	34	16	3	15	60	55	1.091	35	
8	Hibernian	34	14	5	15	58	72	0.806	33	Invited for the Inter-Cities Fairs Cup
9	Motherwell	34	13	6	15	65	62	1.048	32	
10	Dundee United	34	13	6	15	70	71	0.986	32	
11	Third Lanark	34	13	5	16	59	60	0.983	31	
12	Aberdeen	34	10	9	15	60	73	0.822	29	
13	Raith Rovers	34	10	7	17	51	73	0.699	27	
14	Falkirk	34	11	4	19	45	68	0.662	26	
15	Airdrieonians	34	9	7	18	57	78	0.731	25	
16	St Mirren	34	10	5	19	52	80	0.650	25	
17	St Johnstone (R)	34	9	7	18	35	61	0.574	25	Relegated to the Second Division
18	Stirling Albion (R)	34	6	6	22	34	76	0.447	18	Relegated to the Second Division

Source: RSSSF
(C) Champions; (R) Relegated

== Results ==
Home \ Away	ABE	AIR	CEL	DND	DNU	DNF	FAL	HOM	HIB	KIL	MOT	PAR	RAI	RAN	STJ	STM	STI	THI
Aberdeen		1–1	0–0	3–1	1–3	1–4	2–2	0–2	1–2	3–3	3–0	1–3	3–3	1–0	1–1	3–1	7–0	2–1
Airdrieonians	7–1		1–0	1–2	3–3	3–1	2–3	2–3	4–2	0–2	2–1	1–0	2–4	2–5	2–2	3–1	0–1	0–2
Celtic	2–0	3–0		2–1	3–1	2–1	3–0	2–2	4–3	2–2	1–1	5–1	0–1	1–1	3–1	7–1	5–0	1–0
Dundee	2–1	5–1	2–1		4–1	1–2	2–1	2–0	1–0	5–3	1–3	3–2	5–4	0–0	2–1	2–0	2–2	2–1
Dundee United	2–2	3–3	4–5	1–2		3–2	4–1	0–1	4–0	1–2	1–1	3–5	4–2	2–3	3–0	3–1	2–0	3–0
Dunfermline Athletic	4–0	6–2	0–3	1–2	4–1		2–1	2–1	4–0	2–0	2–1	4–2	3–0	1–0	0–1	7–0	3–0	1–1
Falkirk	0–1	1–0	3–1	1–3	1–2	1–2		0–2	1–4	0–1	4–2	1–1	3–0	1–7	0–1	3–3	1–0	2–0
Heart of Midlothian	1–1	4–1	2–1	0–2	2–1	3–2	2–3		4–2	3–3	2–6	2–0	0–1	0–1	1–1	2–2	0–0	2–1
Hibernian	1–1	2–2	1–1	1–3	3–2	1–2	2–2	1–4		3–2	1–2	3–0	3–2	0–0	3–2	2–1	3–1	1–3
Kilmarnock	4–2	4–2	3–2	1–1	5–3	2–2	2–0	2–0	4–2		1–2	1–1	2–3	0–1	2–0	4–3	2–1	2–2
Motherwell	1–3	5–2	0–4	2–4	2–1	1–1	3–0	1–2	5–1	0–2		1–3	3–0	2–2	2–2	2–1	5–3	0–3
Partick Thistle	4–2	1–0	1–2	3–0	4–2	1–0	1–2	3–1	4–1	2–4	1–0		3–2	1–4	3–0	0–1	2–0	2–0
Raith Rovers	3–1	1–1	0–4	2–3	0–0	2–2	1–2	0–1	0–2	2–2	0–3	1–0		1–3	1–1	4–0	2–1	4–3
Rangers	2–4	4–0	2–2	1–5	0–1	1–0	4–0	2–1	3–0	1–1	2–1	2–1	6–0		2–0	4–0	4–1	3–0
St Johnstone	4–1	0–3	0–3	0–3	1–2	2–5	2–1	0–2	0–2	0–2	1–1	1–0	0–0	0–4		0–3	2–0	1–2
St Mirren	3–2	0–2	0–5	1–1	1–1	4–1	2–0	0–1	2–3	2–1	2–1	1–3	5–1	1–1	1–3		3–1	1–2
Stirling Albion	3–0	2–2	1–0	2–3	0–1	2–3	3–0	3–1	0–1	2–2	2–4	0–0	0–3	0–6	0–3	0–3		2–0
Third Lanark	3–5	3–0	1–1	1–3	7–2	1–1	1–4	1–0	1–2	3–1	2–1	4–2	2–1	0–3	1–2	5–2	1–1	

Legend: Blue = home team win; Yellow = draw; Red = away team win.
