= 1968–69 Rangers F.C. season =

Rangers
1968–69 season
- Chairman: John Lawrence
- Manager: David White
- Ground: Ibrox Park
- Scottish League Division One: 2nd P34 W21 D7 L6 F81 A32 Pts49
- Scottish Cup: Runners-up
- League Cup: Sectional round
- Inter-Cities Fairs Cup: Semi-finals
- Top goalscorer: League: Willie Johnston (18); All: Willie Johnston (23)

The 1968–69 season was the 89th season of competitive football by Rangers.

== Overview ==
Rangers played a total of 55 competitive matches during the 1968–69 season.

Forward Willie Johnston finished as Rangers Top Goalscorer with 28 goals (inc. Glasgow Cup games). Seven of his goals were scored at Ibrox Stadium, eight were scored at Parkhead. A brace in a 4–2 league win v Celtic 14 September was followed on 21 March with a hat-trick against Aberdeen in a 6–1 Scottish Cup tie. Three weeks later he returned to Parkhead on 11 April for a Glasgow Cup tie against Celtic and netted 3 more in a 4–3 victory. His eight goals there during the season resulted in him scoring more at Parkhead than Celtic's 2nd all-time top scorer Bobby Lennox.

Colin Stein was signed in a £100,000 Scottish record transfer deal from Hibernian on 31 October. His first three games for the club saw him score 3 (Arbroath 5–1),3 (Hibs 6–1) & 2 (Dundalk 3–0) in just eleven days.

== Results ==
All results are written with Rangers' score first.

=== Scottish First Division ===
| Date | Opponent | Venue | Result | Attendance | Scorers |
|---|---|---|---|---|---|
| 7 September 1968 | Partick Thistle | H | 2–0 | 30,000 | Sandy Jardine (78,88) |
| 14 September 1968 | Celtic | A | 4–2 | 75,008 | Örjan Persson (15) Willie Johnston (17,89), Andy Penman (65) |
| 21 September 1968 | Kilmarnock | H | 3–3 | 40,245 | Willie Johnston (65), Sandy Jardine (72), Willie Henderson (80) |
| 28 September 1968 | Hearts | A | 1–1 | 33,000 | Andy Penman (87) |
| 5 October 1968 | Falkirk | H | 2–1 | 30,078 | Örjan Persson (37), Willie Johnston (87) |
| 12 October 1968 | St Johnstone | A | 0–2 | 21,000 | |
| 19 October 1968 | Dunfermline Athletic | H | 3–0 | 35,732 | Örjan Persson (26), Sandy Jardine (45), Alex Ferguson (86) |
| 26 October 1968 | Aberdeen | H | 2–3 | 32,089 | Alex Ferguson (83), Willie Henderson (84) |
| 2 November 1968 | Arbroath | A | 5–1 | 9,653 | Willie Johnston (15,29) *Colin Stein (62,63,66) |
| 9 November 1968 | Hibernian | H | 6–1 | 50,109 | Willie Johnston(7), Colin Stein (21,55,60), Willie Henderson (58), Örjan Persson (83) |
| 16 November 1968 | St Mirren | A | 0–1 | 43,500 | |
| 23 November 1968 | Clyde | A | 1–1 | 12,000 | Colin Stein (53) |
| 30 November 1968 | Airdrieonians | H | 1–1 | 20,199 | Colin Stein (25) |
| 7 December 1968 | Raith Rovers | A | 3–0 | 15,000 | Alex MacDonald (47), Colin Stein (75), Bobby Watson (83) |
| 14 December 1968 | Dundee United | H | 2–1 | 30,648 | John Greig (37), Willie Johnston (57) |
| 28 December 1968 | Morton | A | 2–0 | 20,000 | Andy Penman (16), Willie Johnston (74) |
| 1 January 1969 | Partick Thistle | A | 2–0 | 24,000 | Willie Johnston (33), Colin Stein (70) |
| 2 January 1969 | Celtic | H | 1–0 | 85,349 | John Greig (60 Pen) |
| 4 January 1969 | Kilmarnock | A | 3–3 | 32,000 | Andy Penman (7), Beattie (o.g. 27) Örjan Persson (61) |
| 11 January 1969 | Hearts | H | 2–0 | 40,102 | Andy Penman (8), Willie Johnston (28) |
| 18 January 1969 | Falkirk | A | 3–0 | 22,000 | Willie Johnston (6) Andy Penman (75,83) |
| 1 February 1969 | St Johnstone | H | 3–0 | 28,007 | Andy Penman (20), Alex Ferguson (76), Willie Henderson (86) |
| 5 March 1969 | Hibernian | A | 2–1 | 30,000 | John Greig (34 Pen), Willie Johnston (90) |
| 8 March 1969 | St Mirren | H | 6–0 | 33,899 | Kaj Johansen (25), Dave Smith (38), John Greig (61 Pen), Alex Ferguson (73), Örjan Persson (79), Andy Penman (84) |
| 11 March 1969 | Arbroath | H | 2–0 | 18,303 | Örjan Persson (19), Andy Penman (68) |
| 15 March 1969 | Clyde | H | 6–0 | 35,020 | Dave Smith (3), Penman (30), Colin Stein (35,40,48), Alex Ferguson (45) |
| 24 March 1969 | Airdrieonians | A | 2–3 | 20,000 | Andy Penman (47), Caldwell (o.g. 85) |
| 29 March 1969 | Raith Rovers | H | 2–1 | 28,990 | Andy Penman (46), Willie Johnston (89) |
| 5 April 1969 | Dundee United | A | 1–2 | 20,000 | John Greig (49) |
| 9 April 1969 | Aberdeen | A | 0–0 | 20,000 | |
| 19 April 1969 | Morton | H | 3–0 | 25,072 | Sweeney (o.g. 15), Örjan Persson (32), Andy Penman (81) |
| 22 April 1969 | Dundee | A | 2–3 | 7,000 | John Greig (22), Willie Henderson (82) |
| 28 April 1969 | Dundee | H | 1–1 | 16,800 | Willie Johnston (90) |
| 1 May 1969 | Dunfermline Athletic | A | 3–0 | 11,700 | Willie Johnston (19,43), Andy Penman (82) |

* Colin Stein Rangers debut match

=== Inter-Cities Fairs Cup ===
| Date | Round | Opponent | Venue | Result | Attendance | Scorers |
|---|---|---|---|---|---|---|
| 18 September 1968 | R1 1 | Vojvodina | H | 2–0 | 66,328 | John Greig (28 Pen), Sandy Jardine (84) |
| 2 October 1968 | R1 2 | Vojvodina | A | 0–1 | 7,000 | |
| 30 October 1968 | R2 1 | Dundalk | H | 6–1 | 26,251 | Willie Henderson (13,26), John Greig (50), Alex Ferguson (55,90), Brennan (o.g. 88) |
| 13 November 1968 | R2 2 | Dundalk | A | 3–0 | 10,000 | Willie Mathieson (45), Colin Stein (64,81) |
| 15 January 1969 | R3 1 | DWS Amsterdam | A | 2–0 | 18,000 | Willie Johnston (38), Willie Henderson (53) |
| 22 January 1969 | R3 2 | DWS Amsterdam | H | 2–1 | 51,790 | Dave Smith (8), Colin Stein (22) |
| 19 March 1969 | QF 1 | Athletic Bilbao | H | 4–1 | 62,842 | Alex Ferguson (7), Andy Penman (27), Örjan Persson (86), Colin Stein (87) |
| 2 April 1969 | QF 2 | Athletic Bilbao | A | 0–2 | 40,000 | |
| 14 May 1969 | SF 1 | Newcastle United | H | 0–0 | 76,229 | |
| 21 May 1969 | SF 2 | Newcastle United | A | 0–2 | 59,611 | |

=== Scottish Cup ===
| Date | Round | Opponent | Venue | Result | Attendance | Scorers |
|---|---|---|---|---|---|---|
| 25 January 1969 | R1 | Hibernian | H | 1–0 | 58,141 | Colin Stein (67) |
| 24 February 1969 | R2 | Heart of Midlothian | A | 2–0 | 47,337 | Willie Johnston (32), Örjan Persson (49) |
| 1 March 1969 | QF | Airdrieonians | H | 1–0 | 46,726 | John Greig (2 Pen) |
| 22 March 1969 | SF | Aberdeen | N | 6–1 | 66,197 | Andy Penman (14,51), Willie Henderson (38) Willie Johnston (47,72,84) |
| 26 April 1969 | F | Celtic | N | 0–4 | 132,870 | ** |

**Alex Ferguson final match

=== League Cup ===
| Date | Round | Opponent | Venue | Result | Attendance | Scorers |
|---|---|---|---|---|---|---|
| 10 August 1968 | SR | Celtic | H | 0–2 | 80,119 | |
| 14 August 1968 | SR | Partick Thistle | A | 5–1 | 40,000 | Alex Smith (4,19), Alex Ferguson (49,59), Örjan Persson (62) |
| 17 August 1968 | SR | Morton | H | 2–0 | 40,000 | Colin Jackson (28,84) |
| 24 August 1968 | SR | Celtic | A | 0–1 | 75,000 | |
| 28 August 1969 | SR | Partick Thistle | H | 2–1 | 21,000 | Wille Henderson (12), Sandy Jardine (88) |
| 31 August 1968 | SR | Morton | H | 5–0 | 15,000 | Sandy Jardine (22,47), Willie Henderson (37,88), Andy Penman (75) |

== See also ==
- 1968–69 in Scottish football
- 1968–69 Scottish Cup
- 1968–69 Scottish League Cup
- 1968–69 Inter-Cities Fairs Cup
