= Tommy Campbell (footballer) =

Scottish footballer (1935–2018)

Personal information
- Full name: Thomas McMillan Campbell
- Date of birth: 20 February 1935
- Place of birth: Glasgow, Scotland
- Date of death: May 2018 (aged 83)
- Position: Striker

Senior career*
Years	Team	Apps	(Gls)
1956–1957	Kilmarnock	9	(0)
1958–1960	Albion Rovers	56	(33)
1960–1961	Dundee United	19	(14)
1961–1962	Tranmere Rovers	4	(0)
1962	Dumbarton	2	(0)
1962	Stenhousemuir	6	(3)
1962–1964	Albion Rovers	30	(16)
Total		126	(66)
- * Club domestic league appearances and goals

Thomas McMillan Campbell (20 February 1935 – 2018) was a Scottish footballer, who played as striker for Kilmarnock, Albion Rovers (two spells), Dundee United, Tranmere Rovers, Dumbarton and Stenhousemuir.

== Career ==
Beginning his career with Kilmarnock, Campbell moved to Albion Rovers where scored over thirty league goals in less than sixty league matches. His goalscoring form won him a move to Dundee United where he kept up his prolific record, netting fourteen goals in just nineteen league games. This included scoring a hat-trick against Hamilton Academical in his first match for club. Crucially he also was the scorer of the only goal in a 1–0 win over Berwick Rangers on 30 April which ensured Dundee United were promoted to Division One. However, by November 1960 he had dropped out of the first team line-up. In turn, he moved to English side Tranmere Rovers but was back in Scotland within the year, having failed to score in four matches. An even shorter spell at Dumbarton followed before a further short time at Stenhousemuir preceded a final playing period Albion Rovers. Upon retiring in 1964, Campbell managed more than a goal in every two league matches over his short career.
