= Joe Carr (Scottish footballer) =

Scottish footballer

Joe Carr (c. 1931 – 19 May 2015) was a Scottish footballer who played as a winger and played much of his career with St Johnstone.

Carr joined the Perth club from Dunipace Juniors in 1953 and went on to make 182 appearances for the club scoring 58 goals in the process, Carr went on to finish his career with Dumbarton.
