= Willie Munn =

Scottish footballer (born 1934)

Personal information
- Full name: William Munn
- Date of birth: 29 August 1934
- Position: Centre forward

Youth career
- Camelon

Senior career*
Years	Team	Apps	(Gls)
1958–1962	Stenhousemuir	96	(56)
1961–1964	Stirling Albion	31	(6)
1963–1964	Cowdenbeath	9	(0)
1963–1964	Dumbarton	1	(0)
- * Club domestic league appearances and goals

William Munn (born 29 August 1934) was a Scottish footballer who played for Stenhousemuir, Stirling Albion, Cowdenbeath and Dumbarton.
