= 1964–65 Rangers F.C. season =

Rangers
1964–65 season
- Chairman: John Lawrence
- Manager: Scot Symon
- Ground: Ibrox Park
- Scottish League Division One: 5th P34 W18 D8 L8 F78 A35 Pts44
- Scottish Cup: Quarter-finals
- League Cup: Winners
- European Cup: Quarter-finals
- Top goalscorer: League: Jim Forrest (30); All: Jim Forrest (56)

The 1964–65 season was the 85th season of competitive football by Rangers.

== Overview ==
Rangers played a total of 54 competitive matches during the 1964–65 season.

== Results ==
All results are written with Rangers' score first.

=== Scottish First Division ===
Date	Opponent	Venue	Result	Attendance	Scorers
19 August 1964	Dunfermline Athletic	H	0–0	22,693	
5 September 1964	Celtic	A	1–3	58,789	
12 September 1964	Partick Thistle	H	1–1	76,198	
19 September 1964	Dundee	A	1–4	21,451	
26 September 1964	Airdireonians	H	9–2	15,599	
7 October 1964	St Johnstone	A	1–0	22,160	
10 October 1964	Hibernian	H	2–4	37,288	
17 October 1964	Heart of Midlothian	A	1–1	19,046	
27 October 1964	St Mirren	A	7–0	10,503	
31 October 1964	Clyde	H	6–1	20,189	
7 November 1964	Aberdeen	H	2–2	28,697	
14 November 1964	Kilmarnock	A	1–1	33,225	
21 November 1964	Motherwell	H	1–0	15,409	
28 November 1964	Falkirk	A	5–0	22,204	
12 December 1964	Dundee United	A	3–1	13,212	
19 December 1964	Third Lanark	H	5–0	31,003	
1 January 1965	Celtic	H	1–0	64,443	
2 January 1965	Partick Thistle	A	1–1	58,445	
9 January 1965	Dundee	H	4–0	11,701	
16 January 1965	Airdrieonians	A	4–0	14,935	
30 January 1965	Hibernian	H	0–1	18,870	
13 February 1965	Heart of Midlothian	H	1–1	52,492	
27 February 1965	St Mirren	H	1–0	17,305	
10 March 1965	Clyde	A	3–0	8,706	
13 March 1965	Aberdeen	A	0–2	38,571	
20 March 1965	Kilmarnock	H	1–1	25,372	
24 March 1965	St Johnstone	H	2–1	14,815	
30 March 1965	Morton	H	0–1	12,421	
3 April 1965	Falkirk	H	6–1	19,535	
7 April 1965	Morton	A	3–1	16,387	
14 April 1965	Dunfermline Athletic	A	1–3	13,927	
17 April 1965	Dundee United	H	0–1	11,175	
21 April 1965	Motherwell	A	3–1	19,817	
23 April 1965	Third Lanark	A	1–0	10,606	

=== Scottish Cup ===
Date	Round	Opponent	Venue	Result	Attendance	Scorers
6 February 1965	R1	Hamilton Academical	H	3–0	22,184	Brand, Millar, Forrest
23 February 1965	R2	Dundee United	A	2–0	23,000	Forrest (2)
5 March 1965	QF	Hibernian	A	1–2	47,363	Hynd

=== League Cup ===
Date	Round	Opponent	Venue	Result	Attendance	Scorers
8 August 1964	SR	Aberdeen	H	4–0	45,000	Forrest, McLean (2) Wilson
12 August 1964	SR	St Mirren	A	0–0	21,000	
15 August 1964	SR	St Johnstone	A	9–1	15,000	Forrest (4) McLean (2) Brand (2) Baxter
22 August 1964	SR	Aberdeen	A	4–3	30,000	Forrest (3) Brand
26 August 1964	SR	St Mirren	H	6–2	35,000	Baxter, Forrest, McLean, Brand, Henderson, Wilson
29 August 1964	SR	St Johnstone	H	3–1	28,000	Forrest (3)
14 September 1964	QF1	Dunfermline Athletic	A	3–0	20,000	Forrest, Brand, McLean (og)
16 September 1964	QF2	Dunfermline Athletic	H	2–2	30,000	Millar, Forrest
30 September 1964	SF	Dundee United	N	2–1	39,584	Forrest (2)
24 October 1964	F	Celtic	N	2–1	91,423	Forrest (2)

=== European Cup ===
Date	Round	Opponent	Venue	Result	Attendance	Scorers
2 September 1964	R1L1	Red Star Belgrade	H	3–1	77,669	
9 September 1964	R1L2	Red Star Belgrade	A	2–4	42,939	
4 November 1964	R1R	Red Star Belgrade	N	3–1	49,520	
18 November 1964	R2L1	Rapid Vienna	H	1–0	50,788	
8 December 1964	R2L2	Rapid Vienna	A	2–0	69,272	
17 February 1965	QF1	Inter Milan	A	1–3	49,520	
3 March 1965	QF2	Inter Milan	H	1–0	78,872	

== See also ==
- 1964–65 in Scottish football
- 1964–65 Scottish Cup
- 1964–65 Scottish League Cup
- 1964–65 European Cup
