= 1967–68 Rangers F.C. season =

Rangers
1967–68 season
- Chairman: John Lawrence
- Manager: Scot Symon (until 1 November); David White (from 1 November)
- Ground: Ibrox Park
- Scottish League Division One: 2nd P34 W28 D5 L1 F93 A34 Pts61
- Scottish Cup: Quarter-finals
- League Cup: Sectional round
- Inter-Cities Fairs Cup: Quarter-finals
- Top goalscorer: League: Alex Ferguson (17); All: Alex Ferguson (22)

The 1967–68 season was the 88th season of competitive football by Rangers.

== Overview ==
Rangers played a total of 51 competitive matches during the 1967–68 season.

== Results ==
All results are written with Rangers' score first.

=== Scottish First Division ===
Date	Opponent	Venue	Result	Attendance	Scorers
9 September 1967	Partick Thistle	A	2–0	30,492	Penman (2)
16 September 1967	Celtic	H	1–0	87,595	Persson
23 September 1967	Falkirk	A	1–0	17,623	Penman
30 September 1967	Hearts	H	1–1	40,587	Ferguson
7 October 1967	Motherwell	A	2–0	19,627	Ferguson, Greig
14 October 1967	Clyde	A	3–1	24,509	Greg, Persson, Ferguson
23 October 1967	Dundee	H	2–0	26,016	Mathieson, Roger Hynd
28 October 1967	Dunfermline Athletic	H	0–0	32,675	
4 November 1967	St Johnstone	A	3–2	17,785	Willie Johnston, Alex Ferguson, Örjan Persson
11 November 1967	Morton	H	1–0	34,006	Johnston
18 November 1967	Stirling Albion	A	4–2	15,557	McKinnon, Andy Penman, Henderson, Örjan Persson
25 November 1967	Hibernian	H	2–0	44,556	John Greig (pen.), Alex Willoughby
2 December 1967	Airdrieonians	H	2–1	26,511	Johnston, Alex Ferguson
16 December 1967	Raith Rovers	H	10–2	23,432	Ferguson (3), Johnston (2), Persson (2), Greig (2, 1 pen.), Willoughby
23 December 1967	Kilmarnock	H	4–1	33,239	Willoughby (2), Willie Johnston, John Greig
30 December 1967	Aberdeen	A	4–1	22,521	Andy Penman, Bobby Watson, Willie Johnston, Willoughby
1 January 1968	Partick Thistle	H	5–2	30,830	Roger Hynd (2), Willie Johnston (2), Andy Penman
2 January 1968	Celtic	A	2–2	73,480	Willie Johnston, Kaj Johansen
6 January 1968	Falkirk	H	2–0	33,472	Alex Ferguson, Andy Penman
13 January 1968	Hearts	A	3–2	34,065	Willie Johnston (2), Alex Ferguson
20 January 1968	Motherwell	H	2–0	35,743	Alex Willoughby, John Greig (pen.)
3 February 1968	Clyde	H	1–0	35,706	John Greig
10 February 1968	Dundee	A	4–2	21,439	Willie Johnston (2), John Greig (pen.), Persson
2 March 1968	St Johnstone	H	6–2	26,298	Alex Ferguson (4 [1 pen.]), Alex Willoughby, Persson
6 March 1968	Dunfermline Athletic	H	2–1	22,175	Alex Ferguson, Örjan Persson
16 March 1968	Stirling Albion	H	5–0	16,866	Örjan Persson (3), Alex Ferguson, Corrigan (o.g.)
23 March 1968	Hibernian	A	3–1	27,195	Örjan Persson, Henderson, Johnston
30 March 1968	Airdrieonians	H	2–1	28,118	Johnston, Smith
2 April 1968	Dundee United	A	0–0	16,338	
6 April 1968	Dundee United	H	4–1	31,299	Alex Ferguson (2), Alex Willoughby, Willie Johnston
13 April 1968	Raith Rovers	H	3–2	18,288	Dave Smith, Alex Willoughby, Andy Penman
17 April 1968	Morton	A	3–3	17,177	John Greig (2), Willie Johnston
20 April 1968	Kilmarnock	A	2–1	17,286	Örjan Persson, Willoughby
27 April 1968	Aberdeen	H	2–3	35,814	Dave Smith, Ferguson

=== Inter-Cities Fairs Cup ===
Date	Round	Opponent	Venue	Result	Attendance	Scorers
21 September 1967	R1 1	Dynamo Dresden	A	1–1	70,000	Alex Ferguson
4 October 1967	R1 2	Dynamo Dresden	H	2–1	60,102	Andy Penman, John Greig
8 November 1967	R2 1	Cologne	H	3–0	30,003	Alex Ferguson (2), Willie Henderson
28 November 1967	R2 2	Cologne	A	1–3	10,000	Willie Henderson
26 March 1968	QF 1	Leeds United	H	0–0	85,288	
9 April 1968	QF 2	Leeds United	A	0–2	50,498	

=== Scottish Cup ===
Date	Round	Opponent	Venue	Result	Attendance	Scorers
27 January 1968	R1	Hamilton Academical	H	3–1	27,500	John Greig (2), Willie Johnston
17 February 1968	R2	Dundee	A	1–1	33,000	Stewart (o.g.)
4 March 1968	R2 R	Dundee	H	4–1	54,764	Bobby Watson (2), Örjan Persson, Easton (o.g.)
9 March 1968	QF	Hearts	H	1–1	54,090	Örjan Persson
11 March 1968	QF R	Hearts	A	0–1	44,094	

=== League Cup ===
Date	Round	Opponent	Venue	Result	Attendance	Scorers
12 August 1967	SR	Aberdeen	A	1–1	40,000	Örjan Persson
16 August 1967	SR	Celtic	H	1–1	94,168	Andy Penman
19 August 1967	SR	Dundee United	H	1–0	55,113	Kaj Johansen (pen.)
26 August 1967	SR	Aberdeen	H	3–0	50,522	Andy Penman (2), Sandy Jardine
30 August 1967	SR	Celtic	A	1–3	75,000	Willie Henderson
2 September 1967	SR	Dundee United	A	3–0	15,000	Alex Ferguson (2), Willie Johnston

== See also ==
- 1967–68 in Scottish football
- 1967–68 Scottish Cup
- 1967–68 Scottish League Cup
- 1967–68 Inter-Cities Fairs Cup
