= 1965–66 Rangers F.C. season =

Rangers
1965–66 season
- Chairman: John Wilson
- Manager: Scot Symon
- Ground: Ibrox Park
- Scottish League Division One: 2nd P34 W25 D5 L4 F91 A29 Pts55
- Scottish Cup: Winners
- League Cup: Runners-up
- Top goalscorer: League: George McLean (25); All: George McLean (39)

The 1965–66 season was the 86th season of competitive football by Rangers.

Rangers won the Scottish Cup for the 19th time after defeating Celtic in the final. The team also reached the final of the Scottish League Cup, where they lost to Celtic.

== Overview ==
Rangers played a total of 51 competitive matches during the 1965–66 season.

== Results ==
All results are written with Rangers' score first.

=== Scottish First Division ===
Date	Opponent	Venue	Result	Attendance	Scorers
25 August 1965	St Johnstone	H	3–2	22,693	
11 September 1965	Partick Thistle	A	1–1	29,789	
18 September 1965	Celtic	H	2–1	76,198	
25 September 1965	Dundee	A	1–1	21,451	
2 October 1965	Stirling Albion	H	6–0	25,599	
9 October 1965	St Mirren	A	1–1	22,160	
16 October 1965	Hibernian	A	2–1	37,288	
27 October 1965	Dundee United	H	2–0	29,046	
30 October 1965	Hamilton Academical	A	7–1	10,503	
6 November 1965	Falkirk	H	3–3	20,189	
13 November 1965	Heart of Midlothian	A	2–0	28,697	
20 November 1965	Kilmarnock	H	2–1	33,225	
27 November 1965	Motherwell	A	0–3	15,409	
11 December 1965	Morton	H	3–1	22,204	
18 December 1965	Clyde	A	2–2	13,212	
25 December 1965	Dunfermline Athletic	H	2–3	31,003	
1 January 1966	Partick Thistle	H	4–0	29,783	
3 January 1966	Celtic	A	1–5	65,445	
8 January 1966	St Johnstone	A	3–0	11,701	
22 January 1966	Stirling Albion	A	2–0	14,935	
29 January 1966	St Mirren	H	4–1	28,870	
12 February 1966	Hibernian	H	5–1	27,569	
26 February 1966	Hamilton Academical	H	4–0	27,305	
9 March 1966	Falkirk	A	2–3	8,706	
12 March 1966	Heart of Midlothian	H	1–1	38,571	
19 March 1966	Kilmarnock	A	1–1	25,372	
21 March 1966	Dundee United	A	0–1	14,815	
6 April 1966	Dundee	H	1–0	28,421	
9 April 1966	Aberdeen	H	1–0	29,535	
13 April 1966	Aberdeen	A	2–1	16,387	
16 April 1966	Morton	A	5–0	13,927	
19 April 1966	Motherwell	H	2–1	21,175	
30 April 1966	Dunfermline Athletic	A	2–1	19,817	
4 May 1966	Clyde	H	4–0	20,606	

=== Scottish Cup ===
Date	Round	Opponent	Venue	Result	Attendance	Scorers
5 February 1966	R1	Airdrieonians	H	5–1	16,400	
28 February 1966	R2	Ross County	A	2–0	8,500	
5 March 1966	QF	St Johnstone	H	1–0	32,000	
26 March 1966	SF	Aberdeen	N	0–0	42,280	
29 March 1966	SFR	Aberdeen	N	2–1	40,851	
23 April 1966	F	Celtic	N	0–0	126,552	
27 April 1966	FR	Celtic	N	1–0	98,202	

=== League Cup ===
Date	Round	Opponent	Venue	Result	Attendance	Scorers
14 August 1965	SR	Heart of Midlothian	A	2–4	32,859	
18 August 1965	SR	Clyde	H	3–0	24,806	
21 August 1965	SR	Aberdeen	A	0–2	23,662	
28 August 1965	SR	Heart of Midlothian	H	1–0	44,472	
1 September 1965	SR	Clyde	A	1–3	13,875	
4 September 1965	SR	Aberdeen	H	4–0	44,496	
15 September 1965	QF1	Airdrieonians	A	5–1	9,090	
22 September 1965	QF2	Airdrieonians	H	4–0	8,969	
6 October 1965	SF	Kilmarnock	N	6–4	54,473	
23 October 1965	F	Celtic	N	1–2	107,647	

== See also ==
- 1965–66 in Scottish football
- 1965–66 Scottish Cup
- 1965–66 Scottish League Cup
