= Hal Stewart (football manager) =

Scottish football manager (c.1907–1984)

Hal Stewart (c.1907 - 2 February 1984) was a Scottish football manager, best known for his career at Greenock Morton F.C.

Stewart joined Morton in 1961, when the club was at the bottom of the Scottish Football League Second Division, where he signed former internationals Archie Robertson and Doug Cowie, striker Allan McGraw, and winger Jimmy Wilson. In the 1963–64 season he led Morton to promotion to Division One on February 29, 1964, a British football record of 25 consecutive league wins (23 within the 1963–64 campaign), and the club's first League Cup final. The club was relegated in 1966 but in 1967, following Stewart's signing of 12 Danish internationals, the club was promoted again to Division One.
