= 1961–62 Scottish League Cup =

Tournament details
- Country: Scotland

Final positions
- Champions: Rangers
- Runners-up: Heart of Midlothian

The 1961–62 Scottish League Cup was the sixteenth season of Scotland's second football knockout competition. The competition was won Rangers for a second successive season, who defeated in a replay Heart of Midlothian in the Final.

== First round ==
=== Group 1 ===
Team	Pld	W	D	L	GF	GA	GR	Pts
St Johnstone	6	3	2	1	9	8	1.125	8
Celtic	6	3	1	2	10	10	1.000	7
Hibernian	6	2	2	2	11	9	1.222	6
Partick Thistle	6	1	1	4	10	13	0.769	3

Home team	Score	Away team	Date
Partick Thistle	2–3	Celtic	12 August 1961
St Johnstone	1–1	Hibernian	12 August 1961
Celtic	0–1	St Johnstone	16 August 1961
Hibernian	2–1	Partick Thistle	16 August 1961
Hibernian	2–2	Celtic	19 August 1961
Partick Thistle	0–0	St Johnstone	19 August 1961
Celtic	3–2	Partick Thistle	26 August 1961
Hibernian	4–1	St Johnstone	26 August 1961
Partick Thistle	2–1	Hibernian	30 August 1961
St Johnstone	2–0	Celtic	30 August 1961
Celtic	2–1	Hibernian	2 September 1961
St Johnstone	4–3	Partick Thistle	2 September 1961

=== Group 2 ===
Team	Pld	W	D	L	GF	GA	GR	Pts
Motherwell	6	4	1	1	14	10	1.400	9
Dunfermline Athletic	6	2	3	1	7	3	2.333	7
Aberdeen	6	1	2	3	11	14	0.786	4
Dundee United	6	1	2	3	10	15	0.667	4

Home team	Score	Away team	Date
Dunfermline Athletic	1–2	Aberdeen	12 August 1961
Motherwell	5–3	Dundee United	12 August 1961
Aberdeen	3–4	Motherwell	16 August 1961
Dundee United	0–0	Dunfermline Athletic	16 August 1961
Dundee United	5–3	Aberdeen	19 August 1961
Motherwell	1–1	Dunfermline Athletic	19 August 1961
Aberdeen	0–0	Dunfermline Athletic	26 August 1961
Dundee United	0–2	Motherwell	26 August 1961
Dunfermline Athletic	3–0	Dundee United	30 August 1961
Motherwell	2–1	Aberdeen	30 August 1961
Aberdeen	2–2	Dundee United	2 September 1961
Dunfermline Athletic	2–0	Motherwell	2 September 1961

=== Group 3 ===
Team	Pld	W	D	L	GF	GA	GR	Pts
Rangers	6	5	1	0	18	5	3.600	11
Dundee	6	2	2	2	14	10	1.400	6
Third Lanark	6	2	2	2	10	14	0.714	6
Airdrieonians	6	0	1	5	5	18	0.278	1

Home team	Score	Away team	Date
Dundee	2–0	Airdrieonians	12 August 1961
Third Lanark	0–2	Rangers	12 August 1961
Airdrieonians	2–2	Third Lanark	16 August 1961
Rangers	4–2	Dundee	16 August 1961
Airdrieonians	1–2	Rangers	19 August 1961
Third Lanark	3–2	Dundee	19 August 1961
Airdrieonians	0–5	Dundee	26 August 1961
Rangers	5–0	Third Lanark	26 August 1961
Dundee	1–1	Rangers	30 August 1961
Third Lanark	3–1	Airdrieonians	30 August 1961
Dundee	2–2	Third Lanark	2 September 1961
Rangers	4–1	Airdrieonians	2 September 1961

=== Group 4 ===
Team	Pld	W	D	L	GF	GA	GR	Pts
Heart of Midlothian	6	4	0	2	9	6	1.500	8
Kilmarnock	6	3	0	3	18	8	2.250	6
St Mirren	6	3	0	3	7	11	0.636	6
Raith Rovers	6	2	0	4	7	16	0.438	4

Home team	Score	Away team	Date
Heart of Midlothian	1–0	Raith Rovers	12 August 1961
St Mirren	1–0	Kilmarnock	12 August 1961
Kilmarnock	1–2	Heart of Midlothian	16 August 1961
Raith Rovers	0–3	St Mirren	16 August 1961
Raith Rovers	1–7	Kilmarnock	19 August 1961
St Mirren	1–0	Heart of Midlothian	19 August 1961
Kilmarnock	6–1	St Mirren	26 August 1961
Raith Rovers	3–1	Heart of Midlothian	26 August 1961
Heart of Midlothian	2–0	Kilmarnock	30 August 1961
St Mirren	0–2	Raith Rovers	30 August 1961
Heart of Midlothian	3–1	St Mirren	2 September 1961
Kilmarnock	4–1	Raith Rovers	2 September 1961

=== Group 5 ===
Team	Pld	W	D	L	GF	GA	GR	Pts
Stirling Albion	6	5	0	1	16	9	1.778	10
Berwick Rangers	6	3	1	2	13	13	1.000	7
Alloa Athletic	6	1	2	3	11	14	0.786	4
Stranraer	6	1	1	4	7	11	0.636	3

Home team	Score	Away team	Date
Alloa Athletic	2–3	Stirling Albion	12 August 1961
Berwick Rangers	2–1	Stranraer	12 August 1961
Stirling Albion	4–2	Berwick Rangers	16 August 1961
Stranraer	1–1	Alloa Athletic	16 August 1961
Berwick Rangers	3–1	Alloa Athletic	19 August 1961
Stirling Albion	4–1	Stranraer	19 August 1961
Stirling Albion	3–1	Alloa Athletic	26 August 1961
Stranraer	1–2	Berwick Rangers	26 August 1961
Alloa Athletic	2–0	Stranraer	30 August 1961
Berwick Rangers	0–2	Stirling Albion	30 August 1961
Alloa Athletic	4–4	Berwick Rangers	2 September 1961
Stranraer	3–0	Stirling Albion	2 September 1961

=== Group 6 ===
Team	Pld	W	D	L	GF	GA	GR	Pts
Hamilton Academical	6	5	1	0	16	8	2.000	11
Montrose	6	3	1	2	16	8	2.000	7
Clyde	6	3	0	3	14	14	1.000	6
Stenhousemuir	6	0	0	6	5	21	0.238	0

Home team	Score	Away team	Date
Clyde	3–0	Stenhousemuir	12 August 1961
Montrose	2–2	Hamilton Academical	12 August 1961
Hamilton Academical	3–2	Clyde	16 August 1961
Stenhousemuir	1–4	Montrose	16 August 1961
Clyde	3–2	Montrose	19 August 1961
Stenhousemuir	1–3	Hamilton Academical	19 August 1961
Hamilton Academical	2–0	Montrose	26 August 1961
Stenhousemuir	2–4	Clyde	26 August 1961
Clyde	2–3	Hamilton Academical	30 August 1961
Montrose	4–0	Stenhousemuir	30 August 1961
Hamilton Academical	3–1	Stenhousemuir	2 September 1961
Montrose	4–0	Clyde	2 September 1961

=== Group 7 ===
Team	Pld	W	D	L	GF	GA	GR	Pts
East Fife	6	6	0	0	25	5	5.000	12
Queen of the South	6	3	0	3	11	6	1.833	6
Arbroath	6	3	0	3	8	13	0.615	6
Brechin City	6	0	0	6	6	26	0.231	0

Home team	Score	Away team	Date
East Fife	3–1	Brechin City	12 August 1961
Queen of the South	1–0	Arbroath	12 August 1961
Arbroath	1–4	East Fife	16 August 1961
Brechin City	0–4	Queen of the South	16 August 1961
Brechin City	1–2	Arbroath	19 August 1961
Queen of the South	1–3	East Fife	19 August 1961
Arbroath	1–0	Queen of the South	26 August 1961
Brechin City	2–8	East Fife	26 August 1961
East Fife	6–0	Arbroath	30 August 1961
Queen of the South	5–1	Brechin City	30 August 1961
Arbroath	4–1	Brechin City	2 September 1961
East Fife	1–0	Queen of the South	2 September 1961

=== Group 8 ===
Team	Pld	W	D	L	GF	GA	GR	Pts
Ayr United	6	4	2	0	16	10	1.600	10
Falkirk	6	2	4	0	12	8	1.500	8
Cowdenbeath	6	1	2	3	11	14	0.786	4
Dumbarton	6	1	0	5	7	14	0.500	2

Home team	Score	Away team	Date
Ayr United	3–1	Dumbarton	12 August 1961
Falkirk	2–2	Cowdenbeath	12 August 1961
Cowdenbeath	2–3	Ayr United	16 August 1961
Dumbarton	0–1	Falkirk	16 August 1961
Ayr United	1–1	Falkirk	19 August 1961
Cowdenbeath	4–3	Dumbarton	19 August 1961
Cowdenbeath	1–1	Falkirk	26 August 1961
Dumbarton	1–2	Ayr United	26 August 1961
Ayr United	3–1	Cowdenbeath	30 August 1961
Falkirk	3–0	Dumbarton	30 August 1961
Dumbarton	2–1	Cowdenbeath	2 September 1961
Falkirk	4–4	Ayr United	2 September 1961

=== Group 9 ===
Team	Pld	W	D	L	GF	GA	GR	Pts
Albion Rovers	4	4	0	0	16	7	2.286	8
Queen's Park	4	3	0	1	14	7	2.000	6
East Stirlingshire	4	2	0	2	9	13	0.692	4
Morton	4	1	0	3	5	11	0.455	2
Forfar Athletic	4	0	0	4	5	11	0.455	0

Home team	Score	Away team	Date
Albion Rovers	5–2	East Stirlingshire	12 August 1961
Forfar Athletic	1–3	Queen's Park	12 August 1961
Morton	2–1	Forfar Athletic	16 August 1961
Queen's Park	1–3	Albion Rovers	16 August 1961
East Stirlingshire	4–1	Morton	19 August 1961
Forfar Athletic	3–5	Albion Rovers	19 August 1961
East Stirlingshire	1–0	Forfar Athletic	26 August 1961
Morton	1–3	Queen's Park	26 August 1961
Albion Rovers	3–1	Morton	2 September 1961
Queen's Park	7–2	East Stirlingshire	2 September 1961

== Supplementary round ==
=== First leg ===
Home team	Score	Away team	Date
East Fife	4–1	Albion Rovers	4 September 1961

=== Second leg ===
Home team	Score	Away team	Date	Agg
Albion Rovers	1–2	East Fife	6 September 1961	2–6

== Quarter-finals ==
=== First leg ===
Home team	Score	Away team	Date
Ayr United	4–2	Stirling Albion	13 September 1961
Hamilton Academical	1–2	Heart of Midlothian	13 September 1961
Motherwell	2–3	St Johnstone	13 September 1961
Rangers	3–1	East Fife	13 September 1961

=== Second leg ===
Home team	Score	Away team	Date	Agg
East Fife	1–3	Rangers	20 September 1961	2–6
Heart of Midlothian	2–0	Hamilton Academical	20 September 1961	4–1
St Johnstone	1–1	Motherwell	20 September 1961	4–3
Stirling Albion	3–0	Ayr United	20 September 1961	5–4

== Semi-finals ==
Home team	Score	Away team	Date
Heart of Midlothian	2–1	Stirling Albion	11 October 1961
Rangers	3–2	St Johnstone	11 October 1961

== Final ==
28 October 1961

Rangers	1 – 1 AET	Heart of Midlothian
Millar		Cumming (pen.)

Hampden Park, Glasgow
Attendance: 88,000

Replay

18 December 1961

Rangers	3–1	Heart of Midlothian
Millar; Brand; McMillan		Davidson

Hampden Park, Glasgow
Attendance: 47,500
