= Benny Friel =

Scottish footballer

Personal information
- Full name: Bernard James Friel
- Date of birth: 16 September 1941
- Place of birth: Glasgow, Scotland
- Date of death: 16 February 2010 (aged 68)
- Place of death: Phoenix, Arizona, United States
- Position: Inside forward

Youth career
- Vale of Leven

Senior career*
Years	Team	Apps	(Gls)
1962–1963	Dumbarton	20	(8)
1963–1965	Southend United	17	(8)
- * Club domestic league appearances and goals

Bernard James "Benny" Friel (16 September 1941 – 16 February 2010) was a Scottish footballer who played for Dumbarton and Southend United.
