= 1966–67 Rangers F.C. season =

Rangers
1966–67 season
- Chairman: John Lawrence
- Manager: Scot Symon
- Ground: Ibrox Park
- Scottish League Division One: 2nd P34 W24 D7 L3 F92 A31 Pts58
- Scottish Cup: First round
- League Cup: Runners-up
- Cup Winners' Cup: Runners-up
- Top goalscorer: League: Alex Smith (19); All: Alex Smith (23)

The 1966–67 season was the 87th season of competitive football by Rangers.

== Overview ==
Rangers played a total of 55 competitive matches during the 1966–67 season. The team suffered an infamous cup upset, when they lost 1–0 to Berwick Rangers in the first round of the 1966–67 Scottish Cup.

== Results ==
All results are written with Rangers' score first.

=== Scottish First Division ===
Date	Opponent	Venue	Result	Attendance	Scorers
10 September 1966	Partick Thistle	H	6–1	26,559	
17 September 1966	Celtic	A	0–2	61,333	
24 September 1966	Aberdeen	H	3–0	33,206	
1 October 1966	Dundee United	A	3–2	14,323	
8 October 1966	Falkirk	H	5–0	19,627	
15 October 1966	Hearts	A	1–1	27,828	
2 November 1966	St Mirren	A	6–1	9,849	
5 November 1966	Motherwell	H	5–1	24,481	
9 November 1966	Kilmarnock	H	3–0	28,839	
12 November 1966	St Johnstone	A	1–1	11,807	
19 November 1966	Ayr United	H	4–0	19,265	
26 November 1966	Hibernian	A	2–1	25,798	
3 December 1966	Dunfermline Athletic	A	2–3	18,079	
10 December 1966	Stirling Albion	H	4–0	19,797	
17 December 1966	Airdrieonians	H	3–0	14,570	
31 December 1966	Dundee	H	2–2	26,898	
2 January 1967	Partick Thistle	A	1–1	25,663	
14 January 1967	Dundee United	H	3–1	33,085	
18 January 1967	Aberdeen	A	2–1	31,294	
21 January 1967	Falkirk	A	1–0	14,182	
4 February 1967	Hearts	H	5–1	33,087	
8 February 1967	Clyde	A	5–1	19,574	
11 February 1967	Kilmarnock	A	2–1	31,551	
25 February 1967	St Mirren	H	3–0	21,875	
4 March 1967	Motherwell	A	5–1	17,907	
7 March 1967	Airdrieonians	A	1–0	13,869	
18 March 1967	Ayr United	A	4–1	11,374	
25 March 1967	Hibernian	H	1–0	33,095	
29 March 1967	St Johnstone	H	4–3	19,667	
1 April 1967	Dunfermline Athletic	H	0–1	29,528	
8 April 1967	Stirling Albion	H	1–0	8,402	
22 April 1967	Clyde	H	1–1	19,880	
29 April 1967	Dundee	A	1–1	16,851	
6 May 1967	Celtic	H	2–2	78,790	

=== Cup Winners' Cup ===
Date	Round	Opponent	Venue	Result	Attendance	Scorers
27 September 1966	R1 1	Glentoran	A	1–1	40,000	
5 October 1966	R1 2	Glentoran	H	4–0	33,473	
23 November 1966	R2 1	Borussia Dortmond	H	2–1	65,299	
6 December 1966	R2 2	Borussia Dortmond	A	0–0	40,000	
1 March 1967	QF 1	Real Zaragoza	H	2–0	65,203	
22 March 1967	QF 2	Real Zaragoza	A	0–2	40,000	
19 April 1967	SF 1	Slavia Sofia	A	1–0	48.000	
3 May 1967	SF 2	Slavia Sofia	H	1–0	71,110	
31 May 1967	F	Bayern Munich	N	0–1	69,509	

=== Scottish Cup ===
Date	Round	Opponent	Venue	Result	Attendance	Scorers
28 January 1967	R1	Berwick Rangers	A	0–1	13,283	

=== League Cup ===
Date	Round	Opponent	Venue	Result	Attendance	Scorers
13 August 1966	SR	Hibernian	H	1–0	41,154	
17 August 1966	SR	Stirling Albion	A	8–0	13,561	
20 August 1966	SR	Kilmarnock	H	0–0	51,765	
27 August 1966	SR	Hibernian	A	2–3	32,913	
31 August 1966	SR	Stirling Albion	H	1–1	13,631	
3 September 1966	SR	Kilmarnock	A	1–0	29,743	
14 September 1966	QF1	Ayr United	A	1–1	14,071	
21 September 1966	QF2	Ayr United	H	3–0	23,691	
19 October 1966	SF	Aberdeen	N	2–2	38,332	
24 October 1966	SFR	Aberdeen	N	2–0	38,104	
29 October 1966	F	Celtic	N	0–1	94,532	

== See also ==
- 1966–67 in Scottish football
- 1966–67 Scottish Cup
- 1966–67 Scottish League Cup
- 1966–67 European Cup Winners' Cup
