= 1962–63 Scottish Division Two =

Scottish Second Division
- Season: 1962–63
- Champions: St Johnstone
- Promoted: St Johnstone; East Stirlingshire

The 1962–63 Scottish Second Division was won by St Johnstone who, along with second placed East Stirlingshire, were promoted to the First Division. Brechin City finished bottom.

== Table ==
Pos	Team	Pld	W	D	L	GF	GA	GR	Pts	Promotion or relegation
1	St Johnstone (C, P)	36	25	5	6	83	37	2.243	55	Promotion to 1963–64 Scottish First Division
2	East Stirlingshire (P)	36	20	9	7	80	50	1.600	49	Promotion to 1963–64 Scottish First Division
3	Morton	36	23	2	11	100	49	2.041	48	
4	Hamilton Academical	36	18	8	10	69	56	1.232	44	
5	Stranraer	36	16	10	10	81	70	1.157	42	
6	Arbroath	36	18	4	14	74	51	1.451	40	
7	Albion Rovers	36	18	2	16	72	79	0.911	38	
8	Cowdenbeath	36	15	7	14	72	61	1.180	37	
9	Alloa Athletic	36	15	6	15	57	56	1.018	36	
10	Stirling Albion	36	16	4	16	74	75	0.987	36	
11	East Fife	36	15	6	15	60	69	0.870	36	
12	Dumbarton	36	15	4	17	64	64	1.000	34	
13	Ayr United	36	13	8	15	68	77	0.883	34	
14	Queen's Park	36	13	6	17	66	72	0.917	32	
15	Montrose	36	13	5	18	57	70	0.814	31	
16	Stenhousemuir	36	13	5	18	54	75	0.720	31	
17	Berwick Rangers	36	11	7	18	57	77	0.740	29	
18	Forfar Athletic	36	9	5	22	73	99	0.737	23	
19	Brechin City	36	3	3	30	39	113	0.345	9	

Source: statto.com
Rules for classification: 1) points; 2) goal ratio.
(C) Champions; (P) Promoted
