= Hugh Harra =

Scottish footballer

Personal information
- Full name: Hugh Harra
- Date of birth: 29 March 1936 (age 90)
- Position: Half back

Youth career
- Rutherglen Glencairn

Senior career*
Years	Team	Apps	(Gls)
1957–1962	Falkirk	11	(0)
1962–1967	Dumbarton	132	(10)
- * Club domestic league appearances and goals

Hugh Harra (born 29 March 1936) was a Scottish footballer who played for Falkirk and Dumbarton.
