= 1962–63 Rangers F.C. season =

Rangers
1962–63 season
- Chairman: John Wilson (until February); John Lawrence (from February)
- Manager: Scot Symon
- Ground: Ibrox Park
- Scottish League Division One: 1st P34 W25 D7 L2 F94 A28 Pts57
- Scottish Cup: Winners
- League Cup: Semi-finals
- European Cup Winners' Cup: First round
- Top goalscorer: League: Jimmy Millar (??); All: Jimmy Millar (42)

The 1962–63 season was the 83rd season of competitive football by Rangers.

== Overview ==
Rangers played a total of 54 competitive matches during the 1962–63 season.

== Results ==
All results are written with Rangers' score first.

=== Scottish First Division ===
Date	Opponent	Venue	Result	Attendance	Scorers
22 August 1962	St Mirren	H	3–0	46,000	Wilson(og) Brand, Millar
8 September 1962	Celtic	A	1–0	72,000	Henderson
15 September 1962	Partick Thistle	H	2–1	52,000	Millar(2)
22 September 1962	Hibernian	A	5–1	27,000	Millar(2) Baxter, Wilson(2,1pen)
29 September 1962	Dundee	H	1–1	57,000	Millar
6 October 1962	Queen of the South	A	4–0	20,000	Millar(2) Brand(2)
13 October 1962	Airdrieonians	H	5–2	28,000	Millar(2) Wilson(pen) McMillan, Greig
23 October 1962	Third Lanark	A	4–1	20,000	Henderson(2), Wilson, Brand
27 October 1962	Aberdeen	A	3–2	40,000	Millar, Wilson, Greig
3 November 1962	Dunfermline Athletic	H	1–1	38,000	Wilson(pen)
10 November 1962	Dundee United	A	1–2	24,000	Greig
17 November 1962	Falkirk	H	4–0	18,000	Millar(2) Wilson, Greig
24 November 1962	Clyde	H	3–1	26,000	Brand(2) Millar
1 December 1962	Motherwell	A	1–1	18.000	Davis
8 December 1962	Kilmarnock	H	6–1	40,000	Wilson, Millar, Brand(3) Henderson
15 December 1962	Raith Rovers	H	4–2	16,000	Wilson, Brand(3)
29 December 1962	St Mirren	A	2–0	21,000	Scott, Millar
1 January 1963	Celtic	H	4–0	55,000	Davis, Millar, Greig, Wilson
9 March 1963	Dunfermline Athletic	A	2–1	22,500	Wilson, Millar
16 March 1963	Dundee United	H	5–0	32,000	Millar(4) Brand
23 March 1963	Falkirk	A	2–0	16,500	Henderson, McLean
27 March 1963	Heart of Midlothian	A	5–0	35,000	Millar(2) McLean, Wilson(2)
10 April 1963	Hibernian	H	3–1	25,000	Wilson(2) Brand
17 April 1963	Partick Thistle	A	4–1	8,706	Wilson(4)
20 April 1963	Raith Rovers	A	2–2	10,000	Haig(og) Millar
27 April 1963	Heart of Midlothian	H	5–1	40,000	Baxter(2) Holt(og) Brand, Wilson
29 April 1963	Motherwell	H	1–1	34,815	Wilson
6 May 1963	Airdrieonians	A	2–0	6,500	Baxter, Brand
11 May 1963	Third Lanark	H	1–0	34,000	Brand
13 May 1963	Kilmarnock	A	0–1	12,000	
18 May 1963	Queen of the South	H	3–1	17,000	Millar(2) Brand
22 May 1963	Clyde	A	3–1	6,000	Willoughby(2) Brand
25 May 1963	Dundee	A	0–0	18,000	
27 May 1963	Aberdeen	H	2–2	30,606	Wilson(2)

=== Scottish Cup ===
Date	Round	Opponent	Venue	Result	Attendance	Scorers
13 March 1963	R2	Airdrieonians	A	6–0	17,823	Brand(pen), Wilson(3), Henderson, Thomson(og)
20 March 1963	R3	East Stirlingshire	H	7–2	35,000	Brand(4), Wilson, Millar, McLean
30 March 1963	QF	Dundee	A	1–1	36,839	Brand
3 April 1963	QF(r)	Dundee	H	3–2	81,190	Hamilton(og), Brand(2,1pen)
13 April 1963	SF	Dundee United	N	5–2	56,391	Millar(3), Brand, McLean
4 May 1963	F	Celtic	N	1–1	129,527	Brand
15 May 1963	F(r)	Celtic	N	3–0	120,263	Brand(2), Wilson

=== League Cup ===
Date	Round	Opponent	Venue	Result	Attendance	Scorers
11 August 1962	SR	Hibernian	A	4–1	36,500	Henderson, Brand(2,1pen) Wilson
15 August 1962	SR	Third Lanark	H	5–2	25,000	Millar(3) Scott, Wilson
18 August 1962	SR	St Mirren	A	1–2	37,000	Murray
25 August 1962	SR	Hibernian	H	0–0	45,000	
29 August 1962	SR	Third Lanark	A	5–2	35,000	Millar(3) Scott(2)
1 September 1962	SR	St Mirren	H	4–0	47,000	Millar, Greig(3)
12 September 1962	QF1	Dumbarton	A	3–1	19,000	Millar, Greig, Wilson(pen)
19 September 1962	QF2	Dumbarton	H	1–1	27,504	Greig
10 October 1962	SF	Kilmarnock	N	2–3	76,000	Brand(2)

=== European Cup Winners Cup ===
Date	Round	Opponent	Venue	Result	Attendance	Scorers
5 September 1962	PRL1	Seville	H	4–0	65,000	Millar(3), Brand
26 September 1962	PRL2	Seville	A	0–2	25,000	
31 October 1962	R1L1	Tottenham Hotspur	A	2–5	58,859	Henderson, Millar
11 December 1962	R1L2	Tottenham Hotspur	H	2–3	80,023	Brand, Wilson

== See also ==
- 1962–63 in Scottish football
- 1962–63 Scottish Cup
- 1962–63 Scottish League Cup
- 1962–63 European Cup Winners' Cup
