= 1963–64 Scottish Division Two =

Scottish Second Division
- Season: 1963–64
- Champions: Morton
- Promoted: Morton; Clyde

The 1963–64 Scottish Second Division was won by Morton who, along with second placed Clyde, were promoted to the First Division. Stirling Albion finished bottom.

== Table ==
| Pos | Team | Pld | W | D | L | GF | GA | GD | Pts | Promotion or relegation |
|---|---|---|---|---|---|---|---|---|---|---|
| 1 | Morton | 36 | 32 | 3 | 1 | 135 | 37 | +98 | 67 | Promotion to the 1964–65 First Division |
| 2 | Clyde | 36 | 22 | 9 | 5 | 81 | 44 | +37 | 53 | Promotion to the 1964–65 First Division |
| 3 | Arbroath | 36 | 20 | 6 | 10 | 79 | 46 | +33 | 46 | |
| 4 | East Fife | 36 | 16 | 13 | 7 | 92 | 57 | +35 | 45 | |
| 5 | Montrose | 36 | 19 | 6 | 11 | 79 | 57 | +22 | 44 | |
| 6 | Dumbarton | 36 | 16 | 6 | 14 | 67 | 59 | +8 | 38 | |
| 7 | Queen's Park | 36 | 17 | 4 | 15 | 57 | 54 | +3 | 38 | |
| 8 | Stranraer | 36 | 16 | 6 | 14 | 71 | 73 | −2 | 38 | |
| 9 | Albion Rovers | 36 | 12 | 12 | 12 | 67 | 71 | −4 | 36 | |
| 10 | Raith Rovers | 36 | 15 | 5 | 16 | 70 | 61 | +9 | 35 | |
| 11 | Stenhousemuir | 36 | 15 | 5 | 16 | 83 | 75 | +8 | 35 | |
| 12 | Berwick Rangers | 36 | 10 | 10 | 16 | 68 | 84 | −16 | 30 | |
| 13 | Hamilton Academical | 36 | 12 | 6 | 18 | 65 | 81 | −16 | 30 | |
| 14 | Ayr United | 36 | 12 | 5 | 19 | 58 | 83 | −25 | 29 | |
| 15 | Brechin City | 36 | 10 | 8 | 18 | 61 | 98 | −37 | 28 | |
| 16 | Alloa Athletic | 36 | 11 | 5 | 20 | 64 | 92 | −28 | 27 | |
| 17 | Cowdenbeath | 36 | 7 | 11 | 18 | 46 | 72 | −26 | 25 | |
| 18 | Forfar Athletic | 36 | 6 | 8 | 22 | 57 | 104 | −47 | 20 | |
| 19 | Stirling Albion | 36 | 6 | 8 | 22 | 47 | 99 | −52 | 20 | |
