= Don Bowie (footballer) =

Scottish footballer

Personal information
- Full name: Donald Shaw Bowie
- Date of birth: 14 April 1940 (age 86)
- Position: Winger

Senior career*
| Years | Team | Apps | (Gls) |
| 1960–1961 | Rangers | | |
| 1962–1964 | Dumbarton | 58 | (10) |
| 1964–1966 | Stirling Albion | 36 | (5) |
| 1965–1967 | Stenhousemuir | 13 | (1) |
- * Club domestic league appearances and goals

Donald Shaw Bowie (born 14 April 1940) was a Scottish footballer who played for Rangers, Dumbarton, Stirling Albion and Stenhousemuir.
