= 1984–85 Dumbarton F.C. season =

Dumbarton
1984–1985 season
- Manager: Davie Wilson
- Stadium: Boghead Park, Dumbarton
- Scottish Premier League: 9th
- Scottish Cup: Third Round
- Scottish League Cup: Second Round
- Top goalscorer: League: Joe Coyle (7); All: Joe Coyle (9)

Season 1984–85 was the 101st football season in which Dumbarton competed at a Scottish national level, entering the Scottish Football League for the 79th time, the Scottish Cup for the 90th time and the Scottish League Cup for the 38th time.

== Overview ==
Dumbarton's return to the top tier of Scottish league football for the first time in a decade was to be short-lived. At the end of the year, it was looking likely that survival might be achieved, being 6 points clear of the relegation zone, however with only a win and a draw being taken from the last 15 matches, Dumbarton finished in 9th place and relegated to the First Division for next season.

In the Scottish Cup, Dumbarton lost to First Division Motherwell in the third round - the team who would replace them in the Premier Division at the end of the season.

The League Cup format reverted to straight knock-out, and after a first round win over Queen of the South, Dumbarton lost to fellow Premier Division opponents Dundee United.

Locally, in the Stirlingshire Cup, after a win on penalties over Falkirk in the first round, a reversal of rolls was the case in the semi-final in a disappointing 'penalties' semi final defeat to East Stirling.

Finally, Premier Division status brought with it an added bonus - being a participant in the annual televised indoor Tennent's Sixes tournament. Unfortunately Dumbarton did not progress beyond the group stages.

== Results & fixtures ==
Win Draw Loss

=== Scottish Premier Division ===
| 11 August 1984 Scottish Premier | Morton | 2–1 | Dumbarton | Cappielow Park |
| | McNeill 35' (pen.), 44' | | Robertson 83' | Attendance: 2,500; Referee: A Ferguson |

| 18 August 1984 Scottish Premier | Dumbarton | 1–2 | Rangers | Boghead Park |
| | Craig 16' | | McCoist 81'; Redford 83' | Attendance: 10,000; Referee: R Cuthill |

| 25 August 1984 Scottish Premier | Dumbarton | 2–1 | Dundee | Boghead Park |
| | Coyle, J 2', 35' | | Stephen 42' | Attendance: 2,000; Referee: C Sinclair |

| 1 September 1984 Scottish Premier | Hearts | 1–0 | Dumbarton | Tynecastle Stadium |
| | Park 39' | | | Attendance: 6,914; Referee: A Roy |

| 8 September 1984 Scottish Premier | Dumbarton | 1–1 | Celtic | Boghead Park |
| | Coyle, J 77' (pen.) | | McGarvey 33' | Attendance: 8,416; Referee: I Cathcart |

| 15 September 1984 Scottish Premier | Hibernian | 2–3 | Dumbarton | Easter Road |
| | Thomson 15'; Kane 88' | | Coyle, J 28' (pen.), 32'; Coyle, T 39' | Attendance: 3,642; Referee: D McVicar |

| 22 September 1984 Scottish Premier | Dumbarton | 0–2 | Aberdeen | Boghead Park |
| | | | Miller 77'; Falconer 85' | Attendance: 4,000; Referee: T Muirhead |

| 29 September 1984 Scottish Premier | Dumbarton | 0–1 | St Mirren | Boghead Park |
| | | | McAvennie 21' | Attendance: 2,520; Referee: D Galloway |

| 6 October 1984 Scottish Premier | Dundee United | 1–0 | Dumbarton | Tannadice Park |
| | Coyne 74' | | | Attendance: 5,852; Referee: W Crombie |

| 13 October 1984 Scottish Premier | Dumbarton | 3–1 | Morton | Boghead Park |
| | Dunlop 25' (o.g.); Coyle, J 26' (pen.); Kay 55' | | Dunlop 53' | Attendance: 2,000; Referee: B Robertson |

| 20 October 1984 Scottish Premier | Rangers | 0–0 | Dumbarton | Ibrox Park |
| | | | | Attendance: 16,521; Referee: J Renton |

| 27 October 1984 Scottish Premier | Dundee | 1–1 | Dumbarton | Dens Park |
| | Smith 93' | | Ashwood 9' | Attendance: 4,375; Referee: L Thow; Man of the Match: T McKinlay |

| 3 November 1984 Scottish Premier | Dumbarton | 0–1 | Hearts | Boghead Park |
| | | | Bone 85' | Attendance: 2,706; Referee: E Brolis |

| 10 November 1984 Scottish Premier | Celtic | 2–0 | Dumbarton | Celtic Park |
| | McGarvey 36'; Johnston 55' | | | Attendance: 13,701; Referee: A Hewitt |

| 17 November 1984 Scottish Premier | Dumbarton | 2–2 | Hibernian | Boghead Park |
| | Craig 2'; McGowan 14' | | Durie 46', 47' | Attendance: 2,003; Referee: C Sinclair |

| 24 November 1984 Scottish Premier | Aberdeen | 1–0 | Dumbarton | Pittodrie Park |
| | McDougall 1' | | | Attendance: 13,200; Referee: D Galloway |

| 1 December 1984 Scottish Premier | St Mirren | 0–0 | Dumbarton | Love Street (stadium) |
| | | | | Attendance: 2,450; Referee: H Young |

| 8 December 1984 Scottish Premier | Dumbarton | 2–2 | Dundee United | Boghead Park |
| | Bourke 41'; Crawley 44' | | Dodds 14'; Bannon 75' (pen.) | Attendance: 1,524; Referee: W Crombie |

| 15 December 1984 Scottish Premier | Morton | 2–4 | Dumbarton | Cappielow Park |
| | Sullivan 4', 53' | | Bourke 5', 78'; Coyle, T 58'; Simpson 74' | Attendance: 2,000; Referee: W Crombie |

| 29 December 1984 Scottish Premier | Dumbarton | 2–4 | Rangers | Boghead Park |
| | Simpson 62'; Coyle, J 88' (pen.) | | Ferguson, I 33'; McMinn 38'; Mitchell 66'; Cooper 74' | Attendance: 7.800; Referee: G Smith |

| 1 January 1985 Scottish Premier | Dumbarton | 1–0 | Dundee | Boghead Park |
| | Craig 19' | | | Attendance: 2,500; Referee: W McLean |

| 5 January 1985 Scottish Premier | Hearts | 5–1 | Dumbarton | Tynecastle Stadium |
| | Black 10' (pen.), 60', 71'; Clark 84'; Bone 87' | | McNeill 77' | Attendance: 7,571; Referee: J Cathcart; Man of the Match: K Black |

| 19 January 1985 Scottish Premier | Hibernian | 3–1 | Dumbarton | Easter Road |
| | Sneddon 27'; Rice 55' (pen.); Durie 59' | | Kay 32' | Attendance: 7,421; Referee: A Roy; Man of the Match: M Weir |

| 2 February 1985 Scottish Premier | Dumbarton | 0–2 | Aberdeen | Boghead Park |
| | | | Stark 36'; Black 65' | Attendance: 3,500; Referee: A Huett; Man of the Match: E Black |

| 9 February 1985 Scottish Premier | Dumbarton | 1–1 | St Mirren | Boghead Park |
| | Kay 51' | | McAvennie 29' | Attendance: 1,684; Referee: D Syme; Man of the Match: A Kay |

| 23 February 1985 Scottish Premier | Dundee United | 4–0 | Dumbarton | Tannadice Park |
| | Milne 17'; Reilly 25'; Gough 76'; Sturrock 77' | | | Attendance: 5,693; Referee: W Knowles; Man of the Match: R Gough |

| 2 March 1985 Scottish Premier | Rangers | 3–1 | Dumbarton | Ibrox Park |
| | Ferguson 16'; McCoist 27', 46' | | Coyle, T 67' | Attendance: 8,424; Referee: D Downie |

| 16 March 1985 Scottish Premier | Dumbarton | 1–0 | Morton | Boghead Park |
| | Simpson 62' | | | Attendance: 900; Referee: J Duncan; Man of the Match: H Simpson |

| 23 March 1985 Scottish Premier | Dumbarton | 1–3 | Hearts | Boghead Park |
| | Bourke 78' | | Kidd 24'; Clark 39', 82' | Attendance: 2,207; Referee: T Muirhead |

| 3 April 1985 Scottish Premier | Dumbarton | 0–2 | Celtic | Boghead Park |
| | | | Johnston 34'; McClair 44' | Attendance: 7,000; Referee: D Hope |

| 6 April 1985 Scottish Premier | Dumbarton | 0–2 | Hibernian | Boghead Park |
| | | | Irvine 25'; Rice 32' | Attendance: 5,064; Referee: B Robertson |

| 13 April 1985 Scottish Premier | Dundee | 1–0 | Dumbarton | Dens Park |
| | Rafferty 62' | | | Attendance: 3,386; Referee: B Crombie |

| 20 April 1985 Scottish Premier | Aberdeen | 4–0 | Dumbarton | Pittodrie Park |
| | McLeish 24'; Angus 35'; Kay 49' (o.g.); Stark 65' | | | Attendance: 12,500; Referee: J Renton |

| 27 April 1985 Scottish Premier | Dumbarton | 0–2 | Dundee United | Boghead Park |
| | | | Coyne 3'; Sturrock 84' | Attendance: 818; Referee: K Hope; Man of the Match: G Arthur |

| 4 May 1985 Scottish Premier | St Mirren | 1–0 | Dumbarton | Love Street (stadium) |
| | Godfrey 8' | | | Attendance: 2,646; Referee: W McLeish |

| 11 May 1985 Scottish Premier | Celtic | 2–0 | Dumbarton | Celtic Park |
| | McClair 74'; McStay 84' | | | Attendance: 6,514; Referee: L Thow |

=== Scottish Cup ===
| 30 January 1985 Scottish Cup round 3 | Motherwell | 4–0 | Dumbarton | Fir Park |
| | Blair 22'; Stewart 65', 77'; 75' | | | Attendance: 2,852; Referee: D Downie |

=== Scottish League Cup ===
| 29 August 1984 Scottish League Cup round 2 | Dumbarton | 0–4 | Dundee United | Boghead Park |
| | | | Dodds 28', 64'; Milne 75', 79' | Attendance: 2,500; Referee: H Young |

=== Stirlingshire Cup ===
| 23 October 1984 First Round | Falkirk | 1–1 (4-5 on penalties) | Dumbarton | Brockville Park |
| | Craig | | Houston 83' |

| 8 May 1985 Semi-final | East Stirling | 0–0 (3-2 on penalties) | Dumbarton | Firs Park |

=== Pre-season and other matches ===
| 31 July984 Friendly | Queens Park | 1–2 | Dumbarton | Hampden Park |
| | Goal | | Bourke; Ashwood |

| 4 August 1984 Friendly | Dumbarton | 2–1 | (England) Watford | Boghead Park |
| | Craig 16'; Bourke 55' | | Johnston 30' | Attendance: 4,000; Referee: D Hope |

| 16 February 1985 Friendly | Kilmarnock | 3–5 | Dumbarton | Rugby Park |
| | Goal | | Goal |

== League table ==
| Pos | Team | Pld | W | D | L | GF | GA | GD | Pts | Qualification or relegation |
|---|---|---|---|---|---|---|---|---|---|---|
| 6 | Dundee | 36 | 15 | 7 | 14 | 48 | 50 | −2 | 37 | |
| 7 | Heart of Midlothian | 36 | 13 | 5 | 18 | 47 | 64 | −17 | 31 | |
| 8 | Hibernian | 36 | 10 | 7 | 19 | 38 | 61 | −23 | 27 | |
| 9 | Dumbarton (R) | 36 | 6 | 7 | 23 | 29 | 64 | −35 | 19 | Relegation to the 1985–86 Scottish First Division |
| 10 | Morton (R) | 36 | 5 | 2 | 29 | 29 | 100 | −71 | 12 | Relegation to the 1985–86 Scottish First Division |

Source: Statto
Rules for classification: 1) points; 2) goal difference; 3) number of goals scored.
(R) Relegated

== Player statistics ==
=== Squad ===
| No. | Pos | Nat | Player | Total | | Premier Division | | League Cup | | Scottish Cup | |
| No. | Pos | Nat | Player | Apps | Goals | Apps | Goals | Apps | Goals | Apps | Goals |
|---|---|---|---|---|---|---|---|---|---|---|---|
| | GK | (Scotland) SCO | Gordon Arthur | 38 | 0 | 35+0 | 0 | 2+0 | 0 | 1+0 | 0 |
| | GK | (Scotland) SCO | Dougie McNab | 1 | 0 | 1+0 | 0 | 0+0 | 0 | 0+0 | 0 |
| | DF | (Scotland) SCO | Rob Campbell | 1 | 0 | 0+1 | 0 | 0+0 | 0 | 0+0 | 0 |
| | DF | (Scotland) SCO | Martin McGowan | 30 | 0 | 28+0 | 0 | 2+0 | 0 | 0+0 | 0 |
| | DF | (Scotland) SCO | Ray Montgomerie | 6 | 0 | 6+0 | 0 | 0+0 | 0 | 0+0 | 0 |
| | MF | (Scotland) SCO | Mark Clougherty | 31 | 0 | 28+0 | 0 | 2+0 | 0 | 1+0 | 0 |
| | MF | (Scotland) SCO | Tommy Coyle | 39 | 3 | 34+2 | 3 | 2+0 | 0 | 1+0 | 0 |
| | MF | (Scotland) SCO | Albert Craig | 38 | 4 | 35+0 | 4 | 2+0 | 0 | 1+0 | 0 |
| | MF | (Scotland) SCO | Harry Curran | 2 | 0 | 0+2 | 0 | 0+0 | 0 | 0+0 | 0 |
| | MF | (Scotland) SCO | Alan Kay | 39 | 3 | 36+0 | 3 | 2+0 | 0 | 1+0 | 0 |
| | MF | (Scotland) SCO | Steve McCahill | 28 | 0 | 26+0 | 0 | 0+1 | 0 | 1+0 | 0 |
| | MF | (Scotland) SCO | Dave McCaig | 3 | 0 | 0+3 | 0 | 0+0 | 0 | 0+0 | 0 |
| | MF | (Scotland) SCO | Donald McNeil | 30 | 1 | 24+3 | 1 | 2+0 | 0 | 1+0 | 0 |
| | MF | (Scotland) SCO | Stuart Robertson | 25 | 1 | 21+2 | 1 | 1+0 | 0 | 1+0 | 0 |
| | MF | (Scotland) SCO | Jim Simpson | 28 | 3 | 15+10 | 3 | 0+2 | 0 | 1+0 | 0 |
| | MF | (Scotland) SCO | Graeme Sinclair | 5 | 0 | 5+0 | 0 | 0+0 | 0 | 0+0 | 0 |
| | FW | (Scotland) SCO | Kenny Ashwood | 28 | 1 | 19+6 | 1 | 2+0 | 0 | 0+1 | 0 |
| | FW | (Scotland) SCO | John Bourke | 29 | 4 | 24+2 | 4 | 2+0 | 0 | 1+0 | 0 |
| | FW | (Scotland) SCO | Joe Coyle | 38 | 9 | 28+7 | 7 | 2+0 | 0 | 1+0 | 2 |
| | FW | (Scotland) SCO | Gerry Crawley | 22 | 1 | 16+5 | 1 | 1+0 | 0 | 0+0 | 0 |
| | FW | (Scotland) SCO | Stuart MacIver | 3 | 0 | 1+2 | 0 | 0+0 | 0 | 0+0 | 0 |
| | FW | (Scotland) SCO | Pat McGowan | 15 | 1 | 13+1 | 1 | 0+0 | 0 | 0+1 | 0 |
| | FW | (Scotland) SCO | Allan Moore | 4 | 0 | 1+3 | 0 | 0+0 | 0 | 0+0 | 0 |

== Transfers ==
=== Players in ===
| Player | From | Date |
|---|---|---|
| (Scotland) Steve McCahill | (Scotland) Glennifer Thistle | 14 Jun 1984 |
| (Scotland) Jim Simpson | (Scotland) Kilmarnock | 1 Jul 1984 |
| (Scotland) Harry Curran | (Scotland) Eastercraigs | 20 Jul 1984 |
| (Scotland) Rob Campbell | (Scotland) Cowdenbeath | 21 Jul 1984 |
| (Scotland) Stuart MacIver | (Scotland) Duntocher BC | 4 Aug 1984 |
| (Scotland) Alan Kay | (Scotland) Partick Thistle | 11 Aug 1984 |
| (Scotland) Gordon Arthur | (Scotland) Stirling Albion | 25 Aug 1984 |
| (Scotland) Dougie McNab | (Scotland) Hamilton (loan) | 1 Sep 1984 |
| (Scotland) Graeme Sinclair | (Scotland) Celtic (loan) | 22 Feb 1985 |

=== Players out ===
| Player | To | Date |
|---|---|---|
| (Scotland) Albert Burnett | (Scotland) Falkirk | 3 Aug 1984 |
| (Scotland) Tom Carson | (Scotland) Dundee | 8 Aug 1984 |
| (Scotland) Joe Carson | (Scotland) Partick Thistle | 11 Aug 1984 |
| (Scotland) Dougie McNab | (Scotland) Meadowbank Thistle | 1 Sep 1984 |
| (Scotland) Jim Hughes | (Scotland) Ardrossan Winton Rovers | 3 Apr 1985 |
| (Scotland) Joe McGrogan | (Scotland) Vale of Leven | |
| (Scotland) Martin Walsh | (Scotland) Campsie Black Watch | |
| (Scotland) Rob Campbell | | |
| (Scotland) Colin McKenzie | | |

== Reserve team ==
Dumbarton competed in the Scottish Premier Reserve League, winning 4 and drawing 5 of 36 matches finishing 10th of 10.

In the Reserve League Cup Dumbarton lost in the second round to Aberdeen and in the Second XI Cup lost out to Motherwell in the first round.

== Trivia ==
- The League Cup match against Queen of the South on 22 August marked Martin McGowan's 100th appearance for Dumbarton in all national competitions - the 89th Dumbarton player to reach this milestone.
- The League Cup match against Queen of the South on 22 August also marked John Bourke's 200th appearance for Dumbarton in all national competitions - the 18th Dumbarton player to break the 'double century'.
- The League match against Aberdeen on 22 September marked Joe Coyle's 200th appearance for Dumbarton in all national competitions - the 19th Dumbarton player to break the 'double century'.
- The League match against Rangers on 20 October marked Albert Craig's 100th appearance for Dumbarton in all national competitions - the 90th Dumbarton player to reach this milestone.

== See also ==
- 1984–85 in Scottish football
