= 1983–84 Dumbarton F.C. season =

Dumbarton
1983–1984 season
- Manager: Billy Lamont/ Davie Wilson
- Stadium: Boghead Park, Dumbarton
- Scottish League Division 1: 2nd
- Scottish Cup: Fourth Round
- Scottish League Cup: First Round
- Top goalscorer: League: Joe Coyle (14); All: Joe Coyle (15)
- Highest home attendance: 3,000
- Lowest home attendance: 400
- Average home league attendance: 1,200

Season 1983–84 was the 100th football season in which Dumbarton competed at a Scottish national level, entering the Scottish Football League for the 78th time, the Scottish Cup for the 89th time and the Scottish League Cup for the 37th time.

== Overview ==
At the ninth time of asking, and in what was the club's 100th year of competitive football, Dumbarton managed to achieve that elusive promotion and a place in next season's Premier Division, although it was not to prove to be all 'plain sailing'. Indeed, after 6 games, with 3 wins, it was turning out as another average 'middle of the table' campaign. However an unbeaten run of 12 games was to follow, changing the club's fortunes and Dumbarton were suddenly up there with the 'front runners' - and then disaster struck. Billy Lamont resigned his managerial post to take up the reins at fellow Division 1 club Falkirk F.C. Dumbarton had a new manager in Davie Wilson in place within two weeks, and the club guaranteed promotion with 2 games to play, although they were unable to catch champions Greenock Morton F.C., who finished 3 points ahead.

In the Scottish Cup, after a fine win over Raith Rovers, Dumbarton lost to Division 1 'champions in waiting', Morton in the fourth round.

The League Cup format was again reorganised, with a first round being played before sectional games were introduced. However the first tie against Premier Division Hibernian was to prove too much of a hurdle to get over.

Locally, in the Stirlingshire Cup, Dumbarton released their grip on the trophy with a loss in the first round to Alloa.

== Results & fixtures ==
Win Draw Loss

=== Scottish First Division ===
20 August 1983 First Division	Dumbarton	2–0	Clydebank	Boghead Park
	Coyle,T 35', 88'			Attendance: 1,789; Referee: A McMonigle

3 September 1983 First Division	Ayr United	1–2	Dumbarton	Somerset Park
	McNaughton 65'		Bourke 1'; Coyle,J 33' (pen.)	Attendance: 1,015; Referee: W McLeish

10 September 1983 First Division	Dumbarton	0–1	Partick Thistle	Boghead Park
			Doyle 44'	Attendance: 2,000; Referee: M Delaney

14 September 1983 First Division	Dumbarton	1–2	Brechin City	Boghead Park
	McGowan,P 25'		Fleming 56'; Eadie 70'	Attendance: 450; Referee: E Brolls

17 September 1983 First Division	Meadowbank Thistle	0–2	Dumbarton	Meadowbank Stadium
			Coyle,J 24'; Bourke 62'	Attendance: 450; Referee: A Roy

24 September 1983 First Division	Falkirk	4–1	Dumbarton	Brockville Park
	Grant 16'; Irvine 44'; Houston 52', 80'		Coyle,J 57' (pen.)	Attendance: 1,200; Referee: B McGinlay

28 September 1983 First Division	Dumbarton	2–0	Hamilton	Boghead Park
	Coyle,J 46' (pen.); Ashwood 77'			Attendance: 400; Referee: J Timmons

1 October 1983 First Division	Dumbarton	2–1	Raith Rovers	Boghead Park
	McNeil 11'; Ashwood 52'		Kerr 4'	Attendance: 550; Referee: A McGunnigle

8 October 1983 First Division	Morton	2–2	Dumbarton	Cappielow Park
	Robertson 3'; Clinging 7'		Bourke 29', 33'	Attendance: 1,500; Referee: A Huett

15 October 1983 First Division	Dumbarton	1–0	Clyde	Boghead Park
	Ashwood 32'			Attendance: 500; Referee: J Renton

22 October 1983 First Division	Kilmarnock	2–2	Dumbarton	Rugby Park
	McDicken 57'; Bryson 68'		Ashwood 53'; McNeil 71'	Attendance: 1,500; Referee: H Williamson

29 October 1983 First Division	Dumbarton	1–1	Alloa Athletic	Boghead Park
	Ashwood 89' (pen.)		Purdie 44'	Attendance: 700; Referee: W Crombie

5 November 1983 First Division	Airdrie	1–1	Dumbarton	Broomfield Park
	Sinclair 43'		Bourke 1'	Attendance: 1,100; Referee: D Downie

12 November 1983 First Division	Brechin City	2–3	Dumbarton	Glebe Park, Brechin
	Elvin 14'; Hyslop 87'		Coyle,J 26' (pen.); Coyle,T 33'	Attendance: 700; Referee: D Galloway

19 November 1983 First Division	Dumbarton	0–0	Meadowbank Thistle	Boghead Park
				Attendance: 600; Referee: B Robertson

26 November 1983 First Division	Dumbarton	1–1	Morton	Boghead Park
	Ashwood 81'		Robertson 5'	Attendance: 1,500; Referee: H Young

3 December 1983 First Division	Raith Rovers	1–3	Dumbarton	Starks Park
	Smith 67'		Ashwood 32'; Bourke 51'; Coyle,J 54'	Attendance: 750; Referee: G Smith

10 December 1983 First Division	Dumbarton	3–0	Falkirk	Boghead Park
	Coyle,J 38' (pen.), 75'; McGowan,M 88'			Attendance: 1,500; Referee: L Thow

17 December 1983 First Division	Hamilton	4–1	Dumbarton	Douglas Park
	Forsyth 30'; Hutchenson 34' (pen.); McNaught 41'; Kean 63'		Ashwood 86'	Attendance: 940; Referee: W Knowles

26 December 1983 First Division	Partick Thistle	1–0	Dumbarton	Firhill Park
	Buckley 79'			Attendance: 3,821; Referee: E Brolls

31 December 1983 First Division	Dumbarton	2–1	Ayr United	Boghead Park
	Bourke 40'; Montgomerie		Connor	Attendance: 1,250; Referee: R Cathcart

2 January 1984 First Division	Clydebank	0–2	Dumbarton	Kilbowie Park
			Coyle,J 34' (pen.); Robertson 77'	Attendance: 1,040; Referee: C Sinclair

7 January 1984 First Division	Dumbarton	4–3	Kilmarnock	Boghead Park
	Coyle,T 21'; Ashwood 26'; Bourke 28'; Coyle,J 73'		McClurg 32', 46'; McGivern 82'	Attendance: 1,000; Referee: D Syme

4 February 1984 First Division	Dumbarton	4–2	Airdrie	Boghead Park
	Coyle,J 52'; Crawley 63'; Anderson 75' (o.g.); Robertson 87'		Flood 30'; Yule 33'	Attendance: 1,000; Referee: W Crombie

11 February 1984 First Division	Hamilton	3–3	Dumbarton	Douglas Park
	Phillips 8', 55'; Forsyth 40'		Bourke 2'; McNeil 47'; Robertson 58'	Attendance: 1,015; Referee: T Muirhead

21 February 1984 First Division	Alloa Athletic	1–0	Dumbarton	Recreation Park, Alloa
	Paterson 18'			Attendance: 459; Referee: G Smith

25 February 1984 First Division	Dumbarton	3–1	Raith Rovers	Boghead Park
	Bourke 8', 71'; Craig 42'		Marshall 15'	Attendance: 750; Referee: G Smith

29 February 1984 First Division	Clyde	0–0	Dumbarton	Shawfield Stadium
				Attendance: 970; Referee: M Delaney

3 March 1984 First Division	Dumbarton	2–0	Falkirk	Boghead Park
	Ashwood 57'; Coyle,J 59'			Attendance: 1,050; Referee: B Robertson

10 March 1984 First Division	Kilmarnock	0–0	Dumbarton	Rugby Park
				Attendance: 1,140; Referee: D Yeats

17 March 1984 First Division	Dumbarton	3–0	Meadowbank Thistle	Boghead Park
	Bourke 16', 33'; Robertson 35'			Attendance: 1,200; Referee: K Hope

24 March 1984 First Division	Partick Thistle	0–0	Dumbarton	Firhill Park
				Attendance: 4,156; Referee: H Alexander

31 March 1984 First Division	Dumbarton	2–0	Alloa Athletic	Boghead Park
	Ashwood 13'; McCaig 50'			Attendance: 1,000; Referee: A Ferguson

7 April 1984 First Division	Dumbarton	2–1	Clydebank	Boghead Park
	McCaig 8'; Coyle,T 79'		Given 40' (pen.)	Attendance: 978; Referee: T Muirhead

14 April 1984 First Division	Morton	2–0	Dumbarton	Cappielow Park
	Rooney 25'; Doak 57'			Attendance: 3,850; Referee: J Duncan

21 April 1984 First Division	Brechin City	0–3	Dumbarton	Glebe Park, Brechin
			Coyle,T 34'; Coyle,J 48' (pen.); McCaig 79'	Attendance: 700; Referee: A Waddell

28 April 1984 First Division	Dumbarton	2–2	Clyde	Boghead Park
	Craig 68'; Coyle,T 78'		Docherty 30'; Deans 57'	Attendance: 2,900; Referee: L Thow

5 May 1984 First Division	Airdrie	1–4	Dumbarton	Broomfield Park
	Fairlie 10'		Craig 24', 47'; Walsh 27'; Ashwood 45'	Attendance: 2,000; Referee: D Galloway

12 May 1984 First Division	Dumbarton	0–3	Ayr United	Boghead Park
			Connor 39', 45'; McNally 81'	Attendance: 3,000; Referee: D Downie

=== Scottish League Cup ===
24 August 1983 League Cup R1(1)	Hibernian	5–0	Dumbarton	Easter Road
	Irvine 17', 51', 85'; Clougherty 28' (o.g.); Thomson 53'			Attendance: 2,193; Referee: K Hope

27 August 1983 League Cup R1(2)	Dumbarton	1–2 (1–7 agg.)	Hibernian	Boghead Park
	McGrogan 46'		Irvine 9'; Conroy 56'	Attendance: 760; Referee: B Robertson

=== Scottish Cup ===
6 February 1984 Cup R3	Raith Rovers	1–4	Dumbarton	Starks Park
	Smith 70'		Coyle,J 10'; Bourke 57'; Ashwood 72', 89'	Attendance: 1,950; Referee: D McVicar

18 February 1984 Cup R4	Morton	2–1	Dumbarton	Cappielow Park
	Pettigrew 43', 71'		Craig 41'	Attendance: 3,383; Referee: L Thow

=== Stirlingshire Cup ===
10 August 1983 First Round	Alloa Athletic	3–2	Dumbarton	Recreation Park, Alloa
	Paterson; Cole; Thompson		McCaig; McGrogan

=== Pre-season matches ===
8 August 1983 Friendly	Dumbarton	1–3	(England) Hartlepool United	Boghead Park
	McGowan,M 16'		Waddell 5'; Johnston 49'; Buckley 81'

17 August 1983 Friendly	Dumbarton	1–0	Celtic XI	Boghead Park
	McGowan,P

== League table ==
Pos	Team	Pld	W	D	L	GF	GA	GD	Pts	Promotion or relegation
1	Morton (C, P)	39	21	12	6	75	46	+29	54	Promotion to the Premier Division
2	Dumbarton (P)	39	20	11	8	66	44	+22	51	Promotion to the Premier Division
3	Partick Thistle	39	19	8	12	67	50	+17	46	
4	Clydebank	39	16	13	10	62	50	+12	45	
5	Brechin City	39	14	14	11	56	58	−2	42	

Source: RSSSF and statto
Rules for classification: 1) points; 2) goal difference; 3) number of goals scored.
(C) Champions; (P) Promoted

== Player statistics ==
=== Squad ===
No.	Pos	Nat	Player	Total		First Division		Scottish Cup		League Cup	
No.	Pos	Nat	Player	Apps	Goals	Apps	Goals	Apps	Goals	Apps	Goals
	GK	(Scotland) SCO	Tom Carson	40	0	37	0	1	0	2	0
	GK	(Scotland) SCO	Jim Stewart	3	0	2	0	1	0	0	0
	DF	(Scotland) SCO	Martin McGowan	35	1	34	1	1	0	0	0
	DF	(Scotland) SCO	Ray Montgomerie	43	1	39	1	2	0	2	0
	MF	(Scotland) SCO	Albert Burnett	14	0	8+4	0	1	0	1	0
	MF	(Scotland) SCO	Joe Carson	5	0	5	0	0	0	0	0
	MF	(Scotland) SCO	Mark Clougherty	41	0	38	0	2	0	1	0
	MF	(Scotland) SCO	Tommy Coyle	43	7	38+1	7	2	0	2	0
	MF	(Scotland) SCO	Albert Craig	30	5	21+5	4	0+2	1	2	0
	MF	(Scotland) SCO	Jim Hughes	2	0	0+1	0	0	0	0+1	0
	MF	(Scotland) SCO	Dave McCaig	32	3	10+19	3	0+1	0	1+1	0
	MF	(Scotland) SCO	Donald McNeil	36	3	31+1	3	2	0	2	0
	MF	(Scotland) SCO	Stuart Robertson	28	4	23+3	4	2	0	0	0
	MF	(Scotland) SCO	David Stevenson	5	0	1+2	0	0	0	2	0
	FW	(Scotland) SCO	Kenny Ashwood	33	15	31	13	2	2	0	0
	FW	(Scotland) SCO	John Bourke	38	14	34	13	2	1	1+1	0
	FW	(Scotland) SCO	Joe Coyle	41	15	39	14	2	1	0	0
	FW	(Scotland) SCO	Gerry Crawley	29	1	19+6	1	2	0	2	0
	FW	(Scotland) SCO	Pat McGowan	23	1	14+7	1	0	0	2	0
	FW	(Scotland) SCO	Joe McGrogan	9	1	2+6	0	0	0	1	1
	FW	(Scotland) SCO	Allan Moore	5	0	2+2	0	0	0	0+1	0
	FW	(Scotland) SCO	Martin Walsh	2	1	1+1	1	0	0	0	0

=== Transfers ===
Amongst those players joining and leaving the club were the following:

==== Players in ====
Player	From	Date
(Scotland) Gerry Crawley	(Scotland) Queen's Park	26 Jul 1983
(Scotland) Allan Moore	(Scotland) Possilpark YMCA	6 Aug 1983
(Scotland) Joe Coyle	(Scotland) Airdrie	17 Aug 1983
(Scotland) Stuart Robertson	(England) Doncaster Rovers	16 Sep 1983
(Scotland) Kenny Ashwood	(Scotland) Falkirk	27 Sep 1983
(Scotland) Joe Carson	(Scotland) Motherwell	24 Mar 1984

==== Players out ====
Player	To	Date
(Scotland) Ally Brown	(Scotland) Stirling Albion	23 Jul 1983
(Scotland) Mick Dunlop	(Scotland) Queen of the South	9 Aug 1983
(Scotland) David Stevenson	(Scotland) Falkirk	8 Oct 1983
(Scotland) Mike Rankin	(Scotland) Amateur	2 Dec 1983

== Reserve team ==
Dumbarton competed in the Scottish Reserve League First Division (West), which was split into winter and spring series.

In the first series, of 12 fixtures, 6 were won and 3 drawn - and Dumbarton finished 5th of 13. In the second series, 4 games were won and 2 drawn of 10 ties - but the league was never completed.

== Trivia ==
- Between the league game against Raith Rovers on 25 February and the league game against Clydebank on 7 April, Tom Carson did not concede a single goal - a record of 655 minutes.
- The League match against Hamilton on 11 February marked Pat McGowan's 100th appearance for Dumbarton in all national competitions - the 88th Dumbarton player to reach this milestone.
- The League match against Raith Rovers on 25 February marked Donald McNeil's 200th appearance for Dumbarton in all national competitions - the 17th Dumbarton player to break the 'double century'.

== See also ==
- 1983–84 in Scottish football
