= 1982–83 Dumbarton F.C. season =

Dumbarton
1982–1983 season
- Manager: Billy Lamont
- Stadium: Boghead Park, Dumbarton
- Scottish League Division 1: 7th
- Scottish Cup: Third Round
- Scottish League Cup: Prelims
- Top goalscorer: League: Raymond Blair (10); All: John Donnelly (13)
- Highest home attendance: 4,000
- Lowest home attendance: 400
- Average home league attendance: 960

Season 1982–83 was the 99th football season in which Dumbarton competed at a Scottish national level, entering the Scottish Football League for the 77th time, the Scottish Cup for the 88th time and the Scottish League Cup for the 36th time.

== Overview ==
For the eighth year in a row, Dumbarton played league football in Division 1, and after last season's disappointment, it was hoped that this season might bring the long hoped for promotion. Indeed, with only one defeat in the first eight games, confidence was high. However, results became mixed thereafter, and it was to be a mid-table 7th-place finish with 36 points, 22 behind champions St Johnstone.

In the Scottish Cup, Dumbarton fell at the first hurdle to fellow Division 1 opponents, Airdrie.

The League Cup was always going to be a challenge, with three Premier Division teams in the qualifying section - and this is how it was to prove, with all six matches ending in defeat - though it should be said that in none of the games were Dumbarton humiliated.

Locally, in the Stirlingshire Cup, Dumbarton reached the final for the third year in a row, and regained the trophy with a win over Stenhousemuir.

== Results & fixtures ==
Win Draw Loss

=== Scottish First Division ===
4 September 1982 First Division	Airdrie	1–2	Dumbarton	Broomfield Park
	Coyle 47' (o.g.)		Stevenson 32'; Blair 61'	Attendance: 1,200; Referee: A Duncan

11 September 1982 First Division	Dumbarton	5–1	Falkirk	Boghead Park
	Craig 1', 9', 45'; Donnelly 23'; Stevenson 76'		Ward 73'	Attendance: 550; Referee: E Pringle

15 September 1982 First Division	Clydebank	5–1	Dumbarton	Kilbowie Park
	Coyne 21', 69'; Ronald 52'; Williamson 54'; Given 73'		Dunlop 29'	Attendance: 656

18 September 1982 First Division	Dumbarton	1–1	Dunfermline Athletic	Boghead Park
	Donnelly 76' (pen.)		Jenkins 84'	Attendance: 450; Referee: L Thow

25 September 1982 First Division	Dumbarton	4–1	St Johnstone	Boghead Park
	Dunlop 10'; Stevenson 28'; Blair 46', 82'		Brogan 65'	Attendance: 1,000; Referee: D Syme

29 September 1982 First Division	Dumbarton	1–0	Ayr United	Boghead Park
	Donnelly 70'			Attendance: 600; Referee: T Muirhead

2 October 1982 First Division	Clyde	0–4	Dumbarton	Shawfield Stadium
			Donnelly 6', 27', 41'; Blair 78'	Attendance: 607; Referee: A Ferguson

6 October 1982 First Division	Hearts	1–1	Dumbarton	Tynecastle Stadium
	O'Connor 66'		Donnelly 73'	Attendance: 4,300; Referee: H Young

9 October 1982 First Division	Dumbarton	1–5	Hamilton	Boghead Park
	Brown 73'		Donnelly 13'; McNaught 62'; Craig 69'; Fairlie 80'; Murphy 86'	Attendance: 800; Referee: H Alexander

16 October 1982 First Division	Raith Rovers	3–0	Dumbarton	Starks Park
	Russell 15'; Spence 52'; Harris 65'			Attendance: 500; Referee: I Cathcart

23 October 1982 First Division	Dumbarton	1–1	Partick Thistle	Boghead Park
	Stevenson 74'		Watson 49' (pen.)	Attendance: 1,500; Referee: M Delaney

30 October 1982 First Division	Alloa Athletic	2–0	Dumbarton	Recreation Park, Alloa
	Purdie 16'; Holt 52'			Attendance: 557; Referee: C Sinclair

6 November 1982 First Division	Dumbarton	1–1	Queen's Park	Boghead Park
	Stevenson 31'		Grant 35'	Attendance: 600; Referee: A Williamson

13 November 1982 First Division	Ayr United	0–1	Dumbarton	Somerset Park
			Stevenson 80'	Attendance: 938; Referee: E Pringle

20 November 1982 First Division	Dunfermline Athletic	0–3	Dumbarton	East End Park
			Blair 16', 90'; Stevenson 41'	Attendance: 1,200; Referee: A Huett

27 November 1982 First Division	Dumbarton	1–1	Hearts	Boghead Park
	Blair 61'		O'Connor 89'	Attendance: 3,000; Referee: J Renton

4 December 1982 First Division	Dumbarton	1–3	Clyde	Boghead Park
	Craig 74'		Masterton 27', 36'; Reilly 70'	Attendance: 500; Referee: B McGinlay

11 December 1982 First Division	St Johnstone	1–0	Dumbarton	Muirton Park
	Brogan 40'			Attendance: 2,042; Referee: H Alexander

27 December 1982 First Division	Falkirk	2–1	Dumbarton	Brockville Park
	Mackin 52'; Jobson 76'		Dunlop 58'	Attendance: 1,789

1 January 1983 First Division	Dumbarton	0–4	Clydebank	Boghead Park
			Hughes 1'; Williamson 60', 71'; Coyne 89'	Attendance: 1,000; Referee: E Brolis

3 January 1983 First Division	Queen's Park	2–1	Dumbarton	Hampden Park
	Crawley 77', 83'		Montgomerie 9'	Attendance: 740; Referee: W McLeish

8 January 1983 First Division	Dumbarton	2–1	Raith Rovers	Boghead Park
	Stevenson 43'; Close 48'		Russell 39'	Attendance: 500; Referee: A Waddell

15 January 1983 First Division	Hamilton	0–3	Dumbarton	Douglas Park
			Blair 74', 83'; Donnelly 89'	Attendance: 724; Referee: M Delaney

22 January 1983 First Division	Dumbarton	1–2	Alloa Athletic	Boghead Park
	Craig 24'		Houston 69'; Campbell 81'	Attendance: 450; Referee: C White

5 February 1983 First Division	Partick Thistle	3–2	Dumbarton	Firhill Park
	McDonald 15'; Park 67', 85'		Craig 26'; McGowan,P 60'	Attendance: 1,789; Referee: H Young

12 February 1983 First Division	Dumbarton	2–1	Queen's Park	Boghead Park
	Coyle 36'; Blair 88'		McNiven 89'	Attendance: 600; Referee: B McGinlay

23 February 1983 First Division	Dumbarton	0–0	Airdrie	Boghead Park
				Attendance: 1,020

26 February 1983 First Division	Clydebank	3–1	Dumbarton	Kilbowie Park
	McLeish 2'; Given 58'; Coyne 61'		McGowan,M 14'	Attendance: 656; Referee: A McLeish

5 March 1983 First Division	Clyde	1–0	Dumbarton	Shawfield Stadium
	Dempsey 49'			Attendance: 450; Referee: J Renton

12 March 1983 First Division	Dumbarton	1–3	Dunfermline Athletic	Boghead Park
	Close 68'		Cathie 38'; Forrest 65'; Hamill 80'	Attendance: 500; Referee: D Syme

19 March 1983 First Division	Alloa Athletic	0–0	Dumbarton	Recreation Park, Alloa
				Attendance: 647; Referee: A McGunnigle

26 March 1983 First Division	Airdrie	1–1	Dumbarton	Broomfield Park
	Flood 38'		Rodger 14' (o.g.)	Attendance: 450; Referee: E Brolis

2 April 1983 First Division	Ayr United	1–2	Dumbarton	Somerset Park
	Ward 57'		Stevenson 22'; McGowan,P 63'	Attendance: 900; Referee: B Robertson

9 April 1983 First Division	Raith Rovers	0–0	Dumbarton	Starks Park
				Attendance: 600; Referee: D Ramsay

16 April 1983 First Division	Dumbarton	1–1	Hamilton	Boghead Park
	Montgomerie 22'		Hamill 79'	Attendance: 400; Referee: I Cathcart

23 April 1983 First Division	St Johnstone	1–0	Dumbarton	Muirton Park
	Gibson 90'			Attendance: 2,317; Referee: W Knowles

30 April 1983 First Division	Dumbarton	2–1	Partick Thistle	Boghead Park
	McCaig 40'; McGowan,P 56'		Johnston 68'	Attendance: 1,200; Referee: W McLeish

7 May 1983 First Division	Dumbarton	0–4	Hearts	Boghead Park
			Robertson 13', 19'; O'Connor 63'; Mackay 89'	Attendance: 4,000; Referee: A Ferguson

14 May 1983 First Division	Falkirk	1–2	Dumbarton	Brockville Park
	McCulley 49' (pen.)		Craig 29'; McGrogan 89'	Attendance: 1,800; Referee: L Thow

=== Scottish League Cup ===
14 August 1982 Section 2	Dumbarton	1–3	Morton	Boghead Park
	Rankin 12'		Ritchie 71'; Hutcheson 88'; McNeill 89'	Attendance: 850; Referee: W McLeish

18 August 1982 Section 2	Dundee	3–2	Dumbarton	Dens Park
	Ferguson 11', 66'; Mackie 49'		Donnelly 46' (pen.), 82' (pen.)	Attendance: 3,174; Referee: J Renton

21 August 1982 Section 2	Aberdeen	3–0	Dumbarton	Pittodrie Park
	McGhee 5'; Strachan 13', 71'			Attendance: 8,000; Referee: D Downie

25 August 1982 Section 2	Dumbarton	2–3	Dundee	Boghead Park
	Donnelly 46' (pen.), 87' (pen.)		Ferguson 15' (pen.); Fraser 51'; Stephen 86'	Attendance: 433; Referee: A McGunnigle

28 August 1982 Section 2	Morton	4–1	Dumbarton	Cappielow Park
	Rooney 5', 90'; Docherty 24'; McNab 87'		Stevenson 58'	Attendance: 1,250; Referee: C White

9 September 1982 Section 2	Dumbarton	1–2	Aberdeen	Boghead Park
	Donnelly (pen.)		Bell 76'; Hewitt 85'	Attendance: 3,000

=== Scottish Cup ===
29 January 1983 Scottish Cup round 3	Dumbarton	0–1	Airdrie	Boghead Park
			Flood 10'	Attendance: 957; Referee: L Thow

=== Stirlingshire Cup ===
4 August 1982 1st Round	Clydebank	2–5	Dumbarton	Kilbowie Park
	Williamson 53'; McCabe 68'		Donnelly 43', 50' (pen.); Blair 57'; Dunlop 78'; Rankin 85'

7 August 1982 Semi Final	Dumbarton	3–0	Alloa Athletic	Boghead Park
	McGowan,P 23'; McGrogan 35'; Dunlop 41'			Attendance: 200

8 August 1982 Final	Stenhousemuir	1–3	Dumbarton	Ochilview Park
	Goal		Blair 4', 85'; Donnelly 50' (pen.)

== League table ==
Pos	Team	Pld	W	D	L	GF	GA	GD	Pts
5	Airdrieonians	39	16	7	16	62	46	+16	39
6	Alloa Athletic	39	14	11	14	52	52	0	39
7	Dumbarton	39	13	10	16	50	59	−9	36
8	Falkirk	39	15	6	18	45	55	−10	36
9	Raith Rovers	39	13	8	18	64	63	+1	34

Source: RSSSF
Rules for classification: 1) points; 2) goal difference; 3) number of goals scored.

== Player statistics ==
=== Squad ===
No.	Pos	Nat	Player	Total		First Division		Scottish Cup		League Cup	
No.	Pos	Nat	Player	Apps	Goals	Apps	Goals	Apps	Goals	Apps	Goals
	GK	(Scotland) SCO	Murray Bowman	2	0	2	0	0	0	0	0
	GK	(Scotland) SCO	Tom Carson	44	0	37	0	1	0	6	0
	DF	(Scotland) SCO	Martin McGowan	31	1	22+4	1	0	0	4+1	0
	DF	(Scotland) SCO	Ray Montgomerie	28	2	25	2	1	0	1+1	0
	MF	(Scotland) SCO	Albert Burnett	37	0	28+3	0	1	0	4+1	0
	MF	(Scotland) SCO	Frank Close	22	2	15+2	2	1	0	4	0
	MF	(Scotland) SCO	Mark Clougherty	40	0	36	0	0	0	4	0
	MF	(Scotland) SCO	Tommy Coyle	45	1	38	1	1	0	6	0
	MF	(Scotland) SCO	Albert Craig	38	7	23+9	7	1	0	3+2	0
	MF	(Scotland) SCO	Jim Hughes	3	0	3	0	0	0	0	0
	MF	(Scotland) SCO	Dave McCaig	8	1	7+1	1	0	0	0	0
	MF	(Scotland) SCO	Colin McKenzie	1	0	1	0	0	0	0	0
	MF	(Scotland) SCO	Donald McNeil	31	0	27+1	0	1	0	2	0
	MF	(Scotland) SCO	David Stevenson	43	10	29+9	9	0+1	0	3+1	1
	MF	(Scotland) SCO	Tom Walker	3	0	0	0	0	0	3	0
	FW	(Scotland) SCO	Raymond Blair	36	10	28+1	10	1	0	5+1	0
	FW	(Scotland) SCO	John Bourke	8	0	7+1	0	0	0	0	0
	FW	(Scotland) SCO	Ally Brown	24	1	12+5	1	1	0	5+1	0
	FW	(Scotland) SCO	John Donnelly	35	13	28	8	1	0	6	5
	FW	(Scotland) SCO	Mick Dunlop	31	3	18+6	3	1	0	5+1	0
	FW	(Scotland) SCO	Alf Holton	1	0	1	0	0	0	0	0
	FW	(Scotland) SCO	Tom McAteer	1	0	1	0	0	0	0	0
	FW	(Scotland) SCO	Bob McCulley	3	0	3	0	0	0	0	0
	FW	(Scotland) SCO	Pat McGowan	37	1	31+3	1	0+1	0	2	0
	FW	(Scotland) SCO	Joe McGrogan	17	1	7+7	1	0	0	2+1	0
	FW	(Scotland) SCO	Mike Rankin	1	1	0	0	0	0	1	1

=== Transfers ===
Amongst those players joining and leaving the club were the following:

==== Players in ====
Player	From	Date
(Scotland) Joe McGrogan	(Scotland) Hamilton	4 Aug 1982
(Scotland) Albert Burnett	(Scotland) Airdrie	6 Aug 1982
(Scotland) David Stevenson	(Scotland) Lesmahagow	21 Aug 1982
(Scotland) Dave McCaig	(Scotland) East Stirling	14 Mar 1983
(Scotland) John Bourke	(Scotland) Kilmarnock	18 Mar 1983
(Scotland) Jim Hughes	(Scotland) Ferguslie BC	31 Mar 1983

==== Players out ====
Player	To	Date
(Scotland) Rob Campbell	(Scotland) Cowdenbeath	1 Jul 1982
(Scotland) Joe Coyle	(Scotland) Airdrie	30 Jul 1982
(Scotland) Ally McRoberts	(Scotland) Stirling Albion	2 Aug 1982
(Scotland) Graeme Sinclair	(Scotland) Celtic	12 Aug 1982
(Scotland) John Donnelly	(England) Leeds Utd	5 Mar 1983
(Scotland) Raymond Blair	(Scotland) St Johnstone	11 Mar 1983

== Reserve team ==
Dumbarton competed in the Scottish Reserve League First Division (West) - Second Series, winning 1 and drawing 5 of 12 games - finishing 13th of 13.

== Trivia ==
- The League match against Clyde on 2 October marked Tom Carson's 100th appearance for Dumbarton in all national competitions - the 86th Dumbarton player to reach this milestone.
- The League match against Raith Rovers on 16 October marked Raymond Blair's 200th appearance for Dumbarton in all national competitions - the 16th Dumbarton player to break the 'double century'.
- The final League match against Falkirk on 14 May marked Mark Clougherty's 100th appearance for Dumbarton in all national competitions - the 87th Dumbarton player to reach this milestone.

== See also ==
- 1982–83 in Scottish football
