= 1979–80 Dumbarton F.C. season =

Dumbarton
1979–1980 season
- Manager: Davie Wilson
- Stadium: Boghead Park, Dumbarton
- Scottish League Division 1: 4th
- Scottish Cup: Third Round
- Scottish League Cup: First Round
- Top goalscorer: League: Graeme Sharp (15); All: Graeme Sharp (15)
- Highest home attendance: 4,500
- Lowest home attendance: 500
- Average home league attendance: 1,560

Season 1979–80 was the 96th football season in which Dumbarton competed at a Scottish national level, entering the Scottish Football League for the 74th time, the Scottish Cup for the 85th time and the Scottish League Cup for the 33rd time.

== Overview ==
For the fifth year running, Dumbarton played league football in Division 1, and after a promising start to the campaign, there was a real feeling that promotion could be achieved, particularly with the club topping the division at Christmas. However, a run of 7 games where only one win was registered, damped spirits, and following a 1–4 defeat to Arbroath, manager Davie Wilson was sacked. Nevertheless, with John Cushley as caretaker manager, 3 wins in the last 3 matches were sufficient to secure 4th place.

In the Scottish Cup, Dumbarton lost out to fellow Division 1 opponents Ayr United.

Similarly in the League Cup, Dumbarton were to fall at the first hurdle to St Johnstone.

Locally, in the Stirlingshire Cup, Dumbarton had to give second-best to local rivals Clydebank in the semi-final in a penalty shoot out after a drawn match.

Note that at the start of the season, Dumbarton embarked on a tour of Ireland which took in 3 matches, all of which were won.

== Results & fixtures ==
Win Draw Loss

=== Scottish First Division ===
11 August 1979 Scottish Division 1	Ayr United	1–2	Dumbarton	Somerset Park
	McLaughlin 89' (pen.)		Sharp 7', 23'	Attendance: 2,647; Referee: K Stewart

18 August 1979 Scottish Division 1	Dumbarton	3-2	Hamilton	Boghead Park
	Gallacher, B 21'; Sharp 33'; Blair 52'		Sweeney 61'; Graham 63'	Attendance: 1,000; Referee: D Murdoch

25 August 1979 Scottish Division 1	Clydebank	2–1	Dumbarton	Kilbowie Park
	Sweeney 36'; Miller 70'		Whiteford, D 86'	Attendance: 2,000; Referee: A McFaul

1 September 1979 Scottish Division 1	Dumbarton	4-1	Berwick Rangers	Boghead Park
	Gallacher, B 5'; Blair 14'; Sharp 39', 85'		Tait 59'	Attendance: 1,000; Referee: L Thow

5 September 1979 Scottish Division 1	Clyde	0–2	Dumbarton	Shawfield Stadium
			Brogan 15' (o.g.); Gallacher, B 77'	Attendance: 1,000; Referee: J Simmons

8 September 1979 Scottish Division 1	Dumbarton	1-2	Stirling Albion	Boghead Park
	Gallacher, B 72'		Armstrong 53' (pen.); Kennedy, A 61'	Attendance: 1,200; Referee: F McKenzie

15 September 1979 Scottish Division 1	Airdrie	1–0	Dumbarton	Broomfield Park
	McClymont 18'			Attendance: 2,000; Referee: E Pringle

19 September 1979 Scottish Division 1	Dunfermline Athletic	1–3	Dumbarton	East End Park
	Leonard 23'		Sharp 23', 85'; Whiteford, D 68'	Attendance: 2,456; Referee: A Harris

22 September 1979 Scottish Division 1	Dumbarton	1-0	Arbroath	Boghead Park
	Coyle, J 12'			Attendance: 900; Referee: B McGinlay

29 September 1979 Scottish Division 1	Motherwell	3–0	Dumbarton	Fir Park
	irvine 28'; Clinging 33'; McLaughlin 67'			Attendance: 3,501; Referee: E Pringle

6 October 1979 Scottish Division 1	Dumbarton	1-1	Hearts	Boghead Park
	Sinclair 35' (o.g.)		McCluskey 72' (pen.)	Attendance: 3,500; Referee: F McKenzie

13 October 1979 Scottish Division 1	Dumbarton	4-2	Raith Rovers	Boghead Park
	McCluskey 18', 72' (pen.), 75' (pen.); Blair 76'		Wallace 52'; Ford 85'	Attendance: 2,000; Referee: T Muirhead

20 October 1979 Scottish Division 1	St Johnstone	2–4	Dumbarton	Muirton Park
	Brannigan 39'; Lawson 57'		Gallacher, B 8'; Sharp 15'; Blair 35'; Coyle, J 84'	Attendance: 2,056; Referee: L Thow

27 October 1979 Scottish Division 1	Hamilton	1–0	Dumbarton	Douglas Park
	McCulloch 67'			Attendance: 3,000; Referee: R Cuthill

3 November 1979 Scottish Division 1	Dumbarton	1-0	Clydebank	Boghead Park
	Sharp 64'			Attendance: 1,200; Referee: J Timmons

10 November 1979 Scottish Division 1	Stirling Albion	2–3	Dumbarton	Annfield Stadium
	Irvine 3'; Kennedy 34'		McCluskey 36' (pen.), 65'; Sharp 44'	Attendance: 1,000; Referee: I Foote

17 November 1979 Scottish Division 1	Airdrie	0–0	Dumbarton	Broomfield Park
				Attendance: 3,500; Referee: A Harris

24 November 1979 Scottish Division 1	Dumbarton	2-1	Dunfermline Athletic	Boghead Park
	Gallacher, B 45'; Sharp 57'		O'Brien 50'	Attendance: 1,200; Referee: D Ramsay

1 December 1979 Scottish Division 1	Dumbarton	1-1	Motherwell	Boghead Park
	Gallacher, B 43' (pen.)		McLaughlin 52' (pen.)	Attendance: 2,000; Referee: H Alexander

8 December 1979 Scottish Division 1	Hearts	1–0	Dumbarton	Tynecastle Stadium
	O'Sullivan 89'			Attendance: 5,600; Referee: A Ferguson

15 December 1979 Scottish Division 1	Raith Rovers	0–1	Dumbarton	Starks Park
			Sharp 45'	Attendance: 1,100; Referee: G Smith

29 December 1979 Scottish Division 1	Dumbarton	4-0	Hamilton	Boghead Park
	McNeil 7'; Blair 57'; Sharp 74'; Coyle, J 87'			Attendance: 2,500; Referee: T Muirhead

5 January 1980 Scottish Division 1	Dumbarton	0-1	Stirling Albion	Boghead Park
			Beaton 70'	Attendance: 2,500; Referee: A Ferguson

12 January 1980 Scottish Division 1	Dumbarton	0-0	Stirling Albion	Boghead Park
				Attendance: 2,500; Referee: K Stewart

2 February 1980 Scottish Division 1	Berwick Rangers	0–2	Dumbarton	Shielfield Park
			Sharp 15', 81'	Attendance: 962; Referee: W McLeish

9 February 1980 Scottish Division 1	Dumbarton	1-1	Hearts	Boghead Park
	McGrain 80'		Robinson 48'	Attendance: 4,500; Referee: J Renton

16 February 1980 Scottish Division 1	Dumbarton	0-1	St Johnstone	Boghead Park
			Brogan 75'	Attendance: 1,500; Referee: A Waddell

23 February 1980 Scottish Division 1	Raith Rovers	4–0	Dumbarton	Starks Park
	Ballantyne 10', 77' (pen.); Harrow 33'; Carroll 41'			Attendance: 1,899; Referee: A Waddell

1 March 1980 Scottish Division 1	Dumbarton	0-3	Ayr United	Boghead Park
			Morris 60', 73'; McSherry 78'	Attendance: 2,000; Referee: R Cuthill

8 March 1980 Scottish Division 1	Dumbarton	3-1	Clyde	Boghead Park
	McNeil 33', 44'; Coyle, J 72'		McCabe 73' (pen.)	Attendance: 1,000; Referee: D Syme

12 March 1980 Scottish Division 1	Dunfermline Athletic	0–2	Dumbarton	East End Park
			Gallacher, B 52', 57'	Attendance: 2,319; Referee: R Valentine

15 March 1980 Scottish Division 1	Berwick Rangers	3–0	Dumbarton	Shielfield Park
	Smith 18' (pen.); McDowell 29'; Cross			Attendance: 922; Referee: M Delaney

25 March 1980 Scottish Division 1	Dumbarton	2-3	Arbroath	Boghead Park
	McCluskey 51' (pen.); Sharp 87'		Wells 28'; Harley 46'; Yule 47'	Attendance: 500; Referee: C White

29 March 1980 Scottish Division 1	Ayr United	1–0	Dumbarton	Somerset Park
	Connor 76' (pen.)			Attendance: 1,912; Referee: T Kellock

2 April 1980 Scottish Division 1	Clydebank	2–2	Dumbarton	Kilbowie Park
	Fallon 60'; Sweeney 90'		Blair 44'; Sweeney 61'	Attendance: 1,170

5 April 1980 Scottish Division 1	Arnroath	4–1	Dumbarton	Gayfield Park
	Harley 2'; Wilson 41', 83'; Durno 48'		Gallacher, B 74'	Attendance: 750; Referee: A McGunnigle

12 April 1980 Scottish Division 1	Dumbarton	1-0	Motherwell	Boghead Park
	Rankin 20'			Attendance: 800; Referee: T Muirhead

19 April 1980 Scottish Division 1	Dumbarton	5-2	St Johnstone	Boghead Park
	McCluskey 26' (pen.); McGrain 48'; Martin 58'; Gallacher, B 60'; Brown 70'		Brannigan 73'; Muir 89'	Attendance: 500; Referee: P Robertson

26 April 1980 Scottish Division 1	Clyde	1–2	Dumbarton	Shawfield Stadium
	Kean 23'		Blair 49', 82'	Attendance: 1,500; Referee: C White

=== Scottish Cup ===
26 January 1980 Scottish Cup round 3	Dumbarton	1–2	Ayr United	Boghead Park
	Gallacher, B 44'		Armour 14'; Connor 62' (pen.)	Attendance: 2,480; Referee: E Pringle

=== Scottish League Cup ===
15 August 1979 Scottish League Cup round 1(1)	Dumbarton	1–1	Johnstone	Boghead Park
	Brown 67'		Goldthorp 61'	Attendance: 1,200; Referee: A Ferguson

22 August 1979 Scottish League Cup round 1(2)	St Johnstone	3–2 (4–3 agg.)	Dumbarton	Muirton Park
	Brogan 42'; Lawson 55'; Goldthorp 67'		Whiteford, D 19'; Blair 64'	Attendance: 2,634; Referee: C White

=== Stirlingshire Cup ===
30 October 1979 First Round	Dumbarton	2–0	Alloa Athletic	Boghead Park
	Gallacher, J 76'; Henderson 80' (o.g.)			Attendance: 300

26 November 1979 Semi Final	Dumbarton	0–0 (Clydebank on penalties)	Clydebank	Boghead Park
				Attendance: 400

=== Pre-season and other matches ===
31 July 1979 Friendly	(Northern Ireland) Coleraine	2–3	Dumbarton	The Showgrounds (Coleraine)
	Dickson 55', 60'		Gallacher, B 1'; Blair 41'; Sinclair 76'

2 August 1979 Friendly	(Northern Ireland) Finn Harps	0–1	Dumbarton	Finn Park
			Sharp 69'	Referee: T McGovern

5 August 1979 Friendly	(Republic of Ireland) Sligo Rovers	0–5	Dumbarton	The Showgrounds, Sligo Town
			Blair 20'; Gallacher, B 44'; Sharp 45'	Referee: W Attley

13 February 1980 Friendly	Dumbarton	1–1	Rangers	Boghead Park
	Gallacher, B 33'		Boyd 90'	Attendance: 3,000; Referee: B McCluskey

== League table ==
Pos	Team	Pld	W	D	L	GF	GA	GD	Pts	Promotion or relegation
2	Airdrieonians (P)	39	21	9	9	78	47	+31	51	Promotion to the Premier Division
3	Ayr United	39	16	12	11	64	51	+13	44	
4	Dumbarton	39	19	6	14	59	51	+8	44	
5	Raith Rovers	39	14	15	10	54	46	+8	43	
6	Motherwell	39	16	11	12	59	48	+11	43	

Source: RSSSF and statto
Rules for classification: 1) points; 2) goal difference; 3) number of goals scored.
(P) Promoted

== Player statistics ==
=== Squad ===
No.	Pos	Nat	Player	Total		First Division		Scottish Cup		League Cup	
No.	Pos	Nat	Player	Apps	Goals	Apps	Goals	Apps	Goals	Apps	Goals
	GK	(Scotland) SCO	Tom Carson	3	0	3	0	0	0	0	0
	GK	(Scotland) SCO	Donald Hunter	6	0	6	0	0	0	0	0
	GK	(Scotland) SCO	Laurie Williams	33	0	30	0	1	0	2	0
	DF	(Scotland) SCO	Rob Campbell	9	0	8+1	0	0	0	0	0
	DF	(Scotland) SCO	Joe O'Donnell	2	0	0+2	0	0	0	0	0
	MF	(Scotland) SCO	Tommy Coyle	22	0	7+13	0	1+1	0	0	0
	MF	(Scotland) SCO	John Gallacher	41	0	38	0	1	0	2	0
	MF	(Scotland) SCO	Jim Martin	5	1	1+4	1	0	0	0	0
	MF	(Scotland) SCO	Pat McCluskey	38	8	36	8	0	0	2	0
	MF	(Scotland) SCO	Ally MacLeod	36	0	32+1	0	1	0	2	0
	MF	(Scotland) SCO	Donald McNeil	25	4	24+1	4	0	0	0	0
	MF	(Scotland) SCO	Joe Rowan	1	0	0+1	0	0	0	0	0
	MF	(Scotland) SCO	Graeme Sinclair	42	0	39	0	1	0	2	0
	MF	(Scotland) SCO	Derek Whiteford	13	3	11	2	0	0	2	1
	FW	(Scotland) SCO	Raymond Blair	36	9	30+3	8	1	0	2	1
	FW	(Scotland) SCO	Ally Brown	38	2	32+3	1	1	0	2	1
	FW	(Scotland) SCO	Joe Coyle	41	4	37+1	4	1	0	2	0
	FW	(Scotland) SCO	Gerry Findlay	11	0	1+10	0	0	0	0	0
	FW	(Scotland) SCO	Brian Gallacher	42	13	39	12	1	1	2	0
	FW	(Scotland) SCO	Joe Kennedy	1	0	0+1	0	0	0	0	0
	FW	(Scotland) SCO	Tommy McGrain	24	2	20+4	2	0	0	0	0
	FW	(Scotland) SCO	Mike Rankin	2	1	2	1	0	0	0	0
	FW	(Scotland) SCO	Graeme Sharp	36	15	33	15	1	0	2	0

=== International Cap ===
Graeme Sinclair was selected to play for the Scottish League team in a friendly match against the League of Ireland on 17 March 1980 played in Dublin (won by the Irish 2–1).

=== Transfers ===
==== Players in ====
Player	From	Date
(Scotland) Joe Kennedy	(Scotland) Annbank United	2 May 1979
(Scotland) Joe O'Donnell	(Scotland) Hillwood BC	5 Jul 1979
(Scotland) Tommy McGrain	(Republic of Ireland) Sligo Rovers	5 Sep 1979
(Scotland) George Brannigan	(Scotland) Celtic BC	25 Sep 1979
(Scotland) Tom Carson	(Scotland) Vale of Leven	25 Sep 1979
(Scotland) Owen Coyle	(Scotland) Renfrew YM	29 Oct 1979
(Scotland) Jim Martin	(Scotland) Neilston	4 Feb 1980

==== Players out ====
Player	To	Date
(Scotland) Willie Russell	(Scotland) Darvel	4 May 1979
(Scotland) Don Watt	(Scotland) East Stirling	18 May 1979
(Scotland) Dave Govan	(Scotland) Johnstone Burgh	27 Jul 1979
(Scotland) Jocky Whiteford	(Scotland) Rutherglen Glencairn	6 Aug 1979
(Scotland) Derek Whiteford	(Scotland) Falkirk	15 Dec 1979
(Scotland) Graeme Sharp	(England) Everton	4 Apr 1980
(Scotland) Graham Fyfe	(United States) Pittsburgh Spirit	
(Scotland) Hugh McLean	(Scotland) Retired	

== Reserve team ==
Dumbarton competed in the Scottish Reserve League First Division (West).

In the Scottish Second XI Cup, Dumbarton lost to Dundee United in the third round, and in the Reserve League Cup, Dumbarton lost to Ayr United, on aggregate, in the first round.

== Trivia ==
- The League match against Motherwell on 29 September marked Ally Brown's 200th appearance for Dumbarton in all national competitions - the 14th Dumbarton player to break the 'double century'.
- The League match against Hearts on 6 October marked Pat McCluskey's 100th appearance for Dumbarton in all national competitions - the 79th Dumbarton player to reach this milestone.
- The League match against Hamilton on 27 October marked Raymond Blair's 100th appearance for Dumbarton in all national competitions - the 80th Dumbarton player to reach this milestone.
- The League match against Motherwell on 1 December marked Brian Gallacher's 100th appearance for Dumbarton in all national competitions - the 81st Dumbarton player to reach this milestone.
- The fee received of £125,000 for Graeme Sharp's transfer to Everton at the end of the season broke the record set by Murdo MacLeod's departure the previous season.
- Manager Davie Wilson resigned on 4 April and Sean Fallon took over as caretaker until the end of the season - at which time he was confirmed as the manager for the next season.

== See also ==
- 1979–80 in Scottish football
