= 1978–79 Dumbarton F.C. season =

Dumbarton
1978–1979 season
- Manager: Davie Wilson
- Stadium: Boghead Park, Dumbarton
- Scottish League Division 1: 7th
- Scottish Cup: Fifth Round
- Scottish League Cup: First Round
- Top goalscorer: League: Raymond Blair (9); All: Raymond Blair (10)
- Highest home attendance: 3,000
- Lowest home attendance: 300
- Average home league attendance: 1,405

Season 1978–79 was the 95th football season in which Dumbarton competed at a Scottish national level, entering the Scottish Football League for the 73rd time, the Scottish Cup for the 84th time and the Scottish League Cup for the 32nd time.

== Overview ==
For the fourth year in a row, Dumbarton played league football in Division 1, and after the previous season's performances, confidence was high. However, as it took 7 games to register the first league win early hopes were dashed and a disappointing 7th-place finish was achieved.

In the Scottish Cup, for a second year running it was Partick Thistle that were the fifth round opponents and as in the previous year Dumbarton were to lose out.

In the League Cup, in the straight knock-out format, Dumbarton were to draw Premier Division St Mirren in the first round, and were to fall to a two-goal defeat at Love Street after a home no-scoring draw.

Locally, in the Stirlingshire Cup, Dumbarton were once again defeated by local rivals Clydebank, this time in the final.

Finally, Laurie Williams was given a testimonial for his 10 years of service to the club, and he captained Dumbarton against a Scottish League Select - the result being a 1–1 draw with Williams himself scoring the equalising penalty for Dumbarton.

== Results & fixtures ==
Win Draw Loss

=== Scottish First Division ===
12 August 1978 Scottish Division 1	Arbroath	1–1	Dumbarton	Gayfield Park
	Mylles 46'		Blair 23'	Attendance: 1,156; Referee: A Waddell

19 August 1978 Scottish Division 1	Dumbarton	0–1	Stirling Albion	Boghead Park
			Armstrong 89'	Attendance: 1,500; Referee: A Ferguson

26 August 1978 Scottish Division 1	Clydebank	1–1	Dumbarton	Kilbowie Park
	Miller 50'		Brown 14'	Attendance: 2,000; Referee: P Robinson

6 September 1978 Scottish Division 1	Kilmarnock	0–0	Dumbarton	Rugby Park
				Attendance: 2,500; Referee: D Syme

9 September 1978 Scottish Division 1	Dumbarton	1–1	Airdrie	Boghead Park
	McNeil 48'		McCann 68'	Attendance: 2,000; Referee: K Stewart

13 September 1978 Scottish Division 1	Clyde	1–0	Dumbarton	Shawfield Stadium
	Ahern 32' (pen.)			Attendance: 1,200; Referee: D Ramsay

16 September 1978 Scottish Division 1	Ayr United	2–5	Dumbarton	Somerset Park
	McLelland 44'; Phillips 48'		MacLeod, M 50'; Whiteford, D 51', 65', 76'; Muir 71'	Attendance: 2,146; Referee: J Walsh

23 September 1978 Scottish Division 1	Dumbarton	2–0	Hamilton	Boghead Park
	Whiteford, D 43'; Fyfe 75'			Attendance: 1,000; Referee: J Renton

27 September 1978 Scottish Division 1	Dumbarton	0–0	Dundee	Boghead Park
				Attendance: 1,700; Referee: T Kyle

30 September 1978 Scottish Division 1	Dumbarton	4–1	Montrose	Boghead Park
	Fyfe 3'; McCluskey 7' (pen.); Gallacher 11'; McNeil 24'		Georgeson 35'	Attendance: 2,000; Referee: H Alexander

7 October 1978 Scottish Division 1	Raith Rovers	0–0	Dumbarton	Starks Park
				Attendance: 2,720; Referee: E Pringle

14 October 1978 Scottish Division 1	Dumbarton	2–0	St Johnstone	Boghead Park
	Whiteford, D 61'; McLean 69'			Attendance: 1,500; Referee: A Waddell

21 October 1978 Scottish Division 1	St Johnstone	0–2	Dumbarton	Palmerston Park
			McCluskey (pen.); Blair	Attendance: 1,000; Referee: K Hope

28 October 1978 Scottish Division 1	Stirling Albion	1–1	Dumbarton	Annfield Stadium
	Browning 79' (pen.)		Fyfe 9'	Attendance: 1,400; Referee: T Kellock

4 November 1978 Scottish Division 1	Dumbarton	1–2	Clydebank	Boghead Park
	McLean 78'		Given 15'; Miller 28'	Attendance: 5,000; Referee: D Murdoch

11 November 1978 Scottish Division 1	Airdrie	3–6	Dumbarton	Broomfield Park
	Goldthorp 44'; Clark 64' (pen.), 72'		Muir 4'; McCluskey 12' (pen.); Coyle, J 39'; Blair 65', 71', 85'	Attendance: 1,500; Referee: K Stewart

18 November 1978 Scottish Division 1	Dumbarton	2–0	Ayr United	Boghead Park
	Fyfe 67'; B;air 79'			Attendance: 2,500; Referee: C White

25 November 1978 Scottish Division 1	Hamilton	5–0	Dumbarton	Douglas Park
	Graham 27'; Clark 29', 49'; Wright 57'; Glavin 73'			Attendance: 1,500; Referee: A Harris

9 December 1978 Scottish Division 1	Dumbarton	1–3	Raith Rovers	Boghead Park
	Houston 71' (o.g.)		Harrow 19'; Pettie 33'; McDonagh 58'	Attendance: 800; Referee: T Muirhead

16 December 1978 Scottish Division 1	St Johnstone	2–2	Dumbarton	Muirton Park
	Brannagan 51'; Thomas 69'		Sharp 10'; Blair 50'	Attendance: 1,537; Referee: M Delaney

3 March 1979 Scottish Division 1	Arbroath	1–1	Dumbarton	Gayfield Park
	Yule 64'		Blair 74'	Attendance: 663; Referee: W Knowles

13 March 1979 Scottish Division 1	Dumbarton	0–3	Kilmarnock	Boghead Park
			Cairney 23'; Bourke 29'; Maxwell 49' (pen.)	Attendance: 2,000; Referee: A McFaull

17 March 1979 Scottish Division 1	Dumbarton	3–0	Clyde	Boghead Park
	McNeil 21'; MacLeod, A 34'; Blair 83'			Attendance: 1,000; Referee: T Kellock

20 March 1979 Scottish Division 1	St Johnstone	2–2	Dumbarton	Muirton Park
	Ward; Lawson		Whiteford, J (pen.); Sinclair	Attendance: 1,360; Referee: K Hope

24 March 1979 Scottish Division 1	Dundee	2–0	Dumbarton	Dens Park
	Shirra 37'; Pirie 82' (pen.)			Attendance: 5,547; Referee: R Cuthill

28 March 1979 Scottish Division 1	Dumbarton	3–0	Raith Rovers	Boghead Park
	Whiteford, J 2', 56', 81'			Attendance: 500; Referee: E Pringle

31 March 1979 Scottish Division 1	Dumbarton	0–1	Arbroath	Boghead Park
			Mylles 27'	Attendance: 450; Referee: D Syme

4 April 1979 Scottish Division 1	Dumbarton	0–0	Clyde	Boghead Park
				Attendance: 700

7 April 1979 Scottish Division 1	Dumbarton	3–2	Dundee	Boghead Park
	Gallacher, B 6', 61'; Brown 44'		Pirie 1'; Redford 77'	Attendance: 1,500; Referee: D Downie

4 April 1979 Scottish Division 1	Montrose	2–1	Dumbarton	Links Park
	Robb 55', 72'		Gallacher, B 2'	Attendance: 800; Referee: A Waddell

16 April 1979 Scottish Division 1	Dumbarton	3–0	Hamilton	Boghead Park
	Fyfe 15', 88'; Brown 15'			Attendance: 1,700

18 April 1979 Scottish Division 1	Ayr United	1–0	Dumbarton	Somerset Park
	McLaughlin 9' (pen.)			Attendance: 2,000; Referee: D Syme

21 April 1979 Scottish Division 1	Queen of the South	1–3	Dumbarton	Palmerston Park
	Coughlin 65'		Whiteford, D 26'; Fyfe 27'; Gallacher, B 48'	Attendance: 400; Referee: M Delaney

25 April 1979 Scottish Division 1	Clydebank	3–1	Dumbarton	Kilbowie Park
	McDougall 9'; McCormick 26' (pen.), 36'		Sinclair 5'	Attendance: 2,000; Referee: I Foote

28 April 1979 Scottish Division 1	Dumbarton	1–3	Kilmarnock	Boghead Park
	Findlay 80'		Cairney 14'; Gibson 51'; Bourke 78'	Attendance: 3,000; Referee: A Ferguson

2 May 1979 Scottish Division 1	Dumbarton	0–1	Airdrie	Boghead Park
			McKeown 70'	Attendance: 500

5 May 1979 Scottish Division 1	Dumbarton	4–1	Queen of the South	Boghead Park
	Gallacher, B 21', 83'; Brown 26'; Coyle, J 70'		Coughlin 49'	Attendance: 300; Referee: A Harris

7 May 1979 Scottish Division 1	Dumbarton	0–2	Stirling Albion	Boghead Park
			McPhie; Armstrong	Attendance: 400

9 May 1979 Scottish Division 1	Montrose	0–2	Dumbarton	Links Park
			Gallacher, B 19'; Whiteford, D 83'	Attendance: 400; Referee: E Pringle

=== Scottish Cup ===
19 February 1979 Scottish Cup round 3	Dumbarton	1–0	Alloa Athletic	Boghead Park
	Gallacher, B 89'			Attendance: 1,000; Referee: D Murdoch

24 February 1979 Scottish Cup round 3	Dumbarton	3–1	Clydebank	Boghead Park
	Sharp 2', 78'; Blair 81'		McDougall 32'	Attendance: 3,000; Referee: J Renton

10 March 1979 Scottish Cup round 3	Dumbarton	0–1	Partick Thistle	Boghead Park
			Anderson 83'	Attendance: 6,300; Referee: G Smith

=== Scottish League Cup ===
16 August 1978 Scottish League Cup round 1(1)	Dumbarton	0–0	St Mirren	Boghead Park
				Attendance: 4,000; Referee: K Hope

16 August 1978 Scottish League Cup round 1(2)	St Mirren	2–0 (2–0 agg.)	Dumbarton	Love Street (stadium)
	Bone 8', 43'			Attendance: 5,000; Referee: K Hope

=== Stirlingshire Cup ===
11 February 1979 Semi Final	Falkirk	0–1	Dumbarton	Brockville Park
			Coyle, T 25'

11 May 1979 Final	Clydebank	1–0	Dumbarton	Kilbowie Park
	McCormack 74'

=== Pre-season/Other Matches ===
29 July 1978 Friendly	Clachnacuddin	0–3	Dumbarton	Grant Street Park
			Gallacher, B 48'; Fyfe 64'; Govan 84'	Attendance: 500

31 July 1978 Friendly	Nairn County	1–3	Dumbarton	Nairn
	McIntosh 86'		Blair 22', 40'; Gallacher, B 27'

1 August 1978 Friendly	Ross County	2–7	Dumbarton	Victoria Park, Dingwall
	Creaney; Macdonald		Whiteford, D Brown; MacLeod, M Fyfe; Gallacher, B

23 October 1978 Testimonial	Dumbarton	1–1 (3–5 p)	Scottish League XI	Boghead Park
	Williams (pen.)		Glavin (pen.)	Attendance: 4,000

19 January 1979 Friendly	Airdrie	2–2	Dumbarton	Inverclyde
	Goal		Fyfe; Gallacher, B	Attendance: CD

23 January 1979 Friendly	Dumbarton	1–0	Clyde	Boghead Park
	Sharp

== League table ==
Pos	Team	Pld	W	D	L	GF	GA	GD	Pts
5	Hamilton Academical	39	17	9	13	63	61	+2	43
6	Airdrieonians	39	16	8	15	72	61	+11	40
7	Dumbarton	39	14	11	14	58	50	+8	39
8	Stirling Albion	39	13	9	17	43	55	−12	35
9	Clyde	39	13	8	18	54	65	−11	34

Source: RSSSF and statto
Rules for classification: 1) points; 2) goal difference; 3) number of goals scored.

== Player statistics ==
=== Squad ===
No.	Pos	Nat	Player	Total		First Division		Scottish Cup		League Cup	
No.	Pos	Nat	Player	Apps	Goals	Apps	Goals	Apps	Goals	Apps	Goals
	GK	(Scotland) SCO	Donald Hunter	18	0	15	0	3	0	0	0
	GK	(Scotland) SCO	Laurie Williams	26	0	24	0	0	0	2	0
	DF	(Scotland) SCO	Rob Campbell	12	0	11+1	0	0	0	0	0
	DF	(Scotland) SCO	Willie Russell	1	0	0+1	0	0	0	0	0
	MF	(Scotland) SCO	Iain Anderson	1	0	1	0	0	0	0	0
	MF	(Scotland) SCO	Tommy Coyle	13	0	7+6	0	0	0	0	0
	MF	(Scotland) SCO	Pat McCluskey	43	3	38	3	3	0	2	0
	MF	(Scotland) SCO	John Gallacher	44	0	39	0	3	0	2	0
	MF	(Scotland) SCO	Hugh McLean	18	2	15+2	2	0	0	0+1	0
	MF	(Scotland) SCO	Ally MacLeod	33	1	28+4	1	0	0	1	0
	MF	(Scotland) SCO	Donald McNeil	27	3	22	3	3	0	2	0
	MF	(Scotland) SCO	Jim Muir	11	2	9+2	2	0	0	0	0
	MF	(Scotland) SCO	Joe Rowan	3	0	0+3	0	0	0	0	0
	MF	(Scotland) SCO	Graeme Sinclair	32	2	27+1	2	3	0	1	0
	MF	(Scotland) SCO	Derek Whiteford	32	7	21+7	7	3	0	1	0
	FW	(Scotland) SCO	Raymond Blair	31	10	26	9	3	1	2	0
	FW	(Scotland) SCO	Ally Brown	35	4	25+5	4	3	0	2	0
	FW	(Scotland) SCO	Joe Coyle	33	2	25+4	2	2+1	0	1	0
	FW	(Scotland) SCO	Gerry Findlay	11	1	8+3	1	0	0	0	0
	FW	(Scotland) SCO	Graham Fyfe	36	7	26+7	7	1	0	2	0
	FW	(Scotland) SCO	Brian Gallacher	37	9	32	8	3	1	2	0
	FW	(Scotland) SCO	Dave Govan	2	0	0+2	0	0	0	0	0
	FW	(Scotland) SCO	Murdo MacLeod	17	1	14	1	1	0	2	0
	FW	(Scotland) SCO	Graeme Sharp	8	3	4+2	1	2	2	0	0
	FW	(Scotland) SCO	Jocky Whiteford	16	4	13+3	4	0	0	0	0

=== International Caps ===
Murdo MacLeod was selected to play for the Scottish Under 21 team in a friendly match against USA on 17 September 1978 played at Pittodrie Park (won by Scotland 3-1 and in which he scored one of the goals) and in a qualifying match for the European Under 21 Championships against Norway on 24 October 1978 played at Easter Road Stadium (won by Scotland 5–1).

=== Transfers ===
==== Players in ====
Player	From	Date
(Scotland) John Gallacher	(Scotland) Hearts	19 Jun 1978
(Scotland) Donald Hunter	(Scotland) St Mirren	26 Jun 1978
(Scotland) Graeme Sharp	(Scotland) Eastercraigs	26 Jun 1978
(Scotland) Iain Anderson	(Scotland) Fairhill	28 Aug 1978
(Scotland) Tommy Coyle	(Scotland) Shettleston	28 Aug 1978
(Scotland) Rob Campbell	(Scotland) Ferguslie United	6 Nov 1978
(Scotland) Gerry Findlay	(Scotland) Port Glasgow	27 Nov 1978
(Scotland) Joe Rowan	(England) Leicester City	22 Mar 1979
(Scotland) Dave JAckson	(Scotland) Dumbarton Academy	23 Mar 1979
(Scotland) Mike Rankin	(Scotland) Port Glasgow YC	7 Apr 1979

==== Players out ====
Player	To	Date
(Scotland) Drew Harvey	(Scotland) Stranraer	25 May 1978
(Scotland) Martin Mowatt	(Scotland) Broxburn Athletic	8 Jul 1978
(Scotland) Columb McKinley	(Scotland) Vale of Leven	5 Aug 1978
(Scotland) Bobby McCallum	(Scotland) Lanark United	21 Oct 1978
(Scotland) Murdo MacLeod	(Scotland) Celtic	2 Nov 1978
(Scotland) Jim Muir	(Australia) Adelaide City	2 Feb 1979

== Reserve team ==
Dumbarton competed in the Scottish Reserve League First Division (West).

In the Scottish Second XI Cup, Dumbarton lost to Morton in the first round, and in the Reserve League Cup, Dumbarton lost to Partick Thistle, on aggregate, in the first round.

== Trivia ==
- The League match against Clyde on 13 September marked Murdo MacLeod's 100th appearance for Dumbarton in all national competitions - the 76th Dumbarton player to reach this milestone.
- The League match against Montrose on 30 September marked Donald McNeil's 100th appearance for Dumbarton in all national competitions - the 77th Dumbarton player to reach this milestone.
- The League match against Raith Rovers on 9 December marked Graeme Sinclair's 100th appearance for Dumbarton in all national competitions - the 78th Dumbarton player to reach this milestone.
- The fee of £100,000 received for Murdo MacLeod's transfer to Celtic at the end of October broke the record set by Ian Wallace's departure two seasons earlier.

== See also ==
- 1978–79 in Scottish football
