= 1977–78 Dumbarton F.C. season =

Dumbarton
1977–1978 season
- Manager: Davie Wilson
- Stadium: Boghead Park, Dumbarton
- Scottish League Division 1: 4th
- Scottish Cup: Fifth round
- Scottish League Cup: First Round
- Top goalscorer: League: Derek Whiteford / Jocky Whiteford (15); All: Jocky Whiteford (17)

Season 1977–78 was the 94th football season in which Dumbarton competed at a Scottish national level, entering the Scottish Football League for the 72nd time, the Scottish Cup for the 83rd time, and the Scottish League Cup for the 31st time.

== Overview ==
Dumbarton played league football in Division 1 for the third year running. Davie Wilson's first season as manager began well, and while always up with the leading pack, it was to be the case that too many draws rather than wins would prevent a serious challenge on the title. Nevertheless, a 4th-place finish was a creditable result.

In the Scottish Cup, Hearts were once again the opponents, but it was Dumbarton who were to progress this time after a drawn game. In the quarter-final, however Partick Thistle were to prove too good on the day.

In the League Cup, qualifying groups were dispensed with and replaced with straight knock-out ties on a home-and-away basis. It was however to prove a bit of an embarrassment when in the first round, a 4–1 home win against Hamilton was followed by a 6–0 away drubbing.

Locally, in the Stirlingshire Cup, Dumbarton were defeated by local rivals Clydebank in the semi-final.

== Results & fixtures ==
Win Draw Loss

=== Scottish First Division ===
13 August 1977 Scottish Division 1	Dumbarton	2–2	Hearts	Boghead Park
	Bourke 16', 72'		Smith 43'; Gibson 85'	Attendance: 7,000; Referee: A McGunnigle

20 August 1977 Scottish Division 1	Arbroath	2–2	Dumbarton	Gayfield Park
	Yule 8'; Carson 70'		Bourke 62'; Muir 86'	Attendance: 1,200; Referee: B Mullan

27 August 1977 Scottish Division 1	Dumbarton	2–0	Queen of the South	Boghead Park
	Whiteford, J 9'; Brown 17'			Attendance: 2,000; Referee: B Robertson

10 September 1977 Scottish Division 1	Morton	0–0	Dumbarton	Cappielow Park
				Attendance: 3,000; Referee: J Paterson

14 September 1977 Scottish Division 1	Dumbarton	2–1	Airdrie	Boghead Park
	McNeil 54'; Whiteford, J 83' (pen.)		McCann 86'	Attendance: 3,000; Referee: A Ferguson

17 September 1977 Scottish Division 1	Dundee	2–1	Dumbarton	Dens Park
	Sinclair 47', 65'		Whitedord, D 74'	Attendance: 4,725; Referee: W Reid

24 September 1977 Scottish Division 1	Dumbarton	4–0	Montrose	Boghead Park
	Whiteford, D 47', 78'; Whiteford, J 48' (pen.); Fyfe 61'			Attendance: 2,000; Referee: M Delaney

28 September 1977 Scottish Division 1	East Fife	3–1	Dumbarton	Bayview Park, Methil
	McCluskey 25' (o.g.); Young; Hegarty 82'		Whitedord, D 52'	Attendance: 879; Referee: E Pringle

1 October 1977 Scottish Division 1	Dumbarton	5–1	St Johnstone	Boghead Park
	Whiteford, J 3'; Brown 7'; Fyfe 15', 47'; Whiteford, D 49'		O'Connor 50'	Attendance: 1,500; Referee: J Renton

8 October 1977 Scottish Division 1	Kilmarnock	2–2	Dumbarton	Rugby Park
	McCulloch 5'; Stein 50'		Whitedord, J 57'; Whitedord, D 77'	Attendance: 3,000; Referee: C White

15 October 1977 Scottish Division 1	Dumbarton	1–0	Hamilton	Boghead Park
	Whiteford, D 76'			Attendance: 2,500; Referee: K Stewart

19 October 1977 Scottish Division 1	Stirling Albion	2–3	Dumbarton	Annfield Stadium
	McPhee 12', 62'		Whitedord, J 39', 70'; Brown 75'	Attendance: 1,000; Referee: R Cuthill

2 October 1977 Scottish Division 1	Hearts	2–1	Dumbarton	Tynecastle Stadium
	Gibson 28'; Tierney 61'		Gallacher 65'	Attendance: 9,200; Referee: A McFaul

29 October 1977 Scottish Division 1	Dumbarton	1–0	Arbroath	Boghead Park
	Gallacher 89'			Attendance: 1,500; Referee: T Muirhead

5 November 1977 Scottish Division 1	Queen of the South	1–0	Dumbarton	Palmerston Park
	Hood 48'			Attendance: 1,500; Referee: W Mullen

12 November 1977 Scottish Division 1	Dumbarton	1–1	Morton	Boghead Park
	Gallacher 81'		Ritchie 8'	Attendance: 5,000; Referee: H Alexander

19 November 1977 Scottish Division 1	Dumbarton	0–0	Dundee	Boghead Park
				Attendance: 3,500; Referee: A McMunnigle

26 November 1977 Scottish Division 1	Montrose	2–2	Dumbarton	Links Park
	Markland 38'; Robb 48'		Whiteford, J 30'; Muir 84'	Attendance: 950; Referee: M Delaney

3 December 1977 Scottish Division 1	St Johnstone	0–2	Dumbarton	Muirton Park
			Whiteford, J 54'; Whiteford, D 77'	Attendance: 1,600; Referee: J Renton

10 December 1977 Scottish Division 1	Dumbarton	2–2	Kilmarnock	Boghead Park
	Fyfe 35'; Whiteford, J 78' (pen.)		McDowell 40'; Maxwell 70'	Attendance: 2,500; Referee: G Smith

17 December 1977 Scottish Division 1	Hamilton	3–3	Dumbarton	Douglas Park
	McGrogan 40', 44'; McDowell 55'		Whiteford, J 24', 63'; Whiteford, D 64'	Attendance: 2,500; Referee: D Ramsay

24 December 1977 Scottish Division 1	Alloa Athletic	2–3	Dumbarton	Recreation Park, Alloa
	Wilson 3'; Miller 13' (pen.)		Gallacher 8'; Whiteford, J 27'; Whiteford, D 77'	Attendance: 2,000; Referee: A McGunnigle

31 December 1977 Scottish Division 1	Dumbarton	1–1	Queen of the South	Boghead Park
	Muir		Goal	Attendance: 3,000; Referee: C White

2 January 1978 Scottish Division 1	Dumbarton	1–4	Morton	Boghead Park
	Whiteford, J 89'		Goldthorpe 21'; Ritchie 64', 82'; Brown 80'	Attendance: 5,000; Referee: K Hope

7 January 1978 Scottish Division 1	Arbroath	1–1	Dumbarton	Gayfield Park
	Cargill 86'		Whiteford, J 30' (pen.)	Attendance: 1,100; Referee: A Ferguson

4 February 1978 Scottish Division 1	Dumbarton	2–1	St Johnstone	Boghead Park
	Whiteford, D 6'; Whiteford, J 25' (pen.)		Pelosi 62'	Attendance: 1,500; Referee: H Alexander

11 February 1978 Scottish Division 1	Kilmarnock	0–1	Dumbarton	Rugby Park
			Whiteford, D 23'	Attendance: 5,000; Referee: T Kellock

25 February 1978 Scottish Division 1	Dumbarton	1–1	Hamilton	Boghead Park
	Whiteford, D 81'		McGrogan 63'	Attendance: 2,000; Referee: A McFall

4 March 1978 Scottish Division 1	Hearts	1–1	Dumbarton	Tynecastle Stadium
	Fraser 74'		Gallacher 61'	Attendance: 8,000; Referee: K Hope

18 March 1978 Scottish Division 1	Stirling Albion	2–2	Dumbarton	Annfield Stadium
	Muir 41', 42' (o.g.)		Brown 3', 62'	Attendance: 1,200; Referee: J Renton

21 March 1978 Scottish Division 1	Dumbarton	3–0	East Fife	Boghead Park
	McNeil 6'; Gallacher 20', 60'			Attendance: 3,000; Referee: T Kellock

25 March 1978 Scottish Division 1	Dumbarton	2–2	Stirling Albion	Boghead Park
	Muir 81'; Steedman 83' (o.g.)		Browning 1', 87'	Attendance: 2,000; Referee: J Gordon

4 April 1978 Scottish Division 1	Airdrie	0–2	Dumbarton	Broomfield Park
			Muir 35'; Gallacher 82'	Attendance: 2,000; Referee: R Cuthill

8 April 1978 Scottish Division 1	Alloa Athletic	3–0	Dumbarton	Recreation Park, Alloa
	Irvine 52' (pen.); Morrison 63'; Wallace 89'			Attendance: 1,000; Referee: K Stewart

12 April 1978 Scottish Division 1	Dumbarton	2–1	Dundee	Boghead Park
	MacLeod, M 35'; Gallacher 75'		Redford 34'	Attendance: 2,000; Referee: D Ramsay

15 April 1978 Scottish Division 1	East Fife	0–0	Dumbarton	Bayview Park, Methil
				Attendance: 651; Referee: A McGunnigle

19 April 1978 Scottish Division 1	Dumbarton	2–2	Montrose	Boghead Park
	Brown 70'; McCluskey 77'		Walker 72'; Brown 83'	Attendance: 1,500; Referee: K Stewart

22 April 1978 Scottish Division 1	Dumbarton	2–1	Airdrie	Boghead Park
	Whiteford, D 42'; Govan 47'		McGuire 43'	Attendance: 1,000; Referee: D Syme

29 April 1978 Scottish Division 1	Dumbarton	2–0	Alloa Athletic	Boghead Park
	Whiteford, D 37'; Blair 89'			Attendance: 1,000; Referee: M Delaney

=== Scottish Cup ===
29 January 1978 Scottish Cup round 3	Alloa Athletic	2–2	Dumbarton	Recreation Park, Alloa
	Carberry 30'; Morrison 40'		Whitedord, J 39'; MacLeod, M 43'	Attendance: 1,450; Referee: K Hope

6 February 1978 Scottish Cup round 3R	Dumbarton	2–1	Alloa Athletic	Boghead Park
	MacLeod, M 55'; Fyfe 77'		McCann 86'	Attendance: 1,750; Referee: K Hope

18 February 1978 Scottish Cup round 4	Dumbarton	1–1	Hearts	Boghead Park
	Whiteford, D 14'		Bannon 60'	Attendance: 6,677; Referee: B McGinlay

27 February 1978 Scottish Cup round 4R	Hearts	0–1	Dumbarton	Tynecastle Stadium
			Gallacher 38'	Attendance: 14,000; Referee: B McGinlay

11 March 1978 Scottish Cup round 5	Partick Thistle	2–1	Dumbarton	Firhill Stadium
	Somner 43', 79'		Fyfe 62' (pen.)	Attendance: 4,500; Referee: I Foote

=== Scottish League Cup ===
31 August 1977 Scottish League Cup round 1(1)	Dumbarton	4–1	Hamilton	Boghead Park
	McCluskey 68'; Muir 85'; Whiteford, J 86'; Bourke 89'		Frew 62'	Attendance: 1,000; Referee: T Kyle

3 September 1977 Scottish League Cup round 1(2)	Hamilton	6–0 (7–4 agg.)	Dumbarton	Douglas Park
	Fairley 14'; McCluskey 20' (o.g.); Graham 49'; McGrogan 64'; McManus 76', 84'			Attendance: 1,000; Referee: T Kyle

=== Stirlingshire Cup ===
5 October 1977 1st round	Dumbarton	4–1	East Stirling	Boghead Park
	Whiteford, J 19'; Fyfe 29'; Muir 59'; Renwick 72' (o.g.)		Campbell 13'	Attendance: 800

20 April 1978 Semi-final	Clydebank	4–1	Dumbarton	Kilbowie Park
	Goal		Whiteford, D

=== Pre-season/Other Matches ===
5 August 1977 Friendly	Lossiemouth	1–1	Dumbarton	Grant Park, Lossiemouth
	Goal		Goal

6 August 1977 Friendly	Nairn County	0–3	Dumbarton	Nairn
			Gallacher 14'; MacLeod, A 70', 72'

6 September 1977 Friendly	St Mirren	1–1	Dumbarton	Love Street (stadium)
	Goal		Blair

== League table ==
Pos	Team	Pld	W	D	L	GF	GA	GD	Pts	Promotion or relegation
2	Heart of Midlothian (P)	39	24	10	5	77	42	+35	58	Promotion to the Premier Division
3	Dundee	39	25	7	7	91	44	+47	57	
4	Dumbarton	39	16	17	6	65	48	+17	49	
5	Stirling Albion	39	15	12	12	60	52	+8	42	
6	Kilmarnock	39	14	12	13	52	46	+6	40	

Source: RSSSF and statto
Rules for classification: 1) points; 2) goal difference; 3) number of goals scored.
(P) Promoted

== Player statistics ==
=== Squad ===
No.	Pos	Nat	Player	Total		First Division		Scottish Cup		League Cup	
No.	Pos	Nat	Player	Apps	Goals	Apps	Goals	Apps	Goals	Apps	Goals
	GK	(Scotland) SCO	Jim Cruickshank	6	0	3	0	1	0	2	0
	GK	(Scotland) SCO	Laurie Williams	40	0	36	0	4	0	0	0
	DF	(Scotland) SCO	Don Watt	15	0	9+3	0	1	0	2	0
	MF	(Scotland) SCO	Pat McCluskey	34	2	28	1	4	0	2	1
	MF	(Scotland) SCO	Columb McKinley	13	0	12+1	0	0	0	0	0
	MF	(Scotland) SCO	Ally MacLeod	20	0	11+7	0	1+1	0	0	0
	MF	(Scotland) SCO	Donald McNeil	38	2	30+1	2	5	0	2	0
	MF	(Scotland) SCO	Martin Mowat	5	0	5	0	0	0	0	0
	MF	(Scotland) SCO	Jim Muir	37	6	29+1	5	5	0	2	1
	MF	(Scotland) SCO	Graeme Sinclair	40	0	36	0	4	0	0	0
	MF	(Scotland) SCO	Derek Whiteford	46	16	39	15	5	1	2	0
	FW	(Scotland) SCO	Raymond Blair	23	2	8+11	2	2+2	0	0	0
	FW	(Scotland) SCO	John Bourke	5	4	3	3	0	0	2	1
	FW	(Scotland) SCO	Ally Brown	46	6	38+1	6	5	0	2	0
	FW	(Scotland) SCO	Joe Coyle	4	0	2+1	0	0	0	0+1	0
	FW	(Scotland) SCO	Graham Fyfe	34	7	29	5	5	2	0	0
	FW	(Scotland) SCO	Brian Gallacher	42	10	34+1	9	5	1	2	0
	FW	(Scotland) SCO	Dave Govan	2	1	1+1	1	0	0	0	0
	FW	(Scotland) SCO	Drew Harvey	4	0	0+4	0	0	0	0	0
	FW	(Scotland) SCO	Murdo MacLeod	46	3	39	1	5	2	2	0
	FW	(Scotland) SCO	Jocky Whiteford	32	17	27	15	3	1	2	1

=== International Caps ===
Murdo MacLeod and Graeme Sinclair were selected to play for the Scottish League in a match against an Italian League XI in Verona, which resulted in a 1–1 draw.

In addition Ally MacLeod was part of the Scottish Youth (under 19) side which competed in the UEFA Youth Championships. He played in all seven matches, against Denmark (1-0 and 2–0), West Germany (1–0), Portugal (1–0), Italy (0-0), Yugoslavia (2-2) and Poland (1–3) - Scotland finished in 4th place.

=== Transfers ===
==== Players in ====
Player	From	Date
(Scotland) Derek Whiteford	(Scotland) Airdrie	28 May 1977
(Scotland) Jim Cruickshank	(Scotland) Hearts	25 Jul 1977
(Scotland) Brian Gallacher	(Scotland) Radnor Park Juv	8 Aug 1977
(Scotland) David Govan	(Scotland) Paisley YMCA	8 Aug 1977
(Scotland) Pat McCluskey	(Scotland) Celtic	12 Aug 1977
(Scotland) Graham Fyfe	(Scotland) Hibernian	14 Sep 1977

==== Players out ====
Player	To	Date
(Scotland) Brian Brown	(Scotland) Falkirk	13 Jun 1977
(Scotland) Jim Donaldson	(Scotland) Blantyre Vics	6 Jul 1977
(Scotland) Johnny Graham	(Scotland) Rutherglen Glencairn	28 Jul 1977
(Scotland) Ian McGregor	(Scotland) Stenhousemuir	23 Aug 1977
(Scotland) Billy Steele	(Scotland) Cowdenbeath	27 Aug 1977
(Scotland) John Bourke	(Scotland) Dundee United	15 Sep 1977
(Scotland) Tommy Mulraine	(Scotland) Amateur football	
(Scotland) Jim Cruickshank	(Scotland) Retired	

== Reserve team ==
Dumbarton competed in the Scottish Reserve League First Division and finished 8th of 11.

In the Scottish Second XI Cup, Dumbarton lost to Ayr United in the first round, and in the Reserve League Cup, Dumbarton lost to Rangers, on aggregate, in the first round.

== Trivia ==
- The League match against Arbroath on 20 August marked Jim Muir's 100th appearance for Dumbarton in all national competitions - the 74th Dumbarton player to reach this milestone.
- The League match against Airdrie on 14 September marked Ally Brown's 100th appearance for Dumbarton in all national competitions - the 75th Dumbarton player to reach this milestone.
- The League match against Hamilton on 25 February marked Laurie Williams's 300th appearance for Dumbarton in all national competitions - the 5th Dumbarton player to achieve this accolade.

== See also ==
- 1977–78 in Scottish football
