= 1984–85 Celtic F.C. season =

Celtic
1984–85 season
- Chairman: Desmond White
- Manager: Davie Hay
- Stadium: Celtic Park
- Scottish Premier Division: 2nd
- Scottish Cup: Winners
- Scottish League Cup: Quarter-finalists
- European Cup Winners' Cup: 2nd round
- Highest home attendance: 48,824
- Lowest home attendance: 6,514
- Average home league attendance: 20,830

During the 1984–85 Scottish football season, Celtic competed in the Scottish Premier Division. After a trophyless first season under new Manager David Hay, Celtic went into the Manager's second season under a certain amount of pressure to get back amongst the main prizes in Scottish Football. During the pre-season pacey forward Alan McInally was brought in from Ayr United and the club continued to be linked with a striker until the finally swooped for Watford F.C. young Scottish striker Mo Johnston in October. In November the club signed Irishman Pierce O'Leary to bolster its defence.

A pre-season tour of Ireland was followed up with two home friendlies against Arsenal, who featured ex-Celtic hero Charlie Nicholas who was rounded jeered during the match and also against Nottingham Forest who featured recently transferred Jim McInally.

== Competitions ==
=== Scottish Premier Division ===
==== League table ====
Pos	Team	Pld	W	D	L	GF	GA	GD	Pts	Qualification or relegation
1	Aberdeen (C)	36	27	5	4	89	26	+63	59	Qualification for the European Cup first round
2	Celtic	36	22	8	6	77	30	+47	52	Qualification for the Cup Winners' Cup first round
3	Dundee United	36	20	7	9	67	33	+34	47	Qualification for the UEFA Cup first round
4	Rangers	36	13	12	11	47	38	+9	38	Qualification for the UEFA Cup first round
5	St Mirren	36	17	4	15	51	56	−5	38	Qualification for the UEFA Cup first round

Source: Statto
Rules for classification: 1) points; 2) goal difference; 3) number of goals scored.
(C) Champions

==== Matches ====
11 August 1984 Premier League	Hibernian	0–0	Celtic	Edinburgh
15:00				Stadium: Easter Road; Attendance: 12,415

18 August 1984 Premier League	Celtic	1–1	Dundee United	Glasgow
15:00				Stadium: Celtic Park; Attendance: 18,905

25 August 1984 Premier League	Rangers	0–0	Celtic	Glasgow
15:00				Stadium: Ibrox Stadium; Attendance: 42,906

1 September 1984 Premier League	Celtic	5–0	Morton	Glasgow
15:00				Stadium: Celtic Park; Attendance: 12,123

8 September 1984 Premier League	Dumbarton	1–1	Celtic	Dumbarton
15:00 GMT				Stadium: Boghead Park; Attendance: 8,416

15 September 1984 Premier League	Celtic	1–0	Hearts	Glasgow
15:00 GMT				Stadium: Celtic Park; Attendance: 18,411

22 September 1984 Premier League	St Mirren	1–2	Celtic	Paisley
15:00 GMT				Stadium: St Mirren Park, Love Street; Attendance: 12,791

29 September 1984 Premier League	Dundee	2–3	Celtic	Dundee
15:00 GMT				Stadium: Dens Park; Attendance: 13,761

6 October 1984 Premier League	Celtic	2–1	Aberdeen	Glasgow
15:00 GMT				Stadium: Celtic Park; Attendance: 31,468

13 October 1984 Premier League	Celtic	3–0	Hibernian	Glasgow
15:00 GMT				Stadium: Celtic Park; Attendance: 27,863

20 October 1984 Premier League	Dundee United	1–3	Celtic	Dundee
15:00 GMT				Stadium: Tannadice Park; Attendance: 16,758

3 November 1984 Premier League	Morton	2–1	Celtic	Greenock
15:00 GMT				Stadium: Cappielow Park; Attendance: 10,053

10 November 1984 Premier League	Celtic	2–0	Dumbarton	Glasgow
15:00 GMT				Stadium: Celtic Park; Attendance: 13,791

17 November 1984 Premier League	Hearts	1–5	Celtic	Edinburgh
15:00 GMT				Stadium: Tynecastle Park; Attendance: 20,117

24 November 1984 Premier League	Celtic	7–1	St Mirren	Glasgow
15:00 GMT				Stadium: Celtic Park; Attendance: 16,418

1 December 1984 Premier League	Celtic	5–1	Dundee	Glasgow
15:00 GMT				Stadium: Celtic Park; Attendance: 15,887

8 December 1984 Premier League	Aberdeen	4–2	Celtic	Aberdeen
19:30 GMT				Stadium: Pittodrie Stadium; Attendance: 22,175

15 December 1984 Premier League	Hibernian	0–1	Celtic	Edinburgh
15:00 GMT				Stadium: Easter Road; Attendance: 8,753

22 December 1984 Premier League	Celtic	1–1	Rangers	Glasgow
15:00 GMT				Stadium: Celtic Park; Attendance: 43,716

29 December 1984 Premier League	Celtic	1–2	Dundee United	Glasgow
15:00 GMT				Stadium: Celtic Park; Attendance: 22,894

1 January 1985 Premier League	Rangers	1–2	Celtic	Glasgow
15:00 GMT				Stadium: Ibrox Stadium; Attendance: 42,735

2 February 1985 Premier League	St Mirren	0–2	Celtic	Paisley
15:00 GMT				Stadium: St Mirren Park, Love Street; Attendance: 13,894

9 February 1985 Premier League	Dundee	2–0	Celtic	Dundee
15:00 GMT				Stadium: Dens Park; Attendance: 12,087

19 February 1985 Premier League	Celtic	4–0	Morton	Glasgow
19:30 GMT				Stadium: Celtic Park; Attendance: 10,197

23 February 1985 Premier League	Celtic	2–0	Aberdeen	Glasgow
15:00 GMT				Stadium: Celtic Park; Attendance: 48,824

2 March 1985 Premier League	Dundee United	0–0	Celtic	Dundee
15:00 GMT				Stadium: Tannadice Park; Attendance: 16,493

16 March 1985 Premier League	Celtic	0–1	Hibernian	Glasgow
15:00 GMT				Stadium: Celtic Park; Attendance: 15,820

20 March 1985 Premier League	Celtic	3–2	Hearts	Glasgow
19:30 GMT				Stadium: Celtic Park; Attendance: 11,522

23 March 1985 Premier League	Morton	2–7	Celtic	Greenock
15:00 GMT				Stadium: Cappielow Park; Attendance: 7,326

3 April 1985 Premier League	Dumbarton	0–2	Celtic	Dumbarton
19:30 GMT				Stadium: Boghead Park; Attendance: 6,043

6 April 1985 Premier League	Hearts	0–2	Celtic	Edinburgh
15:00 GMT				Stadium: Tynecastle Park; Attendance: 14,883

20 April 1985 Premier League	Celtic	3–0	St Mirren	Glasgow
15:00 GMT				Stadium: Celtic Park; Attendance: 11,746

27 April 1985 Premier League	Aberdeen	1–1	Celtic	Aberdeen
15:00 GMT				Stadium: Pittodrie Stadium; Attendance: 22,653

1 May 1985 Premier League	Celtic	1–1	Rangers	Glasgow
19:30 GMT				Stadium: Celtic Park; Attendance: 40,079

4 May 1985 Premier League	Celtic	0–1	Dundee	Glasgow
15:00 GMT				Stadium: Celtic Park; Attendance: 8,815

11 May 1985 Premier League	Celtic	2–0	Dumbarton	Glasgow
15:00 GMT				Stadium: Celtic Park; Attendance: 6,514

=== Scottish Cup ===
30 January 1985 Third round	Hamilton Academical	1–2	Celtic	Glasgow
19:30 GMT				Stadium: Celtic Park; Attendance: 10,000

16 February 1985 Fourth round	Celtic	6–0	Inverness Thistle	Glasgow
15:00 GMT				Stadium: Celtic Park; Attendance: 14,937

9 March 1985 Fifth round	Dundee	1–1	Celtic	Dundee
15:00 GMT				Stadium: Dens Park; Attendance: 21,301

13 March 1985 Fifth round replay	Celtic	2–1	Dundee	Glasgow
19:30 GMT				Stadium: Celtic Park; Attendance: 37,390

13 April 1985 Semi-final	Motherwell	1–1	Celtic	Glasgow
15:00 GMT				Stadium: Hampden Park; Attendance: 29,935

17 April 1985 Semi-final replay	Celtic	3–0	Motherwell	Glasgow
19:30 GMT				Stadium: Hampden Park; Attendance: 25,876

18 May 1985 Final	Celtic	2–1	Dundee United	Glasgow
15:00 GMT				Stadium: Hampden Park; Attendance: 59,256

=== Scottish League Cup ===
22 August 1984 Second round	Dunfermline Athletic	2–3	Celtic	Dunfermline
19:30 GMT				Stadium: East End Park; Attendance: 8,656

29 August 1984 Third round	Airdrieonians	0–4	Celtic	Airdrie
19:30 GMT				Stadium: Broomfield Park; Attendance: 11,411

5 September 1984 Quarter Finals	Dundee United	2–1	Celtic	Dundee
19:30 GMT				Stadium: Tannadice Park; Attendance: 21,182

=== European Cup Winners' Cup ===
19 September 1984 1st round 1st leg	KAA Gent (Belgium)	1–0	(Scotland) Celtic	Ghent
20:00 GMT				Stadium: Jules Ottenstadion; Attendance: 22,500

3 October 1984 1st round 2nd leg	Celtic (Scotland)	3–0 (3–1 agg.)	(Belgium) KAA Gent	Glasgow
20:00 GMT				Stadium: Celtic Park; Attendance: 32,749

24 October 1984 2nd round 1st leg	Rapid Vienna (Austria)	3–1	(Scotland) Celtic	Vienna
20:00 GMT				Stadium: Gerhard Hanappi Stadium; Attendance: 15,700

7 November 1984 2nd round 2nd leg	Celtic (Scotland)	3–0 (4–3 agg.)	(Austria) Rapid Vienna	Glasgow
20:00 GMT				Stadium: Celtic Park; Attendance: 48,813

12 December 1984 2nd round 2nd leg (rearranged)	Celtic (Scotland)	0–1 (1–4 agg.)	(Austria) Rapid Vienna	Manchester
20:00 GMT				Stadium: Old Trafford; Attendance: 55,150

== Staff ==
Board of Directors
Position	Name
Chairman	Desmond White
Vice-chairman	Thomas Devlin
Secretary	Desmond White
Directors	James Farrell Kevin Kelly Jack McGinn Chris White

Football Staff
Position	Name
Manager	David Hay
Assistant Manager	Frank Connor
Coach	Bobby Lennox
Physio	Brian Scott
Masseur	Jimmy Steele
Kitman	Neil Mochan

== Transfers ==
Transfers In
Date	Name	From	Transfer Fee
May 1984	Alan McInally	Ayr United F.C.	£95,000
October 1984	Mo Johnston	Watford F.C.	£400,000
November 1984	Pierce O'Leary	Vancouver Whitecaps FC	£50,000
		Total Transfer Fees	£445,000

Transfers Out
Date	Name	To	Transfer Fee
May 1984	Jim McInally	Nottingham Forest F.C.	£40,000
May 1984	Brian Whittaker	Heart of Midlothian F.C.	£25,000
October 1984	John Halpin	Carlisle United F.C.	Free Transfer
November 1984	Jim Melrose	Manchester City F.C.	£40,000
April 1985	Mark Reid	Charlton Athletic F.C.	£40,000
		Total Transfer Fees	£105,000
