= 1979–80 Scottish Football League =

Scottish football season

Statistics of Scottish Football League in season 1979/1980.

== Scottish Premier Division ==
Pos	Team	Pld	W	D	L	GF	GA	GD	Pts	Qualification or relegation
1	Aberdeen (C)	36	19	10	7	68	36	+32	48	Qualification for the European Cup first round
2	Celtic	36	18	11	7	61	38	+23	47	Qualification for the Cup Winners' Cup first round
3	St Mirren	36	15	12	9	56	49	+7	42	Qualification for the UEFA Cup first round
4	Dundee United	36	12	13	11	43	30	+13	37	Qualification for the UEFA Cup first round
5	Rangers	36	15	7	14	50	46	+4	37	
6	Morton	36	14	8	14	51	46	+5	36	
7	Partick Thistle	36	11	14	11	43	47	−4	36	
8	Kilmarnock	36	11	11	14	36	52	−16	33	
9	Dundee (R)	36	10	6	20	47	73	−26	26	Relegation to the 1980–81 Scottish First Division
10	Hibernian (R)	36	6	6	24	29	67	−38	18	Relegation to the 1980–81 Scottish First Division

Source: Statto and RSSSF
Rules for classification: 1) points; 2) goal difference; 3) number of goals scored.
(C) Champions; (R) Relegated

== Scottish First Division ==
Pos	Team	Pld	W	D	L	GF	GA	GD	Pts	Promotion or relegation
1	Heart of Midlothian (C, P)	39	20	13	6	58	39	+19	53	Promotion to the Premier Division
2	Airdrieonians (P)	39	21	9	9	78	47	+31	51	Promotion to the Premier Division
3	Ayr United	39	16	12	11	64	51	+13	44	
4	Dumbarton	39	19	6	14	59	51	+8	44	
5	Raith Rovers	39	14	15	10	54	46	+8	43	
6	Motherwell	39	16	11	12	59	48	+11	43	
7	Hamilton Academical	39	15	10	14	60	59	+1	40	
8	Stirling Albion	39	13	13	13	40	40	0	39	
9	Clydebank	39	14	8	17	58	57	+1	36	
10	Dunfermline Athletic	39	11	13	15	39	57	−18	35	
11	St Johnstone	39	12	10	17	57	74	−17	34	
12	Berwick Rangers	39	8	15	16	57	64	−7	31	
13	Arbroath (R)	39	9	10	20	50	79	−29	28	Relegation to the Second Division
14	Clyde (R)	39	6	13	20	43	69	−26	25	Relegation to the Second Division

Source: RSSSF and statto
Rules for classification: 1) points; 2) goal difference; 3) number of goals scored.
(C) Champions; (P) Promoted; (R) Relegated

== Scottish Second Division ==
Pos	Team	Pld	W	D	L	GF	GA	GD	Pts	Promotion
1	Falkirk (C, P)	39	19	12	8	65	35	+30	50	Promotion to the First Division
2	East Stirlingshire (P)	39	21	7	11	55	40	+15	49	Promotion to the First Division
3	Forfar Athletic	39	19	8	12	63	51	+12	46	
4	Albion Rovers	39	16	12	11	73	56	+17	44	
5	Queen's Park	39	16	9	14	59	47	+12	41	
6	Stenhousemuir	39	16	9	14	56	51	+5	41	
7	Brechin City	39	15	10	14	61	59	+2	40	
8	Cowdenbeath	39	14	12	13	54	52	+2	40	
9	Montrose	39	14	10	15	60	63	−3	38	
10	East Fife	39	12	9	18	45	57	−12	33	
11	Stranraer	39	12	8	19	51	65	−14	32	
12	Meadowbank Thistle	39	12	8	19	42	70	−28	32	
13	Queen of the South	39	11	9	19	51	69	−18	31	
14	Alloa Athletic	39	11	7	21	44	64	−20	29	

Source: "1979-1980 Second Division - SPFL Archive". SPFL.
Rules for classification: 1) points; 2) goal difference; 3) number of goals scored.
(C) Champions; (P) Promoted

== See also ==
- 1979–80 in Scottish football
