= Frank Close (footballer) =

Scottish footballer

Personal information
- Full name: Frank Close
- Date of birth: 5 May 1963 (age 63)
- Height: 5 ft 11 in (1.80 m)
- Position: Defender

Youth career
- St Margarets High

Senior career*
Years	Team	Apps	(Gls)
1979–1982	Airdrie	2	
1982–1983	Dumbarton	17	(2)
- * Club domestic league appearances and goals

Frank Close (born 5 May 1963) was a Scottish footballer who played for Airdrie and Dumbarton.
