= Gordon Arthur (footballer) =

Scottish footballer

Personal information
- Date of birth: 30 May 1958 (age 68)
- Place of birth: Kirkcaldy, Scotland
- Position: Goalkeeper

Senior career*
Years	Team	Apps	(Gls)
1975–1977	Dundee	0	(0)
1977–1984	Stirling Albion	214	(0)
1983–1984	Partick Thistle	2	(0)
1984–1988	Dumbarton	144	(0)
1988–1994	Raith Rovers	174	(0)
1994–1997	Forfar Athletic	98	(0)
1997	Arbroath	9	(0)
1997–1998	Montrose	1	(0)
Total		642	(0)
- * Club domestic league appearances and goals

Gordon Arthur (born 30 May 1958) is a Scottish former footballer, who played as a goalkeeper for a number of Scottish clubs.

Beginning his senior career with Dundee in 1975, Arthur failed to make a first-team appearance and moved to Stirling Albion in 1977, featuring in nearly 200 league matches for The Binos before moving to Dumbarton in 1984. Arthur was a first-team regular in his four years at Boghead and moved to hometown club Raith Rovers in 1988. In six years at Stark's Park, Arthur played in over 150 league matches, tasting promotion to the Premier Division when the club won the Scottish First Division championship in 1992–93. A move to Forfar Athletic beckoned in 1994 following Raith's relegation and after playing in just under 100 league games for them, including winning the 1994–95 Scottish Third Division, Arthur saw out his career with spells at Arbroath and Montrose. Upon retiring, Arthur remained at Montrose as goalkeeping coach.

== Honours ==
Raith Rovers

- Scottish First Division: 1

1992–93

Forfar Athletic

- Scottish Third Division: 1

1994–95
