= Jim Simpson (footballer, born 1959) =

Scottish footballer

Personal information
- Full name: James Bowman Simpson
- Date of birth: 24 April 1959 (age 67)
- Place of birth: Motherwell, Scotland
- Position: Midfielder

Youth career
- Shettleston

Senior career*
Years	Team	Apps	(Gls)
1982–1984	Kilmarnock	43	(1)
1984–1986	Dumbarton	32	(3)
1985–1987	Morton	28	(1)
- * Club domestic league appearances and goals

James Bowman Simpson (born 24 April 1959) was a Scottish footballer who played for Kilmarnock, Dumbarton and Morton.
