= Joe O'Donnell (footballer) =

Scottish footballer

Personal information
- Full name: Joseph O'Donnell
- Date of birth: 3 March 1961 (age 65)
- Position: Full back

Youth career
- Hillwood BC

Senior career*
Years	Team	Apps	(Gls)
1979–1981	Dumbarton	3	(0)
1983–1987	Stranraer	113	(4)
- * Club domestic league appearances and goals

Joseph O'Donnell (born 3 March 1961) was a Scottish footballer who played for Dumbarton and Stranraer.
