= Tommy McGrain =

Scottish footballer

Personal information
- Full name: Thomas McGrain
- Date of birth: 31 January 1959 (age 67)
- Place of birth: Glasgow, Scotland
- Position: Midfielder

Youth career
- Celtic Boys Club
- 1974–1977: Celtic
- 1975–1976: → Maryhill (loan)
- 1976–1977: → Duntocher Hibs (loan)

Senior career*
| Years | Team | Apps | (Gls) |
| 1977–1978 | Partick Thistle | 0 | (0) |
| 1978 | Galway Rovers | | |
| 1979 | Sligo Rovers | | |
| 1979–1981 | Dumbarton | 50 | (2) |
- Pollok
- * Club domestic league appearances and goals

Thomas McGrain (born 31 January 1959) is a Scottish retired footballer who played as a midfielder. He is the younger brother of Danny McGrain, one of Celtic's most lauded players.

McGrain was initially signed up on an 'S' form by Celtic. After a couple of seasons on loan in the Junior ranks with Maryhill (where Danny had also played) and Duntocher Hibs, he was released by Celtic and signed for Partick Thistle, managed by former Hoops star Bertie Auld. He was also unable to break into the first team at the Jags and moved to the Republic of Ireland, initially to Galway Rovers where another former Celtic man Tommy Callaghan had become player-manager.

In 1979, McGrain returned to Scotland and joined Dumbarton, playing for two seasons in the Scottish First Division. In 1980, he scored league goals against Heart of Midlothian and St Johnstone. In 1981, he left the Sons and reverted to the Junior grade with Pollok.
