= Dougie McNab =

Scottish footballer (born 1956)

Personal information
- Full name: Douglas Gordon McNab
- Date of birth: 3 July 1956 (age 70)
- Place of birth: Edinburgh, Scotland
- Position: Goalkeeper

Youth career
- Penicuik Athletic

Senior career*
Years	Team	Apps	(Gls)
1977–1980	Alloa Athletic	75	(0)
1979–1984	Partick Thistle	46	(0)
1983–1984	Hamilton Academical	12	(0)
1984–1985	→ Dumbarton (loan)	1	(0)
1984–1985	Meadowbank Thistle	8	(0)
- * Club domestic league appearances and goals

Douglas Gordon McNab (born 3 July 1956) is a Scottish former footballer, who played for Alloa Athletic, Partick Thistle, Hamilton Academical, Dumbarton and Meadowbank Thistle.
