= Donald Hunter (footballer, born 1955) =

Scottish footballer

Personal information
- Full name: Donald Hunter
- Date of birth: 1 April 1955 (age 71)
- Place of birth: Dumbarton, Scotland
- Position: Goalkeeper

Senior career*
Years	Team	Apps	(Gls)
1973–1975	Rangers	3	(0)
1975–1978	St Mirren	58	(0)
1978–1981	Dumbarton	27	(0)
1981–1985	Alloa Athletic	124	(0)
- * Club domestic league appearances and goals

Donald Hunter (born 1 April 1955) is a Scottish former professional football player who is best known for his time with Alloa Athletic.

Hunter joined Rangers in 1973 from Vale of Leven in the junior leagues. He was never to trouble Peter McCloy or Stewart Kennedy for the number one jersey at the club and soon moved on. In 1975, he was signed by Alex Ferguson for St Mirren, making over sixty league and cup appearances and winning the second division championship before moving on to Dumbarton. He then joined Alloa Athletic where he was to make the bulk of his league appearances, 124 in total, but retired from professional football to start a new career with Strathclyde Police.
