= Gerry Crawley =

Scottish footballer

Personal information
- Full name: Gerard Martin Crawley
- Date of birth: 3 July 1962 (age 64)
- Place of birth: Glasgow, Scotland
- Position: Forward

Youth career
- St Roch's

Senior career*
Years	Team	Apps	(Gls)
1980–1983	Queen's Park	93	(17)
1983–1986	Dumbarton	66	(2)
1985–1987	Brechin City	5	(1)
1986–1987	St Johnstone	3	(1)
- * Club domestic league appearances and goals

Gerard Martin Crawley (born 3 July 1962) was a Scottish footballer who played for Queen's Park, Dumbarton, Brechin City and St Johnstone.
