= Kenny Ashwood =

Scottish footballer

Personal information
- Full name: William Kenneth Ashwood
- Date of birth: 16 January 1958 (age 68)
- Place of birth: Baillieston, Scotland
- Position: Outside left

Youth career
- Airdrie

Senior career*
| Years | Team | Apps | (Gls) |
| 1976–1983 | East Stirlingshire | 166 | (28) |
| 1982–1984 | Falkirk | 9 | (0) |
| 1983–1986 | Dumbarton | 58 | (15) |
| 1985–1987 | Ayr United | 17 | (4) |
| 1985–1987 | Airdrie | 8 | (2) |
| 1986–1987 | Falkirk | 17 | (2) |
| 1987–1988 | Queen of the South | 3 | (0) |
- * Club domestic league appearances and goals

William Kenneth Ashwood (born 16 January 1958) was a Scottish footballer who played for East Stirlingshire, Falkirk, Dumbarton, Ayr United, Airdrie and Queen of the South.
