= Columb McKinley =

Scottish footballer (1950–2021)

Personal information
- Date of birth: 24 August 1950
- Date of death: 6 February 2021 (aged 70)
- Position: Half back

Youth career
- Vale of Leven

Senior career*
Years	Team	Apps	(Gls)
1969–1975	Airdrie	64	(4)
1975–1978	Dumbarton	62	(0)
1978–1979	Vale of Leven		
1979–1981	HK Rangers		
1981–1982	Seiko SA		
1982–1986	HK Rangers		
Total		126	(4)
- * Club domestic league appearances and goals

Columb McKinley (24 August 1950 – 6 February 2021) was a Scottish footballer who played as a half back for Airdrie and Dumbarton.

McKinley began his career with Vale of Leven juniors before moving to Airdrieonians in 1969, after six years with the Broomfield club he then moved to Dumbarton in 1975 where he played a key part in the club's run to the 1976 Scottish Cup semi final against Heart of Midlothian, he quit the senior game in 1978 to return to Vale Of Leven Juniors.

McKinley died on 6 February 2021, aged 70.
