= Martin Walsh (footballer) =

Scottish footballer

Personal information
- Date of birth: 16 January 1966 (age 60)
- Place of birth: Dumbarton, Scotland
- Position: Centre forward

Youth career
- Duntocher Boys Club

Senior career*
Years	Team	Apps	(Gls)
1983–1985	Dumbarton	2	(1)
1987–1989	Stirling Albion	14	(1)
- * Club domestic league appearances and goals

Martin Walsh (born 16 January 1966) was a Scottish footballer who played for the teams Dumbarton and Stirling Albion.
