= David Stevenson (footballer, born 1958) =

Scottish footballer

Personal information
- Full name: David Stevenson
- Date of birth: 26 October 1958 (age 68)
- Position: Centre half

Youth career
- Carluke Rovers

Senior career*
Years	Team	Apps	(Gls)
1976–1977	Partick Thistle		
1982–1984	Dumbarton	41	(9)
1983–1984	Falkirk	15	(0)
- * Club domestic league appearances and goals

David Stevenson (born 26 October 1958) is a Scottish former footballer who played for Partick Thistle, Dumbarton, East Fife and Falkirk.
