= Joe Carson (footballer) =

Scottish footballer

Personal information
- Date of birth: 24 November 1953 (age 72)
- Place of birth: Helensburgh, Scotland
- Height: 1.91 m (6 ft 3 in)
- Position: Defender

Senior career*
Years	Team	Apps	(Gls)
1973–1980	Arbroath	179	(10)
1978–1984	Motherwell	126	(8)
1983–1984	Dumbarton	5	(0)
1984–1987	Partick Thistle	103	(9)
1987–1988	Stranraer	20	(0)
1987–1988	Dumbarton	3	(0)
- Vale of Leven
- Pollock
- * Club domestic league appearances and goals

Joe Carson (born 24 November 1953) is a Scottish former professional footballer who spent his entire playing career in the Scottish leagues, playing mostly as a central defender.

== Early life ==
Born in Helensburgh, Argyll & Bute, Carson was brought up in the town of Alexandria, West Dunbartonshire. His younger brother, Tom Carson, was also a footballer and Dumbarton manager.

== Career ==
Carson was awarded Motherwell's Player of the Year award for the 1986–1987 season. Carson is also the only player sent off two matches in a row against the same team, first in a league match on a Saturday then again in a cup game on a Wednesday night.
