= Billy Lamont =

Scottish footballer and manager (1936–2021)

Personal information
- Date of birth: 12 May 1936
- Place of birth: Larkhall, Scotland
- Date of death: October 2021 (aged 85)
- Position: Goalkeeper

Youth career
- Bellshill Athletic

Senior career*
Years	Team	Apps	(Gls)
1958–1962	Albion Rovers	95	(0)
1962–1963	Cheltenham Town		
1963–1969	Hamilton Academical	189	(0)
1969–1970	Albion Rovers	16	(0)
1971–1972	Hamilton Academical	6	(0)
Total		306	(0)

Managerial career
- 1969: Hamilton Academical
- 1977–1981: East Stirlingshire
- 1981–1984: Dumbarton
- 1984–1987: Falkirk
- 1987–1988: Partick Thistle
- 1989–1990: Falkirk
- 1990–1993: Dumbarton
- 1993–1995: Alloa Athletic
- * Club domestic league appearances and goals

Billy Lamont (12 May 1936 – October 2021) was a Scottish football player and manager.

Born in Larkhall, Lamont played as a goalkeeper for Bellshill Athletic, Cheltenham Town, Hamilton Academical and Albion Rovers.

He managed Hamilton during his first spell as a player there. After retiring as a player, Lamont managed East Stirlingshire. Lamont enjoyed some success with the club, guiding them to promotion in 1979–80 and a place in the quarter-finals of the 1980–81 Scottish Cup. He then managed Dumbarton and guided them to near the top of the Scottish First Division in the 1983–84 season, but left the club in February 1984 to manage Falkirk.

Lamont guided Falkirk to promotion to the Scottish Premier Division in 1985–86, but then left the club in February 1987 because he believed that the club needed a full-time manager to compete in the Premier Division and he was unwilling to relinquish his other job. After leaving Falkirk, Lamont then managed Partick Thistle. He returned to Falkirk in November 1989 on a part-time basis, but was sacked a few months later after the club was taken over by new owners. Lamont then returned to Dumbarton. In season 1991-92 Billy successfully led Dumbarton to the First Division by winning the Scottish Second Division and later managed Alloa Athletic.

After retiring from the game, Lamont resided in Spain. He died in October 2021, at the age of 85.

== Honours ==
East Stirlingshire

- Scottish Second Division promotion: 1979–80

Dumbarton

- Stirlingshire Cup: 1982–83, 1990–91
- Scottish Second Division: 1991–92

Falkirk

- Scottish First Division promotion: 1985–86
