= Laurie Williams (footballer) =

Scottish footballer

Personal information
- Full name: Lawrence Whiteside Williams
- Date of birth: 16 November 1948 (age 77)
- Place of birth: Johnstone
- Position: Goalkeeper

Youth career
- Port Glasgow Juniors

Senior career*
| Years | Team | Apps | (Gls) |
| 1969–1981 | Dumbarton | 296 | (0) |
| 1980–1981 | → Motherwell (loan) | 4 | (0) |
| 1980–1981 | → Dundee (loan) | 4 | (0) |
| 1981–1982 | Greenock Morton | | |
- * Club domestic league appearances and goals

Lawrence Whiteside "Lawrie" Williams (born 16 November 1948) was a Scottish footballer who played for Dumbarton and Greenock Morton. He also had brief loan spells with Motherwell and Dundee.
