= Martin McGowan (footballer) =

Scottish footballer

Personal information
- Date of birth: 11 August 1962 (age 64)
- Position: Full back

Youth career
- Campsie Black Watch

Senior career*
Years	Team	Apps	(Gls)
1980–1986	Dumbarton	137	(3)
1985–1987	Clydebank	0	(0)
1986–1987	Stranraer	7	(0)
1986–1990	Albion Rovers	103	(7)
1986–1987	East Stirling	3	(0)
- * Club domestic league appearances and goals

Martin McGowan (born 11 August 1962) is a Scottish former footballer who played for Dumbarton, Clydebank, Stranraer, Albion Rovers and East Stirling.
