= Mark Clougherty =

Scottish footballer and manager

Personal information
- Full name: Mark Clougherty
- Date of birth: 20 September 1951 (age 75)
- Place of birth: Glasgow, Scotland
- Position: Defender

Senior career*
Years	Team	Apps	(Gls)
1974–1976	East Fife	44	(2)
1976–1977	Falkirk	52	(3)
1977–1980	Clyde	87	(1)
1980–1988	Dumbarton	223	(1)
Total		406	(7)

Managerial career
- 1987–1988: Dumbarton
- * Club domestic league appearances and goals

Mark Clougherty (born 20 September 1951) is a Scottish retired footballer.

Clougherty began his career with East Fife, before moving to Falkirk in 1976. A year later, he joined Clyde, making over 100 appearances for the Shawfield club in 3 years, before joining Dumbarton in 1980. He spent the rest of his career with the Sons, making over 250 appearances in 8 years.

== Honours ==
Dumbarton

- Stirlingshire Cup : 1987-88
