= David McCaig =

Scottish footballer

David McCaig is a Scottish former professional football player.

He began his career playing for the top boys' club Grangemouth International before joining Falkirk in 1973. McCaig made his professional debut against Celtic at the age of sixteen and spent three years at Falkirk, before joining Clyde in 1976.

He then moved to East Stirlingshire where he spent four seasons. He played in the promotion winning team of 1980. McCaig signed for Dumbarton in June 1982, following a two-month loan spell with the club at the end of the 1981–82 season. In his second season at Dumbarton, he was part of the team that won promotion to the Premier Division. In 1985 McCaig moved to Scottish First Division side East Fife where he spent less than one season before moving south to England to join Bishop's Stortford.
