= Pat McGowan (footballer) =

Scottish footballer

Patrick McGowan
Personal information
- Full name: Patrick McGowan
- Date of birth: 4 August 1959 (age 67)
- Position: Inside forward

Youth career
- Gartcosh

Senior career*
Years	Team	Apps	(Gls)
1977–1979	Airdrie		
1980–1989	Dumbarton	247	(19)
- * Club domestic league appearances and goals

Patrick McGowan (born 4 August 1959) was a Scottish footballer who played for Airdrie and Dumbarton.
