= Joe McGrogan =

Scottish footballer

Personal information
- Full name: Joseph McGrogan
- Date of birth: 30 March 1955 (age 71)
- Place of birth: Dumbarton, Scotland
- Position: Left winger

Youth career
- Yoker Athletic

Senior career*
Years	Team	Apps	(Gls)
1974–1982	Hamilton Academical	171	(31)
1982–1985	Dumbarton	21	(1)
- * Club domestic league appearances and goals

Joseph McGrogan (born 30 March 1955) is a Scottish former footballer, who played for Hamilton Academical and Dumbarton.
