= 1984–85 Scottish Premier Division =

79th season of top-tier football league in Scotland

Scottish Premier Division
- Season: 1984–85
- Champions: Aberdeen; 3rd Premier Division title 4th Scottish title
- Relegated: Dumbarton; Morton
- European Cup: Aberdeen
- UEFA Cup: Dundee United; Rangers; St Mirren
- Cup Winners' Cup: Celtic
- Matches: 180
- Goals: 522 (2.9 per match)
- Top goalscorer: Frank McDougall (23)
- Biggest home win: Dundee United 7–0 Morton
- Biggest away win: Morton 2–7 Celtic

The 1984–85 Scottish Premier Division season was won by Aberdeen, seven points ahead of Celtic. Dumbarton and Morton were relegated. As of 2026, this is the last season that a team other than Rangers or Celtic has won the top level of Scottish football; it also marked a third consecutive year that a team other than them won the Scottish title, the only time this has ever happened.

== Table ==
Pos	Team	Pld	W	D	L	GF	GA	GD	Pts	Qualification or relegation
1	Aberdeen (C)	36	27	5	4	89	26	+63	59	Qualification for the European Cup first round
2	Celtic	36	22	8	6	77	30	+47	52	Qualification for the Cup Winners' Cup first round
3	Dundee United	36	20	7	9	67	33	+34	47	Qualification for the UEFA Cup first round
4	Rangers	36	13	12	11	47	38	+9	38	Qualification for the UEFA Cup first round
5	St Mirren	36	17	4	15	51	56	−5	38	Qualification for the UEFA Cup first round
6	Dundee	36	15	7	14	48	50	−2	37	
7	Heart of Midlothian	36	13	5	18	47	64	−17	31	
8	Hibernian	36	10	7	19	38	61	−23	27	
9	Dumbarton (R)	36	6	7	23	29	64	−35	19	Relegation to the 1985–86 Scottish First Division
10	Morton (R)	36	5	2	29	29	100	−71	12	Relegation to the 1985–86 Scottish First Division

Source: Statto
Rules for classification: 1) points; 2) goal difference; 3) number of goals scored.
(C) Champions; (R) Relegated

== Results ==
=== Matches 1–18 ===
During matches 1–18 each team plays every other team twice (home and away).

Home \ Away	ABE	CEL	DUM	DND	DNU	HOM	HIB	MOR	RAN	STM
Aberdeen		4–2	1–0	3–2	0–1	4–0	4–1	3–1	0–0	4–0
Celtic	2–1		2–0	5–1	1–1	1–0	3–0	5–0	1–1	7–1
Dumbarton	0–2	1–1		2–1	2–2	0–1	2–2	3–1	1–2	0–1
Dundee	1–2	2–3	1–1		0–2	2–1	0–1	5–1	0–2	2–0
Dundee United	0–2	1–3	1–0	3–4		2–0	2–1	7–0	1–1	3–2
Heart of Midlothian	1–2	1–5	1–0	0–2	2–0		0–0	1–2	1–0	1–2
Hibernian	0–3	0–0	2–3	2–0	0–0	1–2		3–1	2–2	2–3
Morton	0–3	2–1	2–1	1–1	0–3	2–3	4–0		1–3	0–4
Rangers	1–2	0–0	0–0	0–0	1–0	1–1	2–0	2–0		0–0
St Mirren	0–2	1–2	0–0	2–1	1–0	2–3	2–0	2–1	0–2	

Legend: Blue = home team win; Yellow = draw; Red = away team win.

=== Matches 19–36 ===
During matches 19–36 each team plays every other team twice (home and away).

Home \ Away	ABE	CEL	DUM	DND	DNU	HOM	HIB	MOR	RAN	STM
Aberdeen		1–1	4–0	0–0	4–2	2–2	2–0	5–0	5–1	3–0
Celtic	2–0		2–0	0–1	1–2	3–2	0–1	4–0	1–1	3–0
Dumbarton	0–2	0–2		1–0	0–2	1–3	0–2	1–0	2–4	1–1
Dundee	0–4	2–0	1–0		1–0	3–0	2–0	0–0	2–2	1–0
Dundee United	2–1	0–0	4–0	4–0		5–2	2–0	5–0	2–1	3–1
Heart of Midlothian	0–3	0–2	5–1	3–3	0–1		2–2	1–0	2–0	0–1
Hibernian	0–5	0–1	3–1	0–1	1–1	1–2		5–1	1–0	0–4
Morton	1–2	2–7	2–4	0–1	0–3	0–1	1–2		0–3	0–2
Rangers	1–2	1–2	3–1	1–3	0–0	3–1	1–2	2–0		2–0
St Mirren	2–2	0–2	1–0	4–2	1–0	5–2	2–1	2–3	2–1	

Legend: Blue = home team win; Yellow = draw; Red = away team win.

== Awards ==
Award	Winner	Club
PFA Players' Player of the Year	(Scotland) Jim Duffy	Morton
PFA Young Player of the Year	(Scotland) Craig Levein	Heart of Midlothian
SFWA Footballer of the Year	(Scotland) Hamish McAlpine	Dundee United
