= Jim Hughes (footballer, born 1965) =

Scottish footballer

Personal information
- Full name: James Francis Hughes
- Date of birth: 7 May 1965 (age 61)
- Position: Defensive midfielder

Youth career
- Ferguslie United BC

Senior career*
Years	Team	Apps	(Gls)
1982–1984	Dumbarton	4	(0)
1984–1987	Airdrie	24	(0)
1986–1991	Ayr United	122	(3)
1990–1997	Stranraer	197	(4)
- * Club domestic league appearances and goals

James Francis Hughes (born 7 May 1965) is a Scottish former footballer who played for Dumbarton, Airdrie, Ayr United and Stranraer.

Following his career in football, Hughes went onto train as a teacher of primary education and is currently the Head Teacher of Stanley Primary School in Ardrossan in North Ayrshire, Scotland.
