= Albert Burnett =

Scottish footballer

Personal information
- Full name: Albert Burnett
- Date of birth: 10 October 1955 (age 71)
- Position: Wing half

Youth career
- Ashfield Benburb

Senior career*
Years	Team	Apps	(Gls)
1979–1982	Airdrie	1	(0)
1982–1984	Dumbarton	43	(0)
1984–1985	Falkirk	9	(1)
- * Club domestic league appearances and goals

Albert Burnett (born 10 October 1955) was a Scottish footballer who played for Airdrie, Dumbarton and Falkirk. Albert had previously played for Ashfield Juniors and Benburb Juniors. Benburb reached the Scottish Junior Cup Final played at Hampden Park on Saturday 17 May 1980 against Bailleston Juniors and Albert scored the opening goal. A crowd of around 9300 attended the game. The game finished 2-2 and a replay was held at Hampden Park two days later on Monday 2 June which ended in a 2–0 victory for Bailleston. The crowd here for the replay was even bigger with over 10,700 attending.
