= Tommy Coyle (footballer) =

Scottish footballer

Personal information
- Date of birth: 9 January 1959 (age 67)
- Place of birth: Glasgow, Scotland
- Position: Midfielder

Senior career*
Years	Team	Apps	(Gls)
19??–1978	Shettleston	?	(?)
1978–1987	Dumbarton	286	(22)
1987–1989	St Johnstone	68	(15)
1989–1991	Clydebank	42	(11)
- * Club domestic league appearances and goals

Thomas Coyle (born 9 January 1959) is a Scottish former professional football midfielder. His brothers Joe and Owen also played professionally.

Coyle began his career with non-league Shettleston before signing for Dumbarton in 1978. He established himself in the first team at Boghead Park and, along with Albert Craig, scored in a 2–2 draw with Clyde that ensured Dumbarton promotion to the Scottish Premier Division for the first time.

Aside from playing in the club's only season in the revamped top division Coyle appeared in the first team alongside both of his brothers. He left Dumbarton in 1987 and went on to play for St Johnstone and Clydebank.
