= Raymond Blair =

Scottish footballer

Personal information
- Full name: Raymond Blair
- Date of birth: 12 November 1958 (age 67)
- Position: Outside right

Youth career
- Dunipace

Senior career*
Years	Team	Apps	(Gls)
1976–1983	Dumbarton	189	(46)
1982–1985	St Johnstone	52	(5)
1984–1986	Motherwell	52	(8)
1986–1988	East Fife	81	(17)
1989–1994	West Adelaide	95	(17)
- * Club domestic league appearances and goals

Raymond Blair (born 12 November 1958) was a Scottish footballer who played for Dumbarton, St Johnstone, Motherwell and East Fife, before moving to Australia to play with West Adelaide in the National Soccer League.
