= Albert Craig (footballer) =

Scottish footballer (born 1962)

Personal information
- Full name: Albert Hughes Craig
- Date of birth: 3 January 1962 (age 64)
- Place of birth: Glasgow, Scotland
- Height: 5 ft 8 in (1.73 m)
- Position: Midfielder

Senior career*
Years	Team	Apps	(Gls)
1981–1986	Dumbarton	137	(23)
1986–1987	Hamilton Academical	16	(5)
1987–1989	Newcastle United	10	(0)
1988	→ Hamilton Academical (loan)	6	(1)
1989	→ Northampton Town (loan)	2	(1)
1989–1992	Dundee	63	(14)
1992–1996	Partick Thistle	106	(19)
1996–1998	Falkirk	53	(10)
1998–1999	Stenhousemuir	32	(7)
1999–2000	Partick Thistle	29	(4)
Total		455	(83)
- * Club domestic league appearances and goals

Albert Hughes Craig (born 3 January 1962) is a Scottish former footballer, who played as a midfielder.

== Career ==
Craig began his career with Dumbarton in 1981 and made over 150 appearances for the Sons over a five-year period. A move to Hamilton Academical in 1986 was quickly followed by a further transfer to Newcastle United for £95,000 just six months later after impressing in the Accies' win away at Rangers in the 1986–87 Scottish Cup; however he played just ten times for the Magpies. Loan spells back at Hamilton and also with Northampton Town preceded a move back to Scotland with Dundee in 1989.

Craig spent three years at Dens Park before moving to Partick Thistle in August 1992, where he went on to make over 100 league appearances. In 1996, Craig moved to Falkirk before year-long spells with Stenhousemuir and a return to Partick Thistle to finish his career.

== Personal life ==
Off the pitch, Craig received a twelve-month prison sentence in July 2005 after admitting stealing over £40,000 from the Royal Mail in a postal fraud.

== Honours ==
=== Dundee ===
- Scottish First Division: 1

1991–92

=== Falkirk ===
- Scottish Challenge Cup: 1

1997–98
