= Tom Carson (footballer) =

Scottish footballer & coach (born 1959)

Personal information
- Date of birth: 27 March 1958 (age 68)
- Place of birth: Alexandria, Scotland
- Position: Goalkeeper

Senior career*
Years	Team	Apps	(Gls)
	Vale of Leven	-	
1979–1984	Dumbarton	149	(0)
1984–1991	Dundee	77	(0)
1986–1987	→ Hibernian (loan)	2	(0)
1987–1988	→ Partick Thistle (loan)	6	(0)
1987–1988	→ Queen of the South (loan)	7	(0)
1987–1988	→ Dunfermline (loan)	4	(0)
1987–1988	→ Ipswich Town (loan)	1	(0)
1987–1988	→ Dunfermline (loan)	1	(0)
1991–1992	→ Dumbarton (loan)	6	(0)
1992–1994	Raith Rovers	35	(0)
- Vale of Leven
2002–2003	Dumbarton	0	(0)

Managerial career
- 2000–2002: Dumbarton
- * Club domestic league appearances and goals

Tom Carson (born 27 March 1959) is a Scottish football player and coach. Carson played as a goalkeeper for several clubs, including Dundee, Raith Rovers and Dumbarton. He later managed Dumbarton between 2000 and 2002.

== History ==
Tom (or Tam, as he is sometimes known) was brought up in Alexandria, West Dunbartonshire, an area rich in footballing history. One of Tom's 3 brothers, Joe Carson, also played football professionally for Arbroath, Motherwell & Partick Thistle among others.

During his time at Dundee, Carson was sent out on loan 7 times, usually as cover for injuries. His spell at Queen of the South was in the era of the likes of George Cloy.

Carson took his first (and only to date) managerial position in October 2000, taking charge of Dumbarton. He led the team to promotion to the Scottish Second Division in the 2001/02 season, but left soon after. This was rumoured to be after a disagreement between Tom and the board about the amount of money needed to retain the club's new second division status. He was succeeded by David Winnie.

In April 2002, Tom officially registered himself as a squad player to cover injuries but did not make any appearances.

Tom has not returned to football since the end of the 2001/2 season but has often been rumoured as returning to the job whenever the position becomes available. He was also rumoured to be among the running for the vacant Elgin City job in 2003.

== Managerial history ==
includes all league, cup & friendly games

Club	Nat.	Div.	From	To	Record				
Club	Nat.	Div.	From	To	P	W	D	L	Win%
Dumbarton	(Scotland)	Third	October 2000	June 2002	72	34	13	25	47.2
