= Rob Campbell (footballer) =

Scottish footballer

Personal information
- Full name: Robert Campbell
- Date of birth: 19 May 1961 (age 65)
- Place of birth: Paisley, Scotland
- Height: 6 ft 0 in (1.83 m)
- Position: Full back

Youth career
- Ferguslie United

Senior career*
Years	Team	Apps	(Gls)
1978–1982	Dumbarton	50	(0)
1982–1983	Cowdenbeath	11	(1)
1984–1985	Queen of the South	13	(3)
1984–1985	Dumbarton	1	(0)
- * Club domestic league appearances and goals

Robert Campbell (born 19 May 1961) was a Scottish footballer who played for Dumbarton and Cowdenbeath.
