= Mike Rankin =

Scottish footballer

Personal information
- Date of birth: 3 December 1960 (age 65)
- Position: Winger

Youth career
- Clydeview Thistle

Senior career*
Years	Team	Apps	(Gls)
1978–1983	Dumbarton	55	(6)
- * Club domestic league appearances and goals

Michael Rankin (born 3 December 1960) is a Scottish former footballer who played for Dumbarton.
