= Alistair Brown (footballer, born 1957) =

Scottish footballer

Ally Brown
Personal information
- Full name: Alistair D Brown
- Date of birth: 29 March 1957 (age 69)
- Position: Forward

Youth career
- Vale of Leven BC

Senior career*
Years	Team	Apps	(Gls)
1973–1983	Dumbarton	242	(32)
1983–1984	Stirling Albion		
- * Club domestic league appearances and goals

Alistair D. Brown (born 29 March 1957) was a Scottish footballer who played most of his 'senior' career with Dumbarton. After ten years as a permanent fixture in the Dumbarton line-up, he moved to Stirling Albion.
