= Graeme Sinclair =

Scottish footballer (born 1957)

Personal information
- Full name: James Graeme Sinclair
- Date of birth: 1 July 1957 (age 69)
- Place of birth: Paisley, Scotland
- Position: Full back

Senior career*
| Years | Team | Apps | (Gls) |
| 1976–1982 | Dumbarton | 203 | (2) |
| 1982–1985 | Celtic | 52 | (1) |
| 1984 | → Manchester City (loan) | 1 | (0) |
| 1984–1985 | → Dumbarton (loan) | 5 | (0) |
| 1985 | St Mirren | 0 | (0) |

International career
| 1977 | Scotland U21 | 1 | (0) |
| 1978–1980 | Scottish League XI | 2 | (0) |
- * Club domestic league appearances and goals

James Graeme Sinclair (born 1 July 1957) is a Scottish former footballer, who played for Dumbarton, Celtic, Manchester City and St Mirren. Sinclair man-marked Johan Cruyff when Celtic beat Ajax in a 1982–83 European Cup tie. Sinclair won a Scottish League Cup winner's medal in December 1982 when he played in the Celtic side that won 2-1 in the final against Rangers. In November 1984 his former Celtic manager Billy McNeill signed him on loan for Manchester City. He made his debut in a 4–1 League Cup defeat at Chelsea, but made just one league appearance, against Portsmouth, in which he was substituted at half-time.
