= Joe Coyle =

Scottish footballer

Personal information
- Full name: Joseph Coyle
- Date of birth: 24 June 1957 (age 69)
- Place of birth: Glasgow, Scotland
- Position: Midfielder

Senior career*
| Years | Team | Apps | (Gls) |
| 19??–1977 | Shettleston | ? | (?) |
| 1977–1982 | Dumbarton | 130 | (14) |
| 1982–1983 | Airdrieonians | 14 | (1) |
| 1983–1985 | Dumbarton | 75 | (21) |
| 1985–1986 | Greenock Morton | 18 | (0) |
| 1986–1987 | Arbroath | 24 | (3) |
| 1987–1988 | Stranraer | 23 | (4) |
| 1988–? | Vale of Leven | ? | (?) |
- * Club domestic league appearances and goals

Joseph Coyle (born 24 June 1957 in Glasgow) is a Scottish former professional football midfielder. His brothers Tommy and Owen also played professionally.

Coyle began his career with non-league Shettleston before signing for Dumbarton in 1977. He remained at Dumbarton until 1982 before moving to Airdrieonians in 1982. However, he soon returned to Boghead Park and was with the Sons for their only season in the Scottish Premier Division. Subsequently, he played in the Scottish Football League for Greenock Morton, Arbroath and Stranraer before ending his career with non-league Vale of Leven.

In the early 21st century, Coyle was involved in the management of amateur clubs in the Greater Glasgow area, including Orchard Parkmount and Muirend.
