= Donald McNeil (footballer) =

Scottish footballer

Personal information
- Full name: Richard Donald McNeil
- Date of birth: 20 February 1958 (age 68)
- Position: Left half

Youth career
- Eastercraigs

Senior career*
Years	Team	Apps	(Gls)
1975–1991	Dumbarton	276	(17)
- * Club domestic league appearances and goals

Richard 'Donald' McNeil (born 20 February 1958) was a Scottish footballer who played his entire 'senior' career with Dumbarton.
