= 1985–86 Dundee F.C. season =

Dundee
1985–86 season
- Manager: Archie Knox
- Premier Division: 6th
- Scottish Cup: Quarter-finals
- League Cup: 3rd round
- Top goalscorer: League: Ray Stephen (14); All: Ray Stephen (18)
Home colours

The 1985–86 season was the 84th season in which Dundee competed at a Scottish national level, playing in the Scottish Premier Division. Dundee would finish in 6th place for the second consecutive season. Dundee would also compete in both the Scottish League Cup and the Scottish Cup, where they were knocked out of the League Cup by Hamilton Academical in the 3rd round, and were defeated by Aberdeen in the quarter-finals of the Scottish Cup.

During this season, the club would incorporate a single stripe onto their classic navy shirts, diagonally split displaying red and white. This season would be most memorable for Dundee's final game of the league season, where a late double from substitute Albert Kidd would help Dundee defeat Heart of Midlothian, inadvertently ending their title hopes and allowing Celtic to win instead, resulting in Kidd becoming a cult figure for the Celtic fanbase, as well as for those of Hibernian faith.

== Scottish Premier Division ==
Statistics provided by Dee Archive.

Match day	Date	Opponent	H/A	Score	Dundee scorer(s)	Attendance
1	10 August	St Mirren	H	2–1	Connor (2) (pen.)	6,474
2	17 August	Clydebank	A	0–4		2,500
3	24 August	Dundee United	A	0–2		13,736
4	31 August	Aberdeen	H	1–3	Black	7,592
5	7 September	Motherwell	A	3–1	McCormack, Brown, Harvey	2,607
6	14 September	Hibernian	H	1–0	Brown	5,410
7	21 September	Rangers	A	1–0	Rafferty	23,600
8	28 September	Celtic	H	0–2		15,387
9	5 October	Heart of Midlothian	A	1–1	McWilliams	8,512
10	12 October	St Mirren	A	0–1		4,250
11	19 October	Clydebank	H	2–0	Stephen (2)	4,160
12	26 October	Motherwell	H	3–1	Harvey, Stephen, McCormack	4,628
13	2 November	Hibernian	A	1–2	Glennie	6,474
14	9 November	Aberdeen	A	1–4	Stephen	12,800
15	16 November	Dundee United	H	0–3		11,736
16	23 November	Rangers	H	3–2	Brown (3) (pen.)	10,798
17	7 December	Heart of Midlothian	H	1–1	Brown	10,780
18	14 December	St Mirren	H	3–1	Brown, Harvey, Stephen	4,290
19	23 December	Clydebank	A	0–0		1,350
20	28 December	Dundee United	A	0–0		14,869
21	1 January	Aberdeen	H	0–0		9,096
22	4 January	Rangers	A	0–5		13,954
23	11 January	Hibernian	H	3–1	Brown (pen.), Stephen (2)	5,073
24	18 January	Motherwell	A	2–2	Rafferty, Brown (pen.)	2,204
25	1 February	Celtic	H	1–3	Stephen (pen.)	12,295
26	8 February	Heart of Midlothian	A	1–3	Mennie	15,365
27	22 February	St Mirren	A	2–1	Stephen (2)	3,123
28	1 March	Clydebank	H	4–0	Harvey, Stephen (3)	4,033
29	15 March	Rangers	H	2–1	Brown (pen.), Harvey	10,965
30	22 March	Aberdeen	A	0–0		13,013
31	29 March	Dundee United	H	0–1		15,079
32	2 April	Celtic	A	1–2	Stephen	12,506
33	12 April	Hibernian	A	0–1		4,477
34	19 April	Motherwell	H	4–0	Forsyth, Glennie, Rafferty	3,745
35	26 April	Celtic	H	0–2		13,521
36	11 May	Heart of Midlothian	H	2–0	Kidd (2)	19,567

=== League table ===
Pos	Team	Pld	W	D	L	GF	GA	GD	Pts	Qualification
4	Aberdeen	36	16	12	8	62	31	+31	44	Qualification for the Cup Winners' Cup first round
5	Rangers	36	13	9	14	53	45	+8	35	Qualification for the UEFA Cup first round
6	Dundee	36	14	7	15	45	51	−6	35	
7	St Mirren	36	13	5	18	42	63	−21	31	
8	Hibernian	36	11	6	19	49	63	−14	28	

Source: Rsssf
Rules for classification: 1) points; 2) goal difference; 3) number of goals scored.

== Scottish League Cup ==
Statistics provided by Dee Archive.

Match day	Date	Opponent	H/A	Score	Dundee scorer(s)	Attendance
2nd round	21 August	Stranraer	A	3–2	Smith, Stephen (2)	1,554
3rd round	28 August	Hamilton Academical	A	1–2 (A.E.T.)	Kidd	2,234

== Scottish Cup ==
Statistics provided by Dee Archive.

Match day	Date	Opponent	H/A	Score	Dundee scorer(s)	Attendance
3rd round	25 January	Nairn County	A	7–0	Rafferty, Shannon (2), Harvey (3), Hendry	3,600
4th round	19 February	Airdrieonians	H	2–0	Stephen, Mennie	4,010
Quarter-finals	8 March	Aberdeen	H	2–2	Brown, Harvey	13,188
QF replay	12 March	Aberdeen	A	1–2 (A.E.T.)	Stephen	21,000

== Player statistics ==
Statistics provided by Dee Archive

No.	Pos	Nat	Player	Total		First Division		Scottish Cup		League Cup	
No.	Pos	Nat	Player	Apps	Goals	Apps	Goals	Apps	Goals	Apps	Goals
	FW	(Scotland) SCO	Russell Black	1	1	1	1	0	0	0	0
	MF	(Scotland) SCO	John Brown	32	12	28+1	11	2	1	1	0
	DF	(Scotland) SCO	Stevie Campbell	5	0	2+3	0	0	0	0	0
	MF	(Scotland) SCO	Bobby Connor	41	2	35	2	4	0	2	0
	MF	(Scotland) SCO	Danny Crainie	3	0	0+3	0	0	0	0	0
	DF	(Scotland) SCO	Jim Duffy	42	0	36	0	4	0	2	0
	DF	(Scotland) SCO	Stewart Forsyth	13	1	7+2	1	4	0	0	0
	GK	(Scotland) SCO	Bobby Geddes	42	0	36	0	4	0	2	0
	DF	(Scotland) SCO	Bobby Glennie	37	2	32+1	2	1+1	0	2	0
	FW	(Scotland) SCO	Graham Harvey	36	9	25+5	5	3+1	4	1+1	0
	FW	(Scotland) SCO	Colin Hendry	22	1	10+9	0	2+1	1	0	0
	MF	(Scotland) SCO	Ross Jack	8	0	5+1	0	1	0	1	0
	FW	(Scotland) SCO	Albert Kidd	14	3	4+8	2	0+1	0	1	1
	FW	(Scotland) SCO	Walker McCall	2	0	0+2	0	0	0	0	0
	DF	(Scotland) SCO	John McCormack	31	2	15+12	2	1+1	0	2	0
	DF	(Scotland) SCO	George McGeachie	2	0	1+1	0	0	0	0	0
	DF	(Scotland) SCO	Tosh McKinlay	26	0	22	0	4	0	0	0
	MF	(Scotland) SCO	Derek McWilliams	11	1	6+5	1	0	0	0	0
	MF	(West Germany) FRG	Vince Mennie	14	2	11	1	3	1	0	0
	MF	(Scotland) SCO	Stuart Rafferty	34	4	23+6	3	1+2	1	2	0
	DF	(Scotland) SCO	Rab Shannon	39	2	33	0	4	2	2	0
	MF	(Scotland) SCO	Jim Smith	37	1	32	0	3	0	2	1
	FW	(Scotland) SCO	Ray Stephen	38	18	32+1	14	3	2	2	2
	DF	(England) ENG	John Waddell	2	0	0+2	0	0	0	0	0

== See also ==
- List of Dundee F.C. seasons
