= 1986–87 Dundee F.C. season =

Dundee
1986–87 season
- Manager: Jocky Scott
- Premier Division: 6th
- Scottish Cup: Semi-finals
- League Cup: Quarter-finals
- Top goalscorer: League: Graham Harvey (12); All: Graham Harvey (17)
Home colours

The 1986–87 season was the 85th season in which Dundee competed at a Scottish national level, playing in the Scottish Premier Division. Dundee would finish in 6th place for the third consecutive season. Dundee would also compete in both the Scottish League Cup and the Scottish Cup, where they were knocked out in the League Cup by Rangers in the quarter-finals, and by inter-city rivals Dundee United in the semi-finals of the Scottish Cup.

== Scottish Premier Division ==
Statistics provided by Dee Archive.

Match day	Date	Opponent	H/A	Score	Dundee scorer(s)	Attendance
1	9 August	Celtic	A	0–1		35,443
2	13 August	St Mirren	H	2–1	Ferguson, Stephen	4,212
3	16 August	Hibernian	H	3–0	Ferguson, Angus, Harvey	7,216
4	23 August	Falkirk	A	1–0	Stephen	5,000
5	30 August	Aberdeen	A	0–2		12,486
6	6 September	Dundee United	H	0–2		12,079
7	13 September	Motherwell	A	0–0		2,880
8	20 September	Rangers	H	1–0	Brown	17,132
9	27 September	Heart of Midlothian	H	0–0		9,947
10	4 October	Clydebank	A	2–0	Harvey, Stephen	1,507
11	8 October	Hamilton Academical	A	3–0	Brown (pen.), Stephen, Harvey	1,941
12	11 October	Celtic	H	0–3		15,351
13	18 October	St Mirren	A	1–4	Hendry	3,032
14	25 October	Falkirk	H	3–0	Harvey, Angus, Hendry	3,715
15	29 October	Hibernian	A	3–0	Jack, Stephen, Rafferty	4,221
16	1 November	Aberdeen	H	0–2		8,200
17	8 November	Dundee United	A	3–0	Harvey (2), Shannon	11,733
18	15 November	Motherwell	H	1–1	Harvey	4,167
19	19 November	Rangers	A	1–2	Shannon	22,992
20	22 November	Heart of Midlothian	A	1–3	Angus	12,094
21	29 November	Clydebank	H	3–3	Rafferty, Harvey (2)	2,947
22	3 December	Hamilton Academical	H	3–3	Brown (2), Duffy (pen.)	2,525
23	6 December	Celtic	A	0–2		19,300
24	13 December	St Mirren	H	6–3	Wright (2), Brown, Duffy (pen.), Harvey (2)	3,498
25	27 December	Hibernian	H	2–0	Shannon, Angus	6,251
26	1 January	Aberdeen	A	1–2	Jack	11,000
27	24 January	Heart of Midlothian	H	0–1		8,387
28	27 January	Motherwell	A	0–2		2,340
29	7 February	Clydebank	A	1–1	Coyne	1,037
30	14 February	Hamilton Academical	A	1–1	Coyne (pen.)	2,019
31	28 February	Celtic	H	4–1	Mennie, Shannon, Brown, Jack	12,455
32	7 March	St Mirren	A	1–0	McKinlay	2,294
33	10 March	Dundee United	H	1–1	Brown	11,615
34	17 March	Rangers	H	0–4		18,723
35	21 March	Hibernian	A	2–2	Coyne, Mitchell (o.g.)	4,305
36	25 March	Falkirk	H	4–0	Lawrence, Jack (pen.), Wright, Brown	2,997
37	28 March	Dundee United	A	1–1	Rafferty	12,220
38	4 April	Aberdeen	H	1–1	Brown	4,346
39	14 April	Rangers	A	0–2		42,472
40	18 April	Motherwell	H	4–1	Wright, McKinlay, Coyne (2)	3,080
41	21 April	Falkirk	A	0–0		
42	25 April	Clydebank	H	4–1	Coyne (3), Wright	2,598
43	2 May	Heart of Midlothian	A	3–1	Wright (2), Rafferty	7,818
44	9 May	Hamilton Academical	H	7–3	Brown, Wright (3), Shannon, Coyne (pen.), Harvey	3,536

=== League table ===
Pos	Team	Pld	W	D	L	GF	GA	GD	Pts	Qualification or relegation
4	Aberdeen	44	21	16	7	63	29	+34	58	Qualification for the UEFA Cup first round
5	Heart of Midlothian	44	21	14	9	64	43	+21	56	
6	Dundee	44	18	12	14	74	57	+17	48	
7	St Mirren	44	12	12	20	36	51	−15	36	Qualification for the Cup Winners' Cup first round
8	Motherwell	44	11	12	21	43	64	−21	34	

Source: Statto
Rules for classification: 1) points; 2) goal difference; 3) number of goals scored.

== Scottish League Cup ==
Statistics provided by Dee Archive.

Match day	Date	Opponent	H/A	Score	Dundee scorer(s)	Attendance
2nd round	20 August	Greenock Morton	A	5–2(A.E.T.)	Harvey (2), Stephen, Angus (2)	2,097
3rd round	27 August	Montrose	H	4–0	Jack, Shannon, Harvey, Brown (pen.)	3,851
Quarter-finals	3 September	Rangers	A	1–3 (A.E.T.)	Forsyth	33,750

== Scottish Cup ==
Statistics provided by Dee Archive.

Match day	Date	Opponent	H/A	Score	Dundee scorer(s)	Attendance
3rd round	4 February	East Fife	H	2–2	Smith, Coyne	4,856
3R replay	9 February	East Fife	A	4–1	Harvey, Wright, Coyne, Jack	4,958
4th round	21 February	Meadowbank Thistle	H	1–1	Harvey	3,592
4R replay	25 February	Meadowbank Thistle	A	1–1 (A.E.T.)	Jack	4,000
4R 2nd replay	2 March	Meadowbank Thistle	H	2–0	Coyne (2) (pen.)	4,516
Quarter-finals	14 March	Clydebank	A	4–0	Wright, Coyne, Brown (2)	5,222
Semi-finals	11 April	Dundee United	N	2–3	Coyne, Wright	13,913

== Player statistics ==
Statistics provided by Dee Archive

No.	Pos	Nat	Player	Total		First Division		Scottish Cup		League Cup	
No.	Pos	Nat	Player	Apps	Goals	Apps	Goals	Apps	Goals	Apps	Goals
	MF	(Scotland) SCO	Ian Angus	36	6	28+1	4	3+1	0	3	2
	MF	(Scotland) SCO	John Brown	39	13	31	10	4+1	2	3	1
	DF	(Scotland) SCO	Stevie Campbell	4	0	2+2	0	0	0	0	0
	MF	(Scotland) SCO	Bobby Connor	2	0	2	0	0	0	0	0
	FW	(Republic of Ireland) IRL	Tommy Coyne	27	15	20	9	7	6	0	0
	FW	(Scotland) SCO	Lee Davidson	1	0	0+1	0	0	0	0	0
	DF	(Scotland) SCO	Jim Duffy	51	2	42	2	6	0	3	0
	FW	(Scotland) SCO	Iain Ferguson	3	2	2+1	2	0	0	0	0
	DF	(Scotland) SCO	Stewart Forsyth	37	1	25+3	0	4+2	0	3	1
	GK	(Scotland) SCO	Bobby Geddes	54	0	44	0	7	0	3	0
	DF	(Scotland) SCO	Bobby Glennie	24	0	17+1	0	5+1	0	0	0
	FW	(Scotland) SCO	Graham Harvey	41	17	28+5	12	4+1	2	3	3
	FW	(Scotland) SCO	Colin Hendry	13	2	3+9	2	0+1	0	0	0
	MF	(Scotland) SCO	Ross Jack	36	7	21+7	4	4+1	2	1+2	1
	FW	(Scotland) SCO	Albert Kidd	9	0	6+1	0	0	0	0+2	0
	FW	(Scotland) SCO	Alan Lawrence	4	1	3+1	1	0	0	0	0
	DF	(Scotland) SCO	George McGeachie	30	0	23+4	0	0	0	2+1	0
	DF	(Scotland) SCO	Tosh McKinlay	41	2	32	2	6	0	3	0
	MF	(Scotland) SCO	Derek McWilliams	6	0	4+2	0	0	0	0	0
	MF	(West Germany) FRG	Vince Mennie	25	1	13+7	1	5	0	0	0
	MF	(Scotland) SCO	Stuart Rafferty	44	4	28+8	4	5+2	0	1	0
	DF	(Scotland) SCO	Rab Shannon	49	6	39	5	7	0	3	1
	MF	(Scotland) SCO	Jim Smith	49	1	39	0	6	1	4	0
	FW	(Scotland) SCO	Ray Stephen	19	6	17	5	0	0	2	1
	FW	(Scotland) SCO	Keith Wright	25	13	15+5	10	4+1	3	0	0

== See also ==
- List of Dundee F.C. seasons
