= 1987–88 Dundee F.C. season =

Dundee
1987–88 season
- Manager: Jocky Scott
- Premier Division: 7th
- Scottish Cup: Quarter-finals
- League Cup: Semi-finals
- Top goalscorer: League: Tommy Coyne (33); All: Tommy Coyne (37)
Home colours

The 1987–88 season was the 86th season in which Dundee competed at a Scottish national level, playing in the Scottish Premier Division. Dundee would finish in 7th place. Dundee would also compete in both the Scottish League Cup and the Scottish Cup, where they were knocked out by Aberdeen in the semi-finals of the League Cup, and by inter-city rivals Dundee United in a second replay in the quarter-finals of the Scottish Cup.

Dundee would change kit manufacturers to Matchwinner, introducing white and red stripes to the top of their jersey. Striker Tommy Coyne would top the Premier Division scoring charts with 33 goals in the league.

== Scottish Premier Division ==
Statistics provided by Dee Archive.

Match day	Date	Opponent	H/A	Score	Dundee scorer(s)	Attendance
1	8 August	Aberdeen	H	1–1	Angus	10,223
2	12 August	Falkirk	A	3–0	Brown (2), Wright	3,750
3	15 August	Hibernian	A	4–0	Coyne (2) (pen.), Wright, Brown	7,925
4	22 August	St Mirren	H	0–2		5,969
5	29 August	Dunfermline Athletic	H	5–0	Coyne (4) (pen.), Wright	7,564
6	5 September	Rangers	A	1–2	Harvey	38,302
7	12 September	Greenock Morton	A	3–4	Angus, Coyne (2) (pen.)	4,026
8	19 September	Heart of Midlothian	H	1–3	Smith	9,199
9	26 September	Motherwell	A	2–0	Harvey, Coyne	2,656
10	3 October	Dundee United	H	1–1	Coyne	11,497
11	7 October	Celtic	H	1–1	Angus	13,238
12	10 October	Aberdeen	A	0–0		12,500
13	17 October	Dunfermline Athletic	A	1–0	Lawrence	6,890
14	28 October	Greenock Morton	H	1–0	Harvey	3,829
15	31 October	Heart of Midlothian	A	2–4	Coyne, Wright	13,806
16	7 November	Falkirk	H	3–1	Coyne (2) (pen.), Wright	4,324
17	14 November	Celtic	A	0–5		31,684
18	18 November	St Mirren	A	2–1	Coyne (pen.), Smith	3,328
19	21 November	Hibernian	H	2–1	Coyne (2)	6,586
20	24 November	Motherwell	H	2–0	Coyne, Mennie	3,695
21	28 November	Dundee United	A	3–1	Coyne (2), Wright	13,625
22	5 December	Aberdeen	H	1–2	Forsyth	8,799
23	12 December	Falkirk	A	6–0	Coyne (2), Wright (2), Manley (2x o.g.)	4,500
24	16 December	Greenock Morton	A	7–1	Wright (2), Coyne (3), McGeachie, Harvey	3,500
25	19 December	Heart of Midlothian	H	0–0		10,806
26	26 December	Rangers	A	0–2		40,938
27	1 January	Dunfermline Athletic	H	2–0	Coyne (2) (pen.)	8,527
28	6 January	Rangers	H	0–1		17,450
29	9 January	Motherwell	A	3–3	Coyne (2) (pen.), Angus	2,785
30	16 January	Dundee United	H	0–2		13,651
31	6 February	Hibernian	A	1–2	Wright	7,908
32	13 February	Celtic	H	1–2	Angus	17,106
33	27 February	Aberdeen	A	0–1		13,500
34	1 March	St Mirren	H	2–1	Coyne (2) (pen.)	4,265
35	5 March	Greenock Morton	H	1–0	Coyne	4,319
36	19 March	Dunfermline Athletic	A	1–6	Wright	5,507
37	26 March	Rangers	H	2–3	Angus, Coyne	14,879
38	30 March	Heart of Midlothian	A	0–2		9,649
39	2 April	Dundee United	A	0–1		13,874
40	6 April	Motherwell	H	1–2	Campbell	3,732
41	16 April	Falkirk	H	4–1	Wright (3), Coyne	4,970
42	23 April	Celtic	A	0–3		61,927
43	30 April	Hibernian	H	0–0		4,609
44	7 May	St Mirren	A	0–1		5,746

=== League table ===
Pos	Team	Pld	W	D	L	GF	GA	GD	Pts	Qualification or relegation
5	Dundee United	44	16	15	13	54	47	+7	47	Qualification for the Cup Winners' Cup first round
6	Hibernian	44	12	19	13	41	42	−1	43	
7	Dundee	44	17	7	20	70	64	+6	41	
8	Motherwell	44	13	10	21	37	56	−19	36	
9	St Mirren	44	10	15	19	41	64	−23	35	

Source: Statto
Rules for classification: 1) points; 2) goal difference; 3) number of goals scored.

== Scottish League Cup ==
Statistics provided by Dee Archive.

Match day	Date	Opponent	H/A	Score	Dundee scorer(s)	Attendance
2nd round	19 August	Queen's Park	A	3–0	McKinlay, Wright, Coyne	1,410
3rd round	26 August	Meadowbank Thistle	A	3–0	Coyne (2), Wright	2,500
Quarter-finals	2 September	Dundee United	H	2–1 (A.E.T.)	Coyne, Wright	19,817
Semi-finals	23 September	Aberdeen	N	0–2		22,034

== Scottish Cup ==
Statistics provided by Dee Archive.

Match day	Date	Opponent	H/A	Score	Dundee scorer(s)	Attendance
3rd round	30 January	Brechin City	H	0–0		5,040
3R replay	3 February	Brechin City	A	3–0	Harvey (2), Wright	3,012
4th round	20 February	Motherwell	H	2–0	Angus, Rafferty	7,243
Quarter-finals	12 March	Dundee United	H	0–0		19,355
QF replay	15 March	Dundee United	A	2–2 (A.E.T.)	Harvey (2)	17,055
QF 2nd replay	28 March	Dundee United	H	0–3		19,152

== Player statistics ==
Statistics provided by Dee Archive

No.	Pos	Nat	Player	Total		First Division		Scottish Cup		League Cup	
No.	Pos	Nat	Player	Apps	Goals	Apps	Goals	Apps	Goals	Apps	Goals
	MF	(Scotland) SCO	Ian Angus	50	7	39+1	6	6	1	4	0
	MF	(Scotland) SCO	John Brown	22	3	19+1	3	0	0	2	0
	DF	(Scotland) SCO	Stevie Campbell	8	1	6+1	1	0+1	0	0	0
	GK	(Scotland) SCO	Tam Carson	8	0	6	0	2	0	0	0
	DF	(Scotland) SCO	Gordon Chisholm	15	0	15	0	0	0	0	0
	FW	(Republic of Ireland) IRL	Tommy Coyne	53	37	43	33	6	0	4	4
	DF	(Scotland) SCO	Jim Duffy	8	0	5	0	0	0	3	0
	DF	(Scotland) SCO	Stewart Forsyth	49	1	41	1	5	0	3	0
	DF	(Scotland) SCO	Stephen Frail	4	0	2+2	0	0	0	0	0
	GK	(Scotland) SCO	Bobby Geddes	46	0	38	0	4	0	4	0
	DF	(Scotland) SCO	Bobby Glennie	25	0	19	0	2	0	4	0
	FW	(Scotland) SCO	Graham Harvey	35	8	11+18	4	2+2	4	1+1	0
	MF	(Scotland) SCO	Ross Jack	7	0	0+4	0	0	0	0+3	0
	MF	(Scotland) SCO	Billy Kirkwood	9	0	9	0	0	0	0	0
	FW	(Scotland) SCO	Alan Lawrence	25	1	14+8	1	1+2	0	0	0
	MF	(Scotland) SCO	Dave MacFarlane	5	0	1+1	0	2+1	0	0	0
	DF	(Scotland) SCO	George McGeachie	16	1	12+2	1	0	0	1+1	0
	DF	(Scotland) SCO	Tosh McKinlay	28	1	19	0	5	0	4	1
	MF	(Scotland) SCO	Shaun McSkimming	1	0	1	0	0	0	0	0
	MF	(West Germany) FRG	Vince Mennie	37	1	27+2	1	5	0	3	0
	MF	(Scotland) SCO	Stuart Rafferty	35	1	26+3	0	6	1	0	0
	MF	(England) ENG	Gary Rowell	1	0	0+1	0	0	0	0	0
	DF	(England) ENG	Wes Saunders	14	0	11	0	3	0	0	0
	DF	(Scotland) SCO	Rab Shannon	39	0	31	0	5	0	3	0
	MF	(Scotland) SCO	Jim Smith	50	2	39+1	2	6	0	4	0
	FW	(Scotland) SCO	Keith Wright	52	19	40+2	15	6	1	4	3

== See also ==
- List of Dundee F.C. seasons
