= 1988–89 Dundee F.C. season =

Dundee
1988–89 season
- Manager: Dave Smith (until Jan. 1989) John Blackley (caretaker, Jan.–Feb. 1989) Gordon Wallace (from Feb. 1989)
- Premier Division: 8th
- Scottish Cup: 3rd round
- League Cup: Quarter-finals
- Top goalscorer: League: Tommy Coyne & Keith Wright (8); All: Keith Wright (10)
Home colours

The 1988–89 season was the 87th season in which Dundee competed at a Scottish national level, playing in the Scottish Premier Division. Dundee would finish in 8th place. Dundee would also compete in both the Scottish League Cup and the Scottish Cup, where they were knocked out by Rangers in the quarter-finals of the League Cup, and by inter-city rivals Dundee United in the 3rd round of the Scottish Cup.

== Scottish Premier Division ==
Statistics provided by Dee Archive.

| Match day | Date | Opponent | H/A | Score | Dundee scorer(s) | Attendance |
|---|---|---|---|---|---|---|
| 1 | 13 August | Aberdeen | H | 1–1 | Chisholm | 12,222 |
| 2 | 20 August | Motherwell | A | 1–1 | Wright | 3,803 |
| 3 | 27 August | St Mirren | A | 0–0 | | 3,805 |
| 4 | 3 September | Dundee United | H | 0–3 | | 14,927 |
| 5 | 17 September | Hamilton Academical | A | 0–1 | | 2,194 |
| 6 | 24 September | Celtic | H | 1–0 | Coyne | 15,574 |
| 7 | 28 September | Heart of Midlothian | A | 1–1 | Shannon | 8,392 |
| 8 | 1 October | Rangers | A | 0–2 | | 40,768 |
| 9 | 8 October | Hibernian | H | 2–1 | Chisholm, Coyne | 8,127 |
| 10 | 12 October | Motherwell | H | 1–1 | Wright | 4,161 |
| 11 | 29 October | Celtic | A | 3–2 | Frail, Harvey, Rafferty | 25,843 |
| 12 | 2 November | Hamilton Academical | H | 5–2 | Harvey, Wright, Coyne (3) | 3,857 |
| 13 | 5 November | Dundee United | A | 0–2 | | 14,882 |
| 14 | 12 November | St Mirren | H | 0–1 | | 4,657 |
| 15 | 16 November | Aberdeen | A | 0–1 | | 11,181 |
| 16 | 19 November | Rangers | H | 0–0 | | 16,514 |
| 17 | 26 November | Hibernian | A | 1–1 | Coyne | 8,461 |
| 18 | 3 December | Heart of Midlothian | H | 1–1 | Harvey | 6,909 |
| 19 | 10 December | Hamilton Academical | A | 0–1 | | 2,083 |
| 20 | 17 December | Motherwell | A | 0–1 | | 4,560 |
| 21 | 31 December | Aberdeen | H | 2–0 | Coyne (2) | 9,828 |
| 22 | 3 January | St Mirren | A | 1–1 | Wright | 4,920 |
| 23 | 7 January | Dundee United | H | 0–1 | | 16,332 |
| 24 | 14 January | Hibernian | H | 1–2 | McBride | 7,263 |
| 25 | 21 January | Rangers | A | 1–3 | Wright | 43,202 |
| 26 | 11 February | Heart of Midlothian | A | 1–3 | Lawrence | 10,432 |
| 27 | 25 February | Celtic | H | 0–3 | | 14,559 |
| 28 | 11 March | Aberdeen | A | 0–2 | | 11,800 |
| 29 | 25 March | Motherwell | H | 2–1 | McBride, Chisholm | 3,718 |
| 30 | 1 April | St Mirren | H | 2–1 | Campbell, Craig | 3,824 |
| 31 | 8 April | Dundee United | A | 1–2 | Saunders | 11,910 |
| 32 | 15 April | Heart of Midlothian | H | 2–1 | Chisholm, Wright | 6,993 |
| 33 | 22 April | Celtic | A | 1–2 | Harvey (pen.) | 16,105 |
| 34 | 29 April | Hamilton Academical | H | 1–0 | Craig | 4,100 |
| 35 | 6 May | Rangers | H | 1–2 | Wright | 14,889 |
| 36 | 13 May | Hibernian | A | 1–1 | Wright | 5,670 |

=== League table ===
| Pos | Team | Pld | W | D | L | GF | GA | GD | Pts | Qualification or relegation |
|---|---|---|---|---|---|---|---|---|---|---|
| 6 | Heart of Midlothian | 36 | 9 | 13 | 14 | 35 | 42 | −7 | 31 | |
| 7 | St Mirren | 36 | 11 | 7 | 18 | 39 | 55 | −16 | 29 | |
| 8 | Dundee | 36 | 9 | 10 | 17 | 34 | 48 | −14 | 28 | |
| 9 | Motherwell | 36 | 7 | 13 | 16 | 25 | 44 | −19 | 27 | |
| 10 | Hamilton Academical (R) | 36 | 6 | 2 | 28 | 19 | 76 | −57 | 14 | Relegation to the 1989–90 Scottish First Division |

Source: Statto
Rules for classification: 1) points; 2) goal difference; 3) number of goals scored.
(R) Relegated

== Scottish League Cup ==
Statistics provided by Dee Archive.

| Match day | Date | Opponent | H/A | Score | Dundee scorer(s) | Attendance |
|---|---|---|---|---|---|---|
| 2nd round | 17 August | Queen of the South | H | 5–1 | McGeachie, Harvey (3), Wright | 3,846 |
| 3rd round | 24 August | Falkirk | H | 2–1 | Wright, Lawrence | 4,962 |
| Quarter-finals | 31 August | Rangers | A | 1–4 | Rafferty | 39,667 |

== Scottish Cup ==
Statistics provided by Dee Archive.

| Match day | Date | Opponent | H/A | Score | Dundee scorer(s) | Attendance |
|---|---|---|---|---|---|---|
| 3rd round | 28 January | Dundee United | H | 1–2 | Angus | 18,117 |

== Player statistics ==
Statistics provided by Dee Archive

| No. | Pos | Nat | Player | Total | | First Division | | Scottish Cup | | League Cup | |
| No. | Pos | Nat | Player | Apps | Goals | Apps | Goals | Apps | Goals | Apps | Goals |
|---|---|---|---|---|---|---|---|---|---|---|---|
| | MF | (Scotland) SCO | Ian Angus | 16 | 1 | 12+3 | 0 | 1 | 1 | 0 | 0 |
| | FW | (Scotland) SCO | Duncan Campbell | 8 | 1 | 6+2 | 1 | 0 | 0 | 0 | 0 |
| | DF | (Scotland) SCO | Stevie Campbell | 27 | 0 | 18+6 | 0 | 0 | 0 | 3 | 0 |
| | GK | (Scotland) SCO | Tam Carson | 2 | 0 | 2 | 0 | 0 | 0 | 0 | 0 |
| | DF | (Scotland) SCO | Gordon Chisholm | 38 | 4 | 33+1 | 4 | 1 | 0 | 3 | 0 |
| | FW | (Republic of Ireland) IRL | Tommy Coyne | 30 | 8 | 26 | 8 | 1 | 0 | 2+1 | 0 |
| | DF | (Scotland) SCO | Mark Craib | 4 | 0 | 2+2 | 0 | 0 | 0 | 0 | 0 |
| | MF | (Scotland) SCO | Albert Craig | 6 | 2 | 6 | 2 | 0 | 0 | 0 | 0 |
| | DF | (Scotland) SCO | Stewart Forsyth | 37 | 0 | 33 | 0 | 1 | 0 | 3 | 0 |
| | DF | (Scotland) SCO | Stephen Frail | 24 | 1 | 21+2 | 1 | 1 | 0 | 0 | 0 |
| | GK | (Scotland) SCO | Bobby Geddes | 38 | 0 | 34 | 0 | 1 | 0 | 3 | 0 |
| | FW | (Scotland) SCO | Graham Harvey | 23 | 7 | 11+9 | 4 | 0 | 0 | 3 | 3 |
| | FW | (Scotland) SCO | John Hendry | 2 | 0 | 0+2 | 0 | 0 | 0 | 0 | 0 |
| | DF | (Scotland) SCO | John Holt | 12 | 0 | 10+1 | 0 | 1 | 0 | 0 | 0 |
| | MF | (Scotland) SCO | Billy Kirkwood | 16 | 0 | 10+2 | 0 | 1 | 0 | 2+1 | 0 |
| | FW | (Scotland) SCO | Alan Lawrence | 12 | 2 | 8+2 | 1 | 0 | 0 | 1+1 | 1 |
| | MF | (Scotland) SCO | Joe McBride | 18 | 2 | 13+4 | 2 | 1 | 0 | 0 | 0 |
| | DF | (Scotland) SCO | George McGeachie | 7 | 1 | 6 | 0 | 0 | 0 | 1 | 1 |
| | DF | (Scotland) SCO | Tosh McKinlay | 21 | 0 | 18 | 0 | 0 | 0 | 3 | 0 |
| | MF | (West Germany) FRG | Vince Mennie | 4 | 0 | 0+4 | 0 | 0 | 0 | 0 | 0 |
| | MF | (Scotland) SCO | Stuart Rafferty | 34 | 2 | 26+6 | 1 | 0+1 | 0 | 0+1 | 1 |
| | DF | (England) ENG | Wes Saunders | 34 | 1 | 30 | 1 | 1 | 0 | 3 | 0 |
| | DF | (Scotland) SCO | Rab Shannon | 30 | 1 | 29 | 1 | 0 | 0 | 0+1 | 0 |
| | MF | (Scotland) SCO | Jim Smith | 11 | 0 | 7 | 0 | 0+1 | 0 | 3 | 0 |
| | FW | (Scotland) SCO | Keith Wright | 39 | 10 | 35 | 8 | 1 | 0 | 3 | 2 |

== See also ==
- List of Dundee F.C. seasons
