= 1984–85 Dundee F.C. season =

Dundee
1984–85 season
- Manager: Archie Knox
- Premier Division: 6th
- Scottish Cup: Quarter-finals
- League Cup: Quarter-finals
- Top goalscorer: League: Ray Stephen (8); All: John Brown (11)
Home colours

The 1984–85 season was the 83rd season in which Dundee competed at a Scottish national level, playing in the Scottish Premier Division. Dundee would finish in 6th place. Dundee would also compete in both the Scottish League Cup and the Scottish Cup, where they would reach the quarter-finals both of the League Cup and Scottish Cup, before being defeated by Heart of Midlothian in the former and by Celtic in the latter.

== Scottish Premier Division ==
Statistics provided by Dee Archive.

Match day	Date	Opponent	H/A	Score	Dundee scorer(s)	Attendance
1	11 August	Aberdeen	A	2–3	Rafferty, Stephen	14,700
2	18 August	Hibernian	H	0–1		6,290
3	25 August	Dumbarton	A	1–2	Stephen	2,000
4	1 September	Rangers	H	0–2		14,156
5	8 September	Dundee United	A	4–3	McWilliams, McKinlay, Harris, Brown	14,190
6	15 September	St Mirren	H	2–0	Rafferty, Brown	5,913
7	22 September	Heart of Midlothian	A	2–0	McKinlay, Brown	7,511
8	29 September	Celtic	H	2–3	McCormack, Stephen	13,761
9	6 October	Greenock Morton	A	1–1	McWilliams	2,000
10	13 October	Aberdeen	H	1–2	Connor	10,990
11	20 October	Hibernian	A	0–2		5,032
12	27 October	Dumbarton	H	1–1	Smith	4,375
13	3 November	Rangers	A	0–0		14,588
14	10 November	Dundee United	H	0–2		14,423
15	17 November	St Mirren	A	1–2	Stephen	2,877
16	24 November	Heart of Midlothian	H	2–1	Richardson, Connor	6,414
17	1 December	Celtic	A	1–5	Connor	15,887
18	8 December	Greenock Morton	H	5–1	Stephen, McCall, Connor, Kidd (2)	3,525
19	15 December	Aberdeen	A	0–0		14,000
20	29 December	Hibernian	H	2–0	Stephen, Kidd	5,941
21	1 January	Dumbarton	A	0–1		2,500
22	5 January	Rangers	H	2–2	McCormack (2)	11,991
23	3 February	Heart of Midlothian	A	3–3	McCormack, Brown, Harvey	10,063
24	9 February	Celtic	H	2–0	Stephen, Connor (pen.)	12,087
25	20 February	St Mirren	H	1–0	Harvey	5,142
26	23 February	Greenock Morton	A	1–0	McGeachie	2,200
27	2 March	Hibernian	A	1–0	Brown	4,478
28	16 March	Aberdeen	H	0–4		9,161
29	23 March	Rangers	A	3–1	Rafferty, Connor, Stephen	9,954
30	3 April	Dundee United	A	0–4		15,167
31	6 April	St Mirren	A	2–4	McCormack (2)	3,500
32	13 April	Dumbarton	H	1–0	Rafferty	3,386
33	20 April	Heart of Midlothian	H	3–0	McCormack, Brown, McKinlay	7,421
34	27 April	Greenock Morton	H	0–0		3,454
35	4 May	Celtic	A	1–0	Brown	8,815
36	11 May	Dundee United	H	1–0	Connor	13,426

=== League table ===
Pos	Team	Pld	W	D	L	GF	GA	GD	Pts	Qualification or relegation
4	Rangers	36	13	12	11	47	38	+9	38	Qualification for the UEFA Cup first round
5	St Mirren	36	17	4	15	51	56	−5	38	Qualification for the UEFA Cup first round
6	Dundee	36	15	7	14	48	50	−2	37	
7	Heart of Midlothian	36	13	5	18	47	64	−17	31	
8	Hibernian	36	10	7	19	38	61	−23	27	

Source: Statto
Rules for classification: 1) points; 2) goal difference; 3) number of goals scored.

== Scottish League Cup ==
Statistics provided by Dee Archive.

Match day	Date	Opponent	H/A	Score	Dundee scorer(s)	Attendance
1st round	22 August	Hamilton Academical	H	3–0	McCall, Connor, Stephen	2,916
2nd round	29 August	Kilmarnock	H	1–1 (A.E.T.)	Brown	3,367
Dundee win 3–2 on penalties
Quarter-finals	5 September	Heart of Midlothian	H	0–1		8,818

== Scottish Cup ==
Statistics provided by Dee Archive.

Match day	Date	Opponent	H/A	Score	Dundee scorer(s)	Attendance
3rd round	5 February	St Johnstone	A	1–1	Brown	5,955
3R replay	6 February	St Johnstone	H	2–1	McWilliams, Connor (pen.)	5,444
4th round	16 February	Rangers	A	1–0	Brown	26,619
Quarter-finals	9 March	Celtic	H	1–1	Brown	21,301
QF replay	13 March	Celtic	A	1–2	Stephen	37,390

== Player statistics ==
Statistics provided by Dee Archive

No.	Pos	Nat	Player	Total		First Division		Scottish Cup		League Cup	
No.	Pos	Nat	Player	Apps	Goals	Apps	Goals	Apps	Goals	Apps	Goals
	MF	(Scotland) SCO	John Brown	42	11	33+1	7	5	3	3	1
	GK	(Scotland) SCO	Tam Carson	23	0	20	0	0	0	3	0
	MF	(Scotland) SCO	Bobby Connor	41	9	34	7	5	1	2	1
	FW	(Scotland) SCO	Robert Docherty	1	0	0+1	0	0	0	0	0
	DF	(Scotland) SCO	Stewart Forsyth	15	0	10+3	0	2	0	0	0
	GK	(Scotland) SCO	Bobby Geddes	21	0	16	0	5	0	0	0
	DF	(Scotland) SCO	Bobby Glennie	37	0	28+1	0	5	0	3	0
	FW	(Scotland) SCO	Colin Harris	17	1	13+2	1	0	0	1+1	0
	FW	(Scotland) SCO	Graham Harvey	10	2	7	2	3	0	0	0
	FW	(Scotland) SCO	Colin Hendry	4	0	3+1	0	0	0	0	0
	FW	(Scotland) SCO	Albert Kidd	29	3	11+12	3	1+2	0	2+1	0
	FW	(Scotland) SCO	Walker McCall	30	2	14+10	1	0+3	0	3	1
	DF	(Scotland) SCO	John McCormack	42	7	34	7	5	0	3	0
	DF	(Scotland) SCO	George McGeachie	43	1	35	1	5	0	3	0
	FW	(Scotland) SCO	Colin McGlashan	12	1	2+6	1	0+2	0	0+2	0
	DF	(Scotland) SCO	Tosh McKinlay	41	3	33+1	3	4	0	3	0
	MF	(Scotland) SCO	Derek McWilliams	18	3	7+8	2	1	1	1+1	0
	MF	(Scotland) SCO	Stuart Rafferty	44	4	35+1	4	4+1	0	3	0
	MF	(Scotland) SCO	Lex Richardson	26	1	7+15	1	1+2	0	0+1	0
	DF	(Scotland) SCO	Rab Shannon	3	0	2+1	0	0	0	0	0
	MF	(Scotland) SCO	Jim Smith	27	1	19+4	1	4	0	0	0
	FW	(Scotland) SCO	Ray Stephen	43	10	34+1	8	5	1	3	1
	DF	(England) ENG	John Waddell	2	0	0+2	0	0	0	0	0

== See also ==
- List of Dundee F.C. seasons
