= 1984–85 Heart of Midlothian F.C. season =

Heart of Midlothian
1984–85 season
- Chairman: Wallace Mercer
- Manager: Alex MacDonald
- Stadium: Tynecastle Stadium
- Scottish Premier Division: 7th
- Uefa Cup: Round 1
- Scottish Cup: Quarter-final
- League Cup: Semi-final
- Top goalscorer: League: John Robertson (8); All: John Robertson (13)
- Average home league attendance: 11,305

The 1984–85 season was Heart of Midlothian F.C.'s second consecutive season of play in the Scottish Premier Division. Hearts also competed in the Uefa Cup, Scottish Cup and the League Cup.

== Fixtures ==
=== Friendlies ===
28 July 1984 Friendly	Ross County	2–2	Hearts
	O'Brien 77'; Jappy 81'		Gary Mackay 32' 75'	Attendance: 1,300

30 July 1984 Friendly	Wick Academy	1–7	Hearts
	Goal		Derek O'Connor; Donald Park; Kenny Black (pen.); Brian Whittaker; Alex MacDonald	Attendance: 2,200

1 August 1984 Friendly	Clachnacuddin	2–5	Hearts
	Goal		Jimmy Bone; John Robertson; Gary Mackay; Kenny Black; Roddie MacDonald	Attendance: 1,100

4 August 1984 Friendly	Elgin City	0–2	Hearts
			Craig Levein 75'; Kenny Black 82' (pen.)	Attendance: 1,000

7 August 1984 Friendly	Hearts	3–2	Queens Park Rangers
	Roddie MacDonald 10'; John Robertson 11'; Martin Allen 42' (og.)		John Gregory 68'; Gary Micklewhite 69'	Attendance: 5,068

24 April 1985 Friendly	Hearts	3–1	Eintracht Frankfurt
	Sandy Clark 15'; Brian McNaughton 74'; John Robertson 80'		Armin Kraaz 42'	Attendance: 5,009

=== Uefa Cup ===
19 September 1984 UEFA Cup R1	Paris Saint-Germain	4–0	Hearts	Parc des Princes
	Safet Sušić 22' 55'; Dominique Rocheteau 38'; Richard Niederbacher 73'			Attendance: 21,639

3 October 1984 UEFA Cup R1	Hearts	2–2	Paris Saint-Germain	Tynecastle Stadium
	John Robertson 27' 86'		Richard Niederbacher 10'; Philippe Jeannol 44'	Attendance: 10,023

=== League Cup ===
22 August 1984 League Cup R2	Hearts	4–0	East Stirlingshire	Tynecastle Stadium
	Jimmy Bone 15'; Craig Levein 18'; Willie Johnston 73'; Brian Whittaker 86'			Attendance: 3,755

29 August 1984 League Cup R3	Hearts	1–0	Ayr United	Tynecastle Stadium
	Derek O'Connor 36'			Attendance: 5,377

4 September 1984 League Cup QF	Dundee	0–1	Hearts	Dens Park
			Roddie MacDonald 40'	Attendance: 5,377

26 September 1984 League Cup SF 1st Leg	Hearts	1–2	Dundee United	Tynecastle Stadium
	John Robertson 1'		John Clark 50'; John Clark 54'	Attendance: 10,541

10 October 1984 League Cup SF 2nd Leg	Dundee United	3–1	Hearts	Tannadice
	Eamonn Bannon 30'; David Dodds 56'; Billy Kirkwood 57'		Donald Park 81'	Attendance: 13,468

=== Scottish Cup ===
30 January 1985 Scottish Cup R3	Hearts	6–0	Inverness	Tynecastle Stadium
	Roddie MacDonald 30'; Gary Mackay 41'; Gary Mackay 61'; Gary Mackay 70'; Gary Mackay 79'; John Robertson 72'			Attendance: 7,075

16 February 1985 Scottish Cup R4	Brechin City	1–1	Hearts	Glebe Park
	Torrance 70'		John Robertson 75'	Attendance: 6,250

20 February 1985 Scottish Cup R4 Replay	Hearts	1–0	Brechin City	Tynecastle Stadium
	Brian McNaughton 65'			Attendance: 8,942

9 March 1985 Scottish Cup QF	Hearts	1–1	Aberdeen	Tynecastle Stadium
	Sandy Clark 51'		Eric Black 78'	Attendance: 23,896

13 March 1985 Scottish Cup QF Replay	Aberdeen	1– 0	Hearts	Pittodrie Stadium
	Billy Stark 25'			Attendance: 23,490

=== Scottish Premier Division ===
11 August 1984 Scottish Premier Division	Dundee United	2–0	Hearts	Tannadice
	Ralph Milne 15'; Ralph Milne 78'			Attendance: 10,027

18 August 1984 Scottish Premier Division	Hearts	1–2	Morton	Tynecastle Stadium
	Brian Whittaker 52'		O'Hara 10'; Doug Robertson 63'	Attendance: 6,685

25 August 1984 Scottish Premier Division	Hibs	1–2	Hearts	Easter Road
	Paul Kane 44'		Craig Levein 52'; Derek O'Connor 90'	Attendance: 16,724

1 September 1984 Scottish Premier Division	Hearts	1–0	Dumbarton	Tynecastle Stadium
	Donald Park 39'			Attendance: 6,914

8 September 1984 Scottish Premier Division	Hearts	1–2	St Mirren	Tynecastle Stadium
	John Robertson 50'		Brian Gallacher 70'; Frank McAvennie 80'	Attendance: 7,669

15 September 1984 Scottish Premier Division	Celtic	1–0	Hearts	Celtic Park
	Frank McGarvey 58'			Attendance: 18,411

22 September 1984 Scottish Premier Division	Hearts	0–2	Dundee	Tynecastle Stadium
			John Brown 33'; Tosh McKinlay 66'	Attendance: 7,511

29 September 1984 Scottish Premier Division	Aberdeen	4–0	Hearts	Pittodrie Stadium
	McDougall 46'; Willie Falconer 47'; Ian Angus 75'; McDougall 84'			Attendance: 16,583

6 October 1984 Scottish Premier Division	Hearts	1–0	Rangers	Tynecastle Stadium
	John Robertson 67'			Attendance: 18,097

13 October 1984 Scottish Premier Division	Hearts	2–0	Dundee United	Tynecastle Stadium
	Donald Park 26'; John Robertson 30'			Attendance: 7,066

20 October 1984 Scottish Premier Division	Morton	2–3	Hearts	Cappielow
	James Gillespie 29'; James Holmes 56'		Kenny Black 47' (pen.); John Robertson 63'; Sandy Clark 74'	Attendance: 3,519

27 October 1984 Scottish Premier Division	Hearts	0–0	Hibs	Tynecastle Stadium
				Attendance: 20,156

3 November 1984 Scottish Premier Division	Dumbarton	0–1	Hearts	Boghead Park
			Jimmy Bone 85'	Attendance: 2,706

10 November 1984 Scottish Premier Division	St Mirren	2–3	Hearts	Love Street
	Kenneth McDowall 63'; Ian Scanlon 83'		Sandy Clark 15'; Sandy Clark 61'; Jimmy Bone 71'	Attendance: 5,514

17 November 1984 Scottish Premier Division	Hearts	1–5	Celtic	Tynecastle Stadium
	Willie Johnston 89'		Maurice Johnston 34'; Brian McClair 48'; Brian McClair 49'; Thomas Burns 60'; Brian McClair 83'	Attendance: 20,117

24 November 1984 Scottish Premier Division	Dundee	2–1	Hearts	Dens Park
	Richardson 8'; Robert Connor 67'		Dave Bowman 89'	Attendance: 6,414

1 December 1984 Scottish Premier Division	Hearts	1–2	Aberdeen	Tynecastle Stadium
	Alex MacDonald 42'		Steven Cowan 30'; William Stark 51'	Attendance: 10,037

8 December 1984 Scottish Premier Division	Rangers	1–1	Hearts	Ibrox Stadium
	David Mitchell 21'		Donald Park 64'	Attendance: 16,594

15 December 1984 Scottish Premier Division	Dundee United	5–2	Hearts	Tannadice Park
	Paul Hegarty 7'; Eamonn Bannon 19' (pen.); Stuart Beedie 45'; Alexander Taylor 48'; Berry 58' (og.)		Kenny Black 37' (pen.); Jimmy Bone 89'	Attendance: 7,359

29 December 1984 Scottish Premier Division	Hearts	1–0	Morton	Tynecastle Stadium
	Kenny Black 80'			Attendance: 7,226

1 January 1985 Scottish Premier Division	Hibs	1–2	Hearts	Easter Road
	Jamieson		Gary Mackay 36'; Sandy Clark 62'	Attendance: 18,925

5 January 1985 Scottish Premier Division	Hearts	5–1	Dumbarton	Tynecastle Stadium
	Kenny Black (pen.); Sandy Clark; Jimmy Bone; Kenny Black; Kenny Black		McNeil	Attendance: 7,571

12 January 1985 Scottish Premier Division	Hearts	0–1	St Mirren	Tynecastle Stadium
			Gardner Speirs	Attendance: 11,105

3 February 1985 Scottish Premier Division	Hearts	3–3	Dundee	Tynecastle Stadium
	John Robertson 7'; Gary Mackay 19'; Brian McNaughton 75'		John Brown 16'; John McCormack 20'; Graham Harvey 58'	Attendance: 10,063

9 February 1985 Scottish Premier Division	Aberdeen	2–2	Hearts	Pittodrie Stadium
	Neil Simpson 21'; Peter Weir 34'		Andy Watson 64'; John Robertson 71'	Attendance: 14,759

23 February 1985 Scottish Premier Division	Hearts	2–0	Rangers	Tynecastle Stadium
	Andy Watson 7'; Roddie MacDonald 80'			Attendance: 14,003

2 March 1985 Scottish Premier Division	Morton	0–1	Hearts	Cappielow
			Alex MacDonald 89'	Attendance: 2,800

16 March 1985 Scottish Premier Division	Hearts	0–1	Dundee United	Tynecastle Stadium
			Maurice Malpas 74'	Attendance: 7,663

20 March 1985 Scottish Premier Division	Celtic	3–2	Hearts	Celtic Park
	Maurice Johnston 38'; Murdo MacLeod 78'; Brian McClair 92'		John Robertson 4'; Andy Watson 30'	Attendance: 11,522

23 March 1985 Scottish Premier Division	Dumbarton	1–3	Hearts	Boghead Park
	John Bourke 78'		Walter Kidd 24'; Sandy Clark 39'; Sandy Clark 83'	Attendance: 2,207

2 April 1985 Scottish Premier Division	Hearts	2–2	Hibs	Tynecastle Stadium
	John Robertson 1'; Sandy Clark 20'		Joseph McBride 84'; Joseph McBride 87'	Attendance: 17,814

6 April 1985 Scottish Premier Division	Hearts	0–2	Celtic	Tynecastle Stadium
			Paul McStay 10'; Brian McClair 66'	Attendance: 14,883

20 April 1985 Scottish Premier Division	Dundee	3–0	Hearts	Dens Park
	John McCormack 23'; John Brown 35'; Tosh McKinlay 85'			Attendance: 7,381

27 April 1985 Scottish Premier Division	Rangers	3–1	Hearts	Ibrox Stadium
	Alistair McCoist 11'; Robert Prytz 34' (pen.); Davie Cooper 87'		Brian McNaughton 62'	Attendance: 12,193

4 May 1985 Scottish Premier Division	Hearts	0–3	Aberdeen	Tynecastle Stadium
			McDougall; McDougall; McDougall	Attendance: 8,251

11 May 1985 Scottish Premier Division	St Mirren	5–2	Hearts	Love Street
	Brian Gallacher 9'; Brian Gallacher 39'; Gardner Speirs 59'; Peter Mackie; Frank McAvennie		Kenny Black 7'; Stephen Clarke 77' (og.)	Attendance: 4,817

== Scottish Premier Division table ==
Pos	Team	Pld	W	D	L	GF	GA	GD	Pts	Qualification or relegation
5	St Mirren	36	17	4	15	51	56	−5	38	Qualification for the UEFA Cup first round
6	Dundee	36	15	7	14	48	50	−2	37	
7	Heart of Midlothian	36	13	5	18	47	64	−17	31	
8	Hibernian	36	10	7	19	38	61	−23	27	
9	Dumbarton (R)	36	6	7	23	29	64	−35	19	Relegation to the 1985–86 Scottish First Division

Source: Statto
Rules for classification: 1) points; 2) goal difference; 3) number of goals scored.
(R) Relegated

== Squad information ==
No.	Pos	Nat	Player	Total		Scottish Premier Division		Scottish Cup		Scottish League Cup		Uefa Cup	
No.	Pos	Nat	Player	Apps	Goals	Apps	Goals	Apps	Goals	Apps	Goals	Apps	Goals
	GK	(Scotland) SCO	Henry Smith	48	0	36	0	5	0	5	0	2	0
	DF	(Scotland) SCO	Craig Levein	47	2	36	1	4	0	5	1	2	0
	DF	(Scotland) SCO	Stewart MacLaren	1	0	1	0	0	0	0	0	0	0
	DF	(Scotland) SCO	Walter Kidd	44	1	33	1	4	0	5	0	2	0
	DF	(Scotland) SCO	Malcolm Murray	4	0	4	0	0	0	0	0	0	0
	DF	(Scotland) SCO	George Cowie	21	0	15	0	0	0	5	0	1	0
	DF	(Scotland) SCO	Jimmy Sandison	3	0	3	0	0	0	0	0	0	0
	DF	(Scotland) SCO	Brian Whittaker	39	2	29	1	5	0	3	1	2	0
	MF	(Scotland) SCO	Roddie MacDonald	38	3	28	1	5	1	5	1	0	0
	MF	(Scotland) SCO	Sandy Clark	30	9	25	8	5	1	0	0	0	0
	MF	(Scotland) SCO	Alex MacDonald	29	2	21	2	1	0	5	0	2	0
	MF	(Scotland) SCO	Donald Park	27	4	21	3	0	0	5	1	1	0
	MF	(Scotland) SCO	Gary Mackay	23	6	17	2	5	4	0	0	1	0
	MF	(Scotland) SCO	Andy Watson	21	3	16	3	5	0	0	0	0	0
	MF	(Scotland) SCO	Willie Johnston	19	2	10	1	2	0	5	1	2	0
	MF	(Scotland) SCO	Dave Bowman	17	1	11	1	0	0	4	0	2	0
	MF	(Scotland) SCO	Neil Berry	6	0	3	0	3	0	0	0	0	0
	MF	(Scotland) SCO	Sandy Jardine	45	0	34	0	5	0	5	0	1	0
	MF	(Scotland) SCO	Kenny Black	41	7	32	7	5	0	2	0	2	0
	MF	(England) ENG	Paul Cherry	3	0	3	0	0	0	0	0	0	0
	MF	(Scotland) SCO	Jim Cowell	1	0	1	0	0	0	0	0	0	0
	FW	(Scotland) SCO	John Robertson	45	13	33	8	5	2	5	1	2	2
	FW	(Scotland) SCO	Brian McNaughton	11	3	8	2	3	1	0	0	0	0
	FW	(Scotland) SCO	Derek O'Connor	7	2	4	1	0	0	2	1	1	0
	FW	(Scotland) SCO	Jimmy Bone	28	5	21	4	0	0	5	1	2	0

== See also ==
- List of Heart of Midlothian F.C. seasons
