= 1989–90 Dundee F.C. season =

Dundee
1989–90 season
- Manager: Gordon Wallace
- Premier Division: 10th (relegated)
- Scottish Cup: 3rd round
- League Cup: 3rd round
- Top goalscorer: League: Billy Dodds (13); All: Billy Dodds (13)
Home colours

The 1989–90 season was the 88th season in which Dundee competed at a Scottish national level, playing in the Scottish Premier Division. Dundee would finish in 10th place and would be relegated to the Scottish First Division. Dundee would also compete in both the Scottish League Cup and the Scottish Cup, where they were knocked out by Dunfermline Athletic in the 3rd round of the League Cup, and by inter-city rivals Dundee United in the 3rd round of the Scottish Cup.

== Scottish Premier Division ==
Statistics provided by Dee Archive.

Match day	Date	Opponent	H/A	Score	Dundee scorer(s)	Attendance
1	12 August	Dunfermline Athletic	A	1–2	Beedie	8,987
2	19 August	Dundee United	H	4–3	Wright (3), McBride	13,616
3	26 August	Aberdeen	A	0–1		12,500
4	9 September	Heart of Midlothian	H	2–2	Wright, Harvey	8,440
5	16 September	Rangers	A	2–2	Craig, Wright	35,836
6	23 September	Hibernian	H	0–0		6,876
7	30 September	Motherwell	A	0–3		4,463
8	4 October	St Mirren	A	2–3	Wright, Dodds	3,587
9	14 October	Celtic	H	1–3	Craib	16,215
10	21 October	Dunfermline Athletic	H	1–2	Dodds (pen.)	7,058
11	28 October	Dundee United	A	0–0		11,529
12	4 November	Aberdeen	H	1–1	Dodds	7,041
13	11 November	Heart of Midlothian	A	3–6	Saunders, Dodds (2)	11,869
14	18 November	Rangers	H	0–2		14,536
15	25 November	Hibernian	A	2–3	Beedie, Dodds	5,644
16	2 December	Motherwell	H	2–1	Dodds (pen.), Craig	4,099
17	9 December	St Mirren	H	3–3	Dodds (pen.), Chisholm, Forsyth	4,043
18	16 December	Celtic	A	1–4	Beedie	17,860
19	26 December	Dunfermline Athletic	A	0–1		9,282
20	30 December	Dundee United	H	1–1	Chisholm	12,803
21	2 January	Aberdeen	A	2–5	Wright, D. Campbell	16,054
22	6 January	Heart of Midlothian	H	0–1		8,300
23	13 January	Rangers	A	0–3		36,993
24	27 January	Hibernian	H	2–0	Wright, Chisholm	5,723
25	3 February	Celtic	H	0–0		14,100
26	10 February	St Mirren	A	0–0		5,010
27	17 February	Motherwell	A	1–3	Dodds	5,508
28	3 March	Rangers	H	2–2	A. Campbell, Dodds	12,743
29	10 March	Dunfermline Athletic	H	1–0	Dodds	7,243
30	24 March	Dundee United	A	2–1	Wright, Shannon	11,918
31	31 March	Aberdeen	H	1–1	Wright	8,071
32	4 April	Heart of Midlothian	A	0–0		10,761
33	14 April	St Mirren	H	1–2	A. Campbell	7,415
34	21 April	Celtic	A	1–1	Dodds (pen.)	15,115
35	28 April	Hibernian	A	1–1	Dodds	4,665
36	5 May	Motherwell	H	1–2	Wright	2,846

=== League table ===
Pos	Team	Pld	W	D	L	GF	GA	GD	Pts	Qualification or relegation
6	Motherwell	36	11	12	13	43	47	−4	34	
7	Hibernian	36	12	10	14	34	41	−7	34	
8	Dunfermline Athletic	36	11	8	17	37	50	−13	30	
9	St Mirren	36	10	10	16	28	48	−20	30	
10	Dundee (R)	36	5	14	17	41	65	−24	24	Relegation to the 1990–91 Scottish First Division

Source: RSSSF
Rules for classification: 1) points; 2) goal difference; 3) number of goals scored.
(R) Relegated

== Scottish League Cup ==
Statistics provided by Dee Archive.

Match day	Date	Opponent	H/A	Score	Dundee scorer(s)	Attendance
2nd round	15 August	Clyde	H	5–1	McBride (2), Wright, Harvey (2)	3,033
3rd round	23 August	Dunfermline Athletic	A	0–1		8,076

== Scottish Cup ==
Statistics provided by Dee Archive.

Match day	Date	Opponent	H/A	Score	Dundee scorer(s)	Attendance
3rd round	20 January	Dundee United	H	0–0		14,276
3R replay	23 January	Dundee United	A	0–1		16,228

== Player statistics ==
No.	Pos	Nat	Player	Total		First Division		Scottish Cup		League Cup	
No.	Pos	Nat	Player	Apps	Goals	Apps	Goals	Apps	Goals	Apps	Goals
	DF	(Scotland) SCO	Arthur Albiston	12	0	9+1	0	0	0	2	0
	MF	(Scotland) SCO	Ian Angus	4	0	4	0	0	0	0	0
	DF	(Scotland) SCO	Kevin Bain	1	0	0+1	0	0	0	0	0
	MF	(Scotland) SCO	Stuart Beedie	23	3	19+2	3	0	0	2	0
	FW	(Republic of Ireland) IRL	Alan Campbell	17	2	8+7	2	0	0	0+2	0
	FW	(Scotland) SCO	Duncan Campbell	15	1	6+9	1	0	0	0	0
	DF	(Scotland) SCO	Stevie Campbell	2	0	0+2	0	0	0	0	0
	GK	(Scotland) SCO	Tam Carson	18	0	16	0	2	0	0	0
	DF	(Scotland) SCO	Gordon Chisholm	38	3	34	3	2	0	2	0
	DF	(Scotland) SCO	Mark Craib	26	1	20+2	1	2	0	1+1	0
	MF	(Scotland) SCO	Albert Craig	24	2	12+8	2	2	0	2	0
	DF	(Scotland) SCO	Alan Dinnie	24	0	21+1	0	2	0	0	0
	FW	(Scotland) SCO	Billy Dodds	32	13	29+1	13	2	0	0	0
	DF	(Scotland) SCO	Jim Duffy	8	0	8	0	0	0	0	0
	MF	(Scotland) SCO	Derek Ferguson	4	0	4	0	0	0	0	0
	DF	(Scotland) SCO	Stewart Forsyth	38	1	33+1	1	2	0	2	0
	DF	(Scotland) SCO	Stephen Frail	8	0	6	0	0+1	0	1	0
	GK	(Scotland) SCO	Bobby Geddes	14	0	12	0	0	0	2	0
	FW	(Scotland) SCO	Graham Harvey	8	3	4+2	1	0	0	2	2
	DF	(Scotland) SCO	John Holt	2	0	2	0	0	0	0	0
	DF	(England) ENG	Willie Jamieson	14	0	14	0	0	0	0	0
	MF	(Scotland) SCO	Michael Kerr	2	0	0+2	0	0	0	0	0
	GK	(Scotland) SCO	Paul Mathers	8	0	8	0	0	0	0	0
	MF	(Scotland) SCO	Joe McBride	20	3	10+7	1	0+1	0	2	2
	DF	(Scotland) SCO	George McGeachie	2	0	2	0	0	0	0	0
	MF	(Scotland) SCO	Gordon McLeod	29	0	24+3	0	2	0	0	0
	MF	(Scotland) SCO	Grant McMartin	4	0	3+1	0	0	0	0	0
	DF	(Scotland) SCO	John McQuillan	1	0	1	0	0	0	0	0
	MF	(Scotland) SCO	Shaun McSkimming	9	0	6+1	0	2	0	0	0
	DF	(England) ENG	Wes Saunders	9	1	7+2	1	0	0	0	0
	DF	(Scotland) SCO	Rab Shannon	40	1	36	1	2	0	2	0
	MF	(Scotland) SCO	Jim Smith	4	0	4	0	0	0	0	0
	FW	(Scotland) SCO	Keith Wright	38	12	34	11	2	0	2	1

- Source: Dee Archive

== See also ==
- List of Dundee F.C. seasons
