= 1991–92 Dundee F.C. season =

Dundee
1991–92 season
- Manager: Gordon Wallace (until Oct. 1991) John Blackley (caretaker, Oct. 1991); Iain Munro (Oct. 1991–Feb. 1992) Simon Stainrod (caretaker, from. Feb. 1992)
- First Division: 1st (champions)
- Scottish Cup: 4th round
- League Cup: 2nd round
- Challenge Cup: 1st round
- Top goalscorer: League: Billy Dodds (19); All: Billy Dodds (19)
Home colours

The 1991–92 season was the 90th season in which Dundee competed at a Scottish national level, playing in the Scottish First Division for the second consecutive season. Dundee would finish at the top of the table as champions, and would be promoted back to the Premier Division. Dundee would also compete in both the Scottish League Cup and the Scottish Cup, where they were knocked out by Ayr United in the 2nd round of the League Cup, and by Falkirk in a 4th round replay of the Scottish Cup. Dundee would also compete in the Scottish Challenge Cup, and would be knocked out by Ayr United in the 1st round.

== Scottish First Division ==
Statistics provided by Dee Archive.

Match day	Date	Opponent	H/A	Score	Dundee scorer(s)	Attendance
1	10 August	Clydebank	A	2–1	Craig, D. Campbell	1,527
2	13 August	Forfar Athletic	A	4–2	McQuillan, Craig, Dodds (2)	2,458
3	17 August	Meadowbank Thistle	H	3–1	Dodds (2), Craig	2,860
4	24 August	Hamilton Academical	H	4–1	Jamieson, Bremner, Craig, Dodds	2,751
5	31 August	Raith Rovers	A	1–0	Craig	3,122
6	7 September	Greenock Morton	A	0–3		2,036
7	14 September	Ayr United	H	3–1	West (2), Dodds	3,410
8	21 September	Kilmarnock	H	2–1	S. Campbell (pen.), Jamieson	3,788
9	28 September	Montrose	A	2–1	Jamieson, S. Campbell (pen.)	2,147
10	5 October	Partick Thistle	H	1–2	Beedie	4,804
11	8 October	Stirling Albion	A	1–1	McMartin	1,450
12	12 October	Clyde	H	4–0	Chisholm, Dodds, Bremner, D. Campbell (pen.)	2,335
13	19 October	Meadowbank Thistle	A	2–1	Bremner, Dodds	729
14	26 October	Greenock Morton	H	0–1		1,925
15	29 October	Ayr United	A	1–4	Dodds	2,414
16	2 November	Raith Rovers	H	1–1	Dodds	2,397
17	9 November	Hamilton Academical	A	3–1	Gallagher (2), Dodds	1,886
18	16 November	Partick Thistle	A	6–2	Gallagher (3), Bremner (2), McQuillan	5,441
19	19 November	Stirling Albion	H	0–0		2,733
20	23 November	Kilmarnock	A	2–1	Chisholm, McCall	7,128
21	30 November	Forfar Athletic	H	4–0	McCall, Gallagher (2), Jamieson	2,976
22	3 December	Montrose	H	1–0	Beedie	2,799
23	7 December	Clydebank	A	2–2	Bremner, S. Campbell	1,425
24	14 December	Greenock Morton	A	0–0		1,567
25	28 December	Hamilton Academical	H	1–2	Gallagher	4,595
26	1 January	Raith Rovers	A	0–1		3,976
27	4 January	Partick Thistle	H	1–0	Chisholm	4,547
28	7 January	Ayr United	H	1–1	McCall	2,505
29	11 January	Stirling Albion	A	1–1	Craig	2,500
30	18 January	Forfar Athletic	A	3–0	Beedie, Craig, West	2,212
31	1 February	Meadowbank Thistle	H	2–1	Dodds (2) (pen.)	3,218
32	8 February	Kilmarnock	H	1–1	Gallagher	5,988
33	22 February	Montrose	A	3–2	Chisholm, Beedie, McCall	2,361
34	29 February	Partick Thistle	A	0–2		8,437
35	7 March	Stirling Albion	H	5–0	Dodds, McCall (2), Stainrod, Gallagher	3,202
36	14 March	Hamilton Academical	A	1–1	Dodds	2,830
37	21 March	Raith Rovers	H	3–2	McCall (2), Dodds	4,458
38	28 March	Clydebank	H	3–0	Chisholm, Stainrod, Dodds	3,580
39	4 April	Meadowbank Thistle	A	0–0		1,222
40	7 April	Greenock Morton	H	2–2	Dodds (2) (pen.)	4,011
41	11 April	Ayr United	A	0–0		2,418
42	18 April	Kilmarnock	A	0–2		4,933
43	25 April	Forfar Athletic	H	3–1	McQuillan, Ritchie, Gallagher	5,144
44	2 May	Montrose	H	1–2	Gallagher	6,878

=== League table ===
Pos	Team	Pld	W	D	L	GF	GA	GD	Pts	Promotion or relegation
1	Dundee (C, P)	44	23	12	9	80	48	+32	58	Promotion to the Premier Division
2	Partick Thistle (P)	44	23	11	10	62	36	+26	57	Promotion to the Premier Division
3	Hamilton Academical	44	22	13	9	72	48	+24	57	
4	Kilmarnock	44	21	12	11	59	37	+22	54	
5	Raith Rovers	44	21	11	12	59	42	+17	53	

Source: RSSSF and statto
Rules for classification: 1) points; 2) goal difference; 3) number of goals scored.
(C) Champions; (P) Promoted

== Scottish League Cup ==
Statistics provided by Dee Archive.

Match day	Date	Opponent	H/A	Score	Dundee scorer(s)	Attendance
2nd round	21 August	Ayr United	H	2–4 (A.E.T.)	Craig (2)	3,084

== Scottish Cup ==
Statistics provided by Dee Archive.

Match day	Date	Opponent	H/A	Score	Dundee scorer(s)	Attendance
3rd round	3 February	Stirling Albion	H	1–1	Dinnie	3,851
3R replay	5 February	Stirling Albion	N	1–0	McMartin	3,418
4th round	15 February	Falkirk	A	0–0		7,517
4R replay	24 February	Falkirk	H	0–1		7,722

== Scottish Challenge Cup ==
Statistics provided by Dee Archive.

Match day	Date	Opponent	H/A	Score	Dundee scorer(s)	Attendance
1st round	1 October	Ayr United	H	0–2		2,058

== Player statistics ==
Statistics provided by Dee Archive

No.	Pos	Nat	Player	Total		First Division		Scottish Cup		League Cup		Challenge Cup	
No.	Pos	Nat	Player	Apps	Goals	Apps	Goals	Apps	Goals	Apps	Goals	Apps	Goals
	MF	(Scotland) SCO	Stuart Beedie	43	4	40	4	2	0	1	0	0	0
	FW	(Scotland) SCO	Kevin Bremner	26	6	15+9	6	0+1	0	1	0	0	0
	FW	(Scotland) SCO	Duncan Campbell	15	2	11+2	2	0	0	1	0	1	0
	DF	(Scotland) SCO	Stevie Campbell	32	3	29+1	3	0	0	1	0	1	0
	GK	(Scotland) SCO	Tam Carson	1	0	0	0	0	0	0	0	1	0
	DF	(Scotland) SCO	Gordon Chisholm	45	5	37+2	5	4	0	0+1	0	1	0
	MF	(Scotland) SCO	Max Christie	1	0	1	0	0	0	0	0	0	0
	DF	(Scotland) SCO	Mark Craib	22	0	20	0	0	0	1	0	1	0
	MF	(Scotland) SCO	Albert Craig	31	9	24+1	7	2+2	0	1	2	1	0
	DF	(Scotland) SCO	Alan Dinnie	35	1	24+6	0	4	1	0	0	1	0
	FW	(Scotland) SCO	Billy Dodds	47	19	41	19	4	0	1	0	1	0
	DF	(Scotland) SCO	Andy Dow	5	0	0+5	0	0	0	0	0	0	0
	DF	(Scotland) SCO	Graeme Forbes	3	0	3	0	0	0	0	0	0	0
	DF	(Scotland) SCO	Stewart Forsyth	19	0	11+4	0	4	0	0	0	0	0
	DF	(Scotland) SCO	Stephen Frail	4	0	2+1	0	1	0	0	0	0	0
	MF	(Scotland) SCO	Cammy Fraser	15	0	12	0	1	0	1	0	1	0
	FW	(Scotland) SCO	Eddie Gallagher	27	12	14+9	12	4	0	0	0	0	0
	DF	(England) ENG	Willie Jamieson	41	4	38	4	2	0	1	0	0	0
	GK	(Scotland) SCO	Jim Leighton	15	0	13	0	2	0	0	0	0	0
	GK	(Scotland) SCO	Paul Mathers	34	0	31	0	2	0	1	0	0	0
	MF	(Scotland) SCO	Ian McCall	32	8	27+1	8	4	0	0	0	0	0
	MF	(Scotland) SCO	Gordon McLeod	17	0	11+3	0	1+1	0	0	0	0+1	0
	MF	(Scotland) SCO	Grant McMartin	30	2	17+7	1	3+1	1	0+1	0	1	0
	DF	(Scotland) SCO	John McQuillan	46	3	39+1	3	4	0	1	0	1	0
	FW	(Scotland) SCO	Paul Ritchie	7	1	4+3	1	0	0	0	0	0	0
	DF	(Scotland) SCO	Rab Shannon	3	0	3	0	0	0	0	0	0	0
	FW	(England) ENG	Simon Stainrod	12	2	10+2	2	0	0	0	0	0	0
	MF	(England) ENG	Colin West	10	3	7+2	3	0+1	0	0	0	0	0

== See also ==
- List of Dundee F.C. seasons
