= Doug Robertson =

Doug Robertson may refer to:

- Dougie Robertson (born 1963), Scottish footballer for Greenock Morton
- Doug Robertson (footballer) (fl. 1959–1966), Scottish footballer for Dumbarton
