= Steve McIlhone =

Scottish footballer (born 1998)

Personal information
- Date of birth: 24 May 1969 (age 57)
- Place of birth: Edinburgh, Scotland
- Position: Forward

Youth career
- Hibernian

Senior career*
Years	Team	Apps	(Gls)
1986–1987	Hibernian	0	(0)
- Blackburn United
1987–1989	East Fife	13	(0)
- Whitburn

Managerial career
- 2008–2012: Broxburn Athletic (assistant)
- * Club domestic league appearances and goals

Steve McIlhone (born 24 May 1969) is a Scottish former professional footballer who played as a forward for Hibernian and East Fife.

== Club career ==
=== Hibernian ===
McIlhone started his career at Hibernian in 1986, sharing a dressing room with Hibernian legend Paul Kane. The forward caught the eye of clubs in England and had trained with Arsenal for a week, but left the Hibees without making a single first team appearance.

=== East Fife ===
He had a short spell at the West Lothian club Blackburn United before joining East Fife. McIlhone made 13 appearances without scoring for the Fifers and was released by then manager Gavin Murray in 1989.

=== Whitburn ===
After leaving Fife, McIlhone joined Whitburn for the remainder of his playing career. He was part of the squad that reached the Scottish Junior Cup final in 1995, but ultimately lost 2–0 to Camelon Juniors.

== Coaching career ==
McIlhone was appointed as Steve Pittman's assistant manager at Broxburn Athletic in 2008. He was part of the Brox team that won the Scottish Junior Football East Region Premier League South in 2009–2010. McIlhone stepped down from the position of assistant manager in 2012 due to work commitments.

He rejoined the Broxburn Athletic coaching staff when Pittman returned as manager in 2023.
