= Steve Pittman =

American soccer player

Personal information
- Full name: Stephen Lee Pittman
- Date of birth: July 18, 1967 (age 59)
- Place of birth: Wilson, North Carolina, USA
- Height: 5 ft 10 in (1.78 m)
- Position: Defender

Youth career
- –1986: Broxburn Athletic

Senior career*
Years	Team	Apps	(Gls)
1986–1989	East Fife	83	(10)
1989–1990	Shrewsbury Town		
1990–1992	Fort Lauderdale Strikers		(4)
1990–1992	Wichita Wings (indoor)	49	(28)
1992–1994	Dundee	59	(5)
1994–1996	Partick Thistle	72	(4)
1996	Tampa Bay Mutiny	29	(1)
1997	Kansas City Wizards	26	(0)
- Clydebank
2000	Stenhousemuir	8	(0)
2000–2001	Linlithgow Rose		
2001–?	Pumpherston		

International career
1990–1997	United States	3	(0)

Managerial career
- 2004–2009: Pumpherston
- 2009–2015: Broxburn Athletic
- 2017-2020: Livingston FC U20 (joint with Derek McWilliams)
- 2023-2025: Broxburn Athletic
Medal record
Representing United States
Third place	CONCACAF Gold Cup	1996
Men's Soccer
- * Club domestic league appearances and goals

Steve Pittman (July 18, 1967 in Wilson, North Carolina) is an American former soccer defender who spent most of his career in the Scottish leagues. He also played professionally in the United States with Major Indoor Soccer League, American Professional Soccer League and Major League Soccer. He earned three caps with the United States national soccer team and most recently managed Broxburn Athletic.

== Player ==
=== Early life ===
He played for East Calder C.F.C. as a child before turning professional.

=== Professional ===
While born in the United States, Pittman moved with his mother to Scotland after his parents divorced when he was two years old. He is a Scottish-American dual-citizen. He played for Broxburn Athletic as a youth player. In 1986, he began his professional career with East Fife F.C. before moving to Shrewsbury Town F.C. on March 3, 1989. In October 1987, Pittman had an unsuccessful trial with the Cleveland Force of Major Indoor Soccer League. On March 29, 1990, Pittman signed with the Fort Lauderdale Strikers of the American Professional Soccer League. He was both a first team All Star and the 1990 Rookie of the Year. On August 29, 1990, he signed with the Wichita Wings of the Major Indoor Soccer League. In 1991, he returned to the Strikers. The team released him in August 1991 after an accumulation of yellow and red cards kept him out of seven games during the season. After being ejected in a late season game, Pittman entered the stands to chase a spectator leading to league officials suspending him for the first two games of the playoffs. He then rejoined the Wichita Wings for the upcoming MISL season. Despite being released by the Strikers in August 1991, the team re-signed Pittman at the end of April 1992. When the APSL season ended in August, the Strikers loaned Pittman Dundee F.C. When Pittman's contract with the Strikers ran out, he then signed with Dundee as a free agent. In September 1994, he moved to Partick Thistle F.C. Whilst at Partick Thistle, where Pittman enjoyed arguably the most successful period of his career, he became somewhat of a cult hero after regularly performing his "Marine Drive" free-kick. After lining up a direct free-kick, Pittman would stand on one foot and offer up a military style salute to the Thistle fans, before unleashing a shot towards goal. He only managed to score once in this fashion, in a closed-door friendly match against Berwick Rangers. His career with Partick ended when he accumulated three red cards in quick succession after confronting referees following an end of season match. This led to an eight-game ban. In 1996, he signed with the Tampa Bay Mutiny of Major League Soccer. In July 1996, he scored the winning goal for the East during the 1996 All-Star Game. He also toured China as a guest player for San Jose Clash in 1996. On January 9, 1997, the Mutiny traded Pittman to the Kansas City Wizards in exchange for Alan Prampin and the Wizards' third-round pick in the 1997 MLS Supplemental Draft. The Wizards waived him on November 17, 1997, and he returned to Scotland where he joined Clydebank. At some point he transferred to Stenhousemuir F.C. where he played three games at the start of the 2000–2001 season. In November 2000, he transferred to Linlithgow Rose F.C. He finished his career at Pumpherston F.C.

=== National team ===
He earned his first cap for U.S. national team in a 3–0 victory over Trinidad and Tobago on September 15, 1990. Pittman started the game, then came off in the 65th minute for Troy Dayak. His second game was a 1–0 loss to Sweden on August 16, 1995. He earned his last cap on January 29, 1997, when the U.S. lost to China. Pittman began the game, but came off for Ramiro Corrales in the 60th minute.

== Manager ==
=== Pumpherston ===
Pittman has managed Pumpherston F.C.

=== Broxburn ===
On June 19, 2009, Pittman was named new manager of Scottish Junior Club Broxburn Athletic. Broxburn Athletic secured the league championship in his first season at the helm.

=== Livingston ===
In 2017, Pittman was appointed Co-Manager of Livingston U20 squad along with Derek McWilliams. The pair left the position in 2020.

=== Broxburn return ===
Pitman returned as manager of Broxburn Athletic in January 2023. Derek McWilliams and Billy McPhee was recruited as his coaching staff. That summer Pittman added Steve McIlhone as a coach within the setup.

He left the role in August 2025.

== Personal life ==
Pittman is the father of Livingston player Scott Pittman.

== Honors ==
Individual

- MLS All-Star: 1996
