= Lex Richardson =

Scottish footballer and manager

Personal information
- Date of birth: 16 November 1958 (age 67)
- Place of birth: Glasgow, Scotland
- Position: Midfielder

Youth career
- 19xx–1976: Arthurlie

Senior career*
Years	Team	Apps	(Gls)
1976–1983	St Mirren	220	(18)
1983–1985	Dundee	51	(1)
1985–1987	Greenock Morton	69	(11)
1987–1990	Arbroath	85	(12)
1990–1991	Albion Rovers	30	(3)
Total		455	(45)

International career
1980	Scottish League XI	1	(0)

Managerial career
- 1991: Carnoustie Panmure
- * Club domestic league appearances and goals

Lex Richardson (born 16 November 1958) is a Scottish former professional football player and manager. Richardson was active as a midfielder between 1976 and 1991, making 455 appearances in the Scottish Football League, before becoming a junior manager.

== Career ==
Born in Glasgow, Richardson began his career with Arthurlie, before turning professional in 1976 with St Mirren. He later played for Dundee, Greenock Morton, Arbroath and Albion Rovers, before retiring in 1991 to become manager of Carnoustie Panmure.
