= Bobby Connor =

Scottish footballer (born 1960)

Personal information
- Full name: Robert James Connor
- Date of birth: 4 August 1960 (age 66)
- Place of birth: Kilmarnock, Scotland
- Position: Midfielder

Youth career
- Ayr United

Senior career*
Years	Team	Apps	(Gls)
1977–1984	Ayr United	223	(28)
1984–1986	Dundee	71	(9)
1986–1994	Aberdeen	206	(17)
1994–1996	Kilmarnock	51	(0)
1996–1997	Ayr United	18	(1)
1997	Partick Thistle	2	(0)
1997–1998	Queen of the South	22	(1)
Total		593	(56)

International career
1980–1981	Scotland U21	2	(0)
1986–1990	Scotland	4	(0)
1990	Scottish Football League XI	1	(0)

Managerial career
- 2005–2007: Ayr United
- * Club domestic league appearances and goals

Robert James Connor (born 4 August 1960) is a Scottish former footballer, who played as a midfielder. During his playing career, Connor made nearly 600 appearances in the Scottish Football League, and earned four caps for the Scotland national side between 1986 and 1990. Connor has also been a football manager, managing Ayr United between 2005 and 2007.

== Career ==
=== Club career ===
Born in Kilmarnock, Connor began his professional career with Ayr United in 1977. Connor also played in the Scottish Football League with Dundee, Aberdeen, Kilmarnock, Partick Thistle and finally Queen of the South in the era of Jamie McAllister and Tommy Bryce.

=== International career ===
Connor made his international debut on 29 April 1986, and made a total of four international appearances.

=== Coaching career ===
Connor has also been a football manager, managing Ayr United between 2005 and 2007.

== Career statistics ==
=== Club ===
Appearances and goals by club, season and competition
Club	Seasons	League			Scottish Cup		League Cup		Europe		Total	
Club	Seasons	Division	Apps	Goals	Apps	Goals	Apps	Goals	Apps	Goals	Apps	Goals
Ayr United	1977–78	Scottish Premier Division	9	0	-	-	-	-	-	-	9+	0+
Ayr United	1978–79	Scottish First Division	29	0	-	-	-	-	-	-	29+	0+
Ayr United	1979–80	Scottish First Division	38	9	-	-	-	-	-	-	38+	9+
Ayr United	1980–81	Scottish First Division	39	8	-	-	-	-	-	-	39+	8+
Ayr United	1981–82	Scottish First Division	30	0	-	-	-	-	-	-	30+	0+
Ayr United	1982–83	Scottish First Division	39	4	-	-	-	-	-	-	39+	4+
Ayr United	1983–84	Scottish First Division	39	7	-	-	-	-	-	-	39+	7+
Ayr United	Total		223	28	-	-	-	-	-	-	223+	28+
Dundee	1984–85	Scottish Premier Division	34	7	5	1	2	1	0	0	41	9
Dundee	1985–86	Scottish Premier Division	35	2	4	0	2	0	0	0	41	2
Dundee	1986–87	Scottish Premier Division	2	0	0	0	0	0	0	0	2	0
Dundee	Total		71	9	9	1	4	1	0	0	84	11
Aberdeen	1986–87	Scottish Premier Division	32	4	3	0	3	2	1	0	39	6
Aberdeen	1987–88	Scottish Premier Division	34	1	3	1	3	1	4	0	44	3
Aberdeen	1988–89	Scottish Premier Division	36	4	5	1	5	0	2	0	48	5
Aberdeen	1989–90	Scottish Premier Division	33	1	5	0	5	0	2	0	45	1
Aberdeen	1990–91	Scottish Premier Division	29	6	1	0	4	0	3	0	37	6
Aberdeen	1991–92	Scottish Premier Division	11	0	0	0	0	0	2	0	13	0
Aberdeen	1992–93	Scottish Premier Division	6	0	0	0	0	0	0	0	6	0
Aberdeen	1993–94	Scottish Premier Division	25	1	0	0	2	0	3	0	30	1
Aberdeen	Total		206	17	17	2	22	3	17	0	262	22
Kilmarnock	1994–95	Scottish Premier Division	28	0	3	0	2	0	0	0	33	0
Kilmarnock	1995–96	Scottish Premier Division	23	0	0	0	2	0	0	0	25	0
Kilmarnock	Total		51	0	3	0	4	0	0	0	58	0
Ayr United	1996–97	Scottish Second Division	18	1	-	-	-	-	-	-	18+	1+
Partick Thistle	1997–98	Scottish First Division	2	0	-	-	-	-	-	-	2+	0+
Queen of the South	1997–98	Scottish Second Division	22	1	-	-	-	-	-	-	22+	1+
Career total			593	56	29+	3+	30+	4+	17	0	669+	63+

=== International ===
Appearances and goals by national team and year
National team	Year	Apps	Goals
Scotland	1986	1	0
Scotland	1987	—	
Scotland	1988	1	0
Scotland	1989	1	0
Scotland	1990	1	0
Total		4	0

=== Managerial record ===
Team	From	To	Record				
Team	From	To	P	W	L	D	Win %
Ayr United	2005	2007	92	26	40	26	28.28%
