= Colin Hendry =

Scottish football coach and player (born 1965)

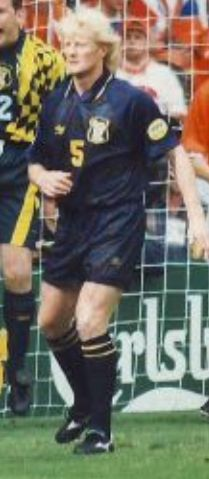
- Hendry playing for Scotland at UEFA Euro 1996

Personal information
- Full name: Edward Colin James Hendry
- Date of birth: 7 December 1965 (age 60)
- Place of birth: Keith, Moray, Scotland
- Height: 6 ft 1 in (1.85 m)
- Position: Defender

Youth career
- 1981–1982: Keith
- 1982–1983: Islavale

Senior career*
Years	Team	Apps	(Gls)
1983–1987	Dundee	41	(2)
1987–1989	Blackburn Rovers	102	(22)
1989–1991	Manchester City	63	(5)
1991–1998	Blackburn Rovers	235	(12)
1998–2000	Rangers	22	(0)
2000–2001	Coventry City	11	(0)
2000–2001	→ Bolton Wanderers (loan)	9	(1)
2001–2003	Bolton Wanderers	16	(2)
2002	→ Preston North End (loan)	2	(0)
2002–2003	Blackpool	14	(0)
Total		515	(44)

International career
1993–2001	Scotland	51	(3)

Managerial career
- 2004–2005: Blackpool
- 2007–2008: Clyde
- * Club domestic league appearances and goals

Edward Colin James Hendry (born 7 December 1965) is a Scottish football coach and former professional player.

Hendry, who played as a defender, played in the Premier League for Blackburn Rovers, with whom he was part of the title-winning side of 1995. He also played top flight football in England and Scotland for Dundee, Manchester City, Rangers, Coventry City and Bolton Wanderers, as well as stints in the Football League with Preston North End and Blackpool. He earned 51 caps for Scotland, scoring three times, and was part of Scotland's Euro 96 and World Cup 98 squads.

After retiring, Hendry took over as Blackpool manager and later had a spell in charge of Clyde. He later returned to Blackburn as part of their coaching staff, having also had a spell as assistant manager of Boston United.

== Playing career ==
=== Club ===
Hendry first played for his local semi-professional club, Highland League outfit Keith, and Islavale, a North Scottish Junior club. He began his full-time professional career in 1983 with Dundee. During his early career, Hendry played mainly as a striker. In 1987 he was transferred to Blackburn Rovers, where he was converted into a defender. One of his first appearances came in the Full Members Cup final, where he scored the only goal in the 1–0 Wembley win over Charlton Athletic.

He played over 100 games for Blackburn before joining Manchester City in 1989, where he was named Player of the Year in the 1989–90 season. His days at City were numbered, however, after he fell out of manager Peter Reid's plans when Reid took over in November 1990 on the departure of Howard Kendall to Everton.

He was re-signed for Blackburn by Kenny Dalglish in November 1991 for a fee of £700,000 and helped them to great success including promotion from the Second Division and winning the FA Premier League. In 1998, he got a move back to Scotland to play with Rangers where he was signed by manager Dick Advocaat for £4 million. However, despite winning the domestic treble in his first season, his time there was relatively unhappy with Advocaat claiming that Hendry was "not his type of player". After his spell at Rangers, Hendry moved back to the Premier League to Coventry City who paid £750,000 for him in February 2000. Hendry had a difficult spell for the Sky Blues with his appearances being limited, he was loaned to then First Division side Bolton Wanderers. He impressed manager Sam Allardyce who made the move permanent in February 2001, with Bolton agreeing to pay a fee of £500,000 should they gain promotion at the end of that season, which they subsequently did. He later moved to Preston North End on loan and finally Blackpool, initially a loan before being made permanent, before retiring from playing football. Overall, Hendry played more than 500 league games and scored more than 40 goals in a playing career spanning 20 years.

In November 2018, Hendry played a league game for Blackburn Sunday League side Moorgate F.C.

=== International ===
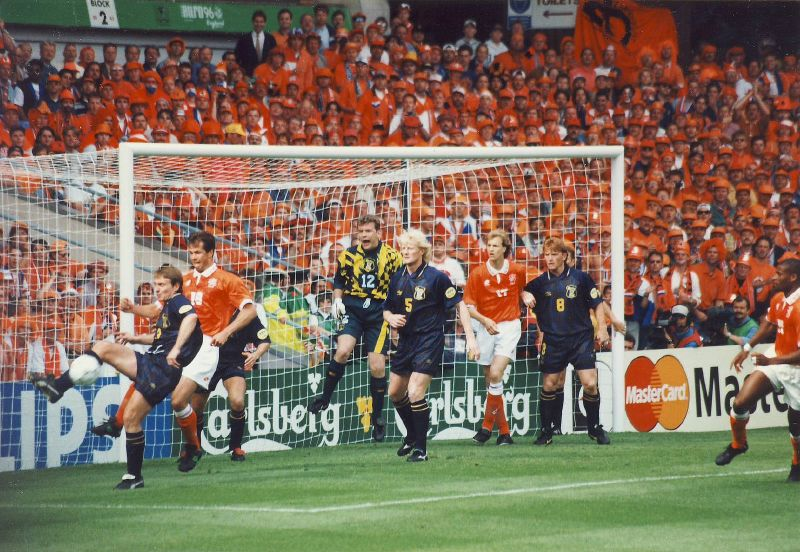
Hendry (blue, number five) playing for Scotland against Netherlands at Villa Park during Euro 1996

Hendry managed to win 51 caps for Scotland despite the fact that he was a latecomer to the international scene, not making his debut until he was 27. He captained Scotland in the 1998 World Cup. His last Scotland appearance, on 28 March 2001, saw Hendry score two goals in a 4–0 win over San Marino. His international career was ended as he was subsequently banned for six matches for elbowing San Marino substitute Nicola Albani later in that game.

== Coaching career ==
Hendry landed his first managerial job in June 2004 when he was appointed manager of his former club Blackpool replacing Steve McMahon. He was dismissed by the club on 29 November 2005 following a poor run of results.

On 9 September 2006 Hendry joined Boston United as assistant manager to Steve Evans.

On 11 June 2007 he became manager of Scottish First Division side Clyde. Hendry lost his first three games in charge. He picked up his first victory in a Scottish Challenge Cup tie against fellow First Division side Queen of the South in August 2007. His best run was a six-game undefeated streak from November 2007 to December 2007. His final game in charge of Clyde was a Scottish Cup fourth-round match, which Clyde lost 1–0 to Dundee United. Hendry resigned as manager of Clyde on 18 January 2008.

In June 2012, Hendry re-joined Blackburn Rovers, initially as first-team coach, working under manager and fellow Scot Steve Kean. He later became assistant manager of the club's under-21 team. On 12 June 2014, Hendry left Rovers.

== Personal life ==
Hendry's wife, Denise, died on 10 July 2009, aged 43. Her death was caused by complications during an operation that was needed following cosmetic surgery performed in April 2002. Hendry has four children by his wife. His son Callum is also a footballer.

On 23 June 2010, Hendry was formally declared bankrupt at Blackpool County Court. It was reported that he faced a tax bill of more than £1m and owed thousands of pounds to other creditors. One of the creditors was SpreadEx, a betting company.

On 22 April 2015, Hendry was banned from driving for 17 months after being tested and found to be almost twice over the legal limit of 35mg alcohol per 100ml of breath.

Hendry was charged with harassing and assaulting an ex-girlfriend in May 2015. He subsequently pleaded guilty to a charge of harassment, while the assault charge was dropped.

== Career statistics ==
=== Club ===
Appearances and goals by club, season and competition
Club	Season	League			National cup (Note: Includes Scottish Cup, FA Cup)		League cup (Note: Includes Scottish League Cup, Football League Cup)		Europe		Other		Total	
Club	Season	Division	Apps	Goals	Apps	Goals	Apps	Goals	Apps	Goals	Apps	Goals	Apps	Goals
Dundee	1983–84	Scottish Premier Division	4	0	1	0	0	0	—		—		5	0
Dundee	1984–85	Scottish Premier Division	4	0	0	0	0	0	—		—		4	0
Dundee	1985–86	Scottish Premier Division	20	0	3	1	0	0	—		—		23	1
Dundee	1986–87	Scottish Premier Division	13	2	1	0	0	0	—		—		14	2
Dundee	Total		41	2	5	1	0	0	—		—		46	3
Blackburn Rovers	1986–87	Second Division	13	3	0	0	0	0	—		3 (Note: Appearance(s) in Full Members' Cup)	1	16	3
Blackburn Rovers	1987–88	Second Division	44	12	0	0	1	0	—			0	46	12
Blackburn Rovers	1988–89	Second Division	38	7	0	0	0	0	—		3	0	41	7
Blackburn Rovers	1989–90	Second Division	7	0	0	0	0	0	—		1	0	8	0
Blackburn Rovers	Total		102	22	0	0	1	0	—		8	1	111	22
Manchester City	1989–90	First Division	25	3	3	1	1	0	—		0	0	29	4
Manchester City	1990–91	First Division	32	1	2	1	3	1	—		3	0	40	3
Manchester City	1991–92	First Division	6	1	0	0	1	0	—		1	2	8	3
Manchester City	Total		63	5	5	2	5	1	—		4	2	77	10
Blackburn Rovers	1991–92	Second Division	30	4	0	0	0	0	—		—		30	4
Blackburn Rovers	1992–93	Premier League	41	1	1	0	0	0	—		—		42	1
Blackburn Rovers	1993–94	Premier League	22	0	2	0	3	0	—		—		27	0
Blackburn Rovers	1994–95	Premier League	40	4	2	0	4	0	2 (Note: Appearances in UEFA Cup)	0	1 (Note: Appearance in FA Charity Shield)	0	49	4
Blackburn Rovers	1995–96	Premier League	33	1	0	0	4	0	5 (Note: Appearances in UEFA Champions League)	0	0	0	44	1
Blackburn Rovers	1996–97	Premier League	35	1	0	0	0	0	—		—		39	1
Blackburn Rovers	1997–98	Premier League	34	1	2	0	1	0	—		—		39	1
Blackburn Rovers	Total		235	12	7	0	12	0	7	0	1	0	262	12
Rangers	1998–99	Scottish Premier League	20	0	3	0	4	0	5	0	—		32	0
Rangers	1999–2000	Scottish Premier League	2	0	0	0	0	0	2	0	—		4	0
Rangers	Total		22	0	3	0	4	0	7	0	—		36	0
Coventry City	1999–2000	Premier League	9	0	0	0	0	0	—		—		9	0
Coventry City	2000–01	Premier League	2	0	0	0	0	0	—		—		2	0
Coventry City	Total		11	0	0	0	0	0	—		—		11	0
Bolton Wanderers	2000–01	First Division	22	3	1	0	0	0	—		3 (Note: Appearances in Football League First Division play-offs)	0	26	3
Bolton Wanderers	2001–02	Premier League	3	0	0	0	4	0	—		—		7	0
Bolton Wanderers	Total		25	3	1	0	4	0	—		3	0	33	3
Preston North End (loan)	2001–02	First Division	2	0	0	0	0	0	—		—		2	0
Blackpool (loan)	2002–03	Second Division	14	0	0	0	0	0	—		—		14	0
Career total			515	44	21	3	26	1	14	0	16	3	592	51

=== International ===
Appearances and goals by national team and year
National team	Year	Apps	Goals
Scotland	1993	3	1
Scotland	1994	6	0
Scotland	1995	5	0
Scotland	1996	9	0
Scotland	1997	5	0
Scotland	1998	10	0
Scotland	1999	6	0
Scotland	2000	5	0
Scotland	2001	2	2
Total		51	3

Scores and results list Scotland's goal tally first, score column indicates score after each Hendry goal.

List of international goals scored by Colin Hendry
No.	Date	Venue	Opponent	Score	Result	Competition
1	17 November 1993	National Stadium, Ta' Qali, Malta	Malta	2–0	2–0	1994 FIFA World Cup qualification
2	28 March 2001	Hampden Park, Glasgow, Scotland	San Marino	1–0	4–0	2002 FIFA World Cup qualification
3	28 March 2001	Hampden Park, Glasgow, Scotland	San Marino	2–0	4–0	2002 FIFA World Cup qualification

== Honours ==
Blackburn Rovers

- Premier League: 1994–95
- Football League Second Division play-offs: 1992
- Full Members' Cup: 1986–87

Rangers

- Scottish Premier League: 1998–99
- Scottish Cup: 1998–99
- Scottish League Cup: 1998–99

Bolton Wanderers

- Football League First Division play-offs: 2001

Individual

- PFA Team of the Year: 1988–89 Second Division, 1994–95 Premier League, 1997–98 Premier League
- Scottish FA International Roll of Honour: 2001

== See also ==
- List of Scotland national football team captains
