= Ian Angus (footballer) =

Scottish footballer

Personal information
- Full name: Ian Angus
- Date of birth: 19 November 1961 (age 64)
- Place of birth: Glasgow, Scotland
- Position: Midfielder

Senior career*
Years	Team	Apps	(Gls)
1980–1987	Aberdeen	84	(9)
1987–1990	Dundee	88	(10)
1990–1994	Motherwell	87	(8)
1994–1996	Clyde	56	(7)
1996–1997	Albion Rovers	8	(0)
1998–1999	Stirling Albion	0	(0)
Total		323	(34)
- * Club domestic league appearances and goals

Ian Angus (born 19 November 1961) is a Scottish former professional footballer.

Angus started his career in 1980 at Aberdeen, playing in 84 league matches during his seven years at Pittodrie. A 1987 move to Dundee brought a similar number of appearances in only three seasons and saw Angus move to Motherwell. In his first season at Fir Park, he helped them on their way to victory in the Scottish Cup, scoring in the 4–3 win against Dundee United. In 1994, Angus left Motherwell and joined Clyde, playing in the majority of matches over the next two seasons. His finest moment as a Clyde player came when he scored the opening goal against Rangers in the Scottish Cup, though Clyde went on to lose 4–1. A spell at Albion Rovers added a few more appearances. Angus made one League Cup appearance for Stirling Albion at the start of the 1998–99 season.

== Career statistics ==
=== Appearances and goals by club, season and competition ===
Club	Season	League			Scottish Cup		League Cup		Europe		Other		Total	
Club	Season	Division	Apps	Goals	Apps	Goals	Apps	Goals	Apps	Goals	Apps	Goals	Apps	Goals
Aberdeen	1979-80	Scottish Premier Division	0	0	0	0	0	0	0	0	-	-	0	0
Aberdeen	1980-81	Scottish Premier Division	19	1	1	0	0	0	0	0	-	-	20	1
Aberdeen	1981-82	Scottish Premier Division	1	0	0	0	1	0	1	0	-	-	3	0
Aberdeen	1982-83	Scottish Premier Division	5	3	0	0	4	0	1	0	-	-	10	3
Aberdeen	1983-84	Scottish Premier Division	12	0	5	1	4	0	3	0	-	-	24	1
Aberdeen	1984-85	Scottish Premier Division	28	2	5	1	0	0	2	1	-	-	35	4
Aberdeen	1985-86	Scottish Premier Division	17	2	4	0	1	0	4	0	-	-	26	2
Aberdeen	1986-87	Scottish Premier Division	2	1	0	0	0	0	0	0	-	-	2	1
Aberdeen	Total		84	9	15	2	10	0	11	1	-	-	120	12
Dundee	1986-87	Scottish Premier Division	29	4	4	0	3	2	0	0	-	-	36	6
Dundee	1987-88	Scottish Premier Division	40	6	6	1	4	0	0	0	-	-	50	7
Dundee	1988-89	Scottish Premier Division	15	0	1	1	0	0	0	0	-	-	16	1
Dundee	1989-90	Scottish Premier Division	4	0	0	0	0	0	0	0	-	-	4	0
Dundee	Total		88	10	11	2	7	2	0	0	-	-	106	14
Motherwell	1989-90	Scottish Premier Division	-	-	-	-	-	-	-	-	-	-	-	-
Motherwell	1990-91	Scottish Premier Division	-	-	-	-	-	-	-	-	-	-	-	-
Motherwell	1991-92	Scottish Premier Division	-	-	-	-	-	-	-	-	-	-	-	-
Motherwell	1992-93	Scottish Premier Division	-	-	-	-	-	-	-	-	-	-	-	-
Motherwell	1993-94	Scottish Premier Division	-	-	-	-	-	-	-	-	-	-	-	-
Motherwell	Total		87	8	9	1	5	1	1	0	-	-	102	10
Clyde	1994-95	Scottish Second Division	23	5	3	1	0	0	-	-	0	0	26	6
Clyde	1995-96	Scottish Second Division	33	2	4	1	0	0	-	-	1	0	38	3
Clyde	Total		56	7	7	2	0	0	-	-	1	0	64	9
Albion Rovers	1996-97	Scottish Third Division	8	0	-	-	-	-	-	-	-	-	8+	0+
Stirling Albion	1997-98	Scottish First Division	0	0	0	0	1	0	-	-	0	0	1	0
Career total			323	34	42+	7+	23+	3+	12	1	1	0	401+	45+

== Honours ==
=== Motherwell ===
- Scottish Cup: 1

1990–91
