= Jim Gillespie (footballer, born 1957) =

Scottish footballer

Personal information
- Date of birth: 4 November 1957 (age 68)
- Place of birth: Glasgow, Scotland
- Position: Forward

Senior career*
| Years | Team | Apps | (Gls) |
- Weirs Recreation
| 1979–1980 | Queen's Park | 25 | (21) |
| 1980–1982 | Gent | 17 | (6) |
| 1982–1983 | Standard Wettern | | |
| 1983–1984 | Motherwell | 16 | (0) |
| 1984–1985 | Morton | 30 | (8) |
| 1985–1986 | Clyde | 17 | (4) |
- Gent
| Total | | 105 | (39) |
- * Club domestic league appearances and goals

Jim Gillespie (born 4 November 1957) is a Scottish former professional footballer who played for Weirs Recreation, Queen's Park, Gent, Standard Wettern, Motherwell, Morton and Clyde, as a forward.
