= Eddie Gallagher (footballer) =

Scottish footballer

Personal information
- Date of birth: 21 November 1964 (age 61)
- Place of birth: Glasgow, Scotland
- Height: 5 ft 10 in (1.78 m)
- Position: Striker

Youth career
- Campsie Black Watch

Senior career*
| Years | Team | Apps | (Gls) |
| 1985–1988 | Partick Thistle | 90 | (24) |
| 1988 | Hamilton Academical | 14 | (3) |
| 1988–1991 | Dunfermline Athletic | 28 | (2) |
| 1991–1992 | Dundee | 27 | (11) |
| 1992–1994 | St Mirren | 35 | (17) |
| 1994–? | Instant-Dict | | |
- * Club domestic league appearances and goals

Eddie Gallagher (born 21 November 1964 in Glasgow) is a Scottish retired professional football striker. He played in his homeland for Partick Thistle, Hamilton Academical, Dunfermline Athletic, Dundee and St Mirren before moving to Hong Kong, where he signed for Instant-Dict in the summer of 1994. At Instant-Dict, he went without a goal in his first two months, then scored a hat-trick against Kui Tan in November 1994.
