= Dougie Robertson =

Scottish footballer (born 1963)

Personal information
- Full name: Douglas Robertson
- Date of birth: 15 March 1963 (age 63)
- Place of birth: Torphichen, West Lothian, Scotland
- Position: Striker

Senior career*
Years	Team	Apps	(Gls)
1981–1983	Rangers	26	(0)
1983–1989	Greenock Morton	173	(149)
1989	Falkirk	5	(1)
1990	Greenock Morton	8	(1)
- * Club domestic league appearances and goals

Dougie Robertson (born 15 March 1963 in Torphichen West Lothian is a Scottish former professional football player who is best known for his time with Greenock Morton.

Robertson began his career with Polbeth United Boys Club before joining Rangers. Whilst at Ibrox he made eighteen appearances. He left in 1983 to join Greenock Morton, where he would spend the majority of his career, making close to 200 appearances for the club. A brief spell with Falkirk in 1989 was followed by a return to Greenock before retiring in 1990.

== Personal life ==
Robertson's son David was a professional footballer, who also played for Morton.
