= John McCormack (footballer, born 1955) =

Scottish footballer and manager

Personal information
- Full name: John Duffy McCormack
- Date of birth: 25 April 1955 (age 71)
- Place of birth: Glasgow, Scotland
- Position: Defender

Senior career*
Years	Team	Apps	(Gls)
1976–1980	Clydebank	114	(24)
1980–1984	St Mirren	109	(6)
1984–1986	Dundee	61	(9)
1986–1987	Airdrieonians	44	(0)
1987–1988	Partick Thistle	19	(0)
Total		347	(39)

Managerial career
- 1997–1998: Dundee
- 1999–2002: Queen's Park
- 2002–2004: Greenock Morton
- 2005–2007: Bellshill Athletic
- 2007–2008: Albion Rovers
- 2009–2010: Clyde
- * Club domestic league appearances and goals

John Duffy McCormack (born 25 April 1955) is a Scottish former professional football player and coach who played as a defender and has managed several Scottish clubs.

== Career ==
Born in Glasgow, McCormack began his playing career in 1976 with Clydebank, making over 100 league appearances and scoring 24 times before joining St Mirren in 1980. While playing for St Mirren, McCormack acquired the nickname "Cowboy", because he had the same name as a professional boxer with that nickname. He moved to Dundee in 1984 before returning to the west of Scotland in 1986, spending single seasons with Airdrieonians and Partick Thistle before retiring in 1988.

Following his retirement from playing, McCormack was employed by Glasgow City Council for several years, working in sports centres in the city. He then returned to Dundee as a youth coach, before progressing to assistant manager and becoming manager in 1997. Just months later, McCormack was sacked – despite Dundee leading the Scottish Football League First Division – and went on to join Queen's Park. In November 2002, McCormack was appointed manager of Greenock Morton, guiding the club to the Scottish Third Division title in his first season. After losing a large lead at the top of the Second Division near the end of the 2003–04 season, McCormack was sacked in September 2004. He also had an assistant manager stint at Stenhousemuir but left within a month to become manager at Scottish Junior football side Bellshill.

McCormack was appointed manager of Scottish Third Division side Albion Rovers in May 2007, guiding the side to seventh place in his first season. In June 2008, McCormack left his position to take up an assistant role at newly promoted Scottish Premier League side Hamilton Academical. McCormack left the club only two months later, but later won a claim for wrongful dismissal against the club.

McCormack returned to the game in September 2009, becoming first team coach at Second Division club Clyde. McCormack was promoted to manager on 30 November 2009, after John Brown was sacked. McCormack was given a contract until the end of the 2009–2010 season, but he was sacked on 5 April, with the club facing almost certain relegation to the Third Division. Despite making a number of changes to the squad, McCormack had failed to arrest a decline in Clyde's fortunes and left the club in April 2010.

== Honours ==
Queen's Park

- Scottish Third Division promotion: 2001–02

Greenock Morton

- Renfrewshire Cup (2): 2002–03, 2003–04
- Scottish Third Division: 2002–03

Albion Rovers

- Lanarkshire Cup: 2007–08
