= John McQuillan (footballer) =

Scottish footballer

Personal information
- Date of birth: 20 July 1970 (age 56)
- Place of birth: Stranraer, Scotland
- Position: Right-back

Senior career*
Years	Team	Apps	(Gls)
1986–1987	Stranraer	1	(0)
1987–1995	Dundee	151	(5)
1995–2000	St Johnstone	137	(5)
2000–2002	Dundee United	26	(0)
2001	→ Alloa Athletic (loan)	11	(0)
2001–2002	→ Montrose (loan)	13	(0)
2002–2005	Montrose	82	(1)
Total		421	(11)
- * Club domestic league appearances and goals

John McQuillan (born 20 July 1970) is a Scottish former professional footballer.

== Career ==
McQuillan, a right-back, began his career with his hometown club Stranraer in 1986, despite having already played for Dundee United's victorious youth side in the Milk Cup earlier that year. After one season at Stair Park, McQuillan returned to Tayside but signed for United's rivals Dundee, beginning an eight-year stay at Dens Park. In 1991–92, McQuillan was part of Dundee's First Division-winning side, although he suffered relegation from the Premier Division two seasons later. At the beginning of the 1995–96 season, McQuillan moved to Tayside rivals St Johnstone, picking up another First Division title the following season. In March 2000, weeks before the end of his contract, McQuillan moved to Dundee United for £50,000. Featuring as a first-choice in the remainder of that season, McQuillan played in fifteen matches the 2000–01 season before moving on loan to Alloa Athletic for the final months of the season. McQuillan started the 2001–02 season on loan at Montrose and in February 2002, made his loan spell permanent, going on to spend another two seasons at Links Park before playing his final match in May 2004.

It is unknown whether McQuillan stayed in football after retiring.

== Career statistics ==
Club performance			League		Cup		League Cup		Continental		Total	
Season	Club	League	Apps	Goals	Apps	Goals	Apps	Goals	Apps	Goals	Apps	Goals
Scotland			League		Scottish Cup		League Cup		Europe		Total	
1986–87	Stranraer	Scottish Second Division	1	0	N/A		N/A		-		1	0
1987–88	Dundee	Scottish Premier Division	151	5	N/A		N/A		N/A		151	5
1988–89	Dundee	Scottish Premier Division	151	5	N/A		N/A		N/A		151	5
1989–90	Dundee	Scottish Premier Division	151	5	N/A		N/A		N/A		151	5
1990–91	Dundee	Scottish First Division	151	5	N/A		N/A		N/A		151	5
1991–92	Dundee	Scottish First Division	151	5	N/A		N/A		N/A		151	5
1992–93	Dundee	Scottish Premier Division	151	5	N/A		N/A		N/A		151	5
1993–94	Dundee	Scottish Premier Division	151	5	N/A		N/A		N/A		151	5
1994–95	Dundee	Scottish First Division	151	5	N/A		N/A		N/A		151	5
1995–96	St Johnstone	Scottish First Division	N/A		N/A		N/A		N/A		N/A	
1996–97	St Johnstone	Scottish First Division	N/A		1	0	2	0	-		3	0
1997–98	St Johnstone	Scottish Premier Division	34	1	3	0	2	0	-		39	1
1998–99	St Johnstone	Scottish Premier League	28	1	3	0	5	0	-		36	1
1999–00	St Johnstone	Scottish Premier League	18	1	-		1	0	4	0	23	1
1999–00	Dundee United	Scottish Premier League	11	0	1	0	-		-		12	0
2000–01	Dundee United	Scottish Premier League	15	0	-		3	0	-		18	0
2000–01	Alloa Athletic (loan)	Scottish Second Division	11	0	-		-		-		11	0
2001–02	Montrose	Scottish Third Division	27	0	-		1	0	-		28	0
2002–03	Montrose	Scottish Third Division	35	0	2	0	1	0	-		38	0
2003–04	Montrose	Scottish Third Division	33	1	4	0	2	0	-		39	1
Career total			384	109	48	12	79	38	60	11	571	170
