= Tommy Coyne =

Irish footballer (born 1962)

Personal information
- Full name: Thomas Coyne
- Date of birth: 14 November 1962 (age 63)
- Place of birth: Glasgow, Scotland
- Height: 5 ft 11 in (1.80 m)
- Position: Striker

Youth career
- 1980–1981: Hillwood Boys Club

Senior career*
Years	Team	Apps	(Gls)
1981–1983	Clydebank	80	(38)
1983–1986	Dundee United	62	(9)
1986–1989	Dundee	89	(50)
1989–1993	Celtic	105	(43)
1993	Tranmere Rovers	12	(1)
1993–1998	Motherwell	132	(57)
1998–2000	Dundee	18	(0)
1999	→ Falkirk (loan)	8	(1)
2000–2001	Clydebank	15	(4)
2001	Albion Rovers	1	(0)
Total		522	(205)

International career
1992–1997	Republic of Ireland	22	(6)

Managerial career
- 2000–2001: Clydebank
- 2003–2005: Bellshill Athletic
- * Club domestic league appearances and goals

Thomas Coyne (born 14 November 1962) is a former football player and manager. Coyne played for several clubs, mostly in Scotland, including Clydebank, Dundee United, Dundee, Celtic and Motherwell. He was the top goalscorer of the Scottish Premier Division three times, a feat he achieved with three clubs (Dundee, Celtic and Motherwell). Coyne played international football for the Republic of Ireland, qualifying due to his Irish ancestry. Towards the end of his playing career he was also the manager of Clydebank, a position he left after six months.

== Club career ==
Coyne was raised in Govan as a supporter of Celtic and attracted the attention of their scouts in his teens, though no move materialised. He had already turned down Dundee United in the hope of joining Celtic.

Coyne has stated that he would never have signed for Rangers, whose stadium was very close to his home and school, as he was a Catholic, which contravened their signing policy of the time. He played for Hillwood Boys Club before starting his professional career at Clydebank, where he made his debut in the 1981–82 season, scoring 9 goals in 31 matches. Scoring in 38 matches in his second season, he began the 1983–84 season with 10 in 11 games before being sold to Dundee United, then a force in Scottish football as part of the New Firm and the defending league champions, for £65,000. However, Coyne failed to reproduce his Clydebank form at Tannadice and scored only 9 goals in 62 league games, though he did score a few goals in the UEFA Cup, one of which came in the club's run to the 1987 final.

Halfway through the 1986–87 season he was transferred to city rivals Dundee for £75,000 and found his scoring boots again, notching up 9 goals in 20 games in the second half of the season and forming an effective partnership with fellow new signing Keith Wright, earning them the nicknames "The cobra" and "the Mongoose". In the 1987–88 season Coyne was top scorer in the Premier Division as he scored 33 goals in 43 matches, a total which earned him third place in the European Golden Boot contest. After scoring 9 goals in 20 matches at the start of the 1988–89 season he was sold on to Celtic for £500,000, the largest transfer fee Dundee had received.

Coyne again failed to carry on his scoring form at the start of his Celtic career and did not score for the remainder of the season. The following campaign was also hardly a success, with 7 goals in 23 games. However the next season, 1990–91, saw him revert to good form with 18 goals in 26 games, as he finished as the division's top scorer. Despite scoring 15 goals in the following season and three in ten games at the start of 1992–93, Coyne was allowed to transfer to Tranmere Rovers in March 1993 for a fee reported at £400,000, a record outlay for the Birkenhead club.

After a short spell in England, Coyne returned to Scotland to join Motherwell in November 1993 for £125,000. They challenged for the title in his first campaign, eventually finishing third, and in 1994–95 he was again the Scottish Premier Division's top scorer (16 goals) as the club finished runners-up – he is the only player to achieve that feat with three clubs. Performing well alongside Dougie Arnott and fellow Glasgow-born Irish international Owen Coyle, he scored 61 goals in 156 games for Motherwell in all competitions.

Coyne left for Dundee in 1998, where he was loaned out to Falkirk. He then returned to his first club, Clydebank, as player/manager in August 2000 and picked up the Scottish Second Division Manager of the Month award a month later. However, he was sacked after six months after the club had entered administration despite being near the top of Division Two. Soon after leaving Clydebank he joined Albion Rovers, where he ended his playing career.

== International career ==
In his international career, Coyne won 22 caps for the Republic of Ireland and scored 6 goals. He made his international debut at the age of 29 on 25 March 1992 against Switzerland in a friendly played at Lansdowne Road, Dublin. This game was the international debut for Eddie McGoldrick and was Paul McGrath's fiftieth cap. Coyne waited just 27 minutes before scoring his first international goal. He was replaced by John Aldridge in the eightieth minute, who converted from the penalty spot to make it a 2–1 victory for the Republic. Thanks to good performances in warm-up fixtures including a win over the Netherlands and injury to Niall Quinn, Coyne started three of Ireland's four matches in the 1994 FIFA World Cup but he failed to score in the tournament although he was praised for his efforts particularity in an unexpected victory over Italy with the Irish matchwinner being another Glaswegian, Ray Houghton; Coyne was with Motherwell at the time and became the first serving player from that club to appear at the World Cup.

His best game for Ireland was perhaps the 4–0 victory over Liechtenstein on 12 October 1994, played at Lansdowne Road, in which he scored two goals in the opening four minutes of the game but failed to achieve his hat-trick. He played his last game for the Republic, coming on as a substitute for David Connolly, in the 1–1 draw with Belgium on 29 October 1997. The game was the first leg of a playoff for qualification for the 1998 World Cup, Belgium won the second leg 2–1 and qualified for the 1998 World Cup.

== Managerial career ==
After finishing his playing career, Coyne coached Junior club Bellshill Athletic. The club won the West Division One in 2003–04, but Coyne left the job in July 2005.

== Personal life ==
Coyne's attempt to establish himself in English football in 1993 ended abruptly when his wife Alison died after consuming alcohol and painkillers. She had been suffering from post-natal depression following the birth of their third son. Coyne temporarily stopped playing football and had to return to Scotland to seek support from relatives in caring for his young children. Tranmere only recouped around a third of his transfer fee outlay from his next club Motherwell.

His eldest son, also named Tommy, also became a footballer and striker who played for clubs in the lower senior leagues in Scotland and for Linlithgow Rose in the Junior grade, where he has gained a 'player of the year award' and scored 38 goals in the 2009–10 season, eventually going on to break scoring records at the club. Another son, Bradley, played for Stirling Albion in the Scottish Third Division. He has a third son from his first marriage and two younger children with his second wife Anita.

== Honours ==
Dundee United

- Scottish Cup: Runner-up 1985

Celtic

- Scottish Cup: Runner-up 1990

Motherwell

- Scottish Premier Division: Runner-up 1994–95

Individual

- SPFA Team of the Year: 1994

== See also ==
- List of footballers in Scotland by number of league appearances (500+)
- List of footballers in Scotland by number of league goals (200+)
- List of Republic of Ireland international footballers born outside the Republic of Ireland
