= Mark Craib =

Scottish footballer

Personal information
- Date of birth: 8 February 1970 (age 56)
- Place of birth: St. Andrews, Scotland
- Position: Central defender

Youth career
- Celtic Boys Club

Senior career*
Years	Team	Apps	(Gls)
1988–1992	Dundee	64	(1)
1992–2002	Montrose	281	(10)
- Tayport
Total		345	(11)
- * Club domestic league appearances and goals

Mark Craib (born 8 February 1970) is a former Scottish footballer, who played in the Scottish Football League for Dundee and Montrose.
