= Ross Jack =

Scottish footballer and manager

Personal information
- Full name: James Ross Jack
- Date of birth: 21 March 1959 (age 67)
- Place of birth: Avoch, Scotland
- Position: Forward

Senior career*
Years	Team	Apps	(Gls)
1973–1975	Ross County		
1975–1980	Everton	1	(1)
1979–1980	→ Cardiff City (loan)	0	(0)
1979–1983	Norwich City	56	(10)
1983–1985	Lincoln City	60	(16)
1985–1988	Dundee	38	(4)
1987–1991	Dunfermline Athletic	130	(46)
1991–1993	Kilmarnock	55	(13)
1992–1993	→ Sligo Rovers (loan)	7	(2)
1993	Montrose	9	(2)
1993–1994	Ayr United	18	(0)
- Alness United
- Avoch

Managerial career
- 1993: Montrose (player-manager)
- 2009–2014: Elgin City
- 2014–2018: Turriff United
- 2019-2024: Rothes
- * Club domestic league appearances and goals

James Ross Jack (born 21 March 1959) is a Scottish football player and manager.

== Playing career ==
A striker, Jack began his career with Ross County, where he played in the Highland Football League at the age of 14. He then joined Everton, initially as an apprentice before graduating to the professional ranks. He made only a solitary, goalscoring appearance, for Everton and, after a loan spell at Cardiff City, he joined Norwich City for £20,000 in December 1979. He would have to wait almost a year before making his Norwich debut against Ipswich Town in the League Cup in September 1980. In the 1981–82 season, he scored 10 league goals for Norwich and, with two in the FA Cup and two more in the Football League Cup, was the club's leading scorer for the season. In the summer of 1983, a fee of £15,000 secured his transfer to Lincoln City where he remained for the next two seasons. His last game for Lincoln, and in England, was in May 1985, against Bradford City, in a game overshadowed by the Bradford City stadium fire, which killed 56 spectators. In July 1985, he returned to Scotland to join Dundee.

In October 1987, Dunfermline Athletic's manager Jim Leishman paid £15,000 to secure Jack's services and he made an instant impression, scoring on his debut in a 3–2 away defeat to Motherwell. In each of his three seasons at the club, Jack would finish as Dunfermline's leading scorer, his most successful season being the 1989–1990 campaign when he was the second highest goalscorer in the Scottish Premier League, his 16 league goals placing him just one goal behind John Robertson. In July 1991 a fee of £45,000 was sufficient to see Jack move to Kilmarnock. Following a brief loan to Sligo Rovers (January – March 1993), Jack was appointed player-manager of Montrose in March 1993. His spell would last only six months and in October 1993 he moved on to Ayr United before retiring from the professional game at the end of the 1993–1994 season.

== Coaching career ==
Post retirement, Jack moved into coaching, primarily focusing with work with the Scottish Football Association (SFA), first as the SFA's Highlands and Islands area community development officer and then as the SFA's North of Scotland Football Development Officer. In October 2001 it was announced that he would leave this role to take up the position of High Performance Football Coach at the Scottish Institute of Sport, a role he commenced in December 2001. On his appointment, Jack was quoted as saying "this new role is one where I hope we can make a difference to the future prospects of Scottish football." He continued to play football at a junior level, particularly in the North Caledonian Football League with Alness United and, in the summer months, with hometown Avoch.

In October 2007 there was speculation that Jack may make a return to management with Ross County with The Scotsman quoting Jack as saying "the time could be right for me to get back into the game. I could think of no better club than Ross County to do that with. I'm a local boy and County have played a big part in my life." but the return did not materialise. In April 2008, his post as the Scottish Institute of Sport's high-performance football coach was axed after the Scottish FA decided that the coaching of young players was best done by the individual clubs. Jack finally made his return to Ross County when he was appointed assistant coach in July 2008. In December 2008 Ross lost his job with Ross County due to the managerial team wanting to take a "new direction".

In January 2009, Jack was appointed manager of Elgin City in the Scottish Third Division. After five years with the club, Jack left Elgin City in January 2014 by mutual consent.

On 23 April 2014, Jack was appointed manager of Turriff United a Scottish Highland Football League club from Aberdeenshire. After 4 years in that position Jack left the team after helping them reach 2nd place in the Highland League, their highest ranking ever.

In September 2019, Jack was appointed manager of Rothes, winning the 2019-20 Highland League cup and the 2021-22 North of Scotland Cup before Leaving the club by mutual consent in Jan 2024. during that time he combined that with work as a coach in the Inverness Caledonian Thistle Youth Academy, He is currently (2025) Head of Youth at Inverness and also assists with coaching the 1st team.
