= Derek McWilliams =

Scottish footballer

Personal information
- Date of birth: 16 January 1966 (age 60)
- Place of birth: Broxburn, Scotland
- Position: Midfielder

Team information
- Current team: Broxburn Athletic (assistant manager)

Senior career*
Years	Team	Apps	(Gls)
1982–1983	Hibernian	2	(0)
1983–1984	Broxburn Athletic		
1984–1987	Dundee	32	(3)
1986	→ Stirling Albion (loan)	4	(0)
1987–1991	Falkirk	120	(41)
1991–1994	Dunfermline Athletic	69	(9)
1994–1997	Partick Thistle	79	(8)
1997–2000	Clydebank	55	(7)
2000	Partick Thistle	10	(3)
2000	East Stirlingshire	2	(0)
2000–2001	East Fife	2	(0)
2001	Airdrieonians.	6	(0)
Total		381	(71)

Managerial career
- 2017–2020: Livingston FC U20
- 2023–2025: Broxburn Athletic (assistant manager)
- * Club domestic league appearances and goals

Derek McWilliams (born 16 January 1966 in Broxburn) is a Scottish footballer, who played for Hibernian, Broxburn Athletic, Dundee, Stirling Albion, Falkirk, Dunfermline Athletic, Partick Thistle, Clydebank, East Stirlingshire, East Fife and Airdrieonians. McWilliams notably made a starting appearance in the 1991 Scottish League Cup Final during his spell with Dunfermline, facing his former club Hibernian. He is currently the assistant manager of Broxburn Athletic.

== Managerial career ==
In 2017, McWilliams was appointed Co-Manager of Livingston U20 squad along with Steve Pittman. The pair left the position in 2020.

McWilliams was appointed as Steve Pittman's assistant manager at Broxburn Athletic in January 2023. He left the role in September 2025 following the appointment of new manager, John Millar.
