= Vince Mennie =

Scottish–German footballer (born 1964)

Personal information
- Date of birth: 19 May 1964 (age 62)
- Place of birth: Dortmund, West Germany
- Position: Midfielder

Youth career
- Borussia Lippstadt

Senior career*
| Years | Team | Apps | (Gls) |
| 1983–1986 | 1. FC Köln | 29 | (1) |
| 1986–1989 | Dundee | 64 | (3) |
| 1989 | Falkirk | 7 | (1) |
| 1989–1990 | Forfar Athletic | 1 | (0) |
- Wuppertaler SV
| Total | | 101 | (5) |
- * Club domestic league appearances and goals

Vincent "Vince" Mennie (born 19 May 1964) is a Scottish–German former professional footballer who played as a midfielder for 1. FC Köln. He was the first Scot to play in the Bundesliga. He also played for Dundee, Falkirk, Forfar Athletic and Wuppertaler SV.

== Career ==
=== In Germany ===
Born in Dortmund in the German state of North Rhine-Westphalia, Mennie was a tough midfield player. He was the first Scotsman to play in the Bundesliga where he began his senior career. He was also the first Scot to score there. He played 29 first team league games for the North Rhine-Westphalia club FC Köln from 1983. During his third season he transferred to Scotland.

=== In Scotland ===
Aged 21, his first club in Scotland was Dundee where he made 64 league appearances between seasons from 1985–86 to 1988–89.

During season 1988–89 he joined Falkirk for whom he played in seven league games. The season after he played in one league game for Forfar Athletic.

=== Return to Germany ===
After his brief period at Forfar he returned to play for another club in North Rhine-Westphalia, Wuppertaler SV. At the time Wuppertaler SV were playing in the Amateur Oberliga Nordrhein (III) in the regionalised third tier of German football.
