= John Brown (footballer, born 1962) =

Scottish footballer and manager

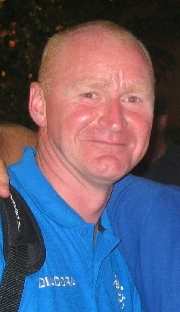
- Brown in 2005

Personal information
- Full name: John Brown
- Date of birth: 26 January 1962 (age 64)
- Place of birth: Lennoxtown, Scotland
- Positions: Defender; utility player

Youth career
- St Mirren Boys Club

Senior career*
Years	Team	Apps	(Gls)
1979–1984	Hamilton Academical	133	(11)
1984–1988	Dundee	114	(31)
1988–1997	Rangers	207	(14)
Total		454	(53)

Managerial career
- 1997–2006: Rangers (youth/reserve)
- 2008–2009: Clyde
- 2013–2014: Dundee
- * Club domestic league appearances and goals

John Brown (born 26 January 1962) is a Scottish former professional footballer who also worked as a manager. Brown played for Hamilton Academical, Dundee and Rangers, primarily as a central defender but also as a left full-back or defensive midfielder.

Brown was a first team regular for Rangers as they won eight consecutive Scottish League championships between 1988 and 1996. After retiring as a player, he became a coach and has managed Clyde and Dundee. Known for his combative playing style, he is often referred to by the nickname "Bomber".

== Playing career ==
=== Early years: Hamilton, Dundee ===
Born in Lennoxtown, Stirlingshire and raised in Blantyre, South Lanarkshire, Brown started his career at St Mirren Boys Club before signing for Hamilton Academical, where he played part-time whilst working as a welder. One of his most notable contributions with the Accies was scoring a hat-trick in a 9–1 win over Berwick Rangers while playing at left back, of which none of the goals was a penalty: he became the first defender in the Scottish League ever to achieve this; he stated that John Blackley, who was his teammate then manager at Hamilton, was an important influence on his early career.

In summer 1984, Brown became a fully professional player when he moved on to Dundee, signing for manager Archie Knox for a fee of £40,000. At Dens Park, Brown often found himself featuring in an attacking midfield role. He quickly endeared himself to the supporters with the winning goal in a Dundee derby match which finished 4–3. In February 1985 he scored the goal which saw Dundee eliminate Rangers from the 1984–85 Scottish Cup in Glasgow, and in November of the same year he scored all three in a 3–2 league victory over the same club in Dundee. At the end of that season he was part of the Dark Blues team that defeated Hearts 2–0 on the final day (setting up the first goal with a typically committed aerial challenge), allowing Celtic to overtake the Edinburgh club to take the title.

Shortly after he had netted a winning goal against Rangers for a third time in September 1986, Hearts made an approach to sign Brown, but he failed the medical examination having undergone several operations on his cartilage. He also endured disappointment on the field that year, as Dundee United prevailed 3–2 over their local rivals in the semi-final of the 1986–87 Scottish Cup. Over three-and-a-half seasons with Dundee, Brown scored 39 goals in 135 appearances, and won the Forfarshire Cup.

=== Rangers ===
25-year-old Brown was signed by Rangers, the club he supported in childhood, in January 1988 for £350,000; he had played against the Glasgow club days earlier and been involved in a confrontation with player-manager Graeme Souness during the match. He went on to feature in 278 games for the Gers in several positions, scoring 18 goals; along the way, as a squad player he managed to collect eight League titles, three Scottish Cups and three League Cups. He played no part in the two finals which Rangers reached but did not win during his spell with the club (1989 Scottish League Cup Final, 1994 Scottish Cup Final).

In the 1992–93 season, Brown played in 59 matches, partnering Richard Gough in central defence in many of them, as the club won the domestic treble, went on a long unbeaten run but were knocked out in the group stages of the Champions League. Brown's final competitive match was the 1996 Scottish Cup Final which Rangers won 5–1 over Hearts. He retired from playing in May 1997 after Rangers won their ninth consecutive title.

There was some controversy, with Brown once calling the fans of rivals Aberdeen "morons" in response to their behaviour and song choices during matches against Rangers.

Despite his prolonged success at club level, he was never selected for Scotland.

== Coaching career ==
=== Rangers youths and Clyde ===
Brown took over as coach of Rangers' Under-18s in 1997 before moving on to coach the reserve team in 2003, replacing former teammate John McGregor. He left the Rangers coaching setup on 27 June 2006, weeks after the appointment of new manager Paul Le Guen.

Brown was linked with the vacant Clyde job in June 2007, but lost out after the job was given to former Scotland captain Colin Hendry. On 21 November 2007, Brown was announced as the new manager of Dumbarton; the following day, however, it emerged that Brown had turned down the post for personal reasons.

Brown was appointed Clyde manager on 26 January 2008, succeeding Colin Hendry. Brown's first game in charge came in a disappointing 3–1 defeat by Stirling Albion on 2 February 2008. He achieved his aim of keeping Clyde in the Scottish First Division via the playoffs and was given a contract until 2011 in December 2008. After leading the club to only three wins in 15 games at the start of the 2009–10 season, Brown was sacked on 21 November 2009.

Brown made an unsuccessful attempt to take control of Rangers from the Sevco consortium, led by Charles Green, in July 2012; earlier he had spoken to the media regarding the problems at the club, and made a passionate speech to a crowd of fellow supporters at the main entrance to Ibrox Stadium.

=== Dundee ===
Brown was appointed manager of Dundee on an interim basis in February 2013, with the club struggling to remain in the top division; the board described him as 'perfect' for the job. His appointment was not well received by the fans, despite being fan favorite during his playing days for the club. In his first game in charge, a 2–2 draw against St Johnstone, Brown praised his players, describing them as having great spirit.

He experienced his first Dundee derby as manager in the quarter-final of the Scottish Cup, which Dundee lost 2–1. After the match Brown was critical with the officials, claiming they were not doing their jobs. Preparations for that match were disrupted when long-serving goalkeeper Robert Douglas reacted badly to Brown signing Steve Simonsen; The feud between the two men continued for some years afterwards.

Brown managed to get his first win in a 2–1 victory against St Mirren, and speaking to BBC Scotland's Jim Spence afterwards stated his belief that the club might have a chance of survival. Brown was awarded Scottish Premier League Manager of the Month in April 2013 after securing four victories during the month, but despite this upturn in results, Dundee were relegated to the new Scottish Championship.

On 3 February 2014 it was announced that Brown had left his role as manager of Dundee after agreeing a severance package with the club. Dundee were in a tie for first place in the 2013–14 Scottish Championship, behind Falkirk on goal difference, but the club acted to remove Brown after a run of three games without a win; they would go on to win the division and secure promotion back to the top tier.

He was later appointed as a club ambassador at Rangers, and in 2017 took on a scouting role at the club.

== Managerial statistics ==
As of 3 February 2014.

Team	Nat	From	To	Record							
Team	Nat	From	To	G	W	D	L	GF	GA	GD	Win %
Clyde	(Scotland)	26 January 2008	21 November 2009	136	38	32	66	156	215	−59	27.94
Dundee	(Scotland)	23 February 2013	3 February 2014	39	18	8	13	58	41	+17	46.15
Total				175	56	40	79	214	257	−43	32.00

== Honours ==
=== Player ===
Rangers

- Scottish Premier Division (8): 1988–89, 1989–90, 1990–91, 1991–92, 1992–93, 1993–94, 1994–95, 1995–96 (Note: Did not play in the 1996–97 season.)
- Scottish Cup: 1991–92, 1992–93, 1995–96
- Scottish League Cup: 1988–89, 1990–91, 1992–93 (Note: Did not play in the 1993 Scottish League Cup Final.)

=== Manager ===
Clyde

- Scottish First Division play-off 2007–08
