= Stuart Rafferty =

Scottish footballer

Personal information
- Full name: Stuart Rafferty
- Date of birth: 6 March 1961 (age 65)
- Place of birth: Greenock, Scotland
- Height: 1.83 m (6 ft 0 in)
- Position: Midfielder

Youth career
- –1978: Port Glasgow B.C.

Senior career*
Years	Team	Apps	(Gls)
1978–1984	Motherwell	89	(17)
1984–1989	Dundee	163	(12)
1989–1991	Dunfermline Athletic	46	(1)
1991–1994	Greenock Morton	107	(5)
Total		405	(35)
- * Club domestic league appearances and goals as of 12:33, 6 March 2009 (UTC)

Stuart Rafferty (born 6 March 1961) is a Scottish former footballer, who played as a midfielder for Motherwell, Dundee, Dunfermline Athletic before ending his career with his local club Greenock Morton.
