= Stevie Campbell =

Scottish footballer and coach

Personal information
- Date of birth: 20 November 1967 (age 58)
- Place of birth: Dundee, Scotland
- Position: Defender

Senior career*
Years	Team	Apps	(Gls)
1985–1993	Dundee	98	(5)
1994–1995	Coleraine	3	(3)
1996–1997	Livingston	49	(5)
1997–2000	Brechin City	74	(5)
Total		254	(18)

International career
- Scotland U19
1988–1989	Scotland U21	3	(0)

Managerial career
- 2000: Carnoustie Panmure
- 2018: Brechin City (caretaker)
- * Club domestic league appearances and goals

Stevie Campbell (born 20 November 1967) is a Scottish footballer and coach, who was most recently the assistant manager of Scottish League One team Brechin City. Campbell played professionally for Dundee, Livingston and Brechin City in Scotland and Coleraine in Northern Ireland. He was player-manager of Carnoustie Panmure before becoming a youth coach with Dundee and then Inverness Caledonian Thistle. He then joined Dundee United in January 2006, initially as under-19 coach, later becoming youth director from 2009 until his resignation in November 2015. He joined Brechin's coaching staff in August 2016.

== Playing career ==
=== Club ===
Campbell began his career in 1985 with hometown club Dundee and made just under 100 league appearances for the Dens Park side during his eight years there. A two-year spell with Northern Irish side Coleraine followed his departure from Dundee before a 1995 move to Livingston, where Campbell won the Third Division in his first season. In 1997, Campbell moved to Brechin City, where he remained until 2000.

=== International ===
In 1987, Campbell played in all four matches as Scotland under-19s reached the quarter-finals of the 1987 FIFA World Youth Championship, and he went on to win three Scotland under-21 caps.

== Coaching career ==
Campbell moved to Carnoustie Panmure in 2000 as player/manager but quickly retired due to injury, and accepted a full-time youth coach post with Dundee. Campbell moved to Inverness Caledonian Thistle in the summer of 2005. He then moved to Dundee United six months later, along with incoming manager Craig Brewster. Campbell was appointed as the club's youth director in 2009, but was suspended by the club in August 2015. A supporters' group expressed concern at the suspension, citing the benefits gained from Campbell's record in developing young players. The club subsequently accepted Campbell's resignation in November 2015, following his decision to take them to an employment tribunal.

Campbell joined Brechin City as first team coach in August 2016, assisting manager Darren Dods. After Dods was sacked by Brechin in October 2018, Campbell was made caretaker manager. He stayed with Brechin after Barry Smith was appointed manager. He left the club in 2020.

== Honours ==
=== Club ===
Livingston

- Scottish Third Division: 1995–96
