= Tosh McKinlay =

Scottish footballer

Personal information
- Full name: Thomas Valley McKinlay
- Date of birth: 3 December 1964 (age 61)
- Place of birth: Glasgow, Scotland
- Height: 5 ft 7 in (1.70 m)
- Position: Left back

Youth career
- Celtic Boys Club
- 1981–1983: Dundee

Senior career*
Years	Team	Apps	(Gls)
1983–1988	Dundee	162	(8)
1988–1994	Heart of Midlothian	206	(7)
1994–1999	Celtic	99	(0)
1998	→ Stoke City (loan)	3	(0)
1999–2000	Grasshopper Club Zürich	4	(0)
2000	Kilmarnock	15	(0)
Total		489	(15)

International career
1983–1985	Scotland U21	6	(0)
1995–1998	Scotland	22	(0)
1998	Scotland B	2	(0)
- * Club domestic league appearances and goals

Thomas Valley "Tosh" McKinlay (born 3 December 1964) is a Scottish former footballer. A fullback or wingback, he spent most of his career in Scotland playing for Dundee, Heart of Midlothian, Celtic and Kilmarnock. He also played for English club Stoke City and Swiss side Grasshoppers. He won 22 international caps for Scotland.

McKinlay works for Celtic as a scout.

== Club career ==
McKinlay was an outstanding schoolboy footballer in Glasgow, winning trophies with St Peter's Boys Primary in Partick and St Thomas Aquinas, Jordanhill; he played left wing and was a regular goalscorer with a strong shot on his left foot, only moving to fullback when he turned professional – perhaps surprisingly, he did not score many goals thereafter. He represented Scotland at schoolboy level.

McKinlay began his professional career with Dundee, whom he joined from Celtic Boys Club in 1981. He became a first-team regular while still a teenager and spent over seven years at Dens Park, where he played in three major cup semi-finals and scored a memorable goal in the Dundee derby, before being sold to Heart of Midlothian for £300,000 in December 1988. He stayed with the Tynecastle club for almost six years, including a runners-up finish behind Rangers in 1991–92.

In November 1994 he joined Celtic in a £350,000 transfer, and just over six months later gained his sole winner's medal as the Glasgow side led by manager Tommy Burns defeated Airdrie to win the 1994–95 Scottish Cup. He provided an assist for the only goal of the final, crossing for Pierre Van Hooijdonk to head in, although in the league they were unable to overtake Rangers during the period. McKinlay was a regular player for the Hoops until he was displaced by Stéphane Mahé in the 1997–98 season, during which time he was involved in a training ground brawl with Henrik Larsson and went on loan to Stoke City; he played three times for the Potters in 1997–98.

After leaving Celtic permanently in 1999, McKinlay spent a year in Switzerland with Grasshopper Club Zürich before returning to Scotland to finish his career with a short spell at Kilmarnock. On retiring he took up a post as an internet sports journalist with a Norwegian media company. He now works as an agent for Celtic Media.

== International career ==
McKinlay won his first full Scotland cap aged 30 in 1995 against Greece and went on to earn selection for both the 1996 European Championships and the 1998 World Cup, where he played as a substitute in the opening game against world champions Brazil and retired after the loss to Morocco which resulted in elimination from the tournament.

== Career statistics ==
=== Club ===
Appearances and goals by club, season and competition
Club	Season	League			National Cup		League Cup		Europe		Total	
Club	Season	Division	Apps	Goals	Apps	Goals	Apps	Goals	Apps	Goals	Apps	Goals
Dundee	1982–83	Scottish Premier Division	1	0	?	?	?	?	–		1	0
Dundee	1983–84	Scottish Premier Division	36	3	?	?	?	?	–		36	3
Dundee	1984–85	Scottish Premier Division	34	3	?	?	?	?	–		34	3
Dundee	1985–86	Scottish Premier Division	22	0	?	?	?	?	–		22	0
Dundee	1986–87	Scottish Premier Division	32	2	?	?	?	?	–		32	2
Dundee	1987–88	Scottish Premier Division	19	0	?	?	?	?	–		19	0
Dundee	1988–89	Scottish Premier Division	18	0	?	?	?	?	–		18	0
Dundee	Total		162	8	23	0	19	1	0	0	204	9
Heart of Midlothian	1988–89	Scottish Premier Division	17	1	3	0	0	0	2	0	22	1
Heart of Midlothian	1989–90	Scottish Premier Division	29	1	2	0	0	0	–		31	1
Heart of Midlothian	1990–91	Scottish Premier Division	33	2	1	0	3	0	4	0	41	2
Heart of Midlothian	1991–92	Scottish Premier Division	39	2	5	0	3	0	–		47	2
Heart of Midlothian	1992–93	Scottish Premier Division	34	1	3	0	3	1	4	0	44	2
Heart of Midlothian	1993–94	Scottish Premier Division	43	0	3	0	2	0	2	0	50	0
Heart of Midlothian	1994–95	Scottish Premier Division	11	0	0	0	1	0	–		12	0
Heart of Midlothian	Total		206	7	17	0	12	1	12	0	247	8
Celtic	1994–95	Scottish Premier Division	17	0	5	0	0	0	–		22	0
Celtic	1995–96	Scottish Premier Division	32	0	4	0	3	0	4	0	43	0
Celtic	1996–97	Scottish Premier Division	27	0	6	0	1	0	3	0	37	0
Celtic	1997–98	Scottish Premier Division	5	0	0	0	1	0	4	0	10	0
Celtic	1998–99	Scottish Premier League	18	0	3	0	1	0	4	0	26	0
Celtic	1999–2000	Scottish Premier League	0	0	0	0	0	0	1	0	1	0
Celtic	Total		99	0	18	0	6	0	16	0	139	0
Stoke City (loan)	1997–98	First Division	3	0	0	0	0	0	–		3	0
Grasshopper Club Zürich	1999–2000	Nationalliga A	4	0	0	0	–		0	0	4	0
Kilmarnock	1999–2000	Scottish Premier League	15	0	0	0	1	0	–		16	0
Career Total			489	15	57	0	27	2	28	0	612	17

=== International ===
National team	Year	Apps	Goals
Scotland	1995	2	0
Scotland	1996	7	0
Scotland	1997	10	0
Scotland	1998	3	0
Total		22	0
