= Graham Harvey (footballer) =

Scottish footballer

Personal information
- Date of birth: 23 April 1961 (age 65)
- Place of birth: Musselburgh, Scotland
- Position: Forward

Senior career*
Years	Team	Apps	(Gls)
1982–1984	Hibernian	31	(3)
1984–1989	Dundee	125	(38)
1989–1992	Airdrieonians	56	(19)
1992–1995	Instant-Dict FC	?	(9)
1995–1998	Livingston	77	(33)
1998–1999	Bonnyrigg Rose		

International career
- Hong Kong League XI
- * Club domestic league appearances and goals

Graham Harvey (born 23 April 1961) is a Scottish former footballer. He played as a forward for teams including Hibernian, Dundee, Airdrieonians, Instant-Dict and Livingston.

== Playing career ==
Harvey started his career with Hibernian before signing for Dundee in 1984. Motherwell attempted to sign the striker in 1998, but he eventually signed for Airdrieonians the following year.

In 1992, he signed for Hong Kong side Instant-Dict FC.

After three years playing abroad, Harvey returned to Scotland to sign for Livingston in 1995.

He signed for Bonnyrigg Rose in 1998.

== Coaching career ==
After retiring from playing, Harvey became the assistant manager at Bonnyrigg Rose.
