= Rab Shannon =

Scottish footballer

Personal information
- Full name: Robert Shannon
- Date of birth: 20 April 1966 (age 60)
- Place of birth: Bellshill, Scotland
- Position: Defender

Senior career*
Years	Team	Apps	(Gls)
1982–1991	Dundee	227	(9)
1991	→ Middlesbrough (loan)	1	(0)
1991–1993	Dunfermline Athletic	69	(0)
1993–1995	Motherwell	67	(3)
1995–1996	Dundee United	35	(1)
1996–1998	Hibernian	6	(0)
1998–1999	Newcastle Breakers	27	(1)
1999–2001	East Fife	29	(0)

International career
1986–1988	Scotland U21	7	(1)

Managerial career
- 1999–2001: East Fife
- * Club domestic league appearances and goals

Robert 'Rab' Shannon (born 20 April 1966 in Bellshill) is a Scottish former footballer who played as a defender.

== Playing career ==
Shannon, who played for a number of Scottish clubs but spent around half his career with Dundee. He also spent a season with the Newcastle Breakers in the Australian National Soccer League.

== Management career ==
He managed East Fife between 1999 and 2000.

== See also ==
- Dundee United FC Season 1995-96
- Dundee United FC Season 1996-97
