= Stewart Forsyth =

Scottish footballer

Personal information
- Date of birth: 26 October 1961 (age 65)
- Place of birth: Inch, Scotland
- Position: Full back

Youth career
- Middlefield Boys Club

Senior career*
Years	Team	Apps	(Gls)
1979–1985	Arbroath	139	(3)
1985–1992	Dundee	194	(3)
1992–1993	Montrose	14	(1)
- Carnoustie Panmure
Total		347	(7)
- * Club domestic league appearances and goals

Stewart Forsyth (born 26 October 1961) is a Scottish footballer, who played for Arbroath, Dundee and Montrose.
