= 1988–89 Dumbarton F.C. season =

Dumbarton
1988–1989 season
- Manager: Bertie Auld/ Jim George
- Stadium: Boghead Park, Dumbarton
- Scottish League Division 2: 12th
- Scottish Cup: Third Round
- Scottish League Cup: Second Round
- Top goalscorer: League: Stuart MacIver (13); All: Stuart MacIver (16)
- Highest home attendance: 800
- Lowest home attendance: 341
- Average home league attendance: 490

Season 1988–89 was the 105th football season in which Dumbarton competed at a Scottish national level, entering the Scottish Football League for the 83rd time, the Scottish Cup for the 94th time and the Scottish League Cup for the 42nd time.

== Overview ==
Dumbarton's descent into the lower reaches of league football continued with a 12th-place finish—just two away from the bottom—their worst performance for over 50 years. The loss of Owen Coyle, a change in manager and a sizeable turnover in playing staff occurred during this period.

In the Scottish Cup, for the first time in many years, Dumbarton would start their campaign in the first round, and it would be two struggles to see off Highland League opposition, before Celtic were to prove too much in the third round.

In the League Cup, Premier Division St Mirren were to be the victors in the second round.

Locally, Dumbarton's grip on the Stirlingshire Cup was fairly easily released with a disappointing first round defeat by East Stirlingshire.

Finally, the friendly arranged with West Bromwich Albion was in celebration of the 'world championship' match between WBA and Renton in 1888, with Dumabrton winning the Renton Centenary Trophy after the 2–1 victory.

== Results and fixtures ==
Win Draw Loss

=== Scottish Second Division ===
13 August 1988 Second Division	Dumbarton	3–1	East Fife	Boghead Park
	Docherty 13', 43'; McQuade, J 73'		Pittman 46'	Attendance: 400; Referee: W Morrison

20 August 1988 Second Division	Stenhousemuir	3–1	Dumbarton	Ochilview Park
	Beaton 46' (pen.), 67'; Elliott 69'		Duncan 35'	Attendance: 477; Referee: J Herald

27 August 1988 Second Division	Dumbarton	0–3	Queen's Park	Boghead Park
			Crooks 9', 34'; Armstrong 64'	Attendance: 500; Referee: D Millar

3 September 1988 Second Division	Albion Rovers	2–1	Dumbarton	Cliftonhill Stadium
	Cougan 11'; Graham 55'		McQuade, J 26'	Attendance: 300; Referee: J Mackinnon

10 September 1988 Second Division	Dumbarton	0–2	Stranraer	Boghead Park
			Lloyd 15'; MacNiven 58'	Attendance: 450; Referee: J Renton

17 September 1988 Second Division	Brechin City	1–1	Dumbarton	Glebe Park, Brechin
	Firth 54'		Rooney 68'	Attendance: 430; Referee: J Duncan

24 September 1988 Second Division	Dumbarton	1–1	Alloa Athletic	Boghead Park
	Rooney 75'		Rutherford 51'	Attendance: 500; Referee: G Evans

1 October 1988 Second Division	Berwick Rangers	1–0	Dumbarton	Shielfield Park
	Douglas 30'			Attendance: 320; Referee: B McGinlay

8 October 1988 Second Division	Dumbarton	1–4	Arbroath	Boghead Park
	McGowan 19'		Fotheringham 17', 74'; Anderson 22'; Cairney (o.g.)	Attendance: 350; Referee: A Waddell

15 October 1988 Second Division	Dumbarton	1–2	Stirling Albion	Boghead Park
	MacIver 27'		Brogan 62', 74'	Attendance: 700; Referee: J McCluskey

22 October 1988 Second Division	Cowdenbeath	2–0	Dumbarton	Central Park, Cowdenbeath
	McGovern 29'; Hoggan 57'			Attendance: 350; Referee: K Hope

29 October 1988 Second Division	Dumbarton	3–0	East Stirling	Boghead Park
	Docherty 28' 61' (pen.); Duncan 80'			Attendance: 400; Referee: J Herald

5 November 1988 Second Division	Montrose	1–1	Dumbarton	Links Park
	Murray 29'		MacIver 70'	Attendance: 350; Referee: J McGillvray

12 November 1988 Second Division	Dumbarton	0–2	Stenhousemuir	Boghead Park
			Sexton 8', 88'	Attendance: 500; Referee: K Hope

19 November 1988 Second Division	East Fife	1–1	Dumbarton	Bayview Park, Methil
	Mitchell 46'		MacIver 39'	Attendance: 558; Referee: L Thow

26 November 1988 Second Division	Stranraer	2–2	Dumbarton	Stair Park
	Lloyd 41'; McMillan 48'		MacIver 6'; McCahill 66'	Attendance: 850; Referee: D Brooks

13 December 1988 Second Division	Dumbarton	0–2	Brechin City	Boghead Park
			Paterson 12', 24'	Attendance: 570; Referee: I Cathcart

17 December 1988 Second Division	Alloa Athletic	2–0	Dumbarton	Recreation Park, Alloa
	Blackie 70'; Lytwyn 81'			Attendance: 563; Referee: D Hope

24 December 1988 Second Division	Dumbarton	3–2	Montrose	Boghead Park
	Spence 41'; McQuade, J 56'; Doyle 70' (pen.)		McGlashan 25'; Maver 44'	Attendance: 400; Referee: D Yeats

31 December 1988 Second Division	East Stirling	0–1	Dumbarton	Firs Park
			McQuade, J 77'	Attendance: 250; Referee: R Paterson

3 January 1989 Second Division	Queen's Park	2–1	Dumbarton	Hampden Park
	Caven; Crooks		McQuade, J	Attendance: 832; Referee: R Tait

21 January 1989 Second Division	Stirling Albion	1–1	Dumbarton	Annfield Stadium
	Gibson 13'		Cairney 62'	Attendance: 620; Referee: A Roy

31 January 1989 Second Division	Dumbarton	3–0	Cowdenbeath	Boghead Park
	McQuade, A 14'; Docherty 80' (pen.); MacIver 90'			Attendance: 470; Referee: D McVicar

4 February 1989 Second Division	Arbroath	1–1	Dumbarton	Gayfield Park
	Stewart 54'		Docherty 88' (pen.)	Attendance: 404; Referee: G Evans

18 February 1989 Second Division	Dumbarton	4–0	East Fife	Boghead Park
	MacIver 44', 81'; Docherty (pen.); McQuade, J 73'			Attendance: 400; Referee: M McGinlay

25 February 1989 Second Division	Stranraer	1–1	Dumbarton	Stair Park
	McIntyre 30'		Quinn 85'	Attendance: 850; Referee: J Herald

4 March 1989 Second Division	Cowdenbeath	1–1	Dumbarton	Central Park, Cowdenbeath
	McGonigal 10'		MacIver 56'	Attendance: 300; Referee: J McCluskey

7 March 1989 Second Division	Dumbarton	2–2	Berwick Rangers	Boghead Park
	MacIver 37', 58'		Tait 8'; Hughes 77'	Attendance: 341; Referee: J Renton

11 March 1989 Second Division	Dumbarton	1–0	Queen's Park	Boghead Park
	Spence 10'			Attendance: 600; Referee: L Thow

25 March 1989 Second Division	East Stirling	1–0	Dumbarton	Firs Park
	Feeney 65'			Attendance: 300; Referee: J McGillvray

28 March 1989 Second Division	Dumbarton	2–0	Montrose	Boghead Park
	Wharton 26'; MacIver 88'			Attendance: 400; Referee: L Mottram

1 April 1989 Second Division	Stirling Albion	3–1	Dumbarton	Annfield Stadium
	Gibson 2'; Moore 9'; Tennant 20'		Spence 65'	Attendance: 634

4 April 1989 Second Division	Dumbarton	1–0	Albion Rovers	Boghead Park
	Robertson 50'			Attendance: 600; Referee: R Orr

8 April 1989 Second Division	Dumbarton	0–4	Berwick Rangers	Boghead Park
			Porteous 43' 82'; Callachan 46'; Hughes 77'	Attendance: 550; Referee: J McCluskey

15 April 1989 Second Division	Dumbarton	1–0	Brechin City	Boghead Park
	Quinn 25'			Attendance: 500; Referee: P Miller

22 April 1989 Second Division	Albion Rovers	2–0	Dumbarton	Cliftonhill Stadium
	Graham 42'; Chapman 67'			Attendance: 840; Referee: R Valentine

29 April 1989 Second Division	Arbroath	1–3	Dumbarton	Gayfield Park
	Stewart 71'		MacIver 25'; Quinn 74', 78'	Attendance: 347; Referee: B McGinlay

6 May 1989 Second Division	Dumbarton	2–0	Stenhousemuir	Boghead Park
	MacIver 9'; Douglas 84'			Attendance: 600; Referee: W Morrison

13 May 1989 Second Division	Dumbarton	0–2	Alloa Athletic	Boghead Park
			Lytwyn 75'; Gibson 80'	Attendance: 800; Referee: J Herald

=== Skol Cup ===
16 August 1988 League Cup round 2	Dumbarton	1–3 (a.e.t.)	St Mirren	Boghead Park
	McQuade, J 63'		Hamilton 21'; Chalmers 105'; McGarvey 116'	Attendance: 3,800; Referee: D McVicar

=== Scottish Cup ===
3 December 1988 Cup round 1	Inverness Thistle	0–0	Dumbarton	Kingsmills
				Attendance: 900; Referee: D Yeats

10 December 1988 Cup round 1R	Dumbarton	2–1	Inverness Thistle	Boghead Park
	Cairney 15'; MacIver		Christie 38'	Attendance: 1,000; Referee: D Yeats

7 January 1989 Cup round 2	Elgin City	2–2	Dumbarton	Borough Briggs
	McGinlay, D 1'; McGinlay, J 50'		McQuafde, J 23'; McGowan 89'	Attendance: 2,074; Referee: J McGillvray

14 January 1989 Cup round 2R	Dumbarton	4–0	Elgin City	Boghead Park
	Cairney 21'; MacIver (49\), 52'; McQuade, J 83'			Attendance: 1,000; Referee: J McGillvray

28 January 1989 Cup round 3	Celtic	2–0	Dumbarton	Celtic Park
	Walker 80'; Burns 84'			Attendance: 24,844

=== Stirlingshire Cup ===
18 April 1989 First Round	Dumbarton	0–2	East Stirlingshire	Boghead Park
			Laughlan 52'; Purdie

=== Renton Centenary Cup ===
6 August 1988	Dumbarton	2–1	(England) West Bromwich Albion	Boghead Park
	Coyle, O 65'; Rooney 85'		Goal	Attendance: 2,000

=== Pre-season and other matches ===
31 July 1988 Friendly	Dumbarton	1–0	Largs Thistle	Boghead Park
	McCahill

3 August 1988 Friendly	Dumbarton	0–3	Rangers XI	Boghead Park
			Goal

10 August 1988 Friendly	Dumbarton	2–1	Rangers XI	Boghead Park
	Goal		Goal

19 November 1988 Testimonial	Vale of Leven	1–1	Dumbarton	Millburn Park
	Howie		90'	Attendance: 300

== League table ==
Pos	Team	Pld	W	D	L	GF	GA	GD	Pts
10	Arbroath	39	11	15	13	56	63	−7	37
11	Stranraer	39	12	12	15	58	63	−5	36
12	Dumbarton	39	12	10	17	45	55	−10	34
13	Berwick Rangers	39	10	13	16	50	59	−9	33
14	Stenhousemuir	39	9	11	19	44	59	−15	29

Rules for classification: 1) points; 2) goal difference; 3) number of goals scored.

== Player statistics ==
=== Squad ===
No.	Pos	Nat	Player	Total		Second Division		League Cup		Scottish Cup	
No.	Pos	Nat	Player	Apps	Goals	Apps	Goals	Apps	Goals	Apps	Goals
	GK	(Scotland) SCO	Hugh Stevenson	18	0	16+0	0	1+0	0	1+0	0
	GK	(Scotland) SCO	Boyd Strachan	27	0	23+0	0	0+0	0	4+0	0
	DF	(Scotland) SCO	Willie Cairns	14	0	9+2	0	1+0	0	0+2	0
	DF	(Scotland) SCO	Dom Callan	6	0	4+1	0	1+0	0	0+0	0
	DF	(Scotland) SCO	Craig Cranmer	8	0	7+0	0	1+0	0	0+0	0
	DF	(Scotland) SCO	Gerry Doyle	26	0	16+6	0	1+0	0	3+0	0
	DF	(Scotland) SCO	Stevie Gow	24	0	16+4	0	0+0	0	4+0	0
	DF	(England) ENG	Peter Wharton	22	1	19+0	1	0+0	0	3+0	0
	MF	(Scotland) SCO	Pat Cairney	33	3	28+0	1	0+0	0	5+0	2
	MF	(Scotland) SCO	Owen Coyle	4	0	3+0	0	1+0	0	0+0	0
	MF	(Scotland) SCO	Gary Dickie	11	0	11+0	0	0+0	0	0+0	0
	MF	(Scotland) SCO	Robert Docherty	37	7	31+0	7	1+0	0	2+3	0
	MF	(Scotland) SCO	Craig Douglas	11	1	0+11	1	0+0	0	0+0	0
	MF	(Scotland) SCO	Gerry Doyle	17	1	11+3	1	0+0	0	3+0	0
	MF	(Scotland) SCO	Derek English	1	0	0+1	0	0+0	0	0+0	0
	MF	(Scotland) SCO	Dave Fulton	8	0	7+0	0	1+0	0	0+0	0
	MF	(Scotland) SCO	Dave Martin	9	0	8+0	0	1+0	0	0+0	0
	MF	(Scotland) SCO	Steve McCahill	27	1	21+0	1	1+0	0	5+0	0
	MF	(Scotland) SCO	Ian McDougall	6	0	4+1	0	0+1	0	0+0	0
	MF	(Scotland) SCO	Iain McKinley	1	0	1+0	0	0+0	0	0+0	0
	MF	(Scotland) SCO	Andy McQuade	19	1	18+0	1	0+0	0	1+0	0
	MF	(Scotland) SCO	Colin Spence	22	3	19+0	3	0+0	0	3+0	0
	FW	(Scotland) SCO	Billy Blackie	9	0	5+4	0	0+0	0	0+0	0
	FW	(Scotland) SCO	Graham Duncan	21	2	14+4	2	1+0	0	2+0	0
	FW	(Scotland) SCO	George Elliot	15	0	8+4	0	0+0	0	2+1	0
	FW	(Scotland) SCO	Stuart MacIver	32	16	27+0	13	0+0	0	5+0	3
	FW	(Scotland) SCO	Pat McGowan	39	2	34+0	1	0+0	0	5+0	1
	FW	(Scotland) SCO	John McQuade	40	8	26+8	5	0+1	1	5+0	2
	FW	(Scotland) SCO	Paul Quinn	15	4	15+0	4	0+0	0	0+0	0
	FW	(Scotland) SCO	Stuart Robertson	30	2	24+3	2	0+0	0	2+1	0
	FW	(Scotland) SCO	Benny Rooney	4	2	4+0	2	0+0	0	0+0	0

=== Transfers ===
==== Players in ====
Player	From	Date
(Scotland) Derek English	(Scotland) Duntocher BC	18 Jun 1988
(Scotland) John McQuade	(Scotland) Duntocher BC	18 Jun 1988
(Scotland) Dom Callan	(Scotland) Kilbowie Union	2 Jul 1988
(Scotland) Graham Duncan	(Scotland) Eadie Star	2 Jul 1988
(Scotland) Ian McDougall	(Scotland) Dalry Thistle	2 Jul 1988
(Scotland) Dave Fulton	(Scotland) Clydebank	13 Aug 1988
(Scotland) Craig Douglas	(Scotland) Balloch Juv	12 Oct 1988
(Scotland) George Elliot		12 Oct 1988
(Scotland) Pat Cairney	(Scotland) Petershill	21 Oct 1988
(Scotland) Stuart Robertson	(Scotland) Queen of the South	29 Oct 1988
(Scotland) Jamie Doyle	(Scotland) Partick Thistle	3 Dec 1988
(Scotland) Boyd Strachan	(Scotland) Yoker Athletic	9 Dec 1988
(Scotland) Colin Spence	(Scotland) Petershill	24 Dec 1988
(England) Peter Wharton	(Scotland) Pollok	6 Jan 1989
(Scotland) Andy McQuade	(Scotland) Pollok	4 Feb 1989
(Scotland) Paul Quinn	(Scotland) Clyde	12 Feb 1989
(Scotland) Gary Dickie	(Scotland) Petershill	25 Mar 1989

==== Players out ====
Player	To	Date
(Scotland) Gordon Arthur	(Scotland) Raith Rovers	17 May 1988
(Scotland) Peter Houston	(Scotland) Falkirk	13 Jun 1988
(Scotland) Gerry McCoy	(Scotland) Partick Thistle	2 Jul 1988
(Scotland) Jim Rooney	(Scotland) Clyde	6 Aug 1988
(Scotland) Ray Montgomerie	(Scotland) Kilmarnock	12 Aug 1988
(Scotland) Owen Coyle	(Scotland) Clydebank	17 Sep 1988
(Scotland) Dave Fulton		13 Oct 1988
(Scotland) Dave Martin	(Scotland) Queen of the South	29 Oct 1988
(Scotland) Billy Blackie	(Scotland) Alloa Athletic	25 Nov 1988
(Scotland) Steve McCahill	(Scotland) Celtic	1 Feb 1989
(Scotland) Ian McDougall	(Scotland) Pollok	
(Scotland) Iain McKinley	(Scotland) Yoker Athletic	
(Scotland) Donald McNeil	(Scotland) Renfrew	
(Scotland) Benny Rooney	(Scotland) Pollok	
(Scotland) Willie Cairns		
(Scotland) Dom Callan		
(Scotland) Mark Clougherty		
(Scotland) Craig Cranmer		
(Scotland) Gerry Doyle		
(Scotland) George Elliot		
(Scotland) Derek English		

== Reserve team ==
Dumbarton competed in the Scottish Reserve League (West), but withdrew after 18 games due to financial constraints.

== Trivia ==
- The League match against East Fife on 19 November marked Stuart MacIver's 100th appearance for Dumbarton in all national competitions—the 97th Dumbarton player to reach this milestone.
- Despite the previous season's relegation, manager Bertie Auld retained his position. However a poor start saw Auld replaced by Jim George seven games into the new season.

== See also ==
- 1988–89 in Scottish football
