= 1989–90 Dumbarton F.C. season =

Dumbarton
1989–1990 season
- Manager: Jim George
- Stadium: Boghead Park, Dumbarton
- Scottish League Division 2: 6th
- Scottish Cup: Second Round
- Scottish League Cup: Second Round
- Top goalscorer: League: Charlie Gibson (20); All: Charlie Gibson/ Stuart MacIver (21)
- Highest home attendance: 1,881
- Lowest home attendance: 300
- Average home league attendance: 600

Season 1989–90 was the 106th football season in which Dumbarton competed at a Scottish national level, entering the Scottish Football League for the 84th time, the Scottish Cup for the 95th time and the Scottish League Cup for the 43rd time.

== Overview ==
Dumbarton attempted to recover from the failures in the previous couple of seasons and splashed out on the signing of striker Charlie Gibson. There was an improvement in performances and by the beginning of December the club were 2nd in the league, but a combination of bad weather (which made the Boghead pitch unplayable for over 3 months) and bad discipline (resulting in suspensions of key players) meant that Dumbarton in the end had to settle for a 6th-place finish.

In the Scottish Cup, Dumbarton fell in the second round to fellow Second Division opponents Cowdenbeath.

In the League Cup, again it would be a second round exit, but there was no disgrace in the loss to Premier Division Celtic.

Locally, Dumbarton regained the Stirlingshire Cup with a final win over local rivals Clydebank.

== Results & fixtures ==
Win Draw Loss

=== Scottish Second Division ===
12 August 1989 Second Division	Dumbarton	2–1	Queen of the South	Boghead Park
	MacIver; Cairney		Andrews	Attendance: 650

19 August 1989 Second Division	Brechin City	4–0	Dumbarton	Glebe Park, Brechin
	Brash 7'; Sexton Hill; Pride			Attendance: 500; Referee: R Morrison

26 August 1989 Second Division	East Stirling	1–2	Dumbarton	Firs Park
	Grant 29'		McQuade 24' (pen.); MacIver 39'	Attendance: 200; Referee: I Mottram

2 September 1989 Second Division	Dumbarton	1–5	Berwick Rangers	Boghead Park
	Spence 37'		Porteous 4', 22'; Thorpe 25', 29', 42'	Attendance: 550; Referee: D Yeats

9 September 1989 Second Division	Dumbarton	5–2	Stranraer	Boghead Park
	Gibson 25'; Cairney 26'; MacIver 30', 33'; Doyle		Duncan 51'	Attendance: 500; Referee: B McGinlay

16 September 1989 Second Division	East Fife	2–2	Dumbarton	Bayview Park, Methil
	Lennox; Brown		McQuade; Gibson	Attendance: 624; Referee: J McGillvray

23 September 1989 Second Division	Dumbarton	2–2	Stirling Albion	Boghead Park
	Gibson; Reid		Reid 11'; Conway	Attendance: 800

30 September 1989 Second Division	Cowdenbeath	1–5	Dumbarton	Central Park, Cowdenbeath
	MacKenzie		Gibson; MacIver; Spence	Attendance: 250

7 October 1989 Second Division	Arbroath	2–1	Dumbarton	Gayfield Park
	Brand 39'		Gibson 56'	Attendance: 611; Referee: J Duncan

14 October 1989 Second Division	Dumbarton	2–1	Queen's Park	Boghead Park
	Gibson 65'; Spence 81'		Caven 47'	Attendance: 700; Referee: J Herald

21 October 1989 Second Division	Dumbarton	1–0	Stenhousemuir	Boghead Park
	Gibson 89'			Attendance: 348; Referee: G Evans

28 October 1989 Second Division	Kilmarnock	3–0	Dumbarton	Rugby Park
	Watters 60', 65'; Tait 89'			Attendance: 2,867; Referee: W Crombie

4 November 1989 Second Division	Dumbarton	3–2	Montrose	Boghead Park
	Gibson 32', 75'; McQuade, A 80'		Paterson 4'; McGlashan 6'	Attendance: 400; Referee: J McKinnon

11 November 1989 Second Division	Berwick Rangers	1–2	Dumbarton	Shielfield Park
	Hughes 1'		Quinn 32'; Gibson 58'	Attendance: 487; Referee: G Smith

18 November 1989 Second Division	Dumbarton	2–2	Cowdenbeath	Boghead Park
	MacIver 70', 86'		MacKenzie 23'; Spence	Attendance: 500

25 November 1989 Second Division	Stirling Albion	4–1	Dumbarton	Annfield Stadium
	Reid 53'; Lloyd 66'; Lawrie 70'; Walker		Hughes 45'	Attendance: 570; Referee: L Thow

2 December 1989 Second Division	Dumbarton	0–0	Arbroath	Boghead Park
				Attendance: 450

16 December 1989 Second Division	Queen's Park	2–2	Dumbarton	Hampden Park
	O'Brien 24'; Rodden 48'		Gibson; MacIver 70'	Attendance: 587

23 December 1989 Second Division	Dumbarton	1–1	Brechin City	Boghead Park
	Spence 44'		Sexton 80'	Attendance: 700

6 January 1990 Second Division	Montrose	2–2	Dumbarton	Links Park
	Powell 58'; McGlashan 71'		Hughes 52'; MacIver 78'	Attendance: 300; Referee: G Smith

10 January 1990 Second Division	Queen of the South	1–4	Dumbarton	Palmerston Park
	Gordon		MacIver; Andrews (o.g.); Gibson	Attendance: 923

13 January 1990 Second Division	Stranraer	4–4	Dumbarton	Stair Park
	Henderson 49'; McNiven 47'; Ewing 86'		Hughes 2' (pen.); MacIver; McQuade; Spence	Attendance: 400; Referee: R Paterson

27 January 1990 Second Division	Stenhousemuir	4–3	Dumbarton	Ochilview Park
	Nelson 15'; McCormick 18'; Speirs; Kemp 65'		Milligan 33' (o.g.); Hughes 41' (pen.); MacIver 89'	Attendance: 500; Referee: J McKinnell

10 February 1990 Second Division	Queen of the South	1–1	Dumbarton	Palmerston Park
	Sloan 61'		MacIver 59'	Attendance: 822; Referee: R Morrison

14 March 1990 Second Division	East Fife	3–1	Dumbarton	Bayview Park, Methil
	Wilson 33', 76'; Crolla 60'		MacIver 88'	Attendance: 609

17 March 1990 Second Division	Brechin City	3–0	Dumbarton	Glebe Park, Brechin
	Lees 20'; Paterson 22'			Attendance: 600; Referee: J Renton

20 March 1990 Second Division	Dumbarton	3–0	East Stirling	Boghead Park
	Quinn 25'; Hughes 71', 79'			Attendance: 500

24 March 1990 Second Division	Dumbarton	0–2	Kilmarnock	Boghead Park
			Sludden 62'; Tait 84'	Attendance: 1,881; Referee: D Brooks

27 March 1990 Second Division	Montrose	1–2	Dumbarton	Links Park
	McGlashan 67'		Morrison 55'; McQuade 75'	Attendance: 350

31 March 1990 Second Division	Berwick Rangers	3–2	Dumbarton	Shielfield Park
	Sloan 23'; Bickmore 32'; Tait 72'		Gibson 41'; Boyd 76'	Attendance: 436; Referee: J Duncan

3 April 1990 Second Division	Dumbarton	1–3	Kilmarnock	Boghead Park
	Gibson 5'		Sludden 9'; Watters 28', 56'	Attendance: 1,000

7 April 1990 Second Division	Stenhousemuir	1–3	Dumbarton	Ochilview Park
	Nelson 7'		Hughes 41'; Gibson 48'; MacIver 87'	Attendance: 600; Referee: D Syme

10 April 1990 Second Division	Dumbarton	1–1	Stranraer	Boghead Park
	Morrison 62' (pen.)		Harkness 40'	Attendance: 300

14 April 1990 Second Division	Dumbarton	1–3	Cowdenbeath	Boghead Park
	Gibson 88'		Ross 8', 65'; Buckley 90'	Attendance: 400

17 April 1990 Second Division	Dumbarton	2–1	East Stirling	Boghead Park
	Gibson 16', 17'		Byrne 85'	Attendance: 300

21 April 1990 Second Division	Dumbarton	3–1	East Fife	Boghead Park
	MacIver 18'; Morrison 25' (pen.), 85' (pen.)		Bell 55'	Attendance: 500

24 April 1990 Second Division	Dumbarton	2–0	Arbroath	Boghead Park
	Boyd 6'; MacIver 26'			Attendance: 450

28 April 1990 Second Division	Dumbarton	1–2	Stirling Albion	Boghead Park
	MacIver 87'		Moore 29'; George 85'	Attendance: 600; Referee: W Crombie

5 May 1990 Second Division	Queen's Park	1–0	Dumbarton	Hampden Park
	Mackenzie 75'			Attendance: 586; Referee: I Mottram

=== Skol Cup ===
8 August 1989 League Cup round 1	Dumbarton	3–0	Stenhousemuir	Boghead Park
	MacIver; Gibson			Attendance: 569

15 August 1989 League Cup round 2	Dumbarton	0–3	Celtic	Boghead Park
			Burns; McStay; Dziekanowski	Attendance: 8,500

=== Tennant's Scottish Cup ===
9 December 1989 Cup round 1	Queen's Park	1–2	Dumbarton	Hampden Park
	Rodden 47'		McQuade 29'; Quinn 84'	Attendance: 784; Referee: L Thow

30 December 1989 Cup round 2	Dumbarton	0–2	Cowdenbeath	Boghead Park
			Ross 45', 53'	Attendance: 700

=== Stirlingshire Cup ===
17 October 1989 First Round	Alloa Athletic	0–3	Dumbarton	Recreation Park, Alloa
			Meechan; Wharton; Quinn

1 May 1990 Semi Final	Stenhousemuir	1–3	Dumbarton	Ochilview Park
	Nelson 32'		Maciver 41'; McQuade 80'; Gibson 90'

7 May 1990 Final	Clydebank	2–4	Dumbarton	Kilbowie Park
	Davies 8'; Ferguson 15'		McQuade, J 36'; McGinlay 43', 61', 73'

=== Pre-season matches ===
29 July 1989 Friendly	Kilbirnie Ladeside	2–1	Dumbarton	Kilbirnie
	Pelini 19'; McLaughlin 40'		Spence 89'	Referee: H Stevenson

31 July 1989 Friendly	Dumbarton	2–1	Celtic XI	Boghead Park
	Trialist 29'; Spence 37'		Crainey 78'

3 August 1989 Friendly	Renfrew	0–3	Dumbarton	Renfrew
			Wharton; MacIver; Docherty

6 August 1989 Friendly	Vale of Leven	4–1	Dumbarton	Millburn Park
	McGorm; Meechan; Jones		Gibson

== League table ==
Pos	Team	Pld	W	D	L	GF	GA	GD	Pts
4	Stenhousemuir	39	18	9	12	62	53	+9	45
5	Berwick Rangers	39	18	5	16	66	57	+9	41
6	Dumbarton	39	15	10	14	70	73	−3	40
7	Cowdenbeath	39	13	13	13	58	54	+4	39
8	Stranraer	39	15	8	16	57	59	−2	38

Source: "1989-1990 Second Division - SPFL Archive". SPFL.
Rules for classification: 1) points; 2) goal difference; 3) number of goals scored.

== Player statistics ==
=== Squad ===
No.	Pos	Nat	Player	Total		Second Division		League Cup		Scottish Cup	
No.	Pos	Nat	Player	Apps	Goals	Apps	Goals	Apps	Goals	Apps	Goals
	GK	(Scotland) SCO	Hugh Stevenson	13	0	11+0	0	0+0	0	2+0	0
	GK	(Scotland) SCO	Boyd Strachan	30	0	28+0	0	2+0	0	0+0	0
	DF	(Scotland) SCO	John Boyd	16	2	16+0	2	0+0	0	0+0	0
	DF	(Scotland) SCO	Stevie Gow	12	0	11+1	0	0+0	0	0+0	0
	DF	(England) ENG	Peter Wharton	28	0	19+5	0	2+0	0	2+0	0
	MF	(Scotland) SCO	Pat Cairney	23	2	18+1	2	2+0	0	2+0	0
	MF	(Scotland) SCO	Jim Dempsey	31	0	29+0	0	0+0	0	2+0	0
	MF	(Scotland) SCO	Gary Dickie	21	0	14+5	0	2+0	0	0+0	0
	MF	(Scotland) SCO	Jamie Doyle	21	1	18+3	1	0+0	0	0+0	0
	MF	(Scotland) SCO	Bernie Grant	8	0	7+0	0	1+0	0	0+0	0
	MF	(Scotland) SCO	Jim Hughes	27	7	24+1	7	0+0	0	2+0	0
	MF	(Scotland) SCO	Jim McGinlay	1	0	1+0	0	0+0	0	0+0	0
	MF	(Scotland) SCO	Andy McQuade	42	2	38+0	2	2+0	0	2+0	0
	MF	(Scotland) SCO	Jim Meechan	15	0	12+1	0	2+0	0	0+0	0
	MF	(Scotland) SCO	Steve Morrison	17	4	17+0	4	0+0	0	0+0	0
	MF	(Scotland) SCO	Colin Spence	42	5	38+0	5	2+0	0	2+0	0
	MF	(Scotland) SCO	Gregor Stevens	10	0	8+0	0	0+0	0	2+0	0
	FW	(Scotland) SCO	Charlie Gibson	40	21	36+0	20	2+0	1	2+0	0
	FW	(Scotland) SCO	Stuart MacIver	38	21	32+2	19	2+0	2	2+0	0
	FW	(Scotland) SCO	Paul McGrogan	7	0	3+3	0	0+1	0	0+0	0
	FW	(Scotland) SCO	John McQuade	19	4	8+8	3	2+0	0	1+0	1
	FW	(Scotland) SCO	Paul Quinn	31	3	17+11	2	0+1	0	1+1	1
	FW	(Scotland) SCO	Billy Reid	30	1	23+6	1	1+0	0	0+0	0
	FW	(Scotland) SCO	David Wilson	1	0	1+0	0	0+0	0	0+0	0

=== Transfers ===
==== Players in ====
Player	From	Date
(Scotland) Charlie Gibson	(Scotland) Stirling Albion	9 Jun 1989
(Scotland) Bernie Grant	(Scotland) Kilbirnie Ladeside	17 Jun 1989
(Scotland) Jim Meechan	(Scotland) St Mirren	17 Jun 1989
(Scotland) Paul McGrogan	(Scotland) Vale of Leven	8 Aug 1989
(Scotland) Billy Reid	(Scotland) Shotts Bon Accord	13 Aug 1989
(Scotland) Jim Hughes	(Scotland) Clydebank	3 Nov 1989
(Scotland) Gregor Stevens	(Scotland) Brechin City	4 Nov 1989
(Scotland) Jim Dempsey	(Scotland) Partick Thistle	10 Nov 1989
(Scotland) John Boyd	(Scotland) Greenock	14 Nov 1989
(Scotland) Jim McGinlay	(Scotland) Partick Thistle	25 Nov 1989
(Scotland) Steve Morrison	(Scotland) Hamilton	26 Jan 1990
(Scotland) Steve Marshall	(Scotland) Kilmarnock	19 Mar 1990
(Scotland) David Wilson		28 Apr 1990

==== Players out ====
Player	To	Date
(Scotland) Stuart Robertson	(Scotland) Stirling Albion	9 Jun 1989
(Scotland) Graham Duncan	(Scotland) Stranraer	30 Jun 1989
(Scotland) Robert Docherty	(Scotland) Stirling Albion	9 Aug 1989
(Scotland) Pat Cairney	(Scotland) Arthurlie	
(Scotland) Craig Douglas	(Scotland) Neilston	
(Scotland) Andy McQuade	(Scotland) Pollok	
(England) Peter Wharton	(Scotland) Bathgate Thistle	
(Scotland) Gregor Stevens		
(Scotland) Gary Dickie		
(Scotland) Jamie Doyle		
(Scotland) Pat McGowan		
(Scotland) Jim Meechan		
(Scotland) Billy Reid		

== Reserve team ==
Dumbarton competed in the Scottish Reserve League (West), and with 11 wins and 3 draws from 28 games, finished 12th of 15.

In the Reserve League Cup, Dumbarton lost out to Partick Thistle in the first round.

== Trivia ==
- The £50,000 fee paid by Dumbarton to Stirling Albion for Charlie Gibson was a record in fees paid.
- The slight improvement in fortunes would not, however, be enough to save manager Jim George's position and with 3 games to go in the league, he was sacked, to make way for Billy Lamont's second stint at the job.

== See also ==
- 1989–90 in Scottish football
