= 1987–88 Dumbarton F.C. season =

Dumbarton
1987–1988 season
- Manager: Mark Clougherty
- Stadium: Boghead Park, Dumbarton
- Scottish League Division 1: 12th
- Scottish Cup: Third Round
- Scottish League Cup: Third Round
- Top goalscorer: League: Owen Coyle (14); All: Owen Coyle (14)
- Highest home attendance: 1,283
- Lowest home attendance: 700
- Average home league attendance: 850

Season 1987–88 was the 104th football season in which Dumbarton competed at a Scottish national level, entering the Scottish Football League for the 82nd time, the Scottish Cup for the 93rd time and the Scottish League Cup for the 41st time.

== Overview ==
Following two promotion challenging seasons, Dumbarton inexplicably sank to the bottom of the First Division and were relegated to the third tier of Scottish league football. With the loss of Sir Hugh Fraser, finances at the club were tight, and with this in mind it was decided to appoint Mark Clougherty as player/manager. However results were generally poor and the board sacked Clougherty in January. In his place Bertie Auld was appointed and despite a spirited draw against Hibernian in the Cup, a winless run of 11 games would ensure the club's drop into bottom place in the league - a place they would occupy even though Dumbarton were unbeaten in their last four games.

In the Scottish Cup, another third round exit was Dumbarton's fate, although this would be after a draw against Premier Division opponents Hibernian.

In the League Cup, for the second year in a row Celtic were Dumbarton's third round opponents, and it would be the Premier Division side that would ease through to the next round.

Locally however, Dumbarton regained the Stirlingshire Cup, with a final victory over Stirling Albion.

== Results & fixtures ==
Win Draw Loss

=== Scottish First Division ===
8 August 1987 First Division	Clyde	5–0	Dumbarton	Shawfield Stadium
	Buchanan 13' (pen.); Henderson 28'; Mailer 30'; McGlashan 51'; Walker 67'			Attendance: 1,000; Referee: K O'Donnell

11 August 1987 First Division	Dumbarton	2–3	Meadowbank Thistle	Boghead Park
	Martin 41'; MacIver 43'		Park; McGachie	Attendance: 740; Referee: G Cumming

15 August 1987 First Division	Dumbarton	1–3	Kilmarnock	Boghead Park
	Martin 33'		Harkness 46'; McInnes 56'; Cuthbertson 81'	Attendance: 800; Referee: M McGinley

22 August 1987 First Division	Airdrie	0–1	Dumbarton	Broomfield Park
			Coyle, O 53' (pen.)	Attendance: 1,200; Referee: J Renton

29 August 1987 First Division	Dumbarton	1–1	Clydebank	Boghead Park
	Rooney, B 55'		Conroy 12'	Attendance: 800; Referee: A Ferguson

5 September 1987 First Division	Hamilton	2–1	Dumbarton	Douglas Park
	Caughey 16', 28'		Houston 29'	Attendance: 1,765; Referee: A Waddell

12 September 1987 First Division	Dumbarton	1–1	Forfar Athletic	Boghead Park
	Rooney 44'		Blackie 13'	Attendance: 700; Referee: D McVicar

15 September 1987 First Division	Partick Thistle	1–2	Dumbarton	Firhill Park
	Kelly 19'		Rooney, J 29'; Coyle, O 82' (pen.)	Attendance: 1,140; Referee: M McGinley

19 September 1987 First Division	East Fife	1–2	Dumbarton	Bayview Park, Methil
	Perry 61' (pen.)		McGowan 16'; Kay 44'	Attendance: 619; Referee: A Huett

26 September 1987 First Division	Dumbarton	2–2	Queen of the South	Boghead Park
	Coyle, O 5'; Houston 89'		Mackin 27'; Hughes 85'	Attendance: 700; Referee: M Gould

29 September 1987 First Division	Raith Rovers	4–1	Dumbarton	Starks Park
	Harris 13' (pen.) 62'; Dalziel 78' 88'		Houston 84'	Attendance: 1,730; Referee: C Sinclair

3 October 1987 First Division	Dumbarton	1–1	Clyde	Boghead Park
	McCahill 78'		McGlashan 69'	Attendance: 1,200; Referee: K Hope

7 October 1987 First Division	Meadowbank Thistle	0–0	Dumbarton	Meadowbank Stadium
				Attendance: 650; Referee: D Millar

10 October 1987 First Division	Dumbarton	0–0	Airdrie	Boghead Park
				Attendance: 1,200; Referee: H Gould

17 October 1987 First Division	Forfar Athletic	0–2	Dumbarton	Station Park, Forfar
			Coyle, O 18'; McCoy 85'	Attendance: 671; Referee: R Valentine

20 October 1987 First Division	Dumbarton	4–2	Partick Thistle	Boghead Park
	Coyle, O 24' (pen.), 66'; MacIver 72'; McCoy 90'		McDonald 30'; Scrimgeour 73'	Attendance: 800; Referee: G Smith

24 October 1987 First Division	Kilmarnock	1–0	Dumbarton	Rugby Park
	Gilmour 89'			Attendance: 1,571; Referee: W Morrison

27 October 1987 First Division	Dumbarton	1–3	Raith Rovers	Boghead Park
	Coyle, O 31' (pen.)		Dalziel 14'; Harris 60'; Wright 89'	Attendance: 700; Referee: R Paterson

31 October 1987 First Division	Dumbarton	2–1	Hamilton	Boghead Park
	Coyle, O 26' (pen.); McCoy 41'		Montgomerie 3' (o.g.)	Attendance: 900; Referee: M McGinley

7 November 1987 First Division	Clydebank	3–1	Dumbarton	Kilbowie Park
	Conroy 9'; Charnley 45' 60'		McGowan 42'	Attendance: 1,431; Referee: P Hanley

14 November 1987 First Division	Dumbarton	1–1	East Fife	Boghead Park
	MacIver 70'		Hunter 12'	Attendance: 600; Referee: A Evans

21 November 1987 First Division	Queen of the South	2–0	Dumbarton	Palmerston Park
	Reid 44'; Moore 89'			Attendance: 1,100; Referee: A Hewitt

28 November 1987 First Division	Clyde	3–4	Dumbarton	Shawfield Stadium
	Mailer 26'; McGlashan 32', 44'		Docherty 33', 59'; Coyle, O 47'; MacIver 51'	Attendance: 800; Referee: J Renton

5 December 1987 First Division	Dumbarton	0–1	Meadowbank Thistle	Boghead Park
			McGonigal 64'	Attendance: 500; Referee: I Cathcart

12 December 1987 First Division	Dumbarton	0–1	Forfar Athletic	Boghead Park
			Blackie 87'	Attendance: 507; Referee: G Smith

19 December 1987 First Division	Partick Thistle	1–3	Dumbarton	Firhill Park
	Gallagher 79'		McNeil 12'; Docherty 39'; Coyle, O 48' (pen.)	Attendance: 1,407; Referee: D Hope

26 December 1987 First Division	Hamilton	2–0	Dumbarton	Douglas Park
	Gordon 54'; Fairlie 84'			Attendance: 1,250; Referee: J McCluskey

2 January 1988 First Division	Dumbarton	1–3	Clydebank	Boghead Park
	38' (o.g.)		Traynor 48' (pen.); Irons 57'; Charnley 83'	Attendance: 1,200; Referee: D McVicar

9 January 1988 First Division	East Fife	3–4	Dumbarton	Bayview Park, Methil
	Hunter 59'; Conroy 64' (pen.); Scott 90'		McCoy 5', 43'; Coyle, O 79'; McGowan, P 82'	Attendance: 615; Referee: D Syme

16 January 1988 First Division	Dumbarton	0–2	Queen of the South	Boghead Park
			Moore 57'; Bain 75'	Attendance: 800; Referee: A Roy

23 January 1988 First Division	Dumbarton	1–0	Kilmarnock	Boghead Park
	Rooney, J 42'			Attendance: 950; Referee: T Muirhead

6 February 1988 First Division	Airdrie	1–1	Dumbarton	Broomfield Park
	McCabe 12'		McCoy 35'	Attendance: 1,150; Referee: D Millar

13 February 1988 First Division	Raith Rovers	1–1	Dumbarton	Starks Park
	Lloyd 47'		McLeod 20' (o.g.)	Attendance: 1,802; Referee: D McVicar

27 February 1988 First Division	Dumbarton	0–1	Clyde	Boghead Park
			Willock 80'	Attendance: 750; Referee: A Ferguson

5 March 1988 First Division	Forfar Athletic	4–0	Dumbarton	Station Park, Forfar
	Ward 33'; MacDonald 66'; Lorimer 84'; Brown 86'			Attendance: 397; Referee: A Roy

19 March 1988 First Division	Dumbarton	1–1	Hamilton	Boghead Park
	McCoy 31'		Harris 47' (pen.)	Attendance: 1,283; Referee: J Renton

22 March 1988 First Division	Dumbarton	1–2	Partick Thistle	Boghead Park
	Coyle, O 78'		McNaught 41' (pen.); Gallagher 47'	Attendance: 925; Referee: T Muirhead

26 March 1988 First Division	Clydebank	1–0	Dumbarton	Kilbowie Park
	Bryce 88'			Attendance: 1,088; Referee: R Orr

2 April 1988 First Division	Dumbarton	0–1	Airdrie	Boghead Park
			Campbell 34'	Attendance: 800; Referee: J Duncan

9 April 1988 First Division	Kilmarnock	3–1	Dumbarton	Rugby Park
	Gilmour 49'; McGuire 65'; Bryson 70'		McCoy 84'	Attendance: 2,205; Referee: G Evans

16 April 1988 First Division	Queen of the South	0–0	Dumbarton	Palmerston Park
				Attendance: 1,100; Referee: D Yeats

23 April 1988 First Division	Dumbarton	0–0	East Fife	Boghead Park
				Attendance: 700; Referee: A Ferguson

30 April 1988 First Division	Meadowbank Thistle	2–4	Dumbarton	Meadowbank Stadium
	Armstrong 66'; Roseburgh 89'		McCabe 31'; Coyle, O 48'; McGowan, P 56'; Docherty 69'	Attendance: 600; Referee: J McCluskey

7 May 1988 First Division	Dumbarton	3–0	Raith Rovers	Boghead Park
	Rooney 24'; Coyle, O 40'; Docherty 70'			Attendance: 800; Referee: R Morrison

=== Skol Cup ===
19 August 1987 League Cup round 2	Ayr United	0–1	Dumbarton	Somerset Park
			McNeil 53'	Attendance: 2,428; Referee: J McCluskey

26 August 1987 League Cup round 3	Dumbarton	1–5	Celtic	Boghead Park
	Martin 76'		Burns 28'; Stark 38', 79'; Walker 63'; McGhee 78'	Attendance: 9,429; Referee: G McGilvray

=== Scottish Cup ===
30 January 1988 Cup round 3	Dumbarton	0–0	Hibernian	Boghead Park
				Attendance: 7,000; Referee: G Evans

2 February 1988 Cup round 3R	Hibernian	3–0	Dumbarton	Easter Road
	Docherty 37' (o.g.); Tortolano 69'; Orr 80'			Attendance: 8,000; Referee: G Evans

=== Stirlingshire Cup ===
13 October 1987 First Round	Stenhousemuir	3–3 (3-4 p)	Dumbarton	Ochilview Park
	Condie 10'; Walker 70'; Sexton 71'		Maciver 16' 31'; Bell 81'

26 April 1988 Semi Final	Dumbarton	2–0	Alloa Athletic	Boghead Park
	Goal

30 May 1988 Final	Stirling Albion	1–2	Dumbarton	Annfield Stadium
	Goal		McCahill; Docherty

=== Pre-season matches ===
3 August 1987 Friendly	Dumbarton	1–1	(England) Southampton	Boghead Park
	McNeil		Clarke 8' (pen.)	Attendance: 500; Referee: M McGinlay

5 August 1987 Friendly	Dumbarton	1–2	Celtic	Boghead Park
	Coyle, O (pen.)		McGhee 30'; McCarrison 45'

== League table ==
Pos	Team	Pld	W	D	L	GF	GA	GD	Pts	Promotion or relegation
8	Partick Thistle	44	16	9	19	60	64	−4	41	
9	Clyde	44	16	6	22	73	75	−2	38	
10	Kilmarnock	44	13	11	20	55	60	−5	37	
11	East Fife (R)	44	13	10	21	61	76	−15	36	Relegation to the Second Division
12	Dumbarton (R)	44	12	12	20	51	70	−19	36	Relegation to the Second Division

Source: RSSSF and statto
Rules for classification: 1) points; 2) goal difference; 3) number of goals scored.
(R) Relegated

== Player statistics ==
=== Squad ===
No.	Pos	Nat	Player	Total		First Division		League Cup		Scottish Cup	
No.	Pos	Nat	Player	Apps	Goals	Apps	Goals	Apps	Goals	Apps	Goals
	GK	(Scotland) SCO	Gordon Arthur	44	0	40+0	0	2+0	0	2+0	0
	GK	(Scotland) SCO	Hugh Stevenson	4	0	4+0	0	0+0	0	0+0	0
	DF	(Scotland) SCO	Willie Cairns	18	0	16+0	0	0+0	0	2+0	0
	DF	(Scotland) SCO	Craig Cranmer	22	0	18+2	0	0+0	0	2+0	0
	DF	(Scotland) SCO	Gerry Doyle	6	0	4+2	0	0+0	0	0+0	0
	DF	(Scotland) SCO	Stevie Gow	4	0	1+1	0	0+2	0	0+0	0
	DF	(Scotland) SCO	Ray Montgomerie	35	0	31+0	0	2+0	0	2+0	0
	MF	(Scotland) SCO	Joe Carson	3	0	2+1	0	0+0	0	0+0	0
	MF	(Scotland) SCO	Mark Clougherty	4	0	4+0	0	0+0	0	0+0	0
	MF	(Scotland) SCO	Owen Coyle	45	14	38+3	14	2+0	0	2+0	0
	MF	(Scotland) SCO	Tommy Coyle	1	0	0+1	0	0+0	0	0+0	0
	MF	(Scotland) SCO	Jim Creaney	4	0	2+2	0	0+0	0	0+0	0
	MF	(Scotland) SCO	Robert Docherty	23	5	19+2	5	0+0	0	2+0	0
	MF	(Scotland) SCO	Alan Kay	21	1	18+3	1	0+0	0	0+0	0
	MF	(Scotland) SCO	Dave Martin	46	3	42+0	2	2+0	1	2+0	0
	MF	(Scotland) SCO	Gerry McCabe	6	1	5+1	1	0+0	0	0+0	0
	MF	(Scotland) SCO	Steve McCahill	46	1	41+1	1	2+0	0	2+0	0
	MF	(Scotland) SCO	Donald McNeil	26	2	24+0	1	2+0	1	0+0	0
	MF	(Scotland) SCO	Jim McNeil	16	0	4+10	0	2+0	0	0+0	0
	MF	(Scotland) SCO	Jim Rooney	46	4	42+0	4	2+0	0	2+0	0
	FW	(Scotland) SCO	Jimmy Bell	1	0	0+1	0	0+0	0	0+0	0
	FW	(Scotland) SCO	Billy Blackie	4	0	4+0	0	0+0	0	0+0	0
	FW	(Scotland) SCO	Peter Houston	46	3	37+5	3	2+0	0	2+0	0
	FW	(Scotland) SCO	Stuart MacIver	26	4	12+12	4	1+0	0	0+1	0
	FW	(Scotland) SCO	Gerry McCoy	32	8	30+0	8	0+0	0	2+0	0
	FW	(Scotland) SCO	Pat McGowan	45	4	39+2	4	2+0	0	0+2	0
	FW	(Scotland) SCO	Dougie McGuire	3	0	3+0	0	0+0	0	0+0	0
	FW	(Scotland) SCO	Benny Rooney	15	1	4+9	1	1+1	0	0+0	0

=== Transfers ===
==== Players in ====
Player	From	Date
(Scotland) Craig Cranmer	(Scotland) Belhaven Athletic	27 Jun 1987
(Scotland) Benny Rooney	(Scotland) Petershill	27 Jun 1987
(Scotland) Jimmy Bell	(Scotland) Kilbowie Union	23 Jul 1987
(Scotland) Stevie Gow	(Scotland) Dumbarton United	23 Jul 1987
(Scotland) Iain McKinley	(Scotland) Duntocher BC	23 Jul 1987
(Scotland) Robert Docherty	(Scotland) Hamilton	1 Nov 1987
(Scotland) Jim Creaney	(Scotland) Stranraer (loan)	14 Nov 1987
(Scotland) Willie Cairns	(Scotland) Partick Thistle	9 Jan 1988
(Scotland) Dougie McGuire	(Scotland) Celtic (loan)	13 Feb 1988
(Scotland) Gerry Doyle	(Scotland) Stranraer	26 Feb 1988
(Scotland) Joe Carson	(Scotland) Stranraer	12 Mar 1988
(Scotland) Billy Blackie	(Scotland) Forfar Athletic	9 Apr 1988
(Scotland) Gerry McCabe	(Scotland) Hamilton (loan)	9 Apr 1988

==== Players out ====
Player	To	Date
(Scotland) Jackie Rafferty	(Scotland) Partick Thistle	13 Jun 1987
(Scotland) Danny Docherty	(Scotland) Queen of the South	1 Aug 1987
(Scotland) Tommy Coyle	(Scotland) St Johnstone	22 Aug 1987
(Scotland) Arthur Grant	(Scotland) East Stirling	28 Nov 1987
(Scotland) Joe Carson	(Scotland) Vale of Leven	
(Scotland) Alan Kay		
(Scotland) Jimmy Bell		
(Scotland) Jim McNeil		
(Scotland) Billy Traynor		

== Reserve team ==
Dumbarton competed in the Scottish Reserve League (West), winning 11 and drawing 11 of 33 games.

== Trivia ==
- The League match against Clydebank on 29 August marked Owen Coyle's 100th appearance for Dumbarton in all national competitions - the 93rd Dumbarton player to reach this milestone.
- The League match against Forfar Athletic on 12 September marked Donald McNeil's 300th appearance for Dumbarton in all national competitions - the 6th Dumbarton player to achieve this accolade.
- The League match against Forfar Athletic on 12 September also marked Steve McCahill's 100th appearance for Dumbarton in all national competitions - the 94th Dumbarton player to reach this milestone.
- The League match against Queen of the South on 26 September marked Pat McGowan's 200th appearance for Dumbarton in all national competitions - the 20th Dumbarton player to break the 'double century'.
- The League match against East Fife on 14 November marked Alan Kay's 100th appearance for Dumbarton in all national competitions - the 95th Dumbarton player to reach this milestone.
- The League match against Raith Rovers on 13 February marked Gerry McCoy's 100th appearance for Dumbarton in all national competitions - the 96th Dumbarton player to reach this milestone.

== See also ==
- 1987–88 in Scottish football
