= 1991–92 Dumbarton F.C. season =

Dumbarton
1991–1992 season
- Manager: Billy Lamont
- Stadium: Boghead Park, Dumbarton
- Scottish League Division 2: 1st
- Scottish Cup: Third Round
- Scottish League Cup: Second Round
- B&Q Cup: First Round
- Top goalscorer: League: Jimmy Gilmour (19); All: Jimmy Gilmour (20)
- Highest home attendance: 2,104
- Lowest home attendance: 390
- Average home league attendance: 820

Season 1991–92 was the 108th football season in which Dumbarton competed at a Scottish national level, entering the Scottish Football League for the 86th time, the Scottish Cup for the 97th time, the Scottish League Cup for the 45th time and the Scottish Challenge Cup for the second time.

== Overview ==
It was almost fated that Dumbarton would win the Second Division championship, 100 years after their last reign as Scottish League champions. However, the season was not without its ups and downs. Early cup exits seemed to strengthen the club's will, with the B&Q cup defeat to Montrose at the beginning of October being followed by a run of 12 matches which produced 9 victories and just one loss – giving Dumbarton a four-point lead at the top of the table at Christmas. For some reason the wins dried up, with only one victory being taken from the next 10 games. However, this time Dumbarton were not to be denied, and a final unbeaten run of 7 games was enough to secure the title and Division 1 football for the following season.

In the Scottish Cup, after early wins over East Stirling and Alloa, Dumbarton fell to defeat to Highland League opponents Huntly in the third round.

In the second round of the League Cup, Airdrie defeated Dumbarton after extra time. Dumbarton played the match with eight players from early in the second half.

Finally, due to the success of the previous season's centenary cup, the competition was continued to be known as the B&Q Cup. Dumbarton however once again tasted first round defeat, this time at the hands of Montrose.

Locally, Dumbarton's defence of the Stirlingshire Cup was short-lived, with a first round loss to Premier Division Falkirk.

== Results & fixtures ==
Win Draw Loss

=== Scottish Second Division ===
10 August 1991 Second Division	Queen's Park	0–3	Dumbarton	Hampden Park
			Gibson 70'; Gimour 79'; Meechan 87'	Attendance: 657; Referee: H Dallas

17 August 1991 Second Division	Dumbarton	1–1	Berwick Rangers	Boghead Park
	McQuade 57'		Tait 87'	Attendance: 524; Referee: J Kelly

24 August 1991 Second Division	Stranraer	2–1	Dumbarton	Stair Park
	Henderson 36'; Sloan 85'		Martin 17'	Attendance: 630; Referee: J McCluskey

31 August 1991 Second Division	Dumbarton	4–3	Albion Rovers	Boghead Park
	Meechan 4'; Gilmour 17', 84' (pen.); MacIver 68'		Edgar 57', 80'; Stalker 12'	Attendance: 586; Referee: L Mottram

7 September 1991 Second Division	Dumbarton	0–0	Clyde	Boghead Park
				Attendance: 1,029; Referee: D McVicar

14 September 1991 Second Division	Brechin City	0–4	Dumbarton	Glebe Park, Brechin
			McConville 7'; Gibson 9'; Gilmour 38' (pen.); McQuade 80'	Attendance: 491; Referee: M Pocock

17 September 1991 Second Division	Dumbarton	2–1	Arbroath	Boghead Park
	Gilmour 8'; McQuade 38'		Farnan 22'	Attendance: 777

21 September 1991 Second Division	East Stirling	1–2	Dumbarton	Firs Park
	Diver 12'		Meechan 57', 75'	Attendance: 355

28 September 1991 Second Division	Dumbarton	1–2	East Fife	Boghead Park
	Gilmour 46'		Sludden 5'; Scott 48'	Attendance: 753; Referee: J Fulton

5 October 1991 Second Division	Alloa Athletic	1–2	Dumbarton	Recreation Park, Alloa
	Hendry 5'		Willock 21'; McQuade 80'	Attendance: 667; Referee: W Crombie

12 October 1991 Second Division	Dumbarton	1–0	Stenhousemuir	Boghead Park
	Willock 26'			Attendance: 607; Referee: M Clark

19 October 1991 Second Division	Queen of the South	2–4	Dumbarton	Palmerston Park
	Thomson 42'; Templeton 47'		Gilmour 26'; McQuade 24'; Meechan 51'; McConville 66'	Attendance: 893; Referee: J Kelly

26 October 1991 Second Division	Cowdenbeath	2–1	Dumbarton	Central Park, Cowdenbeath
	Lamont 42', 45'		McQuade 20'	Attendance: 309; Referee: L Thow

2 November 1991 Second Division	Dumbarton	3–1	Queen's Park	Boghead Park
	Gilmour 43', 61'; Gibson 65'		Rodden 4'	Attendance: 557; Referee: D Millar

9 November 1991 Second Division	Berwick Rangers	2–2	Dumbarton	Shielfield Park
	Thorpe 4'; Bickmore 26'		Gilmour 7' (pen.); Meechan 17'	Attendance: 305; Referee: R Orr

16 November 1991 Second Division	Dumbarton	1–0	Stranraer	Boghead Park
	Gibson 57'			Attendance: 631; Referee: H Dallas

23 November 1991 Second Division	Clyde	0–1	Dumbarton	Douglas Park
			Gibson 50'	Attendance: 834; Referee: b McGinlay

30 November 1991 Second Division	Dumbarton	3–0	Brechin City	Boghead Park
	McQuade 31'; Gibson 76'; Gilmour 78' (pen.)			Attendance: 670; Referee: C Ross

14 December 1991 Second Division	Dumbarton	0–0	Cowdenbeath	Boghead Park
				Attendance: 964; Referee: J Herald

26 December 1991 Second Division	Albion Rovers	0–3	Dumbarton	Cliftonhill Stadium
			Melvin 5'; Willock 54', 70'	Attendance: 650; Referee: G Evans

28 December 1991 Second Division	Arbroath	1–0	Dumbarton	Gayfield Park
	McNaughton 62'			Attendance: 667; Referee: G Smith

11 January 1992 Second Division	Dumbarton	2–2	Alloa Athletic	Boghead Park
	Gilmour 57'; Willock 60'		Newbigging 19'; McCulloch 29'	Attendance: 914; Referee: J Renton

14 January 1992 Second Division	Dumbarton	1–1	East Stirling	Boghead Park
	Gilmour (pen.)		Lytwyn 53'	Attendance: 787; Referee: L Thow

18 January 1992 Second Division	East Fife	2–2	Dumbarton	Bayview Park, Methil
	Hope 16'; Brown 35'		Gibson 61'; Gilmour 73' (pen.)	Attendance: 1,220; Referee: J Timmons

1 February 1992 Second Division	Dumbarton	3–1	Queen of the South	Boghead Park
	Meechan 17'; Gilmour 42' (pen.)		Hetherington 23'	Attendance: 627; Referee: W Young

4 February 1992 Second Division	Stenhousemuir	1–0	Dumbarton	Ochilview Park
	Cairney 78'			Attendance: 426; Referee: D Miller

8 February 1992 Second Division	Dumbarton	0–0	Stranraer	Boghead Park
				Attendance: 621; Referee: W Innes

15 February 1992 Second Division	Albion Rovers	1–1	Dumbarton	Cliftonhill Stadium
	Moore 13'		Willock 86'	Attendance: 335; Referee: R Tait

25 February 1992 Second Division	Dumbarton	1–3	Brechin City	Boghead Park
	Gilmour 45' (pen.)		Ritchie 21', 34'; Miller	Attendance: 390; Referee: L Mottram

29 February 1992 Second Division	Queen's Park	0–0	Dumbarton	Hampden Park
				Attendance: 589; Referee: J Herald

14 March 1992 Second Division	Queen of the South	1–2	Dumbarton	Palmerston Park
	Robertson 22'		Gibson 61'; Willock 90'	Attendance: 583; Referee: J McGillvray

17 March 1992 Second Division	Dumbarton	0–1	East Stirling	Boghead Park
			Diver 65'	Attendance: 584; Referee: D McVicar

21 March 1992 Second Division	Dumbarton	1–1	Alloa Athletic	Boghead Park
	McConville 88'		Newbigging 70' (pen.)	Attendance: 656; Referee: W Crombie

28 March 1992 Second Division	Berwick Rangers	1–5	Dumbarton	Shielfield Park
	Tait 74'		Marsland 13'; McQuade 20', 36', 72'; Meechan 41'	Attendance: 174; Referee: G Smith

4 April 1992 Second Division	East Fife	0–2	Dumbarton	Bayview Park, Methil
			McQuade 15'; Gibson 76'	Attendance: 1,166; Referee: A Waddell

11 April 1992 Second Division	Dumbarton	2–1	Clyde	Boghead Park
	Meechan 22'; Gilmour 85'		Archibald 78'	Attendance: 1,001; Referee: A Huett

18 April 1992 Second Division	Dumbarton	2–1	Cowdenbeath	Boghead Park
	McQuade 13', 59'		Wright 58'	Attendance: 1,807; Referee: H Dallas

25 April 1992 Second Division	Stenhousemuir	0–1	Dumbarton	Ochilview Park
			Martin 35'	Attendance: 1,022; Referee: E Martindale

2 May 1992 Second Division	Dumbarton	1–1	Arbroath	Boghead Park
	Gilmour 25'}		Holmes 54'	Attendance: 2,104; Referee: J Innes

=== Skol Cup ===
13 August 1991 League Cup round 1	Berwick Rangers	0–1	Dumbarton	Shielfield Park
			Gibson 60'	Attendance: 501; Referee: C Ross

20 August 1991 League Cup round 1	Dumbarton	1–2 (a.e.t.)	Airdrie	Boghead Park
	Gibson 94'		Crainie 112' (pen.); Coyle 120'	Attendance: 3,000; Referee: W Morrison

=== B&Q Cup ===
1 October 1991 Challenge Cup round 1	Montrose	2–1	Dumbarton	Links Park
	Den Bieman 4'; Rougvie 82'		Gibson 80'	Attendance: 456; Referee: J Renton

=== Tennant's Scottish Cup ===
7 December 1991 Cup round 1	East Stirling	0–2	Dumbarton	Firs Park
			McQuade 16'; Boyd 28'	Attendance: 339; Referee: J Fulton; Man of the Match: J Boyd

4 January 1992 Cup round 2	Alloa Athletic	0–2	Dumbarton	Recreation Park, Alloa
			Gilmour 56' (pen.); Dempsey 78'	Attendance: 1,134; Referee: M Pocock; Man of the Match: J Gilmour

25 January 1992 Cup round 2	Dumbarton	0–2	Huntly	Boghead Park
			McGinlay 52', 82'	Attendance: 1,755; Referee: J Kelly

=== Stirlingshire Cup ===
7 August 1991 First Round	Dumbarton	0–5	Falkirk	Boghead Park
			Cody 57'; Taylor 67'; Oliver 74'; Hamilton 88'; Mooney 89'	Referee: D Black

=== Pre-season/Other Matches ===
31 July 1991 Friendly	Dumbarton	1–1	Rangers XI	Boghead Park
	Gilmour 13'		Morrow 51'	Referee: D Black

4 August 1991 Testimonial	Dumbarton	0–5	Manchester United XI	Boghead Park
			Robins 22', 54'; Hughes 26', 63'; McClair 89'	Attendance: 1,590; Referee: B McGinlay

== League table ==
Pos	Team	Pld	W	D	L	GF	GA	GD	Pts	Promotion
1	Dumbarton (C, P)	39	20	12	7	65	37	+28	52	Promotion to the First Division
2	Cowdenbeath (P)	39	22	7	10	74	52	+22	51	Promotion to the First Division
3	Alloa Athletic	39	20	10	9	58	38	+20	50	
4	East Fife	39	19	11	9	72	57	+15	49	
5	Clyde	39	18	7	14	61	43	+18	43	

Source: "1991-1992 Second Division - SPFL Archive". SPFL.
Rules for classification: 1) points; 2) goal difference; 3) number of goals scored.
(C) Champions; (P) Promoted

== Player statistics ==
=== Squad ===
No.	Pos	Nat	Player	Total		Second Division		League Cup		Challenge Cup		Scottish Cup	
No.	Pos	Nat	Player	Apps	Goals	Apps	Goals	Apps	Goals	Apps	Goals	Apps	Goals
	GK	(Scotland) SCO	Tom Carson	6	0	6+0	0	0+0	0	0+0	0	0+0	0
	GK	(Scotland) SCO	Ian MacFarlane	39	0	33+0	0	2+0	0	1+0	0	3+0	0
	DF	(Scotland) SCO	John Boyd	42	1	34+2	0	2+0	0	1+0	0	3+0	1
	DF	(Scotland) SCO	Alan Foster	5	0	1+4	0	0+0	0	0+0	0	0+0	0
	DF	(Scotland) SCO	Stevie Gow	40	0	34+0	0	2+0	0	0+1	0	3+0	0
	DF	(Scotland) SCO	Martin Melvin	44	1	38+0	1	2+0	0	1+0	0	3+0	0
	MF	(Scotland) SCO	Jim Cowell	9	0	1+7	0	0+0	0	0+0	0	1+0	0
	MF	(Scotland) SCO	Jim Dempsey	36	1	28+2	0	2+0	0	1+0	0	3+0	1
	MF	(Scotland) SCO	Jim Hughes	8	0	3+3	0	0+0	0	0+0	0	1+1	0
	MF	(Scotland) SCO	Jim Marsland	38	1	29+4	1	2+0	0	1+0	0	2+0	0
	MF	(Scotland) SCO	Paul Martin	43	2	38+0	2	1+0	0	1+0	0	3+0	0
	MF	(Scotland) SCO	Bobby McConville	27	3	21+3	3	0+0	0	1+0	0	2+0	0
	MF	(Scotland) SCO	Martin McGarvey	9	0	3+5	0	0+0	0	0+0	0	1+0	0
	MF	(Scotland) SCO	Colin McNair	2	0	0+1	0	1+0	0	0+0	0	0+0	0
	MF	(Scotland) SCO	Jim Meechan	40	9	33+3	9	2+0	0	0+0	0	2+0	0
	MF	(Scotland) SCO	Stuart Millar	2	0	1+1	0	0+0	0	0+0	0	0+0	0
	MF	(Scotland) SCO	Mark Nelson	8	0	6+2	0	0+0	0	0+0	0	0+0	0
	FW	(Scotland) SCO	David Edgar	4	0	0+1	0	0+0	0	0+1	0	0+2	0
	FW	(Scotland) SCO	Charlie Gibson	43	12	37+0	9	2+0	2	1+0	1	3+0	0
	FW	(Scotland) SCO	Jimmy Gilmour	42	20	36+1	19	2+0	0	0+0	0	3+0	1
	FW	(Scotland) SCO	Stuart MacIver	3	1	0+3	1	0+0	0	0+0	0	0+0	0
	FW	(Scotland) SCO	Dougie McCracken	7	0	3+3	0	0+0	0	1+0	0	0+0	0
	FW	(Scotland) SCO	John McQuade	36	14	32+1	13	2+0	0	0+0	0	1+0	1
	FW	(Scotland) SCO	Andy Willock	33	7	12+18	7	0+0	0	1+0	0	0+2	0

=== Transfers ===
==== Players in ====
Player	From	Date
(Scotland) Jimmy Gilmour	(Scotland) Clyde	2 Jul 1991
(Scotland) Ian MacFarlane	(Scotland) Hamilton	12 Jul 1991
(Scotland) Bobby McConville	(Scotland) Stirling Albion	7 Sep 1991
(Scotland) Andy Willock	(Scotland) Ayr United	1 Oct 1991
(Scotland) Jim Cowell	(Scotland) East Fife	18 Dec 1991
(Scotland) Tom Carson	(Scotland) Dundee (loan)	1 Mar 1992
(Scotland) Mark Nelson	(Scotland) Stenhousemuir	17 Mar 1992

==== Players out ====
Player	To	Date
(Scotland) Steve Morrison	(Scotland) Clyde	24 Jul 1991
(Scotland) Hugh Stevenson	(Scotland) Clyde	24 Jul 1991
(Scotland) Stuart MacIver	(Scotland) Clyde	26 sep 1991
(Scotland) Dougie McCracken	(Scotland) East Fife	13 Dec 1991
(Scotland) Jim McGinlay	(Scotland) Vale of Leven	
(Scotland) Paul Quinn	(Scotland) Annbank United	
(Scotland) Boyd Strachan	(Scotland) Vale of Leven	
(Scotland) Jim Chapman		
(Scotland) Willie McGuire		
(Scotland) Steve Marshall		

== Reserve Team ==
Dumbarton competed in the Scottish Reserve League (West), and with 4 wins and 6 draws from 34 games, finished 18th of 18.

In the Reserve League Cup, Dumbarton lost out to Morton in the first round.

== Trivia ==
- Between the league game against Berwick Rangers on 9 November and the league game against Arbroath on 28 December, Ian MacFarlane did not concede a single goal - a record of 666 minutes - beating Tom Carson's record set in season 1983-84.
- The Scottish Cup match against Huntly on 25 January marked Stevie Gow's 100th appearance for Dumbarton in all national competitions - the 99th Dumbarton player to reach this milestone.
- The League match against Queen of the South on 1 February marked Charlie Gibson's 100th appearance for Dumbarton in all national competitions - the 100th Dumbarton player to reach this milestone.
- The League match against Stenhousemuir on 4 February marked Jim Dempsey's 100th appearance for Dumbarton in all national competitions - the 101st Dumbarton player to reach this milestone.
- Crippled by debts, Berwick Rangers had been evicted from their home at Shielfield Park, however Albion Rovers made their ground available for the away League match on 28 March.

== See also ==
- 1991–92 in Scottish football
