= 1986–87 Dumbarton F.C. season =

Dumbarton
1986–1987 season
- Manager: Alex Totten
- Stadium: Boghead Park, Dumbarton
- Scottish League Division 1: 3rd
- Scottish Cup: Third Round
- Scottish League Cup: Third Round
- Top goalscorer: League: Gerry McCoy (21); All: Gerry McCoy (22)
- Highest home attendance: 2,500
- Lowest home attendance: 440
- Average home league attendance: 1,180

Season 1986–87 was the 103rd football season in which Dumbarton competed at a Scottish national level, entering the Scottish Football League for the 81st time, the Scottish Cup for the 92nd time and the Scottish League Cup for the 40th time.

== Overview ==
Dumbarton began another First Division campaign with a new manager at the helm - Alex Totten - who had been released from his duties with Rangers following the arrival of Graeme Souness. Following another league reconstruction, the First Division clubs would play each other 4 times - a big ask particularly for the part-time clubs - but as things turned out it was to be a close thing for promotion with Dumbarton always up with the front runners. In the end, it was to be a 3rd-place finish - just 4 points behind champions Morton.

In the Scottish Cup, it would be another early exit for Dumbarton, this time to Brechin City after a draw, in the third round.

In the League Cup, Stirling Albion were dispatched in the second round before a fighting display against Celtic, saw Dumbarton's interest in the competition come to an end for another year.

Locally, Dumbarton failed to keep a grip on the Stirlingshire Cup, with Stirling Albion gaining some revenge for their League Cup exit, with a semi final win.

== Results & fixtures ==
Win Draw Loss

=== Scottish First Division ===
9 August 1986 First Division	Partick Thistle	1–2	Dumbarton	Firhill Park
	Herd 27'		McCahill 82'; McGowan 88'	Attendance: 2,272; Referee: L Thow

13 August 1986 First Division	Dumbarton	0–1	Dunfermline Athletic	Boghead Park
			Montgomerie 67' (o.g.)	Attendance: 1,780; Referee: G Evans

16 August 1986 First Division	Airdrie	1–0	Dumbarton	Broomfield Park
	Black 41'			Attendance: 1,500; Referee: K Hope

23 August 1986 First Division	Dumbarton	3–2	Forfar Athletic	Boghead Park
	Coyle, O 8', 89' (pen.); Bourke 78'		MacDonald 34'; Clarke 66'	Attendance: 550; Referee: J McCluskey

30 August 1986 First Division	Morton	0–3	Dumbarton	Cappielow Park
			Moore 13'; Coyle, O 27'; Houston 63'	Attendance: 2,300; Referee: D Miller

6 September 1986 First Division	Dumbarton	3–1	Brechin City	Boghead Park
	Coyle, O 10'; Coyle, T 62'; Bourke 86'		Gallacher	Attendance: 480; Referee: M Delaney

13 September 1986 First Division	Dumbarton	1–0	Montrose	Boghead Park
	Coyle, T 90'			Attendance: 440; Referee: J Smith

16 September 1986 First Division	Kilmarnock	2–1	Dumbarton	Rugby Park
	Bryson 36'; Clougherty 78' (o.g.)		Coyle, O 12'	Attendance: 1,200; Referee: A Ferguson

20 September 1986 First Division	Clyde	2–1	Dumbarton	Shawfield Stadium
	Millar 15'; Watters 35'		Coyle, O 38'	Attendance: 800; Referee: D McVicar

27 September 1986 First Division	Dumbarton	2–1	East Fife	Boghead Park
	McCoy 2'; Moore 24'		Burgess 77'	Attendance: 630; Referee: P Hanley

30 September 1986 First Division	Queen of the South	1–3	Dumbarton	Palmerston Park
	Cloy 17'		Moore 3'; Coyle, O 86'; McCoy 89'	Attendance: 1,620; Referee: R Paterson

4 October 1986 First Division	Dumbarton	2–2	Partick Thistle	Boghead Park
	Coyle, O 1' 56' (pen.)		Montgomerie 20' (o.g.); Cairns 68'	Attendance: 1,200; Referee: H Gould

8 October 1986 First Division	Dunfermline Athletic	0–1	Dumbarton	East End Park
			McCoy 71'	Attendance: 4,161; Referee: J Duncan

11 October 1986 First Division	Forfar Athletic	3–5	Dumbarton	Station Park, Forfar
	Scott 12'; MacDonald 89'		Coyle, O 43' (pen.), 84' (pen.); McCoy 52', 57'; Clarke 50' (o.g.)	Attendance: 815; Referee: W Crombie

18 October 1986 First Division	Dumbarton	2–1	Airdrie	Boghead Park
	McNeil 41'; Coyle, O 55'		Lindsay 7'	Attendance: 1,200; Referee: H Williamson

25 October 1986 First Division	Montrose	1–0	Dumbarton	Links Park
	Brown 24'			Attendance: 350; Referee: W Knowles

29 October 1986 First Division	Dumbarton	2–0	Kilmarnock	Boghead Park
	McCoy 60'			Attendance: 1,050; Referee: T Muirhead

1 November 1986 First Division	Brechin City	3–1	Dumbarton	Glebe Park, Brechin
	Powell 10' 90'; Adam 88'		McCoy 84' (pen.)	Attendance: 450; Referee: J McGillvray

8 November 1986 First Division	Dumbarton	2–1	Morton	Boghead Park
	Coyle, T 45'; McCahill 83'		O'Hara 86'	Attendance: 1,600

15 November 1986 First Division	Dumbarton	1–1	Clyde	Boghead Park
	Houston 15'		Tait 45'	Attendance: 1,200; Referee: A Waddell

22 November 1986 First Division	East Fife	0–0	Dumbarton	Bayview Park, Methil
				Attendance: 1,494; Referee: R Valentine

29 November 1986 First Division	Dumbarton	1–1	Queen of the South	Boghead Park
	McCoy 25'		Armstrong 29' (pen.)	Attendance: 900; Referee: G Evans

6 December 1986 First Division	Partick Thistle	0–2	Dumbarton	Firhill Park
			Houston 37'; McCoy 39'	Attendance: 2,284; Referee: A Ferguson

13 December 1986 First Division	Dumbarton	1–2	Dunfermline Athletic	Boghead Park
	Houston 41'		McCall 9'; McCathie 89'	Attendance: 2,431; Referee: K O'Donnell

20 December 1986 First Division	Dumbarton	0–1	Forfar Athletic	Boghead Park
			McDonald 58'	Attendance: 1,000; Referee: D Yeats

27 December 1986 First Division	Airdrie	1–0	Dumbarton	Broomfield Park
	Frye			Attendance: 1,362; Referee: T Muirhead

1 January 1987 First Division	Morton	4–1	Dumbarton	Cappielow Park
	Robertson; McNeil; Alexander		Coyle, O	Attendance: 1,400; Referee: J Renton

24 January 1987 First Division	Clyde	1–2	Dumbarton	Shawfield Stadium
	Murphy 90+2'		Rooney 46'; Coyle, O 65'	Attendance: 800; Referee: A Roy

27 January 1987 First Division	Kilmarnock	1–2	Dumbarton	Rugby Park
	McVeigh 28'		MacIver 7', 29'	Attendance: 1,000; Referee: H Williamson

7 February 1987 First Division	Dumbarton	1–1	East Fife	Boghead Park
	McCoy 89'		Kirkwood 24'	Attendance: 1,500; Referee: W Crombie

14 February 1987 First Division	Queen of the South	0–1	Dumbarton	Palmerston Park
			MacIver 15'	Attendance: 1,400; Referee: M Delaney

21 February 1987 First Division	Dumbarton	2–1	Montrose	Boghead Park
	Houston 41'; MacIver		Allan	Attendance: 1,000; Referee: D Holt

28 February 1987 First Division	Dumbarton	1–0	Partick Thistle	Boghead Park
	McGowan 78'			Attendance: 1,600; Referee: J Duncan

7 March 1987 First Division	Dunfermline Athletic	1–0	Dumbarton	East End Park
	Morrison 10'			Attendance: 4,366; Referee: P Hanley

17 March 1987 First Division	Forfar Athletic	0–2	Dumbarton	Station Park, Forfar
			McCoy 47'; Rooney 77'	Attendance: 720; Referee: K O'Donnell

21 March 1987 First Division	Dumbarton	2–2	Airdrie	Boghead Park
	Coyle, O 55' (pen.); Coyle, T 63'		Lawrie 8'; Flood 64'	Attendance: 1,200; Referee: A Huett

28 March 1987 First Division	Dumbarton	2–3	Morton	Boghead Park
	McCoy 27'; Coyle, O 58'		Alexander 3'; Turner 52'; Boag 88'	Attendance: 2,500; Referee: R Paterson

31 March 1987 First Division	Dumbarton	1–1	Brechin City	Boghead Park
	MacIver 7'		Lytwyn 5'	Attendance: 1,050; Referee: D Miller

4 April 1987 First Division	Brechin City	1–2	Dumbarton	Glebe Park, Brechin
	Adam 77'		McCoy 46', 84'	Attendance: 382; Referee: H Williamson

11 April 1987 First Division	Dumbarton	3–2	Kilmarnock	Boghead Park
	Coyle, O 25'; McCoy 74'; MacIver 78'		Reid 11' 16'	Attendance: 1,500; Referee: D McVicar

18 April 1987 First Division	Montrose	2–0	Dumbarton	Links Park
	Paterson 50', 89'			Attendance: 300; Referee: H Gould

25 April 1987 First Division	Dumbarton	2–1	Clyde	Boghead Park
	McCoy 50' (pen.), 51'		McGlashan 57'	Attendance: 1,250; Referee: R Valentine

2 May 1987 First Division	East Fife	2–1	Dumbarton	Bayview Park, Methil
	McNaughton 42' (pen.), 49'		McCoy 72' (pen.)	Attendance: 449; Referee: A Roy

9 May 1987 First Division	Dumbarton	3–0	Queen of the South	Boghead Park
	MacIver 23'; McCoy 65'; Coyle, T 88'			Attendance: 1,000

=== Skol Cup ===
20 August 1986 League Cup round 2	Dumbarton	1–0	Stirling Albion	Boghead Park
	Coyle, T 78'			Attendance: 746; Referee: G Cumming

27 August 1986 League Cup round 3	Celtic	3–0	Dumbarton	Celtic Park
	Johnston 44', 84'; McStay 78'			Attendance: 11,390; Referee: J McCluskey

=== SHEG Scottish Cup ===
31 January 1987 Cup round 3	Brechin City	2–2	Dumbarton	Glebe Park, Brechin
	Lees 32'; Adam 47'		MacIver 21'; McCoy 25'	Attendance: 506; Referee: J McGillvray

4 February 1987 Cup round 3R	Dumbarton	2–3	Brechin City	Boghead Park
	MacIver 32'; Coyle, T 82'		Adam 6'; Powell 10'; Lees 28'	Attendance: 2,000; Referee: J McGillvray

=== Stirlingshire Cup ===
4 August 1986 First Round	Falkirk	1–2	Dumbarton	Brockville Park
	Nichol 72'		Moore 8'; McCoy 24'

21 April 1987 Semi Final	Dumbarton	1–2	Stirling Albion	Boghead Park
	Martin 44'		Spence 35'; Ormond 83'

=== Pre-season matches ===
26 July 1986 Friendly	Huntly	2–1	Dumbarton	Christie Park, Huntly
	Copland 73'; Brebner 85'		Coyle, O 62'	Referee: A Freeland

27 July 1986 Friendly	Rothes	0–5	Dumbarton	Mosset Park, Forres
			MacIver

31 July 1986 Friendly	Vale of Leven	1–4	Dumbarton	Millburn Park
	McLaren		Goal

2 August 1986 Friendly	Dumbarton	4–1	Alloa Athletic	Boghead Park
	McCoy; MacIver; Coyle, T		Goal

== League table ==
Pos	Team	Pld	W	D	L	GF	GA	GD	Pts	Promotion or relegation
1	Morton (C, P)	44	24	9	11	88	56	+32	57	Promotion to the Premier Division
2	Dunfermline Athletic (P)	44	23	10	11	61	41	+20	56	Promotion to the Premier Division
3	Dumbarton	44	23	7	14	67	52	+15	53	
4	East Fife	44	15	21	8	68	55	+13	51	
5	Airdrieonians	44	20	11	13	58	46	+12	51	

Source: RSSSF and statto
Rules for classification: 1) points; 2) goal difference; 3) number of goals scored.
(C) Champions; (P) Promoted

== Player statistics ==
=== Squad ===
No.	Pos	Nat	Player	Total		First Division		League Cup		Scottish Cup	
No.	Pos	Nat	Player	Apps	Goals	Apps	Goals	Apps	Goals	Apps	Goals
	GK	(Scotland) SCO	Gordon Arthur	35	0	31+0	0	2+0	0	2+0	0
	GK	(Scotland) SCO	Hugh Stevenson	13	0	13+0	0	0+0	0	0+0	0
	DF	(Scotland) SCO	Ray Montgomerie	38	0	35+0	0	1+0	0	2+0	0
	DF	(Scotland) SCO	Billy Traynor	7	0	7+0	0	0+0	0	0+0	0
	MF	(Scotland) SCO	Mark Clougherty	30	0	26+0	0	2+0	0	2+0	0
	MF	(Scotland) SCO	Owen Coyle	46	17	33+10	17	1+0	0	2+0	0
	MF	(Scotland) SCO	Tommy Coyle	46	7	43+0	5	2+0	1	1+0	1
	MF	(Scotland) SCO	Harry Curran	11	0	8+0	0	1+0	0	2+0	0
	MF	(Scotland) SCO	Danny Docherty	24	0	18+4	0	2+0	0	0+0	0
	MF	(Scotland) SCO	Alan Kay	21	0	18+2	0	1+0	0	0+0	0
	MF	(Scotland) SCO	Dave Martin	34	0	32+0	0	0+0	0	2+0	0
	MF	(Scotland) SCO	Steve McCahill	42	2	37+2	2	1+0	0	2+0	0
	MF	(Scotland) SCO	Joe McLeod	5	0	4+1	0	0+0	0	0+0	0
	MF	(Scotland) SCO	Donald McNeil	14	1	12+0	1	2+0	0	0+0	0
	MF	(Scotland) SCO	Jim McNeil	2	0	2+0	0	0+0	0	0+0	0
	MF	(Scotland) SCO	Jackie Rafferty	3	0	2+1	0	0+0	0	0+0	0
	MF	(Scotland) SCO	Jim Rooney	25	2	23+1	2	0+0	0	1+0	0
	FW	(Scotland) SCO	John Bourke	13	1	8+3	1	1+1	0	0+0	0
	FW	(Scotland) SCO	Arthur Grant	26	0	10+15	0	0+1	0	0+0	0
	FW	(Scotland) SCO	Peter Houston	42	5	34+4	5	2+0	0	0+2	0
	FW	(Scotland) SCO	Stuart MacIver	34	9	18+13	7	1+0	0	2+0	2
	FW	(Scotland) SCO	Gerry McCoy	43	22	35+4	21	0+2	0	2+0	1
	FW	(Scotland) SCO	Pat McGowan	35	2	17+15	2	1+0	0	2+0	0
	FW	(Scotland) SCO	Allan Moore	20	3	18+0	3	2+0	0	0+0	0

=== International caps ===
Owen Coyle was selected to play for the Republic of Ireland Under 21 team in matches against Scotland on 17 February played at Easter Road and against Belgium on 28 April.

=== Transfers ===
==== Players in ====
Player	From	Date
(Scotland) Arthur Grant	(Scotland) Stenhousemuir	9 Aug 1986
(Scotland) Peter Houston	(Scotland) Falkirk	16 Aug 1986
(Scotland) Dave Martin	(Scotland) Alloa Athletic	20 Sep 1986
(Scotland) Billy Traynor	(Scotland) Belhaven Athletic	6 Nov 1986
(Scotland) Jim Rooney	(Scotland) St Mirren	8 Nov 1986
(Scotland) Joe McLeod	(Scotland) Dundee Utd (loan)	16 Feb 1987
(Scotland) Jim McNeil	(Scotland) Vale of Clyde	28 Mar 1987

==== Players out ====
Player	To	Date
(Scotland) Martin McGowan	(Scotland) Stranraer	24 May 1986
(Scotland) Gerry Crawley	(Scotland) Brechin City	5 Jul 1986
(Scotland) Mark Shanks	(Scotland) Queen of the South	12 Jul 1986
(Scotland) Paul Taylor	(Scotland) Berwick Rangers	26 Jul 1986
(Scotland) Albert Craig	(Scotland) Hamilton	16 Aug 1986
(Scotland) John Bourke	(Scotland) Brechin City	1 Nov 1986
(Scotland) Allan Moore	(Scotland) Hearts	15 Nov 1986
(Scotland) Harry Curran	(Scotland) Dundee United	28 Feb 1987
(Scotland) Ken Thomson	(Scotland) Kilbirnie Ladeside	

== Reserve Team ==
Dumbarton competed in the Scottish Reserve League (West).

== Trivia ==
- The League match against Clyde on 15 November marked Gordon Arthur's 100th appearance for Dumbarton in all national competitions - the 92nd Dumbarton player to reach this milestone.
- Dumbarton ended the season managerless - Alex Totten having been appointed at St Johnstone, and with the death of chairman and benefactor Sir Hugh Fraser, the club would face severe financial challenges in the coming season.

== See also ==
- 1986–87 in Scottish football
