= Creaney =

Creaney is a surname. Notable people with the surname include:

- Gerry Creaney (born 1970), Scottish footballer (Celtic FC)
- James Creaney (born 1988), Scottish footballer (Dumbarton FC)
- Jim Creaney (born 1964), Scottish footballer (Dumbarton FC)
- John Creaney (1933–2008), lawyer in Northern Ireland
