= 1988–89 Scottish First Division =

Scottish First Division
- Season: 1988–89
- Champions: Dunfermline Athletic
- Promoted: Dunfermline Athletic
- Relegated: Kilmarnock; Queen of the South
- Matches played: 273
- Goals scored: 759 (2.78 per match)
- Top goalscorer: Kenny MacDonald (22)
- Biggest home win: Falkirk 7–1 Queen of the South, 06.05.1989
- Biggest away win: Queen of the South 0–6 Kilmarnock, 13.05.1989

The 1988–89 Scottish First Division season was won by Dunfermline Athletic, who were promoted two points ahead of Falkirk. Kilmarnock and Queen of the South were relegated to the Second Division.

== League table ==
Pos	Team	Pld	W	D	L	GF	GA	GD	Pts	Promotion or relegation
1	Dunfermline Athletic (C, P)	39	22	10	7	60	36	+24	54	Promotion to the Premier Division
2	Falkirk	39	22	8	9	71	37	+34	52	
3	Clydebank	39	18	12	9	80	55	+25	48	
4	Airdrieonians	39	17	13	9	66	44	+22	47	
5	Morton	39	16	9	14	46	46	0	41	
6	St Johnstone	39	14	12	13	51	42	+9	40	
7	Raith Rovers	39	15	10	14	50	52	−2	40	
8	Partick Thistle	39	13	11	15	57	58	−1	37	
9	Forfar Athletic	39	10	16	13	52	56	−4	36	
10	Meadowbank Thistle	39	13	10	16	45	50	−5	36	
11	Ayr United	39	13	9	17	56	72	−16	35	
12	Clyde	39	9	16	14	40	52	−12	34	
13	Kilmarnock (R)	39	10	14	15	47	60	−13	34	Relegation to the Second Division
14	Queen of the South (R)	39	2	8	29	38	99	−61	12	Relegation to the Second Division

Source: RSSSF and statto
Rules for classification: 1) points; 2) goal difference; 3) number of goals scored.
(C) Champions; (P) Promoted; (R) Relegated
