= 1988–89 Scottish Football League =

Scottish football season

Statistics of the Scottish Football League in season 1988–89.

== Scottish Premier Division ==
Pos	Team	Pld	W	D	L	GF	GA	GD	Pts	Qualification or relegation
1	Rangers (C)	36	26	4	6	62	26	+36	56	Qualification for the European Cup first round
2	Aberdeen	36	18	14	4	51	25	+26	50	Qualification for the UEFA Cup first round
3	Celtic	36	21	4	11	66	44	+22	46	Qualification for the Cup Winners' Cup first round
4	Dundee United	36	16	12	8	44	26	+18	44	Qualification for the UEFA Cup first round
5	Hibernian	36	13	9	14	37	36	+1	35	Qualification for the UEFA Cup first round
6	Heart of Midlothian	36	9	13	14	35	42	−7	31	
7	St Mirren	36	11	7	18	39	55	−16	29	
8	Dundee	36	9	10	17	34	48	−14	28	
9	Motherwell	36	7	13	16	25	44	−19	27	
10	Hamilton Academical (R)	36	6	2	28	19	76	−57	14	Relegation to the 1989–90 Scottish First Division

Source: Statto
Rules for classification: 1) points; 2) goal difference; 3) number of goals scored.
(C) Champions; (R) Relegated

== Scottish First Division ==
Pos	Team	Pld	W	D	L	GF	GA	GD	Pts	Promotion or relegation
1	Dunfermline Athletic (C, P)	39	22	10	7	60	36	+24	54	Promotion to the Premier Division
2	Falkirk	39	22	8	9	71	37	+34	52	
3	Clydebank	39	18	12	9	80	55	+25	48	
4	Airdrieonians	39	17	13	9	66	44	+22	47	
5	Morton	39	16	9	14	46	46	0	41	
6	St Johnstone	39	14	12	13	51	42	+9	40	
7	Raith Rovers	39	15	10	14	50	52	−2	40	
8	Partick Thistle	39	13	11	15	57	58	−1	37	
9	Forfar Athletic	39	10	16	13	52	56	−4	36	
10	Meadowbank Thistle	39	13	10	16	45	50	−5	36	
11	Ayr United	39	13	9	17	56	72	−16	35	
12	Clyde	39	9	16	14	40	52	−12	34	
13	Kilmarnock (R)	39	10	14	15	47	60	−13	34	Relegation to the Second Division
14	Queen of the South (R)	39	2	8	29	38	99	−61	12	Relegation to the Second Division

Source: RSSSF and statto
Rules for classification: 1) points; 2) goal difference; 3) number of goals scored.
(C) Champions; (P) Promoted; (R) Relegated

== Scottish Second Division ==
Pos	Team	Pld	W	D	L	GF	GA	GD	Pts	Promotion
1	Albion Rovers (C, P)	39	21	8	10	65	48	+17	50	Promotion to the First Division
2	Alloa Athletic (P)	39	17	11	11	66	48	+18	45	Promotion to the First Division
3	Brechin City	39	15	13	11	58	49	+9	43	
4	Stirling Albion	39	15	12	12	64	55	+9	42	
5	East Fife	39	14	13	12	55	54	+1	41	
6	Montrose	39	15	11	13	54	55	−1	41	
7	Queen's Park	39	10	18	11	50	49	+1	38	
8	Cowdenbeath	39	13	14	12	48	52	−4	40	
9	East Stirlingshire	39	13	11	15	54	58	−4	37	
10	Arbroath	39	11	15	13	56	63	−7	37	
11	Stranraer	39	12	12	15	58	63	−5	36	
12	Dumbarton	39	12	10	17	45	55	−10	34	
13	Berwick Rangers	39	10	13	16	50	59	−9	33	
14	Stenhousemuir	39	9	11	19	44	59	−15	29	

Rules for classification: 1) points; 2) goal difference; 3) number of goals scored.
(C) Champions; (P) Promoted

== See also ==
- 1988–89 in Scottish football
