= 1982 Brisbane City FC season =

Brisbane City
1982 season
- Head Coach: Nereo Saftich
- Stadium: Spencer Park
- National Soccer League: 16th
- NSL Cup: First round
- Top goalscorer: Bevan Bohan (5)
- Highest home attendance: 3,700 vs. Adelaide City (14 February 1982); National Soccer League
- Lowest home attendance: 1,200 vs. Newcastle KB United (15 August 1982); National Soccer League vs. St George-Budapest (29 August 1982); National Soccer League
- Average home league attendance: 2,053
- Biggest win: 4–1 vs. West Adelaide (H) (11 July 1982); National Soccer League
- Biggest defeat: 0–5 vs. Sydney Olympic (A) (18 April 1982); National Soccer League
Home colours	Away colours

The 1982 season was the sixth in the National Soccer League for Brisbane City Football Club. In addition to the domestic league, they also participated in the NSL Cup. Brisbane City finished 16th in their National Soccer League season, and were eliminated in the first round of the NSL Cup.

== Players ==
Note: Flags indicate national team as defined under FIFA eligibility rules; some limited exceptions apply. Players may hold more than one non-FIFA nationality.

No.	Pos.	Nation	Player
—	FW	AUS	Bevan Bohan
—	MF	SCO	Joe Cairney
—		AUS	Peter Carey
—	GK	AUS	Martin Coe
—	FW	AUS	Willie Conner
—	DF	IRL	Jimmy Dunne
—	FW	AUS	Steve Glockner
—	MF	SCO	Bobby Hamilton
—	DF	SCO	Jim Hermiston
—	FW	AUS	Barry Kelso
—	DF	SCO	Frank Liddell

No.	Pos.	Nation	Player
—	MF	SCO	John McVeigh
—	MF	AUS	Dave Osborne
—	FW	HUN	Joe Palinkas
—	DF	AUS	Steve Perry
—	GK	AUS	Tony Pezzano
—	MF	ENG	Frank Pimblett
—	DF	AUS	Peter Tokesi
—	MF	AUS	David Vincenzino
—	DF	SCO	Billy Wilkinson
—	GK	AUS	Kim Wishart

== Competitions ==
=== Overall record ===
Competition	First match	Last match	Starting round	Final position	Record							
Competition	First match	Last match	Starting round	Final position	Pld	W	D	L	GF	GA	GD	Win %
National Soccer League	14 February 1982	5 September 1982	Matchday 1	16th	30	5	11	14	32	55	−23	16.67
NSL Cup	14 June 1982		First round	First round	1	0	0	1	0	1	−1	0.00
Total					31	5	11	15	32	56	−24	16.13

Source: Competitions

=== National Soccer League ===
==== League table ====
Pos	Team	Pld	W	D	L	GF	GA	GD	Pts	Relegation
1	Sydney City (C)	30	20	5	5	68	28	+40	45	Qualification to Finals series (Note: The Finals series was not considered the championship for the 1982 National Soccer League.)
2	St George-Budapest	30	14	8	8	47	40	+7	36	Qualification to Finals series
3	Wollongong City	30	16	3	11	43	46	−3	35	Qualification to Finals series
4	Heidelberg United	30	13	8	9	42	37	+5	34	Qualification to Finals series
5	Preston Makedonia	30	12	10	8	45	41	+4	34	
6	South Melbourne	30	11	9	10	46	37	+9	31	
7	APIA Leichhardt	30	12	7	11	49	54	−5	31	
8	Sydney Olympic	30	12	6	12	52	42	+10	30	
9	West Adelaide	30	10	8	12	44	40	+4	28	
10	Marconi Fairfield	30	12	4	14	44	43	+1	28	
11	Brisbane Lions	30	10	8	12	39	42	−3	28	
12	Newcastle KB United	30	10	7	13	43	52	−9	27	
13	Adelaide City	30	6	12	12	36	44	−8	24	
14	Footscray JUST	30	5	14	11	34	46	−12	24	
15	Canberra City	30	7	10	13	37	54	−17	24	
16	Brisbane City	30	5	11	14	32	55	−23	21	

Source: rsssf.com
Rules for classification: 1) points; 2) goal difference; 3) number of goals scored.
(C) Champions

==== Results summary ====
Overall								Home						Away					
Pld	W	D	L	GF	GA	GD	Pts	W	D	L	GF	GA	GD	W	D	L	GF	GA	GD
30	5	11	14	32	55	−23	26	4	9	2	24	19	+5	1	2	12	8	36	−28

Source: worldfootball.net

==== Results by round ====
Round	1	2	3	4	5	6	7	8	9	10	11	12	13	14	15	16	17	18	19	20	21	22	23	24	25	26	27	28	29	30
Ground	H	A	H	A	H	A	H	A	H	A	A	H	A	H	A	H	A	H	A	H	A	H	A	H	H	A	H	A	H	A
Result	D	L	D	L	W	L	W	L	D	L	L	L	D	D	L	W	L	L	W	D	L	W	D	D	D	L	D	L	D	L
Position	7	12	13	14	12	13	11	11	13	14	15	15	15	15	15	15	16	16	16	16	16	16	16	16	16	16	16	16	16	16
Points	1	1	2	2	4	4	6	6	7	7	7	7	8	9	9	11	11	11	13	14	14	16	17	18	19	19	20	20	21	21

Source: worldfootball.net
A = Away; H = Home; W = Win; D = Draw; L = Loss

==== Matches ====
Win Draw Loss

14 February 1982 1	Brisbane City	1–1	Adelaide City	Brisbane
	Pimblett 40'	Report	J. Nyskohus 58'	Stadium: Spencer Park; Attendance: 3,700; Referee: Tim Davies

21 February 1982 2	Marconi Fairfield	4–0	Brisbane City	Sydney
	Silva 44'; Bozanic 48', 88' (pen.); Jankovics 61'	Report		Stadium: Marconi Stadium; Attendance: 2,766; Referee: Doug Rennie

28 February 1982 3	Brisbane City	2–2	Brisbane Lions	Brisbane
	Wilkinson 50'; Kelso 81'	Report	Williamson 34', 59'	Stadium: Spencer Park; Attendance: 3,500; Referee: Col Amos

7 March 1982 4	Preston Makedonia	3–1	Brisbane City	Melbourne
	Brown 65', 87'; Ollerton 75'	Report	Carey 68'	Stadium: B.T. Connor Reserve; Attendance: 4,000; Referee: Stewart Mellings

14 March 1982 5	Brisbane City	3–1	Wollongong City	Brisbane
	Kelso 42'; Conner 59'; Carey 84'	Report	Fontana 34'	Stadium: Spencer Park; Attendance: 2,600; Referee: Bill Monteverde

21 March 1982 6	South Melbourne	4–0	Brisbane City	Melbourne
	Egan 65', 84'; Campbell 36' (pen.); Wooddin 63'	Report		Stadium: Middle Park Soccer Stadium; Attendance: 4,000; Referee: Dennis Voutsinas

28 March 1982 7	Brisbane City	2–1	Sydney City	Brisbane
	Palinkas 60'; Bohan 75'	Report	Patikas 68'	Stadium: Spencer Park; Attendance: 2,600; Referee: Jim Reeves

4 April 1982 8	West Adelaide	3–0	Brisbane City	Adelaide
	Heys 67'; Brown 71'; Santrac 73'	Report		Stadium: Hindmarsh Stadium; Attendance: 4,100; Referee: Don Campbell

11 April 1982 9	Brisbane City	1–1	APIA Leichhardt	Brisbane
	Palinkas 13'	Report	Bohan 18' (o.g.)	Stadium: Spencer Park; Attendance: 2,600; Referee: Col Amos

18 April 1982 10	Sydney Olympic	5–0	Brisbane City	Sydney
	Koussas 5', 69', 86'; Katholos 12'; Rowden 28'	Report		Stadium: Pratten Park; Attendance: 6,740; Referee: Peter Rampley

25 April 1982 11	Footscray JUST	2–0	Brisbane City	Melbourne
	Simic 48', 67'	Report		Stadium: Schintler Reserve; Attendance: 1,652; Referee: Jim Fearn

2 May 1982 12	Brisbane City	1–3	Canberra City	Brisbane
	Carey ?'	Report	T. Byrne ?'; Purdie ?'; MacLaren ?'	Stadium: Spencer Park; Attendance: 1,800; Referee: Bill Monteverde

8 May 1982 13	Newcastle KB United	0–0	Brisbane City	Newcastle
		Report		Stadium: Newcastle International Sports Centre; Attendance: 2,983; Referee: Jim Reeves (Otto Scevak 53')

16 May 1982 14	Brisbane City	2–2	Heidelberg United	Brisbane
	Glockner 5'; Conner ?' (pen.)	Report	Paton 73', 75'	Stadium: Spencer Park; Attendance: 2,000; Referee: Dave Nugent

22 May 1982 15	St George-Budapest	1–0	Brisbane City	Sydney
	Marton 17'	Report		Stadium: St George Stadium; Attendance: 1,754; Referee: Richard Lorenc

30 May 1982 16	Brisbane City	2–0	Marconi Fairfield	Brisbane
	Glockner 6', 75'	Report		Stadium: Spencer Park; Attendance: 1,400; Referee: Bill Monteverde

6 June 1982 17	Adelaide City	2–0	Brisbane City	Adelaide
	Russell 4'; Flounders 52'	Report		Stadium: Olympic Sports Field; Attendance: 2,200; Referee: Jim Rossis

13 June 1982 18	Brisbane City	1–2	Preston Makedonia	Brisbane
	Hamilton 26'	Report	Whittle 19'; Ollerton 61'	Stadium: Spencer Park; Attendance: 1,400; Referee: Alan Kibbler

20 June 1982 19	Brisbane Lions	1–3	Brisbane City	Brisbane
	Wright 20'	Report	Conner 30' (pen.); Tokesi 43'; Bohan 54'	Stadium: Richlands Stadium; Attendance: 2,148; Referee: Bill Monteverde

27 June 1982 20	Brisbane City	1–1	South Melbourne	Brisbane
	Bohan 57'	Report	Buljevic 63'	Stadium: Spencer Park; Attendance: 1,800; Referee: Tim Davies

4 July 1982 21	Sydney City	5–2	Brisbane City	Sydney
	Patikas 10'; Kosmina 39' (pen.), 51', 61' (pen.), 79'	Report	Bohan 43'; Palinkas 51'	Stadium: ES Marks Athletics Field; Attendance: 1,018; Referee: Doug Rennie

11 July 1982 22	Brisbane City	4–1	West Adelaide	Brisbane
	Bohan 20'; Hamilton 52'; Hermiston 81' (pen.); Conner 88'	Report	Honeyman 13'	Stadium: Spencer Park; Attendance: 1,800; Referee: Doug Rennie

18 July 1982 23	APIA Leichardt	1–1	Brisbane City	Sydney
	Carter 85' (pen.)	Report	Palinkas 61'	Stadium: Lambert Park; Attendance: 2,483; Referee: Ken Small

25 July 1982 24	Brisbane City	1–1	Sydney Olympic	Brisbane
	Pimblett 60'	Report	Koussas 34'	Stadium: Spencer Park; Attendance: 2,000; Referee: Col Amos

1 August 1982 25	Brisbane City	0–0	Footscray JUST	Brisbane
		Report		Stadium: Spencer Park; Attendance: 1,200; Referee: Gary Power

8 August 1982 26	Canberra City	1–0	Brisbane City	Canberra
	MacLaren 77'	Report		Stadium: Bruce Stadium; Attendance: 550; Referee: Doug Rennie

15 August 1982 27	Brisbane City	1–1	Newcastle KB United	Brisbane
	Cairney 8'	Report	Lowe 68'	Stadium: Spencer Park; Attendance: 1,200; Referee: Alan Kibbler

22 August 1982 28	Heidelberg United	1–0	Brisbane City	Melbourne
	Paton 53'	Report		Stadium: Olympic Village; Attendance: 3,000; Referee: Stewart Mellings

29 August 1982 29	Brisbane City	2–2	St George-Budapest	Brisbane
	Cairney 26', 87'	Report	MacDougall 8'; Slater 90+2'	Stadium: Spencer Park; Attendance: 1,200; Referee: Bob Mee

5 September 1982 30	Wollongong City	3–1	Brisbane City	Wollongong
	Fleming 62'; Fontana 77'; O'Connor 86'	Report	Kelso 57'	Stadium: Wollongong Showground; Attendance: 4,122; Referee: Tim Davies

=== NSL Cup ===
14 June 1982 First round	Brisbane Lions	1–0	Brisbane City	Brisbane
	Williamson 75'	Report		Stadium: Perry Park; Attendance: Referee: Dave Nugent

== Statistics ==
=== Appearances and goals ===
Includes all competitions. Players with no appearances not included in the list.

No.	Pos.	Nat.	Player	National Soccer League		NSL Cup		Total	
No.	Pos.	Nat.	Player	Apps	Goals	Apps	Goals	Apps	Goals
—	FW	(Australia)	Bevan Bohan	20+2	5	1	0	23	5
—	MF	(Scotland)	Joe Cairney	9+4	3	0	0	13	3
—		(Australia)	Peter Carey	11+3	3	1	0	15	3
—	GK	(Australia)	Martin Coe	3	0	0	0	3	0
—	FW	(Australia)	Willie Conner	23	4	1	0	24	4
—	DF	(Republic of Ireland)	Jimmy Dunne	10	0	0	0	10	0
—		(Australia)	Steve Glockner	14+4	3	0	0	18	3
—	MF	(Scotland)	Bobby Hamilton	29+1	2	0	0	30	2
—	DF	(Scotland)	Jim Hermiston	19	1	1	0	20	1
—	FW	(Australia)	Barry Kelso	11+1	3	0	0	12	3
—	DF	(Scotland)	Frank Liddell	26	0	1	0	27	0
—	MF	(Scotland)	John McVeigh	29	0	1	0	30	0
—	MF	(Australia)	Dave Osborne	1+1	0	0	0	2	0
—	FW	(Hungary)	Joe Palinkas	15+4	4	1	0	20	4
—	DF	(Australia)	Steve Perry	22	0	0	0	22	0
—	GK	(Australia)	Tony Pezzano	18	0	1	0	19	0
—	MF	(England)	Frank Pimblett	30	2	1	0	31	2
—	DF	(Australia)	Peter Tokesi	19	1	1	0	20	1
—	MF	(Australia)	David Vincenzino	7+3	0	1	0	11	0
—	DF	(Scotland)	Billy Wilkinson	5	1	0	0	5	1
—	GK	(Australia)	Kim Wishart	9	0	0	0	9	0

=== Disciplinary record ===
Includes all competitions. The list is sorted by squad number when total cards are equal. Players with no cards not included in the list.

Rank	No.	Pos.	Nat.	Player	National Soccer League			NSL Cup			Total		
Rank	No.	Pos.	Nat.	Player	Yellow card	Second yellow card	Red card	Yellow card	Second yellow card	Red card	Yellow card	Second yellow card	Red card
1	—	MF	(Scotland)	Joe Cairney	1	0	1	0	0	0	1	0	1
1	—	MF	(England)	Frank Pimblett	1	0	1	0	0	0	1	0	1
3	—	DF	(Scotland)	Jim Hermiston	0	0	1	0	0	0	0	0	1
4	—	DF	(Scotland)	Frank Liddell	5	0	0	0	0	0	5	0	0
5	—	FW	(Australia)	Barry Kelso	3	0	0	0	0	0	3	0	0
6	—	FW	(Australia)	Steve Glockner	2	0	0	0	0	0	2	0	0
6	—	MF	(Australia)	John McVeigh	2	0	0	0	0	0	2	0	0
6	—	FW	(Hungary)	Joe Palinkas	2	0	0	0	0	0	2	0	0
6	—	GK	(Australia)	Tony Pezzano	2	0	0	0	0	0	2	0	0
10	—	FW	(Australia)	Bevan Bohan	1	0	0	0	0	0	1	0	0
10	—	MF	(Australia)	David Vincenzino	1	0	0	0	0	0	1	0	0
10	—	DF	(Scotland)	Billy Wilkinson	1	0	0	0	0	0	1	0	0
Total					21	0	3	0	0	0	21	0	3

=== Clean sheets ===
Includes all competitions. The list is sorted by squad number when total clean sheets are equal. Numbers in parentheses represent games where both goalkeepers participated and both kept a clean sheet; the number in parentheses is awarded to the goalkeeper who was substituted on, whilst a full clean sheet is awarded to the goalkeeper who was on the field at the start of play. Goalkeepers with no clean sheets not included in the list.

Rank	No.	Nat.	Goalkeeper	NSL	NSL Cup	Total
1	—	(Australia)	Tony Pezzano	1	0	1
