= Alan Kay (disambiguation) =

Alan Kay is a computer scientist known for his work at the Xerox Palo Alto Research Center.

Alan Kay may also refer to:

- Alan Kay (judge), US magistrate judge in Washington DC
- Alan Cooke Kay (born 1932), US District Court judge for the District of Hawaii
- Alan Kay (footballer) (born 1961), Scottish footballer
- Alan Kay, season 1 winner of the TV series Alone

== See also ==
- Alan Kaye (disambiguation)
- Allen Kay (born 1945), American advertising executive
- Allan K. (born 1958), Filipino entertainer
