= 1987–88 Scottish First Division =

Scottish First Division
- Season: 1987–88
- Champions: Hamilton Academical
- Promoted: Hamilton Academical
- Relegated: East Fife; Dumbarton
- Matches played: 264
- Goals scored: 765 (2.9 per match)
- Top goalscorer: Gordon Dalziel (25)
- Biggest home win: Raith Rovers 7–1 East Fife, 07.11.1987
- Biggest away win: Hamilton Academical 1–5 Meadowbank, 27.10.1987

The 1987–88 Scottish First Division season was won by Hamilton Academical, who were promoted four points ahead of Meadowbank Thistle. East Fife and Dumbarton were relegated to the Second Division.

== League table ==
Pos	Team	Pld	W	D	L	GF	GA	GD	Pts	Promotion or relegation
1	Hamilton Academical (C, P)	44	22	12	10	67	39	+28	56	Promotion to the Premier Division
2	Meadowbank Thistle	44	20	12	12	71	37	+34	52	
3	Clydebank	44	21	7	16	59	61	−2	49	
4	Forfar Athletic	44	16	16	12	67	58	+9	48	
5	Raith Rovers	44	19	7	18	81	76	+5	45	
6	Airdrieonians	44	16	13	15	65	68	−3	45	
7	Queen of the South	44	14	15	15	56	67	−11	43	
8	Partick Thistle	44	16	9	19	60	64	−4	41	
9	Clyde	44	16	6	22	73	75	−2	38	
10	Kilmarnock	44	13	11	20	55	60	−5	37	
11	East Fife (R)	44	13	10	21	61	76	−15	36	Relegation to the Second Division
12	Dumbarton (R)	44	12	12	20	51	70	−19	36	Relegation to the Second Division

Source: RSSSF and statto
Rules for classification: 1) points; 2) goal difference; 3) number of goals scored.
(C) Champions; (P) Promoted; (R) Relegated
