= Alan Kaye =

Alan Kaye may refer to:

- Alan S. Kaye (1944–2007), American linguist
- Alan Kaye (engineer) (fl. 1963), British engineer who described the Kaye effect
- Alan Kaye (referee), football referee; see 2003 Football League play-offs
- Alan Kaye (fl. 1980s–1990s), American disk jockey with WGTZ in Dayton, Ohio

== See also ==
- Alan Kay (disambiguation)
