= 1991–92 Scottish Second Division =

Scottish Second Division
- Season: 1991–92
- Champions: Dumbarton
- Promoted: Dumbarton; Cowdenbeath

The 1991–92 Scottish Second Division was won by Dumbarton who, along with second placed Cowdenbeath, were promoted to the First Division. Albion Rovers finished bottom.

== Table ==
| Pos | Team | Pld | W | D | L | GF | GA | GD | Pts | Promotion |
|---|---|---|---|---|---|---|---|---|---|---|
| 1 | Dumbarton (C, P) | 39 | 20 | 12 | 7 | 65 | 37 | +28 | 52 | Promotion to the First Division |
| 2 | Cowdenbeath (P) | 39 | 22 | 7 | 10 | 74 | 52 | +22 | 51 | Promotion to the First Division |
| 3 | Alloa Athletic | 39 | 20 | 10 | 9 | 58 | 38 | +20 | 50 | |
| 4 | East Fife | 39 | 19 | 11 | 9 | 72 | 57 | +15 | 49 | |
| 5 | Clyde | 39 | 18 | 7 | 14 | 61 | 43 | +18 | 43 | |
| 6 | East Stirlingshire | 39 | 15 | 11 | 13 | 61 | 70 | −9 | 41 | |
| 7 | Arbroath | 39 | 12 | 14 | 13 | 49 | 48 | +1 | 38 | |
| 8 | Brechin City | 39 | 13 | 12 | 14 | 54 | 55 | −1 | 38 | |
| 9 | Queen's Park | 39 | 14 | 7 | 18 | 59 | 63 | −4 | 35 | |
| 10 | Stranraer | 39 | 13 | 9 | 17 | 46 | 56 | −10 | 35 | |
| 11 | Queen of the South | 39 | 14 | 5 | 20 | 71 | 86 | −15 | 33 | |
| 12 | Berwick Rangers | 39 | 10 | 11 | 18 | 50 | 65 | −15 | 31 | |
| 13 | Stenhousemuir | 39 | 11 | 8 | 20 | 46 | 57 | −11 | 30 | |
| 14 | Albion Rovers | 39 | 5 | 10 | 24 | 42 | 81 | −39 | 20 | |

Source: "1991-1992 Second Division - SPFL Archive". SPFL.
Rules for classification: 1) points; 2) goal difference; 3) number of goals scored.
(C) Champions; (P) Promoted
