= Andy Willock =

English footballer

Personal information
- Full name: Andrew Willock
- Date of birth: 13 January 1964 (age 62)
- Place of birth: Southend, England
- Position: Winger

Senior career*
Years	Team	Apps	(Gls)
1981–1982	Coventry City	0	(0)
1982–1983	Rangers	0	(0)
1983	Mount Wellington		
1983–1989	Clyde	219	(33)
1989–1991	Ayr United	31	(1)
1991–1993	Dumbarton	39	(7)
1993–1995	Alloa Athletic	38	(4)
1995–1996	Albion Rovers	17	(2)
Total		344	(47)
- * Club domestic league appearances and goals

Andy Willock (born 13 January 1964) is an English former football midfielder.

Willock began his career with Coventry City, but did not make a first team appearance, and joined Rangers. He did not play for the Glasgow club either, and played in New Zealand in 1983 for University-Mount Wellington. He returned to Scotland and joined Clyde, where he had the best spell of his career, making over 200 appearances. He left Clyde in 1989 and had two year spells at Ayr United, Dumbarton and Alloa Athletic, before playing his final season with Albion Rovers.
