= Mark Nelson (footballer) =

Scottish footballer

Personal information
- Full name: Mark John Nelson
- Date of birth: 9 August 1969 (age 57)
- Place of birth: Bellshill, Scotland
- Position: Defender

Senior career*
Years	Team	Apps	(Gls)
1987–1989	Airdrieonians	27	(0)
1989–1992	Stenhousemuir	43	(6)
1992–1994	Dumbarton	29	(1)
1994–2000	Alloa Athletic	135	(2)
2000–2003	Hamilton Academical	68	(5)
Total		302	(14)
- * Club domestic league appearances and goals

Mark John Nelson (born 9 August 1969, in Bellshill) is a Scottish former professional footballer who made more than 300 appearances in the Scottish Football League playing as a defender.
