= Bernie Grant (footballer) =

Scottish footballer

Personal information
- Full name: Bernard Grant
- Date of birth: 6 August 1962 (age 64)
- Place of birth: Rutherglen, Scotland
- Position: Midfielder

Youth career
- Celtic BC

Senior career*
Years	Team	Apps	(Gls)
1979–1981	Morton		
1983–1985	Motherwell	5	(1)
1984–1987	Stirling Albion	48	(1)
1989–1990	Dumbarton	7	(0)
- * Club domestic league appearances and goals

Bernard Grant (born 6 August 1962) is a Scottish footballer who played for Dumbarton, East Fife, East Stirlingshire and Ayr United.
