= Joe Cairney =

Scottish footballer

Personal information
- Date of birth: 8 November 1956 (age 69)
- Place of birth: Coatbridge, Scotland
- Date of death: 2009 (aged 52–53)
- Place of death: Glasgow, Scotland
- Position: Forward

Youth career
- Wishaw

Senior career*
Years	Team	Apps	(Gls)
1976–1978	Airdrieonians	55	(30)
1978–1981	Kilmarnock	53	(11)
1982–1983	Brisbane City	27	(5)
1984–1985	Brisbane Lions	24	(12)
Total		159	(58)
- * Club domestic league appearances and goals

Joe Cairney (1956 – 2009) was a Scottish footballer, who played in the Scottish Football League for Airdrieonians and Kilmarnock.

Cairney was part of the Airdrieonians team that won the Spring Cup in 1976. He later emigrated to Australia, along with former teammate John McVeigh, and played for Brisbane City and Brisbane Lions.
