= Jim Cowell (Scottish footballer) =

Scottish footballer

Personal information
- Full name: James Cowell
- Date of birth: 28 July 1958 (age 68)
- Place of birth: Bellshill, Scotland
- Positions: Midfielder; winger

Youth career
- Lanark United

Senior career*
Years	Team	Apps	(Gls)
1982–1983	Albion Rovers	2	(0)
1984–1985	Hearts	1	(0)
1985–1986	East Stirlingshire	1	(0)
1985–1990	Ayr United	125	(14)
1989–1990	Clyde	10	(0)
1989–1991	Falkirk	12	(0)
1990–1992	East Fife	22	(0)
1991–1993	Dumbarton	15	(0)
- * Club domestic league appearances and goals

James Cowell (born 28 July 1961) is a Scottish former footballer who played for Albion Rovers, Hearts, East Stirlingshire, Ayr United, Clyde, Falkirk, East Fife and Dumbarton.
