= 1986–87 Scottish First Division =

Scottish First Division
- Season: 1986–87
- Champions: Morton
- Promoted: Morton; Dunfermline Athletic
- Relegated: Brechin City; Montrose
- Matches played: 264
- Goals scored: 693 (2.63 per match)
- Top goalscorer: Rowan Alexander (23)

The 1986–87 Scottish First Division season was won by Morton, who were promoted along with Dunfermline Athletic to the Premier Division. Brechin City and Montrose were relegated to the Second Division.

== League table ==
Pos	Team	Pld	W	D	L	GF	GA	GD	Pts	Promotion or relegation
1	Morton (C, P)	44	24	9	11	88	56	+32	57	Promotion to the Premier Division
2	Dunfermline Athletic (P)	44	23	10	11	61	41	+20	56	Promotion to the Premier Division
3	Dumbarton	44	23	7	14	67	52	+15	53	
4	East Fife	44	15	21	8	68	55	+13	51	
5	Airdrieonians	44	20	11	13	58	46	+12	51	
6	Kilmarnock	44	17	11	16	62	53	+9	45	
7	Forfar Athletic	44	14	15	15	61	63	−2	43	
8	Partick Thistle	44	12	15	17	49	54	−5	39	
9	Clyde	44	11	16	17	48	56	−8	38	
10	Queen of the South	44	11	12	21	50	71	−21	34	
11	Brechin City (R)	44	11	10	23	44	72	−28	32	Relegation to the Second Division
12	Montrose (R)	44	9	11	24	37	74	−37	29	Relegation to the Second Division

Source: RSSSF and statto
Rules for classification: 1) points; 2) goal difference; 3) number of goals scored.
(C) Champions; (P) Promoted; (R) Relegated
