= Dom Callan =

Scottish footballer

Personal information
- Full name: Dominic Callan
- Date of birth: 20 September 1966 (age 60)
- Place of birth: Glasgow, Scotland
- Position: Full back

Youth career
- Kilbowie Union

Senior career*
Years	Team	Apps	(Gls)
1988–1989	Dumbarton	5	(0)
1990–1997	Queen's Park	97	(3)
- * Club domestic league appearances and goals

Dominic Callan (born 20 September 1966) was a Scottish footballer who played for Dumbarton and Queen's Park. He now coaches a youth team, St.Cadocs Thistle.
