= John Creaney =

Northern Irish Q.C., prosecutor; former British Army officer

John Alexander Creaney, QC, TA, OBE, DL (29 July 1933 – 3 June 2008) was a Northern Ireland QC, later named Senior Prosecuting Counsel at Belfast Crown Court, beginning in 1978.

Creaney was born in Armagh City, County Armagh to a World War II veteran father who worked as a bus driver. Creaney attended the Royal School, Armagh and Queen's University, Belfast (QUB). He followed in his father's footsteps by joining the Territorial Army's Officer Training Corps (OTC). Creaney helped raise the RIR 5th Battalion for NATO service, keeping the soldiers for the most part out of The Troubles, although Creaney himself was intimidated from his home in South Belfast due to threats from both republican and loyalist paramilitaries, beginning in the 1970s.

== Legal career ==
Creaney was a pupil of Basil Kelly and began his legal career in 1957, after being called to the Bar. In 1968, he was appointed Junior Crown Counsel for County Antrim, and was named a QC five years later, taking silk in 1973.

In the latter part of his career, Creaney became the resident Senior Prosecuting Counsel appearing for the Crown instructed by the NI DPP (now PPS) in trials held at Crumlin road Courthouse, Belfast. Creaney was very successful, rarely losing a case and was highly respected by both prosecution and defence.

== Cases ==
Creaney oversaw or worked on numerous notable trials/prosecutions, including the following:

- 1966: Malvern Street killings
- 1991: Danny Morrison (Irish republican)
- 1992: Brian Nelson (Northern Irish loyalist)
- 1996 John Torney - Policeman accused of murder of his wife, son and daughter. Torney's case was that his son had committed the murders then killed himself. Torney died in prison after conviction and the loss of an appeal to the Belfast High Court, still protesting his innocence.
- 2005: Abbas Boutrab case, Northern Ireland's first al-Qa'eda-related trial

== Deputy Lieutenancy ==
He later served as a Deputy Lieutenant of County Down.

== Personal life/death ==
In 1957, he married Evelyn McCormack; the couple had three daughters. Creaney died at his home in Cultra in 2008, aged 74, from leukaemia.
