= Arthur Grant (footballer) =

Scottish footballer (born 1957)

Personal information
- Full name: Arthur Grant
- Date of birth: 10 June 1957 (age 69)
- Place of birth: Bellshill, Scotland
- Position: Winger

Youth career
- Fernhill Athletic

Senior career*
Years	Team	Apps	(Gls)
1975–1980	Clyde	109	(11)
1980–1983	Alloa Athletic	101	(18)
1983–1984	Falkirk	28	(6)
1984	Hamilton Academical	6	(0)
1984–1986	Stenhousemuir	43	(4)
1986–1987	Dumbarton	25	(0)
1987–1990	East Stirlingshire	95	(9)
1990–1991	Alloa Athletic	27	(3)
Total		434	(51)
- * Club domestic league appearances and goals

Arthur Grant (born 10 June 1957 in Bellshill) is a Scottish former football winger.

Grant began his career with Clyde, and made over 100 appearances with the club, before moving to Alloa Athletic. He reached 100 appearances for the "Wasps" as well, and had spells with Falkirk, Hamilton Academical, Stenhousemuir, Dumbarton and East Stirlingshire, before finishing his career with Alloa.
