= Jim Creaney =

Scottish footballer

Personal information
- Full name: James Creaney
- Date of birth: 26 October 1964 (age 62)
- Place of birth: Glasgow, Scotland
- Positions: Midfielder; forward

Youth career
- St Anthonys

Senior career*
Years	Team	Apps	(Gls)
1984–1986	Albion Rovers	19	(0)
1986–1987	Queen of the South	1	(0)
1986–1988	Stranraer	21	(5)
1987–1988	Dumbarton	4	(0)
- * Club domestic league appearances and goals

James Creaney (born 26 October 1964) was a Scottish footballer who played for Albion Rovers, Queen of the South, Stranraer and Dumbarton.
