= Pat Cairney =

Scottish footballer

Personal information
- Full name: Pat Cairney
- Date of birth: 4 June 1959 (age 67)
- Place of birth: Glasgow, Scotland
- Position: Centre half

Youth career
- Yoker Athletic

Senior career*
Years	Team	Apps	(Gls)
1977–1978	Airdrie	5	(0)
1978–1979	Stranraer	14	(0)
1988–1990	Dumbarton	47	(3)
- * Club domestic league appearances and goals

Pat Cairney (born 4 June 1959) was a Scottish footballer who played for Airdrie, Stranraer and Dumbarton.
