= Jim Hughes (footballer, born 1960) =

Scottish footballer

Personal information
- Date of birth: 9 January 1958 (age 68)
- Place of birth: Glasgow, Scotland
- Positions: Midfielder; forward

Youth career
- Clyde Valley

Senior career*
Years	Team	Apps	(Gls)
1978–1981	Kilmarnock	27	(5)
1982–1983	East Stirlingshire	2	(0)
1985–1987	Falkirk	41	(4)
1987–1989	Queen of the South	47	(18)
1988–1990	Clydebank	25	(4)
1989–1993	Dumbarton	40	(7)
- * Club domestic league appearances and goals

Jim Hughes (born 9 January 1960) was a Scottish footballer who played for Kilmarnock, East Stirlingshire, Falkirk, Queen of the South, Clydebank, and Dumbarton.
