= Andy McQuade (footballer) =

Scottish footballer

Personal information
- Full name: William Andrew McQuade
- Date of birth: 27 August 1959 (age 67)
- Place of birth: Johnstone, Scotland
- Position: Midfielder

Youth career
- Hillwood BC

Senior career*
Years	Team	Apps	(Gls)
1977–1981	Hamilton Academical	9	(0)
1988–1990	Dumbarton	56	(3)
1992–1993	Albion Rovers	7	(0)
- * Club domestic league appearances and goals

William Andrew McQuade (born 27 August 1959) is a Scottish former footballer, who played for Hamilton Academical, Dumbarton and Albion Rovers.
