= Jim Dempsey (footballer, born 1959) =

Scottish footballer

Personal information
- Full name: James Dempsey
- Date of birth: 28 July 1959 (age 67)
- Place of birth: Bellshill, Scotland
- Height: 6 ft 2 in (1.88 m)
- Position: Centre half

Youth career
- Lanark United

Senior career*
Years	Team	Apps	(Gls)
1978–1980	Motherwell	20	(0)
1980–1984	Clyde	145	(5)
1984–1988	Falkirk	135	(9)
1988–1990	Partick Thistle	35	(1)
1989–1993	Dumbarton	98	(1)
1992–1993	Stirling Albion	4	(0)
1993–1994	Alloa Athletic	3	(0)

Managerial career
- 2005–2007: Troon
- * Club domestic league appearances and goals

James Dempsey (born 28 July 1959) was a Scottish footballer who played for Motherwell, Clyde, Falkirk, Partick Thistle, Dumbarton, Stirling Albion and Alloa Athletic.
