= Colin Spence =

Scottish footballer

Personal information
- Full name: Colin Spence
- Date of birth: 7 January 1960 (age 66)
- Place of birth: Glasgow, Scotland
- Positions: Midfielder; forward

Senior career*
Years	Team	Apps	(Gls)
1976–1979	Crewe Alexandra	18	(1)
1979–1981	Falkirk	29	(9)
1981–1982	Alloa Athletic	5	(0)
1982–1983	Stenhousemuir	6	(0)
1983–198?	Yoker Athletic		
198?–1988	Petershill		
1988–1991	Dumbarton	57	(8)
- * Club domestic league appearances and goals

Colin Spence (born 7 January 1960) was a Scottish footballer who played for Crewe Alexandra, Falkirk, Alloa Athletic, Stenhousemuir, Yoker Athletic, Petershill and Dumbarton.
