= Willie Cairns =

Scottish footballer

Personal information
- Full name: William Robert Cairns
- Date of birth: 8 April 1961 (age 65)
- Place of birth: Glasgow, Scotland
- Position: Full back

Youth career
- Clydebank Strollers

Senior career*
Years	Team	Apps	(Gls)
1980–1986	Queen's Park	105	(2)
1985–1988	Partick Thistle	38	(1)
1987–1989	Dumbarton	27	(0)
- * Club domestic league appearances and goals

William Robert Cairns (born 8 April 1961) was a Scottish footballer who played for Queen's Park, Partick Thistle and Dumbarton in the 1980s.
