= Billy Blackie =

Scottish footballer (born 1963)

Personal information
- Full name: William Blackie
- Date of birth: 4 October 1963 (age 63)
- Place of birth: Edinburgh, Scotland
- Position: Forward

Youth career
- Melbourne Thistle

Senior career*
Years	Team	Apps	(Gls)
1982–1983	Dunfermline Athletic	17	(9)
1985–1985	Berwick Rangers	2	(4)
1985–1987	Cowdenbeath	24	(19)
1987–1988	Forfar Athletic	34	(14)
1987–1989	Dumbarton	13	(0)
1988–1990	Alloa Athletic	22	(13)
1989–1992	St Johnstone	18	(0)
- * Club domestic league appearances and goals

William Blackie (born 4 October 1963) was a Scottish footballer who played for Dunfermline Athletic, Berwick Rangers, Cowdenbeath, Forfar Athletic, Dumbarton, Alloa Athletic and St Johnstone.
