= Jamie Doyle (footballer, born 1961) =

Scottish footballer

Personal information
- Date of birth: 1 October 1961 (age 65)
- Place of birth: Glasgow, Scotland
- Position: Midfielder

Youth career
- Auchengill Boys Club

Senior career*
Years	Team	Apps	(Gls)
1978–1984	Partick Thistle	154	(10)
1984–1987	Motherwell	37	(1)
1987–1988	Partick Thistle	2	(0)
1988–1990	Dumbarton	35	(2)
- Glenafton Athletic

International career
1980–1982	Scotland U21	3	(0)
1980	Scottish League XI	1	(0)
- * Club domestic league appearances and goals

Jamie Doyle (born 1 October 1961) is a Scottish former professional footballer, who played for Partick Thistle, Motherwell and Dumbarton in the Scottish Football League.

His younger brother Gerry was also a footballer who played for Partick Thistle in the same period, and was later a teammate at Dumbarton.
