= Craig Cranmer =

Scottish footballer

Personal information
- Full name: Craig Cranmer
- Date of birth: 21 February 1968 (age 58)
- Place of birth: Johnstone, Scotland
- Height: 6 ft 3 in (1.91 m)
- Position: Defender

Senior career*
Years	Team	Apps	(Gls)
1987–1989	Dumbarton	27	(0)
1989–1990	Renfrew		
1990–1991	Partick Thistle	0	(0)
1991–1992	Albion Rovers	13	(0)
1993–1998	Pollok		
1998–2002	Clyde	96	(5)
- * Club domestic league appearances and goals

Craig Cranmer is a Scottish former footballer who played as a defender.

Cranmer was a youth player with Duntocher Boys Club from 1976 to 1986, during which time they won the Scottish Juvenile Cup and the Scottish Youth Football Cup at Hampden Park. He joined Dumbarton in 1987, making 27 first team appearances in the Scottish Football League until 1989. After a spell with Renfrew he then returned to the senior level and joined Partick Thistle for a season, but left without making a first team appearance before joining Albion Rovers for season 1991–92, making 13 league appearances.

After a break from playing due to work commitments he joined Pollok Juniors where he made over 120 first team appearances and scored over 20 goals. During his time at Pollok he won the Scottish Junior Cup in 1997 and was capped for Scotland Juniors in 1998 at the International Tournament in Sligo, Ireland.

He joined SFL Second Division club Clyde in 1998, making over 100 appearances and scoring 7 goals. He left Clyde in March 2002 due to work commitments and retired from football. Scorer of two goals on the day Clyde clinched the 1999–2000 Scottish Second Division title against Arbroath, "Boomer" had been struggling to train due to work commitments and felt that it was unfair to take a wage from the club. Clyde later said on their website that they were full of praise for the manner in which Cranmer had handled the situation and considered what was best for the club, and that he had always been a popular player and left with the good wishes of all the supporters.

== Honours ==
Pollok

- Scottish Junior Cup: 1996–97
  - Runner-up: 1997–98
- Central Premier Division: 1994–95, 1995–96
- West of Scotland Cup: 1997–98
- Central Sectional League Cup: 1996–97

Clyde

- Scottish Second Division: 1999–2000
