= Graham Duncan (footballer) =

Scottish footballer

Personal information
- Date of birth: 2 February 1969 (age 57)
- Place of birth: Glasgow, Scotland
- Positions: Midfielder; forward

Youth career
- Eadie Star

Senior career*
Years	Team	Apps	(Gls)
1988–1989	Dumbarton	18	(2)
1989–1997	Stranraer	255	(26)
1997–2000	Albion Rovers	41	(5)
1999–2000	Queen of the South	13	(1)
2000–2001	Queen's Park	17	(0)
- * Club domestic league appearances and goals

Graham Duncan (born 2 February 1969) was a Scottish footballer who played for Dumbarton, Stranraer, Albion Rovers, Queen of the South and Queen's Park.
