= 1988–89 Scottish Second Division =

Scottish Second Division
- Season: 1988–89
- Champions: Albion Rovers
- Promoted: Albion Rovers; Alloa Athletic

The 1988–89 Scottish Second Division was won by Albion Rovers who, along with second placed Alloa Athletic, were promoted to the First Division. Stenhousemuir finished bottom.

== Table ==
Pos	Team	Pld	W	D	L	GF	GA	GD	Pts	Promotion
1	Albion Rovers (C, P)	39	21	8	10	65	48	+17	50	Promotion to the First Division
2	Alloa Athletic (P)	39	17	11	11	66	48	+18	45	Promotion to the First Division
3	Brechin City	39	15	13	11	58	49	+9	43	
4	Stirling Albion	39	15	12	12	64	55	+9	42	
5	East Fife	39	14	13	12	55	54	+1	41	
6	Montrose	39	15	11	13	54	55	−1	41	
7	Queen's Park	39	10	18	11	50	49	+1	38	
8	Cowdenbeath	39	13	14	12	48	52	−4	40	
9	East Stirlingshire	39	13	11	15	54	58	−4	37	
10	Arbroath	39	11	15	13	56	63	−7	37	
11	Stranraer	39	12	12	15	58	63	−5	36	
12	Dumbarton	39	12	10	17	45	55	−10	34	
13	Berwick Rangers	39	10	13	16	50	59	−9	33	
14	Stenhousemuir	39	9	11	19	44	59	−15	29	

Rules for classification: 1) points; 2) goal difference; 3) number of goals scored.
(C) Champions; (P) Promoted
