= Gerry Doyle (Scottish footballer) =

Scottish footballer (born 1965)

Personal information
- Full name: Gerald Joseph Doyle
- Date of birth: 17 February 1965 (age 61)
- Place of birth: Glasgow, Scotland
- Positions: Midfielder; forward

Youth career
- Auchengill Star

Senior career*
Years	Team	Apps	(Gls)
1980–1985	Partick Thistle	49	(0)
1985–1986	Alloa Athletic	13	(0)
1986–1987	Stranraer	9	(0)
1987–1989	Dumbarton	28	(0)
- * Club domestic league appearances and goals

Gerald Joseph Doyle (born 17 February 1965) is a Scottish former footballer who played for Partick Thistle, Alloa Athletic, Stranraer and Dumbarton.

His elder brother Jamie was also a footballer who played for Partick Thistle in the same period, and was later a teammate at Dumbarton.
