= Gary Dickie =

Scottish footballer

Garry Dickie
Personal information
- Full name: Garry John Dickie
- Place of birth: Glasgow, Scotland
- Position: Left back

Youth career
- Eastercraigs

Senior career*
Years	Team	Apps	(Gls)
1980–1983	Morton		
1983–1984	East Stirling	5	(0)
1983–1984	Albion Rovers	3	(0)
1986–1987	East Stirling	21	(0)
1988–1990	Dumbarton	30	(0)
- * Club domestic league appearances and goals

Gary John Dickie was a Scottish footballer who played for Morton, East Stirling, Albion Rovers and Dumbarton.
