= 1989–90 Scottish First Division =

Scottish First Division
- Season: 1989–90
- Champions: St Johnstone
- Promoted: St Johnstone
- Relegated: Albion Rovers; Alloa Athletic
- Matches played: 273
- Goals scored: 763 (2.79 per match)
- Top goalscorer: Ken Eadie (21)
- Biggest home win: Forfar Athletic 1–5 St Johnstone, 02.01.1990
- Biggest away win: Falkirk 6–0 Albion Rovers, 30.09.1989

The 1989–90 Scottish First Division season was won by St Johnstone, who were promoted four points ahead of Airdrieonians to the Premier Division. Albion Rovers and Alloa Athletic were relegated to the Second Division.

== League table ==
Pos	Team	Pld	W	D	L	GF	GA	GD	Pts	Promotion or relegation
1	St Johnstone (C, P)	39	25	8	6	81	39	+42	58	Promotion to the Premier Division
2	Airdrieonians	39	23	8	8	77	45	+32	54	
3	Clydebank	39	17	10	12	74	64	+10	44	
4	Falkirk	39	14	15	10	59	46	+13	43	
5	Raith Rovers	39	15	12	12	57	50	+7	42	
6	Hamilton Academical	39	14	13	12	52	53	−1	41	
7	Meadowbank Thistle	39	13	13	13	41	46	−5	39	
8	Partick Thistle	39	12	14	13	62	53	+9	38	
9	Clyde	39	10	15	14	39	46	−7	35	
10	Ayr United	39	11	13	15	41	62	−21	35	
11	Morton	39	9	16	14	38	46	−8	34	
12	Forfar Athletic	39	8	15	16	51	65	−14	29 (Note: 2 points deducted)	
13	Albion Rovers (R)	39	8	11	20	50	78	−28	27	Relegation to the Second Division
14	Alloa Athletic (R)	39	6	13	20	41	70	−29	25	Relegation to the Second Division

Source: RSSSF and statto
Rules for classification: 1) points; 2) goal difference; 3) number of goals scored.
(C) Champions; (P) Promoted; (R) Relegated
