= 1989–90 Scottish Second Division =

Scottish Second Division
- Season: 1989–90
- Champions: Brechin City
- Promoted: Brechin City; Kilmarnock

The 1989–90 Scottish Second Division was won by Brechin City who, along with second placed Kilmarnock, were promoted to the First Division. East Stirlingshire finished bottom.

== Table ==
Pos	Team	Pld	W	D	L	GF	GA	GD	Pts	Promotion
1	Brechin City (C, P)	39	19	11	9	59	44	+15	49	Promotion to the First Division
2	Kilmarnock (P)	39	21	5	13	67	41	+26	47	Promotion to the First Division
3	Stirling Albion	39	20	7	12	73	50	+23	47	
4	Stenhousemuir	39	18	9	12	62	53	+9	45	
5	Berwick Rangers	39	18	5	16	66	57	+9	41	
6	Dumbarton	39	15	10	14	70	73	−3	40	
7	Cowdenbeath	39	13	13	13	58	54	+4	39	
8	Stranraer	39	15	8	16	57	59	−2	38	
9	East Fife	39	12	12	15	60	63	−3	36	
10	Queen of the South	39	11	14	14	58	69	−11	36	
11	Queen's Park	39	13	10	16	40	51	−11	36	
12	Arbroath	39	12	10	17	47	61	−14	34	
13	Montrose	39	10	12	17	53	63	−10	32	
14	East Stirlingshire	39	8	10	21	34	66	−32	26	

Source: "1989-1990 Second Division - SPFL Archive". SPFL.
Rules for classification: 1) points; 2) goal difference; 3) number of goals scored.
(C) Champions; (P) Promoted
