= Alan Kay (footballer) =

Scottish footballer

Personal information
- Date of birth: 2 August 1961 (age 65)
- Place of birth: Glasgow, Scotland
- Positions: Full back; wing half

Youth career
- Scotland BC

Senior career*
Years	Team	Apps	(Gls)
1978–1984	Partick Thistle	56	(3)
1984–1988	Dumbarton	98	(4)
- * Club domestic league appearances and goals

Alan Kay (born 2 August 1961) is a Scottish former footballer who played for Partick Thistle and Dumbarton.
