= David Martin (footballer, born 1964) =

Scottish footballer

Dave Martin
Personal information
- Full name: David Martin
- Date of birth: 25 January 1964 (age 62)
- Place of birth: Bonnybridge
- Position: Midfielder

Senior career*
Years	Team	Apps	(Gls)
1982–1987	Alloa Athletic	81	(2)
1986–1989	Dumbarton	82	(2)
1988–1989	Queen of the South	3	(0)
1988–1990	St Johnstone	3	(0)
- * Club domestic league appearances and goals

David Martin (born 25 January 1964) is a Scottish retired footballer who played for Alloa Athletic, Dumbarton, Queen of the South and St Johnstone.
