= Boyd Strachan =

Scottish footballer

Personal information
- Full name: Hugh Boyd Strachan
- Date of birth: 16 November 1962 (age 63)
- Place of birth: Irvine, Scotland
- Position: Goalkeeper

Youth career
- Lugar Boswell Thistle

Senior career*
Years	Team	Apps	(Gls)
1980-1981	Troon		(0)
1981–1987	Stranraer	135	(0)
1988–1991	Dumbarton	56	(0)
1991-1997	Kilbirnie Ladeside		(0)
- * Club domestic league appearances and goals

Hugh Boyd Strachan (born 16 November 1962) was a Scottish footballer who played for Stranraer and Dumbarton.
