= Paul Quinn (footballer, born 1961) =

Scottish footballer

Personal information
- Full name: Paul Quinn
- Date of birth: 19 December 1961 (age 64)
- Place of birth: Glasgow, Scotland
- Position: Midfielder

Youth career
- Kirkintilloch Rob Roy

Senior career*
Years	Team	Apps	(Gls)
1978–1981	Middlesbrough	3	(0)
1981–1984	Stenhousemuir	79	(19)
1984–1985	Queen of the South	25	(2)
1985–1986	Cowdenbeath	23	(5)
1986	Stranraer	12	(2)
1986–1988	Stenhousemuir	37	(7)
1988–1989	Clyde	8	(1)
1989–1991	Dumbarton	53	(6)
Total		240	(42)
- * Club domestic league appearances and goals

Paul Quinn (born 19 December 1961) is a Scottish footballer who played for Stenhousemuir, Queen of the South, Cowdenbeath, Stranraer, Clyde and Dumbarton.
