= Jim Rooney (Scottish footballer) =

Scottish footballer

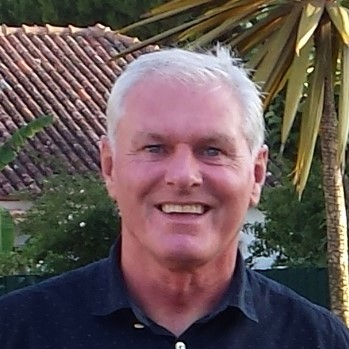

Personal information
- Full name: James Rooney
- Date of birth: 1 January 1956 (age 70)
- Place of birth: Glasgow, Scotland
- Position: Midfielder

Youth career
- Queens Park

Senior career*
Years	Team	Apps	(Gls)
1974–1978	Queen's Park	118	(12)
1977–1984	Morton	187	(26)
1984–1987	St Mirren	60	(8)
1986–1988	Dumbarton	66	(6)
1988–1990	Clyde	45	(2)
1990–1992	East Stirling	53	(1)
- * Club domestic league appearances and goals

Jim Rooney (born 1 January 1956) was a Scottish footballer who played for Queen's Park, Morton, St. Mirren, Dumbarton, Clyde and East Stirling. Jim born in the East end of Glasgow, played over 500 Scottish league games, captained Scotland B national team in the four nations tournament in Italy 1984, managed by the late Jock Stein. He is now retired and living on the west coast of Portugal with his family.
