= Hugh Stevenson (footballer) =

Scottish footballer

Personal information
- Full name: Hugh James Stevenson
- Date of birth: 21 June 1964 (age 62)
- Place of birth: Bridge of Allan, Scotland
- Position: Goalkeeper

Youth career
- Linlithgow Rose

Senior career*
Years	Team	Apps	(Gls)
1985–1988	Dumbarton	18	(0)
1987–1988	Partick Thistle	1	(0)
1988–1991	Dumbarton	60	(0)
1989–1990	Clydebank (loan)	1	(0)
1991–1993	Clyde	22	(0)
- * Club domestic league appearances and goals

Hugh James Stevenson (born 21 June 1964) was a Scottish footballer who played for Dumbarton, Partick Thistle, Clydebank and Clyde.
