= Stuart MacIver =

Scottish footballer

Personal information
- Full name: Stuart MacIver
- Date of birth: 12 November 1966 (age 59)
- Place of birth: Glasgow, Scotland
- Position: Centre forward

Youth career
- Duntocher BC

Senior career*
Years	Team	Apps	(Gls)
1984–1992	Dumbarton	172	(69)
1991–1993	Clyde		
- * Club domestic league appearances and goals

Stuart MacIver (born 12 November 1966) was a Scottish footballer who played for Dumbarton and Clyde.
