= 1980–81 Dundee F.C. season =

Dundee
1980–81 season
- Manager: Don Mackay
- First Division: 2nd (Promoted)
- Scottish Cup: 3rd round
- League Cup: Finalists
- Top goalscorer: League: Eric Sinclair (19); All: Eric Sinclair (22)
Home colours

The 1980–81 season was the 79th season in which Dundee competed at a Scottish national level, playing in the First Division after being relegated the previous season. Dundee would finish in 2nd place, achieving immediate promotion back to the top tier. Dundee would also compete in both the Scottish League Cup and the Scottish Cup, where they would be eliminated by Falkirk in the 3rd round of the Scottish Cup, and made an impressive run to the final of the League Cup, before being defeated by inter-city rivals Dundee United.

Dundee would switch from Admiral to Umbro as their kit manufacturer, and would return to white shorts along with the famous diamond stripes.

== Scottish First Division ==
Statistics provided by Dee Archive.

Match day	Date	Opponent	H/A	Score	Dundee scorer(s)	Attendance
1	9 August	Dunfermline Athletic	A	0–1		3,660
2	16 August	Ayr United	H	0–0		5,328
3	23 August	St Johnstone	A	0–1		4,197
4	6 September	Clydebank	A	0–3		1,296
5	9 September	Hibernian	H	1–2	Scrimgeour	5,304
6	13 September	Berwick Rangers	H	2–2	Fraser, Shirra (pen.)	3,782
7	17 September	Motherwell	A	2–3	Fraser, McGeachie	2,300
8	20 September	Falkirk	H	4–0	Fletcher, Mackie, Sinclair (2)	3,993
9	27 September	Stirling Albion	A	1–1	Shirra (pen.)	1,557
10	4 October	Dumbarton	H	3–1	Sinclair, Fleming, Shirra	3,553
11	11 October	Raith Rovers	A	0–0		3,255
12	14 October	Hamilton Academical	H	2–0	Fraser, Sinclair	3,170
13	18 October	East Stirlingshire	H	2–0	Murphy, Sinclair	3,771
14	25 October	Berwick Rangers	A	1–0	Sinclair	1,080
15	1 November	Clydebank	H	2–1	Fraser, Stephen	4,700
16	8 November	Motherwell	H	2–1	Ferguson (pen.), Shirra (pen.)	5,112
17	15 November	Falkirk	A	3–0	McGeachie, Sinclair (2)	3,500
18	22 November	Stirling Albion	H	5–1	Stephen (2), Sinclair, Mackie	4,815
19	29 November	Dumbarton	A	2–1	Stephen (2)	958
20	13 December	East Stirlingshire	A	2–0	Geddes, Murphy	1,026
21	20 December	Hibernian	H	1–0	Sinclair	7,454
22	27 December	Ayr United	A	0–1		4,026
23	1 January	St Johnstone	H	2–2	Stephen, Sinclair	8,573
24	3 January	Hamilton Academical	A	2–4	Stephen, Geddes	2,381
25	31 January	Ayr United	H	2–4	Scrimgeour, Sinclair	4,724
26	7 February	Hibernian	A	0–0		4,989
27	21 February	Motherwell	A	1–4	Williamson	2,072
28	11 March	Dumbarton	H	2–1	Scrimgeour, Sinclair	2,812
29	14 March	Raith Rovers	H	3–1	Geddes (2), Scrimgeour	6,315
30	18 March	Dunfermline Athletic	H	2–0	Geddes	3,159
31	21 March	Hamilton Academical	A	3–1	Sinclair (2), Murphy	1,492
32	24 March	Stirling Albion	A	1–0	Murphy	752
33	28 March	Berwick Rangers	H	0–0		3,509
34	1 April	Raith Rovers	H	2–1	Sinclair, Fraser	6,178
35	4 April	St Johnstone	H	4–1	Sinclair (2), Scrimgeour, Mackie	8,586
36	11 April	Dunfermline Athletic	A	1–1	Mackie	3,000
37	18 April	Clydebank	H	1–0	Geddes	4,771
38	25 April	Falkirk	A	2–1	Murphy, Stephen	4,500
39	2 May	East Stirlingshire	A	1–0	Sinclair	5,762

=== League table ===
Pos	Team	Pld	W	D	L	GF	GA	GD	Pts	Promotion or relegation
1	Hibernian (C, P)	39	24	9	6	67	24	+43	57	Promotion to the Premier Division
2	Dundee (P)	39	22	8	9	64	40	+24	52	Promotion to the Premier Division
3	St Johnstone	39	21	10	8	64	44	+20	52	
4	Raith Rovers	39	20	10	9	49	32	+17	50	
5	Motherwell	39	19	11	9	65	51	+14	49	

Source: RSSSF
Rules for classification: 1) points; 2) goal difference; 3) number of goals scored.
(C) Champions; (P) Promoted

== Scottish League Cup ==
Statistics provided by Dee Archive.

Match day	Date	Opponent	H/A	Score	Dundee scorer(s)	Attendance
1st round, 1st leg	26 August	Arbroath	H	2–0	Fletcher (2)	3,745
1st round, 2nd leg	30 August	Arbroath	A	3–0	MacLaren, Sinclair, Fletcher	2,855
Dundee win 5–0 on aggregate
2nd round, 1st leg	3 September	Kilmarnock	H	0–0		4,388
2nd round, 2nd leg	24 September	Kilmarnock	A	0–0		2,401
Tied 0–0 on aggregate, Dundee win 5–4 on penalties
Quarter-finals, 1st leg	8 October	Aberdeen	H	0–0		10,308
Quarter-finals, 2nd leg	29 October	Aberdeen	A	1–0	Fraser	14,925
Dundee win 1–0 on aggregate
Semi-finals, 1st leg	5 November	Ayr United	A	1–1	Sinclair	6,801
Semi-finals, 2nd leg	19 November	Ayr United	H	3–2	Williamson, Fraser, Sinclair	9,438
Dundee win 4–3 on aggregate
Final	6 December	Dundee United	H/N	0–3		24,446

== Scottish Cup ==
Statistics provided by Dee Archive.

Match day	Date	Opponent	H/A	Score	Dundee scorer(s)	Attendance
3rd round	24 January	Falkirk	A	0–1		4,486

== Player statistics ==
Statistics provided by Dee Archive

No.	Pos	Nat	Player	Total		First Division		Scottish Cup		League Cup	
No.	Pos	Nat	Player	Apps	Goals	Apps	Goals	Apps	Goals	Apps	Goals
	DF	(Scotland) SCO	Les Barr	38	0	30	0	0	0	5+3	0
	GK	(Scotland) SCO	Alan Blair	15	0	15	0	0	0	0	0
	FW	(Scotland) SCO	Dennis Corrigan	3	0	1+2	0	0	0	0	0
	FW	(Scotland) SCO	Gerry Davidson	1	0	0+1	0	0	0	0	0
	FW	(Scotland) SCO	Iain Ferguson	13	1	8+4	1	1	0	0	0
	FW	(Scotland) SCO	Ian Fleming	12	1	7+1	1	0	0	4	0
	FW	(Scotland) SCO	John Fletcher	12	4	6+1	1	0	0	4+1	3
	MF	(Scotland) SCO	Cammy Fraser	38	7	31	5	1	0	6	2
	FW	(Scotland) SCO	Andy Geddes	20	7	18	7	1	0	1	0
	GK	(Scotland) SCO	Bobby Geddes	30	0	21	0	0	0	9	0
	DF	(Scotland) SCO	Bobby Glennie	50	0	40	0	1	0	9	0
	DF	(Scotland) SCO	Stewart MacLaren	41	1	32	0	1	0	8	1
	MF	(Scotland) SCO	Peter Mackie	45	5	26+9	5	1	0	7+2	0
	DF	(Scotland) SCO	George McGeachie	39	2	27+3	2	1	0	8	0
	FW	(Scotland) SCO	Stewart McKimmie	18	0	16+2	0	0	0	0	0
	MF	(Scotland) SCO	Jim Murphy	43	5	20+15	5	0	0	4+4	0
	DF	(Scotland) SCO	Erich Schaedler	43	0	32+1	0	1	0	9	0
	FW	(Scotland) SCO	Jocky Scott	5	0	2	0	0	0	3	0
	DF	(Scotland) SCO	Brian Scrimgeour	24	5	18+4	5	0	0	1+1	0
	MF	(Scotland) SCO	Jim Shirra	29	4	15+5	4	0	0	6+3	0
	FW	(Scotland) SCO	Eric Sinclair	47	22	37	19	1	0	9	3
	FW	(Scotland) SCO	Ray Stephen	27	8	19+4	8	1	0	2+1	0
	GK	(Scotland) SCO	Evan Williams	5	0	4	0	1	0	0	0
	FW	(Scotland) SCO	Billy Williamson	26	2	15+5	1	0+1	0	4+1	1

== See also ==
- List of Dundee F.C. seasons
