= 1981–82 Dundee F.C. season =

Dundee
1981–82 season
- Manager: Don Mackay
- Premier Division: 8th
- Scottish Cup: Quarter-finals
- League Cup: Group stage
- Top goalscorer: League: Iain Ferguson (13); All: Iain Ferguson (14)
Home colours

The 1981–82 season was the 80th season in which Dundee competed at a Scottish national level, playing in the Scottish Premier Division after being promoted the previous season. Dundee would finish in 8th place, remaining safe by 4 points. Dundee would also compete in both the Scottish League Cup and the Scottish Cup, where they would be knocked out in the group stage of the League Cup, and eliminated by Rangers in the quarter-finals of the Scottish Cup.

== Scottish Premier Division ==
Statistics provided by Dee Archive.

Match day	Date	Opponent	H/A	Score	Dundee scorer(s)	Attendance
1	29 August	Hibernian	H	0–2		5,738
2	5 September	Partick Thistle	H	4–2	Fraser, Ferguson, MacDonald, MacKinnon (o.g.)	4,653
3	12 September	Dundee United	A	2–5	Ferguson (pen.), Mackie	15,696
4	19 September	St Mirren	H	3–0	Ferguson (2) (pen.), Sinclair	5,257
5	26 September	Greenock Morton	A	0–2		2,763
6	3 October	Celtic	H	1–3	McGeachie	13,254
7	10 October	Airdrieonians	A	2–4	Ferguson (2) (pen.)	2,500
8	17 October	Rangers	H	2–3	Cameron, Ferguson	11,956
9	24 October	Aberdeen	A	1–2	Stephen	11,893
10	31 October	Hibernian	H	0–0		6,011
11	7 November	Partick Thistle	A	2–1	Mackie (2)	3,337
12	14 November	Dundee United	H	1–3	Ferguson	15,578
13	21 November	St Mirren	A	0–4		3,600
14	28 November	Greenock Morton	H	4–1	Ferguson, Bell, Sinclair, Mackie	3,598
15	5 December	Celtic	A	1–3	Sinclair	14,570
16	12 December	Airdrieonians	H	3–1	MacDonald, Sinclair, Fraser	3,988
17	19 December	Rangers	A	1–2	McGeachie	11,000
18	2 January	Hibernian	A	1–2	Sinclair	8,281
19	30 January	St Mirren	H	0–2		4,628
20	6 February	Celtic	H	1–3	Kidd	11,377
21	20 February	Greenock Morton	A	0–2		2,000
22	27 February	Aberdeen	A	0–0		8,961
23	10 March	Dundee United	A	1–1	Ferguson	13,790
24	13 March	Airdrieonians	A	2–0	Fleming, Fraser	2,000
25	17 March	Aberdeen	H	0–3		6,126
26	20 March	Hibernian	H	2–2	Fraser, Stephen	4,345
27	27 March	Partick Thistle	A	2–0	Sinclair, Fraser	2,500
28	3 April	Dundee United	H	0–2		12,602
29	10 April	St Mirren	A	1–0	Kidd	3,804
30	14 April	Rangers	H	3–1	Stephen (2), Ferguson	7,975
31	17 April	Celtic	A	2–4	Smith, Ferguson	14,288
32	21 April	Partick Thistle	A	1–2	Sinclair	6,463
33	25 April	Greenock Morton	H	2–1	McGeachie, Fraser	5,346
34	1 May	Aberdeen	H	0–5		6,415
35	8 May	Rangers	A	0–4		8,500
36	15 May	Airdrieonians	H	1–0	Ferguson	6,696

=== League table ===
Pos	Team	Pld	W	D	L	GF	GA	GD	Pts	Qualification or relegation
6	Hibernian	36	11	14	11	38	40	−2	36	
7	Morton	36	9	12	15	31	54	−23	30	
8	Dundee	36	11	4	21	46	72	−26	26	
9	Partick Thistle (R)	36	6	10	20	35	59	−24	22	Relegation to the 1982–83 Scottish First Division
10	Airdrieonians (R)	36	5	8	23	31	76	−45	18	Relegation to the 1982–83 Scottish First Division

Source: Statto
Rules for classification: 1) points; 2) goal difference; 3) number of goals scored.
(R) Relegated

== Scottish League Cup ==
Statistics provided by Dee Archive.

=== Group 2 ===
Match day	Date	Opponent	H/A	Score	Dundee scorer(s)	Attendance
1	8 August	Raith Rovers	H	1–2	Fleming	5,362
2	12 August	Rangers	A	1–4	Fleming	13,309
3	15 August	Greenock Morton	H	1–2	Fleming	4,710
4	19 August	Rangers	H	1–2	MacDonald	9,124
5	22 August	Raith Rovers	A	1–1	Stephen	1,844
6	26 August	Greenock Morton	A	2–3	Cameron, Fleming	1,675

==== Group 2 table ====
Team	Pld	W	D	L	GF	GA	GD	Pts
Rangers	6	5	1	0	19	5	+14	11
Morton	6	4	1	1	13	7	+6	9
Raith Rovers	6	1	1	4	7	20	−13	3
Dundee	6	0	1	5	7	14	−7	1

== Scottish Cup ==
Statistics provided by Dee Archive.

Match day	Date	Opponent	H/A	Score	Dundee scorer(s)	Attendance
3rd round	23 January	Raith Rovers	H	1–0	Stephen	5,474
4th round	14 February	Meadowbank Thistle	H	3–0	Smith, Ferguson, Mackie	4,453
Quarter-finals	6 March	Rangers	A	0–2		16,072

== Player statistics ==
Statistics provided by Dee Archive

No.	Pos	Nat	Player	Total		First Division		Scottish Cup		League Cup	
No.	Pos	Nat	Player	Apps	Goals	Apps	Goals	Apps	Goals	Apps	Goals
	DF	(Scotland) SCO	Les Barr	26	0	23+1	0	0	0	2	0
	FW	(Scotland) SCO	Davie Bell	21	1	15+1	1	1	0	4	0
	GK	(Scotland) SCO	Alan Blair	11	0	8	0	1	0	2	0
	DF	(Scotland) SCO	Danny Cameron	32	2	25+3	1	2+1	0	1	1
	FW	(Scotland) SCO	Gerry Davidson	4	0	1+3	0	0	0	0	0
	FW	(Scotland) SCO	Iain Ferguson	39	14	34	13	3	1	1+1	0
	FW	(Scotland) SCO	Ian Fleming	24	5	13+3	1	2	0	6	4
	MF	(Scotland) SCO	Cammy Fraser	37	6	31	6	2	0	4	0
	GK	(Scotland) SCO	Bobby Geddes	34	0	28	0	2	0	4	0
	DF	(Scotland) SCO	Bobby Glennie	44	0	35	0	3	0	6	0
	FW	(Scotland) SCO	Albert Kidd	39	2	21+9	2	2+1	0	6	0
	DF	(Scotland) SCO	Ian MacDonald	23	3	17	2	0	0	6	1
	MF	(Scotland) SCO	Peter Mackie	38	5	22+10	4	2+1	1	1+2	0
	DF	(Scotland) SCO	George McGeachie	37	3	28+1	3	3	0	4+1	0
	FW	(Scotland) SCO	Stewart McKimmie	22	0	16	0	2	0	4	0
	DF	(Scotland) SCO	Chic McLelland	19	0	15	0	3	0	1	0
	MF	(Scotland) SCO	Jim Murphy	11	0	7	0	1	0	3	0
	DF	(Scotland) SCO	Erich Schaedler	2	0	1	0	0	0	1	0
	DF	(Scotland) SCO	Brian Scrimgeour	17	0	6+6	0	1	0	2+2	0
	FW	(Scotland) SCO	Eric Sinclair	31	7	24+1	7	1	0	5	0
	MF	(Scotland) SCO	Jim Smith	19	2	17	1	2	1	0	0
	FW	(Scotland) SCO	Ray Stephen	31	6	9+15	4	0+2	1	3+2	1

== See also ==
- List of Dundee F.C. seasons
