= 1982–83 Dundee F.C. season =

Dundee
1982–83 season
- Manager: Don Mackay
- Premier Division: 6th
- Scottish Cup: 4th round
- League Cup: Group stage
- Top goalscorer: League: Iain Ferguson (9); All: Iain Ferguson (16)
Home colours

The 1982–83 season was the 81st season in which Dundee competed at a Scottish national level, playing in the Scottish Premier Division. Dundee would finish in 6th place. Dundee would also compete in both the Scottish League Cup and the Scottish Cup, where they would be knocked out in the group stage of the League Cup, and eliminated by Aberdeen in the 4th round of the Scottish Cup.

== Scottish Premier Division ==
Statistics provided by Dee Archive.

Match day	Date	Opponent	H/A	Score	Dundee scorer(s)	Attendance
1	4 September	Celtic	A	0–2		19,122
2	11 September	Motherwell	H	3–1	Ferguson (2) (2x pen.), Stephen	4,621
3	18 September	Greenock Morton	H	2–0	Sinclair (2)	3,977
4	25 September	Kilmarnock	A	0–0		2,105
5	2 October	Rangers	A	1–1	Fraser	16,797
6	9 October	Hibernian	H	2–1	Smith, Ferguson	5,287
7	16 October	Aberdeen	A	0–1		10,863
8	23 October	St Mirren	H	1–1	Stephen	4,831
9	30 October	Dundee United	A	0–1		14,959
10	6 November	Celtic	H	2–3	Fraser (2)	11,681
11	13 November	Motherwell	A	0–1		3,295
12	20 November	Greenock Morton	A	2–1	Bell, Mackie	1,984
13	27 November	Kilmarnock	H	5–2	Fraser, Murphy (2), Bell, Mackie	4,311
14	11 December	Hibernian	A	1–1	Mackie	5,352
15	18 December	Aberdeen	H	0–2		6,528
16	27 December	St Mirren	A	0–0		4,412
17	1 January	Dundee United	H	0–2		18,109
18	3 January	Celtic	A	2–2	Sinclair (2)	16,615
19	8 January	Motherwell	H	3–1	Ferguson, Mackie, Stephen	5,131
20	15 January	Greenock Morton	H	3–3	Ferguson, Sinclair, Stephen	4,557
21	22 January	Kilmarnock	A	0–2		1,900
22	5 February	Rangers	A	1–1	Bell	7,096
23	22 February	Hibernian	H	0–1		4,363
24	26 February	Aberdeen	A	1–3	Stephen	11,314
25	2 March	Rangers	H	1–0	Kidd	6,624
26	5 March	St Mirren	H	2–5	Scrimgeour, Kidd	4,161
27	12 March	Dundee United	A	3–5	Fraser, Ferguson (pen.), Kidd	13,448
28	19 March	Celtic	H	2–1	Scrimgeour, Kidd	11,196
29	26 March	Motherwell	A	1–1	Ferguson	3,222
30	2 April	Greenock Morton	A	0–1		3,000
31	9 April	Kilmarnock	A	0–0		3,376
32	23 April	Hibernian	A	0–0		3,571
33	30 April	Aberdeen	H	0–2		10,076
34	4 May	Rangers	H	2–1	Ferguson, Sinclair	4,778
35	9 May	St Mirren	A	1–2	Mackie	6,000
36	14 May	Dundee United	H	1–2	Ferguson	29,106

=== League table ===
Pos	Team	Pld	W	D	L	GF	GA	GD	Pts	Qualification or relegation
4	Rangers	36	13	12	11	53	41	+12	38	Qualification for the Cup Winners' Cup first round
5	St Mirren	36	11	12	13	47	51	−4	34	Qualification for the UEFA Cup first round
6	Dundee	36	9	11	16	42	53	−11	29	
7	Hibernian	36	7	15	14	35	51	−16	29	
8	Motherwell	36	11	5	20	39	73	−34	27	

Source: Statto
Rules for classification: 1) points; 2) goal difference; 3) number of goals scored.

== Scottish League Cup ==
Statistics provided by Dee Archive.

=== Group 2 ===
Match day	Date	Opponent	H/A	Score	Dundee scorer(s)	Attendance
1	14 August	Aberdeen	A	3–3	Ferguson (2), Stephen	9,002
2	18 August	Dumbarton	H	3–2	Ferguson (2), Mackie	3,174
3	21 August	Greenock Morton	A	1–4	Davidson	1,992
4	25 August	Dumbarton	A	3–2	Sinclair, Stephen, Ferguson	433
5	28 August	Aberdeen	H	1–5	Stephen	6,977
6	1 September	Greenock Morton	H	3–3	Ferguson, Kidd, Mackie	1,888

==== Group 2 table ====
Team	Pld	W	D	L	GF	GA	GD	Pts
Aberdeen	6	4	2	0	18	7	+11	10
Morton	6	3	2	1	16	11	+5	8
Dundee	6	2	2	2	14	19	−5	6
Dumbarton	6	0	0	6	7	18	−11	0

== Scottish Cup ==
Statistics provided by Dee Archive.

Match day	Date	Opponent	H/A	Score	Dundee scorer(s)	Attendance
3rd round	29 January	Brora Rangers	H	2–1	Ferguson, Sinclair	5,823
4th round	5 February	Aberdeen	A	0–1		19,070

== Player statistics ==
Statistics provided by Dee Archive

No.	Pos	Nat	Player	Total		First Division		Scottish Cup		League Cup	
No.	Pos	Nat	Player	Apps	Goals	Apps	Goals	Apps	Goals	Apps	Goals
	FW	(Scotland) SCO	Davie Bell	30	3	21+7	3	2	0	0	0
	GK	(Scotland) SCO	Alan Blair	3	0	0	0	0	0	3	0
	FW	(Scotland) SCO	Gerry Davidson	12	1	6+1	0	0	0	1+4	1
	FW	(Scotland) SCO	Iain Ferguson	37	16	25+4	9	2	1	6	6
	FW	(Scotland) SCO	Ian Fleming	12	0	8	0	0	0	0+4	0
	MF	(Scotland) SCO	Cammy Fraser	42	5	34	5	2	0	6	0
	FW	(Scotland) SCO	Andy Geddes	2	0	0	0	0	0	2	0
	GK	(Scotland) SCO	Bobby Geddes	3	0	1	0	0	0	2	0
	DF	(Scotland) SCO	Bobby Glennie	33	0	23+2	0	1+1	0	6	0
	GK	(England) ENG	Colin Kelly	38	0	35	0	2	0	1	0
	FW	(Scotland) SCO	Albert Kidd	21	5	15+4	4	0	0	1+1	1
	DF	(Scotland) SCO	Ian MacDonald	37	0	34	0	1	0	2	0
	MF	(Scotland) SCO	Peter Mackie	44	7	32+4	5	2	0	6	2
	DF	(Scotland) SCO	George McGeachie	31	0	20+3	0	2	0	6	0
	FW	(Scotland) SCO	Colin McGlashan	2	0	0+2	0	0	0	0	0
	DF	(Scotland) SCO	Stewart McKimmie	39	0	28+3	0	2	0	6	0
	DF	(Scotland) SCO	Tosh McKinlay	1	0	1	0	0	0	0	0
	DF	(Scotland) SCO	Chic McLelland	6	0	0+1	0	0	0	5	0
	MF	(Scotland) SCO	Jim Murphy	12	2	6+5	2	0+1	0	0	0
	DF	(Scotland) SCO	Brian Scrimgeour	24	2	19+4	2	0	0	1	0
	FW	(Scotland) SCO	Eric Sinclair	39	8	25+6	6	2	1	5+1	1
	MF	(Scotland) SCO	Jim Smith	39	1	36	1	2	0	1	0
	FW	(Scotland) SCO	Ray Stephen	38	8	27+3	5	2	0	6	3

== See also ==
- List of Dundee F.C. seasons
