= 1983–84 Dundee F.C. season =

Dundee
1983–84 season
- Manager: Don Mackay (until Dec. 1983); Archie Knox (from Dec. 1983)
- Premier Division: 8th
- Scottish Cup: Semi-finals
- League Cup: Group stage
- Top goalscorer: League: Walker McCall (13); All: Iain Ferguson (20)
Home colours

The 1983–84 season was the 82nd season in which Dundee competed at a Scottish national level, playing in the Scottish Premier Division. Dundee would finish in 8th place. Dundee would also compete in both the Scottish League Cup and the Scottish Cup, where they would be knocked out in the group stage of the League Cup, and would make it to the semi-finals of the Scottish Cup before being defeated by Aberdeen.

== Scottish Premier Division ==
Statistics provided by Dee Archive.

Match day	Date	Opponent	H/A	Score	Dundee scorer(s)	Attendance
1	20 August	Aberdeen	A	0–3		14,304
2	3 September	Dundee United	H	1–4	McCall	13,656
3	10 September	St Mirren	A	0–0		2,808
4	17 September	Heart of Midlothian	H	1–2	Ferguson (pen.)	6,765
5	24 September	Celtic	H	2–6	Ferguson (2) (2x pen.)	11,467
6	1 October	Motherwell	A	3–1	McCall, MacLeod (o.g.), Carson (o.g.)	2,931
7	8 October	St Johnstone	A	2–0	McCall, Geddes	3,709
8	15 October	Rangers	H	3–2	Ferguson (2), McCall	11,945
9	22 October	Hibernian	A	1–2	Mackie	6,838
10	29 October	Aberdeen	H	1–3	Glennie	7,849
11	5 November	Dundee United	A	1–0	Mackie	14,813
12	13 November	Heart of Midlothian	A	3–1	McKinlay, McCall (2)	12,271
13	19 November	Motherwell	H	2–0	Fraser, Stephen	4,638
14	26 November	Celtic	A	0–1		14,583
15	3 December	St Mirren	H	2–2	McCall, Stephen	4,572
16	10 December	Hibernian	H	0–3		4,628
17	17 December	Rangers	A	1–2	Geddes	16,500
18	27 December	St Johnstone	H	0–1		6,650
19	31 December	Aberdeen	A	2–5	Mackie, Ferguson	18,250
20	7 January	Heart of Midlothian	H	4–1	Glennie, McCall, Ferguson, Fraser	5,960
21	11 February	St Mirren	A	0–4		3,187
22	25 February	Rangers	H	1–3	Harris	11,750
23	29 February	Hibernian	A	1–3	McCall	2,601
24	3 March	St Johnstone	A	0–1		2,824
25	20 March	Celtic	H	3–2	McCall (2), Stephen	7,746
26	28 March	Motherwell	A	4–2	Kidd, MacDonald, McKinlay, Ferguson	1,828
27	31 March	Hibernian	H	1–2	McInally	4,355
28	2 April	Dundee United	H	2–5	Ferguson (2) (2x pen.)	12,732
29	7 April	St Mirren	H	2–5	Harris, Fraser	3,582
30	18 April	Motherwell	H	1–0	McGlashan	4,190
31	21 April	Dundee United	A	1–1	McCall	13,244
32	24 April	Celtic	A	0–3		4,596
33	28 April	Aberdeen	H	0–1		6,663
34	5 May	Rangers	A	2–2	McKinlay, McCall	17,000
35	9 May	Heart of Midlothian	A	1–1	McInally	6,571
36	12 May	St Johnstone	H	2–0	Ferguson (2)	4,879

=== League table ===
Pos	Team	Pld	W	D	L	GF	GA	GD	Pts	Qualification or relegation
6	St Mirren	36	9	14	13	55	59	−4	32	
7	Hibernian	36	12	7	17	45	55	−10	31	
8	Dundee	36	11	5	20	50	74	−24	27	
9	St Johnstone (R)	36	10	3	23	36	81	−45	23	Relegation to the 1984–85 Scottish First Division
10	Motherwell (R)	36	4	7	25	31	75	−44	15	Relegation to the 1984–85 Scottish First Division

Source: Statto
Rules for classification: 1) points; 2) goal difference; 3) number of goals scored.
(R) Relegated

== Scottish League Cup ==
Statistics provided by Dee Archive.

=== Knockout stage ===
Match day	Date	Opponent	H/A	Score	Dundee scorer(s)	Attendance
2nd round, 1st leg	23 August	Montrose	A	3–1	Kidd, Ferguson, MacDonald	844
2nd round, 2nd leg	27 August	Montrose	H	4–1	MacDonald (2), McCall, Ferguson (pen.)	2,516
Dundee win 7–2 on aggregate

=== Group 3 ===
Match day	Date	Opponent	H/A	Score	Dundee scorer(s)	Attendance
1	31 August	St Johnstone	H	2–1	McCall, Mackie	4,534
2	7 September	Meadowbank Thistle	A	1–0	McCall	592
3	5 October	Aberdeen	A	0–0		13,200
4	25 October	Meadowbank Thistle	H	1–1	Fraser	1,853
5	9 November	St Johnstone	A	3–0	Ferguson (2), McCall	2,458
6	30 November	Aberdeen	H	1–2	Fraser	11,019

==== Group 3 table ====
Team	Pld	W	D	L	GF	GA	GD	Pts
Aberdeen	6	5	1	0	11	2	+9	11
Dundee	6	3	2	1	8	4	+4	8
Meadowbank Thistle	6	1	2	3	4	10	−6	4
St Johnstone	6	0	1	5	2	9	−7	1

== Scottish Cup ==
Statistics provided by Dee Archive.

Match day	Date	Opponent	H/A	Score	Dundee scorer(s)	Attendance
3rd round	8 February	Cowdenbeath	A	2–0	McCall (2)	1,500
4th round	19 February	Airdrieonians	H	2–1	Stephen, Ferguson	5,107
Quarter-finals	10 March	Rangers	H	2–2	Ferguson, Kidd	17,097
QF replay	17 March	Rangers	A	3–2	Smith, Ferguson (2)	25,000
Semi-finals	14 April	Aberdeen	N	0–2		17,654

== Player statistics ==
Statistics provided by Dee Archive

No.	Pos	Nat	Player	Total		First Division		Scottish Cup		League Cup	
No.	Pos	Nat	Player	Apps	Goals	Apps	Goals	Apps	Goals	Apps	Goals
	GK	(Scotland) SCO	Alan Blair	4	0	2	0	2	0	0	0
	FW	(Scotland) SCO	Iain Ferguson	45	20	33	12	4	4	8	4
	MF	(Scotland) SCO	Cammy Fraser	42	5	29	3	5	0	8	2
	FW	(Scotland) SCO	Andy Geddes	15	2	9+2	2	0+1	0	3	0
	GK	(Scotland) SCO	Bobby Geddes	29	0	24	0	1	0	4	0
	DF	(Scotland) SCO	Bobby Glennie	37	2	26+1	2	4	0	6	0
	FW	(Scotland) SCO	Colin Harris	17	2	9+5	2	3	0	0	0
	FW	(Scotland) SCO	Colin Hendry	4	0	1+2	0	0+1	0	0	0
	GK	(England) ENG	Colin Kelly	16	0	10	0	2	0	4	0
	FW	(Scotland) SCO	Albert Kidd	37	3	18+7	1	4+1	1	5+2	1
	DF	(Scotland) SCO	Ian MacDonald	28	4	17+3	1	3	0	5	3
	MF	(Scotland) SCO	Peter Mackie	39	4	18+10	3	4	0	7	1
	FW	(Scotland) SCO	Walker McCall	40	19	30+1	13	3	2	6	4
	DF	(Scotland) SCO	George McGeachie	33	0	22+1	0	4	0	6	0
	FW	(Scotland) SCO	Colin McGlashan	12	1	2+6	1	0+2	0	0+2	0
	MF	(Scotland) SCO	Jim McInally	11	2	11	2	0	0	0	0
	DF	(Scotland) SCO	Stewart McKimmie	24	0	16	0	0	0	8	0
	DF	(Scotland) SCO	Tosh McKinlay	47	3	36	3	4	0	5+2	0
	MF	(Scotland) SCO	Derek Paterson	2	0	0+2	0	0	0	0	0
	MF	(Scotland) SCO	Lex Richardson	33	0	28+1	0	4	0	0	0
	DF	(Scotland) SCO	Rab Shannon	7	0	5+1	0	0	0	1	0
	FW	(Scotland) SCO	Eric Sinclair	2	0	0+1	0	0	0	1	0
	MF	(Scotland) SCO	Jim Smith	43	1	32+2	0	5	1	4	0
	FW	(Scotland) SCO	Ray Stephen	33	4	18+2	3	3+2	1	7+1	0

== See also ==
- List of Dundee F.C. seasons
