= 1978–79 Dundee F.C. season =

Dundee
1978–79 season
- Manager: Tommy Gemmell
- First Division: 1st (champions)
- Scottish Cup: Quarter-finals
- League Cup: 1st round
- Top goalscorer: League: Billy Pirie & Ian Redford (16); All: Billy Pirie (18)
Home colours

The 1978–79 season was the 77th season in which Dundee competed at a Scottish national level, playing in the First Division for the third straight season. In another tight title race, Dundee would prevail and win both promotion back to the top tier and the First Division title. Dundee would also compete in both the Scottish League Cup and the Scottish Cup, where they would be eliminated by Celtic in the 1st round of the League Cup, and by Rangers in the quarter-finals of the Scottish Cup.

== Scottish First Division ==
Statistics provided by Dee Archive.

Match day	Date	Opponent	H/A	Score	Dundee scorer(s)	Attendance
1	12 August	Ayr United	A	1–0	Redford	3,875
2	19 August	Arbroath	H	2–0	Sinclair, Pirie	6,826
3	26 August	St Johnstone	A	2–0	Pirie (2)	3,875
4	6 September	Montrose	H	1–1	Phillip	4,708
5	9 September	Kilmarnock	A	1–1	Lamb	
6	13 September	Raith Rovers	A	4–2	Barr, McDougall, Redford (2)	4,488
7	16 September	Clyde	H	2–0	Redford, Williamson	6,899
8	23 September	Clydebank	H	2–0	Pirie (2)	7,272
9	27 September	Dumbarton	A	0–0		1,700
10	30 September	Hamilton Academical	A	2–1	Shirra, McGhee	3,000
11	7 October	Queen of the South	H	5–0	Redford, Williamson (2)	5,837
12	14 October	Stirling Albion	A	0–1		2,000
13	21 October	Airdrieonians	H	1–0	Shirra	5,600
14	28 October	Arbroath	A	1–0	Wells (o.g.)	3,852
15	4 November	St Johnstone	H	1–1	Caldwell	5,918
16	11 November	Kilmarnock	H	0–0		5,620
17	18 November	Clyde	A	1–2	Glennie	2,368
18	25 November	Clydebank	A	1–2	Sinclair	2,243
19	2 December	Hamilton Academical	H	1–1	Pirie	4,646
20	9 December	Queen of the South	A	1–3	Williamson	1,350
21	16 December	Stirling Albion	H	2–1	Pirie, Redford	4,641
22	23 December	Airdrieonians	A	2–0	Pirie, Murphy	
23	21 February	Clydebank	H	2–1	Redford (2)	5,901
24	14 March	Montrose	A	2–0	Redford, Lamb	1,800
25	24 March	Dumbarton	H	2–0	Shirra, Pirie (pen.)	5,547
26	28 March	Stirling Albion	A	1–0	Pirie	2,000
27	31 March	Ayr United	A	2–1	Sinclair, Pirie (pen.)	2,970
28	4 April	Queen of the South	H	4–0	Sinclair (2), Pirie (2) (pen.)	4,546
29	7 April	Dumbarton	A	2–3	Pirie, Redford	1,500
30	11 April	Raith Rovers	A	2–1	MacLaren, Redford	2,769
31	14 April	Hamilton Academical	H	4–3	Sinclair (2), MacLaren, Shirra	5,804
32	18 April	Clyde	H	2–0	MacLaren, Pirie	5,222
33	21 April	Airdrieonians	A	4–2	Sinclair, Shirra, Redford (2)	2,500
34	25 April	Kilmarnock	A	1–2	Murphy	5,000
35	28 April	Montrose	H	1–0	Pirie (pen.)	5,941
36	2 May	St Johnstone	A	2–3	Sinclair, Schaedler	5,840
37	6 May	Arbroath	H	0–2		8,385
38	8 May	Raith Rovers	H	2–0	Redford, MacLaren	6,450
39	10 May	Ayr United	H	2–2	Redford (2)	7,692

=== League table ===
Pos	Team	Pld	W	D	L	GF	GA	GD	Pts	Promotion or relegation
1	Dundee (C, P)	39	24	7	8	69	36	+33	55	Promotion to the Premier Division
2	Kilmarnock (P)	39	22	10	7	72	36	+36	54	Promotion to the Premier Division
3	Clydebank	39	24	6	9	78	50	+28	54	
4	Ayr United	39	21	5	13	73	54	+19	47	
5	Hamilton Academical	39	17	9	13	63	61	+2	43	

Source: RSSSF and statto
Rules for classification: 1) points; 2) goal difference; 3) number of goals scored.
(C) Champions; (P) Promoted

== Scottish League Cup ==
Statistics provided by Dee Archive.

Match day	Date	Opponent	H/A	Score	Dundee scorer(s)	Attendance
1st round, 1st leg	16 August	Celtic	A	1–3	Sinclair	10,515
1st round, 2nd leg	23 August	Celtic	H	0–3		12,698
Celtic win 6–1 on aggregate

== Scottish Cup ==
Statistics provided by Dee Archive.

Match day	Date	Opponent	H/A	Score	Dundee scorer(s)	Attendance
3rd round	25 February	Falkirk	H	1–0	Pirie (pen.)	9,671
4th round	3 March	St Mirren	H	4–1	Lamb, Sinclair (2), Pirie (pen.)	11,140
Quarter-finals	10 March	Rangers	A	3–6	MacLaren (2), Shirra	23,000

== Player statistics ==
Statistics provided by Dee Archive

No.	Pos	Nat	Player	Total		First Division		Scottish Cup		League Cup	
No.	Pos	Nat	Player	Apps	Goals	Apps	Goals	Apps	Goals	Apps	Goals
	DF	(Scotland) SCO	Les Barr	26	1	21	1	3	0	2	0
	FW	(Scotland) SCO	Chic Bradley	1	0	0+1	0	0	0	0	0
	MF	(Scotland) SCO	Norrie Brown	1	0	0+1	0	0	0	0	0
	DF	(Scotland) SCO	Alex Caldwell	16	1	14+2	1	0	0	0	0
	FW	(Scotland) SCO	Gerry Davidson	7	0	3+3	0	0+1	0	0	0
	GK	(Scotland) SCO	Ally Donaldson	44	0	39	0	3	0	2	0
	DF	(Scotland) SCO	Bobby Glennie	42	1	36+1	1	3	0	2	0
	MF	(Scotland) SCO	Alan Lamb	29	3	22+2	2	3	1	2	0
	DF	(Scotland) SCO	Dave MacKinnon	2	0	1	0	0	0	1	0
	DF	(Scotland) SCO	Stewart MacLaren	24	6	21	4	3	2	0	0
	DF	(Scotland) SCO	John MacPhail	4	0	2+1	0	0	0	1	0
	MF	(Scotland) SCO	Ian McDougall	18	0	8+9	0	0	0	1	0
	DF	(Scotland) SCO	George McGeachie	5	0	3+2	0	0	0	0	0
	FW	(Scotland) SCO	Alec McGhee	22	2	20	2	0	0	2	0
	DF	(Scotland) SCO	Peter Millar	16	0	16	0	0	0	0	0
	MF	(Scotland) SCO	Jim Murphy	19	2	10+6	2	3	0	0	0
	DF	(Scotland) SCO	Iain Phillip	9	1	8	1	0	0	1	0
	FW	(Scotland) SCO	Billy Pirie	35	18	30+1	16	3	2	1	0
	MF	(Scotland) SCO	Ian Redford	41	16	33+4	16	1+1	0	2	0
	DF	(Scotland) SCO	Erich Schaedler	31	1	27+1	1	3	0	0	0
	FW	(Scotland) SCO	Jocky Scott	5	0	1+4	0	0	0	0	0
	DF	(Scotland) SCO	Brian Scrimgeour	4	0	3	0	0+1	0	0	0
	MF	(Scotland) SCO	Jim Shirra	37	6	30+2	5	3	1	1+1	0
	FW	(Scotland) SCO	Eric Sinclair	35	13	27+4	10	2	2	2	1
	MF	(Scotland) SCO	Gordon Strachan	14	1	5+4	0	0	0	4+1	1
	DF	(Scotland) SCO	Willie Watson	39	0	34	0	3	0	2	0
	FW	(Scotland) SCO	Billy Williamson	23	4	20+3	4	0	0	0	0

== See also ==
- List of Dundee F.C. seasons
