= 1979–80 Dundee F.C. season =

Dundee
1979–80 season
- Manager: Tommy Gemmell (until Apr. 1980); Hugh Robertson (caretaker, from Apr. 1980)
- Premier Division: 9th (relegated)
- Scottish Cup: 3rd round
- League Cup: Quarter-finals
- Top goalscorer: League: Ian Redford (9); All: Eric Sinclair (14)
Home colours

The 1979–80 season was the 78th season in which Dundee competed at a Scottish national level, playing in the Premier Division after getting promoted the previous season. Once again however, the club would find themselves relegated at the end of the season. Dundee would also compete in both the Scottish League Cup and the Scottish Cup, where they would be eliminated by Hamilton Academical in the quarter-finals of the League Cup, and by Dundee United in the 3rd round of the Scottish Cup. They would also compete in the Anglo-Scottish Cup, being eliminated by English side Sheffield United in the quarter-finals.

== Scottish Premier Division ==
Statistics provided by Dee Archive.

Match day	Date	Opponent	H/A	Score	Dundee scorer(s)	Attendance
1	11 August	Dundee United	A	0–3		17,968
2	18 August	St Mirren	H	4–1	Redford (4) (pen.)	8,350
3	25 August	Hibernian	A	2–5	Paterson (o.g.), Redford (pen.)	7,344
4	8 September	Partick Thistle	H	2–2	Sinclair, Redford	6,400
5	15 September	Greenock Morton	H	4–3	MacLaren, Sinclair, Murphy, Redford	7,243
6	22 September	Rangers	A	0–2		23,000
7	29 September	Aberdeen	H	0–4		11,817
8	6 October	Kilmarnock	A	1–3	MacLaren	5,500
9	13 October	Celtic	A	0–3		23,483
10	20 October	Dundee United	H	1–0	Sinclair	16,305
11	27 October	St Mirren	A	2–4	McGeachie, Murphy	6,000
12	3 November	Hibernian	H	2–1	Millar, Fletcher	6,879
13	10 November	Partick Thistle	A	3–2	Millar, Pirie, Sinclair	5,500
14	17 November	Greenock Morton	A	0–2		6,500
15	24 November	Rangers	H	3–1	Pirie, Sinclair, Shirra	13,342
16	15 December	Kilmarnock	H	3–1	Mackie, Ferguson, Pirie	6,016
17	22 December	Dundee United	A	0–2		15,431
18	5 January	Partick Thistle	H	1–1	Pirie	6,788
19	12 January	Greenock Morton	H	1–0	Redford	7,922
20	2 February	Aberdeen	H	1–3	Redford	7,661
21	9 February	Kilmarnock	A	1–1	Fleming	4,500
22	23 February	Celtic	A	2–2	Murphy, Aitken (o.g.)	21,371
23	1 March	Dundee United	H	1–1	Shirra	15,116
24	8 March	St Mirren	A	1–2	Sinclair	6,000
25	12 March	Rangers	A	0–1		15,000
26	15 March	Hibernian	H	3–0	Corrigan, Shirra, Ferguson	8,065
27	19 March	Aberdeen	A	0–3		7,000
28	25 March	Hibernian	A	0–2		5,018
29	29 March	Greenock Morton	H	1–1	MacLaren	3,500
30	2 April	St Mirren	H	1–3	Ferguson	6,031
31	5 April	Rangers	H	1–4	Sinclair	12,948
32	9 April	Aberdeen	A	1–2	Fleming	11,600
33	12 April	Partick Thistle	A	0–3		5,000
34	19 April	Celtic	H	5–1	Ferguson (2) (pen.), Fleming, Sinclair, Mackie	14,633
35	26 April	Kilmarnock	A	0–2		4,600
36	30 April	Celtic	H	0–2		10,500

=== League table ===
Pos	Team	Pld	W	D	L	GF	GA	GD	Pts	Qualification or relegation
6	Morton	36	14	8	14	51	46	+5	36	
7	Partick Thistle	36	11	14	11	43	47	−4	36	
8	Kilmarnock	36	11	11	14	36	52	−16	33	
9	Dundee (R)	36	10	6	20	47	73	−26	26	Relegation to the 1980–81 Scottish First Division
10	Hibernian (R)	36	6	6	24	29	67	−38	18	Relegation to the 1980–81 Scottish First Division

Source: Statto and RSSSF
Rules for classification: 1) points; 2) goal difference; 3) number of goals scored.
(R) Relegated

== Scottish League Cup ==
Statistics provided by Dee Archive.

Match day	Date	Opponent	H/A	Score	Dundee scorer(s)	Attendance
1st round, 1st leg	29 August	Cowdenbeath	A	4–1	Sinclair (2), Shirra, Redford (pen.)	1,551
1st round, 2nd leg	1 September	Cowdenbeath	H	3–1	Sinclair, Shirra (2)	4,553
Dundee win 7–2 on aggregate
2nd round, 1st leg	26 September	Ayr United	H	2–1	Sinclair, Murphy	5,133
2nd round, 2nd leg	10 October	Ayr United	A	1–0	Redford	
Dundee win 3–1 on aggregate
Quarter-finals, 1st leg	31 October	Hamilton Academical	A	1–3	Sinclair	3,871
Quarter-finals, 2nd leg	14 November	Hamilton Academical	H	1–0	Pirie	5,696
Hamilton Accies win 3–2 on aggregate

== Scottish Cup ==
Statistics provided by Dee Archive.

Match day	Date	Opponent	H/A	Score	Dundee scorer(s)	Attendance
3rd round	30 January	Dundee United	A	1–5	Pirie	18,064

== Anglo-Scottish Cup ==
Statistics provided by Dee Archive.

Match day	Date	Opponent	H/A	Score	Dundee scorer(s)	Attendance
1st round, 1st leg	6 August	Kilmarnock	H	1–1	Shirra	3,832
1st round, 2nd leg	8 August	Kilmarnock	A	3–3	Sinclair, Redford (2) (pen.)	4,000
Aggregate tied at 4–4, Dundee win on away goals
Quarter-finals, 1st leg	4 September	(England) Sheffield United	A	1–2	Williamson	7,596
Quarter-finals, 2nd leg	11 September	(England) Sheffield United	H	0–1		6,866
Sheffield Utd win 3–1 on aggregate

== Player statistics ==
Statistics provided by Dee Archive

No.	Pos	Nat	Player	Total		First Division		Scottish Cup		League Cup		Anglo-Scottish Cup	
No.	Pos	Nat	Player	Apps	Goals	Apps	Goals	Apps	Goals	Apps	Goals	Apps	Goals
	DF	(Scotland) SCO	Les Barr	39	0	26+3	0	0+1	0	5	0	4	0
	DF	(Scotland) SCO	Alex Caldwell	5	0	2	0	0	0	1	0	0+2	0
	FW	(Scotland) SCO	Dennis Corrigan	7	1	2+5	1	0	0	0	0	0	0
	FW	(Scotland) SCO	Gerry Davidson	1	0	0	0	0	0	0+1	0	0	0
	GK	(Scotland) SCO	Ally Donaldson	46	0	36	0	1	0	6	0	3	0
	FW	(Scotland) SCO	Iain Ferguson	13	5	9+4	5	0	0	0	0	0	0
	FW	(Scotland) SCO	Ian Fleming	16	3	16	3	0	0	0	0	0	0
	FW	(Scotland) SCO	John Fletcher	24	1	12+4	1	0	0	4+1	0	3	0
	GK	(Scotland) SCO	Bobby Geddes	1	0	0	0	0	0	0	0	1	0
	DF	(Scotland) SCO	Bobby Glennie	46	0	35	0	1	0	5+1	0	4	0
	DF	(Scotland) SCO	Stewart MacLaren	35	3	27	3	1	0	5	0	2	0
	MF	(Scotland) SCO	Peter Mackie	23	2	22	2	1	0	0	0	0	0
	DF	(Scotland) SCO	George McGeachie	36	1	28	1	0	0	5+1	0	2	0
	FW	(Scotland) SCO	Alec McGhee	2	0	0+1	0	0	0	0+1	0	0	0
	DF	(Scotland) SCO	Peter Millar	33	2	26+2	2	1	0	4	0	0	0
	MF	(Scotland) SCO	Jim Murphy	42	4	28+3	3	1	0	5+1	1	4	0
	FW	(Scotland) SCO	Billy Pirie	12	6	9	4	1	1	2	1	0	0
	MF	(Scotland) SCO	Ian Redford	22	13	14	9	1	0	3	2	4	2
	DF	(Scotland) SCO	Erich Schaedler	30	0	27	0	1	0	2	0	0	0
	MF	(Scotland) SCO	Jim Shirra	41	7	27+4	3	1	0	3+2	3	4	1
	FW	(Scotland) SCO	Eric Sinclair	46	14	35	8	1	0	6	5	4	1
	DF	(South Africa) RSA	Stuart Turnball	18	0	8	0	0	0	6	0	4	0
	DF	(Scotland) SCO	Willie Watson	9	0	4+1	0	0	0	2	0	2	0
	FW	(Scotland) SCO	Billy Williamson	14	1	3+5	0	0	0	2+1	0	3	1

== See also ==
- List of Dundee F.C. seasons
