= 1980 Scottish League Cup final =

- Event: 1980–81 Scottish League Cup
Dundee United	Dundee
3	0
- Date: 6 December 1980
- Venue: Dens Park, Dundee
- Referee: Bob Valentine (Dundee)
- Attendance: 24,466

The 1980 Scottish League Cup final was played on 6 December 1980, at Dens Park in Dundee and was the final of the 35th Scottish League Cup competition. The final was a Dundee derby contested by Dundee United and Dundee. Dundee United won the match 3–0 thanks to goals by Davie Dodds and Paul Sturrock (2). This was United's second senior trophy victory following success the previous season in the same tournament. Dundee's Billy Williamson was playing against his previous club.

== Background ==
In the build up to the match The Glasgow Herald writer Jim Reynolds stated that he could not recall a major final in Scotland, including those contested by the Old Firm, which had attracted so much interest. Describing Dundee as the "football capital of Scotland" for the day of the match, Reynolds noted that the match had some features of a David vs Goliath struggle, albeit one with a difference as the two teams fortunes seemed to have switched over the previous few years. United who were the holders of the trophy had traditionally been the weaker side in Dundee, but were enjoying a period of success. By contrast, Dundee had for most of their history been the more successful club, but were now no longer in the top flight. This made United favourites with bookmakers and Reynolds also expected them to win.

== Match details ==
6 December 1980

Dundee United	3–0	Dundee
Dodds 44'; Sturrock 59', 82'	Report

Dens Park, Dundee
Attendance: 24,466

Dundee United:
GK	1	Hamish McAlpine
DF	2	John Holt
DF	3	Frank Kopel
MF	4	Iain Phillip
DF	5	Paul Hegarty (c)
DF	6	David Narey
MF	7	Eamonn Bannon
MF	8	Graeme Payne
FW	9	Willie Pettigrew
FW	10	Paul Sturrock
FW	11	Davie Dodds
Manager:
Jim McLean

Dundee:
GK	1	Bobby Geddes
DF	2	Les Barr
DF	3	Erich Schaedler
DF	4	Cammy Fraser
DF	5	Bobby Glennie (c)
DF	6	George McGeachie
MF	7	Peter Mackie
MF	8	Ray Stephen
FW	9	Eric Sinclair
MF	10	Billy Williamson
FW	11	Andy Geddes
Manager:
Don Mackay
