= 1977–78 Dundee F.C. season =

Dundee
1977–78 season
- Manager: Tommy Gemmell
- First Division: 3rd
- Scottish Cup: 3rd round
- League Cup: 3rd round
- Top goalscorer: League: Billy Pirie (35); All: Billy Pirie (38)
Home colours

The 1977–78 season was the 76th season in which Dundee competed at a Scottish national level, playing in the First Division for the second consecutive season. The club would again fail to achieve promotion, finishing in 3rd place for the second straight year. Dundee would also compete in both the Scottish League Cup and the Scottish Cup, where they would be eliminated by Queen of the South in the 3rd round of the League Cup, and by Celtic in the 3rd round of the Scottish Cup.

== Scottish First Division ==
Statistics provided by Dee Archive.

Match day	Date	Opponent	H/A	Score	Dundee scorer(s)	Attendance
1	13 August	Airdrieonians	H	3–0	Hutchinson, Pirie (pen.), Sinclair	5,467
2	20 August	Heart of Midlothian	A	1–2	Pirie	11,761
3	27 August	Stirling Albion	H	0–1		5,082
4	10 September	St Johnstone	A	2–1	Sinclair, Pirie	3,900
5	14 September	Alloa Athletic	A	5–3	Pirie (3), Sinclair, Redford	1,200
6	17 September	Dumbarton	H	2–1	Sinclair	4,725
7	24 September	Hamilton Academical	H	1–1	Williamson	2,500
8	28 September	Queen of the South	A	2–0	Pirie, Williamson	2,000
9	1 October	Kilmarnock	H	2–1	Williamson (2)	4,700
10	8 October	Montrose	A	2–1	Williamson, Pirie	2,000
11	15 October	East Fife	H	2–1	Pirie, MacKinnon	5,000
12	19 October	Arbroath	H	2–3	Pirie (2)	4,123
13	22 October	Airdrieonians	A	0–3		2,000
14	29 October	Heart of Midlothian	H	1–1	Williamson	9,074
15	5 November	Stirling Albion	A	2–0	Simpson, Pirie	2,479
16	12 November	St Johnstone	H	5–3	Pirie (3) (pen.), Sinclair	5,753
17	19 November	Dumbarton	A	0–0		1,700
18	26 November	Hamilton Academical	H	3–0	Williamson, Shirra, Sinclair	6,686
19	3 December	Kilmarnock	A	0–1		4,500
20	10 December	Montrose	H	4–1	Pirie (2), Sinclair, Williamson	5,108
21	17 December	East Fife	A	3–0	Pirie, Williamson, Scott	2,860
22	24 December	Greenock Morton	H	3–1	Pirie (2), McLean (o.g.)	12,458
23	31 December	Stirling Albion	A	3–2	Pirie (2), Sinclair	4,000
24	2 January	St Johnstone	H	3–4	Scott, Williamson (2)	12,785
25	7 January	Heart of Midlothian	A	2–2	Pirie, McDougall	19,720
26	14 January	Alloa Athletic	H	6–0	Pirie (4), Scott, Shirra	6,582
27	25 February	East Fife	H	2–0	Pirie, Redford	4,765
28	1 March	Montrose	A	3–0	Williamson, MacKinnon, Redford	1,450
29	4 March	Airdrieonians	A	3–3	Redford, McGeachie, Williamson	4,000
30	8 March	Hamilton Academical	A	1–0	Pirie	1,200
31	11 March	Queen of the South	H	3–0	Pirie (2), Redford	5,222
32	18 March	Arbroath	A	0–0		4,104
33	22 March	Kilmarnock	H	5–2	Redford (2), Williamson (2), Scott	5,295
34	25 March	Arbroath	H	2–0	Williamson, Sinclair	6,605
35	8 April	Greenock Morton	H	1–1	Redford	12,305
36	12 April	Dumbarton	A	1–2	Redford	2,000
37	15 April	Alloa Athletic	A	5–1	Pirie (3), McGeachie, Sinclair	2,000
38	22 April	Queen of the South	H	3–0	Sinclair, MacKinnon, Williamson	6,152
39	29 April	Greenock Morton	A	3–2	Redford, Glennie, Pirie	8,000

=== League table ===
Pos	Team	Pld	W	D	L	GF	GA	GD	Pts	Promotion or relegation
1	Morton (C, P)	39	25	8	6	85	42	+43	58	Promotion to the Premier Division
2	Heart of Midlothian (P)	39	24	10	5	77	42	+35	58	Promotion to the Premier Division
3	Dundee	39	25	7	7	91	44	+47	57	
4	Dumbarton	39	16	17	6	65	48	+17	49	
5	Stirling Albion	39	15	12	12	60	52	+8	42	

Source: RSSSF and statto
Rules for classification: 1) points; 2) goal difference; 3) number of goals scored.
(C) Champions; (P) Promoted

== Scottish League Cup ==
Statistics provided by Dee Archive.

Match day	Date	Opponent	H/A	Score	Dundee scorer(s)	Attendance
1st round, 1st leg	17 August	Montrose	A	3–1	Pirie, Strachan, Hutchinson	2,144
1st round, 2nd leg	24 August	Montrose	H	1–0	Pirie (pen.)	3,653
Dundee win 4–1 on aggregate
2nd round, 1st leg	31 August	Berwick Rangers	H	4–0	Sinclair (2), McDougall, Pirie	3,183
2nd round, 2nd leg	3 September	Berwick Rangers	A	1–1	McDougall	1,000
Dundee win 5–1 on aggregate
3rd round, 1st leg	5 October	Queen of the South	H	0–0		4,647
3rd round, 2nd leg	26 October	Queen of the South	A	0–6		3,500
QoS win 6–0 on aggregate

== Scottish Cup ==
Statistics provided by Dee Archive.

Match day	Date	Opponent	H/A	Score	Dundee scorer(s)	Attendance
3rd round	6 February	Celtic	A	1–7	Schaedler	22,000

== Player statistics ==
Statistics provided by Dee Archive

No.	Pos	Nat	Player	Total		First Division		Scottish Cup		League Cup	
No.	Pos	Nat	Player	Apps	Goals	Apps	Goals	Apps	Goals	Apps	Goals
	GK	(Scotland) SCO	Thomson Allan	19	0	17	0	0	0	2	0
	DF	(Scotland) SCO	Alex Caldwell	26	0	18+3	0	1	0	4	0
	MF	(Scotland) SCO	John Cord	2	0	0+1	0	0	0	0+1	0
	GK	(Scotland) SCO	Ally Donaldson	27	0	22	0	1	0	4	0
	MF	(Scotland) SCO	Bobby Ford	22	0	13+5	0	0	0	4	0
	DF	(Scotland) SCO	Tommy Gemmell	25	4	20	4	2	0	3	0
	DF	(Scotland) SCO	Bobby Glennie	13	1	13	1	0	0	0	0
	FW	(Scotland) SCO	Wilson Hoggan	2	0	0+1	0	0	0	0+1	0
	MF	(Scotland) SCO	Bobby Hutchinson	13	2	8+1	1	0	0	3+1	1
	DF	(Scotland) SCO	Davie Johnston	32	0	22+5	0	0	0	4+1	0
	FW	(Scotland) SCO	Jimmy Johnstone	3	0	2+1	0	0	0	0	0
	FW	(Scotland) SCO	Derek Laing	5	0	0+2	0	0	0	1+2	0
	DF	(Scotland) SCO	Dave MacKinnon	27	3	25	3	0	0	2	0
	DF	(Scotland) SCO	John MacPhail	39	0	34	0	1	0	4	0
	DF	(Scotland) SCO	John Martin	2	0	0	0	0	0	1+1	0
	FW	(Scotland) SCO	Roy McCormack	3	0	0+3	0	0	0	0	0
	MF	(Scotland) SCO	Ian McDougall	44	3	36+1	1	1	0	6	2
	DF	(Scotland) SCO	George McGeachie	16	2	12+3	2	0	0	1	0
	FW	(Scotland) SCO	Paddy Morris	1	0	0	0	0	0	0+1	0
	DF	(Scotland) SCO	Iain Phillip	21	0	14+1	0	1	0	5	0
	FW	(Scotland) SCO	Billy Pirie	46	38	39	35	1	0	6	3
	MF	(Scotland) SCO	Ian Redford	41	10	25+9	10	0+1	0	5+1	0
	MF	(Scotland) SCO	Bobby Robinson	1	0	0+1	0	0	0	0	0
	DF	(Scotland) SCO	Erich Schaedler	16	1	15	0	1	1	0	0
	FW	(Scotland) SCO	Jocky Scott	21	4	19+1	4	1	0	0	0
	MF	(Scotland) SCO	Jim Shirra	24	2	22+1	2	1	0	0	0
	FW	(Scotland) SCO	Alan Simpson	4	1	2+1	1	0	0	0+1	0
	FW	(Scotland) SCO	Eric Sinclair	38	15	27+6	13	1	0	4	2
	MF	(Scotland) SCO	Gordon Strachan	14	1	5+4	0	0	0	4+1	1
	DF	(Scotland) SCO	Stuart Turnbull	2	0	2	0	0	0	0	0
	FW	(Scotland) SCO	Billy Williamson	44	17	37	17	1	0	6	0

== See also ==
- List of Dundee F.C. seasons
