= 1985–86 Dumbarton F.C. season =

Dumbarton
1985–1986 season
- Manager: Davie Wilson/ Alex Wright (caretaker)
- Stadium: Boghead Park, Dumbarton
- Scottish League Division 1: 6th
- Scottish Cup: Third Round
- Scottish League Cup: Second Round
- Top goalscorer: League: Gerry McCoy (13); All: Gerry McCoy (14)
- Highest home attendance: 1,960
- Lowest home attendance: 400
- Average home league attendance: 1,170

Season 1985–86 was the 102nd football season in which Dumbarton competed at a Scottish national level, entering the Scottish Football League for the 80th time, the Scottish Cup for the 91st time and the Scottish League Cup for the 39th time.

== Overview ==
Dumbarton returned to the First Division as favourites for the title, and in mid October the team was sitting atop the league. However results took an inexplicable nosedive with 2 wins in 11 games, accounting for Davie Wilson's resignation at the beginning of February. Alex Wright took over as caretaker manager until the end of the season, and an initial run of only 2 defeats in 11 matches placed the club well clear in 2nd place with only 6 games remaining. However, 4 nervy defeats in those closing fixtures dropped Dumbarton to 6th place, 13 points behind champions Hamilton but only 2 points shy of 2nd placed Falkirk, and one of four clubs just missing out on a promotion spot.

In the Scottish Cup, Dumbarton lost embarrassingly to Second Division Queen's Park in the third round.

The League Cup was no better with another disappointing exit in the second round to Second Division Stirling Albion.

Locally, however, in the Stirlingshire Cup, there was something to smile about with the trophy returning to Boghead after a final win over Clydebank.

Finally, despite losing Premier Division status, Dumbarton were invited to participate in the annual televised indoor Tennent's Sixes tournament, as both Rangers and Celtic had declined to enter. After winning three of four qualifying matches, 1-0 vs St Mirren, 0-0 (4–3 on penalties) vs Dundee and 4-0 vs Manchester City and a 0–3 defeat to Hearts, Dumbarton suffered a narrow 1–0 defeat in the semi-final to the eventual tournament winners Aberdeen.

== Results & fixtures ==
Win Draw Loss

=== Scottish First Division ===
10 August 1985 First Division	Airdrie	0–2	Dumbarton	Broomfield Park
			McCoy 8'; Ashwood 71'	Attendance: 1,805; Referee: A Ferguson

17 August 1985 First Division	Dumbarton	1–2	Partick Thistle	Boghead Park
	McCoy 64'		Logan 12'; Law 66'	Attendance: 1,906; Referee: J McCluskey

24 August 1985 First Division	Dumbarton	4–0	Alloa Athletic	Boghead Park
	Bourke 50', 65'; McCoy 76', 81'			Attendance: 900; Referee: R O'Donnell

31 August 1985 First Division	Morton	1–2	Dumbarton	Cappielow Park
	Doak 55'		McCoy 67'; MacIver 88'	Attendance: 1,106; Referee: T Muirhead

7 September 1985 First Division	Dumbarton	2–2	Hamilton	Boghead Park
	Moore 4'; McCoy 74'		Clarke 17'; Brogan 65'	Attendance: 1,490; Referee: H Alexander

14 September 1985 First Division	Montrose	0–3	Dumbarton	Links Park
			MacIver 26'; McGowan 55'; Moore 85'	Attendance: 700; Referee: W Crombie

21 September 1985 First Division	Dumbarton	2–0	Falkirk	Boghead Park
	Craig 62'; Bourke 78'			Attendance: 1,400; Referee: D Syme

28 September 1985 First Division	Ayr United	0–1	Dumbarton	Somerset Park
			Moore 1'	Attendance: 1,502; Referee: G Evans

5 October 1985 First Division	Dumbarton	2–1	East Fife	Boghead Park
	McNeil 54'; MacIver 77'		Porter 34'	Attendance: 1,800; Referee: G Cumming

12 October 1985 First Division	Clyde	0–0	Dumbarton	Shawfield Stadium
				Attendance: 1,334; Referee: D Hope

19 October 1985 First Division	Dumbarton	1–0	Kilmarnock	Boghead Park
	McCoy 18'			Attendance: 1,500; Referee: J Duncan

26 October 1985 First Division	Brechin City	3–1	Dumbarton	Glebe Park, Brechin
	Perry 35' (pen.), 75'; Powell 81'		McCoy 80'	Attendance: 800; Referee: J Renton

2 November 1985 First Division	Dumbarton	1–1	Forfar Athletic	Boghead Park
	Bourke 67'		Scott 56'	Attendance: 1,200; Referee: R McLeish

9 November 1985 First Division	Hamilton	6–1	Dumbarton	Douglas Park
	Clarke 3', 85'; Mitchell 28'; Watters 38', 60', 79'		McCoy 26'	Attendance: 1,544; Referee: A Waddell

16 November 1985 First Division	Dumbarton	2–2	Montrose	Boghead Park
	McCoy 83'; MacIver 84'		Wright 23'; Allan 35'	Attendance: 1,150; Referee: J McGillvray

23 November 1985 First Division	Falkirk	0–0	Dumbarton	Brockville Park
				Attendance: 2,300; Referee: C Sinclair

7 December 1985 First Division	East Fife	1–0	Dumbarton	Bayview Park, Methil
	Murray 16'			Attendance: 724; Referee: T Muirhead

14 December 1985 First Division	Dumbarton	1–1	Clyde	Boghead Park
	MacIver 43'		Ahern 63' (pen.)	Attendance: 1,000; Referee: D McVicar

21 December 1985 First Division	Kilmarnock	1–4	Dumbarton	Rugby Park
	Bryson 15'		Bourke 6', 73'; Coyle, T 9'; Craig 83'	Attendance: 2,042; Referee: M Delaney

1 January 1986 First Division	Dumbarton	1–2	Morton	Boghead Park
	Docherty (pen.)		Turner; O'Hara	Attendance: 1,800; Referee: A Ferguson

18 January 1986 First Division	Dumbarton	4–1	Brechin City	Boghead Park
	MacIver 23', 47'; Docherty 61' (pen.); McCahill 68'		Eadie 60'	Attendance: 600; Referee: D Yeats

1 February 1986 First Division	Forfar Athletic	4–0	Dumbarton	Station Park, Forfar
	Clarke 24', 80'; Brewster 48'; Scott 69'			Attendance: 666; Referee: K Hope

4 February 1986 First Division	Alloa Athletic	2–4	Dumbarton	Recreation Park, Alloa
	Murray 25'; Thomson 73'		MacIver 9', 64'; Bourke 19', 24'	Attendance: 520; Referee: B McGinley

19 February 1986 First Division	Dumbarton	1–1	Ayr United	Boghead Park
	Coyle, O 82' (pen.)		Sludden 35'	Attendance: 500; Referee: D Syme

1 March 1986 First Division	Dumbarton	2–3	East Fife	Boghead Park
	Moore 17'; Craig 89'		McCafferty 1'; Kirk 9'; Murray 85'	Attendance: 800; Referee: A Ferguson

5 March 1986 First Division	Dumbarton	2–0	Ayr United	Boghead Park
	McCoy; Coyle, T 89'			Attendance: 720; Referee: R Valentine

8 March 1986 First Division	Partick Thistle	1–2	Dumbarton	Firhill Park
	Smith 6'		Craig 27'; Coyle, O 64'	Attendance: 1,848; Referee: T Muirhead

12 March 1986 First Division	Dumbarton	3–0	Airdrie	Boghead Park
	Coyle, T 12'; Coyle, O (pen.)			Attendance: 1,016; Referee: W Knowles

15 March 1986 First Division	Dumbarton	0–0	Clyde	Boghead Park
				Attendance: 800; Referee: G Sinclair

19 March 1986 First Division	Partick Thistle	2–2	Dumbarton	Firhill Park
	Watson 65', 74'		Colye, O 18'; McGowan, P 26'	Attendance: 1,713

25 March 1986 First Division	Morton	1–0	Dumbarton	Cappielow Park
	Robertson 22'			Attendance: 800; Referee: G Cumming

29 March 1986 First Division	Dumbarton	2–1	Falkirk	Boghead Park
	McCoy 38'; Coyle, T 65'		Martin 12'	Attendance: 1,410; Referee: D McVicar

5 April 1986 First Division	Brechin City	1–1	Dumbarton	Glebe Park, Brechin
	Perry 43'		McCoy 28'	Attendance: 523; Referee: J Duncan

9 April 1986 First Division	Dumbarton	0–2	Forfar Athletic	Boghead Park
			McKillop 17'; Farningham 62'	Attendance: 690; Referee: J Thow

12 April 1986 First Division	Airdrie	2–1	Dumbarton	Broomfield Park
	Flood 44'; Fairlie 85'		Craig 43'	Attendance: 1,000; Referee: I Cathcart

15 April 1986 First Division	Alloa Athletic	1–3	Dumbarton	Recreation Park, Alloa
	Smith 56'		Coyle, T 40', 73'; Craig 77'	Attendance: 400; Referee: J McCluskey

19 April 1986 First Division	Kilmarnock	3–0	Dumbarton	Rugby Park
	Bryson 20'; Clarke 84'; McGuire 89'			Attendance: 2,500; Referee: D Hope

26 April 1986 First Division	Dumbarton	1–4	Hamilton	Boghead Park
	MacIver 23'		Phillips 13'; Brogan 33', 40'; Clarke 89'	Attendance: 1,500; Referee: H Alexander

3 May 1986 First Division	Montrose	0–0	Dumbarton	Links Park
				Attendance: 500; Referee: R Valentine

=== Skol Cup ===
21 August 1985 League Cup round 2	Stirling Albion	1–1 (a.e.t.) (4-2 p)	Dumbarton	Annfield Stadium
	Hoggan 52'		McCoy 43'	Attendance: 980; Referee: K Hope

=== Scottish Cup ===
25 January 1986 Cup round 3	Queen's Park	1–0	Dumbarton	Hampden Park
	Caven 65'			Attendance: 1,733; Referee: I Cathcart

=== Stirlingshire Cup ===
4 December 1985 Semi-final	Dumbarton	0–0 (5-4 p)	Falkirk	Boghead Park

9 March 1986 Final	Dumbarton	2–1	Clydebank	Boghead Park
	Kay; Coyle, O 90'		Moore 53'	Referee: B McGinlay

=== Pre-season matches ===
1 August 1985 Friendly	Clydebank	3–0	Dumbarton	Kilbowie Park
	Larnach 27'; Moore 69'; McGhie 75'			Referee: D Hope

5 August 1985 Friendly	Vale of Leven	2–1	Dumbarton	Millburn Park
	Goal		Goal

6 August 1985 Friendly	Dumbarton	1–1	St Mirren	Boghead Park
	Ashwood 90'		Clark

== League table ==
Pos	Team	Pld	W	D	L	GF	GA	GD	Pts
4	Forfar Athletic	39	17	10	12	51	43	+8	44
5	East Fife	39	14	15	10	54	46	+8	43
6	Dumbarton	39	16	11	12	59	52	+7	43
7	Morton	39	14	11	14	57	63	−6	39
8	Partick Thistle	39	10	16	13	53	64	−11	36

Source: RSSSF and statto
Rules for classification: 1) points; 2) goal difference; 3) number of goals scored.

== Player statistics ==
=== Squad ===
No.	Pos	Nat	Player	Total		First Division		League Cup		Scottish Cup	
No.	Pos	Nat	Player	Apps	Goals	Apps	Goals	Apps	Goals	Apps	Goals
	GK	(Scotland) SCO	Gordon Arthur	40	0	38+0	0	1+0	0	1+0	0
	GK	(Scotland) SCO	Hugh Stevenson	1	0	1+0	0	0+0	0	0+0	0
	DF	(Scotland) SCO	Martin McGowan	20	0	19+0	0	0+0	0	1+0	0
	DF	(Scotland) SCO	Ray Montgomerie	26	0	22+2	0	1+0	0	1+0	0
	DF	(Scotland) SCO	Eric Schaedler	15	0	14+0	0	1+0	0	0+0	0
	DF	(Scotland) SCO	Mark Shanks	5	0	3+2	0	0+0	0	0+0	0
	MF	(Scotland) SCO	Mark Clougherty	38	0	37+0	0	0+0	0	1+0	0
	MF	(Scotland) SCO	Owen Coyle	16	5	11+5	5	0+0	0	0+0	0
	MF	(Scotland) SCO	Tommy Coyle	31	6	24+5	6	1+0	0	1+0	0
	MF	(Scotland) SCO	Albert Craig	34	6	29+3	6	1+0	0	1+0	0
	MF	(Scotland) SCO	Harry Curran	6	0	5+1	0	0+0	0	0+0	0
	MF	(Scotland) SCO	Danny Docherty	19	2	15+3	2	0+0	0	1+0	0
	MF	(Scotland) SCO	Alan Kay	22	0	19+2	0	1+0	0	0+0	0
	MF	(Scotland) SCO	Steve McCahill	21	1	19+0	1	1+0	0	1+0	0
	MF	(Scotland) SCO	Donald McNeil	17	1	16+0	1	1+0	0	0+0	0
	MF	(Scotland) SCO	Jackie Rafferty	6	0	6+0	0	0+0	0	0+0	0
	MF	(Scotland) SCO	Jim Simpson	7	0	3+4	0	0+0	0	0+0	0
	MF	(Scotland) SCO	Ken Thomson	5	0	4+1	0	0+0	0	0+0	0
	FW	(Scotland) SCO	Kenny Ashwood	2	1	2+0	1	0+0	0	0+0	0
	FW	(Scotland) SCO	John Bourke	28	8	25+2	8	0+0	0	1+0	0
	FW	(Scotland) SCO	Joe Coyle	2	0	2+0	0	0+0	0	0+0	0
	FW	(Scotland) SCO	Gerry Crawley	21	0	20+0	0	0+1	0	0+0	0
	FW	(Scotland) SCO	Stuart MacIver	31	10	13+16	10	0+1	0	1+0	0
	FW	(Scotland) SCO	Gerry McCoy	34	14	29+3	13	1+0	1	0+1	0
	FW	(Scotland) SCO	Pat McGowan	31	2	25+4	2	1+0	0	1+0	0
	FW	(Scotland) SCO	Allan Moore	34	4	26+7	4	1+0	0	0+0	0
	FW	(Scotland) SCO	Paul Taylor	2	0	1+1	0	0+0	0	0+0	0
	FW	(Scotland) SCO	Mark Williams	2	0	1+1	0	0+0	0	0+0	0

== Transfers ==
=== Players in ===
Player	From	Date
(Scotland) Eric Schaedler	(Scotland) Hibernian	6 Jul 1985
(Scotland) Jackie Rafferty	(Scotland) Shamrock BC	12 Jul 1985
(Scotland) Gerry McCoy	(Scotland) Falkirk	13 Jul 1985
(Scotland) Hugh Stevenson	(Scotland) Clackmannan	20 Jul 1985
(Scotland) Ken Thomson	(Scotland) Campsie Black Watch	20 Jul 1985
(Scotland) Mark Williams	(Scotland) East Fife	5 Oct 1985
(Scotland) Paul Taylor	(England) Mansfield Town	24 Oct 1985
(Scotland) Danny Docherty	(Scotland) Morton	26 Oct 1985
(Scotland) Mark Shanks	(Scotland) Ayr United	9 Nov 1985

=== Players out ===
Player	To	Date
(Scotland) David McCaig	(Scotland) East Fife	23 Jul 1985
(Scotland) Stuart Robertson	(Scotland) Falkirk	7 Aug 1985
(Scotland) Kenny Ashwood	(Scotland) Ayr United	7 Sep 1985
(Scotland) Joe Coyle	(Scotland) Morton	26 Oct 1985
(Scotland) Jim Simpson	(Scotland) Morton	26 Oct 1985
(Scotland) Mark Williams	(England) Bognor Regis Town	

== Reserve team ==
Dumbarton competed in the Scottish Reserve League (West), winning 10 and drawing 5 of 18 matches finishing runners up to Airdrie.

In the Reserve League Cup Dumbarton lost in the second round to Celtic.

== Trivia ==
- The League match against Partick Thistle on 17 August marked Ray Montgomerie's 100th appearance for Dumbarton in all national competitions - the 91st Dumbarton player to reach this milestone.
- The League match against Clyde on 15 March marked Mark Clougherty's 200th appearance for Dumbarton in all national competitions - the 19th Dumbarton player to break the 'double century'.
- Early in the season there was a tragic death in the playing staff - that of popular defender Eric Schaedler. Eric had been signed up in the close season and had become a firm favourite with the Dumbarton fans.

== See also ==
- 1985–86 in Scottish football
