= Peter Mackie =

Peter Mackie may refer to:

- Sir Peter Mackie, 1st Baronet (1855–1924), Scottish distiller
- Peter Mackie (footballer) (born 1958), Scottish footballer
- Peter Mackie, Australian bassist of The Cockroaches
