= 1985–86 Scottish Football League =

Scottish football season

Statistics of the Scottish Football League in season 1985–86.

== Scottish Premier Division ==
Celtic won the League and became champions in one of the closest finishes in League history. On the final day of the season Hearts were leading Celtic by two points - a draw against Dundee would have been sufficient to see them win their first League title since the 1959–60 season. Hearts lost 2–0 to Dundee at Dens Park thanks to two goals by substitute Albert Kidd; the first in the 83rd minute and the second in the final minute while Celtic beat St Mirren 5–0 at Love Street. As a result, Celtic won the league on goal difference.

Relegation was suspended due to league reconstruction, therefore Motherwell and Clydebank retained their Premier Division status.

Pos	Team	Pld	W	D	L	GF	GA	GD	Pts	Qualification
1	Celtic (C)	36	20	10	6	67	38	+29	50	Qualification for the European Cup first round
2	Heart of Midlothian	36	20	10	6	59	33	+26	50	Qualification for the UEFA Cup first round
3	Dundee United	36	18	11	7	59	31	+28	47	Qualification for the UEFA Cup first round
4	Aberdeen	36	16	12	8	62	31	+31	44	Qualification for the Cup Winners' Cup first round
5	Rangers	36	13	9	14	53	45	+8	35	Qualification for the UEFA Cup first round
6	Dundee	36	14	7	15	45	51	−6	35	
7	St Mirren	36	13	5	18	42	63	−21	31	
8	Hibernian	36	11	6	19	49	63	−14	28	
9	Motherwell	36	7	6	23	33	66	−33	20	
10	Clydebank	36	6	8	22	29	77	−48	20	

Source: Rsssf
Rules for classification: 1) points; 2) goal difference; 3) number of goals scored.
(C) Champions

== Scottish First Division ==
Pos	Team	Pld	W	D	L	GF	GA	GD	Pts	Promotion or relegation
1	Hamilton Academical (C, P)	39	24	8	7	77	44	+33	56	Promotion to the Premier Division
2	Falkirk (P)	39	17	11	11	57	39	+18	45	Promotion to the Premier Division
3	Kilmarnock	39	18	8	13	62	49	+13	44	
4	Forfar Athletic	39	17	10	12	51	43	+8	44	
5	East Fife	39	14	15	10	54	46	+8	43	
6	Dumbarton	39	16	11	12	59	52	+7	43	
7	Morton	39	14	11	14	57	63	−6	39	
8	Partick Thistle	39	10	16	13	53	64	−11	36	
9	Airdrieonians	39	12	11	16	51	50	+1	35	
10	Brechin City	39	13	9	17	58	64	−6	35	
11	Clyde	39	9	17	13	49	59	−10	35	
12	Montrose	39	10	14	15	43	54	−11	34	
13	Ayr United (R)	39	10	11	18	41	60	−19	31	Relegation to the Second Division
14	Alloa Athletic (R)	39	6	14	19	49	74	−25	26	Relegation to the Second Division

Source: RSSSF and statto
Rules for classification: 1) points; 2) goal difference; 3) number of goals scored.
(C) Champions; (P) Promoted; (R) Relegated

== Scottish Second Division ==
Pos	Team	Pld	W	D	L	GF	GA	GD	Pts	Promotion
1	Dunfermline Athletic (C, P)	39	23	11	5	91	47	+44	57	Promotion to the First Division
2	Queen of the South (P)	39	23	9	7	71	36	+35	55	Promotion to the First Division
3	Meadowbank Thistle	39	19	11	9	68	45	+23	49	
4	Queen's Park	39	19	8	12	61	39	+22	46	
5	Stirling Albion	39	18	8	13	57	53	+4	44	
6	St Johnstone	39	18	6	15	63	55	+8	42	
7	Stenhousemuir	39	16	8	15	55	63	−8	40	
8	Arbroath	39	15	9	15	56	50	+6	39	
9	Raith Rovers	39	15	7	17	67	65	+2	37	
10	Cowdenbeath	39	14	9	16	52	53	−1	37	
11	East Stirlingshire	39	11	6	22	49	69	−20	28	
12	Berwick Rangers	39	7	11	21	45	80	−35	25	
13	Albion Rovers	39	8	8	23	38	86	−48	24	
14	Stranraer	39	9	5	25	41	83	−42	23	

Source: "1985-1986 Second Division - SPFL Archive". SPFL.
Rules for classification: 1) points; 2) goal difference; 3) number of goals scored.
(C) Champions; (P) Promoted

== See also ==
- 1985–86 in Scottish football
