= Vic Kasule =

Scottish footballer

Personal information
- Full name: Victor Peter Kasule
- Date of birth: 28 May 1965 (age 61)
- Place of birth: Glasgow, Scotland
- Position: Winger

Senior career*
Years	Team	Apps	(Gls)
1982–1986	Albion Rovers	132	(18)
1986–1987	Meadowbank Thistle	35	(7)
1987–1989	Shrewsbury Town	40	(4)
1989	→ Darlington (loan)	1	(0)
1989–1990	Hamilton Academical	12	(0)
- Portadown
- RTP
- Ħamrun Spartans
1992–1993	Montrose	1	(0)
Total		220	(29)
- * Club domestic league appearances and goals

Victor Peter Kasule (born 28 May 1965) is a Scottish former professional footballer who played mostly as a winger for several clubs, including Albion Rovers, Meadowbank Thistle, Shrewsbury Town, Darlington, Hamilton Academical, Portadown, Bohemians and Montrose. He also had brief spells playing in Finland and Malta.

== Background ==
Kasule was born in Glasgow on 28 May 1965 to a Scottish mother and Ugandan father. His mother was a teacher and his father a professor of zoology. His father died when Kasule was 15.

== Football career ==
=== Albion Rovers ===
He signed for Albion Rovers in 1982 as a 17-year-old scoring on his debut. Rovers struggled near the bottom of the Scotland's lowest of three senior tiers throughout Kasule's time there. He scored 18 goals in total in his 132 league appearances. His form earned him a transfer for a £28,000 fee.

=== Meadowbank Thistle ===
After him playing nine league games of the 1986-87 Scottish Second Division campaign Meadowbank Thistle transferred Darren Jackson to Newcastle United in October 1986. It was from Jackson's transfer fee that Terry Christie managing Meadowbank funded their £28,000 record signing of 21 year old Kasule. When playing for Meadowbank, Kasule was one of the first black players in the Scottish game - a fact that the Meadowbank supporters were proud of. He was though regularly subjected to racist abuse. Kasule and Thistle won the 1986–87 Scottish Second Division earning promotion for the next season to the middle of Scotland's then three tiers in senior football. Thistle finished runners-up in the 1987-88 Scottish First Division missing promotion to the top tier by one place. However Kasule had already left halfway through the season. In 15 months at Meadowbank he played in 35 league games in which he scored 7 goals.

=== Shrewsbury Town ===
Aged 22, Kasule gave up a place at the University of Glasgow to join Shrewsbury Town in England's second tier in January 1988 for a £35,000 transfer fee. At Shrewsbury The Guardian referred to him as, "an armoured car of a right winger with a cannon for a shot". Geoff Tibballs in Football Greatest Characters, wrote Kasule's match winner against Leeds in 1988 "was rated one of the most spectacular even seen at Gay Meadow". However his football talents increasingly became overshadowed by off-field mis-demeanours. This often came from drinking with fellow Scots, Dougie Bell, Alan Irvine and Steve Pittman. Other teammates at the Shrews included David Linighan, Davie Moyes, Jim Melrose, John McGinlay and Tony Kelly. Kasule played only 11 games in the 1988—89 relegation season with alcohol reportedly an increasing distraction for him. Ian McNeill resisted pressure from the club chairman to sell him in the close season and persisted with him for the start of the 1989–90 season. However Kasule lasted only five games before missing another curfew and was transferred within a month. Initially this was a loan deal to Darlington, where he played one league game and one FA Cup tie, before a permanent move back to Scotland.

=== Hamilton Academical ===
Aged 24 Kasule joined Hamilton Academical in the second of then three senior Scottish divisions for a cut price £15,000 fee. He came on against local rivals Airdrieonians as a sub 2—0 down with 20 minutes to go. He set up three goals to seal an unlikely comeback. However his off field problems soon returned. After playing 12 games he was arrested after an incident in Shrewsbury where he had revisited to attend a party.

=== Later career ===
He then had a succession of brief stints with clubs in Northern Ireland, Scotland, Finland and Malta. He retired from senior football aged 29 due to an achilles injury.

== After playing ==
In 1996 he was reported in The Independent as having qualifications in accounting from Glasgow University and working in telephone banking. An article on the Albion Rovers club website in December 2016 stated Kasule was a community coach for BSC Glasgow.

Kasule was a survivor of the Clutha Vaults 2013 Glasgow helicopter crash.

== Honours and accolades ==
Team:

- Meadowbank Thistle - 1986–87 Scottish Second Division champions

Individual:

- "Albion Rovers' all-time cult hero" run by Football Focus of the BBC in 2005.
