= 1985–86 Scottish First Division =

Scottish First Division
- Season: 1985–86
- Champions: Hamilton Academical
- Promoted: Hamilton Academical; Falkirk
- Relegated: Ayr United; Alloa Athletic
- Matches played: 273
- Goals scored: 761 (2.79 per match)
- Top goalscorer: Ken Eadie (22)
- Biggest home win: Kilmarnock 5–0 Partick Thistle, 07.09.1985
- Biggest away win: Forfar Athletic 0–4 Alloa Athletic, 28.09.1985

The 1985–86 Scottish First Division season was won by Hamilton Academical, who were promoted along with Falkirk to the Premier Division. Ayr United and Alloa Athletic were relegated to the Second Division.

== League table ==
| Pos | Team | Pld | W | D | L | GF | GA | GD | Pts | Promotion or relegation |
|---|---|---|---|---|---|---|---|---|---|---|
| 1 | Hamilton Academical (C, P) | 39 | 24 | 8 | 7 | 77 | 44 | +33 | 56 | Promotion to the Premier Division |
| 2 | Falkirk (P) | 39 | 17 | 11 | 11 | 57 | 39 | +18 | 45 | Promotion to the Premier Division |
| 3 | Kilmarnock | 39 | 18 | 8 | 13 | 62 | 49 | +13 | 44 | |
| 4 | Forfar Athletic | 39 | 17 | 10 | 12 | 51 | 43 | +8 | 44 | |
| 5 | East Fife | 39 | 14 | 15 | 10 | 54 | 46 | +8 | 43 | |
| 6 | Dumbarton | 39 | 16 | 11 | 12 | 59 | 52 | +7 | 43 | |
| 7 | Morton | 39 | 14 | 11 | 14 | 57 | 63 | −6 | 39 | |
| 8 | Partick Thistle | 39 | 10 | 16 | 13 | 53 | 64 | −11 | 36 | |
| 9 | Airdrieonians | 39 | 12 | 11 | 16 | 51 | 50 | +1 | 35 | |
| 10 | Brechin City | 39 | 13 | 9 | 17 | 58 | 64 | −6 | 35 | |
| 11 | Clyde | 39 | 9 | 17 | 13 | 49 | 59 | −10 | 35 | |
| 12 | Montrose | 39 | 10 | 14 | 15 | 43 | 54 | −11 | 34 | |
| 13 | Ayr United (R) | 39 | 10 | 11 | 18 | 41 | 60 | −19 | 31 | Relegation to the Second Division |
| 14 | Alloa Athletic (R) | 39 | 6 | 14 | 19 | 49 | 74 | −25 | 26 | Relegation to the Second Division |

Source: RSSSF and statto
Rules for classification: 1) points; 2) goal difference; 3) number of goals scored.
(C) Champions; (P) Promoted; (R) Relegated
