= Stewart McKimmie =

Scottish footballer

Personal information
- Full name: Stewart McKimmie
- Date of birth: 27 October 1962 (age 64)
- Place of birth: Aberdeen, Scotland
- Height: 1.73 m (5 ft 8 in)
- Position: Defender

Youth career
- Banks O' Dee

Senior career*
Years	Team	Apps	(Gls)
1980–1983	Dundee	81	(0)
1983–1997	Aberdeen	430	(9)
1997–1998	Dundee United	10	(0)
Total		521	(9)

International career
1984–1985	Scotland U21	3	(0)
1987	Scotland B	1	(0)
1989–1996	Scotland	40	(1)
1990	SFA (SFL centenary)	1	(0)
- * Club domestic league appearances and goals

Stewart McKimmie (born 27 October 1962) is a Scottish former professional footballer, who predominantly played for home town club Aberdeen. He played in defence, primarily as a right-back, and also played for Dundee and Dundee United. He later wrote a weekly column in the Evening Express, as well as appearing as a pundit on Northsound 2's Friday Sport.

== Club career ==
McKimmie signed for hometown club Aberdeen in 1983 from Dundee, as a replacement for Stuart Kennedy who had been forced to retire due to injury. He won the European Super Cup shortly after joining, and would go on to win two Scottish League Championships in 1984 and 1985, three Scottish Cups in 1984, 1986 and 1990 and three Scottish League Cups in 1985, 1989 and the last in 1995, as captain of the club, in addition to involvement in several further runners-up finishes in the Premier Division and losing cup finals. He left Aberdeen in 1997, having made 561 appearances for the Dons in all competitions, and finished his career with Dundee United.

== International career ==
He won 40 international caps for Scotland, appearing in the 1990 World Cup, the 1992 European Football Championship and 1996 European Football Championship. He scored once for Scotland, the only goal in a friendly game against world champions Argentina prior to the 1990 World Cup.

== Career statistics ==
=== Club ===
Appearances and goals by club, season and competition
Club	Season	League			Scottish Cup		League Cup		Europe		Total	
Club	Season	Division	Apps	Goals	Apps	Goals	Apps	Goals	Apps	Goals	Apps	Goals
Dundee	1980–81	Scottish First Division	18	0	0	0	0	0	0	0	18	0
Dundee	1981–82	Scottish Premier Division	16	0	2	0	4	0	0	0	22	0
Dundee	1982–83	Scottish Premier Division	31	0	2	0	6	0	0	0	39	0
Dundee	1983–84	Scottish Premier Division	16	0	0	0	8	0	0	0	24	0
Dundee	Total		81	0	4	0	18	0	0	0	103	0
Aberdeen	1983–84	Scottish Premier Division	18	1	6	0	0	0	5	0	29	1
Aberdeen	1984–85	Scottish Premier Division	34	3	5	0	1	0	2	0	42	3
Aberdeen	1985–86	Scottish Premier Division	34	3	5	0	6	0	6	0	51	3
Aberdeen	1986–87	Scottish Premier Division	37	0	3	0	3	0	2	0	45	0
Aberdeen	1987–88	Scottish Premier Division	42	0	5	0	5	0	3	0	55	0
Aberdeen	1988–89	Scottish Premier Division	35	0	5	0	5	0	2	0	47	0
Aberdeen	1989–90	Scottish Premier Division	33	0	5	0	5	0	2	0	45	0
Aberdeen	1990–91	Scottish Premier Division	25	1	0	0	4	0	4	0	33	1
Aberdeen	1991–92	Scottish Premier Division	39	0	1	0	2	0	2	0	44	0
Aberdeen	1992–93	Scottish Premier Division	14	0	3	0	3	0	0	0	20	0
Aberdeen	1993–94	Scottish Premier Division	40	0	5	0	2	0	4	0	51	0
Aberdeen	1994–95	Scottish Premier Division	36	1	0	0	4	0	2	0	42	1
Aberdeen	1995–96	Scottish Premier Division	29	0	3	0	5	0	0	0	37	0
Aberdeen	1996–97	Scottish Premier Division	14	0	0	0	2	0	5	0	21	0
Aberdeen	Total		430	9	46	0	47	0	39	0	562	9
Dundee United	1996–97	Scottish Premier Division	4	0	1	0	0	0	0	0	5	0
Dundee United	1997–98	Scottish Premier Division	6	0	0	0	0	0	3	0	9	0
Dundee United	Total		10	0	1	0	0	0	3	0	14	0
Career total			521	9	51	0	65	0	42	0	679	9

=== International ===
Appearances and goals by national team and year
National team	Year	Apps	Goals
Scotland	1989	2	0
Scotland	1990	7	1
Scotland	1991	3	0
Scotland	1992	8	0
Scotland	1993	4	0
Scotland	1994	7	0
Scotland	1995	5	0
Scotland	1996	4	0
Total		40	1

Scores and results list Scotland's goal tally first, score column indicates score after each McKimmie goal

List of international goals scored by Stewart McKimmie
No.	Date	Venue	Opponent	Score	Result	Competition
1	28 March 1990	Hampden Park, Glasgow, Scotland	Argentina	1–0	1–0	Friendly

== Honours ==
- Scottish Premier League: 1983–84, 1984–85
- Scottish Cup: 1983–84, 1985–86, 1989–90
- Scottish League Cup: 1985–86, 1989–90, 1995–96
- European Super Cup: 1983

== See also ==
- List of footballers in Scotland by number of league appearances (500+)
