= Billy Williamson (footballer, born 1952) =

Scottish footballer

Personal information
- Full name: William David Williamson
- Date of birth: 29 September 1952 (age 74)
- Place of birth: Dumfries, Scotland
- Height: 5 ft 11 in (1.80 m)
- Position: Left back

Youth career
- 1969–1970: Kirkconnel F.C.

Senior career*
Years	Team	Apps	(Gls)
1971–1977	Aberdeen	95	(18)
1977	Dundee United	11	(1)
1977–1981	Dundee	88	(22)
1981–1983	Brisbane Lions	61	(22)
1983–1988	North Star		
Total		255+	(73+)
- * Club domestic league appearances and goals

William Davidson Williamson (born 29 September 1952) is a Scottish former professional footballer who played as a winger for Aberdeen, Dundee United and Dundee. Williamson played in two Scottish League Cup Finals, winning the trophy once.

== Career ==
Williamson was born in Dumfries. He scored 25 goals in what he played for Kirkconnel F.C. in the 1969–70 season.

Williamson joined Aberdeen in 1969. In 1975 he scored a hat-trick for Aberdeen in a 3–2 win against Celtic when playing at the time in midfield. He became only the second player at the time to score three or more goals in a single game playing for Aberdeen against Celtic, following in the footsteps of George Hamilton. Williamson picked up a winners medal from the 1976 Scottish League Cup Final 2–1 victory against Celtic. In his 92 league appearances he scored 19 goals.

In 1977 Williamson became only the second player to transfer directly from Aberdeen to Dundee United. His stay at Tannadice was short with his league appearances adding up to only 11 games in which he scored once. Williamson in 1977 became the fourth player to transfer directly from Dundee United to Dundee. In his 87 league appearances he scored 22 goals. Williamson was a member of the Dundee team which contested the 1980 Scottish League Cup final with Dundee United, losing 3–0.

Williamson then played for Brisbane Lions and North Star in Brisbane, Australia. He captained North Star to a 1988 XXXX League Grand Final win over Brisbane City before becoming North Star's coach.

== Career statistics ==
=== Appearances and goals by club, season and competition ===
Appearances and goals by club, season and competition
Club	Season	League			National Cup		League Cup		Europe		Total	
Club	Season	Division	Apps	Goals	Apps	Goals	Apps	Goals	Apps	Goals	Apps	Goals
Aberdeen	1970–71	Scottish Division One	1	0	0	0	0	0	0	0	1	0
Aberdeen	1971–72	Scottish Division One	0	0	0	0	3	0	0	0	3	0
Aberdeen	1972–73	Scottish Division One	13	0	3	0	0	0	0	0	16	0
Aberdeen	1973–74	Scottish Division One	4	0	0	0	7	1	0	0	11	1
Aberdeen	1974–75	Scottish Division One	31	9	4	0	2	1	0	0	37	10
Aberdeen	1975–76	Scottish Premier Division	37	8	2	0	4	1	0	0	43	9
Aberdeen	1976–77	Scottish Premier Division	9	1	0	0	7	2	0	0	16	3
Aberdeen	Total		95	18	9	0	23	5	0	0	127	23
Dundee United	1976–77	Scottish Premier Division	11	1	0	0	0	0	0	0	11	1
Dundee United	1977–78	Scottish Premier Division	0	0	0	0	0	0	0	0	0	0
Dundee United	Total		11	1	0	0	0	0	0	0	11	1
Dundee	1977–78	Scottish First Division	37	17	1	0	6	0	–	–	44	17
Dundee	1978–79	Scottish First Division	23	4	0	0	0	0	–	–	23	4
Dundee	1979–80	Scottish Premier Division	8	0	0	0	2	0	0	0	10	0
Dundee	1980–81	Scottish First Division	20	1	1	0	5	1	–	–	26	2
Dundee	Total		88	22	2	0	13	1	0	0	103	23
Brisbane Lions	1981	National Soccer League	11	9	2	3	–	–	–	–	13	12
Brisbane Lions	1982	National Soccer League	27	10	2	1	–	–	–	–	29	11
Brisbane Lions	1983	National Soccer League	23	3	0	0	–	–	–	–	23	3
Brisbane Lions	Total		61	22	4	4	-	-	-	-	65	26
Career total			255+	63+	15+	4+	36+	6+	0	0	306+	73+

== Honours ==
Aberdeen

- Scottish League Cup: 1976–77

Dundee

- Scottish League Cup: finalist 1980–81
