= Paul Taylor (footballer, born 1966) =

Scottish footballer

Personal information
- Full name: Paul Taylor
- Date of birth: 20 December 1966 (age 59)
- Place of birth: Leith, Scotland
- Position: Midfielder

Senior career*
Years	Team	Apps	(Gls)
1983–1984	Mansfield Town	3	(0)
1985–1986	Dumbarton	2	(0)
1986–1987	Berwick Rangers	26	(2)
1987–1989	Whitburn		
1989–1991	East Fife	74	(7)
1991–199?	Whitburn		
- * Club domestic league appearances and goals

Paul Taylor (born 20 December 1966) was a Scottish footballer who played as a midfielder for Mansfield Town, Dumbarton, Berwick Rangers, Whitburn and East Fife.
