= Ian MacLeod (footballer) =

Scottish footballer

Personal information
- Date of birth: 19 November 1959
- Place of birth: East Kilbride, Scotland
- Date of death: 6 May 2013 (aged 53)

Youth career
- Claremont Boys' Club

Senior career*
Years	Team	Apps	(Gls)
1978–1986	Motherwell	243	(3)
1986–1988	Falkirk	68	(0)
1989–1993	Raith Rovers	146	(4)
1993–1994	Meadowbank Thistle	21	(0)
- Larkhall Thistle
Total		478	(7)
- * Club domestic league appearances and goals

Ian MacLeod (19 November 1959 – 6 May 2013) was a Scottish footballer who played as a defender.

MacLeod started his career with Motherwell F.C. in 1978 and went on to make 243 appearances for the Fir Park club. He also played for Falkirk, Raith Rovers and Meadowbank Thistle

MacLeod died on 6 May 2013, aged 53.
