= Jackie Rafferty =

Scottish footballer

Personal information
- Full name: John Rafferty
- Date of birth: 3 May 1966 (age 60)
- Place of birth: Greenock, Scotland
- Position: Centre half

Youth career
- Bellaire, Gourock United, Shamrock BC

Senior career*
Years	Team	Apps	(Gls)
1985–1987	Dumbarton	9	(0)
1987–1988	Partick Thistle	14	(0)
- * Club domestic league appearances and goals

John 'Jackie' Rafferty (born 3 May 1966) was a Scottish footballer who played for Dumbarton and Partick Thistle.
