= Danny Docherty =

Scottish footballer

Personal information
- Full name: Daniel Docherty
- Date of birth: 12 April 1961 (age 65)
- Place of birth: Cambuslang, Scotland
- Position: Midfielder

Youth career
- Cambuslang Rangers

Senior career*
Years	Team	Apps	(Gls)
1978–1983	Morton	62	(4)
1983–1984	Clyde	6	(2)
1983–1986	Morton	71	(5)
1985–1987	Dumbarton	40	(2)
1987–1989	Queen of the South	52	(2)
- * Club domestic league appearances and goals

Daniel 'Danny' Docherty (born 12 April 1961) is a Scottish footballer who played for Morton, Clyde, Dumbarton and Queen of the South.
