= Peter Millar (footballer) =

Scottish footballer (1951–2013)

Personal information
- Date of birth: 21 April 1951
- Place of birth: Motherwell, Scotland
- Height: 6 ft 0 in (1.83 m)
- Positions: Defender; midfielder

Senior career*
Years	Team	Apps	(Gls)
- Forth Wanderers
1969–1970	Arbroath	8	(2)
1970–1972	Dunfermline Athletic	26	(3)
1972–1979	Motherwell	179	(17)
1979–1980	Dundee	44	(2)
1980–1983	Phoenix Inferno	129	(57)
1983–1985	Cleveland Force	63	(15)
Total		449	(96)

International career
1974	Scottish League XI	1	(0)
- * Club domestic league appearances and goals

Peter Millar (21 April 1951 – 17 June 2013) was a Scottish footballer who played as a defender or midfielder.

Millar is best known for his time at Motherwell where he made 178 league appearances from 1972 to 1979; he also played for Arbroath, Dunfermline Athletic and Dundee before rounding off his career in the United States where he played for Phoenix Inferno and Cleveland Force.

.
