= Ian McDougall (footballer) =

Scottish footballer

Personal information
- Full name: Ian McDougall
- Date of birth: 14 August 1954 (age 72)
- Place of birth: Baillieston, Scotland
- Position: Midfielder

Senior career*
Years	Team	Apps	(Gls)
1973–1977	Rangers	31	(3)
1977–1979	Dundee	53	(2)
1980	Berwick Rangers	2	(0)
1981	Albion Rovers	4	(0)

International career
1975	Scotland U23	1	(0)
- * Club domestic league appearances and goals

Ian McDougall (born 14 August 1954 in Baillieston) is a Scottish former professional football player who is best known for his time with Rangers and Dundee.

McDougall began his career at Pollok F.C. during which time he was one of the club's most prolific scorers scoring over 50 goals in one season. He then joined Rangers in 1973 where, for reasons not fully known they decided to play him as more of a midfielder rather than striker as he had been with Pollok, meaning he never replicated his high scoring at senior level. A two-year stay at Dundee followed in 1977 before brief spells with Berwick Rangers and Albion Rovers.
