= Colin McGlashan =

Scottish footballer

Personal information
- Full name: Colin McGlashan
- Date of birth: 17 March 1964 (age 62)
- Place of birth: Perth, Scotland
- Position: Striker

Youth career
- Celtic Boys Club

Senior career*
Years	Team	Apps	(Gls)
1982–1984	Dundee	11	(1)
1984	Dunfermline Athletic	16	(1)
1984–1986	Cowdenbeath	60	(27)
1986–1990	Clyde	140	(48)
1990–1993	Partick Thistle	103	(30)
1993–1994	Ayr United	36	(3)
1994–1998	Montrose	141	(67)
1998–2001	Arbroath	88	(33)
2001–2004	Elgin City	14	(0)
Total		609	(210)
- * Club domestic league appearances and goals

Colin McGlashan (born 17 March 1964 in Perth, Scotland), is a Scottish former football striker. In a career spanning 22 seasons, McGlashan played for 9 professional football clubs and scored 210 goals in 609 league appearances.

== Career ==
McGlashan spent his youth career with Celtic Boys Club. He signed for Dundee at the start of the 1982-83 season, where he stayed for 18 months and scored one goal in 11 league appearances. McGlashan signed for Dunfermline Athletic midway through the 1983-84 season, where he stayed for 6 months and scored one goal in 16 league appearances.

McGlashan signed for Cowdenbeath at the start of the 1984-85 season, where he stayed for 2 years and scored 27 goals in 60 league appearances. He signed for Clyde at the start of the 1986-87 season, where he stayed for 4 years and scored 48 goals in 140 league appearances.

McGlashan signed for Clyde's fiercest rivals Partick Thistle at the start of the 1990-91 season, where he stayed for 3 years and scored 30 goals in 103 league appearances. While at Thistle, McGlashan was the subject of a famous quote from manager John Lambie; on being informed during a match that McGlashan was concussed and didn't know who he was, Lambie said, "tell him he's Pelé and get him back on".

McGlashan signed for Ayr United at the start of the 1993-94 season, where he stayed for 1 year and scored 3 goals in 36 league appearances. He signed for Montrose at the start of the 1994-95 season, where he stayed for 4 years and scored 67 goals in 141 league appearances. McGlashan signed for Montrose's arch rivals Arbroath at the start of the 1998-99 season, where he stayed for 3 years and scored 33 goals in 88 league appearances.

McGlashan's final professional club was Elgin City, whom he signed for at the start of the 2001-02 season, where he stayed for 3 years and did not score any league goals in the 14 league matches that he played in. McGlashan retired at the end of the 2003-04 season at the age of 40.

== See also ==
- List of footballers in Scotland by number of league appearances (500+)
- List of footballers in Scotland by number of league goals (200+)
