= Billy Pirie =

Scottish footballer (1949–2025)

Personal information
- Full name: William Pirie
- Date of birth: 2 April 1949
- Place of birth: Aberdeen, Scotland
- Date of death: February 2025 (aged 75)
- Position: Forward

Senior career*
| Years | Team | Apps | (Gls) |
| –1971 | Arcadia Shepherds | | |
| 1971 | Huntly | | |
| 1971–1974 | Arbroath | 68 | (33) |
| 1974–1976 | Aberdeen | 38 | (11) |
| 1976 | New York Apollo | | |
| 1976–1980 | Dundee | 112 | (93) |
| 1980–? | APIA Leichhardt | | |
- Sydney Olympic
- * Club domestic league appearances and goals

William Pirie (2 April 1949 – February 2025) was a Scottish footballer who played as a forward.

== Career ==
Pirie commenced his senior Scottish football career with Huntly FC of the Highland Football League before transferring to his home town Scottish First Division League Club, Aberdeen FC. However, Pirie is best known for his time with Dundee from 1976 to 1980, where he made 112 league appearances (138 total), scoring 93 goals in the process (106 total), with 44 goals in his first season with the club remains a club record and secured for him the 1977 Player of the Year award.

Prior to his stint with Dundee, Pirie had spells with South African side Arcadia Shepherds, Scottish sides Huntly, Arbroath and Aberdeen, and moved to Australia after to play with APIA Leichhardt and Sydney Olympic. Pirie became a member of Dundee's Hall of Fame in 2016, and received the Legends Award.

== Death ==
On 3 February 2025, it was announced that Pirie had died on the weekend at the age of 75.

== Honours ==
Dundee

- Scottish First Division: 1978–79
