= Dave MacKinnon =

Scottish footballer

Personal information
- Full name: David Donaldson MacKinnon
- Date of birth: 23 May 1956 (age 70)
- Place of birth: Glasgow, Scotland
- Position: Defender

Senior career*
Years	Team	Apps	(Gls)
1972–1976	Arsenal	0	(0)
1976–1978	Dundee	30	(3)
1978–1982	Partick Thistle	99	(0)
1982–1986	Rangers	168	(2)
1986–1989	Airdrieonians	98	(3)
1989–1991	Kilmarnock	54	(2)
1991–1992	Forfar Athletic	28	(0)
Total		411	(9)

International career
1980	Scottish League XI	1	(0)
- * Club domestic league appearances and goals

David Donaldson MacKinnon (born 23 May 1956) is a Scottish former professional footballer, who played for Dundee, Partick Thistle, Rangers, Airdrieonians, Kilmarnock and Forfar Athletic.

== Football career ==
MacKinnon started his career at Arsenal, although his first-team appearances were confined to testimonial and friendly matches. He returned to Scotland to sign for Dundee at the start of the 1976–77 season, where he played for two seasons. MacKinnon then signed for Partick Thistle for £18,000 at the start of the 1978–79 season. Whilst at Firhill, he earned a Scottish League XI cap versus Northern Ireland in 1980 under Jock Stein. Soon after this, he was diagnosed with tuberculosis and needed a kidney removed; he recovered to full fitness and returned to the Thistle team in January 1981 for a 1980–81 Scottish Cup match versus Clyde.

MacKinnon signed for Rangers for £30,000 in May 1982. He made his Rangers debut on 4 September 1982, at the age of 26, with the match versus Motherwell ending in a 2–2 draw. Rangers – Player by Player, a book written by Bob Ferrier and Robert McElroy described MacKinnon: "Dave was a wholehearted full-back who had pace and was addicted to storming forward to use a powerful shot." MacKinnon departed Ibrox after the arrival of Graeme Souness, moving onto Airdrieonians for the start of the 1986–87 season. He then signed for Kilmarnock at the start of the 1989-90 season and scored the penalty kick versus Cowdenbeath on the final day of that season, to gain promotion from Division Two for the East Ayrshire club.

== Post-playing career ==
After retirement, MacKinnon was appointed general manager at Kilmarnock FC and was then chief executive at Dundee. He was also a reporter for Sportsound on BBC Radio Scotland during the late 1990s. In 2014, MacKinnon became Media and Communications Director at Hamilton Academical before joining Greenock Morton FC as CEO in May 2019.
