= Ian MacDonald (footballer) =

Scottish footballer

Personal information
- Full name: Ian Campbell Aitken MacDonald
- Date of birth: 30 August 1953 (age 73)
- Place of birth: Rinteln, West Germany (Note: Barry Hugman's Footballers and Rothmans Football Yearbook: 1981–82 both record MacDonald's place of birth as Rinteln, though it is recorded as Elgin by Post War English & Scottish Football League A–Z Player's Database.)
- Height: 6 ft 1 in (1.85 m)
- Position: Central defender

Youth career
- Elgin City

Senior career*
Years	Team	Apps	(Gls)
1972–1976	St Johnstone	108	(2)
1976–1981	Carlisle United	187	(7)
1981–1984	Dundee	70	(3)
1984–1986	Arbroath	26	(1)
Total		391	(13)

International career
1974	Scotland U23	2	(0)
- * Club domestic league appearances and goals

Ian Campbell Aitken MacDonald (born 30 August 1953) is a former professional footballer who played as a central defender, making over 300 career appearances.

== Career ==
Born in Rinteln, West Germany, MacDonald played for Elgin City, St Johnstone, Carlisle United, Dundee and Arbroath.
