= Stewart MacLaren =

Scottish footballer

Stuart MacLaren
Personal information
- Date of birth: 6 April 1953 (age 73)
- Place of birth: Larkhall, Scotland
- Height: 1.78 m (5 ft 10 in)
- Position: Right back

Senior career*
| Years | Team | Apps | (Gls) |
| 1969–1974 | West Bromwich Albion | 0 | (0) |
| 1974–1979 | Motherwell | 123 | (5) |
| 1978–1981 | Dundee | 80 | (7) |
| 1981–1985 | Heart of Midlothian | 67 | (0) |
| Total | | 270 | (12) |
- * Club domestic league appearances and goals

Stewart MacLaren (born 6 April 1953) is a Scottish former footballer who played in central defence. MacLaren played for Motherwell, Dundee and Heart of Midlothian. He was known by the nicknames Chopper and Gonzo. After retiring in 1985 through injury he pursued a career in the motor trade.
