= 1986–87 Scottish Second Division =

Scottish Second Division
- Season: 1986–87
- Champions: Meadowbank Thistle
- Promoted: Meadowbank Thistle; Raith Rovers

The 1986–87 Scottish Second Division was won by Meadowbank Thistle who, along with second placed Raith Rovers, were promoted to the First Division. Berwick Rangers finished bottom.

== Table ==
Pos	Team	Pld	W	D	L	GF	GA	GD	Pts	Promotion
1	Meadowbank Thistle (C, P)	39	23	9	7	69	38	+31	55	Promotion to the First Division
2	Raith Rovers (P)	39	16	20	3	73	44	+29	52	Promotion to the First Division
3	Stirling Albion	39	20	12	7	55	33	+22	52	
4	Ayr United	39	22	8	9	70	49	+21	52	
5	St Johnstone	39	16	13	10	59	49	+10	45	
6	Alloa Athletic	39	17	7	15	48	50	−2	41	
7	Cowdenbeath	39	16	8	15	59	55	+4	40	
8	Albion Rovers	39	15	9	15	48	51	−3	39	
9	Queen's Park	39	9	19	11	48	49	−1	37	
10	Stranraer	39	9	11	19	41	59	−18	29	
11	Arbroath	39	11	7	21	46	66	−20	29	
12	Stenhousemuir	39	10	9	20	37	58	−21	29	
13	East Stirlingshire	39	6	11	22	33	56	−23	23	
14	Berwick Rangers	39	8	7	24	40	69	−29	23	

Source: "1986-1987 Second Division - SPFL Archive". SPFL.
Rules for classification: 1) points; 2) goal difference; 3) number of goals scored.
(C) Champions; (P) Promoted

Promoted: Meadowbank Thistle, Raith Rovers
