= Jim Shirra =

Scottish footballer

Personal information
- Date of birth: 10 June 1950 (age 76)
- Place of birth: Falkirk, Scotland
- Position: Midfielder

Youth career
- Gairdoch United

Senior career*
Years	Team	Apps	(Gls)
1967–1976	Falkirk	185	(27)
1976–1978	Aberdeen	34	(0)
1978–1981	Dundee	106	(14)
1981–1982	South Melbourne	47	(1)
1983–1984	Stirling Albion	29	(0)
Total		301	(42)
- * Club domestic league appearances and goals

Jim Shirra (born 10 June 1950) is a Scottish professional footballer who spent the majority of his career playing for Falkirk, where he made over 180 league appearances and scored 27 goals. He also played for Aberdeen and Dundee before leaving for Melbourne, Australia where he played in the National Soccer League for South Melbourne Hellas, one of Australia's most successful clubs. Shirra later returned to Scotland where he played for Stirling Albion in the second division of the Scottish Football League
