= Brian Scrimgeour =

Scottish footballer

Personal information
- Full name: Brian Scrimgeour
- Date of birth: 11 August 1959 (age 67)
- Place of birth: Dundee, Scotland
- Height: 6 ft 0 in (1.83 m)
- Position: Defender

Senior career*
Years	Team	Apps	(Gls)
	Dundee Violet	?	(?)
1978?–1983?	Dundee	58	(7)
1983?–1986?	Chesterfield	121	(15)
1986?–1987?	Falkirk	9	(1)
1987?–1988?	Partick Thistle	21	(1)
Total		209	(24)
- * Club domestic league appearances and goals

Brian Scrimgeour (born 11 August 1959) is a Scottish former professional footballer, who played in The Football League as a defender.

== Honours ==
Chesterfield

- Football League Fourth Division: 1984–85
