= Les Barr =

Scottish footballer

Personal information
- Full name: Les Barr
- Date of birth: 18 November 1952
- Place of birth: Dundee, Scotland
- Positions: Right-back; right winger

Youth career
- Stobswell Juniors

Senior career*
Years	Team	Apps	(Gls)
1973–1978	Montrose	214	(43)
1978–1982	Dundee	103	(1)
1982–1989	Montrose	213	(18)
Total		530	(62)
- * Club domestic league appearances and goals

Les Barr (born 18 November 1952) is a Scottish former footballer, who played for Montrose and Dundee in the Scottish Football League.

== Honours ==
Dundee

- Scottish League Cup runner up: 1980

Montrose

- Scottish League Division Two: 1984–85
