= Albert Kidd =

Scottish footballer

Personal information
- Date of birth: 16 October 1957 (age 69)
- Place of birth: Dundee, Scotland
- Position: Striker

Youth career
- Carnoustie Panmure

Senior career*
Years	Team	Apps	(Gls)
1976–1977	Brechin City	18	(0)
1977–1979	Arbroath	95	(19)
1979–1981	Motherwell	53	(18)
1981–1986	Dundee	115	(12)
1986–1987	Falkirk	15	(0)
1987–1993	West Adelaide SC	85	(0)
Total		296	(49)
- * Club domestic league appearances and goals

Albert Kidd (born 16 October 1957) is a Scottish former football player who now lives in Australia. He is best known in Scottish football for scoring two goals for Dundee against Hearts on the final day of the 1985–86 season to deny Hearts the championship.

== Career ==
=== Early career ===
Kidd began his senior career in 1976 at Scottish Second Division side Brechin City where he made 18 league appearances without scoring. A year later he moved up a division and joined Arbroath where he played for over two years. During that time Kidd scored 19 goals in 95 league appearances. In 1979, Kidd moved to Motherwell where he maintained a decent scoring rate of 18 goals in 53 league appearances. Motherwell failed to win promotion in either of Kidd's two seasons there.

=== Dundee ===
In the summer of 1981, Kidd moved to Dundee, who had just gained promotion to the Scottish Premier Division. Prior to the day of what transpired to be his final game for Dundee, Kidd had made 114 league appearances for Dundee, scoring a modest 10 times. He had made only 11 appearances that season, seven of which were as a substitute.

==== 3 May 1986 ====
Going into the final day of the 1985–86 season, Hearts were in a very strong position. They were two points clear of second-placed Celtic and had a goal difference that was four goals better. With only two points available for a win in Scottish football at this time (three points for a win was not introduced until 1994), Hearts only needed to avoid defeat in the match at Dens Park to win the championship. Hearts had not lost any match since 28 September 1985. It was also possible that Hearts could win the championship even if they lost the match, so long as Celtic did not overturn the goal difference advantage by winning heavily against St Mirren at Love Street.

Dundee had all to play for themselves. Dundee and Rangers were vying for fifth place in the league; with the team finishing fifth gaining the last 'European' spot and entry into the following season's UEFA Cup. Rangers were ahead of Dundee in the league going into the final fixture of the season, but a win for Dundee and defeat for Rangers would see the Dens Park side leap-frog Rangers in the league and qualify for Europe.

At half-time, with the scoreline at Dens Park still 0–0, it was announced over the public address system that Celtic were winning 4–0. Although Hearts were on course to win the point they needed to win the championship, the score at Love Street meant that Hearts had lost their goal difference advantage over Celtic. Hearts knew that they would have to avoid defeat in their match to win the championship.

Midway through the second half, with the score at Dens Park still locked at 0–0, the Dundee manager Archie Knox brought on Kidd (a forward) as a substitute for left full-back Tosh McKinlay in an effort to win the game. Dundee needed to win the game to stand a chance of qualifying for the UEFA Cup. (Note: Despite winning the game against Hearts, Dundee did not qualify for the 1986–87 UEFA Cup because Rangers also won their game and took the last qualifying position.) In the 83rd minute, with Hearts less than 10 minutes away from winning their first championship since 1960, Kidd scored the opening goal with a close-range finish from a corner kick. Six minutes later, Kidd effectively ended Hearts' chances by scoring a second goal to make the final score a 2–0 win for Dundee. Remarkably, Kidd had not scored all season before scoring two goals in the last 10 minutes of the season. Celtic won their game 5–0 to win the championship on goal difference by three goals.

=== Later career ===
Kidd left Dundee to join Falkirk for the following season, 1986–87. In an ironic twist, Falkirk went to Celtic Park in the penultimate game of the season needing a result to ensure their top-flight status, while Celtic needed to win to retain an outside chance of winning the championship. Kidd came on as a substitute as Falkirk won 2–1, effectively ending Celtic's championship challenge. The winning goal was scored by Jimmy Gilmour. Kidd left Scottish football in 1987 to play for Australian NSL side West Adelaide SC.

== After football ==
Kidd has lived in Australia since emigrating there to play for West Adelaide SC. Despite living far from Scotland, he is still fondly remembered by Celtic fans and particularly by fans of Hibs, who are Hearts' rivals in Edinburgh. This is despite the fact that Kidd never played for either Celtic or Hibs. There are anecdotes that Hibs effectively stopped playing during their match against Dundee United on the same day, allowing United to score a winning goal in the meaningless match, due to the joyous reaction of the Hibs support to the news from Dens Park.

Kidd himself has told an anecdote that Billy Connolly (a Celtic fan) was star-struck when he accidentally met Kidd in an Adelaide hotel. As Connolly is famous around the English-speaking world, Kidd instantly recognised him, but Connolly didn't initially recognise Kidd. As the pair went through some good-natured small talk, Connolly eventually realised who he was talking to.
