= Andy Geddes (footballer, born 1959) =

Scottish footballer (1959–2022)

Personal information
- Date of birth: 27 October 1959
- Place of birth: Paisley, Scotland
- Date of death: 22 March 2022 (aged 62)

Senior career*
Years	Team	Apps	(Gls)
1978–1980	Leicester City	0	(0)
1980–1984	Dundee	29	(9)
- Wits University
- Kaizer Chiefs
- * Club domestic league appearances and goals

Andy Geddes (27 October 1959 – 22 March 2022) was a Scottish footballer who played for Dundee in the Scottish Football League and Wits University in South Africa. He was born in Paisley.

Geddes died of cancer on 16 March 2022.
