= Cammy Fraser =

Scottish footballer

Personal information
- Full name: Campbell Fraser
- Date of birth: 22 July 1957 (age 69)
- Place of birth: Dundee, Scotland
- Position: Midfielder

Senior career*
Years	Team	Apps	(Gls)
1974–1980	Heart of Midlothian	152	(18)
1980–1984	Dundee	158	(19)
1984–1987	Rangers	75	(9)
1987–1991	Raith Rovers	83	(6)
1991–1992	Dundee	22	(0)
1992–1993	Montrose	26	(5)
Total		516	(54)

Managerial career
- 1993–: Lochore Welfare
- Newburgh
- * Club domestic league appearances and goals

Cammy Fraser (born 22 July 1957, in Dundee) is a Scottish former footballer who played as a midfielder. Fraser won league titles and cups with three Scottish clubs, collecting three trophies with Rangers and one each with Heart of Midlothian and Dundee. Fraser also played with Raith Rovers and Montrose in his career. Fraser left the senior game in 1993 to become player/manager at Lochore Welfare. Although Fraser never held a senior coaching position, he applied to become manager of former club Raith in October 2004. Fraser also managed Newburgh.

== Personal life ==
Fraser has two children, and three granddaughters, Madison, Lois and phoebe one of whom followed in his footsteps and played football.

== Honours ==
Heart of Midlothian

- Scottish First Division: 1979–80

Dundee

- Scottish League Cup runner-up: 1980–81
- Scottish First Division: 1991–92

Rangers

- Scottish Premier Division: 1986–87
- Scottish League Cup: 1984–85, 1986–87
