= Ray Stephen =

Scottish footballer

Personal information
- Date of birth: 9 December 1962 (age 63)
- Place of birth: Aberdeen, Scotland
- Height: 1.80 m (5 ft 11 in)
- Position: Striker

Senior career*
Years	Team	Apps	(Gls)
1980–1987	Dundee	181	(47)
1987–1991	Nancy		
1991–1992	Kilmarnock	1	(0)
- Cove Rangers
Total		182+	(47+)

International career
1982	Scotland U21	1	(0)
- * Club domestic league appearances and goals

Ray Stephen (born 9 December 1962) is a Scottish former professional footballer who played as a striker.

== Career ==
Born in Aberdeen, Stephen played in Scotland and France for Dundee, Nancy, Kilmarnock and Cove Rangers. He was signed for Nancy by Arsène Wenger.
