= Jim Murphy (footballer, born 1956) =

Scottish footballer

Personal information
- Date of birth: 14 October 1956 (age 70)
- Place of birth: Hamilton, Scotland
- Position: Left winger

Youth career
- Celtic Boys Club
- 1973–1975: Celtic

Senior career*
Years	Team	Apps	(Gls)
1975–1976	Queen of the South	3	(0)
1976–1978	Bellshill Athletic		
1978–1983	Dundee	99	(12)
1983	→ Hamilton Academical (loan)	6	(1)
1983–1986	Ayr United	103	(18)
1986–1988	Clyde	48	(12)
Total		259	(43)
- * Club domestic league appearances and goals

Jim Murphy (born 14 October 1956) is a Scottish professional footballer, who played in the Scottish Football League for Queen of the South, Dundee, Hamilton Academical, Ayr United and Clyde.
