= Don Mackay =

Scottish footballer and manager

Personal information
- Full name: Donald Scrimgeour Mackay
- Date of birth: 19 March 1940 (age 86)
- Place of birth: Glasgow, Scotland
- Position: Goalkeeper

Senior career*
Years	Team	Apps	(Gls)
1958–1962	Forfar Athletic	104	(0)
1962–1972	Dundee United	243	(0)
1967	→ Dallas Tornado (loan)	7	(0)
1972–1974	Southend United	13	(0)

Managerial career
- 1978–1980: Nørresundby
- 1980–1984: Dundee
- 1984–1986: Coventry City
- 1987–1991: Blackburn Rovers
- 1991–1994: Fulham
- 2001: Airdrieonians
- * Club domestic league appearances and goals

Donald Scrimgeour Mackay (born 19 March 1940) is a Scottish former professional football player and manager.

== Managerial career ==
After a spell coaching the Bristol City youth team between 1974 and 1978, where he was part of the backroom staff that won promotion to the then English First Division, he began his management career in Denmark with Nørresundby managing the local side Norresundby, gaining promotion in his first season there. He returned to Scotland in 1980 when he was appointed manager of Dundee, winning promotion to the Scottish Premier Division with the club, again in his first season in charge. After several high-profile departures from the Dundee first team, Mackay eventually left the club in 1983.

After a short time away from the game, Bobby Gould approached him to be his assistant at Coventry City. Gould was sacked after a poor run of results and Mackay was asked to take charge, where the club staved off relegation by famously winning their last three games of the season, to retain their First Division status.

In April 1986, with Coventry facing their third successive relegation battle, and having gone eight games without a win, Mackay left the club. He then went to work as reserve-team coach at Rangers, alongside ex playing colleague Walter Smith and the manager Graeme Souness. Despite a successful spell at Rangers, Mackay wanted to manage in his own right, and therefore moved onto Blackburn Rovers. They narrowly missed the play-offs in his first season in charge, but did win the Full Members Cup, beating First Division Chelsea, Oxford United and Charlton Athletic along the way.

In the next two seasons at Blackburn they made the playoffs, losing out on promotion both times. Following a relatively poor final season in charge (1990–91), he was relieved of his position early in the next season and went on to manage Fulham. His first season at Fulham was promising but results deteriorated the following year and following a defeat at Leyton Orient he was dismissed, results did not improve and Fulham were eventually relegated to the Third Division.

Mackay then worked as a scout for Arsenal, where he discovered the young Freddie Ljungberg. Mackay then had a stint as chief scout of St Johnstone. He then teamed up with Steve Archibald at Airdrie. Despite the financial difficulties experienced by the club, they won the Scottish Challenge Cup in their only season in charge.

He was employed by Middlesbrough as a scout from December 2001 through to June 2007, before moving to join Leicester City under Martin Allen. His role as sporting director was short-lived, however.

== Playing career ==
He was a goalkeeper and played for Forfar Athletic and made 104 appearances. He was then signed for Dundee United by Jerry Kerr, for whom he made 243 appearances. This is still the second highest number of appearances made by a goalkeeper for Dundee United, behind Hamish McAlpine. Mackay was then given a free transfer by Jim McLean, after ten years with Dundee United. Mackay finished his 16-year professional playing career with Southend United after 13 appearances.

== Career statistics ==
=== Manager ===
Team	Nat	From	To	Record				
Team	Nat	From	To	G	W	D	L	Win %
Nørresundby	DEN	1978	1980	—	−	−	−	—
Dundee	SCO	15 April 1980	31 May 1984	188	71	38	79	37.77
Coventry City	ENG	28 December 1984	13 April 1986	67	22	12	33	32.84
Blackburn Rovers	ENG	3 February 1987	2 September 1991	232	91	64	77	39.22
Fulham	ENG	27 January 1992	28 March 1994	161	53	46	62	32.92
Airdrieonians	SCO	20 July 2000	13 February 2001	38	12	17	9	31.58
Total				38	12	17	9	31.58

== Honours ==
Blackburn Rovers

- Full Members' Cup: 1986–87
