= Bobby Geddes =

Scottish footballer

Personal information
- Full name: Robert Geddes
- Date of birth: 12 August 1960 (age 66)
- Place of birth: Inverness, Scotland
- Height: 6 ft 0 in (1.83 m)
- Position: Goalkeeper

Team information
- Current team: Falkirk (goalkeeping coach)

Youth career
- 1976–1977: Ross County
- 1977–1979: Dundee

Senior career*
Years	Team	Apps	(Gls)
1979–1990	Dundee	253	(0)
1990–1996	Kilmarnock	183	(0)
1996–1997	Raith Rovers	12	(0)
1997–1999	Linfield		
1999–2000	Brechin City	36	(0)
- Carnoustie Panmure
2008–2010	Dundee	1	(0)
Total		485	(0)

International career
1981–1988	Scotland U21	5	(0)

Managerial career
- Carnoustie Panmure
- * Club domestic league appearances and goals

Robert Geddes (born 12 August 1960) is a Scotland former footballer who played as a goalkeeper, and is currently the goalkeeping coach for Falkirk. A product of the Highland Football League, Geddes was goalkeeping coach at first club Dundee from 2006 until 2021, a position he previously held at city rivals Dundee United.

== Playing career ==
Inverness-born Geddes began his professional career with Ross County, then a Highland League club. In 1977 Geddes transferred from Ross County to Dundee, and was part of the side who finished runners-up in the First Division and League Cup that season. In 1990 after ten years at Dens Park, Geddes moved west to Kilmarnock where in 1993 he was part of the promotion-winning side. A short spell with Raith Rovers followed in the mid-90s before spending two years in Northern Ireland with Linfield where he won the Irish League Cup in successive seasons. At the end of the decade, Geddes returned to Scotland with Brechin City, marking his twentieth and final season in professional football.

== Coaching career ==
Geddes moved into management with junior side Carnoustie Panmure, adopting a player/manager role which brought the club the Scottish Junior Cup in 2003–04. In April 2005, Geddes moved into a goalkeeping coaching role with Dundee United, where he stayed before returning to Dundee in the same role. In April 2008, injuries forced 47-year-old Geddes to appear as the substitute goalkeeper in a match against Hamilton Academical. Coincidentally, the New Douglas Park club were also forced to name their goalkeeping coach Brian Potter as their substitute goalkeeper. Potter was a used substitute in the 1–1 draw, whilst Geddes, listed as a trialist, was an unused substitute.

Geddes again had to be re-registered in August 2009, to appear as a substitute goalkeeper for Dundee in their Co-operative Insurance Cup match against Forfar Athletic on 25 August 2009.

On 21 April 2010, Geddes appeared as a substitute goalkeeper for Dundee against Raith Rovers, after Tony Bullock went off with a hamstring injury after 27 minutes, which Dundee lost 1–0. Geddes became the oldest player to appear for Dundee in a league match, at 49 years old. He left his coaching role with Dundee in July 2021, after fifteen years. Later that month, Geddes would be announced as the goalkeeping coach for Scottish League One side Falkirk.

== Honours ==
Dundee

- Scottish League Cup Runner-up: 1

1980–81

Linfield

- Irish League Cup: 2

1997-98, 1998-99

Carnoustie

- Scottish Junior Cup: 1

2003–04
