= Erich Schaedler =

Scottish footballer

Personal information
- Full name: Erich Peter Schaedler
- Date of birth: 6 August 1949
- Place of birth: Biggar, South Lanarkshire, Scotland
- Date of death: 24 December 1985 (aged 36)
- Place of death: Cardrona Forest, Scottish Borders, Scotland
- Position: Left back

Senior career*
Years	Team	Apps	(Gls)
1968–1969	Stirling Albion	19	(1)
1969–1977	Hibernian	212	(2)
1977–1981	Dundee	103	(1)
1981–1985	Hibernian	87	(0)
1985	Dumbarton	14	(0)
Total		435	(4)

International career
1974	Scotland	1	(0)
- * Club domestic league appearances and goals

Erich Peter Schaedler (6 August 1949 – 24 December 1985), nicknamed "Shades", was a Scottish professional footballer who played as a left back. Schaedler was the son of a German POW.

Born in Biggar, South Lanarkshire, Schaedler started his career at Stirling Albion in 1969 before moving to Hibernian later that year. It was at Easter Road that he would enjoy his greatest success, forming part of the "Turnbull's Tornadoes" side that won the Drybrough Cup then League Cup in 1972–73, and the Drybrough Cup in 1973–74. This side also finished second in the Scottish League in consecutive seasons.

Schaedler was awarded his only Scotland cap during this period, against West Germany. He was selected in the squad for the 1974 FIFA World Cup but did not play in the tournament.

Schaedler moved to Dundee in 1977, where he won a First Division championship in 1978–79. He returned to Hibs in 1981, playing for four seasons before moving to Dumbarton. By 1984, he was running a public house, Shades, on Easter Road, Edinburgh, receiving a bravery award from Lothian and Borders Police in December 1984 when he and two police constables (who also received awards) confronted a man carrying a loaded shotgun at the pub. Schaedler was still playing senior football when he committed suicide at the age of 36 on Christmas Eve 1985 in the Cardrona Forest.

== Sources ==
- Shades: The Short Life And Tragic Death of Erich Schaedler by Colin Leslie; Black and White Publishing, October 2013. ISBN 9781845025410
