= Bobby Glennie =

Scottish footballer and manager

Personal information
- Full name: Robert Glennie
- Date of birth: 2 October 1957 (age 69)
- Place of birth: Dundee, Scotland
- Position: Defender

Senior career*
Years	Team	Apps	(Gls)
1977–1978	Aberdeen	3	(0)
1978–1988	Dundee	309	(6)
1988–1989	Raith Rovers	23	(0)
1989–1990	Forfar Athletic	19	(1)
1990–1994	Arbroath	13	(0)
Total		367	(7)

Managerial career
- 1989–1990: Forfar Athletic
- * Club domestic league appearances and goals

Robert "Bobby" Glennie (born 2 October 1957) is a Scottish former footballer, who played for Aberdeen, Dundee, Raith Rovers, Forfar Athletic, Arbroath and Elgin City. He made over 300 league appearances for Dundee and played in the 1980 Scottish League Cup Final defeat by Dundee derby rivals Dundee United.

Glennie was appointed as player-manager of Forfar in 1989. Despite successfully avoiding relegation, he was dismissed by the club in July 1990 as they had decided to bring in Paul Hegarty as their first ever full-time manager.

== Personal life ==
On Friday 17 June 2011, Glennie was arrested after being caught two and a half times the drink drive limit. Police, who had been tipped off anonymously that Glennie may drive, pulled him over yards away from the pub in Dundee's Kinghorne Road. After spending the whole weekend in custody, he was fined £600 and banned for 20 months. Glennie's current occupation was given in court as a fork lift truck driver.
