= Peter Mackie (footballer) =

Scottish footballer

Personal information
- Date of birth: 17 January 1958 (age 68)
- Place of birth: Glasgow, Scotland
- Position: Midfielder

Senior career*
Years	Team	Apps	(Gls)
1977–1979	Celtic	3	(0)
1979–1984	Dundee	151	(19)
1984–1986	St Mirren	45	(4)
1986–1987	Partick Thistle	34	(3)
1987	Stranraer	1	(0)
1987–1988	Ottawa Intrepid	33	(0)
1990–1991	Kitchener Spirit/Kickers	46	(2)
- * Club domestic league appearances and goals

Peter Mackie (born 17 January 1958) is a Scottish former footballer noted as a promising prospect at Parkhead. He's now a technical director for RED Academy in canada

== Career ==
He began his career at Celtic making 5 appearances in two years. He moved on to Dundee where he established himself of some note fulfilling some that early promise, scoring 19 goals in 151 appearances. Later in his career, he played for St Mirren, where he scored 4 goals in 45 appearances. In 1986, he joined Partick Thistle, scoring three goals in 34 appearances . He finished his time in Scotland, playing once as a trialist with Stranraer.

After his time his Scotland, he began playing in the Canadian Soccer League. In 1987, he joined the National Capital Pioneers (who were renamed as Ottawa Intrepid in 1988), where he spent two seasons. In 1990, he joined Kitchener Spirit (who were renamed Kitchener Kickers in 1991), spending two seasons there as well.
