= George McGeachie (footballer, born 1959) =

Scottish footballer

Personal information
- Full name: George McGeachie
- Date of birth: 5 February 1959 (age 67)
- Place of birth: Falkirk, Scotland
- Position: Defender

Senior career*
Years	Team	Apps	(Gls)
1977–1990	Dundee	239	(10)
1990–1994	Raith Rovers	113	(0)
1994–1997	Stenhousemuir	69	(0)
Total		421	(10)
- * Club domestic league appearances and goals

George McGeachie (born 5 February 1959 in Falkirk) is a Scottish former footballer who played as a defender. McGeachie spent the majority of his career with Dundee, playing for thirteen seasons at Dens Park and making nearly 250 league appearances, including winning the 1978–79 Scottish First Division. In 1990, McGeachie moved down the east coast to play for Raith Rovers, spending four years with the Kirkcaldy club and winning the First Division again in 1992–93. A three-year spell with Stenhousemuir – including winning the Scottish Challenge Cup in 1995–96 – was McGeachie's final period in senior football before retiring in 1997.

== Honours ==
=== Dundee ===
- Scottish First Division: 1

1978–79

- Scottish League Cup Runner-up: 1

1980–81

=== Raith Rovers ===
- Scottish First Division: 1

1992–93

=== Stenhousemuir ===
- Scottish Challenge Cup: 1

1995–96
