= Eric Sinclair (footballer) =

Scottish footballer

Personal information
- Full name: Duncan Eric Sinclair
- Date of birth: 13 January 1954 (age 72)
- Place of birth: Haggs, Scotland
- Position: Striker

Team information
- Current team: Kilsyth Rangers (manager)

Senior career*
Years	Team	Apps	(Gls)
- Kilsyth Rangers
1974–1984	Dundee	238	(76)
1983–1984	St Mirren	3	(0)
1983–1984	Airdrieonians	16	(1)
- Linlithgow Rose
Total		257	(77)

International career
1980	Scottish Football League XI	1	(1)

Managerial career
- Linlithgow Rose
- Camelon Juniors
- Armadale Thistle
- 2006–2009: Bo'ness United
- 2010–: Kilsyth Rangers
- * Club domestic league appearances and goals as of 15 March 2012

Duncan Eric Sinclair (born 13 January 1954 in Haggs) is a Scottish former footballer, who played for Dundee, St Mirren and Airdrie in the Scottish Football League. Sinclair represented the Scottish League once, in 1980.

Sinclair finished his playing career in Junior football and is currently the manager of Kilsyth Rangers.
