= 1974–75 Dumbarton F.C. season =

Dumbarton
1974–1975 season
- Manager: Alex Wright
- Stadium: Boghead Park, Dumbarton
- Scottish League Division 1: 14th
- Scottish Cup: Fifth round
- Scottish League Cup: Prelims
- Top goalscorer: League: Willie Wallace (12); All: Tom McAdam (20)
- Highest home attendance: 16000
- Lowest home attendance: 2000
- Average home league attendance: 4235

The 1974–75 season was the 91st football season in which Dumbarton competed at a Scottish national level, entering the Scottish Football League, the Scottish Cup and the Scottish League Cup. In addition Dumbarton played in the Stirlingshire Cup.

== Story of the Season ==
=== Players ===
After the success of the previous season, Dumbarton knew that a repeat of a 10th-place finish would guarantee them a place in next season's 10 team Premier Division.

A number of signings were made during the close season including Willie Menmuir from Hearts, Ally Brown from Vale of Leven and a young Murdo MacLeod from Glasgow Amateurs.

Amongst those leaving were Brian Heron to Oxford United and John Taylor and Willie Borland to Stranraer.

=== August ===
At the beginning of the season, Dumbarton toured Spain and played two games - against Sitges UE and San Martin CF. The first nearly didn't take place – as apparently the Sitges players had become aware of the 'roughness' of Scottish football teams. Nevertheless, after negotiations conducted through John Cushley, the team captain (and fluent Spanish speaker) the game went ahead when Dumbarton agreed to wear trainers instead of the standard football boots. Stiges appeared in their boots, and proceeded for most of the game to 'boot' the Dumbarton players all over the pitch. Leading 3–1, with 10 minutes to go, Dumbarton scored a fourth goal. Displeased with the goal not being ruled out for offside, the Sitges players walked off – and so ended this 'friendly' match.

The season ‘proper’ commenced with the League Cup sectional qualifiers with Clyde on 10 August. Due to Boghead being reseeded Dumbarton's temporary home was New Kilbowie Park, Clydebank. The team had a familiar look – Williams; Mulllen, Watt, Ruddy and Colin McAdam; Graham, Coleman and Willie Wallace; Bourke, Tom McAdam and Ian Wallace with substitutes Checkley and Mathie on the bench. An early Tom McAdam goal had the Sons in front but goals either side of half time put Clyde ahead. A Willie Wallace penalty levelled matters but Clyde had the last word with a winner five minutes from time.

On 14 August Dumbarton travelled to Arbroath for their second League Cup qualifier. In a see-saw match the Sons once again opened quickly with Bourke scoring in six minutes. The home side turned the game around with two goals to go ahead before Willie Wallace and then Tom McAdam put Dumbarton ahead once again. However Arbroath snatched an equaliser with ten minutes left and the Sons had to make do with a point in a 3–3 draw.

Next up was Partick Thistle at Firhill on 16 August. While the Jags were ahead early, Tom McAdam notched the equaliser just on half time. Then with ten minutes left Bourke struck the winner for a 2–1 victory.

On 21 August Dumbarton played the return fixture against Arbroath at Clydebank. Dumbarton dominated the game for long periods, despite the loss of Colin McAdam to injury after just 15 minutes, but a goal could not be found and it was two late strikes from Arbroath which brought about a disappointing 2–0 loss.

Any chance of qualification to the next round of the League Cup depended on finding a result against Partick Thistle. For the first time this season the team turned out at Boghead, and it was a successful return as goals from Bourke and Tom McAdam together with an own goal provided a deserved 3–1 win.

The final game of the section took place at Shawfield against Clyde on 28 August. Tom McAdam had Dumbarton ahead at halftime but a Clyde goal with 16 minutes left was enough to scupper both sides chances as Partick Thistle would advance to the knock out stages.

The new league season commenced on 31 August – against Clyde at Boghead. New £15,000 signing Jumbo Muir (ex Motherwell) was given his first start in a Sons shirt. Once again it was Tom McAdam who got Dumbarton's first goal – his sixth in seven matches, and another from Willie Wallace before half time secured a 2–0 win.

=== September ===
On 7 September Dumbarton made the short trip to Greenock to play Morton in the league. The Sons fielded their latest signing Jim Cook (ex Kilmarnock). All the goal action was packed into the last half hour of the match with again Tom McAdam stepping up to equalise an earlier Morton goal for a 1–1 draw.

A week later Dumbarton entertained Dunfermline at Boghead in the league. A dominant Sons side had only a single goal to show for their efforts at half time – McAdam doing the business. However Dumbarton were to rue all the missed chances as Dunfermline got the equaliser with a 25-yard strike and for the second week in a row the points were shared in a 1–1 draw.

Dumbarton's biggest challenge to date was when the team visited Ibrox in the league to play Rangers on 21 September. The home side got off to a great start with three goals in the first 30 minutes. However the Sons settled and goals from McAdam and Cook either side of half time gave Dumbarton a chance. It was however Rangers who rallied and were well worth their 3–2 win.

On 28 September Gayfield was the venue for the league fixture against Arbroath. The Sons had struggled against Arbroath in the earlier League Cup ties but there was no mistake in this match as goals from McAdam (his 10th of the season) and Willie Wallace (2) gave Dumbarton a comfortable 3–0 win.

At the end of the month Dumbarton were holding a healthy 7th place in the league with 6 points from 5 matches. Rangers led Celtic by a single point at the top.

=== October ===
The next big test for Dumbarton occurred on 5 October with the visit of Celtic to Boghead on league duty. The Celts had just exited from the European Cup a few days earlier and were anxious to make some amends. Roy McCormack made his first appearance of the season in the Sons attack. It was Celtic however who were quickly off the mark with a goal in 3 minutes and were two ahead by halftime. A Willie Wallace penalty got Dumbarton back into the game but with eight minutes left Celtic made the points safe with a further goal for a 3–1 win.

The following weekend Dumbarton played Partick Thistle in the league at Firhill. The Sons had completed the double over the Jags earlier in the League Cup but a soft penalty put Partick Thistle ahead after 20 minutes. Tom McAdam had Dumbarton level early in the second half and just when it looked like the teams would share of the spoils, the home side struck with a late goal and consigned Dumbarton to a 2–1 defeat.

On 19 October Aberdeen made the long journey to Boghead to fulfil the league fixture. In atrocious conditions the Dons were ahead after 10 minutes only for Willie Wallace to equalise from a penalty shortly thereafter. Two quick goals after the break had Aberdeen back ahead before Cook got one back for the Sons. The close 3–2 defeat was all the more disappointing bearing in mind that the Sons also had two ‘goals’ disallowed for offside.

Dumbarton travelled to Tannadice to play Dundee United on 26 October. The team welcomed back Colin McAdam back from injury, and it was brother Tom scoring his 12th goal of the season who had the Sons ahead by the interval. Dundee United turned the game around after the break with two quick goals but with 9 minutes left in the game, Ruddy then Willie Wallace had Dumbarton ahead again. However the visitors were not finished as Andy Gray competed his hat trick and the game finished 3-3.

So at the end of October, Dumbarton had slipped to 9th place in the league with 7 points from 9 matches played. Rangers still at the top had now a two-point lead over Celtic and Aberdeen.

=== November ===
Without a win in four games Dumbarton were looking to change that in their league fixture against Airdrie at Boghead on 2 November. Ian McGregor was given the nod over Lawrie Williams in goal. The change earned a ‘clean sheet’ and up front it was a Willie Wallace double that earned the Sons a 2–0 win.

Dumbarton travelled to the capital a week later to play Hearts in the league at Tynecastle. This was Hearts first game under new manager John Hagart and his team were comfortably ahead 2-0 early in the second half. A Cook goal brought the Sons back into the game but they could not find an equaliser

On 16 November Ayr United arrived at Boghead in the league. It looked good for the home side as early as the tenth minute as Willie Wallace put the Sons ahead. However Ayr were soon level and another goal 12 minutes into the second half was enough to give Ayr a 2–1 win and both points.

Changes were made to the Dumbarton team for the visit of Dundee to Boghead on 23 November with in particular Ross Mathie being preferred to Tom McAdam. Dundee were the better in the first half but Dumbarton came more into it after the interval. In the end the game finished in a 0–0 draw.

On the final day of the month it was a trip to Perth to play the league fixture against St Johnstone. On the day it was a poor performance from the Sons with the home side taking both points in an easy 3–0 win.

With just 3 points from the last five games Dumbarton were struggling to keep hold of their Premiership goal, slipping to 13th place with 10 points from 14 games. The battle at the top was hotting up with Rangers and Celtic both on 24 points.

=== December ===
Dumbarton's game with Kilmarnock on 7 December was postponed due to an unplayable pitch so a week later the league match against Hibernian was played out at Easter Road. The Sons were outplayed for the mostpart and were it not for Hibs shyness in front of goal the 2–0 defeat could have been greater.

On 21 December Motherwell were welcomed to Boghead on league duty. With the pitch living up to its name both teams found it difficult to play anything other than long ball tactics. However it was the visitors who went away with both points with a single goal victory.

The following weekend the team travelled to Glasgow to play Clyde in the return league fixture. Bourke's return to the attack had the desired effect as his two goals had the Sons ahead at half time. Muir got another after an hour's play and while Clyde got one back the game finished in a welcome 3–1 win.

Unfortunately even with the win Dumbarton's hopes of making the top ten continued to wane as they slipped yet further to 17th place with 12 points from 17 games played. At the top Celtic were back out in front two points ahead of Rangers.

=== January ===
On New Year's Day the ‘derby’ match was staged at Boghead against Morton with a tame 0–0 draw being played out.

On 4 January the Sons travelled to Fife to play Dunfermline. Dumbarton held the Fifers till just before the interval when a penalty kick gave the home side the lead. Two further goals in the second half resulted in an easy 3–0 win.

The following week title challenging Rangers came to Boghead. A delayed kick off to allow the 16,000 crowd into the stadium was rewarded by a fine display from the visitors. Rangers were two ahead before Muir gave the Sons some hope just before the interval. However, with Tommy McLean completing his hat trick, Rangers strolled to a 5–1 victory.

Dumbarton's game against Arbroath was called off on 18 January due to a frost bound pitch as was the Scottish Cup tie arranged for a week later against Inverness Clachnacuddin. However the third round tie was rescheduled for 29 January. Tom McAdam had the Sons two ahead by the break but the incessant sleet and snow proved to be a great leveller with the Highlanders getting one back. In the end the home side hung on for a 2–1 win.

=== February ===
Following a postponement of the league match against Celtic on 2 February, the league match against Partick Thistle was played a week later at Boghead. The game was won by the Jags with a single goal but referee Bobby Davidson made two controversial decisions which were to sink Dumbarton's hopes. First he waved away claims for a penalty when Bourke was felled in the area and then he denied a Willie Wallace goal by giving a free kick to the opposition.

The postponed Celtic match was played on 11 February. Two goals up at half time had Celtic in the driving seat. However Bourke and then Tom McAdam had the Sons level midway through the second half. Despite Celtic trying to get back into the game Dumbarton held on comfortably for a point.

The following Saturday Dumbarton were at Douglas Park to play Hamilton in the fourth round of the Scottish Cup. A goal just before half time from Tom McAdam was sufficient to see the Sons through to the quarter-finals.

On 19 February Arbroath were the opposition in the return league fixture at Boghead. The visitors were, like Dumbarton, struggling in the league but they managed to take a 1–0 lead before half time. However, in the second half Colin McAdam showed his teammates the way to goal by scoring a hat trick. Willie Wallace and Graham added to the tally for a 5–1 win.

Dumbarton kept up the revival three days later as they travelled to Pittodrie to play Aberdeen. A goal down early on in the game, they fought back with a goal from Bourke to draw the game.

Then on 26 February a further point was taken from the away league fixture against Kilmarnock at Rugby Park. The home side took an early lead but Colin McAdam put the Sons on level terms with 15 minutes to go. Dumbarton had several chances to snatch both points but in the end had to make to with a 1–1 draw.

So five points from four games kept Dumbarton in the race for that Top Ten spot, though at this stage they held 16th place in the league with 18 points from 25 games. Rangers were now four points clear of Celtic at the top.

=== March ===
On 1 March the Sons attempted to keep the good run going in the league with a home fixture again st Dundee United. Willie Wallace got Dumbarton off to a great start but goals either side of half time gave the visitors the win and the points.

A week later Dumbarton played Celtic in the last eight of the Scottish Cup at Boghead. Celtic were ahead within 5 minutes but Tom McAdam equalised almost immediately. However it was Celtic that found the net for the winner after an hour to advance to the semi-finals.

Hearts were the visitors to Boghead in the league on 15 March. In a poor game the visitors took the points with the only goal of the game scored in the second half. A midweek league game was played against Airdrie at Broomfield on 18 March. A win was required to maintain any real hope of a place in next season's Premier Division and Willie Wallace gave these hopes a lift with a goal from the penalty spot after 10 minutes. This goal looked likely to be enough but with just minutes left in the game Airdrie scored an equaliser for a 1–1 draw and a share of the points.

On 22 March the Sons were at Somerset Park to play Ayr United who themselves still had a chance of a Top Ten finish. However it was Dumbarton who returned to form with goals from Tom McAdam (2) and young Ian Wallace to gain a 3–1 victory.

The following Saturday Dundee confirmed their Premier Division place with a hard-fought 2–1 win against Dumbarton. All the goals were scored in the second half with Ian Wallace equalising an earlier Dundee goal before the home side got the winner.

At the end of the month Dumbarton had improved to 15th place with 21 points from 29 games, while Rangers confirmed their first league title in 11 years with four matches to spare.

=== April ===
On 5 April St Johnstone played out a 0–0 draw at Boghead which they deserved only through the heroics of their goalkeeper and by doing so kept their Premier hopes alive.

The following Wednesday evening Dumbarton met Alloa Athletic in the semi-final of the Stirlingshire Cup at Recreation Park. In a thoroughly dominant performance goals from Colin McAdam(2), Ian Wallace(2) and Bourke crushed the opposition in a 5–1 victory.

Then on 12 April the Dumbarton resurgence continued with a convincing 2–1 win against Premier bound Kilmarnock at Rugby Park. The McAdam brothers had the Sons 2-0 ahead at the interval and despite a spirited fight back a goal for the home side just before the end of the game was not enough to prevent a Dumbarton win.

A week later the Sons played Hibernian at Boghead and looked to be heading towards another win as Colin McAdam and Muir had the home side two ahead at the break. However Hibs turned the game on its head with three goals in 17 second half minutes and thus Dumbarton fell to a 3–2 defeat.

The final league game of the season took Dumbarton to Fir Park on 26 April. Motherwell were never in any real danger of losing the match as they were two ahead after 30 minutes. A third midway through the second half was countered by Dumbarton's consolation goal scored by Bourke.

On 28 April the last contest of Dumbarton's season took place as Stenhousemuir arrived at Boghead to play the final of the Stirlingshire Cup. On the night, Dumbarton were easy winners with goals from Ian Wallace, Graham, Bourke and Colin McAdam giving the Sons a 4–1 victory.

=== Post Season Review ===
The big news story at the end of April was a proposed move by Dumbarton to a purpose-built 35,000 capacity stadium at Cumbernauld. The plan was strongly resisted by the fans and in the end it came to nothing.

A number of player milestones were reached during the season with John Cushley and Willie Wallace achieving their 100th appearances during the League matches against Arbroath on 19 February and Kilmarnock on 26 February respectively.

== Results ==
=== Scottish First Division ===
31 August 1974 Scottish Division 1	Dumbarton	2–0	Clyde	Boghead Park
	McAdam, T 35'; Wallace, W 39'			Attendance: 4,000; Referee: E Thomson

7 September 1974 Scottish Division 1	Morton	1–1	Dumbarton	Cappielow Park
	McGhee 62'		McAdam, T 78'	Attendance: 4,000; Referee: D Syme

14 September 1974 Scottish Division 1	Dumbarton	1–1	Dunfermline Athletic	Boghead Park
	McAdam, T 42'		Sinclair 66'	Attendance: 4,000; Referee: D Downie

21 September 1974 Scottish Division 1	Rangers	3–2	Dumbarton	Ibrox Park
	Johnstone 10' 20'; Scott 30'		McAdam, T 44'; Cook 52'	Attendance: 16,000; Referee: H Alexander

28 September 1974 Scottish Division 1	Dumbarton	3–0	Arbroath	Boghead Park
	McAdam, T 1'; Wallace, W 39' (pen.), 69'			Attendance: 2,176; Referee: F Phillips

5 October 1974 Scottish Division 1	Dumbarton	1–3	Celtic	Boghead Park
	Wallace, W 70' (pen.)		Johnstone 3'; Deans 41'; Dalglish 82'	Attendance: 13,000; Referee: W Mullan

12 October 1974 Scottish Division 1	Partick Thistle	2–1	Dumbarton	Firhill Stadium
	Gibson 21' (pen.); Coulston 87'		McAdam, T 60'	Attendance: 5,000; Referee: R Hopkins

19 October 1974 Scottish Division 1	Dumbarton	2–3	Aberdeen	Boghead Park
	Wallace, W 18' (pen.); Cook 70'		McCall 9'; Jarvie 52'; Graham 61'	Attendance: 4,000; Referee: J Gordon

26 October 1974 Scottish Division 1	Dundee United	3–3	Dumbarton	Tannadice Park
	Gray 63' 72' 86'		McAdam, T 44'; Ruddy 81'; Wallace, W 85'	Attendance: 4,000; Referee: I Foote

2 November 1974 Scottish Division 1	Dumbarton	2–0	Airdrie	Boghead Park
	Wallace, W 6', 38'			Attendance: 3,100; Referee: I Foote

9 November 1974 Scottish Division 1	Hearts	2–1	Dumbarton	Tynecastle Stadium
	Murray 16'; Callaghan 54'		Cook 64'	Attendance: 10,000; Referee: A Webster

16 November 1974 Scottish Division 1	Dumbarton	1–2	Ayr United	Boghead Park
	Wallace, W 10'		Ingram 19' 57'	Attendance: 4,000; Referee: D Ramsay

23 November 1974 Scottish Division 1	Dumbarton	0–0	Dundee	Boghead Park
				Attendance: 4,500; Referee: K Hope

30 November 1974 Scottish Division 1	St Johnstone	3–0	Dumbarton	Muirton Park
	O'Rourke 18'; Cramond 59'; Muir 87'			Attendance: 2,000; Referee: C Hutton

14 December 1974 Scottish Division 1	Hibernian	2–0	Dumbarton	Easter Road
	Harper 21'; Duncan 67'			Attendance: 8,566; Referee: T Muirhead

21 December 1974 Scottish Division 1	Dumbarton	0–1	Motherwell	Boghead Park
			Pettigrew 70'	Attendance: 3,000; Referee: J Grant

28 December 1974 Scottish Division 1	Clyde	1–3	Dumbarton	Shawfield Stadium
	Franchetti 62'		Bourke 9', 39'; Muir 60'	Attendance: 2,000; Referee: J Paterson

1 January 1975 Scottish Division 1	Dumbarton	0–0	Morton	Boghead Park
				Attendance: 3,500; Referee: D Syme

4 January 1975 Scottish Division 1	Dunfermline Athletic	3–0	Dumbarton	East End Park
	Mackie 40' 87'; Sinclair 73'			Attendance: 4,000; Referee: E Thomson

11 January 1975 Scottish Division 1	Dumbarton	1–5	Rangers	Boghead Park
	Muir 39'		McLean 24' 32' 83'; Parlane 53'; Johnstone 78'	Attendance: 16,000; Referee: W Mullen

8 February 1975 Scottish Division 1	Dumbarton	0–1	Partick Thistle	Boghead Park
			Craig 23'	Attendance: 4,000; Referee: R Davidson

11 February 1975 Scottish Division 1	Celtic	2–2	Dumbarton	Celtic Park
	Hood 33'; Wilson 37'		Bourke 56'; McAdam, T 67'	Attendance: 15,000; Referee: R Valentine

19 February 1975 Scottish Division 1	Dumbarton	5–1	Arbroath	Boghead Park
	McAdam, C 64', 66', 87' (pen.); Graham 71'; Wallace, W 75'		Reid 29'	Attendance: 1.500; Referee: G Smith

22 February 1975 Scottish Division 1	Aberdeen	1–1	Dumbarton	Pittodrie Park
	Graham 9'		Bourke 32'	Attendance: 9,000; Referee: J Gordon

26 February 1975 Scottish Division 1	Dumbarton	1–1	Kilmarnock	Boghead Park
	McAdam, C 75'		Sheed 15'	Attendance: 2.000; Referee: E Pringle

1 March 1975 Scottish Division 1	Dumbarton	1–2	Dundee United	Boghead Park
	Wallace, W 23' (pen.)		McDonald 35' 49'	Attendance: 2.500; Referee: W Anderson

15 March 1975 Scottish Division 1	Dumbarton	0–1	Hearts	Boghead Park
			Gibson 71'	Attendance: 4,000; Referee: A Paterson

18 March 1975 Scottish Division 1	Airdrie	1–1	Dumbarton	Broomfield Park
	Jonquin 82' (pen.)		Wallace, W 9'	Attendance: 6,000; Referee: I Wallace

22 March 1975 Scottish Division 1	Ayr United	1–3	Dumbarton	Somerset Park
	Graham 66' (pen.)		Wallace, I 22'; McAdam, T 64', 74'	Attendance: 4,000; Referee: J Callaghan

29 March 1975 Scottish Division 1	Dundee	2–1	Dumbarton	Dens Park
	Stewart 57'; Hutchinson 73'		Wallace, I 58'	Attendance: 4,400; Referee: F Phillips

5 April 1975 Scottish Division 1	Dumbarton	0–0	St Johnstone	Boghead Park
				Attendance: 2,000; Referee: E Pringle

12 April 1975 Scottish Division 1	Kilmarnock	1–2	Dumbarton	Rugby Park
	Fleming 85'		McAdam, T 29'; McAdam, C 29'	Attendance: 6,000; Referee: D Downie

19 April 1975 Scottish Division 1	Dumbarton	2–3	Hibernian	Boghead Park
	McAdam, C 13'; Muir 18'		Smith 53'; Duncan 64'; Ruddy 70' (o.g.)	Attendance: 4,000; Referee: J Hopkiss

26 April 1975 Scottish Division 1	Motherwell	3–1	Dumbarton	Fir Park
	Graham 25'; Millar 29' (pen.); McIlwraith 74'		Bourke 75'	Attendance: 6,072; Referee: R Ramsay

=== Scottish Cup ===
29 January 1975 Scottish Cup round 3	Dumbarton	2–1	Clachnacuddin	Boghead Park
	McAdam, T 7', 28'		MacKintosh 68'	Attendance: 4,000; Referee: J Callaghan

15 February 1975 Scottish Cup round 4	Hamilton	0–1	Dumbarton	Douglas Park
			McAdam, T 43'	Attendance: 7,082; Referee: C Hutton

8 March 1975 Scottish Cup round 5	Dumbarton	1–2	Celtic	Boghead Park
	McAdam, T 7'		Glavin 5'; Wilson 61'	Attendance: 16,000; Referee: J Gordon

=== Scottish League Cup ===
10 August 1974 Group 1	Dumbarton	2–3	Clyde	Kilbowie Park
	McAdam, T 4'; Wallace, W 65' (pen.)		Ahern 12' (pen.); Ferris 49'; Boyle 85'	Attendance: 3,000; Referee: T Muirhead

14 August 1974 Group 1	Arbroath	3–3	Dumbarton	Gayfield Park
	Payne 42'; Sellars 46'; Rylance 80'		Bourke 6'; Wallace, W 68'; McAdam, T 74'	Attendance: 1,229; Referee: T Muirhead

17 August 1974 Group 1	Partick Thistle	1–2	Dumbarton	Firhill Stadium
	Coulston 20'		McAdam, T 45'; Bourke 80'	Attendance: 5,000; Referee: R Henderson

21 August 1974 Group 1	Dumbarton	0–2	Arbroath	Kilbowie Park
			Sellars 74'; McIlravey 86'	Attendance: 2,000; Referee: J Foot

24 August 1974 Group 1	Dumbarton	3–1	Partick Thistle	Boghead Park
	Bourke 20'; McAdam, T 79', 89'		Gavin 64'	Attendance: 5,000; Referee: R Keggie

28 August 1974 Group 1	Clyde	1–1	Dumbarton	Shawfield Stadium
	Ferris 74'		McAdam, T 15'	Attendance: 1,000; Referee: D Ramsay

=== Stirlingshire Cup ===
9 April 1975 Semi-final	Alloa Athletic	1–5	Dumbarton	Boghead Park
	Morrison 41'		McAdam, C 17', 80' (pen.); Wallace, I 26', 46'; Bourke

28 April 1975 Final	Dumbarton	4–1	Stenhousemuir	Boghead Park
	Wallace, I 29'; Graham 49'; Bourke 63'; McAdam, C 66'		McLean 65'	Referee: B McGinlay

=== Friendlies ===
August 1974 Friendly	(Spain) Sitges UE	1–4	Dumbarton	Sitges
	Goal		Bourke; Wallace, W Ruddy; Brown

August 1974 Friendly	(Spain) St Martin	1–6	Dumbarton	St Martin
	Goal		Wallace, W Bourke; Coleman

== Player statistics ==
=== Squad ===
No.	Pos	Nat	Player	Total		First Division		Scottish Cup		League Cup	
No.	Pos	Nat	Player	Apps	Goals	Apps	Goals	Apps	Goals	Apps	Goals
	GK	(Scotland) SCO	Ian McGregor	20	0	18	0	2	0	0	0
	GK	(Scotland) SCO	Laurie Williams	23	0	16	0	1	0	6	0
	DF	(Scotland) SCO	Colin McAdam	26	7	18+1	6	3	0	3+1	1
	DF	(Scotland) SCO	Terry Mullen	23	0	16+1	0	0	0	6	0
	DF	(Scotland) SCO	Don Watt	43	0	34	0	3	0	6	0
	MF	(Scotland) SCO	Alan Bennett	9	0	2+1	0	0	0	6	0
	MF	(Scotland) SCO	Drew Checkley	11	0	4+2	0	0	0	5	0
	MF	(Scotland) SCO	John Cushley	34	0	24+2	0	3	0	5	0
	MF	(Scotland) SCO	Johnny Graham	37	1	28	1	3	0	6	0
	MF	(Scotland) SCO	Jim Muir	30	3	27+1	3	2	0	0	0
	MF	(Scotland) SCO	Denis Ruddy	39	1	28+2	1	3	0	6	0
	FW	(Scotland) SCO	John Bourke	40	8	29+2	5	3	0	6	3
	FW	(Scotland) SCO	Ally Brown	13	0	10+3	0	0	0	0	0
	FW	(Scotland) SCO	Peter Coleman	33	8	19+8	8	1+2	0	2+1	0
	FW	(Scotland) SCO	Jim Cook	31	3	24+5	3	2	0	0	0
	FW	(Scotland) SCO	Ross Mathie	3	0	2+1	0	0	0	0	0
	FW	(Scotland) SCO	Tom McAdam	42	20	32+1	11	3	4	6	5
	FW	(Scotland) SCO	Roy McCormack	6	0	4+2	0	0	0	0	0
	FW	(Scotland) SCO	Willie Menmuir	10	0	6+1	0	1+1	0	0+1	0
	FW	(Scotland) SCO	Ian Wallace	11	2	7+1	2	0	0	3	0
	FW	(Scotland) SCO	Willie Wallace	35	14	26	12	3	0	6	2

=== Transfers ===
==== Players in ====
Player	From	Date
(Scotland) Murdo MacLeod	(Scotland) Glasgow Am	21 Jul 1974
(Scotland) Ally Brown	(Scotland) Vale of Leven	30 Jul 1974
(Scotland) Brian Brown	(Scotland) Gairdoch United	30 Jul 1974
(Scotland) Willie Menmuir	(Scotland) Hearts	30 Jul 1974
(Scotland) Jim Muir	(Scotland) Motherwell	26 Aug 1974
(Scotland) Jim Cook	(Scotland) Kilmarnock	3 Sep 1974
(Scotland) Alan Bennett	(Scotland) Hamilton	21 Nov 1974

==== Players out ====
Player	To	Date
(Scotland) John Taylor	(Scotland) Stranraer	21 May 1974
(Scotland) Willie Borland	(Scotland) Stranraer	28 May 1974
(Scotland) Stewart Pringle	(Scotland) Blantyre Vics	8 Jun 1974
(Scotland) Gordon Menzies	(Scotland) Kirkintilloch RR	26 Jun 1974
(Scotland) Brian Heron	(England) Oxford Utd	6 Jul 1974
(Scotland) John Patterson	(Scotland) Cambuslang Rangers	9 Jul 1974
(Scotland) Billy Wilkinson	(Scotland) Alloa Ath	8 Aug 1974
(Scotland) Willie Whigham	(England) Darlington	22 Aug 1974
(Scotland) Willie Wallace	(Australia) APIA	28 Mar 1975
(Scotland) Davie Wilson	(Scotland) Coaching	

== Reserve team ==
Dumbarton competed in the Scottish Reserve League, and with 11 wins and 6 draws from 34 matches, finished 14th of 18.

In the Scottish Second XI Cup, Dumbarton lost to Hamilton in the first round.

In the Scottish Reserve League Cup, Dumbarton failed to qualifying from their section.
