= 1973–74 Dumbarton F.C. season =

Dumbarton
1973–1974 season
- Manager: Alex Wright
- Stadium: Boghead Park, Dumbarton
- Scottish League Division 1: 10th
- Scottish Cup: Fourth round
- Scottish League Cup: Second Round
- Top goalscorer: League: Brian Heron (8); All: Brian Heron (9)

The 1973–74 season was the 90th football season in which Dumbarton competed at a Scottish national level, entering the Scottish Football League, the Scottish Cup and the Scottish League Cup. In addition Dumbarton played in the Stirlingshire Cup.

== Story of the Season ==
=== Players ===
Following the last day escape from relegation in the previous season, it was hoped that this season would show a vast improvement, and to this end Davy Wilson gave up his playing boots to become assistant to manager Alex Wright.

Missing from the first XI was Charlie Gallagher who retired after 3 seasons at Boghead with 96 appearances and 40 goals. In addition Jake Bolton was given a free transfer after 3 successful seasons and 111 appearances in a Dumbarton shirt.

Amongst those joining up were goalkeeper John Taylor from Queen's Park, and full backs Peter McQuade and Don Watt from East Fife and Celtic respectively.

=== August ===
The first game of season 1973-74 saw Dumbarton host a first round Stirlingshire Cup tie against Clydebank and easily triumphed 3–0.

The next day a 16-man squad left for a training camp in Spain – the first trip abroad for the club since 1922. During the trip they played a friendly match on 7 August against Spanish regional side LLloret de Mar, winning 5–1.

Upon returning Dumbarton entered the League Cup group stage alongside Ayr United, Morton and Hibernian. The team secured one point from their opening four matches. This came from a 1–1 home draw against Morton The remaining three away games resulted in defeats:2-0 against Ayr United, 1-0 against Hibernian and 1–0 against Morton.

Meanwhile, Dumbarton accepted a £40,000 offer from Dundee for Tom McAdam, but left it up to the young striker to decide as to his future.

On 25 August Dumbarton played the return League Cup tie against Hibernian at Boghead, crushing the Easter Road side 4-1 and leaving the door still open for qualification to the next round. The subsequent 1–0 home win against Ayr United four days later confirmed this and a lucrative second round tie against Rangers. The good news continued as McAdam decided to remain at Boghead.

=== September ===
The new league season commenced on 1 September with a home tie against Dundee United, but despite having the visitors under siege for most of the match, Dundee United won the match 2–1.

The following weekend it was a trip to Brockville to play Falkirk but this time the Dumbarton pressure was converted into goals with a 3–2 win.

On 12 September the first leg of the second round League Cup tie was played against Rangers at Ibrox. Dumbarton were missing John Cushley and Brian Heron, and the previous season's Scottish Cup winning side easily brushed the Sons aside 6–0.

Roy McCormack joined Cushley and Heron on the injury list when Ayr United came to Boghead for the league fixture on 15 September and in a disappointing game the home side lost 2–0.

The bad results continued a week later at Gayfield when a one-goal advantage and barrowloads of other chances were thrown away to lose 2–1 to Arbroath.

The final game of September however saw Dumbarton pick up their first home league win of the season with a deserved 2–0 win over Partick Thistle. On the same day Dumbarton signed teenager Iain Wallace from junior side Yoker Athletic – a player from whom much would be heard from in the future.

So at the end of the month Hearts led the way in the league with 8 points, a point ahead of Motherwell. Dumbarton were in 13th place on 4 points.

=== October ===
On 6 October Dumbarton visited Bayview and Dumbarton came away with both points after an 88th minute Paterson goals secured a 1-0 league win over East Fife.

Four days later, Rangers cruised through to the quarter-finals of the League Cup by following up their first leg 6–0 win with a 2–1 victory at Boghead.

The following weekend it was Aberdeen who came to Dumbarton in the league and after a closely contested game it was the visitors who left with the points after a Drew Jarvie goal was enough to complete a 1–0 win.

Unbeaten Hearts hosted Dumbarton on 20 October. Hearts were frustrated by a Dumbarton defensive line up and the match ended in a 0–0 draw – although things could have been worse for Hearts as in the last 10 minutes a penalty claim was turned down as Roy McCormack was upended in the area and an unmarked Willie Wallace missed the target from eight yards.

A week later the Sons travelled to Shawfield in the league to play Clyde and in a fast flowing attacking game Dumbarton achieved a comfortable 3–0 win. After the game Alex Wright's position as manager was made full time.

At the end of October Celtic and Hearts led the way in the league with 13 points, while Dumbarton had climbed to 8th with 9 points.

=== November ===
Dumbarton celebrated Alex Wright's first game as full time manager on 3 November with a second successive 3–0 win this time against Motherwell at Boghead – and at the same time moved into 6th place in the league.

However the unbeaten run came to an end a week later when Dundee held on to record a 2–1 win against the Sons at Dens Park.

On 17 November Dumbarton were back in winning ways when they came back from a half time 1–0 deficit to beat St Johnstone 2–1 at Boghead with two Brian Heron goals.

The following weekend saw Celtic visit a muddy Boghead and while silky football was little in evidence, goals from Kenny Dalglish and Bobby Lennox were enough for the visitors to see off the Sons.

This meant Celtic headed the league at the end of the month with 21 points from 12 games – 3 points ahead of Hearts. Dumbarton were in 13th place with 13 points.

=== December ===
Bad weather caused postponements for a number of weeks meaning the next game took place on 15 December at Cappielow against Morton. A goal in the first half put Dumbarton ahead but two goals in quick succession early in the second half followed by the ordering off of a player from each sides turned the match on its head and eventually Morton finished as 3–1 victors.

The following week Dumbarton entertained Rangers at Boghead and a powerful display by the visitors in the first half was enough to earn both points in a 2–0 win.

On 29 December Dumbarton were on the road again this time to Tannadice to face off against Dundee United and in a superb display topped off by four goals from teenager Andy Gray, the home team devastated the Sons by 6–0.

The same weekend long term utility player Kenny Jenkins announced his intention to emigrate to Australia. Over five seasons Jenkins had played 175 matches for Dumbarton and had scored 22 goals.

So 1973 ended with Celtic pulling further ahead in the league with 27 points from 16 matches played – 6 ahead of Rangers, while Dumbarton had slipped to 13th still with 13 points.

=== January ===
The first game of 1974 brought winless Falkirk to Boghead, but it was to be Dumbarton who would suffer their fifth straight defeat with the Bairns breaking their duck in handsome fashion, 5–1.

On 5 January Dumbarton visited Somerset Park to play Ayr United and the plan to stem the leaky defence appeared to work as a Ross Mathie goal was sufficient to take both points.

A week later Arbroath came to Boghead and in the first half it looked as if the previous defensive frailties had returned as the visitors led 2–0. However a freak goal by Colin McAdam where a free kick taken 5 yards inside his own half bounced on the penalty spot and over the goalkeeper followed by a Willie Wallace strike changed the whole complexion of the game. Thereafter it was all Dumbarton and a Ross Mathie hat-trick completed an amazing 5–2 win.

Away from the domestic scene, Scotland had qualified for the World Cup finals and Dumbarton made an amazing offer to one of Scotland's future opponents Zaire to play a friendly. Current SFA rules prohibited club sides from meeting international teams but the plan was to play a select XI. As it was the proposal never came off.

On 19 January Dumbarton travelled to Firhill to play Partick Thistle but despite both teams playing attacking games the game finished in a 0–0 draw.

Three days later Dumbarton paid a nominal fee to Norwich City for the transfer of Alan Black who had in fact left Dumbarton 11 years earlier on a free transfer.

The following week Dumbarton headed north to Arbroath in the third round of the Scottish Cup. It was not however to be a repeat of the fine win a fortnight earlier as the home side recorded a 1–0 victory to advance to the next round.

The top of the league at the end of January had Celtic still in front with 34 points from 19 games played – but it was now Hibernian who were the nearest challengers, 6 points behind. Dumbarton were in 11th with 18 points from 20 matches.

=== February ===
After a free week Dumbarton travelled to Pittodrie to play Aberdeen in the league, While the game ended in a 3–0 defeat it was overshadowed by bad injuries to two players. During the game Dons young striker Bobby Street broke his leg and Sons goalkeeper Lawrie Williams suffered a fractured cheekbone.

On 16 February East Fife were the visitors to Boghead and not for the first time this season the name of the ground was playing true to its name. Appropriately the goals were scored from headers and finished in a 1–1 draw.

The following weekend Hearts arrived on league business and while the playing surface continued to cause problems the visitors managed to leave with both points after a 1–0 win.

At the end of February Celtic continued at the top of the league with 36 points from 22 games played, still being chased by Hibernian, now 5 points behind. Dumbarton maintained 11th place with 19 points from 23 matches.

=== March ===
The Boghead surface continued to cause problems as Clyde arrived to play their league fixture on 9 March but it was the visitors who adapted quicker to the conditions and went into an early lead. Nevertheless, a 16-yard strike from Wallace in the second half was enough to earn Dumbarton a point.

The next match occurred on 23 March with an away tie against St Johnstone and it looked like Dumbarton were easing towards both points with a 2–0 lead. The home team's goal on 69 minutes seemed to be only a consolation as the game moved into time added. Then St Johnstone's Muir scored a quick double which turned the match on its head - only for Colin McAdam to mount a last gasp counterattack and score the equaliser in the 93rd minute.

In midweek, Dumbarton took a rest from league business to visit Firs Park in a Stirlingshire Cup semi final tie against East Stirling – only progressing on penalties after struggling to a 2–2 draw.

The following weekend Dumbarton visited Celtic Park to take on the team going for their ninth title in a row – but it was the underdogs who shocked the Celtic crowd going in at half time 2–1 up. Kenny Dalglish levelled matters but back came the Sons with an 18-yard strike from Peter Coleman – only for Dixie Deans to equalise with 6 minutes to play.

=== April ===
On 6 April Hibernian came to Boghead, and once again Dumbarton led the way at half time by 2–1. However Hibs fought back and were level by the 60th minute only for John Bourke to push Dumbarton ahead once more three minutes later. But for the third week in a row the result would finish as a 3–3 draw as Cropley scored a last minute goal for the visitors.

Three days later Dumbarton travelled to Motherwell and despite a spirited performance it was the Sons who left pointless in a 2–0 defeat.

Dumbarton had now gone 9 league games without a win and relegation worries were not far away. On 13 April the Sons arrived at East End Park to play fellow strugglers Dunfermline, and despite taking an early 2–0 lead it was the Fifers who came back to snatch a 3–2 win.

Things did not get any better four days later in a midweek match against Hibernian at Easter Road, with Hibs strolling to a comfortable 3–0 win.

However, on 20 April, relegation woes were finally dispelled with a 1–0 win over Morton – the first league success since 11 January.

This was followed up with a second successive 1–0 win at Boghead on 24 April – this time against Dunfermline.

In the final league game of April – and the seventh game in 3 weeks – Dumbarton travelled to Ibrox to play Rangers. The home side were easily the better side but had only a Fyfe goal to show for their superiority at half time. However two Scott goals early in the second half decided the tie, with Heron scoring a consolation goal in the 3–1 defeat.

Four days later Dumbarton took on Stirling Albion at Boghead in the final of the Stirlingshire Cup, with the home side just failing to retain the trophy after losing a penalty shoot-out following a 2–2 draw.

=== May ===
The final game of the league campaign presented Dumbarton with the opportunity to claim 10th spot in the league and a place in next season's Texaco Cup – and first half goals from Heron and Bourke were sufficient to beat Dundee 2–0. However, as it happened the qualification rules were amended and the Texaco Cup dream was not to be.

=== Post Season Review ===
While Celtic had scooped their record ninth title in a row, Dumbarton had their best league campaign since 1918.

During the season Roy McCormack made his 300th appearance for Dumbarton (on 23 February against Hearts). In addition Billy Wilkinson made his ‘century’ of appearances in a Dumbarton shirt against East Fife on 6 October.

== Results ==
=== Scottish First Division ===
1 September 1973 Scottish Division 1	Dumbarton	1–2	Dundee United	Boghead Park
	Borland 83'		Fleming 64'; Gray 70'	Attendance: 4,500; Referee: A Paterson

8 September 1973 Scottish Division 1	Falkirk	2–3	Dumbarton	Brockville Park
	Somner 43'; Young 62'		McAdam, T 8'; McCormack 11', 35'	Attendance: 3,000; Referee: D Ramsay

15 September 1973 Scottish Division 1	Dumbarton	0–2	Ayr United	Boghead Park
			Ferguson 25', 82'	Attendance: 3,500; Referee: R Gordon

22 September 1973 Scottish Division 1	Arbroath	2–1	Dumbarton	Gayfield Park
	Sellars 60'; Pirie 81'		Wallace 22' (pen.)	Attendance: 2,623; Referee: W Anderson

29 September 1973 Scottish Division 1	Dumbarton	2–0	Partick Thistle	Boghead Park
	Patterson 39'; McAdam 82'			Attendance: 4,000; Referee: R C Greenlees

6 October 1973 Scottish Division 1	East Fife	0–1	Dumbarton	Bayview Park, Methil
			Patterson 88'	Attendance: 2,622; Referee: G R Smith

13 October 1973 Scottish Division 1	Dumbarton	0–1	Aberdeen	Boghead Park
			Jarvie 60'	Attendance: 4,000; Referee: T Muirhead

20 October 1973 Scottish Division 1	Hearts	0–0	Dumbarton	Tynecastle Stadium
				Attendance: 10,500; Referee: C Hutton

27 October 1973 Scottish Division 1	Clyde	0–3	Dumbarton	Shawfield Stadium
			McCormack 26'; Heron 50'; Coleman 71'	Attendance: 2,000; Referee: R O Valentine

3 November 1973 Scottish Division 1	Dumbarton	3–0	Motherwell	Boghead Park
	Heron 29'; Bourke 58'; McCormack 86'			Attendance: 6,000; Referee: R H Davidson

10 November 1973 Scottish Division 1	Dundee	2–1	Dumbarton	Dens Park
	Wallace 6', 29'		McAdam, C 73'	Attendance: 4,000; Referee: T R Kyle

17 November 1973 Scottish Division 1	Dumbarton	2–1	St Johnstone	Boghead Park
	Heron 47', 52'		Pearson 25'	Attendance: 3,500; Referee: J Callaghan

24 November 1973 Scottish Division 1	Dumbarton	0–2	Celtic	Boghead Park
			Dalglish 11'; Lennox 54' (pen.)	Attendance: 9,000; Referee: J R P Gordon

15 December 1973 Scottish Division 1	Morton	3–1	Dumbarton	Cappielow Park
	Osborne 55', 57'; Murray 77'		Heron 39'	Attendance: 1,000; Referee: I Foote

22 December 1973 Scottish Division 1	Dumbarton	0–2	Rangers	Boghead Park
			Parlane 14'; Young 31'	Attendance: 7,000; Referee: A F McDonald

29 December 1973 Scottish Division 1	Dundee United	6–0	Dumbarton	Tannadice Park
	Gray 18', 59', 65', 76'; Traynor 32'; Kopel 48'			Attendance: 3,000; Referee: R C Greenlees

2 January 1974 Scottish Division 1	Dumbarton	1–5	Falkirk	Boghead Park
	Mathie 15'		Wheatley 13' (pen.); Whiteford 34'; Lawson 48', 71'; Hoggan 73'	Attendance: 3,000; Referee: A Paterson

5 January 1974 Scottish Division 1	Ayr United	0–1	Dumbarton	Somerset Park
			Mathie 37'	Attendance: 3,500; Referee: R Gordon

11 January 1974 Scottish Division 1	Dumbarton	5–2	Arbroath	Boghead Park
	McAdam, C 48'; Wallace 55'; Mathie 57', 59', 68'		Pirie 17'; Fletcher 38'	Attendance: 2,000; Referee: A McCririck

19 January 1974 Scottish Division 1	Partick Thistle	0–0	Dumbarton	Firhill
				Attendance: 4,000; Referee: H Alexander

9 February 1974 Scottish Division 2	Aberdeen	3–0	Dumbarton	Pittodrie Park
	Young 50'; Robb 86'; Jarvie 88'			Attendance: 4,000; Referee: B R McGinlay

16 February 1974 Scottish Division 1	Dumbarton	1–1	East Fife	Boghead Park
	Mathie 53'		Kinnear 58'	Attendance: 3, o00 Referee: B Ramsay

23 February 1974 Scottish Division 1	Dumbarton	0–1	Hearts	Boghead Park
			Gibson 36'	Attendance: 5,000; Referee: C H Hutton

9 March 1974 Scottish Division 1	Dumbarton	1–1	Clyde	Boghead Park
	Wallace 68'		Ferris 3'	Attendance: 5,000; Referee: T Muirhead

23 March 1974 Scottish Division 1	St Johnstone	3–3	Dumbarton	Muirton Park
	Pearson 69'; Muir 91', 92'		McAdam, T 40'; Heron 60'; McAdam, C 93'	Attendance: 2,052; Referee: W J Mullan

30 March 1974 Scottish Division 1	Celtic	3–3	Dumbarton	Celtic Park
	Wilson 7'; Dalglish 61'; Deans 83'		McAdam, T 9'; McAdam, C 35'; Coleman 76'	Attendance: 19,000; Referee: R D Henderson

6 April 1974 Scottish Division 1	Dumbarton	3–3	Hibernian	Boghead Park
	McAdam, T 8'; McAdam, C 42'; Bourke 63'		Duncan 7'; Cropley 59' (pen.), 89'	Attendance: 4,500; Referee: j Callaghan

9 April 1974 Scottish Division 1	Motherwell	2–0	Dumbarton	Fir Park
	Pettigrew 73', 75'			Attendance: 3,337; Referee: W Mullen

13 April 1974 Scottish Division 1	Dunfermline Athletic	3–2	Dumbarton	East End Park
	Baillie 37'; McCallum 61'; Campbell 73'		McAdam, T 19'; Bourke 31'	Attendance: 4,000; Referee: R Henderson

17 April 1974 Scottish Division 1	Hibernian	3–0	Dumbarton	Easter Road
	Gordon 1', 12', 66'			Attendance: 7,859; Referee: R Davidson

20 April 1974 Scottish Division 1	Dumbarton	1–0	Morton	Boghead Park
	Bourke 4'			Attendance: 4,500; Referee: A McKenzie

24 April 1974 Scottish Division 1	Dumbarton	1–0	Dunfermline Athletic	Boghead Park
	Bourke 69'			Attendance: 4,500; Referee: W Anderson

27 April 1974 Scottish Division 1	Rangers	3–1	Dumbarton	Ibrox Park
	Fyfe 8'; Scott 52', 56'		Heron 70'	Attendance: 10,000; Referee: R C Greenlees

10 May 1974 Scottish Division 1	Dumbarton	2–0	Dundee	Boghead Park
	Heron 29' (pen.); Bourke 38'			Attendance: 1,000; Referee: A McDonald

=== Scottish Cup ===
26 January 1974 Scottish Cup round 3	Arbroath	1–0	Dumbarton	Gayfield Park
	Sellars 19'			Attendance: 2,796; Referee: A McKenzie

=== Scottish League Cup ===
11 August 1973 Group 2	Ayr United	2–0	Dumbarton	Somerset Park
	McLean 10', 68'			Attendance: 7,500; Referee: J Callaghan

15 August 1973 Group 2	Dumbarton	1–1	Morton	Boghead Park
	Heron 47' (pen.)		McIlmoyle 15'	Attendance: 3,000; Referee: A McCririck

18 August 1973 Group 2	Hibernian	1–0	Dumbarton	Easter Road Stadium
	Gordon 10'			Attendance: 11,318; Referee: T Kyle

22 August 1973 Group 2	Morton	1–0	Dumbarton	Cappielow Park
	McIlmoyle 30'			Attendance: 2,000; Referee: R McGinlay

26 August 1973 Group 2	Dumbarton	4–1	Hibernian	Boghead Park
	Wallace 4'; McAdam, T 31'; Jenkins 52'; McCormack 73'		Gordon 67'	Attendance: 4,500; Referee: H Alexander

29 August 1973 Group 2	Dumbarton	1–0	Ayr United	Boghead Park
	McCormack 68'			Attendance: 5,000; Referee: J Grant

12 September 1973 Round 2(1)	Rangers	6–0	Dumbarton	Ibrox Park
	Parlane 1', 8', 22' (pen.); Young 12', 51'; Greig 41' (pen.)			Attendance: 25,000; Referee: G B Smith

10 October 1973 Round 2(2)	Dumbarton	1–2	Rangers	Boghead Park
	McCormack 76'		Scott 14'; Fyfe 59'	Attendance: 6,000; Referee: G B Smith

=== Stirlingshire Cup ===
1 August 1973 First round	Dumbarton	3–0	Clydebank	Boghead Park
	Coleman 55'; Mathie 85', 86'			Referee: R Gordon

26 March 1974 Semi-final	East Stirling	2–2 (4-5 p)	Dumbarton	Firs Park
	McAdam, C Mathie		Goal

29 April 1974 Final	Dumbarton	2–2 (2-4 p)	Stirling Albion	Boghead Park
	Wallace; McAdam, T		Goal

=== Friendly ===
7 August 1973	(Spain) Lloret	1–5	Dumbarton	Lloret de Mar
	Goal		Graham; Mathie; Bourke; McAdam, T

== Player statistics ==
=== Squad ===
No.	Pos	Nat	Player	Total		First Division		Scottish Cup		League Cup	
No.	Pos	Nat	Player	Apps	Goals	Apps	Goals	Apps	Goals	Apps	Goals
	GK	(Scotland) SCO	John Taylor	16	0	9	0	0	0	7	0
	GK	(Scotland) SCO	Laurie Williams	27	0	25	0	1	0	1	0
	DF	(Scotland) SCO	Alan Black	10	0	10	0	0	0	0	0
	DF	(Scotland) SCO	Colin McAdam	24	5	20+3	5	1	0	0	0
	DF	(Scotland) SCO	Allan McKay	18	0	14+2	0	1	0	1	0
	DF	(Scotland) SCO	Peter McQuade	11	0	4	0	0	0	7	0
	DF	(Scotland) SCO	Terry Mullen	9	0	8+1	0	0	0	0	0
	DF	(Scotland) SCO	Don Watt	19	0	11+1	0	0	0	7	0
	DF	(Scotland) SCO	Billy Wilkinson	22	0	21	0	0	0	1	0
	MF	(Scotland) SCO	John Cushley	38	0	29+1	0	1	0	7	0
	MF	(Scotland) SCO	Johnny Graham	27	0	15+4	0	0	0	6+2	0
	MF	(Scotland) SCO	Kenny Jenkins	12	1	3+3	0	0	0	3+3	1
	MF	(Scotland) SCO	Gordon Menzies	30	0	21	0	1	0	8	0
	MF	(Scotland) SCO	Denis Ruddy	33	0	29+2	0	1	0	1	0
	FW	(Scotland) SCO	Willie Borland	6	1	2+1	1	0+1	0	2	0
	FW	(Scotland) SCO	John Bourke	18	8	12+4	7	0	0	2	1
	FW	(Scotland) SCO	Peter Coleman	31	2	23+2	2	0	0	6	0
	FW	(Scotland) SCO	Brian Heron	33	9	25+2	8	1	0	4+1	1
	FW	(Scotland) SCO	Ross Mathie	17	6	9+5	6	1	0	2	0
	FW	(Scotland) SCO	Tom McAdam	26	6	15+3	5	0	0	5+3	1
	FW	(Scotland) SCO	Roy McCormack	32	7	23	4	1	0	8	3
	FW	(Scotland) SCO	Jim McIntyre	1	0	0+1	0	0	0	0	0
	FW	(Scotland) SCO	John Paterson	20	2	15+2	2	1	0	2	0
	FW	(Scotland) SCO	Willie Wallace	41	4	32	3	1	0	8	1

=== Transfers ===
==== Players in ====
Player	From	Date
(Scotland) Willie Borland	(England) Barrow	5 May 1973
(Scotland) Peter McQuade	(Scotland) East Fife	12 May 1973
(Scotland) John Taylor	(Scotland) Queen's Park	5 Jul 1973
(Scotland) Don Watt	(Scotland) Celtic	5 Jul 1973
(Scotland) Terry Mullen	(Scotland) Denny Schools	9 Aug 1973
(Scotland) Stewart Pringle	(Scotland) Glasgow United	21 Sep 1973
(Scotland) Ian Wallace	(Scotland) Yoker Athletic	29 Sep 1973
(Scotland) Jim Brown	(Scotland) Vale of Leven	19 Nov 1973
(Scotland) Jim McIntyre	(Scotland) St Patricks High School	19 Nov 1973
(Scotland) Drew Checkley	(Scotland) Vale of Leven	19 Jan 1974
(Scotland) Alan Black	(England) Norwich City	23 Jan 1974
(Scotland) Alan Mackin	(Scotland) Kilwinning Rangers	30 Mar 1974
(Scotland) Ian McGregor	(Scotland) Kilsyth Rangers	3 Apr 1974

==== Players out ====
Player	To	Date
(Scotland) Ronnie Kidd	(Scotland) Cumnock	5 Jul 1973
(Scotland) Ken Morrison	(Scotland) Beith	1 August 1973
(Scotland) Iain Fearn	(Scotland) Airdrie	3 August 1973
(Scotland) Peter McQuade	(Scotland) Berwick Rangers	24 January 1974
(Scotland) Kenny Jenkins	(Australia) APIA	
(Scotland) Alan Black	(Scotland) Retired	
(Scotland) Allan McKay	(Scotland) Retired	

== Reserve team ==
Dumbarton competed in the Scottish Reserve League, and with 12 wins and 6 draws from 34 matches, finished 12th of 18 for the second successive season.

Dumbarton again entered the Scottish Second XI Cup, and again reached the third round where Celtic were to prove too good on the day by four goals to none.

For the first time, Dumbarton entered the Scottish Reserve League Cup, and after qualifying from their section with 4 wins and a draw from 6 games, they eventually lost out to Partick Thistle in a two-legged semi final.
