= 1975–76 Dumbarton F.C. season =

Dumbarton
1975–1976 season
- Manager: Alex Wright
- Stadium: Boghead Park, Dumbarton
- Scottish League Division 1: 4th
- Scottish Cup: Semi-final
- Scottish League Cup: Prelims
- Top goalscorer: League: John Bourke (18); All: John Bourke (26)
- Highest home attendance: 4000
- Lowest home attendance: 1500
- Average home league attendance: 2415

Season 1975–76 was the 92nd football season in which Dumbarton competed at a Scottish national level, entering the Scottish Football League for the 70th time, the Scottish Cup for the 81st time and the Scottish League Cup for the 29th time.

== Overview ==
Following league reconstruction, Dumbarton started off in the new Division 1 (second tier) of Scottish league football with a real expectation that promotion to the Premier League could be achieved. However, the departure of Willie Wallace to Australia towards the end of the previous season, followed by the transfer of brothers Colin and Tom McAdam before the end of October left a hole in the squad that proved difficult to overcome.

A poor start in the league, which saw only one win taken from the first 6 fixtures (and included an astonishing 5–5 home draw with East Fife), was to handicap Dumbarton's ambitions, and eventually it required an unbeaten run of 6 games at the end of the league campaign to climb up to a respectable 4th place.

It was however in the Scottish Cup where Dumbarton were to shine and after a third round win over Highland League opposition, Dumbarton were on their way to their first national cup semi-final in almost 80 years having disposed of both the clubs who would finish above them in Division 1's promotion places. Hearts provided the opposition at Hampden and, after a hard-fought 0–0 draw in which Dumbarton had the better chances, they were unable to recover from the loss of an early deflected own goal and the Premier League side eventually headed into Europe as defeated Cup Finalists.

In the League Cup, Dumbarton was handed the toughest of qualifying groups, being up against 3 of the top Premier League sides, and it was no real surprise that there would be no further interest in this competition although a home win, over Hearts ironically, was well received.

Due to the reduction in the number of league games, a new competition was instituted for Division 1 and 2 clubs, named the Spring Cup. Dumbarton qualified from their group with 4 wins from 6 games, and saw off Raith Rovers and Falkirk on their way to another cup semi final. It was however to be their local rivals Clydebank who would go on to the final following a 3–1 defeat. Dumbarton had finished a long season by playing no fewer than 15 matches during a hectic 8 weeks across March and April; 1 league, 3 Scottish Cup, and 11 Spring Cup ties. In a strong second half to the season, and despite the fixture congestion, Dumbarton lost only two games in addition to those semi-final defeats in its closing 23 outings.

Locally, in the Stirlingshire Cup, Dumbarton beat Clydebank on penalties in the first round before surprisingly losing out to Stenhousemuir in the semi-final.

Finally, Dumbarton undertook a mini-tour of England in the pre-season. Following a home game against Preston NE, the team travelled to play Chester and Tranmere Rovers.

== Results & fixtures ==
Win Draw Loss

=== Scottish First Division ===
30 August 1975 Scottish Division 1	Clyde	1–2	Dumbarton	Shawfield Stadium
	Harvey 30'		McLean 65', 72'	Attendance: 1,500; Referee: R Keggie

6 September 1975 Scottish Division 1	Dumbarton	1–4	Falkirk	Boghead Park
	Bourke 28'		Lawson 16', 44'; McCaig 33'; Shirra 83'	Attendance: 3,000; Referee: D Syme

13 September 1975 Scottish Division 1	Montrose	3–2	Dumbarton	Links Park
	Johnston 70', 84'; Barr 74' (pen.)		McLean 7', 65'	Attendance: 1,100; Referee: W Reid

20 September 1975 Scottish Division 1	Dumbarton	2–3	Partick Thistle	Boghead Park
	Bourke 47'; Wallace 62'		Craig, J 33', 77'; Somner 37'	Attendance: 4,000; Referee: J Gordon

27 September 1975 Scottish Division 1	Dumbarton	5–5	East Fife	Boghead Park
	Bourke 2'; McLean 28'; Wallace 40', 62'; Graham 76'		Kinnear 18', 30'; Miller 34', 46'; Hegarty 86'	Attendance: 1,500; Referee: A Ferguson

4 October 1975 Scottish Division 1	Airdrie	3–0	Dumbarton	Broomfield Park
	Jonquin 2' (pen.), 13' (pen.); Wilson 54' (pen.)			Attendance: 2,500; Referee: A Hope

11 October 1975 Scottish Division 1	Dumbarton	4–0	Morton	Boghead Park
	Bourke 21'; Wallace 42'; McAdam 54', 62'			Attendance: 3,000; Referee: A Paterson

18 October 1975 Scottish Division 1	St Mirren	3–2	Dumbarton	Love Street (stadium)
	McGillivray 43'; McDowall 72'; Reid, R 83'		Bourke 54', 81'	Attendance: 3,500; Referee: J Paterson

25 October 1975 Scottish Division 1	Dumbarton	2–1	Queen of the South	Boghead Park
	McAdam 5', 12'		Dempster 57' (pen.)	Attendance: 1,500; Referee: T Kellock

1 November 1975 Scottish Division 1	Arbroath	1–5	Dumbarton	Gayfield Park
	McKenzie 65'		Wallace 31'; Bourke 40'; Cook 73'; McLean 82', 88'	Attendance: 1,682; Referee: T Kyle

8 November 1975 Scottish Division 1	Dumbarton	2–0	Dunfermline Athletic	Boghead Park
	Bourke 34'; Wallace 81'			Attendance: 2,000; Referee: R Keggie

15 November 1975 Scottish Division 1	Dumbarton	5–1	Hamilton	Boghead Park
	Bourke 2'; McLean 19'; Muir 21', 61'; Brown, A 80'		Taylor 11'	Attendance: 2,000; Referee: H Alexander

22 November 1975 Scottish Division 1	Kilmarnock	1–0	Dumbarton	Rugby Park
	Fallis 14'			Attendance: 5,000; Referee: W Mullan

29 November 1975 Scottish Division 1	East Fife	2–1	Dumbarton	Bayview Park, Methil
	Rutherford 25'; Rankin 87' (pen.)		Brown, A 38'	Attendance: 1,493; Referee: A McGunnigle

6 December 1975 Scottish Division 1	Dumbarton	0–0	Airdrie	Boghead Park
				Attendance: 1,500; Referee: A McKenzie

13 December 1975 Scottish Division 1	Morton	1–1	Dumbarton	Cappielow Park
	Reid 86'		Cook 76'	Attendance: 2,500; Referee: JRP Gordon

20 December 1975 Scottish Division 1	Dumbarton	2–0	St Mirren	Boghead Park
	Wallace 44'; Bourke 89'			Attendance: 3,000; Referee: A Paterson

27 December 1975 Scottish Division 1	Queen of the South	4–2	Dumbarton	Palmerston Park
	Reid 16', 21'; Dickson, P 46'; Muir 83' (OG)		McLean 28'; Bourke 34'	Attendance: 2,000; Referee: G Smith

1 January 1976 Scottish Division 1	Falkirk	3–2	Dumbarton	Brockville Park
	Mitchell; Lawson; Whiteford (pen.)		Cook; Bourke	Attendance: 3,000; Referee: R Hopkins

3 January 1976 Scottish Division 1	Dumbarton	0–6	Montrose	Boghead Park
			Miller 13', 32'; Barr 35'; Markland 53'; Stewart 67'; Livingstone 78'	Attendance: 2,000; Referee: T Muirhead

17 January 1976 Scottish Division 1	Dumbarton	3–0	Kilmarnock	Boghead Park
	Bourke 19', 63'; Muir 75'			Attendance: 3,500; Referee: D Ramsay

31 January 1976 Scottish Division 1	Partick Thistle	0–0	Dumbarton	Firhill Park
				Attendance: 6,000; Referee: R Keggie

7 February 1976 Scottish Division 1	Dumbarton	1–0	Clyde	Boghead Park
	Bourke 36'			Attendance: 2,000; Referee: T Kellock

21 February 1976 Scottish Division 1	Dumbarton	3–2	Arbroath	Boghead Park
	McLean 1'; Muir 22'; Wallace 52'		Yule 77'; Fettes 79'	Attendance: 2,500; Referee: T Kyle

28 February 1976 Scottish Division 1	Dunfermline Athletic	0–3	Dumbarton	East End Park
			Bourke 3', 54'; Wallace 13'	Attendance: 2,500; Referee: K Hope

15 March 1976 Scottish Division 1	Hamilton	2–3	Dumbarton	Douglas Park
	Thomas 25', 82'		Wallace 35'; Cook 56'; Kane 78'	Attendance: 1,500; Referee: W Mullen

=== Scottish Cup ===
24 January 1976 Scottish Cup round 3	Dumbarton	2–0	Keith	Boghead Park
	Wallace 21'; Muir 72'		MacKintosh 68'	Attendance: 2,500; Referee: D Downie

14 February 1976 Scottish Cup round 4	Partick Thistle	0–0	Dumbarton	Firhill Park
				Attendance: 8,300; Referee: J Paterson

25 February 1976 Scottish Cup round 4R	Dumbarton	1–0	Partick Thistle	Boghead Park
	Wallace 55'			Attendance: 7,539; Referee: J Paterson

6 March 1976 Scottish Cup round 5	Dumbarton	2–1	Kilmarnock	Boghead Park
	Clarke 53' (OG); Muir 74'		Fallis 64'	Attendance: 7,796; Referee: I Foote

3 April 1976 Scottish Cup Semi-final	Hearts	0–0	Dumbarton	Hampden Park
				Attendance: 16,087; Referee: I Foote

14 April 1976 Scottish Cup Semi-final Replay	Hearts	3–0	Dumbarton	Hampden Park
	Smith 8' (OG); Prentice 35'; Busby 47'			Attendance: 11,273; Referee: I Foote

=== Scottish League Cup ===
9 August 1975 Section 3	Dumbarton	2–1	Hearts	Boghead Park
	McLean 23'; Bourke 89'		Callachan 38'	Attendance: 4,000; Referee: R Davidson

13 August 1975 Section 3	Aberdeen	2–0	Dumbarton	Pittodrie Park
	Graham 7'; Jarvie 37'			Attendance: 6,000; Referee: T Muirhead

16 August 1975 Section 3	Celtic	3–1	Dumbarton	Celtic Park
	Wilson 32'; Lennox 35'; Edvaldsson 84'		McAdam 62'	Attendance: 23,000; Referee: D Downie

20 August 1975 Section 3	Dumbarton	0–1	Aberdeen	Boghead Park
			Hair 72'	Attendance: 3,000; Referee: T Kellock

23 August 1975 Section 3	Dumbarton	0–8	Celtic	Boghead Park
			Hood 4', 57'; McGrain 19'; Dalglish 49', 62'; Callaghan 70'; Wilson 87', 89'	Attendance: 14,000; Referee: R Valentine

27 August 1975 Section 3	Hearts	6–2	Dumbarton	Tynecastle Stadium
	Hancock 6'; Callachan 15'; Prentice 24'; Busby 29', 82'; Park 89'		Cook 28'; Brown 69'	Attendance: 6,000; Referee: A Ferguson

=== Spring Cup ===
10 March 1976 Section 4	Dumbarton	4–1	Albion Rovers	Boghead Park
	Cook 11'; Bourke 14', 88'; Muir 60' (pen.)		McLean 44'	Attendance: 1,123; Referee: D Syme

13 March 1976 Section 4	Arbroath	0–1	Dumbarton	Gayfield Park
			Wallace 64'	Attendance: 1,187; Referee: F Pringle

20 March 1976 Section 4	Stenhousemuir	2–1	Dumbarton	Ochilview Park
	Sinclair 11'; Wight 65'		McKinlay 42'	Attendance: 489; Referee: R Keggie

27 March 1976 Section 4	Dumbarton	1–2	Arbroath	Boghead Park
	Wallace 68'		Bone 61'; Fletcher 80'	Attendance: 1,500; Referee: T Muirhead

7 April 1976 Section 4	Albion Rovers	1–2	Dumbarton	Cliftonhill Stadium
	Sermanni 41'		Wallace 20', 45'	Attendance: 1,000; Referee: A McGunnigle

10 April 1976 Section 4	Dumbarton	3–1	Stenhousemuir	Boghead Park
	McLeod 43'; Bourke 79', 84'		Simpson 57'	Attendance: 1,500; Referee: A Ferguson

17 April 1976 Round 2(1)	Raith Rovers	2–2	Dumbarton	Starks Park
	Graham 14'; Wallace 22'		Brown, A 47'; Cooper 83' (OG)	Attendance: 3,201; Referee: D Syme

19 April 1976 Round 2(2)	Dumbarton	4–0 (6–2 agg.)	Raith Rovers	Boghead Park
	Wallace 3', 27'; Graham 20'; Bourke 23'			Attendance: 2,500; Referee: D Syme

21 April 1976 Round 3(1)	Dumbarton	4–2	Falkirk	Boghead Park
	Harvey 42', 64'; Graham 69'; Bourke 77'		Whiteford 53' (pen.); Lawson 90'	Attendance: 2,000; Referee: I Foote

24 April 1976 Round 3(2)	Falkirk	1–2 (3–6 agg.)	Dumbarton	Brockville Park
	Fowler 67'		Bourke 51'; Brown, A 61'	Attendance: 2,000; Referee: I Foote

28 April 1976 Semi-final	Clydebank	3–1	Dumbarton	Kilbowie Park
	McCallan 57', 80'; Hall 72'		Wallace 60'	Attendance: 3,000; Referee: E Thomson

=== Stirlingshire Cup ===
3 November 1975 1st round	Dumbarton	1–1 (5 – 4 on penalties)	Clydebank	Boghead Park
	McAdam		Cooper 89'

11 November 1975 Semi-final	Stenhousemuir	3–1	Dumbarton	Ochilview Park
	McPaul 10', 52'; Halliday 79'		McCormack 74'

=== Pre-season and other matches ===
16 July 1975 Friendly	Dumbarton	2–0	Vale of Leven	Boghead Park
	Mathie

28 July 1975 Friendly	Queen's Park	2–0	Dumbarton	Hampden Park
	Brown 19' (OG); McGill 71'

30 July 1975 Friendly	Dumbarton	2–2	(England) Preston NE	Boghead Park
	Wallace 19'; McAdam 30'		Elwess 78', 87'	Referee: W Anderson

2 August 1975 Friendly	(England) Chester City	1–1	Dumbarton	Sealand Road
	Lennard 35'		Bourke 89'	Attendance: 1,885; Referee: R Furnell

4 August 1975 Friendly	(England) Tranmere Rovers	2–3	Dumbarton	Prenton Park
	Moore 26'; Peplow		Bourke 10'; Wallace

1 October 1975 Friendly	Dumbarton	5–3	Morton	Boghead Park
	Rankin; OG; Mullen; McCormack; Harvey		Evans; Nelson; Brown

16 March 1976 Friendly	Dumbarton	1–3	Rangers	Boghead Park
	Kane 2'		Sinclair 25' (OG); Fyfe 60'; Scott 85'	Referee: B McGinlay

== League table ==
Pos	Team	Pld	W	D	L	GF	GA	GD	Pts	Promotion or relegation
2	Kilmarnock (P)	26	16	3	7	44	29	+15	35	Promotion to the Premier Division
3	Montrose	26	12	6	8	53	43	+10	30	
4	Dumbarton	26	12	4	10	53	46	+7	28	
5	Arbroath	26	11	4	11	41	39	+2	26	
6	St Mirren	26	9	8	9	37	37	0	26	

Source: RSSSF and statto
Rules for classification: 1) points; 2) goal difference; 3) number of goals scored.
(P) Promoted

== Player statistics ==
=== Squad ===
No.	Pos	Nat	Player	Total		First Division		Scottish Cup		League Cup		Spring Cup	
No.	Pos	Nat	Player	Apps	Goals	Apps	Goals	Apps	Goals	Apps	Goals	Apps	Goals
	GK	(Scotland) SCO	Ian McGregor	4	0	0	0	2	0	2	0	0	0
	GK	(Scotland) SCO	Laurie Williams	46	0	26	0	5	0	4	0	11	0
	DF	(Scotland) SCO	Jim Brown	7	1	1+1	0	3	0	0+2	1	0	0
	DF	(Scotland) SCO	Terry Mullen	24	0	9+2	0	4+1	0	1+1	0	5+1	0
	DF	(Scotland) SCO	Don Watt	48	0	25	0	6	0	6	0	11	0
	MF	(Scotland) SCO	Alan Bennett	6	0	1+2	0	0	0	3	0	0	0
	MF	(Scotland) SCO	Brian Brown	4	0	0+3	0	0	0	0	0	0+1	0
	MF	(Scotland) SCO	John Cushley	3	0	2	0	0	0	1	0	0	0
	MF	(Scotland) SCO	Johnny Graham	48	3	22+3	1	6	0	6	0	11	2
	MF	(Scotland) SCO	Columb McKinley	40	1	19+1	0	6	0	3	0	11	1
	MF	(Scotland) SCO	Hugh McLean	42	11	21+1	10	4+1	0	6	1	6+3	0
	MF	(Scotland) SCO	Donald McNeil	23	0	11+3	0	0+1	0	0	0	7+1	0
	MF	(Scotland) SCO	Jim Muir	33	6	18	3	6	2	4	0	5	1
	MF	(Scotland) SCO	Denis Ruddy	8	0	2+1	0	0	0	4+1	0	0	0
	MF	(Scotland) SCO	Graeme Sinclair	4	0	0	0	0	0	0	0	4	0
	MF	(Scotland) SCO	Walter Smith	36	0	24	0	6	0	0	0	6	0
	FW	(Scotland) SCO	John Bourke	45	26	25	18	6	0	4	1	10	7
	FW	(Scotland) SCO	Ally Brown	38	4	19	2	5	0	5	0	8+1	2
	FW	(Scotland) SCO	Peter Coleman	11	0	5	0	0	0	2+3	0	0+1	0
	FW	(Scotland) SCO	Jim Cook	48	6	25+1	4	5	0	5+1	1	9+2	1
	FW	(Scotland) SCO	Drew Harvey	3	2	0	0	0	0	0	0	2+1	2
	FW	(Scotland) SCO	George Kane	2	1	0+1	1	0	0	0	0	1	0
	FW	(Scotland) SCO	Ross Mathie	1	0	1	0	0	0	0	0	0	0
	FW	(Scotland) SCO	Tom McAdam	12	5	6	4	0	0	5+1	1	0	0
	FW	(Scotland) SCO	Murdo MacLeod	13	1	1+6	0	0	0	0	0	5+1	1
	FW	(Scotland) SCO	Ian Wallace	45	20	25+1	10	6	2	5	0	8	8

=== Transfers ===
==== Players in ====
Player	From	Date
(Scotland) Columb McKinley	(Scotland) Airdrie	19 Jun 1975
(Scotland) Hugh McLean	(England) Swindon Town	8 Jul 1975
(Scotland) Donald McNeil	(Scotland) Eastercraigs	17 Jul 1975
(Scotland) Drew Harvey	(Scotland) Anniesland Waverley	6 Aug 1975
(Scotland) Walter Smith	(Scotland) Dundee United	18 Sep 1975
(Scotland) Graeme Sinclair	(Scotland) Eastercraigs	27 Oct 1975
(Scotland) Martin Mowat	(England) Everton	23 Feb 1976
(Scotland) George Kane	(England) Notts County	4 Mar 1976

==== Players out ====
Player	To	Date
(Scotland) Colin McAdam	(Scotland) Motherwell	19 May 1975
(Scotland) Jim McIntyre	(Scotland) Glasgow Perthshire	28 Jul 1975
(Scotland) Alan Mackin	(Scotland) Renfrew	4 Aug 1975
(Scotland) Willie Menmuir	(Scotland) Alloa Athletic	2 Sep 1975
(Scotland) Denis Ruddy	(Scotland) Stenhousemuir	15 Oct 1975
(Scotland) Tom McAdam	(Scotland) Dundee United	31 Oct 1975
(Scotland) Roy McCormack	(Australia) APIA	14 Feb 1976
(Scotland) Ross Mathie	(Scotland) Motherwell	23 Mar 1976
(Scotland) John Cushley	(Scotland) Coaching	
(Scotland) Drew Checkley	(Scotland) Freed	

== Reserve team ==
Dumbarton competed in the Combined Reserve League and in the Combined Reserve League Cup. Reports of these games are sparse although it is known that Partick Thistle were league champions.

In the Scottish Second XI Cup, Dumbarton lost to Partick Thistle in the third round.

In the Scottish Reserve League Cup, Dumbarton failed to qualifying from their section.

== Trivia ==
- The League Cup match against Celtic on 23 August marked Johnny Graham's 300th appearance for Dumbarton in all national competitions - the 4th Dumbarton player to achieve this accolade.
- The League match against Falkirk on 6 September marked Tom McAdam's 100th appearance for Dumbarton in all national competitions - the 71st Dumbarton player to reach this milestone.
- The League match against Airdrie on 6 December marked Laurie Williams's 200th appearance for Dumbarton in all national competitions - the 13th Dumbarton player to break the 'double century'.
- The Spring Cup match against Stenhousemuir on 20 March marked Don Watt's 100th appearance for Dumbarton in all national competitions - the 72nd Dumbarton player to reach this milestone.
- The Spring Cup match against Raith Rovers on 17 April marked John Bourke's 100th appearance for Dumbarton in all national competitions - the 73rd Dumbarton player to reach this milestone.
- The transfer fee of £40,000 for Tom McAdam's departure to Dundee United at the end of October matched the record set by Kenny Wilson three seasons earlier.
- Dumbarton broke both the goals for and goals against 'centuries' during the season. By scoring 106 goals in all games, this was the 14th time that the 'century - for' had been broken, and by conceding 103, this was the 20th time that the 'century - against' had been broken.

== See also ==
- 1975–76 in Scottish football
