= 1972–73 Dumbarton F.C. season =

Dumbarton
1972–1973 season
- Manager: Jackie Stewart/ Alex Wright
- Stadium: Boghead Park, Dumbarton
- Scottish League Division 1: 16th
- Scottish Cup: Fourth round
- Scottish League Cup: Second Round
- Top goalscorer: League: Roy McCormack (11); All: Roy McCormack (12)
- Highest home attendance: 15,000
- Lowest home attendance: 3,000
- Average home league attendance: 5,765

The 1972–73 season was Dumbarton's official centenary year and the 89th football season in which Dumbarton competed at a Scottish national level, entering the Scottish Football League, the Scottish Cup and the Scottish League Cup. In addition Dumbarton played in the Drybrough Cup and the Stirlingshire Cup.

== Story of the season ==
=== Players ===
The first season back in the 'big time' for over 50 years began with very few changes to the playing staff.

All the first XI from the Second Division winning side had been retained, including Britain's top scorer for the past two seasons, Kenny Wilson. There were just three acquisitions made during the close season to bolster the defence– Willie Whigham came from Middlesbrough as back up for Lawrie Williams 'between the sticks', Denis Ruddy from neighbours Clydebank and most significantly former Celtic full back John Cushley from Dunfermline Athletic .

=== July ===
The season opened on 29 July with the two top scoring sides in Scotland from the previous season meeting at Parkhead in a Drybrough Cup tie with Celtic just squeezing past Dumbarton 2–1 in front of 28,000 fans.

=== August ===
On 7 August touring English Second Division side Carlisle United visited Boghead and after an entertaining game Dumbarton ran out 3–2 winners.

The League Cup campaign began on 12 August and saw Dumbarton drawn against fellow First Division sides Hearts and Airdrie together with Second Division Berwick Rangers. With the top two qualifying from each section hopes were high that progress could be made and these hopes were enhanced when Hearts were defeated 1–0 at Boghead. Despite losing to Berwick Rangers midweek at Sheilfield by the same score, a 4–1 home win over Airdrie on 19 August put things back on track. The win was not without its issues as new signing John Cushley suffered a broken cheekbone, which would keep him out for a number of weeks, with Roy McCormack joining him on the injury list with a bruised ankle.

Nonetheless, two draws were subsequently earned – 2–2 against Berwick at home and 1–1 against Hearts at Tynecastle – and although the final qualifying tie against Airdrie at Broomfield on 30 August was lost 2–1, the 6 points gained was sufficient to go forward to the knock out stages.

=== September ===
2 September marked Dumbarton's first league game in the top division for 50 years, but it was not to be a happy return. Partick Thistle at Firhill proved to be a tough team to crack and Dumbarton left having been defeated 4–1.

A week later at Boghead, Falkirk were the visitors and with both sets of forwards goal shy the game ended in a tame 0–0 draw.

On 16 September it was back to Tynecastle to meet Hearts, but this time on league business – and it was the home team who claimed the 2 points in a 1–0 win.

Four days later Dumbarton entertained Dundee in the first leg of the second round in the League cup, and with the return of Cushley, the problems in front of goal over the past few weeks were forgotten as Dumbarton strolled to a 3–0 victory.

The following Saturday Boghead was again the venue, with Aberdeen visiting on league duty. The new confidence appeared to be continuing as Dumbarton led 1–0 at halftime, but a second half fight back meant the Dons left with both points after a 2–1 win.

The bad news continued through the weekend as it was announced that ace striker Kenny Wilson had been transferred to Carlisle United for a club record fee of £40,000. Kenny had signed from St Johnstone on a free transfer in July 1970 and had scored 87 goals in 101 appearances – his departure created a huge void which would be difficult to fill.

And that was only too evident in the following league match on 30 September against Arbroath where the lack of an effective front man meant Dumbarton could only manage a 0–0 draw.

The top of the league at the end of September looked busy with no fewer than four teams with 8 points – Celtic, Aberdeen, Hibernian and Dundee United. Dumbarton had yet to win and were in 15th place with 2 points.

=== October ===
The departure of Kenny Wilson ensured that the Dumbarton management team were on the search for a suitable replacement, and an offer was made to Crystal Palace for the former Lisbon Lion Willie Wallace.

While Wallace considered matters, Dumbarton played Dundee in the return leg of the second round in the League Cup. Unfortunately the Sons were unable to hold back a rampant Dundee who chalked up a 4–0 victory, to win the tie 4–3 on aggregate.

On 7 October, Dumbarton made the journey to Muirton Park to play St Johnstone in the league. New boy Tom McAdam stepped up from the reserves and was one of the scorers in a 2–0 win – the first for Dumbarton in the league.

The following week, Dumbarton entertained Dundee at Boghead. Willie Wallace had now joined and played a superb game on the wing, while teenager McAdam notched his second goal in two games in a 2–2 draw.

On 21 October, it was a trip to Broomfield in a league game against Airdrie, and it was '3-for-3' for young McAdam together with a Roy McCormack double that snatched both points in a 3–2 win.

In the final league game of October, Dumbarton attempted to get that elusive first league win at Boghead but a goal three minutes from time rescued a point for Hibernian in a 2–2 draw. Nevertheless, Tom McAdam kept his 'goal a game' run going.

On 30 October Dumbarton played Alloa in a Stirlingshire Cup tie and won easily 4-2 – with that man McAdam notching his fifth goal in five games.

So the league at the end of October saw Celtic on top with 15 points, one ahead of Dundee United. Dumbarton had climbed to 13th with 8 points.

=== November ===
The first weekend in November saw Dumbarton visit Methil for a league game against East Fife. Unfortunately two uncharacteristic lapses by Lawrie Williams cost the Sons dearly and despite an 87th-minute goal from McAdam Dumbarton slipped to a 2–1 defeat.

On 11 November it was a trip to Rugby park to play Kilmarnock, and after an eventless first half the home side looked to have wrapped up the points with two quick fire goals at the start of the second half, but McCormack and then McAdam scored to earn Dumbarton a point.

A week later Dumbarton looked to break their winless league streak at home with a game against Morton, and despite two goals from Tom McAdam (9 goals in 8 games) the Sons had to settle for a 2–2 draw.

The final league game of November was a visit to Ibrox where despite a McCormack equaliser 15 minutes into the second half, Rangers stamina proved too much as the game went on and they eventually won 3–1.

So at the end of the month Celtic still were ahead on 23 points but pulling ahead – 4 points now in front of Hibernian. Dumbarton maintained 13th place with 10 points.

=== December ===
A week after the Rangers game, Dumbarton faced the other half of the Old Firm at Boghead, but this time there was no question as to the outcome as Celtic outclassed the Sons from the start and ran out 6–1 victors.

On 9 December Dumbarton appeared to be suffering from a hang over from the previous week and never got going against Ayr United at Somerset Park, losing out 2–0.

The following week Motherwell visited Boghead and in a game which turned into a pantomime due to the state of the pitch, skills were at a premium and a 0–0 draw was probably a fair result.

On the day before Christmas Eve, it was a visit to Tannadice and at half time Dundee United appeared to be giving their presents early as Dumbarton led by 2 own goals to 1. However, they were not to make the same mistakes in the second half, and eventually it was the home side who were to win 3–2.

The final league game of 1972, and of Dumbarton's centenary year, was played out at Boghead against Partick Thistle. A home victory in the league was still proving elusive and at half time it looked like the wait may have to go on as the Jags led 2–1. However 3 goals in the second half brought the year to a satisfactory end with a 4–2 win.

So as 1972 came to an end Celtic still headed the league with 28 points, but their lead over Hibernian had been cut to 2 points. Dumbarton had dropped to 14th place with 13 points, but importantly 6 points clear of relegation.

=== January ===
The first game of 1973 saw the visit of Hearts to Boghead, but there was to be no continuation of home success as Dumbarrton suffered a 2–0 defeat.

The team were to be hit with further bad news as it was announced that manager Jackie Stewart had agreed to take over at rivals St Johnstone. However assistant manager Alex Wright (formerly boss at St Mirren and Dunfermline) was the obvious choice to take over the reins.

On 20 January Dumbarton visited Gayfield to face Arbroath in the league and in a game spoiled by the blustery wing it was the home team who came out on top 2–1.

The final game of January saw the return of Jackie Stewart to Boghead with his new team St Johnstone and despite having most of the play Dumbarton could only manage a 1–1 draw. In fact it could have been worse had St Johnstone scored from a soft penalty awarded 16 minutes from time.

So as January came to a close Rangers had taken over at the top with 35 points, 3 points ahead of Celtic but with 3 more games played. Dumbarton had now slipped to 16th with 14 points – perilously close to the relegation places just 2 ahead of Kilmarnock.

=== February ===
The first game of February was a Scottish Cup third round tie against Cowdenbeath at Boghead. A 4–1 victory was recorded but it was not as comfortable as it looked as at 2–1 Cowdenbeath were still in the game until the 3rd and 4th goals were scored in the final 6 minutes.

A midweek league tie was next on 6 February against Falkirk at Brockville, and in a game where defences were on top it was Falkirk who claimed a 2–0 victory.

On 10 February Dundee was the destination on league business, and in a game which looked destined to finish 0–0 Dundee scored twice in 2 minutes with just 10 minutes left. Davie Wilson's 86th minute counter was not enough to save a point.

With relegation worries prominent, Dumbarton made a double signing on 15 February, with Ross Mathie coming from Kilmarnock and Brian Heron from Motherwell for an estimated total fee of £25,000.

The new signings played in a midweek match against Aberdeen at Pittodrie on 20 February. Aberdeen won 6–0. The club remained in a position for relegation.

It was Scottish Cup fourth round business the following weekend with the visit of Partick Thistle to Boghead. Despite the gift of an own goal in the first minute, Dumbarton had to rely on an 81st-minute goal from Charlie Gallagher to salvage a 2–2 draw.

Four days later the replay took place at Firhill and it was the home team who eased into the next round with a 3–1 win.

The league at the end of February still saw Rangers on top with 39 points, with Celtic just 1 behind with a game in hand, while Dumbarton remained in 16th but only 1 point in front of Kilmarnock.

=== March ===
As Alex Wright officially took over the manager's position, next up on 3 March was Hibernian at Easter Road in the league and the home team made no mistake handing out a 5–0 thrashing.

The midweek game that followed took on great significance as it was against fellow strugglers Airdrie. A win would take Dumbarton out of the relegation places above Kilmarnock. However, the home frailties that had plagued most of the season returned, with Airdrie leaving with both points after a 5–3 victory.

There was a further chance to ease relegation worries with a game against East Fife on 10 March. Dumbaton had all the play but a magnificent performance from the Fifers goalkeeper meant that just a 0–0 draw was achieved.

The next game saw Kilmarnock visit Dumbarton with anything but a win almost closing the door on any chances of survival – but with new signings Mathie and Heron scoring two goals each, Dumbarton produced a superb performance to leapfrog Kilmarnock out of the relegation spots.

On 20 March the league concerns were put to one side as Dumbarton gave a number of the second string players a chance against a strong Falkirk side in the semi-final of the Stirlingshire Cup, eventually coming out on top 2–1 – a young schoolboy signing John Bourke scoring one of the goals.

Four days later Dumbarton were at Cappielow to play Morton in the league and with a brave second half comeback managed to secure a vital point in a 1–1 draw.

The final game of March on the final day of the month brought Rangers to Boghead, who were involved in their own tussle at the top of the league against Celtic. Three goals in the first 22 minutes were enough to see Rangers win the tie 2-1 – but with the effort put in during the second half Dumbarton deserved better.

As the league reached its final stages Rangers unbeaten run since December saw them on 49 points, now 2 ahead of Celtic with a game more played. Dumbarton remained in 16th place with 18 points, now ahead of Kilmarnock on just goal difference.

=== April ===
The first game of April was played against Ayr United on 14 April at Boghead. A Roy McCormack strike in the 13th minute was looking good enough to take both points, but a harmless-looking chip from Ayr substitute Campbell slipped through Willie Whigham's fingers, and Dumbarton had to settle for a point.

The following midweek involved a visit to Celtic Park, and the champions elect were in no mood to take matters easy – brushing Dumbarton aside easily 5–0.

The penultimate league game on 21 April was against Motherwell at Fir Park, and Dumbarton knew that by trailing Kilmarnock by 2 points, something had to be taken from the game. A battling performance resulted in a 2–0 win and kept alive their First Division hopes.

Another midweek game took place on two days later with a game at Boghead against East Stirling in the Stirlingshire Cup final. Tom McAdam was the hero with four goals in a 6–0 rout.

So it was that Dumbarton entered into the final league match on 28 April at Boghead against Dundee United knowing that they had to better any result gained by Kilmarnock. At half time things looked bleak as while Dumbarton led 2–1, Kilmarnock were beating Falkirk 2–0. However, a further two second-half goals, giving Dumbarton a superb 4–1 win, was enough to push Kilmarnock into relegation as they could only manage a 2–2 draw.

At the other end of the table, Celtic won their eighth title in a row, pipping Rangers by a single point.

=== May ===
On 9 May Davie Wilson retired from playing and took up the position of assistant manager at the club.

A number of player milestones were reached during the season. Johnny Graham made his 200th appearance for Dumbarton (on 4 October against Dundee) In addition no fewer than 5 players made their 'century' of appearances in a Dumbarton shirt, as follows:

Laurie Williams v Hearts on 26 August.

Kenny Wilson v Dundee on 20 September.

Peter Coleman v Arbroath on 30 September.

Allan McKay v Arbroath on 20 January.

Jack Bolton v St Johnstone on 27 January.

== Results ==
=== Scottish First Division ===
2 September 1972 Scottish Division 1	Partick Thistle	4–1	Dumbarton	Firhill
	Coulston 4'; Lawrie 27'; Galvin 70', 72'		Gallagher 65' (pen.)	Attendance: 9,000; Referee: B Padden

9 September 1972 Scottish Division 1	Dumbarton	0–0	Falkirk	Boghead Park
				Attendance: 6,000; Referee: D Syme

16 September 1972 Scottish Division 1	Hearts	1–0	Dumbarton	Tynecastle Stadium
	Lynch 23'			Attendance: 7,000; Referee: J R Grant

23 September 1972 Scottish Division 1	Dumbarton	1–2	Aberdeen	Boghead Park
	Wilson, D 31'		Jarvie 49'; Harper 52'	Attendance: 5,000; Referee: R D Henderson

30 September 1972 Scottish Division 1	Dumbarton	0–0	Arbroath	Boghead Park
				Attendance: 3,000; Referee: J W Paterson

7 October 1972 Scottish Division 1	St Johnstone	0–2	Dumbarton	Muirton Park
			McAdam, T 14'; McCormack 52'	Attendance: 3,500; Referee: J Callaghan

14 October 1972 Scottish Division 1	Dumbarton	2–2	Dundee	Boghead Park
	McAdam, T 6'; McCormack 71'		Cushley 46' (o.g.); Wallace 69'	Attendance: 4,000; Referee: E H Pringle

21 October 1972 Scottish Division 1	Airdrie	2–3	Dumbarton	Broomfield Park
	Busby 41', 80'		McCormack 44', 79'; McAdam, T 87'	Attendance: 4,500; Referee: J Callaghan

28 October 1972 Scottish Division 1	Dumbarton	2–2	Hibernian	Boghead Park
	McAdam, T 59'; Wallace 73'		Duncan 4'; Gordon 87'	Attendance: 4,000; Referee: E H Pringle

4 November 1972 Scottish Division 1	East Fife	2–1	Dumbarton	Bayview Park, Methil
	Hegarty 26' mcPhee 54'		McAdam, T 87'	Attendance: 3,000; Referee: R Marshall

11 November 1972 Scottish Division 1	Kilmarnock	2–2	Dumbarton	Rugby Park
	Morrison 46'; Cook 47'		McCormack 56'; McAdam, T 74'	Attendance: 2,500; Referee: T Kellock

18 November 1972 Scottish Division 1	Dumbarton	2–2	Morton	Boghead Park
	McAdam, T 35', 70'		Gillies 62'; Anderson 81'	Attendance: 5,000; Referee: C H Hutton

11 November 1972 Scottish Division 1	Rangers	3–1	Dumbarton	Ibrox Park
	Young 41'; Conn 70'; Parlane 80'		McCormack 59'	Attendance: 12,000; Referee: B Padden

2 December 1972 Scottish Division 1	Dumbarton	1–6	Celtic	Boghead Park
	Wallace 84'		Hood 4'; McCluskey 15', 36', 78'; Johnstone 23'; Cushley 74' (o.g.)	Attendance: 15,000; Referee: A F McDonald

9 December 1972 Scottish Division 1	Ayr United	2–0	Dumbarton	Somerset Park
	McCulloch 8'; Ingram 48'			Attendance: 4,500; Referee: R C Greenlees

16 December 1972 Scottish Division 1	Dumbarton	0–0	Motherwell	Boghead Park
				Attendance: 3,000; Referee: W Anderson

23 December 1972 Scottish Division 1	Dundee United	3–2	Dumbarton	Tannadice Park
	Gardner 16'; Rolland 50'; Smith 85' (pen.)		Markland 28' (o.g.); McAlpine 42' (o.g.)	Attendance: 3,500; Referee: J R Grant

30 December 1972 Scottish Division 1	Dumbarton	4–2	Partick Thistle	Boghead Park
	Wallace 30', 60'; McCormack 72'; Graham 87'		McQuade 35'; Craig 39'	Attendance: 5,000; Referee: R H Davidson

6 January 1973 Scottish Division 1	Dumbarton	0–2	Hearts	Boghead Park
			Renton 13'; Menmuir 87'	Attendance: 4,500; Referee: A Paterson

20 January 1973 Scottish Division 1	Arbroath	2–1	Dumbarton	Gayfield Park
	Pirie 59'; Payne 63'		Wallace 90'	Attendance: 1,771; Referee: J W Paterson

27 January 1973 Scottish Division 1	Dumbarton	1–1	St Johnstone	Boghead Park
	Kidd 10'		Hall 38'	Attendance: 3,500; Referee: E H Pringle

6 February 1973 Scottish Division 1	Falkirk	2–0	Dumbarton	Brockville Park
	Somner 41', 85'			Attendance: 4,000; Referee: J McRoberts

10 February 1973 Scottish Division 1	Dundee	2–1	Dumbarton	Dens Park
	Scott 82'; Wallace 84'		Wilson 86'	Attendance: 4,500; Referee: E Thomson

20 February 1973 Scottish Division 1	Aberdeen	6–0	Dumbarton	Pittodrie Park
	Purdie 9', 66'; Forrest 35'; Jenkins 67' (o.g.); Varga 80'; Jarvie 89'			Attendance: 8,000; Referee: R C Greenlees

3 March 1973 Scottish Division 1	Hibernian	5–0	Dumbarton	Easter Road
	Gordon 20'; Duncan 31'; Cropley 43', 55'; Hamilton 49'			Attendance: 12,417; Referee: J M D Foote

7 March 1973 Scottish Division 1	Dumbarton	3–5	Airdrie	Boghead Park
	Mathie 15', 53' mcCormack 85'		Hulston 27'; Walker 35'; Busby 36', 61', 86'	Attendance: 3,000; Referee: J Callaghan

10 March 1973 Scottish Division 1	Dumbarton	0–0	East Fife	Boghead Park
				Attendance: 3,500; Referee: A K McCririck

17 March 1973 Scottish Division 1	Dumbarton	4–2	Kilmarnock	Boghead Park
	Mathie 7', 88'; Heron 63', 71'		McSherry 43'; Morrison 44'	Attendance: 4,000; Referee: T R Kyle

24 March 1973 Scottish Division 1	Morton	1–1	Dumbarton	Cappielow Park
	Osborne 25'		McCormack 63'	Attendance: 4,500; Referee: R Gordon

31 March 1973 Scottish Division 1	Dumbarton	1–2	Rangers	Boghead Park
	Mathie 22'		Young 13'; Parlane 20'	Attendance: 13,000; Referee: J W Paterson

14 April 1973 Scottish Division 1	Dumbarton	1–1	Ayr United	Boghead Park
	McCormack 13'		Campbell 53'	Attendance: 4,000; Referee: A McKenzie

19 April 1973 Scottish Division 1	Celtic	5–0	Dumbarton	Celtic Park
	Deans 12', 69', 84'; Callaghan 20'; Dalgleish 38'			Attendance: 27,000; Referee: T Marshall

21 April 1973 Scottish Division 1	Motherwell	0–2	Dumbarton	Fir Park
			Mathie 53'; McCormack 88'	Attendance: 3,000; Referee: D F T Syme

28 April 1973 Scottish Division 1	Dumbarton	4–1	Dundee United	Boghead Park
	Wallace 29'; Mathie 42'; McAdam, T 62', 72'		Fleming 11'	Attendance: 6,000; Referee: T Kellock

=== Scottish Cup ===
2 February 1973 Cup round 3	Dumbarton	4–1	Cowdenbeath	Boghead Park
	Wallace 29'; McAdam 60'; Mackay 84'; Graham 89'		Ross 67'	Attendance: 3,539; Referee: W Anderson

24 February 1973 Cup round 4	Dumbarton	2–2	Partick Thistle	Boghead Park
	Hansen 1' (o.g.); Gallacher 81'		Lawrie 46'; Wilkinson 52' (o.g.)	Attendance: 7,875; Referee: E Thomson

28 February 1973 Cup round 4R	Partick Thistle	3–1	Dumbarton	Firhill Park
	Galvin 10', 79' (pen.); Craig 51'		Gallacher 56' (pen.)	Attendance: 8,796; Referee: E Thomson

=== Scottish League Cup ===
11 August 1972 Group 6	Dumbarton	1–0	Hearts	Boghead Park
	McCormack 75'			Attendance: 7,000; Referee: B Padden

16 August 1972 Group 6	Berwick Rangers	1–0	Dumbarton	Shielfield Park
	Hall 75'			Attendance: 500; Referee: G B Smith

19 August 1972 Group 6	Dumbarton	4–1	Airdrie	Boghead Park
	Wilson, K 40', 84'; Kidd 60'; Gallacher 74'		Busby 90'	Attendance: 4,000; Referee: I M D Foote

23 August 1972 Group 6	Dumbarton	2–2	Berwick Rangers	Boghead Park
	Gallacher 75', 89' (pen.)		Coyne 25', 44'	Attendance: 1,000; Referee: J Callaghan

26 August 1972 Group 6	Hearts	1–1	Dumbarton	Tynecastle Stadium
	Murray 18'		Jenkins 62'	Attendance: 8,000; Referee: R Marshall

30 August 1972 Group 6	Airdrie	2–1	Dumbarton	Broomfield Park
	Fury 9'; Whiteford 36'		Kidd 46'	Attendance: 5,000; Referee: A R McCririck

20 September 1972 Round 2(1)	Dumbarton	3–0	Dundee	Boghead Park
	Graham 28'; Wilson, D 33'; Wilson, K 78'			Attendance: 4,000; Referee: W Anderson

4 October 1972 Round 2(2)	Dundee	4–0	Dumbarton	Dens Park
	Scott 37'; Wallace 50', 72'; Duncan 85'			Attendance: 9,000; Referee: W Anderson

=== Drybrough Cup ===
29 July 1972 Quarter-final	Celtic	2–1	Dumbarton	Celtic Park
	Callaghan 3'; McNeill 52'		Wilson, K 34'	Attendance: 28,000; Referee: E H Pringle

=== Stirlingshire Cup ===
31 October 1972 First round	Dumbarton	4–2	Alloa Athletic	Boghead Park
	McCormack 7'; Graham 25'; Coleman 59'; McAdam,T 80'		Low 2'; McCulloch 88' (pen.)	Attendance: 700; Referee: R Marshall

20 March 1973 Semi-final	Dumbarton	2–1	Falkirk	Boghead Park
	Kidd 40'; Bourke 65'		Cushley 83' (o.g.)

23 April 1973 Final	Dumbarton	6–0	East Stirling	Boghead Park
	McAdam, T 10', 58', 67', 89'; Wallace 50'; Simpson 77' (o.g.)			Referee: A Webster

=== Friendly ===
7 August 1972 Friendly	Dumbarton	3–2	(England) Carlisle United	Boghead Park
	Gallacher 52' (pen.), 60'; Wilson, K 67'		Martin 6'; Owen 75'	Attendance: 5,000

== Player statistics ==
=== Squad ===
No.	Pos	Nat	Player	Total		First Division		Scottish Cup		League Cup		Drybrough Cup	
No.	Pos	Nat	Player	Apps	Goals	Apps	Goals	Apps	Goals	Apps	Goals	Apps	Goals
	GK	(Scotland) SCO	Bruce Livingstone	1	0	1	0	0	0	0	0	0	0
	GK	(Scotland) SCO	Willie Whigham	8	0	6	0	0	0	1	0	1	0
	GK	(Scotland) SCO	Laurie Williams	36	0	26	0	3	0	7	0	0	0
	DF	(Scotland) SCO	Colin McAdam	6	0	6	0	0	0	0	0	0	0
	DF	(Scotland) SCO	Allan McKay	15	1	11	0	3	1	1	0	0	0
	DF	(Scotland) SCO	Billy Wilkinson	42	0	30	0	3	0	8	0	1	0
	MF	(Scotland) SCO	Jack Bolton	37	0	27	0	1	0	8	0	1	0
	MF	(Scotland) SCO	John Cushley	37	0	28	0	3	0	5	0	1	0
	MF	(Scotland) SCO	Johnny Graham	45	3	33	1	3	1	8	1	1	0
	MF	(Scotland) SCO	Kenny Jenkins	34	1	23	0	2	0	8	1	1	0
	MF	(Scotland) SCO	Gordon Menzies	33	0	28+1	0	0	0	3	0	0+1	0
	MF	(Scotland) SCO	Denis Ruddy	3	0	0+1	0	0	0	2	0	0	0
	FW	(Scotland) SCO	Peter Coleman	35	0	21+4	0	2+1	0	6	0	1	0
	FW	(Scotland) SCO	Iain Fearn	2	0	0	0	0	0	2	0	0	0
	FW	(Scotland) SCO	Charlie Gallagher	16	6	6	1	3	2	5+1	3	1	0
	FW	(Scotland) SCO	Brian Heron	10	2	9+1	2	0	0	0	0	0	0
	FW	(Scotland) SCO	Ronnie Kidd	8	3	3+2	1	0	0	2+1	2	0	0
	FW	(Scotland) SCO	Ross Mathie	11	6	10+1	6	0	0	0	0	0	0
	FW	(Scotland) SCO	Tom McAdam	20	11	14+2	10	2+1	1	0+1	0	0	0
	FW	(Scotland) SCO	Roy McCormack	41	12	32	11	2	0	6	1	1	0
	FW	(Scotland) SCO	John Paterson	4	0	0+3	0	0	0	1	0	0	0
	FW	(Scotland) SCO	Willie Wallace	29	7	24+2	6	3	1	0	0	0	0
	FW	(Scotland) SCO	Davie Wilson	46	3	31+3	2	3	0	8	1	1	0
	FW	(Scotland) SCO	Kenny Wilson	12	4	4	0	0	0	7	3	1	1

=== Transfers ===
==== Players in ====
Player	From	Date
(Scotland) John Cushley	(Scotland) Dunfermline Ath	29 Jun 1972
(Scotland) Denis Ruddy	(Scotland) Clydebank	30 Jun 1972
(Scotland) Willie Whigham	(England) Middlesbrough	17 Jul 1972
(Scotland) Willie Wallace	(England) Crystal Palace	10 Oct 1972
(Scotland) John Bourke	(Scotland) Dumbarton United	11 Jan 1973
(Scotland) Brian Heron	(Scotland) Motherwell	15 Feb 1973
(Scotland) Ross Mathie	(Scotland) Kilmarnock	15 Feb 1973

==== Players out ====
Player	To	Date
(Scotland) Brian Gallagher	(Scotland) Beith	7 Aug 1972
(Scotland) Kenny Wilson	(England) Carlisle Utd	26 Sep 1972
(Scotland) Charlie Gallagher	(Scotland) Retired	30 Apr 1973
(Scotland) Jack Bolton	(Scotland) Freed	30 Apr 1973
(Scotland) Davie Wilson	(Scotland) Assistant Manager	7 May 1973

== Reserve team ==
Dumbarton competed in the Scottish Reserve League, and with 9 wins and 10 draws from 34 matches, finished 12th of 18.

For the first time in a decade, Dumbarton also entered the Scottish Second XI Cup, and reached the third round before losing out to Dundee by the only goal.
