= 1976–77 Dumbarton F.C. season =

Dumbarton
1976–1977 season
- Manager: Alex Wright
- Stadium: Boghead Park, Dumbarton
- Scottish League Division 1: 7th
- Scottish Cup: Third Round
- Scottish League Cup: Prelims
- Top goalscorer: League: John Bourke (19); All: John Bourke (22)
- Highest home attendance: 4000
- Lowest home attendance: 500
- Average home league attendance: 1450

Season 1976–77 was the 93rd football season in which Dumbarton competed at a Scottish national level, entering the Scottish Football League for the 71st time, the Scottish Cup for the 82nd time and the Scottish League Cup for the 30th time.

== Overview ==
Dumbarton played for the second successive season in Division 1, but with the Spring Cup being dispensed with, the league programme was extended by each team playing the other 3 times. Facing the unlucky ballot of two away trips to newly relegated Dundee, as well what proved to be the division's top two teams, St Mirren and Clydebank, provided an immediate disadvantage.

Once again a poor start was to scupper Dumbarton's promotion ambitions. On this occasion the transfer of future £1m player Ian Wallace to Coventry City immediately following a 3–3 home draw with Celtic in the season-opening League Cup sections proved a disruptive loss as only a single win was gained from the first 6 league games. Although this was immediately followed by a seven-game unbeaten run, and there was another unbeaten run of five games from the end of November until the end of January, thereafter results were without any level of consistency - something which almost led to manager Alex Wright resigning in February - although a mid-table 7th place was achieved in the end.

In the Scottish Cup it was once again Hearts who were to end any thoughts of a cup run for Dumbarton, losing in a third round replay by the only goal, after a 1-1 drawn game at Tynecastle Park.

In the League Cup, another tough qualifying group, which included two of the top-four Premier Division clubs, Celtic (again) and Dundee United, was to prove to be too much of a hurdle to progress to the knock-out stages. However, 2 wins and 2 draws from the 6 ties (including the 3–3 home draw with Celtic after leading 3–1 at half-time, and a 1–1 draw away to Dundee United) was a creditable achievement for a second-tier side.

Locally, in the Stirlingshire Cup, Dumbarton were defeated by Alloa Athletic in the first round.

Elsewhere during the pre-season a short tour of Spain was undertaken.

== Results & fixtures ==
Win Draw Loss

=== Scottish First Division ===
4 September 1976 Scottish Division 1	Dundee	2–1	Dumbarton	Dens Park
	Hutchinson 10'; Pirie 53'		Muir 61'	Attendance: 4,619; Referee: M Delaney

8 September 1976 Scottish Division 1	Arbroath	1–0	Dumbarton	Gayfield Park
	Fletcher 18'			Attendance: 753; Referee: E Pringle

11 September 1976 Scottish Division 1	Dumbarton	2–1	Montrose	Boghead Park
	Bourke 72', 76'		Lowe 86'	Attendance: 1,000; Referee: A ferguson

14 September 1976 Scottish Division 1	Dumbarton	1–3	Airdrie	Boghead Park
	Bourke 5'		McCulloch 2'; Clark 59'; Whiteford 80'	Attendance: 1,200

18 September 1976 Scottish Division 1	St Mirren	2–1	Dumbarton	Love Street (stadium)
	McDowall 11'; McKinlay 71' (o.g.)		Bourke 8'	Attendance: 2,500; Referee: J Gordon

25 September 1976 Scottish Division 1	Dumbarton	1–2	Hamilton	Boghead Park
	Brown, A 68'		McGrogan 40'; Lynch 62'	Attendance: 1,500; Referee: R Hopkins

29 September 1976 Scottish Division 1	East Fife	2–3	Dumbarton	Bayview Park, Methil
	O'Connor 27'; Young 67'		Brown, A 2'; Muir 20'; Steele 62'	Attendance: 784

2 October 1976 Scottish Division 1	Raith Rovers	1–1	Dumbarton	Starks Park
	Urquhart 62' (pen.)		Muir 56'	Attendance: 1,553; Referee: K Hope

5 October 1976 Scottish Division 1	Dumbarton	5–1	East Fife	Boghead Park
	Muir 10', 51', 75'; Steele 16'; Bourke 20'		Law 1'	Attendance: 1,000; Referee: H Alexander

9 October 1976 Scottish Division 1	Dumbarton	1–1	Morton	Boghead Park
	Bourke 50'		Brown 44'	Attendance: 2,000; Referee: A McFaull

16 October 1976 Scottish Division 1	St Johnstone	1–2	Dumbarton	Muirton Park
	McKay		Bourke 73', 82'	Attendance: 2,000; Referee: J Renton

20 October 1976 Scottish Division 1	Dumbarton	2–2	Falkirk	Boghead Park
	McLean 16'; Bourke 18'		Ford 30', 70' (pen.)	Attendance: 2,000; Referee: A McFaull

23 October 1976 Scottish Division 1	Dumbarton	3–3	Queen of the South	Boghead Park
	McLean 11'; Bourke 76'; Brown, A 86'		Dickson 69', 73'; McKinlay 84' (o.g.)	Attendance: 1,505; Referee: K Stewart

30 October 1976 Scottish Division 1	Clydebank	2–0	Dumbarton	Kilbowie Park
	McCallan 80'; Lumsden 90' (pen.)			Attendance: 7,000; Referee: G Smith

10 November 1976 Scottish Division 1	Dumbarton	1–1	Dundee	Boghead Park
	Harvey 79'		Hutchinson 9'	Attendance: 500; Referee: D Murdoch

13 November 1976 Scottish Division 1	Montrose	2–1	Dumbarton	Links Park
	Low 16'; Street 84'		Harvey 61'	Attendance: 1,000; Referee: M Delaney

20 November 1976 Scottish Division 1	Dumbarton	0–1	St Mirren	Boghead Park
			Torrance 76'	Attendance: 4,000; Referee: E Pringle

27 November 1976 Scottish Division 1	Hamilton	0–1	Dumbarton	Douglas Park
			Whiteford 84'	Attendance: 1,200; Referee: E Thomson

27 December 1976 Scottish Division 1	Queen of the South	1–2	Dumbarton	Palmerston Park
	Dempster		McLean; MacLeod	Attendance: 2,500; Referee: K Hope

1 January 1977 Scottish Division 1	Dumbarton	1–1	Clydebank	Boghead Park
	Brown, A 74'		Larnach 36'	Attendance: 4,000; Referee: T Muirhead

8 January 1977 Scottish Division 1	Dumbarton	2–2	Montrose	Boghead Park
	Whiteford 44' (pen.), 88'		Brown 61'; Stewart 76'	Attendance: 2,000; Referee: M Delaney

22 January 1977 Scottish Division 1	Dumbarton	1–1	Hamilton	Boghead Park
	Whiteford 87'		Lawson 44'	Attendance: 1,500; Referee: H Alexander

5 February 1977 Scottish Division 1	Raith Rovers	3–1	Dumbarton	Starks Park
	Harrow 15'; Brown, J 51'; Cooper 55'		Brown, A 29'	Attendance: 1,613; Referee: J Gordon

7 February 1977 Scottish Division 1	St Mirren	3–2	Dumbarton	Love Street (stadium)
	Reid 19'; Hyslop 24'; Torrance 49' (pen.)		Graham 21'; Bourke 46'	Attendance: 7,800; Referee: I Foote

12 February 1977 Scottish Division 1	Dumbarton	0–4	Morton	Boghead Park
			Anderson 19'; McGhee 46'; Morrison 47'; Goldthorpe 89'	Attendance: 1,000; Referee: I Foote

19 February 1977 Scottish Division 1	St Johnstone	0–2	Dumbarton	Muirton Park
			Bourke 80', 89'	Attendance: 1,497; Referee: A Ferguson

23 February 1977 Scottish Division 1	Dumbarton	2–0	Raith Rovers	Boghead Park
	Whiteford 22'; Bourke 58'			Attendance: 800; Referee: R Cuthill

26 February 1977 Scottish Division 1	Morton	3–0	Dumbarton	Cappielow Park
	McGhee 49', 69'; Goldthorp 90'			Attendance: 2,000; Referee: W Anderson

5 March 1977 Scottish Division 1	Dumbarton	2–0	Queen of the South	Boghead Park
	Whiteford 41'; Muir 46'			Attendance: 1,000; Referee: E Pringle

12 March 1977 Scottish Division 1	Clydebank	4–2	Dumbarton	Kilbowie Park
	McCallan 6'; Houston 27', 65'; Larnach 77'		Bourke 41'; Whiteford 74'	Attendance: 4,000; Referee: D Murdoch

19 March 1977 Scottish Division 1	Dumbarton	2–1	Airdrie	Boghead Park
	Bourke 71'; Whiteford 73'		McVeigh 67'	Attendance: 1,000; Referee: R Valentine

23 March 1977 Scottish Division 1	Dundee	4–0	Dumbarton	Dens Park
	Pirie 19', 33', 35', 62'			Attendance: 2,401; Referee: A Ferguson

26 March 1977 Scottish Division 1	Airdrie	1–2	Dumbarton	Broomfield Park
	McVeigh 30'		Whiteford 48'; Bourke 80'	Attendance: 2,000; Referee: J Gordon

2 April 1977 Scottish Division 1	Falkirk	1–3	Dumbarton	Brockville Park
	Wilson 56' (pen.)		Whiteford 12' (pen.), 41'; MacLeod 69'	Attendance: 1,000; Referee: T Kellock

6 April 1977 Scottish Division 1	Dumbarton	2–4	St Johnstone	Boghead Park
	Whiteford 24' (pen.), 35'		O'Connor 2'; Anderson 55'; Brogan 77', 81'	Attendance: 1,000; Referee: A Downie

9 April 1977 Scottish Division 1	Dumbarton	4–0	Falkirk	Boghead Park
	MacLeod 23', 39'; Whiteford; Muir			Attendance: 1,000; Referee: W Anderson

16 April 1977 Scottish Division 1	Dumbarton	2–3	Arbroath	Boghead Park
	MacLeod 4'; Bourke 66'		Yule 56'; Rylance 71'; Bone 84'	Attendance: 1,000; Referee: K Hope

23 April 1977 Scottish Division 1	Arbroath	1–2	Dumbarton	Gayfield Park
	Yule		Wells (o.g.); MacLeod	Attendance: 957; Referee: M Delaney

30 April 1977 Scottish Division 1	Dumbarton	3–3	East Fife	Boghead Park
	McLean 27'; MacLeod 39'; Bourke 85'		Clarke 15' (pen.); Gillies 69'; Huskie 80'	Attendance: 2,000; Referee: A McGunnigle

=== Scottish Cup ===
29 January 1977 Scottish Cup round 3	Hearts	1–1	Dumbarton	Tynecastle Stadium
	Callachen 7'		Bourke 87'	Attendance: 7,969; Referee: R Valentine

2 February 1977 Scottish Cup round 3R	Dumbarton	0–1	Hearts	Boghead Park
			Gibson 112'	Attendance: 4,000; Referee: R Valentine

=== Scottish League Cup ===
14 August 1975 Section 3	Dumbarton	2–0	Arbroath	Boghead Park
	Wallace 52'; Sinclair 69'			Attendance: 1,500; Referee: I Foote

18 August 1975 Section 3	Celtic	3–0	Dumbarton	Celtic Park
	Doyle 25'; Dalglish 80' (pen.), 88' (pen.)			Attendance: 15,000; Referee: J Downie

21 August 1975 Section 3	Dumbarton	1–2	Dundee United	Boghead Park
	Wallace 9'		Reid 69'; Hegarty 84'	Attendance: 2,500; Referee: A McGunnigle

25 August 1975 Section 3	Dumbarton	3–3	Celtic	Boghead Park
	Bourke 8', 24'; Wallace 34'		Wilson 14'; McDonald 61'; Doyle 84'	Attendance: 12,000; Referee: E Thomson

28 August 1975 Section 3	Dundee United	1–1	Dumbarton	Tannadice Park
	McAdam 42'		Muir 56'	Attendance: 4,000; Referee: I Foote

1 September 1975 Section 3	Arbroath	0–3	Dumbarton	Gayfield Park
			Muir 19'; Mullen 52'; MacLeod 58'	Attendance: 810; Referee: R Cuthill

=== Stirlingshire Cup ===
15 November 1976 1st Round	Dumbarton	2–4	Alloa Athletic	Boghead Park
	Steele 30'; Brown, A 49'		Muir 19'; Wilson 33'; Forrest 54'; McCabe 78'	Attendance: 500; Referee: A McGunnigle

=== Pre-season Matches ===
27 July 1976 Friendly	Vale of Leven	2–5	Dumbarton	Millburn Park
	Brewerton; McCourt		(o.g.); Wallace; Mulraine; MacLeod

3 August 1976 Friendly	(Spain) Lloret	1–6	Dumbarton	Lloret de Mar
	Goal		Wallace 3'; Mulr; Sinclair; Harvey

4 August 1976 Friendly	(Spain) Malgrat	2–3	Dumbarton	Malgrat de Mar
	Goal		Wallace; Smith; Harvey

11 August 1976 Friendly	Dumbarton	3–2	Rangers	Boghead Park
	Wallace 13', 69'; Muir 25'		McDougall 39'; Henderson 58'

== League table ==
Pos	Team	Pld	W	D	L	GF	GA	GD	Pts
5	Montrose	39	16	9	14	61	62	−1	41
6	Airdrieonians	39	13	12	14	63	58	+5	38
7	Dumbarton	39	14	9	16	63	68	−5	37
8	Arbroath	39	17	3	19	46	62	−16	37
9	Queen of the South	39	11	13	15	58	65	−7	35

Source: RSSSF and statto
Rules for classification: 1) points; 2) goal difference; 3) number of goals scored.

== Player statistics ==
=== Squad ===
No.	Pos	Nat	Player	Total		First Division		Scottish Cup		League Cup	
No.	Pos	Nat	Player	Apps	Goals	Apps	Goals	Apps	Goals	Apps	Goals
	GK	(Scotland) SCO	Ian McGregor	1	0	1	0	0	0	0	0
	GK	(Scotland) SCO	Laurie Williams	46	0	38	0	2	0	6	0
	DF	(Scotland) SCO	Terry Mullen	4	1	0+1	0	0	0	0+3	1
	DF	(Scotland) SCO	Willie Russell	2	0	2	0	0	0	0	0
	DF	(Scotland) SCO	Don Watt	36	0	28	0	2	0	6	0
	MF	(Scotland) SCO	Brian Brown	4	0	3+1	0	0	0	0	0
	MF	(Scotland) SCO	Johnny Graham	42	1	33+1	1	1+1	0	6	0
	MF	(Scotland) SCO	Columb McKinley	33	0	27+1	0	2	0	2+1	0
	MF	(Scotland) SCO	Hugh McLean	37	4	22+8	4	2	0	3+2	0
	MF	(Scotland) SCO	Donald McNeil	27	0	14+8	0	0+2	0	3	0
	MF	(Scotland) SCO	Martin Mowat	10	0	10	0	0	0	0	0
	MF	(Scotland) SCO	Jim Muir	35	10	26+1	8	2	0	6	2
	MF	(Scotland) SCO	Graeme Sinclair	46	1	38	0	2	0	6	1
	MF	(Scotland) SCO	Walter Smith	35	0	26+1	0	2	0	6	0
	FW	(Scotland) SCO	Raymond Blair	13	0	11+2	0	0	0	0	0
	FW	(Scotland) SCO	John Bourke	42	22	36	19	2	1	4	2
	FW	(Scotland) SCO	Ally Brown	42	5	29+6	5	2	0	5	0
	FW	(Scotland) SCO	Jim Cook	16	0	12+1	0	0	0	3	0
	FW	(Scotland) SCO	Jim Donaldson	2	0	0+2	0	0	0	0	0
	FW	(Scotland) SCO	Drew Harvey	12	2	4+5	2	1+1	0	1	0
	FW	(Scotland) SCO	Bobby McCallum	16	0	10+4	0	0	0	1+1	0
	FW	(Scotland) SCO	Murdo MacLeod	33	8	25+5	7	0	0	3	1
	FW	(Scotland) SCO	Tommy Mulraine	5	0	2+2	0	0	0	1	0
	FW	(Scotland) SCO	Billy Steele	20	2	16+4	2	0	0	0	0
	FW	(Scotland) SCO	Ian Wallace	4	3	0	0	0	0	4	3
	FW	(Scotland) SCO	Jocky Whiteford	21	15	19	15	2	0	0	0

=== International Caps ===
Graeme Sinclair was selected to play for Scotland Under23s in a match against England Under23s on April 27, 1977. The tie - which was part of the unofficial under23 British Home International Championship - was won by England 1–0. This was the first Dumbarton internationalist, of any sort, for over 15 years.

=== Transfers ===
==== Players in ====
Player	From	Date
(Scotland) Raymond Blair	(Scotland) Dunipace Juv	13 May 1976
(Scotland) Willie Russell	(Scotland) Eastercraigs	13 May 1976
(Scotland) Jim Donaldson	(Scotland) Eastercraigs	15 May 1976
(Scotland) Tommy Mulraine	(Scotland) Arthurlie	19 Jul 1976
(Scotland) Billy Steele	(Scotland) Dundee United	24 Sep 1976
(Scotland) Jocky Whiteford	(Scotland) Falkirk	25 Nov 1976
(Scotland) Ally McLeod	(Scotland) Douglas Acad	17 Dec 1976
(Scotland) Joe Coyle	(Scotland) Shettleston	31 Jan 1977
(Scotland) Bobby McCallum	(Scotland) Lanark United	29 Apr 1977

==== Players out ====
Player	To	Date
(Scotland) George Kane	(Scotland) Baillieston	10 Jun 1976
(Scotland) Peter Coleman	(Scotland) Petershill	20 Jun 1976
(Scotland) Alan Bennett	(Scotland) East Stirling	26 Jul 1976
(Scotland) Ian Wallace	(England) Coventry City	31 Aug 1976
(Scotland) Jim Cook	(Scotland) Falkirk	25 Nov 1976
(Scotland) Terry Mullen	(Scotland) Falkirk	17 Dec 1976
(Scotland) Walter Smith	(Scotland) Dundee United	27 Feb 1977
(Scotland) Jim Brown	(Scotland) Retired	

== Reserve team ==
Dumbarton competed in the Scottish Reserve League and finished 9th of 18 with 14 wins and 6 draws from 34 matches.

In the Scottish Second XI Cup, Dumbarton lost to Queen of the South in the second round, on penalties, after a 2–2 draw.

In the Scottish Reserve League Cup, Dumbarton failed to qualifying from their section.

== Trivia ==
- Johnny Graham set two records during the season. His appearance in the League match against Montrose on 13 November was his 365th competitive match for the club - overtaking Andy Jardine's record set a decade earlier - and in what was to be his final match for Dumbarton, his appearance in the League match against East Fife on 30 April was his 385th competitive match for the club - setting a new club record - which still stands.
- The fee of £80,000 for Ian Wallace's transfer to Coventry City at the end of August set a new record.
- Despite only a 7th place in the league, John Bourke finished as the First Division's top scorer.
- At the end of the season Alex Wright gave up his managerial duties to accept a directorship and was replaced by his assistant manager Davie Wilson.

== See also ==
- 1976–77 in Scottish football
