= 1973–74 Scottish Football League =

Scottish football season

Statistics of Scottish Football League in season 1973–74.

== Scottish League Division One ==
Scottish Division One
- Season: 1973–74
- Champions: Celtic; 29th title
- Relegated: East Fife; Falkirk

The 1973–74 Scottish Division One was won by Celtic by four points over nearest rival Hibernian. East Fife and Falkirk finished 17th and 18th respectively and were relegated to the 1974–75 Second Division.

This was Celtic's ninth title in a row, a record that would be equalled by Rangers in the 1996–97 season and again by Celtic themselves in 2019–20.

== Table ==
Pos	Team	Pld	W	D	L	GF	GA	GD	Pts	Qualification or relegation
1	Celtic	34	23	7	4	82	27	+55	53	Champion
2	Hibernian	34	20	9	5	75	42	+33	49	
3	Rangers	34	21	6	7	67	34	+33	48	
4	Aberdeen	34	13	16	5	46	26	+20	42	
5	Dundee	34	16	7	11	67	48	+19	39	
6	Heart of Midlothian	34	14	10	10	54	43	+11	38	
7	Ayr United	34	15	8	11	44	40	+4	38	
8	Dundee United	34	15	7	12	55	51	+4	37	1974–75 European Cup Winners' Cup First round
9	Motherwell	34	14	7	13	45	40	+5	35	
10	Dumbarton	34	11	7	16	43	58	−15	29	
11	Partick Thistle	34	9	10	15	33	46	−13	28	
12	St Johnstone	34	9	10	15	41	60	−19	28	
13	Arbroath	34	10	7	17	52	69	−17	27	
14	Morton	34	8	10	16	37	49	−12	26	
15	Clyde	34	8	9	17	29	65	−36	25	
16	Dunfermline Athletic	34	8	8	18	43	65	−22	24	
17	East Fife	34	9	6	19	26	51	−25	24	Relegated to 1974–75 Second Division
18	Falkirk	34	4	14	16	33	58	−25	22	Relegated to 1974–75 Second Division

Source: Soccerbase and League Tables

== Results ==
Home \ Away	ABE	ARB	AYR	CEL	CLY	DUM	DND	DNU	DNF	EFI	FAL	HOM	HIB	MOR	MOT	PAR	RAN	STJ
Aberdeen		2–2	2–1	0–0	1–1	3–0	0–0	3–1	0–0	2–0	6–0	3–1	1–1	0–0	0–0	2–0	1–1	0–1
Arbroath	1–3		1–1	1–2	1–2	2–1	2–4	1–2	3–1	1–2	0–0	2–3	3–2	2–1	0–2	0–3	1–2	3–1
Ayr United	0–0	1–2		0–1	2–2	0–1	4–2	1–1	3–1	1–0	1–0	2–1	1–1	2–1	1–0	1–0	0–1	3–2
Celtic	2–0	1–0	4–0		5–0	3–3	1–2	3–3	6–0	4–2	6–0	1–0	1–1	1–1	2–0	7–0	1–0	3–0
Clyde	1–3	3–2	1–3	0–2		0–3	0–2	1–2	1–0	2–0	0–0	2–0	1–1	0–2	0–3	1–0	0–2	0–1
Dumbarton	0–1	5–2	0–2	0–2	1–1		2–0	1–2	1–0	1–1	1–5	0–1	3–3	1–0	3–0	2–0	0–2	2–1
Dundee	1–1	5–2	2–1	0–1	6–1	2–1		0–1	1–5	0–1	4–0	0–0	1–3	2–1	0–1	4–1	2–3	2–2
Dundee United	0–3	3–1	2–1	0–2	4–0	6–0	1–2		0–1	0–0	2–1	3–3	1–4	4–2	0–1	1–1	1–3	2–0
Dunfermline Athletic	0–0	1–1	0–4	2–3	2–3	3–2	1–5	2–3		0–1	4–0	2–3	2–3	1–1	2–4	1–1	2–2	3–1
East Fife	2–2	0–2	0–1	1–6	1–0	0–1	0–3	0–2	0–1		1–2	0–0	0–3	0–1	1–0	2–1	0–3	1–2
Falkirk	1–3	2–2	1–1	1–1	3–0	2–3	3–3	0–1	0–1	1–1		0–2	0–0	1–1	1–1	0–0	0–0	1–1
Heart of Midlothian	0–0	4–0	0–1	1–3	0–0	0–0	2–2	1–1	3–0	2–2	2–1		4–1	0–2	2–0	3–1	2–4	0–2
Hibernian	3–1	2–1	4–2	2–4	5–0	3–0	2–1	3–1	1–1	2–1	2–0	3–1		5–0	1–0	2–1	3–1	3–3
Morton	2–0	1–1	1–2	0–0	2–2	3–1	0–1	0–2	1–2	1–0	0–3	2–3	0–3		4–3	0–0	2–3	1–1
Motherwell	0–0	3–4	2–0	3–2	0–0	2–0	2–2	4–0	1–0	3–1	2–1	2–2	1–1	1–0		1–2	1–4	0–1
Partick Thistle	2–0	2–3	3–0	2–0	1–3	0–0	1–0	2–1	1–1	0–1	2–2	1–3	1–0	0–0	1–0		0–1	0–1
Rangers	1–1	2–3	0–0	0–1	4–0	3–1	1–2	3–1	3–0	0–1	2–1	0–3	4–0	1–0	2–1	1–1		5–1
St Johnstone	1–2	0–0	1–1	2–1	1–1	3–3	1–4	1–1	3–1	1–3	2–0	0–2	0–2	1–4	0–1	2–2	1–3	

Legend: Blue = home team win; Yellow = draw; Red = away team win.

== Scottish League Division Two ==
Pos	Team	Pld	W	D	L	GF	GA	GD	Pts	Promotion or relegation
1	Airdrieonians	36	28	4	4	102	25	+77	60	Promotion to the 1974–75 First Division
2	Kilmarnock	36	26	6	4	96	44	+52	58	Promotion to the 1974–75 First Division
3	Hamilton Academical	36	24	7	5	68	38	+30	55	
4	Queen of the South	36	20	7	9	73	41	+32	47	
5	Berwick Rangers	36	16	13	7	53	35	+18	45	
6	Raith Rovers	36	18	9	9	69	48	+21	45	
7	Stirling Albion	36	17	6	13	76	50	+26	40	
8	Montrose	36	15	7	14	71	64	+7	37	
9	Stranraer	36	14	8	14	64	70	−6	36	
10	Clydebank	36	13	8	15	47	48	−1	34	
11	St Mirren	36	12	10	14	62	66	−4	34	
12	Alloa Athletic	36	15	4	17	47	58	−11	34	
13	Cowdenbeath	36	11	9	16	59	85	−26	31	
14	Queen's Park	36	12	4	20	42	64	−22	28	
15	Stenhousemuir	36	11	5	20	44	59	−15	27	
16	East Stirlingshire	36	9	5	22	47	73	−26	23	
17	Albion Rovers	36	7	6	23	38	72	−34	20	
18	Forfar Athletic	36	5	6	25	42	94	−52	16	
19	Brechin City	36	5	4	27	33	99	−66	14	

Source: "1973-1974 Second Division - SPFL Archive". SPFL.

== See also ==
- 1973–74 in Scottish football
