= Alan Black (footballer) =

Scottish footballer (1943–2025)

Personal information
- Full name: Alan Douglas Black
- Date of birth: 4 June 1943
- Place of birth: Alexandria, Scotland
- Date of death: December 2025 (aged 82)
- Position: Left-back

Youth career
- 1961: Drumchapel Amateurs

Senior career*
Years	Team	Apps	(Gls)
1961–1964	Dumbarton	35	(7)
1964–1966	Sunderland	6	(0)
1966–1973	Norwich City	176	(1)
1973–1974	Dumbarton	10	(0)
Total		227	(8)
- * Club domestic league appearances and goals

Alan Douglas Black (4 June 1943 – December 2025) was a Scottish professional footballer. A left-back, he started and finished his career with Dumbarton. In between, he played for Sunderland and Norwich City. At Norwich, he was a member of the team that won the Second Division championship in 1972. Black died in December 2025, at the age of 82.

== Honours ==
Norwich City

- Second Division: 1971–72

== Sources ==
- Canary Citizens by Mike Davage, John Eastwood, Kevin Platt, published by Jarrold Publishing, (2001), ISBN 0-7117-2020-7
