= Peter McQuade =

Scottish footballer

Personal information
- Full name: Peter Murray McQuade
- Date of birth: 4 November 1948 (age 77)
- Positions: Wing half; full back

Youth career
- Valleyfield Colliery

Senior career*
Years	Team	Apps	(Gls)
1967–1973	East Fife	113	(4)
1972–1974	Dumbarton	4	(0)
1973–1976	Berwick Rangers	62	(5)
- * Club domestic league appearances and goals

Peter Murray McQuade (born 4 November 1948) was a Scottish footballer who played for Dumbarton, East Fife and Berwick Rangers.
