= Willie Menmuir =

Scottish footballer

Personal information
- Full name: William Fraser Menmuir
- Date of birth: 3 February 1952 (age 74)
- Position: Wing half

Youth career
- Sandyhills

Senior career*
Years	Team	Apps	(Gls)
1969–1971	Bristol City	2	(0)
1972–1974	Hearts	13	(1)
1974–1975	Dumbarton	7	(0)
1975–1976	Alloa Athletic	1	(0)
- * Club domestic league appearances and goals

William Fraser Menmuir (born 3 February 1952) was a Scottish footballer who played for Bristol City, Hearts, Dumbarton and Alloa Athletic.
