= 1976–77 Scottish Cup =

Tournament details
- Country: Scotland

Final positions
- Champions: Celtic
- Runners-up: Rangers

The 1976–77 Scottish Cup was the 92nd staging of Scotland's most prestigious football elimination competition. The Cup was won by Celtic who defeated Rangers in the final.

== First round ==
Home team	Score	Away team
Elgin City	4 – 0	Vale of Leithen
Inverness Caledonian	3 – 2	Stenhousemuir
Cowdenbeath	3 – 4	Clydebank
Clachnacuddin	1 – 2	Inverness Thistle
St Cuthbert Wanderers	0 – 1	Brechin City
Stranraer	1 – 0	Berwick Rangers

== Second round ==
Home team	Score	Away team
Albion Rovers	2 – 1	Raith Rovers
Brechin City	0 – 0	Inverness Thistle
Clydebank	2 – 0	Selkirk
Forfar Athletic	0 – 2	Elgin City
Girvan Amateurs	0 – 3	Queen's Park
Inverness Caledonian	1 – 1	Alloa Athletic
Meadowbank Thistle	1 – 2	East Stirlingshire
Stranraer	0 – 0	Stirling Albion

=== Replays ===
Home team	Score	Away team
Stirling Albion	2 – 1	Stranraer
Alloa Athletic	3 – 1	Inverness Caledonian
Inverness Thistle	1 – 3	Brechin City

== Third round ==
Home team	Score	Away team
St Johnstone	1 – 1	Dundee
Hibernian	3 – 0	Partick Thistle
Hamilton Academical	0 – 0	Clydebank
Airdrieonians	1 – 1	Celtic
Arbroath	1 – 0	Brechin City
Dunfermline Athletic	0 – 1	Aberdeen
East Fife	2 – 1	Clyde
East Stirlingshire	0 – 3	Albion Rovers
Hearts	1 – 1	Dumbarton
Greenock Morton	0 – 1	Ayr United
Motherwell	3 – 0	Kilmarnock
Queen of the South	3 – 2	Montrose
Queen's Park	0 – 0	Alloa Athletic
Rangers	3 – 1	Falkirk
St Mirren	4 – 1	Dundee United
Stirling Albion	1 – 1	Elgin City

=== Replays ===
Home team	Score	Away team
Dundee	4 – 2	St Johnstone
Clydebank	3 – 0	Hamilton Academical
Alloa Athletic	1 – 0	Queen's Park
Celtic	5 – 0	Airdrieonians
Dumbarton	0 – 1	Hearts
Elgin City	3 – 2	Stirling Albion

== Fourth round ==
Home team	Score	Away team
Celtic	1 – 1	Ayr United
Arbroath	1 – 1	Hibernian
Dundee	0 – 0	Aberdeen
East Fife	2 – 1	Albion Rovers
Hearts	1 – 0	Clydebank
Motherwell	2 – 1	St Mirren
Queen of the South	2 – 1	Alloa Athletic
Rangers	3 – 0	Elgin City

=== Replays ===
Home team	Score	Away team
Aberdeen	1 – 2	Dundee
Ayr United	1 – 3	Celtic
Hibernian	1 – 2	Arbroath

== Quarter-finals ==
Home team	Score	Away team
Arbroath	1 – 3	Dundee
Celtic	5 – 1	Queen of the South
Hearts	0 – 0	East Fife
Rangers	2 – 0	Motherwell

=== Replays ===
Home team	Score	Away team
East Fife	2 – 3	Hearts

== Semi-finals ==
30 March 1977

Rangers	2 – 0	Hearts

Hampden Park, Glasgow
Attendance: 23,222

6 April 1977

Celtic	2 – 0	Dundee

Hampden Park, Glasgow
Attendance: 29,900

== Final ==
7 May 1977

Celtic	1 – 0	Rangers
Andy Lynch (pen.)

Hampden Park, Glasgow
Attendance: 54,252
Referee: Bob Valentine

== See also ==
- 1976–77 in Scottish football
- 1976–77 Scottish League Cup
