= 1974–75 Scottish Division One =

69th season of top-tier football league in Scotland

Scottish Division One
- Season: 1974–75
- Champions: Rangers; 35th title
- Relegated: Airdrieonians; Kilmarnock; Partick Thistle; Dumbarton; Dunfermline; Clyde; Morton; Arbroath
- European Cup: Rangers
- UEFA Cup: Hibernian; Dundee United
- Cup Winners' Cup: Celtic
- Matches: 306
- Goals: 950 (3.1 per match)
- Top goalscorer: Andy Gray; Willie Pettigrew (20 goals)

The 1974–75 Scottish Division One was won by Rangers by seven points over second place Hibernian.

== League restructure ==
Following the 1974-75 season, the Scottish football league system was restructured from a two division setup to three divisions. The top 10 teams from this season stayed in the top flight, known as the Scottish Premier Division. The remaining eight clubs were joined by the top 6 from Division Two to form the Scottish First Division.

== Table ==
Pos	Team	Pld	W	D	L	GF	GA	GD	Pts	Qualification
1	Rangers (C)	34	25	6	3	86	33	+53	56	Qualification to European Cup first round
2	Hibernian	34	20	9	5	69	37	+32	49	Qualification to UEFA Cup First round
3	Celtic	34	20	5	9	81	41	+40	45	Qualification to European Cup Winners' Cup First round
4	Dundee United	34	19	7	8	72	43	+29	45	Qualification to UEFA Cup First round
5	Aberdeen	34	16	9	9	66	43	+23	41	
6	Dundee	34	16	6	12	48	42	+6	38	
7	Ayr United	34	14	8	12	50	61	−11	36	
8	Hearts	34	11	13	10	47	52	−5	35	
9	St Johnstone	34	11	12	11	41	44	−3	34	
10	Motherwell	34	14	5	15	52	57	−5	33	
11	Airdrieonians	34	11	9	14	43	55	−12	31	Relegation to Scottish First Division
12	Kilmarnock	34	8	15	11	52	68	−16	31	Relegation to Scottish First Division
13	Partick Thistle	34	10	10	14	48	62	−14	30	Relegation to Scottish First Division
14	Dumbarton	34	7	10	17	44	55	−11	24	Relegation to Scottish First Division
15	Dunfermline Athletic	34	7	9	18	46	66	−20	23	Relegation to Scottish First Division
16	Clyde	34	6	10	18	40	63	−23	22	Relegation to Scottish First Division
17	Morton	34	6	10	18	31	62	−31	22	Relegation to Scottish First Division
18	Arbroath	34	5	7	22	34	66	−32	17	Relegation to Scottish First Division

Source: Soccerbase and League Tables
(C) Champions

== Results ==
Home \ Away	ABE	AIR	ARB	AYR	CEL	CLY	DUM	DND	DNU	DNF	HOM	HIB	KIL	MOR	MOT	PAR	RAN	STJ
Aberdeen		1–0	5–1	3–0	3–2	4–1	1–1	4–0	2–0	1–1	2–2	2–3	4–0	3–3	2–2	1–1	1–2	3–1
Airdrieonians	2–2		1–0	1–2	1–0	0–3	1–1	0–1	1–1	5–2	1–1	0–0	2–2	3–1	2–0	1–0	4–3	1–1
Arbroath	1–2	3–1		1–3	2–2	2–0	0–3	2–2	1–3	1–3	3–1	0–2	0–0	0–2	1–1	2–0	1–2	0–0
Ayr United	2–0	1–0	1–0		1–5	1–0	1–3	2–1	1–1	3–2	3–3	2–2	3–2	1–1	0–4	5–2	1–1	1–0
Celtic	1–0	6–0	1–0	5–3		5–1	2–2	1–2	0–1	2–1	4–1	5–0	5–0	1–1	2–3	3–2	1–2	3–1
Clyde	1–1	2–1	3–1	1–0	2–4		1–3	0–1	1–2	2–2	2–2	0–3	4–2	1–2	0–0	2–2	1–2	2–2
Dumbarton	2–3	2–0	5–1	1–2	1–3	2–0		0–0	1–2	1–1	0–1	2–3	1–1	0–0	0–1	0–1	1–5	0–0
Dundee	0–1	1–0	0–1	2–3	0–6	4–1	2–1		2–0	2–0	2–0	0–0	4–1	3–0	4–1	1–0	1–2	4–0
Dundee United	4–0	1–0	3–1	3–1	0–0	3–3	3–3	3–0		1–0	5–0	1–3	3–4	1–0	5–0	2–1	2–2	1–1
Dunfermline Athletic	1–3	2–2	3–1	0–2	1–3	1–1	3–0	3–1	1–2		2–2	1–1	1–1	1–1	0–1	1–2	1–6	2–3
Heart of Midlothian	1–4	2–1	0–0	1–0	1–1	0–1	2–1	0–0	3–1	1–0		0–0	1–1	3–1	4–1	3–1	1–1	1–2
Hibernian	0–1	6–1	2–1	2–1	2–1	1–0	2–0	2–1	3–0	5–1	2–1		0–2	5–0	6–2	2–2	1–1	0–1
Kilmarnock	1–0	3–3	2–2	3–0	0–1	2–0	1–2	1–1	2–4	2–4	1–1	1–1		2–1	3–1	1–1	0–6	1–1
Morton	0–3	3–0	3–2	1–1	0–1	1–0	1–1	1–2	0–6	0–2	0–0	0–1	2–3		0–3	3–1	1–1	1–1
Motherwell	2–1	1–3	3–1	5–1	1–2	1–1	3–1	0–1	0–1	1–2	1–3	4–1	2–0	3–0		0–0	0–5	3–0
Partick Thistle	1–0	1–3	1–0	2–2	1–2	2–2	2–1	2–2	0–5	3–0	4–1	1–5	2–2	3–1	2–1		0–4	0–0
Rangers	3–2	0–1	3–0	3–0	3–0	3–1	3–2	1–0	4–2	2–0	2–1	0–1	3–3	2–0	3–0	3–2		1–0
St Johnstone	1–1	0–1	3–2	0–0	2–1	1–0	3–0	3–1	2–0	2–1	2–3	2–2	2–2	2–0	0–1	1–3	1–2	

Legend: Blue = home team win; Yellow = draw; Red = away team win.

== Awards ==
Award	Winner	Club
SFWA Footballer of the Year	(Scotland) Sandy Jardine	Rangers

== See also ==
- Nine in a row
