= John Taylor (Scottish footballer, born 1949) =

Scottish footballer (born 1949)

Personal information
- Date of birth: 22 June 1949 (age 77)
- Place of birth: Scotland
- Position: Goalkeeper

Youth career
- Ayr Albion

Senior career*
Years	Team	Apps	(Gls)
1965–1973	Queen's Park	104	(0)
1973–1974	Dumbarton	9	(0)
1974–1982	Stranraer	188	(0)
- * Club domestic league appearances and goals

John H. C. Taylor (born 22 June 1949) is a Scottish former footballer who played as a goalkeeper in the Scottish League for Queen's Park, Dumbarton and Stranraer.
