= Willie Borland =

Scottish footballer

Personal information
- Full name: William Borland
- Date of birth: 21 September 1952 (age 74)
- Position: Outside right

Youth career
- Glasgow United

Senior career*
Years	Team	Apps	(Gls)
1970–1973	St Mirren	23	(7)
1972–1973	Barrow		
1973–1974	Dumbarton	6	(1)
1974–1975	Stranraer	31	(2)
- * Club domestic league appearances and goals

William Borland (born 21 September 1952) was a Scottish footballer who played for St Mirren, Barrow, Dumbarton and Stranraer.
