= Willie Whigham =

Scottish footballer (1939–2021)

Personal information
- Full name: William Murdoch Morrison Whigham
- Date of birth: 9 October 1939
- Place of birth: Airdrie, North Lanarkshire, Scotland
- Date of death: 3 March 2021 (aged 81)
- Place of death: Airdrie, Scotland
- Position: Goalkeeper

Senior career*
| Years | Team | Apps | (Gls) |
- Shotts Bon Accord
| 1959–1960 | Albion Rovers | 1 | (0) |
| 1960–1966 | Falkirk | 186 | (0) |
| 1966–1972 | Middlesbrough | 187 | (0) |
| 1972–1973 | Dumbarton | 7 | (0) |
| 1974–1975 | Darlington | 4 | (0) |
- * Club domestic league appearances and goals

William Murdoch Morrison Whigham (9 October 1939 – 3 March 2021) was a Scottish footballer who played as a goalkeeper in the Scottish League for Albion Rovers (as a trialist), Falkirk and Dumbarton, and in the English Football League for Middlesbrough and Darlington.
