= Alan Bennett (footballer, born 1949) =

Scottish footballer

Personal information
- Full name: Alan Alex Symington Bennett
- Date of birth: 29 September 1949 (age 77)
- Place of birth: Glasgow
- Position: Wing half

Youth career
- Eastercraigs

Senior career*
Years	Team	Apps	(Gls)
1971–1972	Crystal Palace		
1972–1973	Morton		
1973–1974	Hamilton Academical	6	(0)
1974–1976	Dumbarton	6	(0)
1976–1981	East Stirlingshire	152	(14)
1981	Green Gully Ajax	7	(0)
1982	Green Gully	20	(0)
1983	Brisbane Lions	1	(0)
1983-1985	Albion Rovers (Aus)	45	(0)
- * Club domestic league appearances and goals

Alan Alex Symington Bennett (born 29 September 1957) is a Scottish former footballer, who played for Crystal Palace, Morton, Hamilton Academical, Dumbarton and East Stirlingshire. After moving to Australia, he went on to play for Victorian State League sides Green Gully Ajax, later known as Green Gully, and the Melbourne-based team called Albion Rovers. He also played a single game for National Soccer League side Brisbane Lions.
