= Brian Heron =

Scottish footballer

Personal information
- Full name: Brian Heron
- Date of birth: 19 June 1948 (age 78)
- Place of birth: Glasgow, Scotland
- Position: Left winger

Youth career
- Baillieston

Senior career*
Years	Team	Apps	(Gls)
1969	Rangers	7	(0)
1969–1972	Motherwell	75	(20)
1972–1974	Dumbarton	36	(10)
1974–1977	Oxford United	43	(8)
1977–1978	Scunthorpe United	25	(1)
Total		186	(39)
- * Club domestic league appearances and goals

Brian Heron (born 19 June 1948) is a Scottish former footballer, who played in the Scottish Football League for Rangers, Motherwell and Dumbarton, as well as in the Football League for Oxford United and Scunthorpe United.
