= Gordon Menzies =

Scottish footballer

Personal information
- Full name: Robert Gordon Menzies
- Date of birth: 10 November 1951 (age 74)
- Position: Right half

Youth career
- Kilsyth St Pats

Senior career*
Years	Team	Apps	(Gls)
1971–1974	Dumbarton	58	(0)
- * Club domestic league appearances and goals

Robert Gordon Menzies (born 10 November 1951) was a Scottish footballer who began his career with amateur side Kilsyth St Pats before turning 'senior' with Dumbarton. After three seasons he joined the 'junior' ranks, playing with Kirkintilloch Rob Roy then Petershill.
