= John Cushley =

Scottish footballer (1943–2008)

Personal information
- Full name: John Cushley
- Date of birth: 21 January 1943
- Place of birth: Hamilton, Scotland
- Date of death: 24 March 2008 (aged 65)
- Place of death: Bothwell, Scotland
- Position: Centre half

Senior career*
Years	Team	Apps	(Gls)
1959–1960	Blantyre Celtic	0	(0)
1960–1967	Celtic	30	(0)
1967–1970	West Ham United	38	(0)
1970–1972	Dunfermline Athletic	49	(0)
1972–1976	Dumbarton	85	(0)
Total		203	(0)
- * Club domestic league appearances and goals

John Cushley (21 January 1943 – 24 March 2008) was a Scottish footballer who played for Celtic, West Ham United, Dunfermline Athletic and Dumbarton.

He was born in 1943 in Hamilton, South Lanarkshire, and joined Celtic in July 1960 as a centre-half in the team's reserves. He made his first team debut for Celtic in March 1963, in a match against Kilmarnock at Rugby Park. Cushley found himself in the shadow of his teammate and former schoolmate, Billy McNeill, and many of his appearances for Celtic were dependent on McNeill's absence due to injury or international appearances. Nonetheless, Cushley played 41 games for Celtic, until he left the club in 1967 in a £10,000 transfer to West Ham United.

As well as his football career, Cushley was a graduate in modern languages from the University of Glasgow and worked as a teacher. In 1964, he acted as a Spanish translator when he and team manager Jimmy McGrory travelled to Spain in an unsuccessful attempt to sign Real Madrid legend Alfredo Di Stéfano to Celtic. During his two years in London with West Ham, Cushley also worked as a teacher.

In 1970, he returned to Scotland, playing for Dunfermline Athletic and Dumbarton before retiring in 1976. He continued teaching, and joined Celtic's coaching staff as an education officer.

In 2007, Cushley was diagnosed with motor neurone disease, the same illness that had claimed his Celtic teammate Jimmy Johnstone in 2006. He died at his home in Bothwell on 24 March 2008, aged 65.
