= Denis Ruddy =

Scottish footballer

Personal information
- Date of birth: 3 April 1950 (age 76)
- Position: Midfielder

Youth career
- Glasgow United

Senior career*
Years	Team	Apps	(Gls)
1967–1972	Clydebank	125	(1)
1972–1976	Dumbarton	63	(1)
1975–1976	Stenhousemuir	17	(2)
- * Club domestic league appearances and goals

Denis Ruddy (born 3 April 1950) is a Scottish former footballer who played for Clydebank, Dumbarton and Stenhousemuir.
