= Terry Mullen =

Scottish footballer

Personal information
- Full name: Terence James Mullen
- Date of birth: 28 February 1956 (age 70)
- Position: Full back

Youth career
- Denny Schools

Senior career*
| Years | Team | Apps | (Gls) |
| 1973–1977 | Dumbarton | 39 | (0) |
| 1976–1977 | Falkirk | 12 | (0) |
| 1977–1984 | Stenhousemuir | 192 | (0) |
| 1984–1985 | East Stirling | 3 | (0) |
- * Club domestic league appearances and goals

Terence James Mullen (born 28 February 1956) was a Scottish footballer who played for Dumbarton, Falkirk, Stenhousemuir and East Stirlingshire.
