= Ian McGregor (Scottish footballer) =

Scottish footballer

Personal information
- Date of birth: 10 January 1953 (age 73)
- Position: Goalkeeper

Youth career
- Cumbernauld United

Senior career*
Years	Team	Apps	(Gls)
1973–1977	Dumbarton	19	(0)
1977–1978	Stenhousemuir	1	(0)
- * Club domestic league appearances and goals

Ian McGregor (born 10 January 1953) was a Scottish footballer who began his career playing for Central League junior teams, including Cumbernauld United, Kilsyth Rangers and Vale of Clyde. In 1973, he signed 'senior' with Dumbarton, but after being unable to dislodge the No.1 goalkeeper for three seasons he moved to Stenhousemuir. He was no more successful here and returned to junior football where he played again with Kilsyth Rangers and also with Bonnybridge.
