= Don Watt (footballer) =

Scottish footballer

Personal information
- Full name: Donald Watt
- Date of birth: 23 July 1953 (age 73)
- Position: Full back

Youth career
- Shettleston

Senior career*
| Years | Team | Apps | (Gls) |
| 1970–1973 | Celtic | | |
| 1972–1978 | Dumbarton | 111 | (0) |
| 1979–1982 | East Stirlingshire | 93 | (0) |
- * Club domestic league appearances and goals

Donald Watt (born 23 July 1953) was a Scottish footballer who played for Celtic, Dumbarton and East Stirlingshire.
