= Peter Coleman (footballer) =

Scottish footballer (born 1944)

Personal information
- Full name: Peter Coleman
- Date of birth: 6 September 1944 (age 82)
- Position: Forward

Youth career
- Cambuslang Rangers

Senior career*
Years	Team	Apps	(Gls)
1964–1965	ES Clydebank	2	(0)
1965–1966	Alloa Athletic	1	(0)
1966-1968	Cambuslang Rangers		
1968–1970	Albion Rovers	83	(25)
1969–1976	Dumbarton	151	(17)
1976–1977	Petershill		
1978-1979	Cambuslang Rangers		
- * Club domestic league appearances and goals

Peter Coleman (born 6 September 1944) is a Scottish former footballer who played for ES Clydebank, Alloa Athletic, Albion Rovers and Dumbarton.

He spent some time in the Chelsea youth set-up in the early sixties but when he did not make the grade there, his youth team manager Dickie Foss encouraged him the sign for Croydon Amateurs then in the Surrey Senior League. The club won the Spartan League title in 1963-64 - their only season in the competition and moved up to the Athenian League Second Division. Peter played but a single game in that competition for the club before moving back to Scotland where he carried on playing and did well in the Scottish League.
