= Johnny Graham (footballer, born 1947) =

Scottish footballer (1947–2022)

Personal information
- Date of birth: 30 December 1947
- Date of death: 28 June 2022 (aged 74)
- Position: Half back

Youth career
- Arthurlie

Senior career*
Years	Team	Apps	(Gls)
1967–1977	Dumbarton	286	(18)
- * Club domestic league appearances and goals

Johnny Graham (30 December 1947 – 28 June 2022) was a Scottish footballer who played for Dumbarton.

== Biography ==
Graham began his footballing career with Arthurlie juniors in 1967, before being snapped up by Dumbarton in February 1968. From then on, he was a permanent fixture in the Dumbarton midfield for 10 years, before being released in 1977. He was part of the Division 2 Championship winning side of 1971-72 and played a total of 385 games for Dumbarton, still a record for the club.

Following his release from Dumbarton, Graham joined Renfrew Juniors for a short period before moving to Rutherglen Glencairn in 1978. Whilst there, he won 6 Scotland Junior International Caps, and retired in 1984 whilst playing with Johnstone Burgh.

Graham died on 28 June 2022, at the age of 74. Shortly before his death, Graham was inducted into the Dumbarton Hall of fame.
