= 1970–71 Dumbarton F.C. season =

Dumbarton
1970–1971 season
- Manager: Jackie Stewart
- Stadium: Boghead Park, Dumbarton
- Scottish League Division 2: 4th
- Scottish Cup: Second round
- Scottish League Cup: Semi-final
- Top goalscorer: League: Kenny Wilson (29); All: Kenny Wilson (40)

The 1970–71 season was the 87th football season in which Dumbarton competed at a Scottish national level, entering the Scottish Football League, the Scottish Cup and the Scottish League Cup. In addition Dumbarton competed in the Stirlingshire Cup.

== Scottish Second Division ==
Dumbarton had their best league campaign in over 10 years - including an unbeaten home record - the first for over 30 years, although with only 4 wins in 18 away matches, in the end it became a case of 'catch-up' - 8 wins in their last 10 games not being enough to challenge the leaders. Nevertheless, it was a creditable 4th-place finish, with 44 points, 12 behind champions Partick Thistle.

29 August 1970 Division 2	Dumbarton	2–0	Stranraer	Boghead Park
	Gallagher, B 27'; McCormack 89'			Referee: J Gordon

2 September 1970 Division 2	Dumbarton	1–1	Albion Rovers	Boghead Park
	Wilson 40' (pen.)		Toddenham 90'	Attendance: 1,200; Referee: W Wharton

5 September 1970 Division 2	Clydebank	2–1	Dumbarton	Kilbowie Park
	Hay 67', 69'		Wilson 19'	Attendance: 2,500; Referee: J Callaghan

12 September 1970 Division 2	Dumbarton	3–1	Brechin City	Boghead Park
	McCormack 38', 56'; Graham 62'		Reid 78'	Attendance: 1,500; Referee: A McKenzie

16 September 1970 Division 2	Dumbarton	1–1	East Fife	Boghead Park
	Gallagher, C 55'		Bernard 78'

19 September 1970 Division 2	Stirling Albion	2–2	Dumbarton	Annfield Stadium
	Hughes 44'; Christie 68'		Ferguson 46'; Coleman 61' (pen.)	Attendance: 1,000; Referee: E Pringle

26 September 1970 Division 2	Dumbarton	6–2	Berwick Rangers	Boghead Park
	McCormack 8', 39', 72'; Coleman 59', 69'; Donnelly 64'		Gilmour 81'; Keith 85'	Attendance: 1,500; Referee: R Davidson

3 October 1970 Division 2	Forfar Athletic	1–0	Dumbarton	Station Park, Forfar
	McNicoll 85'			Attendance: 1,000; Referee: P Hunter

10 October 1970 Division 2	Alloa Athletic	3–1	Dumbarton	Recreation Park, Alloa
	Cunningham 47'; McCallan 52', 80'		McCormack 54'	Attendance: 2,400; Referee: I Foote

17 October 1970 Division 2	Dumbarton	2–0	Raith Rovers	Boghead Park
	Gallagher, B 64'; McCormack 80'			Attendance: 2,300; Referee: R Crawford

24 October 1970 Division 2	Partick Thistle	1–1	Dumbarton	Firhill Stadium
	Coulston 12'		Jenkins 78'	Attendance: 3,000; Referee: J Paterson

7 November 1970 Division 2	Queen of the South	1–0	Dumbarton	Palmerston Park
	Law 8'			Attendance: 1,200; Referee: A MacDonald

21 November 1970 Division 2	Dumbarton	4–0	Montrose	Boghead Park
	Wilson 41', 43', 77'; Graham 58'			Attendance: 800; Referee: A Webster

28 November 1970 Division 2	Queen's Park	2–1	Dumbarton	Hampden Park
	McKay 19'; Bill 52'		Wilson 23'	Attendance: 1,684; Referee: A McKenzie

5 December 1970 Division 2	East Fife	3–2	Dumbarton	Bayview Park, Methil
	Hughes 54', 89'; Miller 80' (pen.)		Wilson 38', 76'	Attendance: 2,502; Referee: A Currie

12 December 1970 Division 2	Dumbarton	3–2	Stenhousemuir	Boghead Park
	Wilson 3', 40', 68' (pen.)		Rogerson 19'; Boyle 60'	Attendance: 1,000; Referee: E Thomson

26 December 1970 Division 2	Stranraer	2–2	Dumbarton	Stair Park
	Blackwood 43'		Gallagher, B 49'; Gallagher, C 50' (pen.)	Attendance: 1.300; Referee: W Anderson

1 January 1971 Division 2	Dumbarton	3–1	Clydebank	Boghead Park
	McCormack 31'; Wilson 46'; McKay 57'		Kane 45'	Attendance: 2,500; Referee: H Dempsey

2 January 1971 Division 2	Brechin City	0–2	Dumbarton	Glebe Park, Brechin
			Miller 20' (o.g.); Gallagher, C 27' (pen.)	Attendance: 600; Referee: R Henderson

16 January 1971 Division 2	Berwick Rangers	0–1	Dumbarton	Shielfield Park
			McCormack 65'	Attendance: 800; Referee: I Foote

23 January 1971 Division 2	East Stirling	3–1	Dumbarton	Firs Park
	Martin 31' (pen.); McQuade 54'; Donachie 56'		Coleman 21'	Attendance: 300; Referee: F Wilson

30 January 1971 Division 2	Dumbarton	5–1	Forfar Athletic	Boghead Park
	Wilson 48', 69', 86'; Coleman 60'; McCormack 83'		Davis 61'	Attendance: 1,500; Referee: R Anderson

6 February 1971 Division 2	Dumbarton	5–1	Alloa Athletic	Boghead Park
	Wilson 44'; Gallagher, C 45' (pen.); McCormack; McCulloch (o.g.); Coleman		Thomson 2' (pen.)	Attendance: 1,150; Referee: T Kellock

13 February 1971 Division 2	Arbroath	1–0	Dumbarton	Gayfield Park
	Jack 32'			Attendance: 1,568; Referee: T Marshall

20 February 1971 Division 2	Raith Rovers	3–0	Dumbarton	Starks Park
	Wallace 55', 84'; McGuire 82' (pen.)			Attendance: 2,700; Referee: J Callaghan

27 February 1971 Division 2	Dumbarton	2–2	Partick Thistle	Boghead Park
	Coleman 13'; Wilson 88'		Bone 33'; McQuade 84'	Attendance: 5,000; Referee: W McMillan

6 March 1971 Division 2	Hamilton	0–3	Dumbarton	Douglas Park
			Gallagher, B 17'; Gallagher, C 35'; Wilson 57'	Attendance: 600; Referee: I Bain

13 March 1971 Division 2	Dumbarton	2–1	Queen of the South	Boghead Park
	Gallagher, C 28' (pen.); Wilson 85'		Dempster 38'	Attendance: 1,500; Referee: A McDonald

22 March 1971 Division 2	Dumbarton	4–1	Hamilton	Boghead Park
	Coleman 34'; Wilson; Gallagher, C 82' (pen.); McCormack 88'		O'Brien 35'	Referee: B Padden

27 March 1971 Division 2	Montrose	3–1	Dumbarton	Links Park
	Stewart 37'; Crammond 65'; Young 88'		Donnelly 57'	Attendance: 930; Referee: E Pringle

10 April 1971 Division 2	Dumbarton	6–0	East Stirling	Boghead Park
	McCormack 19'; Gallagher, C 40'; Gallagher, B 55', 85'; Simpson 65' (o.g.); Coleman 81'			Attendance: 1,100; Referee: T Wharton

17 April 1971 Division 2	Stenhousemuir	2–0	Dumbarton	Ochilview Park
	Richardson 35'; Wight 84'			Referee: J Callaghan

21 April 1971 Division 2	Dumbarton	7–0	Stirling Albion	Boghead Park
	McCormack 44', 51'; Wilson 7', 69', 87', 88'			Attendance: 1,200

24 April 1971 Division 2	Dumbarton	3–0	Arbroath	Boghead Park
	Wilson 17', 27'; McCormack 60'			Attendance: 1,500; Referee: A Crawley

27 April 1971 Division 2	Albion Rovers	2–6	Dumbarton	Cliftonhill Stadium
	Skipton 14'; Trialist 41'		Coleman 5'; McCormack 17', 84'; Wilson 18', 35', 47'	Referee: R Henderson

29 April 1971 Division 2	Dumbarton	4–1	Queen's Park	Boghead Park
	Muir 2'; Gallagher, C 32'; Coleman 57'; McCormack 90'		Morrison 34'	Attendance: 2,000; Referee: A McKenzie

== Scottish League Cup ==
Five wins and a draw from the six sectional games meant an easy section qualification. Then Partick Thistle were dispatched in the quarter-final, with the mighty Celtic waiting in the semi-final - and it was only after an extra time 0–0 draw that Dumbarton eventually succumbed by the odd goal in seven in the replay again after extra time.

8 August 1970 Group 6	Alloa Athletic	1–3	Dumbarton	Recreation Park, Alloa
	McCallum 15'		Graham 13'; Gallagher, C 70'; Wilson 87'	Attendance: 1,400; Referee: A MacDonald

12 August 1970 Group 6	Dumbarton	2–2	Brechin City	Boghead Park
	Graham 40'; Wilson 67'		Dow 11'; Waddell 14'	Attendance: 1,500; Referee: I Foote

15 August 1970 Group 6	Berwick Rangers	0–2	Dumbarton	Shielfield Park
			Wilson 38'; Gallagher, C 43'	Attendance: 1,000; Referee: A Webster

19 August 1970 Group 6	Brechin City	1–3	Dumbarton	Glebe Park, Brechin
	Waddell 77'		McAdam 38'; McCormack 60'; Graham 87' (pen.)	Attendance: 400; Referee: R Wilson

22 August 1970 Group 6	Dumbarton	5–2	Alloa Athletic	Boghead Park
	Gallagher, C 38'; Wilson 69', 73', 83', 86'		Gilchrist 15' (o.g.); Cunningham 37'	Attendance: 2,000; Referee: J McRoberts

26 August 1970 Group 6	Dumbarton	3–2	Berwick Rangers	Boghead Park
	Wilson 2'; Gallagher, B 5'; McAdam, C 79'		Keith 25'; Tait 47'	Attendance: 2,000

9 September 1970 QF1	Partick Thistle	3–3	Dumbarton	Firhill Stadium
	McQuade 13'; Bone 22', 63'		Graham 47'; Coleman 57'; Strachan 71' (o.g.)	Attendance: 5,000; Referee: J Paterson

23 September 1970 QF2	Dumbarton	3–2	Partick Thistle	Boghead Park
	Gallagher, C 11'; Donnelly 50'; Gallagher, B 70'		Coulston 37'; Bone 86' (pen.)	Attendance: 2,000; Referee: J Paterson

7 October 1970 SF	Celtic	0–0 (a.e.t.)	Dumbarton	Hampden Park
				Attendance: 25,846; Referee: R Gordon

12 October 1970 SFr	Celtic	4–3 (a.e.t.)	Dumbarton	Hampden Park
	Lennox 13', 16'; Wallace 95'; Macari 113'		Gallagher, C 65' (pen.); Wilson 71'; Graham 119'	Attendance: 32,666; Referee: R Gordon

== Scottish Cup ==
In the Scottish Cup, Dumbarton had a disappointing second round loss to Stranraer.

19 December 1970 Cup R2	Stranraer	3–2	Dumbarton	Stair Park
	Blackwood 28', 77'; King 65'		Wilson 53'; Coleman 89'	Attendance: 1,380; Referee: E Thomson

== Stirlingshire Cup ==
Locally, in the Stirlingshire Cup, Dumbarton were knocked out in the first round by Clydebank.

16 November 1970 First Round	Clydebank	2–1	Dumbarton	Kilbowie Park
	Caskie 41'; Munro 81'		Gallagher, C 24'	Attendance: 500; Referee: B McGinlay

== Friendly ==
3 August 1970 Friendly	Dumbarton	1–0	(England) Tranmere Rovers	Boghead Park
	Gallagher, B 81'			Referee: T Marshall

== Player statistics ==
=== Squad ===
No.	Pos	Nat	Player	Total		Second Division		Scottish Cup		League Cup	
No.	Pos	Nat	Player	Apps	Goals	Apps	Goals	Apps	Goals	Apps	Goals
	GK	(Scotland) SCO	Laurie Williams	46	0	35	0	1	0	10	0
	GK	(Scotland) SCO	Trialist	1	0	1	0	0	0	0	0
	DF	(Scotland) SCO	Colin McAdam	7	2	1	0	0	0	6	2
	DF	(Scotland) SCO	Allan McKay	26	1	21+4	1	1	0	0	0
	DF	(Scotland) SCO	George Muir	43	1	33	1	1	0	9	0
	DF	(Scotland) SCO	Billy Wilkinson	5	0	3+1	0	0	0	1	0
	MF	(Scotland) SCO	Jack Bolton	36	0	31	0	1	0	4	0
	MF	(Scotland) SCO	Len Campbell	1	0	1	0	0	0	0	0
	MF	(Scotland) SCO	Carracher	1	0	1	0	0	0	0	0
	MF	(Scotland) SCO	Jim Cassells	1	0	1	0	0	0	0	0
	MF	(Scotland) SCO	Eddie Ferguson	24	1	19	1	1	0	4	0
	MF	(Scotland) SCO	Enoch Gilchrist	6	0	0	0	0	0	6	0
	MF	(Scotland) SCO	Johnny Graham	40	7	29	2	1	0	10	5
	MF	(Scotland) SCO	Ken McInnes	1	0	1	0	0	0	0	0
	FW	(Scotland) SCO	Peter Coleman	46	13	35	11	1	1	10	1
	FW	(Scotland) SCO	Colgan	1	0	1	0	0	0	0	0
	FW	(Scotland) SCO	Alan Craig	1	0	0+1	0	0	0	0	0
	FW	(Scotland) SCO	Joe Donnelly	20	3	10+5	2	1	0	0+4	1
	FW	(Scotland) SCO	Brian Gallagher	41	9	29+1	6	1	0	10	3
	FW	(Scotland) SCO	Charlie Gallagher	44	13	32+1	9	0+1	0	10	4
	FW	(Scotland) SCO	Brian Goodwin	4	0	2+2	0	0	0	0	0
	FW	(Scotland) SCO	Kenny Jenkins	45	1	35	1	0	0	10	0
	FW	(Scotland) SCO	Ronnie Kidd	7	0	4+3	0	0	0	0	0
	FW	(Scotland) SCO	Tom McAdam	1	0	0+1	0	0	0	0	0
	FW	(Scotland) SCO	Roy McCormack	44	21	33	21	1	0	10	0
	FW	(Scotland) SCO	Alex McMichael	1	0	0+1	0	0	0	0	0
	FW	(Scotland) SCO	John Paterson	3	0	3	0	0	0	0	0
	FW	(Scotland) SCO	Allan Watson	4	0	2+2	0	0	0	0	0
	FW	(Scotland) SCO	Kenny Wilson	45	40	34	29	1	1	10	10

=== Transfers ===
Amongst those players joining and leaving the club were the following

==== Players in ====
Player	From	Date
(Scotland) Peter Coleman	(Scotland) Albion Rovers	1 May 1970
(Scotland) Charlie Gallagher	(Scotland) Celtic	18 Jun 1970
(Scotland) Brian Gallagher	(Scotland) Morton	21 Jul 1970
(Scotland) Kenny Wilson	(Scotland) St Johnstone	21 Jul 1970
(Scotland) Jack Bolton	(Scotland) Raith Rovers	4 Sep 1970
(Scotland) Tom McAdam	(Scotland) 'S' Form	

==== Players out ====
Player	To	Date
(Scotland) David Anderson	(Scotland) Berwick Rangers	9 Oct 1970
(Scotland) Eddie Ferguson	(England) Rotherham Utd	29 Jan 1971
(Scotland) Allan Watson	(South Africa) Emigrated	

== Reserve team ==
For the first time in eight years, Dumbarton played an official reserve team which competed in the Combined Reserve League. The league was played in two series, and reporting of results is scarce - but both series were won by Partick Thistle.
