= 1971–72 Dumbarton F.C. season =

Dumbarton
1971–1972 season
- Manager: Jackie Stewart
- Stadium: Boghead Park, Dumbarton
- Scottish League Division 2: Champions
- Scottish Cup: Fourth Round
- Scottish League Cup: Prelims
- Top goalscorer: League: Kenny Wilson (38); All: Kenny Wilson (43)

The 1971–72 season was the 88th football season in which Dumbarton competed at a Scottish national level, entering the Scottish Football League, the Scottish Cup and the Scottish League Cup. In addition Dumbarton competed in the Drybrough Cup and the Stirlingshire Cup.

== Story of the season ==
=== July ===
The first additions of the season were made with forward John Paterson and right half Gordon Menzies being signed up on 30 June and 1 July respectively from Kilsyth St Pats. They were joined on 25 July by goalkeeper Bruce Livingstone who was signed from Pollok Juniors. Following the failure of the ambitious attempt to gain First Division status by way of a takeover of Clyde FC, Dumbarton began the new season by competing in a new tournament, the Drybrough Cup. The four highest scorers from the previous season's First and Second Divisions would play against each other, with Dumbarton being pitted against reigning Scottish champions Celtic. On 31 July the Sons fielded an almost unchanged side from the previous season and shocked the 22,000 Parkhead crowd by taking the lead after 8 minutes from a Charlie Gallacher penalty. Celtic were soon ahead with goals from Hood and Dalgleish, but a Kenny Wilson goal after 30 minutes levelled matters before halftime. The second half however was a different story with Dalgleish scoring 3 times to complete a 5–2 victory for Celtic.

=== August ===
On 7 August a friendly was played at Boghead against newly promoted East Fife and the Sons were given a lesson in goal scoring, losing 1–5. A week later Dumbarton confidently began their League Cup campaign, after having reached the semi final the previous season, with a 1–1 home draw against Stirling Albion, the goal being scored by Brian Gallagher. The positive start was continued on 18 August with a 3–2 away win against Stenhousemuir, Wilson, McCormack and Coleman getting the goals. A day later Dumbarton made their fourth new signing, inside right Drummond Mentiply from Glasgow Schools. Back on the field, for no explicable reason, the remaining four League Cup qualifying games were tamely lost, 0-1 and 1-3 (Jenkins) to Queen of the South, 1-2 (Brian Gallagher) to Stenhousemuir and 2-3 (Miller and McCormack) to Stirling Albion.

=== September ===
The disappointing start to the season continued when the league campaign started on 4 September with a 2–3 loss to local rivals Clydebank, despite leading 2–1 at halftime with goals from Wilson and McCormack. A midweek 2–0 victory over Hamilton brought some cheer the goals coming from Goodwin and Coleman, but the slump in form deepened losing 1–3 to Stranraer at Stair Park on 11 September, Kenny Wilson having scored first. Four days later Stirling Albion inflicted a 2–0 defeat at Annfield. A home fixture against pointless and goalless Forfar Athletic on 18 September provided an opportunity to pick up some points. However, despite leading at halftime the Sons had to settle for a 2–2 draw, Wilson and Graham scoring. On the same day, centre half John O’Brien signed up from St Anthonys. Manager Jackie Stewart decided to drop top goalscorer Kenny Wilson for the next match against Raith Rovers at Starks Park on 25 September. The outcome was a 6–1 thrashing, Graham scoring the Sons solitary goal. Wilson was back in the side for the fixture against Hamilton at Douglas Park on 29 September and the difference was clear with the striker bagging a brace in a 6–2 win, McCormack and Brian Gallagher also scoring two a piece. That result left the Sons trailing league leaders Cowdenbeath by 8 points with a game in hand.

=== October ===
The Sons followed up their midweek success with a 4–0 home win on 2 October against Brechin City, Charlie Gallagher scoring twice. On 9 October an away draw was secured against Berwick Rangers with McCormack scoring the equaliser 3 minutes from time. The following week Dumbarton defeated Stenhousemuir at Boghead by 3–2, Kenny Wilson getting on the scoresheet again with his 10th goal of the season. On 21 October winger Ian Fearn became the latest recruit signed from Hamilton and two days later two further goals from Wilson helped Sons to a 3–2 win over E Stirling at Firs Park. The five game undefeated streak however came to an end on 30 October when third placed Arbroath were tackled at Boghead. Wilson had the Sons in front but goals in the 85th and 90th minutes meant a 1–2 loss. Despite the better results the gap between the leaders Cowdenbeath and Dumbarton in 12th place was still 8 points.

=== November ===
On 6 November Dumbarton visited Central Park for a vital game against Cowdenbeath and it was Wilson again who scored the winner in the 88th minute. A week later an unchanged side turned out against Albion Rovers at Boghead and Wilson scored his first hattrick of the season for a 3–0 win. The next league fixture was played at Palmerston against Queen of the South on 20 November where a superb second half performance earned a 4–2 win, with Wilson scoring another two. A week later Sons had a free week in the league and a home friendly was arranged against a Celtic XI resulting in a 3–0 win. The final game of November gave manager Jackie Stewart the chance to play a few fringe players in a Stirlingshire Cup tie against Alloa Athletic. The result was a 1–1 draw but the game was lost on penalties. At the end of the month the three league wins raised Dumbarton into 6th place in the league, still 8 behind Cowdenbeath but with now 2 games in hand.

=== December ===
It was an injury hit Dumbarton that faced Montrose at Boghead on 4 December with 5 players being drafted in from the reserve squad. Nevertheless, goals from Wilson (his 20th of the season) McCormack and Charlie Gallagher were enough to gain a 3–2 win. The following week Ian Millar who was on an ‘S’ form was formally signed up and on the same day a close game was played against Queens Park at Hampden with a solitary Wilson goal earning the Sons a 1–0 victory. On 18 December it was a sixth straight league success with a resounding 7–1 win over Alloa Athletic, Wilson scoring 4. The final game of 1971 came on Christmas Day with a tie against St Mirren at Love Street. After a goalless first half McCormack broke the deadlock, and despite going ahead again after the Buddies had equalised, Sons had to settle in the end for a 2–2 draw. The unbeaten run of seven games left Dumbarton in 4th place, 6 points behind leaders Cowdenbeath with a game in hand,

=== January ===
The unbeaten run was extended to 8 games when Clydebank were defeated 3–2 at Kilbowie on New Years Day, but unexpectedly came to an end with a 4–2 home defeat to Stranraer. The goal scored by Kenny Wilson however meant he had scored in 12 consecutive league games. On 8 January only a 1–1 draw was achieved against strugglers Forfar at Station Park, and a week later a 2–2 draw was played out in a friendly at Boghead against a Partick Thistle XI. The match against Brechin City on 22 January was postponed as was the tie against Berwick Rangers a week later. The gap at the end of January between Dumbarton and leaders Cowdenbeath had returned to 8 points, but Sons now had 3 games in hand.

=== February ===
Third round Scottish Cup ties were played on 5 February and Dumbarton easily brushed aside Hamilton in a 3–1 victory, with Wilson scoring his 30th and 31st goals of the season. It was back to league duty a week later with new signing former Rangers winger Davy Wilson debuting in a 3–0 win against Stenhousemuir at Ochilview and this was followed up with a home 4–0 victory on 19 February against East Stirling. The following week a crowd of over 6000 gathered expectantly at Boghead for the fourth round Scottish Cup tie against Second Division rivals Raith Rovers. After a closely contested first half it was Raith that went ahead two minutes after the break and a further two goals consigned Sons to a disappointing 3–0 defeat. At the end of the month in the league Cowdenbeath still led but the gap had been reduced to 7 points with four games in hand.

=== March ===
On 4 March Dumbarton travelled to Gayfield to play Arbroath. In the first half Charlie Gallacher missed a penalty whilst Arbroath scored from a similar award. In the end the Sons had to settle for a 3–2 defeat. A week later league leaders Cowdenbeath played at Boghead and Wilson had Sons ahead at halftime. Despite an equaliser from Cowdenbeath early in the second half Roy McCormack scored the winner for a vital 2–1 win. On 18 March, despite their lowly league position Dumbarton found Albion Rovers a hard nut to crack but a Jenkins goal was sufficient to secure the points. The following week a large crowd of 4000 was on hand at Boghead to witness Sons win 2–0 over Quenn of the South. March ended with Dumbarton in 5th place trailing Cowdenbeath by 6 points with still 4 games in hand.

=== April ===
With no game on 1 April Dumbarton were back In action a week later against Montrose at Links Park, where a McCormack hattrick completed a 3–2 victory. This was followed by a midweek 2–1 home win over Stirling Albion with the following weekend's 3–0 triumph over Queens Park propelling Dumbarton into the promotion places for the first time. Another midweek game produced Sons fifth successive league win with a 5–0 thrashing of Raith Rovers, Kenny Wilson scoring all five goals. And on 22 April an early Charlie Gallacher goal was enough to beat Alloa at Recreation Park. Gallacher followed up with two more goals in the midweek 2–1 win over Brechin City. The game against St Mirren at Boghead on 29 April, the Sons seventh in 3 weeks, proved to be pivotal in a tight league finish where a point would be sufficient to claim promotion. In front of 9000 fans a Gallacher penalty had Dumbarton in front at half time, but despite having most of the play, the Buddies scored twice to claim a 2–1 win. Other results meant with their respective programmes completed, Arbroath led with 52 points (goal difference +30) and Stirling Albion in the promotion place with 50 points (goal difference +38). Dumbarton were in fourth with 50 points (goal difference +36).

=== May ===
The final Second Division game of the season was played at Boghead on 3 May against Berwick Rangers. A point would be enough for promotion and a win would secure the title ahead of Arbroath and First Division football for the first time in 50 years. This time no mistakes were made and in front of a 9000 crowd Sons won the game 4–2, with Kenny Wilson scoring the fourth goal and his 43rd of the season.

== Results ==
=== Scottish Second Division ===
4 September 1971 Division 2	Dumbarton	2–3	Clydebank	Boghead Park
	McCormack 32'; Wilson 42'		Ruddy 23' (o.g.); Kane 48', 86'	Attendance: 3,000; Referee: A Paterson

8 September 1971 Division 2	Dumbarton	2–0	Hamilton	Boghead Park
	Goodwin 57' (pen.); Coleman 78'			Attendance: 1,000; Referee: H McKee

11 September 1971 Division 2	Stranraer	3–1	Dumbarton	Stair Park
	Hay 31'; Traynor 42'; Campbell 48'		Wilson 7'	Attendance: 1,200; Referee: J McRoberts

15 September 1971 Division 2	Stirling Albion	2–0	Dumbarton	Annfield Stadium
	Lawson 75'; Armstrong 86' (pen.)			Attendance: 1,704; Referee: R Gordon

18 September 1971 Division 2	Dumbarton	2–2	Forfar Athletic	Boghead Park
	Wilson 20'; Graham 78'		Stewart 54' (pen.); Porter 83'	Attendance: 1,000; Referee: R H Davidson

25 September 1971 Division 2	Raith Rovers	6–1	Dumbarton	Starks Park
	Wallace 24'; Robertson 26', 53'; McLeod 65', 71'; McGuire 75' (pen.)		Graham 88'	Attendance: 1,500; Referee: S Anderson

29 September 1971 Division 2	Hamilton	2–6	Dumbarton	Douglas Park
	Douglas 61'; Brand 78'		McCormack 4', 45'; Wilson 30', 48', 70'; Gallagher, B 10'

2 October 1971 Division 2	Dumbarton	4–0	Brechin City	Boghead Park
	Gallacher, B 10'; Graham 29'; Gallacher, C 33', 62'			Attendance: 1,500; Referee: H Dempsey

9 October 1971 Division 2	Berwick Rangers	2–2	Dumbarton	Shielfield Park
	Wilson 37'; Tait 40'		McCormack 67' 88'	Attendance: 660; Referee: A Webster

16 October 1971 Division 2	Dumbarton	3–2	Stenhousemuir	Boghead Park
	Wilson 41'; Gallacher, C 62' (pen.); Graham 71'		Rooney 55'; Boyle 86'	Attendance: 1,200; Referee: T Kyle

23 October 1971 Division 2	East Stirling	1–3	Dumbarton	Firs Park
	McCluskey 25'		Wilson 24', 63'; Gallacher, C 27' (pen.)	Attendance: 750; Referee: R Valentine

30 October 1971 Division 2	Dumbarton	1–2	Arbroath	Boghead Park
	Wilson 29'		Bruce 85'; Cant 90'	Attendance: 2,000; Referee: A Paterson

6 November 1971 Division 2	Cowdenbeath	0–1	Dumbarton	Central Park, Cowdenbeath
			Wilson 88'	Attendance: 1,500; Referee: A McKenzie

13 November 1971 Division 2	Dumbarton	3–0	Albion Rovers	Boghead Park
	Wilson 57', 67', 68'			Attendance: 2,500; Referee: R Henderson

20 November 1971 Division 2	Queen of the South	2–4	Dumbarton	Palmerston Park
	McChesney 11'; Hood 58'		Gallacher, C 44', 68'; Wilson 61', 82'	Attendance: 1,500; Referee: A Crawley

4 December 1971 Division 2	Dumbarton	3–2	Montrose	Boghead Park
	Wilson 24'; Gallacher, C 47'; McCormack 67'		Buchan 27'; Barr 80'	Attendance: 1,500; Referee: T Marshall

11 December 1971 Division 2	Queen's Park	0–1	Dumbarton	Hampden Park
			Wilson 75'	Attendance: 1,594; Referee: J Grant

18 December 1971 Division 2	Dumbarton	7–1	Alloa Athletic	Boghead Park
	Wilson 10', 27', 59', 87'; Gallacher, C 15' (pen.); McCormack 40', 74'		Thomson 75'	Attendance: 1,500; Referee: J Gordon

25 December 1971 Division 2	St Mirren	2–2	Dumbarton	Love Street (stadium)
	Munro 75'; Borland 87'		McCormack 50', 68'	Attendance: 5,000; Referee: S Anderson

1 January 1972 Division 2	Clydebank	2–3	Dumbarton	Kilbowie Park
	McPaul 31'; Fallon 89'		McCormack 7'; Wilson 74', 79'	Attendance: 4,000; Referee: R Davidson

3 January 1972 Division 2	Dumbarton	2–4	Stranraer	Boghead Park
	McCormack 4'; Wilson 10'		Duffy 5'; Hood 63'; Campbell 70'	Attendance: 6,000; Referee: J Paterson

8 January 1972 Division 2	Forfar Athletic	1–1	Dumbarton	Station Park, Forfar
	Stewart 37'		Kidd 30'	Attendance: 996; Referee: W Mullen

12 February 1972 Division 2	Stenhousemuir	0–3	Dumbarton	Ochilview Park
			Gallacher, C 25' (pen.); McCormack 44', 50'	Attendance: 500; Referee: R Gordon

19 February 1972 Division 2	Dumbarton	4–0	East Stirling	Boghead Park
	Coleman 17'; Gallacher, C 79' (pen.); Wilson, K 80', 83'			Attendance: 2,500; Referee: A McKenzie

4 March 1972 Division 2	Arbroath	3–2	Dumbarton	Gayfield Park
	Cant 34' (pen.); Milne 59'; Fletcher 67'		McCormack 49'; Coleman 79'	Attendance: 1,958; Referee: I Foote

11 March 1972 Division 2	Dumbarton	2–1	Cowdenbeath	Boghead Park
	Wilson, K 21'; McCormack 57'		Dickson 50'	Attendance: 2,000; Referee: W Anderson

18 March 1972 Division 2	Albion Rovers	0–1	Dumbarton	Cliftonhill Stadium
			Jenkins 59'	Attendance: 500; Referee: J Gordon

25 March 1972 Division 2	Dumbarton	2–0	Queen of the South	Boghead Park
	Wilson, K 10'; Gallacher, C 89' (pen.)			Attendance: 4,000; Referee: A Paterson

8 April 1972 Division 2	Montrose	2–3	Dumbarton	Links Park
	Ewan 46'; Bolton 48' (o.g.)		McCormack 50', 64', 67'	Attendance: 1,200; Referee: R Valentine

11 April 1972 Division 2	Dumbarton	2–1	Stirling Albion	Boghead Park
	Gallacher, C 29' (pen.); McCormack 88'		Carr 75' (pen.)	Attendance: 5,000; Referee: B Padden

15 April 1972 Division 2	Dumbarton	3–0	Queen's Park	Boghead Park
	Gallacher, C 26'; Wilson, K 47', 65'			Attendance: 4,000; Referee: A McDonald

18 April 1972 Division 2	Dumbarton	5–0	Raith Rovers	Boghead Park
	Wilson, K 14', 28', 52', 71', 77'			Attendance: 4,000; Referee: R Dempsey

22 April 1972 Division 2	Alloa Athletic	0–1	Dumbarton	Recreation Park, Alloa
			Gallacher, C 3'	Attendance: 2,000; Referee: R Henderson

26 April 1972 Division 2	Brechin City	1–2	Dumbarton	Glebe Park, Brechin
	Cunningham 50'		Gallacher, C 31', 41'	Attendance: 1,000; Referee: R Greenlees

29 April 1972 Division 2	Dumbarton	1–2	St Mirren	Boghead Park
	Gallacher, C 40' (pen.)		Bryceland 50'; Borland 85'	Attendance: 9,000; Referee: B Padden

3 May 1972 Division 2	Dumbarton	4–2	Berwick Rangers	Boghead Park
	Coleman 3'; Gallacher, C 31', 57'; Wilson, K 68'		Coyne 19'; Davidson 87'	Attendance: 9,000; Referee: E Pringle

=== Scottish Cup ===
5 February 1972 Cup R3	Dumbarton	3–1	Hamilton	Boghead Park
	Wilson, K 40', 43'; Gallacher, C 85'		Strazalkowski	Attendance: 2,395; Referee: A Webster

26 February 1972 Cup R4	Raith Rovers	3–0	Dumbarton	Starks Park
	Wallace 47'; Georgeson 72'; Robertson 76'			Attendance: 6,236; Referee: T Marshall

=== Scottish League Cup ===
14 August 1971 Group 6	Dumbarton	1–1	Stirling Albion	Boghead Park
	Gallacher, B 9'		McMillan 61'	Attendance: 1,500; Referee: W Anderson

18 August 1971 Group 6	Stenhousemuir	2–3	Dumbarton	Ochilview Park
	McPaul; Richardson 89'		Wilson 2'; McCormack 17'; Coleman 36'	Attendance: 1,200; Referee: T Marshall

21 August 1971 Group 6	Queen of the South	1–0	Dumbarton	Palmerston Park
	Donald 52'			Attendance: 2,000; Referee: A McDonald

25 August 1971 Group 6	Dumbarton	1–2	Stenhousemuir	Boghead Park
	Gallacher, B 65'		Scobie 10'; Murdoch 66'	Attendance: 1,200; Referee: A Crawley

28 August 1971 Group 6	Stirling Albion	3–2	Dumbarton	Annfield Stadium
	Lawson 34', 65'; McMillan 41'		Miller 58'; McCormack 89'	Attendance: 2,000; Referee: A Paterson

1 September 1971 Group 6	Dumbarton	1–3	Queen of the South	Boghead Park
	Jenkins 49'		Law; Hood 27'	Referee: J Callaghan

=== Drybrough Cup ===
31 July 1971 Quarter Final	Celtic	5–2	Dumbarton	Celtic Park
	Hood 22'; Dalglish 28', 67', 69', 75'		Gallacher, C 8'; Wilson 30'	Attendance: 22,000; Referee: J Gordon

=== Stirlingshire Cup ===
30 November 1971 First round	Alloa Athletic	1–1 (4-3 p)	Dumbarton	Recreation Park, Alloa
	Campbell 55'		Wilson 43'	Referee: M Delaney

=== Friendlies ===
7 August 1971 Friendly	Dumbarton	1–5	East Fife	Boghead Park
	Wilson 27'		Miller 2' (pen.); Thomson 8'; McPhee 46', 88'; Borthwick 80'	Attendance: 1,500; Referee: A McGunnigle

27 November 1971 Friendly	Dumbarton	3–0	Celtic XI	Boghead Park
	McCormack 12', 61'; Wilson 69'			Referee: T Kellock

15 January 1972 Friendly	Dumbarton	2–2	Partick Thistle	Boghead Park
	Wilson 11'; Paterson 19'		Smith 13' (pen.); Johnstone 74'

== Player statistics ==
=== Squad ===
No.	Pos	Nat	Player	Total		Second Division		Scottish Cup		League Cup		Drybrough Cup	
No.	Pos	Nat	Player	Apps	Goals	Apps	Goals	Apps	Goals	Apps	Goals	Apps	Goals
	GK	(Scotland) SCO	Bruce Livingstone	1	0	1	0	0	0	0	0	0	0
	GK	(Scotland) SCO	Sandy McLaughlin	1	0	1	0	0	0	0	0	0	0
	GK	(Scotland) SCO	Laurie Williams	43	0	34	0	2	0	6	0	1	0
	DF	(Scotland) SCO	Colin McAdam	17	0	10	0	0+1	0	6	0	0	0
	DF	(Scotland) SCO	Allan McKay	25	0	22	0	1	0	1	0	1	0
	DF	(Scotland) SCO	George Muir	14	0	9	0	0	0	4	0	1	0
	DF	(Scotland) SCO	Billy Wilkinson	26	0	23	0	2	0	1	0	0	0
	MF	(Scotland) SCO	Jack Bolton	38	0	29	0	2	0	6	0	1	0
	MF	(Scotland) SCO	Johnny Graham	43	4	34+1	4	1	0	6	0	1	0
	MF	(Scotland) SCO	Gordon Menzies	10	0	8	0	1	0	1	0	0	0
	MF	(Scotland) SCO	Ken Morrison	2	0	1	0	0	0	1	0	0	0
	MF	(Scotland) SCO	John O'Brien	6	0	5	0	0	0	1	0	0	0
	FW	(Scotland) SCO	Peter Coleman	43	5	33+1	4	2	0	6	1	1	0
	FW	(Scotland) SCO	Iain Fearn	4	0	4	0	0	0	0	0	0	0
	FW	(Scotland) SCO	Brian Gallagher	16	4	10+1	2	0	0	4	2	1	0
	FW	(Scotland) SCO	Charlie Gallagher	36	20	30+1	19	1+1	1	2	0	1	0
	FW	(Scotland) SCO	Brian Goodwin	11	1	6	1	0	0	4+1	0	0	0
	FW	(Scotland) SCO	Kenny Jenkins	45	2	36	1	2	0	6	1	1	0
	FW	(Scotland) SCO	Ronnie Kidd	4	1	3	1	0	0	0+1	0	0	0
	FW	(Scotland) SCO	Tom McAdam	3	0	1+2	0	0	0	0	0	0	0
	FW	(Scotland) SCO	Roy McCormack	45	20	36	19	2	0	6	1	1	0
	FW	(Scotland) SCO	Drummond Mentiply	2	0	0	0	1	0	1	0	0	0
	FW	(Scotland) SCO	Ian Miller	9	1	7	0	0	0	1+1	1	0	0
	FW	(Scotland) SCO	John Paterson	15	0	4+8	0	2	0	0	0	0+1	0
	FW	(Scotland) SCO	Davie Wilson	15	0	14	0	1	0	0	0	0	0
	FW	(Scotland) SCO	Kenny Wilson	44	43	35+1	38	2	2	5	2	1	1

=== Transfers ===
Amongst those players joining and leaving the club were the following:

==== Players in ====
Player	From	Date
(Scotland) John Paterson	(Scotland) Kilsyth St Pat's	30 Jun 1971
(Scotland) Davie Wilson	(Scotland) Dundee United	10 Feb 1972

==== Players out ====
Player	To	Date
(Scotland) Len Campbell	(Scotland) Yoker Ath	5 Jul 1971
(Scotland) Brian Goodwin	(Scotland) Stranraer	8 Jan 1972
(Scotland) George Muir	(Scotland) Retired	

== Reserve team ==
For the second season running, Dumbarton competed in the Combined Reserve League. Results were mixed and as with the previous season, reporting of results was scarce, nonetheless it is known that the league was never competed.
