= 1969–70 Dumbarton F.C. season =

Dumbarton
1969–1970 season
- Manager: Jackie Stewart
- Stadium: Boghead Park, Dumbarton
- Scottish League Division 2: 7th
- Scottish Cup: First round
- Scottish League Cup: Quarter-final
- Top goalscorer: League: Roy McCormack (13); All: Kenny Jenkins/Roy McCormack (18)

The 1969–70 season was the 86th football season in which Dumbarton competed at a Scottish national level, entering the Scottish Football League, the Scottish Cup and the Scottish League Cup. In addition Dumbarton competed in the Stirlingshire Cup.

== Scottish Second Division ==
Although the league campaign saw a great improvement from the previous season, the inability to take points from the 'front-runners' meant that Dumbarton were never really in with a chance of snatching a promotion place and finished in 7th place, with 40 points, 16 behind champions Falkirk.

30 August 1969 Division 2	Dumbarton	1–0	Stranraer	Boghead Park
	Jenkins 44'			Attendance: 1,000; Referee: T Kellock

6 September 1969 Division 2	Forfar Athletic	1–4	Dumbarton	Station Park, Forfar
	Dick 31'		McCormack 70'; Boyd, I 760', 81'; Moffat 80'	Attendance: 1,147; Referee: R Davidson

13 September 1969 Division 2	Dumbarton	1–2	Brechin City	Boghead Park
	Moffat 60' (pen.)		Sneddon 82'; Burns 85'	Attendance: 600; Referee: T Wharton

17 September 1969 Division 2	East Fife	2–1	Dumbarton	Bayview Park, Methil
	Waddell 15'; Borthwick 51'		Jenkins 3'	Attendance: 1,150; Referee: A McKenzie

20 September 1969 Division 2	Stirling Albion	2–2	Dumbarton	Annfield Stadium
	Corrigan 78'; Grant 80'		Ferguson 41'; McCormack 89'	Attendance: 500; Referee: B Padden

27 September 1969 Division 2	Dumbarton	5–1	Clydebank	Boghead Park
	Jenkins 10', 46', 67'; Graham 44' (pen.); Ferguson 49'		Nelson 43'	Attendance: 1,700; Referee: A Dempsey

1 October 1969 Division 2	Berwick Rangers	0–1	Dumbarton	Shielfield Park
			Boyd, I 87'	Attendance: 1,135

4 October 1969 Division 2	Dumbarton	1–3	Alloa Athletic	Boghead Park
	Ferguson 15'		McCallan 10', 13'; Marshall 60'	Attendance: 600; Referee: A McDonald

11 October 1969 Division 2	Cowdenbeath	1–0	Dumbarton	Central Park, Cowdenbeath
	Dickson 36'			Attendance: 2,000; Referee: J Gordon

18 October 1969 Division 2	Dumbarton	0–3	Arbroath	Boghead Park
			Reid 29', 66'; Ward 85'	Attendance: 1,500; Referee: J Paterson

25 October 1969 Division 2	Falkirk	0–0	Dumbarton	Brockville Park
				Attendance: 3,000; Referee: R Wilson

29 October 1969 Division 2	Dumbarton	1–0	Hamilton	Boghead Park
	Graham 70'			Referee: A McDonald

1 November 1969 Division 2	Albion Rovers	0–0	Dumbarton	Cliftonhill Stadium
				Attendance: 250; Referee: I Bain

8 November 1969 Division 2	Dumbarton	2–0	Queen of the South	Boghead Park
	Jamieson 19'; Ferguson 88'			Attendance: 600; Referee: D Webster

12 November 1969 Division 2	Dumbarton	5–1	Stenhousemuir	Boghead Park
	Jenkins 9', 52', 61'; Watson; McCormack 64'		McGurkin 84'	Attendance: 800; Referee: J McKee

15 November 1969 Division 2	Dumbarton	3–0	Queen's Park	Boghead Park
	Watson 14', 27'; Muir 81'			Attendance: 2,000; Referee: T Kellock

22 November 1969 Division 2	Montrose	0–2	Dumbarton	Links Park
			Ferguson 8'; McCormack 80'	Attendance: 300; Referee: A McKenzie

29 November 1969 Division 2	Stenhousemuir	2–2	Dumbarton	Links Park
	McAllister 11'; McGuckin 35'		Boyd, E 51'; McCormack 75'	Attendance: 300; Referee: A McKenzie

13 December 1969 Division 2	Stranraer	6–1	Dumbarton	Stair Park
	Jamieson 14' (o.g.); Copland 34', 55'; Orr 44'; Campbell 53'; Dillon 89'		McCormack 53'	Attendance: 600; Referee: B Pudden

1 January 1970 Division 2	Clydebank	0–0	Dumbarton	Kilbowie Park
				Attendance: 1,979; Referee: A Kellock

3 January 1970 Division 2	Dumbarton	1–0	Stirling Albion	Boghead Park
	McCormack 89'			Attendance: 1,930; Referee: A Currie

17 January 1970 Division 2	Brechin City	1–4	Dumbarton	Glebe Park, Brechin
	Dunn 30'		Jenkins 15', 33'; McCormack 27'; Ferguson 70'	Referee: I Bain

31 January 1970 Division 2	Dumbarton	2–1	Forfar Athletic	Boghead Park
	McCormack 31'; Graham 85'		Waddell 22'	Attendance: 1,000; Referee: J Kelly

7 February 1970 Division 2	Hamilton	1–3	Dumbarton	Douglas Park
	Goodwin 74' (pen.)		Donnelly 1'; Halpin 51' (o.g.); McCormack 65'	Referee: W Mullen

14 February 1970 Division 2	Dumbarton	2–0	East Fife	Boghead Park
	McMichael 66'; Watson 71'			Attendance: 1,500; Referee: J Grant

21 February 1970 Division 2	Alloa Athletic	0–0	Dumbarton	Recreation Park, Alloa
				Attendance: 1,700; Referee: J McRoberts

28 February 1970 Division 2	Dumbarton	1–2	Cowdenbeath	Boghead Park
	Donnelly 32'		Bostock 48'; Dickson 71'	Attendance: 1,800; Referee: A McKenzie

7 March 1970 Division 2	Arbroath	5–0	Dumbarton	Gayfield Park
	Jack 5' 50'; Walker 15'; Wilkie 52'; Campbell 83'			Attendance: 2,000; Referee: W Anderson

14 March 1970 Division 2	Dumbarton	1–2	Falkirk	Boghead Park
	Graham 89'		Roxburgh 16'; Ferguson 43'	Attendance: 2,000; Referee: B Padden

21 March 1970 Division 2	Dumbarton	2–0	Albion Rovers	Boghead Park
	McCormack 65'; Graham 67'			Attendance: 1,000; Referee: R Crawford

28 March 1970 Division 2	Queen of the South	3–2	Dumbarton	Palmerston Park
	McChesney 40'; Watson 50'		Watson 30' (pen.); McCormack 72'	Attendance: 1,100; Referee: E Thomson

4 April 1970 Division 2	Queen's Park	0–2	Dumbarton	Hampden Park
			Watson 63', 87' (pen.)	Attendance: 1,130; Referee: J McNee

13 April 1970 Division 2	Dumbarton	2–1	Berwick Rangers	Boghead Park
	Jamieson 35'; Jenkins 37'		Richardson 52'	Attendance: 600; Referee: R Wilson

18 April 1970 Division 2	Dumbarton	0–2	Montrose	Boghead Park
			Livingstone 36'; Cramond 90'	Attendance: 600; Referee: R Wilson

21 April 1970 Division 2	Dumbarton	0–2	East Stirling	Boghead Park
			Simpson 16'; McQuade 87'	Referee: J Callaghan

28 April 1970 Division 2	East Stirling	2–1	Dumbarton	Firs Park
	Martin 57' (pen.); Browning 60'		McCormack 10'	Attendance: 180

== Scottish League Cup ==
The League Cup however, brought some cheer, with four wins and a draw from the six sectional games, Dumbarton qualified to meet Brechin City in a play off. A good home win after a tight draw at Brechin meant a quarter final against Ayr United, who were however to prove too strong.

9 August 1969 Group 7	Clydebank	1–3	Dumbarton	Kilbowie Park
	Munro 33'		Ferguson 42', 89'; Watson 47'	Attendance: 3,500; Referee: J McRoberts

13 August 1969 Group 7	Dumbarton	2–3	Cowdenbeath	Boghead Park
	Watson 38'; McMichael 85'		Sludden 8'; Sharpe; Bostock 87'	Attendance: 800; Referee: W Anderson

16 August 1969 Group 7	Stranraer	2–2	Dumbarton	Stair Park
	Clark; Campbell		Jenkins 5', 82'	Attendance: 1,150; Referee: A Crawley

20 August 1969 Group 7	Cowdenbeath	2–3	Dumbarton	Central Park, Cowdenbeath
	Muir 25' (o.g.); Dickson 29'		Morriaon 30' (o.g.); Jenkins 44' (pen.); Moffat 86'	Attendance: 500; Referee: I Bain

23 August 1969 Group 7	Dumbarton	1–0	Clydebank	Boghead Park
	Watson 15'			Attendance: 3,000; Referee: J Grant

27 August 1969 Group 7	Dumbarton	2–0	Stranraer	Boghead Park
	Jenkins 76'; Watson 89'			Attendance: 900

1 September 1969 PO1	Brechin City	1–1	Dumbarton	Glebe Park, Brechin
	Reid 23'		Jenkins 39'	Attendance: 1,000; Referee: J Callaghan

3 September 1969 PO2	Dumbarton	5–2 (6–3 agg.)	Brechin City	Boghead Park
	Jenkins 9', 23'; Moffat 41'; McCormack 84', 90'		Sneddon 15'; Reid 27'	Attendance: 1,500; Referee: J Callaghan

10 September 1969 QF1	Dumbarton	1–4	Ayr United	Boghead Park
	Graham 10'		McCulloch 5'; Ferguson 16', 50'; Ingram 55'	Attendance: 1,200; Referee: W Anderson

24 September 1969 QF2	Ayr United	1–0 (5–1 agg.)	Dumbarton	Somerset Park
	Rough 40'			Attendance: 2,500; Referee: W Anderson

== Scottish Cup ==
In the Scottish Cup, Dumbarton had an easy time beating non-league Gala Fairydean in the second preliminary round, but it was a huge disappointment to lose in the first round proper to Division 2 strugglers Forfar Athletic at home.

27 December 1969 Cup P2	Gala Fairydean	1–4	Dumbarton	Netherdale
	Hamilton 62'		McCormack 40'; Boyd, I	Attendance: 374; Referee: A Currie

24 January 1970 Cup R1	Dumbarton	1–2	Forfar Athletic	Boghead Park
	McGhee 75'		Waddell 10'; May 58'	Attendance: 2,500; Referee: J Kelly

== Stirlingshire Cup ==
Locally, in the Stirlingshire Cup, Dumbarton reached their first final for five years, before losing out to Falkirk.

16 December 1969 First Round	Dumbarton	1–1	Stirling Albion	Boghead Park
	Watson 70'		Anderson 57'	Referee: W Moffat

3 March 1970 First Round replay	Stirling Albion	0–1	Dumbarton	Annfield Stadium
			McCormack 76'	Referee: J Moffat

31 March 1970 Semi Final	Dumbarton	5–1	Alloa Athletic	Boghead Park
	Jenkins 10', 14', 50', 60'; Hogg 24'		McCulloch 84'

2 May 1970 Final	Falkirk	1–0	Dumbarton	Brockville Park
	Miller 24' (pen.)			Attendance: 2,000; Referee: J Grant

== Friendlies ==
5 August 1969 Friendly	Dumbarton	1–2	(England) Workington	Boghead Park
	McMichael 44'		Spencer 40'; Spratt 82'	Referee: H Dempsey

24 April 1970 Friendly	Dumbarton	1–1	Inverness Thistle	Boghead Park
	Jenkins 18'		Stephen 83'

== Player statistics ==
=== Squad ===
No.	Pos	Nat	Player	Total		Second Division		Scottish Cup		League Cup	
No.	Pos	Nat	Player	Apps	Goals	Apps	Goals	Apps	Goals	Apps	Goals
	GK	(Scotland) SCO	David Anderson	30	0	25	0	2	0	3	0
	GK	(Scotland) SCO	Steve Anderson	12	0	5	0	0	0	7	0
	GK	(Scotland) SCO	Laurie Williams	6	0	6	0	0	0	0	0
	DF	(Scotland) SCO	Colin McAdam	12	0	8+4	0	0	0	0	0
	DF	(Scotland) SCO	Allan McKay	44	0	33	0	2	0	9	0
	DF	(Scotland) SCO	George Muir	48	1	36	1	2	0	10	0
	DF	(Scotland) SCO	Billy Wilkinson	5	0	4	0	0	0	1	0
	MF	(Scotland) SCO	Len Campbell	48	0	36	0	2	0	10	0
	MF	(Scotland) SCO	Rikki Cuthbert	3	0	1+1	0	0	0	1	0
	MF	(Scotland) SCO	Eddie Ferguson	40	8	26+2	6	2	0	10	2
	MF	(Scotland) SCO	Johnny Graham	48	6	36	5	2	0	10	1
	MF	(Scotland) SCO	John Jamieson	24	2	23+1	2	0	0	0	0
	MF	(Scotland) SCO	John McGhee	19	1	8+1	0	0+1	1	9	0
	FW	(Scotland) SCO	Eddie Boyd	15	1	14	1	1	0	0	0
	FW	(Scotland) SCO	Ian Boyd	14	4	7+2	3	1	1	3+1	0
	FW	(Scotland) SCO	Joe Donnelly	13	2	13	2	0	0	0	0
	FW	(Scotland) SCO	John Hemphill	2	0	2	0	0	0	0	0
	FW	(Scotland) SCO	Davie Hogg	3	0	2	0	0	0	0+1	0
	FW	(Scotland) SCO	Kenny Jenkins	39	18	28	11	1	0	10	7
	FW	(Scotland) SCO	Roy McCormack	41	18	34	13	2	3	4+1	2
	FW	(Scotland) SCO	Alex McMichael	32	2	14+8	1	1	0	9	1
	FW	(Scotland) SCO	Gus Moffat	11	4	4	2	0	0	7	2
	FW	(Scotland) SCO	Allan Watson	43	11	31+3	7	2	0	7	4

=== Transfers ===
Amongst those players joining and leaving the club were the following:

==== Players in ====
Player	From	Date
(Scotland) Allan McKay	(Scotland) Motherwell	22 May 1969
(Scotland) Eddie Ferguson	(Scotland) Dunfermline Ath	19 Jun 1969
(Scotland) Kenny Jenkins	(Scotland) Albion Rovers	26 Jun 1969
(Scotland) John Jamieson	(Scotland) Albion Rovers	25 Oct 1969
(Scotland) Colin McAdam	(Scotland) Clydebank Juv	12 Mar 1970
(Scotland) Laurie Williams	(Scotland) Port Glasgow	30 Mar 1970

==== Players out ====
Player	To	Date
(Scotland) John McGhee	(Scotland) Stenhousemuir	2 Mar 1970
