= Dundee United F.C. in the 1970s =

This page covers the seasons from 1970–71 to 1979–80.

== 1970–71 ==
The club finished the Division One season in sixth place, missing out on European qualification by one place as rivals Dundee pipped them by two points. Aberdeen knocked United out of the Scottish Cup in the fourth round while the club failed to get past the League Cup first round. United were knocked out of the Inter-Cities Fairs Cup in the second round by Czechoslovak side TJ Sparta ČKD Praha.

Home colours	Away colours

Pos	Team	Pld	W	D	L	GF	GA	GD	Pts
5	Dundee	34	14	10	10	53	45	+8	38
6	Dundee United	34	14	8	12	53	54	−1	36
7	Falkirk	34	13	9	12	46	53	−7	35

Source: Soccerbase and League Tables

== 1971–72 ==
The club finished the Division One season in ninth place, with Jim McLean beginning a 22-year managerial spell with the club in December 1971, taking over from Jerry Kerr. Aberdeen knocked United out of the Scottish Cup for the second year running, this time in the third round, while the club again failed to get past the League Cup first round. In the Texaco Cup, United were beaten 8–5 on aggregate by eventual winners Derby County in the first round.

Home colours	Away colours

Pos	Team	Pld	W	D	L	GF	GA	GD	Pts
8	St Johnstone	34	12	8	14	52	58	−6	32
9	Dundee United	34	12	7	15	55	70	−15	31
10	Motherwell	34	11	7	16	49	69	−20	29

Source: Soccerbase and League Tables

== 1972–73 ==
The club finished the Division One season in seventh place, in Jim McLean's first full season since taking over from Jerry Kerr. Rangers knocked United out of the Scottish Cup third round, while the club reached the League Cup second round. In the Texaco Cup, United were again beaten in the first round, this time on penalties by Leicester City after a 3–3 aggregate draw.

Home colours	Away colours

Pos	Team	Pld	W	D	L	GF	GA	GD	Pts
6	Ayr United	34	16	8	10	50	51	−1	40
7	Dundee United	34	17	5	12	56	51	+5	39
8	Motherwell	34	11	9	14	38	48	−10	31

Source: Soccerbase and League Tables

== 1973–74 ==
The club finished the Division One season in eighth place, again sandwiched between Ayr United and Motherwell. The club reached their first Scottish Cup Final this season, only to be beaten by Celtic. In the League Cup, the club failed to get past the first round while in the Texaco Cup, United were eliminated in the semi-finals after extra time by eventual winners Newcastle United.

Home colours	Away colours

Pos	Team	Pld	W	D	L	GF	GA	GD	Pts	Qualification or relegation
7	Ayr United	34	15	8	11	44	40	+4	38	
8	Dundee United	34	15	7	12	55	51	+4	37	1974–75 European Cup Winners' Cup First round
9	Motherwell	34	14	7	13	45	40	+5	35	

Source: Soccerbase and League Tables

== 1974–75 ==
The club finished the Division One season in fourth place, in the last season before the formation of the Premier Division. The club were knocked out of the Scottish Cup by Aberdeen for the third time in five years, this time in the fourth round, while once again United failed to get past the League Cup first round. In the Cup Winners Cup, United were eliminated in the second round by Turkish side Bursaspor.

Home colours	Away colours

Pos	Team	Pld	W	D	L	GF	GA	GD	Pts	Qualification
3	Celtic	34	20	5	9	81	41	+40	45	Qualification to European Cup Winners' Cup First round
4	Dundee United	34	19	7	8	72	43	+29	45	Qualification to UEFA Cup First round
5	Aberdeen	34	16	9	9	66	43	+23	41	

Source: Soccerbase and League Tables

== 1975–76 ==
The club finished the season in eighth place, in the first season of the new Premier Division, avoiding relegation on goal difference. The club were knocked out of the Scottish Cup by Hibernian in the fourth round after a replay, while once again United failed to get past the League Cup first round. In the UEFA Cup, United were eliminated in the second round by Portuguese side Porto.

Home colours	Away colours

Pos	Team	Pld	W	D	L	GF	GA	GD	Pts	Qualification or relegation
7	Aberdeen	36	11	10	15	49	50	−1	32	
8	Dundee United	36	12	8	16	46	48	−2	32	
9	Dundee (R)	36	11	10	15	49	62	−13	32	Relegation to the 1976–77 Scottish First Division

Source: Statto
Rules for classification: 1) points; 2) goal difference; 3) number of goals scored.
(R) Relegated

== 1976–77 ==
The club finished the season in fourth place, in the second season of the new Premier Division. The club were knocked out of the Scottish Cup by St Mirren in the third round, while once again United failed to get past the League Cup section.

Home colours	Away colours

Pos	Team	Pld	W	D	L	GF	GA	GD	Pts	Qualification or relegation
3	Aberdeen	36	16	11	9	56	42	+14	43	Qualification for the UEFA Cup first round
4	Dundee United	36	16	9	11	54	45	+9	41	Qualification for the UEFA Cup first round
5	Partick Thistle	36	11	13	12	40	44	−4	35	

Source: Statto
Rules for classification: 1) points; 2) goal difference; 3) number of goals scored.

== 1977–78 ==
The club finished the season in third place in the Premier Division. The club lost to Rangers in the Semi final, United also lost on penalties to Hearts after the sides drew over two legs in the Quarter Final stage. In the UEFA Cup, United were eliminated in the first round by Danish side Copenhagen.

Home colours	Away colours

Pos	Team	Pld	W	D	L	GF	GA	GD	Pts	Qualification or relegation
2	Aberdeen	36	22	9	5	68	29	+39	53	Qualification for the Cup Winners' Cup first round
3	Dundee United	36	16	8	12	42	32	+10	40	Qualification for the UEFA Cup first round
4	Hibernian	36	15	7	14	51	43	+8	37	Qualification for the UEFA Cup first round

Source: Statto
Rules for classification: 1) points; 2) goal difference; 3) number of goals scored.

== 1978–79 ==
The club finished the season in third place, finishing just four points behind champions Celtic. The club were knocked out of the Scottish Cup by St Mirren in the third round, while Celtic knocked United out of the League Cup in the second round. In the UEFA Cup, United were narrowly eliminated in the first round by Belgian side Standard Liège.

Home colours	Away colours

Pos	Team	Pld	W	D	L	GF	GA	GD	Pts	Qualification or relegation
2	Rangers	36	18	9	9	52	35	+17	45	Qualification for the Cup Winners' Cup first round
3	Dundee United	36	18	8	10	56	37	+19	44	Qualification for the UEFA Cup first round
4	Aberdeen	36	13	14	9	59	36	+23	40	Qualification for the UEFA Cup first round

Source: Statto and RSSSF
Rules for classification: 1) points; 2) goal difference; 3) number of goals scored.

== 1979–80 ==
The club finished the season in fourth place, beating Rangers to a UEFA Cup place on goal difference. The club were knocked out of the Scottish Cup by Rangers in the fourth round, while the club became League Cup Winners for the first time defeating Aberdeen 3-0 in the Final replay at Dens Park after a goalless draw at Hampden. In the UEFA Cup, United were eliminated in the second round by Hungarian side Diósgyőri VTK.

Home colours	Away colours

Pos	Team	Pld	W	D	L	GF	GA	GD	Pts	Qualification or relegation
3	St Mirren	36	15	12	9	56	49	+7	42	Qualification for the UEFA Cup first round
4	Dundee United	36	12	13	11	43	30	+13	37	Qualification for the UEFA Cup first round
5	Rangers	36	15	7	14	50	46	+4	37	

Source: Statto and RSSSF
Rules for classification: 1) points; 2) goal difference; 3) number of goals scored.
