= David Potter =

David Potter may refer to:

- David Stone Potter (born 1957), historian of Greece and Rome at the University of Michigan
- David E. Potter (1943–2026), founder of Psion
- David M. Potter (1910–1971), American historian at Yale University
- David W. Potter (1948–2023), Scottish sports writer
- Gharlane of Eddore (1947–2001), pen name of David G. Potter
- David S. Potter (1925–2011), American politician and businessman
- Dave Potter (Vermont politician), see Members of the Vermont House of Representatives, 2007–2008 session
- Dave Potter (motorcyclist) (1950–1981), English motorcycle racer
- David Potter, American election candidate in Ohio's 13th congressional district
