= 1970–71 Scottish Football League =

Scottish football season

Statistics of Scottish Football League in season 1970/1971.

== Scottish League Division One ==
Aberdeen, with 15 straight wins of which the last 12 were without conceding, led the league from December until the last week of the season. Aberdeen faced Celtic in their penultimate game needing a win to almost certainly clinch the title, but could only draw 1-1: and then they lost their last game, at Falkirk, allowing Celtic to take the championship by 2 points.

Pos	Team	Pld	W	D	L	GF	GA	GD	Pts	Qualification or relegation
1	Celtic	34	25	6	3	89	23	+66	56	Champion
2	Aberdeen	34	24	6	4	68	18	+50	54	
3	St Johnstone	34	19	6	9	59	44	+15	44	
4	Rangers	34	16	9	9	58	34	+24	41	
5	Dundee	34	14	10	10	53	45	+8	38	
6	Dundee United	34	14	8	12	53	54	−1	36	
7	Falkirk	34	13	9	12	46	53	−7	35	
8	Morton	34	13	8	13	44	44	0	34	
9	Airdrieonians	34	13	8	13	60	65	−5	34	
10	Motherwell	34	13	8	13	43	47	−4	34	
11	Heart of Midlothian	34	13	7	14	41	40	+1	33	
12	Hibernian	34	10	10	14	47	53	−6	30	
13	Kilmarnock	34	10	8	16	43	67	−24	28	
14	Ayr United	34	9	8	17	37	54	−17	26	
15	Clyde	34	8	10	16	33	59	−26	26	
16	Dunfermline Athletic	34	6	11	17	44	56	−12	23	
17	St Mirren	34	7	9	18	38	56	−18	23	Relegated to 1971–72 Second Division
18	Cowdenbeath	34	7	3	24	33	69	−36	17	Relegated to 1971–72 Second Division

Source: Soccerbase and League Tables

== Scottish League Division Two ==
Pos	Team	Pld	W	D	L	GF	GA	GD	Pts	Promotion or relegation
1	Partick Thistle	36	23	10	3	78	26	+52	56	Promotion to the 1971–72 First Division
2	East Fife	36	22	7	7	86	44	+42	51	Promotion to the 1971–72 First Division
3	Arbroath	36	19	8	9	80	52	+28	46	
4	Dumbarton	36	19	6	11	87	46	+41	44	
5	Clydebank	36	17	8	11	57	43	+14	42	
6	Montrose	36	17	7	12	78	64	+14	41	
7	Albion Rovers	36	15	9	12	53	52	+1	39	
8	Raith Rovers	36	15	9	12	62	62	0	39	
9	Stranraer	36	14	8	14	54	52	+2	36	
10	Stenhousemuir	36	14	8	14	64	70	−6	36	
11	Queen of the South	36	13	9	14	50	56	−6	35	
12	Stirling Albion	36	12	8	16	61	61	0	32	
13	Queen's Park	36	13	4	19	51	72	−21	30	
14	Berwick Rangers	36	10	10	16	42	60	−18	30	
15	Forfar Athletic	36	9	11	16	63	75	−12	29	
16	Alloa Athletic	36	9	11	16	56	86	−30	29	
17	East Stirlingshire	36	9	9	18	57	86	−29	27	
18	Hamilton Academical	36	8	7	21	50	79	−29	23	
19	Brechin City	36	6	7	23	30	73	−43	19	

Source: "1970-1971 Second Division - SPFL Archive". SPFL.

== See also ==
- 1970–71 in Scottish football
