= Charlie Gallagher (footballer, born 1940) =

Irish footballer (1940–2021)

Personal information
- Full name: Charles Gallagher
- Date of birth: 3 November 1940
- Place of birth: Glasgow, Scotland
- Date of death: 11 July 2021 (aged 80)
- Position: Inside forward

Senior career*
Years	Team	Apps	(Gls)
1958–1959	Yoker Athletic		
1959–1970	Celtic	106	(17)
1970–1973	Dumbarton	70	(29)

International career
1967	Republic of Ireland	2	(0)
- * Club domestic league appearances and goals

Charles Gallagher (3 November 1940 – 11 July 2021) was a footballer who played as an inside forward. At club level he played mainly for Celtic, as well as Dumbarton. Born in Scotland, he represented the Republic of Ireland at international level, making two appearances for the team in 1967. He was a member of the renowned Lisbon Lions team that won the European Cup in May 1967.

== Early life ==
Gallagher was born in Glasgow on 3 November 1940. His parents came from County Donegal, Ireland and one of his cousins, Paddy Crerand, also played for Celtic. Gallagher first played football for St. John's (Gorbals) Boys' Guild in 1952 and Holyrood Senior Secondary the following year. He went on to play for Kilmarnock Amateurs in 1955 and Yoker Athletic in 1958. John Murphy, his secondary school physical education teacher who also served as an announcer at Parkhead on match days, recommended him to Celtic.

== Professional career ==
Gallagher made his debut for Celtic on 22 August 1958 during a 1–0 victory over Raith Rovers F.C. in the Scottish League Cup. He then made his full debut on 6 March the following year, when Jock Stein signed him as to a professional contract that same day. Gallagher took the corner kick that resulted in Billy McNeill's winning goal in the final of the 1965 Scottish Cup. Two years later, he was made captain for a Scottish Cup game against Elgin City. This was in tribute to his accomplishment of playing for the Republic of Ireland, becoming the first player born in Scotland to represent the team when he played against Turkey on 22 February 1967. Gallagher was part of the Lisbon Lions squad that won the European Cup Final that same year, which saw him score four goals in the run-up to the final. Although he did not start in the final, the club maintained that he "has always been rightly acknowledged as part of the Lisbon Lions squad".

Gallagher played for Celtic for over a decade, making a total of 171 appearances and scoring 32 goals. This included 106 Scottish League appearances and 17 league goals. He also played in 13 European games. He stayed with the club until 1 May 1970, when he signed for Dumbarton. He scored 40 goals in 95 games for the club, and won the Division Two championship in 1971–72, before retiring from professional football in April 1973. Gallagher subsequently worked as a scout for Celtic from 1976 to 1978. He was later employed as a taxi driver.

== Personal life ==
Gallagher resided in Bishopbriggs with his wife Maryrose. Together, they had three children: Paul, Kieron, and Claire. His biography Charlie Gallagher? What A Player, authored by David W. Potter, was released in 2016.

Gallagher died on 11 July 2021, at the age of 80.

== Honours ==
Celtic

- European Cup: 1966–67
- Scottish League: 1965–66, 1966–67, 1967–68
- Scottish Cup: 1965
- Scottish League Cup: 1965

Dumbarton

- Scottish Division Two: 1971–72

== See also ==
- List of Republic of Ireland international footballers born outside the Republic of Ireland
