= 1970–71 Scottish Division Two =

Scottish Second Division
- Season: 1970–71
- Champions: Partick Thistle
- Promoted: Partick Thistle; East Fife

The 1970–71 Scottish Second Division was won by Partick Thistle who, along with second placed East Fife, were promoted to the First Division. Brechin City finished bottom.

== Table ==
| Pos | Team | Pld | W | D | L | GF | GA | GD | Pts | Promotion or relegation |
|---|---|---|---|---|---|---|---|---|---|---|
| 1 | Partick Thistle | 36 | 23 | 10 | 3 | 78 | 26 | +52 | 56 | Promotion to the 1971–72 First Division |
| 2 | East Fife | 36 | 22 | 7 | 7 | 86 | 44 | +42 | 51 | Promotion to the 1971–72 First Division |
| 3 | Arbroath | 36 | 19 | 8 | 9 | 80 | 52 | +28 | 46 | |
| 4 | Dumbarton | 36 | 19 | 6 | 11 | 87 | 46 | +41 | 44 | |
| 5 | Clydebank | 36 | 17 | 8 | 11 | 57 | 43 | +14 | 42 | |
| 6 | Montrose | 36 | 17 | 7 | 12 | 78 | 64 | +14 | 41 | |
| 7 | Albion Rovers | 36 | 15 | 9 | 12 | 53 | 52 | +1 | 39 | |
| 8 | Raith Rovers | 36 | 15 | 9 | 12 | 62 | 62 | 0 | 39 | |
| 9 | Stranraer | 36 | 14 | 8 | 14 | 54 | 52 | +2 | 36 | |
| 10 | Stenhousemuir | 36 | 14 | 8 | 14 | 64 | 70 | −6 | 36 | |
| 11 | Queen of the South | 36 | 13 | 9 | 14 | 50 | 56 | −6 | 35 | |
| 12 | Stirling Albion | 36 | 12 | 8 | 16 | 61 | 61 | 0 | 32 | |
| 13 | Queen's Park | 36 | 13 | 4 | 19 | 51 | 72 | −21 | 30 | |
| 14 | Berwick Rangers | 36 | 10 | 10 | 16 | 42 | 60 | −18 | 30 | |
| 15 | Forfar Athletic | 36 | 9 | 11 | 16 | 63 | 75 | −12 | 29 | |
| 16 | Alloa Athletic | 36 | 9 | 11 | 16 | 56 | 86 | −30 | 29 | |
| 17 | East Stirlingshire | 36 | 9 | 9 | 18 | 57 | 86 | −29 | 27 | |
| 18 | Hamilton Academical | 36 | 8 | 7 | 21 | 50 | 79 | −29 | 23 | |
| 19 | Brechin City | 36 | 6 | 7 | 23 | 30 | 73 | −43 | 19 | |

Source: "1970-1971 Second Division - SPFL Archive". SPFL.
