= 1961–62 Dundee United F.C. season =

Dundee United
1961–62 season
- Chairman: J. Johnston-Grant
- Manager: Jerry Kerr
- Stadium: Tannadice Park
- Scottish First Division: 10th W13 D6 L15 F70 A71 P32
- Scottish Cup: Round 1
- League Cup: Group stage

The 1961–62 season was the 54th year of football played by Dundee United, and covers the period from 1 July 1961 to 30 June 1962. United finished in tenth place in the First Division.

== Match results ==
Dundee United played a total of 41 competitive matches during the 1961–62 season.

=== Legend ===
Win
Draw
Loss

All results are written with Dundee United's score first. Own goals in italics

=== First Division ===
Date	Opponent	Venue	Result	Attendance	Scorers
23 August 1961	Dunfermline Athletic	H	3-2	7,860	
9 September 1961	Dundee	A	1-4	18,765	
16 September 1961	St Johnstone	H	3-0	14,477	
23 September 1961	Celtic	A	1-3	23,379	
30 September 1961	Hibernian	H	4-0	7,785	
7 October 1961	Third Lanark	A	2-7	6,025	
14 October 1961	St Mirren	H	3-1	8,828	
21 October 1961	Kilmarnock	H	1-2	8,975	
28 October 1961	Raith Rovers	A	0-0	3,295	
4 November 1961	Airdrieonians	A	3-3	2,555	
11 November 1961	Stirling Albion	H	2-0	5,111	
18 November 1961	Motherwell	A	1-2	7,665	
25 November 1961	Rangers	H	2-3	19,728	
2 December 1961	Falkirk	A	2-1	3,471	
16 December 1961	Aberdeen	A	3-1	6,943	
23 December 1961	Partick Thistle	H	3-5	7,349	
6 January 1962	Dunfermline Athletic	A	1-4	6,643	
13 January 1962	Celtic	H	4-5	14,476	
17 January 1962	St Johnstone	A	2-1	3,415	
20 January 1962	Hibernian	A	2-3	6,829	
24 January 1962	Heart of Midlothian	A	1-2	6,456	
3 February 1962	Third Lanark	H	3-0	5,858	
10 February 1962	St Mirren	A	1-1	7,989	
21 February 1962	Kilmarnock	A	3-5	5,584	
24 February 1962	Raith Rovers	H	4-2	6,386	
3 March 1962	Airdrieonians	H	3-3	6,257	
14 March 1962	Stirling Albion	A	1-0	2,576	
17 March 1962	Motherwell	H	1-1	8,080	
24 March 1962	Rangers	A	1-0	34,008	
31 March 1962	Falkirk	H	4-1	5,910	
7 April 1962	Aberdeen	H	2-2	7,151	
9 April 1962	Dundee	H	1-2	21,138	
23 April 1962	Partick Thistle	A	2-4	4,116	
28 April 1962	Heart of Midlothian	H	0-1	3,795	

=== Scottish Cup ===
Date	Rd	Opponent	Venue	Result	Attendance	Scorers
13 December 1961	R1	Motherwell	A	0-4	8,557	

=== League Cup ===
Date	Rd	Opponent	Venue	Result	Attendance	Scorers
12 August 1961	G2	Motherwell	A	3-5	11,241	
16 August 1961	G2	Dunfermline Athletic	H	0-0	10,615	
19 August 1961	G2	Aberdeen	H	5-3	11,616	
26 August 1961	G2	Motherwell	H	0-2	12,774	
30 August 1961	G2	Dunfermline Athletic	A	0-3	6,334	
2 September 1961	G2	Aberdeen	A	2-2	6,818	

== See also ==
- 1961–62 in Scottish football
