= 1965–66 Dundee United F.C. season =

Dundee United
1965–66 season
- Chairman: J. Johnston-Grant
- Manager: Jerry Kerr
- Stadium: Tannadice Park
- Scottish First Division: 5th W19 D5 L10 F79 A51 P43
- Scottish Cup: Round 2
- League Cup: Group stage

The 1965–66 season was the 57th year of football played by Dundee United, and covers the period from 1 July 1965 to 30 June 1966. United finished in fifth place in the First Division.

== Match results ==
Dundee United played a total of 43 competitive matches during the 1965–66 season.

=== Legend ===
Win
Draw
Loss

All results are written with Dundee United's score first. Own goals in italics

=== First Division ===
Date	Opponent	Venue	Result	Attendance	Scorers
25 August 1965	Celtic	H	0-4	16,585	
11 September 1965	Dundee	A	5-0	15,058	
18 September 1965	St Johnstone	H	5-1	7,968	
25 September 1965	St Mirren	A	2-1	2,802	
2 October 1965	Partick Thistle	H	5-2	7,050	
9 October 1965	Dunfermline Athletic	A	4-2	8,288	
16 October 1965	Hamilton Academical	H	7-0	6,914	
27 October 1965	Rangers	A	0-2	19,046	
30 October 1965	Greenock Morton	H	4-2	8,043	
6 November 1965	Heart of Midlothian	H	2-2	10,218	
13 November 1965	Falkirk	A	4-1	3,459	
20 November 1965	Motherwell	A	3-0	2,574	
27 November 1965	Clyde	H	0-2	7,061	
11 December 1965	Aberdeen	A	0-0	9,628	
18 December 1965	Kilmarnock	H	0-0	7,170	
25 December 1965	Stirling Albion	A	4-2	3,106	
3 January 1966	Dundee	H	2-1	21,325	
8 January 1966	Celtic	A	0-1	33,464	
15 January 1966	St Mirren	H	3-0	6,703	
22 January 1966	Partick Thistle	A	1-4	6,500	
29 January 1966	Dunfermline Athletic	H	0-4	8,981	
12 February 1966	Hamilton Academical	A	4-0	966	
26 February 1966	Greenock Morton	A	0-2	5,114	
12 March 1966	Falkirk	H	2-3	5,133	
16 March 1966	Heart of Midlothian	A	1-0	7,306	
19 March 1966	Motherwell	H	5-1	4,959	
21 March 1966	Rangers	H	1-0	14,815	
26 March 1966	Clyde	A	1-4	995	
30 March 1966	St Johnstone	A	2-1	6,184	
9 April 1966	Hibernian	H	5-4	4,706	
16 April 1966	Aberdeen	H	3-0	7,046	
20 April 1966	Hibernian	A	3-3	4,568	
23 April 1966	Kilmarnock	A	0-1	5,711	
30 April 1967	Stirling Albion	H	1-1	4,578	

=== Scottish Cup ===
Date	Rd	Opponent	Venue	Result	Attendance	Scorers
7 February 1966	R1	Falkirk	H	0-0	8,500	
16 February 1966	R1 R	Falkirk	A	2-1	7,000	
23 February 1966	R2	Aberdeen	A	0-5	41,500	

=== League Cup ===
Date	Rd	Opponent	Venue	Result	Attendance	Scorers
14 August 1965	G1	Celtic	H	2-1	23,503	
18 August 1965	G1	Dundee	A	0-0	23,095	
21 August 1965	G1	Motherwell	H	4-1	9,823	
28 August 1965	G1	Celtic	A	0-3	32,382	
1 September 1965	G1	Dundee	H	1-3	18,705	
4 September 1965	G1	Motherwell	A	2-3	3,368	

== See also ==
- 1965–66 in Scottish football
