= Glasgow Corporation Transport F.C. =

Former association football club in Scotland

Glasgow Corporation Transport
- Full name: Glasgow Corporation Transport Football Club
- Founded: 1923
- Dissolved: 1974
- Ground: Helenvale Park
Home colours

Glasgow Corporation Transport Football Club was a football club based in Glasgow, Scotland.

== History ==
The club was the works team for Glasgow Corporation Transport, the corporation which provided public transport in the city. The idea of having a club to represent the transport workers, whose depots had their own amateur league, seems to have been coincident with the idea of building an athletics venue for the workers; the club was founded the year before the ground was opened.

In 1930, the club joined the Scottish Football Association as an associate member, which entitled it to enter the Scottish Cup. It did so in 1930–31, losing in its first tie to Glasgow University F.C. The club did however win the Scottish Amateur Cup in 1931–32 and the West of Scotland Amateur Cup in 1935–36.

In 1966, the club became a full senior member. It joined the Combined Reserve Football League in 1967 and once again entered the Scottish Cup. The club's major success came when they qualified for the competition proper in 1970-71. The club received a bye in the first round and was drawn to play at Brechin City in the second, travelling to Brechin (as was usual for away matches) on a Glasgow Corporation bus. The club lost 4–1, two of the City goals coming from the penalty spot.

At the end of the season, the corporation handed the Helenvale ground over to Glasgow City Council; without its own ground, the club lost its senior status, and was wound up within a few years. By this time few of the players were Corporation employees.

The club was notable as the opposition for the final match Alex Ferguson played for Rangers in 1969, Ferguson having been demoted to the third XI after the 1969 Scottish Cup Final.

== Colours ==
The club played in royal blue shirts until 1931, when it changed to green shirts, white shorts, and orange socks, which matched the corporation's livery colours.

== Grounds ==
The club's home ground was Helenvale Park in Parkhead, converted from a series of bowling greens into an athletics track and football pitch, within a few dozen yards of Celtic Park. The ground's opening match was a friendly between Rangers and Partick Thistle, ceremonially kicked off by the Duke of York, later to become King George VI. The ground was used by Scottish Athletics for the national championships on several occasions.
