= 1959–60 Dundee United F.C. season =

Dundee United
1959–60 season
- Chairman: J. Johnston-Grant
- Manager: Jerry Kerr
- Stadium: Tannadice Park
- Scottish Second Division: 2nd W22 D6 L8 F90 A45 P50
- Scottish Cup: Round 2
- League Cup: Play off after group stage

The 1959–60 season was the 52nd year of football played by Dundee United, and covers the period from 1 July 1959 to 30 June 1960. United finished in second place in the Second Division and therefore promoted to the First Division.

== Match results ==
Dundee United played a total of 44 competitive matches during the 1959–60 season.

=== Legend ===
Win
Draw
Loss

All results are written with Dundee United's score first. Own goals in italics

=== Second Division ===
Date	Opponent	Venue	Result	Attendance	Scorers
19 August 1959	East Fife	A	3–1	2,500	
5 September 1959	St Johnstone	H	0–1	7,000	
9 September 1959	Dumbarton	A	3–1	3,000	
12 September 1959	Queen's Park	A	8–1	1,740	
19 September 1959	Stranraer	H	2–1	4,100	
23 September 1959	Dumbarton	H	2–1	3,000	
26 September 1959	Stenhousemuir	A	3–0	3,000	
3 October 1959	Brechin City	H	3–1	5,500	
10 October 1959	East Stirlingshire	A	0–1	1,500	
17 October 1959	Greenock Morton	A	1–1	4,000	
24 October 1959	Albion Rovers	H	0–0	25,000	
31 October 1959	Hamilton Academical	A	0–2	3,500	
7 November 1959	Cowdenbeath	A	2–1	1,000	
14 November 1959	Montrose	H	1–2	2,500	
21 November 1959	Alloa Athletic	H	2–1	2,200	
28 November 1959	Forfar Athletic	A	3–1	1,000	
5 December 1959	Queen of the South	H	4–3	4,100	
12 December 1959	Falkirk	H	1–0	3,100	
19 December 1959	Berwick Rangers	A	2–1	1,554	
26 December 1959	East Fife	H	6–0	5,500	
1 January 1960	St Johnstone	A	1–1	16,000	
2 January 1960	Queen's Park	H	3–1	9,500	
9 January 1960	Stranraer	A	0–3	1,200	
16 January 1960	Stenhousemuir	H	1–2	8,500	
23 January 1960	Brechin City	A	1–1	2,000	
30 January 1960	Cowdenbeath	H	2–3	3,000	
6 February 1960	East Stirlingshire	H	6–1	5,000	
20 February 1960	Greenock Morton	H	3–3	5,500	
27 February 1960	Albion Rovers	A	4–1	1,500	
5 March 1960	Hamilton Academical	H	5–1	11,300	
19 March 1960	Montrose	A	3–1	6,000	
26 March 1960	Alloa Athletic	A	2–3	6,000	
2 April 1960	Forfar Athletic	H	4–0	4,300	
16 April 1960	Queen of the South	A	4–4	7,000	
23 April 1960	Falkirk	A	2–1	7,000	
30 April 1960	Berwick Rangers	H	1–0	16,900	

=== Scottish Cup ===
Date	Rd	Opponent	Venue	Result	Attendance	Scorers
13 January 1960	R1	Partick Thistle	H	2–2	14,000	
17 January 1960	R1 R	Partick Thistle	A	1–4	9,500	

=== League Cup ===
Date	Rd	Opponent	Venue	Result	Attendance	Scorers
8 August 1959	G9	East Stirlingshire	A	2–0	5,600	
12 August 1959	G9	Montrose	A	1–1	2,500	
15 August 1959	G9	Stranraer	H	2–0	3,800	
29 August 1959	G9	Queen's Park	A	4–0	3,725	
31 August 1959	Play Off	Falkirk	A	1–1	8,000	
2 September 1959	Play Off	Falkirk	H	0–3	11,500	

== See also ==
- 1959–60 in Scottish football
