= Jock Stein Friendship Cup =

- Founded: 2006
- Abolished: 2019; 6 years ago
- Number of teams: 2
- Last champions: Celtic
- Most successful club(s): Celtic (9)

Jock Stein Friendship Cup was an exhibition football match held in Cliftonhill Stadium, Coatbridge, Scotland.

This competition was started to recognise the contribution of Jock Stein to both contestants, Albion Rovers and Celtic Stein began his senior footballing career with Albion Rovers in 1942, and in the 1950s played for several years with Celtic, captaining the side to a league & cup double in 1954. He is most famous for his managerial career later on at Celtic.

While the principal aim of the Jock Stein Friendship Cup was to honour Stein's memory, the annual challenge match was also one of several initiatives aimed at raising awareness of Albion Rovers in the club's home town of Coatbridge. The club and the Albion Rovers Supporters Trust engaged with Coatbridge youths and families in various ways; notably through summer coaching sessions and a Christmas Party for local children, and the promotion of awareness-raising initiatives such as the Kick-Out Bigotry campaign.

Celtic usually played its XI team, often composed mainly of reserves or U19 players, and won each of the nine challenge matches, although two finals were drawn at full-time and went to penalty kicks.

== Winners ==
Year	Champions	Runner-up	Score	Refs
2006	Celtic	Albion Rovers	3–2	
2007	Celtic	Albion Rovers	1–1; 4–2 (ps)	
2008	Celtic	Albion Rovers	4–1	
2009	Celtic	Albion Rovers	0–0; 5–4 (ps)	
2010	Celtic	Albion Rovers	3–3; 5–4 (ps)	
2016	Celtic	Albion Rovers	1–0	
2017	Celtic	Albion Rovers	7–0	
2018	Celtic	Albion Rovers	8–0	
2019	Celtic	Albion Rovers	3–0	
