= 1963–64 Dundee United F.C. season =

Dundee United
1963–64 season
- Chairman: J. Johnston-Grant
- Manager: Jerry Kerr
- Stadium: Tannadice Park
- Scottish First Division: 8th W13 D8 L13 F65 A49 P34
- Scottish Cup: Round 1
- League Cup: Group stage
- Summer Cup: Group stage

The 1963–64 season was the 56th year of football played by Dundee United, and covers the period from 1 July 1963 to 30 June 1964. United finished in eighth place in the First Division.

== Match results ==
Dundee United played a total of 48 competitive matches during the 1963–64 season.

=== Legend ===
Win
Draw
Loss

All results are written with Dundee United's score first. Own goals in italics

=== First Division ===
Date	Opponent	Venue	Result	Attendance	Scorers
21 August 1963	St Mirren	A	1-2	5,858	
7 September 1963	St Johnstone	H	3-1	10,924	
14 September 1963	Dundee	A	1-1	20,945	
21 September 1963	East Stirlingshire	H	2-0	8,167	
28 September 1963	Dunfermline Athletic	A	2-4	7,880	
5 October 1963	Airdireonians	H	9-1	7,129	
12 October 1963	Partick Thistle	A	0-1	6,150	
19 October 1963	Celtic	H	0-3	14,345	
26 October 1963	Motherwell	A	3-0	5,061	
2 November 1963	Falkirk	H	3-1	6,974	
9 November 1963	Kilmarnock	A	0-2	7,214	
16 November 1963	Heart of Midlothian	H	0-0	8,170	
23 November 1963	Third Lanark	H	3-1	5,530	
30 November 1963	Queen of the South	A	1-1	3,565	
7 December 1963	Rangers	H	2-3	18,735	
14 December 1963	Aberdeen	H	1-2	8,559	
21 December 1963	Hibernian	A	3-2	7,498	
28 December 1963	St Mirren	H	6-2	6,935	
1 January 1964	St Johnstone	A	2-2	11,281	
2 January 1964	Dundee	H	2-1	21,255	
4 January 1964	East Stirlingshire	A	1-1	1,692	
18 January 1964	Dunfermline Athletic	H	1-2	6,792	
1 February 1964	Airdrieonians	A	1-3	2,633	
8 February 1964	Partick Thistle	H	1-2	7,632	
19 February 1964	Celtic	A	0-1	10,009	
22 February 1964	Motherwell	H	4-1	7,909	
29 February 1964	Falkirk	A	1-2	4,888	
11 March 1964	Kilmarnock	H	2-1	7,916	
14 March 1964	Heart of Midlothian	A	4-0	7,060	
21 March 1964	Third Lanark	A	2-2	1,876	
28 March 1964	Queen of the South	H	2-1	3,550	
4 April 1964	Rangers	A	0-2	27,912	
18 April 1964	Aberdeen	A	0-0	4,002	
24 April 1964	Hibernian	H	1-1	3,278	

=== Scottish Cup ===
Date	Rd	Opponent	Venue	Result	Attendance	Scorers
11 January 1964	R1	St Mirren	H	0-0	11,920	
15 January 1964	R1 R	St Mirren	A	1-2	13,050	

=== League Cup ===
Date	Rd	Opponent	Venue	Result	Attendance	Scorers
10 August 1963	G2	Aberdeen	H	1-1	14,028	
14 August 1963	G2	Hibernian	A	2-3	9,759	
17 August 1963	G2	St Mirren	A	2-3	5,858	
24 August 1963	G2	Aberdeen	A	0-2	12,918	
28 August 1963	G2	Hibernian	H	2-4	11,250	
31 August 1963	G2	St Mirren	H	3-2	4,365	

=== Summer Cup ===
Date	Rd	Opponent	Venue	Result	Attendance	Scorers
2 May 1964	G2	Dundee	H	0-0		
6 May 1964	G2	St Johnstone	A	1-0		
9 May 1964	G2	Aberdeen	H	4-1		
13 May 1964	G2	Dundee	A	3-3		
16 May 1964	G2	St Johnstone	H	1-0		
20 May 1964	G2	Aberdeen	A	0-5		

== See also ==
- 1963–64 in Scottish football
