= 1966–67 Dundee United F.C. season =

Dundee United
1966–67 season
- Chairman: J. Johnston-Grant
- Manager: Jerry Kerr
- Stadium: Tannadice Park
- Scottish First Division: 9th W14 D9 L11 F68 A62 P37
- Scottish Cup: Semi-finalists
- League Cup: Group stage
- Inter-Cities Fairs Cup: Round 3

The 1966–67 season was the 58th year of football played by Dundee United, and covers the period from 1 July 1966 to 30 June 1967. United finished in ninth place in the First Division.

== Match results ==
Dundee United played a total of 48 competitive matches during the 1966–67 season.

=== Legend ===
Win
Draw
Loss

All results are written with Dundee United's score first. Own goals in italics

=== First Division ===
Date	Opponent	Venue	Result	Attendance	Scorers
10 September 1966	St Johnstone	A	0–2	3,612	
17 September 1966	Dundee	H	1–4	10,198	
24 September 1966	Ayr United	A	7–0	5,233	
1 October 1966	Rangers	H	2–3	14,323	
8 October 1966	Stirling Albion	A	1–4	2,979	
15 October 1966	Clyde	H	4–3	6,261	
22 October 1966	Hibernian	A	2–2	3,854	
29 October 1966	Dunfermline Athletic	H	2–4	8,948	
5 November 1966	Airdrieonians	A	2–2	2,551	
12 November 1966	Kilmarnock	H	1–1	6,278	
19 November 1966	Motherwell	A	1–1	3,191	
26 November 1966	Aberdeen	H	1–3	9,860	
3 December 1966	Falkirk	A	3–0	2,113	
10 December 1966	Heart of Midlothian	A	1–2	8,857	
17 December 1966	St Mirren	H	2–2	3,537	
31 December 1966	Celtic	H	3–2	18,577	
2 January 1967	St Johnstone	H	1–0	10,312	
3 January 1967	Dundee	A	3–2	17,286	
7 January 1967	Ayr United	H	4–0	5,094	
14 January 1967	Rangers	A	1–3	33,085	
21 January 1967	Stirling Albion	H	2–0	3,706	
4 February 1967	Clyde	A	0–2	4,287	
11 February 1967	Hibernian	H	1–3	9,200	
25 February 1967	Dunfermline Athletic	A	3–3	6,596	
4 March 1967	Airdrieonians	H	3–1	4,645	
18 March 1967	Motherwell	H	1–1	4,869	
20 March 1967	Kimarnock	A	0–4	4,719	
25 March 1967	Aberdeen	A	1–0	14,352	
5 April 1967	Falkirk	H	4–4	1,815	
8 April 1967	Heart of Midlothian	H	2–0	3,865	
12 April 1967	St Mirren	A	1–0	2,500	
22 April 1967	Partick Thistle	H	2–2	3,332	
3 May 1967	Celtic	A	3–2	40,741	
6 May 1967	Partick Thistle	A	0–3	1,109	

=== Scottish Cup ===
Date	Rd	Opponent	Venue	Result	Attendance	Scorers
28 January 1967	R1	Heart of Midlothian	A	3–0	17,139	
18 February 1967	R2	Falkirk	H	1–0	11,000	
11 March 1967	QF	Dunfermline Athletic	H	1–0	18,000	
1 April 1967	SF	Aberdeen	N	0–1	41,500	

=== League Cup ===
Date	Rd	Opponent	Venue	Result	Attendance	Scorers
13 August 1966	G4	Dundee	H	2–0	13,867	
17 August 1966	G4	St Johnstone	A	5–0	5,692	
20 August 1966	G4	Aberdeen	A	4–1	10,392	
27 August 1966	G4	Dundee	A	1–1	10,087	
31 August 1966	G4	St Johnstone	H	5–3	3,497	
3 September 1966	G4	Aberdeen	H	3–4	6,224	

=== Inter-Cities Fairs Cup ===
Date	Rd	Opponent	Venue	Result	Attendance	Scorers
25 October 1966	R2 1	(Spain) Barcelona	A	2–1	22,459	
16 November 1966	R2 2	(Spain) Barcelona	H	2–0	28,000	
8 February 1967	R3 1	(Italy) Juventus	A	0–3	6,800	
8 March 1967	R3 2	(Italy) Juventus	H	1–0	27,245	

== See also ==
- 1966–67 in Scottish football
