= 1970–71 Scottish Cup =

Tournament details
- Country: Scotland

Final positions
- Champions: Celtic
- Runners-up: Rangers

The 1970–71 Scottish Cup was the 86th staging of Scotland's most prestigious football knockout competition. The Cup was won by Celtic who defeated Rangers in the replayed final.

== First round ==
Home team	Score	Away team
Brechin City (2)	3 – 1	Nairn County (NL)
East Stirlingshire(2)	0 – 2	Clydebank (2)
Forfar Athletic (2)	2 – 0	Albion Rovers (2)
St Cuthbert Wanderers (NL)	1 – 3	Stranraer (2)
Stenhousemuir (2)	0 – 1	Elgin City (NL)

== Second round ==
Home team	Score	Away team
Brechin City (2)	4 – 1	Glasgow Corporation Transport (NL)
Clachnacuddin (NL)	2 – 1	Glasgow University (NL)
Clydebank (2)	2 – 1	Hamilton Academical (2)
Elgin City (NL)	2 – 0	Berwick Rangers (2)
Forfar Athletic (2)	1 – 0	Gala Fairydean (NL)
Queen's Park (2)	2 – 1	Montrose (2)
Ross County (NL)	1 – 4	East Fife (2)
Stranraer (2)	3 – 2	Dumbarton (2)

== Third round ==
Home team	Score	Away team
Aberdeen	5 – 0	Elgin City
Airdrieonians	1 – 1	Alloa Athletic
Celtic	5 – 1	Queen of the South
Clachnacuddin	0 – 3	Cowdenbeath
Clyde	2 – 0	Brechin City
Clydebank	0 – 0	Dundee United
Dundee	1 – 0	Partick Thistle
Dunfermline Athletic	3 – 1	Arbroath
East Fife	1 – 1	St Mirren
Hearts	3 – 0	Stranraer
Hibernian	8 – 1	Forfar Athletic
Greenock Morton	2 – 0	Ayr United
Queen's Park	0 – 1	Kilmarnock
Rangers	3 – 0	Falkirk
St Johnstone	2 – 2	Raith Rovers
Stirling Albion	3 – 1	Motherwell

=== Replays ===
Home team	Score	Away team
Dundee United	5 – 1	Clydebank
Alloa Athletic	0 – 2	Airdrieonians
Raith Rovers	4 – 3	St Johnstone
St Mirren	1 – 1	East Fife

=== Second Replays ===
Home team	Score	Away team
St Mirren	3 – 1	East Fife

== Fourth round ==
Home team	Score	Away team
Celtic	1 – 1	Dunfermline Athletic
Cowdenbeath	0 – 4	Airdrieonians
Dundee	2 – 0	Stirling Albion
Dundee United	1 – 1	Aberdeen
Hearts	1 – 2	Hibernian
Greenock Morton	1 – 2	Kilmarnock
Raith Rovers	1 – 1	Clyde
St Mirren	1 – 3	Rangers

=== Replays ===
Home team	Score	Away team
Aberdeen	2 – 0	Dundee United
Clyde	0 – 2	Raith Rovers
Dunfermline Athletic	0 – 1	Celtic

== Quarter-finals ==
Home team	Score	Away team
Celtic	7 – 1	Raith Rovers
Hibernian	1 – 0	Dundee
Kilmarnock	2 – 3	Airdrieonians
Rangers	1 – 0	Aberdeen

== Semi-finals ==
31 March 1971

Rangers	0–0	Hibernian

Hampden Park, Glasgow
Attendance: 69,429

3 April 1971

Celtic	3–3	Airdrieonians

Hampden Park, Glasgow
Attendance: 39,404

=== Replays ===
5 April 1971

Rangers	2–1	Hibernian

Hampden Park, Glasgow
Attendance: 54,435

7 April 1971

Celtic	2–0	Airdrieonians

Hampden Park, Glasgow
Attendance: 47,186

== Final ==
8 May 1971

Celtic	1–1	Rangers
Bobby Lennox	Report (page 3)	Derek Johnstone

Hampden Park, Glasgow
Attendance: 120,092
Referee: Tiny Wharton

=== Teams ===
CELTIC:
GK	(Scotland) Evan Williams
DF	(Scotland) Jim Craig
DF	(Scotland) Billy McNeill (c)
DF	(Scotland) George Connelly
DF	(Scotland) Jim Brogan
MF	(Scotland) Jimmy Johnstone
MF	(Scotland) David Hay
MF	(Scotland) Tommy Callaghan
MF	(Scotland) Bobby Lennox
FW	(Scotland) Harry Hood
FW	(Scotland) Willie Wallace
Substitutes:
FW	(Scotland) Lou Macari
Manager:
(Scotland) Jock Stein

RANGERS:
GK	(Scotland) Peter McCloy
DF	(Scotland) Alex Miller
DF	(Scotland) Colin Jackson
DF	(Scotland) Ronnie McKinnon (c)
DF	(Scotland) Willie Mathieson
MF	(Scotland) Willie Henderson
MF	(Scotland) Andy Penman	(substituted off) ?'
MF	(Scotland) John Greig
MF	(Scotland) Alex MacDonald
MF	(Scotland) Willie Johnston
FW	(Scotland) Colin Stein
Substitutes:
FW	(Scotland) Derek Johnstone	(substituted on) ?'
Manager:
(Scotland) Willie Waddell

=== Replay ===
12 May 1971

Celtic	2–1	Rangers
Harry Hood; Lou Macari	Report (page 6)	Jim Craig (o.g.)

Hampden Park, Glasgow
Attendance: 103,332
Referee: Tiny Wharton

==== Teams ====
CELTIC:
GK	(Scotland) Evan Williams
DF	(Scotland) Jim Craig
DF	(Scotland) Billy McNeill (c)
DF	(Scotland) George Connelly
DF	(Scotland) Jim Brogan
MF	(Scotland) Jimmy Johnstone
MF	(Scotland) David Hay
MF	(Scotland) Tommy Callaghan
MF	(Scotland) Bobby Lennox
FW	(Scotland) Harry Hood	(substituted off) ?'
FW	(Scotland) Lou Macari
Substitutes:
FW	(Scotland) Willie Wallace	(substituted on) ?'
Manager:
(Scotland) Jock Stein

RANGERS:
GK	(Scotland) Peter McCloy
DF	(Scotland) Jim Denny
DF	(Scotland) Colin Jackson
DF	(Scotland) Ronnie McKinnon (c)
DF	(Scotland) Willie Mathieson
MF	(Scotland) Willie Henderson
MF	(Scotland) Andy Penman	(substituted off) ?'
MF	(Scotland) John Greig
MF	(Scotland) Alex MacDonald
MF	(Scotland) Willie Johnston
FW	(Scotland) Colin Stein
Substitutes:
FW	(Scotland) Derek Johnstone	(substituted on) ?'
Manager:
(Scotland) Willie Waddell

== See also ==
- 1970–71 in Scottish football
- 1970–71 Scottish League Cup
