= Iain Fearn =

Scottish footballer

Personal information
- Full name: Iain Fearn
- Date of birth: 16 December 1949 (age 76)
- Position: Inside forward

Senior career*
Years	Team	Apps	(Gls)
1968–1971	Queen's Park	35	(4)
1971–1972	Hamilton	1	(0)
1971–1973	Dumbarton	4	(0)
1973–1974	Airdrie	19	(4)
- * Club domestic league appearances and goals

Iain Fearn (born 16 December 1949) was a Scottish footballer who played for Queen's Park, Hamilton, Dumbarton and Airdrie.
