= 1969–70 Scottish League Cup =

Tournament details
- Country: Scotland

Final positions
- Champions: Celtic
- Runners-up: St Johnstone

The 1969–70 Scottish League Cup was the twenty-fourth season of Scotland's second football knockout competition. The competition was won for the fifth successive season by Celtic, who defeated St Johnstone in the Final.

== First round ==
=== Group 1 ===
Team	Pld	W	D	L	GF	GA	GR	Pts
Celtic	6	5	0	1	21	5	4.200	10
Rangers	6	4	1	1	14	7	2.000	9
Raith Rovers	6	1	1	4	10	20	0.500	3
Airdrieonians	6	1	0	5	5	18	0.278	2

Home team	Score	Away team	Date
Celtic	6–1	Airdrieonians	9 August 1969
Raith Rovers	2–3	Rangers	9 August 1969
Airdrieonians	3–1	Raith Rovers	13 August 1969
Rangers	2–1	Celtic	13 August 1969
Airdrieonians	0–3	Rangers	16 August 1969
Celtic	5–0	Raith Rovers	16 August 1969
Celtic	1–0	Rangers	20 August 1969
Raith Rovers	2–1	Airdrieonians	20 August 1969
Airdrieonians	0–3	Celtic	23 August 1969
Rangers	3–3	Raith Rovers	23 August 1969
Raith Rovers	2–5	Celtic	27 August 1969
Rangers	3–0	Airdrieonians	27 August 1969

=== Group 2 ===
Team	Pld	W	D	L	GF	GA	GR	Pts
Aberdeen	6	2	4	0	8	4	2.000	8
Hibernian	6	2	2	2	10	9	1.111	6
Dunfermline Athletic	6	1	3	2	5	6	0.833	5
Clyde	6	1	3	2	4	8	0.500	5

Home team	Score	Away team	Date
Aberdeen	2–2	Dunfermline Athletic	9 August 1969
Hibernian	4–1	Clyde	9 August 1969
Clyde	0–0	Aberdeen	13 August 1969
Dunfermline Athletic	3–1	Hibernian	13 August 1969
Aberdeen	2–2	Hibernian	16 August 1969
Dunfermline Athletic	0–0	Clyde	16 August 1969
Aberdeen	3–0	Clyde	20 August 1969
Hibernian	2–0	Dunfermline Athletic	20 August 1969
Clyde	3–1	Hibernian	23 August 1969
Dunfermline Athletic	0–1	Aberdeen	23 August 1969
Clyde	0–0	Dunfermline Athletic	27 August 1969
Hibernian	0–0	Aberdeen	27 August 1969

=== Group 3 ===
Team	Pld	W	D	L	GF	GA	GR	Pts
St Johnstone	6	6	0	0	22	6	3.667	12
Kilmarnock	6	3	1	2	12	5	2.400	7
Dundee	6	2	1	3	7	6	1.167	5
Partick Thistle	6	0	0	6	1	25	0.040	0

Home team	Score	Away team	Date
Partick Thistle	0–2	Kilmarnock	9 August 1969
St Johnstone	3–1	Dundee	9 August 1969
Dundee	4–0	Partick Thistle	13 August 1969
Kilmarnock	2–3	St Johnstone	13 August 1969
Dundee	0–0	Kilmarnock	16 August 1969
Partick Thistle	1–8	St Johnstone	16 August 1969
Partick Thistle	0–1	Dundee	20 August 1969
St Johnstone	2–1	Kilmarnock	20 August 1969
Dundee	1–2	St Johnstone	23 August 1969
Kilmarnock	6–0	Partick Thistle	23 August 1969
Kilmarnock	1–0	Dundee	27 August 1969
St Johnstone	4–0	Partick Thistle	27 August 1969

=== Group 4 ===
Team	Pld	W	D	L	GF	GA	GR	Pts
Morton	6	3	1	2	9	6	1.500	7
Heart of Midlothian	6	3	1	2	6	4	1.500	7
St Mirren	6	2	2	2	5	5	1.000	6
Dundee United	6	2	0	4	6	11	0.545	4

Home team	Score	Away team	Date
Dundee United	2–3	Heart of Midlothian	9 August 1969
St Mirren	1–1	Morton	9 August 1969
Heart of Midlothian	0–0	St Mirren	13 August 1969
Morton	4–1	Dundee United	13 August 1969
Heart of Midlothian	0–1	Morton	16 August 1969
St Mirren	0–1	Dundee United	16 August 1969
Dundee United	0–2	Morton	20 August 1969
St Mirren	1–0	Heart of Midlothian	20 August 1969
Heart of Midlothian	1–0	Dundee United	23 August 1969
Morton	1–2	St Mirren	23 August 1969
Dundee United	2–1	St Mirren	27 August 1969
Morton	0–2	Heart of Midlothian	27 August 1969

=== Group 5 ===
Team	Pld	W	D	L	GF	GA	GR	Pts
Motherwell	6	5	1	0	18	6	3.000	11
East Fife	6	2	2	2	9	7	1.286	6
Albion Rovers	6	1	2	3	7	13	0.538	4
Montrose	6	1	1	4	7	15	0.467	3

Home team	Score	Away team	Date
Albion Rovers	0–1	Montrose	9 August 1969
Motherwell	2–0	East Fife	9 August 1969
East Fife	1–1	Albion Rovers	13 August 1969
Montrose	1–4	Motherwell	13 August 1969
East Fife	4–1	Montrose	16 August 1969
Motherwell	5–1	Albion Rovers	16 August 1969
Albion Rovers	2–1	East Fife	19 August 1969
Motherwell	3–2	Montrose	20 August 1969
East Fife	0–0	Motherwell	23 August 1969
Montrose	1–1	Albion Rovers	23 August 1969
Albion Rovers	2–4	Motherwell	27 August 1969
Montrose	1–3	East Fife	27 August 1969

=== Group 6 ===
Team	Pld	W	D	L	GF	GA	GR	Pts
Ayr United	6	4	1	1	9	3	3.000	9
Queen of the South	6	4	0	2	11	9	1.222	8
East Stirlingshire	6	1	2	3	4	10	0.400	4
Queen's Park	6	1	1	4	9	11	0.818	3

Home team	Score	Away team	Date
Ayr United	2–0	Queen's Park	9 August 1969
Queen of the South	2–0	East Stirlingshire	9 August 1969
East Stirlingshire	0–1	Ayr United	13 August 1969
Queen's Park	1–4	Queen of the South	13 August 1969
Ayr United	4–1	Queen of the South	16 August 1969
Queen's Park	7–2	East Stirlingshire	16 August 1969
Ayr United	0–0	East Stirlingshire	20 August 1969
Queen of the South	2–1	Queen's Park	20 August 1969
East Stirlingshire	2–0	Queen of the South	23 August 1969
Queen's Park	0–1	Ayr United	23 August 1969
East Stirlingshire	0–0	Queen's Park	27 August 1969
Queen of the South	2–1	Ayr United	27 August 1969

=== Group 7 ===
Team	Pld	W	D	L	GF	GA	GR	Pts
Dumbarton	6	4	1	1	13	8	1.625	9
Cowdenbeath	6	2	2	2	13	14	0.929	6
Clydebank	6	2	1	3	9	10	0.900	5
Stranraer	6	0	4	2	10	13	0.769	4

Home team	Score	Away team	Date
Clydebank	1–3	Dumbarton	9 August 1969
Cowdenbeath	2–2	Stranraer	9 August 1969
Dumbarton	2–3	Cowdenbeath	13 August 1969
Stranraer	1–1	Clydebank	13 August 1969
Clydebank	3–1	Cowdenbeath	16 August 1969
Stranraer	2–2	Dumbarton	16 August 1969
Clydebank	3–2	Stranraer	20 August 1969
Cowdenbeath	2–3	Dumbarton	20 August 1969
Dumbarton	1–0	Clydebank	23 August 1969
Stranraer	3–3	Cowdenbeath	23 August 1969
Cowdenbeath	2–1	Clydebank	27 August 1969
Dumbarton	2–0	Stranraer	27 August 1969

=== Group 8 ===
Team	Pld	W	D	L	GF	GA	GR	Pts
Falkirk	6	4	1	1	15	10	1.500	9
Stirling Albion	6	3	0	3	16	12	1.333	6
Forfar Athletic	6	2	1	3	6	10	0.600	5
Arbroath	6	2	0	4	8	13	0.615	4

Home team	Score	Away team	Date
Arbroath	2–3	Stirling Albion	9 August 1969
Falkirk	3–1	Forfar Athletic	9 August 1969
Forfar Athletic	2–1	Arbroath	13 August 1969
Stirling Albion	2–3	Falkirk	13 August 1969
Falkirk	1–2	Arbroath	16 August 1969
Forfar Athletic	0–3	Stirling Albion	16 August 1969
Arbroath	1–0	Forfar Athletic	20 August 1969
Falkirk	4–3	Stirling Albion	20 August 1969
Forfar Athletic	1–1	Falkirk	23 August 1969
Stirling Albion	4–1	Arbroath	23 August 1969
Arbroath	1–3	Falkirk	27 August 1969
Stirling Albion	1–2	Forfar Athletic	27 August 1969

=== Group 9 ===
Team	Pld	W	D	L	GF	GA	GR	Pts
Brechin City	4	3	0	1	5	4	1.250	6
Alloa Athletic	4	2	1	1	7	7	1.000	5
Hamilton Academical	4	2	0	2	6	4	1.500	4
Berwick Rangers	4	1	1	2	6	6	1.000	3
Stenhousemuir	4	0	2	2	7	10	0.700	2

Home team	Score	Away team	Date
Alloa Athletic	0–3	Hamilton Academical	9 August 1969
Brechin City	1–0	Berwick Rangers	9 August 1969
Stenhousemuir	3–3	Alloa Athletic	12 August 1969
Hamilton Academical	1–2	Brechin City	13 August 1969
Berwick Rangers	2–0	Hamilton Academical	16 August 1969
Brechin City	2–1	Stenhousemuir	16 August 1969
Alloa Athletic	2–0	Brechin City	20 August 1969
Berwick Rangers	1–2	Alloa Athletic	23 August 1969
Hamilton Academical	2–0	Stenhousemuir	23 August 1969
Stenhousemuir	3–3	Berwick Rangers	26 August 1969

== Supplementary round ==
=== First leg ===
Home team	Score	Away team	Date
Brechin City	1–1	Dumbarton	1 September 1969

=== Second leg ===
Home team	Score	Away team	Date	Agg
Dumbarton	5–2	Brechin City	3 September 1969	6–3

== Quarter-finals ==
=== First leg ===
Home team	Score	Away team	Date
Aberdeen	0–0	Celtic	10 September 1969
Dumbarton	1–4	Ayr United	10 September 1969
Morton	3–0	Motherwell	10 September 1969
St Johnstone	5–1	Falkirk	10 September 1969

=== Second leg ===
Home team	Score	Away team	Date	Agg
Ayr United	1–0	Dumbarton	24 September 1969	5–1
Celtic	2–1	Aberdeen	24 September 1969	2–1
Falkirk	2–6	St Johnstone	24 September 1969	3–11
Motherwell	3–0	Morton	24 September 1969	3–3

=== Replay ===
Home team	Score	Away team	Date
Motherwell	1–0	Morton	30 September 1969 At Ibrox

== Semi-finals ==
=== Ties ===
Home team	Score	Away team	Date
St Johnstone	2–0	Motherwell	6 October 1969
Celtic	3–3	Ayr United	8 October 1969

=== Replay ===
Home team	Score	Away team	Date
Celtic	2–1	Ayr United	13 October 1969

== Final ==
25 October 1969

St Johnstone	0–1	Celtic
		Auld

Hampden Park, Glasgow
Attendance: 73,067
