= 1970–71 in Scottish football =

Division One champions
- Celtic

Division Two champions
- Partick Thistle

Scottish Cup winners
- Celtic

League Cup winners
- Rangers

Junior Cup winners
- Cambuslang Rangers

Teams in Europe
- Aberdeen, Celtic, Dundee United, Hibernian, Kilmarnock, Rangers

Scotland national team
- 1971 BHC, UEFA Euro 1972 qualifying

The 1970–71 season was the 98th season of competitive football in Scotland and the 74th season of Scottish league football.

== Scottish League Division One ==
Aberdeen, with a 15-game unbeaten run, led the league from December until the last week of the season. Aberdeen faced Celtic in their penultimate game, needing a win to almost certainly clinch the title, but could only draw 1–1 and then they lost their last game, at Falkirk, allowing Celtic to take the championship by 2 points.

| Pos | Team | Pld | W | D | L | GF | GA | GD | Pts | Qualification or relegation |
|---|---|---|---|---|---|---|---|---|---|---|
| 1 | Celtic | 34 | 25 | 6 | 3 | 89 | 23 | +66 | 56 | Champion |
| 2 | Aberdeen | 34 | 24 | 6 | 4 | 68 | 18 | +50 | 54 | |
| 3 | St Johnstone | 34 | 19 | 6 | 9 | 59 | 44 | +15 | 44 | |
| 4 | Rangers | 34 | 16 | 9 | 9 | 58 | 34 | +24 | 41 | |
| 5 | Dundee | 34 | 14 | 10 | 10 | 53 | 45 | +8 | 38 | |
| 6 | Dundee United | 34 | 14 | 8 | 12 | 53 | 54 | −1 | 36 | |
| 7 | Falkirk | 34 | 13 | 9 | 12 | 46 | 53 | −7 | 35 | |
| 8 | Morton | 34 | 13 | 8 | 13 | 44 | 44 | 0 | 34 | |
| 9 | Airdrieonians | 34 | 13 | 8 | 13 | 60 | 65 | −5 | 34 | |
| 10 | Motherwell | 34 | 13 | 8 | 13 | 43 | 47 | −4 | 34 | |
| 11 | Heart of Midlothian | 34 | 13 | 7 | 14 | 41 | 40 | +1 | 33 | |
| 12 | Hibernian | 34 | 10 | 10 | 14 | 47 | 53 | −6 | 30 | |
| 13 | Kilmarnock | 34 | 10 | 8 | 16 | 43 | 67 | −24 | 28 | |
| 14 | Ayr United | 34 | 9 | 8 | 17 | 37 | 54 | −17 | 26 | |
| 15 | Clyde | 34 | 8 | 10 | 16 | 33 | 59 | −26 | 26 | |
| 16 | Dunfermline Athletic | 34 | 6 | 11 | 17 | 44 | 56 | −12 | 23 | |
| 17 | St Mirren | 34 | 7 | 9 | 18 | 38 | 56 | −18 | 23 | Relegated to 1971–72 Second Division |
| 18 | Cowdenbeath | 34 | 7 | 3 | 24 | 33 | 69 | −36 | 17 | Relegated to 1971–72 Second Division |

Source: Soccerbase and League Tables

Champions: Celtic
Relegated: St Mirren, Cowdenbeath

== Scottish League Division Two ==
| Pos | Team | Pld | W | D | L | GF | GA | GD | Pts | Promotion or relegation |
|---|---|---|---|---|---|---|---|---|---|---|
| 1 | Partick Thistle | 36 | 23 | 10 | 3 | 78 | 26 | +52 | 56 | Promotion to the 1971–72 First Division |
| 2 | East Fife | 36 | 22 | 7 | 7 | 86 | 44 | +42 | 51 | Promotion to the 1971–72 First Division |
| 3 | Arbroath | 36 | 19 | 8 | 9 | 80 | 52 | +28 | 46 | |
| 4 | Dumbarton | 36 | 19 | 6 | 11 | 87 | 46 | +41 | 44 | |
| 5 | Clydebank | 36 | 17 | 8 | 11 | 57 | 43 | +14 | 42 | |
| 6 | Montrose | 36 | 17 | 7 | 12 | 78 | 64 | +14 | 41 | |
| 7 | Albion Rovers | 36 | 15 | 9 | 12 | 53 | 52 | +1 | 39 | |
| 8 | Raith Rovers | 36 | 15 | 9 | 12 | 62 | 62 | 0 | 39 | |
| 9 | Stranraer | 36 | 14 | 8 | 14 | 54 | 52 | +2 | 36 | |
| 10 | Stenhousemuir | 36 | 14 | 8 | 14 | 64 | 70 | −6 | 36 | |
| 11 | Queen of the South | 36 | 13 | 9 | 14 | 50 | 56 | −6 | 35 | |
| 12 | Stirling Albion | 36 | 12 | 8 | 16 | 61 | 61 | 0 | 32 | |
| 13 | Queen's Park | 36 | 13 | 4 | 19 | 51 | 72 | −21 | 30 | |
| 14 | Berwick Rangers | 36 | 10 | 10 | 16 | 42 | 60 | −18 | 30 | |
| 15 | Forfar Athletic | 36 | 9 | 11 | 16 | 63 | 75 | −12 | 29 | |
| 16 | Alloa Athletic | 36 | 9 | 11 | 16 | 56 | 86 | −30 | 29 | |
| 17 | East Stirlingshire | 36 | 9 | 9 | 18 | 57 | 86 | −29 | 27 | |
| 18 | Hamilton Academical | 36 | 8 | 7 | 21 | 50 | 79 | −29 | 23 | |
| 19 | Brechin City | 36 | 6 | 7 | 23 | 30 | 73 | −43 | 19 | |

Source: "1970-1971 Second Division - SPFL Archive". SPFL.

Promoted: Partick Thistle, East Fife

== Cup honours ==
| Competition | Winner | Score | Runner-up |
|---|---|---|---|
| Scottish Cup 1970–71 | Celtic | 2 – 1 (rep.) | Rangers |
| League Cup 1970–71 | Rangers | 1 – 0 | Celtic |
| Junior Cup | Cambuslang Rangers | 2 – 1 | Newtongrange Star |

== Other honours ==
=== National ===
| Competition | Winner | Score | Runner-up |
|---|---|---|---|
| Scottish Qualifying Cup – North | Inverness Caledonian | 4 – 2 * † | Elgin City |
| Scottish Qualifying Cup – South | St Cuthbert Wanderers | 5 – 3 * | Burntisland Shipyard |

=== County ===
| Competition | Winner | Score | Runner-up |
|---|---|---|---|
| Aberdeenshire Cup | Peterhead | | |
| Ayrshire Cup | Ayr United | 2 – 2 * ‡ | Kilmarnock |
| East of Scotland Shield | Hibernian | 1 – 0 | Hearts |
| Fife Cup | Cowdenbeath | 2 – 0 * | Dunfermline Athletic |
| Forfarshire Cup | Dundee | 2 – 0 | Dundee United |
| Lanarkshire Cup | Airdrie | | Motherwell |
| Stirlingshire Cup | Stenhousemuir | 3 – 2 | East Stirling |

^{*} – aggregate over two legs
† – play off
‡ – won on penalties

=== Highland League ===
Top Three
| Pos | Team | Pld | W | D | L | GF | GA | GD | Pts |
|---|---|---|---|---|---|---|---|---|---|
| 1 | Inverness Caledonian | 30 | 23 | 5 | 2 | 92 | 32 | +60 | 51 |
| 2 | Inverness Thistle | 30 | 20 | 6 | 4 | 115 | 41 | +74 | 46 |
| 3 | Peterhead | 30 | 19 | 7 | 4 | 98 | 45 | +53 | 45 |

== Individual honours ==
| Award | Winner | Club |
|---|---|---|
| Footballer of the Year | (Scotland) Martin Buchan | Aberdeen |

== Scotland national team ==
| Date | Venue | Opponents | Score | Competition | Scotland scorer(s) |
|---|---|---|---|---|---|
| 11 November | Hampden Park, Glasgow (H) | Denmark | 1–0 | ECQG5 | John O'Hare |
| 3 February | Stade Sclessin, Liège (A) | Belgium | 0–3 | ECQG5 | |
| 21 April | Estadio da Luz, Lisbon (A) | Portugal | 0–2 | ECQG5 | |
| 15 May | Ninian Park, Cardiff (A) | Wales | 0–0 | BHC | |
| 18 May | Hampden Park, Glasgow (H) | Northern Ireland | 0–1 | BHC | |
| 22 May | Wembley Stadium, London (A) | England | 1–3 | BHC | Hugh Curran |
| 9 June | Idraetsparken, Copenhagen (A) | Denmark | 0–1 | ECQG5 | |
| 14 June | Lenin Stadium, Moscow (A) | Soviet Union | 0–1 | Friendly | |

Key:

- (H) = Home match
- (A) = Away match
- ECQG5 = European Championship qualifying – Group 5
- BHC = British Home Championship
