= 1969–70 Scottish Division Two =

Scottish Second Division
- Season: 1969–70
- Champions: Falkirk
- Promoted: Falkirk; Cowdenbeath

The 1969–70 Scottish Second Division was won by Falkirk who, along with second placed Cowdenbeath, were promoted to the First Division. Hamilton Academical finished bottom.

== Table ==
Pos	Team	Pld	W	D	L	GF	GA	GD	Pts	Promotion or relegation
1	Falkirk	36	25	6	5	94	34	+60	56	Promotion to the 1970–71 First Division
2	Cowdenbeath	36	24	7	5	81	35	+46	55	Promotion to the 1970–71 First Division
3	Queen of the South	36	22	6	8	72	49	+23	50	
4	Stirling Albion	36	18	10	8	70	40	+30	46	
5	Arbroath	36	20	4	12	76	39	+37	44	
6	Alloa Athletic	36	19	5	12	62	41	+21	43	
7	Dumbarton	36	17	6	13	55	46	+9	40	
8	Montrose	36	15	7	14	57	55	+2	37	
9	Berwick Rangers	36	15	5	16	67	55	+12	35	
10	East Fife	36	15	4	17	59	63	−4	34	
11	Albion Rovers	36	14	5	17	53	64	−11	33	
12	East Stirlingshire	36	14	5	17	58	75	−17	33	
13	Clydebank	36	10	10	16	47	65	−18	30	
14	Brechin City	36	11	6	19	47	74	−27	28	
15	Queen's Park	36	10	6	20	38	62	−24	26	
16	Stenhousemuir	36	10	6	20	47	89	−42	26	
17	Stranraer	36	9	7	20	56	75	−19	25	
18	Forfar Athletic	36	11	1	24	55	83	−28	23	
19	Hamilton Academical	36	8	4	24	42	92	−50	20	

Source: "1969-1970 Second Division - SPFL Archive". SPFL.
