= John Jamieson (footballer) =

Scottish footballer

Personal information
- Full name: John Jamieson
- Date of birth: 19 February 1944 (age 82)
- Position: Midfielder

Senior career*
Years	Team	Apps	(Gls)
1963–1965	Berwick Rangers	38	(0)
1965–1970	Albion Rovers	139	(2)
1969–1970	Dumbarton	25	(2)
1970–1976	Stenhousemuir	151	(4)
1975–1976	Hamilton Academical	3	(0)

Managerial career
- Shotts Bon Accord
- * Club domestic league appearances and goals

John Jamieson (born 19 February 1944) is a Scottish footballer, who played for Berwick Rangers, Albion Rovers, Dumbarton, Stenhousemuir and Hamilton Academical.

After leaving Hamilton, Jamieson managed junior club Shotts Bon Accord.
