= Brian Goodwin (footballer) =

Scottish footballer

Personal information
- Date of birth: 20 October 1949 (age 77)
- Position: Forward

Youth career
- Blantyre Vics Celtic fc

Senior career*
Years	Team	Apps	(Gls)
1967–1968	Chelsea		
1968–1971	Hamilton Academical	67	(17)
1970–1972	Dumbarton	10	(1)
1971–1972	Stranraer	1	(0)
- * Club domestic league appearances and goals

Brian Goodwin (born 10 October 1949) is a Scottish former footballer who played for Chelsea, Hamilton Academical, Dumbarton and Stranraer.
