= Eddie Ferguson =

Scottish footballer

Personal information
- Full name: Edward Brodie Ferguson
- Date of birth: 10 September 1949 (age 77)
- Place of birth: Whitburn, Scotland
- Position: Midfielder

Youth career
- Tynecastle Athletic

Senior career*
Years	Team	Apps	(Gls)
1967–1969	Dunfermline Athletic	3	(0)
1969–1971	Dumbarton	47	(7)
1971–1974	Rotherham United	67	(5)
1971	→ Grimsby Town (loan)	2	(0)
- * Club domestic league appearances and goals

Edward Brodie Ferguson (born 10 September 1949) was a Scottish footballer who played for Dunfermline Athletic, Dumbarton and Rotherham United. In 1974, he emigrated to South Africa where he played for Cape Town City for eight seasons.
