= Brian Gallagher (footballer) =

Scottish footballer

Personal information
- Full name: Brian Gallagher
- Date of birth: 18 December 1945 (age 80)
- Place of birth: Scotland
- Height: 5 ft 8 in (1.73 m)
- Position: Forward

Youth career
- Drumchapel Amateurs

Senior career*
Years	Team	Apps	(Gls)
1964–1969	Partick Thistle	38	(9)
1969–1970	Morton	12	(1)
1970–1972	Dumbarton	41	(8)
- * Club domestic league appearances and goals

Brian Gallagher (born 18 December 1945) is a Scottish former footballer who played for Partick Thistle, Morton and Dumbarton.
