= David W. Potter =

Scottish sports writer (1948–2023)

David William Potter
- Born: 29 August 1948; Forfar, Scotland
- Died: 29 July 2023 (aged 74); Kirkcaldy, Scotland
- Education: University of St Andrews
- Occupation: Sportswriter
- Years active: 1996–2023

David W. Potter (29 August 1948 – 29 July 2023) was a Scottish sports writer who published over seventy books, primarily on Scottish football and cricket.

== Career ==
David Potter taught Spanish and Classics at Glenrothes High School from 1971 – 2003 and then taught classics part-time at Osborne House School in Dysart.

Potter commentated on football matches for Kirkcaldy's hospital radio service and also wrote for the programmes of Celtic, Forfar Athletic and Raith Rovers football clubs. He umpired cricket matches in the summer and was the scorer for Falkland Cricket Club. His other passion was drama and he wrote a history of Kirkcaldy's Auld Kirk Players.

David Potter published his first book in 1996. Titled Our Bhoys Have Won the Cup!, it was published when Celtic had won the Scottish Cup for the thirtieth time. In 2004 he published a biography of footballer Bobby Murdoch. Of the 71 books in his bibliography, 35 are about Celtic Football Club and/or its players. Three are about Forfar Athletic and/or its players and two are about his home town of Forfar. There are eight books about cricket.

== Personal life and death ==
Potter lived with his wife Rosemary in Kirkcaldy. He died from cancer on 29 July 2023, at the age of 74.

== Bibliography ==
- Our Bhoys Have Won the Cup!, John Donald, 1996, ISBN 978-0-85976-454-4
- Jock Stein - The Celtic Years (with Tom Campbell), Mainstream, 1999, ISBN 978-1-84018-241-5
- The Encyclopaedia of Scottish Cricket, Empire, 1999, ISBN 978-1-901746-07-5
- The Mighty Atom - The Life and Times of Patsy Gallacher, Parrs Wood Press, 2000, ISBN 978-1-903158-10-4
- Wee Troupie: The Alex Troup Story, Tempus, 2002, ISBN 978-0-7524-2411-8
- Celtic in the League Cup, The History Press, 2002, ISBN 978-0-7524-2435-4
- Willie Maley - The Man Who Made Celtic, Tempus, 2003, ISBN 978-0-7524-3229-8
- Walk On - Celtic Since McCann, Fort, 2003, ISBN 978-0-9544461-5-4
- Bobby Murdoch, Different Class (with Billy McNeil), Empire, 2004, ISBN 978-1-901746-32-7
- Wizards and Bravehearts, A History of the Scottish National Side, Tempus, 2004, ISBN 0-7524-3183-8
- Ten Days That Shook Celtic (with nine others), Fort, 2005, ISBN 978-0954743154
- The Mighty Quinn - Jimmy Quinn, Celtic's First Goalscoring Hero, Tempus, 2005, ISBN 978-0-7524-3460-5
- Jimmy Delaney - The Stuff of Legend, Breedon, 2006, ISBN 978-1-85983-496-1
- 150 Not Out, Dunnikier Cricket Club 2006
- The Auld Kirk Players: 50 Years of Entertaining Kirkcaldy, 2007
- Celtic's Cult Heroes, Know the Score, 2008, ISBN 978-1-905449-08-8
- The Encyclopaedia of Scottish Football (with Phil H Jones), Know the Score, 2008, ISBN 978-1-84818-501-2
- Rovers Greats, Raith Trust 2008
- Celtic's Greatest Games, Know the Score, 2009, ISBN 978-1-84818-203-5
- Tommy McInally - Celtic's Bad Bhoy?, Black & White, 2009, ISBN 978-1-84502-260-0
- Scotland's Greatest Games, Know the Score, 2009, ISBN 978-1-84818-200-4
- Forfar Greats, Forfar Athletic FC 2009
- The Dear Old Paradise: The Changing Face of Celtic Park, Derby Books, 2010, ISBN 978-1-85983-791-7
- Newcastle's 50 Greatest Games, Derby Books, 2010, ISBN 978-1-85983-864-8
- A Long Innings, Kirkcaldy Cricket Club 2010
- Kirkcaldy's Parliamentarians, Kirkcaldy Civic Society 2010
- The Encyclopaedia of Scottish Football - Expanded Edition (with Phil H Jones), Pitch Publishing 2011, ISBN 978-19080-511-03
- Celtic FC Cult Heroes: The Bhoys Greatest Icons, Pitch Publishing 2011, ISBN 978-18481-8109-0
- The Celtic FC Miscellany, The History Press 2012, ISBN 978 0 7524 6462 6
- Celtic FC On This Day, Pitch Publishing 2012, ISBN 978-1-9080513-4-9
- Newcastle United On This Day, Pitch Publishing 2012, ISBN 978-1-9080519-0-5
- 125 Years of Competitive Matches (with Marie Rowan), Celtic FC 2012, ISBN 978 1 908925 29 9
- Jimmy McMenemy - Celtic Legend 1902-1920, JMD Media 2012, ISBN 1780911556
- Sunny Jim Young, Celtic Legend, D B Publishing 2013, ISBN 9781780913124
- Jimmy McMenemy: Celtic's Napoleon, DB Publishing 2013, ISBN 978-1-7809-1155-7
- 'Tis A Hundred Years Syne, Kirkcaldy in World War 1, Kirkcaldy Civic Society 2013.
- Never Mind The Hoops (Quiz Book), The History Press 2014, ISBN 978-0-7509-5223-1
- The Encyclopaedia of Scottish Football - Concise Edition (with Phil H Jones), Pitch Publishing 2014, ISBN 978-1-9096-2629-4
- Cricket in the East: The East of Scotland Cricket Association from 1953 until 2014, 2014
- Keeping in Paradise (with John Fallon), Black & White Publishing 2015, ISBN 978-1-84502-959-3
- Never Mind The Tartan Army (Quiz Book), The History Press 2015, ISBN 978-0-7509-6073-1
- Sandy McMahon & The Early Celts, DB Publishing 2015, ISBN 978-1-7809-1456-5
- Famous Kirkcaldy Men, Austin Macauley 2016, ISBN 978-1-7855-4982-3
- Celtic's Goalkeepers (with Marie Rowan), D B Publishing 2016, ISBN 978-1-78091-535-7
- I Remember 67 Well: Celtic's European Cup Year, Pitch Publishing 2016, ISBN 978-1-7853-1158-1
- Charlie Gallagher? - What A Player (with Stephen Cameron, Illustrator), CQN Books 2016, ISBN 978-0993436055
- The History of the Scottish Cup (with Phil H Jones), Pitch Publishing 2016, ISBN 978-1-7853-1214-4
- Forfar Athletic On This Day, Kennedy & Boyd 2017, ISBN 978-1-84921-166-6
- Celtic The Invincibles 2016-17, DB Publishing 2017, ISBN 978-1-78091-559-3
- Celtic - How The League Was Won 49 Times, DB Publishing 2018, ISBN 978-1-78091-574-6
- Raith Rovers On This Day, Kennedy & Boyd 2018, ISBN 978-1-84921-172-7
- Strathmore Cricket Union The First 90 Years - A History 1928-2018 (with Richard Miller and Gavin McKiddie) 2018
- Kirkcaldy On This Day, Kennedy & Boyd 2019, ISBN 978-1-84921-058-4
- East Fife On This Day, Kennedy & Boyd 2019, ISBN 978-1-84921-178-9
- 'Sivvy', R.W. Sievwright - Scotland's Greatest Cricketer? 2019
- Celtic v Rangers: The Bhoys Greatest Old Firm Victories, Pitch Publishing 2019, ISBN 978-1-78531-567-1
- Sixty Great Scottish Cricket Games, Kennedy & Boyd 2020, ISBN 978-1-84921-192-5
- The Scottish Cup: Celtic's Favourite Trophy, Pitch Publishing 2020, ISBN 978-1-78531-689-0
- Walfrid and The Bould Bhoys: Celtic's Founding Fathers, First Season & Early Stars (with Liam Kelly and Matt Corr), Celtic Star Books 2020, ISBN 978-1-8380207-1-2
- Dunfermline Athletic On This Day (with Gordon McKenzie), Kennedy & Boyd 2021, ISBN 978-1-84921-210-6
- Alec McNair - Celtic's Icicle, Celtic Star Books 2021, ISBN 978-1-8380207-2-9
- Forfar On This Day, Kennedy & Boyd 2021, ISBN 978-1-84921-219-9
- The Scottish League Cup - 75 Years - 1946-2021, Pitch Publishing 2022, ISBN 978-1-80150-056-2
- Willie Fernie: Putting On The Style (with John McCue), Celtic Star Books 2022, ISBN 978-1-8380207-4-3
- The Great Forfar Lock-Out of 1889, 2022
- The Benign Aristocrats - British Prime Ministers 1951-1964, Austin Macauley 2022, ISBN 978-1-52895-712-0
- The Celtic Rising - 1965: The Year Jock Stein Changed Everything, Celtic Star Books 2022, ISBN 978-1-83802-075-0
- Newcastle United: The Great Days 1904 to 1911, Pitch Publishing 2022, ISBN 978-1-80150-082-1
- The Troubled Tour: South Africa in England 1960, Pitch Publishing 2022, ISBN 978-1-80150-200-9
- Arbroath On This Day, Kennedy & Boyd 2022, ISBN 978-1-84921-232-8
- The Great Days of Sunderland, Pitch Publishing 2023, ISBN 978-1-80150-432-4
