= Jack Bolton =

Scottish footballer (1941–2021)

Personal information
- Full name: John McCaig Bolton
- Date of birth: 26 October 1941
- Place of birth: Lesmahagow,
- Date of death: 22 February 2021 (aged 79)
- Height: 6 ft 2 in (1.88 m)
- Position: Defender

Senior career*
Years	Team	Apps	(Gls)
1960–1963	Raith Rovers	18	(0)
1963–1966	Ipswich Town	69	(2)
1966–1967	Morton	18	(12)
1967–1971	Raith Rovers	69	(0)
1970–1973	Dumbarton	87	(0)
Total		261	(14)
- * Club domestic league appearances and goals

John McCaig Bolton (26 October 1941 – 22 February 2021) was a Scottish footballer who played for Raith Rovers (two spells), Ipswich Town, Morton and Dumbarton.
