= 1970–71 Scottish League Cup =

Tournament details
- Country: Scotland

Final positions
- Champions: Rangers
- Runners-up: Celtic

The 1970–71 Scottish League Cup was the twenty-fifth season of Scotland's second football knockout competition. The competition was won by Rangers, who defeated Celtic in the Final breaking a run of 5 successive wins in the preceding years.

== First round ==
=== Group 1 ===
Team	Pld	W	D	L	GF	GA	GD	Pts
Celtic	6	4	2	0	17	10	+7	10
Dundee United	6	1	5	0	8	7	+1	7
Clyde	6	1	2	3	8	15	−7	4
Heart of Midlothian	6	1	1	4	10	11	−1	3

Home team	Score	Away team	Date
Clyde	1–1	Dundee United	8 August 1970
Heart of Midlothian	1–2	Celtic	8 August 1970
Celtic	5–3	Clyde	12 August 1970
Dundee United	2–1	Heart of Midlothian	12 August 1970
Celtic	2–2	Dundee United	15 August 1970
Heart of Midlothian	1–2	Clyde	15 August 1970
Clyde	0–2	Celtic	19 August 1970
Heart of Midlothian	0–0	Dundee United	19 August 1970
Celtic	4–2	Heart of Midlothian	22 August 1970
Dundee United	1–1	Clyde	22 August 1970
Clyde	1–5	Heart of Midlothian	26 August 1970
Dundee United	2–2	Celtic	26 August 1970

=== Group 2 ===
Team	Pld	W	D	L	GF	GA	GD	Pts
Rangers	6	5	1	0	16	1	+15	11
Morton	6	3	1	2	8	8	0	7
Motherwell	6	2	1	3	8	8	0	5
Dunfermline Athletic	6	0	1	5	4	19	−15	1

Home team	Score	Away team	Date
Morton	1–4	Motherwell	8 August 1970
Rangers	4–1	Dunfermline Athletic	8 August 1970
Dunfermline Athletic	0–2	Morton	12 August 1970
Motherwell	0–2	Rangers	12 August 1970
Motherwell	3–0	Dunfermline Athletic	15 August 1970
Rangers	0–0	Morton	15 August 1970
Morton	3–2	Dunfermline Athletic	19 August 1970
Rangers	2–0	Motherwell	19 August 1970
Dunfermline Athletic	0–6	Rangers	22 August 1970
Motherwell	0–2	Morton	22 August 1970
Dunfermline Athletic	1–1	Motherwell	26 August 1970
Morton	0–2	Rangers	26 August 1970

=== Group 3 ===
Team	Pld	W	D	L	GF	GA	GD	Pts
Dundee	6	5	0	1	12	4	+8	10
Kilmarnock	6	4	1	1	8	4	+4	9
Ayr United	6	1	2	3	6	10	−4	4
St Mirren	6	0	1	5	4	12	−8	1

Home team	Score	Away team	Date
Dundee	1–0	St Mirren	8 August 1970
Kilmarnock	1–0	Ayr United	8 August 1970
Ayr United	1–2	Dundee	12 August 1970
St Mirren	1–3	Kilmarnock	12 August 1970
Ayr United	2–2	St Mirren	15 August 1970
Dundee	2–0	Kilmarnock	15 August 1970
Dundee	4–1	Ayr United	19 August 1970
Kilmarnock	2–0	St Mirren	19 August 1970
Ayr United	0–0	Kilmarnock	22 August 1970
St Mirren	0–2	Dundee	22 August 1970
Kilmarnock	2–1	Dundee	26 August 1970
St Mirren	1–2	Ayr United	26 August 1970

=== Group 4 ===
Team	Pld	W	D	L	GF	GA	GD	Pts
Hibernian	6	4	2	0	16	7	+9	10
Aberdeen	6	3	2	1	12	10	+2	8
Airdrieonians	6	2	1	3	10	15	−5	5
St Johnstone	6	0	1	5	3	9	−6	1

Home team	Score	Away team	Date
Airdrieonians	1–1	Aberdeen	8 August 1970
St Johnstone	1–3	Hibernian	8 August 1970
Aberdeen	2–1	St Johnstone	12 August 1970
Hibernian	3–2	Airdrieonians	12 August 1970
Aberdeen	1–1	Hibernian	15 August 1970
St Johnstone	0–1	Airdrieonians	15 August 1970
Airdrieonians	2–4	Hibernian	19 August 1970
St Johnstone	0–1	Aberdeen	19 August 1970
Aberdeen	7–3	Airdrieonians	22 August 1970
Hibernian	1–1	St Johnstone	22 August 1970
Airdrieonians	1–0	St Johnstone	26 August 1970
Hibernian	4–0	Aberdeen	26 August 1970

=== Group 5 ===
Team	Pld	W	D	L	GF	GA	GD	Pts
Partick Thistle	6	2	3	1	10	8	+2	7
East Fife	6	2	3	1	9	7	+2	7
Stirling Albion	6	1	4	1	9	9	0	6
Queen of the South	6	0	4	2	6	10	−4	4

Home team	Score	Away team	Date
Queen of the South	1–1	East Fife	8 August 1970
Stirling Albion	2–3	Partick Thistle	8 August 1970
East Fife	1–1	Stirling Albion	12 August 1970
Partick Thistle	4–1	Queen of the South	12 August 1970
East Fife	1–1	Partick Thistle	15 August 1970
Stirling Albion	2–2	Queen of the South	15 August 1970
Queen of the South	0–0	Partick Thistle	19 August 1970
Stirling Albion	2–1	East Fife	19 August 1970
East Fife	2–1	Queen of the South	22 August 1970
Partick Thistle	1–1	Stirling Albion	22 August 1970
Partick Thistle	1–3	East Fife	26 August 1970
Queen of the South	1–1	Stirling Albion	26 August 1970

=== Group 6 ===
Team	Pld	W	D	L	GF	GA	GD	Pts
Dumbarton	6	5	1	0	18	8	+10	11
Berwick Rangers	6	3	1	2	11	9	+2	7
Alloa Athletic	6	2	1	3	9	11	−2	5
Brechin City	6	0	1	5	7	17	−10	1

Home team	Score	Away team	Date
Alloa Athletic	1–3	Dumbarton	8 August 1970
Brechin City	2–3	Berwick Rangers	8 August 1970
Berwick Rangers	1–1	Alloa Athletic	12 August 1970
Dumbarton	2–2	Brechin City	12 August 1970
Berwick Rangers	0–2	Dumbarton	15 August 1970
Brechin City	1–3	Alloa Athletic	15 August 1970
Alloa Athletic	0–1	Berwick Rangers	19 August 1970
Brechin City	1–3	Dumbarton	19 August 1970
Berwick Rangers	4–1	Brechin City	22 August 1970
Dumbarton	5–2	Alloa Athletic	22 August 1970
Alloa Athletic	2–0	Brechin City	26 August 1970
Dumbarton	3–2	Berwick Rangers	26 August 1970

=== Group 7 ===
Team	Pld	W	D	L	GF	GA	GD	Pts
Cowdenbeath	6	4	1	1	15	6	+9	9
Montrose	6	4	0	2	11	9	+2	8
Raith Rovers	6	2	0	4	5	12	−7	4
East Stirlingshire	6	1	1	4	7	11	−4	3

Home team	Score	Away team	Date
Cowdenbeath	1–1	East Stirlingshire	8 August 1970
Raith Rovers	1–0	Montrose	8 August 1970
East Stirlingshire	2–0	Raith Rovers	12 August 1970
Montrose	3–2	Cowdenbeath	12 August 1970
Cowdenbeath	3–1	Raith Rovers	15 August 1970
East Stirlingshire	1–2	Montrose	15 August 1970
Cowdenbeath	3–0	Montrose	19 August 1970
Raith Rovers	2–1	East Stirlingshire	19 August 1970
East Stirlingshire	1–4	Cowdenbeath	22 August 1970
Montrose	4–1	Raith Rovers	22 August 1970
Montrose	2–1	East Stirlingshire	26 August 1970
Raith Rovers	0–2	Cowdenbeath	26 August 1970

=== Group 8 ===
Team	Pld	W	D	L	GF	GA	GD	Pts
Falkirk	6	5	1	0	18	3	+15	11
Clydebank	6	2	2	2	12	12	0	6
Arbroath	6	2	0	4	13	15	−2	4
Albion Rovers	6	1	1	4	8	21	−13	3

Home team	Score	Away team	Date
Clydebank	4–1	Arbroath	8 August 1970
Falkirk	5–0	Albion Rovers	8 August 1970
Albion Rovers	2–2	Clydebank	12 August 1970
Arbroath	1–4	Falkirk	12 August 1970
Albion Rovers	2–1	Arbroath	15 August 1970
Clydebank	0–3	Falkirk	15 August 1970
Clydebank	5–1	Albion Rovers	19 August 1970
Falkirk	2–1	Arbroath	19 August 1970
Albion Rovers	0–3	Falkirk	22 August 1970
Arbroath	4–0	Clydebank	22 August 1970
Arbroath	5–3	Albion Rovers	26 August 1970
Falkirk	1–1	Clydebank	26 August 1970

=== Group 9 ===
Team	Pld	W	D	L	GF	GA	GD	Pts
Stranraer	4	3	0	1	9	4	+5	6
Queen's Park	4	2	2	0	8	4	+4	6
Hamilton Academical	4	1	1	2	7	8	−1	3
Forfar Athletic	4	1	1	2	4	5	−1	3
Stenhousemuir	4	1	0	3	5	12	−7	2

Home team	Score	Away team	Date
Forfar Athletic	2–1	Stenhousemuir	8 August 1970
Hamilton Academical	2–3	Stranraer	8 August 1970
Queen's Park	1–1	Forfar Athletic	12 August 1970
Stenhousemuir	3–2	Hamilton Academical	12 August 1970
Forfar Athletic	1–2	Hamilton Academical	15 August 1970
Queen's Park	2–1	Stranraer	15 August 1970
Hamilton Academical	1–1	Queen's Park	19 August 1970
Stranraer	4–0	Stenhousemuir	19 August 1970
Stenhousemuir	1–4	Queen's Park	22 August 1970
Stranraer	1–0	Forfar Athletic	22 August 1970

== Supplementary round ==
=== First leg ===
Home team	Score	Away team	Date
Partick Thistle	2–1	Stranraer	31 August 1970

=== Second leg ===
Home team	Score	Away team	Date	Agg
Stranraer	2–2	Partick Thistle	2 September 1970	3–4

== Quarter-finals ==
=== First leg ===
Home team	Score	Away team	Date
Dundee	2–2	Celtic	9 September 1970
Falkirk	0–1	Cowdenbeath	9 September 1970
Hibernian	1–3	Rangers	9 September 1970
Partick Thistle	3–3	Dumbarton	9 September 1970

=== Second leg ===
Home team	Score	Away team	Date	Agg
Celtic	5–1	Dundee	23 September 1970	7–3
Cowdenbeath	0–0	Falkirk	23 September 1970	1–0
Dumbarton	3–2	Partick Thistle	23 September 1970	6–5
Rangers	3–1	Hibernian	23 September 1970	6–2

== Semi-finals ==
=== Ties ===
Home team	Score	Away team	Date
Dumbarton	0–0	Celtic	7 October 1970
Rangers	2–0	Cowdenbeath	14 October 1970

=== Replay ===
Home team	Score	Away team	Date
Celtic	4–3	Dumbarton	12 October 1970

== Final ==
24 October 1970

Rangers	1–0	Celtic
Johnstone

Hampden Park, Glasgow
Attendance: 106,263
