= Kenny Jenkins =

Scottish footballer (1945–2009)

Personal information
- Full name: Kenneth Jenkins
- Date of birth: 28 February 1945
- Place of birth: Glasgow
- Date of death: 13 November 2009 (aged 64)
- Place of death: Glasgow
- Position: Forward

Youth career
- Johnstone Burgh

Senior career*
Years	Team	Apps	(Gls)
1965–1969	Albion Rovers	99	(56)
1969–1974	Dumbarton	128	(13)
- * Club domestic league appearances and goals

Kenneth 'Kenny' Jenkins (28 February 1945 – 13 November 2009) was a Scottish footballer who played in attack and defence. Jenkins played for Johnstone Burgh, Albion Rovers, Dumbarton and APIA Leichhardt Tigers.
