= 1971–72 Scottish Division Two =

Scottish Second Division
- Season: 1971–72
- Champions: Dumbarton
- Promoted: Dumbarton; Arbroath

The 1971–72 Scottish Second Division was won by Dumbarton who, along with second placed Arbroath, were promoted to the First Division. Hamilton Academical finished bottom.

== Table ==
| Pos | Team | Pld | W | D | L | GF | GA | GD | Pts | Promotion or relegation |
|---|---|---|---|---|---|---|---|---|---|---|
| 1 | Dumbarton | 36 | 24 | 4 | 8 | 89 | 51 | +38 | 52 | Promotion to the 1972–73 First Division |
| 2 | Arbroath | 36 | 22 | 8 | 6 | 71 | 41 | +30 | 52 | Promotion to the 1972–73 First Division |
| 3 | Stirling Albion | 36 | 21 | 8 | 7 | 75 | 37 | +38 | 50 | |
| 4 | St Mirren | 36 | 24 | 2 | 10 | 84 | 47 | +37 | 50 | |
| 5 | Cowdenbeath | 36 | 19 | 10 | 7 | 69 | 28 | +41 | 48 | |
| 6 | Stranraer | 36 | 18 | 8 | 10 | 70 | 62 | +8 | 44 | |
| 7 | Queen of the South | 36 | 17 | 9 | 10 | 56 | 38 | +18 | 43 | |
| 8 | East Stirlingshire | 36 | 17 | 7 | 12 | 60 | 58 | +2 | 41 | |
| 9 | Clydebank | 36 | 14 | 11 | 11 | 60 | 52 | +8 | 39 | |
| 10 | Montrose | 36 | 15 | 6 | 15 | 73 | 54 | +19 | 36 | |
| 11 | Raith Rovers | 36 | 13 | 8 | 15 | 56 | 56 | 0 | 34 | |
| 12 | Queen's Park | 36 | 12 | 9 | 15 | 47 | 61 | −14 | 33 | |
| 13 | Berwick Rangers | 36 | 14 | 4 | 18 | 53 | 50 | +3 | 32 | |
| 14 | Stenhousemuir | 36 | 10 | 8 | 18 | 41 | 58 | −17 | 28 | |
| 15 | Brechin City | 36 | 8 | 7 | 21 | 41 | 79 | −38 | 23 | |
| 16 | Alloa Athletic | 36 | 9 | 4 | 23 | 41 | 75 | −34 | 22 | |
| 17 | Forfar Athletic | 36 | 6 | 9 | 21 | 32 | 84 | −52 | 21 | |
| 18 | Albion Rovers | 36 | 7 | 6 | 23 | 36 | 61 | −25 | 20 | |
| 19 | Hamilton Academical | 36 | 4 | 8 | 24 | 31 | 93 | −62 | 16 | |

Source: "1971-1972 Second Division - SPFL Archive". SPFL.
